= List of strongman competitions =

Strongman competitions include world and continental championships, international contests, national and regional championships, supertotal contests, and competitions for athletes under 105 kg.

== List ==
=== World & Continental championship contests ===
- World's Strongest Man
- Arnold Strongman Classic
- Rogue Invitational
- Strongest Man on Earth (Defunct)
- World's Ultimate Strongman (Defunct)
- IFSA World Championship (Defunct)
- Fortissimus (Defunct)
- Giants Live
- Strongman Champions League
- World Strength Games

==== Europe ====
- Europe's Strongest Man
- OSG European Championships

==== North America ====
- North America's Strongest Man

=== International contests ===
- Siberian Power Show
- Magnús Ver Magnússon Strongman Classic

=== National championship contests ===
==== European championship contests ====
- Austria's Strongest Man
- Austrian Summer Giants
- Austrian Winter Giants
- Belarus Strongest Man
- Belgium's Strongest Man
- Bulgaria Strongest Man
- Czechia's Strongest Man
- Cyprus Strongest Man
- Denmark's Strongest Man
- Denmark's Strongest Viking
- Estonia's Strongest Man
- Faroe Islands Strongest Man
- Finland's Strongest Man
- Finland's Nationals
- France's Strongest Man
- Germany's Strongest Man
- Strongest man of the Netherlands
- Hungary's Strongest Man
- Iceland's Strongest Man
- Iceland's Strongest Man (IFSA)
- Iceland's Strongest Viking
- Italy's Strongest Man
- Latvia's Strongest Man
- Lithuania's Strongest Man
- Norway's Strongest Man
- Norway's Strongest Viking
- Poland's Strongest Man
- Portugal's Strongest Man
- Romania's Strongest Man
- Russia's Strongest Man
- Slovenia's Strongest Man
- Spain's Strongest Man
- Sweden's Strongest Man
- Strongest Man in Iceland
- Ukraine's Strongest Man

===== UK and Ireland =====
- United Kingdom
  - Britain's Strongest Man
  - UK Strongest Man
  - UK Truck Pulling Championships
  - National Truck Pulling Championships
  - British Truck Pulling Championships
- Regional
  - England's Strongest Man
  - Scotland's Strongest Man
  - Wales Strongest Man
  - Celtic Carnage
  - All Ireland Strongest Man
  - Northern Ireland (Ulster) Strongest Man
  - Ulster's Strongest Man
  - Republic of Ireland's Strongest Man
  - Western Isles Strongest man
  - Highland games
  - Orkney\Shetland's Strongest Man
  - CNP Professional Strongman Premier League
  - Midland's Strongest Man
  - Corby Great Strength Eccleston
  - East Britain Strongest Man
  - North of England Strongest Man
  - Yorkshire's Strongest Man

==== Rest of the world national contests ====
- All Africa Strongman
- Australia's Strongest Man
- Brazil Strongest Man
- Canada's Strongest Man
- China Strongest Man
- Hawaii's Strongest Man
- Iran's Strongest Man
- New Zealand's Strongest Man
- Quebec Cup - Strongman series
- Quebec's Strongest Man
- South Africa's Strongest Man
- America's Strongest Man

=== Supertotal contests ===
- Static Monsters Worldwide
- King and Queen of Overhead

=== Under 105K contests ===
World Championships
- World's Strongest Man u105k (Official Strongman)
  - World's Strongest Nation U105

European Championships

- Europe's Strongest Man u105k (Official Strongman)

National Championships

- America's Strongest Man u105k
- Canada's Strongest Man u105k
- Germany's Strongest Man u105k
- Netherlands Strongest Man u105k
- Norway's Strongest Man u105k - Kristiansand Sowlift Open
- Portugal's Strongest Man u105k
- Sweden's Strongest Man u105k
- United Kingdom
  - UK's Strongest Man u105k
  - Britain's Strongest Man u105k
  - England's Strongest Man u105k
  - Scotland's Strongest Man u105k
  - Wales's Strongest Man u105k

== See also ==
- List of professional bodybuilding competitions
