= Strength athletics in Finland =

Strength athletics in Finland refers to the participation of Finnish competitors and holding national strongman competitions.

== History ==
Finland had enormous success on the international stage in the 1990s and early 2000s, having won 3 World's Strongest Man titles, and numerous major European and international competitions. In particular, Jouko Ahola was the 1997 World's Strongest Man & 1999 World's Strongest Man champion, Janne Virtanen won the 2000 World's Strongest Man, and Riku Kiri was a 3 time consecutive Europe's Strongest Man champion from 1995-1997. In recent years Finland has struggled in the major international scene, having not made the finals of WSM since 2002, and not having any major international victories.

== National competitions ==
=== Finland's Strongest Man ===
Finland's Strongest Man
Tournament information
- Location: Finland
- Established: 1987
- Format: Multi-event competition

Current champion
- (Finland) Jesse Pynnönen (2026)

Finland's Strongest Man is an annual Strongman competition held in Finland and featuring exclusively Finnish athletes, to determine who the strongest Finn of the year is. It was first held in 1987 and has produced 19 champions throughout its 34 consecutive years. It is one of the oldest strongman competitions in the world.

Mika Törrö holds the record for the most number of wins with six titles while Janne Virtanen and Jani Illikainen share four titles each. Ilkka Nummisto and Riku Kiri share three titles each as well. Jón Páll Sigmarsson, Bill Kazmaier and Hjalti Arnason were guests in the competition but their placings were not included in the final results.

==== Champions breakdown ====
Year	Champion	Runner-up	3rd place
1987	(Finland) Arto Lyytikäinen	(Finland) Markku Suonenvirta	(Finland) Jari Leino & Kari Pötrönen
1988	(Finland) Riku Kiri	(To be confirmed)	(To be confirmed)
1989	(Finland) Markku Suonenvirta	(Finland) Ilkka Nummisto	(To be confirmed)
1990	(Finland) Ilkka Nummisto	(Finland) Markku Suonenvirta	(To be confirmed)
1991	(Finland) Ilkka Nummisto	(Finland) Markku Suonenvirta	(To be confirmed)
1992	(Finland) Ilkka Nummisto	(Finland) Jukka Laine	(Finland) Marko Varalahti
1993	(Finland) Riku Kiri	(Finland) Marko Varalahti	(Finland) Jarmo Ruotsalainen
1994	(Finland) Riku Kiri	(Finland) Harri Simonen	(Finland) Jorma Ojanaho
1995	(Finland) Marko Varalahti	(Finland) Sami Heinonen	(Finland) Jukka Laine
1996	(Finland) Jorma Ojanaho	(Finland) Jouko Ahola	(Finland) Marko Varalahti
1997	(Finland) Jouko Ahola	(Finland) Sami Heinonen	(Finland) Jorma Ojanaho
1998	(Finland) Janne Virtanen	(Finland) Matti Uppa	(Finland) Jukka Laine
1999	(Finland) Janne Virtanen	(Finland) Sami Heinonen	(Finland) Juha-Matti Räsänen
2000	(Finland) Janne Virtanen	(Finland) Sami Heinonen	(Finland) Juha-Matti Räsänen
2001	(Finland) Janne Virtanen	(Finland) Juha-Matti Räsänen	(Finland) Pasi Paavisto
2002	(Finland) Juha-Matti Räsänen	(Finland) Sami Heinonen	(Finland) Harri Simonen
2003	(Finland) Juha-Matti Räsänen	(Finland) Esa Qvintus	(Finland) Tomi Lotta
2004	(Finland) Tomi Lotta	(Finland) Juha-Matti Räsänen	(Finland) Jani Illikainen
2005	(Finland) Jani Illikainen	(Finland) Matti Uppa	(Finland) Juha-Pakka Aitala
2006	(Finland) Jani Illikainen	(Finland) Juha-Matti Räsänen	(Finland) Esa Qvintus
2007	(Finland) Jani Illikainen	(Finland) Jani Kolehmainen	(Finland) Janne Hartikainen
2008	(Finland) Jani Illikainen	(To be confirmed)	(To be confirmed)
2009	(Finland) Juha Matti Jarvi	(To be confirmed)	(To be confirmed)
2010	(Finland) Pedro Karlsson	(To be confirmed)	(To be confirmed)
2011	(Finland) Jarno Jokinen	(Finland) Pedro Karlsson	(To be confirmed)
2014	(Finland) Arto Niemi-Nikkola	(Finland) Jarno Kirselä	(Finland) Juha Jokinen
2015	(Finland) Jarno Kirsela	(Sweden) Andreas Ståhlberg	(Finland) Juha Jokinen
2016	(Finland) Niko Vesterinen	(Sweden) Andreas Ståhlberg	(Finland) Jiri Grönman
2017	(Finland) Niko Vesterinen	(Finland) Jesse Matilainen	(Finland) Martti Harjapää
2018	(Finland) Mika Törrö	(Finland) Niko Vesterinen	(Finland) Jesse Matilainen
2019	(Finland) Mika Törrö	(Finland) Jiri Grönman	(Finland) Jesse Matilainen
2020	(Finland) Mika Törrö	(Finland) Jiri Grönman	(Finland) Jesse Pynnönen
2021	(Finland) Mika Törrö	(Finland) Henry Ollila	(Finland) Severi Allonen
2022	(Finland) Mika Törrö	(Finland) Jarkko Mehtälä	(Finland) Teemu Pohto
2023	(Finland) Jarkko Mehtälä	(Finland) Jesse Pynnönen	(Finland) Mika Törrö
2024	(Finland) Severi Allonen	(Finland) Jesse Pynnönen	(Finland) Mika Törrö
2025	(Finland) Mika Törrö	(Finland) Jesse Pynnönen	(Finland) Niko Nurmi
2026	(Finland) Jesse Pynnönen	(Finland) Niko Nurmi	(Finland) Tuomas Lindroos

===== Repeat champions =====
Champion	Times & years
(Finland) Mika Törrö	6 (2018, 2019, 2020, 2021, 2022, 2025)
(Finland) Janne Virtanen	4 (1998, 1999, 2000, 2001)
(Finland) Janni Illikainen	4 (2005, 2006, 2007, 2009)
(Finland) Riku Kiri	3 (1988, 1993, 1994)
(Finland) Ilkka Nummisto	3 (1990, 1991, 1992)
(Finland) Juha-Matti Räsänen	2 (2002, 2003)
(Finland) Niko Vesterinen	2 (2016, 2017)

== Regional Competitions ==
=== Nordic Strongman Championships ===
Nordic Strongman Championships consists of athletes from Iceland, Norway, Sweden, Finland and Denmark.

Year	Champion	Runner-Up	3rd Place
2005	(Norway) Svend Karlsen	(Sweden) Magnus Samuelsson	(Finland) Juha-Matti Räsänen
2012	(Sweden) Johannes Årsjö	(Norway) Lars Rorbakken	(Denmark) Mikkel Leicht
2013	(Sweden) Johannes Årsjö	(Norway) Ole Martin Hansen	(Finland) Juha-Matti Järvi

- In 2005, the competition was held under IFSA in Kristiansand, and in 2012 and 2013 in Harstad, Norway under Giants Live.
- From 2014 onwards, the competition was promoted to global level, re-titled as the World's Strongest Viking and was held consecutively for 8 years under Strongman Champions League.

== International Competitions ==
=== World's Strongest Viking ===
Finland hosts the summer edition of the World's Strongest Viking competition, with the participation of top athletes of the world.

Year	Champion	Runner-up	3rd place
2023	(United Kingdom) Kane Francis	(Estonia) Ervin Toots	(Iceland) Sigfús Fossdal
2025	(Poland) Adam Roszkowski	(Netherlands) Kevin Hazeleger	(Sweden) Jesper Hansson
2026	(Poland) Adam Roszkowski	(Hungary) Peter Juhasz	(Sweden) Jesper Hansson

=== Giants Live ===
Finland was also the venue for a couple of Giants Live grand prix competitions, named Giants Live Finland.

Year	Champion	Runner-Up	3rd Place
2011	(Austria) Martin Wildauer	(Lithuania) Vidas Blekaitis	(Estonia) Rauno Heinla
2012	(United Kingdom) Laurence Shahlaei	(Sweden) Johannes Årsjö	(Estonia) Lauri Nämi
