= Strength athletics in Norway =

Strength athletics in Norway refers to the participation of Norwegian competitors and holding national strongman competitions.

== History ==
The sport's roots have a long history going back many centuries before modern strongman competitions in the 1970s. However, Norway did not come onto the international scene in modern times until Torkel Ravndal broke the deadlift world record. Norway has had mixed success on the international stage, with Svend Karlsen winning the 2001 World's Strongest Man title, Norway's only WSM title. In recent years, Norway has had several top international competitors in WSM, including Odd Haugen, Arild Haugen, Richard Skog, Espen Aune, Ole Martin Hansen and Bjørn Andre Solvang.

== National Competitions ==
=== Norway's Strongest Man ===
Norway's Strongest Man
Tournament information
- Location: Norway
- Month played: September
- Established: 1998
- Format: Multi-event competition

Current champion
- (Norway) Henrik Hildeskor (2026)

Norway's Strongest Man (Norwegian: Norges Sterkeste Mann) is an annual strongman competition and the main national title of Norway. The event was established in 1998 and has produced fourteen champions throughout the years. Kurt Kvikkstad won in 1998 & 1999, with Roy Holte winning the next 3 years. Then emerged Svend Karlsen, Norway's greatest strength athlete who took the 2003, 2005, and 2006 titles. In 2004 Mattis Bjorheim won the title. Arild Haugen won in 2007 & 2008 and Richard Skog won in 2009 & 2010. Espen Aune won in 2011 and then emerged Ole Martin Hansen who won the title a record four times from 2012 to 2015. Jørgen Skaug Aukland won in 2016 followed by Bjørn Andre Solvang in 2017. Then emerged Ole Martin Kristiansen who won the title three times from 2018 to 2020. Jonas Bathen won in 2021, Henrik Hildeskor in 2022, 2023, 2025 & 2026 and Håkon Heitmann Kollerød in 2024.

==== Champions breakdown ====
Year	Champion	Runner-up	3rd place
1998	(Norway) Kurt Kvikkstad	(Norway) Thomas Johansen	(Norway) Roy Holte
1999	(Norway) Kurt Kvikkstad	(Norway) Marius Bjerke	(Norway) Roy Holte
2000	(Norway) Roy Holte	(Norway) Odd Haugen	(Norway) Olaf Dahl
2001	(Norway) Roy Holte	(Norway) Kurk Kvikkstad	(Norway) Frank Nagy
2002	(Norway) Roy Holte	(Norway) Olaf Dahl	(Norway) Frank Nagy
2003	(Norway) Svend Karlsen	(Norway) Odd Haugen	(Norway) Reider Kvåle
2004	(Norway) Reider Kvåle	(Norway) Espen Aune	(Norway) Olaf Dahl
2005	(Norway) Svend Karlsen	(Norway) Reider Kvåle	(Norway) Olaf Dahl
2006	(Norway) Svend Karlsen	(Norway) Arild Haugen	(Norway) Reider Kvåle
2007	(Norway) Arild Haugen	(Norway) Espen Aune	(Norway) Odd Haugen
2008	(Norway) Arild Haugen	(Norway) Richard Skog	(Norway) Odd Haugen
2009	(Norway) Richard Skog	(Norway) Arild Haugen	(Norway) Lars Rørbakken
2010	(Norway) Richard Skog	(Norway) Espen Aune	(Norway) Bjørn Andre Solvang
2011	(Norway) Espen Aune	(Norway) Lars Rørbakken	(Norway) Bjørn Andre Solvang
2012	(Norway) Ole Martin Hansen	(Norway) Lars Rørbakken	(Norway) Espen Aune
2013	(Norway) Ole Martin Hansen	(Norway) Bjørn Andre Solvang	(Norway) Øyvind Rein
2014	(Norway) Ole Martin Hansen	(Norway) Espen Aune	(Norway) Bjørn Andre Solvang
2015	(Norway) Ole Martin Hansen	(Norway) Bjørn Andre Solvang	(Norway) Espen Aune
2016	(Norway) Jørgen Skaug Aukland	(Norway) Ole Martin Hansen	(Norway) Ole Martin Kristiansen
2017	(Norway) Bjørn Andre Solvang	(Norway) Ole Martin Kristiansen	(Norway) Jon Olav Granli
2018	(Norway) Ole Martin Kristiansen	(Norway) Nils Kjetil Sande	(Norway) Jonas Bathen
2019	(Norway) Ole Martin Kristiansen	(Norway) Bjørn Andre Solvang	(Norway) Jørn Erik Bolstad
2020	(Norway) Ole Martin Kristiansen	(Norway) Henrik Hildeskor	(Norway) Stefan Sekej
2021	(Norway) Jonas Bathen	(Norway) Stefan Sekej	(Norway) Øyvind Gustavsen
2022	(Norway) Henrik Hildeskor	(Norway) Morten Linge	(Norway) Dag Rune Stangeland
2023	(Norway) Henrik Hildeskor	(Norway) Tommy Kåsin	(Norway) Morten Linge
2024	(Norway) Håkon Heitmann Kollerød	(Norway) Henrik Hildeskor	(Norway) Andre Vrålid
2025	(Norway) Henrik Hildeskor	(Norway) Håkon Heitmann Kollerød	(Norway) Dag Rune Stangeland
2026	(Norway) Henrik Hildeskor	(Norway) Håkon Heitmann Kollerød	(United Kingdom) Max Rogers

==== Repeat champions ====
Champion	Times & years
(Norway) Ole Martin Hansen	4 (2012, 2013, 2014, 2015)
(Norway) Henrik Hildeskor	4 (2022, 2023, 2025, 2026)
(Norway) Roy Holte	3 (2000, 2001, 2002)
(Norway) Svend Karlsen	3 (2003, 2005, 2006)
(Norway) Ole Martin Kristiansen	3 (2018, 2019, 2020)
(Norway) Arild Haugen	2 (2002, 2003)
(Norway) Richard Skog	2 (2009, 2010)

== Regional Competitions ==
=== Nordic Strongman Championships ===
Nordic Strongman Championships consists of athletes from Iceland, Norway, Sweden, Finland and Denmark.

Year	Champion	Runner-Up	3rd Place
2005	(Norway) Svend Karlsen	(Sweden) Magnus Samuelsson	(Finland) Juha-Matti Räsänen
2012	(Sweden) Johannes Årsjö	(Norway) Lars Rorbakken	(Denmark) Mikkel Leicht
2013	(Sweden) Johannes Årsjö	(Norway) Ole Martin Hansen	(Finland) Juha-Matti Järvi

- In 2005, the competition was held under IFSA in Kristiansand, and in 2012 and 2013 in Harstad, Norway under Giants Live.
- From 2014 onwards, the competition was promoted to global level, re-titled as the World's Strongest Viking and was held consecutively for 8 years under Strongman Champions League.

== International Competitions ==
=== World's Strongest Viking ===
Norway hosted the winter edition of the World's Strongest Viking competition, with the participation of top athletes of the world.

Year	Champion	Runner-up	3rd place
2014	(Iceland) Hafþór Júlíus Björnsson	(Sweden) David Nyström	(United Kingdom) Terry Hollands
2015	(Iceland) Hafþór Júlíus Björnsson	(Poland) Krzysztof Radzikowski	(Canada) Jean-François Caron
2016	(Canada) Jean-François Caron	(Slovenia) Matjaz Belsak	(Poland) Krzysztof Radzikowski
2017	(Canada) Jean-François Caron	(Poland) Krzysztof Radzikowski	(United States) Luke Herrick
2018	(Poland) Krzysztof Radzikowski	(Germany) Dennis Kohlruss	(United States) Luke Herrick
2019	(Poland) Krzysztof Radzikowski	(Norway) Ole Martin Kristiansen	(Finland) Mika Törrö
2020	(Republic of Ireland) Sean O'Hagan	(Latvia) Aivars Šmaukstelis	(Finland) Mika Törrö
2021	(Latvia) Dainis Zageris	(Netherlands) Kelvin de Ruiter	(Norway) Henrik Hildeskor
2023	(Sweden) Johan Espenkrona	(United States) Eric Dawson	(Norway) Øyvind Gustavsen

=== Giants Live ===
Norway was also the venue for a Giants Live Viking Power Challenge competition.

Year	Champion	Runner-Up	3rd Place
2009	(United States) Travis Ortmayer	(Norway) Richard Skog	(Russia) Mikhail Koklyaev
