= Igor Werner =

Personal information
- Born: Igor Werner; March 22, 1974 (age 52) Germany
- Occupation: Strongman
- Height: 1.85 m (6 ft 1 in)
Medal record
Strongman
Representing Germany
World's Strongest Man
Qualified	2008 World's Strongest Man
Germany's Strongest Man
2nd	2006
1st	2007
2nd	2008
1st	2010

Igor Werner (born 22 March 1974) is a German strongman competitor and entrant to the World's Strongest Man competition.

== Biography ==
Werner started with training in 1997. The first tournament he won as a strongman was the Newcomer Cup in Ditzingen 2001. In 2007 he became Germany's Strongest Man for the first time after placing second behind Heinz Ollesch the previous year. In 2008 he finished second behind Florian Trimpl in Germany's Strongest Man. the same year he was invited for the World's Strongest Man where he finished last in his qualifying heat and did not qualify for the final. In 2010 he became Germany's Strongest Man for the second time.

== Strongman competition record ==
- 2006
  - 2. - Germany's Strongest Man
- 2007
  - 1. - Germany's Strongest Man
- 2008
  - 2. - Germany's Strongest Man
  - 11. Strongman Champions League Serbia
  - Q. - 2008 World's Strongest Man
- 2010
  - 1. - Germany's Strongest Man

Preceded by Heinz Ollesch; Tobias Ide	Germany's Strongest Man; 2007; 2010	Succeeded by Florian Trimpl incumbent
