= 2008 World's Strongest Man =

Strongman competition in 2008

Competition information
- Dates: 6–13 September 2008
- Venue: Haddad Riverfront Park / Coonskin Park / McLaughlin Air National Guard Base / Power Park
- Location: Charleston, West Virginia
- Country: United States
- Athletes participating: 30
- Nations participating: 12

Champion(s)
- (Poland) Mariusz Pudzianowski

The 2008 World's Strongest Man was the 31st edition of World's Strongest Man and was won by Mariusz Pudzianowski from Poland. It was his fifth and record breaking title. Derek Poundstone from the United States finished second, and Dave Ostlund also from the United States finished third after finishing sixth the previous year. The contest was held at Charleston, West Virginia.

== Heat results ==
=== Heat 1 ===
#	Name	Nationality	Pts
1	Derek Poundstone	United States	29
2	Jason Bergmann	United States	27.5
3	Mark Felix	England	26
4	Stefán Sölvi Pétursson	Iceland	19
5	Jarek Dymek	Poland	18.5
6	Igor Werner	Germany	6

=== Heat 2 ===
#	Name	Nationality	Pts
1	Phil Pfister	United States	27.5
2	Sebastian Wenta	Poland	25
3	Johannes Årsjö	Sweden	22.5
4	Richard Skog	Norway	22.5
5	Oli Thompson	England	19.5
6	Tobias Ide	Germany	8

=== Heat 3 ===
#	Name	Nationality	Pts
1	Tarmo Mitt	Estonia	28.5
2	Terry Hollands	England	26.5
3	Kevin Nee	United States	23.5
4	Elbrus Nigmatullin	Russia	18.5
5	Janne Virtanen	Finland	18
6	Jean-François Caron	Canada	11

=== Heat 4 ===
#	Name	Nationality	Pts
1	Mariusz Pudzianowski	Poland	29
2	Arild Haugen	Norway	25
3	Brian Shaw	United States	21
4	Laurence Shahlaei	England	20
5	Louis-Philippe Jean	Canada	19.5
6	Brian Siders	United States	11.5

=== Heat 5 ===
#	Name	Nationality	Pts
1	Travis Ortmayer	United States	31.5
2	Dave Ostlund	United States	28
3	Jimmy Marku	England	23.5
4	Magnus Samuelsson	Sweden	19.5
5	Raivis Vidzis	Latvia	14.5
6	Florian Trimpl	Germany	9

== Final results ==
#	Name	Nationality	Pts
1	Mariusz Pudzianowski	Poland	58.5
2	Derek Poundstone	United States	53.5
3	Dave Ostlund	United States	49.5
4	Phil Pfister	United States	44.5
5	Travis Ortmayer	United States	39.5
6	Sebastian Wenta	Poland	38
7	Tarmo Mitt	Estonia	30.5
8	Arild Haugen	Norway	26
9	Jason Bergmann	United States	25
10	Terry Hollands	England	19

Preceded by 2007 World's Strongest Man	2008 World's Strongest Man	Succeeded by 2009 World's Strongest Man
