= WSG =

WSG or wsg may refer to:

- World Services Group, a global multidisciplinary professional services network
- Washington State Guard, a state defense force of the U.S. state of Washington.
- WSG, the IATA code for Washington County Airport, Pennsylvania, United States
- WSG, the ICAO code for Wasaya Airways, Ontario, Canada
- wsg, the ISO 639-3 code for Adilabad Gondi language, Gondwana, India
- Westside Gunn, American rapper and fashion designer (born 1982)
- World Strength Games international strongman competition and organization
- World Skate Games international roller sport competition
