= Tobias Ide =

German strongman

Personal information
- Born: Tobias Ide; 1980 (age 45–46) Germany
- Occupation: Strongman
- Height: 1.83 m (6 ft 0 in)
Medal record
Strongman
Representing Germany
World's Strongest Man
Qualified	2008 World's Strongest Man
Germany's Strongest Man
1st	2008
2nd	2009

Tobias Ide (born 1980) is a German strongman competitor and entrant to the World's Strongest Man competition.

== Biography ==
Ide started with training in 1995. In 2006 he competed for the first time in the final of Germany's Strongest Man where he placed seventh. A year later he would finish in fourth place. In 2008 he became the strongest man of Germany. The same year he was invited for the World's Strongest Man. He finished last in his qualifying heat and did not qualify for the final. In 2009 he finished second behind Florian Trimpl in Germany's Strongest Man.

== Strongman competition record ==
- 2006
  - 7. - Germany's Strongest Man
- 2007
  - 4. - Germany's Strongest Man
- 2008
  - 1. - Germany's Strongest Man
  - Q. - 2008 World's Strongest Man
- 2009
  - 2. - Germany's Strongest Man

Preceded by Igor Werner	Germany's Strongest Man; 2008	Succeeded by Florian Trimpl
