= Derek Boyer =

Fijian-Australian powerlifter, former strongman and actor

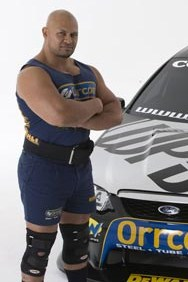
- Born: 14 June 1969 (age 57); Lautoka, Viti Levu, Fiji
- Occupations: Strongman, powerlifting, actor
- Height: 193 cm (6 ft 4 in)
- Title: Australia's Strongest Man
- Website: www.derekboyer.com

Competition record

Strongman

Representing Fiji

World's Strongest Man
| Qualified | 1996 World's Strongest Man |
| 9th | 1997 World's Strongest Man |
| Qualified | 1998 World's Strongest Man |
| Qualified | 2000 World's Strongest Man |
| Qualified | 2001 World's Strongest Man |
| Qualified | 2002 World's Strongest Man |
| Qualified | 2007 World's Strongest Man |
| Qualified | 2011 World's Strongest Man |

Fortissimus
| 10th | 2009 |

Australia's Strongest Man
| 1st | 2000 |
| 1st | 2001 |
| 1st | 2002 |
| 1st | 2003 |
| 1st | 2004 |
| 1st | 2005 |
| 1st | 2006 |
| 1st | 2007 |
| 1st | 2008 |
| 1st | 2009 |
| 1st | 2010 |
| 1st | 2011 |

Fit X Strongman Championships
| 1st | 2011 |

Powerlifting

Representing Fiji

WDFPF Raw World Powerlifting Championships
| 1st | 2003 | 145kg |

WDFPF World Powerlifting Championships
| 2nd | 1993 | 145kg |

Derek Boyer (born 14 June 1969) is a Fijian-Australian world champion powerlifter, former professional strongman competitor and actor.

== Strongman and powerlifting ==
Boyer has competed seven times in the World's Strongest Man contest, reaching the finals in 1997. He is the reigning 12 time Australia's Strongest Man, winning from 2000–2011. Boyer goes by the nickname "The Island Warrior". He has won numerous powerlifting titles in Australia.

Boyer currently holds the Guinness World Record for heaviest truck pulled, after he pulled a Kenworth K104 truck weighing 51,840 kg (114,287 lb; 51.84 metric tons) over a level 100 ft (30.48 m) course in Brisbane, Queensland, Australia, on 6 March 2005. He captured his 11th straight Australia's Strongest Man title on 5 June 2010.

=== Personal records ===
- Seefeld whitestone carry – 160 kg (353 lb) for 90.73 metres (297 ft 8 in) (1999 AFSA Austria Full Strength Challenge) (World Record)
- Replica Húsafell Stone carry (for speed) – 160 kg (353 lb) (86% of the original) for 35 metres in 18.40 seconds (1998 World Strongman Challenge) (World Record)

== Acting and television ==
Boyer has portrayed Bayman in DOA: Dead or Alive and promoted the steel products company Orcon, as Orcon's "Man of Steel", featuring Orcon's trackside promotional efforts at V8 Supercars events where Orcon has been a sponsor of race teams, Larkham Motor Sport, WPS Racing and Ford Performance Racing. He took on the role of 'Thunder' in the revived version of the Australian television sports entertainment series Australian Gladiators in 2008. He specialized in strength events like Duel, Whiplash and Sumo Ball, where he used his weight advantage.

Boyer appeared on Channel Nine's The Footy Show (AFL) on 19 August 2010 and, with Australian rules footballer Shane Crawford, attempted the world record for the most bench presses (weight had to be over 105 kg) in a minute. With no practice at all, he achieved 116, with the record standing at 121. In a later attempt on the record on 23 September on The Footy Show, again with Crawford, Boyer managed to break the record by completing 126 bench presses despite Crawford weighing about 9 kilograms more than the minimum requirement and raising $10,000 for charity in the process. As of July 2023, Boyer still holds this record.

Boyer was featured on the SBS program Housos as Bubbles, a prisoner who takes a shine to the "white meat" of Dazza Jones, and reprised his role in season 7 of cult Australian TV show Pizza in 2021. Boyer appeared on a 2012 episode of Big Brother Australia and in 2014, he was featured on 7mate's Bogan Hunters as a celebrity judge.

== Retirement and return to competition ==
On 14 September 2010, Boyer temporarily retired from strongman competition in a letter sent to Federation of Australian Strength Competitors (FASC) president Bill Lyndon. He stated that he will be focusing on powerlifting and sumo, and he won the Heavyweight category in the 2010 Australian Sumo Championships. However, he came out of retirement just six months later.

| Preceded by Grant Edwards | Australia's Strongest Man; 2000-2011 | Succeeded by Mike Vrljic |
