= Janne Virtanen =

Finnish former strongman (born 1969)

Personal information
- Born: 16 November 1969 (age 56) Espoo, Finland
- Occupation(s): Carpenter, Strongman
- Height: 196 cm (6 ft 5 in)
Medal record
Strongman
Representing Finland
World's Strongest Man
Qualified	1998 World's Strongest Man
2nd	1999 World's Strongest Man
1st	2000 World's Strongest Man
3rd	2001 World's Strongest Man
Qualified	2002 World's Strongest Man
5th	2005 World's Strongest Man
Qualified	2006 World's Strongest Man
Qualified	2007 World's Strongest Man
Qualified	2008 World's Strongest Man
World Muscle Power Championships
3rd	2002
World Strongman Challenge
1st	2000
World's Strongest Team
1st	1999 with Jouko Ahola
1st	2000 with Pasi Paavisto
1st	2001 with Juha Räsänen
1st	2002 with Juha Räsänen
Europe's Strongest Man
2nd	2001
4th	2002
2nd	2005
Finland's Strongest Man
1st	1998
1st	1999
1st	2000
1st	2001
Strongman Super Series
3rd	2002 Scotland Grand Prix
3rd	2005 Muscle Beach
2nd	2005 Sweden Grand Prix
World Strongman Cup Federation
2nd	2006 Moscow
1st	2007 Moscow
World Strongman Federation
2nd	2008 Globe's Strongest Man
1st	2008 World Team Championships
3rd	2008 Belarus
Beauty and the Beast
1st	2000
Helsinki Grand Prix
1st	2000
Vantaa Grand Prix
1st	2002
1st	2003
Polish Winter Cup
1st	2002
Turkey Grand Prix
1st	2002

Janne Virtanen (born 16 November 1969) is a Finnish former strongman who won the World's Strongest Man championship in 2000. He was runner-up in 1999 and finished third in 2001. His other championships include four-time Finland's Strongest Man (1998, 1999, 2000, 2001), Helsinki Grand Prix (2000), and the Turkey Grand Prix in 2002 in Istanbul. He also won second place in Europe's Strongest Man twice, third place in World Muscle Power Classic and won World's Strongest Team four times with Jouko Ahola, Pasi Paavisto and Juha-Matti Räsänen.

Following his second consecutive failure to reach the final of the World's Strongest Man in 2007, he announced his retirement but entered into the third qualifying heat of the competition in 2008 as his last appearance.

He currently works as a heavy duty carpenter in Finland.

== Personal Records ==
- Deadlift (raw with straps) – 340 kg (750 lb) (2001 World's Strongest Man, group 4) and 365 kg (805 lb) (during training)
- Log press – 155 kg (342 lb) (2002 IFSA Turkey Grand Prix)
- Axle press – 161 kg (355 lb) (2009 Strongman Super Series Romania Grand Prix)
- Keg Toss – 20 kg (44 lb) over 5.18 metres (17 ft 0 in) (2000 Beauty and the Beast)
- Celtic cross carry – 200 kg (441 lb) for 64.23 metres (210 ft 9 in) (2000 IFSA Ireland Grand Prix) (World Record)

== Completed contests ==
- 1999 World's Strongest Man - Valletta, Malta - 2nd place
- 2000 World's Strongest Man - Sun City, South Africa - 1st place
- 2001 World's Strongest Man - Victoria Falls, Zambia - 3rd place
