= Martin Muhr =

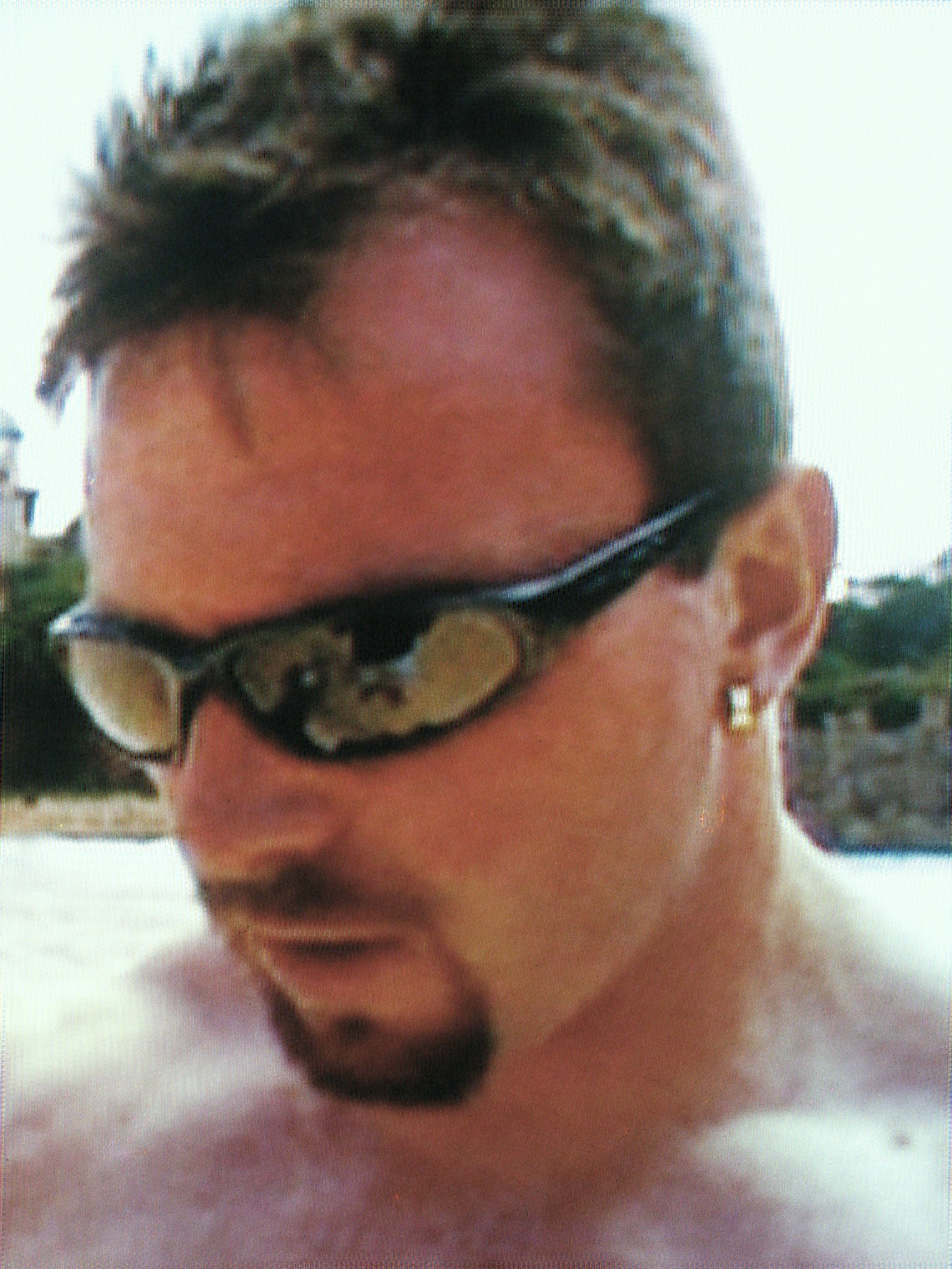

Personal information
- Born: June 17, 1971 (age 55) Bad Kötzting, Bavaria, Germany
- Occupation: Strongman
- Height: 1.88 m (6 ft 2 in)
Medal record
Strongman
Representing Germany
Qualified	1998 World's Strongest Man
6th	2000 World's Strongest Man
5th	2001 World's Strongest Man
Germany's Strongest Man
2nd	2001

Martin Muhr (born June 17, 1971) is a strongman from Germany. He participated in the World's Strongest Man finals of 2000 and 2001.

== Biography ==
Muhr was born in Bad Kötzting, Bavaria. In 1998 he was invited to the World's Strongest Man for the first time but did not make it past the qualifying heats. At the 2000 World's Strongest Man he finished second in his qualifying group which placed him in the final where he would finish sixth. A year later he was invited again and made it to the final once again and finished fifth. His best result at the World's Strongest Man. In 2001 he also placed second in Germany's Strongest Man.

== Honours ==
- 6th place World's Strongest Man (2000)
- 5th place World's Strongest Man (2001)

== Personal records ==
- Natural stone lift to platform – 6 Rocks ranging from 120–170 kg (265–375 lb) in 26.10 seconds (1997 IFSA Grand Prix) (World Record)
