= 2001 World's Strongest Man =

Strongman competition in 2001

Competition information
- Dates: 5-15 October 2001
- Location: Victoria Falls
- Country: Zambia
- Athletes participating: 30
- Nations participating: 17

Champion(s)
- (Norway) Svend Karlsen

The 2001 World's Strongest Man was the 24th edition of World's Strongest Man and was won by Svend Karlsen from Norway. It was his first title after finishing second the previous year. 1998 winner Magnus Samuelsson from Sweden finished second after finishing third the previous year, and 2000 winner Janne Virtanen from Finland finished third. The contest was held at Victoria Falls, Zambia.

== Qualifying heats ==
=== Heat 1 ===
- Events: Carry & Drag (Duck Walk & Drag Chain & Anchor), Arm Over Arm Train Pull, Africa Stone, Max Deadlift, Stone Circle (Connan Circle), Atlas Stones

#	Name	Nationality	Pts
1	Juha-Matti Räsänen	Finland	26
2	Wout Zijlstra	Netherlands	25.5
3	Rob Dixon	United Kingdom	24
4	Karl Gillingham	United States	21.5
5	Derek Boyer	Australia	20
6	Israel Garrido	Spain	9

Magnus Ver Magnusson of Iceland was originally intended to be within this Heat but had to withdraw making room for the reserve Israel Garrido.

=== Heat 2 ===
- Events: Carry & Drag (Duck Walk & Drag Chain & Anchor), Fingal's Fingers, Arm Over Arm Train Pull, Hercules Hold, Max Deadlift, Atlas Stones

#	Name	Nationality	Pts
1	Svend Karlsen	Norway	27.5
2	Hugo Girard	Canada	27
3	Mark Philippi	United States	22.5
4	Torbjörn Samuelsson	Sweden	21
5	Marc Iliffe	United Kingdom	14.5
6	Regin Vagadal	Faroe Islands	13.5

=== Heat 3 ===
- Events: Carry & Flip (Farmer's Walk & Tyre Flip), Arm Over Arm Train Pull, Africa Stone, Max Deadlift, Stone Circle (Connan Circle), Atlas Stones

#	Name	Nationality	Pts
1	Magnus Samuelsson	Sweden	28
2	Martin Muhr	Germany	26
3	Travis Lyndon	Canada	25
4	Raimonds Bergmanis	Latvia	17.5
5	Johnny Perry	United States	16.5
6	Glenn Ross	United Kingdom	13

=== Heat 4 ===
- Events: Carry & Drag (Duck Walk & Drag Chain & Anchor), Arm Over Arm Train Pull, Africa Stone, Max Deadlift, Stone Circle (Connan Circle), Atlas Stones

#	Name	Nationality	Pts
1	Janne Virtanen	Finland	31
2	Andrew Raynes	United Kingdom	21
3	Heinz Ollesch	Germany	20
4	Ralf Ber	Austria	20
5	Brian Schoonveld	United States	17
6	Levi Vaoga	New Zealand	17

Bill Lyndon of Australia was originally intended to be within this Heat but had to withdraw making room for the Levi Vaoga who was not down as an official reserve.

=== Heat 5 ===
- Events: Carry & Flip (Farmer's Walk & Tyre Flip), Fingal's Fingers, Arm Over Arm Train Pull, Hercules Hold, Max Deadlift, Atlas Stones

#	Name	Nationality	Pts
1	Phil Pfister	United States	31
2	Jarek Dymek	Poland	30
3	Odd Haugen	Norway	21
4	Adrian Rollinson	United Kingdom	18.5
5	Johan van Heerden	South Africa	16.5
6	Flemming Rasmussen	Denmark	7 (injury)

=== Reserves ===
- Israel Garrido Spain - used (Heat 1)
- Brian Bell United Kingdom
- Chad Coy United States

== Final results ==
#	Name	Nationality	Pts
1	Svend Karlsen	Norway	53.5
2	Magnus Samuelsson	Sweden	51.5
3	Janne Virtanen	Finland	50
4	Phil Pfister	United States	46
5	Martin Muhr	Germany	40
6	Hugo Girard	Canada	38.5
7	Jarek Dymek	Poland	30
8	Wout Zijlstra	Netherlands	28.5
9	Juha-Matti Räsänen	Finland	25.5
10	Andrew Raynes	United Kingdom	18.5

Preceded by 2000 World's Strongest Man	2001 World's Strongest Man	Succeeded by 2002 World's Strongest Man
