= Tomi Lotta =

Finnish strongman competitor (born 1976)

Personal information
- Born: January 1, 1976 (age 50) Finland
- Occupation: Strongman
- Height: 191 cm (6 ft 3 in)
Medal record
Strongman
Representing Finland
World's Strongest Man
Qualified	2004 World's Strongest Man
Strongman Champions League
2nd	Strongman Champions League 2011: Canary Islands
3rd	Strongman Champions League 2011: Slovakia
IFSA Strongman World Championships
Qualified	2005
Qualified	2006
IFSA Strongman European Championships
2nd	2005
IFSA
1st	2005 Holland Grand Prix
1st	2005 Dubai Grand Prix
IFSA World Team Championships
4th	2005 Team Scandinavia
Europe's Strongest Man (IFSA)
2nd	2005
Finland's Strongest Man
3rd	2003
1st	2004

Tomi Lotta (born 1 January 1976) is a Finnish strongman competitor.

== Career ==
Lotta has competed in both the World's Strongest Man and IFSA Strongman World Championships, but failed to make the finals in both events. His career best win is the 2004 Finland's Strongest Man title. He is known by his nickname "the Finnish Beach Boy".

He officially broke the Guinness world record for the forward hold event while competing in Rome in 2010 with a performance of 20 kg (44 lb) for 76.73 seconds, and to this day hold the world record for the 300 kg (661 lb) Conan's wheel (Basque circle).

== Personal Records ==
- Squat – 350 kg (772 lb)
- Bench Press – 230 kg (507 lb)
- Deadlift – 340 kg (750 lb)
- Conan's wheel (Basque circle) – 300 kg (661 lb) 1,460° rotation (2004 IFSA Holland Grand Prix) (World Record)
- IFSA shield carry – 183.5 kg (405 lb) for 96.10 metres (315 ft 3 in) (2006 IFSA Strongman World Championships, group 1) (World Record)
