= Johnny Perry =

American professional strongman and wrestler (1972-2002)

Personal information
- Born: October 24, 1972 North Carolina, U.S.
- Died: November 21, 2002 (aged 30) North Carolina, U.S.
- Years active: 2000-2002 (his death)
- Height: 6 ft 6 in (1.98 m)
- Weight: 170–180 kg (375–397 lb)
Medal record
Strongman
Representing United States
World's Strongest Man
Qualified	2000 World's Strongest Man
Qualified	2001 World's Strongest Man
4th	2002 World's Strongest Man
Viking Challenge
1st	2002 Viking Challenge
America's Strongest Man
4th	2000
3rd	2001
2nd	2002

Johnny Perry (October 24, 1972 – November 21, 2002) was an American professional strongman and wrestler from Zebulon, North Carolina.

Perry finished fourth in the 2002 World's Strongest Man competition. He also secured fourth, third and second place respectively at 2000, 2001 and 2002 America's Strongest Man competitions.

== Personal Records ==
- Deadlift – 350 kg (772 lb) (2001 World's Strongest Man - Group 3)
- Keg toss – 15 kg (33 lb) over 6.71 metres (22 ft 0 in) (2002 Viking Challenge) (former world record)

== Death ==
A few months after 2002 World's Strongest Man, Perry died abruptly on November 21, 2002, from heart failure due to its excess size caused by steroid use. He was ranked fourth in the world by the International Federation of Strength Athletes at the time of his death.
