= Australia's Strongest Man =

National strongman contest

Australia's Strongest Man is an annual strongman contest consisting of exclusively Australian strength athletes. The event was established in 1993. The first inaugural winner was Bill Lyndon, who preceded a number of different Australian strength athletes until the current date.

== Champions breakdown ==
Year	Champion	Runner-up	3rd place
1993	(Australia) Bill Lyndon	(To be confirmed)	(To be confirmed)
1994	(Australia) Bill Lyndon	(To be confirmed)	(To be confirmed)
1995	(Australia) Nathan Jones	(To be confirmed)	(To be confirmed)
1996	(Australia) Bill Lyndon	(To be confirmed)	(To be confirmed)
1997	(Australia) Grant Edwards	(To be confirmed)	(To be confirmed)
1998	(Australia) Bill Lyndon	(To be confirmed)	(To be confirmed)
1999	(Australia) Bill Lyndon	(To be confirmed)	(To be confirmed)
2000	(Australia) Derek Boyer	(To be confirmed)	(To be confirmed)
2001	(Australia) Derek Boyer	(To be confirmed)	(To be confirmed)
2002	(Australia) Derek Boyer	(To be confirmed)	(To be confirmed)
2003	(Australia) Derek Boyer	(To be confirmed)	(To be confirmed)
2004	(Australia) Derek Boyer	(To be confirmed)	(To be confirmed)
2005	(Australia) Derek Boyer	(To be confirmed)	(To be confirmed)
2006	(Australia) Derek Boyer	(To be confirmed)	(To be confirmed)
2007	(Australia) Derek Boyer	Eben le Roux	(To be confirmed)
2008	(Australia) Derek Boyer	(Australia) Eben Leroux	(Australia) Robbie Fernandez
2009	(Australia) Derek Boyer	(Australia) Eben Leroux	(Australia) Luke Reynolds
2010	(Australia) Derek Boyer	(Australia) Marc Wells	(Australia) Eben Leroux
2011	(Australia) Derek Boyer	(Australia) Eben Leroux	(Australia) Daniel Macri
2012	(Australia) Mike Vrljic	(Australia) Jordan Steffens	(Australia) Marc Wells
2013	(Australia) Warrick Brant	(To be confirmed)	(To be confirmed)
2014	(Australia) Warrick Brant	(Australia) Daniel Macri	(Australia) Jorden Steffens
2015	(Australia) Warrick Brant	(New Zealand) Colm Woulfe	(Australia) Luke Reynolds
2016	(Australia) Rongo Keene	(Australia) Tyson Morissey	(Australia) Travis Wieck
2017	(Australia) Eddie Williams	(Australia) Vernon Van Schalkwyk	(Australia) Jean-Stephen Coraboeuf
2018	(Australia) Eddie Williams	(Australia) Jean-Stephen Coraboeuf	(Australia) Eben Le Roux
2019	(Australia) Jean-Stephen Coraboeuf	(Australia) Thomas Wren	(Australia) Corey Polkinghorne
2022	(Australia) Jordan Osborne	(Australia) Aidan Canini	(Australia) Fadi El Masri
2023	(Australia) Josh Patacca	(Australia) Ryan Rullis	(Australia) Macauley Tinker
2024	(Australia) Jordan Osborne	(Australia) Josh Patacca	(Australia) Macauley Tinker
2025	(Australia) BJ Stone	(Australia) Ryan Rullis	(Australia) Bradman Houston
2026	(Australia) Bradman Houston	(Australia) Dylan Lockard	(Australia) BJ Stone

=== Repeat champions ===
Champions	Times & years
(Australia) Derek Boyer	12 (2000, 2001, 2002, 2003, 2004, 2005, 2006, 2007, 2008, 2009, 2010, 2011)
(Australia) Bill Lyndon	5 (1993,1994,1996, 1998, 1999)
(Australia) Warrick Brant	3 (2013, 2014, 2015)
(Australia) Jordan Osborne	2 (2022, 2024)
(Australia) Eddie Williams	2 (2017, 2018)

== See also ==
- List of strongman competitions
