= Regin Vágadal =

Faroese strength athlete

Personal information
- Born: 22 March 1970 (age 56) Faroe Islands
- Occupation: Strongman
- Height: 6 ft 1.5 in (1.87 m)
Medal record
Strongman
Representing Faroe Islands
World's Strongest Man
8th	1996 World's Strongest Man
Qualified	1997 World's Strongest Man
Qualified	1999 World's Strongest Man
8th	2000 World's Strongest Man
Qualified	2001 World's Strongest Man
Atlantic Giant/Faroe Grand Prix
2nd	1999
World Muscle Power Championships
3rd	1997
Atlantic Giant/Faroe Grand Prix
2nd	1999
1st	2000
1st	2001
Faroe Island's Strongest Man
1st	1994
1st	1995
1st	1996
1st	1997
1st	1998
1st	1999
1st	2000
Iceland's Strongest Man
1st	1998
Westfjord's Viking
1st	1998

Regin Vágadal (born 22 March 1970) is a former strongman from the Faroe Islands. He was seven times Faroe Islands Strongest Man from 1994 to 2000. He also participated in the World's Strongest Man finals between 1996 and 2000.

== Biography ==
Vágadal was born on the 22 March 1970 in the Faroe Islands. During his childhood he lived for 3 years in Nuuk Greenland.

At the age of 15, he started working on a shrimp trawler. He worked here until 1989, In 1990 he worked on board a cargo-liner. That year he also started working as a carpenter with his uncle. During the weekend he had a job as a bouncer. In 1995 Regin started his study at the Navigation School and completed this with a Masters certificate for ship-master. 1995 was also the year started training.

In 1996 he was invited to the World's Strongest Man for the first time and made it to the final where he finished 8th. In 1997 he was invited again to the World's Strongest Man but did not make it past the qualifying heats. This year he also competed in the World Muscle Power Classic where he placed third behind Raimonds Bergmanis and Mark Philippi. In 1999 he finished second in Europe's Strongest Man and again competed in the World's Strongest Man but did not make it past the qualifying heats. In 2000 he reached the final of the tournament for the second time where he finished 8th. The following year he competed for the last time in the World's Strongest Man where he did not qualify for the final. He also won Faroe Islands Strongest Man seven times in a row from 1994 to 2000 and won Iceland's Strongest Man in 1998.

== Honours ==
- 7 times Faroe Islands Strongest Man (1994–2000)
- 8th place World's Strongest Man (1996)
- 3rd place in "World Muscle Power Champs 1997"
- 1st place in "Iceland Strongest man 1998"
- 8th place World's Strongest Man (2000)
- 2nd place in "Atlantic Giant 1999"
- 1st place in "Atlantic Giant 2000"
- 1st place in "Atlantic Giant 2001"

== Personal records ==
- Squat – 340 kg (750 lb) (Raw)
- Bench press – 235 kg (518 lb) (Raw)
- Deadlift – 350 kg (772 lb) (Raw)
- Natural stone lift to platform – 5 Rocks from 100–180 kg (220–397 lb) to distant platforms in 37.24 seconds (1999 Atlantic Giant) (World Record)
- Latra stones loading onto barrels – 4 stones weighing 96–177 kg (212–390 lb) in 33.88 seconds (1998 Westfjord's Viking)
- Keg toss – 12.5 kg (28 lb) over 5.90 metres (19 ft 4 in) (1999 IFSA Hungary Grand Prix)
- Keg toss – 20 kg (44 lb) over 5.00 metres (16 ft 5 in) (1997 European Open)
