= Grant Edwards =

Personal information
- Born: Australia
- Occupation: Strongman
Medal record
Strongman
Representing Australia
World's Strongest Man
Qualified	1999
Australia's Strongest Man
1st	1999

Grant Edwards APM is a retired Australian Federal Police commander, author, mental health advocate and former athlete and strongman competitor. He represented Australia in athletics and bobsleigh and competed in the World's Strongest Man competition

== Biography ==
Edwards served with the Australian Federal Police for 34 years, including senior international postings in Timor-Leste, Afghanistan and the United States, and was awarded the Australian Police Medal in 2017. Alongside his policing career, he represented Australia in athletics and bobsleigh, was selected to the Australian University Sport Green and Gold athletics team, won Australia's Strongest Man and competed at the 1999 World's Strongest Man. He has also competed internationally in powerlifting and at the World Police and Fire Games, where he holds records in throwing and strength events.

== Early life and education ==
Edwards attended East Hills Boys High School in Sydney, where he was Senior School Prefect and represented the school in athletics, rugby and basketball. In 1980, he received the school's C. H. Little Cup for Senior Athlete and the Douglas Bailey Memorial Award for Prefect of the Year. While at East Hills, Edwards competed in Athletics, Basketball and Rugby Union. Following shot put and hammer throw performances at the NSW Combined High Schools, NSW All Schools and Australian All Schools championships, he was selected for a New South Wales secondary schools athletics tour of the United States in 1981.

Edwards later studied at the Australian National University, graduating with a Bachelor of Arts in 1998, with studies in anthropology, Australian history and Indigenous studies. He subsequently completed postgraduate studies in policing, executive leadership and leadership, policy and governance at Charles Sturt University.

== Sporting career ==
=== Athletics ===
Edwards competed in athletics from his school years, specialising in the throwing events. In 1980 he represented New South Wales at the Australian All Schools Championships, winning [silver in Shot Put] and [bronze in Hammer Throw] {Torch Newspaper 13 May 1981). In 1981 he was selected for a New South Wales secondary schools athletics tour of the United States {Aero Press May 1981} , where Olympic decathlete Peter Hadfield was sportsmaster. In 1981, Edwards was selected for a New South Wales secondary schools athletics team for a four-week tour of the United States, managed by Hadfield.{Official website New South Wales Department of Education – East Hills Boys High School} In 1982, Edwards represented Australia in Track and Field in the shot put and hammer throw at Seoul Junior Olympics, South Korea gaining a bronze medal. Championships in Seoul, South Korea, where he won a bronze medal in the shot put. He continued competing in athletics at senior level and won the New South Wales hammer throw championship in 1989. In 1996, he was selected to the Australian University Sport Green and Gold athletics team in recognition of his performances at the Australian University Games.

=== Strength sports ===
Grant Edwards competed on the international circuit prior to his initial 1997 triumph in Australia's Strongest Man. He was well known for displays of strength and in the greatest feats of strength section of the 2001 edition of Guinness Book of Records, Grant Edwards was picked out for special mention for his feat of single-handedly pulling a 201-ton steam locomotive a distance of 36.8 metres along a railroad track at Thirlmere, NSW, Australia, on 4 April 1996. The 1999 win in Australia's Strongest Man led to an invitation to the prestigious World's Strongest Man in 1999. Drawn in the same group as Magnus Samuelsson, Edwards was directly matched up against the Swede in the log lift, losing 10 lifts to 2. Magnus won the group and Edwards failed to progress to the final. Edwards also pulled the 386 Tall Ship 'Bounty' in Sydney Harbour a distance of 25 metres on 3 April 1996. as well as a 220-ton steam locomotive for charity in Canberra in 1997. Other feats of strength include pulling C130 Military Aircraft at Richmond NSW for charity live on the former Channel 9 Midday Show with Kerri-Anne.

Over the course of his strongman career, Edwards performed feats of strength on programs such as the Footy Show, Hey Hey it's Saturday and the Bert Newton Show. He appeared on Nine's Wide World of Sports, Channel Seven's Sportsworld and ESPN.

Edwards was also a Highland Games competitor. One of his notable achievements was winning the Scottish heavy throws contest at the 1997 Rosneath and Clynder Highland Games. He totalled 30 points to defeat Robert McKee (US) and Ivo Degelling (Netherlands) who finished second equal with 27 points.

In 1991 Edwards would change tack and became a member of the Australian Bobsleigh Team competing in the World Cup circuit throughout Europe and North America and as a member of the 1992 Australian Winter Olympic Squad. He was also one of the original Australians to secure an American Football scholarship at the University of Hawaii in 1982.

Outside of his strongman and sporting career, Edwards pursued a career within the Australian police. He joined the Australian Federal Police (AFP) in 1985 and worked in Sydney, Newcastle, Canberra, Timor-Leste, Afghanistan and twice in the USA Los Angeles and Washington D.Covering such areas as family law, international drug trafficking and people smuggling. He established the AFP's Transnational Sexual Exploitation and Trafficking Team in 2003, which addresses crimes of transnational sexual exploitation and travelling child sex offenders. From here he took the position of Chair of the Interpol Expert working Group on trafficking in Women and Children, becoming an international expert in this field. He went on to work as the National Surveillance Coordinator, Coordinator of Transnational Crime Intelligence and in 2006 gained promotion to Commander, in his capacity as Manager Criminal Intelligence Collection. In January 2008, Commander Edwards was posted to East Timor (Timor-Leste) as Security Advisor to the Secretary of State for Security within the Government of East Timor. His work within this role was praised by the Minister for Home Affairs, Brendan O'Connor, who echoed and endorsed comments made by the East Timor Prime Minister Xanana Gusmão. O'Connor said "Praise from the Prime Minister of Timor-Leste His Excellency Kay Rala Xanana Gusmão today, is testament to Commander Edwards' professionalism and the dedication that he has brought to the role. His efforts have gone a long way to strengthening relationships between Australia and Timor-Leste".

Preceded by Bill Lyndon	Australia's Strongest Man; 1999	Succeeded by Derek Boyer
