= Andrew Raynes =

- Born: Andrew Raynes; 7 April 1973 (age 52); Barnsley, England
- Other names: "Stumpy"
- Occupation(s): Bodybuilder, strongman, powerlifter
- Height: 5 ft 3 in (1.60 m)

Competition record

Men's bodybuilding

Representing United Kingdom

Mr. Universe (amateur)
1st	1998	short class
1st	1999	short class

NABBA Mr. England
1st	1998	

NABBA Junior Mr. Britain
1st	1994	

NABBA Junior Mr. Northeast
1st	1990	
1st	1994	

Strongman

Representing United Kingdom

World's Strongest Man
10th	2001 World's Strongest Man	

IFSA
10th	2000 China Grand Prix	
1st	2001 Portugal Grand Prix	
2nd	2001 Scotland Grand Prix	

Representing England

Britain's Strongest Man
8th	Britain's Strongest Man 2000	
10th	Britain's Strongest Man 2001	
6th	Britain's Strongest Man 2002	
7th	Britain's Strongest Man 2003	
6th	Britain's Strongest Man 2004	

England's Strongest Man
2nd	England's Strongest Man 2001	
3rd	England's Strongest Man 2004	

Britain's Strongest Man(IFSA)
3rd	Britain's Strongest Man(IFSA) 2005	

Powerlifting

Representing United Kingdom

WPC British Powerlifting Championships
1st	1996	110kg

WPC Junior World Powerlifting Championships
3rd	1995	110kg

WPC Junior European Powerlifting Championships
1st	1995	110kg

WPC Junior British Powerlifting Championships
1st	1995	110kg

Andrew Raynes (born 7 April 1973), commonly known as "Stumpy", is an English former strongman, powerlifter, and bodybuilder. He was a multiple time finalist in Britain's Strongest Man and a finalist of the 2001 World's Strongest Man contest.

== Career ==
Raynes began competing in bodybuilding as a junior competitor in 1990, winning the NABBA Junior Mr. Northeast contest in 1990 and again in 1994. He would also go on to win the NABBA Junior Mr. Britain contest in 1994. Raynes won the 1998 NABBA Mr. England overall title, and the Mr. Universe Amateur title in the short class in 1998 & 1999.

Raynes competed in the World Powerlifting Congress organization, winning the WPC Junior British Powerlifting Championships as well as the WPC Junior European Powerlifting Championships in 1995. He would also go on to win the WPC British Powerlifting Championships in 1996.

Raynes began competing in strongman in 2000, competing in both Britain's Strongest Man and the IFSA China Grand Prix.

Raynes also went on to compete in both Britain's Strongest Man and England's Strongest Man over the next several years. He was a finalist at the 2001 World's Strongest Man contest, finishing in 10th place overall.

Raynes was trained by 1989 World's Strongest Man winner Jamie Reeves at his gym in Sheffield. His sporting heroes are Bill Kazmaier, Jon Pall Sigmarsson and Mike Tyson.

== Personal records ==
- Squat – 380 kg
- Deadlift – 370 kg
- Log Lift – 165 kg
- Apollon's Axle – 175 kg
