= Ole Martin Hansen =

Norwegian strongman

Personal information
- Nationality: Norwegian
- Born: 13 January 1981 (age 45)
- Occupation: Strongman
- Height: 6 ft 1.5 in (1.87 m)
- Weight: 135–140 kg (298–309 lb)
Medal record
Strongman
Representing Norway
World's Strongest Man
Qualified	2012 World's Strongest Man
Qualified	2015 World's Strongest Man
Giants Live
2nd	2013 Giants Live Norway
Strongman Champions League
5th	2014 SCL World Finals
Battle of the North
5th	2014 Battle of the North
3rd	2015 Battle of the North
3rd	2017 Battle of the North (Burn Showdown)
Norway's Strongest Man
5th	2009
4th	2010
1st	2012
1st	2013
1st	2014
1st	2015
2nd	2016

Ole Martin Hansen (born 13 January 1981) is a Norwegian strongman from Krokstadelva.

Hansen participated in his first Norway's Strongest Man competition in 2009 where he emerged fifth place, and became the champion by 2012. He went on to win 4 consecutive titles to break Svend Karlsen's record for the most titles.

In his first appearance at the 2012 World's Strongest Man held in Los Angeles, California, he participated in the fourth qualifier group where Vytautas Lalas and Ervin Katona made it to the finals. In his second appearance in the 2015 World's Strongest Man he participated in the fifth qualifier group where Mike Burke and Eddie Hall made it to the finals.

Hansen's career best performances came in 2013 Giants Live Norway where he won second place behind Johannes Årsjö. He also won third at 2015 Battle of the North and 2017 Burn Showdown.

== Personal records ==
- Raw deadlift (with straps) – 350 kg (772 lb) (2016 Norway's Strongest Man)
- Log press – 170 kg (375 lb) (2013 Europe's Strongest Man)
- Crucifix hold – 15 kg (33 lb) for 74.82 seconds (2012 Norway's Strongest Man) (World Record)
