= Arild Haugen =

Norwegian strongman

- Occupations: Strongman, Boxer
- Height: 1.89 m (6 ft 2 1/2 in)

Arild "Hulk" Haugen (born 30 December 1985) is a former strongman and boxer from Sirdal Municipality, Norway.

At the age of 20 years and 267 days, he became the second youngest World's Strongest Man competitor in history when he participated at 2006 World's Strongest Man group 1. He currently lives in Sandnes, Rogaland.

== Career ==
=== Strongman ===
Haugen's first competition was 2006 Norway's Strongest Man, and after winning second place to Svend Karlsen, he qualified himself to enter international circuit with organizers such as World Strongman Cup Federation and Strongman Super Series. In 2006 World's Strongest Man, he couldn't qualify to the finals.

Critiques suggested that Haugen had good potential, and in future would have rivaled Mariusz Pudzianowski; specially with his performance in the 2008 World's Strongest Man - group 4 where he broke the world record for the 5 Atlas Stones run (light set) 100–180 kg (220–397 lb) in just 16.14 seconds to successfully make the finals of the contest. He won 2008 Strongman Super Series Viking Power Challenge and Norway's Strongest Man back to back in 2007 and 2008.

In his prime, he was capable of a 370 kilograms (820 lb) squat, a 400 kilograms (880 lb) deadlift (strongman standards, which remained the Norwegian national record for 18 years), a 250 kilograms (550 lb) bench press and a 180 kilograms (400 lb) axle press.

=== Boxing ===
Haugen's first fight as a boxer was in December 2009 against Latvian Pāvels Dolgovs. He won by knockout 45 seconds into the first round. Haugen officially became a member of TreyWay Maudland after his first fight. In 2010 he fought Serbian Sejfula Berisa and Ivorian Jean Vidal Yemou and won both fights.

== Personal records ==
- Deadlift – 400 kg (882 lb) (2008 Strongman Super Series Viking Power Challenge) (Former Norwegian Record)
- Tyre flip – 550 kg (1,213 lb) x 6 flips in 29.80 seconds (2008 Strongman Super Series Viking Power Challenge) (World Record)
- 5 Atlas Stones run – 100–180 kg (220–397 lb) 16.14 seconds (2008 World's Strongest Man - group 4) (former world record)
