= Germany's Strongest Man =

Annual strongman competition

Tournament information
- Location: Germany
- Established: 1994
- Format: Multi-event competition

Current champion
- (Germany) Patrick Eibel (2026)

Germany's Strongest Man (German: Stärkster Mann Deutschlands) is an annual strongman competition held by the German Federation of Strength Athletes (GFSA). Heinz Ollesch holds the record for most wins with 12 wins.

== League structure and qualification system ==
On the men's side the sport of strongman in Germany is divided into three leagues - The ATX Power League (third division), the Deutschland Cup Series (second division) and the German Pro League (first division). Beginners can also optionally participate in a Beginner Cup as their first competition.

The ATX Power League (third division) was added to the two existing leagues in the 2021 season and consists of several competitions held throughout the year. After each competition, the top-placed German athletes are promoted to the second division, with the number of promotions depending on the number of participants. For every ten participating athletes, one athlete is promoted. The top athlete in the U105 weight class is also promoted to the second division.

With the introduction of the German Pro League in 2014, the Deutschland Cup Series became the second division in German strongman. Several competitions are held throughout the season, in which the top 20 German athletes earn points based on their results. Double points are awarded for the final competition of the season, and if an athlete competes three or more times in one season, his worst result is discarded. At the end of the season, the three athletes with the most points are promoted to the German Pro League. Athletes ranked fourth and fifth can either be promoted to the first division or compete for another season at Deutschland Cup level.

Like the Deutschland Cup Series, the German Pro League includes several competitions per season in which athletes can collect points toward qualification for the German Championships. Here, too, the top 20 athletes in a competition receive points, and if an athlete competes three or more times in one season, his worst result is discarded.

In 2023 the current qualification system with 12 spots was introduced, where athletes can qualify via the following pathways:

- As champion of the previous year's competition
- As a top-10-athlete in the current German Pro League season
- As the overall leader of the current Deutschland Cup season up to the german championship

If a qualified athlete chooses not to compete, the next athlete in the German Pro League ranking can move up.

== Champions breakdown ==
Year	Champion	Runner-up	3rd place	Location
1994	(Germany) Heinz Ollesch	(To be confirmed)	(To be confirmed)	
1995	(Germany) Heinz Ollesch	(To be confirmed)	(To be confirmed)	
1996	(Germany) Heinz Ollesch	(To be confirmed)	(To be confirmed)	
1997	(Germany) Heinz Ollesch	(To be confirmed)	(To be confirmed)	
1998	(Germany) Heinz Ollesch	(To be confirmed)	(To be confirmed)	
1999	(Germany) Heinz Ollesch	(To be confirmed)	(To be confirmed)	
2000	(Germany) Heinz Ollesch	(To be confirmed)	(To be confirmed)	
2001	(Germany) Heinz Ollesch	(Germany) Martin Muhr	(Germany) Carsten Kühn	Rosenheim
2002	(Germany) Heinz Ollesch	(To be confirmed)	(To be confirmed)	
2003	(Germany) Heinz Ollesch	(To be confirmed)	(To be confirmed)	
2004	(Germany) Heinz Ollesch	(To be confirmed)	(To be confirmed)	
2005	(Germany) Dieter Seidenkranz	(Germany) Franz Müllner	(Germany) Dietmar Zint	Rosenheim
2006	(Germany) Heinz Ollesch	(Germany) Florian Trimpl	(Germany) Knut Handke	
2007	(Germany) Igor Werner	(Germany) Florian Trimpl	(Germany) Raik Seume	
2008	(Germany) Tobias Ide	(Germany) Igor Werner	(Germany) Jens Thamm	
2009	(Germany) Florian Trimpl	(Germany) Tobias Ide	(Germany) Steffen Hayn	
2010	(Germany) Igor Werner	(Germany) Patrik Baboumian	(Germany) Robert Heinrich	Waging am See
2011	(Germany) Patrik Baboumian	(Germany) Daniel Wildt	(Germany) Anton Schimke	Waging am See
2012	(Germany) Timo Rüdiger	(Germany) Mateusz Skrentny	(Germany) Patrik Baboumian	Waging am See
2013	(Germany) Daniel Wildt	(Germany) Robert Heinrich	(Germany) Patrik Baboumian	Waging am See
2014	(Germany) Michael Blumstein	(Germany) Daniel Wildt	(Germany) Dennis Kohlruss	
2015	(Germany) Andreas Altmann	(Germany) Raffael Gordzielik	(Germany) Julian Groth	
2016	(Germany) Andreas Altmann	(Germany) Raffael Gordzielik	(Germany) Dennis Kohlruss	
2017	(Germany) Raffael Gordzielik	(Germany) Dennis Kohlruss	(Germany) Sebastian Kraus	Bruckmühl
2018	(Germany) Raffael Gordzielik	(Germany) Dennis Kohlruss	(Germany) Sebastian Kraus	Bad Tölz
2019	(Germany) Raffael Gordzielik	(Germany) Dennis Biesenbach	(Germany) Sebastian Kraus	Bad Tölz
2020	Event not held			
2021	(Germany) Dennis Kohlruss	(Germany) Sebastian Kraus	(Germany) Adam Roszkowski	Gera
2022	(Germany) Dennis Kohlruss	(Germany) Tim Hruby	(Germany) Patrick Eibel	Gera
2023	(Germany) Dennis Kohlruss	(Germany) Patrick Eibel	(Germany) Markus Schätzl	Gera
2024	(Germany) Dennis Kohlruss	(Germany) Patrick Eibel	(Germany) Alex Zahn	Steinmauern
2025	(Germany) Dennis Kohlruss	(Germany) Dennis Schäfer	(Germany) Albin Hasanovic	Steinmauern
2026	(Germany) Patrick Eibel	(Germany) Philipp Zorn	(Germany) Volker Bauer	

=== Repeat champions ===
Five athletes won the competition multiple times. Out of these winners, only Dennis Kohlruss is still actively competing at the time of the 2026 season.

Athlete	Wins	Years	Athlete still active
(Germany) Heinz Ollesch	12	1994, 1995, 1996, 1997, 1998, 1999, 2000, 2001, 2002, 2003, 2004, 2006	No
(Germany) Dennis Kohlruss	5	2021, 2022, 2023, 2024, 2025	Yes
(Germany) Raffael Gordzielik	3	2017, 2018, 2019	No
(Germany) Andreas Altmann	2	2015, 2016	No
(Germany) Igor Werner	2	2007, 2010	No

== Weight class champions ==
In addition to the open weight class the title "Germany's Strongest Man" is also awarded in the lighter weight classes.

- In the U80 class the first championship was held in 2025. Kilian Mercier won the competition.
- In the U90 class the first title was awarded to Szymon Peplinski as the highest placing athlete under 90 kg competing in the U105 championship. Since 2023 the U90 championship is held annually as a standalone competition. Szymon Peplinski and Maximilian Wunderlich are the record holders with 2 wins each.
- In the U105 class the national title was initially awarded to the highest placing athlete under 105 kg in the open weight class championships. Since 2018 the U105 championship is held as an annual standalone competition. Voker Bauer is the record holder with four wins (2022, 2024, 2025, 2026).
- In the U120 class the first championship was held in 2025. Leonard Zimmermann was the winner.

Year	U80 Champion	U90 Champion	U105 Champion	U120 Champion
2006	(Event not held)	(Event not held)	(Germany) Robert Heinrich	(Event not held)
2007	(Event not held)	(Event not held)	(Germany) Patrick Baboumian	(Event not held)
2008	(Event not held)	(Event not held)	(Germany) Mirko Rothe	(Event not held)
2009	(Event not held)	(Event not held)	(Germany) Patrik Baboumian (2)	(Event not held)
2010	(Event not held)	(Event not held)	(Germany) Andreas Starzer	(Event not held)
2011	(Event not held)	(Event not held)	(Germany) Oliver Nell	(Event not held)
2012	(Event not held)	(Event not held)	(Germany) Oliver Nell (2)	(Event not held)
2013	(Event not held)	(Event not held)	(Germany) Mirko Rothe (2)	(Event not held)
2014	(Event not held)	(Event not held)	(Germany) Andreas Starzer (2)	(Event not held)
2015	(Event not held)	(Event not held)	(Germany) Andreas Starzer (3)	(Event not held)
2016	(Event not held)	(Event not held)	(Germany) Lukas Neumayer	(Event not held)
2017	(Event not held)	(Event not held)	(Event not held)	(Event not held)
2018	(Event not held)	(Germany) Szymon Peplinski	(Germany) Oliver Nell (3)	(Event not held)
2019	(Event not held)	(Event not held)	(Germany) Lukas Neumayer (2)	(Event not held)
2020	(Event not held)	(Event not held)	(Event not held)	(Event not held)
2021	(Event not held)	(Event not held)	(Germany) Lukas Neumayer (3)	(Event not held)
2022	(Event not held)	(Event not held)	(Germany) Volker Bauer	(Event not held)
2023	(Event not held)	(Germany) Szymon Peplinski (2)	(Germany) Tim Hruby	(Event not held)
2024	(Event not held)	(Germany) Yago Kracht	(Germany) Volker Bauer (2)	(Event not held)
2025	(Germany) Kilian Mercier	(Germany) Maximilian Wunderlich	(Germany) Volker Bauer (3)	(Germany) Leonard Zimmermann
2026	(Germany) Arkon David	(Germany) Maximilian Wunderlich (2)	(Germany) Volker Bauer (4)	(Germany) Max Weißenberg
