= Espen Aune =

Norwegian strength athlete

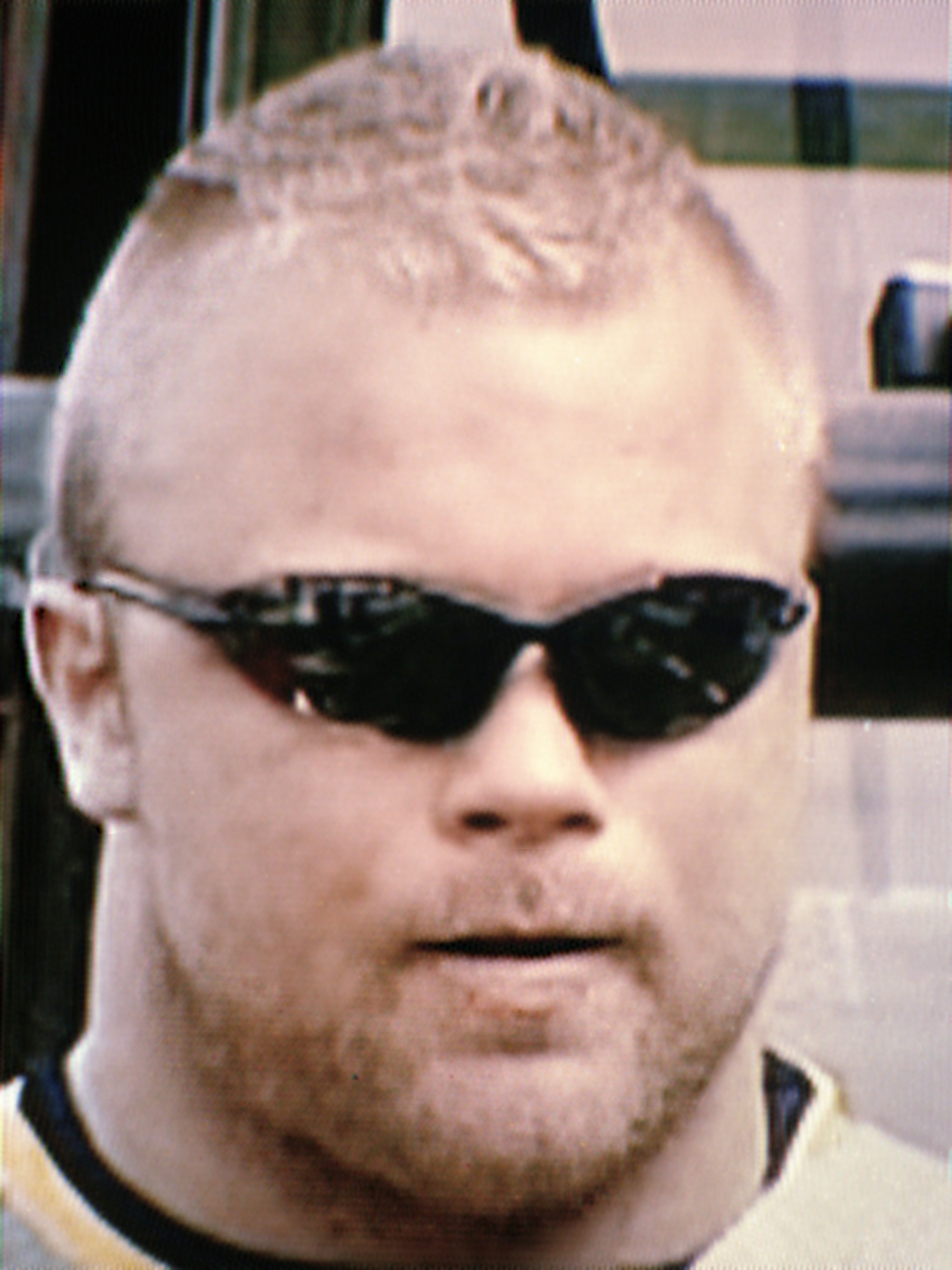

Personal information
- Born: Norway
- Occupation: Strongman
- Height: 6 ft 0 in (1.83 m)
Medal record
Strongman
Representing Norway
Strongman Super Series
7th	2007 Viking Power Challenge
10th	2008 Viking Power Challenge
6th	2010 Sweden Super Series
Norway's Strongest Man
4th	2002
6th	2003
2nd	2004
4th	2005
5th	2006
2nd	2007
7th	2009
2nd	2010
1st	2011

Espen Aune (born 1982) is a Norwegian professional strongman competitor and winner of the 2011 Norway's Strongest Man.

== Personal Records ==
- Squat – 320 kilograms (710 lb)
- Bench press – 260 kilograms (570 lb)
- Deadlift – 340 kilograms (750 lb)
