= Jorma Ojanaho =

Finnish strength athlete

Personal information
- Born: 23.02.1970 Finland
- Occupation: Strongman
- Height: 188 cm (6 ft 2 in)
- Children: 3
Medal record
Strongman
Representing Finland
World's Strongest Man
6th	1996
Finland's Strongest Man
3rd	1994
1st	1996
3rd	1997

Jorma Ojanaho is a strongman competitor from Finland who is best known for competing in the 1996 World's Strongest Man competition, finishing in 6th place. Jorma won Finland's Strongest Man in 1994.
