= Richard Skog =

Norwegian strongman competitor (born 1981)

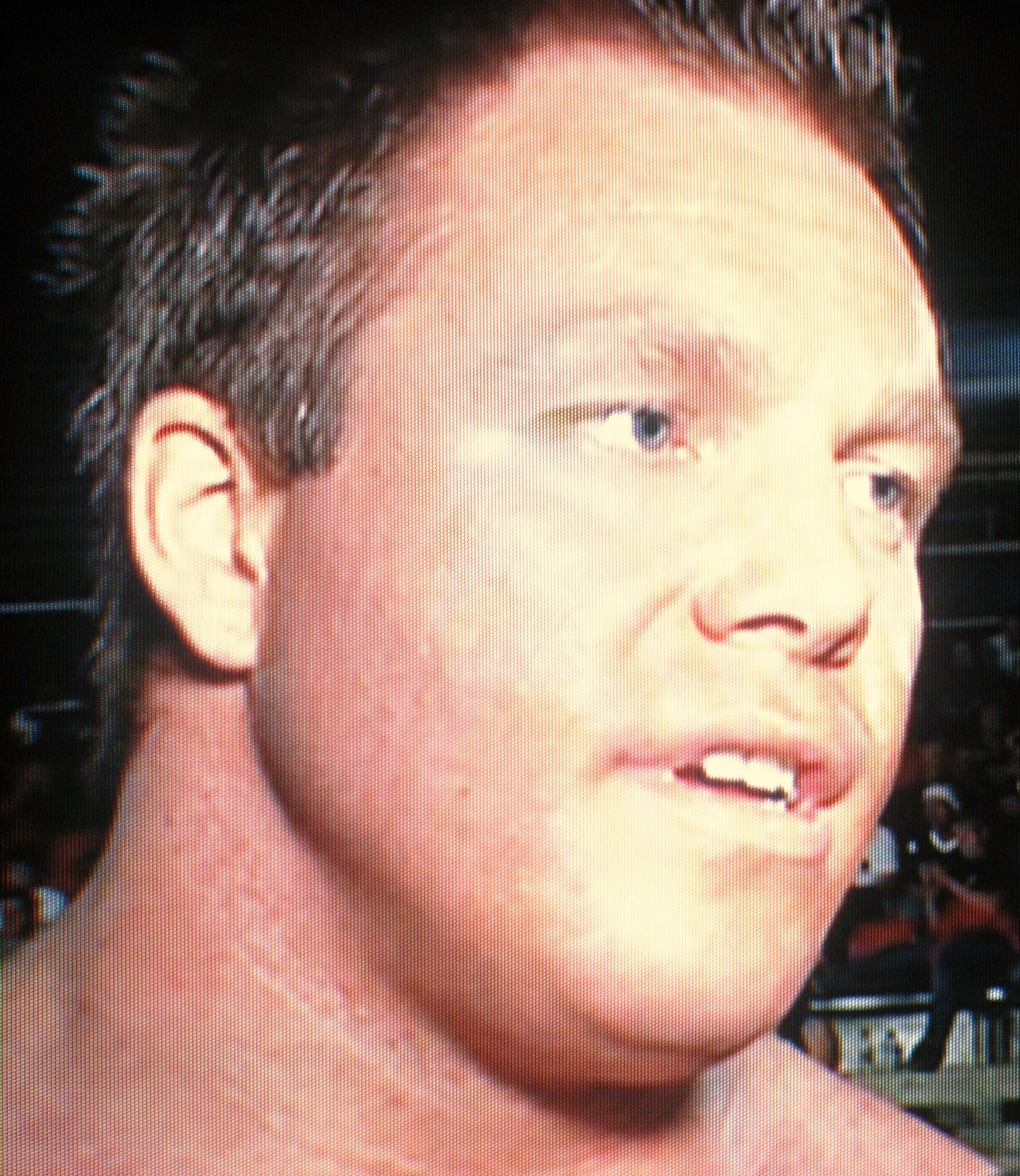

Personal information
- Born: 16 June 1981 (age 45) Norway
- Occupation: Strongman
- Height: 6 ft 6 in (1.98 m)
Medal record
Strongman
Representing Norway
World's Strongest Man
Qualified	2007 World's Strongest Man
Qualified	2008 World's Strongest Man
Qualified	2009 World's Strongest Man
Qualified	2010 World's Strongest Man
Strongman Super Series
3rd	2008 Viking Power Challenge
3rd	2008 Sweden Super Series
2nd	2009 Viking Power Challenge
Norway's Strongest Man
4th	2007
2nd	2008
1st	2009
1st	2010
Jón Páll Sigmarsson Classic
6th	2010
Norway's Strongest Viking
2nd	2009

Richard Skog (born 16 June 1981) is a Norwegian strongman competitor. Before life as strongman he was a member of the Norwegian Armed Forces.

== Strongman career ==
He was a part of the World's Strongest Man competition for four straight years in 2007-2010, but has yet to qualify for the finals. Skog also placed third at two World's Strongest Man Super Series events in 2008. He placed second in Norway's Strongest Viking and Viking Power Challenge in 2009.

Skog has won the Norway's Strongest Man competition twice, in 2009 and 2010, his career best wins.

== Personal records ==
- Fingal's Fingers – 350 kg (772 lb) 5 fingers in 42.30 seconds (2009 Norway's Strongest Man) (World Record)

== Acting ==
Skog played the role of Oddjob, Frank Tagliano's bodyguard, in the Netflix original series Lilyhammer. He currently plays the role of Sturla Beinknuser/Sturla Bonecrusher in the Norwegian and English language versions of NRK1 series, Norsemen.
