= Dennis Kohlruss =

German strongman

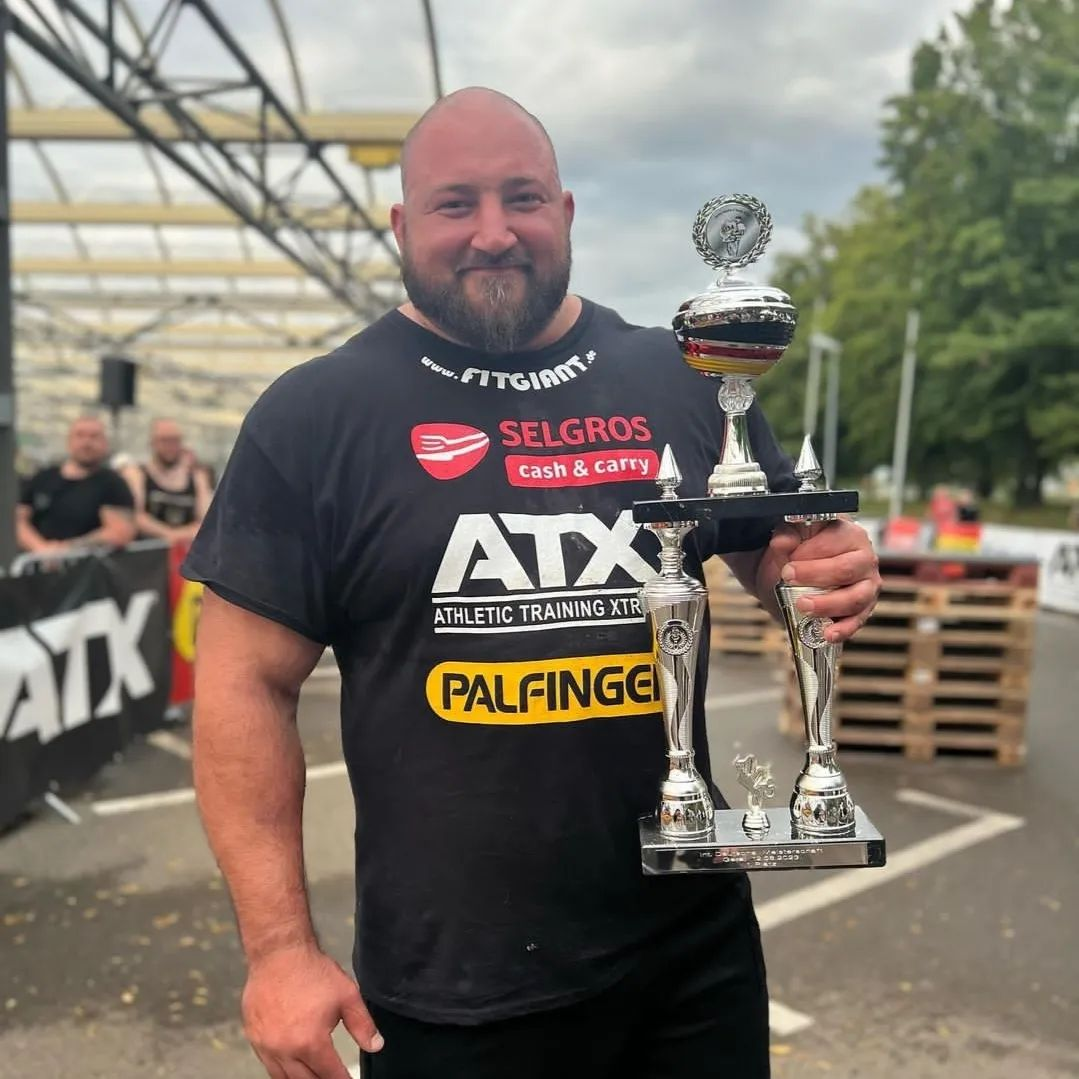

Personal information
- Nationality: German
- Born: 14 May 1988 (age 38)
- Occupation: Strongman
- Height: 6 ft 4.5 in (1.94 m)
- Weight: 165–175 kg (364–386 lb)
Medal record
Strongman
Representing Germany
World's Strongest Viking
2nd	2018 World's Strongest Viking
Europe's Strongest Man
9th	2023 Europe's Strongest Man
Strongman Champions League
3rd	2017 SCL FIBO
3rd	2017 SCL Greece
3rd	2018 SCL Holland
2nd	2019 SCL Turkey
1st	2020 SCL World Record Breakers
3rd	2024 SCL Martinique
Megatron
1st	2021 Megatron
Germany's Strongest Man
3rd	2014 Germany's Strongest Man
3rd	2016 Germany's Strongest Man
2nd	2017 Germany's Strongest Man
2nd	2018 Germany's Strongest Man
1st	2021 Germany's Strongest Man
1st	2022 Germany's Strongest Man
1st	2023 Germany's Strongest Man
1st	2024 Germany's Strongest Man
1st	2025 Germany's Strongest Man

Dennis Kohlruss (born 14 May 1988) is a German strongman competitor from Rastatt and the reigning 5 x times Germany's Strongest Man. He's also a regular entrant to the Strongman Champions League and a seven time podium finisher. He has competed in 33 International strongman competitions and has won the 2020 SCL World Record Breakers and 2021 Megatron competitions.

== Background ==
At the age of 21, during his military service in the Bundeswehr, he stumbled across YouTube videos of 1998 World's Strongest Man Magnus Samuelsson and found enthusiasm for the sport of strongman.

In Bavaria, there's a 185 kg (408 lb) stone named 'Kohlruss stone' in his honour. He was the first person to shoulder it.

== Personal records ==
In competition:

- Deadlift – 350 kg (772 lb) x 2 reps
- Elevated Deadlift (18" partial lift/ side handles) – 500 kg (1,102 lb)
- Atlas Stone to shoulder – 200 kg (441 lb) (German Record)
- Log press (SCL giant log) – 200 kg (441 lb) (German Record)
- Log press for reps – 170 kg (375 lb) x 3 reps
- Louis Cyr Dumbbell press – 110 kg (243 lb)
- Viking press – 165 kg (364 lb) x 6 reps
- Keg press – 160.5 kg (354 lb) (World Record)
- Block press – 136.1 kg (300 lb) (German Record)
- Natural Stone press – 128 kg (282 lb) (German Record)
- Fingal's fingers – 220 kg (485 lb) x 5 reps in 79 seconds
- Helicopter pull (harness only/ no rope) – 4,400 kg (9,700 lb) for 20 meter course in 21.78 seconds (2018 SCL Romania) (World Record)
- Truck pull – 15,000 kg (33,069 lb) for 30 meter course in 33.28 seconds (2017 SCL Greece) (World Record)

In training:

- Louis Cyr Dumbbell press – 124.5 kg (274 lb) (Unofficial German Record)
- Natural Stone to shoulder – 185 kg (408 lb) (Unofficial German Record)
- Plate flipping pinch – 30 kg (66 lb) ATX plate
- Plate flipping pinch – 20 kg (44 lb) 'standard' deep dish plate x 15 times

== Filmography ==
Television

Year	Title	Role	Notes
2016-2018	World's Strongest Man	Himself - Contestant	Series 39, Episode 1; Series 41, Episode 3
2022	Der Mann im Mond - (Songs aus der Bohne)	Jus größter Fan	Series1, Episode 4
2023	Tigerenten Club	Himself	1 Episode
