= Italy's Strongest Man =

Sports Competition

Tournament information
- Location: Italy
- Established: 2012
- Format: Multi-event competition

Current champion
- Paolo Acquaviva (2025)

Italy's Strongest Man (Italian: L'uomo più forte d'Italia) is an annual strongman competition held in Italy and featuring exclusively Italian athletes. The contest was established in 2012. Alessandro Castelli holds the record for most wins with 3 titles, while Marco Guidi has 2 titles.

It is a multi event competition that tests competitors in a number of different lifts and events. The winner is decided by the aggregate across all events. The competition has been held in Tirrenia, Forcoli, Florence and Vicopisano.

== Champions breakdown ==
Year	Champion	Runner-up	3rd place
2012	(Italy) Claudio Randazzo	(Italy) Markus Maestroni	(Italy) Marco Guidi
2013	(Italy) Marco Guidi	(Italy) Maurizio Piazza	(Italy) Andrea Giomini
2014	(Italy) Alex Curletto	(Italy) Marco Guidi	(Italy) Emanuele Condoleo
2015	(Italy) Marco Guidi	(Italy) Francesco Gioia	(Italy) Emanuele Condoleo
2016	(Italy) Alessandro Castelli	(Italy) Marco Guidi	(Italy) Gian Paolo Pedna
2017	(Italy) Rafaelle Lotito	(Italy) Carlo Ceglia	(Italy) Francesco Gioia
2018	(Italy) Alessandro Castelli	(Italy) Michele Lestini	(Italy) Maksymilian Mioduszewski
2019	(Italy) Alessandro Castelli	(Italy) Michele Lestini	(Italy) Antonio Sternativo
2020–2021	Event not held		
2022	(Italy) Andrea Invernizzi	(Italy) Matteo Toninelli	(Italy) Paolo Acquaviva
2023	(Italy) Nicolas Cambi	(Italy) Andrea Invernizzi	(Italy) Alessandro Castelli
2024	(Italy) Emanuele Greco	(Italy) Paolo Acquaviva	(Italy) Francesco Videtta
2025	(Italy) Paolo Acquaviva	(Italy) Nicolas Cambi	(Italy) Francesco Videtta

=== Repeat champions ===
Champion	Times & years
(Italy) Alessandro Castelli	3 (2016, 2018, 2019)
(Italy) Marco Guidi	2 (2013, 2015)
