= Hungary's Strongest Man =

Strongman competition in Hungary

Tournament information
- Location: Hungary
- Format: Multi-event competition

Current champion
- (Hungary) Péter Juhász

Hungary's Strongest Man is an annual strongman competition held in Hungary and featuring exclusively Hungarian athletes. Initiated in 1988, it is one of the oldest national strongman competitions in the world.

László Fekete holds the record for most titles with 10 consecutive wins.

== Champions breakdown ==
Year	Champion	Runner-up	3rd place
1988	(Hungary) László Fekete	(To be confirmed)	(To be confirmed)
1989	(Hungary) László Fekete	(To be confirmed)	(To be confirmed)
1990	(Hungary) László Fekete	(To be confirmed)	(To be confirmed)
1991	(Hungary) László Fekete	(To be confirmed)	(To be confirmed)
1992	(Hungary) László Fekete	(To be confirmed)	(To be confirmed)
1993	(Hungary) László Fekete	(To be confirmed)	(To be confirmed)
1994	(Hungary) László Fekete	(To be confirmed)	(To be confirmed)
1995	(Hungary) László Fekete	(To be confirmed)	(To be confirmed)
1996	(Hungary) László Fekete	(To be confirmed)	(To be confirmed)
1997	(Hungary) László Fekete	(To be confirmed)	(To be confirmed)
1998	(Hungary) Mihály Ulvicki	(Hungary) Ádám Darázs	(Hungary) Gyula Kövér
1999	(Hungary) Ádám Darázs	(Hungary) Sándor Lóska	(Hungary) Gyula Kövér
2000	(Hungary) Sándor Lóska	(Hungary) Ádám Darázs	(Hungary) Mihály Ulvicki
2001	(Hungary) Mihály Ulvicki	(Hungary) Ádám Darázs	(Hungary) Gyula Kövér
2002	(Hungary) János Dávid	(Hungary) Mihály Ulvicki	(Hungary) István Borzi
2003	(Hungary) Ádám Darázs	(Hungary) István Borzi	(Hungary) Tamás Szabó
2004	(Hungary) Ádám Darázs	(Hungary) István Borzi	(Hungary) János Dávid
2005	(Hungary) Ádám Darázs	(Hungary) Tamás Malatinszky	(Hungary) János Dávid
2006	(Hungary) Péter Nagy	(Hungary) János Dávid	(Hungary) Gábor Forgács
2007	(Hungary) Tamás Malatinszky	(Hungary) Zsolt Endrei	(Hungary) János Keszler
2008	(Hungary) Zsolt Szabó	(Hungary) Tamás Malatinszky	(Hungary) Gábor Hrozik
2009	(Hungary) Péter Nagy	(Hungary) Zsolt Szabó	(Hungary) Lóránt Csikós
2010	(Hungary) Gábor Hrozik	(Hungary) Zsolt Szabó	(Hungary) Ákos Nagy
2011	(Hungary) Zsolt Szabó	(Hungary) Ákos Nagy	(Hungary) István Sárai
2012	(Hungary) Zsolt Szabó	(Hungary) Ákos Nagy	(Hungary) Tamás Hajnal
2013	(Hungary) Zsolt Szabó	(Hungary) Tamás Hajnal	(Hungary) Ákos Nagy
2014	(Hungary) Tamás Hajnal	(Hungary) János Sebestyén	(Hungary) Zoltán Ladamerczki
2015	(Hungary) Zsolt Szabó	(Hungary) Tamás Hajnal	(Hungary) Gábor Hrozik
2016	(Hungary) Tamás Hajnal	(Hungary) János Sebestyén	(Hungary) Erik Karácsondi
2017	(Hungary) János Sebestyén	(Hungary) Zsolt Molnár	(Hungary) Ferenc Varga
2018	(Hungary) Péter Juhász	(Hungary) János Sebestyén	(Hungary) Roni Kecskés
2019	(Hungary) Péter Juhász	(Hungary) Gábor Hrozik	(Hungary) Roni Kecskés
2020	(Hungary) Péter Juhász	(Hungary) János Sebestyén	(Hungary) Alex Véró

=== Repeat champions ===
Seven athletes won the competition multiple times.

Champion	Wins	Athlete still active
(Hungary) László Fekete	10	No
(Hungary) Zsolt Szabó	5	No
(Hungary) Ádám Darázs	4	No
(Hungary) Péter Juhász	3	Yes
(Hungary) Mihály Ulvicki	2	No
(Hungary) Péter Nagy	2	No
(Hungary) Tamás Hajnal	2	No
