= 1999 World's Strongest Man =

Strongman competition in 1999

Competition information
- Dates: 9-18 September 1999
- Location: Valletta
- Country: Malta
- Athletes participating: 30
- Nations participating: 19

Champion(s)
- (Finland) Jouko Ahola

The 1999 World's Strongest Man was the 22nd edition of World's Strongest Man and was won by Jouko Ahola from Finland. It was his second title after finishing second the previous year. Janne Virtanen also from Finland finished second, and Svend Karlsen from Norway finished third. The contest was held in Malta.

== Heats ==
=== Group 1 ===
- Events: Carry and Drag, Truck Pull, Loading, Hercules Hold, Log lift for reps, Medley

Place	Name	Nationality	Points
1.	Magnus Samuelsson	Sweden	33
2.	Jamie Barr	Scotland	27
3.	Joe Onosai	Samoa	21.5
4.	Mark Philippi	United States	21.5
5.	Grant Edwards	Australia	13
6.	Israel Garrido	Spain	10

=== Group 2 ===
- Events: Carry and Drag, Husafell Stone, Atlas Stones, Lateral Hold, Dead Lift Hold, Medley

Place	Name	Nationality	Points
1.	Jouko Ahola	Finland	32
2.	René Minkwitz	Denmark	27
3.	Levi Vaoga	New Zealand	25
4.	Pieter de Bruyn	South Africa	18
5.	Steve Brooks	England	15
6.	Bryan Neese	United States	7

=== Group 3 ===
- Events: Carry and Drag, Husafell Stone, Loading, Hercules Hold, Log lift for reps, Medley

Place	Name	Nationality	Points
1.	Janne Virtanen	Finland	31.5
2.	Svend Karlsen	Norway	22.5
3.	Glenn Ross	Northern Ireland	21
4.	Jorma Paananen	Sweden	18.5
5.	Niko Noga	United States	17
6.	Gerrit Badenhorst	South Africa	15.5

=== Group 4 ===
- Events: Carry and Drag, Truck Pull, Loading, Lateral Hold, Dead Lift Hold, Medley

Place	Name	Nationality	Points
1.	Hugo Girard	Canada	34
2.	Torfi Ólafsson	Iceland	27
3.	Ken Brown	United States	22
4.	Regin Vagadal	Faroe Islands	22
5.	Hubert Dörer	Austria	12
6.	Lee Bowers	England	9

=== Group 5 ===
- Events: Carry and Drag, Truck Pull, Atlas Stones, Hercules Hold, Dead Lift Hold, Medley

Place	Name	Nationality	Points
1.	Berend Veneberg	Netherlands	31
2.	László Fekete	Hungary	23
3.	Raimonds Bergmanis	Latvia	23
4.	Whit Baskin	United States	22
5.	Andreas Hoffman	Germany	16
6.	Bill Pittuck	England	11

=== Events of the Final ===
- Super Yoke
- Dead lift
- Atlas stones
- Boat pull
- Plane drag
- Log lift
- Medley

== Final results ==
#	Name	Nationality	Pts
1	Jouko Ahola	Finland	60
2	Janne Virtanen	Finland	53
3	Svend Karlsen	Norway	52.5
4	Hugo Girard	Canada	49.5
5	Magnus Samuelsson	Sweden	47
6	Berend Veneberg	Netherlands	41
7	Torfi Olafsson	Iceland	29.5
8	László Fekete	Hungary	23
9	Jamie Barr	Scotland	22.5
10	René Minkwitz	Denmark	1 (injured)

Events: Super Yoke, Dead lift for max, Boat Pull, Atlas Stones, Plane Pull, Giant log lift for reps, Medley

Preceded by 1998 World's Strongest Man	1999 World's Strongest Man	Succeeded by 2000 World's Strongest Man
