= Patrik Baboumian =

German strength-athlete

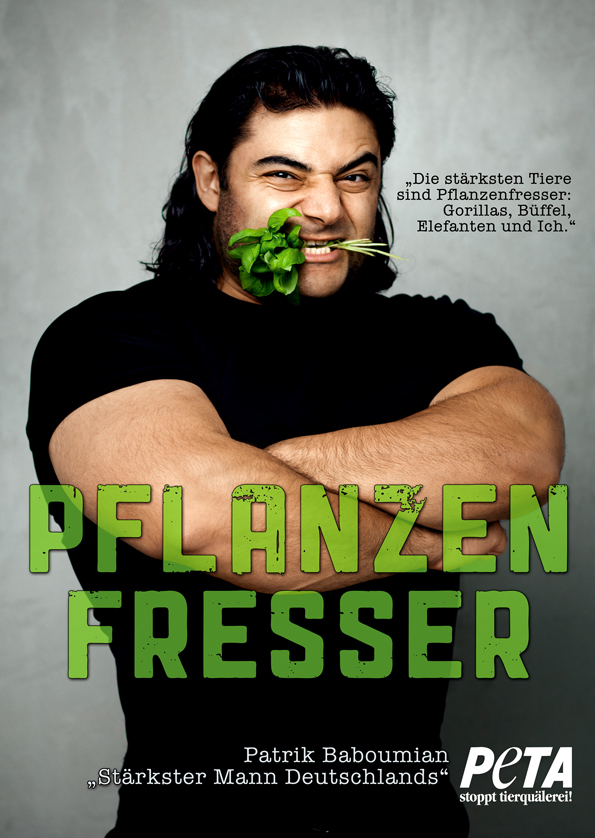
- Baboumian in 2012
- Born: 1 July 1979 (age 47); Abadan, Iran
- Occupation: Strongman
- Height: 171 cm (5 ft 7 in)

Patrik Baboumian (Armenian: Փատրիկ Բաբումեան, Persian: پاتریک بابومیان; born 1 July 1979) is an Iranian-born Armenian retired strongman in Germany and former bodybuilder. He promotes veganism.

== Early life ==
Baboumian was born on 1 July 1979 in Abadan, Iran, the son of Armenian parents. He moved to Germany at age seven.

== Career ==
Baboumian lifted 162.5 kg (358 pounds) in his second attempt in the 2009 German log lift nationals. The next year, he set a new German heavyweight log lifting record with 180 kg (396 pounds). In 2011, Baboumian competed at the log lifting world championship and placed 4th with a new German overall record of 185 kg (408 pounds). On 21 May 2011, he lifted 190 kg (420 pounds) in Finland, winning the local competition. He also won "Germany's Strongest Man" in 2011 by winning the open division at the German strongman nationals. On September 20, 2015, Baboumian beat his record by completing the yoke walk with 560 kg (1,230 pounds) in Germany.

== Personal life ==
Baboumian has been a vegetarian since 2005 and became a vegan in 2011. In November 2011, he became the new face of a campaign by the animal rights organization PETA, advocating a vegan diet. He has been featured in the 2018 Documentary The Game Changers, where one of the highlights is the record breaking Yoke-walk feat he performed during the 2015 Veg Fest.

== Accomplishments ==
- 2011 German record in beer keg lifting (13 repeats)
- 2011 Germany's Strongest Man
- 2012 European Champion in Powerlifting Class—140 kg division (GPA)
- 2012 World record beer keg lifting 150.2 kg (331 pounds)
- 2012 World record Front Hold 20 kg (1:26,14 Minutes)
- 2013 World record yoke-walk, 555.2 kg (1,224 pounds) over 10 m (33 feet) in Toronto
- 2015 Veg Fest yoke-walk, 560 kg (1,230 pounds) in 28 seconds

== See also ==
- List of vegans
- Strongman
