= Lars Rørbakken =

Norwegian strongman

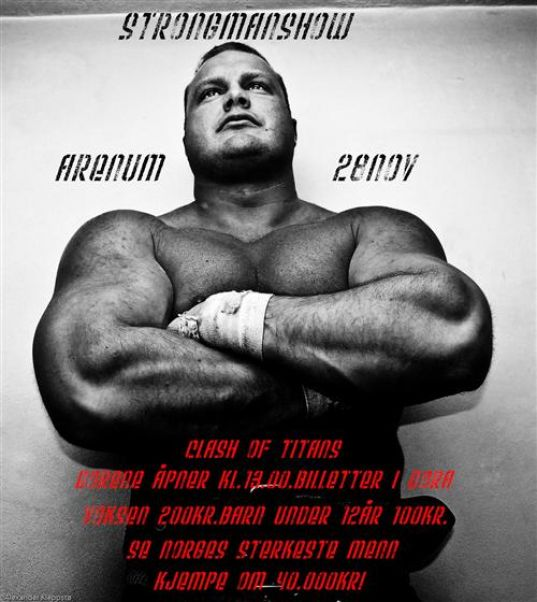
- Born: Lars Rørbakken; 17 July 1979 (age 46); Bergen, Norway
- Occupations: Strongman, Armwrestling
- Height: 6 ft 0 in (183 cm)

Competition record

Strongman

Representing Norway

Norway's Strongest Man
| 5th | 2007 | |
| 3rd | 2009 | |
| 5th | 2010 | |
| 2nd | 2011 | |

Kristiansand showlift
| 1st | 2008 | |

Fitnessmessen Lillestrøm
| 2nd | 2008 | |

Heilt Vilt Strongman
| 1st | 2008 | |

Clash of Titans
| 1st | 2008 | |
| 2nd | 2009 | |

Lars Rørbakken (born 17 July 1979) is a strongman and armwrestler from Trengereid outside Bergen, Norway. Rørbakken has competed in Norway's strongest man several times, and also has several National Championship titles. He is a 6-foot-2-inch (1.90 m) and 236-pound (107 kg), has been in the Norwegian film Hjelp, vi er russ!

Lars Rørbakken was caught for doping in 2007, and was banned for 2 years from all sports. Antidoping Norway checked Rørbakken in connection with training, and he tested positive for anabolic steroids.

== Personal records ==
- Car deadlift (side handles – from 15 inches) (for reps) – 345 kg (761 lb) x 24 reps (2012 Norway's Strongest Man) (World Record)

== Armwrestling ==
| Event | Gold | Silver | Bronze |
|---|---|---|---|
| (Norway) World Championship | | | 3 |
| (Norway) European Championship | | 1 | 1 |
| (Norway) Nordic Championship | 7 | 3 | 2 |
| (Norway) Norwegian Championship | 14 | 3 | |
| (Norway) Color Line Open | 4 | | |

=== Notable matches (since 2023) ===
| Year | Opponent | Result | Hand | Outcome | Event |
|---|---|---|---|---|---|
| 2024 | Matt Mask | Loss | Right Hand | 1-3 | East vs West 14 |
| 2024 | Michael Todd | Loss | Right Hand | 0-6 | KOTT 11 |
| 2023 | Valera Chubotaru | Won | Right Hand | 4-3 | KOTT 9 |
| 2023 | Maateiwarangi Heta-Morris | Won | Right Hand | 5-1 | KOTT 8 |
