= Mika Törrö =

Finnish strongman

Personal information
- Nationality: Finnish
- Born: 11 May 1979 (age 47)
- Occupation: Strongman
- Height: 6 ft 8.5 in (2.04 m)
- Weight: 180–185 kg (397–408 lb)
Medal record
Strongman
Representing Finland
World's Strongest Man
Qualified	2022 World's Strongest Man
World's Strongest Viking
3rd	2019 World's Strongest Viking
3rd	2020 World's Strongest Viking
Strongman Champions League
3rd	2019 SCL World Truck Pull Championships
3rd	2019 SCL Holland
3rd	2021 SCL World Truck Pull Championships
1st	2021 Imatra Strongman Showdown
3rd	2021 SCL World Finals
2nd	2022 SCL Romania
2nd	2023 SCL World Record Breakers
2nd	2024 SCL World Record Breakers
Finland's Strongest Man
1st	2018
1st	2019
1st	2020
1st	2021
1st	2022
3rd	2023
3rd	2024
1st	2025

Mika Törrö (born 11 May 1979) is a Finnish Strongman from Joensuu and a 6 x times Finland's Strongest Man champion.

Törrö had a difficult upbringing early in his life: He had ADHD, BPD, and was imprisoned for over a decade. Through strength training he managed to change his ways and eventually got an opportunity to join Strongman Champions League. Ensuing years, he won three silver medals and six bronze medals and became a regular contestant in the international circuit. Additionally, Törrö secured consecutive bronze medals in World's Strongest Viking competition in 2019 and 2020 and won 2021 Imatra Strongman Showdown.

In his first and only appearance at World's Strongest Man competition in 2022 held in Sacramento, California, he battled out at the third qualifier group in which Oleksii Novikov and Trey Mitchell managed to get into the finals.

Törrö's autobiography Härkä – vangista vahvimmaksi was published in 2021.

== Personal records ==
- Raw Deadlift (with straps) – 350 kg (772 lb) (2019 SCL Germany)
- Log press – 150 kg (331 lb) (2019 SCL FIBO)
- Atlas Stones – 120–200 kg (265–441 lb) (5 stones) in 32.53 seconds (2022 Finland's Strongest Man)
- Húsafell Stone carry (around the pen) – 186 kg (410 lb) for 49.60 metres (162 ft 9 in) (around 1.4 revolutions) (2022 Magnús Ver Magnússon Classic)
- Hercules hold (machine setup) – 136 kg (300 lb) for 162.23 seconds (2022 SCL World Record Breakers)
- Viking Boat pull (with the sails) – 3,000 kg (6,614 lb) harness only/ no rope for 20m 'in ice terrain' in 16.12 seconds (2019 World's Strongest Viking) (World Record)
- Truck pull – 24,000 kg (52,911 lb) for 6m 'in ice terrain' in 53.59 seconds (2024 SCL Iceman) (World Record)
