= 2000 World's Strongest Man =

Strongman competition in 2000

Competition information
- Dates: 1-11 August 2000
- Venue: Sun City
- Country: South Africa
- Athletes participating: 30
- Nations participating: 20

Champion(s)
- (Finland) Janne Virtanen

The 2000 World's Strongest Man was the 23rd edition of World's Strongest Man and was won by Janne Virtanen from Finland. It was his first title after finishing second the previous year. Svend Karlsen from Norway finished second after finishing third the previous year, and 1998 winner Magnus Samuelsson from Sweden finished third. The contest was held in Sun City, South Africa.

== Qualifying heats ==
Qualifying heats in World's Strongest Man involve a series of six events. The field is divided into groups of six competitors with the top two in each of the groups reaching the ten man final. A win in an event gives a competitor 6 points, second place gets 5, and so on (4,3,2,1).

=== Heat 1 ===
- Events: Super Yoke, Africa Stone, Power Stairs, Boulder Holder (Connan Circle), Axle Press, Atlas Stones

#	Name	Nationality	Pts
1	Hugo Girard	Canada	28
2	Rob Dixon	United Kingdom	27
3	Derek Boyer	Fiji	25.5
4	Whit Baskin	United States	23
5	Pieter de Bruyn	South Africa	16.5
6	Jose Hervas	Spain	2 (injury)

=== Heat 2 ===
- Events: Tyre Flip, Africa Stone, Car Lift (Car Deadlift Hold), Boulder Holder (Connan Circle), Fingal's Fingers, Atlas Stones

#	Name	Nationality	Pts
1	Magnus Samuelsson	Sweden	29
2	Regin Vagadal	Faroe Islands	23
3	Glenn Ross	United Kingdom	23
4	Johnny Perry	United States	18
5	Torfi Olafsson	Iceland	18
6	René Minkwitz	Denmark	14

=== Heat 3 ===
- Events: Tyre Flip, Africa Stone, Power Stairs, Boulder Holder (Connan Circle), Axle Press, Atlas Stones

#	Name	Nationality	Pts
1	Janne Virtanen	Finland	33
2	Gerrit Badenhorst	South Africa	23.5
3	Brian Schoonveld	United States	19.5
4	Torbjörn Samuelsson	Sweden	19
5	Bernd Kerschbaumer	Austria	18
6	Brian Bell	United Kingdom	13

=== Heat 4 ===
- Events: Super Yoke, Africa Stone, Car Lift (Car Deadlift Hold), Boulder Holder (Connan Circle), Fingal's Fingers, Atlas Stones

#	Name	Nationality	Pts
1	Svend Karlsen	Norway	32
2	Martin Muhr	Germany	30
3	Levi Vaoga	New Zealand	20
4	Mark Philippi	United States	18 (injury)
5	Graham Mullins	United Kingdom	15
6	Jean-Marc Tocaven	France	3 (injury)

=== Heat 5 ===
- Events: Tyre Flip, Africa Stone, Power Stairs, Boulder Holder (Connan Circle), Axle Press, Atlas Stones

#	Name	Nationality	Pts
1	Mariusz Pudzianowski	Poland	31
2	Phil Pfister	United States	27
3	Zydrunas Savickas	Lithuania	27
4	Peter Baltus	Netherlands	22.5
5	Adrian Rollinson	United Kingdom	12.5
6	László Fekete	Hungary	1 (injury)

== Final results ==
#	Name	Nationality	Pts
1	Janne Virtanen	Finland	59
2	Svend Karlsen	Norway	54
3	Magnus Samuelsson	Sweden	53
4	Mariusz Pudzianowski	Poland	49
5	Phil Pfister	United States	42
6	Martin Muhr	Germany	40
7	Gerrit Badenhorst	South Africa	34
8	Regin Vagadal	Faroe Islands	26
9	Hugo Girard	Canada	8 (Injured)
10	Rob Dixon	Great Britain	5 (Injured)

Position	Name	Nationality	Event 1 Super Yoke	Event 2 Power Stairs	Event 3 Car Lift	Event 4 Farmer's Walk	Event 5 Truck Pull	Event 6 Fingal's Fingers	Event 7 Atlas Stones
1 (59pts)	Janne Virtanen	Finland	3 (19.8s)	3 (33.5s)	4 (43.1s)	1 (25.0s)	1 (49.0s)	4 (4 in 43.0s)	2 (5 in 34.5s)
2 (54pts)	Svend Karlsen	Norway	1 (13.7s)	5 (35.8s)	6 (37.7s)	4 (26.9s)	5 (54.7s)	1 (5 in 42.6s)	1 (5 in 30.7s)
3 (53pts)	Magnus Samuelsson	Sweden	2 (17.8s)	7 (38.0s)	2 (70.0s)	3 (26.3s)	4 (54.2s)	3 (5 in 54.1s)	3 (5 in 37.7s)
4 (49pts)	Mariusz Pudzianowski	Poland	7 (26.8s)	2 (28.7s)	1 (72.2s)	5 (28.3s)	3 (54.0s)	6 (2 in 26.9s)	4 (5 in 50.2s)
5 (42pts)	Phil Pfister	United States	10 (40.7s)	6 (37.2s)	7 (21.6s)	2 (25.6s)	2 (51.4s)	2 (5 in 43.8s)	6 (4 in 35.8s)
6 (40pts)	Martin Muhr	Germany	9 (32.9s)	1 (27.9s)	3 (49.7s)	6 (30.9s)	8 (66.1s)	5 (3 in 25.2s)	5 (5 in 54.2s)
7 (34pts)	Gerrit Badenhorst	South Africa	6 (26.5s)	4 (34.7s)	5 (40.7s)	7 (39.0s)	6 (58.4s)	7 (2 in 22.7s)	8 (3 in 46.0s)
8 (26pts)	Regin Vagadal	Faroe Islands	5 (24.3s)	8 (56.3s)	8 (8.2s)	8 (16.3 m)	7 (64.9s)	8 (2 in 23.8s)	7 (4 in 59.4s)
9 (8pts)	Hugo Girard	Canada	4 (21.5s)	10 (2 stairs)	(Injured)	(Injured)	(Injured)	(Injured)	(Injured)
10 (5pts)	Rob Dixon	United Kingdom	8 (27.3s)	9 (21 stairs)	(Injured)	(Injured)	(Injured)	(Injured)	(Injured)

Preceded by 1999 World's Strongest Man	2000 World's Strongest Man	Succeeded by 2001 World's Strongest Man
