= Heinz Ollesch =

Personal information
- Born: November 27, 1966 (age 59) Rosenheim, Bavaria, Germany
- Occupation: Strongman
- Height: 6 ft 3 in (1.91 m)
Medal record
Strongman
Representing Germany
World's Strongest Man
Qualified	1994 World's Strongest Man
4th	1995 World's Strongest Man
Qualified	1996 World's Strongest Man
6th	1997 World's Strongest Man
Qualified	1998 World's Strongest Man
Qualified	2001 World's Strongest Man
Qualified	2002 World's Strongest Man
Qualified	2003 World's Strongest Man
Strongest Man on Earth
1st	1995 (tie with Magnus Ver Magnusson)
World Strongman Challenge
2nd	2000 World Strongman Challenge
2nd	1997 World Strongman Challenge
3rd	1995 World Strongman Challenge
Europe's Strongest Man
2nd	1996
Germany's Strongest Man
1st	1994
1st	1995
1st	1996
1st	1997
1st	1998
1st	1999
1st	2000
1st	2001
1st	2002
1st	2003
1st	2004
1st	2006

Heinz Ollesch (born November 27, 1966) is a strongman from Germany. He won Germany's Strongest Man 12 times, and participated in the World's Strongest Man finals in 1995 and 1997.

== Biography ==
Ollesch was born in Rosenheim, Bavaria and grew up in Lehen, Großkarolinenfeld, starting with strength training 1984 and doing international Strongman contests since 1994. In the same year he was invited to the World's Strongest Man for the first time but did not make it past the qualifying heats. In 1994 he also became Germany's Strongest Man for the first time, a feat he would repeat to 2004. A year later he was invited again and made it to the final where he finished fourth, his best result at the World's Strongest Man. He would participate for several more years in the tournament but only managed to reach the final again in 1996 where he would finish sixth. The same year he finished second in Europe's Strongest Man. In 2006 he was Germany's Strongest Man for the last time. He managed a podium finish on three occasions at the World Strongman Challenge, third in 1995 and second in 1997 and 2000.

Ollesch played a supporting role in the Thai movie Tom-Yum-Goong.

== Honours ==
- 12 times Germany’s Strongest Man (1994–2004 and 2006)
- 4th place World's Strongest Man (1995)
- 6th place World's Strongest Man (1997)

== Personal records ==
- Wheelbarrow carry (with straps) – 450 kg (992 lb) (15m course) in 14.38 seconds (1995 Strongest Man on Earth) (World Record)
- Keg toss – 20 kg (44 lb) over 5.18 metres (17 ft 0 in) (2000 Beauty and the Beast)
- Keg toss – 25 kg (55 lb) over 4.80 metres (15 ft 9 in) (1995 Manfred Hoeberl Classic)
