= Juha-Matti Räsänen =

Finnish strength athlete

Personal information
- Born: May 19, 1974 (age 52) Kuopio, Finland
- Occupations: Strongman, Carpenter
- Height: 198 cm (6 ft 6 in)
Medal record
Strongman
Representing Finland
World's Strongest Man
9th	2001 World's Strongest Man
6th	2002 World's Strongest Man
IFSA Strongman World Open
10th	2005
IFSA Nordic Championships
3rd	2005
Finland's Strongest Man
3rd	1999
3rd	2000
2nd	2001
1st	2002
1st	2003
2nd	2004
2nd	2006

Juha-Matti Räsänen (born May 19, 1974) is a strongman competitor from Kuopio, Finland. Juha began training for strongman in 1995, began competing as an amateur in 1996 and turned professional in 2000. Juha competed in the 2001 and 2002 World's Strongest Man contests, finishing 9th and 6th respectively. Juha is a 2-time winner of Finland's Strongest Man in 2002 & 2003, and is a 3 time runner-up. Juha holds the Guinness World Record for throwing a 60 kg man 5.40 meters (17 ft 8in) in Spain in July 2006. He was primarily known for his back strength, claiming a deadlift of 385 kg (849 lbs), and easily won that event in his heat of the 2001 World's Strongest Men competition.
