= Bill Lyndon =

Australian former strongman competitor (born 1964)

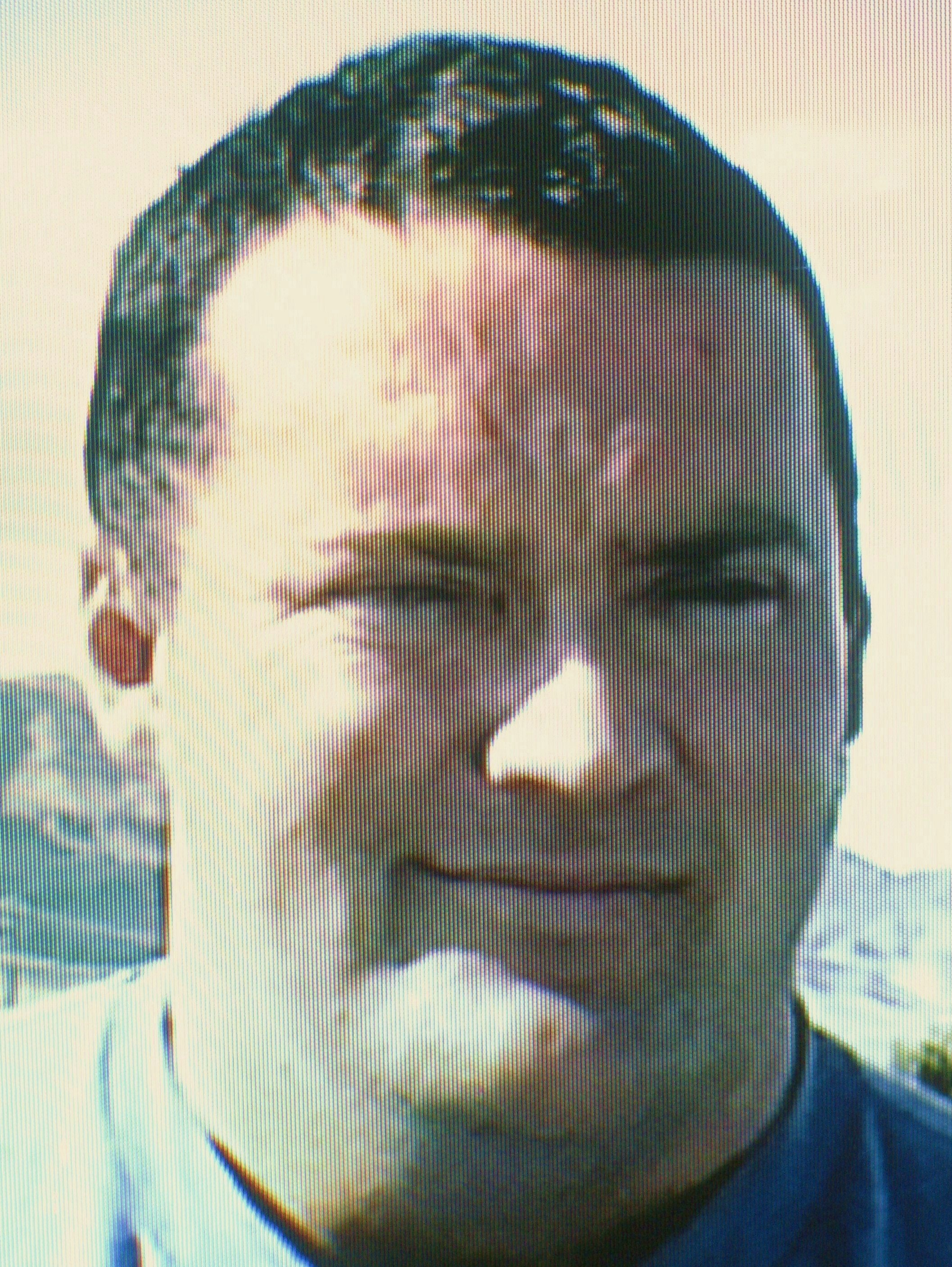
- Bill in 1998

Personal information
- Born: 30 January 1964 (age 62) Melbourne, Australia
- Occupations: Strongman, Powerlifting
- Height: 6 ft 3 in (1.91 m)
Medal record
Strongman
Representing Australia
World's Strongest Man
Qualified	1994 World's Strongest Man
Qualified	1996 World's Strongest Man
Qualified	1997 World's Strongest Man
Qualified	1998 World's Strongest Man
World Muscle Power Classic
4th	1996
Australia's Strongest Man
1st	1993
1st	1994
1st	1996
1st	1997
1st	1998

Bill Lyndon (born 30 January 1964) is an Australian former strongman competitor. Lyndon is a 5-time winner of Australia's Strongest Man, and a 4-time entrant to the World's Strongest Man competition.

== Early years ==
Bill Lyndon was born in Melbourne, Australia. He was one of seven children having five sisters and a brother. He was educated at high school in Melbourne and went on to business college, afterwards becoming a structural engineer. A keen sportsman, he played a variety of sports including Australian Rules Football, American football, Rugby league, cycling and from the age of 23, powerlifting. His rugby league led him to spend two seasons in Perth and as a powerlifter he won four national powerlifting titles.

== Strongman career ==
In terms of strongman competition his international career began after he was invited to Scotland for the 1993 World Muscle Power Classic. Some of Bill's competitors in this contest included: Gary Taylor, Manfred Hoeberl, Wayne Price, Magnus Ver Magnusson (referred to as "Maggie" by Lyndon) and Forbes Cowan. Although Lyndon did not feature among the contenders he found the experience of being around such renowned strongmen a rewarding one. The 1993 World's Strongest Man competition was held in Orange, France and Lyndon was considered for the last spot but Harold "Iron Bear" Collins was chosen that year. The following year, another triumph in Australia's Strongest Man secured Lyndon a spot at the 1994 World's Strongest Man contest, but failed to make the finals. Nathan Jones won the Australian title in 1995 and got the place at 1995 World's Strongest Man contest, where his arm was broken in an armwrestling match in the heats with 1998 World's Strongest Man champion Magnus Samuelsson. Lyndon went on to compete at the 1996 World's Strongest Man, 1997 World's Strongest Man and 1998 World's Strongest Man qualifying heats, but he was never able to qualify for the finals. In 1999, when the IFSA was still running WSM, Manfred Hoeberl set up a rival AFSA organization. Lyndon joined this and as such was banned by IFSA. Lyndon's decision was swayed by the fact that he was not getting enough competitions via IFSA. In 1998 he had only competed in Hungary and Morocco, whereas the AFSA offered five competitions in the first year.

== Retirement ==
In the late 1990s Bill looked towards his own Australian based sports promotion company. He formed 'Spartan Warriors Australia' and began advertising extensively in magazines and at public events, He later started a website called Aussie Power designed to cover and feature many diverse athletes from strongman, powerlifters, olympic lifters, throwers covering Australia and the Asia Pacific region.

== Personal Records ==
- Squat – 265 kg (584 lb)
- Bench press – 212 kg (467 lb)
- Deadlift – 310 kg (683 lb)
- Military press – 145 kg (320 lb)
- Keg toss – 20 kg (44 lb) over 5.00 metres (16 ft 5 in) (1997 European Open)

Preceded by none Nathan Jones	Australia's Strongest Man; 1993-1994; 1996-1998	Succeeded by Nathan Jones; Grant Edwards
