= World Strength Games =

Strongman competition

Tournament information
- Location: St. George, Utah, United States
- Established: 2017; 9 years ago
- Format: World record competition with regional qualifiers
- Website: worldstrength.games

Most recent tournament
- 2025 World Strength Games

World Strength Games (abbreviated 'WSG') is an annual international strongman competition and fitness expo. Established in 2017, the event combines world record attempts in strength disciplines with regional qualifying competitions across North America, including events such as the Utah Strength Games and Salt Lake Strongest Man. In 2025, it was held during Memorial Day weekend at the Dixie Convention Center in St. George, Utah.

== Format and regional qualifying system ==
The competition was founded in 2017 with 11 athletes. It uses a global qualifying network, including: Utah Strength Games (Salt Lake City), Kentucky World Strength Games Qualifier (Stearns, KY) and Fitcon Utah's Strongest Man (Salt Palace Convention Center). The top three finishers in each weight class at qualifiers earn invitations to the main event. Depending on event type, athletes may have one or two attempts in weight-class-based competitions with each other. Events mainly have featured strongman implements such as stone carry, super yoke, farmer's carry, and vehicle pull.

=== Record breaking performances ===
In 2023 World Strength Games held at Orlando, Florida, Dimitar Savatinov set the American deadlift record of 1,031 lb (467.7 kg). In 2024 edition, Corey Anderson set the 'Magnus Stone' world record, carrying the 402 lb (182.3 kg) near cuboid shaped basalt a distance of 11.91 metres (39 ft 1 in). The stone named after Magnús Ver Magnússon was inspired by the legendary Húsafell Stone of Iceland. As of 2025, World Strength Games has documented 121 various event records which extends to USA Wrestling tournaments, Ninja Warrior courses, and CrossFit challenges.

== 2025 competition ==
2025 World Strength Games was held from 22 to 24 May at the Dixie Convention Center, adopting a three-day format. On 22 May were the weigh-ins and athlete meet-and-greet followed by the competition during 23 to 24 May. The competition featured five events: log lift, farmer's carry, natural stone carry, super yoke and deadlift. Magnús Ver Magnússon and Travis Ortmayer judged the competition.

Results were tracked and placed on www.strengthresults.com for all weight classes.
