= Svend Karlsen =

Norwegian strongman (born 1967)

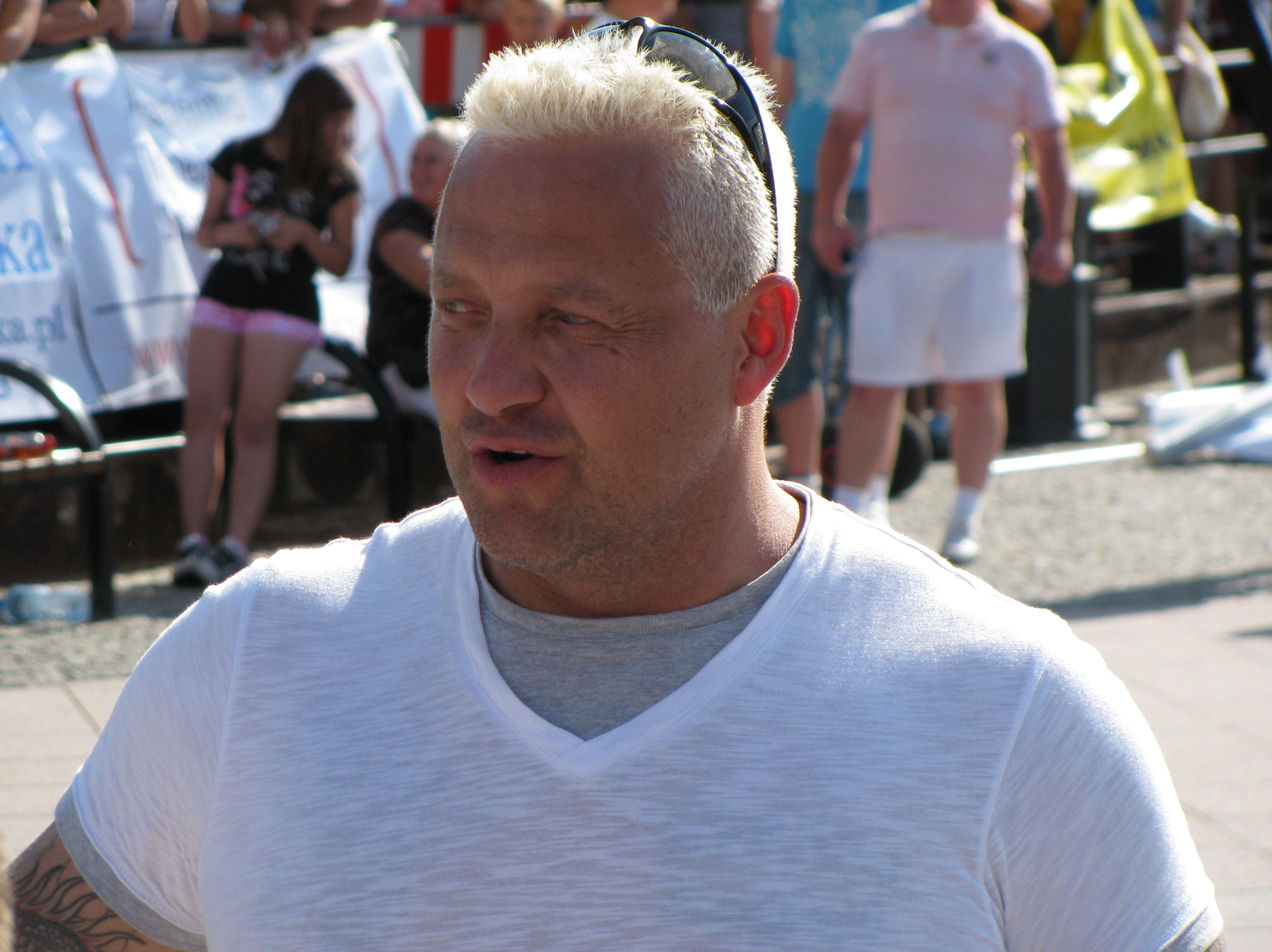

Personal information
- Nickname: "The Viking"
- Born: Svend Ødegård Karlsen; 6 October 1967 (age 59) Drammen, Norway
- Occupations: Strongman, Powerlifter, Bodybuilder
- Height: 188 cm (6 ft 2 in)
- Spouse: Eun Lene Ekrem Karlsen 2002-2009 (her death)

Sport
- Retired: 2006
Medal record
Strongman
Representing Norway
World's Strongest Man
Qualified	1996 World's Strongest Man
8th	1997 World's Strongest Man
3rd	1999 World's Strongest Man
2nd	2000 World's Strongest Man
1st	2001 World's Strongest Man
5th	2002 World's Strongest Man
9th	2003 World's Strongest Man
5th	2004 World's Strongest Man
Arnold Strongman Classic
2nd	2002 Arnold Strongman Classic
2nd	2003 Arnold Strongman Classic
2nd	2004 Arnold Strongman Classic
6th	2005 Arnold Strongman Classic
World Muscle Power Championships
2nd	2001 World Muscle Power Classic
1st	2002 World Muscle Power Classic
Europe's Strongest Man
3rd	1998 Europe's Strongest Man
1st	2001 Europe's Strongest Man
3rd	2002 Europe's Strongest Man
6th	2003 Europe's Strongest Man
IFSA Strongman World Championships
Qualified	2005 IFSA World Championships
IFSA World Open
2nd	2005 IFSA World Open
IFSA Nordic Championships
1st	2005 IFSA Nordic Championships
Strongman Super Series
3rd	2001 Holland Grand Prix
2nd	2001 Czech Grand Prix
3rd	2001 Sweden Grand Prix
3rd	2001 Overall
2nd	2002 Sweden Grand Prix
5th	2002 Hawaii Grand Prix
2nd	2002 Overall
9th	2003 Hawaii Grand Prix
4th	2003 Holland Grand Prix
3rd	2003 Canada Grand Prix
4th	2003 Finland Grand Prix
2nd	2004 Arnold Strongman Classic
4th	2003/04 Overall
5th	2004 Moscow Grand Prix
3rd	2004 Sweden Grand Prix
World Strongman Challenge
3rd	1997 World Strongman Challenge
3rd	2000 World Strongman Challenge
3rd	2001 World Strongman Challenge
Norway's Strongest Man
1st	2003
1st	2005
1st	2006

Svend Karlsen
Medal record
Representing Norway
Powerlifting
Representing Norway
IPF Junior World Championships
3rd	1989	125 kg
EPF European Powerlifting Championships
4th	1989	110kg
EPF Junior European Championships
3rd	1986	125 kg
3rd	1989	125 kg

Svend Karlsen
Medal record

Men's bodybuilding

Representing the Norway

World Games
Silver medal – second place	1993 The Hague	+90 kg

Svend Karlsen (born 6 October 1967) is a Norwegian former strongman, powerlifter and bodybuilder. The winner of the 2001 World's Strongest Man and three times Norway's Strongest Man, he was well known for shouting his catch phrase "Viking Power!" while competing.

Notably, Karlsen is the winner of the World's Strongest Man, the Europe's Strongest Man, the World Muscle Power Classic, and 3 times runner up at the Arnold Strongman Classic.

== Early life ==
Born in Drammen, Karlsen was already a child with an unusual athleticism, and his mother recorded him in photos posing to show muscles at the age of three. After seeing a photo of Arnold Schwarzenegger, Karlsen decided to train for muscles and strength at age 13, and soon spent six to eight hours of his day in the gym, training, making friends and learning from the more experienced.

== Powerlifting and bodybuilding ==
Once he started showing remarkable strength gains, Karlsen started out as a powerlifter in 1986, winning a number of titles and setting 30 Norwegian records, 3 European records, and 1 world record by 1989.

Soon after, Karlsen began pursuing a career in bodybuilding. He traveled on the road doing posing exhibitions with some bodybuilding friends to help pay the bills. Karlsen won the Mr. Norway title, and took second place at the World Games. This victory earned him his IFBB pro card in 1993 and paved the way for him to compete as a professional. Karlsen moved to California to focus on his bodybuilding career, and his first pro show was the IFBB Night of Champions. Karlsen suffered a severe muscle tear that forced him to retire from bodybuilding, and in 1996 he quickly moved on to strongman competitions.

== Strongman career ==
Karlsen competed in one of the 1996 World's Strongest Man qualifying heats and narrowly missed qualifying for the finals. In the 1997 World's Strongest Man contest, Karlsen qualified for his first of 7 consecutive finals from 1997, 1999-2004 (did not compete in 1998). After finishing second in the Húsafell Stone carry, Karlsen was leading the finals on points, but during the warm-up for the squat event, he tore his hamstring and had to withdraw from the rest of the contest. He won his first international podium at 1997 World Strongman Challenge.

In 1998 he emerged third at Atlantic Giant and IFSA Helsinki Grand Prix.

Karlsen returned to 1999 World's Strongest Man in Valletta, Malta, finishing in third place behind Jouko Ahola and Janne Virtanen. He managed to win the Super Yoke and final medley and emerged second at deadlift. The following year he promoted himself to second place in 2000 World's Strongest Man held in Sun City, South Africa behind Janne Virtanen. He won Super Yoke, Fingal's Fingers and Atlas Stones and was consistent across all the events. Karlsen finally became victorious at the 2001 World's Strongest Man competition in Victoria Falls, Zambia defeating his good friend Magnus Samuelsson and Janne Virtanen, becoming the thirteenth man to win the title. He won the squat and came second in carry & flip, vertical lift and came third in the Conan's Wheel before iconically celebrating by jumping into a swimming pool.

Some of Karlsen's other notable strongman titles include Europe's Strongest Man 2001, 3 time runner-up at the Arnold Strongman Classic 2002–04, World Muscle Power Championships 2001 winner, and 3 time Norway's Strongest Man in 2003, 2005 and 2006. Karlsen was the second athlete inducted into the World's Strongest Man Hall of Fame in 2010 as voted by the fans.

He has a larger than life personality and, similar to his Nordic strongman predecessor Jón Páll Sigmarsson, is known for his catchphrase "Viking Power". Karlsen was featured in the 2003 documentary 'The World's Strongest Arms', together with his good friend and fellow World's Strongest Man champion Magnus Samuelsson where they performed world class feats of strength.

Among his best lifts in his early years were a 400 kg squat, 260 kg bench press and a 412.5 kg deadlift. In an interview in 1997, he claimed his most notable feat of strength was deadlifting 400 kg for 3 repetitions.

== Personal records ==
=== In competitions ===
- Deadlift – 375 kg (827 lb) (1999 World's Strongest Man)
- Squat (tyres on machine) – 318 kg (701 lb) x 14 reps (2002 World's Strongest Man)
- X-Treme Squat – 551 kg (1,215 lb) (2003 X-Treme Strongman Championships) (World Record)
- Log Press – 185 kg (408 lb) (2002 Sweden Grand Prix)
- Leviathan Press (incline log press) – 120 kg (265 lb) x 14 reps (2002 IFSA Finland Grand Prix) (Joint-World Record)
- Axle Press – 170 kg (375 lb) (2002 Sweden Grand Prix)
- Axle Press (for reps) – 120 kg (265 lb) x 15 reps (2000 Beauty and the Beast Strongman Challenge) (Joint-World Record)
- Flintstone Press – 200 kg (441 lb) (1996 World's Strongest Man - Group 4)
- Atlas Stones – 5 stones weighing 95–160 kg (209–353 lb) on distant platforms (no tacky) in 30.70 seconds (2000 World's Strongest Man) (World Record)
- Atlas Stones – 120–180 kg (265–397 lb) (5 stones) in 18.74 seconds (2005 IFSA Nordic Championships)
- Húsafell Stone – 163 kg (359 lb) (87.5% of the original) for 86.66 metres (1997 World's Strongest Man)
- Keg Toss – 20 kg (44 lb) over 5.34 metres (17 ft 6 in) (2000 Beauty and the Beast)
- Front hold – 30 kg (66 lb) for 69.66 seconds (2000 IFSA Grand Prix Ireland)
- Crucifix hold – 12.5 kg (28 lb) for 63.26 seconds (2001 Europe's Strongest Man)
- Farmer's walk – 138 kg (304 lb) in each hand (70 meter course) in 22.87 seconds (2003 Finland Grand Prix)
- Wheelbarrow carry – 330 kg (728 lb) for 30 metres in 19.72 s (2003 Finland Grand Prix)
- Conan's wheel (Basque circle) – 375 kg (827 lb) 480° rotation (2002 World Muscle Power Classic) (World Record)
- Tyre flip – 520 kg (1,146 lb) x 5 flips in 24.20 seconds (2004 Strongman Super Series Sweden Grand Prix) (World Record)
- Tyre flip – 450 kg (992 lb) x 8 flips in 26.84 seconds (2005 Norway's Strongest Man) (World Record)

=== In training ===
- Deadlift – 412.5 kg (909 lb) (self claim)
- Deadlift (for reps) – 400 kg (882 lb) x 3 reps (self claim)
- Squat – 400 kg (882 lb) (self claim)
- Bench Press – 260 kg (573 lb) (self claim)

== Retirement ==
Karlsen retired from competition in 2006, and began serving as presenter and producer of the Norwegian version of the World's Strongest Man contest and the qualifying tour Giants Live.

== After retirement ==
Karlsen is the event organizer for the Norway's Strongest Man competition, introducing events and commentating. Karlsen was a co-commentator for the final event at the 2010 Arnold Strongman Classic. Karlsen also ran the Viking Power Challenge event in Norway, which was a part of the Super Series and later Giants Live tour for qualification into the World's Strongest Man competition.

== Other competitions ==
- Strongest Man in the North 1996 - 5
- World Series Strongman Challenge 1997 - 3
- European Hercules 1997 - 4
- Helsinki Grand Prix 1998 - 2
- Atlantic Giant 1998 - 3
- Helsinki Grand Prix 2000 - 3
- Ireland Grand Prix 2000 - 3
- Beauty & The Beast 2000 - 2
- Prague Grand Prix 2000 - 2
- Romania Grand Prix 2000 - 4
- China Grand Prix 2000 - 4
- Northeast Strongman Showdown 2001 - 1
- Polish Grand Prix 2001 - 3
- Europe's Strongest Man 2001 - 1
- Dutch Grand Prix 2001 - 3
- Beauty & The Beast 2001 - 3
- World Muscle Power 2001 - 2
- Prague Grand Prix 2001 - 2
- World Record Breakers 2001 - 1
- X-treme Strongman Challenge 2001 - 1
- Stockholm Grand Prix 2001 - 3
- Northeast Strongman Showdown 2002 - 2
- Arnold Classic strongman Contest 2002 - 2
- Vantaa Challenge 2002 - 2
- Atlantic Giants 2002 - 1
- Clash of Titans 2002 - 1
- Clash of the Celtic giants 2002 - 2
- Europe Strongest Man 2002 - 3
- China Grand Prix 2002 - 1
- Sweden Grand Prix Super Series 2002 - 2
- Team World vs. Poland 2002 - 1
- Super Series Final 2002 - 2
- Hawaii Grand Prix Super Series 2003 - 9
- Arnold Classic Strongman contest 2003 - 2
- Helsinki Grand Prix 2003 - 6
- World Muscle & Power 2003 - 6
- Holland Grand Prix Super Series 2003 - 5
- Europe Strongest Man 2003 - 6
- Canada Grand Prix Super Series 2003 - 3
- World Team Championship 2003 - 5
- Finland Grand Prix Super Series 2003 - 4
- World Record Breaker 2003 - 5
- Norway Strongest Man 2003 - 1
- MHP X-TREME STRONGMAN Championship 2003 - 2
- Norway Strongest Man 2006 - 1
