= Florian Trimpl =

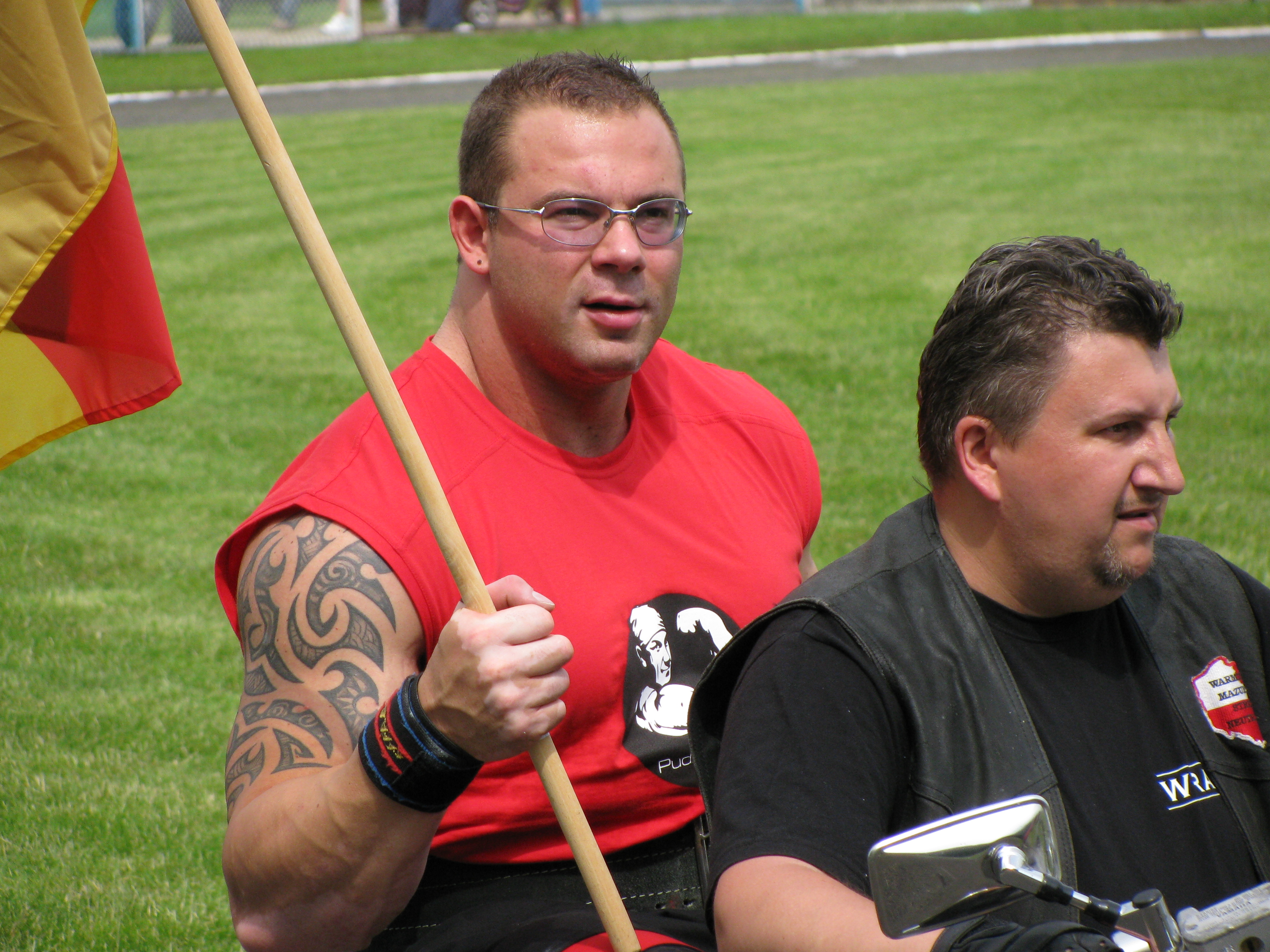
- Born: Florian Trimpl; 9 July 1979 (age 47); Germany
- Occupation: Strongman
- Height: 6 ft 3 in (1.91 m)
- Title: Germany's Strongest Man 2009

Competition record

Strongman

Representing Germany

World's Strongest Man
Qualified	2007 World's Strongest Man
Qualified	2008 World's Strongest Man
Qualified	2009 World's Strongest Man

Germany's Strongest Man
2nd	2006
2nd	2007
1st	2009

Florian Trimpl (born 9 July 1979) is a German strongman competitor and entrant to the World's Strongest Man competition on multiple occasions.

== Biography ==
Florian Trimpl began competing in strongman tournaments in 2004 at the age of 24. Trimpl rose to international attention with podium finishes in Germany's Strongest Man, culminating in winning that title in 2009. He did not affiliate to the IFSA but instead participated in the World Strongman Cup tours from 2005 onwards. This international exposure led to a 2007 invitation to the prestigious World's Strongest Man. His win in the qualifying heats of that tournament in the Hercules Hold event, in a group containing Mark Felix who has a claim to having the strongest grip in the world, is the achievement he has stated he is most proud of.' He went on to participate in two more World's Strongest Man finals in 2008 and 2009 which were the last competitions he participated in.

== Strongman competition record ==
- 2005
  - 10. – World Strongman Cup 2005: Nuremberg
- 2006
  - 2. – Germany's Strongest Man
  - 9. – World Strongman Cup 2006: Wiedeń
  - 10. – World Strongman Cup 2006: Podolsk
- 2007
  - 11. – World Strongman Cup 2007: Ryga
  - 5. – World Strongman Cup 2007: Moskwa
  - 11. – World Strongman Cup 2007: Dartford
  - 2. – Germany's Strongest Man
- 2008
- competitor World strongest man Malta
  - 4. – Germany's Strongest Man
  - 9. – WSM Super Series 2008: Lysekil
- 2009
  - 1. – Germany's Strongest Man
  - 9. – Europe's Strongest Man
