= International Federation of Strength Athletes =

International governing body for strongman competition

- Type: Sports federation
- Headquarters: Glasgow, Scotland
- Official language: English
- Managing Director: Christian Fennell

The International Federation of Strength Athletes (IFSA or IFSA Strongman) was an international governing body for strongman competition. IFSA operated from 1995 to 2007 and was based in Glasgow, Scotland.

== History ==
=== Origins ===
In 1995, David Webster, a Scotsman who later received an OBE for his services to sport and head coordinator of the World's Strongest Man from its inception, and his colleague Dr Douglas Edmunds, seven-times Scottish shot and discus champion and twice world caber champion, along with representatives from the competitors in strength athletics including Jamie Reeves, Ilkka Kinnunen and Marcel Mostert formed a governing body called the International Federation of Strength Athletes ("IFSA"). IFSA ran its own grand prix events from 1995 to 2001 in cooperation with WSM. IFSA began co-producing the Strongman Super Series events from 2001 to 2004, still in cooperation with WSM. IFSA entered an agreement with World Class Events (WCE), headed by Ulf Bengtsson, to run the Strongman Super Series. The Strongman Super Series was designed to award the annual Strongman World Championship title, but also acted as a qualifying vehicle for the World's Strongest Man contest.

=== Split with WSM ===
For almost a decade IFSA and WSM worked in full cooperation, but this changed at the end of the 2004 season when IFSA returned to organizing its own grand prix events and World Strongman Championships from 2005 to 2007. The InvestGroup Ventures' sports rights management arm, InvestGroup Sports Management, invested heavily into IFSA and this led to the creation of IFSA Strongman. The strategy was to acquire most of the international assets and properties relating to the strongman sport. In essence this was a new organization with some, such as Magnus Samuelsson describing it as "a new company...with the same name as our old federation". The attempt at dominance was not well received by TWI/WSM and disagreement ensued leading to a split in the sport. When IFSA and WSM split in 2004, the Strongman Super Series sided with TWI/WSM forming a rival federation to the IFSA. With the WSM being a TWI owned event, IFSA Holdings announced its own World Strongman Championships for 2005, to be held in Quebec, and thus from that point had no involvement in the WSM contest. From this point, IFSA continued to organize the annual IFSA World Strongman Championships and a series of Grand Prix events throughout the year. Between 2005 and 2007 IFSA had their own version of other major events such as a rival IFSA version of Europe's Strongest Man, known as Europe's Strongest Man (IFSA).

Thus, the world of strength athletics became fragmented, with a number of individuals being able to lay claim to be the strongest in the world by virtue of having won mutually exclusive events. Athletes affiliated to IFSA Strongman were not allowed to compete in the World's Strongest Man ("WSM"), which is produced by TWI and thus neither WSM and its associated Strongman Super Series nor the IFSA circuit could claim to have a comprehensive field of the top athletes. Some events did exist that bridged the divide between the major organizations, such as the Arnold Strongman Classic and Fortissimus.

=== Dissolution of IFSA/birth of SCL ===
After the 2007 IFSA World Championships in South Korea, news began to circulate of athletes not being paid, and equipment shipping costs not being honored. IFSA eventually ended up owing $63,000 for shipping their equipment from England to South Korea and finally to Philadelphia. When the money was not paid, the equipment was put up for sale and was eventually purchased by other strongman contest promoters. The 2007 IFSA World Championships would be the final contest run solely by, and under the banner of, IFSA.

In 2008 IFSA executives Ilkka Kinnunen and Marcel Mostert developed the Strongman Champions League and negotiated with IFSA to use its athletes. However, the dissolution of IFSA meant that since the end of 2007, the Strongman Champions League still operated independent of IFSA. Gradually, the last vestiges of IFSA influence began to diminish which led to the breaking down of barriers between the various concurrent circuits. Strength athletes were able to compete in more than one circuit and did so, with a cross over of athletes between the Giants Live circuit, the Strongman Champions League and the Strongman Super Series being apparent. The 2009 World's Strongest Man was therefore anticipated by the strength athletics world as promising to be "the best one yet" because the organisers could ensure invites were made to "every top athlete in the world" regardless of their affiliation to any particular strength athletics body.

== IFSA Strongman World Championships ==
IFSA Strongman World Championships
- Founded: 2005
- Folded: 2007
- Last champion: (Ukraine) Vasyl Virastyuk (2007)
- Tournament format: Multi-event competition

=== 2005: IFSA Strongman World Championships ===
Dates: 25 September 2005

Quebec City, Canada

Position	Name	Country	Points
1.	Žydrūnas Savickas	(Lithuania)	103
2.	Vasyl Virastyuk	(Ukraine)	96
3.	Mikhail Koklyaev	(Russia)	93.5
4.	Andrus Murumets	(Estonia)	86
5.	Raimonds Bergmanis	(Latvia)	84.5
6.	Phil Pfister	(United States)	82.5
7.	Vidas Blekaitis	(Lithuania)	81.5
8.	Magnus Samuelsson	(Sweden)	69
9.	Robert Szczepanski	(Poland)	67
10.	Travis Ortmayer	(United States)	64.5
11.	Geoff Dolan	(Canada)	54.5
12.	Karl Gillingham	(United States)	43

=== 2006: IFSA Strongman World Championships ===
Dates: 24, 25 November 2006

Reykjavik, Iceland

- This was the first year that qualifying heats were used. There were 3 heats, with the top 4 from each heat moving on to the finals.

Position	Name	Country	Points
1.	Žydrūnas Savickas	(Lithuania)	80.5
2.	Mikhail Koklyaev	(Russia)	78.5
3.	Vasyl Virastyuk	(Ukraine)	72
4.	Vidas Blekaitis	(Lithuania)	70
5.	Andrus Murumets	(Estonia)	55
6.	Robert Szczepanski	(Poland)	46.5
7.	Benedikt Magnusson	(Iceland)	44.5
8.	Oli Thompson	(United Kingdom)	43
9.	Nick Best	(United States)	38
10.	Travis Ortmayer	(United States)	35
11.	Saulius Brusokas	(Lithuania)	33.5
12.	Ervin Katona	(Serbia)	20.5

=== 2007: IFSA Strongman World Championships ===
Dates: 12–15 September 2007

Geumsan, South Korea

- The 2007 competition included 6 qualifying heats, with the top 2 from each heat moving on to the finals.

Position	Name	Country	Points
1.	Vasyl Virastyuk	(Ukraine)	57.5
2.	Mikhail Koklyaev	(Russia)	52.5
3.	Žydrūnas Savickas	(Lithuania)	51.5
4.	Derek Poundstone	(United States)	50.5
5.	Andrus Murumets	(Estonia)	46.5
6.	Vidas Blekaitis	(Lithuania)	41.5
7.	Robert Szczepanski	(Poland)	40
8.	Van Hatfield	(United States)	32.5
9.	Saulius Brusokas	(Lithuania)	29.5
10.	Tom McClure	(United States)	26
11.	Ervin Katona	(Serbia)	20.5
12.	Jarno Hams	(Netherlands)	17.5

== Grand Prix events ==
=== 1995 ===
Name and Location	Champion	Runner-up	3rd Place
Copenhagen, Denmark World's Strongest Viking	(Germany) Heinz Ollesch	(Denmark) Flemming Rasmussen	(Iceland) Torfi Olaffson
Klaipėda, Lithuania Lithuania Grand Prix	(United Kingdom) Gary Taylor	(United Kingdom) Forbes Cowan	(Lithuania) Stasys Mėčius
Garmisch-Partenkirchen, Germany Manfred Höberl Classic	(Iceland) Magnus Ver Magnusson	(Wales) Gary Taylor	(Germany) Heinz Ollesch
Scandinavia's Strongest Man	(Denmark) Flemming Rasmussen		

=== 1996 ===
Name and Location	Champion	Runner-up	3rd Place	Date
Copenhagen, Denmark World's Strongest Viking	(Denmark) Flemming Rasmussen	(Iceland) Magnus Ver Magnusson	(Iceland) Torfi Olaffson	
Denmark Denmark Grand Prix	(Finland) Riku Kiri	(Iceland) Magnus Ver Magnusson	(Denmark) Flemming Rasmussen	
Klaipėda, Lithuania Lithuania Grand Prix	(Finland) Riku Kiri	(Germany) Heinz Ollesch	(Iceland) Magnus Ver Magnusson	7 July 1996
Scandinavia's Strongest Man	(Denmark) Flemming Rasmussen			

=== 1997 ===
Name and Location	Champion	Runner-up	3rd Place
Meerssen, Netherlands European Open	(Finland) Riku Kiri	(South Africa) Gerrit Badenhorst	(Iceland) Magnus Ver Magnusson
Copenhagen, Denmark World's Strongest Viking	(Denmark) Flemming Rasmussen	(Finland) Riku Kiri	(Iceland) Magnus Ver Magnusson
Klaipėda, Lithuania Lithuania Grand Prix	(Lithuania) Stasys Mecius	(Latvia) Raimonds Bergmanis	(Iceland) Magnus Ver Magnusson
Scandinavia's Strongest Man	(Denmark) Flemming Rasmussen		

=== 1998 ===
Name and Location	Champion	Runner-up	3rd Place	Date
Helsinki, Finland Helsinki Grand Prix	(Sweden) Magnus Samuelsson	(Finland) Riku Kiri	(Norway) Svend Karlsen	14 March 1998
Klaipėda, Lithuania Lithuania Grand Prix	(United Kingdom) Jamie Reeves	(Lithuania) Raimunds Kencivikius	(South Africa) Wayne Price	1 August 1998
Budapest, Hungary Hungary Grand Prix	(Finland) Riku Kiri	(Denmark) Flemming Rasmussen	(Hungary) László Fekete	2 August 1998
Arnbruck, Germany Germany Grand Prix	(Finland) Riku Kiri	(Finland) Jouko Ahola	(Germany) Heinz Ollesch	5 September 1998
Faroe Islands Atlantic Giant	(Sweden) Magnus Samuelsson	(Finland) Riku Kiri	(Norway) Svend Karlsen	

=== 1999 ===
Name and Location	Champion	Runner-up	3rd Place	Date
Helsinki, Finland Finland Grand Prix	(Finland) Jouko Ahola	(Finland) Sami Heinonen	(Finland) Janne Virtanen	6 March 1999
Faroe Islands Atlantic Giant	(Finland) Jouko Ahola	(Faroe Islands) Regin Vagadal	(Sweden) Magnus Samuelsson	16 May 1999
Keszthely. Hungary Hungary Grand Prix	(Netherlands) Berend Veneberg	(South Africa) Gerrit Badenhorst	(Finland) Jouko Ahola	18 July 1999
Hardenberg, Netherlands Holland Grand Prix	(South Africa) Gerrit Badenhorst	(Finland) Jouko Ahola	(Netherlands) Berend Veneberg	24 July 1999
Prague, Czech Republic Czech Grand Prix	(Sweden) Magnus Samuelsson	(Finland) Jouko Ahola	(American Samoa) Joe Onosai	14 August 1999
Iceland Viking of the North	(Canada) Hugo Girard	(Sweden) Magnus Samuelsson	(Finland) Janne Virtanen	17 October 1999
Nordic Strongman Championships	(Finland) Matti Uppa			

=== 2000 ===
Name and Location	Champion	Runner-up	3rd Place	Date
Helsinki, Finland Finland Grand Prix	(Finland) Janne Virtanen	(Sweden) Magnus Samuelsson	(Norway) Svend Karlsen	18 March 2000
(Republic of Ireland) Ireland Ireland Grand Prix	(Sweden) Magnus Samuelsson	(Finland) Janne Virtanen	(Norway) Svend Karlsen	30 April 2000
Sopot, Poland Poland Grand Prix	(Sweden) Magnus Samuelsson	(Finland) Janne Virtanen	(Poland) Jarek Dymek	25 June 2000
Faroe Islands Atlantic Giant	(Faroe Islands) Regin Vagadal	(Finland) Janne Virtanen	(Sweden) Magnus Samuelsson	2 September 2000
Prague, Czech Republic Czech Grand Prix	(Czech Republic) Jan Bártl	(Norway) Svend Karlsen	(Germany) Martin Muhr	2 September 2000
Bucharest, Romania Romania Grand Prix	(Sweden) Magnus Samuelsson	(Finland) Janne Virtanen	(Denmark) Rene Minkwitz	16 September 2000
Panyu, China China Grand Prix	(Sweden) Magnus Samuelsson	(Canada) Hugo Girard	(Finland) Janne Virtanen	8 October 2000

=== 2001 ===
Name and Location	Champion	Runner-up	3rd Place	Date
Sopot, Poland Poland Grand Prix	(Poland) Jarek Dymek	(Finland) Janne Virtanen	(Norway) Svend Karlsen	10 March 2007
Faroe Islands Atlantic Giant	(Faroe Islands) Regin Vágadal	(Finland) Janne Virtanen	(Poland) Jarek Dymek	28 July 2007
Kokkola, Finland Strongman World Record Breakers	(Norway) Svend Karlsen	(Netherlands) Wout Zijlstra	(Denmark) Rene Minkwitz	26 August 2007

=== 2002 ===
Name and Location	Champion	Runner-up	3rd Place	Date
Szczyrk, Poland Winter Cup International	(Finland) Janne Virtanen	(Poland) Jarek Dymek	(Canada) Hugo Girard	9 February 2002
Vantaa, Finland Finland Grand Prix	(Finland) Janne Virtanen	(Norway) Svend Karlsen	(Finland) Juha-Matti Räsänen	20 April 2002
Istanbul, Turkey Turkey Grand Prix	(Finland) Janne Virtanen	(Netherlands) Wout Zijlstra	(Austria) Bernd Kerschbaumer	18 May 2002
Mariehamn, Finland Åland Grand Prix	(Sweden) Jorma Paananen	(Denmark) Rene Minkwitz	(Finland) Harri Simonen	10 August 2002
Imatra, Finland Nordic Championships	(Finland) Juha-Matti Räsänen	(Denmark) Rene Minkwitz	(Sweden) Anders Johansson	17 August 2002
Panyu, China China Grand Prix	(Norway) Svend Karlsen	(Finland) Juha-Matti Räsänen	(Lithuania) Žydrūnas Savickas	20 October 2002

=== 2003 ===
Name and Location	Champion	Runner-up	3rd Place	Date
Inowrocław, Poland Poland Grand Prix	(Poland) Jarek Dymek	(Poland) Robert Szczepański	(Latvia) Raimonds Bergmanis	12 April 2003
Vantaa, Finland Finland Grand Prix	(Finland) Janne Virtanen	(Poland) Mariusz Pudzianowski	(Finland) Juha-Matti Räsänen	17 May 2003
Winnipeg, Canada All Strength Challenge	(United Kingdom) Eddy Ellwood	(Estonia) Andrus Murumets	(Netherlands) Peter Baltus	15 June 2003
Ylitornio, Finland Ylitornio Challenge	(Poland) Mariusz Pudzianowski	(Finland) Janne Virtanen	(Lithuania) Vidas Blekaitis	28 June 2003
Gdynia, Poland Strongman World Record Breakers	(Poland) Mariusz Pudzianowski	(Poland) Jarek Dymek	(Sweden) Magnus Samuelsson	24 August 2003
Sopron, Hungary Hungarian Strongman Challenge	(Serbia) Ervin Katona	(Hungary) Ádám Darázs	(Finland) Tomi Lotta	15 November 2003

=== 2004 ===
Name and Location	Champion	Runner-up	3rd Place	Date
Jūrmala, Latvia Baltic Strongest Man	(Latvia) Raimonds Bergmanis	(Lithuania) Žydrūnas Savickas	(Lithuania) Vilius Petrauskas	22 May 2004
Turkey Turkey Champions Trophy	(Poland) Mariusz Pudzianowski	(Finland) Tomi Lotta	(Norway) Svend Karlsen	22 May 2004
Doetinchem, Netherlands Holland Champions Trophy	(Poland) Mariusz Pudzianowski	(Norway) Svend Karlsen	(Lithuania) Žydrūnas Savickas	13 June 2004
Ukraine Ukraine Grand Prix	(Ukraine) Vasyl Virastyuk	(Sweden) Magnus Samuelsson	(Lithuania) Žydrūnas Savickas	20 June 2004
Šiauliai, Lithuania CEKOL Cup	(Lithuania) Žydrūnas Savickas	(Ukraine) Vasyl Virastyuk	(Poland) Tomasz Nowotniak	3 July 2004
Riga, Latvia All Strength Challenge	(Poland) Mariusz Pudzianowski	(Latvia) Raimonds Bergmanis	(Ukraine) Vasyl Virastyuk	18 July 2004
Szeged, Hungary International Gold	(Serbia) Ervin Katona	(Lithuania) Saulius Brusokas	(South Africa) Ettiene Smit	11 September 2004

=== 2005 ===
Beginning in 2005, IFSA cut all ties with World's Strongest Man and Strongman Super Series and began hosting their own grand prix events and world championships from 2005 to 2007.

Name and Location	Champion	Runner-up	3rd Place	Date
Szeged, Hungary Hungary Grand Prix	(Lithuania) Žydrūnas Savickas	(Denmark) Rene Minkwitz	(South Africa) Ettiene Smit	1 May 2005
Dubai, United Arab Emirates Dubai Grand Prix	(Finland) Tomi Lotta	(Poland) Robert Szczepański	(Estonia) Andrus Murumets	19 May 2005
Moscow, Russia Russia Grand Prix	(Lithuania) Žydrūnas Savickas	(Latvia) Raimonds Bergmanis	(Russia) Mikhail Koklyaev	6 June 2005
Doetinchem, Netherlands Holland Grand Prix	(Finland) Tomi Lotta	(Netherlands) Jarno Hams	(Denmark) Rene Minkwitz	12 June 2005
Hungary West European Championships	(Netherlands) Jarno Hams	(Hungary) Ádám Darázs	(Slovakia) Jan Křeháček	25 June 2005
Riga, Latvia European Championships	(Lithuania) Žydrūnas Savickas	(Finland) Tomi Lotta	(Estonia) Andrus Murumets	17 July 2005
Kristiansand, Norway Nordic Championships	(Norway) Svend Karlsen	(Sweden) Magnus Samuelsson	(Finland) Juha-Matti Räsänen	6 August 2005
São Paulo, Brazil World Open	(Russia) Mikhail Koklyaev	(Norway) Svend Karlsen	(Poland) Robert Szczepański	20 August 2005
São Paulo, Brazil Pan American Championships	(United States) Phil Pfister	(United States) Travis Ortmayer	(United States) Karl Gillingham	21 August 2005
Šiauliai, Lithuania CEKOL Cup	(Lithuania) Žydrūnas Savickas	(Lithuania) Vilius Petrauskas	(Estonia) Andrus Murumets	27 August 2005
Denmark Denmark Grand Prix	(Denmark) Rene Minkwitz	(United States) Van Hatfield	(Finland) Juha-Pekka Aitala	20 November 2005

=== 2006 ===
Name and Location	Champion	Runner-up	3rd Place	Date
Kyiv, Ukraine Ukrainian Open	(Lithuania) Žydrūnas Savickas	(Denmark) Rene Minkwitz	(South Africa) Ettiene Smit	18 April 2006
Dubai, United Arab Emirates Dubai Grand Prix	(Lithuania) Žydrūnas Savickas	(Canada) Geoff Dolan	(Estonia) Andrus Murumets	24 April 2006
Moscow, Russia Russia Grand Prix	(Russia) Mikhail Koklyaev	(Estonia) Andrus Murumets	(Lithuania) Žydrūnas Savickas	14 May 2006
(United States) Tulsa, Oklahoma World Strongman Challenge	(Lithuania) Žydrūnas Savickas	(United States) Derek Poundstone	(United States) Jon Andersen	21 May 2006
Salou, Spain Spain Grand Prix	(Finland) Juha-Pekka Aitala	(Syria) Simon Sulaiman	(Netherlands) Jarno Hams	5 June 2006
Eger, Hungary Hungary Grand Prix	(Russia) Mikhail Koklyaev	(Ukraine) Vasyl Virastyuk	(United States) Travis Ortmayer	5 June 2006
Terborg, Netherlands Holland Grand Prix	(Lithuania) Žydrūnas Savickas	(United States) Jon Andersen	(Netherlands) Jarno Hams	10 June 2006
Riga, Latvia Latvia World Cup	(Lithuania) Žydrūnas Savickas	(Latvia) Raimonds Bergmanis	(Russia) Mikhail Koklyaev	18 July 2006
Tornio, Finland Finland Grand Prix	(Estonia) Andrus Murumets	(Poland) Robert Szczepanski	(United States) Steve MacDonald	5 August 2006
Kyiv, Ukraine Ukraine Grand Prix	(Ukraine) Vasyl Virastyuk	(Lithuania) Vidas Blekaitis	(Ukraine) Oleksandr Pekanov	29 December 2006

==== United Strongman Series ====
Name and Location	Champion	Runner-up	3rd Place	Date
Kyiv, Ukraine USS Kyiv	(Poland) Sebastian Wenta	(Russia) Igor Pedan	(Ukraine) Viktor Yurchenko	18 April 2006
Limassol, Cyprus USS Cyprus	(United States) Travis Ortmayer	(Russia) Igor Pedan	(Latvia) Raimonds Bergmanis	28 May 2006
Belgrade, Serbia USS Belgrade	(Serbia) Ervin Katona	(Canada) Geoff Dolan	(Poland) Sebastian Wenta	20 June 2006
Moscow, Russia USS Moscow	(Poland) Sebastian Wenta	(Russia) Igor Pedan	(Serbia) Ervin Katona	1 July 2006
Marijampolė, Lithuania USS Lithuania	(Lithuania) Žydrūnas Savickas	(Lithuania) Vidas Blekaitis	(Russia) Igor Pedan	19 August 2006

=== 2007 ===
Name and Location	Champion	Runner-up	3rd Place	Date
Riga, Latvia Latvia Grand Prix	(Estonia) Andrus Murumets	(Ukraine) Vasyl Virastyuk	(Lithuania) Vidas Blekaitis	17 March 2007
Ulft, Netherlands Holland Grand Prix	(Netherlands) Jarno Hams	(South Africa) Ettiene Smit	(Iceland) Georg Ögmundsson	17 June 2007
Sofia, Bulgaria Bulgaria Grand Prix	(Poland) Robert Szczepanski	(Finland) Janne Illikainen	(Serbia) Ervin Katona	23 June 2007
Kyiv, Ukraine European Championships	(Ukraine) Vasyl Virastyuk	(Estonia) Andrus Murumets	(Lithuania) Vidas Blekaitis	22 July 2007
Klaipėda, Lithuania Lithuania Grand Prix	(Lithuania) Žydrūnas Savickas	(Estonia) Andrus Murumets	(Finland) Janne Illikainen	28 July 2007
Oulu, Finland Finland Grand Prix	(Estonia) Andrus Murumets	(Finland) Janne Illikainen	(Poland) Robert Szczepanski	2 September 2007

== Strongman Champions League ==
Developed by Ilkka Kinnunen and Marcel Mostert, the Strongman Champions League was launched in 2008 as "a new episode in strongman". It negotiated with IFSA to use its athletes. Since the end of 2008, the Strongman Champions League still operates independently after the dissolution of IFSA:

=== 2008 ===
Name and Location	Champion	Runner-up	3rd Place	Date
Riga, Latvia SCL Latvia	(Lithuania) Žydrūnas Savickas	(United States) Travis Ortmayer	(Latvia) Agris Kazelniks	22 March 2008
Subotica, Serbia SCL Serbia	(Lithuania) Žydrūnas Savickas	(Serbia) Ervin Katona	(Estonia) Andrus Murumets	10 May 2008
Varsseveld, Netherlands SCL Holland	(Lithuania) Žydrūnas Savickas	(Estonia) Andrus Murumets	(United States) Travis Ortmayer	1 June 2008
Sofia, Bulgaria SCL Bulgaria	(Estonia) Andrus Murumets	(Lithuania) Žydrūnas Savickas	(Serbia) Ervin Katona	21 June 2008
Vilnius, Lithuania SCL Lithuania	(Lithuania) Žydrūnas Savickas	(Lithuania) Vidas Blekaitis	(Lithuania) Saulius Brusokas	2 August 2008
Constanța, Romania SCL Romania	(Lithuania) Žydrūnas Savickas	(Serbia) Ervin Katona	(Ukraine) Oleksandr Lashyn	16 August 2008
Kokkola, Finland SCL Finland	(Russia) Mikhail Koklyaev	(Lithuania) Žydrūnas Savickas	(Serbia) Ervin Katona	29 August 2008
Overall placings	(Lithuania) Žydrūnas Savickas; 130 points	(Serbia) Ervin Katona; 72 points	(Latvia) Agris Kazelniks; 60 points	

Events were planned in the following locations but cancelled: Dubai, Germany and Hungary

== UK Regional Competitions ==
=== British Championships (IFSA) ===
Year	Champion	Runner-up	3rd Place
2005	(England) Mark Felix	(England) Oli Thompson	(England) Andrew Raynes

=== UK Championship (IFSA) ===
Year	Champion	Runner-up	3rd Place
1997	(Scotland) Stuart Murray	(England) Steve Brooks	(England) Russ Bradley
1999	(Northern Ireland) Glenn Ross	TBC	TBC

==== IFSA England's Strongest Man ====
Year	Champion	Runner-up	3rd Place
2005	(England) Eddy Ellwood	(England) Mark Felix	(England) Oli Thompson

== See also ==
- List of strongman competitions
