= Riku Kiri =

Finnish strongman & powerlifter (born 1963)

Personal information
- Born: April 5, 1963 (age 63) Kotka, Finland
- Occupation(s): Powerlifting, Strongman
- Height: 6 ft 4 in (1.93 m)
- Spouse: Sari Kiri
Medal record
Strongman
Representing Finland
World's Strongest Man
3rd	1993 World's Strongest Man
3rd	1994 World's Strongest Man
2nd	1996 World's Strongest Man
Qualified	1997 World's Strongest Man
6th	1998 World's Strongest Man
World Strongman Challenge
1st	1988
1st	1991
Le Defi Mark Ten International
2nd	1985
World's Strongest Team
1st	1997 w/Jouko Ahola
Europe's Strongest Man
1st	1995
1st	1996
1st	1997
European Hercules
1st	1990
1st	1991
1st	1992
1st	1993
IFSA European Open
1st	1995
1st	1997
Finland's Strongest Man
1st	1988
1st	1993
1st	1994

Riku Kiri
Medal record
Representing Finland
Powerlifting
EPF European Powerlifting Championships
2nd	1986	+125kg
FPF Finnish Powerlifting Championships
2nd	1984	125kg
2nd	1985	125kg
1st	1986	+125kg
NPF Nordic Powerlifting Championships
2nd	1986	+125kg

Riku Kiri (born April 5, 1963 in Kotka, Finland) is a Finnish former strongman and powerlifter. He is best known for competing in the World's Strongest Man competition, narrowly missing out on capturing the title on more than one occasion. Several strength analysts and historians regard him as "the strongest man never to win World's Strongest Man".

Having competed in 28 International strongman competitions, he has won 14 of them, including Europe's Strongest Man title three times.

== Early life and career ==
Kiri was a child prodigy and started lifting weights at the age of seven.

At 19 years old in 1983, Kiri held a World Record in powerlifting in the squat in IPF competition, with a lift of 350 kg (772 lb) in 125 kg weight category. In one of his first ever strongman competitions in 1985, he defeated the reigning World's Strongest Man Jón Páll Sigmarsson.

The 1.94 m (6 ft 4 in), 145 kg (320 lb) prime Kiri is particularly noted for his static strength including a 300 kg (661 lb) single-arm deadlift and a 302.5 kg (667 lb) raw bench press. He squatted 440 kg (970 lb) in the Dutch Open strongman contest of 1995 in a Smith machine apparatus. He also bench pressed 290 kg (639 lb) raw in an official WPC meet along with many other records.

For most of his appearances in World's Strongest Man competition, Kiri was hampered by ankle injuries. Although Kiri placed 3rd and 2nd respectively in 1993 and 1996, ankle injuries plagued him during both contests. In reference to the Car Carry event in 1993, Kiri's coach, Markku Suonenvirta, famously said: "His ankle is broken but he's a tough guy." Kiri's ankle was in fact not broken but badly injured and weakened. In the 1996 WSM final event (Power Stairs) Kiri was about to go head to head with Magnus Ver Magnusson. However, just after the starter's whistle, Kiri dropped out due to another ankle injury. Kiri was also forced to drop out of the 1998 World's Strongest Man final due to an ankle injury, finishing in 6th place.

His background is in security work, and he holds shares in Gold's Gym-Helsinki.

== Personal records ==
=== Strongman ===
- Deadlift (for reps) – 380 kg (838 lb) x 4 reps, 352.5 kg (777 lb) x 7 reps (raw)
- Silver dollar safe squat (for reps) – 310 kg (683 lb) × 4 reps (1999 AFSA Dubai Full Strength Challenge) (World Record)
- Smith machine Squat – 440 kg (970 lb) (1995 Dutch Open) (partial lift not to parallel depth)
- Log press – 150 kg (331 lb) (1997 World's Strongest Man, group 2)
- Log press (for reps) – 125 kg (276 lb) x 15 reps (1998 IFSA German Grand Prix)
- Atlas stones – 5 stones weighing 160–210 kg (353–463 lb) (1998 IFSA Hungary Grand Prix)
- Hercules hold – 136 kg (300 lb) in each hand (direct weight) for 63.60 seconds (1993 World's Strongest Man) (former world record)
- Natural Stone press – 120 kg (265 lb) (1997 Europe's Strongest Man)
- Stone block throw – 18 kg (40 lb) over 5.90 metres (19 ft 4 in) (1992 World Muscle Power Classic) (World Record)
- Keg toss – 20 kg (44 lb) over 5.70 metres (18 ft 8 in) (1997 European Open) (former world record)
- Duck walk – 300 kg (661 lb) for 12m course in 15.03 seconds (1999 AFSA Dubai Full Strength Challenge) (World Record)
- Cable drum push – 1,200 kg (2,646 lb) on a 5 hump course in 38.41 seconds (1999 AFSA Dubai Full Strength Challenge) (World Record)
- Arm over arm plane pull – 10,000 kg (22,046 lb) for 15m course in 27.70 seconds (1993 World Viking Challenge) (World Record)

=== Powerlifting ===
- Squat – 400 kg (882 lb) (raw)
- Bench press – 302.5 kg (667 lb) (raw)
- Bench press (for reps) – 200 kg (441 lb) x 14 reps (raw)
- Deadlift – 390 kg (860 lb) (raw)
- Total – 1,092.5 kg (2,409 lb) (raw)
