= Joe Onosai =

Samoan strongman and American football player (born 1965)

Personal information
- Born: December 10, 1965 (age 60) American Samoa
- Occupation(s): Strongman, Pro football
- Height: 6 ft 4 in (1.93 m)
Medal record
Strongman
Representing (American Samoa) Samoa
World's Strongest Man
| 7th | 1994 World's Strongest Man |
| 9th | 1995 World's Strongest Man |
| Qualified | 1997 World's Strongest Man |
| Qualified | 1999 World's Strongest Man |
IFSA
| 3rd | 1999 Prague Grand Prix |
World Strongman Challenge
| 3rd | 1999 |

Joseph F. Onosai (born December 10, 1965) is a former strongman competitor and American football player. Onosai was drafted by the National Football League (NFL)'s Dallas Cowboys. He reached the finals of the World's Strongest Man competition twice (1994 and 1995).

== Early years ==
Onosai attended University Laboratory School where he was a 240-pound fullback. As a junior, he averaged 13.8 yards per carry. In 1982 as a senior, he helped the Pac-Five football team win its first Interscholastic League of Honolulu and Prep Bowl championship (predecessor to the state tournament) and was named The Advertiser's ILH Offensive Player of the Year.

He received a scholarship to play for the University of Hawaiʻi at Mānoa, where he was converted into an offensive guard as a freshman. He was named a starter as a sophomore. The next year because of injuries on the offensive line, he also started at tackle and center, including a game against Long Beach State University where he played all three position. Sometimes he was used as a fullback in short-yardage situations.

As a senior, he was moved to center and received honorable-mention All-American honors. He was a second-team All-Western Athletic Conference performer in 1985 and 1986.

== Professional career ==
Onosai was selected by the Dallas Cowboys in the sixth round (151st overall) of the 1987 NFL draft to play center. During a practice in training camp, he suffered a serious neck injury and was subsequently diagnosed with a narrow spinal column condition (cervical spinal stenosis), which forced him to announce his early retirement on August 1, 1987. It would eventually take four days for the strength in his legs to return and two years to get his upper-body strength back to normal.

== World's Strongest Man competition ==
He participated in the World's Strongest Man competition for many years. At 6-feet-4 and 400 pounds, he developed a 65-inch chest, 22-inch biceps and the power lift was his specialty. He made it to the finals twice, in 1994 and 1995.

== Personal records ==
- Leviathan Press (incline log press) – 105 kg (231 lb) x 23 reps (1995 World's Strongest Man, group 1) (Joint-World Record)
- Flintstone barbell push press (behind the neck) – 205 kg (452 lb) (1995 World's Strongest Man)
- Keg toss – 25 kg (55 lb) over 4.40 metres (14 ft 5 in) (1995 Manfred Hoeberl Classic)

== Personal life ==
Onosai has been a pastor at Destiny Christian Church since 2011.
