= Anton Boucher =

Nambibian strongman

Personal information
- Born: June 6, 1973 (age 53) Namibia
- Height: 6 ft 0 in (1.83 m)
- Weight: 297 lb (135 kg)
Medal record
Strongman
Representing Namibia
World's Strongest Man
6th	1994 World's Strongest Man
Qualified	1995 World's Strongest Man
World's Strongest Team
3rd	1995 w/Gerrit Badenhorst & Wayne Price
South Africa's Strongest Man
2nd	1994
3rd	1995
- Updated on 7 September 2015

Anton Boucher is a former professional strongman competitor from Namibia. Anton was a finalist in the 1994 World's Strongest Man at just 21 years of age. He began competing in 1992 and won many titles as a junior. Allegedly, Anton could press 250 lb overhead at the age of 14.

== Personal records ==
- Leviathan Press (incline log press) – 105 kg (231 lb) x 23 reps (1994 World Muscle Power Classic) (Joint-World Record)
