= Wayne Price =

Personal information
- Born: South Africa
- Occupation: Strongman
- Height: 6 ft 2 in (1.88 m)
Medal record
Strongman
Representing South Africa
World's Strongest Man
Qualified	1994 World's Strongest Man
8th	1995 World's Strongest Man
Qualified	1998 World's Strongest Man
Strongest Man on Earth
4th	1994
World's Strongest Team
3rd	1995 w/Gerrit Badenhorst & Anton Boucher
World Mighty Man
8th	1992
6th	1993
South Africa's Strongest Man
1st	1991
2nd	1992
2nd	1993
3rd	1994
2nd	1995
AFSA Las Vegas Grand Prix
1st	1999

Wayne Price is a former professional strongman competitor from South Africa. Wayne was a finalist in the 1995 World's Strongest Man contest, and was South Africa's Strongest Man in 1991. Gary Taylor was a close friend and training partner of Wayne's in the 1990s

In 2001, Wayne joined the MTN Gladiators series, serving as its referee.

== Personal records ==
- Log press – 150 kg (331 lb) (1994 Strongest Man on Earth)
