= 1993 World's Strongest Man =

Strongman competition in 1993

Competition information
- Dates: 1993
- Location: Orange
- Country: France
- Athletes participating: 8
- Nations participating: 8

Champion(s)
- (Wales) Gary Taylor

The 1993 World's Strongest Man was the 16th edition of World's Strongest Man and was won by Gary Taylor from the United Kingdom. It was his first title after finishing fifth the previous year. 1991 winner Magnus Ver Magnusson from Iceland was runner up for the second year in a row, and Riku Kiri from Finland finished third. The contest was held in Orange, France.

== Events ==
1. The Juggernaut
2. Leviathan lift
3. Samson's barrow
4. Clash of the titans
5. Car Carry
6. Hercules's hold
7. The Trojan Wall
8. Atlas Stones

== Final results ==
#	Name	Nationality	Pts
1	Gary Taylor	Wales	54
2	Magnús Ver Magnússon	Iceland	49
3	Riku Kiri	Finland	48.5
4	Manfred Hoeberl	Austria	41.5
5	Berend Veneberg	Netherlands	26
6	Harold "Iron Bear" Collins	United States	24.5
7	Henrik Ravn	Denmark	23
8	Gerrit Badenhorst (injured)	South Africa	17.5

Preceded by 1992 World's Strongest Man	1993 World's Strongest Man	Succeeded by 1994 World's Strongest Man
