= 1994 World's Strongest Man =

Strongman competition in 1994

Competition information
- Dates: 18-24 October 1994
- Venue: Sun City
- Country: South Africa
- Athletes participating: 16
- Nations participating: 16

Champion(s)
- (Iceland) Magnús Ver Magnússon

The 1994 World's Strongest Man was the 17th edition of World's Strongest Man and was won by Magnus Ver Magnusson from Iceland. It was his second title after finishing second the previous 2 years in a row. Manfred Hoeberl from Austria finished second after finishing fourth the previous year, and Riku Kiri from Finland finished third for the second consecutive time. The contest was held in Sun City, South Africa. This was the first year that the qualifying heats were implemented, and surprisingly, the 1993 champion Gary Taylor failed to qualify for the finals.

== Heats ==
=== Group 1 ===
Position	Name	Nationality	Points
1.	Forbes Cowan	Scotland	11
2.	Joe Onosai	Samoa	11
3.	Gary Taylor	Wales	11
4.	Bill Lyndon	Australia	7

=== Group 2 ===
Position	Name	Nationality	Points
1.	Manfred Hoeberl	Austria	14
2.	Ted van der Parre	Netherlands	11
3.	László Fekete	Hungary	10
4.	Ron Trottier	Canada	5

=== Group 3 ===
Position	Name	Nationality	Points
1.	Magnús Ver Magnússon	Iceland	13
2.	Anton Boucher	Namibia	12
3.	Wayne Price	South Africa	10
4.	Henrik Ravn	Denmark	3 (injured)

=== Group 4 ===
Position	Name	Nationality	Points
1.	Riku Kiri	Finland	14
2.	Gerrit Badenhorst	South Africa	13
3.	Heinz Ollesch	Germany	9
4.	Steve Pulcinella	United States	4

== Events of the Final ==
- Harness & Rope Pull
- Samson's Barrow
- Rock Lift
- Car Walk
- Hercules's Hold
- Dead Lift
- Pole Push
- McGlashan Stones

== Final results ==
#	Name	Nationality	Pts
1	Magnús Ver Magnússon	Iceland	50.5
2	Manfred Hoeberl	Austria	49.5
3	Riku Kiri	Finland	48
4	Gerrit Badenhorst	South Africa	38.5
5	Forbes Cowan	Scotland	36.5
6	Anton Boucher	Namibia	31.5
7	Joe Onosai	Samoa	12.5 (injured)
8	Ted Van Der Parre	Netherlands	7 (injured)

Preceded by 1993 World's Strongest Man	1994 World's Strongest Man	Succeeded by 1995 World's Strongest Man
