= 1996 World's Strongest Man =

Strongman competition in 1996

Competition information
- Dates: 1996
- Location: Port Louis
- Country: Mauritius
- Athletes participating: 24
- Nations participating: 21

Champion(s)
- (Iceland) Magnús Ver Magnússon

The 1996 World's Strongest Man was the 19th edition of World's Strongest Man and was won by Magnús Ver Magnússon from Iceland. This was Magnús' fourth WSM title, tying the record of fellow Icelander Jón Páll Sigmarsson. Riku Kiri from Finland finished second, and Gerrit Badenhorst from South Africa finished third after finishing second the previous year. The contest was held in Port Louis, Mauritius.

== Heats ==
=== Group 1 ===
Place	Name	Nationality	Points
1.	Magnús Ver Magnússon	Iceland	20
1.	Jorma Ojanaho	Finland	20
3.	Nathan Jones	Australia	17
4.	Paul Lepik	Canada	10
4.	Vladimir Turchinsky	Russia	10
6.	Stasys Mėčius	Lithuania	10

=== Group 2 ===
Place	Name	Nationality	Points
1.	Gerrit Badenhorst	South Africa	19
2.	Forbes Cowan	Scotland	18
3.	Bill Lyndon	Australia	14
3.	Evgeny Popov	Bulgaria	14
5.	Hjalti Arnason	Iceland	12
6.	Phil Martin	United States	7

=== Group 3 ===
Place	Name	Nationality	Points
1.	Regin Vagadal	Faroe Islands	19
2.	Raimonds Bergmanis	Latvia	18
3.	Berend Veneberg	Netherlands	15
4.	Heinz Ollesch	Germany	13
5.	Magnus Samuelsson	Sweden	12
6.	Colin Cox	New Zealand	7

=== Group 4 ===
Place	Name	Nationality	Points
1.	Riku Kiri	Finland	18
2.	Flemming Rasmussen	Denmark	16
3.	Derek Boyer	Fiji	15
3.	Svend Karlsen	Norway	15
5.	Bill Pittuck	England	14
6.	Brian Bell	Scotland	6

== Events of the Final ==
- Harness & Rope Pull
- Car Rolling
- Throw for Height
- Hercules's Hold
- Cask Circle
- Farmer's Walk
- Dead Lift
- Power Stairs

== Final results ==
#	Name	Nationality	Pts
1	Magnús Ver Magnússon	Iceland	52
2	Riku Kiri	Finland	43
3	Gerrit Badenhorst	South Africa	41
4	Flemming Rasmussen	Denmark	35.5
5	Forbes Cowan	Scotland	34
6	Jorma Ojanaho	Finland	32.5
7	Raimonds Bergmanis	Latvia	25
8	Regin Vagadal	Faroe Islands	24

Preceded by 1995 World's Strongest Man	1996 World's Strongest Man	Succeeded by 1997 World's Strongest Man
