= 1997 World's Strongest Man =

Strongman competition in 1997

Competition information
- Dates: 2-13 October 1997
- Venue: Primm Valley Resort
- Location: Primm, Nevada
- Country: United States
- Athletes participating: 32
- Nations participating: 20

Champion(s)
- (Finland) Jouko Ahola

The 1997 World's Strongest Man was the 20th edition of World's Strongest Man and was won by Jouko Ahola from Finland. It was his first title. Flemming Rasmussen from Denmark finished second after finishing fourth the previous year, and Magnus Samuelsson from Sweden finished third. Three time defending champion Magnus Ver Magnusson, chasing a fourth straight title and record fifth overall, was eliminated in the qualifying heats. The contest was held in Primm Valley Resort, Nevada.

== Heats ==
=== Group 1 ===
Position	Name	Nationality	Points
1.	Svend Karlsen	Norway	21
2.	Torfi Ólafsson	Iceland	16
3.	Magnús Ver Magnússon	Iceland	15
4.	Regin Vagadal	Faroe Islands	13.5
5.	Joe Onosai	Samoa	11
6.	Brian Bell	Scotland	7.5

=== Group 2 ===
Position	Name	Nationality	Points
1.	Raimonds Bergmanis	Latvia	18.5
2.	Derek Boyer	Fiji	17.5
3.	Riku Kiri	Finland	17.5
4.	Russ Bradley	England	16
5.	Evgeny Popov	Bulgaria	10.5
6.	Jean-Luc Moalli	France	4

=== Group 3 ===
Position	Name	Nationality	Points
1.	Magnus Samuelsson	Sweden	20
2.	Heinz Ollesch	Germany	19
3.	Gerrit Badenhorst	South Africa	16
4.	Berend Veneberg	Netherlands	10 (injured)
4.	Paul Lepik	Estonia	10
6.	Ginaud Dupuis	Canada	8

=== Group 4 ===
Position	Name	Nationality	Points
1.	Flemming Rasmussen	Denmark	20
2.	Jouko Ahola	Finland	18
3.	Robert Weir	England	16
4.	Bill Lyndon	Australia	15
5.	Michael Abdullah	Japan*	9
6.	Bernard Rolle	Bahamas	6

- Michael Abdullah comes from Lebanon, but he represents Japan at the World's Strongest Man Championship.

=== Group USA ===
Position	Name	Nationality	Points
1.	Mark Philippi	United States	108
2.	Harold "Iron Bear" Collins	United States	85.5
3.	Tommy Ingalsbe	United States	83.5
4.	Ken Brown	United States	79.5
4.	Phil Martin	United States	79.5
6.	Kevin Toth	United States	68
7.	James Voronin	United States	64.5
8.	Gary Mitchell	United States	46.5 (Injured)

- The USA Group was actually the inaugural America's Strongest Man contest and took place at the Primm Valley Resort several weeks before the other qualifying heats.

== Final results ==
#	Name	Nationality	Truck Pull	Log Lift	Car Roll	Husafell Stone	Squat	Keg Loading	Dead Lift	Final Race	Pts
1	Jouko Ahola	Finland	6	9	6	8	7	9	10	6	61
2	Flemming Rasmussen	Denmark	10	9	5	7	8	10	4	4	57
3	Magnus Samuelsson	Sweden	9	1.5	10	10	3	7	2	10	52.5
4	Torfi Ólafsson	Iceland	5	4	7	4	4.5	6	7	8	45.5
5	Raimonds Bergmanis	Latvia	4	4	1	6	4.5	8	8	9	44.5
6	Heinz Ollesch	Germany	7	6.5	8	3	2	4	6	7	43.5
7	Mark Philippi	United States	1	6.5	4	2	10	3	9	5	40.5
8	Svend Karlsen	Norway	8	4	9	9	1	1	1	0	33
9	Derek Boyer	Fiji	3	1.5	3	5	6	5	5	0	28.5
10	Harold "Iron Bear" Collins	United States	2	9	2	1	9	2	3	0	28

== See also ==
- America's Strongest Man

Preceded by 1996 World's Strongest Man	1997 World's Strongest Man	Succeeded by 1998 World's Strongest Man
