= 1995 World's Strongest Man =

Strongman competition in 1995

Competition information
- Dates: 2-8 October 1995
- Location: Nassau
- Country: Bahamas
- Athletes participating: 20
- Nations participating: 15

Champion(s)
- (Iceland) Magnús Ver Magnússon

The 1995 World's Strongest Man was the 18th edition of World's Strongest Man and was won by Magnus Ver Magnusson from Iceland, it was his second consecutive and third overall title. Gerrit Badenhorst from South Africa finished second after finishing fourth the previous year, and Marko Varalahti from Finland finished third. The contest was held in Nassau, Bahamas.

== Heats ==
=== Group 1 ===
Position	Name	Nationality	Points
1.	Magnús Ver Magnússon	Iceland	12
1.	Joe Onosai	Samoa	12
3.	Berend Veneberg	Netherlands	9
4.	Anton Boucher	Namibia	7

=== Group 2 ===
Position	Name	Nationality	Points
1.	Gary Taylor	Wales	12.5
2.	Wayne Price	South Africa	11.5
3.	Bernard Rolle	Bahamas	8.5
4.	Stasys Mėčius	Lithuania	7.5

=== Group 3 ===
Position	Name	Nationality	Points
1.	Gerrit Badenhorst	South Africa	15
2.	Heinz Ollesch	Germany	11
3.	Bill Pittuck	England	7
4.	Colin Cox	New Zealand	7

=== Group 4 ===
Position	Name	Nationality	Points
1.	Marko Varalahti	Finland	14
2.	Flemming Rasmussen	Denmark	11
3.	Forbes Cowan	Scotland	11
4.	Curtis Leffler	United States	4

=== Group 5 ===
Position	Name	Nationality	Points
1.	Magnus Samuelsson	Sweden	15
2.	Phil Martin	United States	10
3.	Nathan Jones	Australia	6 (injured)
4.	Torfi Ólafsson	Iceland	2 (injured)

=== Events of the Final ===
- Fire Engine Pull
- Car Rolling
- Flintston Barbell
- Farmer's Walk
- Caber for Height
- Naval Tug of War
- Platform Lift
- Maritime Medley

== Final results ==
#	Name	Nationality	Pts
1	Magnús Ver Magnússon	Iceland	71
2	Gerrit Badenhorst	South Africa	62.5
3	Marko Varalahti	Finland	48.5
4	Heinz Ollesch	Germany	46
5	Flemming Rasmussen	Denmark	42.5
6	Gary Taylor	Wales	42
7	Phil Martin	United States	40
8	Wayne Price	South Africa	38.5
9	Joe Onosai	Samoa	29.5
10	Magnus Samuelsson	Sweden	19.5

Preceded by 1994 World's Strongest Man	1995 World's Strongest Man	Succeeded by 1996 World's Strongest Man
