= Jouko Ahola =

Finnish strength athlete & actor (born 1970)

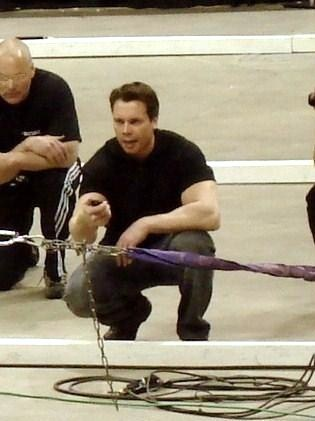
- Jouko Ahola in 2007
- Born: 1 December 1970 (age 55); Hämeenlinna, Finland
- Occupations: Strongman, powerlifter, actor
- Height: 6 ft 1 in (1.85 m)
- Title: 2× World's Strongest Man; 2× Europe's Strongest Man; Finland's Strongest Man
- Website: Official website

Competition record

Strongman

Representing Finland

World's Strongest Man
1st	1997 World's Strongest Man
2nd	1998 World's Strongest Man
1st	1999 World's Strongest Man

World Muscle Power Championships
1st	1998

IFSA
1st	1998 Finland Grand Prix
1st	1999 Germany Grand Prix
1st	1999 Finland Grand Prix
2nd	1999 Czech Grand Prix
2nd	1999 Holland Grand Prix
2nd	1999 Hungary Grand Prix

World's Strongest Viking
4th	1996

World Strongman Challenge
1st	1995
1st	1999

Strongest Man Alive
1st	1998
1st	1999

Europe's Strongest Man
4th	1996
1st	1998
1st	1999

European Hercules
1st	1995
1st	1996
2nd	1997

Atlantic Giants
1st	1999

World's Strongest Team
1st	1997 w/Riku Kiri
2nd	1998 w/Sami Heinonen
1st	1999 w/Janne Virtanen

Finland's Strongest Man
2nd	1996
1st	1997

Powerlifting

Representing Finland

IPF Junior World Championships
5th	1993	125kg

Jouko Ahola (born 1 December 1970) is a Finnish former strongman, powerlifter and actor. He is a two times World's Strongest Man winner, a two times Europe's Strongest Man winner, and a World Muscle Power Classic winner.

With a career 48% international winning percentage with 12 wins, he is also regarded as one of the best pound for pound strongmen in history.

== Strongman ==
=== 1994–1996 ===
Ahola started his career with the 1994 European Hercules competition. The following year he won 1995 World Strongman Challenge in Russia and then 1995 Europe's Strongest Man. He then won 1996 European Hercules and broke two stonelifting world records and another world record in the car walk event, walking a 444 kg (979 lb) car for 27.6 metres.

=== 1997 ===
Ahola started the year by winning 1997 Finland's Strongest Man and placing second in the 1997 European Hercules. He then participated in his first World's Strongest Man competition and won 1997 World's Strongest Man held in Nevada, winning it in his very first appearance. Together with Riku Kiri, Ahola also won the World's Strongest Team competition.

=== 1998 ===
The following year he emerged runner-up to Magnus Samuelsson in 1998 World's Strongest Man but won both 1998 World Muscle Power Classic and 1998 IFSA Helsinki Grand Prix. At the Finnish highland games expo, he broke László Fekete's Atlas Stone (for max) world record by loading a 215 kg (474 lb) stone on top a 3 ft 8 in whiskey barrel. He also established another world record in the Hercules hold event, holding 197 kg (434 lb) in each hand for 45.70 seconds.

=== 1999 ===
The next year, he won 1999 World's Strongest Man becoming a two times champion. To this day, he is one of only ten men to be a repeat champion. He also managed to win 1999 IFSA Finland Grand Prix, 1999 Atlantic Giant, 1999 Beauty and the Beast, and together with Janne Virtanen, won World's Strongest Team again.

His last competition was 2002 IFSA China Grand Prix.

== Personal Records ==
Powerlifting

- Squat – 360 kg (794 lb) raw
- Bench press – 220 kg (485 lb) raw
- Deadlift – 402.5 kg (887 lb) raw

Strongman

- Deadlift (elevated silver dollar setup) – 435 kg (959 lb) (1997 World's Strongest Man)
- Log press – 170 kg (375 lb) (1999 Beauty and the Beast)
- Atlas stones – 5 stones ranging from 120–170 kg (265–375 lb) in 18.60 seconds (1998 Europe's Strongest Man) (former world record)
- Natural stone lift to platform – 5 stones ranging from 91–159 kg (201–351 lb) to tall platforms in 30.43 seconds (1999 Beauty and the Beast) (World Record)
- Crucifix hold – 18 kg (40 lb) for 44.59 seconds (1999 IFSA Finland Grand Prix) (World Record)
- Crucifix hold – 11 kg (24 lb) for 97.53 seconds (1998 Strongest Man Alive) (World Record)

== Acting career ==
After his strongman career, Ahola has directed his focus towards films. So far, his most notable roles have been in Kingdom of Heaven, Bad Day to Go Fishing, War of the Dead and Invincible.

Ahola starred in Werner Herzog's 2001 film Invincible as early 20th century Jewish strongman Zishe Breitbart. Jouko played a former world wrestling champion in Alvaro Brechner's 2009 film Bad day to go fishing, (Mal día para pescar). The film premiered at Cannes Film Festival.

Jouko appeared in the music video for Robin's "Faija skitsoo" in 2012. He also made a cameo appearance on the second season of The Dudesons TV series, which aired worldwide in 2008.

Jouko also serves as a judge and event organizer for the World's Strongest Man contest.

In 2013 he appears in the new History Channel series Vikings.

== Filmography ==
Year	Title	Role	Notes
2001	Invincible	Zishe Breitbart	
2005	Kingdom of Heaven	Odo	
2006	7 miljonärer	Jerry	
2009	Bad Day to Go Fishing	Jacob van Oppen	
2011	War of the Dead	Captain Niemi	
2012	Basement Perspective		Short
2013	Vikings	Kauko	3 episodes
2013	Ella ja kaverit 2 - Paterock	Paten turvamies	
2015	Wendyeffekten	Yeton	
2018	Veljeni vartija	Oululainen portsari #3	

== Miscellaneous ==
- He regards Arnold Schwarzenegger as his role model.
- His nickname is "Jokke."
- His name is often misspelled as Juoko Ahola, Finnish for "Does Ahola drink?"
