= 1998 World's Strongest Man =

Strongman competition in 1998

Competition information
- Dates: 8-18 October 1998
- Location: Tangier
- Country: Morocco
- Athletes participating: 40
- Nations participating: 23

Champion(s)
- (Sweden) Magnus Samuelsson

The 1998 World's Strongest Man was the 21st edition of World's Strongest Man and was won by Magnus Samuelsson from Sweden. It was his first title after finishing third the previous year. 1997 champion Jouko Ahola from Finland finished second, and Wout Zijlstra from the Netherlands finished third. This year had 10 qualifying heats with the winner of each heat going on to the finals. Half the field were injured during the finals of the contest, as well as several heat winners prior to the finals such as Flemming Rasmussen and Gerrit Badenhorst. The contest was held in Tangier/Tétouan, Morocco.

== Heats ==
=== Group 1 ===
Position	Name	Nationality	Points
1.	Riku Kiri	Finland	14.5
2.	Torben Sorrenson	Denmark	11
3.	Jaromir Nemec	Czech Republic	8
4.	Ralph Williams	United States	4.5 (injured)

=== Group 2 ===
Position	Name	Nationality	Points
1.	Flemming Rasmussen	Denmark	14 (injured)
2.	Russ Bradley	England	10
2.	Martin Muhr	Germany	10
4.	Ginaud Dupuis	Canada	6

=== Group 3 ===
Position	Name	Nationality	Points
1.	Pieter de Bruyn	South Africa	13
2.	Heinz Ollesch	Germany	13
3.	Glenn Ross	Northern Ireland	9
4.	Terry Brennan	United States	5

=== Group 4 ===
Position	Name	Nationality	Points
1.	Wout Zijlstra	Netherlands	14
2.	Derek Boyer	Fiji	12
3.	Kurt Kvikkstad	Norway	7
3.	Fraser Tranter	England	7

=== Group 5 ===
Position	Name	Nationality	Points
1.	Gerrit Badenhorst	South Africa	14 (injured)
2.	Lee Bowers	England	10.5
3.	Ralf Ber	Austria	10.5
4.	Gustavo Pujadas	Spain	5

=== Group 6 ===
Position	Name	Nationality	Points
1.	Magnus Samuelsson	Sweden	15
2.	Jamie Barr	Scotland	10.5
3.	Wayne Price	South Africa	10
4.	Michael Abdullah	Japan	4.5

=== Group 7 ===
Position	Name	Nationality	Points
1.	Berend Veneberg	Netherlands	13
2.	László Fekete	Hungary	11
3.	Žydrūnas Savickas	Lithuania	9
4.	Ken Brown	United States	7

=== Group 8 ===
Position	Name	Nationality	Points
1.	Torfi Ólafsson	Iceland	13
2.	Janne Virtanen	Finland	13
3.	Phil Pfister	United States	10
4.	Alexander Matveev	Russia	0 (injured)

=== Group 9 ===
Position	Name	Nationality	Points
1.	Mark Philippi	United States	16
2.	Evgeny Popov	Bulgaria	11
3.	Bill Lyndon	Australia	9
4.	Vladimir Turchinsky	Russia	4

=== Group 10 ===
Position	Name	Nationality	Points
1.	Jouko Ahola	Finland	15
2.	Hugo Girard	Canada	12
3.	Stuart Murray	Scotland	7
4.	Gunnar Thor	Iceland	6

=== Events of the final ===
- Farmer's walk
- Truck pull
- Husafel stone
- Car rolling
- Power stairs
- Log lift
- Car circle
- Medley

== Final results ==
#	Name	Nationality	Pts
1	Magnus Samuelsson	Sweden	73
2	Jouko Ahola	Finland	67
3	Wout Zijlstra	Netherlands	62
4	Phil Pfister	United States	51
5	Pieter de Bruyn	South Africa	46
6	Riku Kiri	Finland	26 (injured)
7	Torfi Olafsson	Iceland	19 (injured)
8	Mark Philippi	United States	18 (injured)
9	Berend Veneberg	Netherlands	9 (injured)
10	Hugo Girard	Canada	5 (injured)

Preceded by 1997 World's Strongest Man	1998 World's Strongest Man	Succeeded by 1999 World's Strongest Man
