= Marko Varalahti =

Personal information
- Born: Finland
- Occupation: Strongman
- Height: 201 cm (6 ft 7 in)
- Weight: 140 kg (309 lb)
Medal record
Strongman
Representing Finland
World's Strongest Man
3rd	1995 World's Strongest Man
Finland's Strongest Man
3rd	1992
2nd	1993
1st	1995
3rd	1996

Marko Varalahti is a former strongman competitor from Finland who is best known for competing in the 1995 World's Strongest Man competition, finishing in 3rd place. Varalahti also won Finland's Strongest Man in 1995.

== Honours ==
- Finland's Strongest Man (1995)
- 3rd place World's Strongest Man (1995)
