= Phil Martin (highland games) =

American strongman (born 1964)

Personal information
- Born: Phil Martin; October 27, 1964 (age 61) United States
- Occupations: Highland games, Strongman
- Height: 6 ft 5 in (1.96 m)
Medal record
Strongman
Representing United States
World's Strongest Man
7th	1995 World's Strongest Man
Qualified	1996 World's Strongest Man
America's Strongest Man
4th	1997

Phil Martin (born October 27, 1964) is a former professional strongman and highland games competitor who is best known for competing in the finals of the 1995 World's Strongest Man contest in Nassau, Bahamas.

Nicknamed "Stonehenge", Martin also competed professionally in Highland Games and works in construction.

== Personal records ==
- Caber over bar – 32 kg (71 lb) over 6.20 metres (20 ft 4 in) (1995 World Muscle Power Classic) (World Record)
