= Magnus Samuelsson =

Swedish strongman (born 1969)

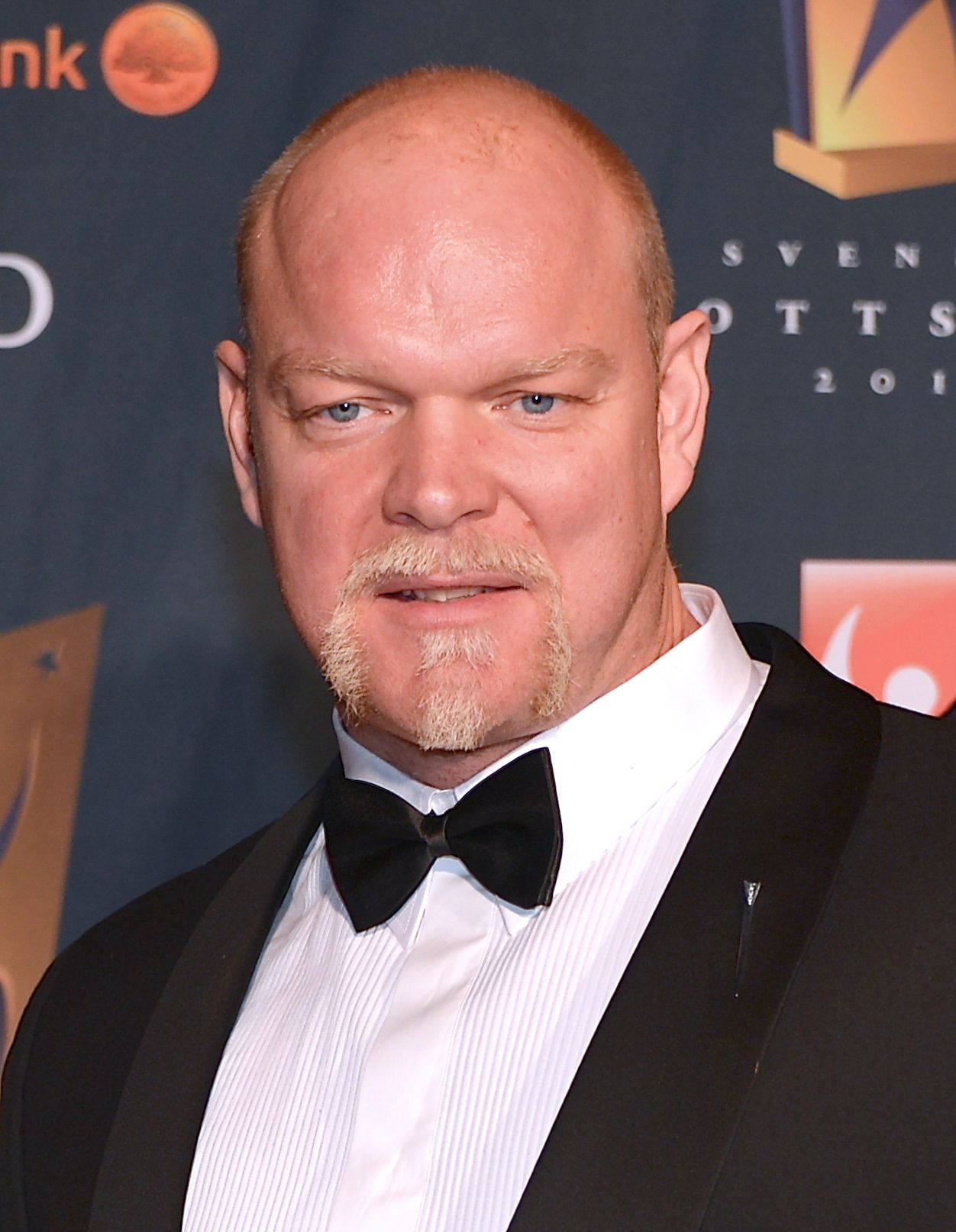

Personal information
- Nationality: Swedish
- Born: Karl Magnus Samuelsson; December 21, 1969 (age 56) Linköping, Östergötland, Sweden
- Occupations: Strongman, Armwrestling, Actor
- Years active: 1995–2008
- Height: 201 cm (6 ft 7 in)
- Weight: 148–154 kg (326–340 lb)
- Spouse: Kristin Samuelsson
- Children: David Samuelsson; Sara Samuelsson
- Relative: Brother – Torbjörn Samuelsson
Medal record
Strongman
Representing Sweden
World's Strongest Man
10th	1995 World's Strongest Man
Qualified	1996 World's Strongest Man
3rd	1997 World's Strongest Man
1st	1998 World's Strongest Man
5th	1999 World's Strongest Man
3rd	2000 World's Strongest Man
2nd	2001 World's Strongest Man
10th	2002 World's Strongest Man
4th	2003 World's Strongest Man
3rd	2004 World's Strongest Man
Qualified	2006 World's Strongest Man
5th	2007 World's Strongest Man
Qualified	2008 World's Strongest Man
World Muscle Power Championships
3rd	2001
2nd	1996
Europe's Strongest Man
2nd	2000
3rd	2001
Strongman Super Series
2nd	2001 Holland Grand Prix
3rd	2001 Czech Grand Prix
1st	2001 Sweden Grand Prix
1st	2001 Overall Champion
1st	2004 Sweden Grand Prix
3rd	2004/05 Overall
1st	2008 Sweden Super Series
Arnold Strongman Classic
10th	2005 Arnold Strongman Classic
World Strongman Challenge
1st	1998
2nd	1999
2nd	2001
European Open
3rd	1997
Helsinki Grand Prix
2nd	1998
2nd	2000
Sweden's Strongest Man
1st	1995
1st	1996
1st	1997
1st	1999
1st	2000
1st	2001
1st	2003
1st	2004
1st	2005

Magnus Samuelsson (born December 21, 1969), is a Swedish former strongman, arm wrestler and actor. The winner of the 1998 World's Strongest Man, he made it to the World's Strongest Man podium 5 times and the finals 10 times. He also won Sweden's Strongest Man a record nine times.

Being called the 'king of the stones' due to his prowess in stonelifting, he was also renowned for having the world's strongest arms and hands. Throughout his career, he won 13 international competitions and set 18 world records, and is regarded as one of the greatest strongmen in history.

== Early life ==
Samuelsson grew up in a cattle farm in Lineberry where manual labour at a young age with activities such as moving hay and cattle feed, picking up stones on the fields and chopping timber in the forest, gave him formidable physical strength. Being the son of a former Swedish arm wrestling champion, he was ranked among the best arm wrestlers in Europe during early to mid 90's with a second place in 1993 at the European championships as his best performance.

== Career ==
Samuelsson's strongman career started with winning 1995 Sweden's Strongest Man. It qualified him for 1995 World's Strongest Man in Bahamas where he made it to the finals but only managed a tenth-place finish. In 1996, he won the national title for the second time and won second place in 1996 World Muscle Power Classic behind Forbes Cowan.

At 1997 World's Strongest Man in Nevada, USA he secured his first of five podium finishes of the competition, by placing third behind Jouko Ahola and Flemming Rasmussen. He also secured fifth-place finishes in 1997 Europe's Strongest Man and World Strongman Challenge and won his third national title.

At 1998 World's Strongest Man in Morocco he emerged victorious, becoming the eleventh man to win the title. Jouko Ahola won second and Wout Zijlstra emerged third. He scored 73 points in the final and won four events and came second in another two. Samuelsson also won 1998 World Strongman Challenge and Atlantic Giant. At the 1998 IFSA Helsinki Grand Prix he managed a fourth-place finish and at 1998 IFSA German Grand Prix he managed a fifth-place finish. He did not participate at the Sweden's Strongest Man hence his brother Torbjörn Samuelsson won the title for the first time.

At 1999 World's Strongest Man in Malta he dropped to a fifth-place finish, but won the 1999 IFSA Czech Grand Prix. He also won second at 1999 Viking of the North, 1999 Beauty and the Beast and third at 1999 Atlantic Giant. He also won his fourth Sweden's Strongest Man title.

2000 was another prolific year for him with four wins in 2000 IFSA Grand Prix competition in Ireland, Poland, Romania and China. He also secured second place in 2000 Europe's Strongest Man, IFSA Finland Grand Prix and came third at 2000 World's Strongest Man in South Africa securing his third podium finish. He also came third in 2000 Atlantic Giant and won his fifth national title.

In 2001, Samuelsson became the overall champion of the Strongman Super Series. He also emerged second at 2001 World's Strongest Man held in Zambia behind his good friend Svend Karlsen. He also secured second at Holland Grand Prix and emerged third at Europe's Strongest Man, World Muscle Power Classic and Czech Grand Prix. In 2002 World's Strongest Man in Malaysia he injured himself in the squat event and had to withdraw.

In 2003 World's Strongest Man in Zambia he placed fourth and couldn't win a single competition other than the national title. He placed third at World Muscle Power Classic. In 2004 he won the Sweden Grand Prix beating Žydrūnas Savickas and Svend Karlsen.

After competing in the 2005 IFSA Strongman World Championship in 2005 and winning his ninth Sweden's Strongest Man title, he returned to compete in the 2006 World's Strongest Man but failed to make it past the qualifying rounds due to a back injury. A year later, he reached the 2007 World's Strongest Man finals, eventually finishing in 5th place. However, after failing to make the finals in the 2008 World's Strongest Man contest, Samuelsson announced his retirement from competition after 14 years competing in the sport. He held the record for reaching the World's Strongest Man finals ten times, achieving a podium on five occasions. With 31 career podium finishes Samuelsson finished as one of the all-time most successful strongman competitors.

=== Breaking the arm of Nathan Jones ===
In 1995, Samuelsson accidentally broke the arm of Australian wrestler Nathan Jones during heats of the 1995 World's Strongest Man. The injury occurred because Jones employed the novice technique of side twisting. The action combined with Samuelsson's own body strength resulted in a snapped humerus.

=== The World's Strongest Arms ===
Samuelsson is especially noted for his exceptional arm and grip strength. In the 2003 documentary 'The World's Strongest Arms', together with fellow World's Strongest Man champion Svend Karlsen, Samuelsson demonstrated world class feats of strength such as performing bicep curls with 140 kg (310 lb) for 4 repetitions, bench pressing 270 kg (600 lb) for 2 repetitions, unofficially surpassing Andrus Murumets 121.1 kg (267 lb) Rolling Thunder world record, three times with lifts of 123.9, 126.1 and 129.6 kg (273, 278 and 286 lb) and unofficially becoming the first man in history to close the IronMind Captains of Crush No. 4 gripper (165.5 kg (365 lb)/ RGC 213 of pressure) for two reps. Following year, Samuelsson officially closed the legendary gripper under official conditions and to this date remains one of only six men to do so.

== Personal records ==
=== In competitions ===
- Deadlift – 330 kg (728 lb) (2001 World's Strongest Man - Group 3)
- Squat – 300 kg (661 lb) (1997 World's Strongest Man)
- Log press – 165 kg (364 lb) (1999 Beauty and the Beast)
- Axle press – 160 kg (353 lb) (2001 Beauty and the Beast)
- Machine Bench press – 200 kg (441 lb) x 15 reps (2004 Strongman Super Series Sweden Grand Prix) (Joint-World Record)
- Atlas Stones – 100–160 kg (220–353 lb) (5 stones) on tall platforms in 21.09 seconds (2007 World's Strongest Man, group 5) (World Record)
- Atlas Stones – 120–180 kg (265–397 lb) (5 stones) in 27.13 seconds (2000 Europe's Strongest Man)
- Replica Húsafell stone I – 163 kg (359 lb) (87% of the original) for 89.68 metres (1997 World's Strongest Man) (World Record)
- Replica Húsafell stone II – 173 kg (381 lb) (93% of the original) for 79.71 metres (1998 World's Strongest Man) (World Record)
- Faroe-kviahellan – 180 kg (397 lb) for 30 metres in 16.88 seconds (2000 Atlantic Giant) (World Record)
- Hercules hold (car setup) – 300 kg (661 lb) for 47.91 seconds (1999 Beauty and the Beast) (World Record)
- Front hold – 30 kg (66 lb) for 73.63 seconds (2000 IFSA Grand Prix Ireland)
- Crucifix hold – 20 kg (44 lb) for 43.45 seconds (2007 Strongman Super Series Viking Power Challenge) (World Record)
- Farmers hold (with straps) – 204 kg (450 lb) in each hand for 35.33 seconds (1998 IFSA Faroe Islands Grand Prix) (World Record)
- Medicine ball toss – 23 kg (51 lb) over 5.18 metres (2005 Arnold's Strongest Man) (Joint-World Record)
- Car flip – 907 kg (2,000 lb) x 2 times in 24.75 seconds (1998 World's Strongest Man) (World Record)
- Car flip – 650 kg (1,433 lb) x 2 times in 16.20 seconds (1997 World's Strongest Man) (World Record)
- Tyre flip – 520 kg (1,146 lb) x 5 times in 31.47 seconds (2004 Sweden Grand Prix)
- Duck walk – 200 kg (441 lb) for 40m course (3 turns) in 17.91 seconds (1999 Europe's Strongest Man) (World Record)
- Duck walk – 200 kg (441 lb) for 30m course (2 turns) in 15.84 seconds (1998 IFSA Faroe Islands Grand Prix) (World Record)
- Conan's Wheel – 300 kg (661 lb) for 1022° (2004 Sweden Grand Prix)
- Back lift – 1,190 kg (2,624 lb) (2004 World Muscle Power Classic)
- Arm over arm vertical lift (wood hoist) – 227 kg (500 lb) for 6m height in 31.18 seconds (2004 World Muscle Power Classic) (World Record)
- Arm over arm uphill boat pull – 300 kg (661 lb) for 20m course in 31.62 seconds (1999 World's Strongest Man) (World Record)
- Arm over arm car pull – 6,000 kg (13,228 lb) for 30m course in 52.01 seconds (2008 Strongman Super Series Sweden Grand Prix) (World Record)
- Truck pull (no harness/ rope only) – 8,000 kg (17,637 lb) for 25 meter course 'in sand' in 23.31 seconds (1999 IFSA Czech Grand Prix) (World Record)

=== In training ===
- Bench press – 300 kg (661 lb) raw, 270 kg (595 lb) for 2 reps raw
- Deadlift – 385 kg (849 lb) raw
- Squat – 280 kg (617 lb) for 10 reps raw
- Barbell curl – 140 kg (309 lb) for 4 reps
- Atlas Stone loading – 200 kg (441 lb) to 4 ft 11 in (59 in) platform (unofficial world record)
- Atlas Stone overhead press – 140 kg (309 lb) (unofficial world record)
- IronMind Rolling Thunder (V1) – 129.6 kg (285.7 lb) (former unofficial world record)

→ Samuelsson also officially held the world record when he pulled 118.8 kg (261.9 lb) at 2003 IFSA/GNC Pro Performance Strongman Challenge

- IronMind Captains of Crush – No. 4 gripper (165.5 kg/ 365 lb, RGC 213) for 2 reps (first person to do this feat)

→ Samuelsson also officially closed it in 2004 becoming the fifth man to get the COC#4 certification

- Inch Dumbbell one hand (thumbless grip) lift – 78 kg (172 lb) with a 2 3/8 inches (6.0 cm) diameter handle (first person to do it)

== Contest history ==
- 1996 World Muscle Power - 2nd
- 1997 Glasgow Open - 1st
- 1998 Helsinki Strongman - 4th
- 1998 World Strongest Team Contest - 3rd
- 1998 Faroe GP - 1st
- 1998 World Strongman Challenge - 1st
- 1999 Faroe GP - 3rd
- 1999 Beauty and the Beast - 1st
- 1999 Iceland Viking of the North - 2nd
- 1999 World Strongest Team - 2nd
- 1999 Helsinki GP - 4th
- 1999 Czech GP - 1st
- 2000 Faroe GP - 3rd
- 2000 Ireland GP - 1st
- 2000 Europe Strongman Classic - 2nd
- 2000 Helsinki GP - 2nd
- 2000 Poland GP - 1st
- 2000 China GP - 1st
- 2000 Romanian GP - 1st
- 2001 Beauty and the Beast - 1st
- 2001 World Muscle Power - 2nd
- 2001 Europe's Strongest Man - 3rd
- 2001 Santo Domingo - 2nd
- 2001 Prague GP - 3rd
- 2001 Dutch GP - 2nd
- 2001 Stockholm GP - 1st
- 2001 Strongman Super Series - 1st
- 2003 World Muscle Power Canada - 3rd
- 2003 World Record Breakers Poland - 3rd
- 2004 World Strongman Stars Ukraine - 2nd
- 2004 Superseries GP Gothenburg - 1st
- 2007 Viking Power Super Series Norway - 3rd
- 2008 Sweden Super Series Sweden - 1st

== Media ==
Magnus Samuelsson was offered a role in the film Gladiator, but declined. One of the reasons he declined was that he believed the film was going to be a B movie. The agent who had phoned him to offer the role had told him that he would "fight with swords and so", and also named a couple of actors in the cast, which Magnus Samuelsson did not recognize.

In 2009 Samuelsson won the Swedish version of the television series Dancing with the Stars, beating songwriter Laila Bagge in the final.

Samuelsson plays Gunnar Nyberg, a detective in the 2011 Swedish crime thriller series Arne Dahl. It has also been aired in Germany and UK. The series are now available on Amazon Prime.

Samuelsson plays Clapa in the BBC's The Last Kingdom. A hulking Danish warrior, Clapa becomes one of the main protagonist Uhtred's best fighters, but his savagery in battle belies a warm heart and loyalty to his comrades that holds no bounds.

== Personal life ==
Samuelsson lives in Tidersrum in Östergötland. He and his brother, Torbjörn, are both full-time farmers. Throughout his career, he has been supported at every competition by his wife Kristin, a former two-time winner of Sweden's strongest woman. They have one son, David, and one daughter, Sara.

Samuelsson is also a Muscle car lover and an automobile racing enthusiast. In 2010 he competed in Rally Sweden, part of the World Rally Championship, finishing in 35th position out of 55.

Preceded by Jouko Ahola	World's Strongest Man; 1998	Succeeded by Jouko Ahola
Preceded by Tina Nordström & Tobias Karlsson'	Let's Dance Winner; Season 4 (2009 with Annika Sjöö)	Succeeded by TBA
