= Gary Taylor (strongman) =

British strength athlete (born 1961)

Personal information
- Born: 14 October 1961 (age 64) Cardiff, Wales
- Occupations: Strongman, Olympic Weightlifting, Bodybuilding, Powerlifting
- Height: 183 cm (6 ft 0 in)
- Children: Evan Taylor
Medal record
Strongman
Representing United Kingdom
World's Strongest Man
3rd	1991 World's Strongest Man
5th	1992 World's Strongest Man
1st	1993 World's Strongest Man
Qualified	1994 World's Strongest Man
6th	1995 World's Strongest Man
World Muscle Power Championships
3rd	1995
World Strongman Challenge
3rd	1991
3rd	1992
3rd	1994
World's Strongest Team
1st	1995 w/Jamie Reeves & Forbes Cowan
World Mighty Man
2nd	1992
4th	1993
Representing Wales
Europe's Strongest Man
1st	1991 tie w/Forbes Cowan
Other Grand Prix & Internationals
2nd	Callander Grand Prix (Scotland) 1994
1st	Lithuania Grand Prix (IFSA) 1995
2nd	Manfred Hoeberl Classic 1995
Britain's Strongest Man
1st	1991
3rd	1997
British Muscle Power Championship
1st	1995
Wales' Strongest Man
1st	1989
1st	1990
1st	1991
2nd	1992
1st	1993
1st	1994
1st	1995
1st	1996
1st	1997

Gary Taylor (born 14 October 1961) is a British former Strongman, Weightlifter, Powerlifter and Bodybuilder.

He won the World's Strongest Man competition in 1993.

== Career ==
Taylor was inspired to lift weights at a young age after he saw a bodybuilding magazine and joined a local sports club. With three months of training he won the Welsh Junior Championships in Weightlifting. At the age of 21, he represented Wales at the 1982 Commonwealth games and placed sixth. At 1984 Summer Olympics in Los Angeles he snatched 170 kg (375 lb) in the 110 kg class which placed him second going into the clean and jerk, but unfortunately he failed all three of his attempts.

During mid 80s, Taylor focused more on bodybuilding and placed fifth at the 1987 Mr. Universe competition. During 1988 IFBB British Championships he emerged runner-up to future Mr. Olympia Dorian Yates.

Taylor won 1989 Welsh Powerlifting Championships. A year later he squatted 355 kg (783 lb), bench pressed 220 kg (485 lb) and deadlifted 315 kg (694 lb) for a total of 890 kg (1,962 lb) at 1990 British Powerlifting Championships.

In 1989 he participated in his first strongman competition locally and won the inaugural Wales' Strongest Man competition. He later won this title for a total of eight times. After placing eighth at 1990 World Muscle Power Classic, he shared first place with Forbes Cowan at 1991 Europe's Strongest Man and emerged second at 1991 World Viking Challenge. In his inaugural World's Strongest Man in 1991 he placed third behind Magnús Ver Magnússon and Henning Thorsen. After placing second at 1992 World Mighty Man, he dropped to fifth at the 1992 World's Strongest Man.

The following year, Taylor won 1993 World's Strongest Man in Orange, France becoming the first Welshman and the third Brit to win the title. at 6 ft (183 cm) tall, he is the shortest World's Strongest Man winner in history.

Among his lifts, Taylor was noted for his behind-the-neck push press. During 1995 World Muscle Power Classic he lifted 225 kg (496 lb) in the behind the neck Flintstone barbell push press event for a world record which remained unbeaten for 27 years. During a bodybuilding exhibition in 1994, he behind the neck push pressed 267 kg (589 lb) for an unofficial world record.

Taylor suffered knee injury during the tire flip event at the 1997 Europe's Strongest Man contest. The injury was so severe that it forced him to retire from strongman permanently.

== Personal records ==
Weightlifting

- Snatch – 187 kg (412 lb)
- Clean and jerk – 217.5 kg (480 lb)

Powerlifting

- Squat (raw with wraps) – 385 kg (849 lb) x 2 reps
- Deadlift (raw) – 355 kg (783 lb)
- Deadlift (raw with straps) – 320 kg (705 lb) x 8 reps

Strongman

- Flintstone barbell push press (behind the neck) – 225 kg (496 lb) (1995 World Muscle Power Classic) (former world record)

→ Taylor has also behind the neck push pressed 267 kg (589 lb) during an exhibition in 1994 for an unofficial world record. Despite claims from several sources which cites he has done 270 kg (595 lb) and 272 kg (600 lb), Taylor confirmed in an interview in 2020 that 267 kg (589 lb) was his best.

- Log press – 160 kg (353 lb) (1993 World's Strongest Man, group 1)
- Smith machine Squat (partial lift not to parallel depth) – 407.5 kg (898 lb) (1995 World's Strongest Man)
- Atlas stones – 5 stones weighing 90–136 kg (198–300 lb) (no tacky) in 17.19 seconds (1993 World's Strongest Man) (World Record)
- Samson's barrow carry – 10 humans (25m course) in 12.55 seconds (1993 World's Strongest Man) (World Record)
- Keg toss – 25 kg (55 lb) over 5.10 metres (16 ft 9 in) (1995 Manfred Hoeberl Classic) (former world record)
- Weight over bar – 25.5 kg (56 lb) over 4.70 metres (15 ft 5 in) (1991 World Viking Challenge)
- Scottish hammer throw – 15 kg (33 lb) super-heavy hammer for 24.62 metres (80 ft 9 in) (1991 World Viking Challenge)

== Retirement/later years ==
Taylor, now retired from competition, worked within the PE department (he was a senior officer) at Aylesbury Young Offenders Institute, a prison for Category A (highest and most considered dangerous), as well as being the Senior Gym Officer and rugby coach for Ampthill youth rugby team. He moved to Littlehey Prison Cat-C/YOI as a Security Governor. Gary currently does commentating and event organizing for the annual UK's Strongest Man contest.

== World's Strongest Man results ==
- 1991 World's Strongest Man – 3rd
- 1992 World's Strongest Man – 5th
- 1993 World's Strongest Man – Winner
- 1994 World's Strongest Man – Qualified
- 1995 World's Strongest Man – 6th
