= Gerrit Badenhorst =

South African powerlifter and strongman (born 1962)

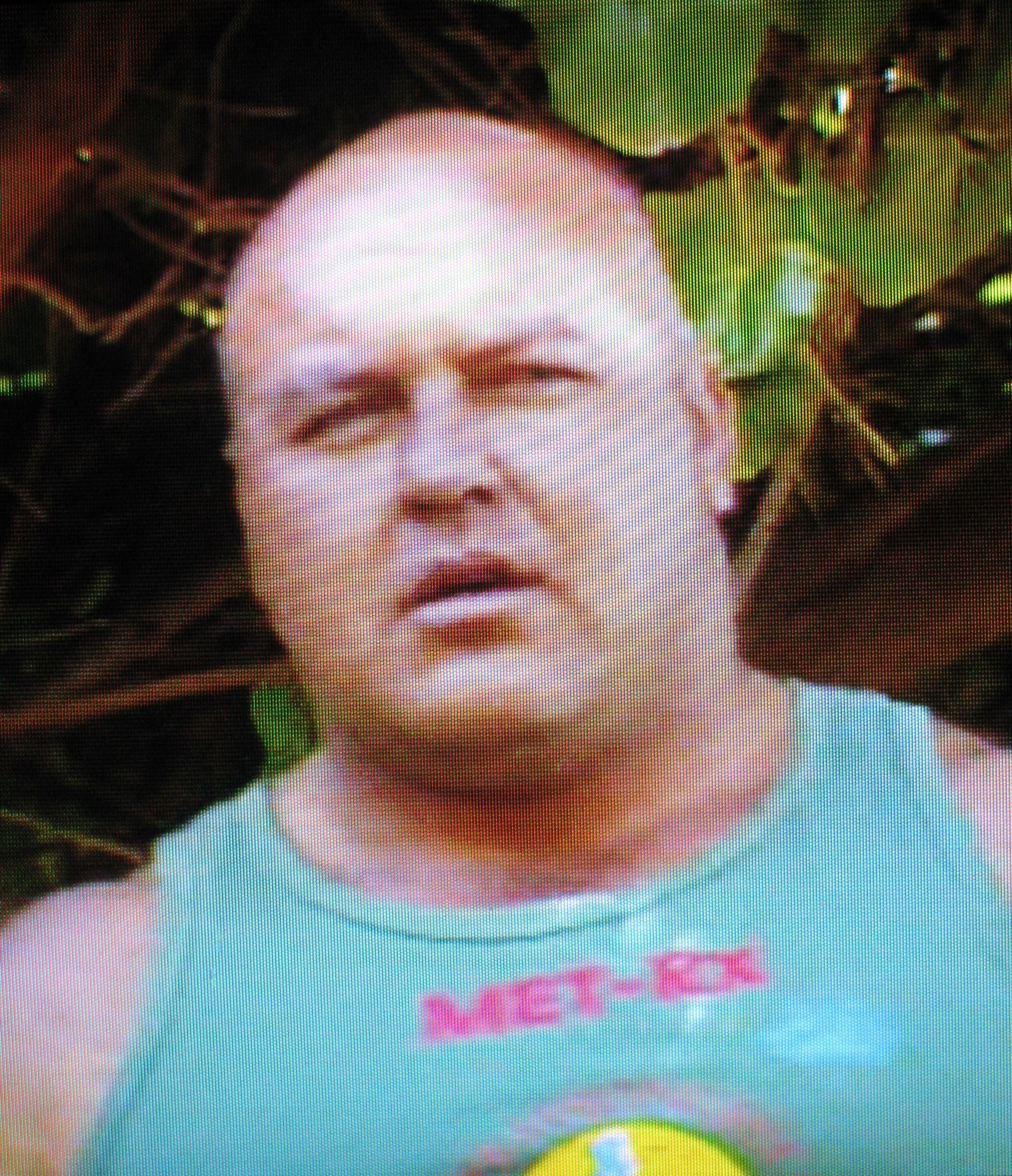

Personal information
- Born: 10 October 1962 (age 63) De Aar, Northern Cape, South Africa
- Occupations: Strongman, Powerlifting
- Height: 185 cm (6 ft 1 in)
- Weight: 145 kg (320 lb)
- Spouse: Janka
- Children: Gerrit Badenhorst; Franciska Badenhorst

Sport
- Partner: strudle
Medal record
Strongman
Representing South Africa
World's Strongest Man
4th	1992 World's Strongest Man
8th	1993 World's Strongest Man
4th	1994 World's Strongest Man
2nd	1995 World's Strongest Man
3rd	1996 World's Strongest Man
Qualified	1997 World's Strongest Man
Qualified	1998 World's Strongest Man
Qualified	1999 World's Strongest Man
7th	2000 World's Strongest Man
IFSA Grand Prix's
2nd	1997 IFSA European Open
2nd	1999 Hungary Grand Prix
1st	1999 Holland Grand Prix
World Strongman Challenge
1st	1993
World Mighty Man
4th	1992
1st	1993
South Africa's Strongest Man
1st	1989
1st	1990
1st	1992
1st	1993
1st	1994
1st	1995
1st	1998
1st	2001
Powerlifting
Representing South Africa
WPC World Powerlifting Championships
1st	1988	+125kg
1st	1989	+125kg
1st	1990	+125kg

Gerrit Badenhorst (born 10 October 1962) is a South African former powerlifter and strongman. Badenhorst was WPC world champion and a runner-up at the World's Strongest Man competition. He also won World Strongman Challenge, World Mighty Man and South Africa's Strongest Man eight times in the national circuit.

Some strength analysts and historians regard Badenhorst as the best athlete to have never won World's Strongest Man title.

== Powerlifting ==
Badenhorst was born on 10 October 1962 in De Aar, Northern Cape, South Africa. As a sportsman he played rugby union, but excelled in the sports of weightlifting and powerlifting.

Before Badenhorst competed for South Africa internationally on the strongman stage, he first represented his country as a powerlifter. Between 1988 and 1990, Badenhorst won three world titles in the World Powerlifting Congress organization. In so doing, he broke world records in the squat at 450 kilograms (990 lb), and the deadlift at 402.5 kg (887.4 lb). He also broke the world record in the total (squat+bench press+deadlift) of 1102.5 kg (2431 lb).

At first, his world titles and world records led to him being acclaimed the greatest ever powerlifter at the time, with his totals having beaten the likes of Lars Noren, Don Reinhoudt and Bill Kazmaier. However Kazmaier, Noren and Rienhound had not utilized bench shirts when posting their totals. Lars Noren Posted his 1077.5 kg total in the 1987 IPF World Championship, which was drug tested. Having reached the pinnacle of the sport of powerlifting, a lack of financial incentive led him to strongman competitions.

== Strongman ==
Badenhorst was eight times South Africa's Strongest Man. Badenhorst was also a seven time World's Strongest Man finalist, coming second at the 1995 World's Strongest Man and third at the 1996 World's Strongest Man where he established the inaugural strongman deadlift world record from the standard 9 inch height with 410 kg (904 lb).

In strength athletics Badenhorst had already made an impact in South Africa having been crowned South Africa's Strongest Man in 1989, 1990 and 1992. At the 1992 World's Strongest Man as a newcomer he placed fourth. In 1993 he won the highly regarded World Strongman Challenge and entered the 1993 World's Strongest Man contest as one of the favourites but had to retire due to an injury in the Pole Push.

At the 1994 World's Strongest Man he again came fourth. Determined to improve, and having won South Africa's Strongest Man once again, he entered the 1995 World's Strongest Man as one of the favourites. Despite an injury sustained in the Bavarian stone lift during the qualifying heats, he came second overall to Magnus Ver Magnusson in the finals. He competed in a further five World's Strongest Man contests, coming third in 1996, and 7th in 2000. Badenhorst won his heat at the 1998 World's Strongest Man and qualified for the final, but sustained an injury and was unable to compete.

== Personal records ==
Powerlifting

- Squat – 450 kg (992 lb) single ply squat suit, with knee wraps (1990 WPC World Championships) (former WPC world record in 140 kg (309 lb) class)
- Bench Press – 250 kg (551 lb) single ply shirt (1990 WPC World Championships)
- Deadlift – 402.5 kg (887 lb) raw (1990 WPC World Championships) (former WPC world record in 140 kg (309 lb) class)
- Total – 1,102.5 kg (2,431 lb) single ply except for the deadlift (1990 WPC World Championships, Italy)

Strongman

- Flintstone Deadlift – 410 kg (904 lb) raw with straps (1996 World's Strongest Man) (former strongman world record)
- Block press – 150 kg (331 lb) (1998 IFSA Grand Prix Hungary) (former world record)

→ First man in history to block press 150 kg (331 lb)

- Power stairs (3 x 180 kg (397 lb) duck walks / total of 15 steps) – 21.37 seconds (1993 World Strongman Challenge) (World Record)
- Car flip – 700 kg (1,543 lb) x 1 time in 11.51 seconds (1996 World's Strongest Man) (World Record)
- Keg toss – 12.5 kg (28 lb) over 6.10 metres (20 ft 0 in) (1999 IFSA Hungary Grand Prix)
- Keg toss – 20 kg (44 lb) over 5.00 metres (16 ft 5 in) (1997 European Open)

== Personal life ==
Badenhorst is married to Olivia, and loves to spend his time with his two Yorkshire Terriers in the outdoors.

== Honours ==
- 8 times South Africa's Strongest Man (1989, 1990, 1992–1995, 1998 and 2001)
- 4th place 1992 World's Strongest Man
- 8th place (withdrew due to injury) 1993 World's Strongest Man
- 4th place 1994 World's Strongest Man
- 2nd place 1995 World's Strongest Man
- 3rd place 1996 World's Strongest Man
- 7th place 2000 World's Strongest Man
- DNP (qualified for finals, injured during heats) 1998 World's Strongest Man
