= Magnús Ver Magnússon =

Icelandic strongman (born 1963)

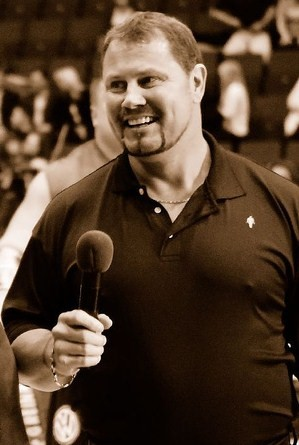
- Magnús in October 2007

Personal information
- Born: 23 April 1963 (age 63) Egilsstaðir, Iceland
- Occupations: Strongman, powerlifter
- Height: 190 cm (6 ft 3 in)
- Spouse: Monica Ver Magnússon
- Children: 2
Medal record
Strongman
Representing Iceland
World's Strongest Man
1st	1991 World's Strongest Man
2nd	1992 World's Strongest Man
2nd	1993 World's Strongest Man
1st	1994 World's Strongest Man
1st	1995 World's Strongest Man
1st	1996 World's Strongest Man
Qualified	1997 World's Strongest Man
World Muscle Power Championships
3rd	1991
2nd	1992
2nd	1994
1st	1995
Le Defi Mark Ten International
2nd	1988
1st	1989
3rd	1990
World Strongman Challenge
2nd	1989
3rd	1990
2nd	1992
2nd	1993
2nd	1996
1st	1997
Europe's Strongest Man
1st	1992
1st	1994
3rd	1996
2nd	1997
2nd	1998
European Hercules
1st	1997
Manfred Hoeberl Classic
1st	1995
Pure Strength
1st	1989 w/Hjalti Árnason
2nd	1990 w/Hjalti Árnason
Iceland's Strongest Man
3rd	1985
3rd	1986
3rd	1987
2nd	1988
1st	1989
1st	1991
1st	1993
1st	1994
1st	1995
1st	1996
1st	2001
1st	2004
Powerlifting
Representing Iceland
EPF European Powerlifting Championships
2nd	1989	125kg
3rd	1990	125kg
1st	1991	125kg
IPF Junior World Championships
3rd	1985	110kg
EPF Junior European Championships
3rd	1985	110kg
3rd	1986	110kg

Magnús Ver Magnússon (born 23 April 1963) is an Icelandic former strongman and powerlifter. He is a four times World's Strongest Man, having won in 1991, 1994, 1995, 1996, a two times Europe's Strongest Man, a World Muscle Power Classic winner and an EPF European powerlifting champion.

In his career, he won 12 international strongman competitions and another 20 national competitions (including the Iceland's Strongest Man eight times) and is regarded as one of the greatest strongmen of all-time.

== Career ==
=== Powerlifting ===
Magnús began powerlifting in 1984. In 1985, he won a medal in the junior European and World Championships. He won the Senior European title in the 125 kg (276 lb) class in 1988 and 1990. His best lifts in competition include a 400 kg (882 lb) squat, 275 kg (606 lb) bench press, 370.5 kg (817 lb) deadlift, and a total of 1015.5 kg (2239 lb) all with single ply equipment.

=== Strongman ===
Magnús competed in his first strongman contest in 1985, finishing third in the Iceland's Strongest Man competition won by Jón Páll Sigmarsson. He decided to focus solely on strongman competition after he won the 1991 World's Strongest Man contest. His strongman victories include the 1989 Pure Strength team contest in Scotland with Hjalti Árnason, the 1991 and 1993 International Power Challenge, the 1992 Scandinavian Strongest Man (Finland), the 1992 Nordic Strongest Man (Denmark), the 1994 Europe's Strongest Man, the 1995 World Muscle Power Championship, and the 1995 and 1997 Viking Challenges.

In addition to his four World's Strongest Man titles, Magnús was also runner-up in 1992 and 1993. He has also won the Iceland's strongest man competition eight times and The Westfjords Vikings (Vestfjarðavíkingurinn) of Iceland nine times. He carried Jón Páll's formula of being athletic for the dynamic tests of strength and having tremendous static strength to outlift some of the best powerlifters. He was able to easily out-deadlift the favoured O.D. Wilson by 40 kg in 1991 and out-squatted the world record holder in the squat, Gerrit Badenhorst, in 1995. After Magnus squatted 437.5 kg in a Smith machine setup, Badenhorst commented that he had previously underestimated Magnús' pure strength and that Magnús' squat was the greatest squat he had ever seen from someone of his bodyweight.

He competed in a one-off event at the Giants Live Strongman Championship 2019 held in Wembley Stadium, England against fellow strongman legend Bill Kazmaier in the Hercules Hold, with the weight being reduced by 20 kg on each side from what the professional athletes were working with. Despite having not competed in a strongman event since 2005, Magnús stunned the crowd with a time of 101.2 seconds (1m 41.2s), whilst Kazmaier could only manage just over 18 seconds.

=== Other ===
Magnús frequently judges international powerlifting and strongman competitions and owns a powerlifting and strongman gym in Kópavogur called Jakaból (Nest of Giants). Magnus still trains in his gym regularly. Magnus also organizes different strongman competitions in Iceland, including Strongest Man in Iceland (Sterkasti maður á Íslandi) and Iceland's Strongest Viking ("Víkingurinn").

Magnús is the founder of the Magnús Ver Magnússon Strongman Classic, a strongman competition held in Iceland.

More recently he has launched the Magnús Ver Magnússon Adaptive Strength World Championships where adaptive athletes can compete for the title of World's Strongest Adaptive Man and World's Strongest Adaptive Woman. This will be held as part of the Official Strongman Games (OSG) in 2025. Magnús is also a brand ambassador of HEMPE pain gels which he says help him to recover faster after training as well as deal with aches/pains that come with being a long time athlete.

In 2008, Magnús made an appearance on Comedy Central's The Daily Show. He also appeared in a Coors Light commercial as the "World's Strongest Man" which aired in the U.S.

Magnús is married and has 2 daughters and a grandson.

== Personal records ==
Strongman

- Smith machine Squat (partial lift not to parallel depth) – 437.5 kg (965 lb) (1995 World's Strongest Man)
- Flintstone Deadlift – 370 kg (816 lb) (1996 World's Strongest Man)
- Silver Dollar Deadlift (18" off the floor) – 430 kg (948 lb) (1994 World's Strongest Man)
- Log press – 160 kg (353 lb) (1995 Strongest Man on Earth)
- Flintstone barbell push press (behind the neck) – 200 kg (441 lb) (1995 World's Strongest Man)
- Atlas stones – 5 stones weighing 90–127 kg (198–280 lb) on distant platforms (no tacky) in 29.00 seconds (1994 World's Strongest Man) (World Record)
- Natural stone lift to platform – 4 rocks ranging from 90–136 kg (198–300 lb) in 17.30 seconds (1992 World Strongman Challenge) (World Record)
- Natural stone press – 136 kg (300 lb) (2005 IFSA Holland Grand Prix)

→ Magnús Ver held the world record when he pressed a 130 kg (287 lb) stone at 1992 World's Strongest Man. He again pressed the same weight at 1994 World's Strongest Man, however by this time the world record was held by Gerrit Badenhorst with 135 kg (298 lb).

- Húsafell Stone carry (around the pen) – 186 kg (410 lb) for 51.40 metres (168 ft 8 in) (around 1.5 revolutions) (1993 World Viking Challenge)
- Latra stones loading onto barrels – 4 stones weighing 96–177 kg (212–390 lb) in 16.58 seconds (1994 Iceland's Strongest Viking) (World Record)
- Keg toss – 20 kg (44 lb) over 5.10 metres (16 ft 9 in) (2004 Westfjords Viking)
- Keg toss – 25 kg (55 lb) over 4.00 metres (13 ft 1 in) (1995 Manfred Hoeberl Classic)
- Weight over bar – 25.5 kg (56 lb) over 5.18 metres (17 ft 0 in) (1993 World Viking Challenge)
- Scottish hammer throw – 15 kg (33 lb) super-heavy hammer for 28.54 metres (93 ft 8 in) (1991 World Viking Challenge)
- Arm over arm vertical lift (chest hoist) – 120 kg (265 lb) 4m height in 3.30 seconds (1998 Europe's Strongest Man) (World Record)
- Arm over arm plane pull – 13,500 kg (29,762 lb) 20m course in 34.34 seconds (1992 World's Strongest Man) (World Record)

Powerlifting

- Squat (Equipped/ single-ply) – 400 kg (882 lb) (1991 Íslandsmeistaramót í kraftlyftingum)
- Bench press (Equipped/ single-ply) – 275 kg (606 lb) (2004 Íslandsmeistaramót í kraftlyftingum)
- Bench press (Raw) – 225 kg (496 lb) (2010 Úrslit Íslandsmót)
- Deadlift (Equipped/ single-ply) – 370.5 kg (817 lb) (1991 Íslandsmeistaramót í kraftlyftingum)
- Deadlift (Raw) – 315 kg (694 lb) (2015 Fógetamótið)
- Total (Equipped/ single-ply) – 1,015.5 kg (2,239 lb) (400 + 245 + 370.5 kg (882 + 540 + 817 lb)) (1991 Íslandsmeistaramót í kraftlyftingum)

== See also ==
- List of strongmen
