= Henrik Ravn =

Danish footballer (born 1965)

Personal information
- Full name: Henrik Ravn Jensen
- Date of birth: 21 September 1965 (age 61)
- Place of birth: Denmark
- Position: Forward

Senior career*
Years	Team	Apps	(Gls)
-1986	Vejle Boldklub		
1986-1988	Fortuna Düsseldorf	25	(8)
1988-1989	Vejle Boldklub		
1989-1991/92	Esbjerg fB		
1991/92-1994	AC Horsens		
- * Club domestic league appearances and goals

Henrik Ravn (born 21 September 1965 in Denmark) is a Danish retired footballer.
