= Colin Cox =

Australian rules footballer

Personal information
- Full name: Colin George Cox
- Born: 11 October 1922; Northcote, Victoria
- Died: 21 November 1989 (aged 67); Queensland
- Original team: Wesley College
- Height: 175 cm (5 ft 9 in)
- Weight: 73 kg (161 lb)

Playing career^{1}
Years	Club	Games (Goals)
1941–46	Fitzroy	5 (0)
1948–49	Melbourne	3 (2)
Total		8 (2)
- ^{1} Playing statistics correct to the end of 1949.

Colin George Cox (11 October 1922 – 21 November 1989) was an Australian rules footballer who played with Fitzroy and Melbourne in the Victorian Football League (VFL).
