= World's Strongest Man =

Strongman competition

Tournament information
- Location: Worldwide
- Established: 1977; 49 years ago
- Number of tournaments: 49
- Format: Multi-event competition
- Website: theworldsstrongestman.com

Current champion
- (Canada) Mitchell Hooper

Most recent tournament
- 2026 World's Strongest Man

The World's Strongest Man is an international strongman competition held every year. Organized by American event management company IMG, a subsidiary of TKO Group Holdings, it is broadcast in the US during summers and in the UK around the end of December each year. Competitors qualify based on placing in the top three at the four to eight Giants Live events each year. The current event sponsor is SBD Apparel.

The competition has been won by 25 men representing 14 nationalities. Three of the past champions Bill Kazmaier, Hafþór Júlíus Björnsson and Brian Shaw have been inducted into the International Sports Hall of Fame.

== History ==
There are now several documentaries available that chart the history of WSM. The first major one is Worlds Strongest Man - Thirty Years Of Pain from 2008, celebrating the 30th anniversary. In 2017, a series of videos were released in recognition of the 40th anniversary of the contest.

=== 1970s–1980s ===
The concept behind "The World's Strongest Men", as it was originally named, was developed in 1977 for CBS by Langstar Inc. David Webster, a Scot who later received an OBE for his services to sport, was the head coordinator of the competition from its inception. Douglas Edmunds, seven-time Scottish shot and discus champion and twice world caber champion, worked with Webster and when Webster retired, Edmunds took over. These two men were responsible for inviting the competitors and choosing the events. In the meantime, in 1982, CBS sold the rights to the BBC, who in turn sold the rights to TWI. In 1987, the WSM was not held for the only time since its inception. In that year, the first and only non-team Pure Strength competition was held, but it was not part of the WSM franchise.

For the first several contests, American color commentators and analysts were used on the network broadcast. These included Brent Musburger, Tom Brookshier, and acknowledged strength authority, journalist and author Terry Todd. Todd was a former powerlifting world record holder himself and went on to establish the H.J. Lutcher Stark Center for Physical Culture and Sports in 1990. He also was asked to establish the Arnold Strongman Classic in 2002 by Arnold Schwarzenegger.

During this early period, the contest ranks consisted mostly of American football players, powerlifters, and bodybuilders and were held in American locations until it was moved to Christchurch, New Zealand, in 1983. Two-time winner Bruce Wilhelm (USA) retired and was succeeded by Don Reinhoudt in 1979, a 162.1 kg (357 lb) heavyweight powerlifter of the US. Reinhoudt still holds several unequipped world records in powerlifting.

In 1979, newcomer and powerlifter Bill Kazmaier (USA) made his appearance, coming in 3rd after leading much of the competition. He dominated the sport to such an extent from 1980 to 1982, winning by a record 28 points in 1980. He reportedly was excluded from the competition for five years, after becoming the first man to win three consecutive WSM titles. He set prodigious marks with a 478.6 kg (1055 lb) silver dollar coin deadlift, 439.6 kg (969 lb) squat (smith machine), and a then-record 165.6 kg (365 lb) log lift with a rough, unbalanced log. This eventually earned him a place in the WSM Hall of Fame.

After Kazmaier left, his nearest rival, former Olympian Geoff Capes from the UK, traded wins with the Icelandic powerlifter Jón Páll Sigmarsson, with Capes winning in 1983 and 1985, and Sigmarsson in 1984 and 1986. Sigmarsson raised the popularity and awareness of the event to new levels. He died three years after winning his 4th and final WSM in 1990. In 1987, Sigmarsson defeated Capes and Kazmaier in Pure Strength. Kazmaier returned to WSM in 1988, but could not dethrone Sigmarsson, who won his 3rd title. The only other man to claim the title in this era was Jamie Reeves, which he did in 1989. Reeves was injured in 1990, as Sigmarsson narrowly claimed his 4th title ahead of O.D. Wilson, who was leading by 5.5 points going into the final event, a controversial 200m race with 100 kg on the back. Sigmarsson won the event, and the much larger Wilson finished way down the field, meaning Jon Pall became the first man to claim four titles.

=== 1990s ===
In 1995, Edmunds and Webster, along with representatives from the competitors including Jamie Reeves, Ilkka Kinnunen and Marcel Mostert formed a governing body called the International Federation of Strength Athletes ("IFSA"). The IFSA began organizing bespoke events, such as the IFSA European Championships and also took the lead in working with the BBC and with TWI to organize the World's Strongest Man competition. For almost a decade, the IFSA and WSM were inextricably mixed, but this changed in 2004. The InvestGroup Ventures' sports rights management arm, InvestGroup Sports Management, invested heavily into IFSA and this led to the creation of IFSA Strongman. The strategy was to acquire most of the international assets and properties relating to the strongman sport. In essence, this was a new organisation with some, such as Magnus Samuelsson, describing it as "a new company ... with the same name as our old federation". The attempt at dominance was not well received by TWI and disagreement ensued leading to a split in the sport. Previously, in 2001, the IFSA in its former guise had entered an agreement with World Class Events (WCE), headed by Ulf Bengtsson, to run the Super Series. This Super Series was designed to award the World Championship title, but also acted as a qualifying vehicle for the WSM. When strongman split in 2004, the Super Series sided with TWI forming a rival federation to the IFSA. With the WSM being a TWI owned event, IFSA Holdings announced its own World Championships for 2005, to be held in Quebec, and thus from that point had no involvement in the WSM contest.

The split with IFSA, which banned its registered athletes from competing at WSM, meant that not all the recognized best strength athletes in the world were eligible to compete. However, the reputation of WSM as the premier event maintained its lure for broadcasting purposes. In recent years, the competition has been broadcast on ESPN, ESPN2, TSN, Televisa Deportes and Five, and currently CBS Sports Network in the US. The longevity of the contest in strength athletics and its high levels of TV exposure over the years has led to it being described as "the granddaddy of all strongman contests".

No other strongman contest commands close to the WSM's levels of TV exposure. The World's Strongest Man claims a viewership of 220 million.

In the early 1990s, Magnús Ver Magnússon (Iceland) won the title four times (1991, 1994–1996) and became the second and only man along with Kazmaier to win three consecutive titles. He came into the 1991 contest as the reserve and ended up winning the show, and is the only man to do so.

Magnús also finished second in both 1992 and 1993. The 1992 contest was won by Dutchman Ted van der Parre, who at 7 feet tall, is the tallest man ever to win or compete at the World's Strongest Man. In one of the closest contests in the competition's history, just one point separated van der Parre in first from Magnús and Jamie Reeves, who tied for second. In 1993, Welshman Gary Taylor became the shortest man to ever win the contest at just 6 feet tall, defeating Magnús and Riku Kiri of Finland.

Magnús eventually won his second title in 1994, defeating Austrian Manfred Hoeberl in a closely-fought contest, with Kiri finishing third for the second year running. He retained his title the following year, with South African Gerrit Badenhorst and Finland's Marko Varalahti completing the podium. In 1996, Magnús made it to three titles in a row, with his closest competitor Kiri pulling out of the final event due to injury, but still finishing in second. Badenhorst made the podium for the second year in a row. None of these three men reached the final the following year.

The relatively light 125 kg (275 lb) but dynamic Jouko Ahola from Finland won two titles in three years, 1997 and 1999. He later became a referee in WSM/strongman events and an actor. Sweden's Magnus Samuelsson would claim the 1998 title, becoming the only man to defeat Ahola in a WSM contest.

=== 2000s ===
Following Ahola's retirement, fellow Finn Janne Virtanen improved on his 1999-runner up finish and take the title for himself in 2000. The final Nordic athlete to take the title among the group dominant from the mid 1980s was Norwegian Svend Karlsen, who did so in 2001.

The early to late 2000s were dominated by five-time Polish winner Mariusz Pudzianowski, earning him the nickname "The Dominator". Looking muscular and defined, he temporarily redefined what a strongman was in the world's eyes. At about 142 kg (313 lb) at max weight, he routinely beat men much bigger than he was. He combined speed and substantial strength in one package. Indeed, he was so dominant that three of his five championships (2003, 2005 and 2007) were won with an event to spare. His final win was in 2008 as bigger and taller men came into the sport.

Pudzianowski's first title was in 2002, as the era of Scandinavian dominance came to an end, with Lithuanian Žydrūnas Savickas and Latvian Raimonds Bergmanis completing the podium. He defended his title in 2003 in spectacular fashion. He won four of the seven events, and claiming two second places and a third place in the remaining events to finish with 66 out of a possible 70 points, and 20 ahead of runner up Savickas. 2003 was also the first appearance of Ukrainian Vasyl Virastyuk, who finished 3rd.

In 2004, Savickas and Virastyuk were tied for the lead heading into the final event, the Atlas Stones. Virastyuk defeated Savickas to claim the title, with the Lithuanian finishing as runner-up for the 3rd year in a row. Originally, Mariusz Pudzianowski finished in 3rd but was later disqualified after failing a drugs test, meaning Magnus Samuelsson once again finished on the podium.

Following the split of IFSA and WSM, most of the athletes stayed with IFSA. Pudzianowski was the only athlete from the 2004 contest to compete at WSM in 2005. He won the contest with an event to spare ahead of runner up Jesse Marunde, who with third place Dominic Filiou became the first non-Europeans to reach the podium of WSM since O.D. Wilson in 1990.

The 2006 competition ended in dramatic fashion: in the final, Mariusz Pudzianowski started well by coming tied-1st in the Deadlift and winning the Power Stairs easily; but by then winning the last 5 events in a row, Phil Pfister edged out the Pole in the final event, the Atlas stones. Pfister became the first American to win the competition since 1982, and the first American ever to win the competition outside the United States.

Pudzianowski regained his crown in 2007, winning the contest with an event to spare. Fellow Pole Sebastian Wenta claimed 2nd place, with Britain's Terry Hollands rounding out the podium.

In 2008, Derek Poundstone had a large lead over Mariusz Pudzianowski after three events but Pudzianowski tied the Deadlift event for first place and then won the crucial Plane Pull to narrow the gap. Pudzianowski and Poundstone then battled for the title of World's Strongest Man in the last event, the Atlas Stones. Pudzianowski blistered through the event and was able to keep pace with the heavier Poundstone. On the final stone, Pudzianowski was able to capitalize on Poundstone's drop and clinched his fifth title.

In 2009, the long-running IFSA/WSM split had ended, resulting in finally having all of the top strongmen from around the world compete in the same contest. Two-time IFSA World Champion Žydrūnas Savickas returned to the contest after 5 years and claimed his first WSM title, with defending champion Mariusz Pudzianowski coming in second in his final ever WSM contest. Another up and comer Brian Shaw placed third.

=== 2010s ===
Žydrūnas Savickas repeated his victory in 2010, winning by countback against Brian Shaw in the closest finish in WSM history. Top IFSA competitor and fan favorite Mikhail Koklyaev finished third in his WSM debut. Savickas set a new world record in the Giant Wooden Log Lift with a lift of 210 kg (460 lb).

In 2011, Brian Shaw and two-time defending champion Žydrūnas Savickas were tied on points going into the final event. Shaw defeated Savickas in the Atlas Stones, winning his first title. Over the next four years, the pair traded the title back and forth. Going into the 2012 contest, Shaw suffered from nerve damage in his hands and slipped down to fourth place. This opened the door for Savickas to capture his third WSM title, with fellow Lithuanian Vytautas Lalas coming in second and the Icelandic giant Hafþór Júlíus Björnsson finishing third. Savickas set a new world record in the Log Lift with a lift of 220 kg (490 lb). Shaw regained his title in 2013, ahead of Savickas (2nd) and Björnsson (3rd). The 2014 contest was one of the closest battles in WSM history, with these three men separated by just two points going into the Atlas Stones. Savickas clinched the title by just half a point ahead of Björnsson, and just 3 ahead of Shaw, becoming the fourth man to win four titles. This victory made Savickas the oldest athlete to ever win the title at the age of 38 years and 8 months.

Shaw defeated Savickas once again in 2015, with the title coming down to the two of them in the final event for the 4th time. Björnsson finished on the podium yet again, with Britain's Eddie Hall coming in 4th. Savickas didn't compete in 2016, as Shaw successfully defended his title and joined Savickas on four titles. Björnsson made a fifth podium finish as the runner up, as Hall continued his steady rise to finish 3rd, despite placing last in the first event.

In the 2017 contest, two four-time winners Brian Shaw and Žydrūnas Savickas competed head-to-head for the first time since the 2015 contest, but Eddie Hall won his first title over runner-up Hafþór Júlíus Björnsson by 1 point and was the first person to win for the UK since Welshman Gary Taylor in 1993.

Hafþór Júlíus Björnsson won the 2018 after three 2nd place and three 3rd-place finishes and became the first Icelander since Magnús Ver Magnússon in 1996 to win the title. Mateusz Kieliszkowski of Poland finished second and four-time winner Brian Shaw of the United States third. Žydrūnas Savickas, also a four-time winner, finished tenth after withdrawing in event four due to an injury.

The 2019 contest was held in Bradenton, Florida. The contest was won by Martins Licis of the United States who defeated defending champion Hafþór Júlíus Björnsson of Iceland. Björnsson suffered an injury, plantar fasciitis, in the qualifying heats but was able to complete the competition and finish 3rd on the podium, with Mateusz Kieliszkowski finishing as the runner up for the second consecutive year. This year also saw brothers Tom and Luke Stoltman both qualify for the final, becoming the first brothers to both reach the final in history. A new format which included only 25 instead of 30 competitors was used and the entire competition only ran for 4 days instead of the usual 5+. The final was reduced to 5 events and took only one day. The new format was designed to streamline the editing for a quicker television turnaround.

=== 2020s ===
Due to the COVID-19 pandemic, the 2020 contest, initially planned to be held in May at Bradenton, was postponed to November instead. In place from May through July was a special series called "World's Strongest Man: Home Edition" on Snapchat Discover, where participating strongman athletes filmed themselves at home recreating strongman events in creative ways, and fans could vote for their favourites. The series was hosted by Eddie Hall. Rongo Keene was declared the winner, earning him a $10,000 prize.

The 2020 contest was to be held on Anna Maria Island from 11 to 15 November, with no physical spectators allowed due to the ongoing COVID-19 pandemic. The competition also went back to the previous rules of 30 competitors in the groups and a six event final. Because of bad weather conditions brought about by Hurricane Eta, the first two days were instead pushed back a day, removing the rest day planned on 13 November. For the first time in WSM history, none of the podium finishers from the previous year (Mariusz Pudzianowski was originally a podium finisher in 2004 before failing a drugs test) competed in the contest. (Both Licis and Kieliszkowski were injured, whereas Björnsson had retired to focus on his boxing match with Eddie Hall). The contest was won by Oleksii Novikov, who set a new partial deadlift record of 537.5 kg (1,185 lbs) during the finals. Tom Stoltman came in 2nd place winning three of six events, while Jean-François Caron came in 3rd.

The 2021 edition of the contest took place in Sacramento, California from 15 to 20 June. Defending champion Novikov failed to advance from his qualifying heat, after finishing 4th in a tightly fought group which saw just one point separating 1st and 4th position. Tom Stoltman improved on his second-place finish the year before to claim his first title after defeating four-time champion Brian Shaw head-to-head in the Atlas Stones, and became the first Scotsman to win the title. Shaw finished second, his best placing since his 4th title in 2016, and his first podium finish since 2018, while Canada's Maxime Boudreault placed third in his first WSM final.

The 2022 contest held in Sacramento again was shaping up to be one of the best contests yet, with 2019 champion Martins Licis returning, and four former champions in the competition. Mateusz Kieliszkowski was once again forced to withdraw due to injury. Tom Stoltman successfully defended his title, winning by 10.5 points over Licis (in 2nd) and Oleksii Novikov, who placed 3rd despite winning three of the six events in the final.

The 2023 edition of the contest was held at Myrtle Beach, South Carolina for the first time. Mitchell Hooper continued his rapid rise after his debut the previous year and secured 1st Place with four events wins out of six in the final. 2 time Champion Tom Stoltman finished 2nd and 2020 Champion Oleksii Novikov came 3rd.

Tom Stoltman reclaimed the title of World's Strongest Man with three event wins in the final at the 2024 contest, which was held once again at Myrtle Beach, South Carolina. He also became one of 7 men to hold the title at least 3 times. Previous champion Mitchell Hooper finished 2nd and Evan Singleton came 3rd.

Rayno Nel won the 2025 contest on debut in Sacramento by half a point. 3-time champion Tom Stoltman placed second and 2023 champion Mitchell Hooper third.

Mitchell Hooper won his second World's Strongest Man title at the 2026 contest in Myrtle Beach, South Carolina. Reigning champion Rayno Nel placed second and American Trey Mitchell finished third.

== Competition format and commonly contested events ==
Initially, eight men representing various sports and strength disciplines were invited to compete against each other in unique events designed to test each individual to the fullest extent. The earliest events were relatively crude, but new ideas were introduced over the years. Some events had a basis in both powerlifting and Highland Games heavy events, and others were created based on mythological feats of strength. There are a number of events that make up each competition.

- Loading Medley – Several heavy objects, each weighing 220–330 pounds (100–150 kg), are carried/ dragged and loaded onto a truck bed or a similar platform over a course of about 10–30 metres (33–98 ft).
- Atlas Stones – Five heavy round stones increasing in weight in the range of 220–350 pounds (100–159 kg) are lifted and set on platforms. When the stones were first introduced to the competition, it was an individual event and the platforms were all of equal height. The modern Atlas Stones event takes place on a 16–33-foot (5–10 m) long course and the competitors participate two at a time. There are three current variations to the Atlas Stones event. In one, the stones are placed directly in front of the platforms and the competitors must simply lift and place them, generally the lightest stone being placed on the highest platform. In another, the stones are placed in a diagonal line, with the first stone being in front of the first platform, and each subsequent stone is set farther back from the course, with the heaviest stone being farthest away (or vice versa). The third variation sees the five platforms in a straight vertical line with the stones in front of each, and the competitors must place the stones and then move a short distance to the next one. In recent competitions, this is typically the final event. In the 2015 competition, the heaviest stone was 209 kilos (461 lbs).
- Vehicle pull – Vehicles such as transport trucks, trams, boxcars, buses, or planes are pulled across a 100-foot (30 m) course as fast as possible. One variation sees the competitors pull the object with a rope toward them. Another has them attached to a rope which is attached to a vehicle, while they use another rope to pull themselves down the course. A third involves no ropes, with the competitors pulling the vehicle while connected to a harness. The 2007 competition featured pulling a fire truck (possibly a nod to 2006 champion Phil Pfister, a professional firefighter) and the 2008 qualifying rounds featured a coal truck (a reference to the coal mining industry in West Virginia, where the competition was held).
- Overhead Press – The heaviest possible load is pressed overhead, or a lighter weight is used for repetitions.
- Fingal's Fingers – A series of hinged poles ("fingers") are lifted starting from a horizontal resting position and flipped over to the other side. The poles get progressively heavier and longer. The event is scored by time and by how many of the poles a competitor was able to flip over. The event takes its name from Fingal, a mythological Gaelic hunter-warrior.
- Power Stairs – A series of three Duck Walk implements ranging from 400–600 pounds (181–272 kg) are lifted, step by step, to the top of a flight of stairs.
- Squat – Squatting large weights, such as 900 pounds (410 kg) of bricks, a car, or people on a platform. Recently, an apparatus has been used that drops weighted kegs into a cage, one at a time after each successful lift (the event, in this case, is scored by weight instead of repetitions). The athlete will continue until completion, failure or time expires.
- Dead Lift – Lifting weights or vehicles up to about 1,100 pounds (500 kg) straight off the ground until knees lock in a standing position. Lift is for either maximum weight, maximum repetitions with a fixed weight, or for time whilst holding a single repetition. In recent years, a similar keg-loaded apparatus to that described above for the squat has been used.
- Keg Toss – Competitors must throw kegs, of increasing weight, over a 14 ft 6 in (4.42 m) high bar. A variation using kettlebells was added to the 2015 competition, while in 2017, gold bricks were used.
- Weight over bar – A 56-pound (25 kg) weight is thrown overhead with the goal being to clear a barrier above the competitor. The goal is to throw the weight the highest.
- Bar bending – Competitors have to grip long iron rods from their edges, use their arm and grip strength, and bend until the two ends come closer to each other.
- Car Carry – Competitors stand inside a stripped-down automobile, which is missing some of its roof and all of its bottom and interior, and carry it across a 25-meter (82 ft) course. Competitors are scored by time, then distance once the time-limit expires.
- Hercules Hold – The athlete stands between two hinged pillars, gripping handles that prevent the pillars from falling to the side. The pillars are held for the longest possible time.
- Carry and Drag – An anchor and a chain are carried to the end of a set distance, where they must be attached to each other and then dragged back the same distance.
- Farmer's Walk – Competitors carry heavy objects (usually anvils) weighing from 275 to 375 lbs (125 to 170 kg) in each hand for a set distance, and compete for the fastest time. A variation involves the use of a heavy frame with parallel handles or heavy objects attached to handles, and another involves much heavier weights (referred to as the Giant Farmer's Walk). This event is usually done on the same course as the Carry and Drag and is conducted as a race, but one competition in Sanya, China saw the competitors compete individually carrying the weights up a small set of stairs. The 2001 competition saw the competitors race two at a time along a course requiring several turns.
- Super Yoke – Apparatus composed of a crossbar and two uprights. The uprights each have a heavy weight attached to them, such as a refrigerator or diesel engine, and the competitors must carry the yoke on their shoulders for a short distance.
- Husafell Stone – A flat, somewhat triangular lifting stone weighing around 410 lb (186 kg) is carried high on the chest for a set distance or for overall distance within a time limit. The stone is named for a famous one in Iceland, which actually was brought out for use when the competition was held in Iceland. During some years which the competition took place in Africa, this event was known as the Africa Stone and the stone was in the shape of the continent as it appears on a map. The 2017 competition called this event the Elephant Carry, and the stone was shaped like the head and face of an African elephant.
- Duck Walk – An object with a handle is carried, suspended between the legs, over a set course.
- Log Throw / Caber toss – A five-meter-long (16 1/2 foot) log is thrown for distance or for height over a bar. When thrown for distance, the event is conducted similarly to the normal caber toss but with distance replacing technique. The length of the throw is determined by measuring the distance between where the competitor's toes were when he tossed and the tip of the log, based on where it first landed.
- Tug of War – One on one tug of war in a single-elimination tournament. In the first few competitions, this determined the champion and served as the final event.
- Pole Pushing – One on one pole pushing in a Sumo-style ring in a single-elimination tournament. The pole has handles at either end.
- Crucifix – Weights are held straight out at each side for as long a time as possible. A common variation entails weights being held out in front, using either one or both hands.
- Giant Dumbbell Press – Single-handed dumbbells are hoisted from the ground onto the competitor's shoulder, from where, with one hand, he must raise it vertically over his head and lockout his arm. With four weights between 100 and 115 kilograms (220 and 254 lb), scoring is based on time and number of successful lifts.
- Basque Circle/Stone Circle/Conan's Wheel – A competitor takes hold of the handle of a metal basket by placing the handle on his forearms. Inside the basket, usually, is at least 600 pounds (270 kg) of heavy stones (the 2015 WSM replaced the stones with pineapples and at least one earlier competition used a car). Holding the basket in the crook of his elbow, the competitor carries the basket in a clockwise manner over a platform with a 25-meter (82 ft) circumference. The event is contested for distance.
- Norse Hammers – Added to the competition for the first time in 2015, the Norse Hammers is similar to the Fingal's Fingers event. Three hammers, shaped like those of Norse god Thor, must be flipped over. Unlike the Fingal Fingers, the competitors must lift the hammer from the side before pushing it up. There are three hammers, weighing 350, 365, and 380 pounds, respectively. In order to complete the event, all three hammers must be flipped within the time limit.
- Circus Barbell – Similar to the Overhead Press, this event gets its name from the apparatus used which resembles the classically shaped barbell used by circus strongmen. The barbell, which weighs 150 kilograms (330 lb), consists of two heavy spheres with a thick, flexible bar that makes it difficult for the competitors to lift. The event is conducted for reps within a time limit and the movement to complete the lift resembles a clean and press lift.

Beginning in 2017, the qualifying format was changed. After five events, the leader clinches a spot in the final while the last place competitor is eliminated from the competition. To determine the second finalist of the group, a new event called Last Man Standing was added. An Atlas Stone is placed at the center of an octagon and, one at a time, the competitors must lift the stone and drop it over a 55-inch metal bar. They each have twenty seconds to do this, and once one cannot complete the drop, he is eliminated and the next highest scoring competitor entering the event takes his turn. The competition continues in stepladder fashion, beginning with the fourth and fifth place competitors, until only one remains; that competitor is declared the winner of the event and secures the second place in the final for the qualifying group.

The 2018 competition used the Atlas Stones event to determine the second finalist. The three lowest scorers were eliminated from the competition, and the second and third-place finishers squared off with the winner advancing to the final.

The 2019 competition saw the return of Last Man Standing, but instead of featuring the remaining four competitors, only the second and third place competitors square off to determine the second finalist.

The 2025 competition will see a format change with the finalists performance in the group stage counting towards the final. Each finalist can start between 1-10 points. The last man standing event has also been abandoned.

== Championship breakdown ==
=== Podiums ===
Year	Winner	Runner-up	Third place	Host city
1977	(United States) Bruce Wilhelm	(United States) Bob Young	(United States) Ken Patera	(United States) Universal Studios, California
1978	(United States) Bruce Wilhelm (2)	(United States) Don Reinhoudt	(Sweden) Lars Hedlund	(United States) Universal Studios, California
1979	(United States) Don Reinhoudt	(Sweden) Lars Hedlund	(United States) Bill Kazmaier	(United States) Universal Studios, California
1980	(United States) Bill Kazmaier	(Sweden) Lars Hedlund	(United Kingdom) Geoff Capes	(United States) Playboy Club, New Jersey
1981	(United States) Bill Kazmaier (2)	(United Kingdom) Geoff Capes	(United States) Dave Waddington	(United States) Magic Mountain, California
1982	(United States) Bill Kazmaier (3)	(Canada) Tom Magee	(United States) John Gamble	(United States) Magic Mountain, California
1983	(United Kingdom) Geoff Capes	(Iceland) Jón Páll Sigmarsson	(Netherlands) Simon Wulfse	Christchurch, New Zealand
1984	(Iceland) Jón Páll Sigmarsson	(Netherlands) Ab Wolders	(United Kingdom) Geoff Capes	Mora, Sweden
1985	(United Kingdom) Geoff Capes (2)	(Iceland) Jón Páll Sigmarsson	(Netherlands) Cees de Vreugd	Cascais, Portugal
1986	(Iceland) Jón Páll Sigmarsson (2)	(United Kingdom) Geoff Capes	(Netherlands) Ab Wolders	Nice, France
1987	Not Held (Note: In 1987 the WSM was not held for the only time since its inception. In that year the first and only non-team Pure Strength competition was held. Although it was not part of the WSM franchise, some commentators regard it as a replacement for WSM in that year.)			
1988	(Iceland) Jón Páll Sigmarsson (3)	(United States) Bill Kazmaier	(United Kingdom) Jamie Reeves	Budapest, Hungary
1989	(United Kingdom) Jamie Reeves	(Netherlands) Ab Wolders	(Iceland) Jón Páll Sigmarsson	San Sebastián, Spain
1990	(Iceland) Jón Páll Sigmarsson (4)	(United States) O.D. Wilson	(Finland) Ilkka Nummisto	Joensuu, Finland
1991	(Iceland) Magnús Ver Magnússon	(Denmark) Henning Thorsen	(United Kingdom) Gary Taylor	(Spain) Tenerife, Canary Islands
1992	(Netherlands) Ted van der Parre	(Iceland) Magnús Ver Magnússon	(United Kingdom) Jamie Reeves	Reykjavík, Iceland
1993	(United Kingdom) Gary Taylor	(Iceland) Magnús Ver Magnússon	(Finland) Riku Kiri	Orange, France
1994	(Iceland) Magnús Ver Magnússon (2)	(Austria) Manfred Hoeberl	(Finland) Riku Kiri	Sun City, South Africa
1995	(Iceland) Magnús Ver Magnússon (3)	(South Africa) Gerrit Badenhorst	(Finland) Marko Varalahti	(The Bahamas) Nassau, Bahamas
1996	(Iceland) Magnús Ver Magnússon (4)	(Finland) Riku Kiri	(South Africa) Gerrit Badenhorst	Port Louis, Mauritius
1997	(Finland) Jouko Ahola	(Denmark) Flemming Rasmussen	(Sweden) Magnus Samuelsson	(United States) Primm Valley Resort, Nevada
1998	(Sweden) Magnus Samuelsson	(Finland) Jouko Ahola	(Netherlands) Wout Zijlstra	Tangier, Morocco
1999	(Finland) Jouko Ahola (2)	(Finland) Janne Virtanen	(Norway) Svend Karlsen	Valletta, Malta
2000	(Finland) Janne Virtanen	(Norway) Svend Karlsen	(Sweden) Magnus Samuelsson	Sun City, South Africa
2001	(Norway) Svend Karlsen	(Sweden) Magnus Samuelsson	(Finland) Janne Virtanen	Victoria Falls, Zambia
2002	(Poland) Mariusz Pudzianowski	(Lithuania) Žydrūnas Savickas	(Latvia) Raimonds Bergmanis	Kuala Lumpur, Malaysia
2003	(Poland) Mariusz Pudzianowski (2)	(Lithuania) Žydrūnas Savickas	(Ukraine) Vasyl Virastyuk	Victoria Falls, Zambia
2004	(Ukraine) Vasyl Virastyuk	(Lithuania) Žydrūnas Savickas	(Sweden) Magnus Samuelsson	(The Bahamas) Nassau, Bahamas
2005	(Poland) Mariusz Pudzianowski (3)	(United States) Jesse Marunde	(Canada) Dominic Filiou	Chengdu, China
2006	(United States) Phil Pfister	(Poland) Mariusz Pudzianowski	(United States) Don Pope	Sanya, China
2007	(Poland) Mariusz Pudzianowski (4)	(Poland) Sebastian Wenta	(United Kingdom) Terry Hollands	(United States) Anaheim, California
2008	(Poland) Mariusz Pudzianowski (5)	(United States) Derek Poundstone	(United States) Dave Ostlund	(United States) Charleston, West Virginia
2009	(Lithuania) Žydrūnas Savickas	(Poland) Mariusz Pudzianowski	(United States) Brian Shaw	Valletta, Malta
2010	(Lithuania) Žydrūnas Savickas (2)	(United States) Brian Shaw	(Russia) Mikhail Koklyaev	Sun City, South Africa
2011	(United States) Brian Shaw	(Lithuania) Žydrūnas Savickas	(United Kingdom) Terry Hollands	(United States) Wingate, North Carolina
2012	(Lithuania) Žydrūnas Savickas (3)	(Lithuania) Vytautas Lalas	(Iceland) Hafþór Júlíus Björnsson	(United States) Los Angeles, California
2013	(United States) Brian Shaw (2)	(Lithuania) Žydrūnas Savickas	(Iceland) Hafþór Júlíus Björnsson	Sanya, China
2014	(Lithuania) Žydrūnas Savickas (4)	(Iceland) Hafþór Júlíus Björnsson	(United States) Brian Shaw	(United States) Los Angeles, California
2015	(United States) Brian Shaw (3)	(Lithuania) Žydrūnas Savickas	(Iceland) Hafþór Júlíus Björnsson	Putrajaya, Malaysia
2016	(United States) Brian Shaw (4)	(Iceland) Hafþór Júlíus Björnsson	(United Kingdom) Eddie Hall	Kasane, Botswana
2017	(United Kingdom) Eddie Hall	(Iceland) Hafþór Júlíus Björnsson	(United States) Brian Shaw	Gaborone, Botswana
2018	(Iceland) Hafþór Júlíus Björnsson	(Poland) Mateusz Kieliszkowski	(United States) Brian Shaw	Manila, Philippines
2019	(United States) Martins Licis (Note: Licis was born in Latvia and is a dual citizen, but represented the United States in 2019.)	(Poland) Mateusz Kieliszkowski	(Iceland) Hafþór Júlíus Björnsson	(United States) Bradenton, Florida
2020	(Ukraine) Oleksii Novikov	(United Kingdom) Tom Stoltman	(Canada) Jean-François Caron	(United States) Bradenton, Florida
2021	(United Kingdom) Tom Stoltman	(United States) Brian Shaw	(Canada) Maxime Boudreault	(United States) Sacramento, California
2022	(United Kingdom) Tom Stoltman (2)	(United States) Martins Licis	(Ukraine) Oleksii Novikov	(United States) Sacramento, California
2023	(Canada) Mitchell Hooper	(United Kingdom) Tom Stoltman	(Ukraine) Oleksii Novikov	(United States) Myrtle Beach, South Carolina
2024	(United Kingdom) Tom Stoltman (3)	(Canada) Mitchell Hooper	(United States) Evan Singleton	(United States) Myrtle Beach, South Carolina
2025	(South Africa) Rayno Nel	(United Kingdom) Tom Stoltman	(Canada) Mitchell Hooper	(United States) Sacramento, California
2026	(Canada) Mitchell Hooper (2)	(South Africa) Rayno Nel	(United States) Trey Mitchell	(United States) Myrtle Beach, South Carolina

=== Most championships ===
No.	Champion	Times	Years
1	(Poland) Mariusz Pudzianowski	5	2002, 2003, 2005, 2007, 2008
2	(Iceland) Jón Páll Sigmarsson	4	1984, 1986, 1988, 1990
2	(Iceland) Magnús Ver Magnússon	4	1991, 1994, 1995, 1996
2	(Lithuania) Žydrūnas Savickas	4	2009, 2010, 2012, 2014
2	(United States) Brian Shaw	4	2011, 2013, 2015, 2016
6	(United States) Bill Kazmaier	3	1980, 1981, 1982
6	(United Kingdom) Tom Stoltman	3	2021, 2022, 2024
8	(United States) Bruce Wilhelm	2	1977, 1978
8	(United Kingdom) Geoff Capes	2	1983, 1985
8	(Finland) Jouko Ahola	2	1997, 1999
8	(Canada) Mitchell Hooper	2	2023, 2026

=== Most podium finishes ===
No.	Name	Times
1	(Lithuania) Žydrūnas Savickas	10
1	(United States) Brian Shaw	10
3	(Iceland) Hafþór Júlíus Björnsson	8
4	(Poland) Mariusz Pudzianowski	7
4	(Iceland) Jón Páll Sigmarsson	7
6	(Iceland) Magnús Ver Magnússon	6
6	(United Kingdom) Tom Stoltman	6
6	(United Kingdom) Geoff Capes	6
9	(United States) Bill Kazmaier	5
9	(Sweden) Magnus Samuelsson	5
11	(Canada) Mitchell Hooper	4

=== Championships by country ===
Country	Gold	Silver	Bronze	Total
United States	12	9	12	33
Iceland	9	7	5	21
United Kingdom	8	5	8	21
Poland	5	5	0	10
Lithuania	4	7	0	11
Finland	3	3	5	11
Canada	2	2	4	8
Ukraine	2	0	3	5
Sweden	1	3	4	8
Netherlands	1	2	4	7
South Africa	1	2	1	4
Norway	1	1	1	3
Denmark	0	2	0	2
Austria	0	1	0	1
Latvia	0	0	1	1
Russia	0	0	1	1

=== Other ===
Statistics are correct up to and including the end of the 2026 WSM competition.

- Most WSM Titles: 5 – (Poland) Mariusz Pudzianowski (2002–2003, 2005, 2007–2008)
- Most WSM runner-up finishes: 6 – (Lithuania) Žydrūnas Savickas (2002–2004, 2011, 2013, 2015)
- Most WSM 3rd-place finishes: 4 – (United States) Brian Shaw (2009, 2014, 2017, 2018) and (Iceland) Hafþór Júlíus Björnsson (2012, 2013, 2015, 2019)
- Most WSM podium finishes: 10 – (Lithuania) Žydrūnas Savickas (2002–2004, 2009–2015) and (United States) Brian Shaw (2009–2011, 2013–2018, 2021)
- Most WSM top 5 placings: 13 – (United States) Brian Shaw (2009–2018, 2020–2022)
- Most WSM finals: 15 – (United States) Brian Shaw (2009–2023)
- Most times qualified for WSM: 18 – (United Kingdom) Mark Felix (2004, 2006–2011, 2013–2023)
- Most consecutive WSM Titles: 3 – (United States) Bill Kazmaier (1980–1982) and (Iceland) Magnús Ver Magnússon (1994–1996)
- Most consecutive WSM podium finishes: 8 – (Iceland) Hafþór Júlíus Björnsson (2012–2019)
- Most consecutive WSM finals: 15 – (United States) Brian Shaw (2009–2023)
- Most consecutive WSM appearances: 16 – (United States) Brian Shaw (2008–2023)
- Longest Time Between First and Last Championships: 6 years – (Iceland) Jón Páll Sigmarsson (1984–1990) and (Poland) Mariusz Pudzianowski (2002–2008)
- Longest Time Between First and Last Top 3 Finishes: 13 years – (Lithuania) Žydrūnas Savickas (2002–2015)
- Longest Time Between First and Last Qualifications For Final: 16 years – (Lithuania) Žydrūnas Savickas (2002–2018)
- Longest Time Between First and Last Qualifications: 20 years – (Lithuania) Žydrūnas Savickas (1998–2018)
- Longest Gap Between Championships: 3 years – (Iceland) Magnús Ver Magnússon (1991–1994) and (Canada) Mitchell Hooper (2023-2026)
- Longest Gap Between Top 3 Finishes: 6 years – (United States) Bill Kazmaier (1982–1988)
- Longest Gap Between Appearances: 12 years – (Estonia) Rauno Heinla (2011–2023)

== Jimmy Pollock Award ==
Winner	Year
Luke Stoltman	2019
Terry Hollands	2021
Mark Felix	2022
Bertie Smallwood	2023
Barnaby Roberts	2024
Graham Driskel	2025
Pa O'Dwyer	2026

== See also ==
- List of strongman competitions
- List of strongmen
- World's Strongest Woman
