= Keg-tossing =

Sport

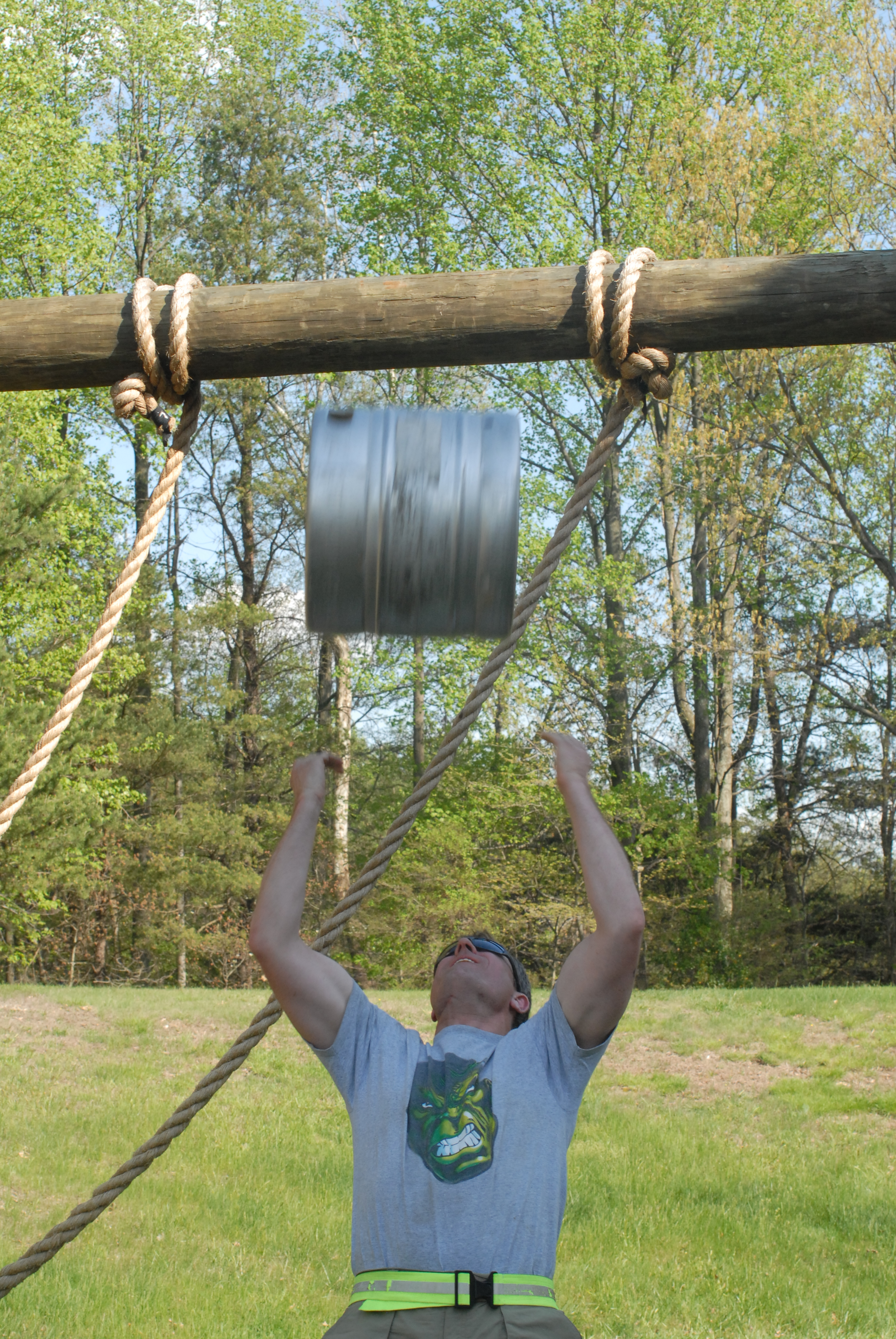
Keg tossing at a strongman event

Keg-tossing (or keg toss) is a traditional strength sport that involves the heaving of a standard half-barrel beer keg or a similar implement. The basic technique involves swinging the keg in a pendulum like manner and releasing when it is at its apex. The keg must be completely emptied before it should be tossed for better stability and to avoid injuries.

== Highland games and Strongman competitions ==
Throughout centuries, several variations of the traditional movement has been carried out during Highland games. In Ireland, empty beer kegs weighing 12.5 kg (28 lb) or 15 kg (33 lb) have been typically thrown over upwards and the height of the toss determined the winner. Another variation in Scotland combined techniques of both the discus and hammer throw. Rather than height, this form measured the farthest distance. In both variations, athletes were given three attempts to throw the keg and the winner was determined by measuring the height or the distance tossed.

The keg toss was introduced to Strongman in 1986 Le Défi Mark Ten International competition where competitors had to throw a 25 kg (55 lb) beer keg for maximum height over a bar. In 2006 World's Strongest Man group stages, multiple kegs were introduced, to be tossed over a bar in the fastest time. In 2010 World's Strongest Man the 8 keg standardization occurred where the competitors had to throw 8 beer kegs of increasing weights ranging from 17–24 kg (37–53 lb) over a 4-meter bar. The keg toss has been featured over 60 times in Strongman competitions and in all above instances, the kegs were thrown overhead, to the rear of the thrower, and over the top of the bar to prove clearance.

== World Records ==
=== Max height/ Max weight ===
(Includes keg toss, sandbag and weight over bar variations)

- Keg toss – 12.5 kg (28 lb) over 8.54 m (28 ft 0 in) by Hafþór Júlíus Björnsson (Iceland) (2014)
- Keg toss – 15 kg (33 lb) over 7.77 m (25 ft 6 in) by Hafþór Júlíus Björnsson (Iceland) (2024)
- Keg toss – 25 kg (55 lb) over 6.00 m (19 ft 8 in) by Hafþór Júlíus Björnsson (Iceland) (2012)
- Sandbag over bar (Max height) – 25 kg (55 lb) over 5.90 m (19 ft 4 in) by Hafþór Júlíus Björnsson (Iceland) (2024)
- Sandbag over bar (Max weight) – 45.4 kg (100 lb) over 4.57 m (15 ft 0 in) by Hafþór Júlíus Björnsson (Iceland) (2017)
- Highland games one arm weight over bar – 25.5 kg (56 lb) over 6.17 m (20 ft 3 in) by Hafþór Júlíus Björnsson (Iceland) (2022)
- David Webster one arm sandbag over bar – 25.5 kg (56 lb) over 5.79 m (19 ft 0 in) by Hafþór Júlíus Björnsson (Iceland) (2024)

=== Speed ===
- Keg toss – 8 kegs (18–25 kg) over 4.8 m (15 ft 9 in) bar in 15.71 sec by Žydrūnas Savickas (Lithuania) (2013)
- Keg toss – 8 kegs (18–25 kg) over 4.9 m (16 ft 1 in) bar in 16.35 sec by Hafþór Júlíus Björnsson (Iceland) (2014)
- Keg toss – 8 kegs (18–24 kg) over 5.2 m (17 ft 1 in) bar in 21.04 sec by Krzysztof Radzikowski (Poland) (2013)
- Keg toss – 10 kegs (18–25 kg) over 4.6 m (15 ft 1 in) bar in 21.02 sec by Aivars Šmaukstelis (Latvia) (2023)

Note: During Savickas's performance, rule was to start while athletes were already touching the first keg. During Björnsson, Radzikowski and Šmaukstelis's performances the starting signal was given when athletes had to stand back in a line, having had to run forward a few feet in order to grab the first keg.

==== Progression of the 12.5 kg (28 lb) keg toss for height world record ====
Height	Holder	Year and Event	Location
7.10 metres (23 ft 3 1/2 in)	(Netherlands) Berend Veneberg	1999 IFSA Hungary Grand Prix	Keszthely, Hungary
7.40 metres (24 ft 3 1/2 in)	(Germany) (To be confirmed)	(To be confirmed)	(To be confirmed)
7.50 metres (24 ft 7 in)	(Iceland) Hafþór Júlíus Björnsson	2014 Guinness World Records, China	Shanghai, China
7.50 metres (24 ft 7 in)	(United States) Mike Burke	2014 Guinness World Records, China	Shanghai, China
7.70 metres (25 ft 3 in)	(Iceland) Hafþór Júlíus Björnsson	2014 Guinness World Records, China	Shanghai, China
7.70 metres (25 ft 3 in)	(United States) Mike Burke	2014 Guinness World Records, China	Shanghai, China
8.00 metres (26 ft 3 in)	(Iceland) Hafþór Júlíus Björnsson	2014 Guinness World Records, China	Shanghai, China
8.05 metres (26 ft 5 in)	(Iceland) Hafþór Júlíus Björnsson	2014 Guinness World Records, Italy	Milan, Italy
8.54 metres (28 ft 0 in)	(Iceland) Hafþór Júlíus Björnsson	2014 New Hampshire Highland Games	Lincoln, New Hampshire, USA

==== Progression of the 15 kg (33 lb) keg toss for height world record ====
Height	Holder	Year and Event	Location
6.40 metres (21 ft 0 in)	(United States) Harold 'Iron Bear' Collins	2001	(To be confirmed)
6.71 metres (22 ft 0 in)	(United States) Johnny Perry	2002 Viking Challenge	Miami Beach, Florida, USA
7.10 metres (23 ft 3 1/2 in)	(Iceland) Hafþór Júlíus Björnsson	2015 Giants Live Scandinavian Open	Norrköping, Sweden
7.15 metres (23 ft 5 1/2 in)	(Iceland) Hafþór Júlíus Björnsson	2016 World's Strongest Man, group 3	Kasane, Botswana
7.25 metres (23 ft 9 1/2 in)	(United States) Brian Shaw	2016 World's Strongest Man, group 2	Kasane, Botswana
7.26 metres (23 ft 10 in)	(Georgia (country)) Konstantine Janashia	2021 World's Strongest Man	Sacramento, California, USA
7.50 metres (24 ft 7 in)	(Canada) Maxime Boudreault	2021 World's Strongest Man	Sacramento, California, USA
7.50 metres (24 ft 7 in)	(Scotland) Tom Stoltman	2021 World's Strongest Man	Sacramento, California, USA
7.75 metres (25 ft 5 in)	(United States) Brian Shaw	2021 World's Strongest Man	Sacramento, California, USA
7.76 metres (25 ft 5 1/2 in)	(Scotland) Tom Stoltman	2024 World's Strongest Man	Myrtle Beach, South Carolina, USA
7.76 metres (25 ft 5 1/2 in)	(Canada) Mitchell Hooper	2024 World's Strongest Man	Myrtle Beach, South Carolina, USA
7.76 metres (25 ft 5 1/2 in)	(Canada) Wesley Derwinsky	2024 World's Strongest Man	Myrtle Beach, South Carolina, USA
7.77 metres (25 ft 6 in)	(Iceland) Hafþór Júlíus Björnsson	2024 Strongest Man on Earth	Loveland, Colorado, USA

==== Progression of the 25 kg (55 lb) keg toss for height world record ====
Height	Holder	Year and Event	Location
4.88 metres (16 ft 0 in)	(Iceland) Jón Páll Sigmarsson	1986 Le Défi Mark Ten International	Montréal, Canada
4.90 metres (16 ft 1 in)	(Scotland) Forbes Cowan	1995 Manfred Hoeberl Classic	Garmisch-Partenkirchen, Germany
5.00 metres (16 ft 5 in)	(Netherlands) Ted van der Parre	1995 Manfred Hoeberl Classic	Garmisch-Partenkirchen, Germany
5.10 metres (16 ft 9 in)	(Wales) Gary Taylor	1995 Manfred Hoeberl Classic	Garmisch-Partenkirchen, Germany
6.00 metres (19 ft 8 in)	(Iceland) Hafþór Júlíus Björnsson	2012 Icelandic Highland Games	Akranes, Iceland

== See also ==
- Weight over bar
- Highland games
