= Sport in Iceland =

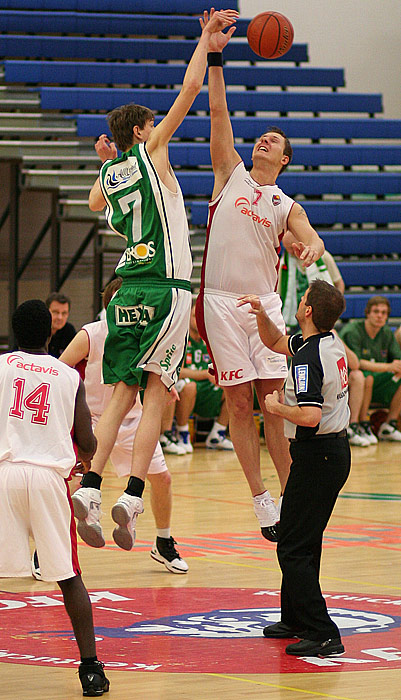
A basketball game in Iceland

Sports in Iceland are very popular. Popular sports include football, handball, athletics, basketball, chess, golf, volleyball, tennis, skiing, snowboarding, ice hockey, swimming, rock climbing, mountain climbing, horseback riding (specially on Icelandic horses), archery, strongman, powerlifting and crossfit. In some of those sports, namely football, handball, basketball and strongman, Iceland is extremely successful, considering its population. It manages to compete at comparable level with countries that have 10-200 times its population.

Iceland's most famous athlete comes from the world of football. Eiður Guðjohnsen has played in England's Premier League for Chelsea F.C. winning the league title and the Community Shield twice, as well as the League Cup once. He also played in La Liga for FC Barcelona, where he was part of the team that won the Treble of the league, Copa del Rey and the UEFA Champions League in the 2008–09 season. Iceland has produced one NBA player who appeared in an NBA regular season game. The player was Peter Gudmundsson, who played parts of 4 sesons in the NBA. Gudmundsson appeared in a total of 150 regular season NBA games. Another Icelandic player, Jon Stefansson, signed a contract with the Dallas Mavericks but due to injury never appeared in a regular season NBA game.

== Athletics ==
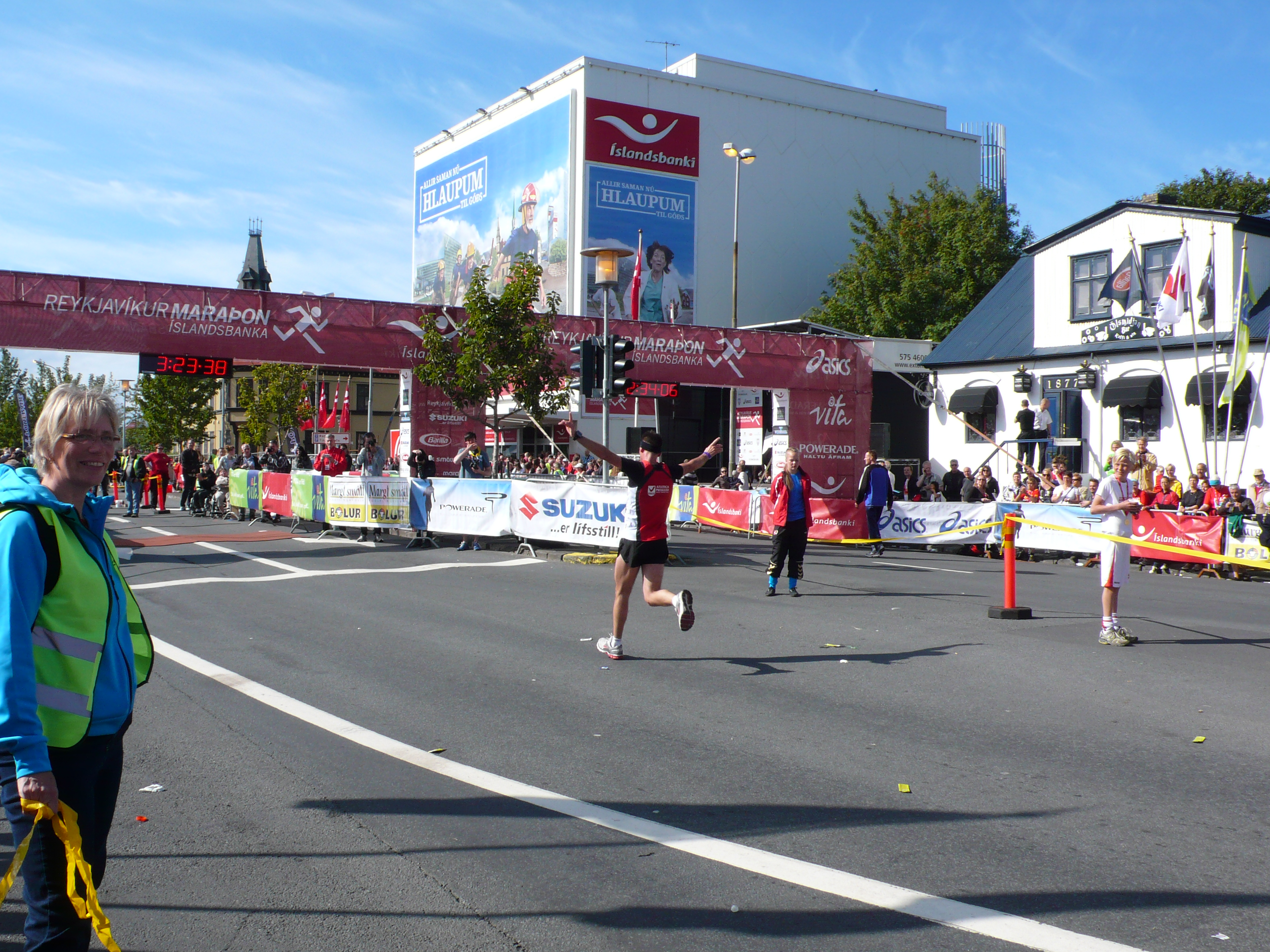
A runner at the 2011 Reykjavík Marathon

In athletics, shot putter Gunnar Huseby became one of the country's first international champions when he won two gold medals at the European Athletics Championships in 1946 and 1950. Iceland's greatest period of success in the sport was in the 1950s, when Torfi Bryngeirsson was European long jump champion, Vilhjálmur Einarsson was an Olympic and European triple jump medallist, and Örn Clausen was European runner-up in the decathlon. Einarsson is the most decorated person of the Icelandic Sportsperson of the Year award, being a five-time winner.

Vala Flosadóttir, pole vault medalist at the 2000 Summer Olympics, is the country's most successful female track athlete, having set world indoor records and won European and World Indoor medals. Decathlete Jón Arnar Magnússon has also won several international indoor medals. Hreinn Halldórsson was the 1977 European Indoor champion in the shot put (Iceland's sole winner at that competition).

The annual Reykjavík Marathon is held in mid-August with around 10,000 people taking part in the various races on offer. The Laugavegur Ultramarathon, a 55 km running competition, has been held each year since 1997.

== Multi-sport events ==
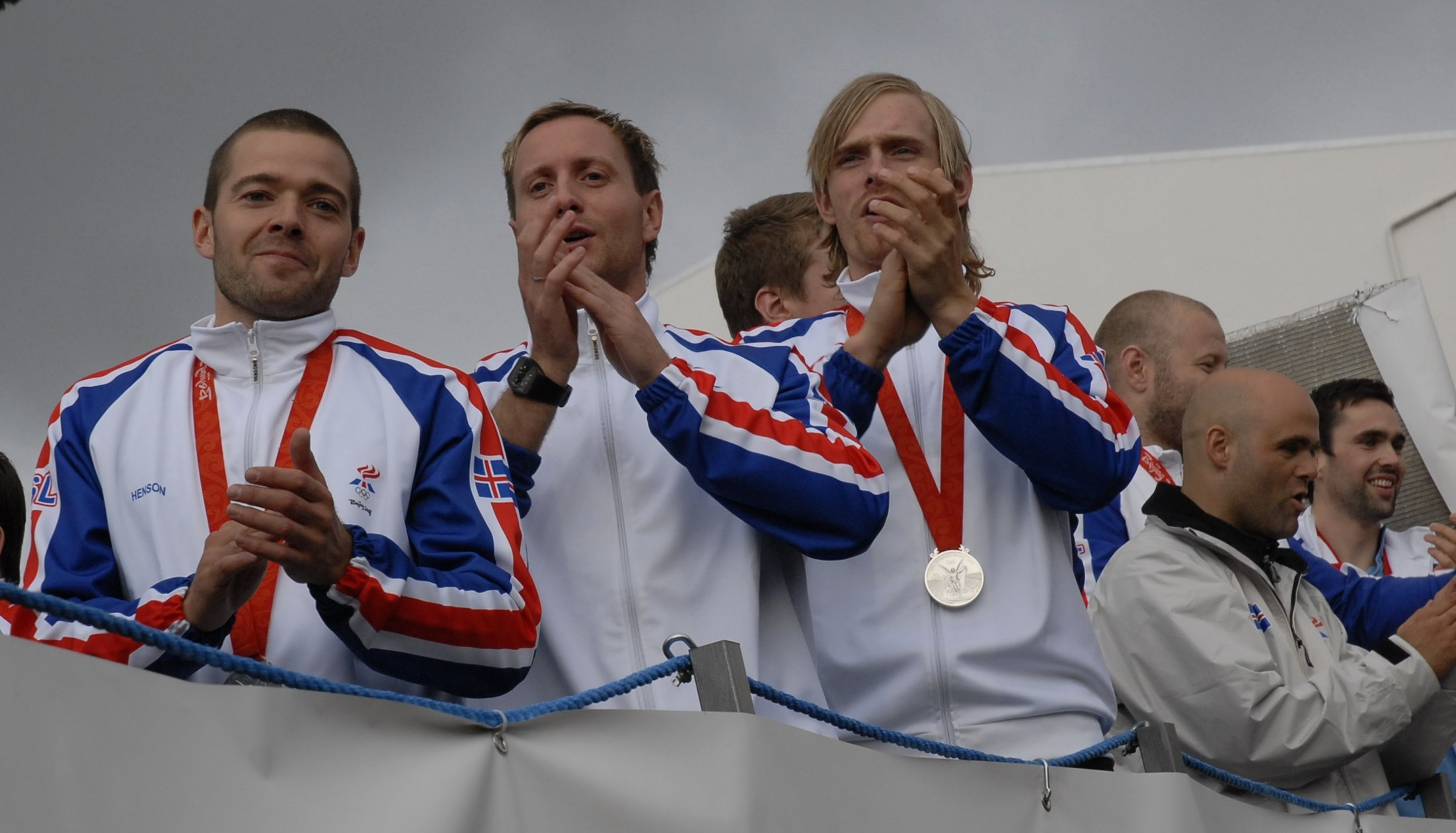
Members of Iceland's 2008 Olympic medal-winning handball team

The Icelandic Olympic team first sent athletes to the Summer Olympics in 1948. Icelandic athletes competed at the 1908 and 1912 Olympics, but these were part of Denmark's delegation (Iceland not being independent at that point). Iceland has been present at the Winter Olympics for all editions since the inaugural 1948 games, bar 1972 when no Iceland athletes were present.

Iceland has won four Olympic medals in its history. The first was Vilhjálmur Einarsson, who won the 1956 men's triple jump silver medal. Bjarni Friðriksson won a bronze medal in 1984 in men's judo and Vala Flosadóttir became the first woman medalist in 2000, taking the pole vault bronze. Iceland's first team Olympic medal was won by the men's handball team at the 2008 Beijing Olympics.

The Icelandic Paralympic team made its debut at the 1980 Summer Paralympics and has sent athletes to the competition for each subsequent edition. It has made only three appearances at the Winter Paralympics. As of 2012, the country has won over sixty Paralympic medals.

Iceland is a regular participant at the Games of the Small States of Europe and it topped the table at the 1997 edition for which it was the host nation.

== Strength sports ==
Icelanders are famous for their immense success in strength sports. Strongman and powerlifting have been Iceland's greatest success in sports on an international level. Iceland has the second most World's Strongest Man championships of any country with nine: Jón Páll Sigmarsson and Magnús Ver Magnússon with four victories each and most recently by Hafþór Júlíus Björnsson, who is also widely regarded as the strongest man to have ever lived. Benedikt Magnússon broke the powerlifting world record deadlift with 460.4 kg (1,015 lb) in 2011 and Hafþór Júlíus Björnsson broke the strongman world record deadlift with 501 kg (1,105 lb) in 2020. Other notable athletes include Hjalti Árnason, Andrés Guðmundsson, Torfi Ólafsson, Kristinn Óskar 'Boris' Haraldsson, Stefán Sölvi Pétursson, Ari Gunnarsson, Páll Logason and Eyþór Ingólfsson Melsteð.

Glíma is a form of wrestling, thought to have originated with Vikings, that is still played in Iceland, and is the national sport in Iceland.

== Other sports ==
The oldest sport association in Iceland is the Reykjavik Shooting Association, founded 1867. Rifle shooting became very popular in the 19th century and was heavily encouraged by politicians and others pushing for Icelandic independence. Shooting remains popular and all types of shooting with small arms is practiced in the country.

Ice and rock climbing are popular sporting activities among many Icelanders; the climb up the 4,167-foot (1,270 metre) Þumall peak in Skaftafell has been a difficult one for many adventurous climbers, however mountain climbing is generally considered in Iceland to be a fairly suitable sport for the general public and is a very common type of leisure activity among Icelanders. Hvítá, among many other of the Icelandic glacial rivers, is known to attract kayakers and river rafters from around the world.

Ice hockey is gaining popularity in Iceland, with 1 in 512 of the population an ice hockey player. They have a larger 'hockey density' than Slovakia (1 in 630 people are players). The Iceland national ice hockey team has risen to 38th in the IIHF rankings, and has recently seen a fourth team added to their domestic league.

Crossfit is also one of the fastest growing sports in Iceland. Most famous athlete is the two times female champion of the crossfit games 2011 and 2012 in Carson City, Anníe Mist Þórisdóttir. Iceland has the second most podium finishers at the Crossfit Games of any country in the sport of Crossfit, with Þórisdóttir finishing first in 2011 and 2012, 2nd in 2014 as well as third in 2017, Katrín Davídsdóttir finishing first in 2015 and 2016, 2nd in 2020 and 3rd in 2018, Ragnheiður Sara Sigmundsdóttir finishing third in 2015 and 2016, and Björgvin Karl Guðmundsson finishing third in both 2015 and 2019.

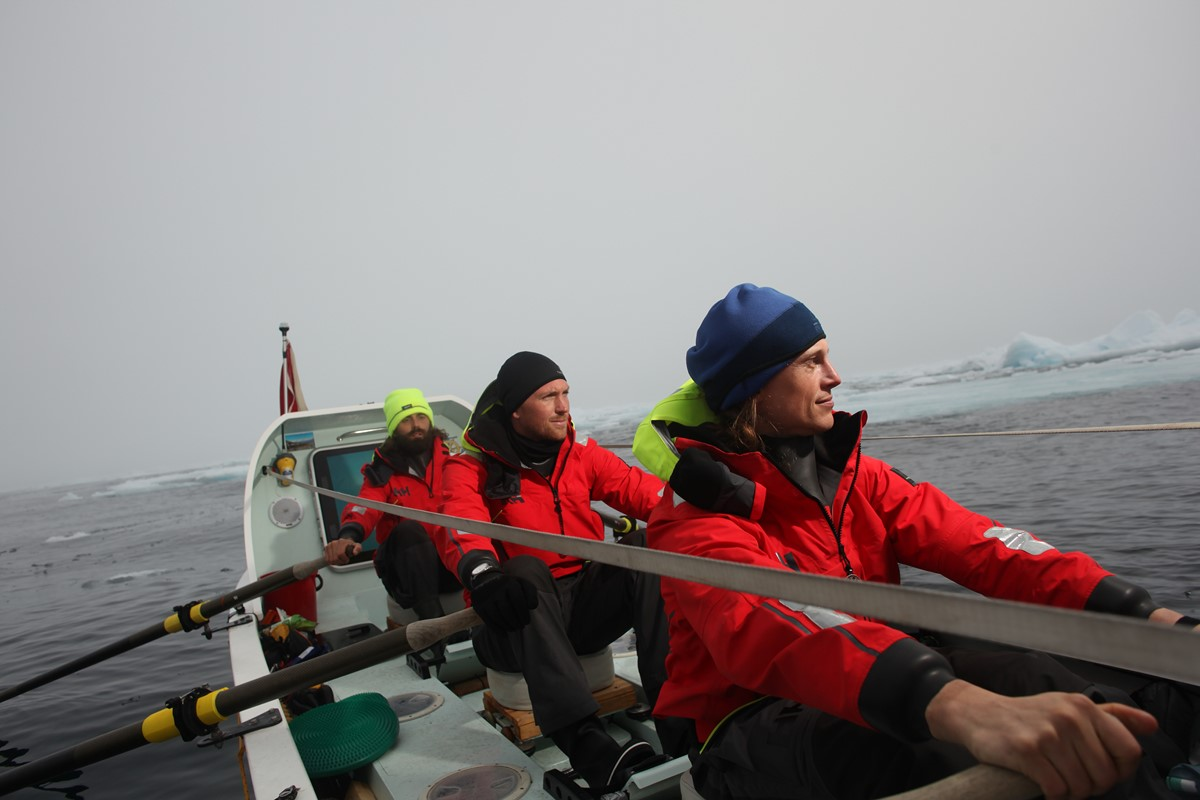
Arctic Ocean Rowing

Iceland is also one of the leading countries in ocean rowing. Icelandic explorer and endurance athlete, Fiann Paul became the world's most record-breaking explorer, and holds the world's highest number of performance-based Guinness World Records ever achieved within a single athletic discipline. As of 2020, he is the first and only person to achieve the Ocean Explorers Grand Slam (performing open-water crossings on each of the five oceans using human-powered vessels) and has claimed overall speed Guinness World Records for the fastest rowing of all four oceans (Atlantic, Indian, Pacific and Arctic) in a human-powered row boat. He had claimed a total of 41, including 33 performance based Guinness World Records by 2020.

Iceland's handball team is one of the top-ranked teams in the world, winning the silver medal at the 2008 Summer Olympics in Beijing, China, and a bronze medal in the 2010 European Championship. Icelandic women are good at football, the national team is ranked eighteenth by FIFA.

Archery as a sport started in disabled clubs in Iceland 1974 and has grown particularly since 2013, buoyed by the opening of a new facility in Kópavogur that year. Archery is one of the oldest Viking sports in Iceland.

In golf, Ólafía Þórunn Kristinsdóttir has played full-time in the LPGA Tour.

== See also ==
- Iceland at the Olympics
- Football in Iceland
- Cricket in Iceland
- Glíma
- Handball
