= Audunn Jónsson =

Icelandic strongman

Personal information
- Nationality: Icelandic
- Born: 26 August 1972 (age 53)
- Occupation(s): Powerlifter and Strongman
- Height: 5 ft 11 in (1.80 m)
- Weight: 100–145 kg (220–320 lb)
Medal record
Strongman
Representing Iceland
Strongman Super Series
10th	2005 Met-Rx Grand Prix
Iceland's Strongest Man
2nd	1999 Iceland's Strongest Man
3rd	2000 Iceland's Strongest Man
2nd	2002 Iceland's Strongest Man
2nd	2003 Iceland's Strongest Man
3rd	2004 Iceland's Strongest Man
Iceland's Strongest Viking
2nd	2000 Iceland's Strongest Viking
3rd	2003 Iceland's Strongest Viking

Audunn Jónsson
Medal record
Representing Iceland
Powerlifting
KRAFT Championships
5th	1989 Bikarmót í kraftlyftingum	100kg
1st	1994 Íslandsmeistaramót unglinga í kraftlyftingum	100kg
1st	1995 Bikarmót í kraftlyftingum	110kg
1st	1996 Íslandsmeistaramót í kraftlyftingum	110kg
1st	1997 Íslandsmeistaramót í kraftlyftingum	125kg
1st	1998 Íslandsmeistaramót í kraftlyftingum	125kg
1st	1998 Bikarmót í kraftlyftingum	125kg
1st	1998 Reykjanesmót í kraftlyftingum	125kg
1st	1999 Íslandsmeistaramót í kraftlyftingum	125kg
1st	2000 Íslandsmeistaramót í kraftlyftingum	125kg
1st	2002 Íslandsmeistaramót í kraftlyftingum	125kg+
1st	2004 Íslandsmeistaramót í kraftlyftingum	125kg
1st	2004 Reykjanesmót í kraftlyftingum	125kg+
1st	2005 Íslandsmeistaramót í kraftlyftingum	125kg+
1st	2006 Íslandsmeistaramót í kraftlyftingum	125kg+
1st	2009 Íslandsmeistaramót í kraftlyftingum	125kg+
1st	2010 Íslandsmeistaramót í kraftlyftingum	125kg+
1st	2012 Íslandsmeistaramót í kraftlyftingum	125kg+
EPF European Powerlifting Championships
2nd	1991 Bikarmót í kraftlyftingum	110kg
3rd	1992 Bikarmót í kraftlyftingum	90kg
1st	1997 Men's European Powerlifting Championships	125kg
3rd	2003 Men's European Powerlifting Championships	110kg
3rd	2010 Nordic Powerlifting Championships	125kg+
3rd	2013 European Open Powerlifting Championships	125kg+
1st	2014 Nordic Powerlifting Championships	120kg
IPF World Championships
2nd	1993 World Juniors Powerlifting Championships	125kg
2nd	1995 World Juniors Powerlifting Championships	125kg
3rd	1996 Men's World Powerlifting Championships	110kg
2nd	1998 Men's World Powerlifting Championships	125kg
2nd	1999 Men's World Powerlifting Championships	125kg

Audunn Jónsson (born 26 August 1972), is an Icelandic retired powerlifter and a strongman from Kópavogur.

He is currently the head coach of the Icelandic powerlifting team.

== Career ==
=== Powerlifting ===
Audunn lifted heavy since his childhood, and entered his first powerlifting competition in 1986 at the age of 13. Since then he competed prolifically across IPF, EPF, NAPF, KRAFT and USAPL for 30 years, establishing more than 172 national, regional and international records in different age and weight categories until his retirement in 2015 at the age of 42.

In 2006, he became the world champion in 125 kg weight class when he totaled 1,040 kg (2,293 lb) at the world championships in Stavanger, Norway and 13 of his career records remain unbeaten to-date.

=== Strongman ===
As a strongman, Audunn was regularly invited to the sports main national title, the Iceland's Strongest Man competition and is a 5 time podium finisher, emerging runner-up and second runner-up behind Magnús Ver Magnússon, Benedikt Magnússon, Magnus Magnusson and Gunnar Þór Guðjónsson.

== Personal records ==
- Squat (equipped/ single ply) – 432.5 kg (953 lb)
- Bench press (equipped/ single ply) – 300 kg (661 lb)
- Deadlift (equipped/ single ply) – 385 kg (849 lb)
- Log press (raw) – 159 kg (351 lb) (with natural and irregular log)
- Latra stones loading onto barrels – 4 stones weighing 96–177 kg (212–390 lb) in 141.84 seconds (1998 Westfjord's Viking)
- Keg toss – 20 kg (44 lb) over 4.80 metres (15 ft 9 in) (2004 Westfjord's Viking)
