= Strength athletics in Iceland =

Iceland
- Capital: Reykjavík; 64°08′N 21°56′W

Area
  - Total: 103,125 km^{2} (39,817 sq mi)

Population
  - 2024 census: 377,320 (world rank: 180th)
  - Density: 3.66/km^{2} (9.5/sq mi)
- ISO 3166 code: IS

Strength athletics in Iceland refers to the participation of Icelandic competitors and holding national strongman competitions. The sport's roots have a long and ancient history going back to c. 874 – 1056, with sagas about Orm Storolfsson, Finnbogi and Grettir Ásmundarson to the 18th and 19th century traditional strongmen including Snorri Björnsson, Brynjólfur Eggertsson and Gunnar Salómonsson; all the way up to the televisation of modern strongman competitions in the late 1970s.

Iceland has won nine World's Strongest Man titles and holds more strongman world records than any other country. As a result, it is regarded by sports commentators and media outlets as 'the strongest nation of the world'.

== History ==
Icelanders testing each other through tests of strength predates the introduction of Strength athletics. There had also been a number of noted powerlifters and weightlifters including Skúli Óskarsson, Óskar Sigurpálsson, Guðmundur Sigurðsson, Birgir Borgþórsson, Guðmundur Helgason and Þorsteinn Leifsson during the twentieth century. However, in the era of Strongman, Iceland has a record that belies the size of the nation's population, having won everything there is to win in the sport.

Before Iceland had its own national competition, it already had men competing on the international circuit. In 1983, the young powerlifter and bodybuilder, Jón Páll Sigmarsson entered the 1983 World's Strongest Man competition where he emerged runner-up. Sigmarsson went on to win the competition the following year and in total won the World's Strongest Man four times, and became the first man to win the title 4 times. Sigmarsson was also a 5 times World Muscle Power Classic champion, 2 times Europe's Strongest Man and winner of the Pure Strength title.

His contemporary, and good friend Hjalti Árnason, was also competing parallel to him and he won Le Defi Mark Ten International and podiumed in several competitions including World Muscle Power Classic and World Strongman Challenge.

Magnús Ver Magnússon followed in their footsteps and emulated Sigmarsson's four World's Strongest Man titles, becoming the second man to win the title 4 times. He also won World Strongman Challenge, Europe's Strongest Man and European Hercules competitions. Ver Magnússon and Árnason also won the 1989 Pure Strength team competition.

There have also been several highly acclaimed Icelandic competitors, competing across top tier international competitions including Andrés Guðmundsson, Torfi Ólafsson, Kristinn Óskar Haraldsson, Benedikt Magnússon and most notably Stefán Sölvi Pétursson who achieved fourth-place in the 2010 World's Strongest Man competition.

The next entire decade of Icelandic Strongman competitions was dominated by Hafþór Júlíus Björnsson who won the main National title 12 times in addition to winning several other national competitions multiple times and also winning 10 Giants Live tours including the Europe's Strongest Man 5 times, 9 Strongman Champions League titles, the Arnold Strongman Classic 3 consecutive times, the World's Strongest Viking 2 consecutive times, the World's Strongest Man and the World's Ultimate Strongman becoming the most decorated Icelandic Strongman of all-time.

== National Competitions ==
Since 1985, Iceland has had its own national strongman competition: Iceland's Strongest Man, which remains the main national title. Then, there has also been other major titles contested in Iceland, including Strongest Man in Iceland, Iceland's Strongest Viking, Iceland's Strongest Man (IFSA) and Icelandic Power Trial Championships; in addition to several smaller competitions such as Westfjord's Viking, Grundarfjord Viking, Highland Viking, East Coast Giant/ Eastfjord Strongman Championships and Northern Giant. Iceland also holds national Highland Games competitions such as Icelandic Highland Games, Powerlifting competitions such as Thor's Powerlifting Challenge, Magnus Classic Raw Powerlifting, and deadlift + loglift competitions such as Thor's Power Challenge.

=== Iceland's Strongest Man ===
Iceland's Strongest Man
Tournament information
- Location: Iceland
- Established: 1985; 41 years ago
- Number of tournaments: 42
- Format: Multi-event Strongman competition with 6-10 athletes
- Venue(s): Reykjavík, Kópavogur, Mosfellsbær, Selfoss, Húsafell

Current champion
- Kristján Jón Haraldsson (2026)

Iceland's Strongest Man is Iceland's main national title. In 1985, the inaugural edition of the competition was held and it was not for the faint-hearted. Three of the six competitors ended up in hospital. Jón Páll won the competition while Hjalti Árnason emerged second and Magnús Ver third. Thus, in the very first contest the podium finishers would between them go on to win the World's Strongest Man eight times, the World Muscle Power Classic seven times, the World Strongman Challenge, Le Defi Mark Ten International and numerous powerlifting titles including the super-heavyweight IPF World Powerlifting Championships. The contest's profile was immediately internationally renowned and it eventually became an open competition in some years, although if a non-Icelander wins, the title of Iceland's Strongest Man defers to the highest placed Icelander. This has only happened on 2 occasions when the legendary Bill Kazmaier of the United States and Regin Vagadal of the Faroe Islands won in 1988 and 1998 respectively.

Iceland's Strongest Man remains the most prestigious and the highest ranking strongman title of the country. Each year, the champion is bestowed with an iconic 28 kg (62 lb) trophy handcrafted from stone, which depicts a man lifting a heavy stone.

==== Results ====
Being held for 41 consecutive years since its inception in 1985, Iceland's Strongest Man is the oldest 'continuously held' strongman competition in the world. It has been won by 11 Icelanders and 7 of them progressed on to become multiple winners. With 12 titles, Hafþór Júlíus Björnsson holds the record for the most number of wins while Magnús Ver Magnússon and Jón Páll Sigmarsson have 8 and 5 wins respectively. The competition is annually organized and hosted by Hjalti Árnason.

Year	Champion	Runner-Up	3rd Place
1985	(Iceland) Jón Páll Sigmarsson	(Iceland) Hjalti Árnason	(Iceland) Magnús Ver Magnússon
1986	(Iceland) Jón Páll Sigmarsson (2)	(Iceland) Hjalti Árnason	(Iceland) Magnús Ver Magnússon
1987	(Iceland) Jón Páll Sigmarsson (3)	(Iceland) Hjalti Árnason	(Iceland) Magnús Ver Magnússon
1988	(United States) Bill Kazmaier	(Iceland) Magnús Ver Magnússon	(Iceland) Hjalti Árnason
1989	(Iceland) Magnús Ver Magnússon	(Iceland) Hjalti Árnason	(Iceland) Torfi Ólafsson
1990	(Iceland) Jón Páll Sigmarsson (4)	(Iceland) Andrés Guðmundsson	(Iceland) Hjalti Árnason
1991	(Iceland) Magnús Ver Magnússon (2)	(Iceland) Hjalti Árnason	(Iceland) Björgvin Filippusson
1992	(Iceland) Jón Páll Sigmarsson (5)	(Iceland) Andrés Guðmundsson	(Iceland) Pétur Guðmundsson
1993	(Iceland) Magnús Ver Magnússon (3)	(Iceland) Andrés Guðmundsson	(Iceland) Hjalti Árnason
1994	(Iceland) Magnús Ver Magnússon (4)	(Iceland) Andrés Guðmundsson	(Iceland) Pétur Guðmundsson
1995	(Iceland) Magnús Ver Magnússon (5)	(Iceland) Torfi Ólafsson	(Iceland) Vilhjálmur Hauksson
1996	(Iceland) Magnús Ver Magnússon (6)	(Iceland) Hjalti Árnason	(Iceland) Andrés Guðmundsson
1997	(Iceland) Torfi Ólafsson	(Iceland) Gunnar Þór Guðjónsson	(Iceland) Vilhjálmur Hauksson
1998	(Faroe Islands) Regin Vagadal	(Iceland) Gunnar Þór Guðjónsson	(Iceland) Torfi Ólafsson
1999	(Iceland) Gunnar Þór Guðjónsson	(Iceland) Audunn Jónsson	(Iceland) Torfi Ólafsson
2000	(Iceland) Gunnar Þór Guðjónsson (2)	(Iceland) Torfi Ólafsson	(Iceland) Audunn Jónsson
2001	(Iceland) Magnús Ver Magnússon (7)	(Iceland) Magnús Magnússon	(Iceland) Kristinn Óskar 'Boris' Haraldsson
2002	(Iceland) Magnus Magnusson	(Iceland) Audunn Jónsson	(Iceland) Grétar Guðmundsson
2003	(Iceland) Benedikt Magnússon	(Iceland) Audunn Jónsson	(Iceland) Grétar Guðmundsson
2004	(Iceland) Magnús Ver Magnússon (8)	(Iceland) Benedikt Magnússon	(Iceland) Audunn Jónsson
2005	(Iceland) Kristinn Oskar 'Boris' Haraldsson	(United Kingdom) Adrian Rollinson	(Iceland) Guðjón Gíslason
2006	(Iceland) Kristinn Óskar 'Boris' Haraldsson (2)	(United States) Don Pope	(Iceland) Jens Andri Fylkisson
2007	(Iceland) Kristinn Óskar 'Boris' Haraldsson (3)	(United Kingdom) Terry Hollands	(United States) Don Pope
2008	(Iceland) Kristinn Óskar 'Boris' Haraldsson (4)	(Iceland) Stefán Sölvi Pétursson	(Iceland) Orri Geirsson
2009	(Iceland) Stefán Sölvi Pétursson	(Iceland) Kristinn Óskar 'Boris' Haraldsson	(Iceland) Páll Logason
2010	(Iceland) Stefán Sölvi Pétursson (2)	(Iceland) Benedikt Magnússon	(Iceland) Hafþór Júlíus Björnsson
2011	(Iceland) Hafþór Júlíus Björnsson	(Iceland) Ari Gunnarsson	(Iceland) Páll Logason
2012	(Iceland) Hafþór Júlíus Björnsson (2)	(Iceland) Ari Gunnarsson	(Iceland) Páll Logason
2013	(Iceland) Hafþór Júlíus Björnsson (3)	(Iceland) Páll Logason	(Iceland) Ari Gunnarsson
2014	(Iceland) Hafþór Júlíus Björnsson (4)	(Iceland) Páll Logason	(Iceland) Úlfur Orri Pétursson
2015	(Iceland) Hafþór Júlíus Björnsson (5)	(Iceland) Ari Gunnarsson	(Iceland) Fannar Smári Vilhjálmsson
2016	(Iceland) Hafþór Júlíus Björnsson (6)	(Iceland) Stefán Sölvi Pétursson	(Iceland) Ari Gunnarsson
2017	(Iceland) Hafþór Júlíus Björnsson (7)	(Iceland) Ari Gunnarsson	(Iceland) Sigfús Fossdal
2018	(Iceland) Hafþór Júlíus Björnsson (8)	(Iceland) Eyþór Ingólfsson Melsteð	(Iceland) Sigfús Fossdal
2019	(Iceland) Hafþór Júlíus Björnsson (9)	(United Kingdom) Tom Stoltman	(United Kingdom) Luke Stoltman
2020	(Iceland) Hafþór Júlíus Björnsson (10)	(Iceland) Eyþór Ingólfsson Melsteð	(Iceland) Ari Gunnarsson
2021	(Iceland) Stefán Karel Torfason	(Iceland) Eyþór Ingólfsson Melsteð	(Iceland) Kristján Sindri Níelsson
2022	(Iceland) Kristján Jón Haraldsson	(Iceland) Stefán Karel Torfason	(Iceland) Páll Logason
2023	(Iceland) Kristján Jón Haraldsson (2)	(Iceland) Vilius Jokužys	(Iceland) Theodór Már Guðmundsson
2024	(Iceland) Hafþór Júlíus Björnsson (11)	(Iceland) Pálmi Guðfinnsson	(Iceland) Hilmar Örn Jónsson
2025	(Iceland) Hafþór Júlíus Björnsson (12)	(United Kingdom) Paddy Haynes	(Ghana) Evans Nana
2026	(Iceland) Kristján Jón Haraldsson (3)	(Iceland) Hafþór Júlíus Björnsson	(Iceland) Vilius Jokužys

==== Champions breakdown ====
Champion	Times	Years
(Iceland) Hafþór Júlíus Björnsson	12 (10 consecutive)	2011, 2012, 2013, 2014, 2015, 2016, 2017, 2018, 2019, 2020, 2024, 2025
(Iceland) Magnús Ver Magnússon	8 (4 consecutive)	1989, 1991, 1993, 1994, 1995, 1996, 2001, 2004
(Iceland) Jón Páll Sigmarsson	5 (3 consecutive)	1985, 1986, 1987, 1990, 1992
(Iceland) Kristinn Óskar 'Boris' Haraldsson	4 (consecutive)	2005, 2006, 2007, 2008
(Iceland) Kristján Jón Haraldsson	3 (2 consecutive)	2022, 2023, 2026
(Iceland) Gunnar Þór Guðjónsson	2 (consecutive)	1999, 2000
(Iceland) Stefán Sölvi Pétursson	2 (consecutive)	2009, 2010
(Iceland) Torfi Ólafsson	1	1997
(Iceland) Magnús Magnússon	1	2002
(Iceland) Benedikt Magnússon	1	2003
(Iceland) Stefán Karel Torfason	1	2021
(United States) Bill Kazmaier	1	1988
(Faroe Islands) Regin Vágadal	1	1998

==== Most podium finishes without winning the title ====
Athlete	Times (breakdown)
(Iceland) Hjalti Árnason	9 (6x 2nd, 3x 3rd)
(Iceland) Ari Gunnarsson	7 (4x 2nd, 3x 3rd)
(Iceland) Páll Logason	6 (2x 2nd, 4x 3rd)
(Iceland) Andrés Guðmundsson	5 (4x 2nd, 1x 3rd)
(Iceland) Audunn Jónsson	5 (3x 2nd, 2x 3rd)
(Iceland) Eyþór Ingólfsson Melsteð	3 (3x 2nd)
(Iceland) Pétur Guðmundsson	2 (2x 3rd)
(Iceland) Vilhjálmur Hauksson	2 (2x 3rd)
(Iceland) Grétar Guðmundsson	2 (2x 3rd)
(Iceland) Sigfús Fossdal	2 (2x 3rd)

Following men have reached either 4th or 5th place in the competition: Guðni Sigurjónsson, Flósi Jónsson, Jón Gunnarsson, Kjartan Guðbransson, Guðmundur Sigurðsson, Arnar Már Jónsson, Unnar Garðarsson, Sæmundur Sæmundsson, Svavar Einarsson, Jón Valgeir Williams, Ólafur Eyjólfsson, Ingvar Ingvarsson, Jón Björn Björnsson, Georg Rúnar Ögmundsson, Þorvaldur Kristbergsson, Sturla Ólafsson, Jón Þór Ásgrímsson, Skúli Ármannsson, Tómas Darri Þorsteinsson, Kristján Páll Árnason and Kári Elíasson.

=== Strongest Man in Iceland ===
The second major title of Iceland, this contest is organized by Magnús Ver Magnússon and is also held in different locations throughout Iceland. In the past, it has been held in Grindavík, Sudureyri, Grafarvogur and Hafnarfjördur. Unlike in Iceland's Strongest Man, if a non-Icelander wins this competition, he will be conferred with the title 'Strongest Man in Iceland'.

Year	Champion	Runner-Up	3rd Place
2010	(Iceland) Hafþór Júlíus Björnsson	(Iceland) Benedikt Magnússon	(Iceland) Ólafur Valur Guðjónsson
2011	(Iceland) Hafþór Júlíus Björnsson	(Iceland) Ari Gunnarsson	(Iceland) Georg Ögmundsson
2012	(Iceland) Hafþór Júlíus Björnsson	(Iceland) Ari Gunnarsson	(Iceland) Páll Logason
2013	(Iceland) Ari Gunnarsson	(Iceland) Páll Logason	(Iceland) Andri Björnsson
2014	(Iceland) Georg Ögmundsson	(Iceland) Páll Logason	(Iceland) Úlfur Orri Pétursson
2016	(Iceland) Hafþór Júlíus Björnsson	(Iceland) Ari Gunnarsson	(Iceland) Stefán Sölvi Pétursson
2017	(Iceland) Hafþór Júlíus Björnsson	(Iceland) Òskar Pétur Hafstein	(Iceland) Eyþór Ingólfsson Melsteð
2018	(Iceland) Ari Gunnarsson	(Iceland) Eyþór Ingólfsson Melsteð	(Iceland) André Bachmann
2019	(Iceland) Ari Gunnarsson	(Iceland) Eyþór Ingólfsson Melsteð	(Iceland) Kristján Jón Haraldsson
2020	(Iceland) Eyþór Ingólfsson Melsteð	(Iceland) Stefán Karel Torfason	(Iceland) Òskar Pétur Hafstein
2021	(Iceland) Eyþór Ingólfsson Melsteð	(Iceland) Kristján Jón Haraldsson	(Iceland) Tómas Darri Þorsteinsson
2022	(Iceland) Kristján Jón Haraldsson	(Iceland) Vilius Jokužys	(Iceland) Theodór Már Guðmundsson
2023	(Iceland) Kristján Jón Haraldsson	(Iceland) Vilius Jokužys	(Iceland) Pálmi Guðfinnsson
2024	(Iceland) Vilius Jokužys	(Iceland) Kristján Sindri Níelsson	(Iceland) Hilmar Örn Jónsson
2025	(Iceland) Vilius Jokužys	(United States) Andrew Clayton	(Iceland) Pálmi Guðfinnsson
2026	(Iceland) Vilius Jokužys	(Sweden) Anton Wasser	(Iceland) Kristján Sindri Níelsson

=== Iceland's Strongest Viking ===
The third major title of Iceland, this contest dates back to 1992 however, in some years the results of this contest have been combined with that of Iceland's Strongest Man in order to ascertain who qualifies for the World's Strongest Man. The winner of the competition is crowned with a horned viking helmet as the trophy.

Year	Champion	Runner-Up	3rd Place
1993	(Iceland) Magnús Ver Magnússon	(Iceland) Andrés Guðmundsson	(Iceland) Guðni Sigurjónsson
1994	(Iceland) Magnús Ver Magnússon	(Iceland) Hjalti Árnason	(Iceland) Andrés Guðmundsson
1999	(Iceland) Gunnar Þór Guðjónsson	(Iceland) Magnús Ver Magnússon	(Iceland) Svavar Már Einarsson
2000	(Iceland) Magnús Ver Magnússon	(Iceland) Audunn Jónsson	(Iceland) Svavar Már Einarsson
2001	(Iceland) Magnús Ver Magnússon	(Iceland) Guðmundur Otri Sigurðsson	(Iceland) Jón Valgeir Williams
2002	(Iceland) Magnús Ver Magnússon	(Iceland) Jón Valgeir Williams	(Iceland) Magnús Magnússon
2003	(Iceland) Magnús Ver Magnússon	(Iceland) Jón Valgeir Williams	(Iceland) Audunn Jónsson
2004	(Iceland) Magnús Ver Magnússon	(Iceland) Benedikt Magnússon	(Iceland) Jón Valgeir Williams
2005	(Iceland) Magnús Ver Magnússon	(Iceland) Magnus Magnusson	(Iceland) Georg Ögmundsson
2006	(Iceland) Stefán Sölvi Pétursson	(Iceland) Georg Ögmundsson	(Iceland) Jón Valgeir Williams
2007	(Iceland) Benedikt Magnússon	(Iceland) Pétur Bruno Þorsteinsson and (Iceland) Georg Ögmundsson	
2009	(Iceland) Stefán Sölvi Pétursson	(Iceland) Páll Logason	(To be confirmed)
2010	(Iceland) Hafþór Júlíus Björnsson	(Iceland) Páll Logason	(Iceland) Ari Gunnarsson
2011	(Iceland) Hafþór Júlíus Björnsson	(Iceland) Stefán Sölvi Pétursson	(Iceland) Ari Gunnarsson
2012	(Iceland) Hafþór Júlíus Björnsson	(Iceland) Stefán Sölvi Pétursson	(Iceland) Georg Ögmundsson
2013	(Iceland) Andri Björnsson	(Iceland) Þröstur Ólason	(Iceland) Úlfur Orri Pétursson
2014	(Iceland) Georg Ögmundsson	(To be confirmed)	(To be confirmed)
2020	(Iceland) Eyþór Ingólfsson Melsteð	(Iceland) Ari Gunnarsson	(Iceland) Stefán Karel Torfason
2021	(Iceland) Ari Gunnarsson	(Iceland) Kristján Jón Haraldsson	(Iceland) Stefán Karel Torfason
2022	(Iceland) Kristján Jón Haraldsson	(Iceland) Stefán Karel Torfason	(Iceland) Kristján Sindri Níelsson
2023	(Iceland) Vilius Jokužys	(Iceland) Kristján Sindri Níelsson	(Iceland) Sigfús Fossdal
2024	(Iceland) Vilius Jokužys	(Lithuania) Audrius Jokūbaitis	(Iceland) Pálmi Guðfinnsson
2025	(Iceland) Kristján Sindri Níelsson	(Scotland) Chris Beetham	(Iceland) Pálmi Guðfinnsson
2026	(Iceland) Vilius Jokužys	(Lithuania) Audrius Jokūbaitis	(Iceland) Kristján Sindri Níelsson

=== Iceland's Strongest Man (IFSA) ===
The IFSA organised the Iceland's Strongest Man competition for a number of years before 2005. However, when the IFSA disassociated from the World's Strongest Man competition, Iceland's Strongest Man remained the official qualifier with no IFSA involvement. The IFSA did continue to promote their own version until their financial demise at the end of 2008.

Year	Champion	Runner-Up	3rd Place
1999	(Iceland) Andrés Guðmundsson	(To be confirmed)	(To be confirmed)
2005	(Iceland) Benedikt Magnússon	(To be confirmed)	(To be confirmed)
2006	(Iceland) Benedikt Magnússon	(Iceland) Stefán Sölvi Pétursson	(Iceland) Georg Ögmundsson
2007	(Iceland) Benedikt Magnússon	(Iceland) Georg Ögmundsson	(Iceland) Pétur Bruno Þorsteinsson
2008	(Iceland) Stefán Sölvi Pétursson	(Iceland) Páll Logason	(Iceland) Grétar Guðmundsson

=== Icelandic Power Trial Championships ===
This tournament was also known by the name Aflraunameistari Islands. It was held for 9 years between 1986 and 2011.

Year	Champion	Runner-Up	3rd Place
1986	(Iceland) Guðni Sveinsson	(Iceland) Víkingur Traustason	(Iceland) Flósi Jónsson
1989	(Iceland) Jón Páll Sigmarsson	(United Kingdom) Jamie Reeves	(Iceland) Magnús Ver Magnússon
1991	(Iceland) Andrés Guðmundsson	(Iceland) Björgvin Filippusson	(Iceland) Jón Gunnarsson
1992	(Iceland) Magnús Ver Magnússon	(Iceland) Andrés Guðmundsson	(Iceland) Guðni Sigurjónsson
1993	(Iceland) Andrés Guðmundsson	(Iceland) Kjartan Guðbransson	(Iceland) Magnús Bess
1995	(Iceland) Hjalti Árnason	(Iceland) Torfi Ólafsson	(Iceland) Unnar Garðarsson
2008	(Iceland) Sigfús Fossdal	(Iceland) Páll Logason	(Iceland) Orri Geirsson
2009	(Iceland) Sigfús Fossdal	(Iceland) Úlfur Orri Pétursson	(Iceland) Jón Þór Ásgrímsson
2011	(Iceland) Sigfús Fossdal	(Iceland) Árni Freyr Stefánsson	(Iceland) Jón Þór Ásgrímsson

=== Other competitions ===
- Westfjord's Viking (Vestfjarðarvíkingin)
- Grundarfjord Viking (Grundarfjarðartröllið)
- Highland Viking (Upsveitarvíkingin)
- East Coast Giant/ Eastfjord Strongman Championships (Austfjarðartröllið)
- Northern Giant (Norðurlandsjakinn)
- Icelandic Highland Games
- Thor's Powerlifting Challenge
- Magnus Classic Raw Powerlifting
- Thor's Power Challenge

=== Iceland's Strongest Woman ===
Iceland's Strongest Woman has been held since 1995 through different organizers, but from 2019 onwards Sigfús Fossdal took over and held the competition in Akureyri. In 2025, it was held in Kópavogur.

Year	Champion	Runner-Up	3rd Place
1995	(Iceland) Bryndís Ólafsdóttir	(To be confirmed)	(To be confirmed)
1996	(Iceland) Bryndís Ólafsdóttir	(To be confirmed)	(To be confirmed)
1997	(Iceland) Bryndís Ólafsdóttir	(To be confirmed)	(To be confirmed)
1998	(Iceland) Bryndís Ólafsdóttir	(To be confirmed)	(To be confirmed)
2009	(Iceland) Jóhanna Eivinsdóttir	(To be confirmed)	(To be confirmed)
2010	(Iceland) Thora Thorsteinsdóttir	(To be confirmed)	(To be confirmed)
2011	(Iceland) Bryndís Ólafsdóttir	(Iceland) Thora Thorsteinsdóttir	(Iceland) Jóhanna Eivinsdóttir
2012	(Iceland) Bryndís Ólafsdóttir	(To be confirmed)	(To be confirmed)
2013	(Iceland) Thora Thorsteinsdóttir	(To be confirmed)	(To be confirmed)
2014	(Iceland) Ingibjörg Lilja	(To be confirmed)	(To be confirmed)
2015	(Iceland) Jóhanna Eivinsdóttir	(To be confirmed)	(To be confirmed)
2016	(Iceland) Ingibjörg Óladóttir	(Iceland) Anna Björg Hjaltadóttir	(Iceland) Ragnheiður Jónasdóttir (Iceland) Hún Zane Kauzena
2017	(Iceland) Hún Zane Kauzena	(Iceland) Ragnheiður Jónasdóttir	(Iceland) Berglind Rós Bergsdóttir
2018	(Iceland) Ragnheiður Jónasdóttir	(Iceland) Ellen Lind Ísaksdóttir	(To be confirmed)
2019	(Iceland) Ellen Lind Ísaksdóttir	(Iceland) Ragnheiður Jónasdóttir	(Iceland) Lilja B Jónsdóttir
2020	(Iceland) Ellen Lind Ísaksdóttir	(Iceland) Ragnheiður Jónasdóttir	(Iceland) Lilja B Jónsdóttir
2021	(Iceland) Ellen Lind Ísaksdóttir	(Iceland) Ragnheiður Jónasdóttir	(Iceland) Lilja B Jónsdóttir
2022	(Iceland) Ragnheiður Jónasdóttir	(Iceland) Ellen Lind Ísaksdóttir	(Iceland) Erika Mjöll Jónsdóttir
2023	(Iceland) Ragnheiður Jónasdóttir	(Iceland) Erika Mjöll Jónsdóttir	(Iceland) Lilja B Jónsdóttir
2024	(Iceland) Ragnheiður Jónasdóttir	(Iceland) Erika Mjöll Jónsdóttir	(Iceland) Berglind Rós Bergsdóttir
2025	(Iceland) Berglind Rós Bergsdóttir	(Iceland) Svala Björgvinsdóttir	(Iceland) Elín Birna Hallgrímsdóttir

== Regional Competitions ==
=== Nordic Strongman Championships ===
Nordic Strongman Championships consists of athletes from Iceland, Norway, Sweden, Finland and Denmark.

Year	Champion	Runner-Up	3rd Place
2005	(Norway) Svend Karlsen	(Sweden) Magnus Samuelsson	(Finland) Juha-Matti Räsänen
2012	(Sweden) Johannes Årsjö	(Norway) Lars Rorbakken	(Denmark) Mikkel Leicht
2013	(Sweden) Johannes Årsjö	(Norway) Ole Martin Hansen	(Finland) Juha-Matti Järvi

- In 2005, the competition was held under IFSA in Kristiansand, and in 2012 and 2013 in Harstad, Norway under Giants Live.
- From 2014 onwards, the competition was promoted to global level, re-titled as the World's Strongest Viking and was held consecutively for 8 years under Strongman Champions League.

== International Competitions ==
=== Jón Páll Sigmarsson Classic ===
The competition was organized by Hjalti Árnason to commemorate Jón Páll Sigmarsson, and 3 tournaments were held from 2010 to 2012 with the participation of the top athletes of the world.

Year	Champion	Runner-Up	3rd Place
2010	(United States) Brian Shaw	(Iceland) Hafþór Júlíus Björnsson	(United Kingdom) Mark Felix
2011	(United States) Brian Shaw	(United Kingdom) Laurence Shahlaei	(Iceland) Páll Logason
2012	(Iceland) Hafþór Júlíus Björnsson	(United Kingdom) Mark Felix	(Iceland) Páll Logason

=== Magnús Ver Magnússon Strongman Classic ===
The competition is noted for its vintage events and is held annually outdoors during winter season.

Year	Champion	Runner-Up	3rd Place
2021	(Canada) Maxime Boudreault	(Iceland) Eyþór Ingólfsson Melsteð	(Finland) Sami Ahola
2022	(Australia) Rongo Keene	(Canada) Maxime Boudreault	(Iceland) Eyþór Ingólfsson Melsteð
2023	(Canada) Tristain Hoath	(Australia) Rongo Keene	(United Kingdom) Shane Flowers
2024	(Poland) Mateusz Kieliszkowski	(Canada) Tristain Hoath	(United States) Andrew Burton
2025	(United States) Levi Strong	(Australia) Jordan Osborne	(United States) Lucas Hatton

=== Giants Live ===
Iceland was also the venue for one of Giants Live grand prix competitions with the participation of top athletes of the world. The competition was named Giants Live Viking Challenge/ Giants Live Iceland.

Year	Champion	Runner-Up	3rd Place
2015	(Iceland) Hafþór Júlíus Björnsson	(United Kingdom) Mark Felix	(United States) Martins Licis

== See also ==
- Strength athletics
- Strongman
