= Páll Logason =

Icelandic strongman

Personal information
- Nationality: Icelandic
- Born: 31 January 1986 (age 40) Reykjavík
- Occupation: Strongman
- Height: 5 ft 9 in (1.75 m)
- Weight: 135–150 kg (298–331 lb)
Medal record
Strongman
Representing Iceland
Jón Páll Sigmarsson Classic
7th	2010 Jón Páll Sigmarsson Classic
3rd	2011 Jón Páll Sigmarsson Classic
3rd	2012 Jón Páll Sigmarsson Classic
Giants Live
7th	2013 Giants Live Norway
Iceland's Strongest Man
3rd	2009 Iceland's Strongest Man
3rd	2011 Iceland's Strongest Man
3rd	2012 Iceland's Strongest Man
2nd	2013 Iceland's Strongest Man
2nd	2014 Iceland's Strongest Man
5th	2017 Iceland's Strongest Man
3rd	2022 Iceland's Strongest Man
Iceland's Strongest Man (IFSA)
2nd	2008
Strongest Man in Iceland
3rd	2012
2nd	2013
2nd	2014
Iceland's Strongest Viking
2nd	2009
2nd	2010
Eastfjord Strongman Championships
1st	2009
Icelandic Power Trial Championships
2nd	2008

Páll Logason
Medal record
Representing Iceland
Powerlifting
WPF Junior World Championships
1st	2008 WPF Junior World Championships	140kg
1st	2009 WPF Junior World Championships	140kg
RAW-Iceland Íslandsmót
1st	2010 Íslandsmót	+140kg
1st	2011 Íslandsmót	+140kg
2nd	2013 Fógetamótið	140kg
WPC-Iceland Icelandic Championships
1st	2008 Íslandsmeistaramót	140kg
2nd	2008 I.C.	140kg
1st	2008 Óðinsmót	140kg
1st	2009 BK Push-Pull	140kg
1st	2010 I.C. II	140kg
1st	2010 I.C.	+140kg
IKF Icelandic Championships
2nd	2008 I.C. Bench Press	125kg
1st	2008 I.C.	140kg
1st	2008 Canada vs. Iceland	140kg
1st	2010 Heildarúrslit	125kg
1st	2012 Icelandic Cup	+140kg

Páll Ingvi Logason (born 31 January 1986), also known as 'Fermeter' (Square-meter in English), is an Icelandic powerlifter and a strongman from Garðabær.

== Career ==
Páll was passionate about lifting heavy weights since his teenage years and trained together with the likes of Stefán Sölvi Pétursson, Benedikt Magnússon and a young Hafþór Júlíus Björnsson at the 'Strongman Base' and 'Jakaból' gyms.

He entered his first powerlifting competition in 2007. At the 2008 World Powerlifting Federation – World Championships in Austria, he totaled 1,000 kg (single ply equipment) and won the Juniors (20–23) category; and the following year at the 2009 World Powerlifting Federation – World Championships in the United States, he improved his total to 1,035 kg and again won the Juniors (20–23) category. At the 2012 IKF Icelandic Cup, he totaled 1,025 kg (raw) with a 400 kg squat, 250 kg bench press, 375 kg deadlift and a 551.7 Dots score. From 2008 to 2012, Páll won a total of 13 powerlifting competitions.

As a strongman, Páll won 3rd place consecutively at the Jón Páll Sigmarsson Classic in 2011 and 2012. He is also a regular entrant to the Iceland's Strongest Man competition and a 6 time podium finisher, emerging the runner up twice behind Hafþór Júlíus Björnsson in 2013 and 2014.

He won 2009 Eastfjord Strongman Championships (also called 'East Coast Giant') and 2010 Icelandic Loglift Championships.

In 2011, he became the first Icelander to squat 400 kg (882 lb) raw.

== Personal life ==
Páll graduated from the University of Iceland with a B.Sc in Engineering Technology, and works at Smith og Norland, Reykjavik.

He is married to Linda Björk Rögnvaldsdóttir and they have two children.

== Personal records ==
Powerlifting
During full competitions

- Squat – 400 kg (882 lb) (Raw with wraps) (2012 IKF Icelandic Cup)
- Bench press – 250 kg (551 lb) (Raw) (2012 IKF Icelandic Cup)
- Bench press – 280 kg (617 lb) (in single-ply equipment) (2009 WPF World Championships)
- Deadlift – 375 kg (827 lb) (Raw) (2012 IKF Icelandic Cup)
- Total – 1,025 kg (2,260 lb) (Raw with wraps) (400 + 250 + 375 kg (882 + 551 + 827 lb)) (2012 IKF Icelandic Cup)

During training

- Squat – 405 kg (893 lb) (Raw with wraps)
- Bench press – 290 kg (639 lb) (in single-ply equipment)

Strongman

- Deadlift – 390 kg (860 lb) (Raw, with lifting straps)
- Hummer Tyre Deadlift (15 in from the floor) – 442.5 kg (976 lb) (Raw, with lifting straps)
- Car Deadlift – 345 kg (761 lb) x 6 reps
- Log press – 180 kg (397 lb)
- Axle press – 170 kg (375 lb)
- Alfa-stein (stone) carry – 168 kg (370 lb) for 59.50 metres (195 ft 3 in)
- Weight over bar – 25.5 kg (56 lb) over 5.04 metres (16 ft 6 in)
- Metal block throw – 20 kg (44 lb) for 6.92 metres (22 ft 8 in)
- Farmer's walk – 165 kg (364 lb) in each hand (25 meter course) in 13.17 seconds (Raw grip)
