= Jón Valgeir Williams =

Icelandic strongman (born 1973)

Personal information
- Nationality: Icelandic
- Born: 25 November 1973 (age 52)
- Occupation: Strongman
- Height: 6 ft 5 in (1.96 m)
- Weight: 155-165 kg (341-364 lb)
Medal record
Strongman
Representing Iceland
World's Strongest Man
Qualified	2002 World's Strongest Man
Qualified	2003 World's Strongest Man
IFSA Grand Prix
6th	2001 Atlantic Giant
7th	2002 IFSA Nordic Championships
22nd	2003 IFSA All Strength Challenge
Viking Challenge
6th	2002 Viking Challenge
Iceland's Strongest Man
4th	2001 Iceland's Strongest Man
7th	2004 Iceland's Strongest Man
Iceland's Strongest Viking
3rd	2001 Iceland's Strongest Viking
2nd	2002 Iceland's Strongest Viking
2nd	2003 Iceland's Strongest Viking
3rd	2004 Iceland's Strongest Viking
4th	2005 Iceland's Strongest Viking
3rd	2006 Iceland's Strongest Viking
Eastfjord Strongman Championships
1st	2002 Eastfjord Strongman Championships

Jón Valgeir Williams is a competitive Strongman and Powerlifter from Iceland.

== Early life ==
Jón Valgeir was born in England to an English father and an Icelandic mother. At the age of 3, when his father tragically died in a diving accident, his mother moved with him to her native Iceland.

== Career ==
Jón Valgeir played Basketball and started strength training at a young age where he was spotted by Hjalti Árnason. Throughout the 2000s, he was Magnús Ver Magnússon's main training partner at Jón Páll Sigmarsson's 'Gym 80'. He emerged second place twice and third place thrice at the Iceland's Strongest Viking and won the 2002 Eastfjord Strongman Championships.

Jón Valgeir is a two-time entrant to the World's Strongest Man where he placed third in 2002 group 4 in Kuala Lumpur, Malaysia, and fifth in 2003 group 4 in Victoria Falls, Zambia.

== Personal records ==
- Atlas Stones – 5 Stones weighing 100–160 kg (220–353 lb) in 36.91 seconds (2002 Viking Challenge)
- Viking press (for reps) – 121 kg (267 lb) x 8 reps (2002 WSM Group 4)
- Super Yoke – 335 kg (739 lb) for 20 meters in 28.61 seconds (2002 IFSA Nordic Championships)
- Tyre Flip – 400 kg (882 lb) Tyre for 25 meters in 27.96 seconds (2003 WSM Group 4)
- Fingal's Fingers – 5 fingers 200–300 kg (441–661 lb) in 59.36 seconds (2002 WSM Group 4)
- Keg toss – 20 kg (44 lb) over 5.10 metres (16 ft 9 in) (2004 Westfjord's Viking)
- Train pull – 16,000 kg (35,274 lb) for 16 meters in 74.78 seconds (2003 WSM Group 4)

== Other ventures ==
Jón Valgeir is the founder of 'Valgeirs Strengthtrips' travel company which specializes in arranging customized guided tours to explore Icelandic Viking culture and stone lifting heritage.
