= Magnus Magnusson (disambiguation) =

Magnus Magnusson (1929–2007) was an Icelandic-born and British-based television presenter, journalist, translator and writer.

Magnus Magnusson may also refer to:

- Magnus Magnusson, Earl of Orkney, Earl of Orkney between 1273 and 1284
- Magnús Magnússon (strongman), Icelandic strongman and former winner of Iceland's Strongest Man
- Magnús Ver Magnússon (born 1963), Icelandic powerlifter and strongman, and four-time World's Strongest Man
- Magnús Helgi Magnússon (1922–2006), Icelandic politician
- Magnús Árni Magnússon, Icelandic academic and politician
