= Stefán Karel Torfason =

Icelandic strongman competitor and powerlifter (born 1994)

- Born: 20 April 1994 (age 32); Akureyri, Iceland
- Occupations: Strongman, powerlifter, former basketball player
- Height: 203 cm (6 ft 8 in)
- Basketball career

Career information
- Playing career: 2010–2016
- Position: Center
- Number: 4

Career history
- 2010–2011: Þór Akureyri
- 2011–2016: Snæfell
- 2016: ÍR

Stefán Karel Torfason (born 20 April 1994) is an Icelandic Strongman and a former Basketball player. Stefán became the Iceland's Strongest Man in 2021 and had 6 podium finishes in national strongman circuit. Prior to his strongman career, he was a standout basketball player and a member of the Icelandic national basketball team.

== Biography ==
Stefán was born in Akureyri. His father Torfi Ólafsson is a former Icelandic strongman and fellow Iceland's Strongest Man champion. Stefán stands 203 cm (6 ft 8 in) and weighed 150 kg (330 lb) during his strongman peak.

=== Basketball career ===
Stefán began at early age competing in basketball for his local club Þór Akureyri. He joined Snæfell in Stykkishólmur in 2010 and ÍR in 2016. In 2013, Stefán played 5 games for the Icelandic national basketball team. He was forced to retire from basketball in 2016 after his fourth concussion on doctors recommendation.

=== Strongman career ===
Competition record

Strongman

Representing Iceland

Magnús Ver Magnússon Strongman Classic
6th	2022 Magnús Classic

Iceland's Strongest Man
8th	2018 Iceland's Strongest Man
4th	2020 Iceland's Strongest Man
1st	2021 Iceland's Strongest Man
2nd	2022 Iceland's Strongest Man

Strongest Man in Iceland
2nd	2020

Iceland's Strongest Viking
3rd	2020
3rd	2021
2nd	2022

Following his retirement from basketball, Stefán focused to become a strongman like his father. He started at 2017 Ultimate Strongman Junior World Championships and gradually excelled in the national circuit, emerging third at 2020 Iceland's Strongest Viking and second at 2020 Strongest Man in Iceland. The following year he won 2021 Iceland's Strongest Man becoming the 12th man (and 10th Icelander) to win the title. In his inaugural international competition, he placed sixth at 2022 Magnús Ver Magnússon Strongman Classic.

== Personal records ==
- Deadlift – 360 kg (794 lb) (2023 Strongest Man in Iceland)
- Log press – 150 kg (331 lb) (2023 Iceland's Strongest Viking)
- Dumbbell press – 90 kg (198 lb) x 5 reps (2022 Iceland's Strongest Viking)
- Húsafell Stone carry (around the pen) – 186 kg (410 lb) for 70.90 metres (232 ft 7 in) (around 2.1 revolutions) (2022 Magnús Ver Magnússon Classic)
- Thor's Hammer toss – 21 kg (46 lb) for 9.90 metres (32 ft 6 in) (2022 Magnús Ver Magnússon Strongman Classic) (World Record)
