= Gunnar Thor =

Icelandic former strongman competitor (born 1963)

Personal information
- Born: Gunnar Thor Gudjonsson; 11 February 1963 (age 63) Sweden
- Occupation(s): Strongman; Bodybuilding
- Spouse: Anne-Mette Glerup
- Children: Alma Thorun; Valdemar Örn
Medal record
Strongman
Representing Iceland
World's Strongest Man
Qualified	1998 World's Strongest Man
Iceland's Strongest Man
2nd	1997 Iceland's Strongest Man
2nd	1998 Iceland's Strongest Man
1st	1999 Iceland's Strongest Man
1st	2000 Iceland's Strongest Man

Gunnar Þór Guðjónsson is an Icelandic former strongman competitor who won the title of Iceland's Strongest Man, and competed at the World's Strongest Man and then went on to become a champion bodybuilder.

== Biography ==
Gunnar Thor Gudjonsson known as Gunnar Thor, won the title Hercules of "The Old Town" from 1992 to 1994 and from 1996 to 1998. In 1998 he came second in the renowned Iceland's Strongest Man, an event that despite its name had for a number of years been open to international competitors. In 1998 he was invited to the World's Strongest Man competition but did not make it past the qualifying heat. A win in Iceland's Strongest Man in 2000 led to another invitation in 2000 but he was unable to attend due to injury and Torfi Olafsson took his place. This injury led to Gunnar reassessing his sporting career and he became a bodybuilder. He won the Danish Male Bodybuilding title in 2001, as well as the Nordic Male Bodybuilding and the Scandinavian Bodybuilding Grand Prix titles in the same year. He competed in the heavy weight (90+ kg) class.

== Competition history ==
- 1997
  - 2. - Iceland's Strongest Man
- 1998
  - 2. - Iceland's Strongest Man
- 1999
  - 1. - Iceland's Strongest Man
- 2000
  - 1. - Iceland's Strongest Man
  - 4. - Iceland's Strongest Viking
