= Kristján Jón Haraldsson =

Icelandic strongman

Personal information
- Nationality: Icelandic
- Born: 3 June 1998 (age 28)
- Occupation: Strongman
- Height: 6 ft 3 in (1.91 m)
- Weight: 150 kg (331 lb)
Medal record
Strongman
Representing Iceland
World's Strongest Man
Qualified	2023 World's Strongest Man
Magnús Ver Magnússon Strongman Classic
4th	2021 Magnús Classic
11th	2022 Magnús Classic
Iceland's Strongest Man
5th	2018 Iceland's Strongest Man
4th	2021 Iceland's Strongest Man
1st	2022 Iceland's Strongest Man
1st	2023 Iceland's Strongest Man
1st	2026 Iceland's Strongest Man
Strongest Man in Iceland
8th	2018
3rd	2019
2nd	2021
1st	2022
1st	2023
Iceland's Strongest Viking
2nd	2021
1st	2022
4th	2023

Kristján Jón Haraldsson (born 3 June 1998) is an Icelandic strongman from Reykjavík and a 3 x times Iceland's Strongest Man.

== Career ==
Kristján entered the national strongman circuit in 2018 and within the next three years managed to emerge runner-up at the 2021 Strongest Man in Iceland and Iceland's Strongest Viking competitions. In the same year he participated in his first international competition, Magnús Ver Magnússon Strongman Classic and secured fourth place out of fourteen athletes.

In 2022, Kristján won Iceland's Strongest Viking, Strongest Man in Iceland and Iceland's most prestigious national title Iceland's Strongest Man, becoming only the second Icelander in history after Hafþór Júlíus Björnsson to win the three major national competitions in the same calendar year. This achievement earned him an invitation to the 2023 World's Strongest Man competition, where he managed a fifth-place finish in the qualifying heat.

In 2023, Kristján won his second Strongest Man in Iceland competition and his second Iceland's Strongest Man competition, becoming only the seventh Icelander to win the title back to back.

== Personal records ==
- Deadlift (Equipped) – 400 kg (882 lb) (during training)
- Deadlift (Raw) – 280 kg (617 lb) (2018 Thor's Powerlifting Challenge)
- Squat (Raw w/wraps) – 260 kg (573 lb) (2018 Thor's Powerlifting Challenge)
- Bench press (Raw) – 210 kg (463 lb) (2018 Thor's Powerlifting Challenge)
- Log press – 170 kg (375 lb) (during training)
- Atlas stones – 4 stones 120–202 kg (265–445 lb) in 16.59 seconds (2023 Iceland's Strongest Man)
- Húsafell Stone carry (around the pen) – 186 kg (410 lb) for 58.90 metres (193 ft 3 in) (around 1.7 revolutions) (2022 Magnús Ver Magnússon Classic)
- Leggstein (tombstone) carry – 220 kg (485 lb) for 6 revolutions around the plinth (2021 Westfjord's Viking) (World Record)
- Overhead stone press – 112 kg (247 lb) (2022 Magnús Ver Magnússon Strongman Classic)
- Conan's wheel – 200 kg (441 lb) for 524° (2023 World's Strongest Man, Group 2)
