= World Strongman Challenge =

Tournament information
- Location: Various. Last held Tulsa, Oklahoma
- Established: 1987
- Final year: 2006
- Format: Multi-event competition

Final champion
- (Lithuania) Žydrūnas Savickas

The World Strongman Challenge was one of the most enduring annual strongmen competitions, running in various guises for twenty years, with only two years break. In that time it attained the position of one of the most prestigious strongman contest in the world, after the World's Strongest Man and the World Muscle Power Classic. As with its two international counterparts it attracted the top quality strength athletes of its era, which included every winner of the World's Strongest Man competition from 1980 onwards including Jón Páll Sigmarsson, Geoff Capes and Bill Kazmaier from the 1980s right up to the current WSM champion Žydrūnas Savickas.

== History ==
The World Strongman Challenge (WMPC) first took place in 1987. It was a third major strongman competition with the previously established World's Strongest Man and World Muscle Power Classic having made the popularity of strongman competitions a huge success. The WSC in fact helped fill a void left in 1987 by the absence of the World's Strongest Man event and it may have even been introduced for these purpose. The event immediately attracted the very best athletes in the field and the final placings in that inaugural 1987 competition saw both Jón Páll Sigmarsson and Geoff Capes on the podium. In 1988, despite the reintroduction of WSM, the WSC continued and unlike many other strongman events of the era, the WSC managed to continue without a break right up until 1998, at no point dipping in the quality of the athletes competing.

=== Beauty and the Beast ===
1998 appeared to be its final year, but in 1999, the Beauty and the Beast competition, established in 1998, took on the title of World Strongman Challenge. In so doing, it immediately attracted the cream of international strength athletics once again. For five more years, the Beauty and the Beast produced world class champions but in a mirroring of the decline of the WMPC, the WSC also began to lose status. At around 2001 a Strongman Super Series had emerged, an attempt to heighten the profile of the sport. The IFSA World Strongman Super Series was being heavily promoted in 2002 and Beauty and the Beast formed part of that. In the end, it became simply the Grand Prix Final held on January 17, 2003, finishing off the 2002 season. The very next day, a second Hawaii Grand Prix, again deemed Beauty and the Beast, was held as the opener for the 2003 IFSA World Strongman Super Series. This turned out to be the last holding of the event. Like the World Muscle Power Classic, once the Beauty and the Beast became entangled with the Super Series, it lost its stand alone gravitas and quickly fell from favour. In the tentative schedule for the 2004/05 Super Series there was to have been a November Hawaii Grand Prix, but that season was foreshortened and this did not take place.

=== IFSA ===
In 2006, IFSA resurrected the World Strongman Challenge holding the event in Tulsa, Oklahoma Žydrūnas Savickas won the event, with Derek Poundstone coming in second and Jon Andersen coming in third. This was the final year that the World Strongman Challenge was held.

== Results ==
Year	Champion	Runner-up	3rd place	Location
Original
1987	(United Kingdom) / (England) Geoff Capes	(Netherlands) Ab Wolders	(Iceland) Jón Páll Sigmarsson	Japan
1988	(Finland) Riku Kiri	(Iceland) Jón Páll Sigmarsson	(United States) Bill Kazmaier	Finland
1989	(United Kingdom) / (England) Mark Higgins	(Iceland) Magnús Ver Magnússon	(United States) O.D. Wilson	Brazil
1990	(United Kingdom) / (England) Mark Higgins	(United States) Bill Kazmaier	(Iceland) Magnús Ver Magnússon	Canada
1991	(Finland) Riku Kiri	(United States) O.D. Wilson	(United Kingdom) / (Wales) Gary Taylor & (Iceland) Hjalti Árnason	China
1992	(United Kingdom) / (England) Jamie Reeves	(Iceland) Magnús Ver Magnússon	(United Kingdom) / (Wales) Gary Taylor	South Africa
1993	(South Africa) Gerrit Badenhorst	(Iceland) Magnús Ver Magnússon	(United Kingdom) / (England) Jamie Reeves	South Africa
1994	(Iceland) Andrés Guðmundsson	(Austria) Manfred Hoeberl	(United Kingdom) / (Wales) Gary Taylor	New Zealand
1995	(Finland) Jouko Ahola	(Denmark) Flemming Rasmussen	(Germany) Heinz Ollesch	Russia
1996	(Australia) Nathan Jones	(Iceland) Magnús Ver Magnússon	(Austria) Manfred Hoeberl	Australia
1997	(Iceland) Magnús Ver Magnússon	(Germany) Heinz Ollesch	(Norway) Svend Karlsen	Australia
1998	(Sweden) Magnus Samuelsson	(United States) Mark Phillipi	(United Kingdom) / (England) Jamie Reeves	Australia
Beauty and the Beast
1999	(Finland) Jouko Ahola	(Sweden) Magnus Samuelsson	(Samoa) Joe Onosai	(United States) Sea Life Park, Honolulu, Hawaii
2000	(Finland) Janne Virtanen	(Germany) Heinz Ollesch	(Norway) Svend Karlsen	(United States) Honolulu, Hawaii
2001	(Sweden) Magnus Samuelsson	(United States) Phil Pfister	(Norway) Svend Karlsen	(United States) Honolulu, Hawaii
2002; Hawaii Grand Prix Final (held Jan 17 2003) of 2002 Strongman Super Series (24-Hour Fitness Grand Prix Final)	(Canada) Hugo Girard	(Lithuania) Zydrunas Savickas	(Poland) Mariusz Pudzianowski	(United States) Hawaiian Waters Adventure Park, Honolulu, Hawaii
2003; Hawaii Grand Prix 2003 (held Jan 18 2003) of 2003 Strongman Super Series	(Poland) Mariusz Pudzianowski	(Latvia) Raimonds Bergmanis	(Lithuania) Zydrunas Savickas	(United States) Hawaiian Waters Adventure Park, Honolulu, Hawaii
IFSA
2006	(Lithuania) Žydrūnas Savickas	(United States) Derek Poundstone	(United States) Jon Andersen	(United States) Tulsa, Oklahoma

- Results for the IFSA and Original versions from David Horne's World of Grip.

== See also ==
- List of strongman competitions
