= Ari Gunnarsson =

Icelandic strongman

Personal information
- Nationality: Icelandic
- Born: 15 November 1983 (age 42)
- Occupation: Strongman
- Height: 6 ft 2 in (1.88 m)
- Weight: 140–160 kg (309–353 lb)
Medal record
Strongman
Representing Iceland
World's Strongest Man
Qualified	2016 World's Strongest Man
Qualified	2017 World's Strongest Man
Jón Páll Sigmarsson Classic
4th	2012 Jón Páll Sigmarsson Classic
Giants Live
9th	2015 Giants Live Viking Challenge
World Strongman Federation
7th	2015 WSF Proform Classic
Iceland's Strongest Man
2nd	2011 Iceland's Strongest Man
2nd	2012 Iceland's Strongest Man
3rd	2013 Iceland's Strongest Man
2nd	2015 Iceland's Strongest Man
3rd	2016 Iceland's Strongest Man
2nd	2017 Iceland's Strongest Man
3rd	2020 Iceland's Strongest Man
Strongest Man in Iceland
2nd	2011
2nd	2012
1st	2013
2nd	2016
1st	2018
1st	2019
Iceland's Strongest Viking
3rd	2010
3rd	2011
OK Budar Strongman Championships
3rd	2010

Ari Gunnarsson (born 15 November 1983) is an Icelandic strongman competitor from Reykjavík.

== Career ==
Ari was passionate about lifting heavy weights since his teenage years and was renowned for his static shoulder strength. He won 3rd place in the 2010 Iceland's Strongest Viking competition and the following year, repeated the same performance together with winning 2nd place at both Strongest Man in Iceland and the Iceland's Strongest Man, the most prestigious title of all Icelandic strength competitions. Ari is a 7 time podium finisher of the competition, emerging the 1st runner up 4 times and 2nd runner up 3 times behind Hafþór Júlíus Björnsson from 2011 to 2020. Ari won the Strongest Man in Iceland competition back to back in 2018 and 2019.

Ari also participated at the 2016 World's Strongest Man and 2017 World's Strongest Man competitions both held in Botswana, but couldn't advance into the finals since he secured only the 3rd place at group stages on both occasions.

== Personal records ==
- Deadlift - 340 kg (750 lb) x 5 reps
- Squat (Stiff bar) - 325 kg (717 lb) x 3 reps
- Bench Press (Raw) - 230 kg (507 lb)
- Log press - 180 kg (397 lb)
- Log press - 158 kg (348 lb) x 4 reps
- Viking press - 140 kg (309 lb) x 13 reps
- Circus Dumbbell press - 100 kg (220 lb) x 6 reps
- Load & Drag - 2 x 110 kg (243 lb) sacks each over a 10 meter course and a 310 kg (683 lb) cart for 8.61 meters
- Keg Toss - 5 kegs (22–30 kg) over 4.5 meters in 25.73 seconds
- Bus Pull - 15,000 kg (33,069 lb) for 25 meters in 45.68 seconds
