= Le Defi Mark Ten International =

Tournament information
- Location: Canada
- Established: 1984
- Final year: 1992
- Format: Multi-event competition

Final champion
- (Lithuania) Raimondas Zenkevičius (1994)

Le Defi Mark Ten International was one of the most prestigious strongman contest in the world in the 1980s and early 1990s. Staged in Quebec, Canada, it was begun as a tribute to Louis Cyr and was notable for the quality of the strength athletes it attracted, which included a number of winners of the World's Strongest Man competition, including Jón Páll Sigmarsson, Bill Kazmaier and Magnús Ver Magnússon.

== History ==
Live strength athletics competitions had begun in the late 1970s as a distinct set of disciplines from other strength related sports such as powerlifting or Highland Games. However, the associations of the new phenomena with its sporting forebears resulted in certain countries being at the vanguard of such competitions. One such country with a deep rooted past in strongman competition was Canada, and in particular Quebec, referred to as a "cradle of strongmen". In 1984 Jean-Claude Arsenault began to promote a competition named after the most famous of Quebec's strongmen of the past, Louis Cyr. The Louis Cyr Tournament was quickly a success and gained the sponsorship of a cigarette company resulting in its change of name to Defi Mark Ten.

The first outing of the competition caused some newspapers to claim that "Nationalism marred contest" citing the fact that Quebec was painted on the backdrop to the competition deliberately separate from Canada and grouped with France. Despite this, there was noted by the same newspaper an impressive camaraderie amongst the athletes.

The event attracted the very top strength athletes in the world. Amongst these names were Bill Kazmaier, Magnus Ver Magnusson and Jon Pall Sigmarsson. The Canadian Tom Magee was the winner of the first three tournaments and the giant Mark Higgins has been cited as the final winner before the sponsorship ran out in 1992. A final contest was reportedly held two years later, with Raimundas Zenkevicius claiming that title although sources differ. In 2008 a competition called Fortissimus, founded by Paul Ohl, was staged in Canada which also claimed to be a tribute to the great Louis Cyr and was thus seen as the natural successor to the Defi Mark Ten International.

== Results ==
Year	Champion	Runner-up	3rd place	Location
1984	(Canada) Tom Magee	(United States) John Gamble	(Canada) Robert Dubeau	(Canada) Quebec City
1985	(Canada) Tom Magee	(Canada) Claude Labonté	(Iceland) Jón Páll Sigmarsson	(Canada) Quebec City
1986	(Canada) Tom Magee	(Iceland) Jón Páll Sigmarsson	(United Kingdom) Mark Higgins	(Canada) Quebec City
1987	(United States) Bill Kazmaier	(United Kingdom) Mark Higgins	(Canada) Robert Dubeau	(Canada) Montreal
1988	(Iceland) Hjalti Árnason	(Iceland) Magnús Ver Magnússon	(Canada) Tom Magee	(Canada) Montreal
1989	(Iceland) Magnús Ver Magnússon	(To be confirmed)	(To be confirmed)	(Canada) Montreal
1990	(United Kingdom) Mark Higgins	(United States) Bill Kazmaier	(Iceland) Magnús Ver Magnússon	(Canada) Montreal
1991	(United Kingdom) Mark Higgins	(To be confirmed)	(To be confirmed)	(Canada) Montreal
1992	(United Kingdom) Mark Higgins	(To be confirmed)	(To be confirmed)	(Canada) Montreal
1993	Event not held			
1994	(Lithuania) Raimondas Zenkevičius	(Iceland) Hjalti Árnason	(Lithuania) Stasys Mėčius	(Canada) Quebec City

- Results from David Horne's World of Grip and www.strengthresults.com

== See also ==
- List of strongman competitions
