= Stefán Sölvi Pétursson =

Icelandic strongman competitor (born 1986)

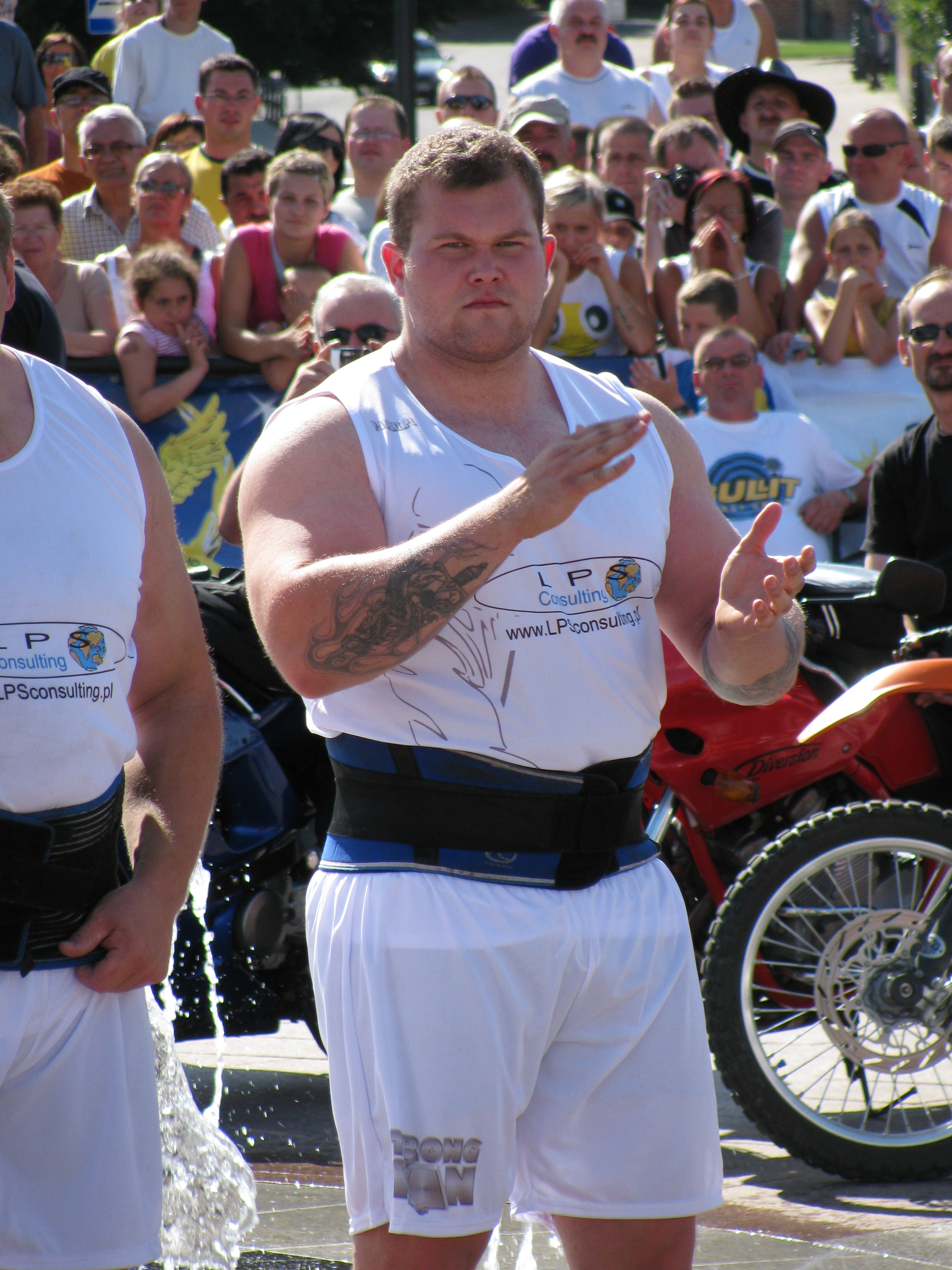

Personal information
- Born: 20 March 1986 (age 40) Iceland
- Occupations: Strongman, Highland games
- Height: 196 cm (6 ft 5 in)
- Weight: 150–164 kg (331–362 lb)
Medal record
Strongman
Representing Iceland
World's Strongest Man
Qualified	2008 World's Strongest Man
Qualified	2009 World's Strongest Man
4th	2010 World's Strongest Man
9th	2011 World's Strongest Man
Qualified	2017 World's Strongest Man
Giants Live
4th	2009 Viking Power Challenge
3rd	2009 Giants Live Poland
4th	2010 Giants Live South Africa
8th	2010 Giants Live Poland
3rd	2010 Giants Live Turkey
4th	2011 Giants Live London
Strongman Champions League
5th	2008 SCL Serbia
7th	2016 SCL Norway
4th	2016 SCL Serbia
5th	2017 SCL Canada
7th	2018 SCL Norway
5th	2018 SCL FIBO
6th	2018 SCL Curaçao
5th	2020 SCL Norway
Fortissimus
8th	2008 Fortissimus
WSM Experience, London
4th	2010 WSM Experience I
5th	2010 WSM Experience II
World Strongman Federation
4th	2012 WSF World Championship
King of the Castle
2nd	2012 King of the Castle
All-American Strongman Challenge
2nd	2012 All-American Challenge
Jon Pall Sigmarsson Classic
9th	2010 Jon Pall Sigmarsson Classic
Iceland's Strongest Man
2nd	2008
1st	2009
1st	2010
2nd	2016
Iceland's Strongest Man (IFSA)
2nd	2006
1st	2008
Iceland's Strongest Viking
1st	2006
1st	2009
2nd	2011
2nd	2012
Strongest Man in Iceland
3rd	2016
Westfjord's Viking
1st	2008
1st	2009
Lithuania's Strongest Man
5th	2010
Highland Games
Representing Iceland
Highlander World Championships
Qualified	2008 Highlander World Championships

Stefán Sölvi Pétursson (born 20 March 1986) is an Icelandic strongman and a finalist of the World's Strongest Man competition, winning 4th place in the 2010 World's Strongest Man competition held in Sun City, South Africa and 9th place in the 2011 World's Strongest Man competition held in Wingate, North Carolina. He has also won Icelandic Strongman competitions multiple times including Iceland’s Strongest Man in 2009 and 2010.

== Career ==
=== Powerlifting ===
Stefán was inspired towards strength and physical culture at the age of 4 when he saw Jón Páll Sigmarsson during an exhibition. As a teenager he started lifting weights and started powerlifting in 2004 at the age of 18 where he totaled 760 kg (1,676 lb) in single ply equipment. In 2005 at the age of 19, he totaled 855 kg (1,885 lb).

=== Strongman ===
In 2006 he switched to strongman and in the same year won Iceland's Strongest Viking competition at the age of 20. His first international strongman competition was the 2006 IFSA World Championships. In 2007 he tore his left bicep tendon and took the year off for recovery.

==== 2008 to 2009 ====
In 2008 Stefán won Iceland's Strongest Man IFSA version and came second to Kristinn Óskar Haraldsson in the Iceland's Strongest Man. While returning to international circuit, he secured fifth place in the 2008 Strongman Champions League Serbia, eighth place in 2008 Fortissimus and also participated in the prestigious Highland Games World Championships of 2008. In the same year, at 22 years and 178 days old, he also became the 7th youngest athlete in history to qualify for the World's Strongest Man competition.

In 2009 Stefán won both Iceland's Strongest Viking and Iceland's Strongest Man, becoming only the third Icelander to win both titles and the eighth Icelander to win the main national title, the Iceland's Strongest Man. At the International circuit, he won third place in 2009 Giants Live Poland, fourth place in 2009 Viking Power Challenge and qualified for the 2009 World's Strongest Man.

==== 2010 to 2011 ====
In 2010, Stefán started competing prolifically competing in competitions such as Strongman Super Series, Viking Power Challenge, Jón Páll Sigmarsson Classic and won 3rd place in 2010 Giants Live Turkey behind Žydrūnas Savickas and Brian Shaw. He won his 2nd consecutive Iceland's Strongest Man, emerged fourth in 2010 Giants Live South Africa and also participated in 2010 London Scottish Highland Games. In 2010 he achieved his highest placing in the World's Strongest Man securing fourth place in the finals behind Savickas, Shaw and Mikhail Koklyaev.

In 2011, he emerged fourth in the Giants Live London competition but in April, tore his pectoral muscle. He return soon after for Globe's Strongest Man competition and participated at the 2011 World's Strongest Man competition alongwith his good friend and future champion Hafþór Júlíus Björnsson where he emerged ninth in the finals. It was also the first and only time in history where there were two Icelanders in the finals.

==== 2012 to 2020 ====
In 2012 he won 2nd place behind Hafþór in 2012 King of the Castle competition in Finland and again won 2nd place in 2012 All-American Strongman Challenge. But later in 2012, tragedy struck as Stefán got injured during 2012 Nordic Strongman Championships and was also diagnosed with Supraventricular tachycardia which took him about 3 years to recover.

Upon returning to Strongman, Stefán sustained a major injury during the frame carry event at 2016 Europe's Strongest Man and had to withdraw from competing again until full recovery. Despite never getting fully recovered from the injury, he returned to competitive strongman in 10 months and continued with World's Strongest Man, Strongman Champions League and International Strongman Federation, but a second biceps tear, which occurred during 2020 Iceland’s Strongest Man competition, forced him to retire from competitive strongman.

=== In media ===
In 2018, Stefán co-produced and starred in the documentary film 'Fullsterkur' (literally translates as 'full strength' in English) which explores the history and culture of heavy stone lifting in Iceland. Stefán's favourite strongman event is also Natural stone loading.

== Personal records ==
=== Strongman ===
- Deadlift – 390 kg (860 lb) (2011 Giants Live London)
- Deadlift for reps (12" from the floor) – 300 kg (661 lb) x 8 reps (2006 Iceland's Strongest Man (IFSA))
- Axle press – 195 kg (430 lb) (2010 Giants Live Turkey)
- Axle press for reps – 170 kg (375 lb) x 3 near strict presses (during training)
- Log press – 170 kg (375 lb) (2010 World's Strongest Man - Finals)
- Max Atlas stone – 211 kg (465 lb) as a part of a 5 stone run (2016 Iceland's Strongest Man), and 210 kg (463 lb) x 4 reps, over a 4 ft bar (2008 SCL Serbia)
- Atlas stones – 5 stones 110–180 kg (243–397 lb) in 16.65 seconds (2010 King of the Castle)
- Atlas stones – 5 stones 120–180 kg (265–397 lb) in 18.35 seconds (2010 Giants Live Turkey)
- Atlas stones – 5 stones 130–180 kg (287–397 lb) in 20.21 seconds (2010 Giants Live South Africa)
- Atlas stone one motion – 155 kg (342 lb) to a 5 ft 4 in platform (during training)
- Natural stone lift to platform – 6 rocks from 105–184 kg (231–406 lb) in 32.24 seconds (2008 Iceland's Strongest Man (IFSA)) (World Record)
- Farmer's walk (no straps) – 200 kg (441 lb) per each hand for 20.67 metres (67 ft 10 in) (2016 Guinness World Records, China) (World Record)
- Frame carry (no straps) – 375 kg (827 lb) for 30m course in 23.25 seconds (2011 World's Strongest Man)
- Medley – 130kg each hand farmer's walk & 2 x 120-150kg sacks in a 30m course - 40.01 seconds (2012 King of the Castle) (World Record)
- Keg toss (for max) – 15 kg (33 lb) over 5.80 metres (19 ft 0 in) (2006 Icelandic Highland Games) and 20 kg (44 lb) over 5.40 metres (17 ft 9 in) (2006 Iceland's Strongest Viking)
- Keg toss run – 8 kegs 17–24 kg (37–53 lb) over 5.0 metres in 23.53 seconds (2009 World's Strongest Man - Group 2)
- Truck pull – 20,000 kg (44,092 lb) for 25m in 50.07 seconds (2009 World's Strongest Man - Group 2)

=== Powerlifting ===
During competition, performed at the age of 19:

- Squat (Single-ply) – 305 kg (672 lb) (2005 KRAFT Íslandsmeistaramót í kraftlyftingum)
- Bench press (Single-ply) – 225 kg (496 lb) (2005 KRAFT Íslandsmeistaramót í kraftlyftingum)
- Deadlift (Single-ply) – 370 kg (816 lb) (2005 KRAFT Íslandsmeistaramót í réttstöðulyftu)
- Total (Single-ply) – 855 kg (1,885 lb) (305 + 225 + 325 kg (672 + 496 + 717 lb)) (2005 KRAFT Íslandsmeistaramót í kraftlyftingum)

During training:

- Squat (Raw) – 330 kg (728 lb)
- Bench press (Raw) – 230 kg (507 lb)
