= Hjalti Árnason =

Icelandic strongman competitor and world champion powerlifter (born 1963)

Personal information
- Nickname: The Great Ursus
- Nationality: Icelandic
- Born: 18 February 1963 (age 63) Reykjavík
- Occupation(s): Strongman and Powerlifter
- Height: 6 ft 1 in (1.85 m)
- Weight: 125–145 kg (276–320 lb)
Medal record
Strongman
Representing Iceland
World's Strongest Man
Qualified	1996 World's Strongest Man
World Muscle Power Championships
4th	1987 World Muscle Power Championships
3rd	1990 World Muscle Power Championships
Le Defi Mark Ten International
5th	1986 Le Defi Mark Ten International
4th	1987 Le Defi Mark Ten International
1st	1988 Le Defi Mark Ten International
2nd	1994 Le Defi Mark Ten International
World Strongman Challenge
3rd	1991 World Strongman Challenge
Europe's Strongest Man
5th	1991 Europe's Strongest Man
Viking Games
3rd	1987 Viking Games
Pure Strength
1st	1989 w/Magnús Ver Magnússon
2nd	1990 w/Magnús Ver Magnússon
Iceland's Strongest Man
2nd	1985 Iceland's Strongest Man
2nd	1986 Iceland's Strongest Man
2nd	1987 Iceland's Strongest Man
3rd	1988 Iceland's Strongest Man
2nd	1989 Iceland's Strongest Man
3rd	1990 Iceland's Strongest Man
2nd	1991 Iceland's Strongest Man
3rd	1993 Iceland's Strongest Man
2nd	1996 Iceland's Strongest Man
Icelandic Power Trial Championships
1st	1995

Hjalti Árnason
Medal record
Representing Iceland
Powerlifting
EPF European Powerlifting Championships
3rd	1985 EPF Europe's	+125kg
3rd	1990 EPF Europe's	+125kg
3rd	1991 EPF Europe's	+125kg
NPF Nordic Powerlifting Championships
3rd	1983 NPF Nordic's	125kg
IPF Junior World Championships
4th	1985 IPF Junior's	+125kg

Hjalti 'Úrsus' Árnason (born 18 February 1963), is an Icelandic former strongman, powerlifter and a strength sports promoter.

Known by the nickname 'The Great Ursus', Hjalti coached and trained together with Jón Páll Sigmarsson. He won the highly acclaimed Le Defi Mark Ten International in 1988 and podiumed at World Muscle Power Championships in 1990. Hjalti also competed with Magnús Ver Magnússon in Pure Strength team competitions in 1989 & 1990, and won gold and silver.

== Early life ==
Hjalti was born in Reykjavík in 1963. He grew up in the same neighbourhood as Jón Páll Sigmarsson and they attended the same school. His sports career began with training in karate and he also participated in soccer, handball, and track and field.

== Career ==
=== 1983–1985 ===
Hjalti had a talent for powerlifting and shot to fame when he began competing internationally from 1983. In that year, he came first in the Junior European Championships and made the senior national team, and won third place at 1983 NPF Nordic championships. Hjalti won third at 1985 EPF Europe's however he noticed how powerlifting had little money or publicity associated with it and began began to compete in Strongman to make a living as a semi-professional. Along-with his good friend, Jón Páll, he began to make waves in the higher-profile world of the World's Strongest Man competition and its associated circuit.

In 1985, Hjalti competed in the very first Iceland's Strongest Man contest and was second to Jón Páll whilst Magnús Ver Magnússon came third. He would repeat podium finishes in this contest a total of 9 times whilst in the company of two men who between them won the World's Strongest Man title eight times.

=== 1986 ===
Hjalti's forays into strongman consisted of a mixture of Strength athletics including Highland Games. It was noted that he primarily relied on his 'brute strength' and sacrificed technique and suffered from a lack of proper, regular coaching. In one contest, his 'animalistic approach' was demonstrated when he broke his opponent's arm in an arm wrestling bout. In 1986 Le Defi Mark Ten International competition Hjalti emerged fifth.

=== 1987 ===
In 1987 Le Defi Mark Ten International, Hjalti broke the world record in the platform lift. Upon being asked to do 'something spectacular for the TV cameras' by a sponsor, Hjalti was reported to have picked the sponsor up by an arm and a leg and hurled him some distance to the astonishment of bystanders. He also secured third place at 1987 Viking Games.

=== 1988 ===
In 1988, Hjalti became the first European to win the prestigious Le Defi Mark Ten International in Canada, by defeating the likes of Magnús Ver and Tom Magee. He also secured third place in 1988 Kraftur championships and his fourth consecutive podium finish at the Iceland's Strongest Man.

On the world stage, Hjalti was also a top performer in Highland Games. His wrestling match with Bill Kazmaier at Earlshall has been described as one of the best ever.

=== 1989 ===
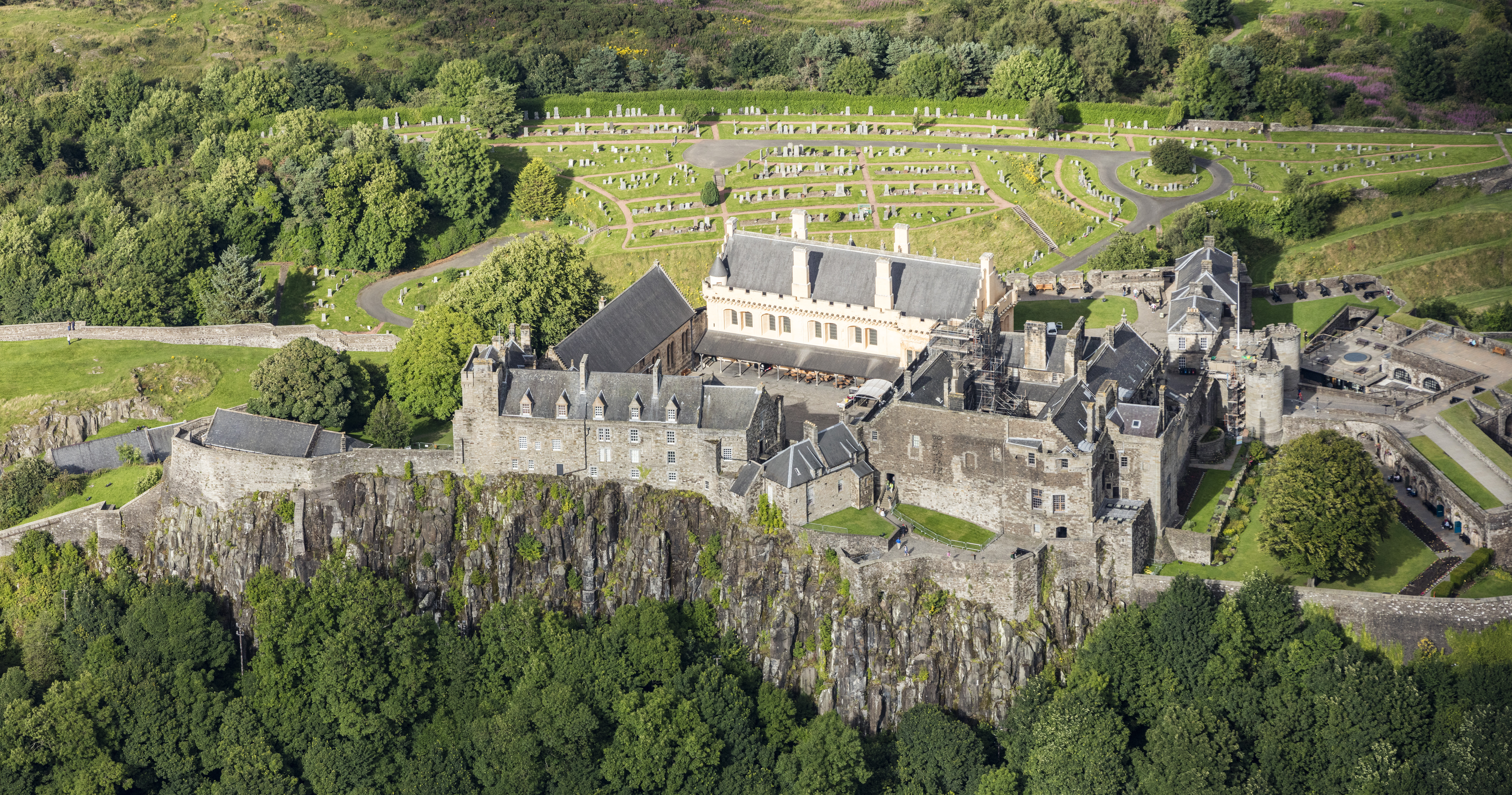
Stirling Castle, venue of 1989 Pure Strength championships.

At 1989 Pure Strength team championships, Hjalti and Magnús Ver Magnússon defeated United States, Great Britain and Netherlands to become champions. The competition featured 16 events which spanned over 4 days which featured several unique events including the sward and chalice hold, scrum push, lumberjack's log chop, and sack, hay and barrel loading race. At Kraftur championships he placed fourth.

At 1989 Icelandic Powerlifting Championships, Hjalti became the first Icelander to total 1,000 kg (2,205 lb) in powerlifting.

=== 1990 ===
At 1990 EPF Europe's powerlifting championships, Hjalti won the bronze medal in the +125 kg weight class. Him and Magnús Ver won second place at the 1990 Pure Strength team championships and he won third place at 1990 World Muscle Power Classic. He also secured his sixth consecutive Iceland's Strongest Man podium finish.

=== 1991 ===
After placing third at 1991 World Strongman Challenge, Hjalti won bronze again in 1991 EPF Europe's powerlifting championships in the +125 kg weight class. During 1991 IPF World Powerlifting championships held in Örebro, Sweden, Hjalti squatted 385 kg (849 lb). He placed fifth at 1991 Europe's Strongest Man, fourth at 1991 World Viking Challenge and secured his seventh consecutive Iceland's Strongest Man podium finish.

=== 1992–1995 ===
Hjalti placed eighth at 1992 Kraftur championships and volunteered to take part as an event tester, alongside his friend Mark Higgins.

In 1993 World Viking Challenge, Hjalti placed fifth to Magnús Ver, Andrés Guðmundsson, Riku Kiri and Manfred Hoeberl.

Hjalti placed second at 1994 Le Defi Mark Ten International and won 1995 Icelandic Power Trial Championships.

=== 1996 ===
In his only appearance at the World's Strongest Man competition in 1996, Hjalti gave a good battle but couldn't qualify for the finals. Prior to 1994 in his prime, WSM had a limited field with no heats. As such countries were rarely granted multiple competitor places. For Hjalti, this left him in the shadow of Jón Páll and Magnús Ver, where David Webster described it as a pity saying "Hjalti was undoubtedly one of the world's strongest men".

With another second place finish, Hjalti secured his ninth podium finish at the Iceland's Strongest Man.

== Personal records ==
Powerlifting (performed in single-ply equipment)

- Squat – 385 kg (849 lb) (1991 IPF World Powerlifting Championships)
- Bench press – 245 kg (540 lb) (1989 Íslandsmeistaramót í kraftlyftingum)
- Deadlift – 375 kg (827 lb) (1989 Íslandsmeistaramót í kraftlyftingum)
- Total – 1,000 kg (2,205 lb) (380 + 245 + 375 kg (838 + 540 + 827 lb)) (1989 Íslandsmeistaramót í kraftlyftingum)

Strongman

- Smith platform lift – 862 kg (1,900 lb) (1987 Le Defi Mark Ten International) (World Record)
- Machine Squat – 455 kg (1,003 lb) (1991 World Strongman Challenge)
- Car walk – 400 kg (882 lb) for 30 metres in 28.7 seconds (1993 World Viking Challenge)
- Log press – 150 kg (331 lb) (1993 World Viking Challenge)
- Húsafell Stone carry – 186 kg (410 lb) for 29.01 metres (95 ft 2 in) (1993 World Viking Challenge)

→ Hjalti has carried the Húsafell Stone 52 metres (170 ft 7 in) during training in late 80s

- Natural stone loading to 4 ft platform – 150 kg (331 lb) (1991 World Viking Challenge)
- Braemar Stone throw – 12.5 kg (28 lb) for 8.05 metres (26 ft 5 in) (1988 Le Defi Mark Ten International)
- Weight over bar – 25.5 kg (56 lb) over 4.70 metres (15 ft 5 in) (1991 World Viking Challenge)
- Caber toss – 45 kg (99 lb) for 10.08 metres (33 ft 1 in) (1987 Viking Power Challenge)
- Sheaf toss – 7.3 kg (16 lb) light sheaf over 5.48 metres (18 ft 0 in) (1987 World Muscle Power Classic)
- Scottish hammer throw – 15 kg (33 lb) super-heavy hammer for 27.02 metres (88 ft 8 in) (1991 World Viking Challenge)

== Personal life and career after sport ==
From his marriage to Ethel Karlsdóttir, Hjalti has two sons, Greipur (born 1989) and Árni (born 1992). After divorcing, he moved in with his girlfriend, Halla Heimisdóttir. His brother is a noted musician in Iceland.

Outside of sports, his careers were multiple and varied. He was a bouncer, a caring supervisor in a psychiatric hospital, a security agent, a debt collector, and a system administrator for Post and Telecom in Iceland.

Hjalti also remained close to sport and became a major promoter of strongman and other strength athletics in Iceland. He created and organized the Jón Páll Sigmarsson Classic from 2010 to 2012 and to this date organizes and hosts the countries main Strongman title Iceland's Strongest Man.
