= Benedikt Magnússon =

Icelandic strongman and powerlifter (born 1983)

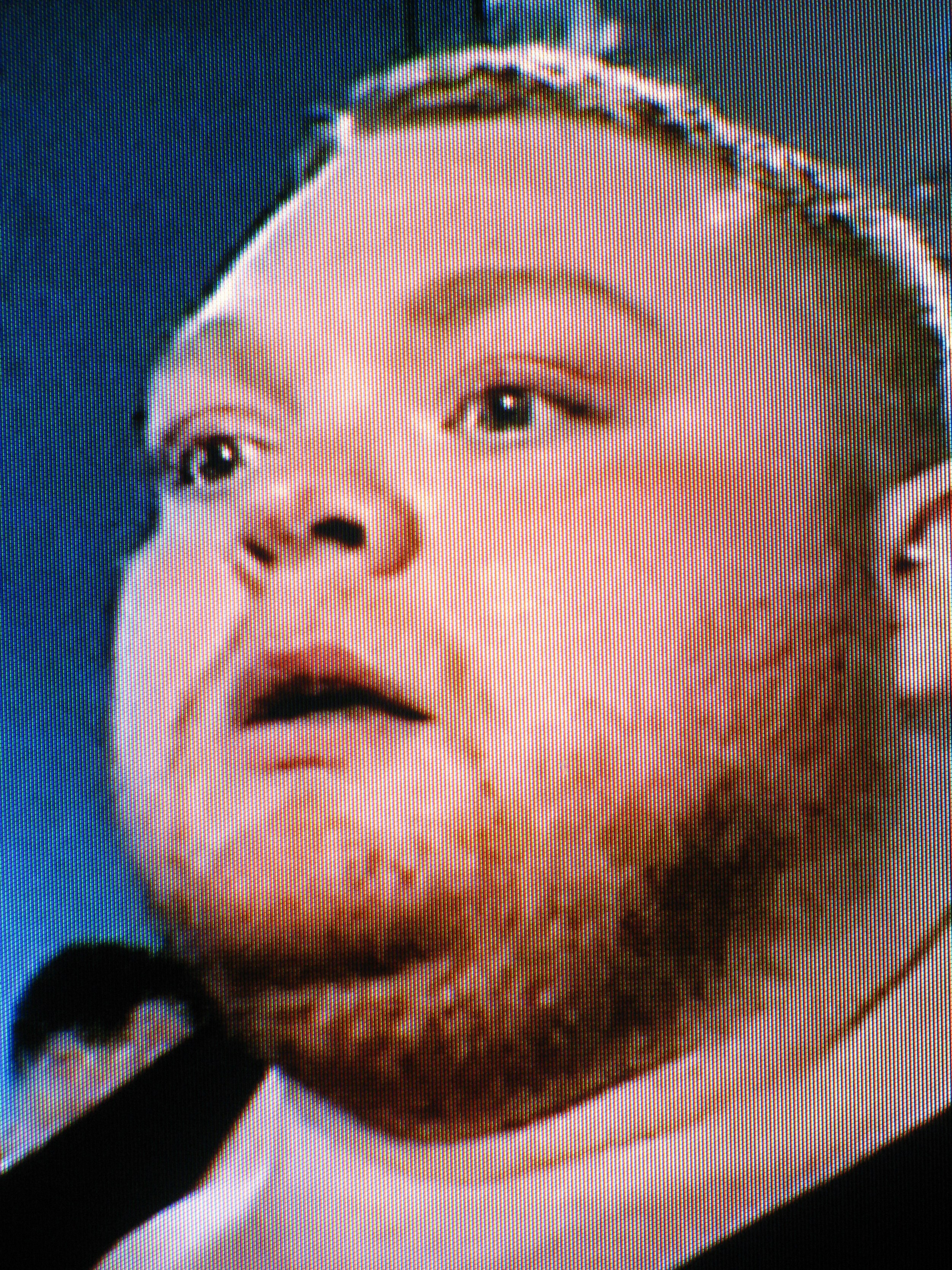
- Benedikt in 2008

Personal information
- Nickname: Benni
- Nationality: Icelandic
- Born: 4 June 1983 (age 43) Reykjavík, Iceland
- Occupation(s): Strongman, powerlifter
- Height: 183 cm (6 ft 0 in)
- Weight: 150–172.5 kg (331–380 lb)
- Children: 3
- Relative: Magnús Magnússon (brother)
Medal record
Strongman
Representing Iceland
World's Strongest Man
Qualified	2015 World's Strongest Man
Arnold Strongman Classic
5th	2006 Arnold Strongman Classic
5th	2008 Arnold Strongman Classic
9th	2015 Arnold Strongman Classic
IFSA Strongman World Championship
7th	2006 World Championships
4th	2006 Ukraine Grand Prix
10th	2007 Lithuania Grand Prix
Giants Live
6th	2014 FitX Melbourne
7th	2016 Scandinavian Open
Iceland's Strongest Man
1st	2003
2nd	2004
2nd	2010
Iceland's Strongest Man (IFSA)
1st	2005
1st	2006
1st	2007
Iceland's Strongest Viking
1st	2007

Benedikt "Benni" Magnússon (/ˈbɛni ˈmæɡnəsən/ BEN-ee MAG-nə-sən, Icelandic: [ˈpɛːnɛtɪxt ˈpɛnːɪ ˈmaknusˌsɔːn]; born 4 June 1983) is an Icelandic strongman and powerlifter. He held the raw deadlift world record from 2011 to 2022 with 460.4 kg (1,015 lb), and it remains the heaviest raw deadlift ever done in conventional stance. He is widely regarded as one of the greatest deadlifters of all-time.

Benedikt also held the record for the heaviest raw conventional deadlift ever performed within a full meet at 442.5 kg (976 lb) for 15 years. He also set the world record for the heaviest strongman deadlift in 2014 with 461 kg (1,016 lb) and briefly shared it with 465 kg (1,025 lb) in 2016.

== Powerlifting career ==
Benedikt started his powerlifting journey at the age of 16, in 1999, deadlifting 200 kg (441 lb) in single ply equipment during Íslandsmeistaramót national championships. By 2001, he progressed to a 720 kg (1,587 lb) total in singly ply equipment. In 2004, at the age of 21, he totaled 1,000.5 kg (2,206 lb) and the following year took it to 1,090 kg (2,403 lb) with a 405 kg (893 lb) squat, 275 kg (606 lb) bench press and a 410 kg (904 lb) deadlift, in singly ply equipment.

Benedikt's breakthrough performance came in 2005, when he switched from equipped to raw division in powerlifting. At 2005 WPO European Semi Finals, in Helsinki, Benedikt broke Andy Bolton's all-time deadlift world record by pulling 426 kg (939 lb) raw as his opener. Andy who was also competing at the same competition, responded with a 427.5 kg (942 lb) equipped pull to re-claim the record. But it did not last very long as Benedikt shattered it in his second lift with a massive 440 kg (970 lb) raw pull, increasing the record to a never approached territory.

The record stood only four months until Bolton pulled 440.5 kg (971 lb) equipped during 2006 Arnold Classic. Benedikt suffered an injury and for the next three years was out of the limelight, where Bolton took the record to 455 kg (1,003 lb) and 457.5 kg (1,009 lb) by 2009. In his return after the injury, Benedikt pulled 442.5 kg (976 lb) raw at 2010 FPO Bullfarm Championships in Helsinki but was surpassed by Bolton who pulled 445 kg (981 lb) equipped in the same meet.

At 2011 Ronnie Coleman classic - Clash of the Titans IV, Benedikt reclaimed the all-time world record with 460.4 kg (1,015 lb) which remained the heaviest raw or equipped deadlift for 11 years until 2022, and to this day remains the heaviest raw deadlift ever done in conventional stance.

== Strongman career ==
Benedikt's strongman career started in 2003 where he won both Iceland's Strongest Man and Iceland's Strongest Man IFSA version. The following year he won the IFSA version but lost the main title to the veteran Magnús Ver Magnússon. In 2006 he was invited to the Arnold Strongman Classic where he placed fifth. Benedikt won the timber carry event and placed second to Brian Siders at the 15 inch elevated Hummer tyre deadlift, where hummer tires were used instead of standard powerlifting plates, and lifting straps were allowed.

In 2007, he won Iceland's Strongest Viking and returning to the Arnold Strongman Classic in 2008, again emerged fifth, sharing the hummer tyre deadlift world record with Oleksandr Pekanov with a pull of 471 kg (1,038 lb) before pulling 500 kg (1,102 lb) on the record breakers attempt following the competition. In 2010 Iceland's Strongest Man he emerged runner-up to Stefán Sölvi Pétursson. Benedikt's next competition was the 2014 Giants Live FitX Melbourne where he broke Brian Shaw's strongman deadlift record with 445 kg (981 lb). A few months later at World Deadlift Championships, Benedikt broke the strongman deadlift record again with 446 kg (983 lb) and then in his last attempt, pulled 461 kg (1,016 lb), surpassing his own powerlifting world record of 460.4 kg (1,015 lb), making the new 461 kg (1,016 lb) performed in strongman standards, the 'all-time world record' deadlift.

In 2015, Benedikt qualified to the World's Strongest Man but couldn't enter the finals and was eliminated at the group stage. At 2015 World Log Lift Championships Benedikt pressed a 180 kg (397 lb) log, surpassing Ari Gunnarsson as the Icelandic national log press record holder. He held the record for one year until Hafþór Júlíus Björnsson pressed 200 kg (441 lb) at 2016 Arnold South America.

At 2016 Europe's Strongest Man, Benedikt deadlifted 465 kg (1,025 lb) to equal the, now all-time deadlift world record (irrespective of strongman or powerlifting) with Jerry Pritchett and Eddie Hall. Hall then went on to be the first person to deadlift 500 kg (1,102 lb), which Benedikt also attempted, but was unsuccessful. Benedikt's last competition was 2016 Giants Live Scandinavian Open in Sweden.

== Personal records ==
Powerlifting:
Raw:

- Squat (w/wraps) – 380 kg (838 lb) (2010 FPO Bullfarm Powerlifting Championships)
- Bench press – 220 kg (485 lb) (2010 FPO Bullfarm Powerlifting Championships)
- Deadlift – 460.4 kg (1,015 lb) (2011 Hardcore Clash of the Titans IV) (World Record)
- Total – 1,042.5 kg (2,298 lb) (380 + 220 + 442.5 kg (838 + 485 + 976 lb)) (2010 FPO Bullfarm Powerlifting Championships)

Equipped (single ply):

- Squat – 405 kg (893 lb) (2005 KRAFT Íslandsmeistaramót í kraftlyftingum)
- Bench press – 275 kg (606 lb) (2005 KRAFT Íslandsmeistaramót í kraftlyftingum)
- Total – 1,090 kg (2,403 lb) (405 + 220 + 410 kg (893 + 485 + 904 lb)) (2005 KRAFT Íslandsmeistaramót í kraftlyftingum)

Strongman:

- Deadlift – 465 kg (1,025 lb) (2016 World Deadlift Championships) (Former World Record)
- Deadlift for reps – 400 kg (882 lb) for 5 reps (2010 Steve Gym comp) (Former World Record)
- Hummer tire Deadlift (15 in from the floor) – 500 kg (1,102 lb) (2008 Arnold Strongman Classic, record breakers) (Former World Record)
- Log press – 180 kg (397 lb) (2015 World Log Lift Championships)

→ Benedikt has also pressed 190 kg (419 lb) and 200 kg (441 lb) in training

- Apollon's Axle press – 166 kg (366 lb) for 3 reps (2006 IFSA Ukraine Grand Prix)
- Timber carry (raw grip) – 392 kg (864 lb) for 40 ft in 11.47 seconds (2006 Arnold Strongman Classic)
- Keg toss – 20 kg (44 lb) over 5.10 metres (16 ft 9 in) (2004 Westfjord's Viking)

== Personal life ==
Benedikt is the brother of fellow Iceland's Strongest Man winner Magnús Magnússon.

Benedikt and his Britain's Strongest Woman winner ex wife Gemma Taylor co-owned the Super Gym in Iceland, which ran monthly 'raw' competitions including Deadlift, Squat, Bench press, Log press and Rolling Thunder.

Benedikt lays out his training routine leading up to his 460.4 kg (1,015 lb) deadlift in two simple steps, starting with the pre-conditioning phase and ending with the muscle-building phase. Between the two phases, he would spend 4–6 days in the gym per week. He was sponsored by online sports nutrition brand Myprotein.

== See also ==
- List of strongmen
