= Mark Higgins (strength athlete) =

British strongman

- Born: Mark Higgins; 16 May 1963 (age 63); London, England
- Occupation: Strongman
- Height: 6 ft 9 in (2.06 m)

Competition record

Strongman

Representing United Kingdom

World Muscle Power Championships
2nd	1986
2nd	1990

World Strongman Challenge
1st	1989
1st	1990

World's Strongest Team
1st	1987
2nd	1988
3rd	1989

Le Defi Mark Ten International
1st	1992
1st	1991
1st	1990
2nd	1987
3rd	1986

European Muscle Power Championship
1st	1987

Representing England

Britain's Strongest Man
2nd	1988

British Muscle Power Championship
1st	1988
1st	1990
1st	1991
1st	1992

Mark Higgins (born 16 May 1963) is a former strongman competitor, having won the World Strongman Challenge on two occasions, and was the British Muscle Power Champion on four occasions. Previously, he was an international discus thrower and had been a sailor and basketball player at a high level.

== Sporting career ==
Higgins was renowned as a great all-rounder.He threw the discus internationally for Great Britain. His best performance was 50.80m in a meet in Solihull on 13 Aug 1990, although this placed him well down the all-time British list. In addition to this, he was an international basketball player, powerlifter and was also selected to travel with the British sailing team to Australia for the America's Cup.

Standing at 6’9", and weighing 364 pounds, Mark Higgins was the biggest international strongman produced by Britain. His competitive era ran concurrently with that of Jamie Reeves. Thus, despite attaining a career high of winning back-to-back World Strongman Challenge titles in 1989 and 1990, he was still considered Britain's number two man, Jamie Reeves being the winner of the World's Strongest Man. Together, they were the runners-up in the World's Strongest Team competition of 1988, which he had previously won with Geoff Capes in 1987.

In addition, he achieved podium finishes at the World Muscle Power Championships and won the Le Defi Mark Ten International on multiple occasions.
