= World Muscle Power Classic =

Annual strongman competition

- The official logo of World Muscle Power 2003

Tournament information
- Location: Scotland from 1985-2002; Quebec 2003-2004
- Established: 1985
- Final year: 2004
- Format: Multi-event competition

Final champion
- (Canada) Hugo Girard

The World Muscle Power Classic (WMPC) (sometimes known as the World Muscle Power Championships) was one of the most enduring annual strongman competitions, running for twenty years and in that time attaining the position of the second most prestigious strongman contest in the world, after the World's Strongest Man.

It was notable for that reason and for the quality of the strength athletes it attracted, which included every winner of the World's Strongest Man competition from 1980 onwards including Jón Páll Sigmarsson, Geoff Capes and Bill Kazmaier from the 1980s right up to the five time WSM champion Mariusz Pudzianowski and four time WSM champion Žydrūnas Savickas, both of whom were never able to capture the WMPC title.

== History ==
The World Muscle Power Classic (WMPC) first took place in 1985, with the by then established World's Strongest Man having made the popularity of strongman competitions such that this second world title was viable. In a sport notorious for the difficulty with which organisers are faced in making an event enduring, the WMPC stood side by side with the World's Strongest Man for almost twenty years and in that time saw many other events come and go.

From the outset it attracted the very best athletes in the field and the final placings in that inaugural 1985 competition saw Jón Páll Sigmarsson, Geoff Capes and Bill Kazmaier on the podium, all previous winners of the World's Strongest Man and who between them won that title nine times. The event was organized and produced by Douglas Edmunds and later the Reeves brothers. For its inception until 2002, the event was held in Scotland, home of the Highland Games, which has a claim to be the progenitor of Strength athletics. The quality of the entrants continued unabated, attracting the very best in the world, and the competition quickly became regarded as the second most prestigious title after World's Strongest Man.

The events twentieth century years saw it have a distinctly Highland Games touch. In 1998 for example, there was an opening ceremony started with a parade and several bag pipe bands played as the "World Highland Games Competitors" and the "World Muscle Power Classic Competitors" entered the field together. The competitors lined up in front of the Chieftains table and Jouko Ahola, then World Strongest Man was given the title of honorary chieftain. He was dressed in a kilt and officially started the Games by banging the sword on the shield to the four winds.

By the late 1990s, although regarded highly still, the WMPC profile appeared to dip. In 1998 for example it was advertised that the winner was guaranteed a place at the World's Strongest Man competition, whereas in the 1980s and early 90s it was much more than a qualifier for the more prestigious competition, but a second world title. The profile of strength athletics in general waned in the late 1990s with less coverage on television and many events suffered, including WMPC. In 2000 there was no event held. However, in 2001 it returned. At this time a Strongman Super Series had emerged, an attempt to heighten the profile of the sport once more, and although the WMPC did not feature as part of the point scoring events on that tour, it was advertised as the Scottish Grand Prix. In 2002, the WMPC, also referred to as the Aberdeen Grand Prix, was part of the Strongman Super Series in that year. Although still known as the WMPC, being part of a Super Series was a far cry from its grander position in the 1980s and 1990s. It fell from the list of Super Series events in 2003, and no event was planned in Scotland. At this time, the town of Dolbeau-Mistassini, Quebec stepped in. Here, a reputation had been building for a number of years as a host venue for quality strength athletics and they jumped at the chance of hosting a reinvigorated WMPC. It lasted for two years in this venue but 2004 was its last outing.

At this juncture the world of strength athletics had been damaged by the split between IFSA and the World's Strongest Man with more than one organisation claiming to be the only official worldwide body. An unfortunate casualty of the rift was the WMPC.

== Results ==
Year	Champion	Runner-up	3rd place	Location
1985	(Iceland) Jón Páll Sigmarsson	(United Kingdom) / (England) Geoff Capes	(United States) Bill Kazmaier	East Kilbride, Scotland
1986	(Iceland) Jón Páll Sigmarsson	(United Kingdom) / (England) Mark Higgins	(Netherlands) Simon Wulfse	East Kilbride, Scotland
1987	(United Kingdom) / (England) Geoff Capes	(Iceland) Jón Páll Sigmarsson	(United States) Bill Kazmaier	East Kilbride, Scotland
1988	(United States) Bill Kazmaier	(United Kingdom) / (England) Geoff Capes	(Iceland) Jón Páll Sigmarsson	East Kilbride, Scotland
1989	(Iceland) Jón Páll Sigmarsson	(United Kingdom) / (England) Jamie Reeves	(Netherlands) Ab Wolders	East Kilbride, Scotland
1990	(Iceland) Jón Páll Sigmarsson	(United Kingdom) / (England) Mark Higgins	(Iceland) Hjalti Arnason	Glasgow, Scotland
1991	(Iceland) Jón Páll Sigmarsson	(United Kingdom) / (England) Jamie Reeves	(Iceland) Magnús Ver Magnússon	Ontario, Canada
1992	(United Kingdom) / (England) Jamie Reeves	(Iceland) Magnús Ver Magnússon	(Iceland) Jón Páll Sigmarsson	(To be confirmed)
1993	(Austria) Manfred Hoeberl	(To be confirmed)	(To be confirmed)	(To be confirmed)
1994	(Austria) Manfred Hoeberl	(Iceland) Magnús Ver Magnússon	(Namibia) Anton Boucher	Peterhead, Scotland
1995	(Iceland) Magnús Ver Magnússon	(United Kingdom) / (Scotland) Forbes Cowen	(United Kingdom) / (Wales) Gary Taylor	Mintlaw, Scotland
1996	(United Kingdom) / (Scotland) Forbes Cowen	(Sweden) Magnus Samuelsson	(Iceland) Torfi Ólafsson	(To be confirmed)
1997	(Latvia) Raimonds Bergmanis	(United States) Mark Philippi	(Faroe Islands) Regin Vagadal	Callander, Scotland
1998	(Finland) Jouko Ahola	(Latvia) Raimonds Bergmanis	(United States) Mark Philippi	Callander, Scotland
1999	(Canada) Hugo Girard	(United States) Mark Philippi & (Latvia) Raimonds Bergmanis		Callander, Scotland
2000	(United Kingdom) / (England) Jamie Reeves	(Finland) Riku Kiri	(Netherlands) Paul Smeets	(To be confirmed)
2001	(Canada) Hugo Girard	(Norway) Svend Karlsen	(Sweden) Magnus Samuelsson	Aberdeen, Scotland
2002	(Norway) Svend Karlsen	(Canada) Hugo Girard	(Finland) Janne Virtanen	Aberdeen, Scotland
2003	(Canada) Hugo Girard	(Poland) Mariusz Pudzianowski	(Sweden) Magnus Samuelsson	Quebec, Canada
2004	(Canada) Hugo Girard	(Ukraine) Vasyl Virastyuk	(Lithuania) Zydrunas Savickas	Quebec, Canada

- (except for third place in 2001 from )

=== Multiple time champions ===
Champion	Country	Times	Years
Jón Páll Sigmarsson	Iceland	5	1985, 1986, 1989, 1990, 1991
Hugo Girard	Canada	4	1999, 2001, 2003, 2004
Manfred Hoeberl	Austria	2	1993, 1994
Jamie Reeves	United Kingdom	2	1992, 2000

== Events ==
Events were held over two days, and over the years the events changed although popular events included:

- The Wench
- The Tree Trunk Lift
- The McGlashen stones
- The Log press
- The Basque circle
- The Anvil Hold
- The super yoke
- The Carry and Waddle

== European Muscle Power Classic ==
The European Muscle Power Classic was a continental strongman competition held between 1987 and 1997 as part of the wider Muscle Power series, serving as a European-level counterpart to the World Muscle Power Championship. Mark Higgins won the inaugural recorded title in 1987, while Jón Páll Sigmarsson secured victory in 1990. Ilkka Kinnunen won the 1993 contest, in which Bill Pittuck placed third. The 1994 edition, held in Peterhead, Scotland on 31 July 1994, was won by Manfred Höberl, with Andrés Guðmundsson finishing second and Wayne Price third. Forbes Cowan is recorded as the 1995 champion.

== See also ==
- List of strongman competitions
