= Kristinn Óskar Haraldsson =

Icelandic strongman competitor

Kristinn Óskar Boris Haraldsson
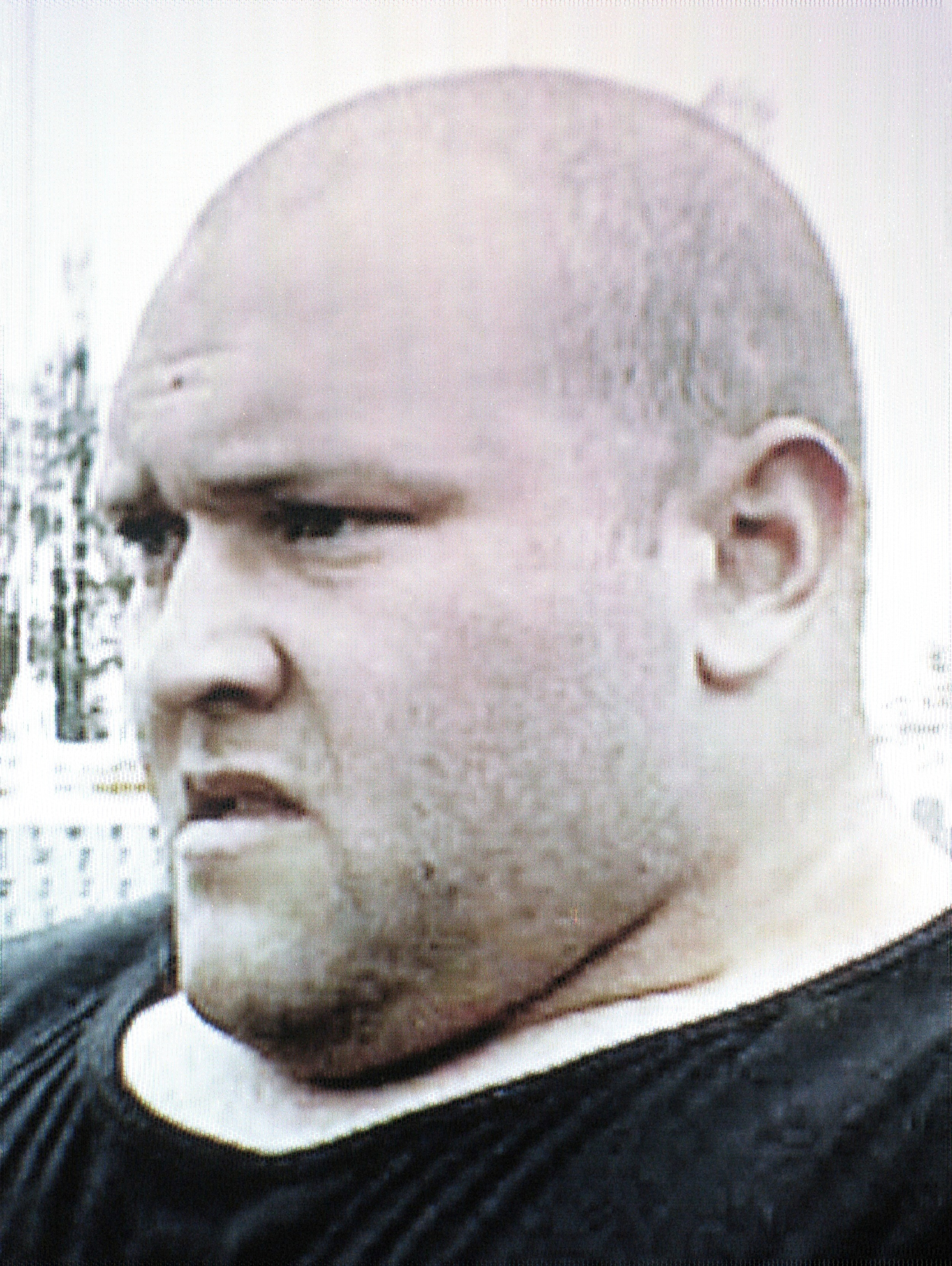
- Born: Kristinn Óskar Haraldsson; 16 March 1980 (age 46); Reykjavík, Iceland
- Occupations: Strongman; Powerlifting
- Known for: Boris Haraldsson
- Height: 6 ft 0.5 in (1.84 m)

Competition record

Strongman

Representing Iceland

World's Strongest Man
Qualified	2005 World's Strongest Man
Qualified	2006 World's Strongest Man
Qualified	2007 World's Strongest Man

Iceland's Strongest Man
3rd	2001
1st	2005
1st	2006
1st	2007
1st	2008
2nd	2009

Kristinn Óskar Haraldsson (also known by Boris Haraldsson) (born 16 March 1980) is an Icelandic Strongman and Powerlifter. He is a 4 x times Iceland's Strongest Man champion and has competed on three occasions at the World's Strongest Man.

== Biography ==
Haraldsson was born in 1980 in Reykjavík in Iceland. At the age of 21 he placed third in Iceland's Strongest Man and despite being absent from the podium from 2002 to 2004 he went on to win it four times in a row from 2005 to 2008, by defending the title against several foreign competitors including Adrian Rollinson, Don Pope and Terry Hollands. These wins in one of the most prestigious national competitions strength athletics qualified him for the World's Strongest Man on each occasion. However, in 2008 he was unable to attend and was out for most of that season due to a serious food poisoning incident and knee surgery.

He has two children, a daughter, Elva (born 1998) and a son, Christian (born 2004).

== Personal records ==
Powerlifting (performed in single-ply equipment)

- Squat – 380 kg (838 lb) (2005 KRAFT Íslandsmeistaramót í kraftlyftingum)
- Bench press – 255 kg (562 lb) (2005 KRAFT Íslandsmeistaramót í kraftlyftingum)
- Deadlift – 325 kg (717 lb) (2005 KRAFT Íslandsmeistaramót í kraftlyftingum)
- Total – 960 kg (2,116 lb) (2005 KRAFT Íslandsmeistaramót í kraftlyftingum)

Strongman

- Axle press – 166 kg (366 lb) (2009 Giants Live Mohegan Sun)
- Log press (for reps) – 125 kg (276 lb) x 13 reps (2007 World's Strongest Man - Group 4)
- Viking press (for reps) – 130 kg (287 lb) x 15 reps (2005 World's Strongest Man - Group 2)
- Rock press – 133 kg (293 lb) (2006 World's Strongest Man - Group 4)
- Keg toss (for speed) – 10 kegs (27 kg (60 lb) each) over 4.40 metres (14 ft 5 in) in 51.16 seconds (2006 World's Strongest Man - Group 4)
- Atlas stones – 5 stones weighing 100–160 kg (220–353 lb) in 34.62 seconds (2005 World's Strongest Man - Group 2)

== Competition history ==
- 2001
  - 3rd - Iceland's Strongest Man
- 2004
  - 6th - Iceland's Strongest Man
- 2005
  - 1st - Iceland's Strongest Man
  - 8th - Strongman Super Series 2005: Varberg
- 2006
  - 1st - Iceland's Strongest Man
  - 4th - Strongman Super Series 2006: Moscow
- 2007
  - 1st - Iceland's Strongest Man
  - 8th - World Strongman Cup 2007: Moscow
  - 9th - Strongman Super Series 2007: Viking Power Challenge
  - 9th - World Strongman Cup 2007: Dartford
- 2008
  - 1st - Iceland's Strongest Man
- 2009
  - 10th - Giants Live 2009: Mohegan Sun
  - 2nd - Iceland's Strongest Man
