= Andrés Guðmundsson =

Icelandic strongman (born 1965)

Personal information
- Nationality: Icelandic
- Born: 17 April 1965 (age 61) Reykjavík
- Occupation: Strongman
- Height: 6 ft 5 in (1.96 m)
- Weight: 125–150 kg (276–331 lb)
Medal record
Strongman
Representing Iceland
World Strongman Challenge
1st	1994
European Hercules
1st	1994
Strongest Man on Earth
2nd	1994
European Muscle Power Classic
2nd	1994
World Viking Challenge
2nd	1993
Iceland's Strongest Man
2nd	1990
2nd	1992
2nd	1993
2nd	1994
3rd	1996
Iceland's Strongest Man (IFSA)
1st	1999
Icelandic Power Trial Championships
1st	1991
2nd	1992
1st	1993

Andrés Guðmundsson (born 17 April 1965) is an Icelandic Strongman and Highland Games competitor. He held the titles of the World Strongman Challenge and the European Hercules.

He was also renowned for his prowess with the legendary Húsafell Stone.

== Career ==
=== Early life ===
Andrés loved sports from his childhood and played volleyball as a kid. He also developed a passion towards athletics and specialized track and field events. He showed a major interest in throwing disciplines and specialized discus and shot put and the traditional Highland Games throwing events.

His discus career resulted in him being in fourteenth place on the Icelandic all-time list with a throw of 53.02 metres (173 ft 11 in) performed for Ármann sports club, Reykjavík in 1991. In 1994 he was ranked Iceland's number 2 shot putter behind Pétur Guðmundsson (and 87th in the world) with a performance of 18.63 metres (61 ft 1 in). In 1996, he achieved his personal best of 18.84 metres (61 ft 10 in).

=== Strength athletics ===
It didn't take Andrés long to realize his natural gift of strength where he started training Strongman events and won 1991 Icelandic Power Trial Championships. The following year he emerged runner up to Magnús Ver Magnússon and regained his title again in 1993.

Also in 1993, Andrés emerged 2nd place in the World Viking Challenge. In 1994 he reached the peak of his strength athletics career, winning the World Strongman Challenge, European Hercules and coming second in the European Muscle Power Championships and Strongest Man on Earth to Manfred Hoeberl. Both the European Musclepower Championships and the Highland Games World Championships were held on a weekend on the same field in Callander, Scotland.

During mid 90s, he was widely regarded as one of the top dual threats in Highland Games and strongman, but was sidelined by a career threatening injury, a tear of his pectoral muscle. In 1999, he made a promising comeback and won the Iceland's Strongest Man (IFSA) competition in 1999. In August 1999 he had a podium finish in the Bison Highland Games, and during 2000 IFSA Helsinki Grand Prix, recurrence of the pec tear forced him to pull out making it his final strongman competition.

==== Húsafell Stone ====
Andrés is specially noted for his prowess with the legendary Húsafell Stone, carrying the 186 kg (410 lb) stone around the sheep and goat pen for nearly two full revolutions in the mid 80s, beating the likes of Jón Páll Sigmarsson, Magnús Ver Magnússon and Hjalti Árnason, all in their prime. Even though his benchmark was narrowly edged by Canada's Gregg Ernst during 1992 World's Strongest Man, it remained 'convincingly' unbeaten for the next 30 years, until the emergence of Hafþór Júlíus Björnsson.

== Personal records ==
- Húsafell Stone – 186 kg (410 lb) for nearly two revolutions around the sheep & goat pen (Date unknown) (Former World Record)

→ Even though the exact distance was not measured, some historians speculate it to be between 64–67 metres (210–220 ft)
Andrés has also carried the stone during Winter around the snow covered pen for 57.30 metres (188 ft 0 in) at 1993 World Viking Challenge.

- Judas Stone carry for speed – 127 kg (280 lb) for 50 metres in 26.96 seconds (1993 Iceland's Strongest Viking) (World Record)
- Atlas Stones – 4 stones weighing 110–155 kg (243–342 lb) to a 4 ft platform (1994 Strongest Man on Earth)
- Log press – 130 kg (287 lb) (1993 World Viking Challenge)
- Viking press – 120 kg (265 lb) x 8 reps (2000 IFSA Finland Grand Prix)
- Discus throw – 2 kg (4 lb) for 53.02 metres (173 ft 11 in) (1991)
- Shot put – 7.3 kg (16 lb) for 18.84 metres (61 ft 10 in) (1996)
- Weight over bar – 25.5 kg (56 lb) over 5.03 metres (16 ft 6 in) (1993 World Viking Challenge)
- Samson's barrow push – 800 kg (1,764 lb) for 8.00 metres (26 ft 3 in) course in 10.04 seconds (1994 Strongest Man on Earth) (World Record)
- Arm over Arm Cannon pull – 1,250 kg (2,756 lb) for 18.50 metres (60 ft 8 in) (1994 Strongest Man on Earth)

== Personal life and career after sport ==
Andrés is married to Lára Helgadóttir. They have two sons, Axel Óskar Andrésson and Jökull Andrésson, who both are professional football players.

Following his retirement, Andrés initiated Skólahreysti (School of Fitness) together with his wife Lára Helgadóttir. Its aim was to encourage children to take part in a wide-ranging sporting experience based on their general physical education curriculum. The first contest was held in 2005 with six schools participating and it quickly became a popular event in Iceland. 110 schools participated in 2009 season and its final which was broadcast live by RÚV had 49% of the entire Icelandic population tuned in.
