= Torfi Ólafsson =

Icelandic strongman competitor and powerlifter

Personal information
- Born: 13 April 1965 (age 61) Iceland
- Occupation(s): Strongman, powerlifter
- Height: 201 cm (6 ft 7 in)
Medal record
Strongman
Representing Iceland
World's Strongest Man
| Qualified | 1995 World's Strongest Man |
| 4th | 1997 World's Strongest Man |
| 7th | 1998 World's Strongest Man |
| 7th | 1999 World's Strongest Man |
| Qualified | 2000 World's Strongest Man |
World Muscle Power Championships
| 3rd | 1996 |
Iceland's Strongest Man
| 1st | 1997 |
| 3rd | 1998 |
| 2nd | 1999 |
| 2nd | 2000 |
Icelandic Power Trial Championships
| 2nd | 1995 |
Powerlifting
Representing Iceland
IPF Juniors' World Powerlifting Championships
| 1st | 1985 |
| Disqualified | 1986 |
| 2nd | 1988 |
EPF Men's Junior European Powerlifting Championships
| 1st | 1985 |
| 2nd | 1988 |

Torfi Olafsson (born 13 April 1965) is an Icelandic former strongman competitor and junior world champion powerlifter. He was one of the biggest competitors from Iceland to compete at the World's Strongest Man, standing 201 cm (6 ft 7 in) and weighing 190 kg (420 lb).

== Biography ==
Torfi was born on 13 April 1965. His father was in the road construction industry and Torfi began working for him as early as seven years old. He spent his summers helping his father until he was seventeen. He became the Icelandic powerlifting champion and at the age of 20 won the IPF Junior World Powerlifting Championship. He repeated this feat the following year, but his results were later annulated due to positive doping testing. As a senior, he placed ninth a number of years later. He also won the EPF Junior European Championships in 1985.

Like a number of his compatriots he turned to strength athletics and on the strongman circuit was very successful. He won Iceland's Strongest Man in 1997 and was placed third in the prestigious World Muscle Power Championships in 1996. Of the five World's Strongest Man contests he entered, his highest place was fourth in 1997. He was also a keen Highland Games competitor.

Outside of sport Torfi worked in Iceland with the mentally handicapped and is married with four children, 5 grandchildren and a dog. His daughter Kristin Helga Torfadottir is a powerlifter of growing reputation. His son Stefán Karel Torfason became Iceland's Strongest Man in 2021.

== Personal records ==
- Deadlift (Raw) – 370.5 kg (817 lb)
- Farmers hold (with straps) – 200 kg (441 lb) in each hand for 38.16 seconds (1999 Europe's Strongest Man) (World Record)
- Latra stones loading onto barrels – 4 stones weighing 96–177 kg (212–390 lb) in 38.34 seconds (1998 Westfjord's Viking)
