= Magnús Magnússon (strongman) =

Icelandic strongman

- Born: Iceland
- Occupation: Strongman
- Height: 194 cm (6 ft 4 in)
- Relatives: Benedikt Magnússon (brother)

Competition record

Strongman

Representing Iceland

Iceland's Strongest Man
2nd	2001
1st	2002

Iceland's Strongest Viking
3rd	2002
2nd	2005

IFSA Strongman World Team Championships
4th	2005 Team Scandinavia

IFSA Nordic Championships
10th	2005

Magnús Magnússon is an Icelandic strongman competitor and former winner of Iceland's Strongest Man.

== Strongman career ==
Magnús won the 2002 Iceland's Strongest Man contest, his career best win. He was also the runner up in 2001 behind Magnús Ver Magnússon. He also had podium finishes in Iceland's Strongest Viking in 2002 and 2005, placing third and second respectively.

Magnús is the brother of fellow Iceland's Strongest Man and raw deadlift world record holder Benedikt Magnússon.

=== Personal records ===
- Elevated Deadlift – 380 kg (838 lb) (2005 Westfjord's Viking)
- Keg toss – 20 kg (44 lb) over 5.40 metres (17 ft 9 in) (2005 Westfjord's Viking)
