= Jón Páll Sigmarsson Classic =

Strongman competition in Iceland

- 2010-2012

Tournament information
- Location: Reykjavík, Iceland
- Month played: November
- Established: 2010
- Format: Multi-event competition

Final champion
- (Iceland) Hafþór Júlíus Björnsson

Jón Páll Sigmarsson Classic was an annual strongman competition held in Iceland, with the participation of international athletes from various countries. The event was established in 2010 by Hjalti Árnason, who was a childhood friend, training partner and a fellow strongman contestant of the late Jón Páll Sigmarsson who the competition was named after.

The competition took place annually for 3 consecutive years during the Icelandic fitness & health expo and included events such as max Deadlift, arm-over-arm pull, farmer’s walk, overhead medleys and Atlas Stones.

== Event results ==
| Year | Champion | Runner-up | 3rd place | Location |
|---|---|---|---|---|
| 2010 | (United States) Brian Shaw | (Iceland) Hafþór Júlíus Björnsson | (United Kingdom) Mark Felix | Laugardalshöll Stadium; Reykjavík, Iceland |
| 2011 | (United States) Brian Shaw | (United Kingdom) Laurence Shahlaei | (Iceland) Páll Logason | Laugardalshöll Stadium; Reykjavík, Iceland |
| 2012 | (Iceland) Hafþór Júlíus Björnsson | (United Kingdom) Mark Felix | (Iceland) Páll Logason | Laugardalshöll Stadium; Reykjavík, Iceland |
