= Chikaraishi =

Heavy rocks used in Japan for weightlifting

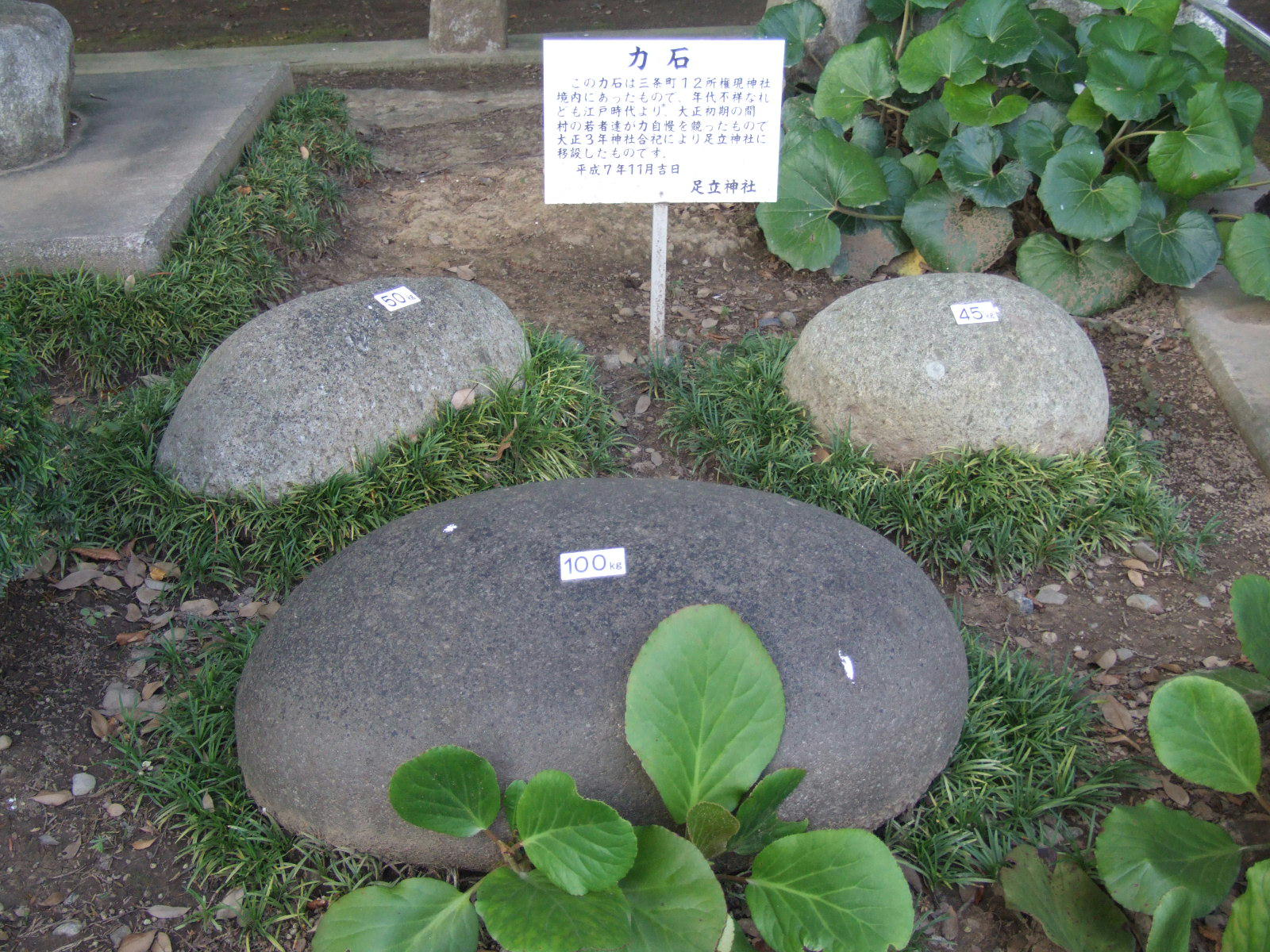
Chikaraishi at the Adachi Shrine

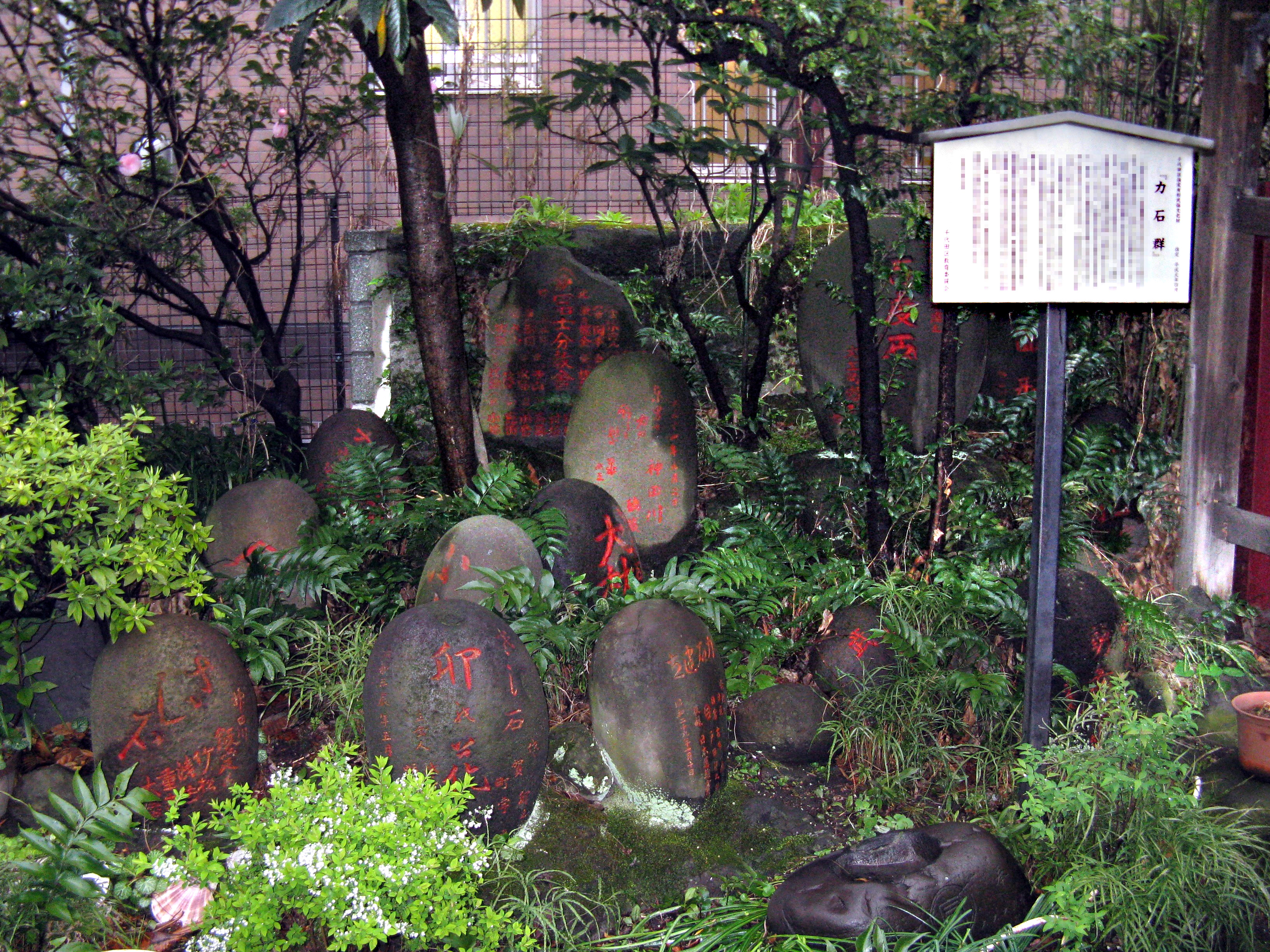
Chikaraishi at Yanagimori-jinja

Chikaraishi (Japanese: 力石; lit. 'strength stones'), also hakari-ishi (秤石; 'weighing stones') or bijuru (Okinawan), are heavy rocks used at least since the 8th century CE in Japan to develop or demonstrate physical strength. Commonly found within Shinto shrines, they were used for competition, divination, physical fitness and entertainment; some famous examples have also become tourist attractions, and many have been recognised as Important Cultural Assets by the Japanese Government.

Competitive stone-lifting is still continued in modern times, and a number of competitive forms of stone-lifting exist, employing different physical techniques.

== History ==
Strength-stones are found throughout Japan, often at Shinto shrines. In 2005 around 14,000 strength-stones were recorded in shrines around Japan. Of these, around 300 are designated as Important Cultural Assets. Many are inscribed with the names and feats of those who lifted them. The oldest-known inscribed stone is from Shinobu, and dates to 1664. The first recorded incidence of strength-stone lifting is attributed to the samurai Kamakura Gongorō Kagemasa in 1089, however the practice itself is much older, dating to before the 8th century. The Nippo Jisho, also called the Vocabvlario da Lingoa de Iapam, a Japanese – Portuguese dictionary published in 1603, includes the term chikaraishi in the written record as early as the 17th century. The Nippo Jisho, published in Nagasaki and associated with the Jesuit priest João Rodrigues (1561 or 1562 – 1633), identically records both the modern pronunciation and written form of the term chikaraishi.^{A}

It is one of the few traditional sports not solely the preserve of the samurai class, being popular among peasants and sake brewers. Both professions valued the manual labor of young people, and similar practices called kyokumochi also existed, which involved lifting sacks of rice or barrels of sake. The sporting aspect of stone-lifting developed in Edo around the seventeenth century, likely evolving from the sack-lifting contests of the stevedores and labourers. Historically, the lifting of strength-stones was exclusively practiced by men.

The practice of lifting strength-stones was especially popular in the 19th and early 20th centuries (roughly coinciding with the Meiji period), with organised competitions occurring. Stones used in competition were usually inscribed with their weight, measured in kan (貫) (a unit of approximately 3.75 kg (8 lb)), and if not naturally smooth, were often sculpted into a roughly oval shape.

Some strength-stones have become tourist attractions due to the legends attached to them. In Nerima, for example, tourists still visit Sobei's Horse-Headed Kannon Stone, a strength-stone associated with the tale of Kato Sobei from 1840. According to the story, Sobei was awarded possession of a heavy stone that he managed to lift. However, his horse collapsed and died under the weight of the stone, and in its memory, he erected the stone as the horse's grave marker. Another famous stone is the Benkei-ishi, a huge rock supposedly moved from present-day Himeji, Hyōgo, Hyōgo Prefecture, to its current resting place on Mount Shosha by the folk hero Benkei (1155–1189). The Benkei-ishi can be viewed at Engyō-ji, high above Himeji.

== Purpose ==
A general lack of recorded evidence makes it difficult to ascertain the intended purpose of stone-lifting. It has been assumed that the practice was for competition, physical fitness or entertainment purposes (sumo wrestlers have been known to perform such feats between bouts for the entertainment of their audience). Records of competition techniques and winners (such as the 1836 list of "Men of Strength in Edo", which ranks competitors by weights lifted) indicate a competitive aspect.

Strength-stones are used in modern times for strength training, particularly in the martial arts where such practices are known as hojo undō. Special stones are manufactured for this purpose, usually with a wooden handle to aid their manipulation; such stones are also known as chi ishi. It is a common practice in karate, used in solo training to improve stances and upper body strength.

=== In divination ===
The prevalence of the stones in Shinto shrines and temples has led to speculation that rock-lifting was used for divining the future, a practice known as ishi-ura (石占). The ease with which a petitioner lifted the stones indicated the likelihood of his preferred outcome occurring. Ishi-ura was notably practiced in ancient Shinano Province, now modern-day Nagano Prefecture. Smaller versions of these stones were sometimes placed by a child's bed, in the belief that this would strengthen the child.

=== As a sport ===
Several forms of competition were employed in stone-lifting, each sometimes using a particular type of stone. Ishizashi (石差; "various stones") was the simplest form, requiring competitors to hoist a rock of about 70 kg (154 lb), known as a sashi-ishi (サシ石), from the ground to above the head. It was permissible for participants to pause and readjust their grip once the rock was at chest height. Ishikatsugi (石担; "shoulder carried stone") contests required that the stone be lifted to the shoulder; this form employed heavier rocks (up to 240 kg (529 lb)), known as a katage-ishi (カタゲ石), and allowed the use of a rope wrapped around the stone. In ishihakobi (石運び; "stone carrying") competitions, the aim was to carry the stone as far as possible, the winner naturally being the man who carried it the greatest distance, whilst ashiuke (足受; "foot receiving") contests featured extremely heavy stones that were lifted with the feet by competitors lying on their backs. Rocks that were too heavy to be lifted clear of the ground were employed in ishiokoshi (石起し; "stone raising"), using a type of stone called the chigiri-ishi (チギリ石), the aim of which was to raise a stone so that it was balanced on its edge.

Stone-lifting contests still take place in the modern era. The city of Sōja, Okayama, hosts an annual competition in which local teams participate.

== See also ==
- Lifting stone

== Footnote ==
A.The Nippo Jisho romanizes "chikaraishi" as "chicara ixi"; the difference in spelling reflects the early Portuguese romanization of the Japanese language, not a difference between the early 17th century and modern pronunciations of the name.
