= Perurena =

Perurena is a surname of Navarran Basque origin. Notable people with the surname include:

- Domingo Perurena (born 1943), Spanish cyclist
- Iñaki Perurena (born 1956), Basque strongman
- José Perurena (born 1945), Spanish sprint canoer
