= Harri-jasotzaileak =

Basque rural sport

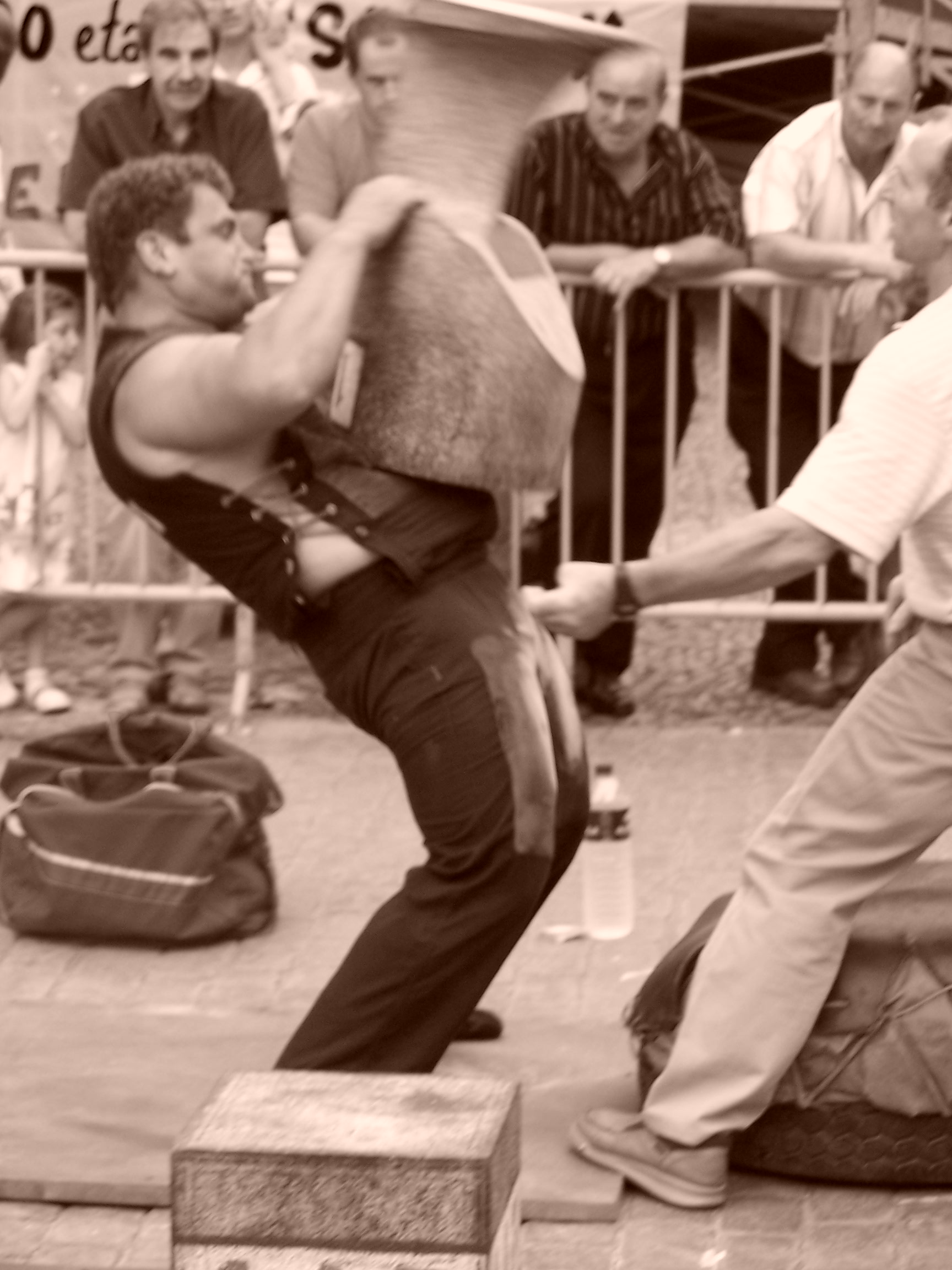
An harri-jasotzailea lifting a stone.

Harri-jasotzeaileak (Basque pronunciation: [ˌharijaˈs̺ots̻e]), or harri-jasotzea, is a popular rural sport in the Basque Country (northern Spain) in which stones of various shapes and sizes must be lifted off the ground and onto the shoulder.

The name is built on the Basque root harri "stone", the verb jaso "to lift", the agentive suffix -tzaile and the plural ending -ak, so literally "stone lifters". The sports activity is properly known as harri-jasotzea "stone lifting". In Spanish it is called levantamiento de piedra (stone lifting) and in French the sport is called leveurs de pierres.

== Rules ==
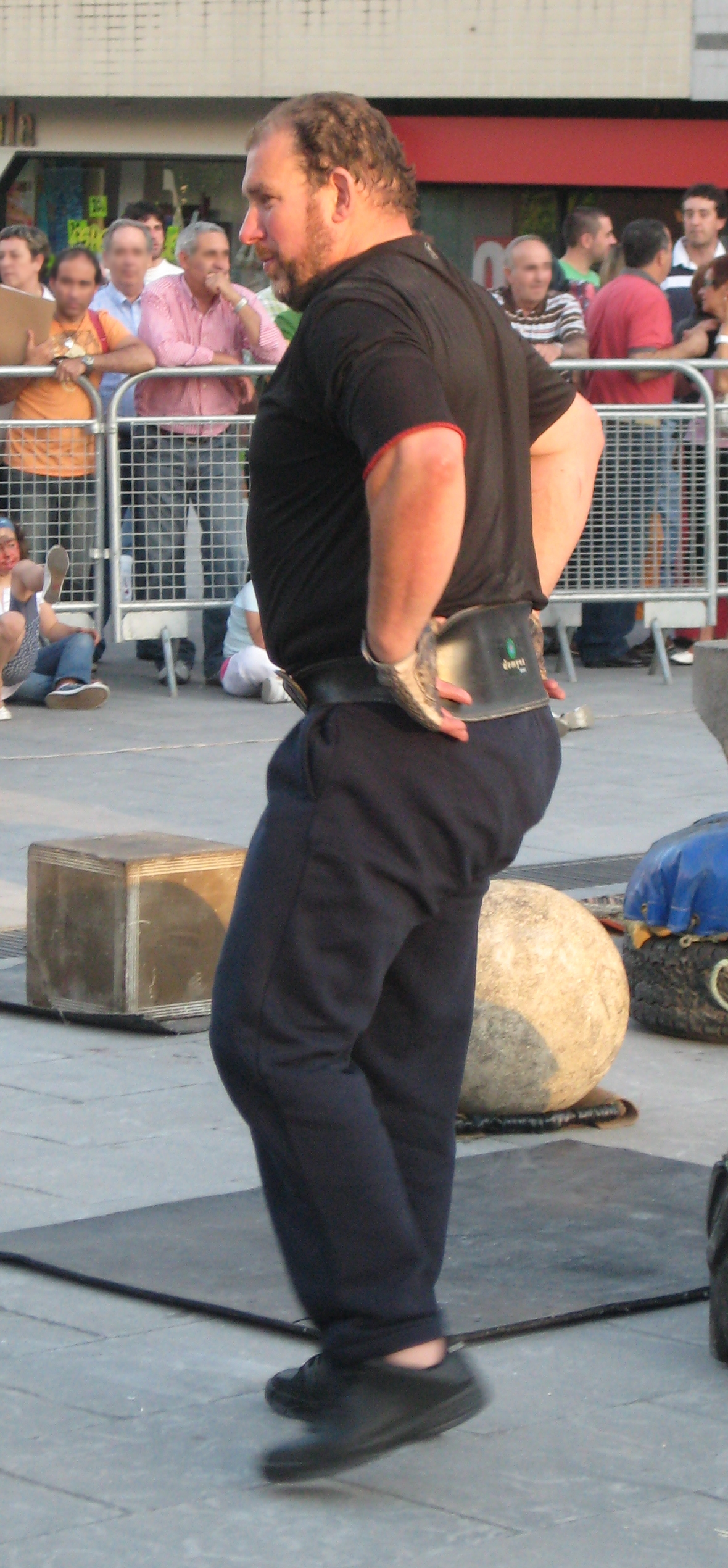
Iñaki Perurena in 2008. In the background, cubic and round stones can be seen.

There are four main categories of stone in use today, all of which come with different weights. The weight of the stones is traditionally measured arroba (12.5 kg) but normally given in kg today.

- the zilindroa (cylinder), usually weighing 8, 9 or 10 arroba (100, 112.5 or 125 kg)
- the laukizuzena (rectangular), usually weighing between 10 and 17 arroba (125-212.5 kg)
- the kuboa (cube), usually weighing between 10 and 17 arroba (125-212.5 kg)
- the biribila (round), usually weighing 9 or 10 arroba (112.5 or 125 kg)

On occasion natural stones are also still used. This can be problematic for lifters of a smaller stature who may not be able to handle the larger, irregular shaped stones.

The rules are fairly simple: the stone has to be handled so it ends up on the competitors shoulder, at which point it can be dropped onto the pad in front of the harri-jasotzaile. They never lift simultaneously but in sequence and facing each other, not side by side. There are two judges next to him, one to mark the time limit and another to ensure that the stone has been properly lifted. The crowd normally shouts out the number of times the stone has been lifted and the person who lifts the stone most often in the allocated time wins.

Alternatively, the competition may involve trying to lift a heavier stone than one's opponent's or to break a record.

The preferred material for the stones is the so-called harri beltza or black stone, a dark granite quarried near the towns of Zumarraga and Lastur in Gipuzkoa.

== Famous events ==
Several lifting events are remembered widely:

- Mieltxo Saralegi for lifting the heaviest stone to date, weighing 329 kg.
- Iñaki Perurena who held the record before Saralegi for lifting a 322 kg stone, being a popular figure in the Basque soap Goenkale and a bertsolari.

It is not uncommon for stone lifters to lift into considerably high age. In 1960 for example Justo Gallastegi lifted a 150 kg stone 5 times in 5 minutes in Tolosa.

Memorable competitions or competitors often lead to the composition of bertsos.

== History ==
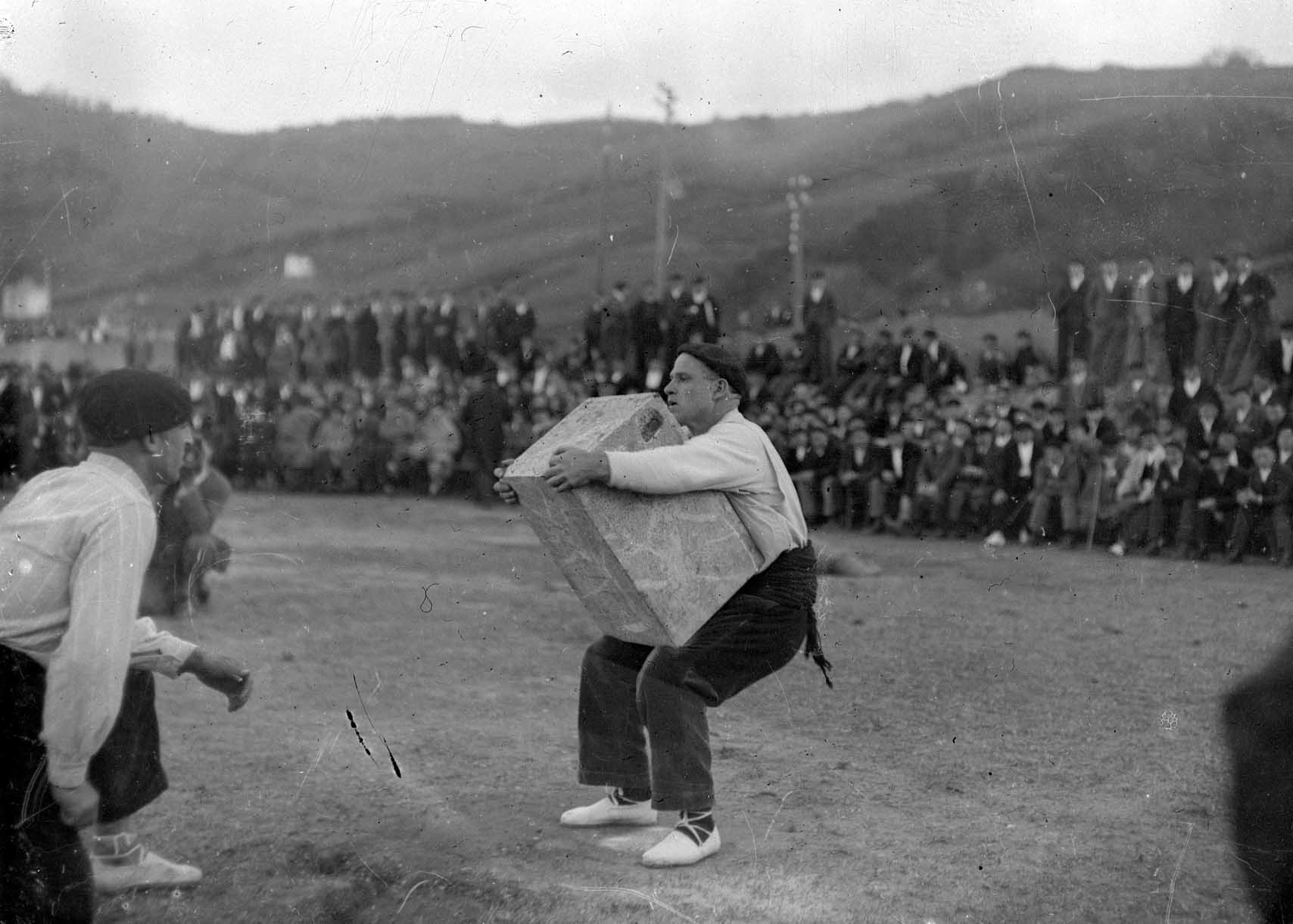
Arteondo lifting a 15 arro stone in Deba in 1924.

Although it is likely that this is an old sport, closely linked to rural farming activities, there are no documents of any significant age which mention this either as a sport or an activity. This has led to the wry saying that harri-jasotzea is "the oldest sport with the shortest history".

In the early days of harri-jasotzea every lifter was able to choose their own stone. This lasted well into the 20th century until Bittor Zabala, more commonly known as Arteondo, whose own career as a stone lifter lasted from 1910 to 1945, initiated the process of standardising the shapes and weights of the stones. He was also instrumental in popularising the sport from an activity practised at the family farm into a sport practised in public.

== Women and harri-jasotzea ==
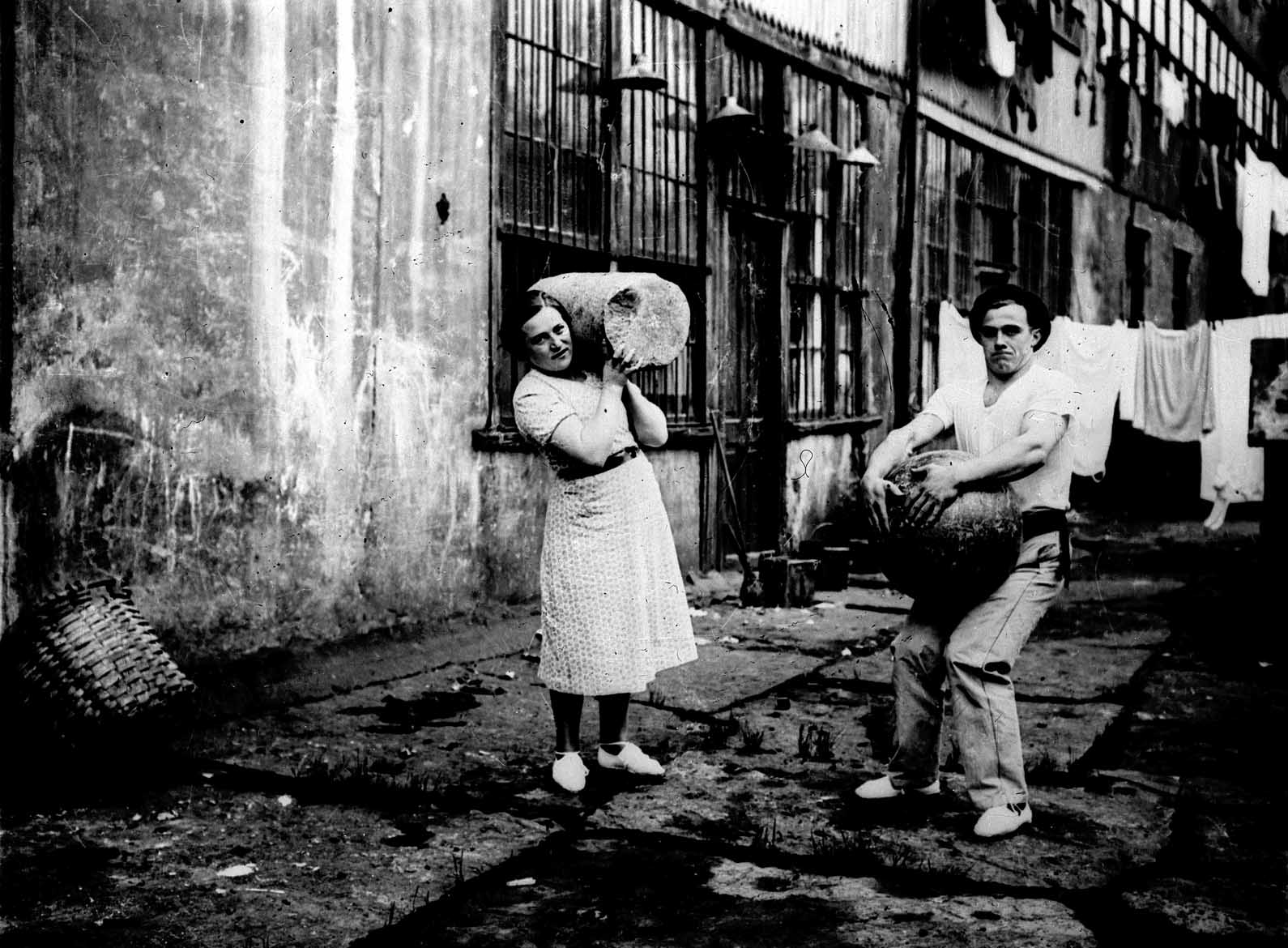
The female harri-jasotzaile Damasa Agirregabiria lifting an 8 arro stone on the left, and Errekartetxo (Santos Iriarte) lifting a round stone on the right.

Although a male dominated sport, women have taken–and are taking—part in stone lifting competitions, as they have in other traditional Basque sports.

== Similar traditions ==
Very similar sports or challenges like this occur in a number of cultures:

- the clachan-ultaich of the Scottish Gael
- the lifting of stones such as the Hálfdrættingur in Iceland
- the Bavarian Stoalupfn
- the Gŵyl Mabsant (Saint's Day) tradition of Y Garreg Orchest in Wales
- Dash kodirer (Даш кодурер) in Tuva
- Chikaraishi in Japan

== See also ==
- Basque rural sports
- History of physical training and fitness
