= Mount Shosha =

Mountain in Himeji, Japan

- 書写山
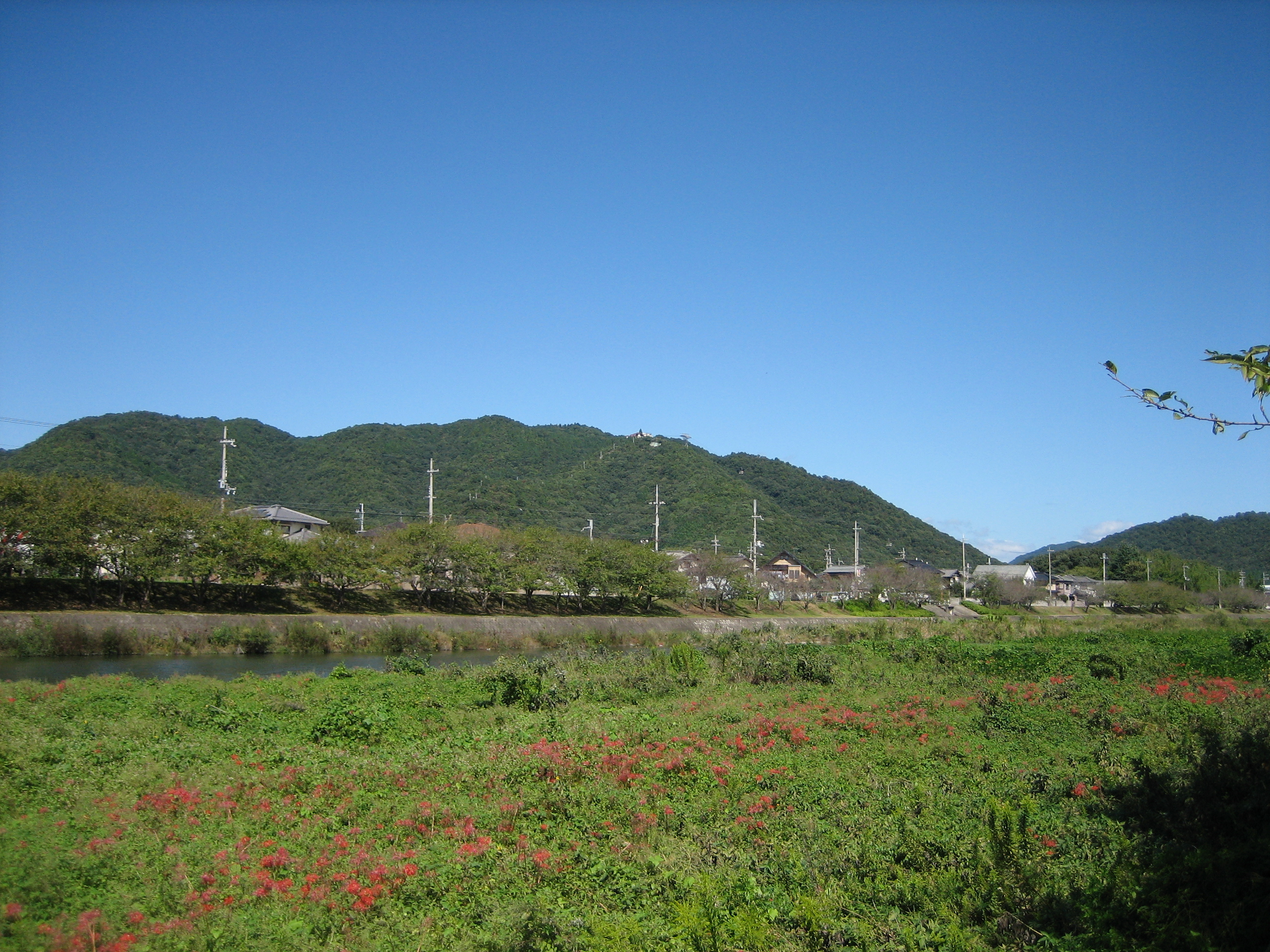
- View of Mount Shosha from southeastern Yumesaki River

Highest point
- Elevation: 371 m (1,217 ft)
- Listing: List of mountains in Japan
- Coordinates: 34°53′34″N 134°39′22″E

Geography
- Location within Japan
- Location: Himeji, Hyōgo Prefecture, Japan

Mount Shosha (書写山, Shosha-zan) is a mountain located in Himeji, Hyōgo. It is part of the Seiban Kyūryō Prefectural Natural Park, and is designated as a wildlife sanctuary (special protection area) in Hyōgo Prefecture, as well as being selected as one of the 100 Hyogo Forests and 50 Furusato Hyogo Mountains.

A temple Engyō-ji of the Saigoku Kannon Pilgrimage is located at the top
