= Lifting stone =

Heavy natural stone lifted by people in strength competitions

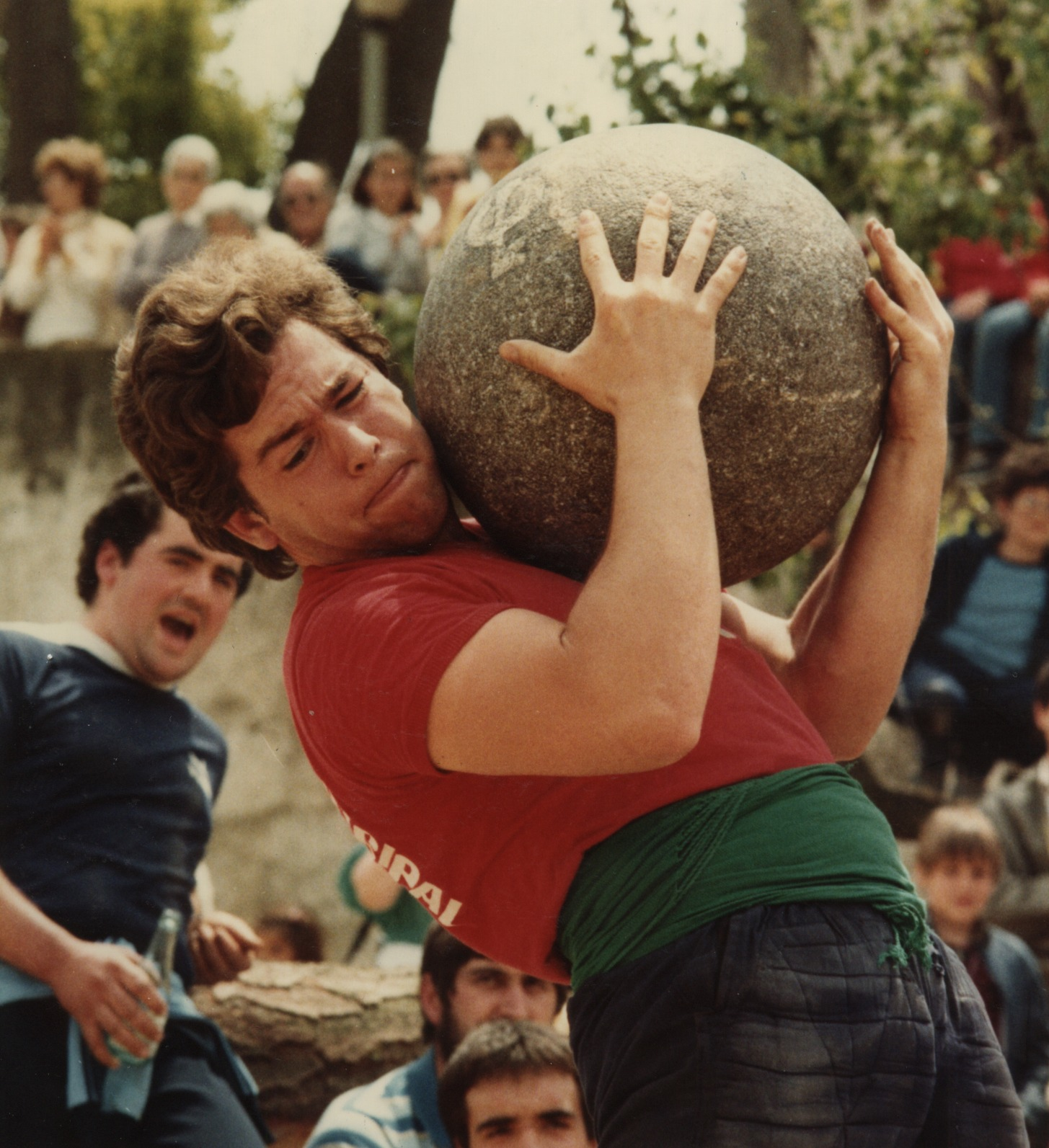
Lifting a stone at an harri-jasotzaile event in the Basque Country

Lifting stones are heavy natural stones which people are challenged to lift, proving their strength. They are common throughout Northern Europe, particularly Iceland (where they are referred to as steintökin), Scotland, Ireland, Basque Country in northern Spain, Faroe Islands, Wales, north west England centred on Cumbria, Switzerland, southern Germany centred around Bavaria, Austria, Scandinavia, Greece and also in the United States and parts of Asia such as Japan.

Recently, lifting stones have been incorporated into the World's Strongest Man and other similar strongman competitions, using various cast, found, or established challenge stones such as the Húsafell Stone, Dinnie Stones, Inver Stones and Odd Haugen Tombstone. There are also modernized versions of events derived from ancient contests, in which athletes load heavy spherical stones onto a platform, known as Atlas stones.

Famous lifting stones from around the world and the greatest stone lifters in strongman are listed below.

== Iceland ==
Icelandic stonelifting roots have an ancient history going back to c. 874 – 1056, with sagas about Orm Storolfsson, Finnbogi and Grettir Ásmundarson. Chronicles around 16th century state that lifting stones were traditionally used to qualify men for work on Icelandic fishing boats. Centuries ago, when approximately sixty fishing boats were operating, it required a practical way to quickly test whether someone was capable of working as a crew member. The stones not only became the formal interview but also sorted them to ranks. The ultimate objective was to reach "fullsterkur" status, by lifting the heaviest stone, proving the man is 'fully strong'. Some famous Icelandic lifting stones are described below.

=== Icelandic lifting stones ===
==== Húsafell Stone ====
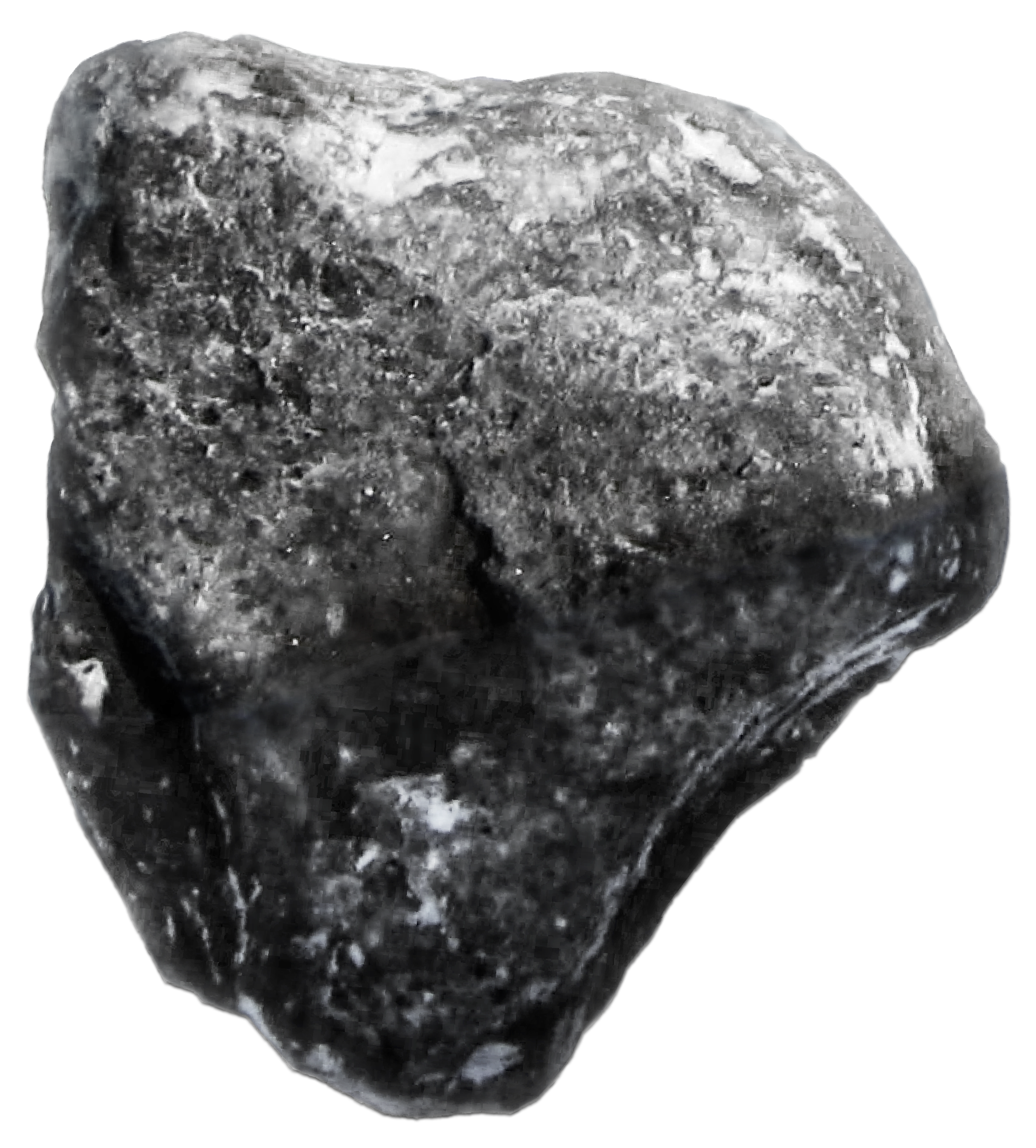
186 kg (410 lb) Húsafell Stone

The most famous legendary lifting stone in the world is the Húsafell Stone, named after the west country farming estate where it is located, about 132 km north east from Reykjavík. The iconic triangular-shaped stone which weighs 156 kg (344 lb) is said to have been crafted from a large rock, back in 1756, by a local pastor named Snorri Björnsson. Nicknamed the 'Kviahellan' (pen slab) by Snorri, he used it as the gate to his sheep and goat pen, ensuring the animals remain in the pen without escaping. The stone has since been used by strongmen as a test of strength.

According to Icelandic folklore, there are three levels to which your physical strength is measured by the stone. In ascending capacity they are amlóði, hálfsterkur and fullsterkur. Someone who could break the floor with the stone (lift the stone from the ground) which is already a substantial feat of strength, is called lazybones (amlóði in Icelandic), while anyone who could squat down, lap and lift it up to their waist level would be considered half-strong (hálfsterkur in Icelandic). However, for the iconic Icelandic full-strong status (fullsterkur in Icelandic), a person should lift it up to their chest, stand with it and walk it around the approximately 34 metre (112 ft) perimeter for a full 360° revolution around the sheep and goat pen. This final level can only be achieved by someone with extreme physical strength, stamina and endurance as hoisting the massive stone on to the chest while standing compresses the thorax and decreases lung capacity significantly.

==== Dritvík Stones ====
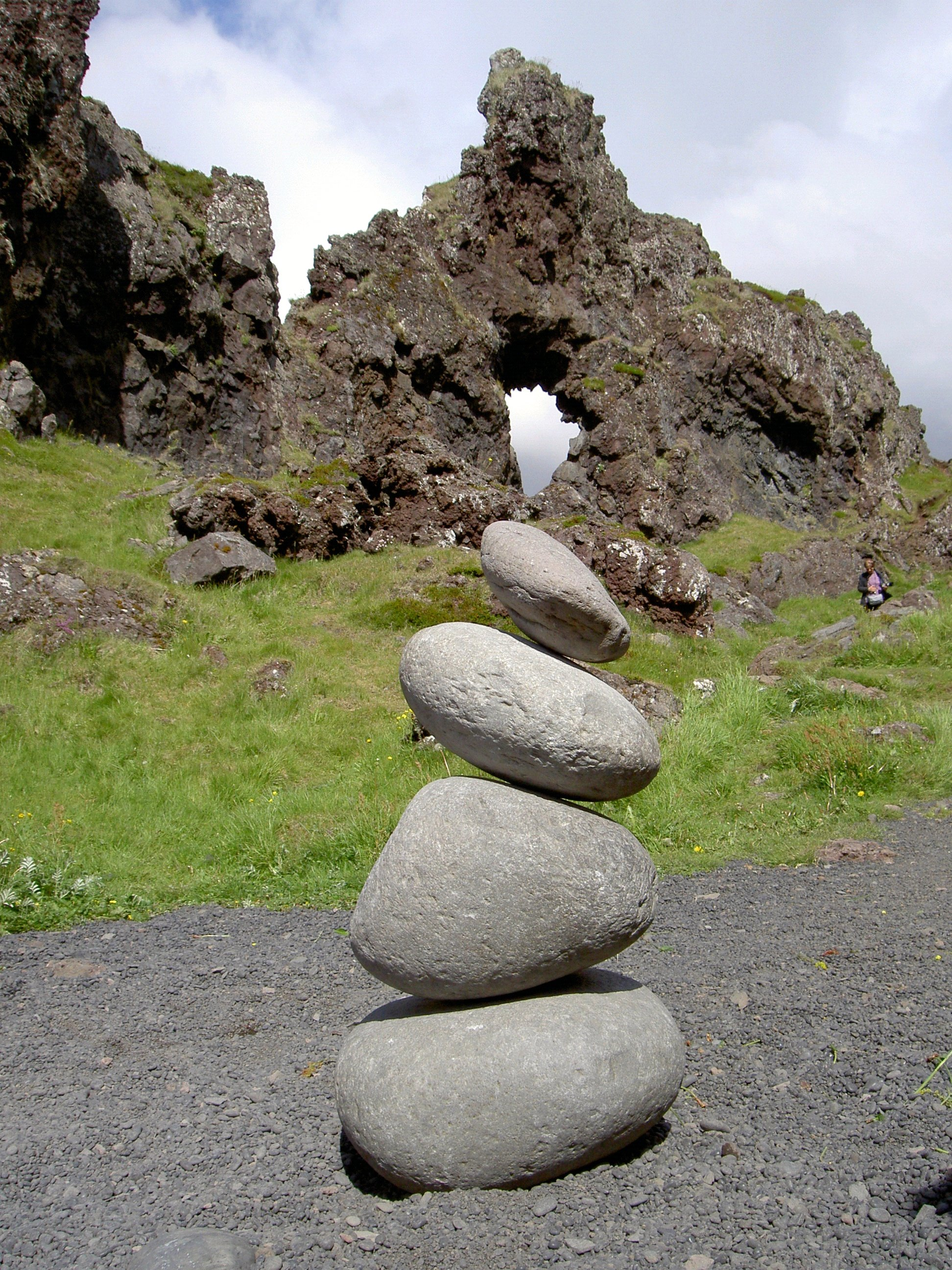
Dritvik stones

At the tip of the west coast, on Djúpalónssandur beach at the foot of Snæfellsjökull, at the western end of the Snæfellsnes peninsula, lies four legendary stones called Dritvík stones which dates back to the 14th century. Historically, the sailors who rowed out from this port were asked to lift each stone onto a natural plinth called 'Stallurinn', to prove their worth to be a ship's crew member and also to decide their ranks and share of the catch. For example, to qualify as an oarsman a man would have to lift the hálfdrættingur onto the plinth, hoisting the hálfsterkur would make you a 'steersman' (second in command) and the fullsterkur would make you 'skipari' (master of the boat). The plinth had been around waist height, but throughout centuries almost all of it is now buried beneath the dark sand. Today, lifters prefer to lift the stones up to chest level and stand tall with them for a good lift.

The four stones are classified as:

- Amlóði (hamlet or "weakling" ) at 23 kg (51 lb)
- Hálfdrættingur ("half-carrier") at 54 kg (119 lb)
- Hálfsterkur ("half strength") at 100 kg (220 lb)
- Fullsterkur ("full strength") at 154 kg (340 lb)

==== Judas Stone ====
Located in the Látravík cove at the westernmost point of the Westfjords region, the Judas Stone earned its name more than a century ago, when local farmers repeatedly tried to use it in the construction of a wall, only to have it 'betray' them like Judas Iscariot by always slipping out of place due to its unbalanced nature. The stone which weighs 127 kg (280 lb) has been used during the 80s and 90s in Icelandic strongman competitions where it had to be carried for 50 metres in the fastest time.

==== Latra Stones ====
Also located in the Westfjords region between Tálknafjörður and Bíldudalur in the famous seabird cliffs are four stones called Latra Stones. For many generations, local fishermen used them to stay fit and to gain bragging rights in their little time on dry land. They have been used in Icelandic strongman competitions where competitors had to load them on top of oil barrels. Like in Dritvík Stones, there is a hierarchy based on their size:

- Amlóði at 96 kg (212 lb)
- Hálfsterkur at 107 kg (236 lb)
- Fullsterkur at 144 kg (317 lb)
- Alsterkur at 177 kg (390 lb)

There is also an additional fifth stone called 'Klofi stone' weighing 200 kg (441 lb).

==== Brynjólfstak ====
The heaviest of Iceland's natural lifting stones is the 281.5 kg (621 lb) Brynjólfstak, which is a 1.5 meter long basalt located near Tálknafjörður in the Westfjords region. Legend says that the stone was first pulled from the sea in 1845, when a mighty farmer named Brynjólfur Eggertsson asked four of the strongest men in the area to lift the giant slab on to his shoulders. From there, Brynjólfur is said to have attached the stone to him with straps and carried it uphill, to the nearby ridge where it is currently located. The stone has since been named in his honor as Brynjólfstak (Brynjólfur's finger) due to the elongated shape of the stone.

==== Leggstein (Tombstone) ====
This smooth and pillar-like stone is said to mark the spot where an unfortunate farmer made a pact with the devil. As the story goes, the lazy farmer wanted a fast track to an easier, more prosperous life, so the devil offered him his dream if he could simply complete one task: lifting the 220 kg (485 lb) Leggstein. It is located in the middle of the Westfjords region in Heydalur near Reykjanes. The legend says the farmer is buried under the massive plinth near the stone, to be carried around the plinth for several revolutions for his salvation.

==== Petursstein ====
In front of the Dynjandi waterfall in the Westfjords lies a black slate stone known as the Petursstein (Petur's stone) weighing 175 kg (386 lb). It is to be lapped and hoisted on to a large plinth. The stone was named after Pètur Gudmundsson and was at least 15 kg (33 lb) heavier back in the day before a piece of it broke off.

==== Arbaer Stones ====
Located at Árbæjarsafn open-air museum in Reykjavík, are two sets of stones collectively known as the Arbaer Stones. First set is a collection of eight natural stones which are to be either lapped or lifted to chest height. The lightest weighs 81 kg (179 lb) and the heaviest two weigh 130 kg (287 lb) and 143 kg (315 lb). Second set contains two very heavy rectangularly carved man made stones with iron handles fixed to them. The lighter of the two weighs 254 kg (560 lb), and heavier one weighs 304 kg (670 lb).

==== Fludir Stones ====
At 'Mountain Villa' cabin at Flúðir are six natural stones whose formation dates back to the Pleistocene epoch. The stones originated as Magma which hurled red hot from Snæfellsjökull volcanic crater 4,800 ft above sea level. Throughout centuries, gravity pulled them down to the shore where North Atlantic waves continued to shape and polish them. Despite the sixth and final stone weighs 118 kg (260 lb), the first three of them are light and are meant for children to start their stone-lifting. They are to be lifted onto a hexagonal basalt column.

==== Horse Stone ====
Near Akureyri in northern Iceland lies a 250 kg (551 lb) pentagonal stone with an iron handle drilled to it from its top. According to a local legend, it is said to have been swung around by a farmer. Jón Páll Sigmarsson managed to lift the stone for 10 repetitions.

==== Others ====
- Bessasteinn - 4 stones weighing up to 90 kg (198 lb)
- Brúarásskóli stone - 130 kg (287 lb)
- Engjasteinar (Meadow stone) - 3 stones
- Haukadalur (Hawk-valley stone)
- Hestastein at Laufas turf house
- Myrdalssandur - 3 stones
- Pakgil stones - 3 stones
- Porsteinshaf sea stone/ Hero stone
- Sjómannagarðurinn (Fisherman's park stone)
- Vegatorfustein

== Scotland ==
In Scotland, lifting stones were used throughout generations as a tests of strength. 'Clach cuid fir' which is Gaelic for 'manhood stones' were used for young men to welcome into manhood when they were able to lift their clan's testing stone to waist height. The traditional stone put is also a famous sport in ancient Scotland. Some famous Scottish lifting stones are described below.

=== Scottish lifting stones ===
==== Dinnie Stones ====
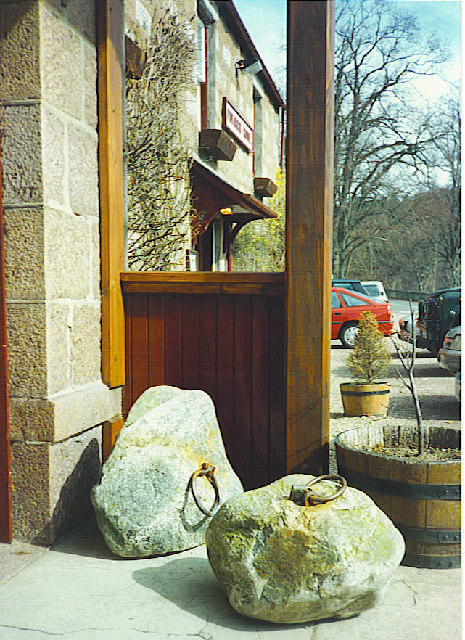
Dinnie Stones

The most famous among Scotland's legendary lifting stones are the Dinnie Stones. They are a pair of stones with metal rings fixed to each, located in Potarch, Aberdeenshire and made famous by strongman Donald Dinnie. Weighing 332.5 kg (733 lb) combined, the heavier stone weighs 188 kg (414 lb) and the lighter stone weighs 144.5 kg (319 lb). They were selected in the 1830s as counterweights for use in maintaining the Potarch Bridge. Lost following World War I, they were rediscovered in 1953 by David P. Webster. Strongmen lift the stones off the ground (also known as putting the wind under the stones) and also carry them or hold them for time as measures to check strength in different ways. The ultimate challenge is to replicate the 1860 performance of Donald Dinnie, by walking the original stones (heavier stone to be gripped from the front and the lighter stone from the back) over the historical Potarch Bridge distance of 17 ft 1 1/2 in (5.22 m). Another contemporary feat of strength is to pick up the stones from the sides and walk them in a farmers walk style carry. Lifting and holding the stones up unassisted without the use of lifting straps is widely regarded as a world class feat of grip strength.

There's also 'Nicol Stones' which are meant to be a stepping stone towards the Dinnies, weighing 138 kg (304 lb) and 114 kg (251 lb) for a combined 252 kg (556 lb).

==== Inver Stone ====
A 118 kg (260 lb) (originally weighed 120 kg (265 lb)) granite stone, naturally made into an oval shape due to fast flowing waters of River Dee. Dating back to the 18th century, it was used to measure corn and wheat and sat outside of Inver Cottage from the early 20th century until 2021 where it was relocated to the Braemar Highland Games Centre. The American Bill Kazmaier was the first man to successfully overhead press the stone.

A five stone set replica of the historical stone, ranging from 125–190.5 kg (276–420 lb) was often featured at the Rogue Invitational. Athletes had to load them over a hitching post in 2021 and 2022, and onto the top of whiskey barrels in 2024. Overhead pressing the first two stones of this set has also been featured at the Arnold Strongman Classic.
Only 10 men (Jerry Pritchett, Hafþór Júlíus Björnsson, Mateusz Kieliszkowski, Rob Kearney, Bobby Thompson, Martins Licis, JF Caron, Oleksii Novikov, Tom Stoltman and Mitchell Hooper) have overhead pressed the 136 kg (300 lb) second stone of this set.

==== McGlashen Stones/Atlas Stones ====
Inspired by the original Inver Stone, these smooth and perfectly spherical stones were carved out from granite by stone-mason Stewart McGlashan during the nineteenth century. The earliest account of them being used in a strength competition was in 1963 at Highland Games. The Stones of Strength event introduced first at 1986 World's Strongest Man and then 1987 Pure Strength is the beginning of the benchmark in modern day Strongman stone runs where the competitors had to lift five concrete stones of increasing weight, lap them in a squatting position and hoist them to the top of wooden barrels, one by one. In the initial competitions of the 1980s and 1990s, these barrels (now podiums), were of varying height, with the lightest stone requiring to be lifted approximately to a person's head height. The heavier the stone was, the closer it was located to the podium. From 1998 onwards, the stones increased in weight (now called 'Atlas stones'), and the podium heights and height ratios were gradually reduced. From the mid 2000s, podium heights and distance from the stone was kept uniform for better standardization.

Two of the most iconic Atlas stone runs today are the 5 Atlas Stones heavy set 120–200 kg (265–441 lb) and light set 100–180 kg (220–397 lb), which the world records are held by Hafþór Júlíus Björnsson (heavy set) and Tom Stoltman (light set) respectively. Iñaki Perurena shouldered a 211 kg (465 lb) Atlas stone and Magnus Samuelsson overhead pressed a 140 kg (309 lb) Atlas stone.

==== Fianna Stone ====
Located in Glenlyon, Perthshire, it is the oldest of the Scottish stones and the challenge of 'Bodach', both dating back to the 11th century. Originated from Dolerite which is rich in Iron, the stone's volume is considerably less for a stone which weighs 127 kg (280 lb), owing to its high density. For Bodach, it has to be lifted and placed on a flat plinth.

==== Barevan Stone ====
Situated next to a stone coffin, historians think the stone was placed on top of the coffin when criminals were buried alive. The stone weighs 105 kg (231 lb) and is used for either carrying or shouldering.

==== Menzies Stone ====
Also known as Chieftains stone, this 114.5 kg (252 lb) smooth round stone at Castle Menzies was expected to be lifted and carried for 10 paces (7.5 meters) to achieve manhood. It was originally used as the boundary marker for the bog at the Rannoch Moor.

==== Saddlin’ Mare ====
At Sma Glen is a plinth and a stone along-with a challenge named after the practice of putting a saddle on a horse. The plinth known as 'Mare' is a tall and wide druid-like boulder, shaped at the top like a sloping desk with a 30° angle. The stone known as 'Saddle' which weighs 99 kg (218 lb) should be picked up and placed on top of the plinth so that it sits balanced on top.

==== Ardblair Stones ====
The Ardblair Stones were recently developed series of nine concrete spheres ranging from 18 kg (40 lb) to 152 kg (335 lb) used in the Blairgowrie & Rattray Highland Games. With very light first five of the nine stones.

==== Others ====
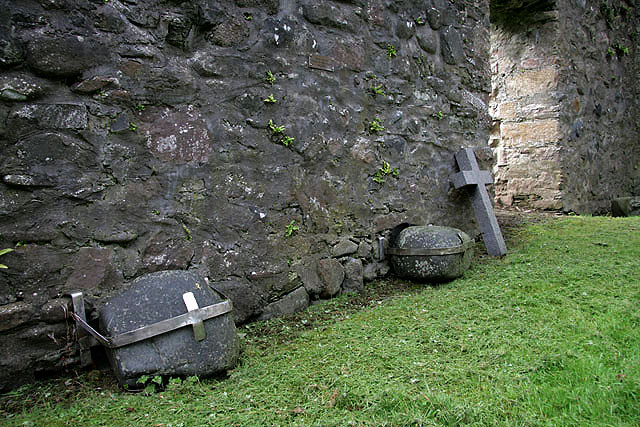
The 'Blue or Charter Stones' of Old Dailly.

- Blue or Charter stones at cemetery of old Dailly church 131 kg (289 lb) & 118 kg (260 lb)
- Wallace Stone - 125 kg (276 lb)
- Puterach and Pudrac stones
- Clach-ultaich of Iain Garbh MacGille Chaluim in Raasay, Duntulm
- MacLeod's lifting stone in Rona
- Farm stone of Auldgirth
- Kidney shaped black basalt Leper's stone at Prestwick
- Monachyle stone - 120 kg (265 lb)
- Ardvorlich stone - 152 kg (335 lb)

== Ireland ==
In Ireland, lifting stones have been used for centuries as a test for strength, as rites of passage into manhood, as well as at funeral gatherings. A man who could put the wind under a lifting-stone was considered a local hero and given great respect for his strength. Specialised throwing stones were also used in Irish warfare with great effect through the medieval period, and stone is a common material in construction of buildings, property boundaries and memorials for the dead. Currently, stone-lifting in Ireland is experiencing a modern revival, as known historic stones are receiving more attention.

=== Irish lifting stones ===
==== Aran Island Stones ====
Stone abounds are common in Aran Islands where it remains the primary traditional building material. One such famous lifting stone is a 171 kg (377 lb) pink granite, called the Inishmore Stone, on Inishmore. It is also called Moulin Port Bheal an Dun by the locals. Liam O'Flaherty wrote about this stone in 'The Stone', 1937. Adjacent to it are two other smaller stones beside the main stone on the same patch of grass. Another stone located in Inishmaan is called Inishmaan Graveyard Stone which weighs 153 kg (337 lb). The test was to lift the stone to the graveyard wall. Another stone and a test is known as "Stonemason's Test" at 125 kg (276 lb) where the stone had to be loaded on to a dry limestone wall as a test to become a stonemason's apprentice.

==== Faha Graveyard Stones ====
The Faha Stones in Faha, County Clare, are a pair, which the heavier one Cloch na bhFear weighs 162 kg (357 lb) and the lighter one Cloch na mBean weighs 112 kg (247 lb). These stones were lifted at burial games and ceremonies to honor the deceased and there are written records of them that date back hundreds of years.

==== The Flag of Denn ====
The 215 kg (474 lb) Flag of Denn in Denn, County Cavan is a heavy, almost perfectly rectangular stone associated with strong men of the parish who challenged each other after Sunday Masses to lift the stone up to their knees. Legend says a man called Michael Clarke, hoisted it onto his back over a century ago, walked 150 ft to the local pub, downed a glass of whiskey with the stone still on his back, and walked right back to the graveyard. Old accounts report there were originally three stones, called "The Flags of Denn". Under those three flags were supposed to lie the remains of three saints, and at that time this place was recognised as the saints burying ground.

==== Aughrim Graveyard Stone ====
Another ancient Irish stone is the Aughrim Graveyard Stone (outside Elphin, Co. Roscommon) which weighs 115 kg (254 lb) and meant to be shouldered when lifted.

==== The Bulk ====
Another contemporary stone is the 125 kg (276 lb) Bulk in Owning, Co. Kilkenny, which rests near a lone tree at the crossroads, surrounded by a low stone wall. The goal is to lift the stone and carry around the tree as many times as possible.

== Faroe Islands ==
Every settlement in the Faroe Islands used to have its local lifting stone, called 'Hav', derived from the verb hevja which means 'to lift'. Visiting men would be challenged by the locals to show off their strength. These stones usually are very heavy and elongated in shape and they are mainly to be lifted off the ground to send wind underneath them.

One such iconic stone is now a part of a mural in the village of Mikladalur known as Marjunar Hav of Kalsoy. The legend says the 270 kg (595 lb) stone has been lifted by Marjun the milkmaid, in the 16th century. Another famous Hav is the 198.5 kg (438 lb) Anfinn’s Hav in Eysturoy.

The 180 kg (397 lb) Faroe-kviahellan, modeled after the Húsafell Stone of Iceland, which was featured at 2000 IFSA Atlantic Giant competition in Tórshavn, was a perfectly triangular stone which had to be carried in a U-shaped path in the fastest time. Sweden's Magnus Samuelsson finished the course in 16.88 seconds.

== Wales ==
According to Y pedair Camp ar Hugain Welsh for "The 24 feats", stone lifting was a common practice. It was usually performed by young boys as a rite of passage into manhood. It is said that once a young boy could lift the stone to his waist he was considered a man. Furthermore, the stone was used to develop a man's strength in preparation for battle. Stones varied, depending on what was available within the locality or on what was selected by the king of each region. The king's teulu ("personal army", or "household") were selected from each village or town within his borders, based upon a man's ability to lift stones, run, jump, leap, wrestle, fence, shoot a bow and arrow and throw a spear.

To date, a 136 kg (300 lb) lifting stone called Garreg Orchest (also known as 'Ysbyty Ifan Stone)' is still in place in the town of Criccieth in Gwynedd, North Wales. Competitors travel from all across the UK to attempt to lift and carry this large stone. In 2012 David Horne walked it for 62 feet (18.9m). The other most famous lifting stone of Wales is the 177.5 kg (391 lb) egg-shaped Criccieth Stone which is recognizable thanks to its broken chunk.

== Basque Country ==
Stone lifting is also a traditional Basque Country sport involving the lifting of stones, called harri jasotzea. Basque country is located in the western Pyrenees, straddling the border between France and Spain on the coast of the Bay of Biscay.

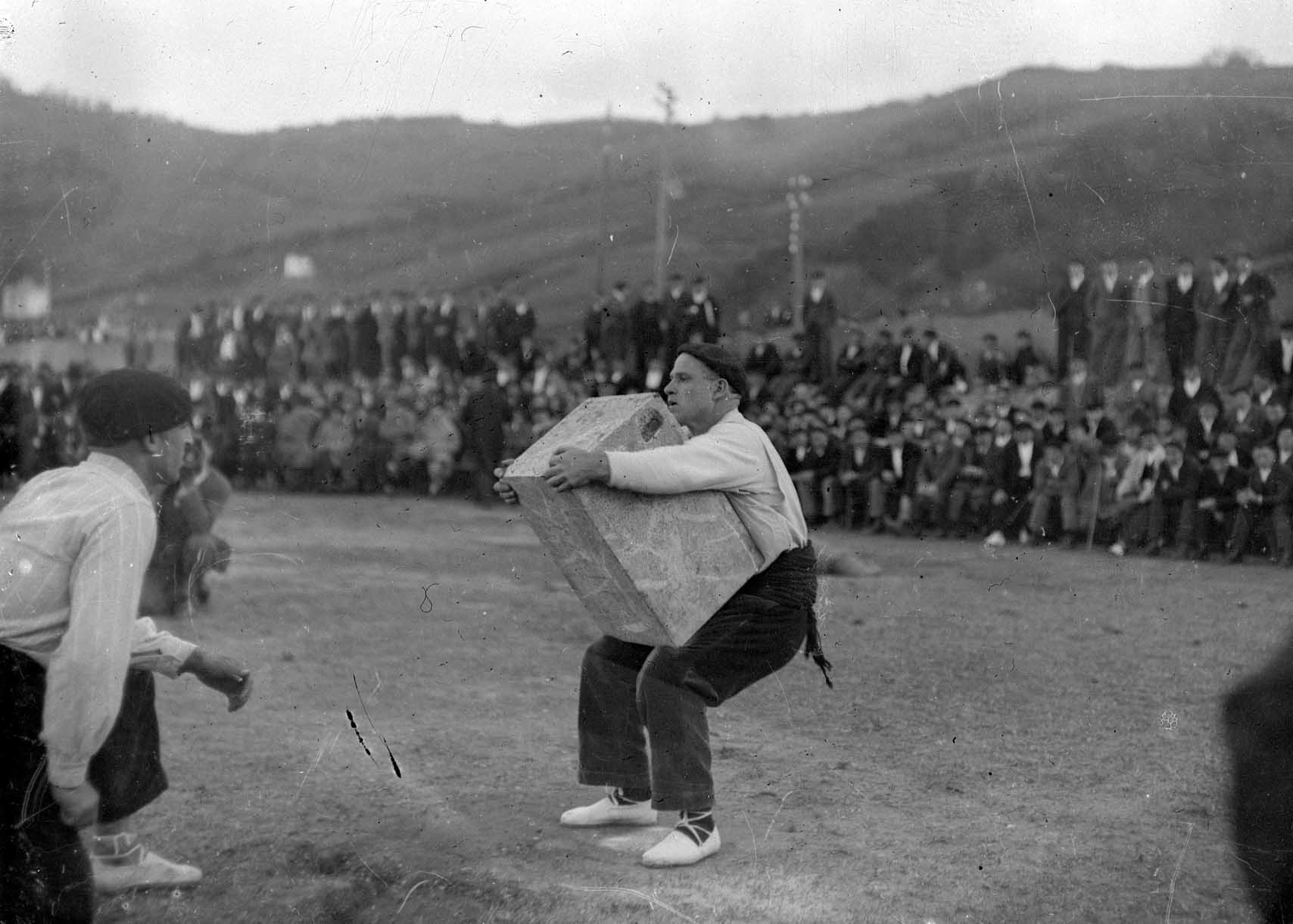
Arteondo lifting the Laukizuzena

There are several traditional Basque stones, pioneered by Bittor Zabala (Arteondo), namely Kuboa, Laukizuzena, Zilindroa and Biribila. They are specially carved out stones with specific shapes to each of them. The most common prowess is shouldering them. Contestants participate across events where they lap and shoulder them for as many reps as possible or for a one rep max. Also unique to Basque stone lifting is the donning of heavily padded leather vests and pants which protect contestants from scrapes or bruises.

- Kuboa (cubic stones) – usually weighing between 10 and 17 arroba
- Laukizuzena (rectangular stones) – usually weighing between 10 and 17 arroba
- Zilindroa (cylindrical stones) – usually weighing between 8 and 10 arroba
- Biribila (spherical stones) – usually weighing between 8 and 10 arroba

Mieltxo Saralegi holds the world record for the heaviest laukizuzena shoulder lift at 329 kg (725 lb). The greatest Basque stonelifter Iñaki Perurena previously held the record and was the first man to lift a 300 kg (661 lb) laukizuzena in 1987, which he gradually increased it to 322 kg (710 lb) by 1994. Additionally, Perurena holds the world records in 'one-arm' laukizuzena at 267 kg (589 lb) for max, 250 kg (551 lb) for 3 reps, and 200 kg (441 lb) for 4 reps.

In Amezketa, there is a stone challenge called Albitzuri Haundi where a 166 kg (366 lb) rectangularly spherical stone needs to be shouldered for the most number of times within 10 minutes.

Giza proba (stone dragging) is another discipline where a very heavy rectangular stone is attached to a chain to be attached to the athlete around his waist or just to be gripped by a handle and the stone to be dragged for the furthermost distance.

In the Ontzi eramatea event, the weights were originally milk canisters prior to stones.

== Cumbria ==
In North West England centred around Cumbria, are several historical stone circles such as Castlerigg, Swinside and Birkrigg. Some stones, mainly the smallest and liftable ones among them have been used during ancient English sporting events which dates back to the 1600s. There are also several single stones which have become renowned among stonelifting communities.

=== Cumbrian lifting stones ===
==== Teesdale Feat Stone ====
In Durham, a whinstone fetched from the River Tees named the Teesdale Feat Stone, which weighs 135 kg (298 lb), poses a popular challenge which requires the lifter to lift it onto a wooden table. The stone was lost for 12 years until it was found again in 2024 and is now located in a field just off the Pennine Way footpath.

==== Lonton Egg ====
Another famous stone in Durham is the 130 kg (287 lb) Lonton Egg which has a distinctive indent on one side. According to a lifting stone enthusiast named Ewan (the person who discovered the Teesdale Feat Stone), young men used to lift the Lonton Egg on the way home from a nearby pub in the early 20th century. It has no real handholds (the indent is too shallow) so it poses a unique challenge among stones of its weight. It also is one of the earlier lifting stones in England used specifically for challenges.

==== Northumberland Stone ====
The 245 kg (540 lb) Northumberland Stone, named by David P. Webster which was featured at 2015 World's Strongest Team competition was a cheviot granite from Martindale parish, Cumbria. It is the heaviest stone ever used in a distance carrying event and Iceland's Hafþór Júlíus Björnsson carried the colossal stone for 46.52 metres (152 ft 7 in).

== Scandinavia ==
In Sweden, three of the most historical stones are Orebro stones, Kungslena stones and Ormeshaga stone. The Orebro Stones are seven stones located in three recessed circles that are cut into the grass, situated about 160 km West of Stockholm. The heaviest stone weighs 176 kg (388 lb). Kungslena Stones are three stones with the heaviest one weighing 166 kg (366 lb) which reside outside the Kungslena church, situated about 125 km North East of Gothenburg. They are to be lifted and placed on top of three wooden stumps. Ormeshaga Stone lies under a tree by the roadside parallel to Lake Rottnen. It weighs 118 kg (260 lb).

In Finland, there's popular stone named "Karperö Lifting Stone" whose formation dates back to the Ice age. In 1986, Finnish author Bernhard Fransholm wrote about the 117 kg (258 lb) near perfectly spherical stone, and how it was used as a measure of men's strength and arm girth.

In Denmark, located at the Open Air Museum of Copenhagen there's a historical stone named "Mules Old Lifting Stone" which weighs 180.5 kg (398 lb). It is meant to be lifted and held above ground for the longest time.

== Switzerland ==
In Switzerland, affiliated to the Unspunnenfest, a festival held once every twelve years, a historic stone weighing 83.5 kg (184 lb) is thrown overhead for the longest distance. The event is known as Unspunnen stone throw. The contestants begin on a 6.1 metres (20 ft 0 in) runway, hurling the Aare granite stone as far as they could into a 4-inch-deep (100 mm) sand pit. In 2004, Swiss carpenter Markus Maire established the current record in this event with a 4.11 metres (13 ft 6 in) throw.

== Bavaria ==
In Southern Germany centered around Bavaria, stone lifting has been a traditional sport for centuries. It was developed as a general test of strength primarily in the Bavarian Alps region, and under the care of the State Association of Stone Lifters, now developed as an independent sport. A notable event is the Stoalupfn (Bavarian stone lift) which originated at the strong beer festival, where competitors have to lift a rectangular shaped stone attached to a ring, starting from a squatting position. In 2014, Germany's Andreas Altmann lifted a 375 kg (827 lb) stone to a height of 68.8 cm.

In Munich Residenz lies a black lifting stone called Duke Christoph’s Stone which weighs 138 kg (304 lb), dating back to the seventeenth century.

== Greece ==
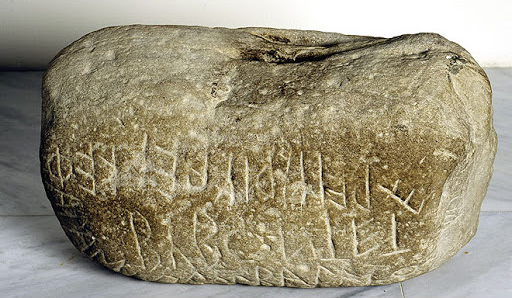
Bybon stone

Stonelifting in Ancient Greece runs back to the early 6th century BC with the legend of the Bybon stone of Olympia. It is a red sandstone weighing 143.5 kg (316 lb) which also contains two deep notches carved out of it, forming a handle so that the stone might have been used as a free weight. The inscription on the stone which reads: 'ΒΥΒΟΝ ΤΕΤΕΡΕΙ ΧΕΡΙ (sic) ΥΠΕΡ ΚΕΦΑΛΑΣ ΥΠΕΡΕΒΑΛΕΤΟ ΟΦΟΛΑ' translates to "Bybon, son of Phola, has lifted me over (his) head with one hand". The stone is preserved and displayed at the Archaeological Museum of Olympia.

== United States of America ==
Events involving carrying, walking, shouldering, loading, holding and throwing stones have become very popular in the US across many American highland games competitions. Organizations such as 'New England Stone Lifting' also arrange competitions like 'Festival at Fort 4' to popularize stone lifting among the general public. Below are some of the most iconic stones.

=== American lifting stones ===
==== Lundstrom Stones ====
At the Loon Mountain Highland Games in New Hampshire, there's a popular farmers walk event with a pair of stones which weigh 124.5 kg (274 lb) and 106 kg (234 lb) respectively for a combined weight of 230.5 kg (508 lb). It was originated in 1983 and pioneered by stone-lifter John Lundstrom. In 2015, Iceland's Hafþór Júlíus Björnsson competed against the Highland games specialists and carried the stones for 42.93 metres (140 ft 10 in).

==== Jón Páll Sigmarsson Stone ====
A bulky, sharp and triangularly shaped stone weighing 221 kg (487 lb) named after Jón Páll Sigmarsson which is kept in New Hampshire, and used in some New England Highland Games. Like the Húsafell Stone, it is to be lifted onto the chest and carried for maximum distance. The Icelandic phrase 'Þetta er ekkert mál fyrir Jón Páll!' is inscribed in the stone.

==== Odd Haugen's Tombstone ====
Norwegian Strongman Odd Haugen was gifted with a 186 kg (410 lb) oval shaped stone on his 58th birthday and since has featured at the Arnold Strongman Classic a number of times in the Stone to Shoulder event. In 2019, Poland's Mateusz Kieliszkowski performed 5 repetitions. Only 13 men in history (Jesse Marunde, Martins Licis, Mateusz Kieliszkowski, Mikhail Shivlyakov, Hafþór Júlíus Björnsson, Matjaz Belsak, Bobby Thompson, Oleksii Novikov, Bryce Johnson, Thomas Evans, Trey Mitchell, Austin Andrade and Mitchell Hooper) have lifted this stone to their shoulder.

==== Manhood Stones ====
In 2007, when Slater Strength Co. introduced the 237 kg (522 lb) Max. Atlas stone over 4ft bar event for the Arnold Strongman Classic in Columbus, Ohio, it went on to be popularized as the Manhood Stones. Throughout the years, stones got heavier and was frequently featured at Rogue Record Breakers. During 2024 Strongest Man on Earth in Colorado, Iceland's Hafþór Júlíus Björnsson broke the world record for the heaviest Manhood Stone ever lifted within a full competition by repping a 250 kg (551 lb) stone twice. Scotland's Tom Stoltman holds the world record for the heaviest Manhood Stone ever lifted at 286 kg (631 lb).

An Atlas stone heavier than 227 kg (500 lb) is called a Manhood stone. Only 27 men in history have ever loaded one over a 4ft bar within a full competition: Hafþór Júlíus Björnsson, Bryce Johnson, Austin Andrade, Mitchell Hooper, Trey Mitchell, Reza Gheitasi, Brian Shaw, Mikhail Koklyaev, Vytautas Lalas, Mike Jenkins, Travis Ortmayer, Mark Felix, Serhiy Romanchuk, Žydrūnas Savickas, Derek Poundstone, Phil Pfister, Oleksandr Pekanov, Steve MacDonald, Peiman Maheripour, László Fekete, Lucas Hatton, Tristain Hoath, Nick Guardione, Tom Stoltman, Thomas Evans, Eddie Williams and Wesley Derwinsky.

==== Others ====
- Buckeye stone (Ohio) 145 kg (320 lb)
- Calamity stone (Ohio) 158.5 kg (349 lb)
- Gilson stone (Ohio) 122.5 kg (270 lb)
- Cottonwood stones (small & big) (Utah) 127–131.5 kg (280–290 lb)
- Buffalo stone (Utah) 137 kg (302 lb)
- Hoosier stones (Indiana) 109–147.5 kg (240–325 lb)
- William Keith stone (Pennsylvania) 145 kg (320 lb)

== Canada ==
In 1883, Louis Cyr of Quebec was credited with lifting a 234.5 kg (517 lb) stone which was deemed impossible to lift. After performing the feat, the stone was said to have returned to its original location but it disappeared in 1903. During 2008 Fortissimus competition organized by Paul Ohl, Derek Poundstone lifted a replica of the stone which weighed 240.5 kg (530 lb) to a 30 in platform. The stone was named and engraved 'Cyr/ Poundstone' soon after.

== Asia ==
=== Japan ===
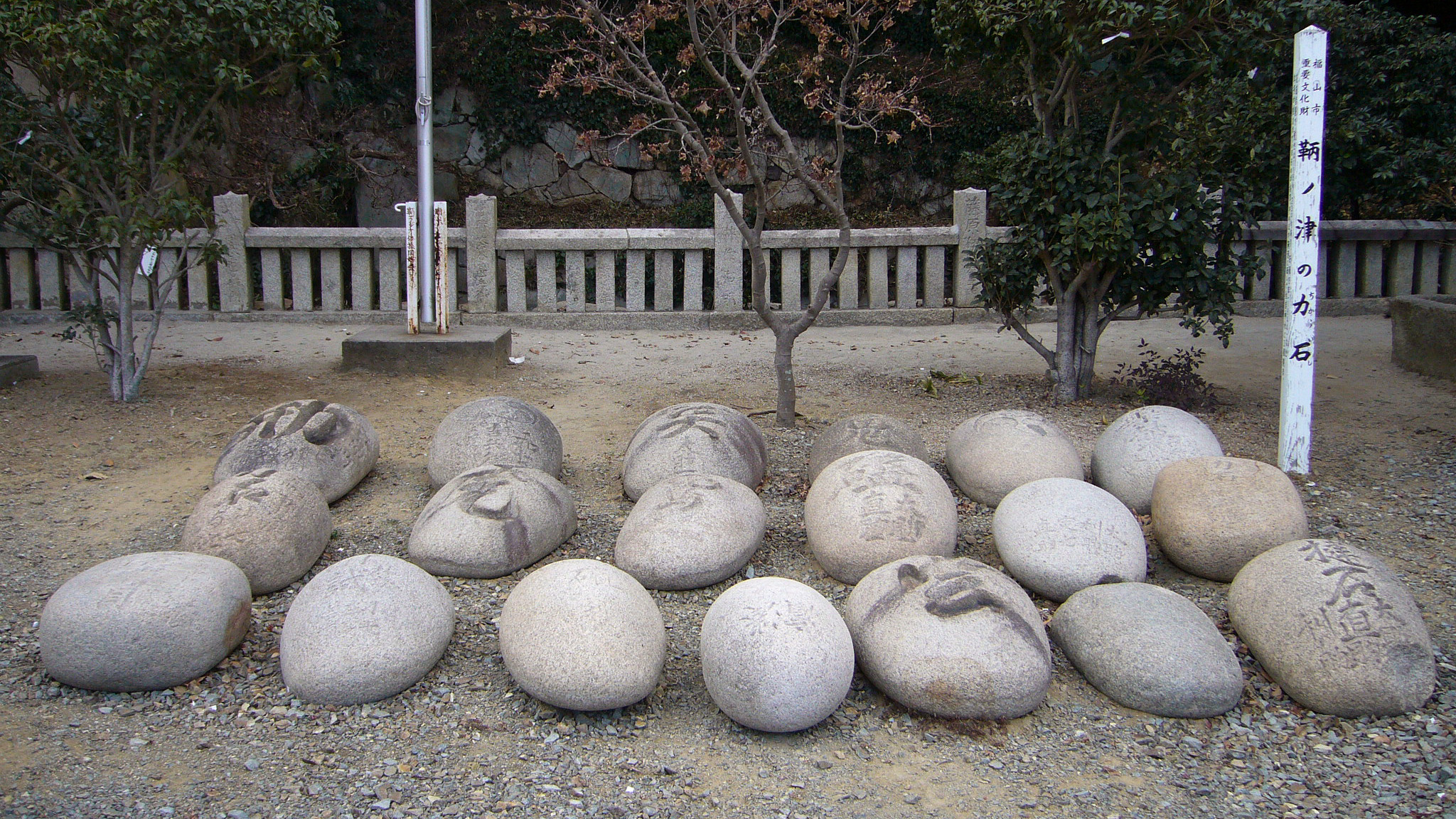
Lifting stones at Nunakuma Shrine in Fukuyama.

In ancient Japan, stone lifting was carried out around Shinto shrines as a sport. サシ石 (Hiragana: さしいし)(sashi-ishi) ("overhead pressing stone"), 石担, (ishikatsugi) ("shoulder carried stone") and 石運び (ishihakobi) ("stone carrying") are some popular disciplines.

In Takayama, there are two smooth circular stones called "Hida folk village stones" which weigh 94 kg (207 lb) and 75 kg (165 lb) respectively. Traditionally they were used to determine who is the strongest man in the village.

=== Other parts of Asia ===
In late antiquity, Jerome described a long-standing tradition in Judaea where heavy round stones were placed in towns and villages for young men to lift as a test of strength, with some raising them to their knees or shoulders and the strongest lifting them overhead with straight, bound arms.

Rock carrying is traditional in Tibet and the rest of China where circular shaped natural stones and rectangular shaped stones weighing up to 150 kg (331 lb) are lifted and carried. In India and Pakistan, rocks are lifted in different ways as a sport.

== Notable stone lifters ==
- Below table summarizes the 12 greatest stone lifters in Strongman history.
- No. of total career stone event wins (international competitions/ open category), including currently held world records (WRs).

#	Name	Wins (Events)	Win %	WRs	World records (in detail) Currently held world records only
1	(Iceland) Hafþór Júlíus Björnsson	29 (51)	56.86%	20	Húsafell Stone (linear) WR, Jón Páll Sigmarsson Stone WR, Northumberland Stone WR, Lundstrom Stones WR, Alfastein WR, 5 Inver Stones on to barrel (125–191kg) WR, Manhood Stone for reps (250kg) WR, 6 Atlas Stones (100–200kg) WR, 5 Atlas Stones (130–186kg), (130–190kg), (120–200kg), (140–200kg), (160–200kg) WRs, Atlas Stone over bar (160 & 200kg) WRs, Atlas Stone to Shoulder (142kg) WR, Ross boulder press WR, Natural Stones (120–190kg), (137–170kg), (137–212kg) WRs
2	(United States) Brian Shaw	25 (59)	42.37%	8	Manhood Stone for reps (243 & 244kg) WRs, 5 Atlas Stones (120–180kg), (130–180kg), (140–195kg), (170–225kg) WRs, 6 Atlas Stones (120–180kg), (132–204kg) WRs
3	(Lithuania) Žydrūnas Savickas	21 (93)	22.58%	2	5 Atlas Stones (140–180kg) WR, Natural Stones (102–159kg) WR
4	(Sweden) Magnus Samuelsson	18 (43)	41.86%	4	5 Atlas Stones (100–160kg) WR, Replica Húsafell Stone (93 & 87.5%) WRs, Faroe-kviahellan WR
5	(Scotland) Tom Stoltman	17 (35)	48.57%	6	Manhood Stone (Max Atlas Stone) WR, 10 Atlas Stones (100–200kg) WR, 5 Atlas Stones (100–180kg), (115–175kg), (150–210kg) WRs, Ardblair Stones WR
6	(Poland) Mariusz Pudzianowski	17 (53)	32.07%	3	5 Atlas Stones (115–155kg) WR, Africa Stone WR, Asia Stone WR
7	(Latvia) Aivars Šmaukstelis	15 (36)	41.66%	1	5 Atlas Stones (110–180kg) WR
8	(Poland) Mateusz Kieliszkowski	15 (38)	39.47%	5	Odd Haugen Tombstone to Shoulder WR, Atlas Stone to Shoulder (170kg) WR, Stone press WR, Replica Steinstossen (84kg) WR, Natural Stones (105–170kg) WR
9	(United States) Travis Ortmayer	13 (32)	40.63%	3	5 Atlas Stones (120–160), (120–170), (125–215kg) WRs
10	(England) Mark Felix	11 (67)	16.41%	0	
11	(United States) Martins Licis	10 (26)	38.46%	2	5 Inver Stones: hitching post (125–191kg) WR, Atlas Stone to Shoulder (170kg) WR
12	(Estonia) Rauno Heinla	10 (41)	24.39%	3	5 Atlas Stones (160–220kg) WR, 6 Atlas Stones (120–215kg) WR; Atlas Stone over bar (185kg) WR

- As at 17 August 2025

== See also ==
- Strongman
- History of physical training and fitness
- Stone put
