= Seiban Kyūryō Prefectural Natural Park =

Natural park of Hyogo prefecture, Japan

- 西播丘陵県立自然公園
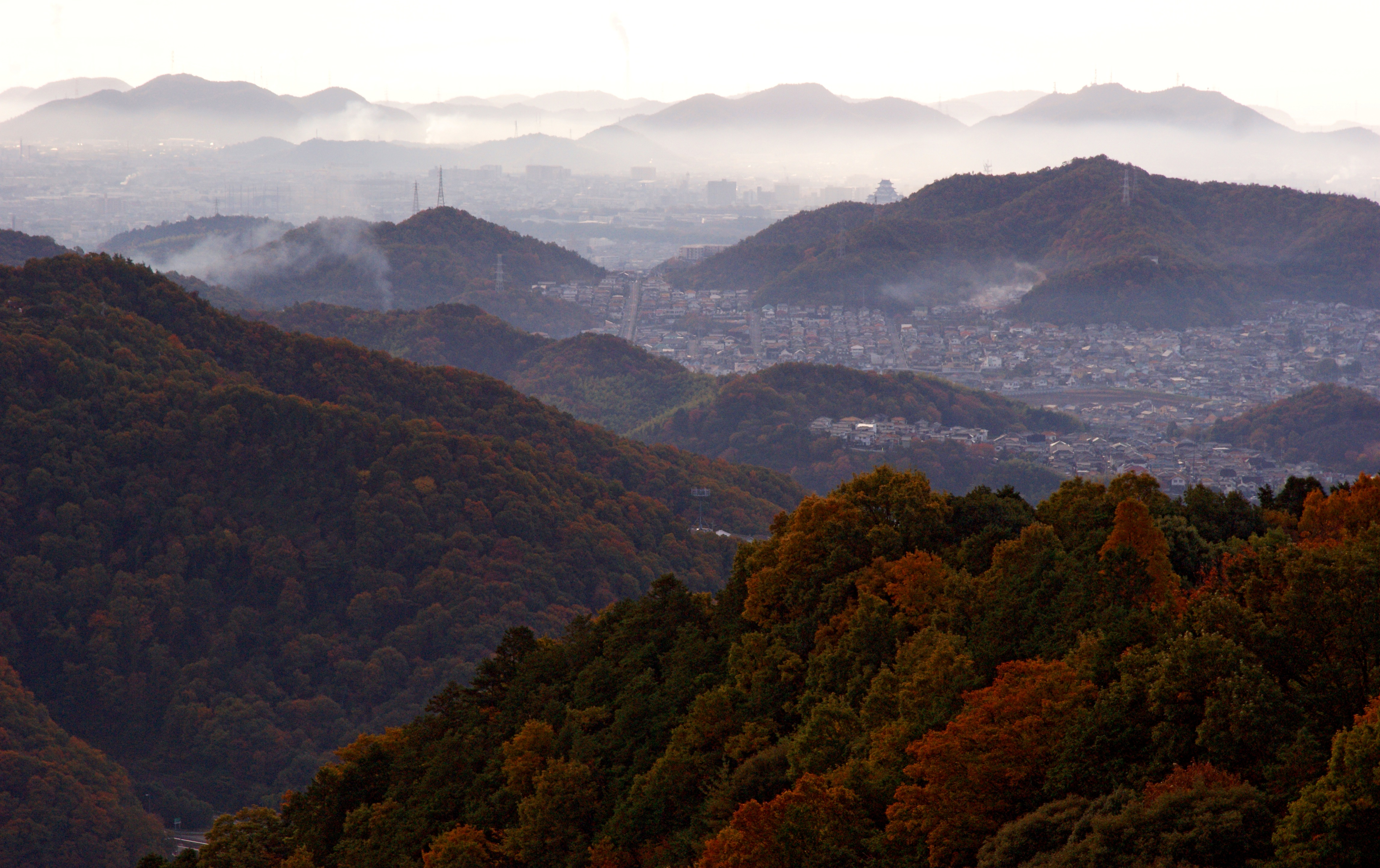
- Himeji viewed from Mount Shosha
- Interactive map of Seiban Kyūryō Prefectural Natural Park
- Location: Hyōgo Prefecture, Japan
- Area: 64.33 km^{2} (24.84 sq mi)
- Established: 21 July 1959

Seiban Kyūryō Prefectural Natural Park (西播丘陵県立自然公園, Seiban Kyūryō kenritsu shizen kōen) is a Prefectural Natural Park in southwest Hyōgo Prefecture, Japan. Established in 1959, the park spans the municipalities of Aioi, Himeji, and Tatsuno. Sites of interest include Mounts Shosha, Hiromine, Masui (増位山), Minō (三濃山), Kame, and Higashiyama; temples Zuigan-ji (随願寺) and Engyō-ji; and Hiromine Jinja (広峯神社).

== See also ==
- National Parks of Japan
