= Djúpalónssandur =

Bay in Iceland

Djúpalónssandur is a black sand and pebble beach located on the southern coast of the Snæfellsnes Peninsula in western Iceland. It lies within the boundaries of Snæfellsjökull National Park, near the base of the Snæfellsjökull glacier and volcano. Djúpalónssandur is known for its dramatic coastal scenery, unique lava formations, and cultural heritage dating back to Iceland’s early fishing communities.

== Geography ==
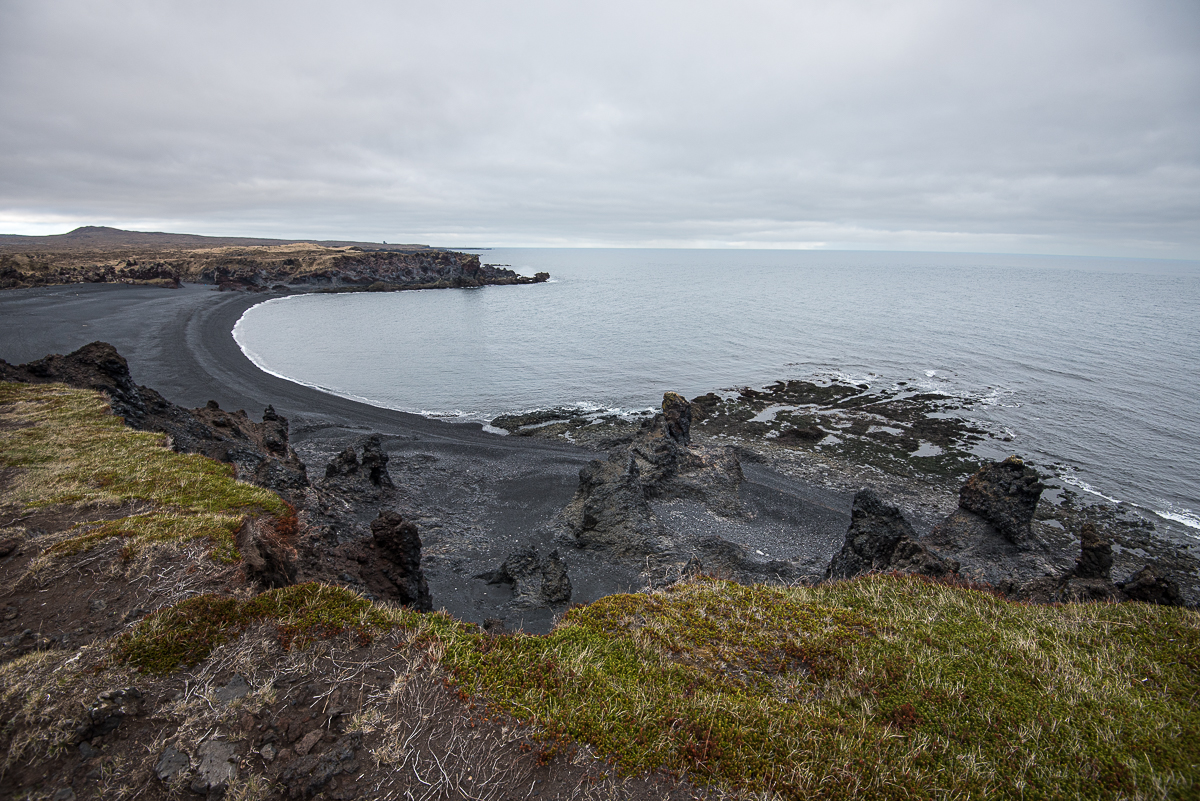

Djúpalónssandur is situated approximately 200 kilometers northwest of Reykjavík, accessible via the main road through the Snæfellsnes Peninsula (Route 574). The beach is framed by jagged lava fields formed by ancient volcanic activity, particularly from Snæfellsjökull. The area is characterized by steep cliffs, sea stacks, and rough Atlantic surf.

== Geological Features ==
The beach is composed primarily of smooth black volcanic pebbles known locally as "Djúpulónsperlur" or "Pearls of Djúpalón." These pebbles have been polished over centuries by ocean tides and volcanic processes. Visitors are requested not to remove them, in order to preserve the beach’s natural state.

The lava field leading to the beach, called "Dritvík lava field" (Dritvíkurhraun), features several natural rock formations, including some with names and folklore associations, such as the "Gatklettur" (hole rock), a lava arch near the shoreline.

== History ==
Djúpalónssandur was once the site of a thriving fishing village, particularly in the 18th and 19th centuries. The nearby cove of Dritvík, just west of Djúpalónssandur, served as one of Iceland’s busiest fishing stations during peak seasons. At its height, up to 60 boats operated from the area.

Today, remnants of the village and old fishing equipment can still be found. One notable site is the remains of the British trawler "Epine GY7," which ran aground in 1948. The rusty metal fragments are still scattered across the beach and preserved as a historical monument.

== Lifting Stones ==
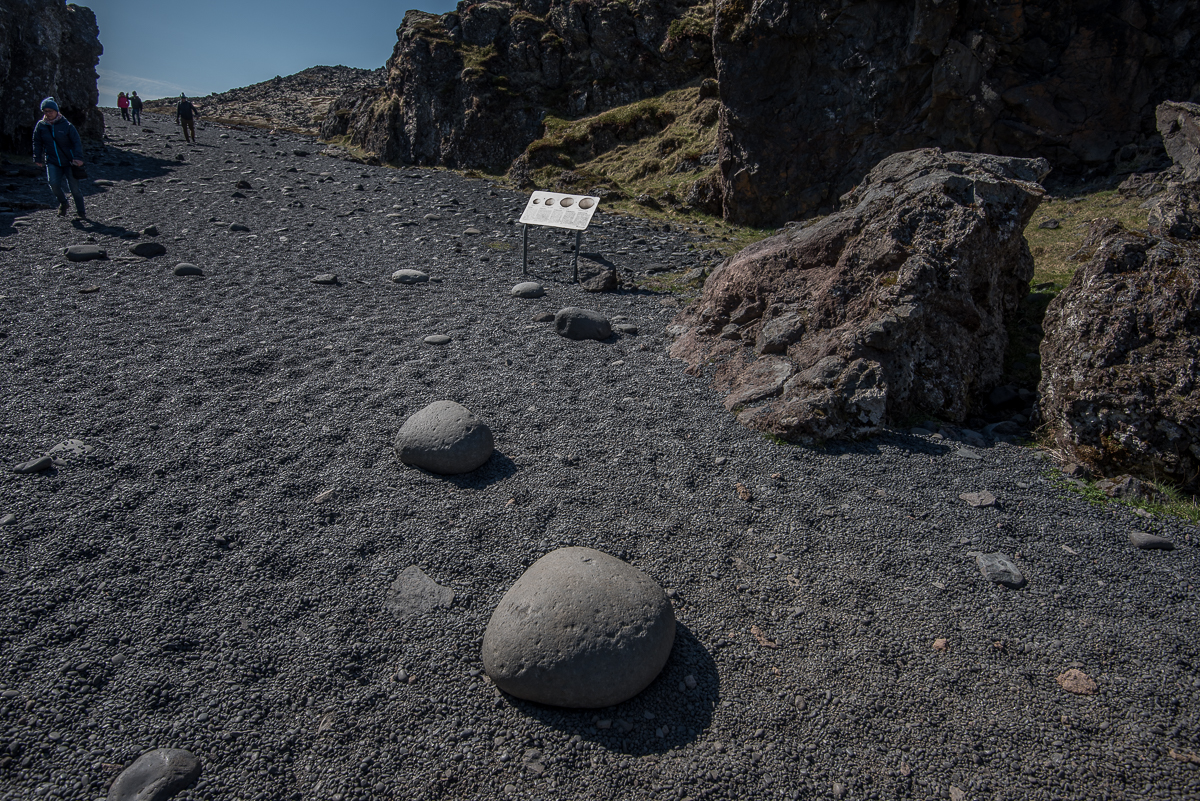
Djupalónssandur lifting stones

Near the beach, four traditional "lifting stones" (Steinatök) remain—a legacy from the fishing era when physical strength was crucial. The stones range in weight from 23 kg (Amlóði – Weakling) to 154 kg (Fullsterkur – Fully Strong). Prospective fishermen had to lift at least the third-heaviest stone to qualify for work.

== Tourism ==
Djúpalónssandur is a popular tourist destination and part of the Snæfellsjökull National Park, which emphasizes conservation and education. The area features walking trails, informational signs, and viewpoints. Swimming is prohibited due to the dangerous currents and waves. Visitors are encouraged to tread carefully to avoid damaging sensitive volcanic terrain.

The beach’s otherworldly landscape has also made it a filming location, contributing to its mystique and appeal.

== See also ==
- Snæfellsjökull National Park
- Snæfellsnes Peninsula
- Geography of Iceland
- Icelandic folklore
