= Iñaki Perurena =

Basque strongman

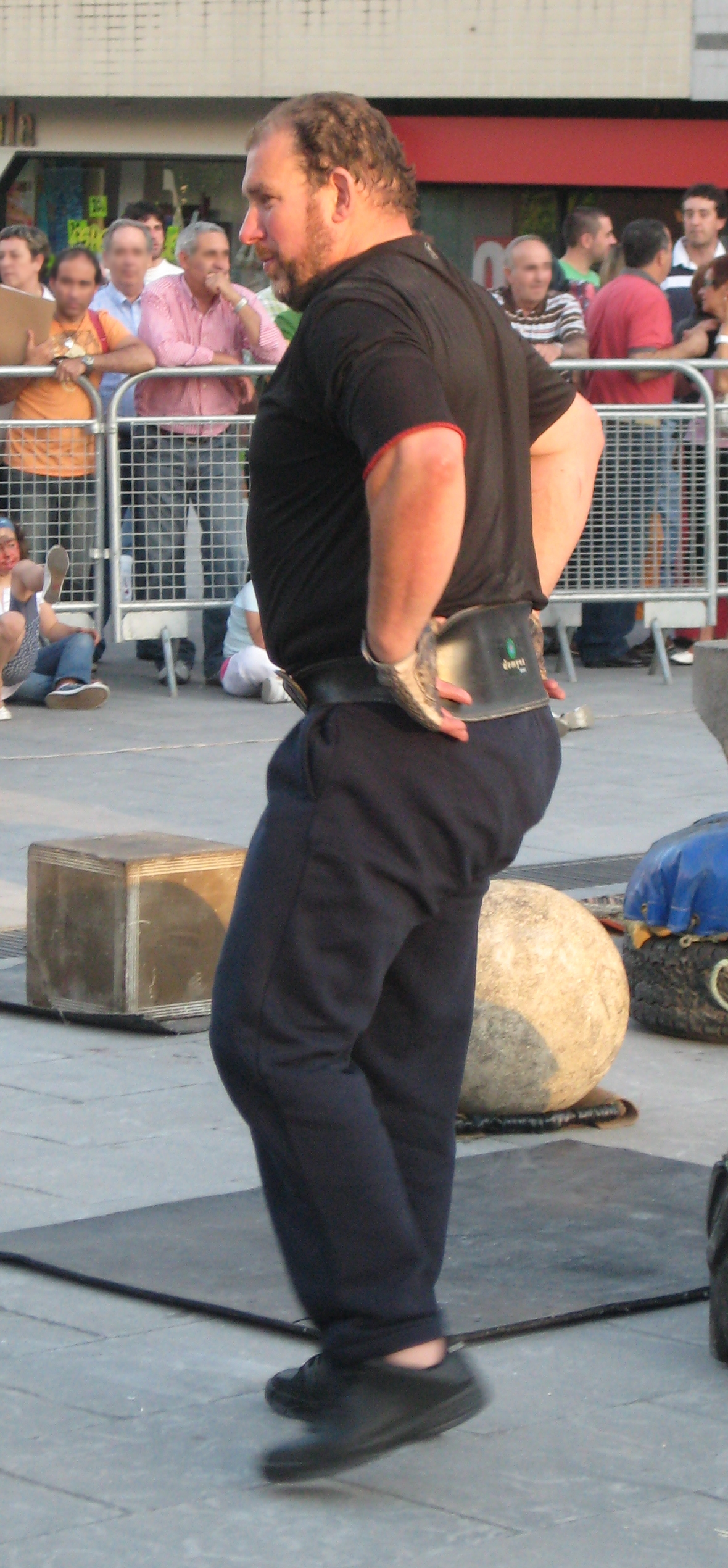
- Born: October 27, 1956 (age 69); Leitza, Navarre, Spain
- Occupations: Stone-lifter, Poet, Bertsolari
- Known for: Basque stone-lifting
- Height: 182 cm (5 ft 11.5 in)

Iñaki Perurena Gartziarena (born 25 October 1956) is a Basque Strongman who specializes in Harri-jasotzaileak (traditional Basque stone-lifting), and also a poet and a bertsolari.

== Career and achievements ==
Perurena made his debut as a stone lifter in 1973 Guipúzcoa championships. Within the next few years he improved drastically and became the first stone lifter in the country to successfully lift a 300 kg (661 lb) laukizuzena (rectangular stone) at the 1987 Antonio Elorza Velodrome, Donostia. He kept on breaking the record until 1994 where he raised the mark to 322 kg (710 lb). In 1999, he established another record by lifting a 100 kg (220 lb) stone 1,000 times continuously in 5 hours, and four years later, extended it to 1,700 consecutive lifts in 9 hours.

Perurena also holds one arm laukizuzena records of 267 kg (589 lb) for maximum weight, 250 kg (551 lb) for three reps and 200 kg (441 lb) for four reps. Apart from the standard Basque stones, he also holds records in irregular stones such as the 170 kg (375 lb) Albizuri Aundi which he lifted 13 times in 10 minutes, and the Boro Harria, both of which has eluded many modern athletes due to the odd shape and challenges to grip the two stones. He also holds the world record for the heaviest Atlas stone ever to be shouldered at 211 kg (465 lb).

In recognition of his stone-lifting achievements, Perurena was awarded the 2010 Navarra Gold Medal for Sports, and due to his prowess with both ancient and modern stones, Perurena is considered the greatest Basque stonelifter in history.

== Personal life ==
Perurena is married to Maite Zubitur, and they have three children.
