= Engyō-ji =

Buddhist temple in Himeji, Hyōgo, Japan

- 圓教寺
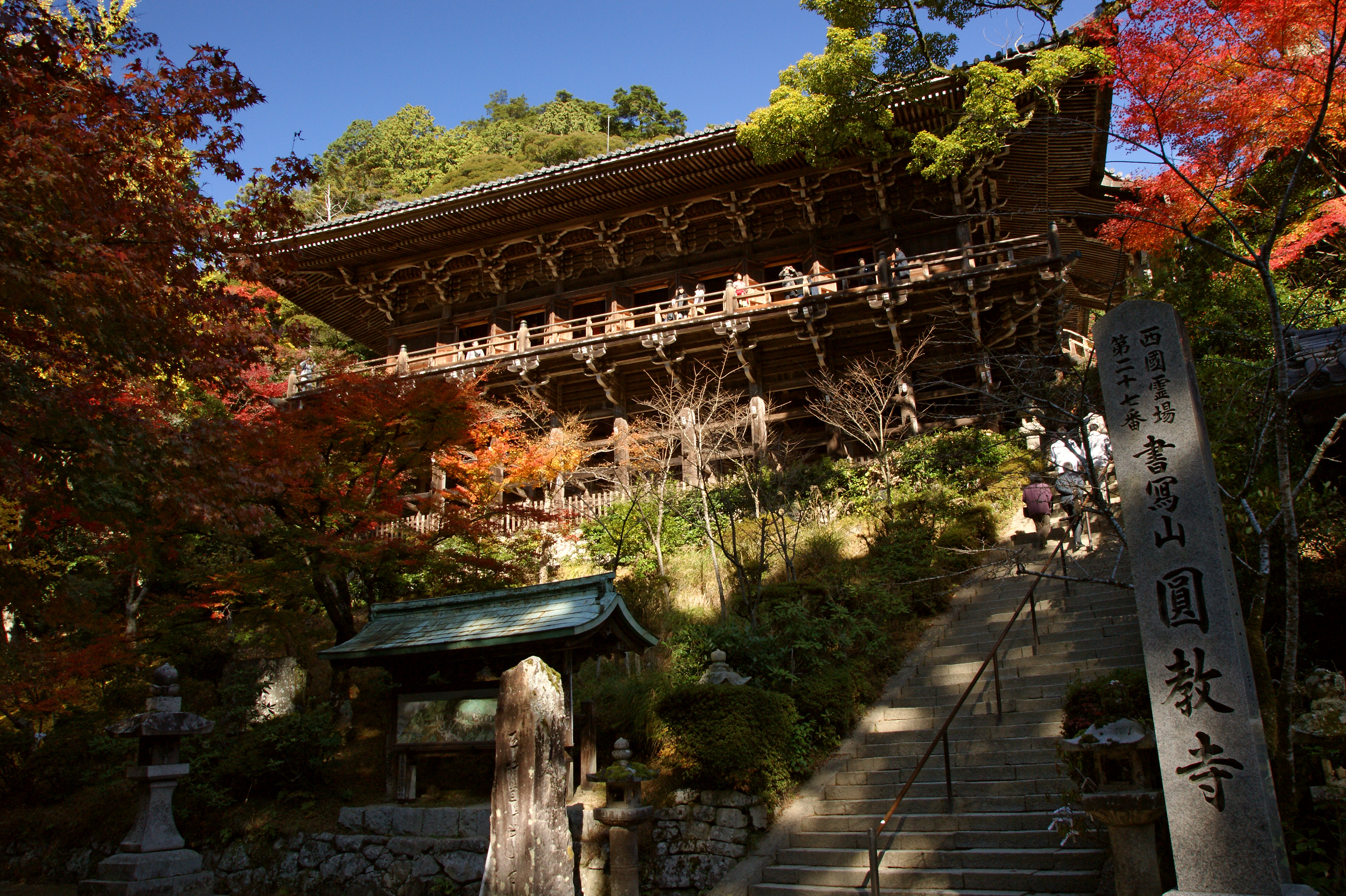
- Maniden

- Location within Hyōgo Prefecture Location within Japan

Religion
- Affiliation: Buddhist
- Deity: Shaka Sanzon
- Rite: Tendai
- Status: functional

Location
- Location: 2968 Shosha, Himeji-shi, Hyōgo-ken
- Coordinates: 34°53′28.1″N 134°39′29.3″E

Architecture
- Founder: Shōku
- Completed: c.966

Website
- Official website
- National Important Cultural Property National Historic Site of Japan

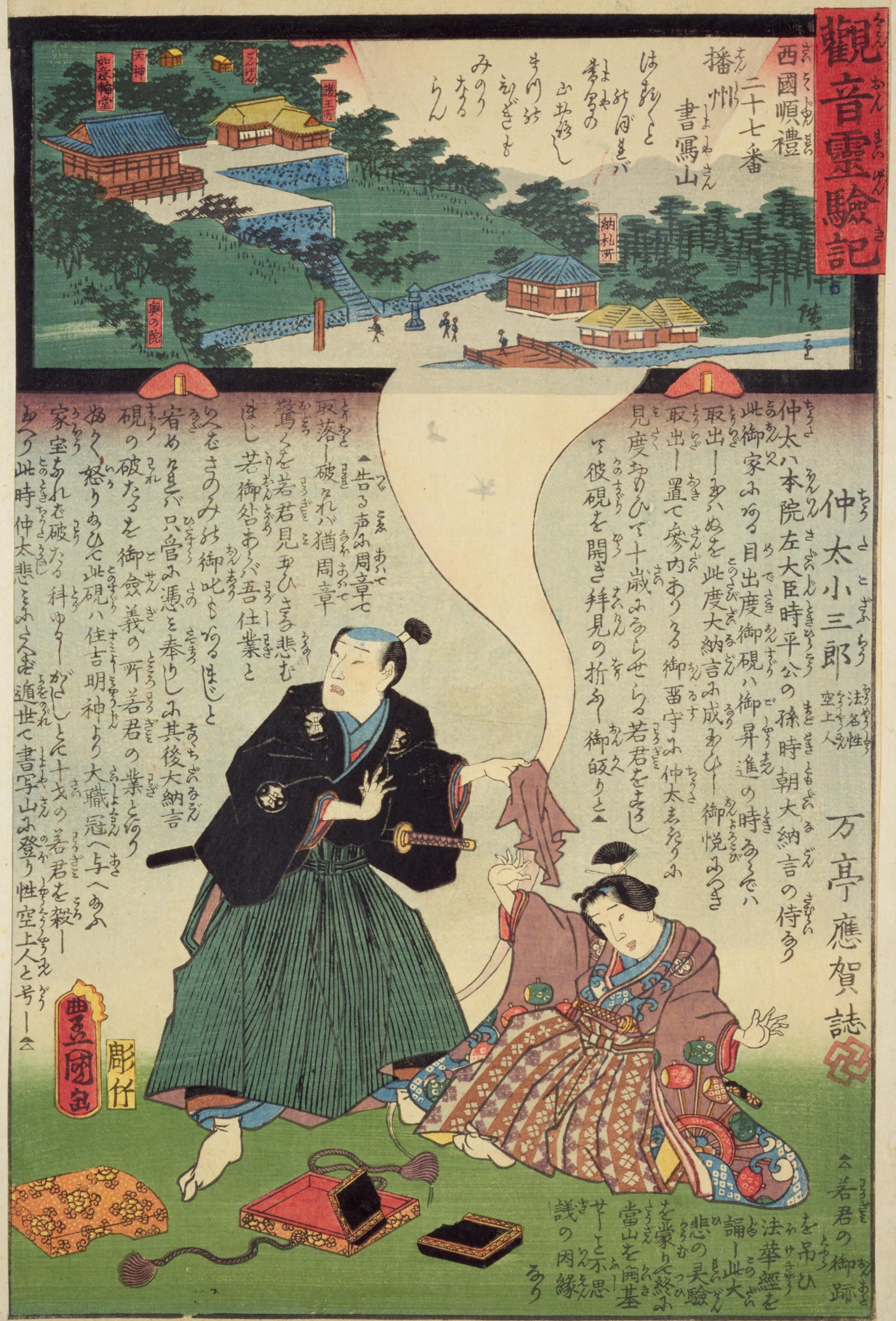
from the picture album "Kannon Reigen ki"

Engyō-ji (圓教寺) is a Buddhist temple located in the city of Himeji, Hyōgo Prefecture, Japan. It belongs to the Tendai sect of Japanese Buddhism and its honzon is a Shaka Sanzon trinity. The temple's full name is Shosha-san Engyō-ji (書寫山 圓教寺).The temple is the 27th stop on the Saigoku Kannon Pilgrimage route. It is the largest of the thirty-three temples of the Saigoku Pilgrimage and is located on Mount Shosha. Its status is so high that it is known as the "Mount Hiei of the West" and it was one of the three major training centers of the Tendai sect, along with Mount Hiei and Mount Daisen. Despite its location far from Heian-kyō, it was visited by many emperors, retired emperors and members of the aristocracy. The precincts of the temple were designated a National Historic Site in 1934.

== Overview ==
The temple grounds are divided into the "Higashidani" (East Valley) stretching from the Niōmon to the Jumyō-in sub-temple; the "Nakadani" (Central Valley) centered around the Maniden (Kannon Hall); and the "Nishidani" (West Valley) with its three halls (Sannō Hall) and Oku-no-in. Mount Shosha, where the temple complex is located, is 371 meters above sea level and is designated as a Mount Shosha Wildlife Protection Area (Special Protection Zone) by Hyōgo Prefecture.

Within the mountain is the Honda clan cemetery, the burial site of the Honda clan of Himeji Domain, which also contains the graves of Miyamoto Mikinosuke, the adopted son of Miyamoto Musashi, who served Honda Tadataki.

From 1398 during the Muromachi period until the Meiji Restoration, women were prohibited from entering the temple, so they would leave a talisman at the Nyōnin-dō (now Nyoirin-ji) at the entrance to the Higashizaka approach.

In recent years, the temple has been used as a filming location for the Hollywood movie "The Last Samurai" released in 2003 (Heisei 15), the NHK Taiga drama "Musashi" (2003), "The Tale of Genji: A Thousand-Year Mystery" (2011), "Tenchi Meisatsu" (2012), the NHK Taiga drama "Gunshi Kanbei" (2014), "Kakekomi Onna to Kakedashi Otoko" and "Kuroi no Shikaku" (2015), "Honnoji Hotel", "March Comes in Like a Lion", "Sekigahara" (2017), and "G.I. Joe: Snake Eyes" (2021).

== History ==
The founding of this temple is uncertain. Mount Shosha was a holy mountain sacred to the kami Susanoo-no-Mikoto from prehistoric times. According to Buddhist legend, Mount Shosha was made from a handful of soil from Vulture Peak by Shaka Nyorai. A temple was founded by the monk Shōku in 966, and was originally called Shosha-ji (書寫寺). Shōku was a member of the aristocratic Tachibana clan and was already 36 years old when he became a monk. After spending about 20 years training in Kyushu, including Mount Kirishima and Mount Sefuri, he set out on a journey in search of sacred sites. In 966, at the age of 57, he established a hermitage on Mount Shosha, marking the beginning of Shosha-ji. In 970, he witnessed a heavenly being worshipping a sacred cherry tree on Mount Shosha. He ordered his disciple Anchin to carve a statue of Nyōirin Kannon from the living cherry tree and built a three-bay hall on the cliff. This was the founding of the Nyōirin-dō (Maniden). Shōku's biography is found in numerous historical sources, including the Genkō Shakusho and the Konjaku Monogatarishū, and he is described as despising mundane affairs and having no interest in glory or fame. Emperor Kazan, who held a particularly strong reverence for Shōku, visited the temple in 986 and bestowed it with the name Engyō-ji. He also donated 100 koku of rice, which the temple used to build a lecture hall. In addition to Emperor Kazan, many other members of the imperial family, including Emperor Go-Shirakawa and Emperor Go-Daigo, have visited the temple, and buildings have been renovated, remodeled, and built at imperial request. It is also known that Ippen and other Ji-shū leaders visited the temple, and just before his death, Ippen entrusted his teachings to the monks of Engyō-ji. The temple claims that Benkei was studied at Engyō-ji, and related items such as his desk have been exhibited, but there is no definite proof that this is historically accurate.

In 1578 Toyotomi Hideyoshi, ordered by Oda Nobunaga to conquer the Chugoku region, invaded the temple during his invasion of Harima Province. He took the Maniden Hall's principal image, the Nyōirin Kannon statue, and other items as trophies to his stronghold at Nagahama in Ōmi Province. Before Hideyoshi's invasion, the temple boasted a landholding of 27,000 koku, was off-limits to messengers from the shugo, and flourished as one of the three major Tendai centers. However, Hideyoshi reduced the landholding to 500 koku, causing the temple's power to decline. The statue was eventually returned; however, this was not the original statue carved by Shōku (this had already been destroyed by a fire in 1492), but was a replacement carved from the same wood.

The Maniden hall was destroyed by fire in December 1921 but was rebuilt in 1933.

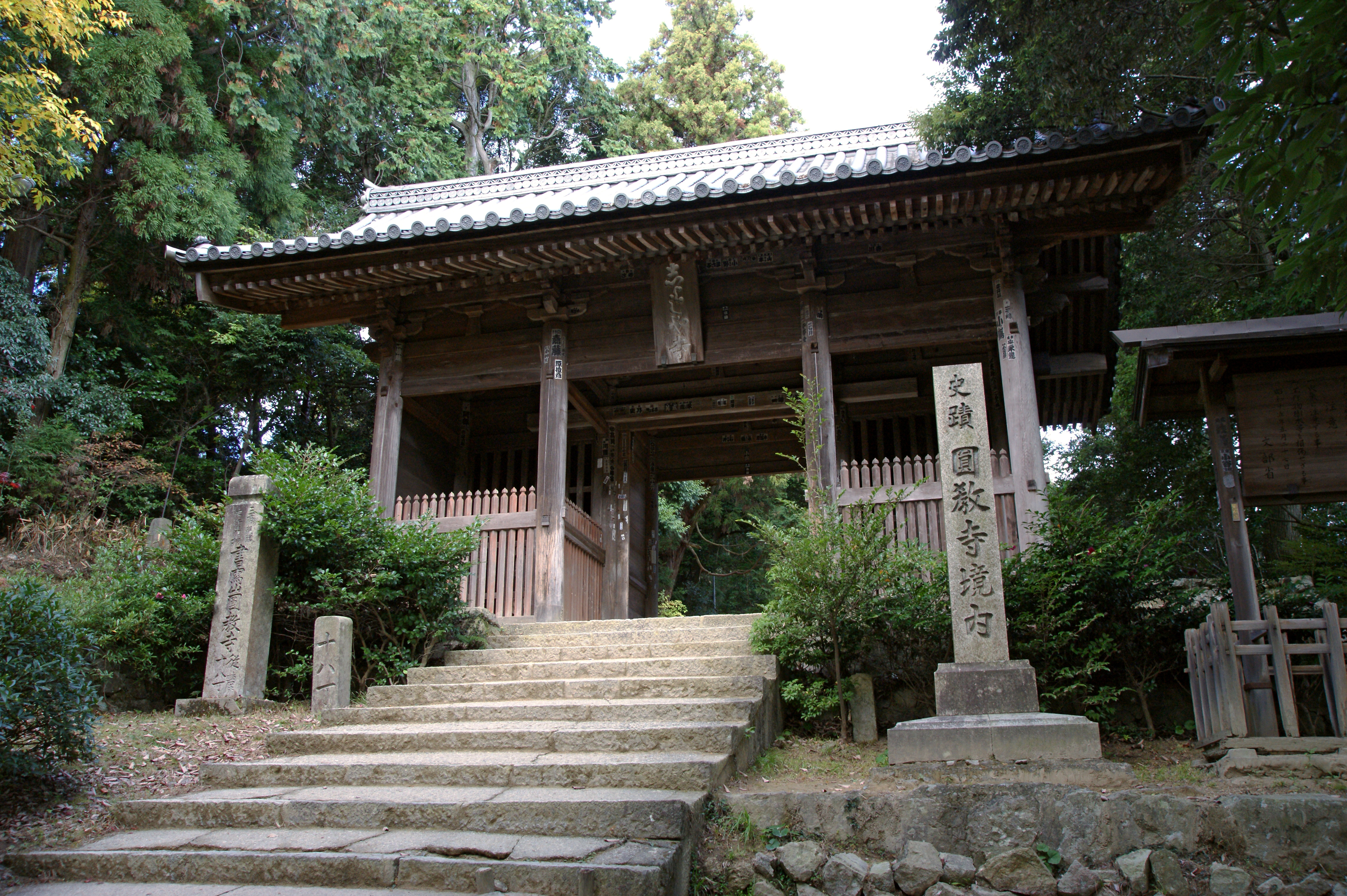
Niōmon

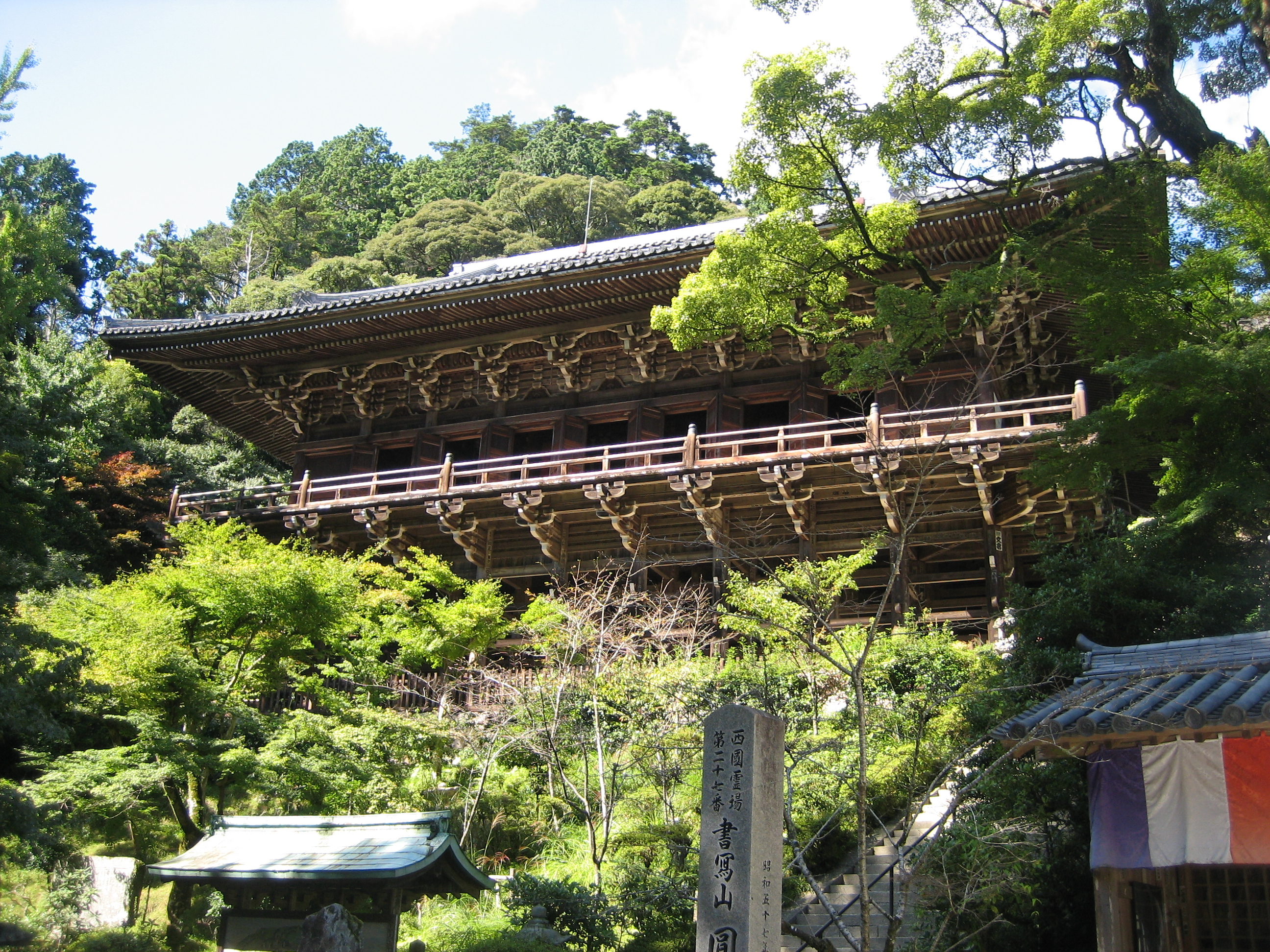
Maniden

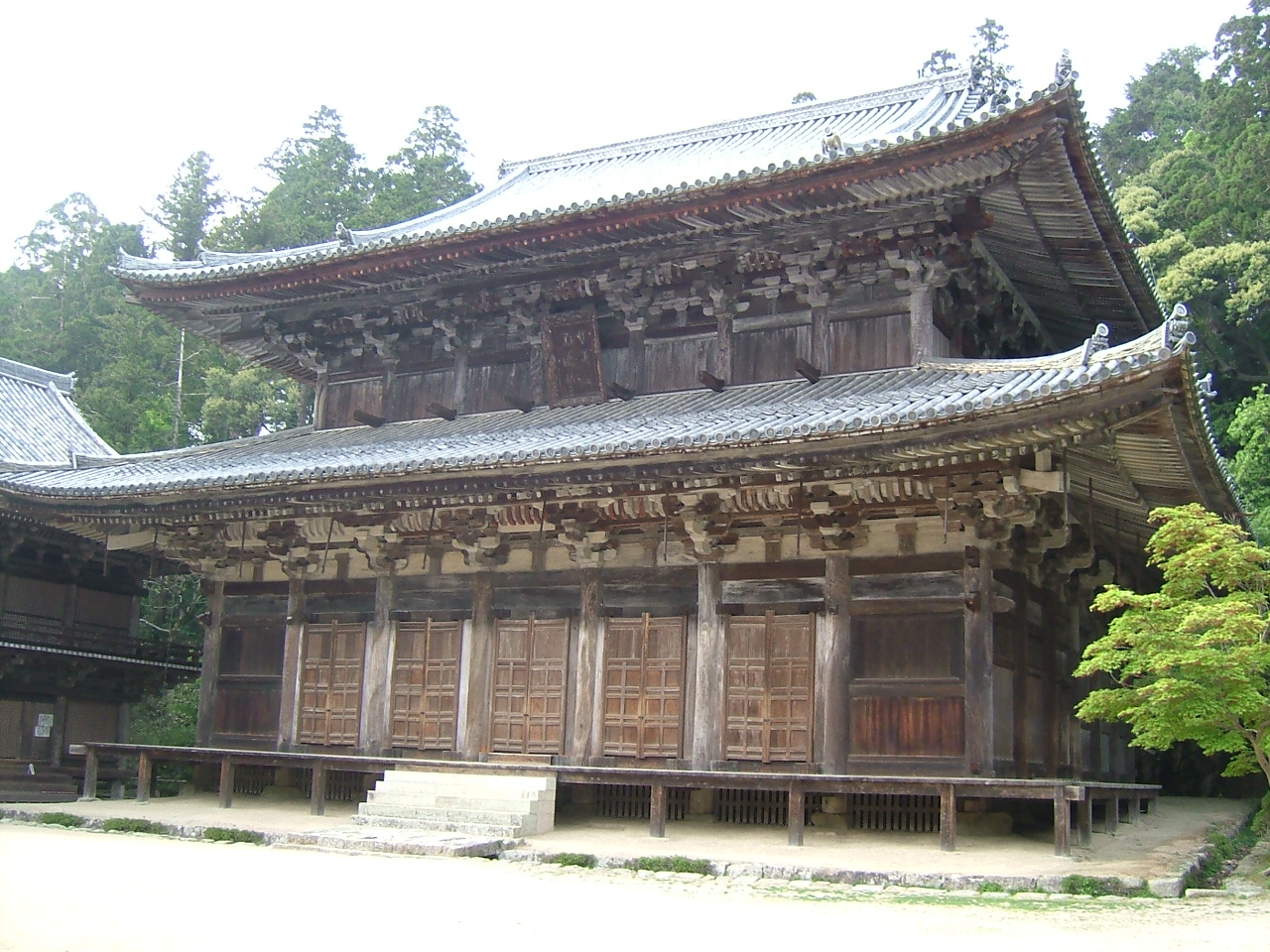
Lecture Hall (Dai-Kōdō)

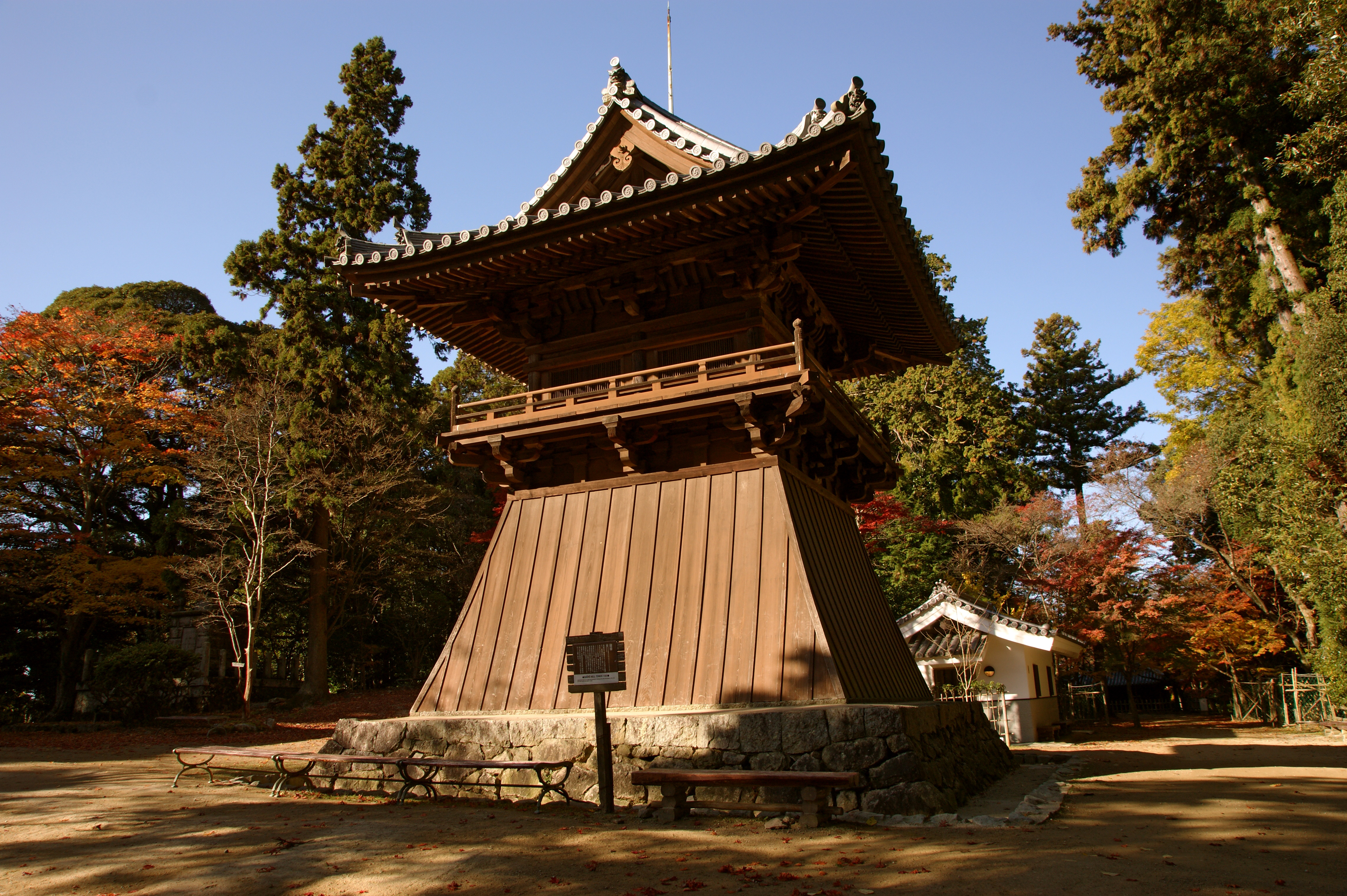
Shōrō

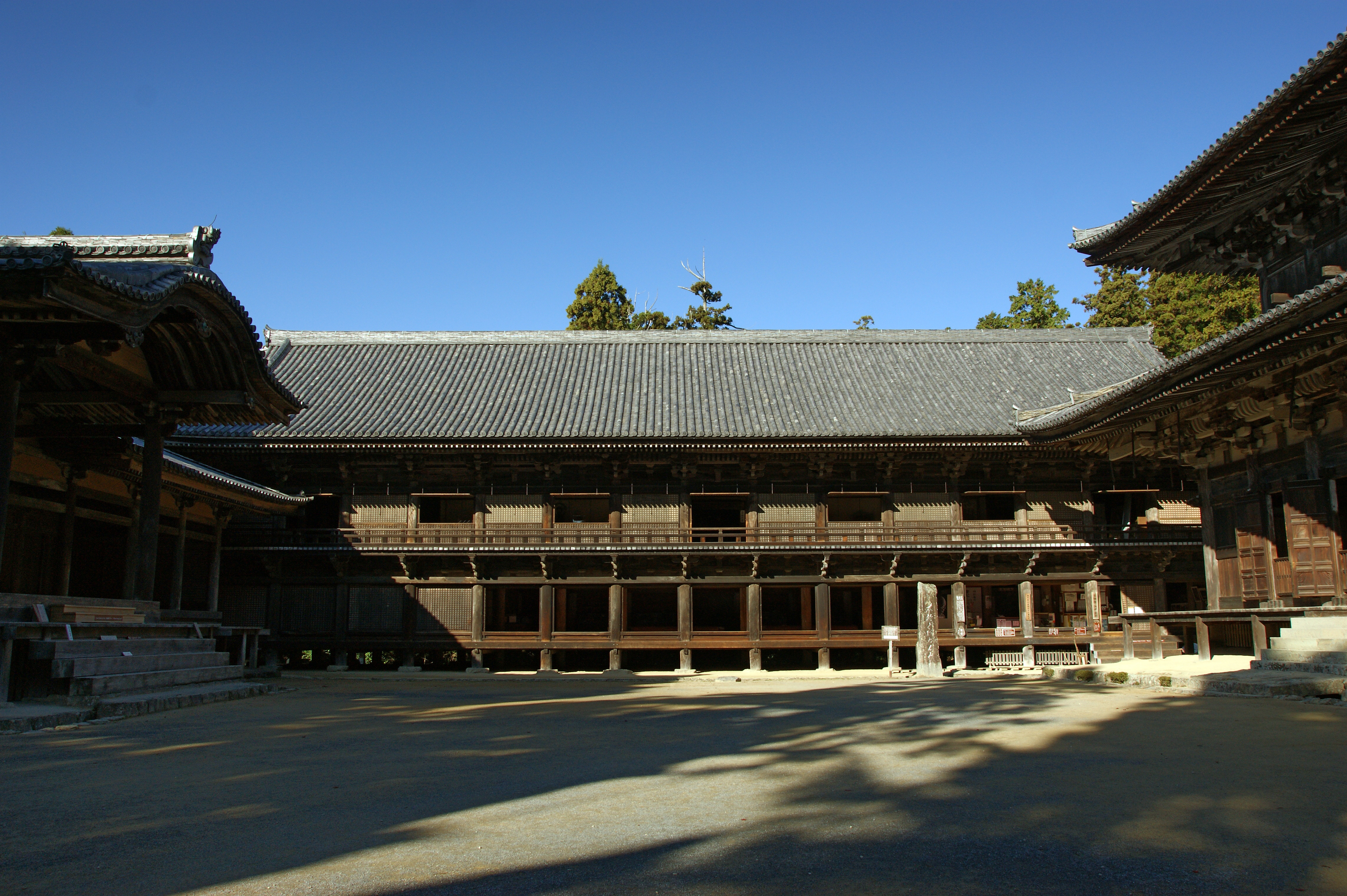
Shoku-dō

The temple is approximately six kilometers from Nozato Station on the JR West Bantan Line.

== Cultural Properties ==
=== National Important Cultural Properties ===
- Dai-Kōdō (大講堂), mid-Muromachi period (1440/1462)
- Shōrō (鐘楼), late-Muromachi period (1467-1572)
- Kongo-dō (金剛堂), late-Muromachi period (1544)
- Shoku-dō (食堂), mid-Muromachi period (1461-1466)
- Jōgyō-dō (常行堂(附：棟札1枚)), mid-Muromachi period (1453)
- Oku-no-in (奥之院), Azuchi-Momoyama to early-Edo period, consisting of 4 structures (Kaisan-dō (1673), Ototensha Shrine (1559), Wakatensha Shrine (1559) and Gōhōdō Worship Hall (1588))
- Maniden (摩尼殿), Showa period (1933)
- Jūmyō-in (十妙院), Edo period; consisting of three structures (Kyakuden (1691) and Kuri (1691) and Karamon (1724))
- Juryō-in (寿量院), Edo period; consisting of three structures (Kyakuden (1688) and Kuri (1688) and Munamon (mid-Edo period))
- Wooden statues of seated Shaka Nyorai flanked by Monju and Fugen Bosatsu (木造釈迦如来及両脇文殊菩薩普賢菩薩像), Heian period; (3 statues)
- Wooden statues of the Four Heavenly Kings (木造四天王立像(大講堂安置), Heian period; (four statues)
- Wooden statue of seated Amida Nyorai (木造阿弥陀如来坐像(常行堂本尊)), Heian period;
- Wooden portrait statue of seated monk Shōku (木造性空坐像(開山堂安置)), Kamakura period (2 statues);

=== Hyōgo Prefecture Designated Tangible Cultural Properties ===
- Niōmon (仁王門), Edo period (1617);
- Yakushi-dō (薬師堂), Kamakura period;
- Honda clan Memorial Chapels (本多家廟屋), Edo period; (5 structures)
- Stone Kasatōba (石造笠塔婆), Kamakura period (1311);
- Bronze bell (銅鐘), Kamakura period;
- Wooden statue of seated Kongō Rikishi (木造金剛薩埵坐像), Nanboku-chō period (1359);
- Statue of seated Nyōirin Kannon (如意輪観音坐像), Kamakura period (1239);
- Seated portrait statue monk Shōku (木造性空上人坐像), Heian period;

=== Himeji City Designated Tangible Cultural Properties ===
- Atago Shrine Main Hall (愛宕社本殿), Edo period (1680);
- Hexagonal stone pagoda (六角坂石造笠塔婆), Edo period (1680);
- Wooden seated statues of Niō (木造金剛力士像（仁王門安置）), Muromachi period (set of 2);

=== Himeji City Designated Intangible Folk Cultural Property ===
- Exorcism ceremony (鬼追い会式）),

== See also ==
- List of Historic Sites of Japan (Hyōgo)
