= List of IPF world champions in powerlifting (equipped) =

This is a list of IPF world championships medalists in equipped powerlifting.

The various federations of powerlifting have their own championships, other respected federations have had their own world champions also (much as boxing world champions are divided among a myriad of organizations). For world champions associated with other federations see the articles for those federations for more information.

== Men - Current Categories ==
=== Category 59 kg – Equipped ===
Meet	Gold	Silver	Bronze
2011 Plzeň	(Russia) Sergey Fedosienko	(Russia) Alexander Kolbin	(Chinese Taipei) Wang Chun-lin
2012 Aguadilla	(Russia) Sergey Fedosienko	(Venezuela) Carlos Garcia	(Poland) Dariusz Wszoła
2013 Stavanger	(Russia) Sergey Fedosienko	(Poland) Pawel Ośmiałowski	(Puerto Rico) Ivan Cancel
2014 Aurora	(Russia) Sergey Fedosienko	(Ecuador) Franklin León	(Brazil) Eudson Lima
2015 Hamm	(Russia) Sergey Fedosienko	(Ecuador) Franklin León	(Chinese Taipei) Wang Chun-lin
2016 Orlando	(Russia) Sergey Fedosienko	(Ecuador) Franklin León	(Chinese Taipei) Lin Yi-chun
2017 Plzeň	(Russia) Sergey Fedosienko	(Chinese Taipei) Lin Yi-chun	(Ecuador) Franklin León
2018 Halmstad	(Russia) Sergey Fedosienko	(Chinese Taipei) Lin Yi-chun	(Japan) Yusuke Satake
2019 Dubai	(Russia) Sergey Fedosienko	(Chinese Taipei) Lin Yi-chun	(India) Suresh P
2021 Stavanger	(Russia) Sergey Fedosienko	(Ecuador) Franklin León	(Chinese Taipei) Lin Yi-chun
2022 Viborg	(Ecuador) Franklin León	(Chinese Taipei) Lin Yi-chun	(United States Virgin Islands) Christopher Tran
2023 Druskininkai	(Ecuador) Franklin León	(Chinese Taipei) Lin Yi-chun	(Chinese Taipei) Wu Chen-ting
2024 Reykjavík			

=== Category 66 kg – Equipped ===
Meet	Gold	Silver	Bronze
2011 Plzeň	(Russia) Sergey Gladkikh	(France) Hassan El Beghiti	(Brazil) Eric Oishi
2012 Aguadilla	(Russia) Sergey Gladkikh	(France) Hassan El Belghiti	(Russia) Konstantin Danilov
2013 Stavanger	(Russia) Konstantin Danilov	(Russia) Sergey Gladkikh	(Chinese Taipei) Hsieh Tsung-ting
2014 Aurora	(Russia) Konstantin Danilov	(Japan) Yoshito Nishimura	(Chinese Taipei) Hsieh Tsung-ting
2015 Hamm	(Russia) Konstantin Danilov	(Russia) Sergey Gladkikh	(Chinese Taipei) Hsieh Tsung-ting
2016 Orlando	(Chinese Taipei) Hsieh Tsung-ting	(United States) Charles Okpoko	(Finland) Antti Savolainen
2017 Plzeň	(Russia) Sergey Gladkikh	(France) Hassan El Belghiti	(Finland) Antti Savolainen
2018 Halmstad	(Russia) Sergey Gladkikh	(Chinese Taipei) Hsieh Tsung-ting	(Finland) Antti Savolainen
2019 Dubai	(Russia) Sergey Gladkikh	(Indonesia) Viki Aryanto	(France) Hassan El Belghiti
2021 Stavanger	(Russia) Sergey Gladkikh	(Chinese Taipei) Hsieh Tsung-ting	(France) Hassan El Belghiti
2022 Viborg	(Chinese Taipei) Hsieh Tsung-ting	(France) Hassan El Belghiti	(Japan) Yusuke Satake
2023 Druskininkai	(Chinese Taipei) Hsieh Tsung-ting	(Japan) Yusuke Satake	(Poland) Mariusz Grotkowski
2024 Reykjavík			

=== Category 74 kg ===
Meet	Gold	Silver	Bronze
2011 Plzeň	(Poland) Jarosław Olech	(Bulgaria) Rostislav Petkov	(Kazakhstan) Denis Ivkov
2012 Aguadilla	(Poland) Jarosław Olech	(United States) Maliek Derstine	(Chinese Taipei) Huang Lung-hsin
2013 Stavanger	(Poland) Jarosław Olech	(Ukraine) Anatoliy Horiachok	(Chinese Taipei) Huang Lung-hsin
2014 Aurora	(Poland) Jarosław Olech	(Russia) Sergei Gaishinets	(Ukraine) Anatoliy Horiachok
2015 Hamm	(Poland) Jarosław Olech	(Russia) Sergei Gaishinets	(Ukraine) Mykola Barannik
2016 Orlando	(Poland) Jarosław Olech	(Ukraine) Mykola Barannik	(Kazakhstan) Andrey Prokopenko
2017 Plzeň	(Poland) Jarosław Olech	(Kazakhstan) Andrey Prokopenko	(Russia) Sergei Gaishinets
2018 Halmstad	(Poland) Jarosław Olech	(Russia) Sergei Gaishinets	(Norway) Kjell Egil Bakkelund
2019 Dubai	(Norway) Kjell Egil Bakkelund	(Poland) Jarosław Olech	(Russia) Sergei Gaishinets
2021 Stavanger	(Norway) Kjell Egil Bakkelund	(Poland) Jarosław Olech	(Russia) Sergei Gaishinets
2022 Viborg	(Norway) Kjell Egil Bakkelund	(Poland) Jarosław Olech	(Ecuador) Alex Ochoa
2023 Druskininkai	(Poland) Jarosław Olech	(Ecuador) Alex Ochoa	(Japan) Go Suzuki
2024 Reykjavík			

=== Category 83 kg ===
Meet	Gold	Silver	Bronze
2011 Plzeň	(Ukraine) Volodymyr Rysiev	(Ukraine) Andriy Naniev	(Kazakhstan) Davranbek Turakhanov
2012 Aguadilla	(Russia) Evgeniy Vasiukov	(Ukraine) Andriy Naniev	(Ukraine) Volodymyr Rysiev
2013 Stavanger	(Norway) Kjell Egil Bakkelund	(Ukraine) Volodymyr Rysiev	(Ukraine) Andriy Naniev
2014 Aurora	(Ecuador) Jose Castillo	(Ukraine) Volodymyr Rysiev	(Ukraine) Andriy Naniev
2015 Hamm	(Ukraine) Andriy Naniev	(Ukraine) Volodymyr Rysiev	(Russia) Aleksey Sorokin
2016 Orlando	(Ukraine) Volodymyr Rysiev	(Ukraine) Andriy Naniev	(Canada) Adam Ramzy
2017 Plzeň	(Ukraine) Andriy Naniev	(Kazakhstan) Ulan Anuar	(Norway) Kim-Raino Roelvaag
2018 Halmstad	(Ukraine) Andriy Naniev	(Ukraine) Mykola Barannik	(Kazakhstan) Ulan Anuar
2019 Dubai	(Ukraine) Mykola Barannik	(Russia) Vladislav Shaibekov	(Russia) Evgeniy Vasiukov
2021 Stavanger	(United States Virgin Islands) Paul Douglas	(Russia) Evgenii Vasiukov	(Ukraine) Mykola Barannik
2022 Viborg	(Ukraine) Mykola Barannik	(United States Virgin Islands) Paul Douglas	(Ukraine) Vitaliy Kolomiiets
2023 Druskininkai	(Ukraine) Mykola Barannik	(Ukraine) Vitaliy Kolomiiets	(Finland) Matias Viiperi
2024 Reykjavík			

=== Category 93 kg ===
Meet	Gold	Silver	Bronze
2011 Plzeň	(Russia) Vladimir Sholskiy	(Ukraine) Mykhailo Bulanyi	(Bulgaria) Zdravko Sarafimov
2012 Aguadilla	(Ukraine) Mykhailo Bulanyi	(Ukraine) Serhiy Bilyi	(Sweden) Patrik Turesson
2013 Stavanger	(Ukraine) Mykhailo Bulanyi	(Ukraine) Serhiy Bilyi	(Russia) Sergey Mashintcov
2014 Aurora	(Russia) Dmitry Inzarkin	(Ukraine) Mykhailo Bulanyi	(Ukraine) Serhiy Bilyi
2015 Hamm	(Ukraine) Serhiy Bilyi	(Russia) Dmitry Inzarkin	(Ukraine) Mykhailo Bulanyi
2016 Orlando	(Ukraine) Serhiy Bilyi	(Russia) Dmitry Inzarkin	(United States) Ian Bell
2017 Plzeň	(Russia) Dmitry Inzarkin	(Brazil) David Coimbra	(Germany) Sascha Stendebach
2018 Halmstad	(Ukraine) Volodymyr Rysiev	(Russia) Dmitry Inzarkin	(Brazil) David Coimbra
2019 Dubai	(Russia) Dmitry Inzarkin	(Ukraine) Volodymyr Rysiev	(Ukraine) Kostiantyn Musiyenko
2021 Stavanger	(Russia) Dmitry Inzarkin	(Ukraine) Volodymyr Rysiev	(Ukraine) Kostiantyn Musiyenko
2022 Viborg	(Ukraine) Kostiantyn Musiyenko	(Ukraine) Volodymyr Rysiev	(Denmark) Nicki Lentz
2023 Druskininkai	(Ukraine) Volodymyr Rysiev	(Ukraine) Kostiantyn Musiyenko	(Japan) Yoshiki Suzuki
2024 Reykjavík			

=== Category 105 kg ===
Meet	Gold	Silver	Bronze
2011 Plzeň	(Luxembourg) Anibal Coimbra	(Russia) Konstantin Lebedko	(France) Sofiane Belkesir
2012 Aguadilla	(Luxembourg) Anibal Coimbra	(Russia) Konstantin Lebedko	(Ukraine) Vadym Dovhanyuk
2013 Stavanger	(Ukraine) Vadym Dovhanyuk	(Russia) Konstantin Lebedko	(Luxembourg) Anibal Coimbra
2014 Aurora	(Ukraine) Vadym Dovhanyuk	(Russia) Yury Belkin	(Russia) Konstantin Lebedko
2015 Hamm	(Ukraine) Dmytro Semenenko	(Norway) Stian Walgermo	(France) Sofiane Belkesir
2016 Orlando	(Ukraine) Dmytro Semenenko	(France) Sofiane Belkesir	(United States) Charles Conner
2017 Plzeň	(Ukraine) Dmytro Semenenko	(Ukraine) Oleksandr Rubets	(Kazakhstan) Zalim Kuvambayev
2018 Halmstad	(Ukraine) Oleksandr Rubets	(Ukraine) Serhiy Bilyi	(Chinese Taipei) Yang Sen
2019 Dubai	(Russia) Sergey Mashintsov	(France) Allan Grenier	(Norway) Kristoffer Eikeland
2021 Stavanger	(Ukraine) Danylo Kovalov	(Russia) Sergei Mashintcov	(United States Virgin Islands) Ian Bell
2022 Viborg	(Ukraine) Sergiy Bilyi	(Ukraine) Oleksandr Rubets	(Norway) Asgeir Hoel
2023 Druskininkai	(United States) Ian Bell	(Ukraine) Sergiy Bilyi	(Norway) Asgeir Hoel
2024 Reykjavík			

=== Category 120 kg ===
Meet	Gold	Silver	Bronze
2011 Plzeň	(Russia) Maxim Barkhatov	(Russia) Andrei Drachev	(Lithuania) Amandas Paulauskas
2012 Aguadilla	(Russia) Maxim Barkhatov	(Bulgaria) Ivaylo Hristov	(Ukraine) Valeriy Karpov
2013 Stavanger	(Ukraine) Oleksiy Rokochyi	(United Kingdom) Dean Bowring	(Belgium) Orhan Bilican
2014 Aurora	(Bulgaria) Ivaylo Hristov	(Ukraine) Oleksiy Rokochyi	(Ukraine) Oleksiy Bychkov
2015 Hamm	(Ukraine) Oleksiy Bychkov	(Belgium) Orhan Bilican	(Kazakhstan) Nurlan Yeshmakhanov
2016 Orlando	(Ukraine) Oleksiy Bychkov	(Kazakhstan) Nurlan Yeshmakhanov	(Ukraine) Oleksiy Rokochyi
2017 Plzeň	(Ukraine) Oleksiy Bychkov	(Czech Republic) Tomáš Šárik	(United States) Quintin Meyer
2018 Halmstad	(Ukraine) Oleksiy Bychkov	(Chinese Taipei) Tien Chi-sen	(France) Sofiane Belkesir
2019 Dubai	(Ukraine) Oleksiy Bychkov	(Lithuania) Amandas Paulauskas	(France) Sofiane Belkesir
2021 Stavanger	(Ukraine) Oleksiy Bychkov	(United Kingdom) Tony Cliffe	(Chinese Taipei) Tien Chi-sen
2022 Viborg	(Ukraine) Oleksiy Bychkov	(Chinese Taipei) Yang Sen	(France) Sofiane Belkesir
2023 Druskininkai	(Ukraine) Oleksiy Bychkov	(Chinese Taipei) Yang Sen	(France) Sofiane Belkesir
2024 Reykjavík			

=== Category +120 kg ===
Meet	Gold	Silver	Bronze
2011 Plzeň	(Ukraine) Volodymyr Svystunov	(Ukraine) Viktor Testsov	(Czech Republic) Milan Špingl
2012 Aguadilla	(Ukraine) Viktor Testsov	(Russia) Andrey Konovalov	(Norway) Carl Yngvar Christensen
2013 Stavanger	(Russia) Andrey Konovalov	(Norway) Carl Yngvar Christensen	(Ukraine) Viktor Testsov
2014 Aurora	(Norway) Carl Yngvar Christensen	(Finland) Kenneth Sandvik	(Sweden) Fredrik Svensson
2015 Hamm	(Russia) Andrey Konovalov	(United States) Blaine Sumner	(United States) Joseph Cappellino
2016 Orlando	(United States) Blaine Sumner	(United States) Joseph Cappellino	(Czech Republic) David Lupač
2017 Plzeň	(Czech Republic) David Lupač	(Ukraine) Volodymyr Svystunov	(Iceland) Júlían J. K. Jóhannsson
2018 Halmstad	(Russia) Andrey Konovalov	(United States) Blaine Sumner	(Iceland) Júlían J. K. Jóhannsson
2019 Dubai	(United States) Blaine Sumner	(Russia) Andrey Konovalov	(Iceland) Júlían J. K. Jóhannsson
2021 Stavanger	(Russia) Andrey Konovalov	(Ukraine) Andrii Shevchenko	(United States Virgin Islands) Joseph Cappellino
2022 Viborg	(Ukraine) Andrii Shevchenko	(United States Virgin Islands) Joseph Cappellino	(Germany) Christoph Seefeld
2023 Druskininkai	(United States) Joseph Cappellino	(Germany) Christoph Seefeld	(Costa Rica) Carlos Campos
2024 Reykjavik			

=== Category Special Olympics International ===
Meet	Gold	Silver	Bronze
2015 Hamm	(United States) Dion Thomas	(United States) Adrian McGhee	(Austria) Andreas Burtscher

== Men - Old categories ==
=== Category 52 kg ===
Meet	Gold	Silver	Bronze
1974 York	(Japan) Hideaki Inaba	(United States) Ken McDowell	(Puerto Rico) Fernando Báez Cruz
1975 Birmingham	(Japan) Hideaki Inaba	(Japan) Haruji Watanabe	(Finland) Juhani Niemi
1976 York	(Japan) Hideaki Inaba	(United States) John Redding	(Finland) Juhani Niemi
1977 Perth	(Japan) Hideaki Inaba	(United Kingdom) Narendra Bhairo	(Finland) Aimo Tuomisto
1978 Turku	(Japan) Hideaki Inaba	(United Kingdom) Narendra Bhairo	(United Kingdom) Phil Stringer
1979 Dayton	(Japan) Hideaki Inaba	(United States) Charles Dunbar	(United Kingdom) Narendra Bhairo
1980 Arlington	(Japan) Hideaki Inaba	(United States) Charles Dunbar	(United Kingdom) Narendra Bhairo
1981 Calcutta	(Japan) Hideaki Inaba	(United States) Charles Dunbar	(Finland) Aimo Tuomisto
1982 Munich	(Japan) Hideaki Inaba	(United States) Charles Dunbar	(United Kingdom) Phil Stringer
1983 Gothenburg	(Japan) Hideaki Inaba	(Finland) Raimo Lehtonen	(Canada) Don McVicar
1984 Dallas	(United Kingdom) Chris Parkinson	(Japan) Hideaki Inaba	(New Zealand) Jeff Madsen
1985 Espoo	(Japan) Hideaki Inaba	(United Kingdom) John Maxwell	(India) P. K.Yesodhara
1986 The Hague	(Japan) Hideaki Inaba	(Finland) Kari Ojalehto	(United Kingdom) John Maxwell
1987 Fredrikstad	(Japan) Hideaki Inaba	(Finland) Kari Ojalehto	(United Kingdom) John Maxwell
1988 Perth	(Japan) Hideaki Inaba	(India) P. K.Yesodhara	(United Kingdom) John Maxwel
1989 Sydney	(Japan) Hideaki Inaba	(United Kingdom) John Clay	(India) P. K.Yesodhara
1990 The Hague	(Japan) Hideaki Inaba	(United States) Hile Phillip	(Chinese Taipei) Chang Chao-Ping
1991 Orebro	(Japan) Hideaki Inaba	(Russia) Sergey Zhuravlev	(United Kingdom) John Clay
1992 Birmingham	(Russia) Sergey Zhuravlev	(Japan) Hideaki Inaba	(India) Sajeevan Bhaskaran
1993 Jönköping	(Poland) Andrzej Stanaszek	(Russia) Sergey Zhuravlev	(Japan) Hideaki Inaba
1994 Johannesburg	(Poland) Andrzej Stanaszek	(Japan) Hideaki Inaba	(Chinese Taipei) Hu Chun-Hsiung
1995 Pori	(Poland) Andrzej Stanaszek	(Japan) Hideaki Inaba	(Norway) Roy Brandtzaeg
1996 Salzburg	(Poland) Andrzej Stanaszek	(Russia) Yaroslav Chopovskiy	(Japan) Hideaki Inaba
1997 Prague	(Poland) Andrzej Stanaszek	(Japan) Hideaki Inaba	(Russia) Sergey Zhuravlev
1998 Cherkasy	(Poland) Andrzej Stanaszek	(Japan) Hideaki Inaba	(India) Vidamalai Loganathan
1999 Trento	(Poland) Andrzej Stanaszek	(Chinese Taipei) Lu Shih-Wu	(India) N. Anbu
2000 Akita	(Poland) Andrzej Stanaszek	DQ N. Anbu	(Russia) Sergey Zhuravlev
2001 Sotkamo	(Chinese Taipei) Hu Chun-Hsiung	(United States) Ervin Gainer	(Poland) Andrzej Stanaszek
2002 Trenčín	(Russia) Ravil Kazakov	(Poland) Andrzej Stanaszek	(Chinese Taipei) Hu Chun-Hsiung
2003 Vejle	(Russia) Sergey Fedosienko	(Poland) Andrzej Stanaszek	(Chinese Taipei) Hu Chun-Hsiung
2004 Cape Town	(Russia) Sergey Fedosienko	(United Kingdom) Patrick Constantine	(Chinese Taipei) Yu Yuan-Chi
2005 Miami	(Russia) Alexey Romanov	(Chinese Taipei) Hsu Chin-Chiang	(Uzbekistan) Ilhomiddin Buriyev
2006 Stavanger	(Poland) Dariusz Wszola	(United Kingdom) Patrick Constantine	(Chinese Taipei) Hsu Chin-Chiang

=== Category 56 kg ===
Meet	Gold	Silver	Bronze
1973 Harrisburg	(United Kingdom) Precious McKenzie	(United States) Lamar Gant	(United States) Vernon Bowser
1974 York	(United States) John Bojazi	(United States) Bowser Vernon	None awarded
1975 Birmingham	(United States) Lamar Gant	(Finland) Viljo Issakainen	(United Kingdom) Ken Thrush
1976 York	(United States) Lamar Gant	(Finland) Yrjö Haatanen	(Finland) Viljo Issakainen
1977 Perth	(United States) Lamar Gant	(United Kingdom) Precious McKenzie	(Finland) Yrjö Haatanen
1978 Turku	(United Kingdom) Precious McKenzie	(Finland) Yrjö Haatanen	(Australia) Anthony Zappia
1979 Dayton	(United States) Lamar Gant	(United Kingdom) Precious McKenzie	(Finland) Juhani Niemi
1980 Arlington	(United Kingdom) Precious McKenzie	(Finland) Juhani Niemi	(United Kingdom) Narendra Bhairo
1981 Calcutta	(Japan) Hiroyuki Isagawa	(United Kingdom) Narendra Bhairo	(Finland) Yrjö Haatanen
1982 Munich	(United States) Lamar Gant	(Finland) Yrjö Haatanen	(United Kingdom) Narendra Bhairo
1983 Gothenburg	(United States) Lamar Gant	(United Kingdom) Narendra Bhairo	(Japan) Hiroyuki Isagawa
1984 Dallas	(United States) Lamar Gant	(Japan) Hiroyuki Isagawa	(India) P J Joseph
1985 Espoo	(Japan) Hiroyuki Isagawa	(Finland) Yrjö Haatanen	(India) Brai Singh
1986 The Hague	(Japan) Hiroyuki Isagawa	(India) P J Joseph	(Republic of Ireland) Gerard McNamara
1987 Fredrikstad	(Republic of Ireland) Gerard McNamara	(United States) David Pattaway	(United Kingdom) Gary Simes
1988 Perth	(Japan) Hiroyuki Isagawa	(United States) David Pattaway	(Republic of Ireland) Gerard McNamara
1989 Sydney	(Japan) Hiroyuki Isagawa	(Chinese Taipei) Chen Chan-lung	(Chinese Taipei) Lee Yung-chang
1990 The Hague	(United Kingdom) Gary Simes	(United States) David Pattaway	(Indonesia) Dennis Thios
1991 Orebro	(Japan) Hiroyuki Isagawa	(United Kingdom) Gary Simes	(United States) Timothy Taylor
1992 Birmingham	(Indonesia) Dennis Thios	(Belgium) Wim Elyn	(United Kingdom) Gary Simes
1993 Jönköping	(Indonesia) Dennis Thios	(Belgium) Wim Elyn	(Japan) Hiroyuki Isagawa
1994 Johannesburg	(Japan) Hiroyuki Isagawa	(India) Jentry Francis	(Germany) Christian Klein
1995 Pori	(Russia) Konstantin Pavlov	(Sweden) Magnus Carlsson	(Japan) Hiroyuki Isagawa
1996 Salzburg	(Russia) Konstantin Pavlov	(Chinese Taipei) Hu Chun-Hsiung	(Sweden) Magnus Carlsson
1997 Prague	(Chinese Taipei) Hu Chun-Hsiung	(Russia) Konstantin Pavlov	(Japan) Hiroyuki Isagawa
1998 Cherkasy	(Russia) Konstantin Pavlov	(Chinese Taipei) Hu Chun-Hsiung	(Norway) Roy Brandtzaeg
1999 Trento	(Russia) Konstantin Pavlov	(Chinese Taipei) Hsieh Tsung-ting	(India) Vidamalai Loganathan
2000 Akita	(Russia) Konstantin Pavlov	(Chinese Taipei) Hsieh Tsung-ting	(India) Jentry Francis
2001 Sotkamo	(Russia) Konstantin Pavlov	(Chinese Taipei) Hsieh Tsung-ting	(Norway) Roy Brandtzaeg
2002 Trenčín	(Russia) Konstantin Pavlov	(Chinese Taipei) Lu Shih-wu	(Chinese Taipei) Hsieh Tsung-ting
2003 Vejle	(Russia) Konstantin Pavlov	(Russia) Ravil Kazakov	(Japan) Hiroyuki Isagawa
2004 Cape Town	(Russia) Konstantin Pavlov	(Chinese Taipei) Lu Shih-wu	(Japan) Hiroyuki Isagawa
2005 Miami	(Russia) Konstantin Pavlov	(United States) Damarrio Holloway	(Japan) Hiroyuki Isagawa
2006 Stavanger	(Japan) Hiroyuki Isagawa	(Chinese Taipei) Lu Shih-wu	(United States) Damarrio Holloway
2007 Solden	(Russia) Sergey Fedosienko	(Chinese Taipei) Lu Shih-wu	(Japan) Hiroyuki Isagawa
2008 St. Johns	(Poland) Dariusz Wszola	(Japan) Hiroyuki Isagawa	(Poland) Pawel Osmialowski
2009 New Delhi	(Russia) Sergey Fedosienko	(India) Suresh Puthiyandi	(Poland) Dariusz Wszola
2010 Potchefstroom	(Russia) Sergey Fedosienko	(Poland) Dariusz Wszola	(Chinese Taipei) Lu Shih-wu

=== Category 60 kg ===
Meet	Gold	Silver	Bronze
1973 Harrisburg	(United States) Allen Lord	(Puerto Rico) Luis Ramos	(United States) Enrique Hernandez
1974 York	(United States) Allen Lord	(United States) Steve Hoxworth	(United States) Gary Wandell
1975 Birmingham	(United States) Enrique Hernandez	(United Kingdom) John Ambler	(Finland) Yrjö Haatanen
1976 York	(United Kingdom) Eddie Pengelly	(Japan) Tominaga Yoshinobu	(Puerto Rico) Luis Ramos
1977 Perth	(United Kingdom) Eddie Pengelly	(United States) Phillip Trujillo	(Sweden) Mats Johansson
1978 Turku	(United States) Lamar Gant	(United Kingdom) Eddie Pengelly	(Finland) Antero Koykka
1979 Dayton	(United Kingdom) Eddie Pengelly	(Finland) Antero Koykka	(Finland) Kullervo Lampela
1980 Arlington	(United States) Lamar Gant	(Finland) Kullervo Lampela	(United States) Ray Verdonck
1981 Calcutta	(United States) Lamar Gant	(United Kingdom) Tony Galvez	(Finland) Kullervo Lampela
1982 Munich	(Finland) Kullervo Lampela	(Sweden) Goran Henrysson	(Belgium) Eddy Van Wemmel
1983 Gothenburg	(Sweden) Goran Henrysson	(France) Lucien De Faria	(Belgium) Eddy Van Wemmel
1984 Dallas	(Sweden) Goran Henrysson	(Belgium) Eddy Van Wemmel	(Finland) Kullervo Lampela
1985 Espoo	(Sweden) Goran Henrysson	(Finland) Kullervo Lampela	(United States) Ernesto Milian
1986 The Hague	(United States) Lamar Gant	(United States) Randall Kea	(Netherlands) Gerard Tromp
1987 Fredrikstad	(United States) Lamar Gant	(Netherlands) Gerard Tromp	(Norway) Jan-Tore Bredalen
1988 Perth	(United States) Lamar Gant	(France) Lucien De Faria	(Netherlands) Gerard Tromp
1989 Sydney	(United States) Lamar Gant	(India) Sandeep Sawant	(France) Lucien De Faria
1990 The Hague	(United States) Lamar Gant	(Republic of Ireland) Gerard McNamara	(Chinese Taipei) Lee Yung-Chang
1991 Orebro	(Netherlands) Gerard Tromp	(Germany) Gunther Icks	(Indonesia) Nanda Talambanua
1992 Birmingham	(Republic of Ireland) Gerard McNamara	(Indonesia) Nanda Talambanua	(United States) Todd Suttles
1993 Jönköping	(Indonesia) Nanda Talambanua	(United States) Todd Suttles	(United Kingdom) Phillip Richard
1994 Johannesburg	(Belgium) Wim Elyn	(United States) Timothy Taylor	(United Kingdom) Gary Simes
1995 Pori	(Belgium) Wim Elyn	(Russia) Valeriy Bogdanov	(India) Sandeep Sawant
1996 Salzburg	(Indonesia) Sutrisno Bin Darimin	(Belgium) Wim Elyn	(Chinese Taipei) Lee Yung-Chang
1997 Prague	(Chinese Taipei) Lee Yung-Chang	(Russia) Alexey Sidorov	(United States) Timothy Taylor
1998 Cherkasy	(Belgium) Wim Elyn	(Republic of Ireland) Gerard McNamara	(Chinese Taipei) Lee Yung-Chang
1999 Trento	(Republic of Ireland) Gerard McNamara	(Russia) Mikhail Andryukhin	(Japan) Hiroyuki Isagawa
2000 Akita	(Russia) Mikhail Andryukhin	(Belgium) Wim Elyn	(Chinese Taipei) Lee Yung-Chang
2001 Sotkamo	(Indonesia) Sutrisno Bin Darimin	(Republic of Ireland) Gerard McNamara	(Russia) Mikhail Andryukhin
2002 Trenčín	(Russia) Mikhail Andryukhin	(Republic of Ireland) Gerard McNamara	(Ukraine) Vitaliy Teteutsa
2003 Vejle	(Russia) Mikhail Andryukhin	(Chinese Taipei) Hsieh Tsung-ting	(Poland) Slawomir Sledz
2004 Cape Town	(Russia) Ravil Kazakov	(Indonesia) Sutrisno Bin Darimin	(Chinese Taipei) Hsieh Tsung-ting
2005 Miami	(Indonesia) Sutrisno Bin Darimin	(Russia) Mikhail Andryukhin	(Chinese Taipei) Hsieh Tsung-ting
2006 Stavanger	(Chinese Taipei) Hsieh Tsung-ting	(United States) Hennis Washington	(Slovakia) Erik Bacinsky
2007 Solden	(Chinese Taipei) Hsieh Tsung-ting	(Russia) Konstantin Pavlov	(Japan) Sato Yoshihiro
2008 St. Johns	(Chinese Taipei) Hsieh Tsung-ting	(Indonesia) Sutrisno Bin Darimin	(France) Etienne-Serge Lited
2009 New Delhi	(Chinese Taipei) Hsieh Tsung-ting	(Russia) Konstantin Danilov	(India) Shyam Singh Rana
2010 Potchefstroom	(Chinese Taipei) Hsieh Tsung-ting	(France) Etienne-Serge Lited	(Algeria) Mohamed Lakha

=== Category 67.5 kg ===
Meet	Gold	Silver	Bronze
1973 Harrisburg	(United States) Donald Blue	(United States) Jack Keammerer	(United Kingdom) Michael McHugh
1974 York	(United States) Donald Blue	(United States) Jack Keammerer	(United Kingdom) Michael McHugh
1975 Birmingham	(United States) Jack Welch	(Canada) James Moir	(Finland) Raimo Välineva
1976 York	(Canada) Mauro Di Pasquale	(United Kingdom) Dhuram Pal	(Sweden) Dennis Attlund
1977 Perth	(United States) Rick Gaugler	(Canada) James Moir	(Australia) Ronald Wilton
1978 Turku	(United States) Michael Bridges	(Canada) Mauro Di Pasquale	(United Kingdom) Desmond Garner
1979 Dayton	(Canada) James Moir	(United Kingdom) Hassan Salih	(United Kingdom) Desmond Garner
1980 Arlington	(United States) Dale Crain Rickey	(Canada) James Moir	(Sweden) Thomas Sjostrom
1981 Calcutta	(United States) Joe Bradley	(United Kingdom) Eddie Pengelly	(Sweden) Stefan Nentis
1982 Munich	(Sweden) Stefan Nentis	(United Kingdom) Eddie Pengelly	(Australia) Glen Waszkiel
1983 Gothenburg	(United States) Robert Wahl	(Sweden) Stefan Nentis	(United Kingdom) Eddie Pengelly
1984 Dallas	(United States) Daniel Austin	(United Kingdom) Eddie Pengelly	(Sweden) Stefan Nentis
1985 Espoo	(United Kingdom) Eddie Pengelly	(Iceland) Kari Elison	(Belgium) Jan Theys
1986 The Hague	(United States) Daniel Austin	(United States) Ausby Alexander	(United Kingdom) Eddie Pengelly
1987 Fredrikstad	(United States) Daniel Austin	(United Kingdom) Eddie Pengelly	(Norway) Steinar Fredheim
1988 Perth	(United States) Daniel Austin	(United Kingdom) Eddie Pengelly	(Sweden) Niklas Yngvesson
1989 Sydney	(United States) Daniel Austin	(Finland) Tuomo Kesalahti	(Canada) Vascol Simpson
1990 The Hague	(United States) Daniel Austin	(United Kingdom) David Mannering	(Poland) Jan Wilczynski
1991 Orebro	(United States) Daniel Austin	(Kazakhstan) Alexey Sivokon	(United Kingdom) Rodney Hypolite
1992 Birmingham	(United States) Daniel Austin	(United Kingdom) Rodney Hypolite	(Russia) Viktor Baranov
1993 Jönköping	(Kazakhstan) Alexey Sivokon	(United Kingdom) Rodney Hypolite	(Poland) Jan Wilczynski
1994 Johannesburg	(Kazakhstan) Alexey Sivokon	(United Kingdom) Rodney Hypolite	(United States) Dominic Sardo
1995 Pori	(Poland) Jan Wilczynski	(United States) Wade Hooper	(Italy) Alessandro Favorito
1996 Salzburg	(United States) Wade Hooper	(Poland) Jan Wilczynski	(Russia) Viktor Baranov
1997 Prague	(Kazakhstan) Alexey Sivokon	(United States) Wade Hooper	(Poland) Jaroslaw Olech
1998 Cherkasy	(Kazakhstan) Alexey Sivokon	(United States) Wade Hooper	(Poland) Jaroslaw Olech
1999 Trento	(Kazakhstan) Alexey Sivokon	(Poland) Jaroslaw Olech	(France) Hassan El Belghiti
2000 Akita	(Kazakhstan) Alexey Sivokon	(Poland) Jaroslaw Olech	(Russia) Evgeniy Dolgov
2001 Sotkamo	(Kazakhstan) Alexey Sivokon	(Poland) Jaroslaw Olech	(Italy) Roberto Sacco
2002 Trenčín	(Poland) Jaroslaw Olech	(Italy) Roberto Sacco	(Finland) Sami Nieminen
2003 Vejle	(Poland) Jaroslaw Olech	(Chinese Taipei) Huang Lung-Hsing	(Sweden) Amit Sehlberg
2004 Cape Town	(Poland) Jaroslaw Olech	(Chinese Taipei) Huang Lung-Hsing	(Sweden) Amit Sehlberg
2005 Miami	(Poland) Jaroslaw Olech	(Russia) Ravil Kazakov	(Sweden) Amit Sehlberg
2006 Stavanger	(Poland) Jaroslaw Olech	(United States) Caleb Williams	(Sweden) Amit Sehlberg
2007 Solden	(Russia) Ravil Kazakov	(France) Hassan El Belghiti	(Japan) Koiwai Masaharu
2008 St. Johns	(France) Hassan El Belghiti	(Brazil) Eric Oishi	(Ukraine) Arkadiy Shalokha
2009 New Delhi	(Russia) Sergei Gladkikh	(France) Hassan El Belghiti	(Russia) Dmitry Makarov
2010 Potchefstroom	(Poland) Jaroslaw Olech	(Russia) Sergei Gladkikh	(Russia) Nikolay Sokolov

=== Category 75 kg ===
Meet	Gold	Silver	Bronze
1973 Harrisburg	(United Kingdom) Ronald Collins	(United States) George Crawford	(United States) Walter Thomas
1974 York	(United Kingdom) Ronald Collins	(United States) Walter Thomas	(United States) George Crawford
1975 Birmingham	(United States) Walter Thomas	(United Kingdom) Peter Fiore	(Iceland) Skúli Óskarsson
1976 York	(United Kingdom) William West	(United States) Anthony Carpino	(Sweden) Lars Backlund
1977 Perth	(United States) Joseph “Doc” Rhodes	(United Kingdom) Peter Fiore	(Sweden) Lars Backlund
1978 Turku	(United Kingdom) Peter Fiore	(Iceland) Skúli Óskarsson	(Finland) Jorma Nyyssonen
1979 Dayton	(United States) Michael Bridges	(Canada) Mauro Di Pasquale	(Sweden) Lars Backlund
1980 Arlington	(United States) Rick Gaugler	(Canada) Mauro Di Pasquale	(Sweden) Lars Backlund
1981 Calcutta	(United Kingdom) Steve Alexander	(Sweden) Lars Backlund	(Iceland) Skúli Óskarsson
1982 Munich	(United States) Rickey Dale Crain	(Finland) Markku Pesonen	(Netherlands) Norwin Martina
1983 Gothenburg	(United States) Rickey Dale Crain	(United Kingdom) Steve Alexander	(Finland) Jarmo Virtanen
1984 Dallas	(United States) Gene Bell	(Australia) Glen Waszkiel	(Belgium) Eric Coppin
1985 Espoo	(Belgium) Eric Coppin	(United States) Gene Bell	(Australia) Glen Waszkiel
1986 The Hague	(Canada) Rick Crilly	(Italy) Raffaele Brasile	(Austria) Alfred Elend
1987 Fredrikstad	(Finland) Jarmo Virtanen	(United States) Rickey Dale Crain	(Italy) Raffaele Brasile
1988 Perth	(Finland) Jarmo Virtanen	(United States) Ausby Alexander	(New Zealand) Kevin Judson
1989 Sydney	(United States) Ausby Alexander	(Finland) Leo Tuominen	(Indonesia) Petru Triharyanto
1990 The Hague	(United States) Ausby Alexander	(Indonesia) Petru Triharyanto	(Finland) Markku Pesonen
1991 Orebro	(United States) David Ricks	(Finland) Markku Pesonen	(Finland) Ari Virtanen
1992 The Hague	(United States) David Ricks	(Russia) Andrei Mironov	(Indonesia) Petru Triharyanto
1993 Jönköping	(United States) David Ricks	(Commonwealth of Independent States) Valerij Kraus	(Sweden) Per Berglund
1994 Johannesburg	(United States) David Ricks	(Sweden) Per Berglund	(Finland) Jari Laine
1995 Pori	(Poland) Jan Wilczynski	(United States) Wade Hooper	(Italy) Alessandro Favorito
1996 Salzburg	(United States) Daniel Austin	(Sweden) Per Berglund	(Chinese Taipei) Hsieh Yi-Ching
1997 Prague	(Ukraine) Sirazhutdin Bazaev	(Russia) Viktor Baranov	(Chinese Taipei) Hsieh Yi-Ching
1998 Cherkasy	(Ukraine) Sirazhutdin Bazaev	(Russia) Viktor Baranov	(Russia) Victor Furazhkin
1999 Trento	(Ukraine) Sirazhutdin Bazaev	(Russia) Victor Furazhkin	(Russia) Viktor Baranov
2000 Akita	(Russia) Victor Furazhkin	(Russia) Viktor Baranov	(United States) Wade Hooper
2001 Sotkamo	(Russia) Victor Furazhkin	(Russia) Viktor Baranov	(Ukraine) Sirazhutdin Bazaev
2002 Trenčín	(Russia) Victor Furazhkin	(Ukraine) Oleksandr Kutcher	(United States) Wade Hooper
2003 Vejle	(Russia) Victor Furazhkin	(Russia) Viktor Baranov	(Ukraine) Oleksandr Kutcher
2004 Cape Town	(United States) Wade Hooper	(Russia) Dmitriy Dvornikov	(Poland) Jacek Spychala
2005 Miami	(Russia) Victor Furazhkin	(United States) Wade Hooper	(Poland) Jacek Spychala
2006 Stavanger	(United States) Wade Hooper	(Poland) Jacek Spychala	(Chinese Taipei) Huang Lung-Hsing
2007 Solden	(Poland) Jaroslaw Olech	(United States) Wade Hooper	(Russia) Alexander Govorin
2008 St. Johns	(Poland) Jaroslaw Olech	(Chinese Taipei) Huang Lung-Hsing	(Finland) Sami Nieminen
2009 New Delhi	(Poland) Jaroslaw Olech	(Russia) Alexander Gromov	(Ukraine) Arkadiy Shalokha
2010 Potchefstroom	(Russia) Pavel Ozerov	(Kazakhstan) Assyilzhan Almerdenov	(United States) Knute Douglas

=== Category 82.5 kg ===
Meet	Gold	Silver	Bronze
1973 Harrisburg	(United States) Robert McKee	(United Kingdom) Bob Memery	(United States) Vincent Anello
1974 York	(United States) Ernie Frantz	(United States) Frank Barefield	(United States) Dennis Wright
1975 Birmingham	(United Kingdom) Ronald Collins	(United States) Dennis Wright	(Finland) Unto Honkonen
1976 York	(United Kingdom) Ronald Collins	(United States) Walter Thomas	(Canada) Tom Campbell
1977 Perth	(United Kingdom) Ronald Collins	(United Kingdom) William West	(Sweden) Lars Bjorck
1978 Turku	(United States) Walter Thomas	(United Kingdom) William West	(Sweden) Kenneth Mattsson
1979 Dayton	(United Kingdom) Ronald Collins	(United States) Walter Thomas	(Sweden) Kenneth Mattsson
1980 Arlington	(United Kingdom) William West	(United Kingdom) Peter Fiore	(Finland) Jari Tähtinen
1981 Calcutta	(United States) Michael Bridges	(Germany) Max Stamm	(Finland) Veli Kumpuniemi
1982 Munich	(United States) Michael Bridges	(United Kingdom) Mike Duffy	(Germany) Max Stamm
1983 Gothenburg	(United States) Michael Bridges	(Sweden) Lars-Olof Augustsson	(Finland) Jari Tähtinen
1984 Dallas	(United States) Ed Coan	(Finland) Jarmo Virtanen	(United Kingdom) Steve Alexander
1985 Espoo	(Finland) Jarmo Virtanen	(Norway) Kjell Johansen	(United States) Danny Gay
1986 The Hague	(Finland) Jarmo Virtanen	(United States) Sylvester Anderson	(United Kingdom) Mike Duffy
1987 Fredrikstad	(United States) Gene Bell	(Finland) Hannu Malinen	(Norway) Knuth Johansen
1988 Perth	(Finland) Hannu Malinen	(Norway) Ove Hansen	(Netherlands) Ad Schenkels
1989 Sydney	(Finland) Jarmo Virtanen	(United States) Sylvester Anderson	(United Kingdom) Frank Hoskins
1990 The Hague	(Finland) Jarmo Virtanen	(Russia) Alexander Lekomtsev	(United States) Dan Wagman
1991 Orebro	(Netherlands) Piet Van Haaren	(Finland) Markku Vierikko	(United States) Dan Wagman
1992 Birmingham	(Finland) Jarmo Virtanen	(Netherlands) Piet Van Haaren	(Poland) Roman Szymkowiak
1993 Jönköping	(Finland) Jarmo Virtanen	(Poland) Roman Szymkowiak	(United Kingdom) David T Carter
1994 Johannesburg	(United States) Walter Thomas	(Czech Republic) Peter Theuser	(Poland) Roman Szymkowiak
1995 Pori	(Finland) Jarmo Virtanen	(Poland) Roman Szymkowiak	(Czech Republic) Peter Theuser
1996 Salzburg	(Poland) Roman Szymkowiak	(Ukraine) Vasyl Kurtyak	(Czech Republic) Peter Theuser
1997 Prague	(Russia) Sergey Mor	(Ukraine) Dmytro Solovyov	(Czech Republic) Peter Theuser
1998 Cherkasy	(Russia) Sergey Mor	(Ukraine) Dmytro Solovyov	(Ukraine) Vasyl Kurtyak
1999 Trento	(United States) David Ricks	(Russia) Sergey Mor	(Italy) Daniele Ghirardi
2000 Akita	(Russia) Sergey Mor	(United States) David Ricks	(Ukraine) Dmytro Solovyov
2001 Sotkamo	(Russia) Sergey Mor	(France) Frédéric Gandner	(Sweden) Patrik Thuresson
2002 Trenčín	(Ukraine) Dmytro Soloviov	(Poland) Jan Wegiera	(United States) Robert Wagner
2003 Vejle	(Poland) Jan Wegiera	(Ukraine) Sergiy Naleykin	(Sweden) Patrik Thuresson
2004 Cape Town	(Russia) Victor Furazhkin	(Poland) Jan Wegiera	(Finland) Marcel Lindholm
2005 Miami	(Russia) Sergey Bogdanov	(Poland) Jan Wegiera	(United States) David Ricks
2006 Stavanger	(Poland) Jan Wegiera	(United States) David Ricks	(Kazakhstan) Davranbek Turakhanov
2007 Solden	(Russia) Sergey Bogdanov	(United States) David Ricks	(Poland) Jan Wegiera
2008 St. Johns	(Poland) Jan Wegiera	(United States) Wade Hooper	(Venezuela) Jaider Espinoza
2009 New Delhi	(Russia) Alexey Sorokin	(Ukraine) Andriy Nanyev	(Ukraine) Volodymyr Rysev
2010 Potchefstroom	(Russia) Alexey Sorokin	(Ukraine) Volodymyr Rysev	(Ukraine) Andriy Nanyev

=== Category 90 kg ===
Meet	Gold	Silver	Bronze
1973 Harrisburg	(United States) Anthony Fratto	(United States) Jesse Jones	(United States) Tom Farchione
1974 York	(United States) Paul Woods	(United States) Edward Ravenscroft	(United States) Anthony Fratto
1975 Birmingham	(United States) Edward Ravenscroft	(Zambia) Barry O'Brien	(United Kingdom) Eamon Toal
1976 York	(United States) Larry Pacifico	(United Kingdom) Eamon Toal	(Sweden) Ray Yvander
1977 Perth	(United States) Vincent Anello	(United Kingdom) Eamon Toal	(Finland) Unto Honkonen
1978 Turku	(United States) Vincent Anello	(Finland) Unto Honkonen	(United States) Steve Miller
1979 Dayton	(Canada) Tom Campbell	(United States) Roger Estep	(United States) Vincent Anello
1980 Arlington	(United States) Vincent Anello	(Sweden) Conny Nilsson	(United States) Jesse Jones
1981 Calcutta	(United States) Walter Thomas	(Sweden) Kenneth Mattsson	(United Kingdom) William West
1982 Munich	(United States) Walter Thomas	(United Kingdom) William West	(Finland) Sulo Kierivaara
1983 Gothenburg	(Sweden) Kenneth Mattsson	(United Kingdom) David Caldwell	(Sweden) Ove Eriksson
1984 Dallas	(United States) Dennis Wright	(Japan) Totsuharu Maeda	(United Kingdom) David Caldwell
1985 Espoo	(United Kingdom) David Caldwell	(Japan) Totsuharu Maeda	(Czechoslovakia) Janos Nemeshazy
1986 The Hague	(Finland) Jari Tahtinen	(United Kingdom) David Caldwell	(Italy) Floreano Domenici
1987 Fredrikstad	(United States) Sylvester Anderson	(Japan) Totsuharu Maeda	(Italy) Floreano Domenici
1988 Perth	(United States) Gene Bell	(Australia) Laurie Butler	(Australia) Mason Jardine
1989 Sydney	(United States) George Herring	(Finland) Juha Hyttinen	(Finland) Sammy Arling
1990 The Hague	(United States) George Herring	(Germany) Frank Schramm	(Russia) Valeriy Kuznetsov
1991 Orebro	(United States) Sylvester Anderson	(Germany) Frank Schramm	(Finland) Arto Rajala
1992 Birmingham	(United States) Sylvester Anderson	(Germany) Frank Schramm	(Kazakhstan) Fedor Tosunidi
1993 Jönköping	(United States) Gene Bell	(Germany) Frank Schramm	(Iceland) Jon Gunnarsson
1994 Johannesburg	(Germany) Frank Schramm	(Russia) Alexander Lekomtsev	(Finland) Janne Toivanen
1995 Pori	(Finland) Janne Toivanen	(United States) Gene Bell	(Ukraine) Volodymyr Ukhach
1996 Salzburg	(United States) Gene Bell	(Russia) Alexander Dekhanov	(Norway) Erik Stiklestad
1997 Prague	(United States) Gene Bell	(Norway) Erik Stiklestad	(France) Frédéric Buttigieg
1998 Cherkasy	(Ukraine) Sergiy Romanenko	(Poland) Roman Szymkowiak	(France) Roy Brandtzaeg
1999 Trento	(Russia) Andrey Tarasenko	(Russia) Fedenko Dmitriy	(Ukraine) Sergiy Romanenko
2000 Akita	(Russia) Andrey Tarasenko	(Ukraine) Ivan Freydun	(Czech Republic) Peter Theuser
2001 Sotkamo	(Russia) Andrey Tarasenko	(Ukraine) Ivan Freydun	(Czech Republic) Peter Theuser
2002 Trenčín	(Ukraine) Ivan Freydun	(Belarus) Nikolai Morozov	(Russia) Dmitriy Fedenko
2003 Vejle	(Ukraine) Ivan Freydun	(Russia) Andrey Tarasenko	(Italy) Daniele Ghirardi
2004 Cape Town	(Russia) Andrey Tarasenko	(Russia) Alexey Zvarykin	(Poland) Michal Wilk
2005 Miami	(Russia) Andrey Tarasenko	(Poland) Michal Wilk	(Ukraine) Sergiy Romanenko
2006 Stavanger	(Sweden) Patrik Turesson	(Netherlands) Pjotr Van der Hoek	None awarded
2007 Solden	(Russia) Andrey Belyayev	(Italy) Daniele Ghirardi	(Ukraine) Andriy Krymov
2008 St. Johns	(United States) Daniel Williams	(Sweden) Patrik Turesson	(United States) David Ricks
2009 New Delhi	(Ukraine) Mykhailo Bulanyi	(Ukraine) Andriy Krymov	(Poland) Jan Wegiera
2010 Potchefstroom	(Ukraine) Mykhailo Bulanyi	(Russia) Vladimir Sholskiy	(Kazakhstan) Zalim Kuvambayev

=== Category 100 kg ===
Meet	Gold	Silver	Bronze
1973 Harrisburg	(United States) William Seno	(United States) Jim Taylor	None awarded
1974 York	(United States) Larry Pacifico	(United States) Marvin Phillips	(United States) Mike MacDonald
1975 Birmingham	(United States) Larry Pacifico	(United States) Marvin Phillips	(Finland) Raimo Halvorsen
1976 York	(United Kingdom) Paul Jordan	(United States) Vincent Anello	(United Kingdom) Anthony Fitton
1977 Perth	(United States) Larry Pacifico	(Sweden) Ulf Morin	(Finland) Reijo Kiviranta
1978 Turku	(United States) Larry Pacifico	(United Kingdom) Ray Nobile	(Finland) Reijo Kiviranta
1979 Dayton	(United States) Larry Pacifico	(Sweden) Ray Yvander	(Finland) Reijo Kiviranta
1980 Arlington	(United States) Mark Dimiduk	(United Kingdom) Anthony Stevens	(Finland) Reijo Kiviranta
1981 Calcutta	(United States) James Cash	(Sweden) Conny Nilsson	(United Kingdom) Anthony Stevens
1982 Munich	(Sweden) Kenneth Mattsson	(United States) James Cash	(United Kingdom) Anthony Stevens
1983 Gothenburg	(United States) Frederick Hatfield	(United States) Ladnier Joe	(Sweden) Conny Nilsson
1984 Dallas	(United Kingdom) Anthony Stevens	(West Germany) Mieczyslaw Szafranski	(Australia) Dino Toci
1985 Espoo	(United Kingdom) Anthony Stevens	(Sweden) Conny Nilsson	(Belgium) Hugo De Grauwe
1986 The Hague	(United Kingdom) Anthony Stevens	(Sweden) Conny Nilsson	(Belgium) Hugo De Grauwe
1987 Fredrikstad	(Sweden) Conny Nilsson	(Sweden) Zlatko Radojkovic	(Finland) Aarre Kappyla
1988 Perth	(United States) Ed Coan	(Sweden) Johnny Melander	(United Kingdom) Anthony Stevens
1989 Sydney	(Republic of Ireland) Gerry O'Grady	(Italy) Salvatore Putrino	(Norway) Borge Ovrebo
1990 The Hague	(Finland) Juha Hyttinen	(United Kingdom) Mark Cullimore	(Netherlands) Henning Hijman
1991 Orebro	(United States) George Herring	(Ukraine) Volodymyr Ivanenko	(Norway) Jon Gunnarsson
1992 Birmingham	(United Kingdom) Brian Reynolds	(Russia) Mikhail Kulikov	(United States) Steve Goggins
1993 Jönköping	(United States) Ed Coan	(Russia) Vladimir Markovsky	(New Zealand) Derek Pomana
1994 Johannesburg	(United States) Ed Coan	(Russia) Vladimir Markovsky	(Finland) Arto Rajala
1995 Pori	(United States) Ed Coan	(Russia) Vladimir Markovsky	(Norway) Carl Christoffersen
1996 Salzburg	(Finland) Janne Toivanen	(Russia) Vladimir Markovsky	(The Bahamas) Kevin Woodside
1997 Prague	(Ukraine) Oleksiy Soloviov	(The Bahamas) Kevin Woodside	(United Kingdom) Samuel Watt
1998 Cherkasy	(Ukraine) Oleksiy Soloviov	(Lithuania) Andrius Gecas	(Ukraine) Volodymyr Ukhach
1999 Trento	(Russia) Nikolai Suslov	(Ukraine) Oleksiy Soloviov	(United States) Anthony Harris
2000 Akita	(Russia) Nikolai Suslov	(Ukraine) Sergiy Makrushyn	(Kazakhstan) Dmitriy Panfilov
2001 Sotkamo	(Ukraine) Alexey Vishnitsky	(Russia) Yuriy Fedorenko	(Poland) Krzysztof Welna
2002 Trenčín	(Ukraine) Oleksiy Rockochyy	(Russia) Yuriy Fedorenko	(Ukraine) Alexey Vishnitsky
2003 Vejle	(Ukraine) Alexey Vishnitsky	(Russia) Maxim Barkhatov	(Ukraine) Oleksiy Rockochyy
2004 Cape Town	(Ukraine) Ivan Freydun	(Russia) Maxim Barkhatov	(United States) Charr Gahagen
2005 Miami	(Ukraine) Ivan Freydun	(United States) Jason Beck	(Netherlands) Anibal Coimbra
2006 Stavanger	(Norway) Andreas Hjelmtveit	(United States) Jason Beck	(Sweden) Jens Flood
2007 Solden	(Russia) Andrey Tarasenko	(Russia) Konstantin Lebedko	(Ukraine) Sergiy Pevnev
2008 St. Johns	(Ukraine) Sergiy Pevnev	(Poland) Jacek Wiak	(Netherlands) Anibal Coimbra
2009 New Delhi	(Russia) Konstantin Lebedko	(Ukraine) Ivan Freydun	(Ukraine) Sergiy Pevnev
2010 Potchefstroom	(Ukraine) Ivan Freydun	(Russia) Konstantin Lebedko	(Netherlands) Anibal Coimbra

=== Category 110 kg ===
Meet	Gold	Silver	Bronze
1973 Harrisburg	(United States) Larry Pacifico	(United States) Tom Scott	(United Kingdom) Anthony Fitton
1974 York	(United States) John Kuc	(United States) William Seno	(United States) Billy Horwitz
1975 Birmingham	(United States) Doug Young	(United Kingdom) David T Carter	(Finland) Hannu Saarelainen
1976 York	(United States) Doug Young	(Finland) Hannu Saarelainen	(United States) Phillips Marvin
1977 Perth	(United States) Doug Young	(United States) Clay Patterson	(Finland) Hannu Saarelainen
1978 Turku	(United States) Terry McCormick	(Finland) Hannu Saarelainen	(Sweden) Ulf Morin
1979 Dayton	(United States) John Kuc	(Finland) Hannu Saarelainen	(Sweden) Ulf Morin
1980 Arlington	(United States) John Kuc	(Finland) Hannu Saarelainen	(United Kingdom) Arthur White
1981 Calcutta	(Finland) Reijo Kiviranta	(Finland) Hannu Saarelainen	(United States) Dan Wohleber
1982 Munich	(Finland) Hannu Saarelainen	(Netherlands) Siem Wulfse	(Canada) Ross Darnell
1983 Gothenburg	(United States) Steve Wilson	(Netherlands) Ab Wolders	(Finland) Hannu Saarelainen
1984 Dallas	(United States) Dave Jacoby	(United Kingdom) Mark Savage	(Finland) Hannu Saarelainen
1985 Espoo	(United States) Dave Jacoby	(United Kingdom) Mark Savage	(United Kingdom) John Neighbour
1986 The Hague	(United States) Frederick Hatfield	(Sweden) Samuli Kivi	(United Kingdom) John Neighbour
1987 Fredrikstad	(United States) Dave Jacoby	(United Kingdom) Arthur White	(Australia) Dino Toci
1988 Perth	(United States) Dave Jacoby	(Australia) Dino Toci	(Finland) Aarre Kappyla
1989 Sydney	(United Kingdom) John Neighbour	(United States) Dave Jacoby	(Sweden) Johnny Melander
1990 The Hague	(Finland) Aarre Kappyla	(United States) Willie Bell	(Hungary) Sandor Loska
1991 Orebro	(Iceland) Guðni Sigurjonsson	(United States) Dave Jacoby	(Austria) Leopold Krendl
1992 Birmingham	(United States) Dave Jacoby	(Iceland) Guðni Sigurjonsson	(Russia) Andrey Mustrikov
1993 Jönköping	(Russia) Andrey Mustrikov	(Finland) Ano Turtiainen	(Finland) Markko Haarakangas
1994 Johannesburg	(United States) Kirk Karwoski	(New Zealand) Derek Pomana	(Finland) Ano Turtiainen
1995 Pori	(New Zealand) Derek Pomana	(United States) Jeff Douglas	(Canada) Ralph Celio
1996 Salzburg	(New Zealand) Derek Pomana	(Ukraine) Volodymyr Ivanenko	(Iceland) Audunn Jonsson
1997 Prague	(New Zealand) Derek Pomana	(Ukraine) Volodymyr Ivanenko	(Ukraine) Mykhailo Starov
1998 Cherkasy	(Russia) Alexey Gankov	(Ukraine) Volodymyr Ivanenko	(Russia) Vyacheslav Piskunov
1999 Trento	(Ukraine) Volodymyr Ivanenko	(Russia) Alexey Gankov	(United Kingdom) Clive Henry
2000 Akita	(Ukraine) Volodymyr Ivanenko	(Sweden) Jorgen Ljungberg	(Hungary) Istvan Arvai
2001 Sotkamo	(Russia) Valentin Dedyulia	(New Zealand) Derek Pomana	(Hungary) Istvan Arvai
2002 Trenčín	(Russia) Valentin Dedyulia	(Russia) Nikolay Suslov	(New Zealand) Derek Pomana
2003 Vejle	(Russia) Yuriy Fedorenko	(New Zealand) Derek Pomana	(Poland) Krzysztof Welna
2004 Cape Town	(Russia) Nikolay Suslov	(Russia) Yuriy Fedorenko	(Ukraine) Roman Voroshylin
2005 Miami	(Russia) Nikolay Suslov	(Russia) Yuriy Fedorenko	(Ukraine) Roman Voroshylin
2006 Stavanger	(Bulgaria) Ivailo Hristov	(Belgium) Orhan Bilican	(Poland) Marian Czarkowski
2007 Solden	(Russia) Maxim Barkhatov	(Ukraine) Oleksiy Rokochiy	(Czech Republic) Tomas Sarik
2008 St. Johns	(Ukraine) Oleksiy Rokochiy	(Ukraine) Valeriy Karpov	(United States) Mastrean Michael
2009 New Delhi	(Russia) Maxim Barkhatov	(Ukraine) Oleksiy Rokochiy	(Poland) Jacek Wiak
2010 Potchefstroom	(Russia) Maxim Barkhatov	(Ukraine) Sergiy Pevnev	(Ukraine) Valeriy Karpov

=== Category 125 kg ===
Meet	Gold	Silver	Bronze
1981 Calcutta	(United States) Ernie Hackett	(Canada) Tom Magee	(Iceland) Jon Pall Sigmarsson
1982 Munich	(United States) John Gamble	(Sweden) Roger Ekstrom	(Netherlands) Ab Wolders
1983 Gothenburg	(Sweden) Lars Norén	(Australia) Joe McGowan	(France) Jean-Pierre Brulois
1984 Dallas	(Netherlands) Ab Wolders	(France) Jean-Pierre Brulois	(Finland) Aatos Nevanpaa
1985 Espoo	(United States) Tom Henderson	(United Kingdom) Sean Spillane	(Sweden) Yngve Gustavsson
1986 The Hague	(Sweden) Lars Norén	(Netherlands) Siem Wulfse	(United States) Larry Kidney
1987 Fredrikstad	(United Kingdom) John Neighbour	(Finland) Kyösti Vilmi	(Denmark) Soren Oldenborg
1988 Perth	(Finland) Kyösti Vilmi	(United Kingdom) Neil Hurst	(Netherlands) Berend Veneberg
1989 Sydney	(Finland) Kyösti Vilmi	(United States) Calvin Smith	(Sweden) Jorgen Lindblad
1990 The Hague	(Finland) Kyösti Vilmi	(United States) Kirk Karwoski	(Netherlands) Robert Van der Tak
1991 Orebro	(United States) Kirk Karwoski	(Ukraine) Victor Naleikin	(Denmark) Soren Oldenborg
1992 Birmingham	(United States) Kirk Karwoski	(Ukraine) Victor Naleikin	(Germany) Michael Brugger
1993 Jönköping	(United States) Kirk Karwoski	(Ukraine) Victor Naleikin	(Iceland) Guon Sigurjonsson
1994 Johannesburg	(Ukraine) Viktor Naleikin	(United States) Scott Smith	(Norway) Sturla Davidsen
1995 Pori	(United States) Kirk Karwoski	(Norway) Sturla Davidsen	(Canada) Ed Brost
1996 Salzburg	(United States) Kirk Karwoski	(Japan) Daisuke Midote	(Austria) Leopold Krendl
1997 Prague	(Norway) Sturla Davidsen	(Canada) Ed Brost	(New Zealand) Wayne Pomana
1998 Cherkasy	(Russia) Maxim Podtynniy	(Iceland) Audunn Jonsson	(United States) Tony Leiato
1999 Trento	(Russia) Maxim Podtynniy	(Iceland) Audunn Jonsson	(Ukraine) Volodymyr Muravlyov
2000 Akita	(Japan) Daisuke Midote	(Ukraine) Vitaliy Papazov	(Russia) Patric McGettigan
2001 Sotkamo	(Ukraine) Vitaliy Papazov	(Russia) Andrey Malanichev	(Ukraine) Volodymyr Muravlyov
2002 Trenčín	(Russia) Andrey Malanichev	(Hungary) Istvan Arvai	(Ukraine) Volodymyr Muravlyov
2003 Vejle	(Hungary) Istvan Arvai	(Ukraine) Vitaliy Papazov	(Russia) Andrey Malanichev
2004 Cape Town	(Hungary) Istvan Arvai	(Ukraine) Vitaliy Papazov	(Ukraine) Yevgen Yarymbash
2005 Miami	(Ukraine) Yevgen Yarymbash	(Russia) Andrey Malanichev	(Poland) Dariusz Mirowski
2006 Stavanger	(Iceland) Audunn Jonsson	(United Kingdom) Clive Henry	(United States) Anthony Cardella
2007 Solden	(United States) Anthony Cardella	(United Kingdom) Clive Henry	(Ukraine) Oleksandr Shepіl
2008 St. Johns	(Ukraine) Oleksandr Shepil	(United States) Michael Tucscherer	(Sweden) Olaf Wiklund
2009 New Delhi	(Russia) Igor Gagin	(Ukraine) Viktor Testsov	(United States) Greg Wagner
2010 Potchefstroom	(Russia) Igor Gagin	(United States) Nicholas Weite	(Czech Republic) Tomas Sarik

=== Category open ===
- 1973–1980: +110 kg
- 1981–2010: +125 kg

Meet	Gold	Silver	Bronze
1973 Harrisburg	(United States) Don Reinhoudt	None awarded	None awarded
1974 York	(United States) Don Reinhoudt	(United States) Doyle Kenady	(United States) Joseph White
1975 Birmingham	(United States) Don Reinhoudt	(Tonga) John Phillip	(United Kingdom) Alderson John
1976 York	(United States) Don Reinhoudt	(Tonga) John Phillip	(Finland) Taito Haara
1977 Perth	(Finland) Taito Haara	(Finland) Kemppainen Kari	(Tonga) John Phillip
1978 Turku	(United States) Doyle Kenady	(Finland) Taito Haara	(United Kingdom) Steven Zetolofsky
1979 Dayton	(United States) Bill Kazmaier	(United States) Paul Wrenn	(Sweden) Juhani Niemi
1980 Arlington	(United States) Doyle Kenady	(United Kingdom) Andy Kerr	(Finland) Juhani Heinonen
1981 Calcutta	(United States) Paul Wrenn	(Australia) Alex Kapica	(Australia) Raymond Rigby
1982 Munich	(Canada) Tom Magee	(United States) Wayne Bouvier	(United Kingdom) Andy Kerr
1983 Gothenburg	(United States) Bill Kazmaier	(United Kingdom) Andy Kerr	(Australia) Raymond Rigby
1984 Dallas	(United States) Lee Moran	(United Kingdom) Andy Kerr	(Australia) Raymond Rigby
1985 Espoo	(United States) George Hechter	(United Kingdom) Andy Kerr	(Sweden) Thomas Stenlund
1986 The Hague	(United States) Mike Hall	(Sweden) Thomas Stenlund	(Sweden) Yngve Gustavsson
1987 Fredrikstad	(Sweden) Lars Norén	(United States) Mike Hall	(Sweden) Yngve Gustavsson
1988 Perth	(United States) O.D. Wilson	(Germany) Rudolf Küster	(Australia) Nat Klenner
1989 Sydney	(United States) Mike Hall	(France) Jean-Pierre Brulois	(Sweden) Sonny Eriksson
1990 The Hague	(France) Jean-Pierre Brulois	(Sweden) Yngve Gustavsson	(Netherlands) Jorksveld Corry Van Jansen
1991 Orebro	(Germany) Hans Zerhoch	(Finland) Kaj Lindstrom	(Russia) Valeriy Schedrin
1992 Birmingham	(Germany) Hans Zerhoch	(Germany) Detlef Glohmann	(Netherlands) Jorksveld Corry Van Jansen
1993 Jönköping	(Germany) Hans Zerhoch	(Austria) Karl Saliger	(United States) Harold Collins
1994 Johannesburg	(Australia) Karl Saliger	(Slovakia) Miroslav Patro	(United States) Shane Hamman
1995 Pori	(Ukraine) Yuriy Spinov	(United States) Shane Hamman	(Sweden) Roger Sandstrom
1996 Salzburg	(Ukraine) Yuriy Spinov	(Russia) Rif Gadiev	(Russia) Roman Ukraintsev
1997 Prague	(Ukraine) Viktor Naleikin	(United States) Brad Gillingham	(Russia) Roman Ukraintsev
1998 Cherkasy	(Hungary) Tibor Meszaros	(Russia) Maxim Guryanov	(Ukraine) Viktor Naleikin
1999 Trento	(Russia) Maxim Gurianov	(United States) Brad Gillingham	(Ukraine) Viktor Naleikin
2000 Akita	(United States) Brad Gillingham	(Lithuania) Zydrunas Savickas	(Russia) Maxim Gurianov
2001 Sotkamo	(United States) Brad Gillingham	(Hungary) Tibor Meszaros	(Japan) Daisuke Midote
2002 Trenčín	(Ukraine) Vitaliy Papazov	(United States) Brad Gillingham	(Japan) Daisuke Midote
2003 Vejle	(United States) Brian Siders	(Ukraine) Volodymyr Muravlyov	(Japan) Daisuke Midote
2004 Cape Town	(United States) Brian Siders	(Ukraine) Volodymyr Muravlyov	(Czech Republic) Zdenek Sedmik
2005 Miami	(Russia) Vladimir Bondarenko	(Japan) Daisuke Midote	(Finland) Jari Martikainen
2006 Stavanger	(Finland) Ove Lehto	(Finland) Jari Martikainen	(United States) Randall Harris
2007 Solden	(Russia) Vladimir Bondarenko	(United States) Brad Gillingham	(Finland) Ove Lehto
2008 St. Johns	(Finland) Jari Martikainen	(Sweden) Johnny Wahlqvist	(Japan) Daisuke Midote
2009 New Delhi	(United Kingdom) Dean Bowring	(Russia) Oleg Gagin	(Czech Republic) Milan Spingl
2010 Potchefstroom	(Poland) Daniel Grabowski	(Russia) Oleg Gagin	(United States) Brad Gillingham

== Women - Current categories ==
=== Category 47 kg – Equipped ===
Meet	Gold	Silver	Bronze
2011 Plzeň	(Chinese Taipei) Chen Wei-ling	(Japan) Yukako Fukushima	(Russia) Valentina Vermenyuk
2012 Aguadilla	(Chinese Taipei) Chen Wei-ling	(Japan) Fukushima Yukako	(Finland) Raija Jurkko
2013 Stavanger	(Chinese Taipei) Chen Wei-ling	(Russia) Valentina Vermenyuk	(Puerto Rico) Maria Luisa Vasquez
2014 Aurora	(Chinese Taipei) Chen Wei-ling	(Japan) Yukako Fukushima	(Russia) Anastasya Strufa
2015 Hamm	(Japan) Yukako Fukushima	(Puerto Rico) Maria Luisa Vasquez	(Austria) Ilka Schwengl-Forsthuber
2016 Orlando	(Chinese Taipei) Chen Wei-ling	(Japan) Yukako Fukushima	(Puerto Rico) Luisa Maria Vazquez
2017 Plzeň	(Indonesia) Widari	(Japan) Yukako Fukushima	(Russia) Aigul Sitdikova

=== Category 52 kg – Equipped ===
Meet	Gold	Silver	Bronze
2011 Plzeň	(Russia) Natalia Salnikova	(Colombia) Vilma Ochoa Vargas	(Ukraine) Oksana Dmytruk Chumak
2012 Aguadilla	(Russia) Natalia Salnikova	(Colombia) Vilma Ochoa Vargas	(Ukraine) Anastasiya Derevyanko
2013 Stavanger	(Russia) Natalia Salnikova	(Ukraine) Anastasiya Derevyanko	(Ecuador) Vilma Ochoa Vargas
2014 Aurora	(Russia) Natalia Salnikova	(Ecuador) Vilma Ochoa Vargas	(Ukraine) Kateryna Klymenko
2015 Hamm	(Russia) Natalia Salnikova	(Ukraine) Anastasiya Derevyanko	(Ukraine) Kateryna Klymenko
2016 Orlando	(Russia) Natalia Salnikova	(Venezuela) Maria Dominguez	(Ukraine) Kateryna Klymenko
2017 Plzeň	(Russia) Natalia Salnikova	(Ecuador) Vilma Ochoa Vargas	(Chinese Taipei) Yen-Tzu Huang

=== Category 57 kg – Equipped ===
Meet	Gold	Silver	Bronze
2011 Plzeň	(Russia) Anna Ryzhkova	(Ukraine) Tetyana Prymenchuk	(Chinese Taipei) Hui-Chun Wu
2012 Aguadilla	(Indonesia) Sri Hartati	(Chinese Taipei) Hui-Chun Wu	(Finland) Mervi Rantamaki
2013 Stavanger	(Indonesia) Sri Hartati	(Russia) Anna Ryzhkova	(Chinese Taipei) Hui-Chun Wu
2014 Aurora	(Russia) Inna Filimonova	(Chinese Taipei) Hui-Chun Wu	(Ecuador) Kenia Monserate
2015 Hamm	(Indonesia) Sri Hartati	(Chinese Taipei) Hui-Chun Wu	(Russia) Inna Filimonova
2016 Orlando	(Indonesia) Sri Hartati	(Russia) Anna Ryzhkova	(Russia) Victoria Karlysheva
2017 Plzeň	(Russia) Anna Ryzhkova	(Chinese Taipei) Hui-Chun Wu	(Ecuador) Kenia Monserate

=== Category 63 kg – Equipped ===
Meet	Gold	Silver	Bronze
2011 Plzeň	(Ukraine) Larysa Solovyova	(Ukraine) Tetyana Akhmamyetyeva	(Kazakhstan) Kira Pavlovskaya
2012 Aguadilla	(Ukraine) Larysa Solovyova	(Indonesia) Noviana Sari	(Russia) Irina Poletaeva
2013 Stavanger	(Ukraine) Larysa Soloviova	(Ukraine) Tetyana Akhmamyetyeva	(Indonesia) Noviana Sari
2014 Aurora	(Ukraine) Larysa Soloviova	(Brazil) Cicera Tavares	(Russia) Maria Dubenskaya
2015 Hamm	(Ukraine) Larysa Soloviova	(Russia) Maria Dubenskaya	(Indonesia) Noviana Sari
2016 Orlando	(Ukraine) Larysa Soloviova	(Brazil) Cicera Tavares	(Russia) Olga Adamovich

=== Category 72 kg – Equipped ===
Meet	Gold	Silver	Bronze
2011 Plzeň	(United States) Priscilla Ribic	(Russia) Yulia Medvedeva	(Brazil) Ana Castellain
2012 Aguadilla	(Russia) Yulia Medvedeva	(Brazil) Ana Castellain	(United States) Priscilla Ribic
2013 Stavanger	(Brazil) Ana Castellain	(Russia) Yulia Medvedeva	(Ukraine) Antonina Kniazieva
2014 Aurora	(United States) Priscilla Ribic	(Brazil) Ana Castellain	(Canada) Rhea Stinn
2015 Hamm	(United States) Priscilla Ribic	(Brazil) Ana Castellain	(Norway) Marte Elverum
2016 Orlando	(Brazil) Ana Castellain	(United States) Priscilla Ribic	(Norway) Marte Elverum
2017 Plzeň	(United States) Priscilla Ribic	(Norway) Marte Elverum	(Canada) Rhea Stinn
2018 Halmsted	(United States) Kelsey McCarthy	(Canada) Rhea Stinn	(Norway) Marte Elverum
2019 Dubai	(United States) Kelsey McCarthy	(Norway) Marte Elverum	(Russia) Lidiia Zaiats

=== Category 84 kg – Equipped ===
Meet	Gold	Silver	Bronze
2011 Plzeň	(Ukraine) Olena Kozlova	(Netherlands) Ielja Strik	(United States) Blyn Liane
2012 Aguadilla	(Ukraine) Olena Kozlova	(Netherlands) Ielja Strik	(United States) Liane Blyn
2013 Stavanger	(Netherlands) Ielja Strik	(United States) Liane Blyn	(Norway) Heidi Arnesen Hille
2014 Aurora	(Ukraine) Olena Kozlova	(United States) Liane Blyn	(Netherlands) Ielja Strik
2015 Hamm	(Russia) Valeria Timoshchuk	(United States) Liane Blyn	(Ukraine) Yevheniia Tishakova
2016 Orlando	(United States) Liane Blyn	(Netherlands) Ielja Strik	(Ukraine) Yevheniia Tishakova]

=== Category +84 kg – Equipped ===
Meet	Gold	Silver	Bronze
2011 Plzeň	(Russia) Galina Karpova	(Ukraine) Inna Orobets	(Netherlands) Brenda Van der Meulen
2012 Aguadilla	(Chinese Taipei) Chang Ya-Wen	(Ukraine) Inna Orobets	(Netherlands) Brenda Van der Meulen
2013 Stavanger	(Russia) Olga Gemaletdinova	(Norway) Hildeborg Hugdal	(Chinese Taipei) Ya-Wen Chang
2014 Aurora	(Russia) Olga Gemaletdinova	(United States) Bonica Lough	(Norway) Hildeborg Hugdal
2015 Hamm	(Russia) Olga Gemaletdinova	(Russia) Elena Kucherenko	(Ukraine) Inna Orobets
2016 Orlando	(United States) Bonica Lough	(Chinese Taipei) Ya-Wen Chang	(Ukraine) Inna Orobets]

== Women - Old categories ==
=== Category 44 kg ===
Meet	Gold	Silver	Bronze
1980 Lowell	(United States) Fruth Joan	(Japan) Ono Yuko	(Japan) Haruko Saikachi
1981 Honolulu	(United States) Donna Wicker	(Japan) Yoshida Hisako	(United Kingdom) Suzanne Smith
1982 Birmingham	(United States) Ginger Lord	(United Kingdom) Ann Brown	(Canada) Kelly Bonnie
1983 Adelaide	(United States) Cheryl Jones	(Japan) Yoshida Hisako	(Australia) Glenda Bottica
1984 Santa Monica	(United States) Cheryl Jones	(Belgium) Marie-France Vassart	(Finland) Anna-Liisa Prinkkala
1985 Vienna	(United States) Cheryl Jones	(United States) Nancy Belliveau	(Belgium) Marie-France Vassart
1986 Hestra	(United States) Judith Gedney	(Finland) Anna-Liisa Prinkkala	(Sweden) Anna-Maija Honka
1987 Perth	(Finland) Anna-Liisa Prinkkala	(Japan) Yoshida Hisako	(United States) Ann Leverett
1988 Brussels	(Japan) Yoshida Hisako	(Finland) Anna-Liisa Prinkkala	(United States) Ann Leverett
1989 Sydney	(Finland) Anna-Liisa Prinkkala	(Finland) Vuokko Viitasaari	(United States) Maria Delcastillo
1990 Jönköping	(Finland) Anna-Liisa Prinkkala	(United Kingdom) Helen Wolsey	(Japan) Yoshida Hisako
1991 New Delhi	(United Kingdom) Helen Wolsey	(Finland) Anna-Liisa Prinkkala	(India) C. Chamundeshwari
1992 Ghent	(United Kingdom) Helen Wolsey	(France) Natalhie Janot	(Finland) Leena Jokitalo
1993 Jönköping	(France) Natalhie Janot	(Finland) Anna-Liisa Prinkkala	(Chinese Taipei) Hsu Yen-Ping
1994 Rotorua	(Finland) Anna-Liisa Prinkkala	(France) Natalhie Janot	(Finland) Raija-Anneli Koskinen
1995 Chiba	(Finland) Raija-Anneli Koskinen	(Russia) Svetlana Tesleva	(Finland) Anna-Liisa Prinkkala
1996 Kitchener	(Russia) Svetlana Tesleva	(Finland) Anna-Liisa Prinkkala	(France) Natalhie Janot
1997 Cape Town	(Russia) Svetlana Tesleva	(Finland) Anna-Liisa Prinkkala	(Chinese Taipei) Chang Lien-Ju
1998 Mo i Rana	(Russia) Svetlana Tesleva	(Finland) Raija-Anneli Koskinen	(Finland) Anna-Liisa Prinkkala
1999 Thisted	(Russia) Svetlana Tesleva	(Chinese Taipei) Chen Chun-Ju	(Finland) Anna-Liisa Prinkkala
2000 Buenos Aires	(Russia) Svetlana Tesleva	(Chinese Taipei) Chen Chun-ju	(Finland) Vuokko Viitasaari
2001 Frydek-Mistek	(Finland) Raija-Anneli Koskinen	(Chinese Taipei) Chen Wei-ling	(France) Benedicte Lepanse
2002 Riesa	(Finland) Raija-Anneli Koskinen	(Chinese Taipei) Chen Wei-ling	(France) Benedicte Lepanse
2003 Chicago	(Finland) Raija-Anneli Koskinen	(Russia) Svetlana Tesleva	(Chinese Taipei) Chen Wei-ling
2004 Cahors	(Finland) Koskinen Raija-Anneli	(United States) Ashley Robbins	(United States) Carder Tina
2005 Ylitornio	(Finland) Raija-Anneli Koskinen	(Chinese Taipei) Chen Wei-ling	(United States) Cheryl Anderson
2006 Stavanger	(Finland) Raija-Anneli Koskinen	(Japan) Hara Azusa	(France) Sylviane Bechar

=== Category 48 kg ===
Meet	Gold	Silver	Bronze
1980 Lowell	(Australia) Sue Roberts	(Canada) Collette Marentette	(Canada) P. Marentette
1981 Honolulu	(United States) Terry Dillard	(Canada) Denise Peres	(Canada) Claudetty Dionne
1982 Birmingham	(United States) Terry Dillard	(Belgium) Joel Smal	(Canada) Claudetty Dionne
1983 Adelaide	(United States) Diana Rowell	(Belgium) Joelle Smal	(Japan) Kazue Imai
1984 Santa Monica	(United States) Majic Jones	(Belgium) Bernadette Plouviez	(Belgium) Joelle Smal
1985 Vienna	(Belgium) Bernadett Plouviez	(Sweden) Eva Sanchez	(Canada) Wendy Sperling
1986 Hestra	(Belgium) Marie-France Vassart	(Sweden) Eva Sanchez	(Finland) Vuokko Viitasaari
1987 Perth	(Finland) Vuokko Viitasaari	(Netherlands) Irma Ruler	(United States) Shirley Gutierrez
1988 Brussels	(Netherlands) Irma Ruler	(United States) Sherry Renee Burns	(Finland) Vuokko Viitasaari
1989 Sydney	(France) Claudine Cogniacq	(United States) Glynnis Bierria-Ramirez	(Canada) Gisele Mathiau
1990 Jönköping	(France) Claudine Cogniacq	(Luxembourg) Malou Thill	(Finland) Vuokko Viitasaari
1991 New Delhi	(Luxembourg) Malou Thill	(Finland) Vuokko Viitasaari	(Japan) Hisako Yoshida
1992 Ghent	(France) Claudine Cognacq	(Finland) Vuokko Viitasaari	(Luxembourg) Malou Thill
1993 Jönköping	(France) Claudine Cognacq	(Russia) Yelena Yamskikh	(Chinese Taipei) Vuokko Viitasaari
1994 Rotorua	(Finland) Vuokko Viitasaari	(Chinese Taipei) Lai-Hsiu Chang	(Luxembourg) Malou Thill
1995 Chiba	(Russia) Yelena Yamskikh	(Luxembourg) Malou Thill	(Finland) Vuokko Viitasaari
1996 Kitchener	(Russia) Yelena Yamskikh	(Finland) Raija Koskinen	(Chinese Taipei) Lai-Hsiu Chang
1997 Cape Town	(Russia) Yelena Yamskikh	(Finland) Raija Koskinen	(Finland) Vuokko Viitasaari
1998 Mo I Rana	(Russia) Yelena Yamskikh	(Finland) Leena Jokitalo	(Chinese Taipei) Yen-Yin Chen
1999 Thisted	(Russia) Yelena Yamskikh	(Finland) Raija Koskinen	(Japan) Yukako Fukushima
2000 Pinamar	(Russia) Yelena Yamskikh	(Finland) Raija Koskinen	(Chinese Taipei) Hsin-Yi Chou
2001 Frydek-Mistek	(Russia) Natalia Shapovalova	(Chinese Taipei) Kuan-Ting Chen	(Japan) Yukoko Fukushima
2002 Riesa	(Chinese Taipei) Kuan-Ting Chen	(Russia) Natalya Shapovalova	(United States) Jennifer Maile
2003 Chicago	(Russia) Olesia Lafina	(United States) Jennifer Maile	(Japan) Yukako Fukushima
2004 Cahors	(Russia) Svetlana Tesleva	(Japan) Yukako Fukushima	(United States) Jennifer Maile
2005 Ylitornio	(Russia) Svetlana Tesleva	(Japan) Yukako Fukushima	(Ecuador) Vilma Ochoa
2006 Stavanger	(Japan) Yukako Fukushima	(Chinese Taipei) Chen Wei-ling	(Ecuador) Vilma Ochoa

=== Category 52 kg ===
Meet	Gold	Silver	Bronze
1980 Lowell	(United States) Terry Dillard	(Canada) Josie Gingras	(Australia) Linda Vickers
1981 Honolulu	(Australia) Sue Roberts	(United States) Susan Elwyn	(Canada) Josie Gingras
1982 Birmingham	(Australia) Sue Jordan-Roberts	(United States) Vicki Steenrod	(Canada) Kali Bogias
1983 Adelaide	(Canada) Kali Bogias	(Australia) Sue Jordan	(Norway) Grete Gagnaes
1984 Santa Monica	(Canada) Kali Bogias	(Australia) Sue Jordan	(Netherlands) Sisi Dolman
1985 Vienna	(Netherlands) Sisi Dolman	(United States) Magik Jones	(Austria) Dagmar Wang
1986 Hestra	(Netherlands) Sisi Dolman	(United Kingdom) Jenny Hunter	(Sweden) Anna Restrup
1987 Perth	(United States) Mary Jeffrey	(Netherlands) Sisi Dolman	(Australia) Sue Jordan
1988 Brussels	(Netherlands) Sisi Dolman	(Italy) Laura Locatelli	(Norway) Audhild Hansen
1989 Sydney	(Netherlands) Sisi Dolman	(United States) Sherry Renee Burns	(Norway) Audhild Hansen
1990 Jönköping	(Netherlands) Sisi Dolman	(Norway) Audhild Hansen	(Canada) Gisele Mathiau
1991 New Delhi	(Netherlands) Sisi Dolman	(Finland) Liisa Jurkko	(Norway) Grete Gagnaes
1992 Ghent	(United States) Mary Jeffrey	(Finland) Liisa Jurkko	(France) Solange Monge
1993 Jönköping	(Spain) Gema Cristobal	(Russia) Valentina Neliubova	(Finland) Sonja Junttila
1994 Rotorua	(Belgium) Ingeborg Marx	(Norway) Audhild Hansen	(United States) Glynnis Bierria
1995 Chiba	(Kazakhstan) Nadezhda Mir	(France) Claudine Cognacq	(Indonesia) Minquarti
1996 Kitchener	(Russia) Oxana Belova	(Chinese Taipei) Li-Min Lin	(United States) Elisabeth Street

=== Category 56 kg ===
Meet	Gold	Silver	Bronze
1980 Lowell	(United States) Elwyn Susan	(Australia) Gasson Beverley	(Canada) Rhonda Peterson
1981 Honolulu	(United States) Gayla Crain	(Australia) Angie Rountree	(Brazil) Maria Colis
1982 Birmingham	(United States) Julie Thomas	(Japan) Kazumi Tajika	(Finland) Anna-Maija Yliluoma
1983 Adelaide	(United States) Julie Thomas	(Finland) Elina Sorakunnas	(Japan) Umeyo Kunihiro
1984 Santa Monica	(United States) Vicki Steenrod	(United States) Diana Rowell	(Netherlands) Tina Van Duyn-Woodly
1985 Vienna	(Netherlands) Tina Van Duyn-Woodly	(Belgium) Katja Desmet	(Austria) Helga Zipfl
1986 Hestra	(United States) Felicia Johnson	(Canada) Joy Burt	(Sweden) Beatrice Nilsson
1987 Perth	(Canada) Joy Burt	(Australia) Marilyn Wallen	(United Kingdom) Jenny Hunter
1988 Brussels	(United States) Mary Jeffrey	(Canada) Joy Burt	(United Kingdom) Jenny Hunter
1989 Sydney	(United States) Mary Jeffrey	(Canada) Joy Burt	(Sweden) Carin Akervall
1990 Jönköping	(United States) Mary Jeffrey	(Sweden) Carin Akervall	(Japan) Kazuko Ishikawa
1991 New Delhi	(United States) Carrie Graffam	(Norway) Beate Amdahl	(Norway) Audhild Hansen
1992 Ghent	(Canada) Joy Burt	(United States) Carrie Graffam	(Spain) Gema Orellana
1993 Jönköping	(United States) Carrie Graffam-Roud	(Belgium) Ingeborg Marx	(Kazakhstan) Nadezhda Mir
1994 Rotorua	(Kazakhstan) Nadezhda Mir	(Norway) Ingjerd Pytte	(Chinese Taipei) Ya-Ling Chen
1995 Chiba	(United States) Carrie Boudreau	(Russia) Irina Orekhova	(Sweden) Suzanne Hagersand
1996 Kitchener	(United States) Carrie Boudreau	(Ukraine) Svetlana Poplavskaya	(United States) Cathleen Kelii

=== Category 60 kg ===
Meet	Gold	Silver	Bronze
1980 Lowell	(United States) Karen Gajda	(Australia) P. Dorian	(Australia) Heidi Wittesch
1981 Honolulu	(United States) Eileen Todaro	(Australia) Heidi Wittesch	(United Kingdom) Donna Webb
1982 Birmingham	(United States) Ruthi Shafer	(Netherlands) Tina Woodley	(United Kingdom) Rita Bass
1983 Adelaide	(United States) Ruthi Shafer	(New Zealand) Cathy Millen	(United Kingdom) Rita Bass
1984 Santa Monica	(United States) Diane Frantz	(Japan) Umeo Kunihiro	(United Kingdom) Rita Bass
1985 Vienna	(United States) Vicki Steenrod	(West Germany) Alice Kargl	(Japan) Umeyo Kunihiro
1986 Hestra	(United Kingdom) Rita Bass	(Netherlands) Tina Woodley	(Sweden) Pirjo Mustonen
1987 Perth	(United States) Vicki Steenrod	(West Germany) Alice Kargl	(Australia) Kerry Boyce
1988 Brussels	(West Germany) Silvana Bollmann	(Australia) Marilyn Wallen	(Norway) Inger Blikra
1989 Sydney	(United States) Judyth Auerbach	(Belgium) Marleen Nelis	(France) Isabelle Mary
1990 Jönköping	(United States) Rachel Mathias	(France) Isabelle Mary	(West Germany) Linda Diewald
1991 New Delhi	(Norway) Ingjer Pytte	(Norway) Inger Blikra	(United Kingdom) Jackie Blasbery
1992 Ghent	(Luxembourg) Marion Hammang	(United States) Rachel Mathias	(Norway) Ingjerd Pytte
1993 Jönköping	(Norway) Beate Amdahl	(Germany) Irmgar Wohlhöfler	(Argentina) Irene Frangi
1994 Rotorua	(Norway) Beate Amdahl	(Germany) Irmger Wohlhöfler	(Japan) Eriko Himeno
1995 Chiba	(Japan) Eriko Himeno	(Belgium) Ingeborg Marx	(Chinese Taipei) Ya-Ching Huang
1996 Kitchener	(United States) Bettina Altizer	(Russia) Marina Kudinova	(Japan) Eriko Himeno

=== Category 67.5 kg ===
Meet	Gold	Silver	Bronze
1980 Lowell	(United States) Jennifer Reid	(Australia) Kris Skaeffington	(Norway) Lillan Jakobsen
1981 Honolulu	(United States) Jennifer Weyland-Reid	(Canada) Ann Connolly	(Brazil) Aberecida Martinez
1982 Birmingham	(United States) Angie Ross	(Australia) Heidi Wittesch	(Canada) Donna Webb
1983 Adelaide	(Australia) Linda Miller	(Australia) Heidi Wittesch	(United Kingdom) Donna Webb
1984 Santa Monica	(United States) Ruthi Shafer	(Japan) Yorko Tamura	(India) Sumita Laha
1985 Vienna	(United States) Ruthi Shafer	(Australia) Julie Holmes	(Finland) Helena Koponen
1986 Hestra	(Australia) Heidi Wittesch	(India) Sumita Laha	(Finland) Helena Koponen
1987 Perth	(United States) Deborah McElroy	(Netherlands) Liz Odendaal	(Australia) Heidi Wittesch
1988 Brussels	(United States) Jackie Pierce	(Netherlands) Liz Odendaal	(Belgium) Marleen Nelis
1989 Sydney	(United States) Vicki Steenrod	(Sweden) Kristina Bohlin	(Belgium) Mary-Paul Geldhof
1990 Jönköping	(United States) Jackie Pierce	(Finland) Minna Rehn	(Belgium) Marleen Nelis
1991 New Delhi	(Soviet Union) Yekaterina Tanakova	(Germany) Irmgar Wolhofler	(India) Sarala Shetty
1992 Ghent	(Russia) Yekaterina Tanakova	(Germany) Irmgar Wolhofler	(Belgium) Myriam Busselot
1993 Jönköping	(Russia) Yekaterina Tanakova	(Ukraine) Yelena Sukhoruk	(Sweden) Lisa Sjöstrand
1994 Rotorua	(Russia) Yekaterina Tanokova	(Sweden) Liisa Sjöstrand	(Russia) Nataliya Magula
1995 Chiba	(Sweden) Lisa Sjöstrand	(Russia) Yekaterina Tanakova	(Chinese Taipei) Hsiu-Chiung Chen
1996 Kitchener	(Sweden) Lisa Sjöstrand	(Russia) Yekaterina Tanakova	(Japan) Ayako Ikeya

=== Category 75 kg ===
Meet	Gold	Silver	Bronze
1980 Lowell	(Australia) Bev Francis	(United States) Stephania Moody	None awarded
1981 Honolulu	(United Kingdom) Judy Oakes	(Australia) Pam Matthews	(Sweden) Pia Grengman
1982 Birmingham	(Australia) Bev Francis	(United States) Terry Ptomey	None awarded
1983 Adelaide	(Australia) Pam Matthews	(United States) Jenniffer Weyland	(Canada) Wanda Wilson
1984 Santa Monica	(United States) Deborah McElroy-Patton	(Norway) Tove Eriksen	(Canada) Vicki Goss
1985 Vienna	(Australia) Heidi Wittesch	(West Germany) Stefanoula Giannolidis	(Netherlands) Tina Borgstede
1986 Hestra	(United States) Deborah Patton	(Australia) Tracy Spizzo	(Belgium) Ingrid Nelis
1987 Perth	(United States) Terry Byland	(Belgium) Ingrid Nelis	(Belgium) Marleen Nelis
1988 Brussels	(Australia) Heidi Wittesch	(Belgium) Mary-Paule Geldhof	(Belgium) Ingrid Nelis
1989 Sydney	(Netherlands) Liz Odendaal	(United States) Tammy Dianda	(Belgium) Ingrid Nelis
1990 Jönköping	(Netherlands) Liz Odendaal	(Belgium) Ingrid Nelis	(United States) Tammy Dianda
1991 New Delhi	(New Zealand) Kathy Millen	(United States) Tammy Dianda	(Australia) Ellen Stanton
1992 Ghent	(United States) Sara Robertson	(Belgium) Ingrid Nelis	(Russia) Larisa Tarakanova
1993 Jönköping	(United States) Tammy Dianda	(Russia) Nataliya Magula	(Belgium) Myriam Busselot
1994 Rotorua	(Ukraine) Yelena Sukhoruk	(United States) Tammy Dianda	(Norway) Hege Møller
1995 Chiba	(Ukraine) Yelena Sukhoruk	(Switzerland) Liz Odendaal	(Russia) Marina Zhguleva
1996 Kitchener	(United States) Vicky Steenrod	(Russia) Marina Zhguleva	(Norway) Anne Stiklestad
1997 Cape Town	(Russia) Marina Zhguleva	(Norway) Anne Stiklestad	(Argentina) Angela Martinez
1998 Mo I Rana	(Ukraine) Elena Zhukova	(Norway) Anne Stiklestadt	(India) Sarala Shetty
1999 Thisted	(Ukraine) Elena Zhukova	(Germany) Anja Wiezkowiak	(Russia) Elena Ignatenkova
2000 Buenos Aires	(Russia) Tatyana Puzanova	(Germany) Daniela Sell	(Taiwan) Chiu-Hua Hsieh
2001 Frydek-Mistek	(Russia) Svetl Miklasevich	(Norway) Anne Stiklestad	(Ukraine) Tamara Bahriy
2002 Riesa	(Russia) Svetlana Dedulia	(Ukraine) Larysa Ivanova	(Ukraine) Tamara Bahry
2003 Chicago	(Russia) Svetlana Dedulia	(Ukraine) Tamara Bahry	(Ukraine) Lyudmyla Tselenko
2004 Cahors	(Russia) Yulia Zaugolova	(Ukraine) Tamara Bahry	(Norway) Inger Blikra
2005 Ylitornio	(Russia) Marina Kudinova	(Ukraine) Lesya Humynska	(Norway) Inger Blikra
2006 Stavanger	(Norway) Inger Blikra	(Norway) Ingunn Haakonsen	(Germany) Eva-Maria Gall
2007 Soelden	(Russia) Yulia Zaugolova	(Norway) Inger Blikra	(Ukraine) Elizaveta Ivanova
2008 St.John's	(Norway) Inger Blikra	(Canada) Rhaea Fowler	(Finland) Riikka Ylitalo
2009 New Delhi	(Ukraine) Kozlova Olena	(Ukraine) Biruk Yelizaveta	(Norway) Inger Blikra
2010 Potchefstroom	(Ukraine) Yelyzaveta Byruk	(Russia) Svetlana Tsvetkova	(Norway) Inger Blikra
2011 Plzeň	(United States) Priscilla Ribic	(Russia) Yulia Medvedeva	(Brazil) Ana Castellain

=== Category 82.5 kg ===
Meet	Gold	Silver	Bronze
1980 Lowell	(United States) Vicky Gagne	(Australia) Ginette Gardner	None awarded
1981 Honolulu	(Australia) Bev Francis	(United States) Vicky Gagne	(Australia) Ginette Gardner
1982 Birmingham	(United Kingdom) Judy Oakes	(United States) Mary Barreira	(Norway) Tove Eriksen
1983 Adelaide	(Australia) Bev Francis	(United Kingdom) Judy Oakes	(United States) Lou Ann Smith
1984 Santa Monica	(Australia) Bev Francis	(United States) Patty Bent	(India) Bhanumathi Mendon
1985 Vienna	(Australia) Bev Francis	(United States) Juanita Trujillo	(Finland) Anne Lehtokoski
1986 Hestra	(United States) Juanita Trujillo	(West Germany) Eva Bonnaire	(United Kingdom) Yvonne Clarke
1987 Perth	(United States) Maggie Sandoval	(Canada) Dianna Panting	(Canada) Nancy Turner
1988 Brussels	(United Kingdom) Judy Oakes	(United States) Terry Byland	(Canada) Nancy Turner
1989 Sydney	(Australia) Heidi Wittesch	(United Kingdom) Joanne Williams	(Finland) Jaana Paatelainen
1990 Jönköping	(New Zealand) Cathy Millen	(United Kingdom) Judy Oakes	(United Kingdom) Joanne Williams
1991 New Delhi	(United States) Shelby Corson	(Norway) Siw Bakken	(Norway) Hege Hoiland
1992 Ghent	(Sweden) Monika Norberg	(Belgium) Sabine Hermoniers	(Germany) Angelika Moser
1993 Jönköping	(Russia) Natalya Rumiantseva	(United States) Sara Robertson	(Sweden) Monika Norberg
1994 Rotorua	(Russia) Nataliya Rumiantseva	(Ukraine) Ludmila Gaiduchenko	(Sweden) Monika Norberg
1995 Chiba	(Russia) Nataliya Rumyantseva	(United States) Vicky Steenrod	(Germany) Doris Schumacher
1996 Kitchener	(Russia) Nataliya Rumyantseva	(United States) Shelby Corson	(Chinese Taipei) Chia-Chi Lin

=== Category +82.5 kg ===
Meet	Gold	Silver	Bronze
1980 Lowell	(United States) Ann Turbyne	(Canada) Jo Ann Marshall	None awarded
1981 Honolulu	(United States) Wanda Sander	(Australia) Gail Mulhall	(Canada) Jo-Ann Marshall

=== Category 90 kg ===
Meet	Gold	Silver	Bronze
1982 Birmingham	(West Germany) Rebecca Waibler	(United Kingdom) Janice Kerr	(Norway) Wanda Sander
1983 Adelaide	(Australia) Gael Mulhall	(United States) Maris Anny Sternberg	(United Kingdom) Jackie Jackson
1984 Santa Monica	(United States) Annette Bohach	(United Kingdom) Jackie Pepper	None awarded
1985 Vienna	(Norway) Tove Eriksen	(West Germany) Annette Maldener	(United Kingdom) Janice Kerr
1986 Hestra	(United States) Lorraine Constanzo	(United Kingdom) Jacqueline Pepper	(Netherlands) Catharina van Zegeren
1987 Perth	(United Kingdom) Jacqueline Pepper	(United Kingdom) Caroline Bonner	None awarded
1988 Brussels	(United States) Lorraine Constanzo	(Argentina) Adriana Valenzuela	(United Kingdom) Beverley Martin
1989 Sydney	(United States) Barbara Crocker	(United Kingdom) Beverly Martin	(Chinese Taipei) Chen-Yeh Chao
1990 Jönköping	(West Germany) Ulrike Herchenhein	(Netherlands) Barbara Kramer	None awarded
1991 New Delhi	(Sweden) Susanne Tjernell-Formgren	(Chinese Taipei) Chen-Yeh Chao	(Australia) Leanne Johnson
1992 Ghent	(New Zealand) Cathy Millen	(United States) Shelby Corson	(Germany) Ulrike Herchenhein
1993 Jönköping	(New Zealand) Cathy Millen	(Ukraine) Ludmila Gaiduchenko	(United States) Shelby Corson
1994 Rotorua	(New Zealand) Cathy Millen	(Australia) Leanne Johnson	(Russia) Alla Korshunova
1995 Chiba	(Russia) Alla Korshunova	(United States) Shelby Corson	(France) Jessica Vencatachellum
1996 Kitchener	(Russia) Alla Korshunova	(France) Jessica Ferrere	(Chinese Taipei) Shih-Hsien Ku

=== Category +90 kg ===
Meet	Gold	Silver	Bronze
1982 Birmingham	(United States) Annie McElroy	(United States) Jo Ann Marshall	(Norway) Ginette Gardner
1983 Adelaide	(United States) Wanda Sander	None awarded	None awarded
1984 Santa Monica	(United States) Annie McElroy	None awarded	None awarded
1985 Vienna	(United States) Annie McElroy	(Finland) Taina Hakala	(Netherlands) Catharina van Zegeren
1986 Hestra	(United States) Annie McElroy	(United States) Cyndi Regan	(Finland) Taina Hakala
1987 Perth	(United States) Lorraine Constanzo	(West Germany) Annette Maldener	(Finland) Taina Hakala-Rajala
1988 Brussels	(United Kingdom) Myrtle Augee	(Australia) Gael Martin	(Finland) Taina Hakala-Rajala
1989 Sydney	(West Germany) Ulrike Herchenhein	(Finland) Taina Hakala-Rajala	(United Kingdom) Jacqueline Pepper
1990 Jönköping	(France) Sylvie Iskin	(United Kingdom) Beverley Martin	(Sweden) Susanne Tjernell-Formgren
1991 New Delhi	(France) Silvaine Iskin	(Finland) Taina Hakala-Rajala	(Germany) Heidi Munch
1992 Ghent	(United States) Juanita Trujillo	(Germany) Heidi Munch	(France) Jessica Vencatachellum
1993 Jönköping	(Germany) Ulrike Herchenhein	(United States) Juanita Trujillo	(France) Jessica Vencatachellum
1994 Rotorua	(Germany) Ulrike Herchenhein	(Russia) Anastasiya Pavlova	(United States) Shelby Corson
1995 Chiba	(Chinese Taipei) Chen-Yeh Chao	(Russia) Anastasiya Pavlova	(Chinese Taipei) Chia-Sui Lee
1996 Kitchener	(Chinese Taipei) Chen-Yeh Chao	(Germany) Ulrike Herchenhein	(Chinese Taipei) Chia-Sui Lee

== See also ==
- List of IPF world champions in powerlifting (classic)

The primary difference between IPF Classic (Raw) and IPF Equipped powerlifting is the use of supportive gear. Classic allows only a belt, knee sleeves, and wrist wraps, while Equipped allows specialized, single-ply squat/deadlift suits and bench shirts that provide significant support and increase maximum weight lifted.
