= List of powerlifters =

This page lists people known for their accomplishments in powerlifting. Rick Gaugler world champion and record holder in the 148 and 165 lb classes.

== A–F ==
- Ahmed Abukhater
- Alan Aerts
- Paul Anderson (weightlifter)
- Ted Arcidi
- Taylor Atwood
- Nick Best
- Big E (wrestler)
- Fernando Báez (weightlifter)
- Dean Bowring
- Bonica Brown
- Jean-Pierre Brulois
- Hugh Cassidy
- Paul Childress
- Anthony Clark (powerlifter)
- Ed Coan
- Jon Cole (weightlifter)
- Harold Collins (strongman)
- Tazzie Colomb
- Heather Connor
- Scott Danberg
- Connor Dantzler
- Vadym Dovhanyuk
- Ric Drasin
- Stan Efferding
- Rachael Ellering
- Sergey Fedosienko
- C.T. Fletcher
- George Frenn
- Steven Forshaw
- Doug Furnas

== G–L ==
- John Gamble (American football)
- Lamar Gant
- Brad Gillingham
- Karl Gillingham
- Dan Green (powerlifter)
- Billy Gunn
- John Haack
- Mike Hall (powerlifter)
- Shane Hamman
- Frederick Hatfield
- Van Hatfield
- Big James Henderson
- Mark Henry
- Hideaki Inaba
- Hiroyuki Isagawa
- Dave Jacoby (powerlifter)
- Ransilu Jayathilake
- Kirk Karwoski
- Bill Kazmaier
- Doyle Kenady
- Jill Kennedy
- Ryan Kennelly
- Larry Kidney
- Dan Kovacs
- Jason Kristal
- Janae Kroc
- John Kuc
- Naomi Kutin
- Amanda Lawrence (powerlifter)
- Jörgen Ljungberg
- Rick Gaugler

== M–R ==
- Julius Maddox
- Andrey Malanichev
- Tom Magee
- Travis Mash
- Precious McKenzie
- Daniella Melo
- Scot Mendelson
- Brent Mikesell
- Jill Mills
- KC Mitchell
- Tyler Moore (powerlifter)
- Rohan Murphy
- Jesse Norris
- Jarosław Olech
- Jesus Olivares
- Russel Orhii
- Travis Ortmayer
- David Ostlund
- Larry Pacifico
- Phil Pfister
- Mark Philippi
- Derek Pomana
- Derek Poundstone
- Steve Pulcinella
- Don Reinhoudt
- Mark Rippetoe
- Gene Rychlak

== S–Z ==
- Žydrūnas Savickas
- Nick Scott (bodybuilder)
- Brian Siders
- Jón Páll Sigmarsson
- Louie Simmons
- Agata Sitko
- Alexey Sivokon
- Eric Spoto
- Ken Sprague
- Brady Stewart
- Braun Strowman
- Blaine Sumner
- Andrey Tarasenko (powerlifter)
- Terry Todd
- Ano Turtiainen
- Berend Veneberg
- Dave Waddington
- Johnny Wahlqvist
- Jim Williams (powerlifter)
- O.D. Wilson
- Ab Wolders
- Bob Young (American football)
- Doug Young (powerlifter)
