= David Jacoby =

David or Dave Jacoby may refer to:

- David Jacoby (politician)
- David Jacoby (sportscaster)
- Dave Jacoby (powerlifter)
- David Jacoby (historian)
