= Mike Hall (powerlifter) =

American powerlifter

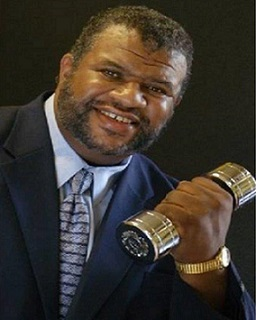
- Born: Mike Hall; October 3, 1956 (age 69) (United States) Lewes, Delaware, U.S.
- Status: Retired 1991
- Occupations: Powerlifter, Motivational Speaker
- Height: 6 ft 2 in (1.88 m)
- Spouse: Toni Hall
- Children: Renata, Briana and Brittany

Competition record

Powerlifting

Representing United States

IPF World Championships
Gold medal – first place	1986 The Hague	+125kg
Silver medal – second place	1987 Fredrikstad	+125kg
Gold medal – first place	1989 Sydney	+125kg

Pan American Weightlifting Championships
Gold medal – first place	1987 Hamilton	+125kg

World Corporate Games
Gold medal – first place	1988	+125kg

ADFPA National Championships
2nd	1983	+125kg
1st	1984	+125kg
1st	1985	+125kg
1st	1986	+125kg
1st	1989	+125kg

USPF National Championships
3rd	1985	+125kg
1st	1986	+125kg
1st	1987	+125kg
2nd	1988	+125kg
1st	1989	+125kg

Lifetime Drug Free Nationals
1st	1989	+125kg

WDFPF World Championships
1st	1990	+125kg

Michael Hall (born October 3, 1956) is a retired American powerlifter, who is perhaps best known for being a pioneer of the drug-free movement in powerlifting. Hall is considered the first African American Super Heavyweight powerlifter to win a World Powerlifting Championship.

Hall succeeded in setting numerous American Drug Free Powerlifting Association (ADFPA), American and National records in all three lifts, as well as the total. In addition, he won both the ADFPA and United States Powerlifting Federation (USPF) nationals several times during the same year. He was also the first superheavyweight lifter to win both the IPF and the WDFPF World Championships. At the 1987 IPF World Championships, Hall officially became the first American lifter to squat 900 lb (409 kg) and break the 2200 lb (1000 kg) total under drug tested conditions.

He became the first ADFPA drug-free lifter in powerlifting history under drug tested conditions to bench press over 600 pounds, squat over 900 pounds and break the 2000, 2100, 2200 and 2300 pounds total without the use of anabolic steroids”. Hall, who claims God as his coach, is known as the "World’s Strongest Drug-Free Man". He has been highly decorated as one of the leading anti-drug role models in the United States. In 1992, he appeared on a poster titled Natural Power, which is part of a campaign by the National Federation of High Schools to combat steroid and drug use. The posters were sent to 20,000 schools in the United States, reaching 11 million students.

== Early life ==
Hall was born in Lewes, Delaware to Mary Magdalene Hall and John Westley. As a child, Mike Hall was picked on a lot while growing up in Dagsboro, Delaware. At age 12, Hall started lifting using a tree branch and old car rims. Hall could bench press 400 lb when he was 16.

== Accolades ==
In 1990, then-Delaware Senator Joe Biden proposed key legislation to address steroid use among athletes and student-athletes. Biden authorized legislation to make steroids a Schedule II substance drug. Biden stated Hall was an example of how an athlete does not have to use steroids to be a champion. He said, “Mike Hall holds the current record of the most weight lifted by a drug-free lifter, a record he is proud to share with young athletes who think they need steroids to become a champion. I am proud of Mike Hall who is a native of Delaware.”

In 1996, Hall was inducted into the Delaware Sports Hall of Fame.

In 2019, Hall was referenced in TieBreaker's Homegrown Talent: Every State's Greatest Athlete for Delaware

== Personal records ==
Equipped

- Squat – 931 lb (422 kg)
- Bench press – 633 lb (287 kg)
- Deadlift – 771 lb (350 kg)
- Total - 2336.9 lb (1062 kg)

== Measurements ==
Mike's Measurements
Height: 6’2
Weight: 370-400 lbs
Upper Arm: 24”
Chest: 64”
Neck: 23”
Calves: 22”
Forearms: 18”
Thighs: 35”
Waist: 51”
Only a Texas Tee XXXXXXL was comfortable for Hall.

== Competition results ==
- 1983 ADFPA Nationals 2nd, –SHW-Class (Allentown, PA)

-Squat: 683lbs (310.4kg), Bench 485lbs (220.4kg), Deadlift: 722lbs (328.1kg) Total: 1862lbs (846kg)

- 1984 ADFPA Nationals 1st, –SHW-Class (Wilkes-Barre, PA)

-Squat: 782lbs (355.4kg), Bench: 529lbs (240.1kg), Deadlift: 722lbs (328.1kg), Total: 2033lbs (846kg)

- 1985 ADFPA Nationals 1st, –SHW-Class (Wilkes-Barre, PA)

-Squat: 865lbs (393.3kg), Bench: 578lbs (263kg), Deadlift: 716.5lbs (325.6kg), Total: 2160lbs (981kg)

- 1985 ADFPA Longhorn Powerlifting 1st, –SHW-Class (Austin, TX)

-Squat: 925lbs (420.4kg), Bench: 584lbs (265.4kg), Deadlift: 793lbs (360.4kg), Total: 2303lbs (1046.8kg)

- 1985 USPF Senior Nationals 3rd, –SHW-Class (Chicago, IL)

-Squat: 832lbs (378.2kg), Bench: 573.2lbs (260.5kg), Deadlift: 766.1lbs (348.2kg), Total: 2171.5lbs (987kg)

- 1986 ADFPA Nationals 1st", –SHW-Class (San Jose, CA)

-Squat: 903.9lbs (410.8kg), Bench: 617.2lbs (280.4kg), Deadlift: 711lbs (323.1kg), Total: 2232.1lbs (1014.5kg)

- 1986 ADFPA North American Championships 1st, –SHW-Class (Wilkes-Barre, PA)

-Squat: 905lbs (411kg), Bench: 600lbs (272.7kg), Deadlift: 745lbs (338.6kg), Total: 2250lbs (1022.7kg)

- 1986 IPF Men’s World Powerlifting Championships 1st, –SHW-Class (The Hague, Netherlands)

-Squat: 876.3lbs (398.3kg), Bench: 600lbs (272.7kg), Deadlift: 722lbs (328.1kg), Total: 2160.5lbs (981kg)

- 1986 USPF Senior National 1st, –SHW-Class (Chicago, IL)

-Squat: 909.4lbs (413.3kg), Bench: 600.7lbs (273kg), Deadlift: 755lbs (343.1kg) Total: 2265lbs (1029kg)

- 1987 NAPF Pan American Powerlifting 1st, –SHW-Class (Ontario, Canada)

-Squat: 903.9lbs,(410kg), Bench: 567.6lbs, (258kg), Deadlift:749.5lbs (340.6kg), Total: 2221lbs (1009.5kg)

- 1987 USPF Senior Nationals 1st, –SHW-Class (Chicago, Illinois)

-Squat: 903lbs,(410kg), Bench: 562lbs, (255kg), Deadlift,744lbs (338kg), Total: 2210lbs (1004.5)

- 1987 IPF World Championships 2nd, – SHW-Class (Oslo, Norway)

-Squat: 903lbs,(410kg), Bench: 562lbs, (255kg), Deadlift,744lbs (338kg), Total: 2210lbs (1004.5)

- 1988 Budweiser World Record Breaker 1st, – SHW-Class (Honolulu, Hawaii)

-Squat: 881lbs, (400.4kg), Bench: 622.8lbs (282.7kg), Deadlift: 766.1 (348kg), Total: 2270.7lbs (1032.1)

- 1988 USPF Senior Nationals (tied for 1st), – SHW-Class (Las, Vegas NV)

-Squat: 925.9lbs,(420.8kg), Bench:562.1lbs (255kg), Deadlift: 738lbs (335kg), Total 2226.6lbs ( 1012kg)

- 1988 USPF World Corporate Games 1st, – SHW-Class (California)

-Squat: 837.7lbs, (380.7kg), Bench: 567.6lbs (258kg), Deadlift: 755lbs (343kg) Total: 2160.5lbs (982kg)

- 1989 ADFPA Lifetime Drug Free Nationals 1st, – SHW-Class ( Tempe, Arizona )

-Squat: 931lbs 423kg), Bench: 633lbs (287kg), Deadlift: 771 pounds (350.4kg), Total: 2336.9lbs (1062kg)

- 1989 USPF Senior Nationals 1st, – SHW-Class (Las, Vegas NV)

-Squat: 903.9lbs (410.8kg), Bench: 573.2lbs (260.5kg), Deadlift: 755lbs (343kg), Total: 2232lbs (1014.5kg)

- 1989 ADFPA Nationals 1st, – SHW-Class (Wilkes barre Pa.)

-Squat 909.4lbs (413.3kg), Bench: 622.8lbs (282.7kg), Deadlift: 749.5lbs (340.6kg), Total: 2281lbs (1037.1kg)

- 1989 IPF World Championships 1st, – SHW-Class (Nova Scotia, Canada)

-Squat: 870.8lbs (395kg), Bench: 523.6lbs (238kg), Deadlift: 705lbs (320kg), Total: 2099.9 (954.5kg)

- 1990 WDFPF World Championships 1st, – SHW-Class (Meaux, France)

-Squat: 804lbs(365kg), Bench: 529lbs (240kg), Deadlift: 550lbs (250kg), Total: 1883lbs (855kg)

== Personal life ==
Hall is married to his wife Toni and they have three daughters, Renata, Briana, and Brittany. He is employed at the University of Maryland Eastern Shore, in Princess Anne Md., as the Director and Fitness Specialist of the Health and Wellness Department.

In 2013, Hall suffered a heart attack and was admitted to Nanticoke Hospital.

== Powerlifting career ==
During the mid-1970s, Hall became the all-marine Heavyweight-Powerlifting Champion several times. He was considered as one of the strongest marines in his time.

Hall arrived on the National scene with the American Drug-Free Powerlifting Association (ADFPA) in 1983. He won the 2nd place in his first Nationals at the ADFPA Nationals in Allentown, Pa. with 1862 lbs (846 kg) total while setting a National and American record in the deadlift. The following year, he took 1ST place at the 1984 ADFPA Nationals setting an American and National record in the deadlift 722 lbs (328 kg) and total 2033 lbs (924 kg). Hall officially became the first ADFPA drug-free lifter to break the 2000 lbs total barrier at a National competition.

On July 6, 1985, Hall participated in his first United States Powerlifting Federation's National Powerlifting Championships in Chicago, Illinois and took 3rd place in the Superheavyweight (SHW) division behind the great Doyle Kenady and George Hector. Hall posted a 2171.5 lbs (987 kg) total. Two weeks later, on July 20 Hall took 1st place at the 1985 ADFPA Nationals in Wilkes Barre, PA. His winning 2160 lbs (981 kg) total became the first 2100 lb total in ADFPA history. Powerlifting USA Magazine stated, "Lifting this often and doing well is quite a challenge for a big man". Hall attempted the first 600 lbs bench in ADFPA history on a fourth attempt and was good for 2300 lbs total. In November 1985, Hall competed at the ADFPA Longhorn Open/Collegiate Powerlifting competition held by Dr. Terry and Jan Todd in Austin, Texas and shocked the powerlifting world by posting the highest total in history lifted by a drug-tested lifter. A record-breaking 2303 lbs (1046.8 kg). His lifts consisted of 925 lbs (420 kg) squat w/wraps, 584 lbs (265 kg) raw bench press and a 793 lbs (360 kg) raw deadlift. He officially became the first lifter in ADFPA history and the first man to break the 2200 and 2300-pound barrier without the aid of Anabolic steroids.

In April 1986, Hall won the super heavyweight division in the ADFPA North American Powerlifting competition in Wilkes-Barre, Pa. He squatted 905 lbs missing 940 lbs twice. He totaled 2250 lbs and became the first ADFPA lifter in history to officially bench press 600 lbs (272.7 kg) drug-free. In the 1988 Boys Life Magazine, Dennis Brady, the president of the American Drug-free Powerlifting Association at that time quoted, "Mike Hall is an unusual drug-free lifter, and He’s able to compete with anyone”. Hall continued his lifting journey by winning first place at the United States Powerlifting Federation National Powerlifting (USPF) in 1986, 1987, 1989 and the American Drug Free Powerlifting Association (ADFPA) in 1986, and 1989.

In November 1986, Hall entered his first International Powerlifting Federation (IPF) World Championships in the Netherlands, the Hague. He won his first gold with a 2160 lb (981.8 kg) total. At the 1986 IPF World Championships, Hall registered the highest SHW total since IPF began drug testing in 1982.

At the 1987 IPF World Championship in Oslo, Norway, Hall took second place behind Sweden’s Lars Noren, with a 2210 lbs (1004.5) total. In addition, Hall became the first American lifter to officially squat 900 lbs (409 kg) and total 2200 lbs at a drug tested IPF World Powerlifting competition. On October 25, 1988, in San Diego California, Hall made history by competing at the first World Corporate Games and winning the Gold with a 2160 lbs (982 kg) total. In 1989, at the ADFPA Lifetime Drug-Free Nationals in Tempe, Arizona, Hall spoke to 8000 kids during a “Say No to Drugs” seminar and lifting exhibition. While squatting at the exhibition, Hall injured his hand returning the bar back in the rack. Hall placed first while posting the highest drug tested total 2336.9 lbs (1062 kg) ever lifted by an American Superheavyweight lifter during that time. At the 1989 IPF World Championships in Canada, despite serious injuries Hall won the 1989 IPF World Championships with a 2099 lbs total. Mike Lambert, editor of Powerlifting USA Magazine quoted, "Few people realized the intensity of Mike's effort to win the super heavy title at the fantastic IPF Worlds in Canada. Hall prayed, and he felt no pain until after the 705 lbs deadlift he needed was successfully completed. At the 1990 World Drug-Free Powerlifting Federation World Championships in Meaux, France, Hall took first place and set a new WDFPF world bench press of 529 lbs (240.4 kg). In 1991, Hall known as the World’s Strongest Drug-free Man retired from the lifting platform.
