= Jackie Pierce =

English footballer

Personal information
- Full name: John Warbrick Pierce
- Date of birth: 1873
- Place of birth: Preston, England
- Date of death: 18 December 1908 (aged 34–35)
- Place of death: Preston, England
- Position: Inside forward

Senior career*
Years	Team	Apps	(Gls)
1894–1901	Preston North End	74	(16)
1901–1902	Bristol Rovers		
1902	Chorley		
Total		74	(16)
- * Club domestic league appearances and goals

John Warbrick Pierce (1873 – 18 December 1908) was an English footballer who played in the Football League for Preston North End. He died of tuberculosis.
