= Ed Coan =

American powerlifter (born 1963)

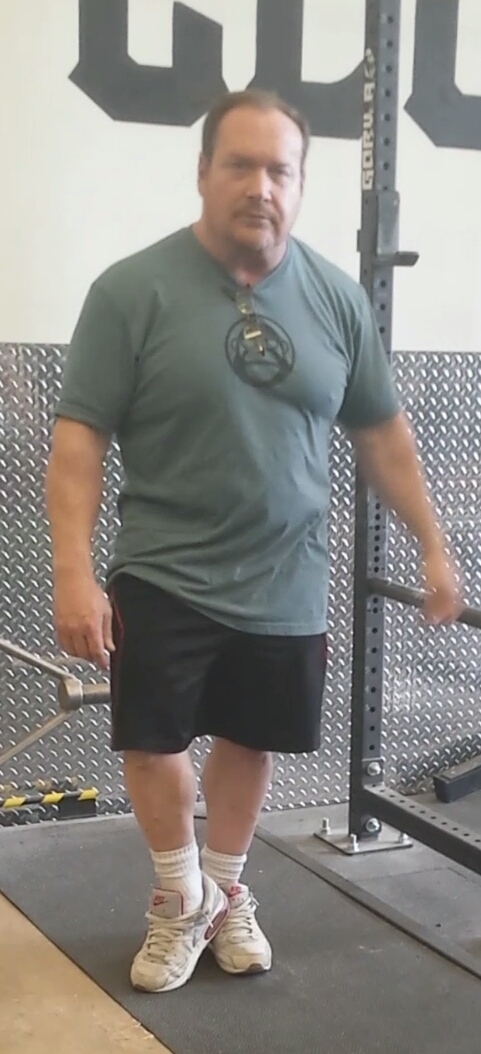
- Ed Coan in 2018
- Born: Edward Ignatius Coan; July 24, 1963 (age 63)
- Occupation: Powerlifter
- Known for: Strength athletics
- Height: 5 ft 6 in (1.68 m)

Competition record

Powerlifting

Representing United States

USPF Senior National Championships
| 1st | 1988 |
| 1st | 1989 |
| 1st | 1990 |
| 1st | 1991 |
| 1st | 1993 |
| 1st | 1994 |
| 1st | 1995 |

IPF World Championships
| 1st | 1984 |
| Disqualified | 1985 | |
| 1st | 1988 |
| Disqualified | 1989 | |
| 1st | 1993 |
| 1st | 1994 |
| 1st | 1995 |
| Disqualified | 1996 | |

USPF Mountaineer Cup
| 3rd | 1999 |
| 1st | 2000 |
| 1st | 2001 |

Edward Ignatius "Ed" Coan (born July 24, 1963) is an American powerlifter. With multiple world championships and 71 world records he is widely regarded throughout the powerlifting world as the greatest powerlifter of all time.

In 2015, he was inducted into the International Sports Hall of Fame.

== Early career ==
Coan started out as a skinny kid being picked on at school, and decided to take up bodybuilding in his basement using old iso-kinetic cord machines. He eventually moved on to an Olympic weightlifting set owned by a friend, guided by the exercise instructions in Arnold Schwarzenegger's book: Education of a Bodybuilder.

He got a membership at the Chicago Health Club and after seeing Bill Kazmaier, started powerlifting with a friend and within six months, squatted 500 lb (227 kg).

== Powerlifting career ==
During 1991 Senior Nationals, he became the lightest person to cross the 2,400 lb (1,089 kg) barrier in the powerlifting total (a sum of three lifts: squat, bench, and deadlift). In 1998 World Championships, he set an all-time powerlifting record total at 2,463 lb (1,117 kg), in the 110 kg weight class.

Coan's best total in a drug tested international competition is 2,282 lb (1,035 kg) in the 100 kg weight class at the 1994 IPF Senior World Championships in South Africa, establishing a new world record at the time. Although serving a lifetime ban from the IPF for doping, Coan is among the people still acknowledged and regarded a legend in the world of powerlifting and spends much of his time mentoring young lifters coming into the sport.

== Personal records ==
110 kg weight class, in single-ply equipment

- Squat (w/wraps) – 1,019.6 lb (462.5 kg) (1999 Senior National Championships)
- Bench press – 573.2 lb (260.0 kg) (1998 World Championships, 1999 Senior National Championships, and 2000 Senior Nationals)

→ He has done 584.2 lb (265.0 kg) during training

- Deadlift – 887.3 lb (402.5 kg) (1998 World Championships)
- Total – 2,463.6 lb (1,117.5 kg) (1,003.1 + 573.2 + 887.3 lb (455.0 + 260.0 + 402.5 kg)) (1998 World Championships)

100 kg weight class, in single-ply equipment

- Squat (w/wraps) – 964.5 lb (437.5 kg) (1987 World Championships)
- Bench press – 562.1 lb (255.0 kg) (1992 Senior National Championships)
- Deadlift – 901.0 lb (408.7 kg) (1991 Senior Nationals)
- Total – 2,405.6 lb (1,091.2 kg) (959.0 + 545.6 + 901.0 lb (435.0 + 247.5 + 408.7 kg)) (1991 Senior Nationals)

== Drug ban ==
Coan has failed drug testing through the IPF three times. He was temporarily suspended in 1985 for the use of Deca-Durabolin, an anabolic steroid.

In 1989, he was suspended due to a positive drug test.

In 1996, at the IPF Men's Open World Championships in Salzburg, Austria, he tested positive again and was issued a lifetime ban from the IPF. Because this positive drug test occurred in a competition in which he placed first, his name and results have been retroactively removed from the 1996 results. Coan is now suspended from IPF for life.

In 2016, the IPF declared that due to Coan's suspension participating in his training seminars is a violation of WADA regulations and thus prohibited.

== See also ==
- List of strongmen
- List of powerlifters
