= Widari =

Indonesian powerlifter

Widari (born in Kutai Kartanegara Regency) is an Indonesian powerlifter. She won three gold medals at the World Championships in Plzeň, Czech Republic.
