= Jesse Norris =

American powerlifter

Jesse Norris is an American powerlifter. He holds multiple world records in the 90 kilogram weight class.

== Career ==
Norris had an athletic background prior to powerlifting including both football and track and field. He started competing in the sport of powerlifting at the age of 14, with his training beginning in his 8th grade year. He was a football player in high school and states that as being his reason for getting involved in powerlifting and fitness. His brother was a football all star, but Jesse was not chosen to start on the team. He started training in order to improve himself as an athlete. Norris became one of very few powerlifters to have totaled ten times their own bodyweight.

== Achievements and accomplishments ==
766 lb(348 kg) Squat at 198 lbs (89,8 kg)

441 lb(200 kg) Bench Press at 90 kg

821 lb(373 kg) Deadlift at 90 kg

2,033 lb(924 kg) Total at 90 kg (All-time world record)
