= Taito Haara =

Finnish weightlifter

Personal information
- Nationality: Finnish
- Born: 14 September 1942 (age 82); Orimattila, Finland

Sport
- Sport: Weightlifting

Taito Haara (born 14 September 1942) is a Finnish weightlifter. He competed at the 1972 Summer Olympics and the 1976 Summer Olympics.
