= Sue Roberts (powerlifter) =

Australian powerlifter

Medal record

Women's powerlifting

Representing Australia

IPF Women's World Powerlifting Championships
Gold medal – first place	1980 Lowell	48 kg
Gold medal – first place	1981 Honolulu	52 kg
Gold medal – first place	1982 Birmingham	52 kg
Silver medal – second place	1983 Adelaide	52 kg
Silver medal – second place	1984 Santa Monica	52 kg
Bronze medal – third place	1987 Perth	52 kg

Sue Roberts (also known as Sue Jordan and Sue Jordan-Roberts) is an Australian powerlifter who won gold medals in the International Powerlifting Federation's Women's World Powerlifting Championships in 1981, 1982 and 1983.

== Achievements ==
Roberts was selected in early 1981 on the basis of having achieved a World Number 1 ranking in 1980 as one of 30 athletes to receive funds under the Australian Government's National Athlete Award Scheme. She was again selected to receive a grant at the end of 1982. Sue Roberts competed at the Perth State Titles in June 1981, lifting a World Record 165 kilos in the Deadlift and a National Record of 72.5 kilos in the Bench Press. At the 1981 Australian National Championships at Cairns, Roberts lifted a World Record 147.5 kilos. She was named Western Australian Sports Star of the Year.

She was part of the Australian team that came second at the Women's World Powerlifting Championships in the same year, winning her weight class.
