= Harold Collins (strongman) =

American strength athlete

Harold "Iron Bear" Collins
- Born: Shannon, North Carolina, United States
- Other name: "Chief Iron Bear"
- Occupations: Strongman, Powerlifting
- Height: 6 ft 2 in (1.88 m)
- Website: Iron Bear Visions

Competition record

Strongman

Representing United States

World's Strongest Man
6th	1993 World's Strongest Man
10th	1997 World's Strongest Man

America's Strongest Man
2nd	1997
3rd	1998

AFSA Full Strength Challenge
4th	1998 Las Vegas Grand Prix
3rd	1999 Austria Grand Prix

IFSA European Open
8th	1997

Powerlifting

Representing United States

USPF National Championships
3rd	1990	125 kg
1st	1991	+125 kg
1st	1992	+125 kg
2nd	1993	+125 kg

IPF World Championships
6th	1992	+125 kg
3rd	1993	+125 kg

Harold "Iron Bear" Collins is a former professional strongman and world champion Powerlifter. Collins is a member of the Tuskarora Nation of Moratoc Indians, and earned the title, "World's Strongest Native American."

== Strongman/Powerlifting ==
Collins competed in the finals of the World's Strongest Man competition twice, finishing 6th in 1993 and 10th in 1997. Collins is a 2 time USPF National Powerlifting champion, and is a 2 time IPF World Championships bench press gold medalist.

Collins holds multiple North Carolina Bench press records, including the North Carolina State Bench press record in the 275 lb. class with 601 lbs. which he pressed 6 times. He also holds the North Carolina State Bench press record in the Superheavyweight Division with a 633 lb. Bench press.

== Guinness World Records ==
Collins has set a total of 6 Guinness world records during his lifetime. His first world record was set in October 1994 by pulling 7 semi-trucks weighing a combined total of 124,400 pounds (56,400 kg).

In 1994, Collins set a world record by pulling 5 tractor-trailer cabs weighing a combined total of 86,560 pounds (39,260 kg) for 51 feet.

In 1999 Collins set his third Guinness world record by pulling a semi-truck and flatbed trailer weighing a combined total of 50,433 pounds (22,876 kg) 160 feet in 44 seconds. The event was broadcast nationally in the US on the television show Extra. In 2001, Collins set a world record by tossing a 32 pound beer keg 21 feet in the air over a wall.

Collins set a fifth Guinness world record in 2001 by restraining 2 Harley Davidson motorcycles for over 20 seconds.

Collins' sixth Guinness world record was set in 2002 by restraining 2 Dodge V8 pickup trucks at 4,500 RPM for 27 seconds.

== Personal life ==
Now retired from strength competitions, Collins raises money for charities like the March of Dimes.

Collins once owned and operated the Powerhouse Gym in Pembroke, North Carolina.

Collins runs his own website, IRON BEAR VISIONS, as well as organizing his own strongman contest, Iron Bear Strength Challenge which he created in 2009.

== Personal Records ==
- Squat – 370 kg (816 lb)
- Bench press – 280 kg (617 lb)
- Deadlift – 342.5 kg (755 lb)
- Leviathan Press (incline log press) – 110 kg (243 lb) x 20 reps (1993 World's Strongest Man) (World Record)
- Keg toss – 20 kg (44 lb) over 4.50 metres (14 ft 9 in) (1997 European Open)
- Keg toss – 15 kg (33 lb) over 6.40 metres (21 ft 0 in) (2001) (former world record)
