= Hiroyuki Isagawa =

Japanese powerlifter (born 1953)

Personal information
- Born: 22 July 1953 (age 72) Naha, USCAR (now Naha, Okinawa, Japan)
- Height: 1.55 m (5 ft 1 in)
- Weight: 59 kg (130 lb)

Sport
- Country: Japan
- Sport: Powerlifting
Medal record
Representing Japan
World Championships
Gold medal – first place	1981 Calcutta	56 kg
Bronze medal – third place	1983 Goteborg	56 kg
Silver medal – second place	1984 Dallas	56 kg
Silver medal – second place	1985 Espoo	56 kg
Gold medal – first place	1986 The Hague	56 kg
Gold medal – first place	1987 Fredrikstad	56 kg
Gold medal – first place	1988 Perth	56 kg
Gold medal – first place	1989 Sydney	56 kg
Gold medal – first place	1991 Orebro	56 kg
Bronze medal – third place	1993 Jonkoping	56 kg
Gold medal – first place	1994 Johannesburg	56 kg
Bronze medal – third place	1995 Pori	56 kg
Bronze medal – third place	1997 Prague	56 kg
Bronze medal – third place	2003 Vejle	56 kg
Bronze medal – third place	2004 Cape Town	56 kg
Bronze medal – third place	2005 Miami	56 kg
Gold medal – first place	2006 Stavanger	56 kg
Bronze medal – third place	2007 Solden	56 kg
Silver medal – second place	2008 St. Johns	56 kg
World Games
Gold medal – first place	1985 London	Light weight
Silver medal – second place	1989 Karlsruhe	Light weight

Hiroyuki Isagawa (伊差川 浩之, Isagawa Hiroyuki; born 22 July 1953) is a Japanese light weight powerlifter. He was admitted to the International Powerlifting Federation Hall of Fame in 2007.
