= Derek Pomana =

New Zealand powerlifter

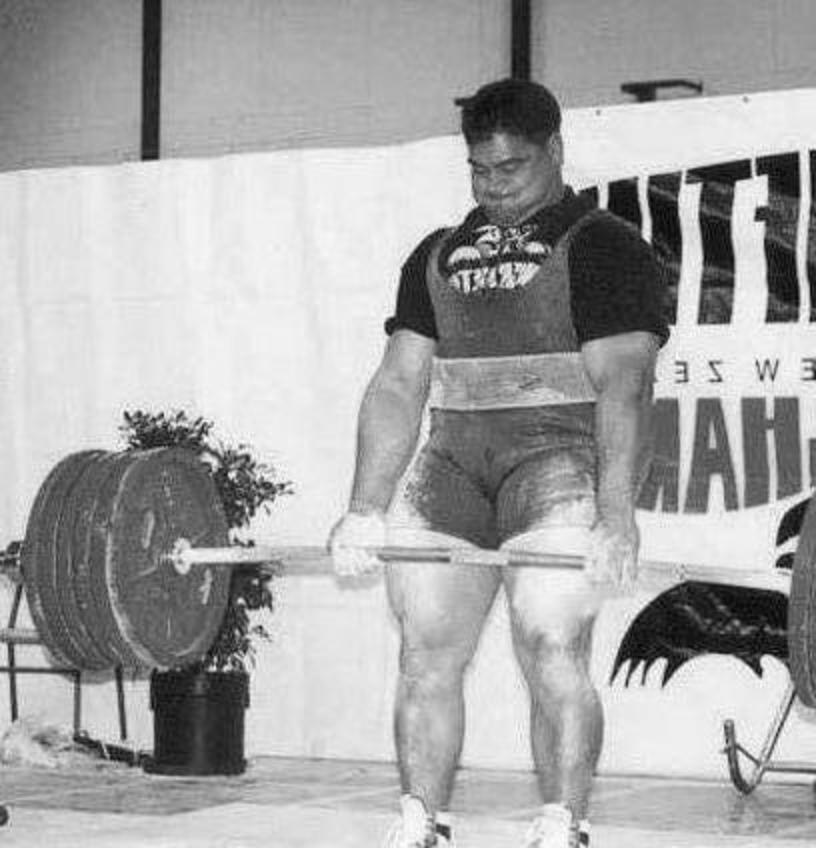

Personal information
- Full name: Derek Pomana
- Nationality: New Zealander
- Born: 1966 (age 59–60)

Sport
- Country: New Zealand
- Sport: Powerlifting

Achievements and titles
- World finals: IPF
- Highest world ranking: 1

Competition record

IPF World Championships
Silver medal – second place	1994 Johannesburg	– 110 kg
Gold medal – first place	1995 Pori	– 110 kg
Gold medal – first place	1996 Salzburg	– 110 kg
Gold medal – first place	1997 Prague	– 110 kg
Silver medal – second place	2001 Sotkamo	– 110 kg
Bronze medal – third place	2002 Trencin	– 110 kg
Silver medal – second place	2003 Vejle	– 110 kg

Derek Pomana (Paw-mah-nah) (born 1966) is a former three-time world champion powerlifter in the 110 kg division.

Pomana set a world record in 1996 at Salzburg by benchpressing 255 kg (551.6 pounds) at a bodyweight of 110 kg (242.05 pounds) which was beaten 2 minutes later. As of 2015, he holds the New Zealand record for a combined (deadlift, squat, benchpress) total of 977.5 kg, Pomana is of Māori descent.
