= Lamar Gant =

American powerlifter

- Born: 1957 (age 68–69); Flint, Michigan
- Occupation: Powerlifter
- Known for: Powerlifting
- Height: 5 ft 2 in (1.57 m)

Competition record

Powerlifting

Representing United States

IPF World Championships
Gold medal – first place	1975 Birmingham	– 56 kg
Gold medal – first place	1976 York	– 56 kg
Gold medal – first place	1977 Perth	– 56 kg
Gold medal – first place	1978 Turku	– 60 kg
Gold medal – first place	1979 Dayton	– 56 kg
Gold medal – first place	1980 Arlington	– 60 kg
Gold medal – first place	1981 Calcutta	– 60 kg
Gold medal – first place	1982 Munich	– 56 kg
Gold medal – first place	1983 Goteborg	– 56 kg
Gold medal – first place	1984 Dallas	– 56 kg
Gold medal – first place	1986 The Hague	– 60 kg
Gold medal – first place	1987 Fredrikstad	– 60 kg
Gold medal – first place	1988 Perth	– 60 kg
Gold medal – first place	1989 Sydney	– 60 kg
Gold medal – first place	1990 The Hague	– 60 kg
Silver medal – second place	1973 Harrisburg	– 56 kg

Lamar Gant (born 1957) is an American former powerlifter. He competed with idiopathic scoliosis. He was inducted into the International Powerlifting Federation Hall of Fame in 1980.

Gant set his first world record in 1974 by deadlifting 524.5 pounds (238 kg) at a bodyweight of 123 pounds (56 kg) at the Flint Olympian Games. In 1985, he became the first person in human history to deadlift five times his own bodyweight - lifting 661 pounds (300 kg) at a bodyweight of 132 pounds (60 kg). He holds the world records for deadlifting in both the 123- and 132-pound weight classes.

Best lifts overall (single ply)
Lift / Weight class	123 pounds (56 kg)	132 pounds (60 kg)
Squat	518.1 pounds 235 kg	595.2 pounds 270 kg
Bench Press	308.6 pounds 140 kg	352.7 pounds 160 kg
Deadlift	639.3 pounds 290 kg	683.4 pounds 310 kg
