= Hideaki Inaba =

Japanese powerlifter

Personal information
- Born: 1944 (age 81–82)

Sport
- Country: Japan
- Sport: Powerlifting
Medal record
Representing Japan
Open World championships
Gold medal – first place	1974 York	52 kg
Gold medal – first place	1975 Birmingham	52 kg
Gold medal – first place	1976 York	52 kg
Gold medal – first place	1977 Perth	52 kg
Gold medal – first place	1978 Turku	52 kg
Gold medal – first place	1979 Dayton	52 kg
Gold medal – first place	1980 Arlington	52 kg
Gold medal – first place	1981 Calcutta	52 kg
Gold medal – first place	1982 Munich	52 kg
Gold medal – first place	1983 Goteborg	52 kg
Silver medal – second place	1984 Dallas	52 kg
Gold medal – first place	1985 Espoo	52 kg
Gold medal – first place	1986 The Hague	52 kg
Gold medal – first place	1987 Fredrikstad	52 kg
Gold medal – first place	1988 Perth	52 kg
Gold medal – first place	1989 Sydney	52 kg
Gold medal – first place	1990 The Hague	52 kg
Gold medal – first place	1991 Orebro	52 kg
Silver medal – second place	1992 Birmingham	52 kg
Bronze medal – third place	1993 Jonkoping	52 kg
Silver medal – second place	1994 Johannesburg	52 kg
Silver medal – second place	1995 Pori	52 kg
Bronze medal – third place	1996 Salzburg	52 kg
Silver medal – second place	1997 Prague	52 kg
Silver medal – second place	1998 Cherkasy	52 kg
Bronze medal – third place	2000 Akita	52 kg
Masters 2 World championships
Gold medal – first place	1994 Bratislava	56 kg
Gold medal – first place	1995 Copenhagen	52 kg
Gold medal – first place	1996 Delhi	56 kg
Gold medal – first place	1997 Szégesfehérvár	56 kg
Gold medal – first place	1998 Villa Maria Cordoba	56 kg
Gold medal – first place	1999 Sun City	56 kg
Gold medal – first place	2000 Usti Nad Labem	56 kg
Gold medal – first place	2001 Moose Jaw	56 kg
Gold medal – first place	2002 Villa de Maria	56 kg
Gold medal – first place	2003 Regina	56 kg

Hideaki Inaba (因幡 英昭, Inaba Hideaki) is a Japanese former powerlifter who competed internationally as a light weight. He set four new world records at the 1974 World Powerlifting Championships. He was admitted to the International Powerlifting Federation Hall of Fame in 1979. He set another world record at the Pan Am International Powerlifting Championships in 1984.
