= Shane Hamman =

American weightlifter (born 1972)

Personal information
- Born: Shane Hamman; June 20, 1972 (age 54) Oklahoma City, Oklahoma, United States
- Height: 5 ft 9 in (1.75 m)
Medal record
Men's Weightlifting
Representing the United States
Pan American Games
Gold medal – first place	1999 Winnipeg	+ 105 kg
Powerlifting
Representing the United States
IPF World Powerlifting Championships
3rd	1994	+125kg
2nd	1995	+125kg
USPF National Powerlifting Championships
3rd	1992	+125kg
1st	1993	+125kg
2nd	1994	+125kg
1st	1995	+125kg
1st	1996	+125kg

Shane Hamman (born June 20, 1972) is an American Olympic weightlifter and powerlifter.

== Early years ==
Shane Hamman was born in Oklahoma City, Oklahoma, and brought up in Mustang, Oklahoma. Hamman began to play soccer at the age of 6 until he was 12 years old. In his freshman year of high school, Hamman began football and was a standout for two years on the freshman and varsity squads. He also wrestled his junior year.

Hamman grew strong lifting large pallets of produce for his father's fruit market. During high school, he had broken several teenage records. He trained as a powerlifter after high school, but after seeing the 1996 Summer Olympics, he decided to switch his career to Olympic-style weightlifting.

== Olympic weightlifting/Powerlifting ==
Shane began his career as a powerlifter, competing for the International Powerlifting Federation. He competed in the IPF World Championships in 1994 & 1995, finished third and second respectively.

His greatest equipped squat was 457.5 kg at the USPF National Championships on March 9, 1996, which stood as the world record until Andrey Konovalov squatted 460 kg on November 4, 2012.

Hamman is sometimes called the strongest man in America. He won all 9 American Senior National Championship that he competed in (1997-2005). He holds every American weightlifting record in his class.

He competed in the 2000 Summer Olympics and finished 10th. In the qualifying for the Olympics, during the 2003 World Championships, on his final lift he single-handedly secured three spots for athletes from the U.S. in the 2004 Summer Olympics. In the Olympics, he finished 7th in his weight category, setting a new American record with his total of 430 kg and his clean and jerk of 237.5 kg.

Aside from his weightlifting prowess, Hamman also plays basketball and golf. Despite his 350 pounds (160 kilograms) frame, he can hit a golf ball 350 yards (320 m), do a standing back flip, and leap vertically three feet (0.9 m).

Hamman has retired from Olympic weightlifting, and sometimes appears as an announcer in events like the Olympics in 2008 and 2016 for NBC.

Hamman is now focusing on helping others. He gives speeches at various high schools about his career and what it took to get Olympian status. Hamman also visits high schools to promote "Rachel's Challenge", a program for which he is a spokesperson.
