= Kirk Karwoski =

American world champion powerlifter

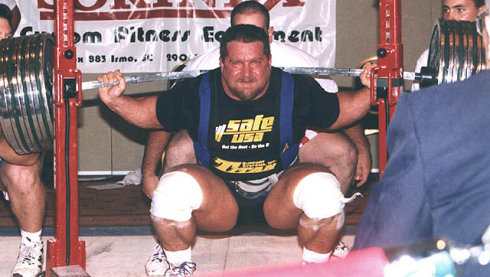
- Karwoski squatting over 1,000 pounds.
- Occupation: Powerlifter
- Known for: 6 time IPF World Powerlifting champion
- Height: 5 ft 7 in (1.70 m)

Competition record

Powerlifting

Representing United States

IPF World Powerlifting Championships
2nd	1990	+125kg
1st	1991	125kg
1st	1992	125kg
1st	1993	125kg
1st	1994	110kg
1st	1995	125kg
1st	1996	125kg

USPF National Powerlifting Championships
3rd	1988	110kg
3rd	1989	110kg
1st	1990	+125kg
1st	1991	125kg
1st	1992	125kg
1st	1993	125kg
1st	1994	110kg
1st	1995	125kg
1st	1996	125kg

IPF Junior World Championships
3rd	1987	125kg
1st	1989	110kg

Kirk Karwoski is an American world champion powerlifter. Kirk is a 7 time USPF National Powerlifting Champion, a 6 time IPF World Powerlifting Champion and an IPF Junior World Powerlifting Champion.

Kirk is widely considered one of the greatest squatters in the history of powerlifting. He currently holds the International Powerlifting Federation equipped world record in the squat of 455 kg.(1,003 lbs.) in the 125 kg. weight class which was set in 1995. Leading up to that competition he squatted that 1000 lbs. for 2 reps in training.

Kirk squatted 800 pounds for five reps, an athletic feat considered to be the most impressive set of all time by Marty Gallagher of the publication Iron History.
