= Larry Kidney =

American powerlifter (1939–2016)

- Born: Larry Kidney; August 29, 1939; Topeka, Kansas, U.S.
- Died: February 25, 2016 (aged 76)
- Occupations: Strongman, powerlifting
- Height: 183 cm (6 ft 0 in)

Larry Kidney (August 29, 1939 – February 25, 2016) was an American powerlifter. He placed 6th in the 1980 World's Strongest Man Contest held at the Playboy Club in Vernon, New Jersey. and has held several state, national, and world records in the sport of Powerlifting.

Kidney was inducted to the California Powerlifting Hall of Fame in 2004 and holds several California Powerlifting Records.

Kidney died on February 25, 2016, at the age of 76.
