= Doug Young (powerlifter) =

American powerlifter (1944–2005)

- Born: Richard Douglas Young; August 21, 1944
- Died: October 7, 2005 (aged 61); Abilene, Texas, U.S.
- Occupation: Powerlifter
- Known for: IPF World Powerlifting Champion
- Height: 5 ft 11 in (1.80 m)

Competition record

Powerlifting

Representing United States

IPF World Powerlifting Championships
1st	1975	110kg
1st	1976	110kg
1st	1977	110kg

AAU US National Powerlifting Championships
3rd	1974	110kg
1st	1975	110kg
1st	1976	110kg
1st	1977	110kg

USPF National Powerlifting Championships
6th	1979	125kg

Doug Young (August 21, 1944 – October 7, 2005) was an American national and world powerlifting champion multiple times throughout his career while competing in the 242 lb. and 275 lb. weight classes.

Doug won his third straight world championship title at the 1977 IPF world championships. He posted a 1,956 pound total (699 lb. squat, 545 lb. bench press, and 710 lb. deadlift) while sustaining three broken ribs. Doug is credited with benching 612 pounds in 1978 while wearing just a T-shirt.

American football offensive guard Bob Young was his older brother.

== Death ==
On October 7, 2005, in Abilene, Texas, Doug suffered a massive heart attack and died instantly.

== Personal records ==
- Squat - 722 pounds (327 kg)
- Bench press - 612 pounds (278 kg)
- Deadlift - 805 pounds (365 kg)
- Total - 2,072 pounds (940 kg)
