= Larry Pacifico =

American powerlifter (born 1946)

- Born: Larry Pacifico; January 17, 1946 (age 79)
- Other names: "Mr. Powerlifting"
- Occupation: Powerlifting
- Height: 5 ft 6 in (1.68 m)

Competition record

Powerlifting

Representing United States

AAU World Powerlifting Championships
1st	1971	90kg
1st	1972	110kg

IPF World Powerlifting Championships
1st	1973	110kg
1st	1974	100kg
1st	1975	100kg
1st	1976	90kg
1st	1977	100kg
1st	1978	100kg
1st	1979	100kg

AAU US National Powerlifting Championships
1st	1970	90kg
1st	1971	90kg
1st	1975	100kg
1st	1976	90kg
1st	1977	100kg

USPF National Powerlifting Championships
1st	1979	100kg
2nd	1984	100kg

Larry Pacifico (born January 17, 1946) is an American former world champion powerlifter.

Larry won nine straight IPF World Powerlifting Championships from 1971–1979. Larry won a total of 102 competitions and set 54 World Records during his powerlifting career.

Larry is widely regarded as one of the greatest powerlifters of all time, and goes by the nickname "Mr. Powerlifting".

Three-time World's Strongest Man winner and two-time IPF world champion Bill Kazmaier once stated, "The first time I went to a powerlifting meet and saw Larry, I think he was probably six or seven on his World Championships and he was pretty much—how would you say?—a god in powerlifting. He could go to any class that he wanted to. He could pretty much lift whatever weight on the day he wanted to." Four-time IPF powerlifting champion and 1979 World's Strongest Man winner Don Reinhoudt said of Larry, "I look at Larry, an idol to all of us here—nine time champion and Larry will always be the legend of all time to us."

Larry was inducted into the York Barbell Hall of Fame on June 28, 1998. Larry currently owns his own gym and is a personal trainer in Dayton, Ohio.

== Best competition lifts ==
- Squat : 832 pounds
- Bench press : 592 pounds (no bench shirt)
- Deadlift : 771 pounds
- Total : 2,061 pounds

== Best exhibition lifts ==
- Squat : 885 pounds
- Bench press : 611 pounds
- Deadlift : 815 pounds
- Push press : 440 pounds
- Standing press : 315 pounds in 1968
- Snatch: 270 pounds in 1968
- Clean and Jerk : 320 pounds in 1968
