= Dave Jacoby (powerlifter) =

American powerlifter

Dave Jacoby (born in East Sparta, Ohio) is an American powerlifter. He won five International Powerlifting Federation World Championships in 1984, 1985, 1987, 1988 and 1992.

== IPF Men's World Championships Men -110kg ==
1984	Dallas (USA)	Dave Jacoby (USA)
1985	Espoo (FIN)	Dave Jacoby (USA)
1987	Fredrikstad (NOR)	Dave Jacoby (USA)
1988	Perth (AUS)	Dave Jacoby (USA)

== Other Championships ==
1990	USPF Men's US Championships	2nd Place	Hollywood, Florida
1991	USPF Men's US Championships	1st Place	Dallas, Texas
1992	IPF Senior World Championships	1st Place	Birmingham, England
