= Doyle Kenady =

American powerlifter and strongman

Personal information
- Born: 29 August 1948 United States
- Died: 3 February 1999 (aged 50)
- Occupation(s): Powerlifter, Strongman
- Height: 5 ft 10 in (178 cm)
Medal record
Representing United States
Strongman
World's Strongest Man
7th	1983 Christchurch
Powerlifting
World Games
Gold medal – first place	1981 Santa Clara	+110kg
IPF World Powerlifting Championships
2nd	1974	+110kg
1st	1978	+110kg
1st	1980	+110kg
AAU US National Powerlifting Championships
3rd	1975	+110kg
2nd	1976	+110kg
1st	1978	+125kg
USPF National Powerlifting Championships
1st	1980	+110kg
2nd	1981	+110kg
2nd	1983	+125kg
2nd	1985	+125kg

Doyle Kenady (29 August 1948 – 3 February 1999) was a world champion powerlifter and strongman competitor from the United States. Doyle was best known for winning the IPF World Powerlifting Championships in 1978 and 1980 in the +110 kg weight class. Doyle Kenady broke the world record in the deadlift at the 1986 Budweiser World Recorder Breakers Meet Deadlifting a 903-pound World Record on April 6, 1986, in a deadlift suit. Doyle competed in the 1983 World's Strongest Man contest in Christchurch, New Zealand, finishing in 7th place overall.
