= List of IPF world champions in powerlifting (classic) =

This is a list of IPF world championships medalists in classic powerlifting.

For world champions associated with other federations see the articles for those federations for more information.

The primary difference between IPF Classic (Raw) and IPF Equipped powerlifting is the use of supportive gear. Classic allows only a belt, knee sleeves, and wrist wraps, while Equipped allows specialized, single-ply squat/deadlift suits and bench shirts that provide significant support and increase maximum weight lifted.

== Women ==
=== -47 kg ===
Meet	Gold	Silver	Bronze
2012 (Sweden) Stockholm	(Chinese Taipei) Chen Wei-ling	(Russia) Olga Golubeva	(Australia) Mary Macken
2013 (Russia) Suzdal	(Russia) Olga Golubeva	(Japan) Rie Kani	(Ukraine) Nataliia Kulinenko
2014 (South Africa) Potchefstroom	(Russia) Olga Golubeva	(Japan) Rie Kani	(Canada) Steph Puddicome
2015 (Finland) Salo	(Chinese Taipei) Chen Wei-ling	(Belarus) Aleksandra Otchenashko	(Canada) Steph Puddicome
2016 (United States) Killeen	(Puerto Rico) Maria Luisa Vasquez	(United States) Heather Connor	(Finland) Hanna Rantala
2017 (Belarus) Minsk	(United States) Heather Connor	(Sweden) Stina Akemalm	(Sweden) Kristine Almroth
2018 (Canada) Calgary	(Sweden) Stina Akemalm	(Finland) Hanna Rantala	(Canada) Rhonda Wong
2019 (Sweden) Helsingborg	(United States) Heather Connor	(France) Noemie Allabert	(Canada) Simone Lai
2020 Cancelled			
2021 (Sweden) Halmstad	(France) Tiffany Chapon	(Canada) Simone Lai	(Kazakhstan) Veronika Broner
2022 (South Africa) Sun City	(France) Tiffany Chapon	(United States) Heather Connor	(Canada) Simone Lai
2023 (Malta) Valletta	(France) Tiffany Chapon	(United States) Jessica Espinal	(United States) Heather Connor
2024 (Lithuania) Druskininkai	(France) Tiffany Chapon	(United States) Jessica Espinal	(Canada) Aurelie Nguyen
2025 (Germany) Chemnitz	(United States) Heather Connor	(France) Tiffany Chapon	(Australia) Vicky Kijumnuayporn
2026 (Lithuania) Druskininkai	(France) Tiffany Chapon	(Canada) Amelie Picher-Plante	(United States) Leanne Le

=== -52 kg ===
Meet	Gold	Silver	Bronze
2012 (Sweden) Stockholm	(Russia) Ana Komalaeva	(United States) Suzanne Hartwig-Gary	(Hungary) Magdolna Petroczki
2013 (Russia) Suzdal	(Russia) Ana Komalaeva	(Kazakhstan) Venera Yakupova	(United States) Suzanne Hartwig-Gary
2014 (South Africa) Potchefstroom	(Sweden) Sofia Loft	(Sweden) Miia Liimatainen Grandas	(Ecuador) Vilma Ochoa Vargas
2015 (Finland) Salo	(Sweden) Sofia Loft	(Russia) Olga Golubeva	(Hungary) Magdolna Petroczki
2016 (United States) Killeen	(Sweden) Sofia Loft	(Russia) Olga Golubeva	(Australia) Elizabeth Craven
2017 (Belarus) Minsk	(United States) Marisa Inda	(Australia) Elizabeth Craven	(United Kingdom) Joy Nnamani
2018 (Canada) Calgary	(United Kingdom) Joy Nnamani	(United States) Marisa Inda	(Russia) Olga Golubeva
2019 (Sweden) Helsingborg	(United Kingdom) Joy Nnamani	(United States) Marisa Inda	(Russia) Olga Golubeva
2020 Cancelled			
2021 (Sweden) Halmstad	(France) Noémie Allabert	(France) Shizuka Rico	(United States Virgin Islands) Andrea Riley
2022 (South Africa) Sun City	(France) Noémie Allabert	(Netherlands) Pleun Dekkers	(Canada) Stef Kean
2023 (Malta) Valletta	(New Zealand) Evie Corrigan	(France) Noémie Allabert	(New Zealand) Megan-Li Smith
2024 (Lithuania) Druskininkai	(New Zealand) Evie Corrigan	(New Zealand) Megan-Li Smith	(Netherlands) Pleun Dekkers
2025 (Germany) Chemnitz	(New Zealand) Evie Corrigan	(New Zealand) Megan-Li Smith	(Netherlands) Pleun Dekkers

=== -57 kg ===
Meet	Gold	Silver	Bronze
2012 (Sweden) Stockholm	(Chinese Taipei) Hui-Chun Wu	(Russia) Yulia Vaavilova	(Sweden) Helen Engberg
2013 (Russia) Suzdal	(Russia) Anna Ryzhkova	(Chinese Taipei) Hui-Chun Wu	(Finland) Maria Lindberg
2014 (South Africa) Potchefstroom	(Russia) Inna Filimonova	(Ecuador) Rosa Castro	(Ukraine) Vita Abdulina
2015 (Finland) Salo	(Russia) Inna Filimonova	(Chinese Taipei) Hui-Chun Wu	(Canada) Maria Htee
2016 (United States) Killeen	(Russia) Inna Filimonova	(Chinese Taipei) Hui-Chun Wu	(Canada) Jessica Benedetto
2017 (Belarus) Minsk	(United States) Jennifer Millican	(Canada) Maria Htee	(Ecuador) Kenia Monserrate
2018 (Canada) Calgary	(United States) Jennifer Millican	(Ecuador) Kenia Monserrate	(Russia) Inna Filimonova
2019 (Sweden) Helsingborg	(Canada) Maria Htee	(United States) Meghan Scanlon	(United Kingdom) Bobbie Butters
2020 Cancelled			
2021 (Sweden) Halmstad	(United Kingdom) Joy Nnamani	(Canada) Maria Htee	(United Kingdom) Bobbie Butters
2022 (South Africa) Sun City	(United Kingdom) Joy Nnamani	(France) Jade Jacob	(United Kingdom) Bobbie Butters
2023 (Malta) Valletta	(United States) Natalie Richards	(France) Jade Jacob	(Spain) Maiara da Silva Dias
2024 (Lithuania) Druskininkai	(France) Jade Jacob	(United Kingdom) Bobbie Butters	(France) Sovannphaktra Pal
2025 (Germany) Chemnitz	(Italy) Sara Naldi	(France) Jade Jacob	(United Kingdom) Joy Nnamani

=== -63 kg ===
Meet	Gold	Silver	Bronze
2012 (Sweden) Stockholm	(United States) Kimberly Walford	(United States) Jennifer Thompson	(Russia) Landish Gavina
2013 (Russia) Suzdal	(United States) Kimberly Walford	(Russia) Inna Filimonova	(Finland) Anni Vuohijoki
2014 (South Africa) Potchefstroom	(United States) Jennifer Thompson	(Sweden) Jenny Adolfsson	(Brazil) Cicera Tavares
2015 (Finland) Salo	(United States) Jennifer Thompson	(Sweden) Jenny Adolfsson	(Brazil) Cicera Tavares
2016 (United States) Killeen	(United States) Jennifer Thompson	(Slovakia) Ivana Horna	(Sweden) Jenny Adolfsson
2017 (Belarus) Minsk	(Slovakia) Ivana Horna	(Russia) Maria Dubenskaya	(Denmark) Tanja Stenholdt Olsen
2018 (Canada) Calgary	(United States) Jennifer Thompson	(United States) Samantha Calhoun	(Canada) Maria Htee
2019 (Sweden) Helsingborg	(Italy) Carola Garra	(United States) Samantha Calhoun	(France) Prescillia Bavoil
2020 Cancelled			
2021 (Sweden) Halmstad	(France) Prescillia Bavoil	(Netherlands) Iris Scholten	(Slovakia) Ivana Horna
2022 (South Africa) Sun City	(United States) Meghan Scanlon	(Italy) Chiara Bernardi	(Netherlands) Iris Scholten
2023 (Malta) Valletta	(Italy) Carola Garra	(United States) Meghan Scanlon	(Italy) Chiara Bernardi
2024 (Lithuania) Druskininkai	(United States) Meghan Scanlon	(Italy) Chiara Bernardi	(Italy) Sara Naldi
2025 (Germany) Chemnitz	(Sweden) Alba Boström	(Italy) Chiara Bernardi	(United States) Meghan Scanlon

=== -69 kg ===
Meet	Gold	Silver	Bronze
2021 (Sweden) Halmstad	(United States Virgin Islands) Chandler Babb	(Norway) Marte Kjenner	(Italy) Sara Mazzantini
2022 (South Africa) Sun City	(United States Virgin Islands) Chandler Babb	(Norway) Marte Kjenner	(Slovakia) Ivana Horna
2023 (Malta) Valletta	(France) Prescillia Bavoil	(Norway) Marte Kjenner	(France) Clara Peyraud
2024 (Lithuania) Druskininkai	(Italy) Carola Garra	(France) Prescillia Bavoil	(Norway) Marte Kjenner

=== -72 kg ===
Meet	Gold	Silver	Bronze
2012 (Sweden) Stockholm	(Finland) Johanna Kankus	(Poland) Marzena Piter	(Russia) Tatiana Zubkova
2013 (Russia) Suzdal	(United States) Sebrina Davis	(Kazakhstan) Ekatterina Kryukova	(Finland) Johanna Kankus
2014 (South Africa) Potchefstroom	(United States) Kimberly Walford	(Brazil) Ana Castellain	(Finland) Johanna Kankus
2015 (Finland) Salo	(United States) Kimberly Walford	(Papua New Guinea) Linda Pulsan	(Sweden) Isabella von Weissenberg
2016 (United States) Killeen	(United States) Kimberly Walford	(Sweden) Isabella von Weissenberg	(Canada) Rhaea Stinn
2017 (Belarus) Minsk	(United States) Kimberly Walford	(Brazil) Ana Castellain	(Sweden) Isabella von Weissenberg
2018 (Canada) Calgary	(Brazil) Ana Castellain	(Sweden) Annika Zelander	(Canada) Rhaea Stinn
2019 (Sweden) Helsingborg	(United States Virgin Islands) Kimberly Walford	(Canada) Jessica Buettner	(Sweden) Isabella von Weissenberg

=== -76 kg ===
Meet	Gold	Silver	Bronze
2021 (Sweden) Halmstad	(Canada) Jessica Buettner	(Italy) Francesca Parrello	(Philippines) Joyce Gail Reboton
2022 (South Africa) Sun City	(Canada) Jessica Buettner	(Poland) Agata Sitko	(United States Virgin Islands) Kimberly Walford
2023 (Malta) Valletta	(New Zealand) Karlina Tongotea	(Poland) Agata Sitko	(Canada) Jessica Buettner
2024 (Lithuania) Druskininkai	(Poland) Agata Sitko	(New Zealand) Karlina Tongotea	(United States) Cranon Wolford

=== -84 kg ===
Meet	Gold	Silver	Bronze
2012 (Sweden) Stockholm	(Netherlands) Ielja Strik	(Russia) Evgenia Dukacheva	(Sweden) Josephine Bark
2013 (Russia) Suzdal	(Netherlands) Ielja Strik	(Russia) Evgenia Dukacheva	(Poland) Marzena Piter
2014 (South Africa) Potchefstroom	(Netherlands) Ielja Strik	(Russia) Valeria Timoshchuk	(Poland) Marzena Piter
2015 (Finland) Salo	(Netherlands) Ielja Strik	(Belarus) Sniazhana Zubko	(United States) Sebrina Davis
2016 (United States) Killeen	(Brazil) Ana Castellain	(Netherlands) Ielja Strik	(Russia) Valeria Timoshchuk
2017 (Belarus) Minsk	(Netherlands) Ielja Strik	(Canada) Sara Cowan	(Belarus) Sniazhana Zubko
2018 (Canada) Calgary	(United States) Daniella Melo	(Belarus) Sniazhana Zubko	(Netherlands) Ielja Strik
2019 (Sweden) Helsingborg	(United States) Amanda Lawrence	(United States) Daniella Melo	(Netherlands) Ielja Strik
2020 Cancelled			
2021 (Sweden) Halmstad	(United States Virgin Islands) Amanda Lawrence	(Russia) Angelina Elovikova	(Iceland) Kristín Þórhallsdóttir
2022 (South Africa) Sun City	(United States) Amanda Lawrence	(Iceland) Kristín Þórhallsdóttir	(Canada) Danielle Philibert
2023 (Malta) Valletta	(United States) Amanda Lawrence	(Iceland) Kristín Þórhallsdóttir	(United Kingdom) Ziana Azariah
2024 (Lithuania) Druskininkai	(United States) Amanda Lawrence	(United Kingdom) Ziana Azariah	(Canada) Danielle Philibert

=== 84+ kg ===
Meet	Gold	Silver	Bronze
2012 (Sweden) Stockholm	(New Zealand) Sonia Manaena	(Sweden) Jenny Sellen	(Poland) Magdalena Bialek
2013 (Russia) Suzdal	(New Zealand) Sonia Manaena	(United States) Molly O'Rourke	(Chinese Taipei) Yun-Fang Su
2014 (South Africa) Potchefstroom	(United States) Bonica Brown	(Chinese Taipei) Fang-Yun Su	(New Zealand) Sonia Manaena
2015 (Finland) Salo	(United States) Bonica Brown	(Sweden) Emelie Pettersson	(Chinese Taipei) Fang-Yun Su
2016 (United States) Killeen	(United States) Bonica Brown	(Canada) Hailey Kostynuik	(Chinese Taipei) Fang-Yun Su
2017 (Belarus) Minsk	(United States) Bonica Brown	(Sweden) Emelie Pettersson	(Canada) Hailey Kostynuik
2018 (Canada) Calgary	(United States) Bonica Brown	(New Zealand) Theresa Simanu	(Canada) Hailey Kostynuik
2019 (Sweden) Helsingborg	(United States) Bonica Brown	(Canada) Brittany Schlater	(France) Amélie Mierger
2020 Cancelled			
2021 (Sweden) Halmstad	(Canada) Brittany Schlater	(Sweden) Emelie Leach	(France) Amélie Mierger
2022 (South Africa) Sun City	(United States) Bonica Brown	(Sweden) Emelie Leach	(France) Amélie Mierger
2023 (Malta) Valletta	(Canada) Brittany Schlater	(Belgium) Sonita Kyen Muluh	(New Zealand) Jewel Tasi
2024 (Lithuania) Druskininkai	(Belgium) Sonita Kyen Muluh	(Canada) Brittany Schlater	(United States) Alexis Jones

== Men ==
=== -59 kg ===
Meet	Gold	Silver	Bronze
2012 (Sweden) Stockholm	(Russia) Sergey Fedosienko	(Poland) Dariusz Wszoła	(United States) Eric Kupperstein
2013 (Russia) Suzdal	(Poland) Dariusz Wszoła	(United States) Eric Kupperstein	(Japan) Takaaki Mizuno
2014 (South Africa) Potchefstroom	(Russia) Sergey Fedosienko	(Poland) Dariusz Wszoła	(Ecuador) Franklin León
2015 (Finland) Salo	(Russia) Sergey Fedosienko	(Russia) Alexander Kolbin	(Poland) Dariusz Wszoła
2016 (United States) Killeen	(Russia) Sergey Fedosienko	(Ecuador) Franklin León	(Poland) Dariusz Wszoła
2017 (Belarus) Minsk	(Russia) Sergey Fedosienko	(Ecuador) Franklin León	(Poland) Dariusz Wszoła
2018 (Canada) Calgary	(Russia) Sergey Fedosienko	(Ecuador) Franklin León	(Russia) Evgeniy Mukhomedyanov
2019 (Sweden) Helsingborg	(Russia) Sergey Fedosienko	(Ecuador) Franklin León	(Japan) Ayumi Hisatsune
2020 Cancelled			
2021 (Sweden) Halmstad	(Russia) Sergey Fedosienko	(Russia) Evgeniy Mukhomedyanov	None rewarded.
2022 (South Africa) Sun City	(France) Antoine Garcia	(Japan) Takaharu Ebihara	(Iran) Mehrdad Zafari
2023 (Malta) Valletta	(United States) Wascar Carpio	(Spain) Iván Campano Díaz	(Ecuador) Franklin León
2024 (Lithuania) Druskininkai	(United States) Wascar Carpio	(France) Antoine Garcia	(Spain) Iván Campano Díaz
2025 (Germany) Chemnitz	(Spain) Iván Campano Díaz	(France) Antoine Garcia	(United States Virgin Islands) Kwaku Nyarko
2026 (Lithuania) Druskininkai	(Spain) Iván Campano Díaz	(United States) Michael Slabic	(France) Antoine Garcia

=== -66 kg ===
Meet	Gold	Silver	Bronze
2012 (Sweden) Stockholm	(Chinese Taipei) Hsieh Tsung-ting	(Japan) Yusuke Inoue	(Russia) Mikhail Andryukhin
2013 (Russia) Suzdal	(Russia) Sergey Skochek	(Ukraine) Suradzh Chebotar	(Finland) Antti Savolainen
2014 (South Africa) Potchefstroom	(Russia) Mikhail Andryukhin	(Chinese Taipei) Hsieh Tsung-ting	(Finland) Antti Savolainen
2015 (Finland) Salo	(Finland) Antti Savolainen	(Chinese Taipei) Hsieh Tsung-ting	(Canada) Stephen Cascioli
2016 (United States) Killeen	(Russia) Sergey Gladkikh	(United States) Keith McHoney	(Chinese Taipei) Hsieh Tsung-ting
2017 (Belarus) Minsk	(Russia) Sergey Gladkikh	(Canada) Stephen Cascioli	(Russia) Alexander Kolbin
2018 (Canada) Calgary	(United States) Charles Okpoko	(Russia) Sergey Gladkikh	(Finland) Antti Savolainen
2019 (Sweden) Helsingborg	(United States) Charles Okpoko	(Chinese Taipei) Hsieh Tsung-ting	(Russia) Sergey Gladkikh
2020 Cancelled			
2021 (Sweden) Halmstad	(France) Panagiotis Tarinidis	(Russia) Sergey Gladkikh	(Sweden) Eddie Berglund
2022 (South Africa) Sun City	(Sweden) Eddie Berglund	(United States) Jonathan Garcia	(Japan) Kyota Ushiyama
2023 (Malta) Valletta	(France) Panagiotis Tarinidis	(United States) Brian Le	(Japan) Kyota Ushiyama
2024 (Lithuania) Druskininkai	(Thailand) Kasemsand Senumong	(United States) Jonathan Garcia	(France) Panagiotis Tarinidis
2025 (Germany) Chemnitz	(Norway) Kjell Egil Bakkelund	(United States) Avery Jackson	(Mexico) Santos Jimenez

=== -74 kg ===
Meet	Gold	Silver	Bronze
2012 (Sweden) Stockholm	(Russia) Alexey Bakhirev	(Finland) Sami Nieminen	(Sweden) Per Berglund
2013 (Russia) Suzdal	(Belarus) Aliaksandr Hrynkevich-Sudnik	(Chinese Taipei) Lung-Hsin Huang	(Sweden) Per Berglund
2014 (South Africa) Potchefstroom	(Belarus) Aliaksandr Hrynkevich-Sudnik	(France) Hassan El Belghiti	(South Africa) Harry Shomalistos
2015 (Finland) Salo	(Belarus) Aliaksandr Hrynkevich-Sudnik	(France) Hassan El Belghiti	(France) Adrien Poinson
2016 (United States) Killeen	(Belarus) Aliaksandr Hrynkevich-Sudnik	(United States) Taylor Atwood	(Kazakhstan) Yakov Ionin
2017 (Belarus) Minsk	(Norway) Kjell Egil Bakkelund	(United States) Taylor Atwood	(Kazakhstan) Yakov Ionin
2018 (Canada) Calgary	(United States) Taylor Atwood	(Singapore) Clinton Lee	(Japan) Yoshihiro Higa
2019 (Sweden) Helsingborg	(United States) Taylor Atwood	(Norway) Kjell Egil Bakkelund	(Russia) Konstantin Dunin
2020 Cancelled			
2021 (Sweden) Halmstad	(Sweden) Alexander Eriksson	(France) Paul Rembauville	(Kazakhstan) Yakov Ionin
2022 (South Africa) Sun City	(United States) Taylor Atwood	(France) Paul Rembauville	(Germany) Joshua Wright
2023 (Malta) Valletta	(Sweden) Carl Johansson	(New Zealand) Timothy Monigatti	(United States) Taylor Atwood
2024 (Lithuania) Druskininkai	(United States) Austin Perkins	(Norway) Kjell Egil Bakkelund	(New Zealand) Timothy Monigatti
2025 (Germany) Chemnitz	(United States) Austin Perkins	(Chinese Taipei) Chun-Chia Fan	(Germany) Joshua Wright

=== -83 kg ===
Meet	Gold	Silver	Bronze
2012 (Sweden) Stockholm	(Kazakhstan) Davranbek Turakhanov	(Russia) Alexey Kuzmin	(United States) Alex Tertitski
2013 (Russia) Suzdal	(Russia) Alexey Kuzmin	(Kazakhstan) Davranbek Turakhanov	(France) Romain Picot-Guéraud
2014 (South Africa) Potchefstroom	(Ecuador) Jose Castillo	(Russia) Alexey Kuzmin	(United States) Derek Gove
2015 (Finland) Salo	(New Zealand) Brett Gibbs	(United States) Artyom Zaytsev	(Finland) Mikko Ronkainen
2016 (United States) Killeen	(United States) John Haack	(New Zealand) Brett Gibbs	(United Kingdom) Owen Hubbard
2017 (Belarus) Minsk	(Kazakhstan) Ulan Anuar	(New Zealand) Brett Gibbs	(Russia) Alexey Kuzmin
2018 (Canada) Calgary	(New Zealand) Brett Gibbs	(United States) Russel Orhii	(United Kingdom) Owen Hubbard
2019 (Sweden) Helsingborg	(United States) Russel Orhii	(New Zealand) Brett Gibbs	(Algeria) Fatah Toubal
2020 Cancelled			
2021 (Sweden) Halmstad	(United States Virgin Islands) Russel Orhii	(France) Yanis Bouchou	(Italy) Emilio Cotti Cometti
2022 (South Africa) Sun City	(United States) Delaney Wallace	(United Kingdom) Jurins Kengamu	(Hungary) Enahoro Asein
2023 (Malta) Valletta	(United States) Delaney Wallace	(Hungary) Enahoro Asein	(Canada) Nick Manders
2024 (Lithuania) Druskininkai	(United Kingdom) Jurins Kengamu	(United States) Russel Orhii	(Hungary) Enahoro Asein
2025 (Germany) Chemnitz	(United States) Joseph Borenstein	(United Kingdom) Jurins Kengamu	(United Kingdom) Ade Omisakin

=== -93 kg ===
Meet	Gold	Silver	Bronze
2012 (Sweden) Stockholm	(Poland) Krzysztof Wierzbicki	(Russia) Alexander Karpenko	(Czech Republic) Jiří Horník
2013 (Russia) Suzdal	(Poland) Krzysztof Wierzbicki	(United Kingdom) Stephen Manuel	(Brazil) David Coimbra
2014 (South Africa) Potchefstroom	(Poland) Krzysztof Wierzbicki	(Ukraine) Mykhaylo Bulanyy	(United Kingdom) Stephen Manuel
2015 (Finland) Salo	(Poland) Krzysztof Wierzbicki	(United States) Layne Norton	(United States) LS McClain
2016 (United States) Killeen	(Ukraine) Mykhaylo Bulanyy	(Bulgaria) Borislav Adov	(France) Ali Ben Hadj Ali
2017 (Belarus) Minsk	(United States) LS McClain	(Kazakhstan) Yerlan Smagulov	(Czech Republic) Jakub_Sedláček
2018 (Canada) Calgary	(United States) LS McClain	(Algeria) Amar Kanane	(Brazil) David Coimbra
2019 (Sweden) Helsingborg	(Ukraine) Anatolii Novopismennyi	(Sweden) Gustav Hedlund	(United States) David Woolson
2020 Cancelled			
2021 (Sweden) Halmstad	(United States Virgin Islands) Jonathan Cayco	(Sweden) Gustav Hedlund	(Bulgaria) Emil Krastev
2022 (South Africa) Sun City	(United States) Chance Mitchell	(Bulgaria) Emil Krastev	(United States) Jonathan Cayco
2023 (Malta) Valletta	(United States) Jonathan Cayco	(Sweden) Gustav Hedlund	(Bulgaria) Emil Krastev
2024 (Lithuania) Druskininkai	(Sweden) Gustav Hedlund	(Bulgaria) Emil Krastev	(United States) Brandon Pitre
2025 (Germany) Chemnitz	(Bulgaria) Emil Krastev	(Sweden) Gustav Hedlund	(United States) Jonathan Cayco

=== -105 kg ===
Meet	Gold	Silver	Bronze
2012 (Sweden) Stockholm	(Luxembourg) Anibal Coimbra	(Estonia) Alex-Edward Raus	(Russia) Dmitriy Likhanov
2013 (Russia) Suzdal	(Estonia) Alex-Edward Raus	(Russia) Dmitry Lihanov	(Finland) Tomi Muhonen
2014 (South Africa) Potchefstroom	(Russia) Yury Belkin	(Russia) Dmitry Lihanov	(Estonia) Alex-Edward Raus
2015 (Finland) Salo	(France) Sofiane Belkesir	(United States) Nick Tylutki	(United Kingdom) Stephen Manuel
2016 (United States) Killeen	(United States) Eli Burks	(Canada) Bryce Krawczyk	(Kazakhstan) Zalim Kuvambaev
2017 (Belarus) Minsk	(Poland) Krzysztof Wierzbicki	(United States) Bryce Lewis	(United States) Garrett Blevins
2018 (Canada) Calgary	(United States) Bryce Lewis	(United States) Garrett Blevins	(Poland) Krzysztof Wierzbicki
2019 (Sweden) Helsingborg	(United States) Eli Burks	(Finland) Tuomas Hautala	(Russia) Ernst Gross
2020 Cancelled			
2021 (Sweden) Halmstad	(Ukraine) Anatolii Novopismennyi	(Sweden) Emil Norling	(France) Corentin Clément
2022 (South Africa) Sun City	(Sweden) Emil Norling	(United States) Michael Davis	(United Kingdom) Abdul Majeed Sulayman
2023 (Malta) Valletta	(Ukraine) Anatolii Novopismennyi	(Sweden) Emil Norling	(Libya) Abdulla Mohamed Ahmeed Mohamed
2024 (Lithuania) Druskininkai	(United States) Ashton Rouska	(Ukraine) Anatolii Novopismennyi	(Sweden) Emil Norling
2025 (Germany) Chemnitz	(United States) Anthony MacNaughton	(United States) Keenan Lee	(Sweden) Emil Norling

=== -120 kg ===
Meet	Gold	Silver	Bronze
2012 (Sweden) Stockholm	(Algeria) Mohamed Bouafia	(Russia) Kamo Simonyan	(United States) Michael Tuchscherer
2013 (Russia) Suzdal	(Bulgaria) Ivaylo Hristov	(United States) Michael Tuchscherer	(Russia) Aleksey Kudryavtsev
2014 (South Africa) Potchefstroom	(Algeria) Mohamed Bouafia	(United States) Michael Tuchscherer	(Russia) Aleksey Kudryavtsev
2015 (Finland) Salo	(Algeria) Mohamed Bouafia	(Bulgaria) Ivaylo Hristov	(United Kingdom) Tony Cliffe
2016 (United States) Killeen	(United States) Dennis Cornelius	(Algeria) Mohamed Bouafia	(United Kingdom) Tony Cliffe
2017 (Belarus) Minsk	(United States) Dennis Cornelius	(United Kingdom) Tony Cliffe	(Poland) Piotr Sadowski
2018 (Canada) Calgary	(Canada) Erik Willis	(Poland) Piotr Sadowski	(Lithuania) Amandas Paulauskas
2019 (Sweden) Helsingborg	(United Kingdom) Tony Cliffe	(Canada) Erik Willis	(Poland) Piotr Sadowski
2020 Cancelled			
2021 (Sweden) Halmstad	(Russia) Konstantin Musaev	(United Kingdom) Tony Cliffe	(Turkey) Cenk Koçak
2022 (South Africa) Sun City	(Algeria) Mohamed Sahad	(United States) Enrique Lugo	(Norway) Carl Petter Sommerseth
2023 (Malta) Valletta	(United Kingdom) Tony Cliffe	(Algeria) Mohamed Sahad	(United Kingdom) Inderraj Dhillon
2024 (Lithuania) Druskininkai	(United States) Bobb Matthews	(Lebanon) Etienne El Chaer	(United Kingdom) Tony Cliffe

=== 120+ kg ===
Meet	Gold	Silver	Bronze
2012 (Sweden) Stockholm	(United States) Blaine Sumner	(Sweden) Robin Sjögren	(Australia) Stephen Pritchard
2013 (Russia) Suzdal	(United States) Brad Gillingham	(Latvia) Mārtiņš Krūze	(Nauru) Jezza Uepa
2014 (South Africa) Potchefstroom	(United States) Ray Williams	(Samoa) Oliva Kirisome	(Latvia) Mārtiņš Krūze
2015 (Finland) Salo	(United States) Ray Williams	(United States) Blaine Sumner	(Canada) Kelly Branton
2016 (United States) Killeen	(United States) Ray Williams	(Nauru) Jezza Uepa	(Canada) Kelly Branton
2017 (Belarus) Minsk	(United States) Ray Williams	(Nauru) Jezza Uepa	(Canada) Kelly Branton
2018 (Canada) Calgary	(United States) Ray Williams	(Canada) Kelly Branton	(Estonia) Siim Rast
2019 (Sweden) Helsingborg	(Nauru) Jezza Uepa	(Estonia) Siim Rast	(Algeria) Ilyes Boughalem
2020 Cancelled			
2021 (Sweden) Halmstad	(United States Virgin Islands) Jesus Olivares	(Canada) Erik Willis	(Ukraine) Dmytro Vovk
2022 (South Africa) Sun City	(United States) Jesus Olivares	(Algeria) Ilyes Boughalem	(Turkey) Cenk Koçak
2023 (Malta) Valletta	(United States) Jesus Olivares	(Georgia (country)) Temur Samkharadze	(Turkey) Cenk Koçak
2024 (Lithuania) Druskininkai	(United States) Jesus Olivares	(Georgia (country)) Temur Samkharadze	(France) Stanley Odin

=== Gold Medal Totals ===
Gold Medal Total per Weight Category (kg)
Year	-59 kg	-66 kg	-74 kg	-83 kg	-93 kg	-105 kg	-120 kg	+120 kg
2012	651	640	670	720	765	847.5	915.5	907.5
2013	570	632.5	686	760	810	840	905	920
2014	661	642.5	687.5	770	847.5	867.5	945	972.5
2015	656	650.5	712.5	775	832.5	827.5	927.5	1,000.5
2016	669.5	670	730	813	840	845	978.5	1,043
2017	660	680	757	795	827.5	885	968.5	1,090
2018	664	688	758	830.5	820	875.5	900	1,083.5
2019	635	705.5	790.5	833	852.5	855	920	972.5
2021	640	692.5	727.5	841	873	937.5	927.5	1,045
2022	565	710	790	802.5	878.5	912.5	920	1,022.5
2023	625	705	778	815	888	940	952.5	1,080
2024	637.5	707.5	836	845	895	940.5	970	1,112.5
2025	637.5	742.5	842.5	890	910	975.5	962.5	1,070

== See also ==
- List of IPF world champions in powerlifting (equipped)

The primary difference between IPF Classic (Raw) and IPF Equipped powerlifting is the use of supportive gear. Classic allows only a belt, knee sleeves, and wrist wraps, while Equipped allows specialized, single-ply squat/deadlift suits and bench shirts that provide significant support and increase maximum weight lifted.
