= Athletics at the 2017 Canada Summer Games =

Athletics at the 2017 Canada Summer Games were in Winnipeg, Manitoba at the University Stadium at the University of Manitoba. It was held from the July 31-August 4. There were 54 events of athletics.

== Results ==
=== Male ===
==== 100m ====
Rank	Athlete	Province	Time
1st place, gold medalist(s)	Karson Kowalchuk	Ontario	10.38
2nd place, silver medalist(s)	Jerome Blake	British Columbia	10.38
3rd place, bronze medalist(s)	Samuel Adams	Ontario	10.62
4	Josh Lunda	Nova Scotia	10.70
5	Ryan Botterill	Saskatchewan	10.80
6	Ben Tjernagel	British Columbia	10.81
7	Austin Edwards	Saskatchewan	10.86
8	Temi Olonisakin	Alberta	10.94

==== 100m Special Olympics ====
Rank	Athlete	Province	Time
1st place, gold medalist(s)	Gaerrisen Freeland	Ontario	11.81
2nd place, silver medalist(s)	Malcolm Jovahny Borsoi	British Columbia	11.85
3rd place, bronze medalist(s)	Donald Peters	Nova Scotia	12.17
4	Bradyn Giraudier	Saskatchewan	12.31
5	Caleb Friesen	Manitoba	12.56
6	Brock Terlesky	British Columbia	12.70
7	Guillaume Bénard	Quebec	12.98
8	Matthew Therrien	Manitoba	13.00

==== 200m ====
Rank	Athlete	Province	Time
1st place, gold medalist(s)	Jerome Blake	British Columbia	20.87
2nd place, silver medalist(s)	Karson Kowalchuk	Ontario	20.88
3rd place, bronze medalist(s)	Khamal Stewart-Baynes	Ontario	21.12
4	Austin Edwards	Saskatchewan	21.54
5	Dustie Joseph	Quebec	21.82
6	Josh Lunda	Nova Scotia	21.87
7	Daniel Bubelenyi	Alberta	21.89
8	William Gagnon	Quebec	22.11

==== 200m Special Olympics ====
Rank	Athlete	Province	Time
1st place, gold medalist(s)	Malcolm Jovahny Borsoi	British Columbia	24.23
2nd place, silver medalist(s)	Gaerrisen Freeland	Ontario	24.60
3rd place, bronze medalist(s)	Donald Peters	Nova Scotia	24.96
4	Bradyn Giraudier	Saskatchewan	25.27
5	Caleb Friesen	Manitoba	25.83
6	Stephane Piccinin	Nova Scotia	25.99
7	Brock Terlesky	British Columbia	26.59
8	Matthew Therrien	Manitoba	26.66

==== 400m ====
Rank	Athlete	Province	Time
1st place, gold medalist(s)	Austin Cole	Alberta	47.25
2nd place, silver medalist(s)	Ramzi Abdulahi	Ontario	47.60
3rd place, bronze medalist(s)	Alexander Szuba	Quebec	47.68
4	Graeme Thompson	Ontario	48.59
5	Hunter Bosch	Saskatchewan	49.05
6	Michael Aono	British Columbia	49.09
7	Josh Hamilton	Newfoundland and Labrador	49.21
-	Mike van der Poel	Nova Scotia	DNS

==== 800m ====
Rank	Athlete	Province	Time
1st place, gold medalist(s)	Marco Arop	Alberta	1:49.23
2nd place, silver medalist(s)	Alexander Eiswerth	Saskatchewan	1:49.92
3rd place, bronze medalist(s)	Shane Dillon	Manitoba	1:50.12
4	Rhys Kramer	Alberta	1:51.42
5	Hudson Ross Grimshaw-Surette	Nova Scotia	1:51.76
6	Lukas Jarron	British Columbia	1:51.79
7	Ben Devito	Ontario	1:52.48
8	Ben Richardson	Ontario	1:54.80

==== 1500m ====
Rank	Athlete	Province	Time
1st place, gold medalist(s)	Alexander Eiswerth	Saskatchewan	3:55.03
2nd place, silver medalist(s)	Lukas Jarron	British Columbia	3:55.27
3rd place, bronze medalist(s)	Sergio Ráez Villanueva	Ontario	3:56.35
4	Josh Kellier	Ontario	3:57.38
5	Timothy Longley	Nova Scotia	3:57.60
6	Royden Radowits	Alberta	3:58.56
7	Kevin Robertson	Quebec	3:59.07
8	Michael Colford	New Brunswick	3:59.20
9	Brady Graves	New Brunswick	4:04.11
10	Thomas Fafard	Quebec	4:04.61
11	Alex James	Alberta	4:05.54
12	Will Russell	Nova Scotia	4:07.88

==== 5000m ====
Rank	Athlete	Province/Territory	Time
1st place, gold medalist(s)	Jesse Hooton	British Columbia	14:23.59
2nd place, silver medalist(s)	Russell Pennock	Alberta	14:27.42
3rd place, bronze medalist(s)	Sergio Ráez Villanueva	Ontario	14:30.03
4	Jean-Simon Desgagnés	Quebec	14:31.12
5	Caleb de Jong	Manitoba	14:36.52
6	Brady Graves	New Brunswick	14:52.40
7	Andrew Price Peverill	Nova Scotia	14:56.92
8	Angus Rawling	Alberta	15:09.78
9	Marc Turmel	Saskatchewan	15:10.29
10	Alex Cyr	Prince Edward Island	15:11.42
11	Marcel Scheele	Ontario	15:12.30
12	Daniel Heschuk	Manitoba	15:17.08
13	Thomas Fafard	Quebec	15:23.60
14	Kieran Lumb	British Columbia	15:38.08
15	Josh Shanks	New Brunswick	15:54.35
16	Jack Amos	Yukon	15:56.67
17	Levi Patrick Moulton	Newfoundland and Labrador	16:01.47
18	Graeme Ethan Wach	Nova Scotia	16:05.74
19	Matt Noseworthy	Newfoundland and Labrador	16:10.62
20	Joe Parker	Yukon	17:42.46
-	Ibrahim Mohammed	Saskatchewan	DNF
-	Michael Rogers	Prince Edward Island	DNF

==== 110m hurdles ====
Rank	Athlete	Province	Time
1st place, gold medalist(s)	Jackson Cheung	British Columbia	14.20
2nd place, silver medalist(s)	Ashton Colaire	Ontario	14.73
3rd place, bronze medalist(s)	Payne Wylie	Saskatchewan	14.75
4	Bogdan Pavel	British Columbia	14.79
5	Locky Butcher	Nova Scotia	14.96
6	Kensley Florestal	British Columbia	14.98
7	Alex Gall	Ontario	15.32
-	Matthew Daly	Ontario	DSQ

==== 400m hurdles ====
Rank	Athlete	Province	Time
1st place, gold medalist(s)	Jake Hanna	British Columbia	53.68
2nd place, silver medalist(s)	Nate St. Romain	Ontario	53.69
3rd place, bronze medalist(s)	Payne Wylie	Saskatchewan	53.86
4	Kai Spierenburg	Alberta	53.91
5	Kevin M'Pindou	Alberta	55.34
6	Ashton Colaire	Ontario	55.46
7	Timothy Brennan	New Brunswick	55.96
8	Dustie Joseph	Quebec	56.38

==== 3000m Steeplechase ====
Rank	Athlete	Province / Territory	Time
1st place, gold medalist(s)	Jean-Simon Desgagnés	Quebec	9:00.80
2nd place, silver medalist(s)	Josh Kellier	Ontario	9:03.18
3rd place, bronze medalist(s)	Nickolas Peter Colyn	British Columbia	9:03.73
4	Kevin Robertson	Quebec	9:09.53
5	Caleb de Jong	Manitoba	9:10.64
6	Braeden Charlton	British Columbia	9:20.38
7	Ryan Grieco	Alberta	9:20.76
8	Marcel Scheele	Ontario	9:28.71
9	Kieran Halliday	Yukon	9:41.33
10	Angus MacIntosh	New Brunswick	9:42.09
11	Mathieu Desmarais	Manitoba	9:43.59
12	Matt Johnson	Saskatchewan	9:46.48
13	Graeme Ethan Wach	Nova Scotia	10:03.33
14	Bryan Thomas	New Brunswick	10:39.61
-	Greg Hetterley	Saskatchewan	DNF

==== 200m Wheelchair ====
Rank	Athlete	Province / Territory	Time
1st place, gold medalist(s)	Isaiah Christophe	Ontario	27.58
2nd place, silver medalist(s)	Ben Brown	Nova Scotia	28.91
3rd place, bronze medalist(s)	Lee Leclerc	Quebec	30.32
4	Nilton Dario Heredia Amaya	Quebec	30.42
5	Jacob LeBlanc	New Brunswick	30.69
6	Dylan Ritter	Ontario	31.26
7	Sedrick Leonard Richard Skabar	British Columbia	31.77
8	Dillon Joseph MacMillan	Nova Scotia	33.72

==== 400m Wheelchair ====
Rank	Athlete	Province / Territory	Time
1st place, gold medalist(s)	Isaiah Christophe	Ontario	52.74
2nd place, silver medalist(s)	Ben Brown	Nova Scotia	56.33
3rd place, bronze medalist(s)	Lee Leclerc	Quebec	57.15
4	Jacob LeBlanc	New Brunswick	57.36
5	Nilton Dario Heredia Amaya	Quebec	58.20
6	Sedrick Leonard Richard Skabar	British Columbia	1:00.92
7	Dylan Ritter	Ontario	1:01.94
8	Dillon Joseph MacMillan	Nova Scotia	1:06.61

==== 1500m Wheelchair ====
Rank	Athlete	Province / Territory	Time
1st place, gold medalist(s)	Isaiah Christophe	Ontario	3:40.84
2nd place, silver medalist(s)	Ben Brown	Nova Scotia	3:42.79
3rd place, bronze medalist(s)	Jacob LeBlanc	New Brunswick	3:52.98
4	Lee Leclerc	Quebec	3:55.29
5	Sedrick Leonard Richard Skabar	British Columbia	3:55.72
6	Nilton Dario Heredia Amaya	Quebec	3:56.18
7	Balraj Partridge	British Columbia	4:12.22
8	Dylan Ritter	Ontario	4:32.17
9	Hunter Graves	Alberta	4:55.60

==== 4x100m Relay ====
Rank	Province	Competitors	Time
1st place, gold medalist(s)	Ontario	Samuel Adams, Khamal Stewart-Baynes, Graeme Thompson, Karson Kowalchuk	40:06
2nd place, silver medalist(s)	Quebec	Alexander Szuba, Yassine Aber, Matthew Daly, Dustie Joseph	41.27
3rd place, bronze medalist(s)	Saskatchewan	Austin Edwards, Ryan Botterill, Austin Strauss, Kieran Johnston	41.42
4	Alberta	Daniel Bubelenyi, Temitope Olonisakin, Sheldon Louza, Aaron Hernandez	42.00
5	Manitoba	Bryan Yallits, Marcel Dufault, Stefan Hreno, Luc Deleau	42.09
6	Prince Edward Island	Owen MacFadyen, Daniel Whalen, Zach Wilson, Damon MacDonald	43.45
-	New Brunswick	Brandon Cleghorn, Tyrell Marin, Braden Harrison, Alexander Williston	DNF
-	Newfoundland and Labrador	Harshal Deshpande, Gerard Power, Jeremy Kakoko, Andrew Wood	DSQ
-	British Columbia	Nathan Mah, Benjamin Tjernagel, Michael Aono, Jerome Blake	DSQ

==== 4x400m Relay ====
Rank	Province	Competitors	Time
1st place, gold medalist(s)	British Columbia	Jake Hanna, Jerome Blake, Lukas Jarron, Michael Aono	3:13.18
2nd place, silver medalist(s)	Alberta	Sheldon Louza, Marco Arop, Kai Spierenburg, Austin Cole	3:13.31
3rd place, bronze medalist(s)	Saskatchewan	Hunter Bosch, Jared Welsh, Austin Strauss, Kieran Johnston	3:14.56
4	Manitoba	Luc Deleau, Tristan Allen, Simon Berube, Shane Dillon	3:15.19
5	Quebec	Dustie Joseph, Yassine Aber, Philippe Baril, Alexander Szuba	3:16.45
6	Nova Scotia	Jacob Symonds, Hudson Grimshaw-Surette, Shiloh Johnson, Noah James	3:19.17
7	New Brunswick	Braden Harrison, Jack Berkshire, Kenneth McGovern, Andrew Leblanc	3:19.79
-	Ontario	Khamal Stewart-Baynes, Graeme Thompson, Nathaniel St. Romain, Ramzi Abdulahi	DNF

==== High jump ====
Rank	Athlete	Province	Result
1st place, gold medalist(s)	Emile Ollivier	British Columbia	2.11
2nd place, silver medalist(s)	Nathan Smith	Manitoba	2.08
3rd place, bronze medalist(s)	Philippe St-Hilaire	Quebec	2.08
4	Eric Chatten	British Columbia	2.08
5	Hans Lafleur	Ontario	2.00
5	Noel Vanderzee	Alberta	2.00
7	Colin Unruh	Alberta	2.00
8	Joel Della Siega	British Columbia	2.00
9	Logan Coulet	Nova Scotia	1.95
10	Kaelan Schmidt	Nova Scotia	1.95
11	Tacuma Anderson-Richards	Ontario	1.90
12	Sidiki Sow	Manitoba	1.90

==== Long jump ====
Rank	Athlete	Province	Result
1st place, gold medalist(s)	Stevens Dorcelus	Quebec	7.84
2nd place, silver medalist(s)	Jesse Thibodeau	Quebec	7.23
3rd place, bronze medalist(s)	Austin Ost	Alberta	7.07
4	Tacuma Anderson-Richards	Ontario	7.06
5	Ryan Taylor	Ontario	6.94
6	William Nti	Manitoba	6.80
7	Sody Nkwonta	Alberta	6.65
8	Zack Kuzyk	British Columbia	6.61
9	Brandon Cleghorn	New Brunswick	6.49
10	Josh Hamilton	Newfoundland and Labrador	6.47
11	Ty Pederson	Saskatchewan	6.36
12	Bryce Mackenzie	British Columbia	6.27

==== Triple jump ====
Rank	Athlete	Province	Result
1st place, gold medalist(s)	Patrick Hanna	Quebec	15.63
2nd place, silver medalist(s)	Aaron Hernandez	Alberta	15.25
3rd place, bronze medalist(s)	Tacuma Anderson-Richards	Ontario	15.09
4	Frédéric Hanna	Quebec	14.85
5	Ryan Taylor	Ontario	14.77
6	Denzel Brown	British Columbia	14.60
7	Vlad Moldavanov	British Columbia	14.17
8	Sody Nkwonta	Alberta	13.80
9	Jamie Dumaran	Manitoba	13.77
10	Joshua Magri	Manitoba	13.53
11	Raheem Aljermaine Elliott	Nova Scotia	13.38
12	Allan Boutilier	New Brunswick	12.63
13	Spencer House	Saskatchewan	11.65
-	Julien Léger	New Brunswick	FOUL

==== Pole vault ====
Rank	Athlete	Province	Result
1st place, gold medalist(s)	David Thomas Boyd	British Columbia	4.80
2nd place, silver medalist(s)	Ross Benn	Ontario	4.70
3rd place, bronze medalist(s)	Daniel Gleason	Ontario	4.60
4	Maxime Léveillé	Quebec	4.50
5	Samuel Burton	Quebec	4.50
6	James Kenny	Manitoba	4.25
7	Alain Doucet	New Brunswick	4.10
7	Ethan Foster	British Columbia	4.10
9	Jean-Luc Bastarache	New Brunswick	3.95
10	Jonah Murray	Saskatchewan	3.80
11	Jackson Penner	Manitoba	3.60
12	Brendan Ritchie	Saskatchewan	3.40
13	Collin Hubbard	Alberta	3.40

==== Shot Put ====
Rank	Athlete	Province	Result
1st place, gold medalist(s)	Joseph Maxwell	Ontario	17.32
2nd place, silver medalist(s)	Eli Pawliw	Ontario	17.22
3rd place, bronze medalist(s)	Liam Turgeon	New Brunswick	14.66
4	Clement Sackey	Manitoba	14.09
5	Ben Ingvaldson	Alberta	13.52
6	Benjamin Lafrenaye-Dugas	Quebec	13.09
7	Samir Aber	Quebec	12.84
8	Tyrell Sawatzky	Saskatchewan	12.82
9	Liam Banks	Alberta	12.51
10	Gregory Isaac Millman McCarthy	Nova Scotia	12.29
11	Jarod Manuel	New Brunswick	11.95
12	Jared Allary	Manitoba	11.57
13	Pjeter Evelley	Newfoundland and Labrador	10.72
14	Carter Cheveldayoff	Saskatchewan	10.70
15	Peter Behncke	British Columbia	10.37

==== Discus ====
Rank	Athlete	Province/Territory	Result
1st place, gold medalist(s)	Mackenzie Josie	Ontario	50.38
2nd place, silver medalist(s)	Joseph Maxwell	Ontario	50.18
3rd place, bronze medalist(s)	Samir Aber	Quebec	45.65
4	Liam Banks	Alberta	45.57
5	Andrew Li	British Columbia	42.68
6	Tyrell Sawatzky	Saskatchewan	42.35
7	Alex Rawding	Nova Scotia	41.94
8	Riley Jennings	Nova Scotia	41.10
9	Benjamin Lafrenaye-Dugas	Quebec	40.67
10	Carter Cheveldayoff	Saskatchewan	39.98
11	Max Szczawinski	British Columbia	39.05
12	Andreas Troschke	Alberta	37.89

==== Discus Para ====
Rank	Athlete	Province	Result	Points
1st place, gold medalist(s)	Dakoda Darling	British Columbia	30.81	527
2nd place, silver medalist(s)	Ryan Shay	Nova Scotia	11.55	336
3rd place, bronze medalist(s)	Eddy Abel Thomm Solla	British Columbia	21.49	273
4	Brian Hnatiw	Alberta	15.44	246
5	Daryl Yuen	British Columbia	15.43	119
6	Max Arsenault	New Brunswick	7.98	87
7	Ryan Bennett	Ontario	13.71	46
8	Maxime Landry	Quebec	12.60	26

==== Javelin ====
Rank	Athlete	Province	Result
1st place, gold medalist(s)	Ben Cross	Ontario	66.49
2nd place, silver medalist(s)	Gabriel Bisson-Desrosiers	Quebec	61.74
3rd place, bronze medalist(s)	Joshua Caleb Mather	Ontario	59.96
4	Isaac Sandri	British Columbia	58.22
5	Quinton MacMillan	Alberta	54.91
6	Dillon Mayhew	Alberta	54.33
7	Jake Temple	Nova Scotia	50.59
8	Joshua Bell	Nova Scotia	50.20
9	Raphaël Choquette	New Brunswick	48.16
10	Jacob Didier	Quebec	47.17
11	Malcolm Gilman	Prince Edward Island	44.63
12	Jake Hanna	British Columbia	40.25

==== Hammer ====
Rank	Athlete	Province	Result
1st place, gold medalist(s)	Sam Willett	British Columbia	54.50
2nd place, silver medalist(s)	Peter Behncke	British Columbia	51.14
3rd place, bronze medalist(s)	Andreas Troschke	Alberta	50.69
4	Ben Ingvaldson	Alberta	50.36
5	Cole Fry	Saskatchewan	47.18
6	Tony Elliott	Ontario	46.52
7	Tory Shewfelt	Saskatchewan	46.19
8	Benjamin Lafrenaye-Dugas	Quebec	43.92
9	Josie Mackenzie	Ontario	42.82
10	Gregory Isaac Millman McCarthy	Nova Scotia	42.50
11	Jared Allary	Manitoba	42.11
12	Liam Turgeon	New Brunswick	38.13
13	Samir Aber	Quebec	37.79
14	Brock Segal	Manitoba	34.59
15	Jarod Manuel	New Brunswick	32.65

==== Decathlon ====
Rank	Athlete	Province	100 m	LJ	SP	HJ	400 m	110 m H	DT	PV	JT	1500 m	Overall points
1st place, gold medalist(s)	Jonah Elbaz	Quebec	679	635	628	619	730	828	709	645	544	528	6545
2nd place, silver medalist(s)	Kieran Johnston	Saskatchewan	827	743	557	644	887	887	363	357	426	712	6403
3rd place, bronze medalist(s)	Philippe Baril	Quebec	721	684	582	544	776	718	533	457	613	644	6272
4	Peter Collier	Nova Scotia	801	864	460	670	764	785	341	431	362	638	6116
5	Jean-Luc Bastarache	New Brunswick	578	688	505	644	583	624	507	617	557	636	5939
6	Ryan Evans	New Brunswick	663	533	489	644	686	702	404	406	588	685	5800
7	Ethan Foster	British Columbia	578	661	458	544	676	494	438	617	338	737	5541
8	Locky Butcher	Ontario	695	593	626	749	625	854	346	242	411	282	5423
9	Jackson Penner	Manitoba	614	608	460	644	716	533	458	509	223	614	5379
10	Ross Benn	Ontario	624	615	515	544	461	413	355	760	422	355	5064
11	Joey Pittman	Newfoundland and Labrador	643	571	507	520	619	500	473	357	390	429	5009
12	Jean-Luc Perron	Manitoba	649	600	512	472	632	498	407	0	344	503	4617
13	Brendan Ritchie	Saskatchewan	626	512	514	0	558	646	349	406	401	531	4543
14	Collin Hubbard	Alberta	645	613	453	472	430	241	295	406	260	437	4252

=== Female ===
==== 100m ====
Rank	Athlete	Province	Time
1st place, gold medalist(s)	DeOndra Green	Quebec	11.63
2nd place, silver medalist(s)	Shyvonne Roxborough	Ontario	11.68
3rd place, bronze medalist(s)	Tegan Turner	Manitoba	11.81
4	Nyoka Maxwell	Ontario	11.89
5	Audrey Leduc	Quebec	12.01
6	Shannay Raven Beals	Nova Scotia	12.05
7	Sandy Latrace	Alberta	12.12
8	Valda Kabia	British Columbia	12.13

==== 100m Special Olympics ====
Rank	Athlete	Province	Time
1st place, gold medalist(s)	Kristy Alford	Ontario	13.79
2nd place, silver medalist(s)	Regan Hofley	Manitoba	13.99
3rd place, bronze medalist(s)	Joy MacLachlan	Nova Scotia	14.00
4	Desiree Allen	Ontario	14.22
5	Lisa Provencher	Quebec	14.61
6	April Armstrong	British Columbia	14.91
7	Melissa Semke	British Columbia	15.67
8	Vesta Orchard	Manitoba	15.73

==== 200m ====
Rank	Athlete	Province	Time
1st place, gold medalist(s)	DeOndra Green	Quebec	23.82
2nd place, silver medalist(s)	Jasneet Nijjar	British Columbia	23.83
3rd place, bronze medalist(s)	Audrey Jackson	Quebec	24.09
4	Nyoka Maxwell	Ontario	24.10
5	Lindsay Brandys	Ontario	24.33
6	Tegan Turner	Manitoba	24.36
7	Katherine Emily Lucas	British Columbia	24.60
8	Tayo Babalola	Manitoba	24.64

==== 200m Special Olympics ====
Rank	Athlete	Province	Time
1st place, gold medalist(s)	Kristy Alford	Ontario	28.44
2nd place, silver medalist(s)	Regan Hofley	Manitoba	28.80
3rd place, bronze medalist(s)	Desiree Allen	Ontario	29.28
4	Lisa Provencher	Quebec	30.52
5	April Armstrong	British Columbia	31.65
6	Melissa Semke	British Columbia	32.33
7	Vesta Orchard	Manitoba	33.02
-	Joy MacLachlan	Nova Scotia	DSQ

==== 400m ====
Rank	Athlete	Province	Time
1st place, gold medalist(s)	Victoria Tachinski	Manitoba	54.04
2nd place, silver medalist(s)	Audrey Jackson	Quebec	54.29
3rd place, bronze medalist(s)	Katrina Innanen	Ontario	55.44
4	Catherine Léger	Quebec	55.47
5	Kristen Metcalfe	Ontario	55.88
6	Lauren D'Agnolo	British Columbia	56.04
7	Heather Theresa Beaton	Nova Scotia	56.39
8	Natalie McDougall	Alberta	56.65

==== 800m ====
Rank	Athlete	Province	Time
1st place, gold medalist(s)	Julie Labach	Saskatchewan	2:06.62
2nd place, silver medalist(s)	Victoria Tachinski	Manitoba	2:06.81
3rd place, bronze medalist(s)	Kate Ayers	Ontario	2:08.17
4	Aurélie Dubé-Lavoie	Quebec	2:08.17
5	Kate Current	Ontario	2:08.48
6	Addy Elizabeth Townsend	British Columbia	2:11.28
7	Alana Dawn Mussatto	British Columbia	2:11.30
8	Janae Watts	Alberta	2:12.42

==== 1500m ====
Rank	Athlete	Province	Time
1st place, gold medalist(s)	Aurélie Dubé-Lavoie	Quebec	4:19.24
2nd place, silver medalist(s)	Julie Labach	Saskatchewan	4:21.25
3rd place, bronze medalist(s)	Courtney Hufsmith	Saskatchewan	4:21.32
4	Natalia Hawthorn	Ontario	4:22.27
5	Kate Ayers	Ontario	4:23.60
6	Taryn Montgomery O'Neill	British Columbia	4:26.03
7	Savanna Jordan	Alberta	4:26.91
8	Catherine Beauchemin	Quebec	4:35.10
9	Julia Howley	Newfoundland and Labrador	4:36.62
10	Miryam Michaela Vinka Bassett	British Columbia	4:37.71
11	Erin Valgardson	Manitoba	4:37.97
12	Erin Tramley	Manitoba	4:41.54
13	Michaela Walker	Prince Edward Island	4:42.31
14	Shaylynn Tell	Nova Scotia	4:44.40
15	Emma Hubbard	Alberta	4:57.19
16	Hannah Cormier	New Brunswick	4:59.57
17	Jenny Brace	Newfoundland and Labrador	5:15.56

==== 5000m ====
Rank	Athlete	Province/Territory	Time
1st place, gold medalist(s)	Natalia Hawthorn	Ontario	16:44.76
2nd place, silver medalist(s)	Laura Dickinson	New Brunswick	16:56.23
3rd place, bronze medalist(s)	Meggie Dargis	Quebec	17:05.02
4	Savanna Jordan	Alberta	17:09.86
5	Courtney Hufsmith	Saskatchewan	17:16.00
6	Aurilla Wilson	Saskatchewan	17:17.61
7	Sylvia Russell	Ontario	17:42.56
8	Rebecca Bassett	British Columbia	17:42.71
9	Emma Kusch Dahle	Manitoba	18:04.92
10	Enid Man Yee Au	British Columbia	18:08.58
11	Danae Keddie	Alberta	18:18.28
12	Shaylynn Tell	Nova Scotia	18:30.01
13	Carol-Ann MacDonald	New Brunswick	18:30.42
14	Jenna MacDonald	Nova Scotia	18:42.27
15	Janine Zajac	Manitoba	19:20.95
16	Camille Galloway	Yukon	19:49.55
17	Megan Ryan	Newfoundland and Labrador	20:43.98
18	Tori Fitzpatrick	Prince Edward Island	21:36.44
-	Aurélie Dubé-Lavoie	Quebec	DNF

==== 100m Hurdles ====
Rank	Athlete	Province	Time
1st place, gold medalist(s)	Brittany Stenekes	Ontario	13.57
2nd place, silver medalist(s)	Katelyn Lehner	Saskatchewan	13.60
3rd place, bronze medalist(s)	Hailey Hitchings	Alberta	13.77
4	Emma Nero	Ontario	14.03
5	Diana Voloshin	British Columbia	14.06
6	Chloé Royce	Quebec	14.30
7	Rebecca Barkway	Saskatchewan	14.59
-	Jaymie O'Connor	Quebec	DNF

==== 400m Hurdles ====
Rank	Athlete	Province	Time
1st place, gold medalist(s)	Megan Champoux	British Columbia	59.46
2nd place, silver medalist(s)	Charlotte Terek	Alberta	1:00.47
3rd place, bronze medalist(s)	Dallyssa Huggins	Ontario	1:00.69
4	Sophia Mbabaali	Manitoba	1:00.92
5	Ally Oulds	Ontario	1:02.01
6	Sophie Dodd	British Columbia	1:02.30
7	Marie-Frédérique Poulin	Quebec	1:03.74
8	Elizabeth Comeau	Nova Scotia	1:04.15

==== 3000m Steeplechase ====
Rank	Athlete	Province	Time
1st place, gold medalist(s)	Grace Fetherstonhaugh	British Columbia	10:15.32
2nd place, silver medalist(s)	Laura Dickinson	New Brunswick	10:27.99
3rd place, bronze medalist(s)	Courtney Hufsmith	Saskatchewan	10:38.98
4	Sylvia Russell	Ontario	10:53.63
5	Andie Wood	Manitoba	10:54.43
6	Kate Anderson	Alberta	11:03.19
7	Anne-Frédérik Drolet	Quebec	11:16.75
8	Kaila Neigum	Saskatchewan	11:17.74
9	Nicole Kitt	Alberta	11:24.39
10	Chelsea Ribeiro	British Columbia	11:32.91
11	Carol-Ann MacDonald	New Brunswick	11:36.67
12	Tanna Burke	Nova Scotia	11:42.68
13	Dallyssa Huggins	Ontario	11:53.65
14	Belinda Guerra	Manitoba	11:54.13
15	Breanna Sandluck	Nova Scotia	12:10.25
-	Catherine Beauchemin	Quebec	DNF

==== 200m Wheelchair ====
Rank	Athlete	Province	Time
1st place, gold medalist(s)	Veronica Coombes	New Brunswick	38.49
2nd place, silver medalist(s)	Yeshi Renaerts	British Columbia	47.06
3rd place, bronze medalist(s)	Jessica Tinney	Ontario	47.29
4	Cori Hicks	Newfoundland and Labrador	57.92
-	Navarra Li Houldin	Alberta	DSQ

==== 400m Wheelchair ====
Rank	Athlete	Province	Time
1st place, gold medalist(s)	Veronica Coombes	New Brunswick	1:16.73
2nd place, silver medalist(s)	Yeshi Renaerts	British Columbia	1:29.72
3rd place, bronze medalist(s)	Jessica Tinney	Ontario	1:37.12
4	Navarra Li Houldin	Alberta	1:37.53
5	Cori Hicks	Newfoundland and Labrador	2:05.11

==== 1500m Wheelchair ====
Rank	Athlete	Province	Time
1st place, gold medalist(s)	Veronica Coombes	New Brunswick	5:39.35
2nd place, silver medalist(s)	Yeshi Renaerts	British Columbia	5:50.38
3rd place, bronze medalist(s)	Jessica Tinney	Ontario	6:24.07
4	Navarra Li Houldin	Alberta	6:34.63
5	Cori Hicks	Newfoundland and Labrador	6:37.87

==== 4x100m Relay ====
Rank	Province	Competitors	Time
1st place, gold medalist(s)	British Columbia	Diana Voloshin, Valda Kaydee Kabia, Jasneet Nijjar, Katherine Lucas	45.73
2nd place, silver medalist(s)	Alberta	Hailey Hitchings, Grace Werner, Cassandra Grenkey, Sandy Latrace	46.13
3rd place, bronze medalist(s)	Manitoba	Rachael McLeod, Tayo Babalola, Tegan Turner, Brianna Tynes	46.18
4	Saskatchewan	Mackenzi Kleiter, Rachel Rosin, Taylor Strauss, Katelyn Lehner	47.61
5	Nova Scotia	Hayley Wilson, Olivia Moller, Taylor Mattinson, Shannay Beals	47.80
6	Newfoundland and Labrador	Nicole Chan, Jennifer Boland, Erica Hayward, Mykenzi Harding	49.73
7	New Brunswick	Caroline Gagnon, Véronique Omalosanga, Joelle Leger, Samantha Taylor	1:01.58

==== 4x400m Relay ====
Rank	Province	Competitors	Time
1st place, gold medalist(s)	British Columbia	Megan Champoux, Addy Townsend, Sophie Dodd, Lauren D'Agnolo	3:43.35
2nd place, silver medalist(s)	Manitoba	Tayo Babalola, Erin White, Sophia Mbabaali, Victoria Tachinski	3:43.65
3rd place, bronze medalist(s)	Ontario	Kristen Metcalfe, Ally Oulds, Kate Current, Katrina Innanen	3:43.84
4	Quebec	Catherine Léger, Marie-Frédérique Poulin, Marie Hudson Innocent, Audrey Jackson	3:45.49
5	Alberta	Natalie McDougall, Calla Isaac, Charlotte Terek, Ashley Whiteman	3:45.69
6	Nova Scotia	Edie Wilson, Allie Flower, Anna McCrea, Heather Beaton	3:46.84
7	Saskatchewan	Angela Moser, Courtney Dembrowski, Jasimine Fehr, Julie Labach	3:57.34
8	New Brunswick	Victoria Leblanc, Monika Leblanc, Magkda Mekonnen, Robyn Davis	4:00.96

==== High Jump ====
Rank	Athlete	Province	Result
1st place, gold medalist(s)	Mikella Lefebvre-Oatis	Quebec	1.86
2nd place, silver medalist(s)	Autumn Bigger	Ontario	1.74
3rd place, bronze medalist(s)	Emily Branderhorst	Ontario	1.71
4	Trinity Hansma	British Columbia	1.71
5	Maude Croteau-Vaillancourt	Quebec	1.68
6	Joely Welburn	Saskatchewan	1.65
7	Zoe Elizabeth Carvery	Nova Scotia	1.60
8	Sophie Elizabeth Black	New Brunswick	1.60
9	Bella Willett	Nova Scotia	1.60
10	Jamie Kolodinsky	Alberta	1.60
11	Madelyn Curle	Alberta	1.60
12	Dee Cameron	Manitoba	1.60
13	Alyson Edwards	Saskatchewan	1.55
14	Holly Brochu	Newfoundland and Labrador	1.50
15	Madi Lawrence	Manitoba	1.45

==== Long Jump ====
Rank	Athlete	Province/Territory	Result
1st place, gold medalist(s)	Sandy Latrace	Alberta	6.19
2nd place, silver medalist(s)	Tatiana Aholou	Quebec	6.10
3rd place, bronze medalist(s)	Jamilah James	Ontario	5.73
4	Audrey Leduc	Quebec	5.71
5	Katelyn Lehner	Saskatchewan	5.62
6	Sasanie Wanigasekara	Manitoba	5.59
7	Tyra Duma	Manitoba	5.46
8	Diana Voloshin	British Columbia	5.39
9	Jamie Kolodinsky	Alberta	5.26
10	Erica Hayward	Newfoundland and Labrador	5.20
11	Skylar Horton	Northwest Territories	5.01
-	Kristen Erika Schulz	British Columbia	NP

==== Triple Jump ====
Rank	Athlete	Province	Result
1st place, gold medalist(s)	Jamilah James	Ontario	12.40
2nd place, silver medalist(s)	Rebekah Eckert	Manitoba	12.33
3rd place, bronze medalist(s)	Laura Amoi	Ontario	12.29
4	Kristen Erika Schulz	British Columbia	12.25
5	Sasanie Wanigasekara	Manitoba	11.96
6	Tess McDonald	New Brunswick	11.82
7	Ivana Bosung Nyemeck	Quebec	11.62
8	Gabrielle Fraser	Quebec	11.52
9	Lexie Shannon	New Brunswick	11.47
10	Natalie Thompson	Alberta	11.39
11	Tiana Pisoni	Alberta	11.21
12	Mélodie Nelson	Quebec	11.18

==== Pole vault ====
Rank	Athlete	Province	Result
1st place, gold medalist(s)	Makiah Hunt	Ontario	4.02
2nd place, silver medalist(s)	Rachael Wolfs	Ontario	3.85
3rd place, bronze medalist(s)	Meghan Lim	Alberta	3.70
4	Rachel Hyink	Alberta	3.70
5	Leadon Chartier	Saskatchewan	3.55
6	Brittany Salmon	Quebec	3.55
7	Kylie Buchan	Saskatchewan	3.20

==== Shot Put ====
Rank	Athlete	Province	Result
1st place, gold medalist(s)	Sarah Mitton	Nova Scotia	15.61
2nd place, silver medalist(s)	Olivia Moriconi	British Columbia	15.07
3rd place, bronze medalist(s)	Trinity Tutti	Ontario	14.25
4	Jennifer Leanne Bell	New Brunswick	13.89
5	Brooke-Lynn Boyd	Manitoba	12.89
6	Jen Weber	Alberta	12.87
7	Jessica Buettner	Saskatchewan	12.50
8	Haylea Salamon	Saskatchewan	12.20
9	Taylor Heald	Manitoba	12.16
10	Taylor Elaine Stutely	Nova Scotia	11.98
11	Kyla Valerie Hughes	New Brunswick	11.66
12	Gabrielle Rains	Alberta	11.26

==== Shot Put Para ====
Rank	Athlete	Province	Result	Points
1st place, gold medalist(s)	Julia Hanes	Ontario	7.00	1070
2nd place, silver medalist(s)	Sarah Mickey	Alberta	6.62	662
3rd place, bronze medalist(s)	Casey Perrin	Nova Scotia	3.58	603
4	Christel Robichaud	New Brunswick	5.88	484
5	Jessye Marika Brockway	British Columbia	6.62	380
6	Jade Laplante	Quebec	6.39	169

==== Discus ====
Rank	Athlete	Province	Result
1st place, gold medalist(s)	Trinity Tutti	Ontario	51.28
2nd place, silver medalist(s)	Gabrielle Rains	Alberta	49.27
3rd place, bronze medalist(s)	Grace Tennant	Ontario	47.30
4	Taylor Heald	Manitoba	45.72
5	Ariane Dubois	Quebec	44.91
6	Dolly Gabri	British Columbia	44.00
7	Haylea Salamon	Saskatchewan	43.00
8	Olivia Moriconi	British Columbia	42.36
9	Parfaite Ségolène Moussouanga	Quebec	41.76
10	Ainslie Timmons	Nova Scotia	40.10
11	Madelaine Yee	Alberta	39.28
12	Taylor Elaine Stutely	Nova Scotia	38.30

==== Discus Para ====
Rank	Athlete	Province	Result	Points
1st place, gold medalist(s)	Julia Hanes	Ontario	20.62	1165
2nd place, silver medalist(s)	Sarah Mickey	Alberta	16.40	573
3rd place, bronze medalist(s)	Christel Robichaud	New Brunswick	14.55	475
4	Jessye Marika Brockway	British Columbia	19.76	466
5	Casey Perrin	Nova Scotia	6.12	181
6	Jade Laplante	Quebec	14.93	97

==== Javelin ====
Rank	Athlete	Province	Result
1st place, gold medalist(s)	Ashley Pryke	Ontario	50.68
2nd place, silver medalist(s)	Bailey Dell	Ontario	46.42
3rd place, bronze medalist(s)	Brooke-Lynn Boyd	Manitoba	43.32
4	Rori Kamryn Denness-Lamont	British Columbia	40.78
5	Madelyn Quinn	Nova Scotia	40.70
6	Leslie Thomas	Saskatchewan	40.28
7	Melissa Pellerin	New Brunswick	39.87
8	Maude Croteau-Vaillancourt	Quebec	37.76
9	Bridget Deveau	Nova Scotia	36.82
10	Kyla Valerie Hughes	New Brunswick	34.25
11	Jenna Smith	Saskatchewan	34.06
12	Kira Kopec	Alberta	32.04
13	Madeline Szabo	Alberta	30.48
14	Maude Léveillé	Quebec	28.17
15	Charlotte Elliott	Newfoundland and Labrador	26.52
-	Katara White	Newfoundland and Labrador	NP

==== Hammer ====
Rank	Athlete	Province	Result
1st place, gold medalist(s)	Kaila Butler	British Columbia	56.38
2nd place, silver medalist(s)	Chanell Alexa Botsis	British Columbia	56.21
3rd place, bronze medalist(s)	Lauren Bohn	Ontario	54.34
4	Ariane Dubois	Quebec	51.64
5	Noémie Jeffrey	Quebec	50.68
6	Rebecca Chouinard	Ontario	50.23
7	Madelaine Yee	Alberta	47.64
8	Madeline Szabo	Alberta	47.51
9	Tatum McLean	Nova Scotia	45.90
10	Jessica Buettner	Saskatchewan	43.72
11	Emmarae Dale	Saskatchewan	42.60
-	Sara-Eve Noel	New Brunswick	NP

==== Heptathlon ====
Rank	Athlete	Province/Territory	100 h	HJ	SP	200 m	LJ	JT	800 m	Overall points
1st place, gold medalist(s)	Dallyssa Huggins	Ontario	783	1003	654	798	559	513	944	5254
2nd place, silver medalist(s)	Maude Léveillé	Quebec	943	712	514	868	648	553	856	5094
3rd place, bronze medalist(s)	Kira Kopec	Alberta	864	712	645	799	637	561	732	4950
4	Jansen Ziola	Saskatchewan	949	783	403	874	668	322	765	4764
5	Bridget Deveau	Nova Scotia	814	678	595	735	578	460	881	4741
6	Ashley Tatiana Angela Germain	Quebec	781	678	548	833	640	361	699	4540
7	Sydney Taylor MacDonald	New Brunswick	827	644	482	788	628	572	548	4489
8	Megan Dunn	Ontario	741	544	461	809	581	550	708	4394
9	Lauren Ann Quann	Nova Scotia	786	712	329	711	506	675	625	4344
10	Muriel Stroda	British Columbia	825	610	488	708	490	495	459	4075
11	Isabelle Morris	New Brunswick	527	644	579	565	393	714	499	3921
12	Molly Yungmann	Saskatchewan	781	544	465	754	464	320	548	3876
13	Shae LeDevehat	Newfoundland and Labrador	486	577	469	646	362	538	658	3736
14	Emily Jean Foley	Newfoundland and Labrador	458	610	417	576	317	470	638	3486
15	Kate Londero	Yukon	397	275	436	511	180	363	502	2664
