= Brett Gibbs =

New Zealand powerlifter (born 1991)

Personal information
- Born: 29 January 1991 (age 35)
- Weight: 82.45 kg (181.8 lb)

Sport
- Sport: Powerlifting
Medal record
Men's powerlifting
Representing New Zealand
IPF World Classic Powerlifting Championships
Gold medal – first place	2015 Salo	– 83 kg
Silver medal – second place	2016 Killeen	– 83 kg
Silver medal – second place	2017 Minsk	– 83 kg
Gold medal – first place	2018 Calgary	– 83 kg
Silver medal – second place	2019 Helsingborg	– 83 kg
IPF World Junior Classic Powerlifting Championships
Gold medal – first place	2014 Johannesburg	– 83 kg
IPF World Junior Equipped Powerlifting Championships
11th	2011 Sheffield	– 74 kg
Silver medal – second place	2013 Killeen	– 83 kg
Silver medal – second place	2014 Oroshaza	– 83 kg

Brett Gibbs (born 29 January 1991) is a New Zealand powerlifter, competing in the 83 kilogram weight class. He is a 3-time open world champion and 1-time junior world champion in classic powerlifting.

== Powerlifting career ==
Gibbs was previously the International Powerlifting Federation world record holder in the classic 83 kg weight class. He became the IPF junior classic world champion in 2014 and the open classic world champion in 2015. In 2016, he finished second at the IPF world classic championships behind John Haack.

In 2017, Gibbs finished second behind Ulan Anuar of Kazakhstan. In 2018, Gibbs reclaimed the IPF classic world title with a world record 830.5 kg total (299 kg squat, 214 kg bench, 317.5 kg deadlift). The 299 kg squat and 214 kg bench were also world records.

In 2019, Gibbs would place second, losing to Russel Orhii.
