= Progression of the squat world record =

Listed below is the progression of the squat world record since its introduction as the 'knee bent' and through the emergence of powerlifting and segregation into sleeves and wraps.

Key
Measured weight

== Historical ==
Weight	Holder	Date	Event	Location	Equipment	Ref.
240 kg (529.1 lb)	(Austria) Karl Moerke	1919	Moerke vs. Goerner Duel	Cologne, Germany	Unassisted	
251 kg (553.4 lb)	(Germany) Henry 'Milo' Steinborn	1920	Knee-bent Exhibition	Düsseldorf, Germany	Unassisted	
272.2 kg (600 lb)	(Canada) Doug Hepburn	Dec 1951	Manhattan's Greatest Physical Fitness Show of the Year	New York City, USA	Unassisted	
299.6 kg (660.5 lb)	(United States) Paul Anderson	Dec 1952	Chattanooga & Tennessee Weightlifting Championships	Chattanooga, Tennessee, USA	Unassisted	
324.2 kg (714.8 lb)	(United States) Paul Anderson	May 1953	Boys' Club Exhibition	Georgia, USA	Unassisted	
345.8 kg (762.3 lb)	(United States) Paul Anderson	Jul 1953	Bill Colonna's Strength-Fest Picnic	Norfolk, Virginia, USA	Unassisted	
408.2 kg (900 lb)	(United States) Paul Anderson	1965	Exhibition at powerlifting contest	Silver Spring, Maryland, USA	Unassisted	
421.4 kg (929 lb)	(United States) Paul Anderson	Jul 1965	Region 3 Power Lift Championships	Dallas, Texas, USA	Unassisted	

From this point onwards, powerlifting became mainstream and knee wraps and knee sleeves were introduced.

=== With wraps ===
Weight	Holder	Date	Event	Location	Equipment	Ref.
423.9 kg (934.5 lb)	(United States) Don Reinhoudt	Apr 1976	AAU/IPF Senior Nationals	Ohio, USA	Belt & Wraps	
430 kg (948.0 lb)	(United States) Mark Henry	Jul 1995	ADFPA Men's Nationals	Pennsylvania, USA	Belt & Wraps	
432.5 kg (953.5 lb)	(United States) Mark Henry	Oct 1995	WDFPF World Championships	Sussex, England	Belt & Wraps	
442.5 kg (975.5 lb)	(United States) Robert Wilkerson	Jun 2010	SPF National Powerlifting and Bench Press Championship	Texas, USA	Belt & Wraps	
450 kg (992.1 lb)	(Russia) Andrey Malanichev	Dec 2010	BB Worldlifting	Moscow, Russia	Belt & Wraps	
453.6 kg (1000 lb)	(United States) Robert Wilkerson	Mar 2011	SPF Ironman Classic	Texas, USA	Belt & Wraps	
460 kg (1014.1 lb)	(Russia) Andrey Malanichev	Feb 2014	RUPC Raw Unity VII	Port St. Lucie, Florida, USA	Belt & Wraps	
475 kg (1047.2 lb)	(Russia) Andrey Malanichev	Dec 2015	WRPF World Championships	Moscow, Russia	Belt & Wraps	
485 kg (1069.2 lb)	(Russia) Andrey Malanichev	Oct 2016	ProRaw Big Dogs	Frankston, Victoria, Australia	Belt & Wraps	
500 kg (1102.3 lb)	(Israel) Vlad Alhazov	Jul 2017	NPA Open Israel Championship	Rishon LeZion, Israel	Belt & Wraps	
505 kg (1113.3 lb)	(Israel) Vlad Alhazov	Mar 2018	ProRaw X	Melbourne, Australia	Belt & Wraps	
510 kg (1124.4 lb)	(Israel) Vlad Alhazov	Dec 2018	WRPF Adrenaline Grand Prix	Minsk, Belarus	Belt & Wraps	
525 kg (1157.4 lb)	(Israel) Vlad Alhazov	Dec 2018	WRPF Adrenaline Grand Prix	Minsk, Belarus	Belt & Wraps	

=== With sleeves ===
Weight	Holder	Date	Event	Location	Equipment	Ref.
438 kg (965.6 lb)	(United States) Ray Williams	Jun 2016	IPF World Classic Powerlifting Championships	Killeen, Texas, USA	Belt & Sleeves	
456 kg (1005.3 lb)	(United States) Ray Williams	Oct 2016	USAPL Raw Nationals	Atlanta, Georgia, USA	Belt & Sleeves	
477.5 kg (1052.7 lb)	(United States) Ray Williams	Mar 2017	NAPF Arnold Slingshot Pro American	Columbus, Ohio, USA	Belt & Sleeves	
485 kg (1069.2 lb)	(United States) Ray Williams	Mar 2018	USAPL Arnold SBD Pro American	Columbus, Ohio, USA	Belt & Sleeves	
490 kg (1080.3 lb)	(United States) Ray Williams	Mar 2019	USAPL Arnold SBD Pro American	Columbus, Ohio, USA	Belt & Sleeves	
490.5 kg (1081.4 lb)	(United States) Devonte Lewis	Jun 2026	USAPL Raw Nationals	Lombard, Illinois, USA	Belt & Sleeves	

=== Equipped ===
Weight	Holder	Date	Event	Location	Equipment	Ref.
455 kg (1003 lb)	(United States) Lee Moran	Jul 1984	USPF Senior National Powerlifting Championships	Dayton, Ohio, USA	Single-Ply	
457.5 kg (1008 lb)	(United States) Fred Hatfield	Apr 1986	USPF Budweiser World Record Breakers	Honolulu, Hawaii, USA	Single-Ply	
458.1 kg (1010 lb)	(United States) Matt Dimel	May 1986	USPF Lake Erie Open Powerlifting	Sandusky, Ohio, USA	Single-Ply	
460 kg (1014.1 lb)	(United States) Fred Hatfield	Mar 1987	USPF Budweiser World Record Breakers	Honolulu, Hawaii, USA	Single-Ply	
462.5 kg (1019.6 lb)	(United States) Dave Pansanella	Apr 1988	USPF Budweiser World Record Breakers	Honolulu, Hawaii, USA	Single-Ply	
467.5 kg (1030.7 lb)	(United States) Dave Pansanella	May 1989	APF Junior Nationals	Rosement, Illinois, USA	Single-Ply	
471 kg (1039 lb)	(United States) Ed Coan	Aug 2001	WPO Semi Finals	Orlando, Florida, USA	Single-Ply	
487.5 kg (1075 lb)	(United States) Brent Mikesell	Mar 2002	CPC Canadian Nationalists	Red Deer, Alberta, Canada	Multi-Ply	
500 kg (1102.3 lb)	(United States) Steve Goggins	Feb 2003	WPO Finals	Columbus, Ohio, USA	Multi-Ply	
517.5 kg (1141 lb)	(United States) Brent Mikesell	Nov 2003	WPC World Championships	Calgary, Alberta, Canada	Multi-Ply	
545 kg (1201 lb)	(United States) Jeff Lewis	Oct 2005	WPO Semifinals	Chicago, Illinois, USA	Multi-Ply	
550 kg (1212.5 lb)	(United States) Jeff Lewis	Mar 2006	WPO Finalds	Columbus, Ohio, USA	Multi-Ply	
567 kg (1250 lb)	(Israel) Vladislav Alhazov	Jan 2008	IPA Columbus Pro-Arm	Columbus, Ohio, USA	Multi-Ply	
571.5 kg (1260 lb)	(United States) Donnie Thompson	Apr 2011	SPF North Myrtle Beach Classic	North Myrtle Beach, South Carolina, USA	Multi-Ply	
573.8 kg (1265 lb)	(United States) Donnie Thompson	Aug 2011	SPF PowerStation Pro/Am	North Myrtle Beach, South Carolina, USA	Multi-Ply	
575 kg (1267.7 lb)	Jonas Rantanen	Mar 2015	FPO Western Canadian Championchips	Lahti, Finland	Multi-Ply	
577.5 kg (1273 lb)	(United States) Dave Hoff	Oct 2019	WPC / WPO Super Finals	St. Charles, Illinois, USA	Multi-Ply	
580 kg (1287 lb)	(South Africa) Nathan Baptist	Jul 2020	UPA Utah Kick-Off	Clearfield, Utah, USA	Multi-Ply	
592.5 kg (1306 lb)	(United States) Brian Caroll	Oct 2020	RPS Gene Rychlak Jr. Pro Invational	Rogersville, Tennessee, USA	Multi-Ply	
594.7 kg (1311 lb)	(South Africa) Nathan Baptist	Feb 2021	PSM Barbell	Clearfield, Utah, USA	Multi-Ply	

== See also ==
- Progression of the deadlift world record
- Progression of the bench press world record
