= Heather Connor =

American powerlifter

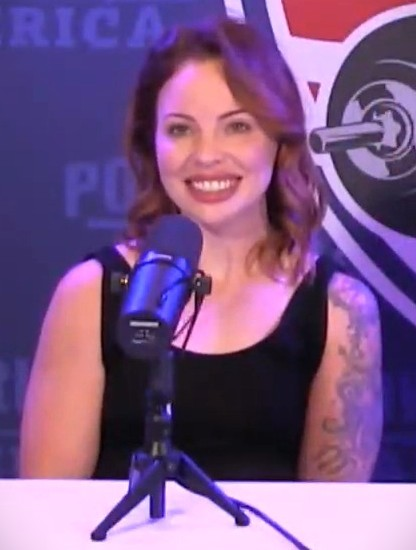
- Connor in 2023

Personal information
- Born: April 18, 1991 (age 35)
- Height: 147 cm (4 ft 10 in)
- Weight: 46.7 kg (103 lb)

Sport
- Sport: Powerlifting
Medal record
Women's powerlifting
Representing United States
IPF World Classic Powerlifting Championships
Silver medal – second place	2016 Killeen	– 47 kg
Gold medal – first place	2017 Minsk	– 47 kg
Gold medal – first place	2019 Helsingborg	– 47 kg
Silver medal – second place	2022 Sun City	– 47 kg
Bronze medal – third place	2023 St. Julian's	– 47 kg
Gold medal – first place	2025 Chemnitz	– 47 kg
Powerlifting America Raw Nationals
Gold medal – first place	2022 Austin	– 47 kg
Gold medal – first place	2023 Austin	– 47 kg
Gold medal – first place	2025 College Park	– 47 kg
USA Powerlifting Raw Nationals
Silver medal – second place	2015 Scranton	– 47 kg
Gold medal – first place	2016 Atlanta	– 47 kg
Gold medal – first place	2018 Spokane	– 47 kg
Gold medal – first place	2019 Lombard	– 47 kg
Gold medal – first place	2021 Daytona Beach	– 47 kg
NAPF World Classic Powerlifting Championships
Gold medal – first place	2024 Scottsdale	– 47 kg
FFForce Girl Power
Gold medal – first place	2022 Cenon	Absolute
Bronze medal – third place	2023 Cenon	Absolute

Heather Connor (born April 18, 1991) is an American powerlifter, competing in the 47 kilogram weight class. She is a 3-time IPF world champion and a 7-time national champion.

== Powerlifting career ==
Connor began powerlifting in 2014, originally competing in the 52 kilogram weight class. In 2017, she secured first place at the IPF World Classic Powerlifting Championships.

In 2018, Connor deadlifted 182.5 kg at USA Powerlifting Raw Nationals, becoming the first female to deadlift 4-times their own bodyweight in an IPF-sanctioned competition, and claiming the highest wilks score by a drug-tested female with a score of 558. She would win the IPF World Championships the following year.

At the 2021 USA Powerlifting Raw Nationals, Connor broke three American Records, squatting 143 kg, deadlifting 192.5 kg and totaling 408 kg.

In 2023, Connor deadlifted 200 kilograms at the 2023 IPF Classic Powerlifting Championships, extending her record by 15 kilograms to claim third place at the competition.

In 2025, Connor secured first place for the first time since 2019, defeating Tiffany Chapon who previous won for four consecutive years. Along the way, she deadlifted 212.5 kilograms for the win, and totaled 535 kilograms, both becoming an IPF open world record.

== Personal life ==
Connor is from North Carolina and is an elementary school teacher. She is a 2009 graduate of Southern Lee High School in Sanford, North Carolina. Connor was diagnosed with scoliosis and had suffered from anxiety prior to powerlifting. Her inspiration to begin powerlifting was from Taiwanese weightlifter and powerlifter Chen Wei-Ling.

== Personal records ==
=== Competition Bests ===
- Squat - 143 kg (315.3 lbs)
- Bench Press - 75 kg (165.3 lbs)
- Deadlift - 200 kg (440.9 lbs)
- Total - 410 kg (903.8 lbs)

=== Record lifts in competition ===
- Deadlift - 152.5 kg (336.2 lbs) - USA Powerlifting Junior Classic American Record - 3/21/2015
- Total - 332.5 kg (733 lbs) - USA Powerlifting Junior Classic American Record - 3/21/2015
- Squat - 143 kg (315.2 lbs) - USA Powerlifting Open Classic American Record - 6/17/2021
- Deadlift - 192.5 kg (424.4 lbs) - USA Powerlifting Open Classic American Record - 6/17/2021
- Total - 408 kg (899.5 lbs) - USA Powerlifting Open Classic American Record - 6/17/2021
- Deadlift - 212.5 kg (468.5 lbs) - IPF Open Classic World Record - 6/8/2025
- Total - 435 kg (959 lbs) - IPF Open Classic World Record - 6/8/2025

=== Records in training ===
- Squat - 152.5 kg (336.2 lbs) - 8/29/2022
- Bench Press - 82.5 kg (181.8 lbs) × 2 - 5/11/2023
- Deadlift - 207.5 kg (457.5 lbs) - 10/11/2023

== External use ==
- Heather Connor on Instagram.
