= Ielja Strik =

Bodybuilder and powerlifter

Medal record

Women's powerlifting

Representing Netherlands

World Games
Silver medal – second place	2013 Cali	Super heavyweight

IPF Women's World Championships
Gold medal – first place	2013 Stavanger	84 kg
Silver medal – second place	2012 Aguadilla	84 kg
Silver medal – second place	2011 Plzeň	84 kg
Bronze medal – third place	2014 Aurora	84 kg

Ielja Strik (born 25 March 1973) is a Dutch powerlifter and a former gymnast and bodybuilder.

== Biography ==
Strik was born on 25 March 1973 in Cuijk. She started gymnastics when she was five years old and practiced this for around 15 years, attaining a reasonably high domestic level. After her build changed she decided that perhaps fitness suited her better as a sport, quickly changing to bodybuilding. After a number of successes Strik started powerlifting in 2001. Quickly it turned out she possessed quite some strength and after a month of practicing the sport she entered the Dutch championships. Strik was immediately asked to join the Dutch selection.

Strik has a personal preference for bench press and competes in this sport next to her powerlift competitions. In 2006, she broke the world record bench press, attaining a result of 182,5 kg. On 14 March 2010 she improved on her world record by half a kilogram to clear 183 kg. From 2004 up to and including 2007 she was both European and World record holder in bench pressing.

In powerlifting she attained the world record in both 2006 and 2007 with 3 gold medals each. Strik competes in the class up to 90 kg. The world record bench press for women above 90 kg was improved in 2010 by the Russian Irina Lugovaya, who pushed 205 kg, unheard of for a woman before then. At these same championships the Dutch Joanne Schaefer attained a short-lived world record of 202.5 kg. For competitors up to 90 kg, Strik still holds the world record with her result of 183 kg.

She represented the Netherlands at the 2022 World Games held in Birmingham, United States.

Strik had trainers and coaches of whom she's grateful, by her own account.

== Ten selected results ==
Year	Championship	Body weight	Squat	Bench press	Dead lift	Total weight	Result
2009	European championship Powerlifting	-90 kg	255	165	220	640 (kg)	1st
2009	Dutch championship Powerlifting	-90 kg	260*	172,5	232,5	665*	1st
2008	West-European championship Powerlifting	-90 kg	255	172,5	230	657,5	1st
2005	World championship Powerlifting	-82,5 kg	235	155	215	605	2nd
2004	Dutch championship Powerlifting	-82,5 kg	240	150	215	605	1st

- *=Dutch record.

Year	Championship	Bodyweight	Bench press	Result
2010	Dutch championship bench press	-90 kg	183	1st new world record
2008	World championship bench press	-90 kg	172,5 + 172,5	1st
2008	"Arnold Classic"	-90 kg	182,5	encore of world record 182,5 kg
2006	West-European championship powerlifting	-90 kg	182,5	world record
2004	World championships bench press	-90 kg	150 + 150	1st

== External links/sources ==
- Official website
- Wimwam.nl/women
