= Andrey Malanichev =

Russian Athlete

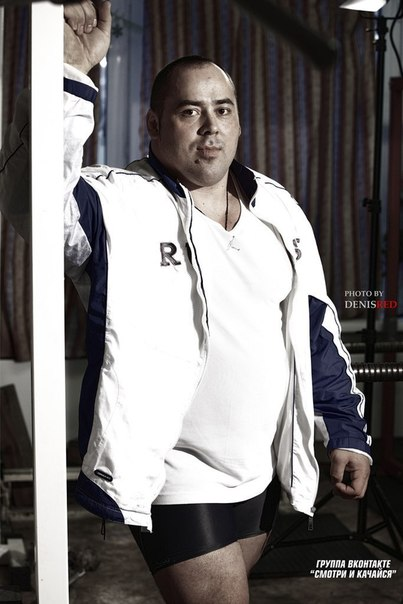

Personal information
- Born: January 10, 1977 (age 49) Barvikha, Moscow Oblast, Soviet Union
- Weight: 125–162.5 kg (276–358 lb)

Sport
- Sport: Powerlifting

Andrey Vladimirovich Malanichev (born January 10, 1977, in Moscow) is a Russian super-heavy weight powerlifter. Honored with Master of sports of Russia in powerlifting, he is a multiple World, European and Russian champion, and set 12 absolute all-time world records in all continents: Eurasia, Europe, America, Australia. He also set over 50 records in powerlifting, both internationally and nationally and won Cup of the Titans five times (2008, 2009, 2010, 2012, 2015), and Big Dogs two times (2016, 2017).

Malanichev held the all-time world record squat and total several times and is widely regarded as one of the greatest powerlifters of all time by many prestigious sport organisations including PowerliftingWatch.

== Career ==
Before starting a career in powerlifting Malanichev was fond of free style wrestling (competitively) and then competitive amateur boxing. By the time he got to a real lifting gym at 16 and started to train with his trainer Andrey Chuprin he could bench 80 kg and squat 120 kg.

Malanichev twice (2011 and 2014) was named as the "strongest lifter in the world" according to the authoritative world powerlifting forum PowerliftingWatch. He was repeatedly recognized as a unique athlete and was awarded for his contribution to the development of the sports industry and a healthy lifestyle. He won the Best Athlete of the Year 2015 according to the WRPF, the Best Athlete of the Year 2018 according to the Russian Powerlifting Union, as well as the winner of the first national FIT AWARDS 2017.

== Personal records ==
Raw:

- Squat (w/wraps) – 485 kg (1,069 lb) (2016 ProRaw Big Dogs I) (former world record)

→ former all-time world record in SHW class (+regardless of weight class) (stood until Vlad Alhazov's 500 kg (1,102 lb) in 2017)

- Bench press – 265 kg (584 lb) (2015 USPA Boss of Bosses II)
- Deadlift – 405 kg (893 lb) (2016 WRPF Pro Asian Cup)
- Total – 1,140 kg (2,513 lb) (485 + 255 + 400 kg (1,069 + 562 + 882 lb)) (2016 ProRaw Big Dogs I) (former world record)

→ former all-time world record in SHW class (+regardless of weight class) (stood until Dan Bell's 1,142.5 kg (2,519 lb) in 2019)

Equipped (single ply):

- Bench press – 305 kg (672 lb) (2014 SCT Super-Cup of Titans)
- Deadlift – 410 kg (904 lb) (2008 SCT Super-Cup of Titans)

== Track record ==
Year	Competition	Place	Weight class	Result
1997	Russian championship	Russia	110 kg	2
1998	Russian championship	Russia	110 kg	2
1998	Moscow Championship among juniors	Russia	110 kg	1
1998	World Championship	Hungary	125 kg	2
1999	Europe Championship	Poland	125 kg	1
1999	World Championship	Czech Republic	125 kg	2
2000	Чемпионат Москвы, Центра и Юга России	Russia	125 kg	1
2000	Чемпионат России среди юниоров	Russia	125 kg	1
2000	World Championship	Taiwan	125 kg	1
2000	Cup of Russia	Russia	125 kg	2
2001	Open Moscow Championship	Russia	125 kg	1
2001	Russian Championship among men	Russia	125 kg	1
2001	Europe Championship	Russia	125 kg	3
2001	Open Moscow Cup	Russia	125 kg	1
2001	World Championship	Finland	125 kg	2
2002	Russian Championship	Russia	125 kg	2
2002	Europe Championship	Sweden	125 kg	3
2002	World Championship	Slovakia	125 kg	1
2003	Russia Championship	Russia	125 kg	1
2003	Europe Championship	Bulgaria	125 kg	1
2003	World Championship	Denmark	125 kg	3
2004	Cup of Russia	Russia	125 kg	1
2005	Russian Championship	Russia	125 kg	1
2005	Europe Championship	Luxembourg	125 kg	2
2005	Russian Cup	Russia	125 kg	1
2005	World Championship	US	125 kg	2
2006	Russian Championship	Russia	125 kg	1
2008	Russian Championship	Russia	125 kg	1
2008	Super Cup of Titans	Russia	125 kg	1
2008	Cup of Russia	Russia	125 kg	1
2009	Super Cup of Titans	Russia	125 kg	1
2010	Super Cup of Titans	Russia	абсолютная категория	1
2010	RAW PRO World Championship WORLDLIFTING	Russia	+110 kg	1
2011	Super Cup of Titans	Russia	absolute score	2
2011	CAPO Tasmanian Powerlifting and Bench Press Championships 2011	Australia	absolute score	1
2012	Super Cup of Titans	Russia	absolute score	1
2013	Super Cup of Titans	Russia	absolute score	2
2013	GPA Powerlifting and Benchpress World Championships Tampere FINLAND	Finland	absolute score	1
2014	Super Cup of Titans	Russia	absolute score	2
2014	RAW UNITY MEET 7	US	absolute score	1
2015	Championship of Russia WRPF	Russia	absolute score	1
2015	Super Cup of Titans	Russia	absolute score	1
2015	Boss of the Bosses II Powerlifting Meet	US	absolute score	1
2015	WRP World Cup	Russia	absolute score	1
2016	Asia Champions Cup WRPF	Kazakhstan	absolute score	1
2016	Monsters Meet	Russia	absolute score	1
2016	ProRaw Big Dogs	Australia	absolute score	1
2017	ProRaw Big Dogs 2	Australia	absolute score	1
2018	World Championship in Powerlifting, Push pull double event, Bench Press, Folk Press, Deadlift and Armlifting by WRPF/WEPF/WAF	Russia	140+	1
2018	IPL World Powerlifting Championships and Single lifts and Olympia Pro Powerlifting Qualifiers	Russia	absolute score	1
2019	Open European Championships in powerlifting, push pull double event, bench press, folk bench press, deadlift and armlifting by WRPF / WEPF / WAF / RAU	Russia	absolute score	1
2019	Open powerlifting tournament TRIBUTE по версии USPA	US	total	1
