= Taylor Atwood =

American powerlifter

Personal information
- Nationality: United States
- Born: September 12, 1988 (age 37) Miami, Florida
- Education: Webber International University; Columbia Business School
- Height: 1.70 m (5 ft 7 in)
- Weight: 82.6 kg (182 lb)
- Children: 1

Sport
- Country: United States (2014–present)
- Sport: Powerlifting
- Event: 83 kg (183 lb)
- Coached by: Jason Tremblay

Achievements and titles
- Personal bests: Squat: 317.5 kg (700 lb) (2025); Bench Press: 216 kg (476 lb) (2025); Deadlift: 342.5 kg (755 lb) (2025); Total: 876 kg (1,931 lb) (2025)
Medal record
Men's powerlifting
Representing United States
IPF World Classic Powerlifting Championships
Silver medal – second place	2016 Killeen	– 74 kg
Silver medal – second place	2017 Minsk	– 74 kg
Gold medal – first place	2018 Calgary	– 74 kg
Gold medal – first place	2019 Helsingborg	– 74 kg
Gold medal – first place	2022 Sun City	– 74 kg
Bronze medal – third place	2023 St. Julian's	– 74 kg
SBD Sheffield Powerlifting Championships
5th	2023 Sheffield	Absolute
Powerlifting America Raw Nationals
Gold medal – first place	2022 Austin	– 74 kg
Silver medal – second place	2025 Atlanta	– 83 kg
USA Powerlifting Raw Nationals
Gold medal – first place	2014 Aurora	– 74 kg
Gold medal – first place	2015 Scranton	– 74 kg
Gold medal – first place	2016 Atlanta	– 74 kg
Gold medal – first place	2017 Orlando	– 74 kg
Gold medal – first place	2018 Spokane	– 74 kg
Gold medal – first place	2019 Lombard	– 74 kg
Gold medal – first place	2021 Daytona Beach	– 74 kg

Taylor Atwood (born September 12, 1988) is an American powerlifter. He is a 3-time IPF World Champion and has held multiple world records in the 74 kilogram weight class.

== Powerlifting career ==
Atwood competed in his first recorded strength competition in high school in 2007, where he clean and jerked 270 lbs and bench pressed 335 lbs. Atwood competed in his first powerlifting competition in 2013, and won his first Nationals from USA Powerlifting in 2014. In 2015, he was disqualified from the 2015 Arnold Classic for failing to register a squat. The same year, Atwood suffered a back injury, but was able to recover and win a second time at Raw Nationals.

In 2016, Atwood competed at the IPF Classic World Powerlifting Championships for the first time with only 3 months of preparation. At the competition, he secured the total world record of 722.5 kg (1,593 lb), which would shortly be surpassed by competitor Aliaksandr Hrynkevich-Sudnik of Belarus. Atwood would secure second place at the competition.

At the 2017 Classic World Powerlifting Championships, Atwood squatted 265.5 kg (585 lb), which would be shortly surpassed by Yoshihiro Higa of Japan. Atwood secured second place at the competition, losing to Kjell Egil Bakkelund.

At the 2018 Classic World Powerlifting Championships, Atwood would secure his first win at the championships, where he totaled 758 kg (1,671 lb) for a world record, alongside squatting 275.5 kg (607 lb) for an open world record, which would once again be shortly surpassed by Yoshihiro Higa of Japan.

In 2019, Atwood would secure a second win at the 2019 IPF World Classic Powerlifting Championships, where he extended his total world record to 790.5 kg (1,743 lb), and squatted 283 kg (624 lb) for a world record, and would score the highest IPF score of the entire men's competition.

In 2021, Atwood competed at USA Powerlifting Raw Nationals, where he secured three world records (squat, deadlift and total respectively), and securing a total that is 11-times his own bodyweight.

In 2022, Atwood would win his third competition in the IPF by totaling 790 kg (1,740 lb), 0.5 kilograms below his world record, and qualified for the inaugural SBD Sheffield Powerlifting Championships. At the championships on March 25, 2023, Atwood placed 5th in the competition, failing to surpass a world record. At the 2023 IPF World Championships, Atwood secured third place at the competition, 0.5 kilograms behind second and first place.

In 2024, Atwood announced that he would not be competing that year due to a knee injury he is recovering from. He underwent Platelet-rich plasma therapy in late-2023.

== Personal life ==
Atwood was born in Miami, Florida and graduated from American Heritage School. Atwood attended Webber International University and earned a bachelor's degree in Science in Business Administration in 2011. At the university, Atwood took part in American Football in a running back position. Following graduation, Atwood applied at Columbia Business School, where he received his Master of Business Administration (MBA) degree.

In October 2021, Atwood announced on Instagram that he has become a father to a boy named Owen.

== Personal records ==
=== Competition bests ===
- Squat – 317.5 kg (700 lbs)
- Bench Press – 202.5 kg (481.7 lbs)
- Deadlift – 342.5 kg (755.2 lbs)
- Total – 876 kg (1,931.6 lbs)

=== Record lifts in competition ===
- Squat – 283 kg (623.9 lbs) – IPF Raw Open World Record – 6/13/2019
- Total – 790.5 kg (1,742.8 lbs) – IPF Raw Open World Record – 6/13/2019
- Bench Press – 199 kg (438.7 lbs) – USA Powerlifting Open American Record – 10/18/2020
- Squat – 303 kg (668 lbs) – USA Powerlifting Open American Record – 6/14/2021
- Deadlift – 340.5 kg (750.7 lbs) – USA Powerlifting Open American Record – 6/14/2021
- Total – 838.5 kg (1,848.6 lbs) – USA Powerlifting Open American Record – 6/14/2021
- Bench Press – 202.5 kg (446.4 lbs) – Powerlifting America Open Raw National Record – 4/1/2022

=== Record lifts in training ===
- Bench Press – 475 lbs (215.4 kg) – 12/19/2022
- Deadlift w/ straps – 350 kg (771.6 lbs) – 10/23/2020

== External use ==
- Taylor Atwood on Instagram.
- Taylor Atwood on YouTube.
