= Ray Orlando Williams =

American powerlifter (born 1986)

Ray Williams
Personal information
- Born: September 15, 1986 (age 39) Demopolis, Alabama, United States
- Height: 6 ft 1 in (1.85 m)
- Weight: 198.6 kg (438 lb)

Sport
- Sport: Powerlifting
Medal record
Men's powerlifting
Representing United States
IPF World Classic Powerlifting Championships
Gold medal – first place	2014 Potchefstroom	– 120+ kg
Gold medal – first place	2015 Salo	– 120+ kg
Gold medal – first place	2016 Killeen	– 120+ kg
Gold medal – first place	2017 Minsk	– 120+ kg
Gold medal – first place	2018 Calgary	– 120+ kg
DNF	2019 Helsinborg	– 120+ kg
NAPF North American Powerlifting Championships
Gold medal – first place	2023 Cayman Islands	– 120+ kg
Gold medal – first place	2024 Scottsdale	– 120+ kg
Powerlifing America Classic Open Nationals
Gold medal – first place	2023 Austin	– 120+ kg
Gold medal – first place	2024 Reno	– 120+ kg
Disqualified	2025 College Park	– 120+ kg
USA Powerlifting Raw Nationals
Gold medal – first place	2013 Orlando	– 120+ kg
Silver medal – second place	2014 Colorado	– 120+ kg
Gold medal – first place	2015 Scranton	– 120+ kg
Gold medal – first place	2016 Atlanta	– 120+ kg
Gold medal – first place	2017 Orlando	– 120+ kg
Gold medal – first place	2018 Calgary	– 120+ kg
Gold medal – first place	2019 Lombard	– 120+ kg

Ray Orlando Williams (born September 15, 1986) is an American powerlifter who previously held the world record for the heaviest raw squat at 490 kg (1,080 lb). Williams is a five-time IPF classic world powerlifting champion, as well as a six-time USA Powerlifting national champion, and two-time Powerlifting America national champion.

== Career ==
Williams broke the raw squat world record (with the use of only a belt and knee sleeves) for the first time in 2016 when he squatted 438 kg (966 lb) at the 2016 IPF World Classic Powerlifting Championships in Killeen, Texas. Even though Don Reinhoudt squatted 423.9 kg (934.5 lb) in 1976 (using ace bandages), it is this lift from Williams which is regarded to have broken Paul Anderson's 51-year old raw squat record of 421.4 kg (929.0 lb) from 1965. Four months later, he became the first man to squat 1,000 pounds with only knee sleeves when he squatted 456 kg (1,005 lb) during the 2016 USAPL Raw Nationals. Williams continued to break the raw squat world record, squatting 477.5 kg (1,053 lb) in 2017, 485 kg (1,069 lb) in 2018 and 490 kg (1,080 lb) in 2019. His record-breaking 490 kg squat was surpassed in 2026 by Devonte Lewis with 490.5 kg (1,081 lb) at USAPL Raw Nationals.

Williams also broke the IPF deadlift world record twice when he deadlifted 392.5 kg (865 lb) in 2017, breaking John Kuc's 38-year old IPF record and extended it to 398.5 kg (879 lb) in 2018 which stood until Jesus Olivares deadlifted 399 kg (880 lb) in 2023.

In June 2025, Williams received a 16-month suspension after testing positive for heptaminol, a prohibited substance by the USADA. His first place performance at the 2025 Powerlifting America Raw Nationals was also annulled.

== Personal records ==
- Squat – 490 kg (1,080 lb) (2019 USAPL Arnold SBD Pro American)
- Bench press – 247.5 kg (546 lb) (2019 USAPL Arnold SBD Pro American)
- Deadlift – 398.5 kg (879 lb) (2018 IPF World Classic Powerlifting Championships)
- Total – 1,112.5 kg (2,453 lb) (2019 USAPL Arnold SBD Pro American)
