= Daniella Melo =

American powerlifter

Medal record

Women's powerlifting

Representing United States

World Classic Championships
Gold medal – first place	2018 Calgary	84 kg
Silver medal – second place	2019 Helsingborg	84 kg

Daniella Melo (born September 26, 1998) is an American powerlifter, who secured first place at the 2018 IPF World Classic Powerlifting Championship in Calgary. In 2019, she secured silver medal after securing the same total as first place's Amanda Lawrence, but lost due to higher body weight (83.05 vs 83.55 kg). At the championship, she has set up new world record in bench press.
