= Russel Orhii =

American powerlifter

Personal information
- Nationality: American
- Born: December 9, 1994 (age 31) San Antonio, Texas, U.S.
- Height: 1.71 m (5 ft 7 in)
- Weight: 91.8 kg (202 lb)

Sport
- Country: United States (2015–2021; 2022–present); United States Virgin Islands (2021)
- Sport: Powerlifting
- Event: 93 kg
- Coached by: Joseph Ferratti

Achievements and titles
- Personal bests: Squat: 355.5 kg (2025); Bench Press: 207.5 kg (2025); Deadlift: 355 kg (2025); Total: 918 kg (2025)
Medal record
Men's powerlifting
Representing United States
IPF World Classic Powerlifting Championships
Silver medal – second place	2018 Calgary	– 83 kg
Gold medal – first place	2019 Helsingborg	– 83 kg
Silver medal – second place	2024 Druskininkai	– 83 kg
Powerlifting America Raw Nationals
Gold medal – first place	2024 Reno	– 83 kg
USA Powerlifting Raw Nationals
Gold medal – first place	2017 Orlando	– 83 kg
Gold medal – first place	2018 Spokane	– 83 kg
Gold medal – first place	2019 Lombard	– 83 kg
Gold medal – first place	2021 Daytona Beach	– 83 kg
Gold medal – first place	2022 Las Vegas	– 82.5 kg
Representing United States Virgin Islands
IPF World Classic Powerlifting Championships
Gold medal – first place	2021 Halmstad	– 83 kg

Russel Tiza Orhii (born December 9, 1994) is an American powerlifter competing in the 93 kilogram weight class. He previously won the IPF World Championships twice, USA Powerlifting Raw Nationals five times, and Powerlifting America Raw Nationals once in the 83 kilogram weight class.

== Powerlifting career ==
Orhii competed in his first powerlifting competition in 2015, and competed in bodybuilding in 2016.

In 2018, Orhii qualified for the IPF World Classic Powerlifting Championships, and competed in the open as a junior (23-years-old). He would squat an open world record of 298.5 kilograms, which would shortly be surpassed by Brett Gibbs. Orhii would secure second place at the competition.

In 2019, Orhii qualified a second time, where he became IPF World Champion in the 83 kilogram weight class. He would also break the world record squat with 313 kilograms and a world record 833 kilogram total.

In 2021, the IPF suspended and later expelled USA Powerlifting for non-compliance with their anti-doping code. American athletes were ineligible to compete at the 2021 IPF World Championships. Orhii was eligible to compete but represented the United States Virgin Islands. Orhii would win the IPF World Championships for a second time, and would break his own squat world record, the deadlift world record and break his own total world record.

In 2022, Orhii would withdraw from competing in the IPF in favor of USA Powerlifting. Competing in the 82.5 kilogram weight class, Orhii competed at the 2022 USA Powerlifting Mega Nationals, where he would secure first place, and would break the squat and total American Record.

In 2023, Orhii withdrew from the USA Powerlifting nationals to compete in the IPF again. IPF rules disallow athletes who compete outside an IPF-affiliated meet for 6 months, which forced Orhii to withdraw from USA Powerlifting Nationals to compete in Powerlifting America Nationals, a qualification meet for IPF Worlds. At the 2024 Powerlifting America nationals, Orhii unofficially broke three IPF world records and secured first place.

In 2024, Orhii competed at the IPF Classic powerlifting world championships, where he squatted 321 kilograms to break his own world record. He would secure a silver medal with a total of 843.5 kilograms, which would be a world record, before being surpassed by gold medalist Jurins Kengamu of Great Britain with a total of 845 kilograms.

On January 26, 2025, Orhii competed at the 2025 SBD Sheffield Powerlifting Championships, where he squatted 338 kilograms to break his own world record twice (after squatting 323 kilograms for his second attempt). He would secure a new total world record of 870.5 kilograms. With his total being 101.10% of the previous world record, he secured fourth place. On July 31, Orhii graduated to the 93 kilogram weight class, where he totaled 918 kilograms and squatted 355.5 kilograms for an open world record at the 2025 Pan-American Classic Powerlifting Championships.

=== Business ===
Orhii is the founder of Corrupted Strength, a powerlifting gym in Stafford, Texas, which opened in 2021. Before its opening, Orhii ran a powerlifting mock meet in the gym. The gym would close in 2023 due to Orhii's landlord refusing to renew the lease.

== Personal life ==
Russel Tiza Orhii was born on December 9, 1994 in San Antonio, Texas and shortly moved to Houston where he grew up. He is the son of Nigerian politician Paul Orhii.

== Personal records ==
=== Competition bests ===
- Squat – 355.5 kg (783.7 lbs)
- Bench Press – 207.5 kg (457.4 lbs)
- Deadlift – 355 kg (782.6 lbs)
- Total – 918 kg (2,032.8 lbs)

=== Record lifts in competition ===
- Squat – 301 kg (663.6 lbs) – USA Powerlifting Junior American Record (83 kg) – 10/11/2018
- Squat – 323 kg (712.1 lbs) – USA Powerlifting Open American Record (83 kg) – 6/14/2021
- Total – 843 kg (1,858.5 lbs) – USA Powerlifting Open American Record (83 kg) – 6/14/2021
- Deadlift – 333 kg (734.1 lbs) – IPF Open Classic World Record (83 kg) – 9/30/2021
- Squat – 320.5 kg (706.6 lbs) – USA Powerlifting Open American Record (82.5 kg) – 6/8/2022
- Total – 838 kg (1,847.5 lbs) – USA Powerlifting Open American Record (82.5 kg) – 6/8/2022
- Squat – 321 kg (707.7 lbs) – IPF Open Classic World Record (83 kg) – 6/18/2024
- Total – 844.5 kg (1,861.8 lbs) – IPF Open Classic World Record (83 kg) – 6/18/2024
- Squat – 355.5 kg (783.7 lbs) – IPF Open Classic World Record (93 kg) – 7/31/2025
- Total – 918 kg (2,032.8 lbs) – IPF Open Classic World Record (93 kg) – 7/31/2025

== External use ==
- Russel Orhii's profile on YouTube.
- Russel Orhii's profile on TikTok.
- Russel Orhii's profile on Instagram.
- Russel Orhii's profile on X / Twitter.
