= Blaine Sumner =

American powerlifter

Personal information
- Nickname: "Vanilla Gorilla"
- Born: Blaine Sumner; June 22, 1987 (age 39) Conifer, Colorado, United States
- Occupations: Petroleum engineer, powerlifter
- Height: 6 ft 2 in (1.88 m)
- Weight: 385 lb (175 kg)
- Website: Official website

Competition record

Powerlifting

Representing United States

IPF World Classic Powerlifting Championships
Gold medal – first place	2012	+120kg
Silver medal – second place	2015	+120kg

IPF World Equipped Powerlifting Championships
6th	2012	+120kg
Silver medal – second place	2015	+120kg
Gold medal – first place	2016	+120kg
Silver medal – second place	2018	+120kg
Gold medal – first place	2019	+120kg

NAPF RegionalChampionships
Gold medal – first place	2016	+120kg

USAPL National Championships
1st	2007 Teen	+125kg
1st	2010 Juniors	+125kg
2nd	2010	+125kg
1st	2012	+120kg
1st	2015	+120kg
1st	2016	+120kg
1st	2018	+120kg
1st	2019	+120kg

USAPL Raw National Championships
1st	2010 Juniors	+125kg
1st	2010	+125kg
2nd	2011	+125kg
2nd	2013	+120kg
1st	2014	+120kg

IPF Pacific Raw Invitational
1st	2012	+120kg
1st	2015	+120kg

Arnold Classic Powerlifting
1st	2014	+120kg

Arnold Equipped Powerlifting
1st	2012	+120kg
1st	2014	+120kg
1st	2016	+120kg
1st	2017	+120kg
2nd	2019	+120kg
1st	2020	+120kg

USAPL National Bench Press Championships
1st	2007 Juniors	+125kg
1st	2014	+120kg
1st	2019	+120kg

Blaine Sumner (born June 22, 1987) is an American world champion powerlifter from Conifer, Colorado, currently residing in Gillette, Wyoming, United States.

== Powerlifting ==
Sumner was the 2016 and 2019 IPF Open World Champion in the 120+ kilogram weight class and was the first American male to win a gold medal in the IPF Classic World Championships in 2012. He was the 2012, 2015, 2016, 2018, and 2019 USAPL Superheavyweight Equipped Champion and Champion of Champions across all weight classes in 4 of those 5 years.

Sumner has set 28 World Records in the classic squat, classic total, and equipped squat, equipped bench press, and equipped total. He has won thirteen National Championships and set 42 American Records in the classic squat, classic total, equipped squat, equipped bench press, equipped total, junior raw squat, junior raw deadlift, junior raw total, and junior equipped squat.

Sumner has the highest single ply total of all time across all federations (including untested federations) of 1,296 kg (2,857 lbs). Including all triple ply lifters in all federations this ranks Sumner, with a single ply tested total, as the #4 of all time. Sumner's squat of 515 kg (1,135 lbs) is the heaviest single-ply squat of all time.

In what may be the most athletic display ever by a powerlifter, at the 2014 Arnold Sports Festival Sumner competed in 3 competitions over 3 consecutive days winning 2 gold medals, setting one world record, two American records, and winning best overall lifter.

On March 5, 2016 Sumner made history at the Arnold Sports Festival when he broke 6 IPF World Records. He became the first lifter in IPF history to squat 500 kg (1,102 lbs) breaking the existing record by 22 lbs. He then broke 3 bench press records finishing with 401.5 kg (885 lbs) which broke the existing record by 67 lbs. Sumner finished by breaking the record total twice. His final total was 2,803 lbs shattering the existing record by 91 lbs. This calculates to the highest Wilks score in IPF history of 692.2.

Sumner became the first lifter across all powerlifting federations to bench press over 1,000 lbs in single ply gear on March 2, 2019. This broke his own record by 88 lbs.

== Football ==
Sumner played collegiate football at the Colorado School of Mines from 2006 to 2011 as a nose guard and short yardage fullback. He was multiple time All-RMAC, NFF All-Colorado, and Don Hansen All-Region. Subsequent to his senior year he broke the NFL record for bench press reps with 52 at his Pro Day. Sumner also turned in a 33" vertical jump and 10' broad jump for an NFL Pro Day record Kirwan Explosive Index of 95. Sumner was not signed by any NFL team.

== Other athletic achievements ==
Sumner competed in four sports in high school earning Conference MVP awards in both football and wrestling; team MVP awards in football, wrestling, and lacrosse; and setting school records in football, wrestling, lacrosse, and track/field.

== Personal life ==
Sumner graduated from Conifer High School in 2006 and Colorado School of Mines in 2010. He lives in Gillette, Wyoming and is a petroleum engineer.

In addition to his competitive powerlifting career, Blaine also is a published author in the powerlifting field and provides coaching to other powerlifters.

== Personal competition records ==
=== Equipped ===
- Squat - 1,135 pounds (515 kg)
- Bench press (single lift) - 1,003 pounds (455 kg)
- Bench press - 939 pounds (426 kg)
- Deadlift - 816 pounds (370 kg)
- Total - 2,857 pounds (1,296 kg)

=== Raw (Classic) ===
- Squat - 915 pounds (415 kg)
- Bench press - 530 pounds (240 kg)
- Deadlift - 766 pounds (347 kg)
- Total - 2,210 pounds (1,002.5 kg)

=== Record lifts in competition ===
- Total - 1,846 pounds (837 kg) - USAPL Teen American Record +125 kg - 6/3/2007
- Squat - 771 pounds (350 kg) - USAPL Raw Open American Record +125 kg - 3/20/2010
- Squat - 771 pounds (350 kg) - USAPL Raw Junior American Record +125 kg - 3/20/2010
- Deadlift - 672 pounds (305 kg) - USAPL Raw Junior American Record +125 kg - 3/20/2010
- Total - 1,868 pounds (847 kg) - USAPL Raw Junior American Record +125 kg - 3/20/2010
- Squat - 903 pounds (410 kg) - USAPL Junior American Record +125 kg - 6/20/2010
- Squat- 804 pounds (365 kg) - USAPL Raw Open American Record +125 kg - 7/18/2010
- Squat- 804 pounds (365 kg) - USAPL Raw Junior American Record +125 kg - 7/18/2010
- Deadlift - 705 pounds (320 kg) - USAPL Raw Junior American Record +125 kg - 7/18/2010
- Total - 1,940 pounds (880 kg) - USAPL Raw Junior American Record +125 kg - 7/18/2010
- Squat - 854 pounds (387 kg) - USAPL Raw Open American Record +125 kg - 8/21/2011
- Squat - 975 pounds (442 kg) - IPF Open World Record +120 kg - 3/3/2012
- Squat - 805 pounds (365 kg) - IPF Raw Open World Record +120 kg - 4/1/2012
- Squat - 843 pounds (382 kg) - IPF Raw Open World Record +120 kg - 4/1/2012
- Squat - 881 pounds (400 kg) - IPF Raw Open World Record +120 kg - 4/1/2012
- Squat - 881 pounds (400 kg) - USAPL Raw Open American Record +125 kg - 4/1/2012
- Tota l- 1,995 pounds (905 kg) - IPF Raw Open World Record +120 kg - 4/1/2012
- Total - 2,056 pounds (933 kg) - IPF Raw Open World Record +120 kg - 4/1/2012
- Squat - 1,003 pounds (455 kg) - USAPL Open American Record +125 kg - 6/24/2012
- Total - 2,066 pounds (937 kg) - IPF Raw Open World Record +120 kg - 2/28/2014
- Squat - 1,008 pounds (457 kg) - USAPL Open American Record +120 kg - 3/1/2014
- Bench Press - 782 pounds (355 kg) - USAPL Open American Record +120 kg - 3/1/2014
- Squat - 1,025 pounds (465 kg) - USAPL Open American Record +120 kg - 5/17/2015
- Squat - 1,069 pounds (485 kg) - USAPL Open American Record +120 kg - 5/17/2015
- Bench Press - 805 pounds (365 kg) - USAPL Open American Record +120 kg - 5/17/2015
- Bench Press - 827 pounds (375 kg) - USAPL Open American Record +120 kg - 5/17/2015
- Total - 2,613 pounds (1,185 kg) - USAPL Open American Record +120 kg - 5/17/2015
- Total - 2,656 pounds (1,205 kg) - USAPL Open American Record +120 kg - 5/17/2015
- Total - 2,210 pounds (1,000 kg) - USAPL Raw Open American Record +120 kg - 9/12/2015
- Total - 2,210 pounds (1,000 kg) - IPF Raw Open World Record +120 kg - 9/12/2015
- Squat - 1,102 pounds (500 kg) - USAPL Open American Record +120 kg - 3/5/2016
- Bench Press - 885 pounds (401.5 kg) - USAPL Open American Record +120 kg - 3/5/2016
- Bench Press (Single Lift) - 885 pounds (401.5 kg) - USAPL Open American Record +120 kg - 3/5/2016
- Total - 2,715 pounds (1,231.5 kg) - USAPL Open American Record +120 kg - 3/5/2016
- Total - 2,803 pounds (1,271.5 kg) - USAPL Open American Record +120 kg - 3/5/2016
- Squat - 1,102 pounds (500 kg) - IPF Open World Record +120 kg - 3/5/2016
- Bench Press - 827 pounds (375 kg) - IPF Open World Record +120 kg - 3/5/2016
- Bench Press - 885 pounds (401.5 kg) - IPF Open World Record +120 kg - 3/5/2016
- Bench Press (Single Lift)- 885 pounds (401.5 kg) - IPF Open World Record +120 kg - 3/5/2016
- Total - 2,715 pounds (1231.5 kg) - IPF Open World Record +120 kg - 3/5/2016
- Total - 2,803 pounds (1271.5 kg) - IPF Open World Record +120 kg - 3/5/2016
- Squat - 1,113 pounds (505 kg) - USAPL Open American Record +120 kg - 3/4/2017
- Bench Press - 904 pounds (410 kg) - USAPL Open American Record +120 kg - 3/4/2017
- Bench Press (Single Lift) - 904 pounds (410 kg) - USAPL Open American Record +120 kg - 3/4/2017
- Total - 2,805 pounds (1,272.5 kg) - USAPL Open American Record +120 kg - 3/4/2017
- Squat - 1,113 pounds (505 kg) - IPF Open World Record +120 kg - 3/4/2017
- Bench Press - 904 pounds (410 kg) - IPF Open World Record +120 kg - 3/4/2017
- Bench Press (Single Lift) - 904 pounds (410 kg) - IPF Open World Record +120 kg - 3/4/2017
- Total - 2,805 pounds (1,272.5 kg) - IPF Open World Record +120 kg - 3/4/2017
- Bench Press - 915 pounds (415 kg) - USAPL Open American Record +120 kg - 11/10/2018
- Bench Press (Single Lift) - 915 pounds (415 kg) - USAPL Open American Record +120 kg - 11/10/2018
- Bench Press - 915 pounds (415 kg) - IPF Open World Record +120 kg - 11/10/2018
- Bench Press (Single Lift) - 915 pounds (415 kg) - IPF Open World Record +120 kg - 11/10/2018
- Bench Press (Single Lift) - 937 pounds (425 kg) - USAPL Open American Record +120 kg - 3/2/2019
- Bench Press (Single Lift) - 1,003 pounds (455 kg) - USAPL Open American Record +120 kg - 3/2/2019
- Bench Press - 937 pounds (425 kg) - USAPL Open American Record +120 kg - 3/2/2019
- Bench Press - 937 pounds (425 kg) - USAPL Open American Record +120 kg - 5/12/19
- Bench Press (Single Lift) - 938 pounds (425.5 kg) - IPF Open World Record +120 kg - 11/23/19
- Bench Press - 938 pounds (425.5 kg) - IPF Open World Record +120 kg - 11/23/19
- Total - 2,812 pounds (1,275.5 kg) - IPF Open World Record +120 kg - 11/23/19
- Squat - 1,135 pounds (515.0 kg) - USAPL Open American Record +120 kg - 3/7/2020
- Total - 2,813 pounds (1,276.0 kg) - USAPL Open American Record +120 kg - 3/7/20
- Total - 2,857 pounds (1,296.0 kg) - USAPL Open American Record +120 kg - 3/7/20
- Squat - 1,135 pounds (515.0 kg) - IPF Open World Record +120 kg - 3/7/2020
- Bench Press (Single Lift) - 939 pounds (426.0 kg) - IPF Open World Record +120 kg - 3/7/20
- Bench Press - 939 pounds (426.0 kg) - IPF Open World Record +120 kg - 3/7/20
- Total - 2,813 pounds (1,276.0 kg) - IPF Open World Record +120 kg - 3/7/20
- Total - 2,857 pounds (1,296.0 kg) - IPF Open World Record +120 kg - 3/7/20
