= Jesus Olivares =

American powerlifter (born 1998)

Personal information
- Born: June 5, 1998 (age 28) Mexico
- Education: Permian High School
- Height: 185 cm (6 ft 1 in)
- Weight: 190.4 kg (420 lb)
- Children: 2

Sport
- Country: United States (2013–2021; 2022–present); United States Virgin Islands (2021)
- Sport: Powerlifting
- Event: 120+ kg
- Coached by: Joseph Ferratti

Achievements and titles
- Personal bests: Squat: 485 kg (2026); Bench Press: 281.5 kg (2026); Deadlift: 417.5 kg (2026); Total: 1,154 kg (2026)
Medal record
Men's powerlifting
Representing United States
IPF World Classic Powerlifting Championships
Gold medal – first place	2022 Sun City	– 120+ kg
Gold medal – first place	2023 St. Julian's	– 120+ kg
Gold medal – first place	2024 Druskininkai	– 120+ kg
Gold medal – first place	2025 Chemnitz	– 120+ kg
Gold medal – first place	2026 Druskininkai	– 120+ kg
SBD Sheffield Powerlifting Championships
Gold medal – first place	2023 Sheffield	Absolute
11th	2024 Sheffield	Absolute
9th	2025 Sheffield	Absolute
Powerlifing America Classic Open Nationals
Gold medal – first place	2022 Austin	– 120+ kg
Gold medal – first place	2026 Lake Tahoe	– 120+ kg
Powerlifting America SBD Austin
Bronze medal – third place	2025 Austin	Absolute
USA Powerlifting Raw Nationals
Gold medal – first place	2021 Daytona Beach	– 120+ kg
Representing United States Virgin Islands
IPF World Classic Powerlifting Championships
Gold medal – first place	2021 Halmstad	– 120+ kg

Jesus Olivares (born June 5, 1998) is an American powerlifter. He is the reigning world champion at the IPF World Classic Powerlifting Championships in the 120+ kilogram weight class, having won six competitions.

In 2023, Olivares held the heaviest raw total in powerlifting history regardless of federation or drug testing with 1,152.5 kilograms, and extended it to 1,153.5 kilograms in 2025.

== Powerlifting career ==
In 2021, Olivares made his IPF debut. He competed in the open category despite being a junior (23-years-old). He broke four International Powerlifting Federation world junior records, squatting 427.5 kilograms, bench pressing 252.5 kilograms for a full power and bench press only junior record, and a totaled 1,045 kilograms for a junior record, and would win his first gold medal.

On March 25, 2023, Olivares squatted 470 kilograms, bench pressed 272.5 kilograms, and deadlifted a world record 410 kilograms, for a total of 1,152.5 kilograms at the inaugural SBD Sheffield Powerlifting Championships, setting the IPF world record for the highest raw total and the then-highest raw total in powerlifting history regardless of drug testing.

On February 10, 2024, Olivares squatted 478 kilograms at the second annual SBD Sheffield Powerlifting Championships, surpassing Ray Williams's IPF squat world record that had stood since 2017. On the bench press, Olivares failed his second and third attempt of 275 kilograms on the bench press with a final performance of 255 kilograms. On the deadlift, Olivares's first and third attempts were failed and only succeeded in a 380 kilogram deadlift. He would place 11th overall.

On November 22, 2025, Olivares competed at the Powerlifting America SBD Austin event, where he squatted 478.5 kilograms and totaled 1,153.5 kilograms for an American record and an unofficial IPF world record. His record-heaviest total would be surpassed by Colton Engelbrecht, who totaled 1,155 kilograms at the WRPF Start 800 Powerlifting Tournament in Krasnoyarsk, Russia, on March 23, 2026.

On October 4, 2026, Olivares squatted 485 kilograms and totaled 1,154 kilograms for an unofficial IPF world record at Avancus Houston. Alongside his 281.5 kilogram bench press, all lifts were American records under Powerlifting America.

== Personal life ==
Olivares lives in Texas and has graduated from Permian High School. His younger brother Pablo Olivares is also an active 120+ kg powerlifter, and has totaled 950 kilograms at Powerlifting America Raw Nationals in 2024.

== Personal records ==
=== Competition bests ===
- Squat - 485 kg (1,069 lb) (2026 PA Avancus Houston)
- Bench Press - 281.5 kg (621 lb) (2026 PA Avancus Houston)
- Deadlift - 417.5 kg (920 lb) (2026 PA Open Nationals)
- Total - 1,154 kg (2,544 lb) (2026 PA Avancus Houston)

=== Record lifts in competition ===
- Deadlift - 400 kg (881 lbs) - USA Powerlifting Junior National Record +120 kg - 12/12/2020
- Total - 1,055 kg (2,325 lbs) - USA Powerlifting Junior National Record +120 kg - 12/12/2020
- Bench Press - 250 kg (551 lbs) - USA Powerlifting Junior Full Power National Record +120 kg - 6/14/2021
- Bench Press - 250 kg (551 lbs) - USA Powerlifting Junior Bench Press National Record +120 kg - 6/14/2021
- Squat - 427.5 kg (942 lbs) - IPF Raw Junior World Record +120 kg - 9/23/2021
- Bench Press - 252.5 kg (556 lbs) - IPF Raw Junior Full Power World Record +120 kg - 9/23/2021
- Bench Press - 252.5 kg (556 lbs) - IPF Raw Junior Bench Press World Record +120 kg - 9/23/2021
- Total - 1,045 kg (2,303 lbs) - IPF Raw Junior World Record +120 kg - 9/23/2021
- Deadlift - 410 kg (904 lbs) - IPF Raw Open World Record +120 kg - 3/25/2023
- Total - 1,152.5 kg (2,542 lbs) - IPF Raw Open World Record +120 kg - 3/25/2023
- Squat - 478 kg (1,054 lbs) - IPF Raw Open World Record +120 kg - 2/10/2024
- Deadlift - 417.5 kg (920.4 lbs) - Powerlifting America Raw American Record +120 kg - 3/8/2026
- Squat - 485 kg (1,069 lbs) - Powerlifting America Raw American Record +120 kg - 10/4/2026
- Bench Press - 281.5 kg (621 lbs) - Powerlifting America Raw American Record +120 kg - 10/4/2026
- Total - 1,154 kg (2,544 lbs) - Powerlifting America Raw American Record +120 kg - 10/4/2026

=== Records in training ===
- Deadlift - 430 kg (948 lb) - 11/5/2026
