= Amanda Lawrence (powerlifter) =

American powerlifter

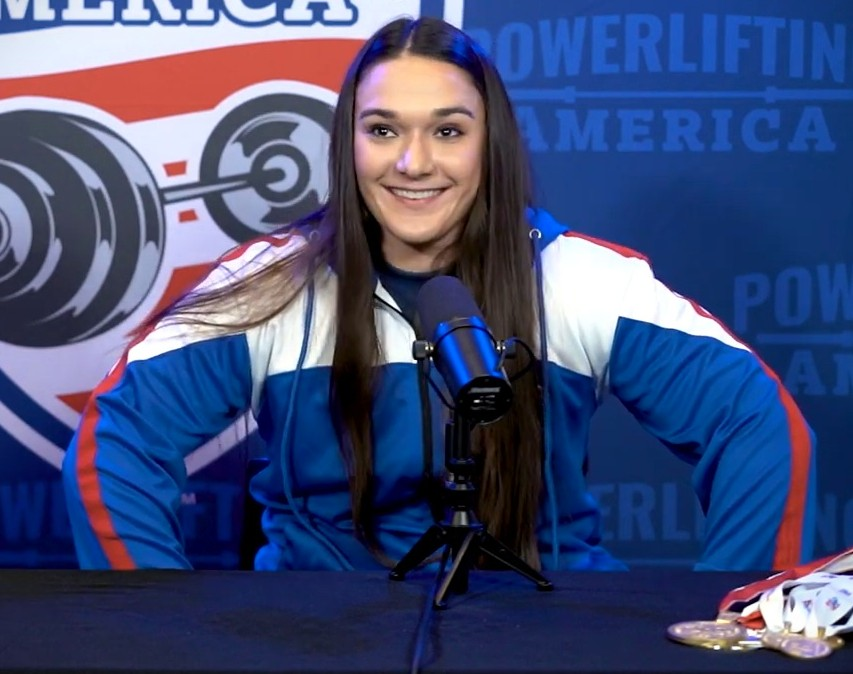
- Lawrence in 2023

Personal information
- Born: May 6, 1997 (age 29)
- Height: 173 cm (5 ft 8 in)
- Weight: 83.9 kg (185 lb)

Sport
- Sport: Powerlifting
Medal record
Women's powerlifting
Representing United States
IPF Women's Classic Powerlifting Championships
Gold medal – first place	2019 Helsingborg	84 kg
Gold medal – first place	2021 Halmstad	84 kg
Gold medal – first place	2022 Sun City	84 kg
Gold medal – first place	2023 St. Julian's	84 kg
Gold medal – first place	2024 Druskininkai	84 kg
Gold medal – first place	2025 Chemnitz	84 kg
SBD Sheffield Powerlifting Championships
4th	2023 Sheffield	Absolute
11th	2024 Sheffield	Absolute
5th	2025 Sheffield	Absolute
7th	2026 Sheffield	Absolute

Amanda Lawrence (born May 6, 1997) is an American powerlifter who won six gold medals at the IPF World Classic Powerlifting Championships in the 84 kg category. During the championship, she set three world records (squat, deadlift and total). In 2019, she tied with second-placed Daniella Melo, but won due to lower body weight (83.05 vs 83.55 kg).

Lawrence at 2025 Sheffield Powerlifting Championships

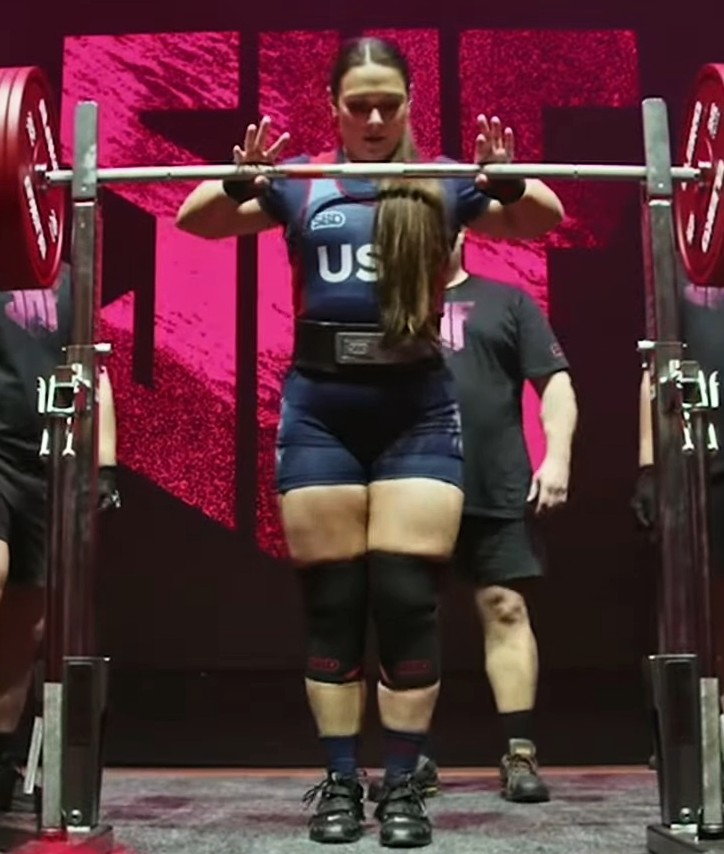

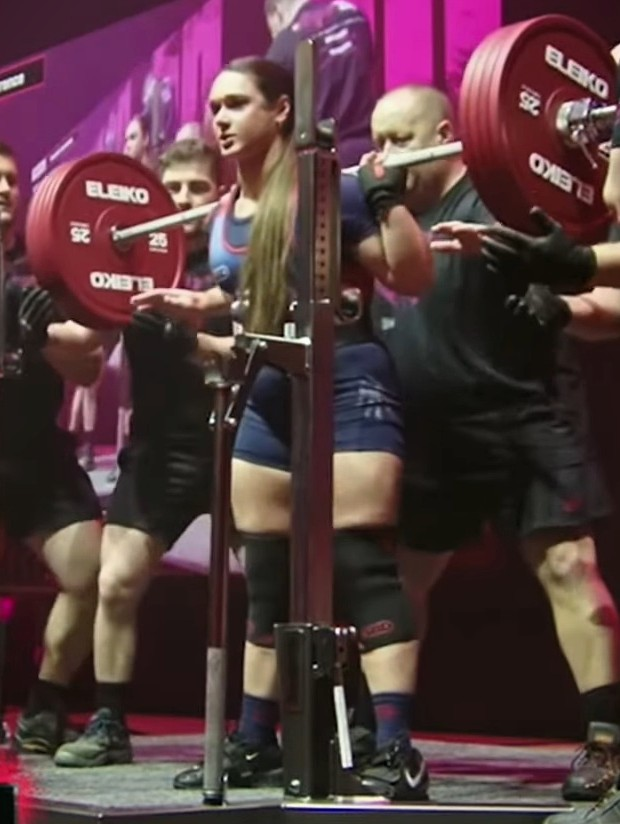

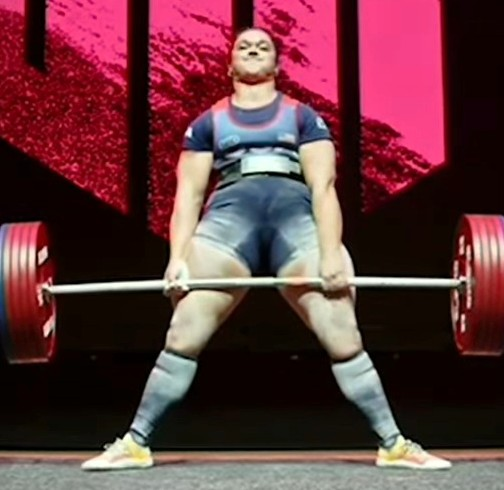
