= Jessica Buettner =

Canadian powerlifter

Medal record

Women's powerlifting

Representing Canada

World Championships
Silver medal – second place	2019 Helsingborg	72 kg

Jessica Buettner (born 1995 is a Canadian powerlifter, who won the gold medal in the 2022 IPF 76 kg open powerlifting classic and who won the silver medal in the 72 kg - Raw class at 2019 IPF World Championship in Helsingborg. She also broke three junior powerlifting records at 2018 World Championship, and she previously competed in shot put.
