= Vladislav Alhazov =

Russian and Israeli powerlifter (born 1978)

Personal information
- Nickname: Vlad
- Born: 14 November 1978 (age 47) Grozny, Russian SFSR
- Height: 6 ft 1.5 in (1.87 m)
- Weight: 150–180 kg (330–400 lb)

Sport
- Sport: Powerlifting

Vladislav "Vlad" Alhazov (born 14 November 1978) is an Israeli-Russian powerlifter, who holds the all-time world record for the heaviest raw squat (with wraps), at 525 kg (1,157 lb).

He is also the first man to squat 500 kg (1,102 lb) raw, in 2017 NPA Open Israel Championships, and is also the joint-world record holder along with Dan Bell for the heaviest raw squat within a full powerlifting competition, at 505 kg (1,113 lb). He was the first to do it in 2018 during ProRaw Powerlifting exhibition at Arnold Sports Festival in Australia.

Before breaking the raw world records, Alhazov was an equipped lifter and had squatted 567 kg (1,250 lb) in multi-ply equipment, but during an attempt at 590 kg (1,301 lb) at Westside Barbell in 2008, he suffered a severe injury when his left knee caved inwards, requiring complete knee reconstruction.

From 2006 to 2007, he also participated in several strongman competitions and emerged third at the 2006 IFSA Ukrainian Open. In 2017 Eisenhart Black Deadlift Championships held in Bavaria, Germany, Alhazov deadlifted 442.5 kg (976 lb) in 'strongman raw' standards.

== Personal Records ==
=== Powerlifting ===
Raw

- Squat – 525 kg (1,157 lb) with wraps (2018 WRPF Adrenaline Grand Prix, Belarus) (World Record)
- Bench press – 222.5 kg (491 lb) (2017 NPA Fitness Land Open Cup, Israel)
- Deadlift – 400 kg (882 lb) (2016 WRPF Night Strength, Russia)
- Total – 1,115 kg (2,458 lb) (500 + 220 + 395 kg (1,102 + 485 + 871 lb)) (2017 NPA Open Israel Championship, Israel)

Equipped (Multi-ply)

- Squat – 567.0 kg (1,250 lb) with wraps (2008 IPA Columbus Pro-Am, USA)
- Bench press – 285.7 kg (630 lb) (2008 IPA Columbus Pro-Am, USA)
- Deadlift – 419.5 kg (925 lb) (2008 IPA Columbus Pro-Am, USA)
- Total – 1,272.3 kg (2,805 lb) (2008 IPA Columbus Pro-Am, USA)

=== Strongman ===
- Deadlift – 442.5 kg (976 lb) raw with wrist straps (2017 Eisenhart Black Deadlift Championships, Germany)
- Platform squat (13cm ROM) – 660 kg (1,455 lb) (2006 Iceland's Strongest Man, Iceland)

== See also ==
- Progression of the squat world record
