= John Haack =

American powerlifter

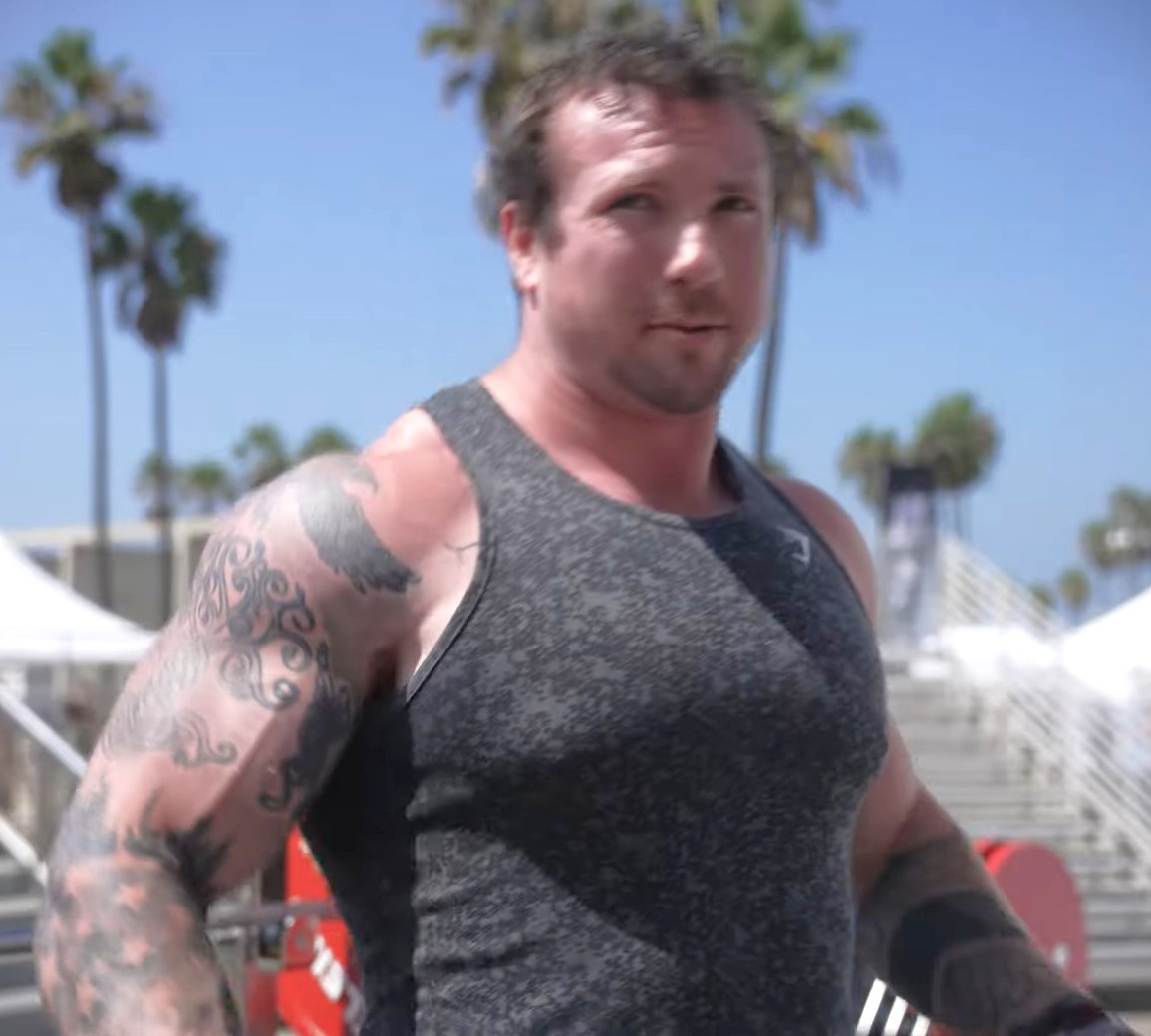
- Haack in 2022
- Born: John Haack; February 1, 1993 (age 33)
- Other names: Bilbo Swaggins; Captain America
- Occupations: powerlifter, chemist
- Known for: Powerlifting
- Height: 5 ft 9 in (1.75 m)

John Haack is an American powerlifter. Haack is often considered one of the greatest pound-for-pound powerlifters of all time as well as one of the greatest powerlifters of the modern age.

Being a world record-holder in multiple weight classes, he is the current world record holder in raw powerlifting in the 90 and 100 kilogram weight classes.

== Career ==
=== Powerlifting ===
Haack broke the IPF junior and open squat world record with 298 kilograms and a total world record with 813 kilograms in 2016, at age 23. He would secure first place at the competition, defeating Brett Gibbs in the 83 kilogram weight class. This IPF world record has since been surpassed by Brett Gibbs at the 2018 IPF world classic championships with a total of 830.5 kg.

In 2019, Haack set the previous 82.5 kg world record of 907.5 kg at the Tribute powerlifting meet in San Antonio, Texas. For this total, he squatted 312.5 kg, bench pressed 232.5 kg, and deadlifted 362.5 kg. This total beat his own previous record of 890 kg.

Haack is also the world record holder in the raw (without knee wraps) 90 kilogram weight class. In 2020, he broke the previous record for his first time, with a total of 932.5 kg (327.5 kg squat, 237.5 kg bench press, 367.5 kg deadlift), beating the previous record of 922.5 kg set by Jesse Norris in 2015. In 2021, Haack set a record in the 90 kilogram weight class, managing a total of 1,005.5 kg (340 kg squat, 263 kg bench press, 402.5 kg deadlift). This record set by Haack surpassed the 100 kilogram weight class (972.5 kg by Yury Belkin), and the 110 kilogram weight class (1,000 kg by Jamal Browner) total records.

On September 25, 2021, Haack totaled 1,005.5 kilograms (2,217 lb) for a new world record. On September 24, 2022, Haack became the first man in the 100 kilogram weight class to successfully eclipse a 600 pound bench press in competition, benching 272.5 kilograms (601 lb).

In 2022, at the WRPF American Pro, Haack set a new record in the raw 90 kilogram weight class. He totaled 1,022.5 kilograms (2,254.2 pounds). For this total, he squatted 345 kg (760.6 lb), bench pressed 267.5 kg (589.7 lb), and deadlifted 410 kg (903.9 lb).

Haack held the all-time highest DOTS score (a single-number rating that allows for comparison between weight classes) among male lifters in raw powerlifting with a score of 665.75, achieved on September 28, 2024 at the Power Surge Pro/Am VIII until Colton Engelbrecht achieved a score of 688.33 on March 29, 2025.

=== Personal records ===
100 kg weight class, raw

- Squat (w/sleeves) –838 lb (380 kg) (2026 American Pro)
- Bench press – 600.7 lb (272.5 kg) (2022 USPA Pro Raw Championships)
- Deadlift – 939.1 lb (426.0 kg) (2024 WRPF Ghost Clash 3) (world record)
- Total – 2,300.5 lb (1,043.5 kg) (804.7 + 556.6 + 939.1 lb (365.0 + 252.5 + 426.0 kg)) (2024 WRPF Ghost Clash 3) (world record)

90 kg weight class, raw

- Squat (w/sleeves) – 805.8 lb (365.5 kg) (2024 PLU Power Surge Pro/Am VIII) (world record)
- Bench press – 589.7 lb (267.5 kg) (2022 WRPF American Pro)
- Deadlift – 910.4 lb (413.0 kg) (2025 Power Surge Pro) (world record)
- Total – 2,254.2 lb (1,022.5 kg) (760.6 + 589.7 + 903.9 lb (345.0 + 267.5 + 410.0 kg)) (2022 WRPF American Pro) (world record)

82.5 kg weight class, raw

- Squat (w/sleeves) – 688.9 lb (312.5 kg) (2019 USPA Tribute)
- Bench press – 512.5 lb (232.5 kg) (2019 USPA Tribute)
- Deadlift – 799.1 lb (362.5 kg) (2019 USPA Tribute)
- Total – 2,000.7 lb (907.5 kg) (688.9 + 512.5 + 799.1 lb (312.5 + 232.5 + 362.5 kg)) (2019 USPA Tribute) (world record)

== Strongman ==
Haack made his strongman debut on July 23, 2023. He finished third at the 2023 armature U90KG Kaos Classic competition in Lytham St. Annes, England.

Haack competed again at the 2024 Official Strongman Games in the U90kg division where he placed sixth, taking the win in the axle deadlift and sandbag medley events. A few weeks after the competition, Haack revealed that he tore his labrum in the lead-up to the event, hampering his preparation and performance.

== See also ==
- List of powerlifters
