= List of Swedish records in Olympic weightlifting =

The following are the national records in Olympic weightlifting in Sweden. Records are maintained in each weight class for the snatch lift, clean and jerk lift, and the total for both lifts by the Swedish Weightlifting Federation (Svenska Tyngdlyftningsförbundet).

== Current records ==
=== Men ===
Event	Record	Athlete	Date	Meet	Place	Ref
60 kg
Snatch	90 kg	Carl Lodin	26 September 2026		Sundbyberg, Sweden	
Clean & Jerk	105 kg	Carl Lodin	26 September 2026		Sundbyberg, Sweden	
Total	195 kg	Carl Lodin	26 September 2026		Sundbyberg, Sweden	
65 kg
Snatch	87 kg	Casey Claasen	18 September 2026	World Masters Championships	Athens, Greece	
Clean & Jerk	110 kg	Carl Lodin	29 August 2026		Sandviken, Sweden	
Total	195 kg	Carl Lodin	29 August 2026		Sandviken, Sweden	
70 kg
Snatch	123 kg	Eddie Berglund	8 August 2026		Sandviken, Sweden	
Clean & Jerk	138 kg	Eddie Berglund	26 September 2026		Sandviken, Sweden	
Total	260 kg	Eddie Berglund	8 August 2026		Sandviken, Sweden	
75 kg
Snatch	105 kg	Sigge Malmberg	26 September 2026		Sandviken, Sweden	
Clean & Jerk	131 kg	Nikita Petrov	17 October 2026		Sandviken, Sweden	
Total	231 kg	Sigge Malmberg	26 September 2026		Sandviken, Sweden	
85 kg
Snatch	120 kg	Kim Carlsson	26 September 2026		Gothenburg, Sweden	
Clean & Jerk	150 kg	Victor Ahlm	26 September 2026		Helsingborg, Sweden	
Total	270 kg	Kim Carlsson	26 September 2026		Gothenburg, Sweden	
95 kg
Snatch	132 kg	Simon Liedholm	18 October 2026	European U23 Championships	Durrës, Albania	
Clean & Jerk	170 kg	Simon Liedholm	18 October 2026	European U23 Championships	Durrës, Albania	
Total	302 kg	Simon Liedholm	18 October 2026	European U23 Championships	Durrës, Albania	
110 kg
Snatch	176 kg	Joen Vikingsson Sjöblom	6 November 2026	World Championships	Ningbo, China	
Clean & Jerk	214 kg	Joen Vikingsson Sjöblom	6 November 2026	World Championships	Ningbo, China	
Total	390 kg	Joen Vikingsson Sjöblom	6 November 2026	World Championships	Ningbo, China	
+110 kg
Snatch	170 kg	Joen Vikingsson Sjöblom	26 September 2026		Gothenburg, Sweden	
Clean & Jerk	211 kg	Joen Vikingsson Sjöblom	19 October 2026	European U23 Championships	Durrës, Albania	
Total	378 kg	Joen Vikingsson Sjöblom	19 October 2026	European U23 Championships	Durrës, Albania	

=== Women ===
Event	Record	Athlete	Date	Meet	Place	Ref
49 kg
Snatch	49 kg	Caroline Lagerborg	18 September 2026	World Masters Championships	Athens, Greece	
Clean & Jerk	63 kg	Caroline Lagerborg	18 September 2026	World Masters Championships	Athens, Greece	
Total	112 kg	Caroline Lagerborg	18 September 2026	World Masters Championships	Athens, Greece	
53 kg
Snatch	70 kg	Wilma Arvidsson	22 August 2026	European U15 Championships	Pristina, Kosovo	
Clean & Jerk	90 kg	Wilma Arvidsson	22 August 2026	European U15 Championships	Pristina, Kosovo	
Total	160 kg	Wilma Arvidsson	22 August 2026	European U15 Championships	Pristina, Kosovo	
57 kg
Snatch	76 kg	Donna Berglund	30 October 2026	World Championships	Ningbo, China	
Clean & Jerk	99 kg	Donna Berglund	30 October 2026	World Championships	Ningbo, China	
Total	175 kg	Donna Berglund	30 October 2026	World Championships	Ningbo, China	
61 kg
Snatch	80 kg	Donna Berglund	8 August 2026		Sandviken, Sweden	
Clean & Jerk	105 kg	Donna Berglund	8 August 2026		Sandviken, Sweden	
Total	185 kg	Donna Berglund	8 August 2026		Sandviken, Sweden	
69 kg
Snatch	87 kg	Maria Hesketh	26 September 2026		Stockholm, Sweden	
Clean & Jerk	111 kg	Tilde Muhrman	16 October 2026	European U23 Championships	Durrës, Albania	
Total	197 kg	Tilde Muhrman	16 October 2026	European U23 Championships	Durrës, Albania	
77 kg
Snatch	95 kg	Jennifer Andersson	26 September 2026		Gothenburg, Sweden	
Clean & Jerk	110 kg	Jennifer Andersson	26 September 2026		Gothenburg, Sweden	
Total	205 kg	Jennifer Andersson	26 September 2026		Gothenburg, Sweden	
86 kg
Snatch	86 kg	Fanny Köhler	18 October 2026	European Junior Championships	Durrës, Albania	
Clean & Jerk	110 kg	Mikaela Persson Silfverbrand	8 August 2026		Sandviken, Sweden	
Total	190 kg	Mikaela Persson Silfverbrand	8 August 2026		Sandviken, Sweden	
+86 kg
Snatch	84 kg	Ellen Eriksson	27 September 2026		Gothenburg, Sweden	
Clean & Jerk	105 kg	Elsa Eichholzer	26 September 2026		Helsingborg, Sweden	
Total	185 kg	Elsa Eichholzer	26 September 2026		Helsingborg, Sweden	

== Historical records ==
=== Men (2025–2026) ===
Event	Record	Athlete	Date	Meet	Place	Ref
60 kg
Snatch	94 kg	Carl Lodin	29 May 2026	Swedish Championships	Kalmar, Sweden	
Clean & Jerk	114 kg	Carl Lodin	29 May 2026	Swedish Championships	Kalmar, Sweden	
Total	208 kg	Carl Lodin	29 May 2026	Swedish Championships	Kalmar, Sweden	
65 kg
Snatch	113 kg	Andy Toha	6 June 2025	Swedish Championships	Trelleborg, Sweden	
Clean & Jerk	140 kg	Andy Toha	6 June 2025	Swedish Championships	Trelleborg, Sweden	
Total	253 kg	Andy Toha	6 June 2025	Swedish Championships	Trelleborg, Sweden	
71 kg
Snatch	132 kg	Eddie Berglund	16 August 2025		Sandviken, Sweden	
Clean & Jerk	161 kg	Eddie Berglund	15 November 2025	Nordic Championships	Garðabær, Iceland	
Total	292 kg	Eddie Berglund	15 November 2025	Nordic Championships	Garðabær, Iceland	
79 kg
Snatch	127 kg	Eddie Berglund	24 January 2026	Copenhagen Weightlifting Cup	Copenhagen, Denmark	
Clean & Jerk	158 kg	Victor Ahlm	6 June 2025	Swedish Championships	Trelleborg, Sweden	
Total	281 kg	Victor Ahlm	6 June 2025	Swedish Championships	Trelleborg, Sweden	
88 kg
Snatch	135 kg	David Börjesson	30 May 2026	Swedish Championships	Kalmar, Sweden	
Clean & Jerk	170 kg	David Börjesson	30 May 2026	Swedish Championships	Kalmar, Sweden	
Total	305 kg	David Börjesson	30 May 2026	Swedish Championships	Kalmar, Sweden	
94 kg
Snatch	141 kg	Christopher Vilagi	15 November 2025	Nordic Championships	Garðabær, Iceland	
Clean & Jerk	166 kg	Christopher Vilagi	30 May 2026	Swedish Championships	Kalmar, Sweden	
Total	305 kg	Christopher Vilagi	15 November 2025	Nordic Championships	Garðabær, Iceland	
110 kg
Snatch	160 kg	Hugo Ottosson	15 November 2025	Nordic Championships	Garðabær, Iceland	
Clean & Jerk	200 kg	Victor Sundh	1 November 2025	European U23 Championships	Durrës, Albania	
Total	355 kg	Hugo Ottosson	15 November 2025	Nordic Championships	Garðabær, Iceland	
+110 kg
Snatch	175 kg	Joen Vikingsson Sjöblom	31 May 2026	Swedish Championships	Kalmar, Sweden	
Clean & Jerk	210 kg	Joen Vikingsson Sjöblom	31 May 2026	Swedish Championships	Kalmar, Sweden	
Total	385 kg	Joen Vikingsson Sjöblom	31 May 2026	Swedish Championships	Kalmar, Sweden	

=== Men (2018–2025) ===
Event	Record	Athlete	Date	Meet	Place	Ref
55 kg
Snatch	95 kg	Carl Lodin	26 March 2022		Vallentuna, Sweden	
Clean & Jerk	112 kg	Carl Lodin	8 October 2022		Rovaniemi, Finland	
Total	205 kg	Carl Lodin	26 March 2022		Vallentuna, Sweden	
61 kg
Snatch	105 kg	Andy Toha	4 February 2023		Helsingborg, Sweden	
Clean & Jerk	126 kg	Andy Toha	27 July 2023	European Junior Championships	Bucharest, Romania	
Total	224 kg	Andy Toha	27 July 2023	European Junior Championships	Bucharest, Romania	
67 kg
Snatch	111 kg	Eddie Berglund	30 June 2019		Malmö, Sweden	
Clean & Jerk	127 kg	Andy Toha	16 June 2023		Visby, Sweden	
Total	236 kg	Eddie Berglund	30 June 2019		Malmö, Sweden	
73 kg
Snatch	120 kg	Eddie Berglund	18 October 2020		Eskilstuna, Sweden	
Clean & Jerk	150 kg	Victor Ahlm	23 October 2019	European U23 Championships	Bucharest, Romania	
Total	265 kg	Victor Ahlm	23 October 2019	European U23 Championships	Bucharest, Romania	
81 kg
Snatch	140 kg	David Börjesson	26 March 2022		Gothenburg, Sweden	
Clean & Jerk	171 kg	David Börjesson	18 June 2022		Landskrona, Sweden	
Total	306 kg	David Börjesson	18 June 2022		Landskrona, Sweden	
89 kg
Snatch	140 kg	Joen Vikingsson Sjöblom	8 October 2021		Halmstad, Sweden	
Clean & Jerk	171 kg	David Börjesson	11 September 2021		Gothenburg, Sweden	
Total	310 kg	Joen Vikingsson Sjöblom	8 October 2021		Halmstad, Sweden	
96 kg
Snatch	151 kg	Joen Vikingsson Sjöblom	19 June 2022		Landskrona, Sweden	
Clean & Jerk	181 kg	Joen Vikingsson Sjöblom	8 May 2022	Junior World Championships	Heraklion, Greece	
Total	331 kg	Joen Vikingsson Sjöblom	22 October 2022	European Junior Championships	Durrës, Albania	
102 kg
Snatch	158 kg	Joen Vikingsson Sjöblom	1 August 2023	European Junior Championships	Bucharest, Romania	
Clean & Jerk	195 kg	Victor Sundh	10 May 2025		Stockholm, Sweden	
Total	347 kg	Stefan Ågren	17 June 2023		Visby, Sweden	
109 kg
Snatch	162 kg	Stefan Ågren	10 October 2021	Swedish Championships	Halmstad, Sweden	
Clean & Jerk	203 kg	Stefan Ågren	10 October 2021	Swedish Championships	Halmstad, Sweden	
Total	365 kg	Stefan Ågren	10 October 2021	Swedish Championships	Halmstad, Sweden	
+109 kg
Snatch	160 kg	Erik Martin	29 August 2020		Gävle, Sweden	
Clean & Jerk	206 kg	Hampus Lithén	24 July 2021		Helsingborg, Sweden	
Total	358 kg	Hampus Lithén	14 December 2019		Vallentuna, Sweden	

=== Men (1998–2018) ===
Event	Record	Athlete	Date	Meet	Place	Ref
–56 kg
Snatch	97 kg	Per Söderlind	20 May 2000		Sacramento, United States	
Clean & Jerk	122 kg	Per Söderlind	20 May 2000		Sacramento, United States	
Total	220 kg	Per Söderlind	20 May 2000		Sacramento, United States	
–62 kg
Snatch	110 kg	Eddie Berglund	30 June 2017	Swedish Championships	Borås, Sweden	
Clean & Jerk	129 kg	Eddie Berglund	30 June 2017	Swedish Championships	Borås, Sweden	
Total	239 kg	Eddie Berglund	30 June 2017	Swedish Championships	Borås, Sweden	
–69 kg
Snatch	125 kg	Björn Larsson	27 February 1999		Falköping, Sweden	
Clean & Jerk	157 kg	Björn Larsson	27 February 1999		Falköping, Sweden	
Total	282 kg	Björn Larsson	27 February 1999		Falköping, Sweden	
–77 kg
Snatch	142 kg	Mats Lindqvist	17 January 1999		Copenhagen, Denmark	
Clean & Jerk	170 kg	André Aldenhov	5 April 1998		Bergsjö, Sweden	
Total	310 kg	André Aldenhov	5 April 1998		Bergsjö, Sweden	
–85 kg
Snatch	140 kg	Christian Kraft	10 December 2000		Stockholm, Sweden	
Clean & Jerk	165 kg	Daniel Larsson	5 April 1998		Bergsjö, Sweden	
Total	300 kg	Daniel Larsson	5 April 1998		Bergsjö, Sweden	
–94 kg
Snatch	152 kg	Jim Gyllenhammar	25 February 2001		Stockholm, Sweden	
Clean & Jerk	190 kg	Jim Gyllenhammar	25 February 2001		Stockholm, Sweden	
Total	342 kg	Jim Gyllenhammar	25 February 2001		Stockholm, Sweden	
–105 kg
Snatch	165 kg	Lars Andersson	9 April 2005		Falun, Sweden	
Clean & Jerk	200 kg	Lars Andersson	9 April 2005		Falun, Sweden	
Total	365 kg	Lars Andersson	9 April 2005		Falun, Sweden	
+105 kg
Snatch	177 kg	Jim Gyllenhammar	17 May 2009		Visby, Sweden	
Clean & Jerk	226 kg	Jim Gyllenhammar	17 May 2009		Visby, Sweden	
Total	403 kg	Jim Gyllenhammar	17 May 2009		Visby, Sweden	

=== Women (2025–2026) ===
Event	Record	Athlete	Date	Meet	Place	Ref
48 kg
Snatch	68 kg	Surya Sundqvist	15 November 2025	Nordic Championships	Garðabær, Iceland	
Clean & Jerk	80 kg	Anna Yang	6 June 2025	Swedish Championships	Trelleborg, Sweden	
Total	147 kg	Surya Sundqvist	15 November 2025	Nordic Championships	Garðabær, Iceland	
53 kg
Snatch	72 kg	Olivia Bjurling	24 January 2026	Copenhagen Weightlifting Cup	Copenhagen, Denmark	
Clean & Jerk	92 kg	Wilma Arvidsson	27 June 2026	Winslow Challenge	Vinslöv, Sweden	
Total	162 kg	Olivia Bjurling	29 May 2026	Swedish Championships	Kalmar, Sweden	
58 kg
Snatch	84 kg	Moa Henriksson	6 June 2025	Swedish Championships	Trelleborg, Sweden	
Clean & Jerk	109 kg	Donna Berglund	29 May 2026	Swedish Championships	Kalmar, Sweden	
Total	190 kg	Donna Berglund	29 May 2026	Swedish Championships	Kalmar, Sweden	
63 kg
Snatch	88 kg	Susanne Johansson	6 June 2025	Swedish Championships	Trelleborg, Sweden	
Clean & Jerk	105 kg	Susanne Johansson	15 November 2025	Nordic Championships	Garðabær, Iceland	
Total	188 kg	Susanne Johansson	6 June 2025	Swedish Championships	Trelleborg, Sweden	
69 kg
Snatch	95 kg	Jennifer Andersson	7 October 2025	World Championships	Førde, Norway	
Clean & Jerk	115 kg	Jennifer Andersson	7 October 2025	World Championships	Førde, Norway	
Total	210 kg	Jennifer Andersson	7 October 2025	World Championships	Førde, Norway	
77 kg
Snatch	94 kg	Jennifer Andersson	6 June 2025	Swedish Championships	Trelleborg, Sweden	
Clean & Jerk	118 kg	Jennifer Andersson	6 June 2025	Swedish Championships	Trelleborg, Sweden	
Total	212 kg	Jennifer Andersson	6 June 2025	Swedish Championships	Trelleborg, Sweden	
86 kg
Snatch	91 kg	Fanny Köhler	31 May 2026	Swedish Championships	Kalmar, Sweden	
Clean & Jerk	110 kg	Antonia Fält-Kottulinsky	31 May 2026	Swedish Championships	Kalmar, Sweden	
Total	198 kg	Antonia Fält-Kottulinsky	31 May 2026	Swedish Championships	Kalmar, Sweden	
+86 kg
Snatch	90 kg	Vanessa Kamga	31 January 2026		Sundbyberg, Sweden	
Clean & Jerk	115 kg	Vanessa Kamga	31 January 2026		Sundbyberg, Sweden	
Total	205 kg	Vanessa Kamga	31 January 2026		Sundbyberg, Sweden	

=== Women (2018–2025) ===
Event	Record	Athlete	Date	Meet	Place	Ref
45 kg
Snatch	55 kg	Nasrin Mosawi	4 February 2023		Gothenburg, Sweden	
Clean & Jerk	73 kg	Nasrin Mosawi	25 March 2023		Gothenburg, Sweden	
Total	128 kg	Nasrin Mosawi	25 March 2023		Gothenburg, Sweden	
49 kg
Snatch	72 kg	Surya Sundqvist	2 September 2023		Örebro, Sweden	
Clean & Jerk	83 kg	Surya Sundqvist	2 September 2023		Örebro, Sweden	
Total	155 kg	Surya Sundqvist	2 September 2023		Örebro, Sweden	
55 kg
Snatch	81 kg	Angelica Roos	7 April 2019	European Championships	Batumi, Georgia	
Clean & Jerk	103 kg	Angelica Roos	7 April 2019	European Championships	Batumi, Georgia	
Total	184 kg	Angelica Roos	7 April 2019	European Championships	Batumi, Georgia	
59 kg
Snatch	85 kg	Jenny Adolfsson	8 April 2019	European Championships	Batumi, Georgia	
Clean & Jerk	103 kg	Angelica Roos	3 February 2019		Gothenburg, Sweden	
Total	183 kg	Angelica Roos	3 February 2019		Gothenburg, Sweden	
64 kg
Snatch	103 kg	Daniela Gherman	23 October 2021		Vinslöv, Sweden	
Clean & Jerk	122 kg	Daniela Gherman	23 October 2021		Vinslöv, Sweden	
Total	225 kg	Daniela Gherman	23 October 2021		Vinslöv, Sweden	
71 kg
Snatch	104 kg	Patricia Strenius	13 December 2021	World Championships	Tashkent, Uzbekistan	
Clean & Jerk	133 kg	Patricia Strenius	9 February 2019	EGAT's Cup	Chiang Mai, Thailand	
Total	231 kg	Patricia Strenius	13 December 2021	World Championships	Tashkent, Uzbekistan	
76 kg
Snatch	105 kg	Patricia Strenius	13 October 2019	Nordic Championships	Vigrestad, Norway	
Clean & Jerk	136 kg	Patricia Strenius	18 October 2020		Stockholm, Sweden	
Total	238 kg	Patricia Strenius	13 October 2019	Nordic Championships	Vigrestad, Norway	
81 kg
Snatch	96 kg	Ida Rönn	3 September 2022		Vallentuna, Sweden	
Clean & Jerk	125 kg	Ida Rönn	21 April 2023	European Championships	Yerevan, Armenia	
Total	218 kg	Ida Rönn	21 April 2023	European Championships	Yerevan, Armenia	
87 kg
Snatch	96 kg	Paula Junhov Rindberg	12 October 2019	Nordic Championships	Vigrestad, Norway	
Clean & Jerk	123 kg	Ida Rönn	17 August 2024		Sandviken, Sweden	
Total	212 kg	Paula Junhov Rindberg	12 October 2019	Nordic Championships	Vigrestad, Norway	
+87 kg
Snatch	93 kg	Paula Junhov Rindberg	1 December 2018		Stockholm, Sweden	
Clean & Jerk	110 kg	Paula Junhov Rindberg	17 November 2018		Stockholm, Sweden	
Total	201 kg	Paula Junhov Rindberg	1 December 2018		Stockholm, Sweden	

=== Women (1998–2018) ===
Event	Record	Athlete	Date	Meet	Place	Ref
–48 kg
Snatch	71 kg	Surya Sundqvist	27 March 2018	European Championships	Bucharest, Romania	
Clean & Jerk	82 kg	Surya Sundqvist	1 September 2018	Finland–Sweden Match	Tampere, Finland	
Total	152 kg	Surya Sundqvist	27 March 2018	European Championships	Bucharest, Romania	
–53 kg
Snatch	74 kg	Lena Berntsson	2 July 2013		Halmstad, Sweden	
Clean & Jerk	93 kg	Lena Berntsson	19 February 2011		Bergen, Norway	
Total	162 kg	Lena Berntsson	2 July 2013		Halmstad, Sweden	
–58 kg
Snatch	88 kg	Angelica Roos	3 April 2017	European Championships	Split, Croatia	
Clean & Jerk	116 kg	Angelica Roos	29 June 2015	Swedish Championships	Sundsvall, Sweden	
Total	201 kg	Angelica Roos	3 April 2017	European Championships	Split, Croatia	
–63 kg
Snatch	92 kg	Angelica Roos	20 May 2017		Falköping, Sweden	
Clean & Jerk	118 kg	Patricia Strenius	25 November 2015	World Championships	Houston, United States	
Total	207 kg	Angelica Roos	1 July 2017	Swedish Championships	Borås, Sweden	
–69 kg
Snatch	101 kg	Patricia Strenius	1 July 2017	Swedish Championships	Borås, Sweden	
Clean & Jerk	131 kg	Patricia Strenius	30 March 2018	European Championships	Bucharest, Romania	
Total	230 kg	Patricia Strenius	30 March 2018	European Championships	Bucharest, Romania	
–75 kg
Snatch	104 kg	Patricia Strenius	10 February 2018		Stockholm, Sweden	
Clean & Jerk	128 kg	Patricia Strenius	10 February 2018		Stockholm, Sweden	
Total	232 kg	Patricia Strenius	10 February 2018		Stockholm, Sweden	
–90 kg
Snatch	89 kg	Paula Junhov Rindberg	1 September 2018	Finland–Sweden Match	Tampere, Finland	
Clean & Jerk	110 kg	Paula Junhov Rindberg	1 September 2018	Finland–Sweden Match	Tampere, Finland	
Total	199 kg	Paula Junhov Rindberg	1 September 2018	Finland–Sweden Match	Tampere, Finland	
+90 kg
Snatch	91 kg	Paula Junhov Rindberg	4 July 2018	Swedish Championships	Helsingborg, Sweden	
Clean & Jerk	111 kg	Paula Junhov Rindberg	10 February 2018		Vallentuna, Sweden	
Total	201 kg	Paula Junhov Rindberg	10 February 2018		Vallentuna, Sweden	
