= List of European Championships medalists in powerlifting (men) =

This is a list of european championships medalists in men's powerlifting.

The various federations of powerlifting have their own championships. The European Powerlifting Federation's (EPF) recognition by the International Olympic Committee as the official governing body, as well its longevity has resulted in their championships being deemed the official european championships, and the results of these are shown below.

== Current categories - Classic ==
=== -59 kg ===
Meet	Gold	Silver	Bronze
2015 Plzeň	(Poland) Dariusz Wszoła	(France) Etienne Lited	(Russia) Konstantin Makarov
2016 Tartu	(Russia) Alexander Kolbin	(Poland) Dariusz Wszoła	(Poland) Sławomir Śledź
2017 Thisted	(Poland) Dariusz Wszoła	(Russia) Evgeniy Mukhomedyanov	(Poland) Sławomir Śledź
2018 Kaunas	(Poland) Dariusz Wszoła	(Russia) Evgeniy Mukhomedyanov	(Russia) Ilshat Makhmurov
2019 Kaunas	(Poland) Dariusz Wszoła	(Poland) Sławomir Śledź	(Russia) Ilshat Makhmurov
2020 Warsaw	Cancelled due to the COVID-19 pandemic		
2021 Vasteras	(Russia) Evgeniy Mukhomedyanov	(Bulgaria) Aleksander Petrov	(France) Antoine Garcia
2022 Skierniewice	(France) Antoine Garcia	(Poland) Dariusz Wszoła	(France) Julien Gutierrez
2023 Tartu	(United Kingdom) Ishtyaq Nabi	(France) Antoine Garcia	(Poland) Dariusz Wszoła
2024 Velika Gorica	(Spain) Iván Campano Díaz	(France) Julien Gutierrez	(Poland) Dariusz Wszoła

=== -66 kg ===
Meet	Gold	Silver	Bronze
2015 Plzeň	(Finland) Antti Savolainen	(Russia) Andrey Kostenko	(Poland) Mariusz Grotkowski
2016 Tartu	(Finland) Antti Savolainen	(France) Thomas Louet	(Belarus) Ryhor Tsiareshchanka
2017 Thisted	(Finland) Antti Savolainen	(Russia) Sergey Skochek	(Lithuania) Šarūnas Tolvaiša
2018 Kaunas	(Sweden) Eddie Berglund	(France) Panagiotis Tarinidis	(Russia) Alexander Kolbin
2019 Kaunas	(Sweden) Eddie Berglund	(Russia) Alexander Kolbin	(Poland) Mariusz Grotkowski
2020 Warsaw	Cancelled due to the COVID-19 pandemic		
2021 Vasteras	(France) Panagiotis Tarinidis	(Sweden) Eddie Berglund	(Russia) Ilia Marichev
2022 Skierniewice	(Spain) Alvaro Fernández Arcas	(France) Valentin Fruchard	(Austria) Joel Christopher Catena
2023 Tartu	(France) Panagiotis Tarinidis	(Austria) Joel Christopher Catena	(Finland) Antti Savolainen
2024 Velika Gorica	(Italy) Federico Murru	(France) Valentin Fruchard	(Spain) Alvaro Fernández Arcas

=== -74 kg ===
Meet	Gold	Silver	Bronze
2015 Plzeň	(Belarus) Aliaksandr Hrynkevich-Sudnik	(France) Hassan El Belghiti	(Finland) Sami Nieminen
2016 Tartu	(Finland) Sami Nieminen	(Ukraine) Anton Karachentsev	(France) Adrien Poinson
2017 Thisted	(Belarus) Aliaksandr Hrynkevich-Sudnik	(Ukraine) Oleksandr Makhov	(Russia) Alexey Bakhirev
2018 Kaunas	(Norway) Kjell Egil Bakkelund	(Sweden) Alexander Eriksson	(Russia) Sergey Negara
2019 Kaunas	(Sweden) Alexander Eriksson	(Belarus) Aliaksandr Hrynkevich-Sudnik	(Russia) Anatolii Goriachok
2020 Warsaw	Cancelled due to the COVID-19 pandemic		
2021 Vasteras	(Sweden) Alexander Eriksson	(France) Paul Rembauville	(Germany) Joshua Wright
2022 Skierniewice	(Sweden) Eddie Berglund	(France) Paul Rembauville	(Sweden) Alexander Eriksson
2023 Tartu	(Norway) Kjell Egil Bakkelund	(Ukraine) Dmytro Biliak	(Italy) Dennis Fastelli
2024 Velika Gorica	(Germany) Joshua Wright	(Sweden) Eddie Berglund	(Sweden) Alexander Eriksson

=== -83 kg ===
Meet	Gold	Silver	Bronze
2015 Plzeň	(Russia) Konstantin Dyashkin	(Finland) Mikko Ronkainen	(Poland) Łukasz Matwin
2016 Tartu	(Russia) Alexey Kuzmin	(United Kingdom) Owen Hubbard	(Poland) Jacek Spychała
2017 Thisted	(Slovenia) Jure Rus	(Poland) Jacek Spychała	(Russia) Konstantin Dyashkin
2018 Kaunas	(United Kingdom) Owen Hubbard	(Russia) Alexey Kuzmin	(Sweden) Erik Karlsson
2019 Kaunas	(United Kingdom) Owen Hubbard	(Sweden) Erik Karlsson	(Italy) Emilio Cotti Cometti
2020 Warsaw	Cancelled due to the COVID-19 pandemic		
2021 Vasteras	(France) Yanis Bouchou	(Italy) Emilio Cotti Cometti	(United Kingdom) Jurins Kengamu
2022 Skierniewice	(United Kingdom) Jurins Kengamu	(Republic of Ireland) Damian Nam	(Hungary) Asein Enahoro
2023 Tartu	(Hungary) Asein Enahoro	(United Kingdom) Jurins Kengamu	(Italy) Edoardo Mazzucchielli
2024 Velika Gorica	(United Kingdom) Jurins Kengamu	(France) Paul Rembauville	(Hungary) Asein Enahoro

=== -93 kg ===
Meet	Gold	Silver	Bronze
2015 Plzeň	(Bulgaria) Borislav Adov	(Russia) Sergey Lupin	(Russia) Sergei Bakhtin
2016 Tartu	(Bulgaria) Borislav Adov	(Czech Republic) Jakub Sedláček	(France) Ali Ben Hadj Ali
2017 Thisted	(Czech Republic) Jakub Sedláček	(Russia) Sergey Lupin	(Sweden) Emil Johansson
2018 Kaunas	(Ukraine) Anatolii Novopismennyi	(Bulgaria) Borislav Adov	(Bulgaria) Vladislav Gerginov
2019 Kaunas	(Ukraine) Anatolii Novopismennyi	(Sweden) Gustav Hedlund	(United Kingdom) Ashley Liston
2020 Warsaw	Cancelled due to the COVID-19 pandemic		
2021 Vasteras	(Sweden) Gustav Hedlund	(United Kingdom) William Pickering	(Bulgaria) Teodor Radev
2022 Skierniewice	(Germany) Sascha Stendebach	(United Kingdom) Christian Ayandokun	(Sweden) Gustav Hedlund
2023 Tartu	(United Kingdom) Christian Ayandokun	(Italy) Andrea Cicero	(Spain) Marc Rius i Pecanins
2024 Velika Gorica	(Norway) Trygve Sletten	(United Kingdom) Christian Ayandokun	(United Kingdom) Nathan Gevao

=== -105 kg ===
Meet	Gold	Silver	Bronze
2015 Plzeň	(Russia) Andrey Inin	(Russia) Ernst Gross	(Finland) Teemu Mutikainen
2016 Tartu	(Estonia) Alex-Edward Raus	(Poland) Marcin Goleń	(Poland) Mateusz Grzesik
2017 Thisted	(Poland) Krzysztof Wierzbicki	(France) Ali Ben Hadj Ali	(Sweden) Mikael Gullander
2018 Kaunas	(Poland) Krzysztof Wierzbicki	(Russia) Ernst Gross	(Republic of Ireland) Barry Pigott
2019 Kaunas	(Sweden) Emil Norling	(Russia) Vladislav Aksennikov	(United Kingdom) Sam Watt
2020 Warsaw	Cancelled due to the COVID-19 pandemic		
2021 Vasteras	(Sweden) Emil Norling	(Ukraine) Anatolii Novopismennyi	(Finland) Tuomas Hautala
2022 Skierniewice	(Sweden) Emil Norling	(Ukraine) Anatolii Novopismennyi	(France) Corentin Clément
2023 Tartu	(Sweden) Emil Norling	(United Kingdom) Ben Pape	(Germany) Timo Jakobi
2024 Velika Gorica	(Sweden) Emil Norling	(United Kingdom) Ben Pape	(Republic of Ireland) Oluwadamilola Fashoranti

=== -120 kg ===
Meet	Gold	Silver	Bronze
2015 Plzeň	(Bulgaria) Ivaylo Hristov	(United Kingdom) Tony Cliffe	(Poland) Mateusz Grzesik
2016 Tartu	(Ukraine) Viktor Marynenko	(Latvia) Māris Juzups	(Czech Republic) Pavol Demčák
2017 Thisted	(United Kingdom) Tony Cliffe	(Poland) Piotr Sadowski	(Ukraine) Viktor Marynenko
2018 Kaunas	(Lithuania) Amandas Paulauskas	(Poland) Piotr Sadowski	(Poland) Mateusz Grzesik
2019 Kaunas	(Poland) Piotr Sadowski	(Ukraine) Dmytro Pavlenko	(Russia) Daniil Ermolaev
2020 Warsaw	Cancelled due to the COVID-19 pandemic		
2021 Vasteras	(United Kingdom) Kieran Gray	(Poland) Mateusz Grzesik	(Russia) Daniil Ermolaev
2022 Skierniewice	(United Kingdom) Kieran Gray	(France) Nicolas Peyraud	(Poland) Mateusz Grzesik
2023 Tartu	(United Kingdom) Inderraj Singh Dhillon	(Germany) Jonah Wiendieck	(Germany) Maximilian Heidenreich
2024 Velika Gorica	(United Kingdom) Tony Cliffe	(Spain) Víctor Vázquez H-Carrillo	(United Kingdom) Inderraj Singh Dhillon

=== 120+ kg ===
Meet	Gold	Silver	Bronze
2015 Plzeň	(Latvia) Mārtiņš Krūze	(Russia) Artem Kovalchuk	(Czech Republic) David Lupač
2016 Tartu	(Latvia) Mārtiņš Krūze	(Estonia) Siim Rast	(Norway) Martin Rønning
2017 Thisted	(Latvia) Mārtiņš Krūze	(Estonia) Siim Rast	(Netherlands) Christophe Rebreyend
2018 Kaunas	(Estonia) Siim Rast	(Czech Republic) David Lupač	(Spain) Rubén Rico Martín
2019 Kaunas	(Estonia) Siim Rast	(Spain) Rubén Rico Martín	(Slovakia) Róbert Valach
2020 Warsaw	Cancelled due to the COVID-19 pandemic		
2021 Vasteras	(Ukraine) Dmytro Vovk	(Russia) Maksim Prokhorov	(United Kingdom) Ajay Sharma
2022 Skierniewice	(Turkey) Cenk Koçak	(Spain) Rubén Rico Martín	(Ukraine) Dmytro Vovk
2023 Tartu	(Georgia (country)) Temur Samkharadze	(Turkey) Cenk Koçak	(France) Stanley Odin
2024 Velika Gorica	(Georgia (country)) Temur Samkharadze	(Spain) Rubén Rico Martín	(Belgium) Steve Ringoot

== Current categories - Equipped ==
=== -59 kg ===
Meet	Gold	Silver	Bronze
2011 Plzeň	(Poland) Dariusz Wszoła	(Russia) Sergey Levin	(France) Etienne Lited
2012 Mariupol	(Russia) Alexander Kolbin	(Ukraine) Sergii Antoniuk	(Poland) Dariusz Wszoła
2013 Plzeň	(Russia) Alexander Kolbin	(Poland) Paweł Ośmiałowski	(Ukraine) Sergii Antoniuk
2014 Sofia	(Poland) Paweł Ośmiałowski	(Poland) Jakub Synak	Only two classified athletes
2015 Chemnitz	(Russia) Alexander Kolbin	(Poland) Dariusz Wszoła	(Poland) Paweł Ośmiałowski
2016 Plzeň	(Poland) Dariusz Wszoła	(Poland) Paweł Ośmiałowski	(Romania) Radu Raica
2017 Malaga	(Russia) Kirill Krut	(Poland) Dariusz Wszoła	(Poland) Paweł Ośmiałowski
2018 Plzeň	(Russia) Kirill Krut	(Poland) Dariusz Wszoła	(Poland) Paweł Ośmiałowski
2019 Plzeň	(Russia) Kirill Krut	(Russia) Ilia Marichev	(Poland) Dariusz Wszoła
2020 Thisted	Cancelled due to the COVID-19 pandemic		
2021 Plzeň	(Poland) Paweł Ośmiałowski	(Poland) Dominik Golak	Only two classified athletes
2022 Plzeň	(Poland) Dariusz Wszoła	(Italy) Jacopo Santangelo	(Poland) Paweł Ośmiałowski
2023 Thisted	(Poland) Paweł Ośmiałowski	(Romania) Cristian Moise	Only two classified athletes

=== -66 kg ===
Meet	Gold	Silver	Bronze
2011 Plzeň	(France) Hassan El Belghiti	(Italy) Pierangelo Puddu	(Poland) Dominik Golak
2012 Mariupol	(Russia) Konstantin Danilov	(France) Hassan El Belghiti	(Ukraine) Anton Karachentsev
2013 Plzeň	(Russia) Alexander Molin	(Ukraine) Anton Karachentsev	(Finland) Antti Savolainen
2014 Sofia	(Russia) Sergey Gladkikh	(Finland) Antti Savolainen	(Russia) Alexander Kolbin
2015 Chemnitz	(Russia) Sergey Gladkikh	(Finland) Antti Savolainen	(Poland) Mariusz Grotkowski
2016 Plzeň	(Finland) Antti Savolainen	(Poland) Mariusz Grotkowski	(Ukraine) Suradzh Chebotar
2017 Malaga	(Russia) Konstantin Danilov	(Poland) Mariusz Grotkowski	(France) Hassan El Belghiti
2018 Plzeň	(France) Hassan El Belghiti	(Russia) Konstantin Danilov	(Italy) Andrea Zaino
2019 Plzeň	(Russia) Konstantin Danilov	(France) Hassan El Belghiti	(Poland) Mariusz Grotkowski
2020 Thisted	Cancelled due to the COVID-19 pandemic		
2021 Plzeň	(France) Hassan El Belghiti	(Poland) Mariusz Grotkowski	(Poland) Kamil Iwasiow
2022 Plzeň	(France) Hassan El Belghiti	(Finland) Antti Savolainen	(Romania) Gheorghe Moise
2023 Thisted	(France) Hassan El Belghiti	(Poland) Mariusz Grotkowski	(Romania) Gheorghe Moise

=== -74 kg ===
Meet	Gold	Silver	Bronze
2011 Plzeň	(Poland) Jarosław Olech	(Russia) Pavel Ozerov	(Bulgaria) Rostislav Petkov
2012 Mariupol	(Poland) Jarosław Olech	(Russia) Dmitry Makarov	(Ukraine) Anatolii Goriachok
2013 Plzeň	(Ukraine) Anatolii Goriachok	(France) Hassan El Belghiti	(Norway) Kim-Raino Rølvåg
2014 Sofia	(Poland) Jarosław Olech	(Ukraine) Anatolii Goriachok	(Ukraine) Mykola Barannik
2015 Chemnitz	(Russia) Sergei Gaishinetc	(Ukraine) Mykola Barannik	(Norway) Kim-Raino Rølvåg
2016 Plzeň	(Russia) Sergei Gaishinetc	(Ukraine) Mykola Barannik	(France) Hassan El Belghiti
2017 Malaga	(Russia) Sergei Gaishinetc	(Ukraine) Mykola Barannik	(Ukraine) Vitalii Kolomiiets
2018 Plzeň	(Russia) Konstantin Dunin	(France) Antoni Mastrolorenzo	(United Kingdom) Paul Campbell
2019 Plzeň	(Norway) Kjell Egil Bakkelund	(Sweden) Alexander Eriksson	(Ukraine) Vladislav Chornyi
2020 Thisted	Cancelled due to the COVID-19 pandemic		
2021 Plzeň	(Netherlands) Pardeep Kailey	(Czech Republic) Jan More	(Romania) Bogdan Pop
2022 Plzeň	(Norway) Kjell Egil Bakkelund	(Italy) Diego Milani	(Netherlands) Eray Cingi
2023 Thisted	(Finland) Antti Savolainen	(Ukraine) Andrii Stepanov	(United Kingdom) Bernard McGurk

=== -83 kg ===
Meet	Gold	Silver	Bronze
2011 Plzeň	(Russia) Evgenii Vasiukov	(Ukraine) Volodymyr Rysiev	(Ukraine) Andriy Naniev
2012 Mariupol	(United Kingdom) Robert Palmer	(Bulgaria) Todor Vasilev	(Germany) Eduard Tepper
2013 Plzeň	(Norway) Kjell Egil Bakkelund	(United Kingdom) Robert Palmer	(Russia) Pavel Ozerov
2014 Sofia	(Norway) Kjell Egil Bakkelund	(Russia) Alexey Sorokin	(Ukraine) Volodymyr Rysiev
2015 Chemnitz	(Russia) Alexey Sorokin	(Ukraine) Volodymyr Rysiev	(Sweden) Patrik Turesson
2016 Plzeň	(Ukraine) Volodymyr Rysiev	(Ukraine) Oleksandr Lebediev	(Italy) Simone Sanasi
2017 Malaga	(Russia) Alexey Sorokin	(Russia) Evgenii Vasiukov	(Norway) Kim-Raino Rølvåg
2018 Plzeň	(Russia) Evgenii Vasiukov	(Ukraine) Mykola Barannik	(Germany) Max Lochschmidt
2019 Plzeň	(Ukraine) Mykola Barannik	(Russia) Vladislav Shaibekov	(Norway) Kim-Raino Rølvåg
2020 Thisted	Cancelled due to the COVID-19 pandemic		
2021 Plzeň	(Ukraine) Vladislav Chornyi	(Ukraine) Andriy Naniev	(Germany) Max Lochschmidt
2022 Plzeň	(Ukraine) Vitalii Kolomiiets	(United Kingdom) Robert Palmer	(Ukraine) Andriy Naniev
2023 Thisted	(Norway) Kjell Egil Bakkelund	(Ukraine) Vitalii Kolomiiets	(Finland) Matias Viiperi

=== -93 kg ===
Meet	Gold	Silver	Bronze
2011 Plzeň	(Ukraine) Sergii Bilyi	(Russia) Sergey Mashintsov	(Sweden) Patrik Turesson
2012 Mariupol	(Russia) Sergey Mashintsov	(Estonia) Margus Silbaum	(Netherlands) Pjotr van den Hoek
2013 Plzeň	(Russia) Dmitry Inzarkin	(Sweden) Patrik Turesson	(Estonia) Margus Silbaum
2014 Sofia	(Russia) Evgeny Berdnikov	(Bulgaria) Todor Vasilev	(Germany) André Hentschel
2015 Chemnitz	(Ukraine) Sergii Bilyi	(Russia) Sergey Mashintsov	(Estonia) Margus Silbaum
2016 Plzeň	(Germany) Sascha Stendebach	(Ukraine) Anton Pravnik	(Norway) Julian Lysvand
2017 Malaga	(Estonia) Margus Silbaum	(Sweden) Henrik Fransson	(Austria) Alexander Huber
2018 Plzeň	(Ukraine) Volodymyr Rysiev	(Poland) Jan Wegiera	(Austria) Alexander Huber
2019 Plzeň	(Ukraine) Volodymyr Rysiev	(Ukraine) Kostiantyn Musiienko	(Sweden) Oliver Dahlkvist
2020 Thisted	Cancelled due to the COVID-19 pandemic		
2021 Plzeň	(Ukraine) Kostiantyn Musiienko	(Ukraine) Volodymyr Rysiev	(Denmark) Nicki Lentz
2022 Plzeň	(Ukraine) Kostiantyn Musiienko	(Denmark) Nicki Lentz	(Austria) Andreas Jandorek
2023 Thisted	(Ukraine) Kostiantyn Musiienko	(Austria) Andreas Jandorek	(Italy) Antonio Gorga

=== -105 kg ===
Meet	Gold	Silver	Bronze
2011 Plzeň	(Ukraine) Vadym Dovhanyuk	(Russia) Andrey Shurbenkov	(Poland) Jacek Wiak
2012 Mariupol	(Luxembourg) Anibal Coimbra	(Russia) Andrey Shurbenkov	(Ukraine) Dmytro Semenenko
2013 Plzeň	(Luxembourg) Anibal Coimbra	(Ukraine) Oleksiy Bychkov	(Russia) Andrey Shurbenkov
2014 Sofia	(Russia) Yury Belkin	(Norway) Stian Walgermo	(Ukraine) Dmytro Semenenko
2015 Chemnitz	(Norway) Stian Walgermo	(Ukraine) Dmytro Semenenko	(France) Sofiane Belkesir
2016 Plzeň	(Norway) Stian Walgermo	(France) Sofiane Belkesir	(Norway) Kristoffer Skadsem Eikeland
2017 Malaga	(Russia) Sergey Mashintsov	(France) Sofiane Belkesir	(Norway) Stian Walgermo
2018 Plzeň	(Russia) Sergey Mashintsov	(Ukraine) Viktor Leskovets	(France) Allan Grenier
2019 Plzeň	(Ukraine) Sergii Bilyi	(Ukraine) Danylo Kovalov	(France) Allan Grenier
2020 Thisted	Cancelled due to the COVID-19 pandemic		
2021 Plzeň	(Ukraine) Danylo Kovalov	(France) Allan Grenier	(Slovakia) Kristián Slíž
2022 Plzeň	(Ukraine) Sergii Bilyi	(Ukraine) Oleksandr Rubets	(Norway) Asgeir Hoel
2023 Thisted	(Ukraine) Oleksandr Rubets	(Denmark) Nicki Lentz	(Norway) Asgeir Hoel

=== -120 kg ===
Meet	Gold	Silver	Bronze
2011 Plzeň	(Bulgaria) Ivaylo Hristov	(Ukraine) Valeriy Karpov	(Russia) Vasiliy Omelchenko
2012 Mariupol	(Ukraine) Oleksiy Rokochiy	(Bulgaria) Ivaylo Hristov	(Russia) Igor Gagin
2013 Plzeň	(Bulgaria) Ivaylo Hristov	(Ukraine) Oleksiy Rokochiy	(Ukraine) Roman Voroshylin
2014 Sofia	(Ukraine) Oleksiy Bychkov	(Bulgaria) Ivaylo Hristov	(United Kingdom) Dean Bowring
2015 Chemnitz	(Ukraine) Oleksiy Bychkov	(Russia) Aleksei Fokin	(Russia) Ivan Goriachev
2016 Plzeň	(Ukraine) Oleksiy Rokochiy	(Czech Republic) Tomáš Šárik	(Netherlands) Jordy Snijders
2017 Malaga	(Belgium) Orhan Bilican	(Russia) Ivan Goriachev	(Czech Republic) Tomáš Šárik
2018 Plzeň	(United Kingdom) Tony Cliffe	(France) Sofiane Belkesir	(Russia) Ivan Goriachev
2019 Plzeň	(Ukraine) Oleksiy Bychkov	(France) Sofiane Belkesir	(Russia) Maksim Beznosov
2020 Thisted	Cancelled due to the COVID-19 pandemic		
2021 Plzeň	(Ukraine) Oleksandr Rubets	(France) Sofiane Belkesir	(Germany) Dominik Pahl
2022 Plzeň	(France) Sofiane Belkesir	(Ukraine) Viktor Leskovets	(Germany) Christoph Seefeld
2023 Thisted	(France) Sofiane Belkesir	(Ukraine) Danylo Konovalov	(Ukraine) Viktor Leskovets

=== 120+ kg ===
Meet	Gold	Silver	Bronze
2011 Plzeň	(Ukraine) Volodymyr Svistunov	(Russia) Andrey Konovalov	(United Kingdom) Dean Bowring
2012 Mariupol	(Norway) Carl Yngvar Christensen	(Ukraine) Volodymyr Svistunov	(Finland) Kenneth Sandvik
2013 Plzeň	(Finland) Kenneth Sandvik	(Norway) Martin Rønning	(Iceland) Audunn Jónsson
2014 Sofia	(Norway) Carl Yngvar Christensen	(Norway) Hans Magne Bårtvedt	(Ukraine) Volodymyr Svistunov
2015 Chemnitz	(Ukraine) Volodymyr Svistunov	(Norway) Hans Magne Bårtvedt	(Czech Republic) David Lupáč
2016 Plzeň	(Russia) Andrey Konovalov	(Norway) Hans Magne Bårtvedt	(Ukraine) Volodymyr Svistunov
2017 Malaga	(Ukraine) Volodymyr Svistunov	(Norway) Hans Magne Bårtvedt	(Russia) Artem Litvinenko
2018 Plzeň	(Ukraine) Volodymyr Svistunov	(Russia) Artem Litvinenko	(Czech Republic) David Lupáč
2019 Plzeň	(Russia) Maksim Prokhorov	(Iceland) Júlían J. K. Jóhannsson	(Slovakia) Róbert Valach
2020 Thisted	Cancelled due to the COVID-19 pandemic		
2021 Plzeň	(Ukraine) Andrii Shevchenko	(Ukraine) Viktor Holinei	(Iceland) Júlían J. K. Jóhannsson
2022 Plzeň	(Ukraine) Viktor Holinei	(Czech Republic) Jaroslav Šoukal	(United Kingdom) Ranbir Sahota
2023 Thisted	(Germany) Christoph Seefeld	(United Kingdom) Jordan Bollard	(Denmark) Martin Dreyer

== Old categories ==
=== -52 kg ===
Meet	Gold	Silver	Bronze
1978 Birmingham	(United Kingdom) Narendra Bhairo	(Finland) Keijo Vähäkuopus	Only 2 classified athletes
1979 Huskvarna	(United Kingdom) Narendra Bhairo	(Finland) Keijo Vähäkuopus	(Sweden) Leif Josefsson
1980 Zurich	(United Kingdom) Narendra Bhairo	(Italy) Pierluigi Paoli	(Switzerland) Patrice Wermuth
1981 Parma	(United Kingdom) Phil Stringer	(Italy) Giorgio Fontana	(Finland) Aimo Tuomisto
1982 Munich	(United Kingdom) Phil Stringer	(Sweden) Anders Eriksson	(Italy) Giuseppe Fontana
1983 Mariehamn	(United Kingdom) Phil Stringer	(Finland) Kari Ylijoki	Only 2 classified athletes
1984 Fredrikstad	(Finland) Kari Ojalehto	(United Kingdom) John Maxwell	(Austria) Johann Mandl
1985 Hague	(Finland) Kari Ojalehto	(Netherlands) Tom Dassen	Only 2 classified athletes
1986 Stockholm	(Finland) Kari Ojalehto	(United Kingdom) John Maxwell	(Czechoslovakia) Stefan Kolsovski
1987 Birmingham	(Finland) Kari Ojalehto	(United Kingdom) John Clay	(United Kingdom) John Maxwell
1988 Murnau	(United Kingdom) John Maxwell	(Finland) Kari Ojalehto	(Finland) Kari Ylijoki
1989 Lahti	(Finland) Kari Ojalehto	(Czechoslovakia) Dušan Skirkanič	(United Kingdom) John Maxwell
1990 Reykjavik	(United Kingdom) John Clay	(Sweden) Mats Forsberg	(Iceland) Helgi Jónsson
1991 Chapelle la Grande	(United Kingdom) John Clay	(Russia) Sergey Zhuravlev	(Czechoslovakia) Dušan Skirkanič
1992 Horsens	(Russia) Sergey Zhuravlev	(United Kingdom) John Clay	(Poland) Andrzej Stanaszek
1993 Wemding	(Poland) Andrzej Stanaszek	(France) Laurent Bach	Only 2 classified athletes
1994 Pitea	(Russia) Sergey Zhuravlev	(Poland) Andrzej Stanaszek	(Spain) Manuel Martinez
1995 Moscow	(Poland) Andrzej Stanaszek	(Russia) Sergey Zhuravlev	(Norway) Roy Brandtzæg
1996 Siofok	(Poland) Andrzej Stanaszek	(Norway) Roy Brandtzæg	(Russia) Jaroslav Tchopovski
1997 Birmingham	(Poland) Andrzej Stanaszek	(Russia) Sergey Zhuravlev	(United Kingdom) John Clay
1998 Sotkamo	(Poland) Andrzej Stanaszek	(Russia) Vyacheslav Gorbunov	(Germany) Christian Klein
1999 Pułtusk	(Russia) Sergey Zhuravlev	(Ukraine) Alexander Degovets	(Poland) Dariusz Wszoła
2000 Riesa	(Poland) Andrzej Stanaszek	(Poland) Dariusz Wszoła	(Denmark) Alan Vith
2001 Syktyvkar	(Poland) Andrzej Stanaszek	(Russia) Sergey Zhuravlev	(Poland) Dariusz Wszoła
2002 Eskilstuna	(Poland) Andrzej Stanaszek	(Russia) Ravil Kazakov	(Poland) Dariusz Wszoła
2003 Sofia	(Russia) Sergey Fedosienko	(Poland) Andrzej Stanaszek	Only 2 classified athletes
2004 Nymburk	(Russia) Sergey Fedosienko	(Poland) Dariusz Wszoła	(United Kingdom) Patrick Constantine
2005 Hamm	(United Kingdom) Patrick Constantine	(Poland) Tomasz Zambrzycki	Only 2 classified athletes
2006 Prostejov	(Poland) Dariusz Wszoła	(Russia) Aleksey Romanov	(United Kingdom) Patrick Constantine

=== -56 kg ===
Meet	Gold	Silver	Bronze
1978 Birmingham	(Finland) Jari Haatenen	(Finland) Jarmo Niemi	(United Kingdom) Phil Stringer
1979 Huskvarna	(Finland) Yrjö Haatanen	(Finland) Juhani Niemi	(United Kingdom) Phil Stringer
1980 Zurich	(Finland) Juhani Niemi	(Republic of Ireland) Antony Collins	(Germany) Günther Icks
1981 Parma	(Finland) Juhani Niemi	(Finland) Yrjö Haatanen	(United Kingdom) Narendra Bhairo
1982 Munich	(United Kingdom) Narendra Bhairo	(France) J. Abit-Bol	(Switzerland) Patrick Wermuth
1983 Mariehamn	(United Kingdom) Narendra Bhairo	(Sweden) Alwi Eriksson	(Finland) Kari Ojalehto
1984 Fredrikstad	(United Kingdom) Phil Stringer	(Sweden) Allan Eriksson	Only 2 classified athletes
1985 Hague	(United Kingdom) Phil Stringer	(Finland) Yrjö Haatanen	(Sweden) Mats Forsberg
1986 Stockholm	(Finland) Yussi Haatanen	(Sweden) Lars Flyborg	(Switzerland) Paul Wermuth
1987 Birmingham	(Finland) Yrjö Haatanen	(West Germany) Bernd Von Döllen	(France) Bernard Vincent
1988 Murnau	(Republic of Ireland) Gerard McNamara	(United Kingdom) Gary Simes	(France) Bernard Vincent
1989 Lahti	(United Kingdom) Gary Simes	(France) Bernard Vincent	(Finland) Kai Vähäluopus
1990 Reykjavik	(United Kingdom) Gary Simes	(Germany) Klemen Jaschinski	(Finland) Asko Sirviö
1991 Chapelle la Grande	(United Kingdom) Gary Simes	(Germany) Klemen Jaschinski	(Belgium) Wim Elyn
1992 Horsens	(Belgium) Wim Elyn	(Sweden) Magnus Karlsson	(Germany) Klemen Jaschinski
1993 Wemding	(United Kingdom) Gary Simes	(Sweden) Magnus Karlsson	(Germany) Klemen Jaschinski
1994 Pitea	(Bulgaria) Ivelin Petrov	(Sweden) Magnus Karlsson	(Austria) Jürgen Nemeth
1995 Moscow	(Russia) Konstantin Pavlov	(Slovakia) Dušan Skirkanič	(Ukraine) Sergiy Vatyuk
1996 Siofok	(Bulgaria) Ivelin Petrov	(France) Patrick Legard	(Austria) Jürgen Nemeth
1997 Birmingham	(Norway) Roy Brandtzæg	(Russia) Konstantin Pavlov	(Austria) Jürgen Nemeth
1998 Sotkamo	(Russia) Konstantin Pavlov	(Norway) Roy Brandtzæg	(Austria) Jürgen Nemeth
1999 Pułtusk	(Russia) Konstantin Pavlov	(Norway) Roy Brandtzæg	(Austria) Jürgen Nemeth
2000 Riesa	(Russia) Konstantin Pavlov	(Norway) Roy Brandtzæg	(Austria) Jürgen Nemeth
2001 Syktyvkar	(Russia) Konstantin Pavlov	(Norway) Roy Brandtzæg	(Ukraine) Sergiy Vatyuk
2002 Eskilstuna	(Russia) Konstantin Pavlov	(Poland) Sławomir Śledź	(Ukraine) Sergiy Vatyuk
2003 Sofia	(Russia) Konstantin Pavlov	(Russia) Fan Mukhamatyanov	(Ukraine) Sergiy Vatyuk
2004 Nymburk	(Russia) Konstantin Pavlov	(Sweden) Thomas Wulfeld	(Denmark) Morten Rasmussen
2005 Hamm	(Russia) Konstantin Pavlov	(Poland) Dariusz Wszoła	(France) Frédéric Tinebra
2006 Prostejov	(Russia) Konstantin Pavlov	(France) Frédéric Tinebra	(Poland) Paweł Ośmiałowski
2007 Kościan	(Poland) Dariusz Wszoła	(Norway) Roy Brandtzæg	(France) Frédéric Tinebra
2008 Frýdek-Místek	(Poland) Dariusz Wszoła	(France) Frédéric Tinebra	(Poland) Paweł Ośmiałowski
2009 Ylitornio	(Poland) Dariusz Wszoła	(Poland) Paweł Ośmiałowski	(France) Frédéric Tinebra
2010 Köping	(Poland) Dariusz Wszoła	(Poland) Paweł Ośmiałowski	(United Kingdom) Patrick Constantine

=== -60 kg ===
Meet	Gold	Silver	Bronze
1978 Birmingham	(United Kingdom) Eddy Pengelly	(Finland) Anteri Keykka	(Sweden) Mats Johansson
1979 Huskvarna	(United Kingdom) Eddy Pengelly	(Finland) Antero Köykkä	(Finland) Kullero Lampela
1980 Zurich	(Finland) Kullero Lampela	(Spain) Apolon Rodriganez	(Republic of Ireland) Francis McCarthy
1981 Parma	(United Kingdom) Tony Galvez	(Finland) Kullero Lampela	(Belgium) Eddy van Wemmel
1982 Munich	(Finland) Kullero Lampela	(Sweden) Göran Henrysson	(Belgium) Eddy van Wemmel
1983 Mariehamn	(Sweden) Göran Henrysson	(United Kingdom) Dave Mannering	(Belgium) Eddy van Wemmel
1984 Fredrikstad	(Sweden) Göran Henrysson	(Sweden) Niclas Yngvesson	(United Kingdom) Carl Lewis
1985 Hague	(Finland) Kullero Lampela	(United Kingdom) Dave Mannering	(Sweden) Göran Henrysson
1986 Stockholm	(France) Lucien DeFaria	(Netherlands) Gerard Tromp	(Germany) Peter Lux
1987 Birmingham	(Netherlands) Gerard Tromp	(France) Lucien DeFaria	(United Kingdom) Clint Lewis
1988 Murnau	(Netherlands) Gerard Tromp	(France) Lucien DeFaria	(Czechoslovakia) Anton Mihok
1989 Lahti	(Netherlands) Gerard Tromp	(France) Lucien DeFaria	(Republic of Ireland) Gerard McNamara
1990 Reykjavik	(Republic of Ireland) Gerard McNamara	(France) Lucien DeFaria	(France) Bernard Vincent
1991 Chapelle la Grande	(Netherlands) Gerard Tromp	(Republic of Ireland) Gerard McNamara	(France) Lucien DeFaria
1992 Horsens	(Russia) Genady Chetin	(Netherlands) Gerard Tromp	(Czechoslovakia) Anton Mihok
1993 Wemding	(Republic of Ireland) Gerard McNamara	(Finland) Asko Sirviö	(Belgium) Ronny Celis
1994 Pitea	(Belgium) Wim Elyn	(Belgium) Ronny Celis	(United Kingdom) Phil Richard
1995 Moscow	(Belgium) Wim Elyn	(Bulgaria) Ivelin Petrov	(Russia) Vladimir Ryazanov
1996 Siofok	(Belgium) Wim Elyn	(United Kingdom) Gary Simes	(Netherlands) Gerard Tromp
1997 Birmingham	(Belgium) Wim Elyn	(Russia) Alexei Sidorov	(Netherlands) Gerard Tromp
1998 Sotkamo	(Belgium) Wim Elyn	(Sweden) Amit Selberg	(Estonia) Janek Nurmeots
1999 Pułtusk	(Belgium) Wim Elyn	(Russia) Mikhail Andrukhin	(Latvia) Vladimir Morozovs
2000 Riesa	(Russia) Mikhail Andrukhin	(United Kingdom) Phil Richard	(Poland) Mariusz Olech
2001 Syktyvkar	(Russia) Mikhail Andrukhin	(Poland) Mariusz Olech	(Germany) Ingo Richter
2002 Eskilstuna	(Russia) Mikhail Andrukhin	(Ukraine) Vitaliy Teteutsa	(Poland) Mariusz Olech
2003 Sofia	(Russia) Mikhail Andrukhin	(Ukraine) Vitaliy Teteutsa	(Poland) Mariusz Olech
2004 Nymburk	(Russia) Mikhail Andrukhin	(Poland) Sławomir Śledź	(Bulgaria) Kostadin Batchevanov
2005 Hamm	(Russia) Ayrat Zakiev	(France) Etienne Lited	(Poland) Dominik Golak
2006 Prostejov	(Russia) Ayrat Zakiev	(France) Etienne Lited	(Poland) Dominik Golak
2007 Kościan	(Slovakia) Erik Bačinský	(Poland) Dominik Golak	Only 2 classified athletes
2008 Frýdek-Místek	(France) Etienne Lited	(Poland) Dominik Golak	(Poland) Karol Murawski
2009 Ylitornio	(France) Etienne Lited	(Ukraine) Suradzh Chebotar	(Poland) Dominik Golak
2010 Köping	(Russia) Konstantin Danilov	(France) Etienne Lited	(Poland) Dominik Golak

=== -67.5 kg ===
Meet	Gold	Silver	Bronze
1978 Birmingham	(United Kingdom) Des Garner	(Norway) Kåre Holt	(Norway) Svein Zachariassen
1979 Huskvarna	(United Kingdom) Pal Dhuram	(United Kingdom) Des Garner	(Norway) Kåre Holt
1980 Zurich	(United Kingdom) Hassan Salih	(United Kingdom) Steve Alexander	(Republic of Ireland) Bernhard Fenessey
1981 Parma	(United Kingdom) Eddy Pengelly	(Sweden) Stefan Nentis	(Finland) Veijo Karvinen
1982 Munich	(Sweden) Stefan Nentis	(United Kingdom) Eddy Pengelly	(Switzerland) Luigi Pedrazzi
1983 Mariehamn	(United Kingdom) Eddy Pengelly	(Finland) Veijo Karvinen	(Switzerland) Luigi Pedrazzi
1984 Fredrikstad	(United Kingdom) Eddy Pengelly	(Iceland) Kari Elison	(Belgium) Jan Theys
1985 Hague	(United Kingdom) Eddy Pengelly	(Iceland) Kari Elison	(Belgium) Jan Theys
1986 Stockholm	(United Kingdom) Eddy Pengelly	(Belgium) Franci Mezzanotte	(Iceland) Kari Elison
1987 Birmingham	(United Kingdom) Eddy Pengelly	(Sweden) Stefan Nentis	(Norway) Steinar Fredheim
1988 Murnau	(United Kingdom) Eddy Pengelly	(Belgium) Frank van Wemmel	(West Germany) Peter Lux
1989 Lahti	(United Kingdom) Eddy Pengelly	(United Kingdom) Dave Mannering	(Finland) Tuomo Kesälahti
1990 Reykjavik	(Poland) Jan Wilczyński	(United Kingdom) Dave Mannering	(Finland) Tuomo Kesälahti
1991 Chapelle la Grande	(Poland) Jan Wilczyński	(France) Kader Baali	(Czechoslovakia) Josef Trnka
1992 Horsens	(United Kingdom) Rodney Hypolite	(Poland) Jan Wilczyński	(Finland) Jussi Huhtanen
1993 Wemding	(United Kingdom) Rodney Hypolite	(Poland) Jan Wilczyński	(Slovakia) Josef Trnka
1994 Pitea	(United Kingdom) Rodney Hypolite	(Poland) Jan Wilczyński	(Germany) Günther Icks
1995 Moscow	(United Kingdom) Rodney Hypolite	(Poland) Jan Wilczyński	(Finland) Sakari Selkainoho
1996 Siofok	(Russia) Viktor Baranov	(United Kingdom) Rodney Hypolite	(Finland) Janne Ollila
1997 Birmingham	(Russia) Viktor Baranov	(Poland) Jan Wilczyński	(United Kingdom) Rodney Hypolite
1998 Sotkamo	(Poland) Jarosław Olech	(Russia) Evgeny Dolgov	(Poland) Jan Wilczyński
1999 Pułtusk	(Poland) Jarosław Olech	(France) Hassan El Belghiti	(United Kingdom) Richard Batchelor
2000 Riesa	(Poland) Jarosław Olech	(Poland) Jan Wilczyński	(France) Hassan El Belghiti
2001 Syktyvkar	(Poland) Jarosław Olech	(Russia) Evgeniy Dolgov	(Italy) Roberto Sacco
2002 Eskilstuna	(Poland) Jarosław Olech	(Italy) Roberto Sacco	(Russia) Evgeniy Dolgov
2003 Sofia	(Poland) Jarosław Olech	(Sweden) Amit Selberg	(Bulgaria) Vihar Mitev
2004 Nymburk	(Poland) Jarosław Olech	(Russia) Evgeniy Dolgov	(France) Hassan El Belghiti
2005 Hamm	(Poland) Jarosław Olech	(Russia) Nikolay Sokolov	(France) Hassan El Belghiti
2006 Prostejov	(Poland) Jarosław Olech	(Sweden) Amit Selberg	(United Kingdom) Phil Richard
2007 Kościan	(France) Hassan El Belghiti	(United Kingdom) Phil Richard	(Estonia) Peep Päll
2008 Frýdek-Místek	(France) Hassan El Belghiti	(Ukraine) Arkadiy Shalokha	(Estonia) Peep Päll
2009 Ylitornio	(United Kingdom) Phil Richard	(Estonia) Peep Päll	(Estonia) Alo Lille
2010 Köping	(France) Hassan El Belghiti	(Russia) Dmitry Makarov	(United Kingdom) Phil Richard

=== -75 kg ===
Meet	Gold	Silver	Bronze
1978 Birmingham	(United Kingdom) Peter Fiore	(Iceland) Skúli Óskarsson	(Sweden) Lars Backlund
1979 Huskvarna	(Sweden) Lars Backlund	(Sweden) Conny Ulldin	(United Kingdom) Peter Fiore
1980 Zurich	(Sweden) Lars Backlund	(Iceland) Skúli Óskarsson	(United Kingdom) Andy Thomson
1981 Parma	(United Kingdom) Steve Alexander	(Sweden) Lars Backlund	(Italy) Claudio Ardini
1982 Munich	(Finland) Markko Pesonen	(Netherlands) M. Martina	(Norway) T. Andersen
1983 Mariehamn	(United Kingdom) Steve Alexander	(Finland) Jarmo Virtanen	(Netherlands) M. Martina
1984 Fredrikstad	(Italy) Claudio Ardini	(Belgium) Eric Coppin	(Finland) Jari Hietamäki
1985 Hague	(Belgium) Eric Coppin	(Italy) Raffaele Brasile	(Norway) Kare Johansen
1986 Stockholm	(Italy) Raffaele Brasile	(United Kingdom) Andrew Rose	(Sweden) Kare Lundgren
1987 Birmingham	(Finland) Jarmo Virtanen	(United Kingdom) Mike Duffy	(Finland) Hannu Malinen
1988 Murnau	(Finland) Jarmo Virtanen	(Spain) Eduardo Cruz	(Sweden) Kare Lundgren
1989 Lahti	(Finland) Markku Pesonen	(Finland) Leo Tuominen	(Netherlands) Harry van den Brand
1990 Reykjavik	(Finland) Markku Pesonen	(Finland) Ari-Jukka Mäkitalo	(Norway) Sigve Valentinsen
1991 Chapelle la Grande	(Finland) Ari Virtanen	(Finland) Leo Tuominen	(Czechoslovakia) Stanislav Hoza
1992 Horsens	(Finland) Jarmo Laine	(Iceland) Kari Elison	(Russia) Grigory Dernov
1993 Wemding	(Ukraine) Sirazhiti Bazayev	(Finland) Pekka Antila	(Sweden) Per Berglund
1994 Pitea	(Sweden) Per Berglund	(Norway) Sigve Valentinsen	(France) Kader Baali
1995 Moscow	(Ukraine) Sirazhiti Bazayev	(Finland) Jarmo Laine	(Netherlands) Jan Theys
1996 Siofok	(Sweden) Per Berglund	(Ukraine) Dmytro Solovyov	(Ukraine) Sirazhiti Bazayev
1997 Birmingham	(Ukraine) Dmytro Solovyov	(Ukraine) Sirazhiti Bazayev	(Russia) Alexei Nemtsev
1998 Sotkamo	(Russia) Viktor Furazhkin	(Poland) Jan Wegiera	(Netherlands) Jan Theys
1999 Pułtusk	(Russia) Viktor Furazhkin	(Russia) Viktor Baranov	(Poland) Jan Wegiera
2000 Riesa	(Russia) Viktor Furazhkin	(Ukraine) Sirazhiti Bazayev	(Russia) Viktor Baranov
2001 Syktyvkar	(Russia) Viktor Furazhkin	(Russia) Viktor Baranov	(Sweden) Hans Andersson
2002 Eskilstuna	(Russia) Viktor Furazhkin	(Ukraine) Oleksandr Kutcher	(Poland) Jarosław Spychała
2003 Sofia	(Russia) Viktor Furazhkin	(Russia) Viktor Baranov	(Poland) Jacek Spychała
2004 Nymburk	(Ukraine) Oleksandr Borysov	(Poland) Jacek Spychała	(Italy) Roberto Sacco
2005 Hamm	(Poland) Jacek Spychała	(Russia) Dmitriy Dvornikov	(Slovakia) Peter Vateha
2006 Prostejov	(Russia) Alexander Gromov	(Poland) Jacek Spychała	(Russia) Artem Korptygin
2007 Kościan	(Poland) Jarosław Olech	(Poland) Jacek Spychała	(Bulgaria) Todor Vasilev
2008 Frýdek-Místek	(Poland) Jarosław Olech	(Ukraine) Volodymyr Rysiev	(Finland) Sami Nieminen
2009 Ylitornio	(Poland) Jarosław Olech	(Finland) Sami Nieminen	(France) Kader Baali
2010 Köping	(Ukraine) Arkadiy Shalokha	(Russia) Alexander Gromov	(Ukraine) Irakli Mdivnishvili

=== -82.5 kg ===
Meet	Gold	Silver	Bronze
1978 Birmingham	(United Kingdom) Ron Collins	(United Kingdom) Bill West	(Sweden) Kenneth Mattson
1979 Huskvarna	(United Kingdom) Bill West	(Sweden) Kenneth Mattson	(Norway) Atle Edvardsen
1980 Zurich	(United Kingdom) Ron Collins	(United Kingdom) Bill West	(Finland) Jari Tähtinen
1981 Parma	(United Kingdom) Ron Collins	(United Kingdom) Bill West	(Finland) Jari Tähtinen
1982 Munich	(United Kingdom) Mike Duffy	(Germany) Max Stamm	(Finland) Jari Hietamäki
1983 Mariehamn	(Sweden) Lars Backlund	(United Kingdom) Mike Duffy	(Netherlands) Janus Schneider
1984 Fredrikstad	(United Kingdom) Steve Alexander	(Italy) Floreano Domenici	(Finland) Hannu Malinen
1985 Hague	(Italy) Claudio Ardini	(Finland) Jarmo Virtanen	(United Kingdom) Mike Duffy
1986 Stockholm	(Finland) Jarmo Virtanen	(United Kingdom) Mike Duffy	(Norway) Kare Johansen
1987 Birmingham	(Belgium) Eric Coppin	(Republic of Ireland) Tom Ward	(Norway) Ove Hansen
1988 Murnau	(Italy) Raffaele Brasile	(Finland) Hannu Malinen	(Italy) Davide Cantoni
1989 Lahti	(Finland) Jarmo Virtanen	(Italy) Raffaele Brasile	(Spain) Eduardo Cruz
1990 Reykjavik	(Finland) Jarmo Virtanen	(Poland) Jan Łuka	(Finland) Jari Tähtinen
1991 Chapelle la Grande	(Soviet Union) Aleksander Lekomzev	(Netherlands) Piet van Haaren	(Poland) Roman Szymkowiak
1992 Horsens	(Finland) Jarmo Virtanen	(Czechoslovakia) Valery Bohonev	(Poland) Roman Szymkowiak
1993 Wemding	(United Kingdom) David Carter	(Czech Republic) Peter Theuser	(Finland) Hannu Malinen
1994 Pitea	(Poland) Roman Szymkowiak	(Czech Republic) Peter Theuser	(United Kingdom) David Carter
1995 Moscow	(Poland) Roman Szymkowiak	(Finland) Markku Vierikko	(Russia) Alex Korotchenko
1996 Siofok	(Poland) Roman Szymkowiak	(Czech Republic) Peter Theuser	(Russia) Alex Korotchenko
1997 Birmingham	(Ukraine) Vasiliy Kurtiak	(Russia) Dmitri Fedenko	(Poland) Roman Szymkowiak
1998 Sotkamo	(Ukraine) Dmytro Solovyov	(Poland) Roman Szymkowiak	(Russia) Sergey Mor
1999 Pułtusk	(Ukraine) Dmytro Solovyov	(United Kingdom) Anthony Thornton	(Netherlands) Ab Bruggink
2000 Riesa	(Russia) Sergey Mor	(Ukraine) Dmytro Solovyov	(France) Frédéric Gandner
2001 Syktyvkar	(Russia) Sergey Mor	(Ukraine) Ivan Shlyakhta	(Russia) Sergey Gordeev
2002 Eskilstuna	(Ukraine) Dmytro Solovyov	(Poland) Jan Wegiera	(Sweden) Patrik Turesson
2003 Sofia	(Ukraine) Sergiy Naleykin	(Ukraine) Dmytro Solovyov	(Sweden) Patrik Turesson
2004 Nymburk	(Russia) Viktor Furazhkin	(Poland) Jan Wegiera	(Russia) Pavel Ozerov
2005 Hamm	(Russia) Sergey Bogdanov	(Poland) Jan Wegiera	(Bulgaria) Robert Michailov
2006 Prostejov	(Russia) Sergey Bogdanov	(Poland) Jan Wegiera	(France) Frédéric Gandner
2007 Kościan	(Poland) Jan Wegiera	(Finland) Jouni Kvist	(France) Frédéric Gandner
2008 Frýdek-Místek	(Poland) Jan Wegiera	(Bulgaria) Robert Michailov	(France) Frédéric Gandner
2009 Ylitornio	(Poland) Daniel Miller	(Ukraine) Volodymyr Rysiev	(Bulgaria) Robert Michailov
2010 Köping	(Ukraine) Andriy Naniev	(Ukraine) Volodymyr Rysiev	(Russia) Evgeniy Vasyukov

=== -90 kg ===
Meet	Gold	Silver	Bronze
1978 Birmingham	(United Kingdom) Edmond Toal	(Finland) Unto Honkonen	(Sweden) Conny Nilsson
1979 Huskvarna	(Finland) Unto Honkonen	(Norway) Per Kristian Simonsen	(Sweden) Conny Nilsson
1980 Zurich	(Sweden) Kenneth Mattson	(Sweden) Conny Nilsson	(Spain) Jose Rodriguez
1981 Parma	(Sweden) Conny Nilsson	(Sweden) Kenneth Mattson	(Iceland) Sverrir Hjaltason
1982 Munich	(United Kingdom) Bill West	(Belgium) Hugo De Grauwe	(Sweden) Ove Eriksson
1983 Mariehamn	(Sweden) Kenneth Mattson	(United Kingdom) Dave Caldwell	(United Kingdom) Bill West
1984 Fredrikstad	(United Kingdom) Bill West	(Belgium) Hugo De Grauwe	(Denmark) Per Simonsen
1985 Hague	(United Kingdom) Dave Caldwell	(Italy) Floreano Dominici	(Finland) Sulo Kierivaara
1986 Stockholm	(United Kingdom) Dave Caldwell	(United Kingdom) Bill West	(Italy) Floreano Dominici
1987 Birmingham	(Finland) Juha Hyttinen	(Sweden) Kenneth Mattson	(United Kingdom) Dave Caldwell
1988 Murnau	(Italy) Claudio Ardini	(Finland) Juha Hyttinen	(Italy) Floriano Domenici
1989 Lahti	(Italy) Floriano Domenici	(Finland) Sammy Arling	(Netherlands) Ad Schenkels
1990 Reykjavik	(Italy) Floreano Domenici	(Iceland) Jon Gunnarson	(Finland) Kimmo Ilmanen
1991 Chapelle la Grande	(Soviet Union) Valery Kuznetsov	(Poland) Jan Łuka	(Finland) Arto Rajala
1992 Horsens	(Italy) Damiano Crocitto	(Czechoslovakia) Fjodor Tosunidi	(Russia) Valery Kuznetsov
1993 Wemding	(Germany) Frank Schramm	(Italy) Damiano Crocitto	(Ukraine) Volodimir Uhach
1994 Pitea	(Germany) Frank Schramm	(Norway) Carl Olav Christoffersen	(Russia) Alexander Lecomcev
1995 Moscow	(Ukraine) Volodimir Uhach	(Finland) Janne Toivanen	(Russia) Alexandr Dykhanov
1996 Siofok	(Finland) Janne Toivanen	(Russia) Alexandr Dykhanov	(Norway) Erik Stiklestad
1997 Birmingham	(Norway) Erik Stiklestad	(Russia) Alexandr Dykhanov	(Norway) Frode Gundersen
1998 Sotkamo	(Russia) Alexandr Dykhanov	(Russia) Vitali Gluboki	(Ukraine) Sergey Romanenko
1999 Pułtusk	(Russia) Andrey Tarasenko	(Ukraine) Sergey Romanenko	(Lithuania) Andrius Gecas
2000 Riesa	(Russia) Andrey Tarasenko	(Czech Republic) Petr Theuser	(Poland) Roman Szymkowiak
2001 Syktyvkar	(Russia) Andrey Tarasenko	(Ukraine) Ivan Freydun	(Czech Republic) Petr Theuser
2002 Eskilstuna	(Russia) Andrey Tarasenko	(Ukraine) Ivan Freydun	(Czech Republic) Petr Theuser
2003 Sofia	(Ukraine) Sergiy Romanenko	(Russia) Dmitriy Fedenko	(Czech Republic) Petr Theuser
2004 Nymburk	(Russia) Andrey Tarasenko	(Poland) Michał Wilk	(Italy) Daniele Ghirardi
2005 Hamm	(Ukraine) Sergiy Romanenko	(Ukraine) Sergiy Pevnyev	(France) André Peeters
2006 Prostejov	(Russia) Andrey Belyaev	(Ukraine) Sergiy Naleykin	(Sweden) Patrik Turesson
2007 Kościan	(Belarus) Andrey Ivanets	(Germany) Mario Kurzendörfer	(Netherlands) Pjotr van den Hoek
2008 Frýdek-Místek	(Ukraine) Andriy Krymov	(Bulgaria) Zdravko Sarafimov	(Ukraine) Dmytro Chumakov
2009 Ylitornio	(Poland) Jan Wegiera	(Estonia) Margus Silbaum	(Ukraine) Andriy Krymov
2010 Köping	(Ukraine) Andriy Krymov	(Bulgaria) Zdravko Sarafimov	(Poland) Jan Wegiera

=== -100 kg ===
Meet	Gold	Silver	Bronze
1978 Birmingham	(Sweden) Ray Yvander	(United Kingdom) Raymond Nobile	(Sweden) Rejo Kiviranta
1979 Huskvarna	(Sweden) Ray Yvander	(Sweden) Rejo Kiviranta	(United Kingdom) Raymond Nobile
1980 Zurich	(United Kingdom) Raymond Nobile	(United Kingdom) Tony Stevens	(Norway) Jens Kalleberg
1981 Parma	(United Kingdom) Tony Stevens	(Sweden) Rejo Kiviranta	(Sweden) Ray Yvander
1982 Munich	(Sweden) Kenneth Mattson	(United Kingdom) Tony Stevens	(Finland) Seppo Lukkarinen
1983 Mariehamn	(United Kingdom) Tony Stevens	(Norway) Eric Johanssen	(Finland) Rauno Rinne
1984 Fredrikstad	(United Kingdom) Tony Stevens	(Germany) Miezis Szafranski	(Switzerland) Carl Badan
1985 Hague	(United Kingdom) Tony Stevens	(Switzerland) Carl Badan	(France) Andre Pollet
1986 Stockholm	(United Kingdom) Tony Stevens	(Sweden) Conny Nilsson	(Belgium) Hugo De Grauwe
1987 Birmingham	(United Kingdom) Tony Stevens	(Sweden) Jonny Melander	(Belgium) Hugo De Grauwe
1988 Murnau	(Finland) Aare Käpylä	(Sweden) Leif Wallander	(United Kingdom) Ralph Farquharson
1989 Lahti	(United Kingdom) Tony Stevens	(Finland) Juha Hyttinen	(Sweden) Jonny Melander
1990 Reykjavik	(Finland) Juha Hyttinen	(Netherlands) Henny Hijmen	(East Germany) Ulrich Rambow
1991 Chapelle la Grande	(Finland) Olavi Rintanen	(Norway) Borge Ovrebo	(Germany) Andreas Schulte
1992 Horsens	(Finland) Rauno Rinne	(Netherlands) Henny Hijmen	(Norway) Borge Ovrebo
1993 Wemding	(Norway) Borge Ovrebo	(Germany) Ulrich Rambow	(Finland) Arto Rajala
1994 Pitea	(Russia) Vladimir Markovsky	(Norway) Borge Ovrebo	(United Kingdom) Sam Watt
1995 Moscow	(Russia) Vladimir Markovsky	(Ukraine) Mihailo Starov	(Ukraine) Volodimir Ivanenko
1996 Siofok	(Russia) Vladimir Markovsky	(Sweden) Jörgen Ljungberg	(Norway) Carl Olav Christoffersen
1997 Birmingham	(Norway) Carl Olav Christoffersen	(Russia) Vladimir Markovsky	(Ukraine) Oleksiy Solovyov
1998 Sotkamo	(Ukraine) Oleksiy Solovyov	(Lithuania) Andrius Gecas	(Norway) Carl Olav Christoffersen
1999 Pułtusk	(Ukraine) Oleksiy Solovyov	(Finland) Pauli Rantanen	(Germany) Reiko Kruse
2000 Riesa	(Norway) Erik Stiklestad	(Norway) Carl Olav Christoffersen	(Poland) Sławomir Ceglarek
2001 Syktyvkar	(Ukraine) Oleksiy Vyshnytskyy	(Norway) Erik Stiklestad	(Poland) Krzysztof Wełna
2002 Eskilstuna	(Russia) Yuriy Fedorenko	(Ukraine) Oleksiy Rokochiy	(Ukraine) Oleksiy Vyshnytskyy
2003 Sofia	(Russia) Maksim Barkhatov	(Russia) Yuriy Fedorenko	(Bulgaria) Ivaylo Hristov
2004 Nymburk	(Russia) Maksim Barkhatov	(Luxembourg) Anibal Coimbra	(Belarus) Andrei Ivanets
2005 Hamm	(Luxembourg) Anibal Coimbra	(Czech Republic) Petr Theuser	(Norway) Tor Herman Omland
2006 Prostejov	(Russia) Andrey Tarasenko	(Luxembourg) Anibal Coimbra	(Bulgaria) Ivaylo Hristov
2007 Kościan	(Luxembourg) Anibal Coimbra	(Poland) Jacek Wiak	(Czech Republic) Petr Theuser
2008 Frýdek-Místek	(Ukraine) Sergiy Pevnyev	(Luxembourg) Anibal Coimbra	(Poland) Jacek Wiak
2009 Ylitornio	(Ukraine) Ivan Freydun	(Poland) Jacek Wiak	(Luxembourg) Anibal Coimbra
2010 Köping	(Luxembourg) Anibal Coimbra	(Belarus) Andrei Ivanets	(France) André Peeters

=== -110 kg ===
Meet	Gold	Silver	Bronze
1978 Birmingham	(Sweden) Ulf Morin	(Finland) Hannu Saarelainen	(Norway) Raider Steen
1979 Huskvarna	(Sweden) Ulf Morin	(Finland) Hannu Saarelainen	(Iceland) Óskar Sigurpálsson
1980 Zurich	(Finland) Hannu Saarelainen	(United Kingdom) Arthur White	(Sweden) Ulf Morin
1981 Parma	(United Kingdom) Arthur White	(Finland) Pauli Mellberg	(Norway) Ralf Larsen
1982 Munich	(Finland) Hannu Saarelainen	(Germany) Klaus Fink	(Spain) Jose Munoz
1983 Mariehamn	(Finland) Samuli Kivi	(Sweden) Conny Nilsson	(Finland) Hannu Saarelainen
1984 Fredrikstad	(Norway) Gunnar Østby	(United Kingdom) Mark Savage	(Finland) Hannu Saarelainen
1985 Hague	(United Kingdom) Mark Savage	(United Kingdom) Raymond Nobile	(Finland) Kyösti Vilmi
1986 Stockholm	(United Kingdom) Mark Savage	(United Kingdom) John Neighbour	(Sweden) Jorma Nikkola
1987 Birmingham	(United Kingdom) John Neighbour	(Norway) Bjoer Kristiansen	(Finland) Samuli Kivi
1988 Murnau	(Sweden) Conny Nilsson	(Norway) Erik Johanssen	(West Germany) Conny de Blois
1989 Lahti	(Finland) Aare Käppylä	(Austria) Leopold Krendl	(Sweden) Leif Wallander
1990 Reykjavik	(Austria) Leopold Krendl	(Finland) Aare Käppylä	(Iceland) Guðni Sigurjónsson
1991 Chapelle la Grande	(Sweden) Jonny Melander	(Netherlands) Piet Faber	(Norway) Sturla Davidsen
1992 Horsens	(Russia) Andrey Mustrikov	(Austria) Leopold Krendl	(Denmark) George Olesen
1993 Wemding	(Finland) Ano Turtiainen	(Netherlands) Piet Faber	(Austria) Franz Siller
1994 Pitea	(Norway) Sturla Davidsen	(Finland) Arto Rajala	(Austria) Anton Tucek
1995 Moscow	(Russia) Nik Platoshechkin	(Finland) Ano Turtiainen	(Russia) Oleg Sliva
1996 Siofok	(Russia) Alexei Gankov	(Russia) Nik Platoshechkin	(Ukraine) Igor Antipenko
1997 Birmingham	(Ukraine) Volodimir Ivanenko	(United Kingdom) Clive Henry	(Sweden) Jörgen Ljungberg
1998 Sotkamo	(Ukraine) Volodimir Ivanenko	(Sweden) Jörgen Ljungberg	(Sweden) David Holmberg
1999 Pułtusk	(Russia) Alexei Gankov	(Ukraine) Volodimir Ivanenko	(United Kingdom) Sam Watt
2000 Riesa	(Sweden) Jörgen Ljungberg	(Ukraine) Volodimir Ivanenko	(Ukraine) Oleksiy Solovyov
2001 Syktyvkar	(Russia) Valentin Dedulia	(Ukraine) Sergiy Makrushyn	(Poland) Tomasz Sabadyn
2002 Eskilstuna	(Russia) Valentin Dedulia	(Sweden) Jörgen Ljungberg	(Ukraine) Viktor Karpik
2003 Sofia	(Russia) Nikolay Suslov	(Ukraine) Oleksiy Solovyov	(Iceland) Audunn Jónsson
2004 Nymburk	(Russia) Nikolay Suslov	(Russia) Igor Medvedev	(Ukraine) Roman Voroshylyn
2005 Hamm	(Russia) Nikolay Suslov	(Belgium) Orhan Bilican	(Finland) Harri Heinila
2006 Prostejov	(Belgium) Orhan Bilican	(Poland) Marian Czarkowski	(Ukraine) Maksym Logosha
2007 Kościan	(Bulgaria) Ivaylo Hristov	(Belgium) Orhan Bilican	(Poland) Marian Czarkowski
2008 Frýdek-Místek	(Ukraine) Valeriy Karpov	(Norway) Tor Herman Omland	(Czech Republic) Tomáš Šárik
2009 Ylitornio	(Belgium) Orhan Bilican	(Norway) Tor Herman Omland	(Poland) Sławomir Ceglarek
2010 Köping	(Ukraine) Valeriy Karpov	(Poland) Jacek Wiak	(Russia) Andrey Shurbenkov

=== -125 kg ===
Meet	Gold	Silver	Bronze
1980 Zurich	(Norway) Raider Steen	(Iceland) Jón Páll Sigmarsson	(Norway) Kjell-Ivar Wien
1981 Parma	(Sweden) Roger Ekström	(Iceland) Jón Páll Sigmarsson	(Norway) Kjell-Ivar Wien
1982 Munich	(Netherlands) Ab Wolders	(Norway) Raider Steen	(Germany) Fritz Seese
1983 Mariehamn	(Finland) Ari Nevenpää	(Iceland) Jón Páll Sigmarsson	(Netherlands) Ab Wolders
1984 Fredrikstad	(Netherlands) Ab Wolders	(Norway) Raider Steen	(Finland) Ari Nevenpää
1985 Hague	(Finland) Ari Nevenpää	(Germany) Herrmann Blank	(Germany) Michael Brügger
1986 Stockholm	(Germany) Herrmann Blank	(Sweden) Gustav Yngvesson	(United Kingdom) Roger Spillane
1987 Birmingham	(Sweden) Lars Norén	(United Kingdom) Sean Spillane	(Denmark) Søren Oldenborg
1988 Murnau	(Sweden) Anders Eriksson	(Denmark) Søren Oldenborg	(West Germany) Man Poschenrieder
1989 Lahti	(Iceland) Magnús Ver Magnússon	(Sweden) Jörgen Lindblad	(Sweden) Anders Eriksson
1990 Reykjavik	(Finland) Kyösti Vilmi	(United Kingdom) John Neighbour	(Iceland) Magnús Ver Magnússon
1991 Chapelle la Grande	(Iceland) Magnús Ver Magnússon	(Netherlands) Rob van der Tak	(Denmark) Søren Oldenborg
1992 Horsens	(Ukraine) Viktor Naleikin	(Austria) Karl Saliger	(Germany) Detlef Glohmann
1993 Wemding	(Germany) Detlef Glohmann	(Austria) Leopold Krendl	(Iceland) Guðni Sigurjónsson
1994 Pitea	(Ukraine) Viktor Naleikin	(Austria) Leopold Krendl	(Netherlands) Piet Faber
1995 Moscow	(Ukraine) Viktor Naleikin	(Germany) Uwe Liedtke	(Austria) Leopold Krendl
1996 Siofok	(Norway) Sturla Davidsen	(Austria) Leopold Krendl	(Finland) Ahti Stark
1997 Birmingham	(Norway) Sturla Davidsen	(Russia) Maxim Podtynny	(Austria) Leopold Krendl
1998 Sotkamo	(Iceland) Audunn Jónsson	(Sweden) Pasi Martikainen	(Russia) Evgeny Birun
1999 Pułtusk	(Russia) Maxim Podtynny	(Ukraine) Viktor Naleikin	(Ukraine) Volodymyr Muravlyov
2000 Riesa	(Ukraine) Volodymyr Muravlyov	(United Kingdom) Dean Bowring	(Austria) Leopold Krendl
2001 Syktyvkar	(Ukraine) Vitaliy Papazov	(Ukraine) Volodymyr Muravlyov	(Russia) Andrey Malanichev
2002 Eskilstuna	(Ukraine) Volodymyr Muravlyov	(Finland) Ove Lehto	(United Kingdom) Dean Bowring
2003 Sofia	(United Kingdom) Clive Henry	(Ukraine) Viktor Karpik	(Finland) Ove Lehto
2004 Nymburk	(Hungary) Istvan Arvai	(Sweden) Jörgen Ljungberg	(Finland) Ove Lehto
2005 Hamm	(United Kingdom) Clive Henry	(Russia) Andrey Malanichev	(Finland) Ove Lehto
2006 Prostejov	(United Kingdom) Dean Bowring	(Germany) Alexander Hoffmann	(Norway) Lars Markussen
2007 Kościan	(Norway) Asbjørn Randen	(United Kingdom) Clive Henry	(United Kingdom) Dean Bowring
2008 Frýdek-Místek	(Ukraine) Oleksandr Shepel	(Norway) Asbjørn Randen	(Finland) Kenneth Sandvik
2009 Ylitornio	(Ukraine) Viktor Testsov	(Finland) Kenneth Sandvik	(Sweden) Stefan Huldén
2010 Köping	(Ukraine) Viktor Testsov	(Russia) Andrey Drachev	(Ukraine) Oleksandr Shepel

=== 110+ kg ===
Meet	Gold	Silver	Bronze
1978 Birmingham	(Finland) Taito Haara	(Finland) Kari Kemppainen	(Sweden) Lars Hedlund
1979 Huskvarna	(Finland) Taito Haara	(Sweden) Lars Hedlund	(United Kingdom) Steven Zetolofsky

=== 125+ kg ===
Meet	Gold	Silver	Bronze
1980 Zurich	(Sweden) Lars Hedlund	(United Kingdom) Andy Kerr	(Germany) Fritz Seese
1981 Parma	(United Kingdom) Andy Kerr	(Iceland) Veli Traustason	(Belgium) Gino Bultinck
1982 Munich	(United Kingdom) Andy Kerr	(Netherlands) Cees de Vreugd	(Germany) Rudolf Küster
1983 Mariehamn	(United Kingdom) Andy Kerr	(Netherlands) Cees de Vreugd	(Germany) Rudolf Küster
1984 Fredrikstad	(United Kingdom) Andy Kerr	(Germany) Rudolf Küster	(Sweden) Yngve Gustavsson
1985 Hague	(United Kingdom) Andy Kerr	(Sweden) Yngve Gustavsson	(Germany) Rudolf Küster
1986 Stockholm	(Sweden) Thomas Stenlund	(Finland) Riku Kiri	(Germany) Man Poschenrieder
1987 Birmingham	(Sweden) Yngve Gustavsson	(Finland) Kyösti Vilmi	(Netherlands) Gerhard Duprie
1988 Murnau	(West Germany) Rudolf Küster	(Sweden) Thomas Stenlund	(France) Jean-Pierre Brulois
1989 Lahti	(France) Jean-Pierre Brulois	(United Kingdom) Peter Tregloan	(West Germany) Rudolf Küster
1990 Reykjavik	(France) Jean-Pierre Brulois	(Austria) Karl Saliger	(Iceland) Hjalti Árnason
1991 Chapelle la Grande	(Germany) Hans Zerhoch	(Finland) Kaj Lindström	(Iceland) Hjalti Árnason
1992 Horsens	(Finland) Kaj Lindström	(Germany) Hans Zerhoch	(Germany) Peter Anker
1993 Wemding	(Germany) Hans Zerhoch	(Germany) Ralf Gierz	(Austria) Karl Saliger
1994 Pitea	(Austria) Karl Saliger	(Germany) Ralf Gierz	(Sweden) Roger Sandström
1995 Moscow	(Ukraine) Yuriy Spinov	(Bulgaria) Evgueniy Popov	(Germany) Ralf Gierz
1996 Siofok	(Hungary) Tibor Mészáros	(Ukraine) Yuriy Spinov	(Russia) Rif Gadiev
1997 Birmingham	(Ukraine) Viktor Naleikin	(Ukraine) Yuriy Spinov	(Netherlands) Corry van Jansen Jorksveld
1998 Sotkamo	(Ukraine) Viktor Naleikin	(Russia) Yuri Fomin	(Austria) Leopold Krendl
1999 Pułtusk	(Russia) Maxim Gurianov	(Lithuania) Žydrūnas Savickas	(Ukraine) Vasiliy Orobets
2000 Riesa	(Russia) Maxim Gurianov	(Lithuania) Žydrūnas Savickas	(Ukraine) Viktor Naleikin
2001 Syktyvkar	(Ukraine) Viktor Naleikin	(Lithuania) Žydrūnas Savickas	(Ukraine) Vasiliy Orobets
2002 Eskilstuna	(Ukraine) Vitaliy Papazov	(Russia) Andrey Malanichev	(Ukraine) Viktor Naleikin
2003 Sofia	(Russia) Andrey Malanichev	(Ukraine) Vasiliy Orobets	(Sweden) Johnny Wahlqvist
2004 Nymburk	(Finland) Kenneth Tallqvist	(Czech Republic) Zdeněk Sedmík	(Hungary) Tibor Mészáros
2005 Hamm	(Russia) Vladimir Bondarenko	(Sweden) Jörgen Ljungberg	(Finland) Jari Martikainen
2006 Prostejov	(Finland) Kenneth Sandvik	(Finland) Jari Martikainen	(Norway) Frode Rui
2007 Kościan	(Finland) Ove Lehto	(Finland) Jari Martikainen	(Sweden) Johnny Wahlqvist
2008 Frýdek-Místek	(Finland) Jari Martikainen	(Germany) Andy-Elvis Dörner	(Czech Republic) Milan Špingl
2009 Ylitornio	(Finland) Jari Martikainen	(Poland) Daniel Grabowski	(Czech Republic) Milan Špingl
2010 Köping	(Poland) Daniel Grabowski	(Czech Republic) Milan Špingl	(Finland) Kenneth Sandvik
