= Powerlifting at the 2005 World Games – Men's lightweight =

Powerlifting men's lightweight at the 2005 World Games
- Venue: Rheinhausenhalle, Duisburg, Germany
- Date: 17 July 2005
- Competitors: 10 from 9 nations

Medalists
gold medal	(Russia) Ravil Kazakov
silver medal	(Chinese Taipei) Hsieh Tsung-ting
bronze medal	(Poland) Dariusz Wszoła

The men's lightweight competition in powerlifting at the 2005 World Games took place on 17 July 2005 at the Rheinhausenhalle in Duisburg, Germany.

== Competition format ==
A total of 10 athletes entered the competition. Each athlete had 3 attempts in each of 3 events: squat, bench press and deadlift. The athlete with the biggest score in Wilks points is the winner.

== Results ==
Rank	Athlete	Nation	Weight	Squat	Bench press	Deadlift	Total weight	Total points
1st place, gold medalist(s)	Ravil Kazakov	Russia	61.20	312.5	215.0	230.0	757.5	634.63
2nd place, silver medalist(s)	Hsieh Tsung-ting	Chinese Taipei	59.75	252.5	180.0	277.5	710.0	607.86
3rd place, bronze medalist(s)	Dariusz Wszoła	Poland	55.85	245.0	150.0	205.0	600.0	547.62
4	Amit Selberg	Sweden	67.25	272.5	187.5	230.0	690.0	533.61
5	Phillip Richard	(United Kingdom) Great Britain	67.45	282.5	175.0	230.0	687.5	530.37
6	Hassan El Belghiti	France	67.50	247.5	152.5	280.0	680.0	524.28
7	Hoang Tran	Canada	56.20	215.0	145.0	215.0	575.0	521.64
8	Huang Lung-hsing	Chinese Taipei	67.50	230.0	170.0	255.0	655.0	505.00
	Hiroyuki Isagawa	Japan	59.60	227.5	NM	-	DSQ	DSQ
	Eric Oishi	Brazil	66.15	245.0	NM	-	DSQ	DSQ
