= Wszoła =

Wszoła is a Polish surname. Notable people with the surname include:

- Dariusz Wszoła (born 1978), Polish powerlifter
- Jacek Wszoła (born 1956), Polish high jumper, Olympic gold medalist
