= Powerlifting at the 2009 World Games – Men's lightweight =

Powerlifting men's lightweight at the 2009 World Games
- Venue: National Sun Yat-sen University, Sun Yat-sen Hall, Kaohsiung, Taiwan
- Date: 25 July 2009
- Competitors: 10 from 7 nations

Medalists
gold medal	(Chinese Taipei) Hsieh Tsung-ting
silver medal	(Ukraine) Arkadiy Shalokha
bronze medal	(France) Hassan El Belghiti

The men's lightweight competition in powerlifting at the 2009 World Games took place on 25 July 2009 at the National Sun Yat-sen University, Sun Yat-sen Hall in Kaohsiung, Taiwan.

== Competition format ==
A total of 10 athletes entered the competition. Each athlete had 3 attempts in each of 3 events: squat, bench press and deadlift. Athlete, who came with the biggest score in Wilks points is the winner.

== Results ==
Rank	Athlete	Nation	Weight	Squat	Bench press	Deadlift	Total weight	Total points
1st place, gold medalist(s)	Hsieh Tsung-ting	Chinese Taipei	60.95	270.0	190.0	272.5	732.5	615.92
2nd place, silver medalist(s)	Arkadiy Shalokha	Ukraine	67.45	290.0	197.5	270.0	757.5	584.37
3rd place, bronze medalist(s)	Hassan El Belghiti	France	67.30	290.0	157.5	302.5	750.0	579.68
4	Dariusz Wszoła	Poland	55.60	245.0	165.0	210.0	620.0	568.42
5	Lin Ming-hui	Chinese Taipei	66.55	267.5	200.0	255.0	722.5	563.48
6	Eric Oishi	Brazil	66.75	275.0	180.0	265.0	720.0	560.16
7	Carlos Garcia	Venezuela	58.95	245.0	162.5	232.5	640.0	554.78
8	Hiroyuki Isagawa	Japan	55.80	205.0	175.0	220.0	600.0	548.10
9	Masaharu Koiwai	Japan	67.25	240.0	177.5	255.0	672.5	520.08
	Etienne Lited	France	60.00	247.5	NM	-	DSQ	DSQ
