= Vinslöv Church =

- Vinslövs kyrka
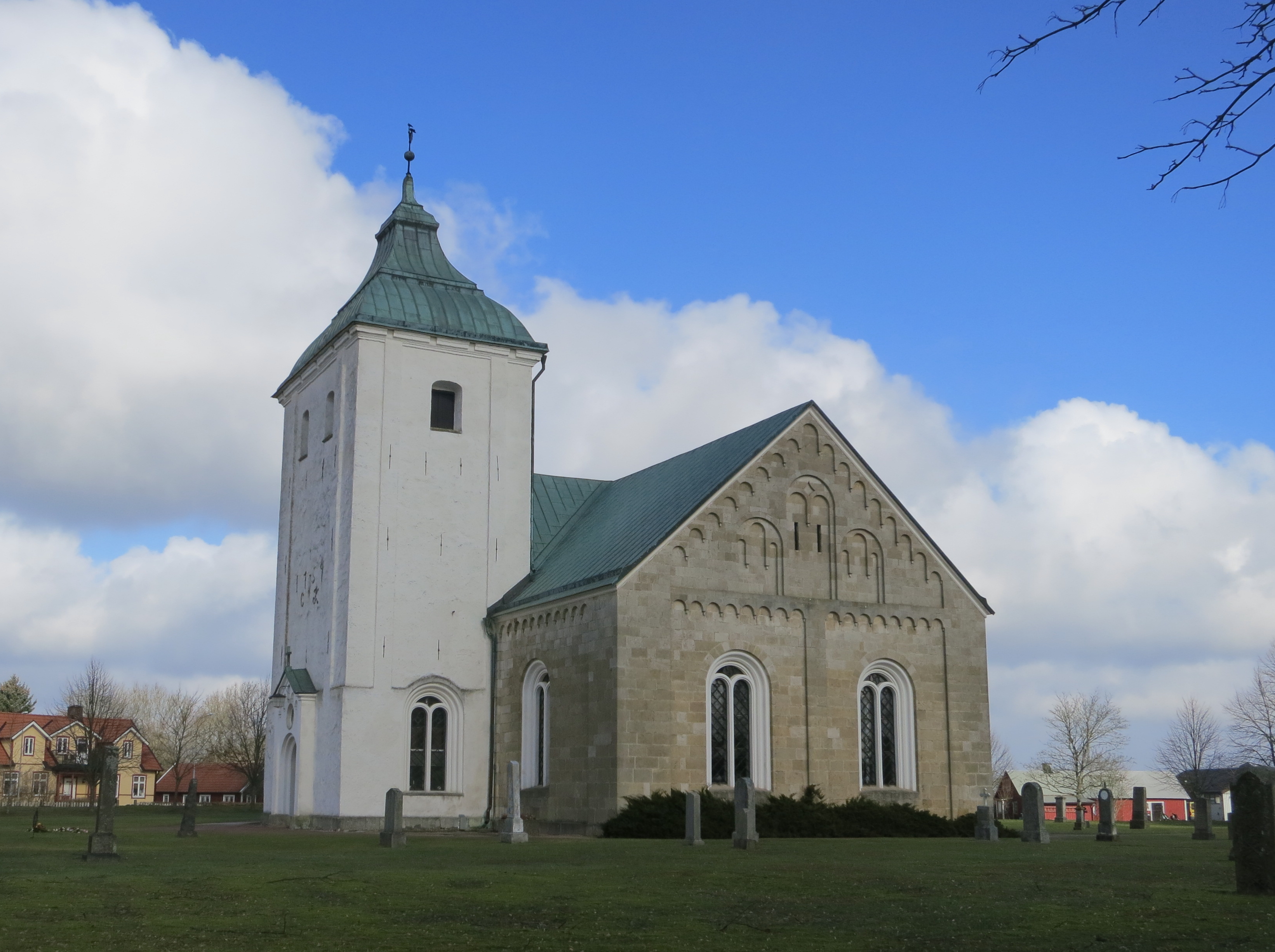
- Vinslöv Church

- Location within Skåne Location within Sweden
- 56°06′28″N 13°54′59″E
- Country: Sweden
- Denomination: Church of Sweden

Vinslöv Church (Swedish: Vinslövs kyrka) is a medieval church in Vinslöv, Scania, Sweden. It belongs to the Church of Sweden. The church contains some of the earliest church murals in Sweden, possibly made by an artist from Lombardy.

== History ==
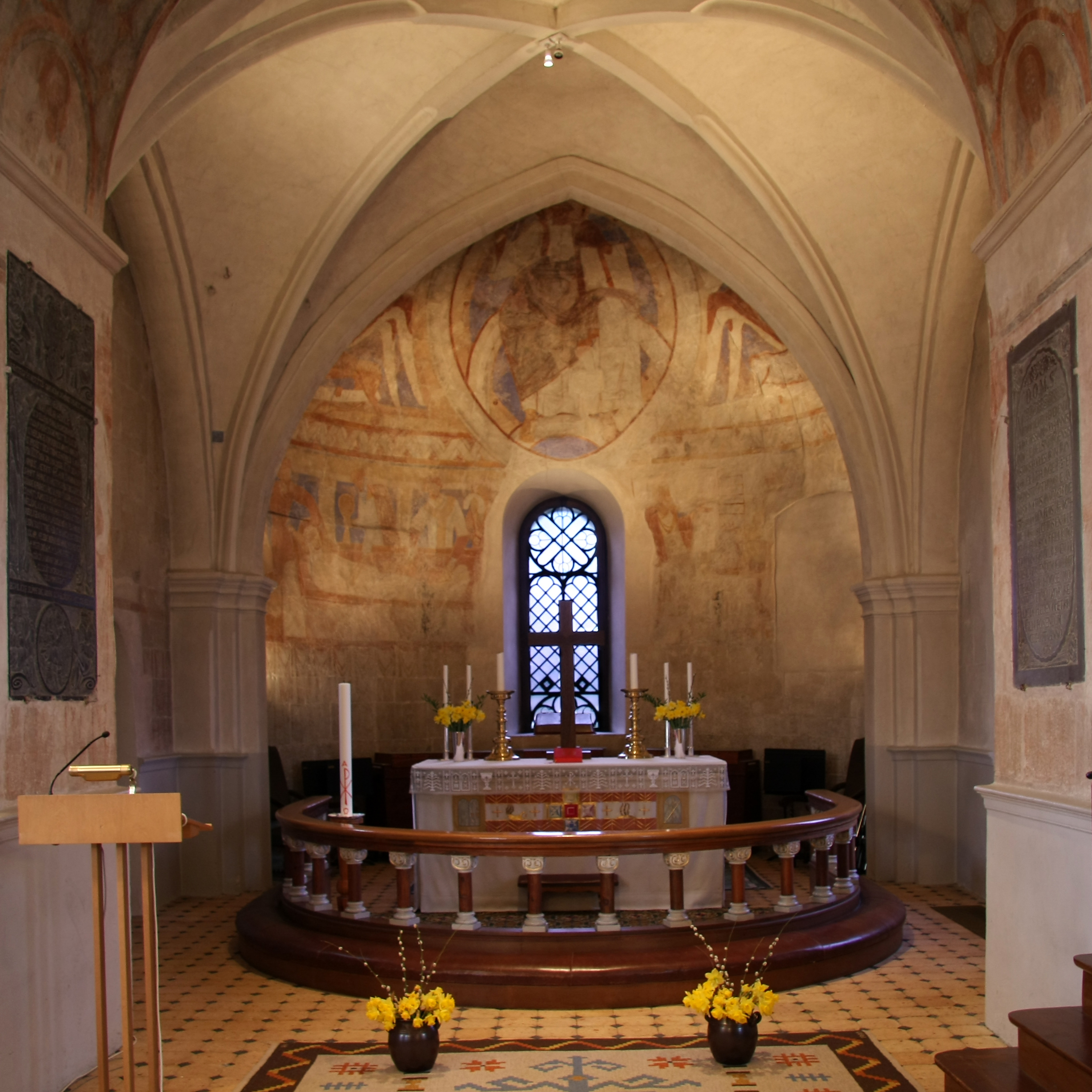
Early medieval paintings in the apse

The church dates from the first half of the 12th century. Originally it consisted of a broad, western tower, a nave, a chancel and an apse. In the 15th century, an earlier ceiling was replaced with vaults. Further changes was made after the end of the Middle Ages. In 1759, the upper part of the tower was rebuilt and slightly later the church was enlarged towards the north. In 1872, a southern transept arm was also added. A renovation was carried out in 1916–1918 by Theodor Wåhlin.

== Murals and furnishings ==
The apse of the church is decorated with medieval paintings. These date from the construction period of the church and were probably made by an artist from Lombardy, who may have come to Scania to work at the construction site of Lund Cathedral. The murals depict Christ in Majesty, Cain and Abel and a row of saints. There is also a scene which has been interpreted as the martyrdom of Saint Vincent (a popularly venerated saint in Scania at the time) or the burial of Saint Stephen. These paintings are some of the earliest church murals in Sweden.

The baptismal font of the church is probably also from the construction period (12th century). Of later date is the altarpiece, which was installed in 1636. Its lower part is decorated with a depiction of the crucifixion, while the upper part shows the resurrection of Christ. A cross made in 1936 by Anders Olson is displayed on the east wall of the north transept. The pulpit is from 1643.
