= Andrzej Stanaszek =

Polish powerlifter

Personal information
- Born: 1971 (age 54–55)
- Height: 1.22 m (4 ft 0 in)

Sport
- Sport: Powerlifting
Medal record
Representing Poland
IPF Men's World Championships
Gold medal – first place	1993 Jönköping	52 kg
Gold medal – first place	1994 Johannesburg	52 kg
Gold medal – first place	1995 Pori	52 kg
Gold medal – first place	1996 Salzburg	52 kg
Gold medal – first place	1997 Prague	52 kg
Gold medal – first place	1998 Cherkasy	52 kg
Gold medal – first place	1999 Trento	52 kg
Gold medal – first place	2000 Akita	52 kg
Silver medal – second place	2002 Trenčín	52 kg
Silver medal – second place	2003 Vejle	52 kg
Bronze medal – third place	2001 Sotkamo	52 kg
IPF Men's European Championships
Gold medal – first place	1993 Wemding	52 kg
Gold medal – first place	1995 Moscow	52 kg
Gold medal – first place	1996 Siófok	52 kg
Gold medal – first place	1997 Birmingham	52 kg
Gold medal – first place	1998 Sotkamo	52 kg
Gold medal – first place	2000 Riesa	52 kg
Gold medal – first place	2001 Syktyvkar	52 kg
Gold medal – first place	2002 Eskilstuna	52 kg
Silver medal – second place	1994 Piteå	52 kg
Silver medal – second place	2003 Sofia	52 kg
Bronze medal – third place	1992 Horsens	52 kg
IPF World Bench Press Championships
Gold medal – first place	1990 Rüsselsheim am Main	52 kg
Gold medal – first place	1991 Rüsselsheim am Main	52 kg
Gold medal – first place	1992 Kaohsiung	52 kg
Gold medal – first place	1993 Budapest	52 kg
Gold medal – first place	1994 Järvenpää	52 kg
Gold medal – first place	1995 Frýdek-Místek	52 kg
Gold medal – first place	1996 Silkeborg	52 kg
Gold medal – first place	1997 Leduc	52 kg
Gold medal – first place	1998 Amberg	52 kg
Gold medal – first place	1999 Vaasa	52 kg
Gold medal – first place	2000 Frýdek-Místek	52 kg
Gold medal – first place	2003 Trenčín	52 kg
EPF European Bench Press Championships
Gold medal – first place	1995 Budapest	52 kg
Gold medal – first place	1996 Veliky Novgorod	52 kg
Gold medal – first place	1997 Gothenburg	52 kg
Gold medal – first place	1998 Trenčín	52 kg
Gold medal – first place	1999 Győr	52 kg
Gold medal – first place	2000 Kajaani	52 kg
Gold medal – first place	2001 Jūrmala	52 kg
Gold medal – first place	2002 Nymburk	52 kg

Andrzej Stanaszek (born 1971) is a Polish powerlifter. Stanaszek has won 8 gold medals at the World Championships and 8 gold medals at the European Championships in the IPF. He was also a successful bench press athlete. In this event he won 12 World and 8 European titles.

Stanaszek is only 1.22 metres tall.
