= Mārtiņš Krūze =

Latvian powerlifter

Personal information
- Born: 1988 (age 37–38)

Sport
- Sport: Powerlifting
Medal record
Representing Latvia
Classic Men's World Championships
Silver medal – second place	2013 Suzdal	120+ kg
Bronze medal – third place	2014 Potchefstroom	120+ kg
Classic Men's European Championships
Gold medal – first place	2015 Plzeň	120+ kg
Gold medal – first place	2016 Tartu	120+ kg
Gold medal – first place	2017 Thisted	120+ kg

Mārtiņš Krūze (born in 1988) is a Latvian powerlifter. Krūze has won two medals (one silver and one bronze) at the world classic championships and three gold medals at the European classic (raw) championships in the IPF.

In 2016, Krūze became the first European to win the Classic Men's World Championships in heavyweight category 120+ kg in Texas, United States.

In 2017, Krūze became a European champion in the super heavyweight category of 120+ kg in Thisted, Denmark.
