= Cenk Koçak =

Turkish powerlifter (born 1996)

Personal information
- Born: 25 July 1996 (age 29) Turkey
- Height: 1.90 m (6 ft 3 in)
- Weight: 149.9 kg (330 lb)

Sport
- Sport: Powerlifting
Medal record
Men's powerlifting
Representing Turkey
IPF World Classic Championships
Silver medal – second place	2025 Chemnitz	120+ kg
Bronze medal – third place	2023 Valletta	120+ kg
Bronze medal – third place	2022 Sun City	120+ kg
Bronze medal – third place	2021 Halmstad	120+ kg
EPF European Classic Championships
Silver medal – second place	2025 Málaga	120+ kg
Silver medal – second place	2023 Tartu	120+ kg
Gold medal – first place	2022 Skierniewice	120+ kg
IPF Junior World Classic Championships
Gold medal – first place	2019 Helsingborg	-120 kg

Cenk Koçak (born 25 July 1996) is a Turkish classic powerlifter, who competes in the 120+ kg division.

== Personal life ==
Cenk Koçak was born on 25 July 1996. He studied sport science at Lokman Hekim University in Ankara. Koçak is 1.90 m (6 ft 3 in) tall, and weighs 130 kg (290 lb).

== Career ==
Koçak started his powerlifting career in 2013, and has been the champion for nine consecutive years since he participated in the Turkish Powerlifting Championships.

In 2019, he made his international debut in Helsingborg, Sweden, and captured the gold medal in the junior -120 kg event, totaling 892.5 kg. He also set a new world junior record.

Koçak won the bronze medal in the 120+ kg event at the Classic Powerlifting World Championships in 2021 Halmstad, Sweden, 2022 Sun City, South Africa and 2023 Valletta, Malta.

He won the gold medal in the 120+ kg event with 980 kg in total at the 2022 European Classic Powerliftimng Championships in Skierniewice, Poland.

In 2023, he took the silver medal in the 120+ kg event at the European Open Classic Powerlifting Championships in Tartu, Estonia, and set a new European record with 400.5 kg in deadlift.

In the 120+ kg category of the 2025 European Open Classic Powerlifting Championships in Málaga, Spain, he took the bronze medal in the bench press event with 245 kg, the gold medal in the deadlift with 370 kg and the silver medal with 975 kg in total.
