= Panagiotis Tarinidis =

French powerlifter

Personal information
- Born: 15 October 1994 (age 31)

Sport
- Sport: Powerlifting
Medal record
Representing France
Classic Men's World Championships
5th	2019 Helsingborg	66 kg
Gold medal – first place	2021 Halmstad	66 kg
5th	2022 Sun City	66 kg
Gold medal – first place	2023 Valletta	66 kg
Bronze medal – third place	2024 Druskininkai	66 kg
Classic Men's European Championships
Silver medal – second place	2018 Kaunas	66 kg
Gold medal – first place	2021 Vasteras	66 kg
DSQ	2022 Skierniewice	66 kg
Gold medal – first place	2023 Tartu	66 kg
SBD Sheffield Powerlifting Championships
5th	2024 Sheffield	Absolute
10th	2025 Sheffield	Absolute

Panagiotis Tarinidis (born 15 October 1994) is a French powerlifter competing in the raw 74 kilogram category. Tarinidis is two time world champion and two time European champion in the raw 66 kilogram category.

At the 2023 International Powerlifting Federation (IPF) World Classic Powerlifting Championships, Tarinidis scored his second career IPF Open World title by squatting 247.5 kg, and completing an all-time raw bench press of 172.5 kg, finishing the day with a deadlift of 285 kg. In June of the same year, Tarinidis became champion at the 2023 IPF World Classic Open Powerlifting Championships.

His personal bests in raw powerlifting competition is a 277.5 kg squat, a 187.5 kg bench press and a 290 kg deadlift.
