= Emil Norling =

Swedish powerlifter

Personal information
- Born: 21 January 1996 (age 30)

Sport
- Sport: Powerlifting
Medal record
Men's powerlifting
Representing Sweden
World Games
Bronze medal – third place	2025 Chengdu	Heavyweight classic
Classic Men's World Championships
Gold medal – first place	2022 Sun City	105 kg
Silver medal – second place	2021 Halmstad	105 kg
Silver medal – second place	2023 St. Julian's	105 kg
Classic Men's European Championships
Gold medal – first place	2019 Kaunas	105 kg
Gold medal – first place	2021 Vasteras	105 kg
Gold medal – first place	2022 Skierniewice	105 kg
Gold medal – first place	2023 Tartu	105 kg
Gold medal – first place	2024 Velika Gorica	105 kg
Gold medal – first place	2026 St Julians	105 kg

Emil Norling (born 21 January 1996) is a Swedish powerlifter. Norling has won one gold and two silver medals at the world classic championships and 6 gold medals at the European classic (raw) championships in the IPF. Norling became the first Swede to earn first place in all three weights, becoming International Powerlifting Federation champion of the 2019 Junior World Classic Powerlifting Championships.
