= Powerlifting at the 2022 World Games – Men's lightweight =

Powerlifting - Men's lightweight at the 2022 World Games
- Venue: Birmingham Jefferson Convention Complex, Birmingham, United States
- Dates: 8 July 2022
- Competitors: 11 from 7 nations

Medalists
gold medal	Yusuke Satake	Japan
silver medal	Hsieh Tsung-ting	Chinese Taipei
bronze medal	Hassan El Belghiti	France

The men's lightweight competition in powerlifting at the 2022 World Games took place on 8 July 2022 at the Birmingham Jefferson Convention Complex in Birmingham, United States.

== Competition format ==
A total of 11 athletes entered the competition, combining the 59 and 66 kilogram weight class. Each athlete had 3 attempts in each of 3 events: squat, bench press and deadlift. The athlete with the biggest score in Wilks points is the winner.

== Results ==
Rank	Athlete	Nation	Squat			Bench press			Deadlift			Total weight	Total points
Rank	Athlete	Nation	1	2	3	1	2	3	1	2	3	Total weight	Total points
1st place, gold medalist(s)	Yusuke Satake	Japan	300.0	~~310.0~~	310.0	~~205.0~~	205.0	210.0	250.0	260.0	265.0	785.0	105.49
2nd place, silver medalist(s)	Tsung-Ting Hsieh	Chinese Taipei	270.0	~~280.0~~	~~280.0~~	~~210.0~~	210.0	215.0	280.0	290.0	~~295.0~~	775.0	105.30
3rd place, bronze medalist(s)	Hassan El Belghiti	France	285.0	~~292.5~~	~~292.5~~	165.0	~~170.0~~	~~170.0~~	300.0	312.5	315.0	765.0	103.36
4	Franklin León	Ecuador	270.0	280.0	290.0	~~170.0~~	170.0	180.0	230.0	240.0	250.0	720.0	103.28
5	Eudson Lima	Brazil	255.0	~~265.0~~	272.5	167.5	172.5	~~182.5~~	265.0	275.0	~~317.5~~	720.0	97.83
6	Eric Oishi	Brazil	~~275.0~~	~~275.0~~	275.0	170.0	177.5	~~187.5~~	245.0	255.0	~~315.0~~	707.5	95.23
7	Fernando Soria	Ecuador	250.0	265.0	270.0	160.0	~~167.5~~	~~167.5~~	225.0	235.0	240.0	670.0	90.04
8	Paweł Ośmiałowski	Poland	220.0	230.0	235.0	140.0	150.0	~~160.0~~	200.0	210.0	217.5	602.5	86.48
9	Jacopo Santangelo	Italy	225.0	~~235.0~~	~~242.5~~	125.0	~~130.0~~	~~130.0~~	215.0	230.0	~~237.5~~	580.0	84.55
	Lin Yi-chun	Chinese Taipei	270.0	280.0	~~285.0~~	~~185.0~~	~~185.0~~	~~185.0~~	-	-	-	DSQ	
	Mariusz Grotkowski	Poland	~~280.0~~	~~280.0~~	~~280.0~~	195.0	205.0	215.0	245.0	260.0	~~270.0~~	DSQ	
