= Siim Rast =

Estonian powerlifter

Personal information
- Nationality: Estonian
- Born: 28 August 1988 (age 37) Jõgeva, then part of Estonian SSR, Soviet Union

Sport
- Country: Estonia
- Sport: Powerlifting
Medal record
Representing Estonia
Classic Men's World Championships
Bronze medal – third place	2018 Calgary	120+ kg
Silver medal – second place	2019 Helsingborg	120+ kg
Classic Men's European Championships
Gold medal – first place	2018 Kaunas	120+ kg
Gold medal – first place	2019 Kaunas	120+ kg
Silver medal – second place	2016 Tartu	120+ kg
Silver medal – second place	2017 Thisted	120+ kg

Siim Rast (born 28 August 1988) is an Estonian classic powerlifter. Rast is two time European champion in 120+ kg category. He also won one silver and one bronze medal at the World classic (raw) championships in the IPF.

== Career ==
On 17 June 2018, Rast was awarded bronze medal at the Classic Men's World Championships in Calgary, Canada. He also won silver medal at the 2019 Classic Men's World Championships in 120+ kg weight category which was held at Helsingborg, Sweden. Rust got into seventh place at the 2023 European Powerlifting Championships in Tartu, Estonia.
