= Temur Samkharadze =

Georgian powerlifter (born 2001)

Personal information
- Born: 11 January 2001 (age 25)

Sport
- Sport: Powerlifting
Medal record
Representing Georgia
World Games
Gold medal – first place	2025 Chengdu	Super heavyweight classic
IPF World Classic Powerlifting Championships
Silver medal – second place	2023 Valletta	120+ kg
Silver medal – second place	2024 Druskininkai	120+ kg
5th	2025 Chemnitz	120+ kg
4th	2026 Druskininkai	120+ kg
EPF World Classic Powerlifting Championships
Gold medal – first place	2023 Tartu	120+ kg
Gold medal – first place	2024 Velika Gorica	120+ kg
IPF World Junior Classic Powerlifting Championships
Gold medal – first place	2021 Stockholm	120+ kg
Gold medal – first place	2022 Istanbul	120+ kg
Gold medal – first place	2023 Cluj Napoca	120+ kg
EPF World Junior Classic Powerlifting Championships
Gold medal – first place	2021 Vasteras	120+ kg
Gold medal – first place	2022 Skierniewice	120+ kg
Gold medal – first place	2023 Budapest	120+ kg
IPF Euro Muscle Show
Gold medal – first place	2024 Amsterdam	Absolute

Temur Samkharadze (born 11 January 2001) is a Georgian powerlifter competing in the 120+ kilogram weight class. He won a gold medal at the 2025 World Games in Chengdu, China. He is also a three-time IPF junior world champion and a two-time silver medalist in the open category. He has also won two gold medals at the EPF European classic open championships and three gold medals in the European classic junior championships.

On 13 July 2024, he broke the IPF raw deadlift world record with 410.5 kg (905 lb) at IPF Euro Muscle Show, Amsterdam. On 8 September 2024 at IPF Sub Junior and Junior Championships in Malta, he increased the record to 411 kg (906 lb).
