= Eddie Berglund =

Swedish powerlifter (born 1995)

Personal information
- Born: 1995 (age 30–31)

Sport
- Sport: Powerlifting
Medal record
Representing Sweden
Classic Men's World Championships
Gold medal – first place	2022 Sun City	66 kg
Bronze medal – third place	2021 Halmstad	66 kg
Classic Men's European Championships
Gold medal – first place	2018 Kaunas	66 kg
Gold medal – first place	2019 Kaunas	66 kg
Gold medal – first place	2022 Skierniewice	74 kg
Silver medal – second place	2021 Vasteras	66 kg

Eddie Berglund (born in 1995) is a Swedish powerlifter. Berglund has won gold medal at the 2022 world classic championships and 3 gold medals at the European classic (raw) championships in the IPF.

Eddie Berglund scored an IPF raw world record at the 2022 IPF World Classic Championships in Sun City, South Africa, and in December of the same year became a gold medalist in 74 kg class at the European Classic Powerlifting Championships in Skierniewice, Poland. At the 2022 World Classic Powerlifting Championships, Berglund took silver in 250 kg squat, gold in 240 kg deadlift, and bronze in 685 kg, respectively.
