= Andy Kerr (weightlifter) =

English weightlifter

Personal information
- Nationality: English
Medal record
weightlifting
Representing England
Commonwealth Games
Silver medal – second place	1974 Christchurch	Super Heavyweight +100kg

Andy Kerr is a male retired weightlifter and powerlifter who competed for England. He was the first British lifter to clean and jerk 200kg. He held the British Bench Press and Dead Lift records at Superheavyweight until the change of weight classes in 2011.

== Weightlifting career ==
Kerr represented England and won a silver medal in the Super Heavyweight +100 kg class, at the 1974 British Commonwealth Games in Christchurch, New Zealand.

Kerr turned to Powerlifting after the end of his Weightlifting career. He was European Champion five times in the 1980s.
