= Vinslöv =

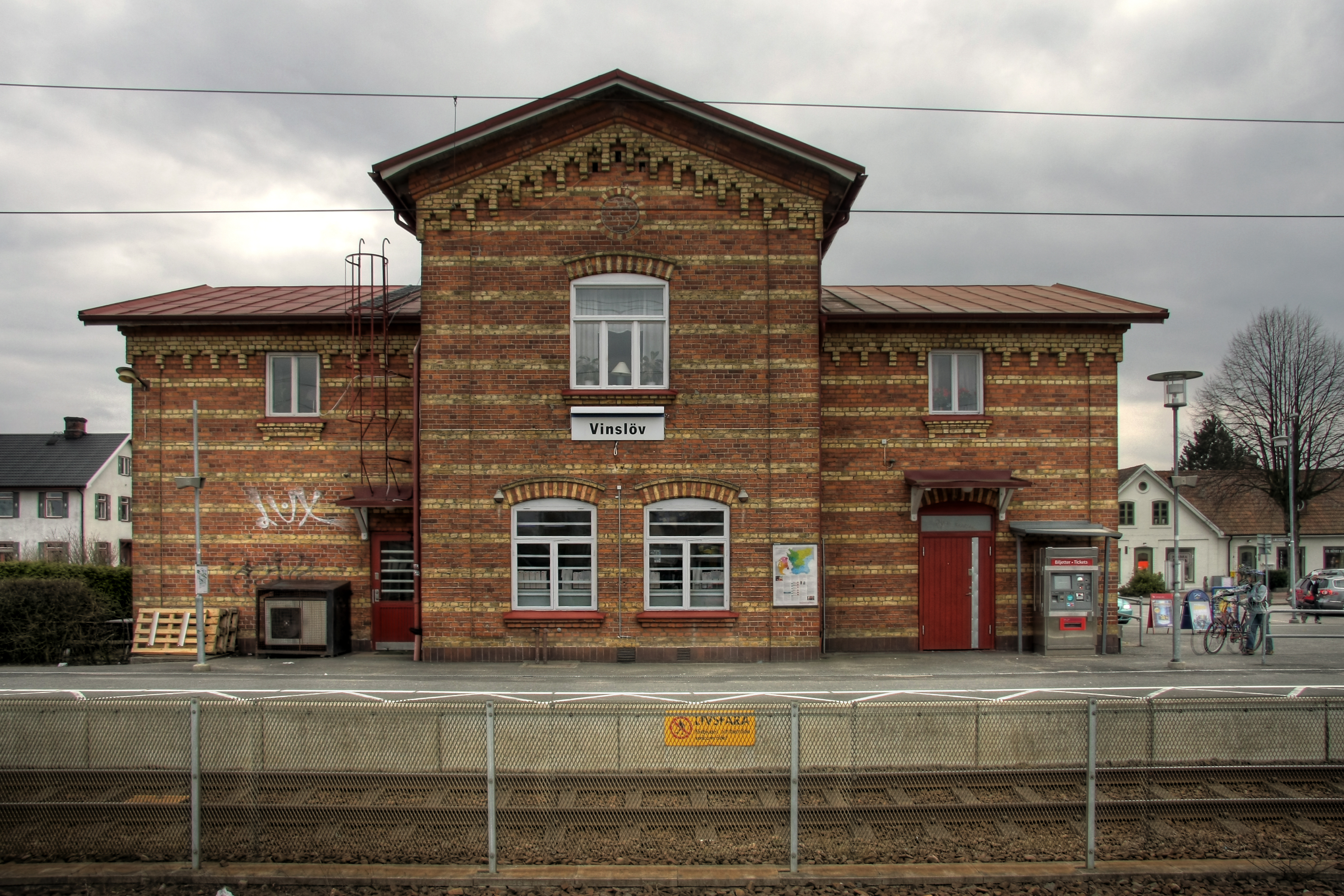
- Vinslöv train station

- Location within Skåne Location within Sweden
- Coordinates: 56°06′N 13°55′E
- Country: Sweden
- Province: Scania
- County: Scania County
- Municipality: Hässleholm Municipality

Area
  - Total: 4.16 km^{2} (1.61 sq mi)

Population (31 December 2010)
  - Total: 3,985
  - Density: 959/km^{2} (2,480/sq mi)
- Time zone: UTC+1 (CET)
  - Summer (DST): UTC+2 (CEST)

Vinslöv (Swedish pronunciation: [ˈvɪ̌nːslœv]) is a locality situated in Hässleholm Municipality, Scania County, Sweden with 3,984 inhabitants in 2010.

Vinslöv Church is a medieval church which contains some of the earliest church murals in Sweden. In 1999, a documentary film portraying some of the town's inhabitants was produced. The documentary was called Plötsligt i Vinslöv (All of a sudden in Vinslöv).
