= Dean Bowring =

English powerlifter

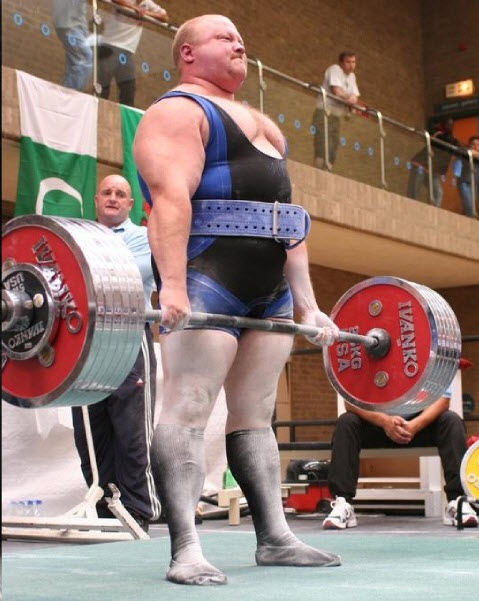
- Bowring deadlifting in August 2005

Personal information
- Born: Portsmouth, England

Sport
- Sport: Powerlifting
- Weight class: 120 kg (265 lb)

Dean Bowring is an English silver medalist powerlifter. In 2009, he won the Indian IPF World Championships at the super-heavyweight category after he lifted a total of 880 kg (1,940 lb) at the GBPF South Midlands in Southampton. He has been outspoken against the use of performance-enhancing drugs in powerlifting.

== See also ==
- List of world championships medalists in powerlifting (men)
- Powerlifting at the World Games
