= André Aldenhov =

Swedish weightlifter

Personal information
- Nationality: Swedish
- Born: 26 September 1971 (age 53); Trelleborg, Sweden

Sport
- Sport: Weightlifting

André Aldenhov (born 26 September 1971) is a Swedish weightlifter. He competed in the men's lightweight event at the 1996 Summer Olympics.
