= Hassan El Belghiti =

French powerlifter

Personal information
- Born: 14 February 1975 (age 51) Le Puy-en-Velay, Haute-Loire, France

Sport
- Sport: Powerlifting
Medal record
Representing France
World Games
| Silver medal – second place | 2017 Wrocław | Lightweight |
| Bronze medal – third place | 2009 Kaohsiung | Lightweight |
| Bronze medal – third place | 2022 Birmingham | Lightweight |
| Bronze medal – third place | 2025 Chengdu | Lightweight equipped |
IPF Classic World Championships
| Silver medal – second place | 2014 Potchefstroom | 74 kg |
| Silver medal – second place | 2015 Salo | 74 kg |
IPF Equipped World Championships
| Gold medal – first place | 2008 St. John's | 67.5 kg |
| Silver medal – second place | 2007 Solden | 67.5 kg |
| Silver medal – second place | 2009 New Delhi | 67.5 kg |
| Silver medal – second place | 2011 Plzeň | 66 kg |
| Silver medal – second place | 2012 Aguadilla | 66 kg |
| Silver medal – second place | 2017 Plzeň | 66 kg |
| Silver medal – second place | 2022 Viborg | 66 kg |
| Bronze medal – third place | 1999 Trento | 67.5 kg |
| Bronze medal – third place | 2019 Dubai | 66 kg |
| Bronze medal – third place | 2021 Stavanger | 66 kg |
EPF Classic European Championships
| Silver medal – second place | 2015 Plzeň | 74 kg |
EPF Equipped European Championships
| Gold medal – first place | 2007 Kościan | 67.5 kg |
| Gold medal – first place | 2008 Frýdek-Místek | 67.5 kg |
| Gold medal – first place | 2010 Köping | 67.5 kg |
| Gold medal – first place | 2011 Plzeň | 66 kg |
| Gold medal – first place | 2018 Plzeň | 66 kg |
| Gold medal – first place | 2021 Plzeň | 66 kg |
| Gold medal – first place | 2022 Plzeň | 66 kg |
| Gold medal – first place | 2023 Thisted | 66 kg |
| Silver medal – second place | 1999 Pułtusk | 67.5 kg |
| Silver medal – second place | 2012 Mariupol | 66 kg |
| Silver medal – second place | 2013 Plzeň | 74 kg |
| Silver medal – second place | 2019 Plzeň | 66 kg |
| Bronze medal – third place | 2000 Riesa | 67.5 kg |
| Bronze medal – third place | 2004 Nymburk | 67.5 kg |
| Bronze medal – third place | 2005 Hamm | 67.5 kg |
| Bronze medal – third place | 2016 Plzeň | 74 kg |
| Bronze medal – third place | 2017 Málaga | 66 kg |

Hassan El Belghiti (born 14 February 1975) is a French powerlifter. El Belghiti is one time world champion and eight times European champion. In total he won 30 medals of any colour at both world & European championships (classic & equipped). He also took part in 5 editions of The World Games winning silver in 2017 and two bronzes in 2009 and 2022.

In 2016, Hassan deadlifted weight 4.8 times his own at the European Equipped Powerlifting Championships in Plzeň, Czech Republic.

The same year, Belghiti was caught on camera pulling weight of 297.5 kg which was 4.5 times his bodyweight.
