= Johnny Wahlqvist =

Swedish powerlifter

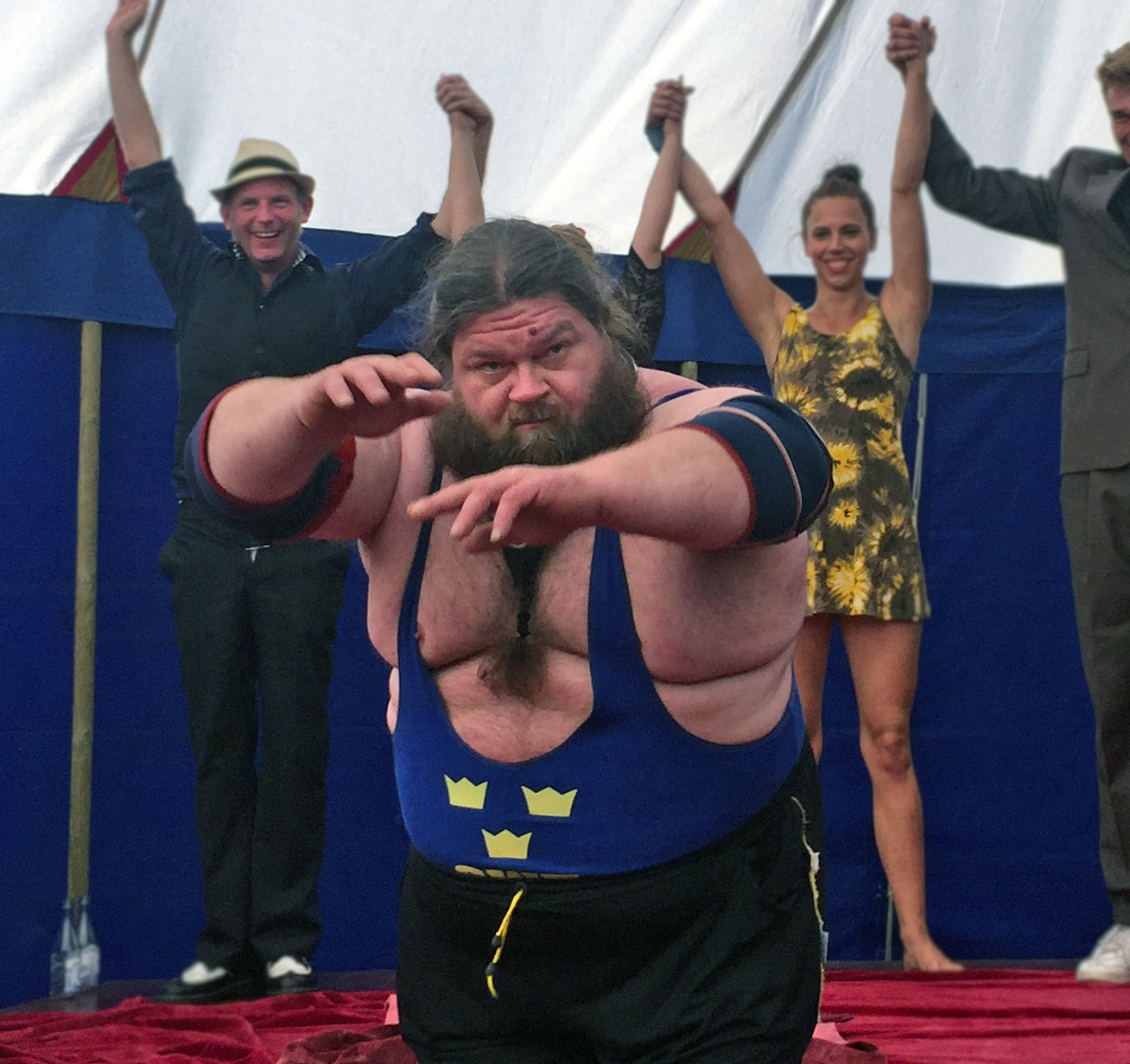
Johnny Wahlqvist, was a Swedish powerlifter.

Johnny Wahlqvist (c. 1973 in Trelleborg – 30 January 2017) was a Swedish powerlifter. One of Sweden's most successful champions, specifically in bench press, he competed and won in the national, European, and world championships.

He appeared in several television programs, namely Talang Sverige and Boston Tea Party.

He died at the age of 43 in the cardiac intensive care unit in Ystad, following a heart failure.

== Peak measurements ==
- Height: 69 inches
- Weight: 400 pounds in 2012
- Chest: 72½ inches at 400 pounds bodyweight.
- Biceps (Flexed): 26 inch at 400 pounds bodyweight.
- Shoulder circumference: 84 inches at 400 pounds bodyweight.
