= Mats Lindqvist =

Swedish weightlifter

Personal information
- Nationality: Swedish
- Born: 9 July 1963 (age 61); Helsingborg, Sweden

Sport
- Sport: Weightlifting

Mats Lindqvist (born 9 July 1963) is a Swedish weightlifter. He competed at the 1988 Summer Olympics and the 1992 Summer Olympics.
