= Dariusz Wszoła =

Polish powerlifter (born 1978)

Personal information
- Born: 2 June 1978 (age 48) Legnica, Poland

Sport
- Sport: Powerlifting
Medal record
Representing Poland
World Games
Bronze medal – third place	2005 Duisburg	Lightweight
Classic Men's World Championships
Gold medal – first place	2013 Suzdal	59 kg
Silver medal – second place	2012 Stockholm	59 kg
Silver medal – second place	2014 Potchefstroom	59 kg
Bronze medal – third place	2015 Salo	59 kg
Bronze medal – third place	2016 Killeen	59 kg
Bronze medal – third place	2017 Minsk	59 kg
Equipped Men's World Championships
Gold medal – first place	2006 Stavanger	52 kg
Gold medal – first place	2008 St. John's	56 kg
Silver medal – second place	2010 Potchefstroom	56 kg
Bronze medal – third place	2009 New Delhi	56 kg
Bronze medal – third place	2012 Aguadilla	59 kg
Classic Men's European Championships
Gold medal – first place	2015 Plzeň	59 kg
Gold medal – first place	2017 Thisted	59 kg
Gold medal – first place	2018 Kaunas	59 kg
Gold medal – first place	2019 Kaunas	59 kg
Silver medal – second place	2016 Tartu	59 kg
Silver medal – second place	2022 Skierniewice	59 kg
Bronze medal – third place	2023 Tartu	59 kg
Bronze medal – third place	2024 Velika Gorica	59 kg
Equipped Men's European Championships
Gold medal – first place	2006 Prostějov	52 kg
Gold medal – first place	2007 Kościan	56 kg
Gold medal – first place	2008 Frýdek-Místek	56 kg
Gold medal – first place	2009 Ylitornio	56 kg
Gold medal – first place	2010 Köping	56 kg
Gold medal – first place	2011 Plzeň	59 kg
Gold medal – first place	2016 Plzeň	59 kg
Gold medal – first place	2022 Plzeň	59 kg
Silver medal – second place	2000 Riesa	52 kg
Silver medal – second place	2004 Nymburk	52 kg
Silver medal – second place	2005 Hamm	56 kg
Silver medal – second place	2015 Chemnitz	59 kg
Silver medal – second place	2017 Málaga	59 kg
Silver medal – second place	2018 Plzeň	59 kg
Bronze medal – third place	1999 Pułtusk	52 kg
Bronze medal – third place	2001 Syktyvkar	52 kg
Bronze medal – third place	2002 Eskilstuna	52 kg
Bronze medal – third place	2012 Mariupol	59 kg
Bronze medal – third place	2019 Plzeň	59 kg

Dariusz Wszoła (born 2 June 1978) is a Polish powerlifter. Wszoła has won 3 gold medals at the world championships (both classic & equipped) and 12 gold medals at the European championships in the IPF. In total he won 38 medals of any colour at classic or equipped powerlifting senior championships. In addition he has got a plenty of medals from World and European Bench Press Championships. He also took part in 4 editions of the World Games and won bronze medal at the 2005 World Games.

== Career ==
In 2016, Wszoła won gold medal at the European Powerlifting Championships in Plzeň, Czech Republic after totaling 620 kg (combined of 240 kg in squats, 170 kg in bench press and 210 kg in deadlift). In 2019, Wszoła became a gold medalist at the European Classic Powerlifting Championships after totaling 560 kg, with Wszoła also winning two additional gold medals for the squat and bench press.
