= Paul Anderson (weightlifter) =

American weightlifter (1932–1994)

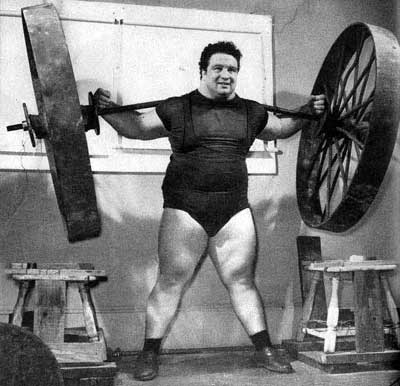

Personal information
- Born: October 17, 1932 Toccoa, Georgia, U.S.
- Died: August 15, 1994 (aged 61) Vidalia, Georgia, U.S.
- Height: 5 ft 9.5 in (177 cm)
- Weight: 304–380 lb (138–172 kg)
- Spouse: Glenda Garland (m. 1959)

Sport
- Sport: Olympic weightlifting, strongman, powerlifting
Medal record
Men's weightlifting
Representing the United States
Olympic Games
Gold medal – first place	1956 Melbourne	+90 kg
World Championships
Gold medal – first place	1955 Munich	+90 kg
U.S. National Weightlifting Championships
1st	1955	+90kg
1st	1956	+90kg

Paul Edward Anderson (October 17, 1932 – August 15, 1994) was an American weightlifter, professional wrestler, powerlifter and strongman. During the 1950s, he was an Olympic gold medalist, a world champion, and a two-time national Olympic weightlifting champion.

Anderson contributed significantly to the development of competitive powerlifting in the 1960s. Due to his many world records and outstanding feats of strength specially for his time, he has often been called "the strongest man who ever lived".

== Early life ==
Anderson was born in Toccoa, Georgia, the only son of Ethel Bennett and Robert Anderson. As a teenager, he began his early weight training on his own in his family's backyard to increase his size and strength so that he would be able to play on the Toccoa High School football team, where he earned a position as first-team blocking back. He used special homemade weights that his father created out of concrete poured into a wooden form. Anderson attended Furman University on a football scholarship, where he began lifting weights. He later moved to Elizabethton, Tennessee, with his parents, where he met weightlifter Bob Peoples, who would greatly influence him in squat training and introduce him into weightlifting circles.

== Early amateur career ==
Like his contemporary and future rival Doug Hepburn, Anderson quickly identified the squat as the most important exercise for developing strength. On December 27, 1952, he set a new world record of 660.5 lb (299.6 kg) at the Chattanooga and Tennessee Weightlifting Championships, done at a bodyweight of 285 lbs (129.3 kg). The following year, 20 year-old Anderson extended his own record to 714.25 lb (324 kg) on May 30 and again to 762.25 lb (345.8 kg) on July 25, 1953, in Norfolk, Virginia.

Anderson's early record in Olympic Weightlifting was similarly impressive: from an 800 lb (362.9 kg) three lift (clean and press, snatch, clean and jerk) total in Chattanooga, he progressed to 875 lb (396.9 kg) on March 21, 1953, and again to 940 lbs (426.4 kg) at the Junior National Championships in Cleveland, Ohio on May 17. Although handed a rare defeat at the contest by Canadian champion Doug Hepburn, Anderson set a new Junior National record in the clean and jerk with 382 lb (173.3 kg). These lifts were done under much stricter rules than today's weightlifting, where the bar was not permitted to come into contact with the athlete's body at any point during the snatch or clean.

Recovering from a wrist injury in September 1953, Anderson lifted an unofficial world record 1,076 lb (488 kg) total at the Bob Hoffman Birthday show on November 7, and in early 1954 increased his training best in the back squat to 820 lb (372 kg). On January 16, 1954, Anderson broke his other wrist at the Middle Atlantic Open in Philadelphia; this injury prevented him from competing again until mid-May. That month he recorded a total of 1,030 lb (467.2 kg) and looked to be on track to break the 1,100 lb (499 kg) barrier before fracturing several ribs in a car accident. Nonetheless, Anderson finished the 1954 season with a 1,070 lb (485.4 kg) total at the All Dixie Championships on December 11, nearly matching his personal best.

Despite the setbacks in 1954, 1955 proved to be another breakout year for Anderson. Now weighing over 340 lb (154 kg), Anderson finally crossed the 1,100 lb mark on February 12, 1955. On April 15, he became the first person to clean and press more than 400 lb (181.4 kg), with a lift of 402 lb (182.3 kg), along with a snatch of 315 lb (142.9 kg) and clean and jerk of 425.25 (192.9 kg) for a total of 1,142.25 lb (518.1 kg). Shortly afterward on April 23, Anderson extended his press record to 403 lb (182.8 kg), snatched 300 lb (136.1 kg), and clean and jerked 434 lb (196.9 kg) for a total of 1,137 lb (515.7 kg). Heading into the 1955 Senior Nationals in Cleveland, Ohio, the 22 year-old Anderson further increased his personal best in the back squat to 910 lb (412.8 kg); that year he also bench pressed 450 lb (204.1 kg) for 3 reps in a special exhibition at the Frye Institute in Chattanooga. At the Senior Nationals Anderson set new American records in the clean and jerk (436.5 lb, 198 kg) and total (1,145 lb, 519.4 kg), exceeding Norbert Schemansky's previous American record total by 20 pounds.

== International competition ==
On June 7, 1955, at the height of the Cold War, Anderson, together with Tommy Kono, Chuck Vinci, Joe Pitman, Stan Stanczyk, and Dave Sheppard, traveled to the Soviet Union, where weightlifting was a popular sport, for a series of 3 invitational competitions against the Soviet team. In an American newsreel the narrator, Bud Palmer, commented as follows: "Then, up to the bar stepped a great ball of a man, Paul Anderson." Palmer said, "The Russians snickered as Anderson gripped the bar, which was set at 402.5 lb (182.6 kg), an unheard-of lift. But their snickers quickly changed to awe and all-out cheers as up went the bar and Anderson lifted the heaviest weight overhead of any human in history." "We rarely have such weights lifted," said the solemn Russian announcer as Anderson hoisted it in the two-hand press discipline. Prior to Anderson's lift, the Soviet champion, Alexey Medvedev, had matched the Olympic record of the time with a 330.3 lb (149.8 kg) press. Anderson then did a 402.5 lb (182.6 kg) press. At a time when Americans were engaged in a symbolic Cold War battle with the Soviet Union, Anderson's strength — and his singular, tank-like appearance — became a rallying cry to all. Anderson totaled 1,163.5 lb (527.8 kg) in Moscow on June 15 with a 402.5 lb press, 336 lb (152.4 kg) snatch, and 425.25 lb (192.9 kg) clean and jerk. He followed this up with another total of 1,129.5 lb (512.3 kg) in Leningrad on June 18, again easily winning his weight class.

During the 1955 World Championships in Munich, Germany, Anderson went on to establish two other world records in the press with 407.7 lb (184.9 kg) and total with 1,129.5 lb (512.3 kg) as he easily won the competition in his weight class to become world champion. Upon his return to the United States, Anderson was received by then Vice-president Richard Nixon, who thanked him for being a goodwill ambassador.

In the lead up to the 1956 Olympic Games in Melbourne, Australia, Anderson set his all-time highest total in amateur competition at the 1956 Senior Nationals, lifting 400 lb (181.4 kg) in the press, 335 lb (152 kg) in the snatch, and 440 lb (199.6 kg) in the clean and jerk, for a total of 1,175 lb (533 kg) at a bodyweight of around 330 lb (150 kg). At the games, Anderson won a gold medal in a long, tough duel with Argentine Humberto Selvetti (while suffering from a 104 °F (40 °C) fever). The two competitors were tied in the amount of weight lifted, but because Anderson, who weighed in at 137.9 kg (304 lb), was lighter than Selvetti (143.5 kg, 316 lb), Anderson was awarded the gold.

== Professional career ==
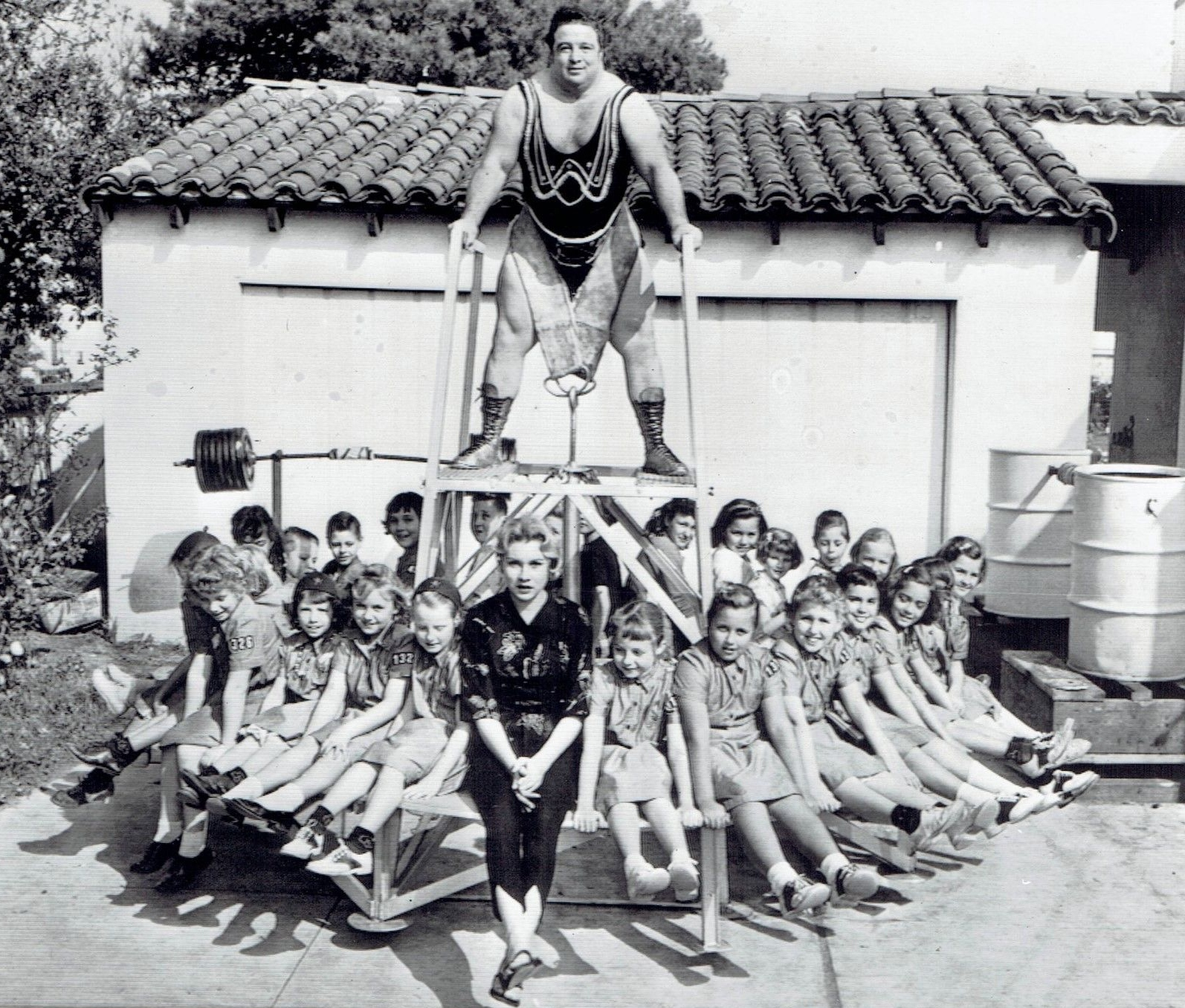
Paul Anderson performing the Carousel lift, 1957, with a weight of approximately 2,400 lbs (1,090 kg).

Although his popularity was at an all-time high after the Olympics, Anderson could not accept payment for his performances due to regulations governing athletes' amateur standing. Thus, at the age of 24 he decided to turn professional, ending his career in Olympic weightlifting.

Throughout 1957 and 1958 Anderson, despite his ineligibility to compete in weightlifting, continued pushing his strength to new heights in a series of public performances, some of which were televised. The day after the 1957 Mr. USA contest, Anderson push pressed 500 lb (226.8 kg) at Muscle Beach, California, surpassing Doug Hepburn's public record of 460 lb (208.7 kg) done at the Montreal Forum on November 21, 1954. Later, Anderson famously appeared as part of a Silver Dollar Squat challenge at the Mapes Hotel in Reno, Nevada, in which a prize of $15,000.00 was offered to anyone who could duplicate his feat of squatting a bar loaded with two coin-filled safes. Anderson's act was broadcast on The Ed Sullivan Show to an audience of more than 40 million, in which he also broke his own record in the clean and press with 415 lb (188.2 kg).

It was also around this time that Anderson reportedly performed several feats that would later become the subject of controversy. In the December 1957-January 1958 issue of Iron Man magazine, sportswriter Peary Rader reported that Anderson had, among other things, squatted 1,160 lb (526.2 kg) and bench pressed 600 lb (272.2 kg) at Muscle Beach. Subsequently, the December 1958-January 1959 issue commented on a reported backlift of 6,200 lb (c. 2800 kg), by far the greatest weight ever lifted in this movement.

In the spring of 1958 another Soviet-American weightlifting contest was organized, this time without Anderson competing. The Soviet team won, but Anderson, making an appearance as a guest lifter, created a spectacle by cleaning and pressing 424.25 lb (192.9 kg) for two repetitions, barely missing a third. By then his bodyweight had increased to 360 lb (163.2 kg).

From 1958 to 1960, Paul tried his hand in both boxing and professional wrestling. He wrestled in Chicago most notably against Bozo Brown in the International Amphitheater on November 7, 1958.

In 1961, Anderson and his wife Glenda founded the Paul Anderson Youth Home, a home for troubled youth, in Vidalia, Georgia. They both helped to build and support the home with an average of 500 speaking engagements and strength exhibitions per year—notwithstanding the congenital chronic kidney disease that eventually killed him at age 61. He would perform stunts such as hammering a nail with his bare fist and raising a table loaded with eight men onto his back.

Because of his professional status, Anderson could not compete in the 1960 Summer Olympics. There Soviet heavyweight Yury Vlasov bested the records Anderson set four years earlier. Talk began of a televised match between the two athletes and Anderson began training the Olympic lifts; at an exhibition at a children's hospital in Knoxville, Tennessee, he pressed 422.5 lb (191.6 kg), snatched 347.5 lb (157.6 kg), and clean and jerked 422.5 lb (191.6 kg) for a new personal best of 1,192.5 lb (540.9 kg). Then in the spring of 1962, he pressed 415 lb (188.2 kg) and snatched 335 lb (152 kg) in East Point, Georgia. In Dalton Anderson further went on to clean and press 415 lb (188.2 kg) for three repetitions, exceeding Vlasov's official record of 413.5 lb (187.6 kg). In the end, despite efforts on both sides to arrange the Anderson-Vlasov contest at the 1962 World Weightlifting Championships, the expected duel never took place. Throughout 1963 Anderson campaigned for reinstatement as an amateur in order to compete at the Olympics again; on March 30, 1963, in Birmingham, Alabama, he clean and pressed 440 lb (199.6 kg), snatched 350 lb (158.8 kg), and just missed a clean and jerk of 460 lb (208.7 kg). Despite being stronger than ever in the Olympic lifts, his appeal was denied by the AAU on December 6, 1963, by a vote of 14 to 12.

== Powerlifting ==
After failing to secure reinstatement as an amateur weightlifter, Anderson, while traveling to support both his youth home and the Fellowship of Christian Athletes, performed as a guest athlete at several events in the new sport of powerlifting. Often these exhibitions were done under conditions of fatigue, poor nutrition, and inconsistent training from the demands of his schedule. Despite this, Anderson performed some of the heaviest lifts of his career during this time, at a bodyweight of 360 to 380 lb (163.3 kg to 172.4 kg). Highlights included:

- Clean and press 410 lb (186 kg), squat 700 lb (317.5 kg) for seven comfortable repetitions (1964 Southwest Powerlift Championships, Dallas, Texas).
- Clean and press 420 lb (190.5 kg), squat 900 lb (408.2 kg), deadlift 710 lb (322 kg) (Silver Spring, Maryland, 1965). According to Glen McDevitt, coach of the Silver Spring Barbell Club, Anderson drove 700 miles (1,130 km) in 15 hours to arrive at the meet.
- Deadlift 750 lb (340.2 kg) and squat 929 lb (421.4 kg) (Region 3 Powerlift Championships, July 1965, Dallas Texas). The face value of these lifts was 750 lb (340.2 kg) for the deadlift, which was done first, and 905 lb (410.5 kg) for the squat. The squat weighed out to 929 lb due to the inclusion of four 100 lb plates that actually weighed 106 lb each. It is unclear if Anderson's deadlift also used these plates - if it did, the actual weight would have been 774 lb (351 kg).
- Press 400 lb (181.4 kg), bench press 500 lb (226.8 kg), squat 900 lb (408.2 kg), deadlift 700 lb (317.5 kg) (Exhibition at High Point YMCA, 1965)
- Deadlift 710 lb (322 kg), squat 825 lb (374.2 kg) (1965 Texas Power Lift Championships). Anderson participated while recovering from a bout of influenza.
- Squat 780 lb (353.8 kg), deadlift 740 lb (335.7 kg) (June 4, 1966 bodybuilding show). Done with a leg injury using uncalibrated plates that were likely heavier than face value.

In August 1965, Peary Rader speculated in Lifting News that with proper dedication Anderson could quickly reach a 2,450 lb (1,111.3 kg) 3-lift total, by way of a 1,000 lb (453.6 kg) squat, 600 lb (272.2 kg) bench press, and 850 lb (385.6 kg) deadlift. Although Anderson never achieved such a feat, even his total of 2,100 lb (952.6 kg) at the High Point YMCA using sub-maximal weights and without a proper contest prep greatly exceeded Dr. Terry Todd's official record of 1,892 lb (858.2 kg), and was done without the use of knee wraps for the squat.

== Personal life ==
In 1950, Anderson married Glenda Garland. The couple were Christians. They had one daughter, born 1966.

While competing, Anderson weighed 275–370 lb (125–168 kg) and stood between 5 feet 9.5 inches (1.77 m) and 5 feet 10.5 inches (1.79 m) tall.

== Death ==
As a child, Anderson suffered from Bright's disease (now known as chronic nephritis), a kidney disorder, and he eventually died from kidney disease on August 15, 1994, at the age of 61.

== Legacy ==
Anderson's true life testimony can be heard through the Unshackled! radio ministry. It was first broadcast as program number 2521 and later redramatized as program number 3478. Unshackled! has also produced a comic booklet telling Anderson's story, which includes breaking a brick and stopping bank robbers.

Paul Anderson Memorial Park, located at the corner of East Tugalo Street and Big A Road in Toccoa, is named for Anderson. The park features a life-size sculpture of him performing an overhead barbell lift. The sculpture was created by Jerry McKenna, renowned American sculptor.

Was once a contestant on "You Bet Your Life" with Groucho Marx. Paul and his partner answered four questions correctly, winning them $1000.

In July 2019, an episode of the History Channel show The Strongest Man in History featured Paul Anderson's story and several of his historic feats of strength.

== Personal records ==
=== Official records ===
Olympic weightlifting Done in official competition in the "no-contact" style

- Clean and press – 408.5 lb (185.3 kg) (1955 World Championships, Munich)
- Snatch – 335 lb (152.0 kg) (1956 Senior Nationals, Philadelphia)
- Clean and jerk – 440 lb (199.6 kg) (1956 Senior Nationals, Philadelphia)
- Total – 1,175 lb (533.0 kg) (C&P: 400 lb (181.4 kg), S: 335 lb (152.0 kg), C&J: 440 lb (199.6 kg)
  (1956 Senior Nationals, Philadelphia)

→ Prior to 1964 no contact between the bar and the athlete's body was permitted during the pulling phase of either the snatch or the clean. From 1964 to 1968 a "thigh brush" was allowed, and from 1969 onwards a full-contact hip bump was permitted to assist in completing the lift.

=== Unofficial records ===
Olympic weightlifting

- Clean and press – 440 lb (199.6 kg) (30 March 1963, Birmingham, Alabama)
- Snatch – 350 lb (158.8 kg) (30 March 1963, Birmingham, Alabama. Also pressed 440 lbs and just missed a 460 lb clean and jerk.)
- Clean and Jerk – 445 lb (201.8 kg) (Public record, matched on several occasions)
- Olympic Weightlifting Total – 1,192.5 lb (540.9 kg) (422.5 lb clean and press, 347.5 lb snatch, 422.5 lb clean and jerk, Knoxville, Tennessee, 1961)
- Clean and press for reps – 424.25 lb (192.4 kg) for 2 reps (Public record, close miss on 3rd rep, 17 May 1958)
- Clean and press for reps – 415 lb (188.2 kg) for 3 reps (Public record, Dalton, Georgia, 1962)
- Continental clean and jerk – 460 lb (208.7 kg) (Public record, Steve Stanczyk's strength show in Florida, 18 February 1956)
- Continental clean and press – 450 lb (204.1 kg)
- Overhead press from stands – 465 lb (210.9 kg) (Photographed during a training session)
- Push press from stands – 500 lb (226.8 kg) (Performed and photographed at Muscle Beach, California, 1957)

Powerlifting

- Squat – 929 lb (421.4 kg) raw (Region 3 Powerlift Championships, 1965)

→ According to the contest report, Paul jumped from 820 lb (371.9 kg) to 905 lb (410.5 kg), which he lifted "with no trouble at all".This weighed out to 929 lb (421.4 kg) and remained the heaviest raw squat until 1976 when Don Reinhoudt squatted 934.5 lb (423.9 kg). In 1973 Reinhoudt squatted 950 lb (430.9 kg) with only a lifting belt, but it was disallowed due to depth.

- Squat for reps – 900 lb (408.2 kg) for 5 reps raw (Public record, 1965 or 1966 exhibition at Silver Springs boys club)
- Squat for reps – 800 lb (362.9 kg) for 2 sets of 10 reps raw (Per Pat Casey, 1957)
- Bench press – 500 lb (226.8 kg) raw (Powerlifting exhibition at High Point YMCA, 1965)
- Bench press – 500 lb (226.8 kg) raw with 3 second pause (Training session with Doug Hepburn during production of "Once Upon a Horse.")
- Bench press – 575 lb (260.8 kg) raw, touch and go (Bob Hoffman et al., "Strength & Health," September 1957)
- Deadlift – 750 lb (340.2 kg) raw without straps (Region 3 Powerlift Championships, 1965)

→ After taking a warmup of 620 lb (281.2 kg), Paul lifted 680 lb (308.4 kg) before missing 720 lb (326.6 kg) due to grip. Despite this, he recovered to lift 750 lb (340.2 kg) for his final attempt.

- Four-lift Powerlifting total – 2,600 lb (1,179.3 kg) raw (High Point YMCA, 1965. 400 lb press, 500 lb bench press, 700 lb clean grip deadlift, 900 lb squat.)

→ Done with a short preparation and sub-maximal attempts.

Strongman Different sources provide different numbers on these feats.

- Oil drum squat – 1,190.5–1,230 lb (540.0–557.9 kg)

→ Partial range of motion, performed while standing in a hole dug in the ground.

- Carousel lift (hip lift) – 2,700 lb (1,224.7 kg) (performed during The Ed Sullivan Show)

=== Claims ===
Self-claims, or date, weight, and circumstances broadly uncertain:

Olympic weightlifting During training, according to Anderson himself

- Clean and press – 485 lb (220.0 kg)
- Snatch – 375 lb (170.1 kg)
- Clean and jerk – 485 lb (220.0 kg)

Powerlifting and Strongman During training, according to other fellow lifters or Anderson himself

- Squat (personal record) – 1,206.5 lb (547.3 kg) raw (Anderson claim)
- Squat for reps – 900 lb (408.2 kg) for 10 reps raw (Per John Grimek, date uncertain)
- Bench press – 627 lb (284.4 kg) raw
- Power shrug – over 1,000 lb (453.6 kg)

→ Taken from hooks attached to a specialty belt. Weight pulled from hooks 6 inches below the belt to about 6 inches above the waist

- Deadlift – 780–820 lb (353.8–371.9 kg) raw (Peary Rader wrote in Iron Man Magazine that Anderson's best raw deadlift was 780 lb.)
- Assisted deadlift (using metal hooks attached to the wrists) – "over 800" to 1,000 lb (453.6 kg)

→ 1,000 lb per Peary Rader, March 1961, and Tommy Kono, 1992. Contemporary articles reference Anderson exceeding 800 lbs (363 kg) on several occasions and Anderson himself claimed a deadlift of "well over" 800 lb in a 1989 interview with Dr. Randall Strossen. In 1968, Rader wrote that Anderson had done "more than 800 lb" using a stiff-legged technique while wearing wrist straps. David Willoughby's 1970 book "The Super Athletes" estimated that Anderson 'should have been capable' of a 1,000 lb deadlift with straps.

- Push press (off the rack) – 545–600 lb (247.2–272.2 kg) (Different sources provide different numbers. The uppermost number is claimed to have witnessed by Bob Hise, date uncertain)
- One-arm dumbbell side press – 380 lb (172.4 kg) (Claimed to have witnessed by Paul Magistratte, date uncertain)
- Silver dollar safe squat – 900–1,160 lb (408.2–526.2 kg) (performed at Mapes Hotel and Casino, Reno, Nevada)

→ Upon replicating the implement, it was estimated by The Strongest Man in History TV show that the weight might have been around 720 lb (326.6 kg).

- Back lift – 6,270 lb (2,844.0 kg)

→ Was removed from the Guinness book of world records in the late 1980s due to insufficient evidence.

== Training routines ==
The following are examples of training routines used by Anderson at various points in his life. According to Anderson's autobiography, he preferred to train at 95 percent intensity for every lift.

Olympic lifting routine, prior to April 1954:

Monday-Wednesday-Friday

- Overhead press – 320 lb (145.1 kg), several sets of 2 reps
- Dumbbell press – 135 lb (61.2 kg) per hand, multiple sets of 3 reps
- Snatch – 310 lb (140.6 kg), multiple singles
- Clean – 400 lb (181.4 kg), multiple singles
- Deadlift – 690 lb (313.0 kg), 2 sets of 3 reps, raw with metal hooks to aid grip
- Clean pull to waist height – 500 lb (226.8 kg), 4 sets of 3 reps, raw with metal hooks to aid grip
- Additionally, Paul deadlifted 700 lb (317.5 kg) for a single with mixed grip as a demonstration

Tuesday-Thursday-Saturday

- Back squat – 780 lb (353.8 kg), 1 to 3 sets of 2 reps. Paul's best single at this time was 820 lb (371.9 kg)

Occasionally

- Bench press – 410 lb (186.0 kg), 3 sets of 2 reps
- Quarter squat – 1,800 lb (816.5 kg)

Power training routine circa 1955–57. Gallagher's earlier date (1955) is disputed by Charles Poliquin, who places it after Paul turned professional following the 1956 Summer Olympics in December of that year. This dating is supported by the fact that Paul spent much of 1954 recovering from a car accident in which he suffered a hip injury and several broken ribs and Paul's own statement that he only trained the bench press regularly from 1955 to 1957 and again later in 1965.

Monday-Wednesday-Friday

- Overhead press – 300 lb (136.1 kg) × 6 reps, 370 lb (167.8 kg) × 2 reps, 390 lb (176.9 kg) × 2 reps, 400 lb (181.4 kg) × 2 reps
- Overhead press from sticking point to lockout – 500 lb (226.8 kg) × 4 reps
- Overhead press from shoulders to top of head – 500 lb (226.8 kg) × 4 reps
- Push press – 450 lb (204.1 kg) × 3 reps
- Bench press – 400 lb (181.4 kg) to 450 lb (204.1 kg), multiple sets of 6 to 8 reps

Tuesday-Thursday-Saturday

- Back squat – 600 lb (272.2 kg), 2 sets × 10 reps, 825 lb (374.2 kg) × 2 reps, 845 lb (383.3 kg) × 2 reps, 900 lb (408.2 kg) × 2 reps
- Half squat – 1,200 lb (544.3 kg) × 2 reps
- Quarter squat – 1,800 lb (816.5 kg) × 2 reps
- Deadlift – 650 lb (294.8 kg) for 4 sets of 6 to 8 reps

Finally, Jeff Everson relates Anderson's squat training routine when Anderson was in his prime during the early 1960s, at a bodyweight of approximately 370 lb (167.8 kg):

- Back squat – 600 lb (272.2 kg), 3 sets × 10 reps, 800–850 lb (362.9–385.6 kg), multiple sets of 4 to 6 reps
- Half squat – 1,200 lb (544.3 kg)
- Quarter squat – 1,500 lb (680.4 kg)

== Quotes about Anderson ==
- "I could do 310 in a standing one-arm side press with a dumbbell. Paul could do it for reps with ease."
  – Chuck Ahrens (strongman)
- "Though I never met him personally until the Strength Symposium in Florida, I saw films of him lifting in his heyday, with such absolute ease it was astonishing. Using his strength to benefit others is something that should make all powerlifters proud. What a great benefactor to mankind." – Ed Coan (powerlifter)
- "My love and respect for Paul runs deep. His ability to lift enormous weights in limited movements surpasses all. Those who attempt to discredit him shame our sport." – Jon Cole (powerlifter)
- "He's the king of strength. His backlift was unbelievable. But more amazing was his total commitment as a Christian."
  – Bill Kazmaier (powerlifter & strongman)
- "Paul was an inspiration to me. Some of his feats may never be surpassed." – Don Reinhoudt (powerlifter & strongman)
- "A lot of lifters gathered at Sydney's on Santa Monica Beach near the base of the Pier. Here, as they got pissed [drunk], their stories became more and more fantastic. One heard of deltoids like watermelons and squats of a thousand pounds. This last turned out to be a solid fact for the incredible Paul Anderson. He was squatting with almost twice as much as anyone else's maximum." – Oliver Sacks (powerlifter & neurologist)
- "Anderson overcame the limits of human capabilities .. I eagerly absorbed the crumbs of information about his training from the sports magazines. I tried to understand the nature of his amazing power. I did not associate it only with body weight. There should have been something in his training, different from the accepted norms." – Yuri Vlasov (weightlifter)
- "Absolutely no question, Paul was the strongest of the strong. His physical deterioration and prolonged illness for the last 16 years of his life was a fate unbefitting such a great strongman and humanitarian. Paul was really a powerlifter and did the overhead lifts only because powerlifting as a sport did not exist 40 years ago. He excelled and was world and Olympic champ because he was far stronger than anyone else. When I hear people talk that a powerlifter will never win an Olympic gold medal, I tell them that Paul Anderson already did it, almost forty years ago." – Bruce Wilhelm (strongman)
