= Hugh Cassidy =

American 1971 world champion powerlifter

- Born: Truman Hugh Cassidy; December 31, 1935 (age 90); San Francisco, California, U.S.
- Occupation: Powerlifter
- Height: 5 ft 10 in (1.78 m)
- Children: 4, including Eva Cassidy

Competition record

Powerlifting

Representing United States

AAU World Powerlifting Championships
1st	1971	+110kg

AAU US National Powerlifting Championships
3rd	1970	+110kg
1st	1971	+110kg

Truman Hugh Cassidy (born December 31, 1935), better known as Hugh Cassidy, is an American metal sculptor, jazz musician, and former powerlifter who competed in powerlifting just prior to the formation of the International Powerlifting Federation (IPF). In 1971, he became U.S. National Powerlifting Champion as well as World Powerlifting Champion at the inaugural Amateur Athletic Union (AAU) World Championships, defeating the young soon-to-be all-time greats Jim Williams and John Kuc in the super heavyweight division.

== Early life ==
Cassidy was born in San Francisco, California. He is of Irish and Scottish descent.

== Powerlifting career ==
Cassidy's lifting career was quite short, starting in 1965 and ending in 1971. Formerly, he wanted to become an Olympic weightlifter but had problems mastering the necessary technique. Being naturally lean and standing 5-foot-10-inches tall, he knew he had to put on a lot of weight to become a successful powerlifter, so he pushed his bodyweight quickly from 175 to approximately 290 pounds. At his maximum body weight, he became a world-class super-heavyweight lifter in the early 1970s and got his nickname "Huge" for his bodyweight and appearance. Cassidy achieved his best performance at the inaugural AAU World Championships with his personal record total of 2160 lbs (800 lbs squat, 570 lbs bench press, 790 lbs deadlift). Within 6 months after his World Championship win, he suffered a knee injury which ended his lifting career.

=== Powerlifting meet results ===
- 3rd place in the AAU US National Powerlifting Championships 1970, +110 kg (+242 lb) Class (New Orleans, Louisiana)

Squat: 729.95lb, Bench: 539.91lb, Deadlift: 740.09lb — Total: 2009.95lb

- 1st place in the AAU US National Powerlifting Championships 1971 110 kg (242 lb) Class (Dallas, Texas)

Squat: 760lb, Bench: 520lb, Deadlift: 780lb — Total: 2060lb

- 1st place in the AAU World Powerlifting Championships 1971 +110 kg (+242 lb) Class (York, Pennsylvania)

Squat: 800lb, Bench: 570lb, Deadlift: 790lb — Total: 2160lb

== Personal powerlifting records ==
done in official competition

- Squat: 800 lbs (363 kg) raw with ace-bandage knee wraps without a belt
- Bench Press: 570 lbs (258.6 kg) raw (with a 2 second pause)
- Deadlift: 800 lbs (363 kg) raw
- Powerlifting Total: 2160 lbs (800-570-790) / 979.8 kg (363-258.6-358.2) raw with ace-bandage wraps

== Personal life ==
Besides being a world class powerlifter, Cassidy was a teacher and a jazz musician as well as a nationally known metal sculptor. In the military he was an army medic. He is married to Barbara Kratzer Cassidy, a German horticulturist. They have four children, including the well-known singer Eva Cassidy, who died at age 33.

== See also ==
- Jim Williams
- John Kuc
- Jon Cole
