= 1983 World's Strongest Man =

Strongman competition in 1983

Competition information
- Dates: 26–27 November 1983
- Location: Christchurch
- Country: New Zealand
- Athletes participating: 8
- Nations participating: 7

Champion(s)
- (United Kingdom) Geoff Capes

The 1983 World's Strongest Man was the seventh edition of World's Strongest Man and was won by Geoff Capes from the United Kingdom. It was his first title. Jón Páll Sigmarsson from Iceland finished second, and Simon Wulfse from the Netherlands third. The winner of the three previous competitions, Bill Kazmaier, was not invited to compete again in this year. The contest was held at Christchurch, New Zealand. The title of the competition, formerly "World's Strongest Men", was changed to the current title for this competition.

== Events ==
There were a total of 8 different events used in the competition:

- Fergus Walk (Farmer's Walk 175 lb. logs for distance in 90 s) – Winner JP Sigmarsson
- Steel bar bend – Winner Simon Wulfse (only one to bend 15mm to 8inch distance)
- Cheese Deadlift (18" off the floor with straps allowed) Winner Tom Magee 1180 lbs
- Truck Pull (10 tons over 35m) – Winner Geoff Capes 43s. The original tractor was replaced because no contestant could move it.
- Natural Stone Overhead Press – Winner John Gamble 126 kg
- Weight Toss (56 lbs weight over bar throw) – Winner Geoff Capes 15'6"
- Wool Bale Hoist (250 lbs) – Winner JP Sigmarsson 9'10.5"
- Sack Load (10 sacks each 168 lbs.) – Winner JP Sigmarsson 1:31.7

== Final results ==
| # | Name | Nationality | Farmers Walk | Bar Bend | Deadlift | Truck Pull | Stone Press | Weight Toss | Bale Hoist | Sack Load | Pts |
|---|---|---|---|---|---|---|---|---|---|---|---|
| 1 | Geoff Capes | United Kingdom | 7 | 6 | 2 | 8 | 4.5 | 8 | 7 | 7 | 49.5 |
| 2 | Jón Páll Sigmarsson | Iceland | 8 | 4 | 7 | 1 | 6.5 | 5.5 | 8 | 8 | 48 |
| 3 | Simon Wulfse | Netherlands | 6 | 8 | 4 | 7 | 6.5 | 5.5 | 4 | 6 | 47 |
| 4 | Tom Magee | Canada | 4 | 7 | 8 | 5 | 4.5 | 7 | 2 | 1 | 38.5 |
| 5 | John Gamble | United States | 2 | 5 | 5 | 2 | 8 | 1.5 | 5 | 4 | 32.5 |
| 6 | Chris Okonkwo | Nigeria | 5 | 3 | 1 | 6 | 2.5 | 4 | 1 | 3 | 25.5 |
| 7 | Doyle Kenady | United States | 1 | 2 | 6 | 4 | 2.5 | 1.5 | 3 | 4 | 24 |
| 8 | Alan Hallberg | New Zealand | 3 | 1 | 3 | 3 | 1 | 3 | 6 | 2 | 22 |

| Preceded by 1982 World's Strongest Man | 1983 World's Strongest Man | Succeeded by 1984 World's Strongest Man |
