= Weightlifting at the 1956 Summer Olympics – Men's +90 kg =

Weightlifting at the Olympics

Men's +90 kg at the Games of the XVI Olympiad
- Venue: Royal Exhibition Building
- Date: 26 November 1956
- Competitors: 9 from 9 nations
- Winning total: 500 kg OR

Medalists
1st place, gold medalist(s)		Paul Anderson	United States
2nd place, silver medalist(s)		Humberto Selvetti	Argentina
3rd place, bronze medalist(s)		Alberto Pigaiani	Italy

The men's +90 kg weightlifting competitions at the 1956 Summer Olympics in Melbourne took place on 26 November at the Royal Exhibition Building. It was the eighth appearance of the heavyweight class, and second time at the above-90 kg weight. Previously, all weightlifters above 82.5 kg were included in the heavyweight class.

== Competition format ==
Each weightlifter had three attempts at each of the three lifts. The best score for each lift was summed to give a total. The weightlifter could increase the weight between attempts (minimum of 5 kg between first and second attempts, 2.5 kg between second and third attempts) but could not decrease weight. If two or more weightlifters finished with the same total, the competitors' body weights were used as the tie-breaker (lighter athlete wins).

== Records ==
Prior to this competition, the existing world and Olympic records were as follows.

World record	Press	Paul Anderson (USA)	185.5 kg		1955
World record	Snatch	Norbert Schemansky (USA)	150 kg		1954
World record	Clean & Jerk	Paul Anderson (USA)	196.5 kg		1955
World record	Total	Paul Anderson (USA)	512.2 kg	Munich, West Germany	16 October 1955
Olympic record	Press	John Davis (USA); Humberto Selvetti (ARG)	150 kg	Helsinki, Finland	27 July 1952
Olympic record	Snatch	John Davis (USA)	145 kg	Helsinki, Finland	27 July 1952
Olympic record	Clean & Jerk	John Davis (USA)	177.5 kg	London, United Kingdom	11 August 1948
Olympic record	Total	John Davis (USA)	460 kg	Helsinki, Finland	27 July 1952

== Results ==
Rank	Athlete	Nation	Body weight	Press (kg)				Snatch (kg)				Clean & Jerk (kg)				Total
Rank	Athlete	Nation	Body weight	1	2	3	Result	1	2	3	Result	1	2	3	Result	Total
1st place, gold medalist(s)	Paul Anderson	United States	137.90	167.5	~~172.5~~	~~172.5~~	167.5	140	~~145~~	145	145	~~187.5~~	~~187.5~~	187.5	187.5 OR	500 OR
2nd place, silver medalist(s)	Humberto Selvetti	Argentina	143.50	165	175	~~180~~	175 OR	135	140	145	145 =OR	170	180	~~185~~	180	500 OR
3rd place, bronze medalist(s)	Alberto Pigaiani	Italy	131.80	145	~~150~~	150	150	125	~~130~~	130	130	165	172.5	~~175~~	172.5	452.5
4	Firouz Pojhan	Iran	99.50	140	147.5	~~150~~	147.5	125	130	132.5	132.5	162.5	170	~~175~~	170	450
5	Eino Mäkinen	Finland	108.60	122.5	127.5	~~130~~	127.5	130	135	137.5	137.5	162.5	167.5	~~172.5~~	167.5	432.5
6	Dave Baillie	Canada	125.60	140	147.5	~~155~~	147.5	122.5	~~130~~	~~130~~	122.5	155	~~162.5~~	162.5	162.5	432.5
7	Franz Hölbl	Austria	123.80	142.5	~~147.5~~	~~147.5~~	142.5	120	125	~~127.5~~	125	~~157.5~~	157.5	~~165~~	157.5	425
8	Hugh Jones	New Zealand	120.70	117.5	125	~~130~~	125	115	122.5	~~127.5~~	122.5	145	150	~~155~~	150	397.5
9	Dandamudi Rajagopal	India	113.00	115	122.5	~~130~~	122.5	100	105	~~110~~	105	~~132.5~~	132.5	~~137.5~~	132.5	360

== New records ==
Press	175 kg	Humberto Selvetti (ARG)	OR
Snatch	145 kg	Paul Anderson (USA); Humberto Selvetti (ARG)	=OR
Clean & Jerk	187.5 kg	Paul Anderson (USA)	OR
Total	500 kg	Paul Anderson (USA); Humberto Selvetti (ARG)	OR
