= Bret Hart vs. Tom Magee =

Professional wrestling match

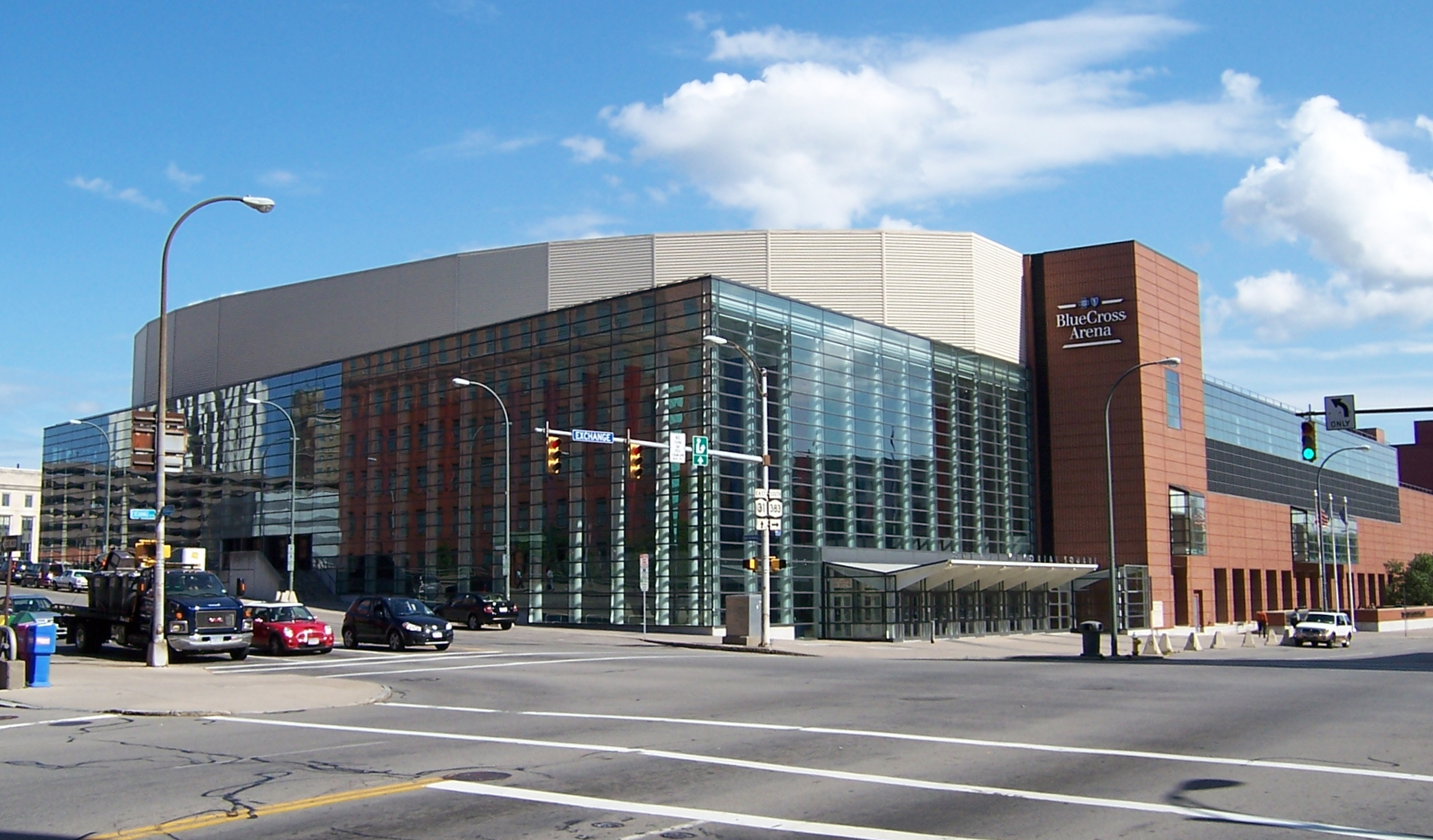
- The Rochester War Memorial Arena (now the Blue Cross Arena), where the match took place.
- Date: October 7, 1986
- Venue: Rochester War Memorial Arena

Kayfabe
Wrestler		Bret Hart	Tom Magee

Working
- Booker(s): Vince McMahon
- Promotion(s): World Wrestling Federation
- Position: 1st on the card
- Stipulation(s): Singles match

Result
- Tom Magee defeats Bret Hart

Bret Hart vs. Tom Magee was a professional wrestling match between Bret Hart and Tom Magee, of the World Wrestling Federation (WWF). The un-televised match took place at the Rochester War Memorial Arena in Rochester, New York on October 7, 1986 as part of a WWF Wrestling Challenge taping.

== Context ==
The infamous match, which was one of Magee's first after signing with the WWF, and was a carry job by Hart, which impressed WWF chairman Vince McMahon and Pat Patterson, who felt Magee was the next Hulk Hogan.

== Preservation status ==
The tape was thought to have been lost, as the WWE could not locate it in its vault. This led many professional wrestling tape traders to consider it a "holy grail". Professional wrestling photographer Mary-Kate Anthony had previously helped Bret Hart convert his VHS copies of his movies into digital, and Hart did not request the physical VHS tapes back. In March 2019, Anthony announced on Twitter she had located the tape. On May 13, 2019, the WWE Network aired a documentary entitled Holy Grail: The Search for WWE's Most Infamous Lost Match which detailed the legend behind the match and the recovery of the tape, and also featured interviews with Magee and Hart.
