= John Gamble (American football) =

American powerlifter

Personal information
- Born: John Gamble (United States) Richmond, Virginia, U.S.
- Occupation(s): Strongman, Powerlifter, Strength and conditioning coach
- Height: 5 ft 11 in (1.80 m)
Medal record
Strongman
Representing United States
World's Strongest Man
3rd	1982 World's Strongest Man
5th	1983 World's Strongest Man
Powerlifting
Representing United States
IPF World Powerlifting Championships
1st	1982	125kg

John Gamble is a former world champion powerlifter and strongman competitor from Richmond, Virginia.

== Collegiate career ==
Gamble played linebacker at Hampton University and was a first-team Black College All-America selection. He also earned All-Central Intercollegiate Athletic Association honors in football and in track and field.

== Weightlifting and strongman career ==
World-renowned in the fields of powerlifting and strongman competition, Gamble was the top ranked powerlifter in the world in the 275-pound class from 1981 to 1983. His personal records for total pounds in three lifts while competing in the United States Powerlifting Federation was 2,270 pounds, and he has personal bests of full squat, 892 lb; bench press, 573 lb; and dead lift, 826.5 lb in those three lifts. Gamble was inducted into the U.S. Weightlifting Hall of Fame in York, Pennsylvania, in June 1999.

He competed twice in the final of the World's Strongest Man competition. In the 1982 World's Strongest Man he finished 3rd behind compatriot Bill Kazmaier at Magic Mountain, California and at the 1983 World's Strongest Man he placed 5th in a competition won by Geoff Capes in Christchurch, New Zealand.

== Coaching career ==
=== University of Virginia ===
Gamble served ten years (1984–1993) as the head strength coach at the University of Virginia. He also served two seasons as assistant strength coach (1982–83)] and one year on a part-time basis (1981) at Virginia. He was named 1985 Strength Coach of the Year by the National Strength and Conditioning Association.

=== Miami Dolphins ===
Gamble became strength and conditioning coach for the Miami Dolphins in 1994 under head coach Don Shula, and remained at the post for 12 years through 2005. In 1998, he was named by the Professional Strength Coaches Society as its Coach of the Year.

In 2006, under then head coach Nick Saban, Gamble was given the title of director of player development/special assistant to the head coach. His job title was changed simply to director of player development under head coach Cam Cameron in 2007.

=== Buffalo Bills ===
Gamble served as the co-strength and conditioning coordinator for the Buffalo Bills of the National Football League from February 9, 2010 until he was dismissed on December 31, 2012.
