= Jon Cole (weightlifter) =

American Olympic athlete (1943–2013)

Personal information
- Born: April 1, 1943 (United States) Chicago, Illinois
- Died: January 10, 2013 (aged 69) Phoenix, AZ
- Occupation(s): Discus thrower, Powerlifting, Olympic weightlifting, strongman, personal trainer
- Height: 5 ft 10 in (1.78 m)
Medal record
Strongman
Representing United States
World's Strongest Man
| 6th | 1977 World's Strongest Man |
Powerlifting
Representing United States
AAU US National Powerlifting Championships
| 1st | 1968 | 110kg |
| 1st | 1970 | 110kg |
| 1st | 1972 | +110kg |

Jon Frederic Cole (April 1, 1943 – January 10, 2013) was a discus thrower, powerlifter, Olympic weightlifter and strongman from the United States. He is widely regarded as one of the most versatile strength athletes of all time.

He competed in powerlifting just prior to the formation of the International Powerlifting Federation (IPF). Having set world records in the squat, deadlift and Total during his career, he was multiple times AAU US National Powerlifting Champion as well as an Olympic weightlifter, discus thrower and shot-putter. Being the "premier strongman" of the early 1970s for his overall excellence in powerlifting, Olympic lifting and strength-based track and field, Cole was at one time known as the "strongest man in the world" for holding the greatest combined powerlifting/weightlifting super total of all time. He was not only officially the first man in history to total 2200 lbs, he also became the first man to squat over 900 lbs (raw with knee wraps) as well as the first to total 2300 lbs in competition on October 28, 1972 (shortly followed two weeks later by John Kuc with 905 and 2350 lbs on November 11). While past his prime as a lifter, he competed in the inaugural World's Strongest Man competition in 1977, where he finished in 6th place.

== Early athletics career ==
Cole was born in Chicago, Illinois, and grew up in Arizona. He began weight training at the age of 12 after buying his first weight set. In high school, he competed in track and field, including sprinting and throwing events.

=== High school ===
Cole entered Glendale High School in 1959, where he was all-state in track and field for two years and high school state champion in the Discus throw as a junior and senior. He set the national high school record as a junior and was named to the national high-school All-American track and field team of 1961 and 1962.

- National high school record in Discus 178 ft. 8 in. (1961)
- First place in Discus at the Golden West Invitational (GWI) 1962 (GWI invites the top five athletes of the United States in each track and field event)
- High school Discus throw state champion 1961 and 1962

=== College ===
Cole graduated with academic and athletic honors, and accepted a four-year full scholarship from Arizona State University. While at ASU he set the school, state, and conference records in the Discus and Shot Put, and was named an NCAA and AAU All American in 1965 and 1966.

- Western athletic conference Discus champion 1965 and 1966
- ASU school record in Discus 199 ft. 5 ½ in. (1966)
- ASU school record in Shot Put 61 ft. 11 ½ in. (1966)

=== After College ===
After finishing College in 1969, Cole went on to compete in Track and Field, powerlifting and Olympic lifting at the same time. Besides setting numerous records in discus and shot put, his probably biggest achievement as a track athlete is his first place in the discus throw at the National AAU Track and Field Championships in 1969, where he threw the discus 208 ft 10 in (63.65 m) for a National AAU Discus record and was named the outstanding Athlete of the championships. He even defeated the great discus thrower and Olympic silver medalist Jay Silvester on that day. Some of his track records and achievements are:

- Holder of record for the state of Arizona in Shot Put 63 ft. 1 in. (1968)
- Holder of record for the state of Arizona in Discus 216 ft. 3 in. (1969)
- National AAU Discus record of 208 ft 10 in. (1996)
- National AAU Discus champion 1969
- Selected to the USA track team and competed in Europe 1969

Versatile and Athletic Achievements Witnessed and Verified

- 100-yard dash in 9.9 seconds at a body weight of 258 lbs. in AAU track meet 1969
- Baseball throw of 435 ft., measured by ASU Baseball Coach Bob Winkles 1967
- Place kicked a Football 68 yards, witness and measured by ASU Football Coach Frank Kush 1967
- Javelin throw 241 ft. AAU track meet 1968
- Discus 231 ft. 7 in. AAU track meet 1972
- Shot Put 71 ft. 4 in. AAU track meet 1972

Cole is also the only person in the world to win two national AAU titles in two sports - Powerlifting, Track and Field - and be named the "Outstanding Performer" in both 1969 and 1970. Cole held more than 200 marks in U.S. and European meets in discus and the shot put, according to Sports Illustrated, which ranked him No. 18 on its list of the top 50 Arizona athletes of the 20th century.

== Olympic weightlifting career ==
Due to his focus on powerlifting, Cole competed in only few weightlifting competitions. Becoming a three time Arizona national champion and totaling up to 1,200 pounds while competing in the super heavyweight division, however, he proved to be one of the best Olympic weightlifters in the United States during those days, in which Ken Patera was the most dominant American super heavyweight lifter with a total of 1,300 pounds.

=== Meet results ===
- 1st place in the Arizona AAU state Olympic heavyweight championships 1967 setting four state records:

Clean and Press: 375lb, Clean and Jerk: 380lb, Snatch: 300lb---Total: 1,055lb

- 1st place in the Arizona AAU state Olympic heavyweight championships 1969 setting four state records:

Clean and Press: 380lb, Clean and Jerk: 400lb, Snatch: 310lb---Total: 1,090lb

- 1st place in the Arizona AAU state Olympic heavyweight championships 1972 setting four state records:

Clean and Press: 430lb, Clean and Jerk: 430lb, Snatch: 340lb---Total: 1,200lb

== Powerlifting career ==
Cole began to compete in powerlifting during his college time and in 1968, decided to participate in his first AAU National Power Lifting Championships. Cole, who was an unknown in the national powerlifting scene, shocked the lifting community by winning the heavyweight division instantly; and was named the meets "Outstanding Performer". He continued to show outstanding performances breaking 62 official National, American, and World Records as a Heavyweight and Super Heavyweight.

Cole was not only officially the first man in history to total 2200 pounds, he was also the first man to squat more than 900 pounds and the first man to total 2300 pounds and he did it raw with only knee wraps. He deadlifted more than 800 and occasionally got close to 900 pounds – all on a frame of about 280 pounds and was the first man to deadlift 400 kg (882 lb) as well.

Lifters in the early days of the sport went largely without supportive gear, which makes Cole's lifting stats even more impressive. His greatest powerlifting total of 2364 pounds was done on October 28, 1972, when Cole weighed 283.0 pounds. It remained the greatest raw total ever in the 308 pounds weight class for 44 years until Eric Lilliebridge surpassed it in 2016. In addition to that, Cole's 2135 pound raw total in 242 weight class performed on March 14, 1971 remained unbeaten for 45 years until Larry Wheels surpassed it in 2016.

=== Feuds ===
Cole's numbers didn't come without any criticism. Cole performed most of his record-breaking lifts in rather small local meets in his hometown in Arizona. There was some rumor that he used "suspect" technique with his 885-pound deadlift. He lifted the bar to his knees, then leaned back and dragged it up his thighs, which he had rubbed with oil. Fellow competing powerlifter Jim Williams called Cole's lifting "Circus tricks" and challenged him to face him at the inaugural AAU World Powerlifting Championships 1971. The oncoming duel between these two powerlifting titans was labeled the "feud of the century". Although Cole had vowed to take the challenge, he injured himself shortly before the championships to the point, where he was physically unable to lift, and would therefore not attend. Williams did not win the world championships either – it was Hugh Cassidy, who became the first world powerlifting champion since the formation of the AAU.

=== Meet results ===
- 1st place in the AAU US National Powerlifting Championships 1968, 110 kg (242 lb) Class (Los Angeles, California)

Squat: 705lb, Bench: 465lb, Deadlift: 720lb---Total: 1890lb

- 1st place in the AAU US National Powerlifting Championships 1970 110 kg (242 lb) Class (New Orleans, Louisiana)

Squat: 760lb, Bench: 520lb, Deadlift: 780lb---Total: 2060lb

- 1st place in the AAU Arizona State Powerlifting Championships 1971 110 kg (242 lb) Class (Phoenix, Arizona)

Squat: 800lb, Bench: 525lb, Deadlift: 815lb---Total: 2140lb (3/14/71 @240.0 lbs, which later weighed out at 2135 lbs (797/525/813))

- 1st place in the AAU US National Powerlifting Championships 1972 +110 kg (+242 lb) Class (Denver, Colorado)

Squat: 865lb, Bench: 570lb, Deadlift: 820lb---Total: 2255lb (09/17/72 @ 271.0 lbs, which later weighed out at 2259 lbs (869/570/820))

- 1st place in the AAU Arizona State Powerlifting Championships 1972 +110 kg (+242 lb) Class (Phoenix, Arizona)

Squat: 905lb Bench: 580 lb, Deadlift: 885lb---Total: 2370lb (10/28/72 @ 283.0 lbs, which later weighed out at 2364 lbs (901.5/580/882.5))

== Strongman ==
Cole was invited to compete in the inaugural World's Strongest Man competition in 1977, finishing 6th while being past his prime. Olympic weightlifter Bruce Wilhelm won that year's as well as 1978's competition. These early WSM competitions were still a contest primarily consisting of American athletes.

== Life after competition ==
In his later years, Cole used his knowledge as a strength prodigy to help others improve as well. He worked as a strength coach at ASU, helping the Sun Devil football program to prominence in the 1970s. Cole became a successful businessman with his own health club called "Jon Cole Systems", based in Scottsdale. He has been strength consultant to the Phoenix Suns, Phoenix RoadRunners and many other professional athletes residing in the Phoenix area.

Cole died of lung failure on January 10, 2013.

== Personal records ==
=== Powerlifting ===
In competition

- Squat – 901.5 lb (408.9 kg) raw with ace-bandage knee wraps (905.0 lbs @ 283.0 lbs, which later weighed out at 901.5 lbs)
- Bench Press – 580 lb (263.1 kg) raw
- Deadlift – 882.5 lb (400.3 kg) in marathon suit (885.0 lb. @ 283.0 lb., which later weighed out at 882.5 lb.)
- Total – 2,364 lb (1,072.3 kg) (901.5/580/882.5) raw with marathon suit and ace-bandage wraps (2370 lbs (905/580/885) @ 283.0 lbs, which later weighed out at 2364 lbs (901.5/580/882.5))
  - 2364 lbs (901.5/580.0/882.5) @308 lb class (1972 Phoenix, Arizona) (AAU)
  - 2259 lbs (869.0/570.0/820.0) @275 lb class (1972 Denver, Colorado) (AAU)
  - 2135 lbs (797.0/525.0/813.0) @242 lb class (1971 Tolleson, Arizona) (AAU)

→ 308 total and 242 total raw world records were not surpassed for 44 and 45 years respectively

In training/ self claims

- Bench Press – 610 lb (276.7 kg) raw

=== Weightlifting ===
- Clean and press – 430 lb (195.0 kg)
- Snatch – 340 lb (154.2 kg)
- Clean and jerk – 430 lb (195.0 kg)
- 2-lift Olympic total – 770 lb (349.3 kg) (snatch + clean and jerk)
- 3-lift Olympic total – 1,200 lb (544.3 kg)(clean and press + snatch + clean and jerk)

→ clean and press was removed as a competitive lift after the 1972 Summer Olympics in Munich

=== Combined lifting totals ===
==== 5 lift Supertotals ====
- Combined official Supertotal (official weightlifting total + official powerlifting total):
  770 lb (349 kg) + 2,364 lb (1,072 kg) = 3,134 lb (1,422 kg)
- Career aggregate Supertotal (Individual 5 lift PR weightlifting & powerlifting total):
  340 lb (154 kg) + 430 lb (195 kg) + 901.5 lb (409 kg) + 610 lb (277 kg) + 882.5 lb (400 kg) = 3,164 lb (1,435 kg)

→ former highest combined 5 lift Supertotal in history (from 1972 to 1995) surpassed only by Mark Henry and Mikhail Koklyaev

==== 6 lift Supertotals ====
- Combined official Supertotal (official weightlifting total + official powerlifting total):
  1,200 lb (544 kg) + 2,364 lb (1,072 kg) = 3,564 lb (1,617 kg)
- Career aggregate Supertotal (Individual 6 lift PR weightlifting & powerlifting total):
  430 lb (195 kg) + 340 lb (154 kg) + 430 lb (195 kg) + 901.5 lb (409 kg) + 610 lb (277 kg) + 882.5 lb (400 kg) = 3,594 lb (1,630 kg)

→ highest combined 6 lift Supertotal in history

== See also ==
- Jim Williams
- John Kuc
- Hugh Cassidy
- Don Reinhoudt
- Paul Anderson
