= Jerry McKenna =

American sculptor

Jerry McKenna is an American sculptor, notable for his bronze sculptures of military leaders, religious figures and sports stars.

== Early life and education ==
McKenna was born on December 28, 1937, in Connellsville, PA. He has lived in Texas for over forty years. He attended Boys Catholic High School in Augusta, Georgia, Bradley Central High School in Cleveland, Tennessee and St. Edward High School in Lakewood, Ohio. He began his formal study of art at the age of fourteen at the Gertrude Herbert School of Art in Augusta, Georgia. Later, he continued his studies at the American Academy of Art in Chicago and at the San Antonio Art Institute. He received Bachelor of Fine Arts degree from the University of Notre Dame, where he was influenced by the sculptor-in-residence, Ivan Meštrović. He also received a Master of Arts from Webster University in 1981.

== Career ==
McKenna is a former U.S. Air Force officer and decorated Vietnam War veteran. His early recognition as a sculptor came from his bronze portraits of Air Force generals, including Generals Henry "Hap" Arnold," Jimmy Doolittle, Doyle E. Larson, Billy Mitchell, Ira C. Eaker, and John Dale Ryan In 1994, McKenna was commissioned to create The Lincoln-Douglas Debate that stands in Lincoln-Douglas Square in Alton, Ill, where the last of the debates took place in 1857.

McKenna's sports sculptures include seventeen portrait busts in the Pro Football Hall of Fame, Knute Rockne at the College Football Hall of Fame and his birthplace in Voss Municipality, Norway, sculptures of Charles A. Comiskey at U. S. Cellular Field in Chicago, Dan Devine, George Gipp, Frank Leahy, Lou Holtz, Ara Parseghian and Moose Krause at Notre Dame Stadium, Elroy "Crazylegs" Hirsch for the University of Wisconsin, The French Connection (ice hockey) (Rick Martin, Gilbert Perrault, and René Robert) at First Niagara Center in Buffalo, NY; Basketball coach Bill Sudeck at Western Reserve University; hurling star Ollie Walsh in County Kilkenny, Ireland, two sculptures of Tim Horton—one in Buffalo and the other in Hamilton, Ontario, and his sculpture of the late Ralph Wilson, founder and owner of the Buffalo Bills, unveiled in September 2015. McKenna also created the life size sculpture of Olympic Gold medalist in weightlifting, Paul Anderson. The sculpture stands in the Paul Anderson Memorial Park in Toccoa, Georgia.

== Awards and honors ==
McKenna received the University of Notre Dame's 1962 Emil Jacques Medal of Fine Arts and the 2001 Rev. Anthony J. Lauck Award. Also, in 2001, McKenna was awarded an Honorary ND Monogram by the Notre Dame National Monogram Club. He was named the 2003 Sports Sculptor of the Year by the All-American Football Foundation. In 2013, Irish America Magazine added him to their list of the Top 100 Irish Americans. In 2014, the National Collegiate Athletic Association (NCAA) named his sculpture of The Four Horsemen as the number one in their list of the Top Five Statues in College Football. In November 2024, McKenna was made an honorary member of the Airlift/Tanker Hall of Fame at Scott AFB, Illinois.

== Personal life ==
McKenna lives in the small Texas Hill Country community of Boerne, Texas and works in a studio that was originally built as a cattle barn. He has both U.S. and Irish citizenship and spends part of each year in Ireland. In 2016, was named Chieftain of the worldwide Clann MacKenna, at a ceremony in County Monaghan, Ireland. In June 2016, he was inducted into the Lou Holtz/Upper Ohio Valley Hall of Fame.

McKenna was married to Stephanie Lyn Hawkins from 1961 to 1971, and Gail Ann Thomas from 1972–present. He has one daughter, four sons and eleven grandchildren and one great-grandchild.
