= 1979 World's Strongest Man =

Strongman competition in 1979

Competition information
- Dates: 1979
- Venue: Universal Studios
- Location: Los Angeles, California
- Country: United States
- Athletes participating: 10
- Nations participating: 3

Champion(s)
- (United States) Don Reinhoudt

The 1979 World's Strongest Man was the third edition of World's Strongest Man and was won by Don Reinhoudt from the United States. It was his first title after finishing second the previous year. Lars Hedlund from Sweden finished second after finishing third the previous year, and Bill Kazmaier also from the United States finished third. The contest was held at the Universal Studios, California.

== Final results ==
#	Name	Nationality	Pts
1	Don Reinhoudt	United States	60.3
2	Lars Hedlund	Sweden	45.6
3	Bill Kazmaier	United States	44.9
4	Jon Kolb	United States	41.43
5	Bob Young	United States	22.33
6	Cleve Dean	United States	14.4
7	Joseph Dube	United States	4.4
8	Dave Johns	United States	2
9	Bill Anderson	United Kingdom	1.33 (injured)
10	Jerry Blackwell	United States	0 (injured)

Preceded by 1978 World's Strongest Man	1979 World's Strongest Man	Succeeded by 1980 World's Strongest Man
