= Pius Ochieng =

Kenyan weightlifter

Personal information
- Nationality: Kenyan
- Born: 20 July 1960 (age 64)

Sport
- Sport: Weightlifting

Pius Ochieng (born 20 July 1960) is a Kenyan weightlifter and strongman. Initially competing as a strongman, Ochieng would represent Kenya at the 1984 World's Strongest Man and placed eighth overall. In the same year, Ochieng would represent Kenya at the 1984 Summer Olympics in weightlifting and become the first Kenyan weightlifter to compete at an Olympic Games.

Ochieng would compete in the men's first-heavyweight event against fifteen other lifters. There, he would place tenth. He would also compete at the 1984 Summer Olympics in the men's heavyweight event. There, he would place fifteenth out of the 20 competitors that competed in the event.

== Biography ==
Pius Ochieng was born on 20 July 1960. Ochieng would initially compete as a strongman, representing Kenya at the 1984 World's Strongest Man in Mora, Sweden. There, he would place eighth overall with a total number of 18.5 points.

In the same year, Ochieng would compete at the 1984 Summer Olympics in Los Angeles, United States, representing Kenya in weightlifting. He would be the first Kenyan weightlifter to compete at an Olympic Games. He would compete in the men's first-heavyweight event for lifters that weighed between 90 and 100 kilograms in bodyweight. He would compete on 7 August against fifteen other competitors. There, he would place 10th with a total of 300 kilograms.

After the 1984 Summer Games, he would again represent Kenya at another Olympic Games. He would compete at the 1988 Summer Olympics in Seoul, South Korea. There, he would compete in the men's heavyweight event for lifters that weighed between 100 and 110 kilograms in bodyweight. He would compete on 27 September against 19 other competitors. There, he would place 15th with a total of 290 kilograms.
