= 1981 World's Strongest Man =

Strongman competition in 1981

Competition information
- Dates: 1981
- Venue: Six Flags Magic Mountain
- Location: Santa Clarita, California
- Country: United States
- Athletes participating: 10
- Nations participating: 4

Champion(s)
- (United States) Bill Kazmaier

The 1981 World's Strongest Man was the fifth edition of World's Strongest Man and was won by Bill Kazmaier from the United States. It was his second consecutive title. Geoff Capes from the United Kingdom finished second after finishing third the previous year, and Dave Waddington from the United States finished third. The contest was held at Magic Mountain, California.

This was the first World's Strongest Man competition where the Tug Of War did not end the competition. Previously, the four highest scorers after the penultimate event competed in a head to head tug of war battle with the last man standing winning the event.

== Events ==
There were a total of 11 different events used in the competition:

- Overhead Log lift (wooden log) – Winner Bill Kazmaier 360lbs
- Weight Toss (56lbs weight over bar throw) – Winner Geoff Capes 17 feet 1/4 inch
- Truck Pull (16200lbs truck pull over 100foot course in heats) – Winner Geoff Capes 30.95 s
- Engine Race (800lbs over 150feet uphill course) – Winner Bill Kazmaier
- Beer Keg Load – (12 kegs 167 lbs. each) – Bill Kazmaier in 49.11 s
- Battery Hold (65 lbs. at arm's length) – Winner Durwin Piper 43.63 s
- Steel Bar Bend – Winner Geoff Capes
- Cement Block Squat (Smith machine squat) – Winner Bill Kazmaier 969 lbs.
- Silver Dollar Deadlift (18" off the floor with straps allowed) Winner Bill Kazmaier 940lbs (executed two repetitions)
- Caber Toss – Winner Joe Zaliezniak 40'
- Sumo Challenge – Winner Keith Bishop

== Final results ==
#	Name	Nationality	Log Lift	Weight Toss	Truck Pull	Engine Race	Keg Load	Battery Hold	Bar Bend	Squat	Deadlift	Caber	Sumo	Pts
1	Bill Kazmaier	United States	10	9	8	10	10	7	9	10	10	6	7	96
2	Geoff Capes	United Kingdom	4	10	10	9	9	4	10	4	4	8	16	88
3	Dave Waddington	United States			6		8	9		8.5	8.5	9		72.5
4	Jerry Hannan	United States	8	7	5			8			8.5			68
5	Craig Wolfley	United States	8		1			6					18	63
6	Keith Bishop	United States			7		5	3					20	61.5
7	Stago Piczko	Netherlands	8		9		6	5						59
8	Durwin Piper	United States			2			10		8.5				58
9	Joe Zaliezniak	United States			4	8		1	8			10		48
10	Bishop Dolegiewicz	Canada		8	3		7	2				7		46

Preceded by 1980 World's Strongest Man	1981 World's Strongest Man	Succeeded by 1982 World's Strongest Man
