= Lars Hedlund =

Swedish strength athlete (1949–2016)

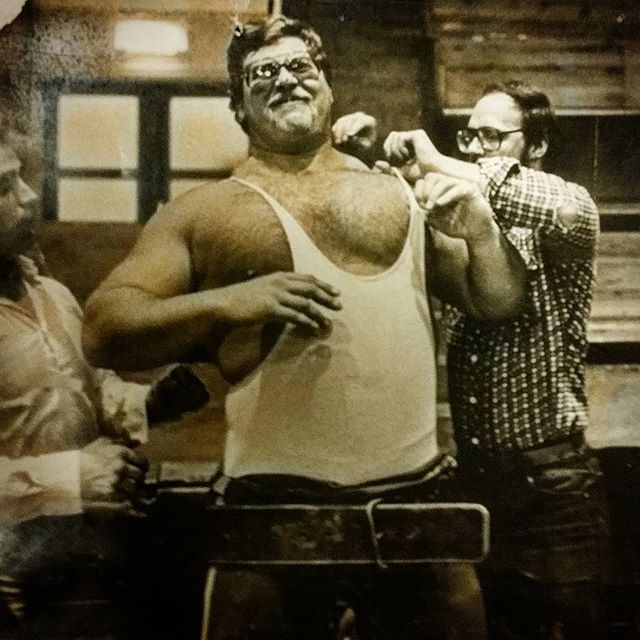
- Lars Hedlund

Personal information
- Born: January 24, 1949 Sweden
- Died: June 4, 2016
- Occupation(s): Strongman, powerlifting
- Height: 191 cm (6 ft 3 in)
Medal record
Strongman
Representing Sweden
World's Strongest Man
3rd	1978 World's Strongest Man
2nd	1979 World's Strongest Man
2nd	1980 World's Strongest Man
Europe's Strongest Man
1st	1981 Europe's Strongest Man
Powerlifting
Representing Sweden
IPF World Powerlifting Championships
6th	1977 IPF World Championships	+110kg
3rd	1979 IPF World Championships	+110kg
EPF European Powerlifting Championships
3rd	1978 EPF European Championships	+110kg
2nd	1979 EPF European Championships	+110kg
1st	1980 EPF European Championships	+125kg
NPF Nordic Powerlifting Championships
1st	1979 NPF Nordic Championships	+110kg

Lars Hedlund (January 24, 1949 – June 4, 2016), was a former strongman and powerlifter from Sweden.

== Strongman ==
Lars competed in three World's Strongest Man contests, finishing second at the 1979 and 1980 World's Strongest Man, and third in 1978. Lars also won Europe's Strongest Man in 1981.

== Powerlifting ==
Lars was a European Powerlifting champion in 1980, and the Scandinavian Powerlifting champion in 1979. He competed twice at the IPF World Powerlifting Championships in 1977 finishing 6th, and in 1979 finishing third. Lars set numerous bench press world records throughout his powerlifting career, his best lift was 628 pounds (285 kg) raw in 1980 in Copenhagen, Denmark.

== Personal records ==
Powerlifting

- Squat – 380 kg (838 lb) single-ply equipment (1979 IPF Men's World Powerlifting Championships)
- Bench Press – 285 kg (628 lb) raw (1980 IPF Men's World Powerlifting Championships) (former world record)

→ Lars also held the all-time world record bench press with 278 kg (613 lb) in 1979 until it was surpassed by Bill Kazmaier.

- Deadlift – 327.5 kg (722 lb) raw (1980 EPF Men's European Powerlifting Championships)
- Total – 967.5 kg (2,133 lb) (370 + 270 + 327.5 kg (816 + 595 + 722 lb)) (1980 EPF Men's European Powerlifting Championships)

Strongman

- Deadlift (with straps) – 340 kg (750 lb) (1980 World Strongbow)

== Honours ==
- 3rd place 1978 World's Strongest Man
- 2nd place 1979 World's Strongest Man
- 2nd place 1980 World's Strongest Man
- 1st place 1981 Europe's Strongest Man

== See also ==
- List of strongmen
