= Boris Djerassi =

American hamer thrower (born 1952)

Personal information
- Native name: בוריס דריאסי
- Nickname: Dov
- Born: Boris Djerassi; February 3, 1952 (age 74) Haifa, Israel
- Education: New York University; Northeastern University
- Occupation(s): Strongman; Chiropractor

Sport
- Country: United States
- Sport: Athletics (Hammer thrower)
Medal record
Men's Hammer
Representing United States
Olympic Games
Qualified	1980 Moscow	Hammer; USA withdrew from Olympics so did not compete
NCAA
1st	1975
Penn Relays
1st	1975
IC4A Championships
1st	1975
AAU Championships
1st	1975
5th	1976
3rd	1977
1st	1978
2nd	1979
Strongman
Representing Israel
World's Strongest Man
6th	1978 World's Strongest Man

Boris (Dov) Djerassi (Hebrew: בוריס (דוב) דריאסי; born February 3, 1952) is a former athlete and strongman, based in the United States but originally from Haifa, Israel. Between 1973 and 1981 Djerassi was ranked in the United States' top-ten hammer throwers, being number one in three different years. He was selected for the Olympic team in 1980, but the United States boycotted the Moscow Games and Djerassi was unable to compete in the Olympics. He also competed at the World's Strongest Man finals.

== Early life ==
Boris Djerassi was born in Haifa, Israel, and is Jewish.

== Sporting career ==
Djerassi came to the US in the early 1970s enrolling at New York University. However, when NYU dropped their athletics program in his sophomore year he moved on to Northeastern University in 1973. Known as "Dov" (Hebrew for Bear) he won All America honors in 1975, indoors in the weight and outdoors in the hammer. In the hammer he began dominating the New England, Eastern, and eventually the national collegiate hammer event. In 1975 he defeated defending champion Pete Farmer for the NCAA crown in Provo, Utah in 1975 by just three inches. This proved to be the first of the fabled quadruple sweep, when he went on in 1975 to win the Penn Relays, the IC4A Championships, and the AAU Championships. He was the first athlete to perform this feat in one year.

Djerassi competed for the United States in the 1977 Maccabiah Games in Israel, as well as in the 1981 Maccabiah Games. He won a gold medal in the hammer throw in each Maccabiah.

In 1980, he earned one of three berths in the hammer for the 1980 Olympic Games in Moscow, but was unable to compete when the USA boycotted the games. Djerassi did however receive one of 461 Congressional Gold Medals created especially for the spurned athletes. In total, he was three time national champion and four time All-American.

In 1989 Northeastern University later inducted Boris into their Hall of Fame for his accomplishments in the sport of track and field. In 1978 Djerassi also earned an invite to the 1978 World's Strongest Man contest, only the second time it had been held. In this contest he was said to be representing Israel, despite his American citizenship.

== Later career ==
Djerassi went on to become a Track & Field coach and trained body building and track & field national champions. In 1995 he graduated from the Life Chiropractic College of Atlanta, Georgia and became a chiropractor.
