= 1969 USA Outdoor Track and Field Championships =

- Dates: June 27–29
- Host city: Miami, Florida; Dayton, Ohio; United States
- Venue: North Miami Dade College; Welcome Stadium

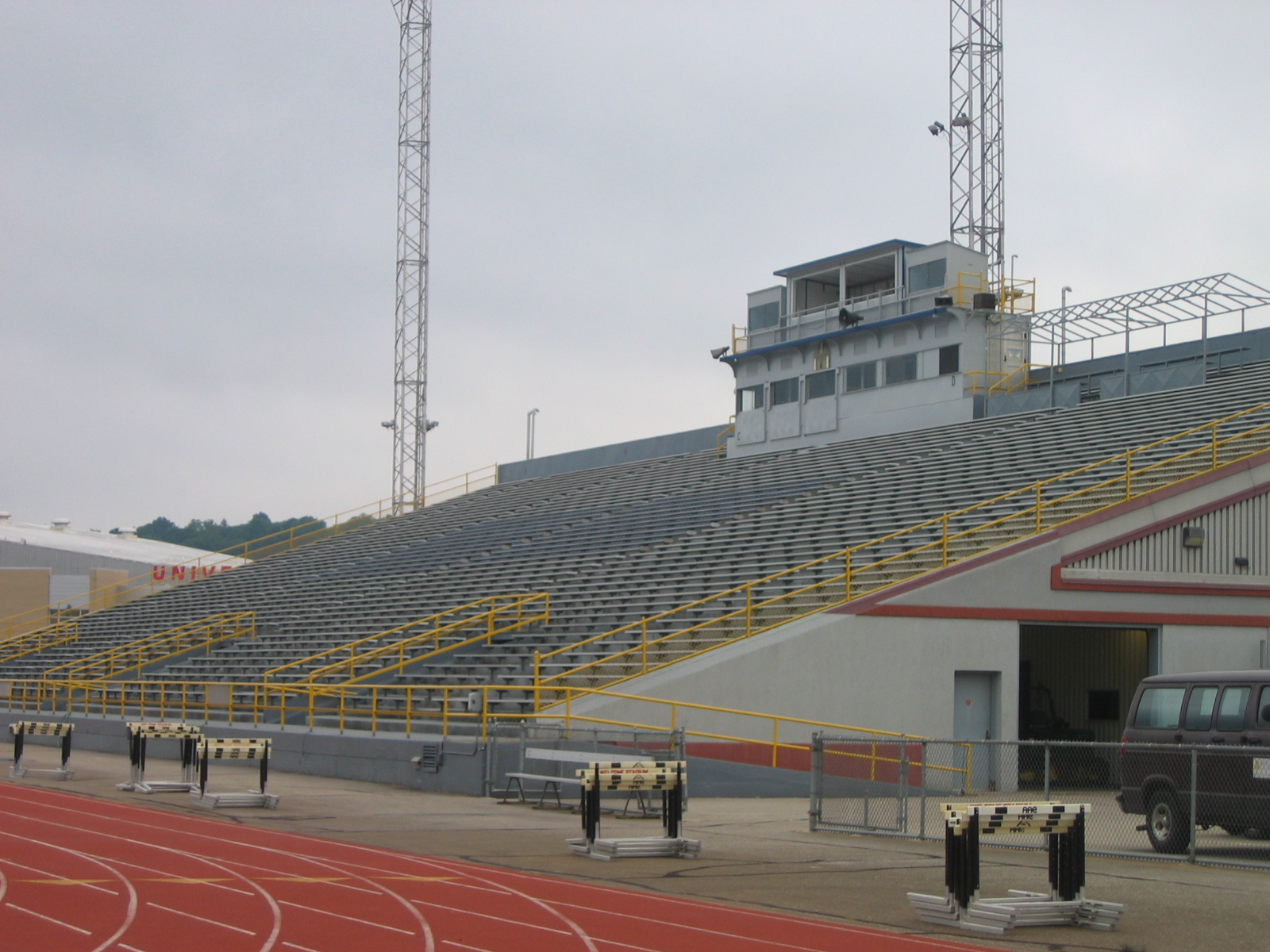
Welcome Stadium, host of the women's events

The 1969 USA Outdoor Track and Field Championships men's competition took place on the new all weather running track on the north campus of Miami Dade College in the Westview area near Miami, Florida. The women's division held their championships separately at Welcome Stadium in Dayton, Ohio. The Marathon championships were at the Western Hemisphere Marathon, in Culver City, California.

Most events were held over imperial distances.

== Results ==
=== Men track events ===
Event	Gold		Silver		Bronze	
100 yards	Ivory Crockett	9.3	John Carlos	9.3	Charles Greene	9.4
220 yards	John Carlos	20.2 MRy	Thomas Randolph	20.7	Ben Vaughan	20.7
440 yards	Lee Evans	45.6	Tommie Turner	46.0	Jim Kemp	46.3
880 yards	Byron Dyce Jamaica; Juris Luzins	1.46.6; 1.46.7	Felix Johnson	1.47.0	John Perry	1.47.8
Mile	Martin Liquori	3.59.5	John Mason	4.00.0	Sam Bair	4.00.2
3 Miles	Tracy Smith	13.18.4	Gerry Lindgren	13.18.4	Juan Maximo Martinez Mexico; Steve Prefontaine	13.35.6; 13.43.0
6 Miles	Jack Bacheler	28.12.2	Juan Maximo Martinez Mexico; Kenneth Moore	28.12.6; 28.46.4	Frank Shorter	28.52.0
Marathon	Tom Heinonen	2.24.43	Jack Leydig	2.28.52	Dave Waco	2.30.07
120 yard hurdles	Leon Coleman	13.42	Willie Davenport	13.42	Ervin Hall	13.43
440 yard hurdles	Ralph Mann	50.1	Nick Lee	50.3	Carl Wood	50.6
3000 meters steeplechase	Michael Manley	8.36.6	Robert Price	8.37.8	Barry Brown	8.49.0
2 miles walk	Ron Laird	13:31.6 NR	Jim Hanley	14:13.3	Steven Hayden	14:21.8

=== Men field events ===
Event	Gold		Silver		Bronze	
High jump	Otis Burrell	2.16 m (7 ft 1 in)	Dick Fosbury	2.13 m (6 ft 11 3/4 in)	Reynaldo Brown	2.13 m (6 ft 11 3/4 in)
Pole vault	Bob Seagren	5.33 m (17 ft 5 3/4 in)	John Pennel	5.18 m (16 ft 11 3/4 in)	Casey Carrigan	5.18 m (16 ft 11 3/4 in)
Long jump	Bob Beamon	8.20 m (26 ft 10 3/4 in)	Stan Whitley	8.04 m (26 ft 4 1/2 in)	Jerry Proctor	7.97 m (26 ft 1 3/4 in)
Triple jump	John Craft	16.08 m (52 ft 9 in)	Norm Tate	16.01 m (52 ft 6 1/4 in)	Darrell Horn	15.89 m (52 ft 1 1/2 in)
Shot put	Neal Steinhauer	20.52 m (67 ft 3 3/4 in)	Randy Matson	20.28 m (66 ft 6 1/4 in)	Karl Salb	19.90 m (65 ft 3 1/4 in)
Discus Throw	Jon Cole	63.65 m (208 ft 9 in) MR	Jay Silvester	63.63 m (208 ft 9 in)	Gary Carlsen	62.46 m (204 ft 11 in)
Hammer throw	Tom Gage	69.62 m (228 ft 4 in)	George Frenn	69.24 m (227 ft 1 in)	Harold Connolly	67.89 m (222 ft 8 in)
Javelin throw	Mark Murro	86.64 m (284 ft 3 in) MR	Roger Collins	82.01 m (269 ft 0 in)	Frank Covelli	79.96 m (262 ft 4 in)
Pentathlon	Dave Merkowitz	3442 pts				
All-around decathlon	Brian Murphy	7923 pts				
Decathlon	Bill Toomey	7818	Rick Sloan	7465	Jeff Bannister	7383

=== Women track events ===
Event	Gold		Silver		Bronze	
100 yards	Barbara Ferrell	10.7	Iris Davis	10.7	Mildrette Netter	10.7
220 yards	Barbara Ferrell	23.8	Pamela Greene	24.4	Molly Hence	24.6
440 yards	Kathy Hammond	54.4	Jarvis Scott	55.0	Esther Story	55.2
880 yards	Madeline Manning	2.11.1	Nancy Shafer	2.12.5	Cheryl Toussaint	2.05.1
1500 meters	Doris Heritage	4:27.3	Francie Larrieu	4:32.8	Vicki Foltz	4:33.5
100 meters hurdles	Chi Cheng; Taiwan; Mamie Rallins	13.4; 14.0	Jan Glotzer	14.0	Cheryl Rogers	14.2

=== Women field events ===
Event	Gold		Silver		Bronze	
High jump	Eleanor Montgomery	5 ft 11 in (1.8 m) AR	Deborah Brill Canada; Audrey Reid Jamaica; Brenda Simpson	1.73 m (5 ft 8 in); 1.70 m (5 ft 6 3/4 in); 1.70 m (5 ft 6 3/4 in)	Diane Waters	1.67 m (5 ft 5 1/2 in)
Long jump	Willye White	6.01 m (19 ft 8 1/2 in)	Martha Watson	5.93 m (19 ft 5 1/4 in)	Brenda Eisler Canada; Barbara Emerson	5.85 m (19 ft 2 1/4 in); 5.68 m (18 ft 7 1/2 in)
Shot put	Lynn Graham	14.93 m (48 ft 11 3/4 in)	Maren Seidler	14.81 m (48 ft 7 in)	Beth Smith	13.71 m (44 ft 11 3/4 in)
Discus Throw	Carol Moseke	50.98 m (167 ft 3 in)	Ranee Kletchka	47.65 m (156 ft 3 in)	Nancy Norberg	45.67 m (149 ft 10 in)
Javelin throw	Kathy Schmidt	54.05 m (177 ft 3 in)	Barbara Friedrich	53.08 m (174 ft 1 in)	Sherry Calvert	52.78 m (173 ft 1 in)
Pentathlon	Jan Glotzer	4544	Dianne Spangler Canada; Kathy Hamblin	4400; 4318	Judy Durham	4302

== See also ==
- United States Olympic Trials (track and field)
