= 1984 World's Strongest Man =

Strongman competition in 1984

Competition information
- Dates: 23-24 January 1985
- Location: Mora
- Country: Sweden
- Athletes participating: 8
- Nations participating: 8

Champion(s)
- (Iceland) Jón Páll Sigmarsson

The 1984 World's Strongest Man was the eighth edition of World's Strongest Man and was won by Jón Páll Sigmarsson from Iceland. It was his first title after finishing second the previous year. Ab Wolders from the Netherlands finished second and, 1983 champion Geoff Capes from the United Kingdom finished third. The contest was held at Mora, Sweden.

== Final results ==
#	Name	Nationality	Pts
1	Jon Pall Sigmarsson	Iceland	57.5
2	Ab Wolders	Netherlands	51.5
3	Geoff Capes	United Kingdom	49
4	Rudolph Kuester	West Germany	34
4	Dave Waddington	United States	34
6	Dan Poulin	Canada	22
7	Yngve Gustavsson	Sweden	21.5
8	Pius Ochieng	Kenya	18.5

Preceded by 1983 World's Strongest Man	1984 World's Strongest Man	Succeeded by 1985 World's Strongest Man
