= 1982 World's Strongest Man =

Strongman competition in 1982

Competition information
- Dates: 1982
- Venue: Six Flags Magic Mountain
- Location: Santa Clarita, California
- Country: United States
- Athletes participating: 10
- Nations participating: 3

Champion(s)
- (United States) Bill Kazmaier

The 1982 World's Strongest Man was the sixth edition of World's Strongest Man and was won by Bill Kazmaier from the United States. It was his third title in a row. Tom Magee from Canada finished second and John Gamble from the United States finished third. The contest was held at the Magic Mountain in California.

The World's Strongest Man was held in the United States for the sixth consecutive year; the competition did not return there until 1997.

== Events ==
There were ten events in the competition:

- Truck pull – winner: Bill Kazmaier 37 s (Notable that Geoff Capes improved time from 46 s to 38 s by moving to Kazmaier's lane.)
- Overhead log lift (rough-hewn log) – winner: Bill Kazmaier 370lbs
- Weight toss (56lbs weight over bar throw) – winner: Bill Kazmaier 17 feet
- Steel bar bend – winner: Geoff Capes (only one to bend 11/16" to 5 inch distance)
- Caber toss – winner: Dave Waddington 40'3"
- Barrel load (12 barrels each 167 lbs.) – winner: Tom Magee 73 s
- Battery hold (65 lbs. at arm's length) – winner: John Gamble 56.7 s
- Cement block squat (Smith machine squat) – tie: Tom Magee, Ernie Hackett, and Dave Waddington 955 lbs.
- Silver dollar deadlift (18" off the floor with straps allowed) tie: Bill Kazmaier and Ernie Hackett 1055lbs
- Sumo challenge – winner: Curt Marsh

== Final results ==
#	Name	Nationality	Pts
1	Bill Kazmaier	United States	91
2	Tom Magee	Canada	78
3	John Gamble	United States	69.5
4	Geoff Capes	United Kingdom	67
5	Ernie Hackett	United States	65.5
6	Curt Marsh	United States	64
7	Dave Waddington	United States	58
8	Bill Dunn	United States	40.5
9	Jim Hough	United States	36.5
10	Ross Browner	United States	35

Source: theworldsstrongestman.com

Preceded by 1981 World's Strongest Man	1982 World's Strongest Man	Succeeded by 1983 World's Strongest Man
