= Cleve Dean =

American arm wrestler and strongman (1953–2011)

Personal information
- Born: December 15, 1953 Pavo, Georgia, US
- Died: May 10, 2011 (aged 57)
- Occupations: Armwrestler, Strongman
- Height: 6 ft 7 in (201 cm)
- Weight: 465 lb (211 kg)
Medal record
Strongman
Representing United States
World's Strongest Man
6th	1979 World's Strongest Man
9th	1980 World's Strongest Man

Luther Cleve Dean (December 15, 1953 – May 10, 2011) was an American farmer, professional arm wrestler and strongman from Pavo, Georgia.

== Early life ==
Dean grew up on a family farm, raising hogs and harvesting cotton and tobacco, which moulded a strong work ethic and formidable physical strength. As a teenager, he carried 100 lb (45 kg) bags of feeds to the hog pens and already weighed 325 lb (147 kg) at the age of 21. He was also reported to have lifted the rear end of their seven-ton John Deere tractor for fun.

At the age of 22, while working on the farm he suffered a severe back injury, which crushed and fused his 4th and 5th Lumbar vertebrae. It reduced his mobility and led to a rapid weight gain to 400 lb (181 kg).

== Armwrestling career ==
Dean was proficient both right and left handed. He started his career in the mid 70s in local armwrestling contests and was weighing 450 lb (204 kg), dwarfing his opponents. He entered his first tournament in 1977 where he emerged overall runner-up. In 1978 he won world wrist wrestling championship without losing a single match.

On a supermatch which was held on 15 November 1978 at Silver Slipper casino in Las Vegas, Dean who weighed 480 lb (218 kg) defeated the 6 ft 5 in, 245 lb (111 kg) undefeated world champion Virgil Arciero, 2–0 to become the undisputed king of the table.

Throughout his career he won around 90 championships, including supermatches against Virgil Arciero, Dan Mason, Rick Zumwalt and many others, and many championship titles including AAA sit-down national title, WAF world title, Yukon Jack world title among others multiple times. It was said that during a promotional event in 1983, Dean took on about 500 men off the street who came one after the other and nobody lasted a full second against him.

Dean enjoyed eight straight years as the undefeated armwrestling world champion and was defeated only a very few times during his entire career, including by John Brzenk and Scott Norton.

He played a famous cameo appearance in Sylvester Stallone's Over the Top (1987).

== Strongman career ==
Following an impressing armwrestling dominance, Dean was invited to compete at the 1979 World's Strongest Man and 1980 World's Strongest Man competitions where he finished 6th and 9th respectively irrespective of the disadvantage he had in moving events due to his reduced mobility resulted from his back injury.

== Physical stats ==
- Height – 6 ft 7 in (2.01 m)
- Weight – 415–590 lb (188–268 kg)

→ Dean's heaviest weight was according to Lori Cole, the Over the Top promoter and female world armwresting champion who witnessed him being weighed using a Toledo scale during Over the Top finals on 26 July 1986

- Upper Arm – 23 in (58.4 cm)
- Forearm – 18 in (45.7 cm)
- Wrist – 10.25 in (26.0 cm)
- Hand length (from wrist to the tip of the middle finger) – 9.25 in (23.5 cm) (right hand) and 8.5 in (21.6 cm) (left hand)
- Hand width – 6 in (15.2 cm) (right hand)
- Thumb thickness – 1.625 in (4.13 cm) (right hand)

→ Dean's hand measurements were according to Neil Robinson

== Personal life ==
Dean was a devoted family man. He was married to his wife Ruth and together had three children: Shannon, Terri and Leann.

He loved working on his farm and ran a business selling mobile homes.

== Death ==
Dean died on 10 May 2011, after suffering a heart attack.
