= 1980 World's Strongest Man =

Strongman competition in 1980

Competition information
- Dates: 1980
- Venue: Vernon Valley/Great Gorge Resort
- Location: Vernon, New Jersey
- Country: United States
- Athletes participating: 10
- Nations participating: 5

Champion(s)
- (United States) Bill Kazmaier

The 1980 World's Strongest Man was the fourth edition of World's Strongest Man and was won by Bill Kazmaier from the United States. It was his first title after finishing third the previous year. Lars Hedlund from Sweden finished second after finishing second the previous year, and Geoff Capes from the United Kingdom finished third.

Defending champion Don Reinhoudt was forced to retire from the competition due to injury in his final World's Strongest Man.

The contest was held in the United States for the fourth consecutive year, at the Vernon Valley/Great Gorge Resort in Vernon, New Jersey.

== Events ==
There were a total of 10 different events used in the competition:

- Overhead Log lift (wooden log) – Winner Bill Kazmaier & Lars Hedlund 346lbs
- Weight toss (56lbs weight over bar throw) – Winner Bishop Dolegiewicz 17 feet
- Truck pull (16200lbs truck pull over 100foot course in heats) – Winner Cleve Dean
- Engine race (800lbs over 150feet uphill course) – Winner Bill Kazmaier in 14:40sec
- Steel bar bend – Winner Bill Kazmaier (only one that finished bending the two ends 5inch together)
- Fridge Carry (420lbs fridge over 100foot uphill course) – Winner Geoff Capes in 10:72sec
- Girl Lift (Squat on a smith machine with Playboy Girls on top) – Winner Bill Kazmaier 934lbs
- Silver Dollar Deadlift (18" off the floor with straps allowed) Winner Bill Kazmaier 956lbs
- Battery hold – Winner Jerry Hannan
- tug of war (between the four best competitors) – Winner Bill Kazmaier

== Final results ==
The American Bill Kazmaier dominated the competition by winning 6 events, getting two second places, one third and one fourth place: He tied for first in the Log lift, together with Lars Hedlund. He won the engine race, the steel bar bend, the Girl Squat lift, the Silver Dollar Deadlift and the final tug of war. He came in second in the weight toss and the fridge Carry. He took third in the battery hold and got fourth in the truck pull.

#	Name	Nationality	Log Lift	56lb Toss	Truck Pull	Engine Race	Refrigerator Race	Bar Bend	Girl Lift	Deadlift	Battery Hold	Tug of War	Pts
1	Bill Kazmaier	United States	9.5	9	7	10	9	10	10	10	8	20	102.5
2	Lars Hedlund	Sweden	9.5	6	6	8	8	8	9	7.5	7	5	74
3	Geoff Capes	United Kingdom	5.5	8	8	9	10	9	4	3	3	10	69.5
4	Bishop Dolegiewicz	Canada	5.5	10	4	7	7	6	6.5	5	5	0	56
5	Jerry Hannan	United States	7.5	7	1	1	2	3	6.5	7.5	10	-	45.5
6	Larry Kidney	United States	3.5	4	5	4	3	2	8	9	6	-	44.5
7	Superstar Billy Graham	United States	2	3	2	3	4	5	4	5	9	-	37
8	Gerard Du Prie	Netherlands	3.5	1	3	5	6	4	4	5	4	-	35.5
9	Cleve Dean	United States	1	2	10	2	5	7	2	2	2	-	33
10	Don Reinhoudt	United States	7.5	5	9	6	DNS	DNS	DNS	DNS	DNS	-	27.5 (injured)

Preceded by 1979 World's Strongest Man	1980 World's Strongest Man	Succeeded by 1981 World's Strongest Man
