= Dave Waddington =

Former powerlifter and strongman from Ohio, USA

- Born: May 10, 1952 (age 73); Sandusky, Ohio
- Occupation(s): Powerlifter, strongman
- Height: 6 ft 0.5 in (1.84 m)

Competition record

Strongman

Representing United States

World's Strongest Man
3rd	1981 World's Strongest Man	
7th	1982 World's Strongest Man	
4th	1984 World's Strongest Man	

Powerlifting

Representing United States

IPF World Powerlifting Championships
Disqualified	1980	

Dave Waddington is a former powerlifter and strongman from Ohio, United States. Apart from his three appearances at the World's Strongest Man finals, winning third in 1981, he is also famed as the first man to ever squat 1,000 lbs.

== Early life ==
Waddington was born on May 10, 1952, in Sandusky, Ohio. He attended Sandusky High School.

== Powerlifting career ==
Waddington competed in three World's Strongest Man contests, finishing third in the first one he entered in 1981 behind Bill Kazmaier and Geoff Capes. In 1982 he was seventh, and in 1984 was joint-fourth behind Jón Páll Sigmarsson, Ab Wolders and Capes.

As a powerlifter, Dave Waddington was briefly the super heavyweight IPF champion in 1980, but was later disqualified, the title passing to Doyle Kenady. The next year, on June 13, 1981 in Zanesville, Ohio Waddington made history by became the first man to squat over 1,000 lbs.

== Powerlifting record ==
Dave Waddington was a seven time Ohio Champion, and a four time YMCA National Champion.

1977 - A.A.U. Senior National Championship - Pan American Champion
1980 - North American Champion - Hawaiian Open Champion - 7 YMCA National Records - 6 Ohio State Records - 2 North American Records - World squat record Super heavyweight class - 959 lbs and 970 lbs.
1981 - 3rd place Strongest Man contest - First person to squat 1,000+ lbs. in competition - U.S. Invitational - Listed in the Guinness Book of World Records
1982 - American Squat Record, 909 lbs. in 275 lb class - American Total Record at 2,220 lbs. - 2nd place World's Strongest Man - Set the world record in Caber Toss
1984 - 3rd place Canada's Louis Cyr Strongest Man contest - 4th place Sweden's World's Strongest Man contest, Mora, Sweden - Set the world record in log floor lift at 507 lbs.

== Personal records ==
- Squat – 1,013 lb (459.5 kg) equipped in 80s marathon squat suit (1981)

→ But there was no official to judge the lift, hence is regarded unofficial. In 1984 Lee Moran after a duel with Waddington, squatted 1,003 lb (455 kg) and became the first person to officially squat 1,000 lb equipped.

- Floor press (log / no handles) – 507 lb (230 kg) (1984 World's Strongest Man) (World Record)

== Personal life ==
Waddington resides in Sandusky with his wife and son. He is a custodian with the Sandusky City Schools, and was elected Sandusky City Commissioner in 2003 and served two terms before being termed out in 2011. He was re-elected city commissioner in 2015. Waddington is a community activist, avid golfer, and known "Cheesehead", a term sports writers and fans use to describe Green Bay Packers enthusiasts.

== See also ==
- List of strongmen
