= Don Reinhoudt =

American weightlifter and strongman (1945–2023)

Personal information
- Born: Donald C. Reinhoudt; March 6, 1945 Brocton, New York, U.S.
- Died: July 3, 2023 (aged 78) Pomfret, New York, U.S.
- Occupation(s): Powerlifter, strongman
- Height: 6 ft 3 in (1.91 m)
Medal record
Strongman
Representing United States
World's Strongest Man
2nd	1978 World's Strongest Man
1st	1979 World's Strongest Man
9th	1980 World's Strongest Man
Powerlifting
Representing United States
IPF World Powerlifting Championships
1st	1973	+110kg
1st	1974	+110kg
1st	1975	+110kg
1st	1976	+110kg
AAU US National Powerlifting Championships
1st	1974	+110kg
1st	1975	+110kg
1st	1976	+110kg
AAU World Powerlifting Championships
3rd	1972	+110kg

Donald C. Reinhoudt (March 5, 1945 – July 3, 2023) was an American powerlifter and strongman. He won the IPF World Powerlifting Superheavyweight Championship four consecutive times (1973–1976), and won the World's Strongest Man in 1979.

Widely considered to be one of the greatest powerlifters of all time, Reinhoudt set over forty powerlifting records throughout his career and held all four of the powerlifting records in his day. His world record raw total of 2,391 pounds (1,085 kg), set in 1975, stood for 38 years.

== Athletics ==
At Fredonia High School, Reinhoudt was an All-League basketball player, an All-Western New York football player and an All-Western shot putter.

Reinhoudt began lifting weights when he was an 18-year-old defensive end at Parsons College, a small college in Iowa. He not only played college football for four years, but was also on the varsity track team.

Reinhoudt also competed in six Olympic weightlifting competitions, including the 1967 Junior Nationals.

== Powerlifting ==
After experimenting with weightlifting, Reinhoudt began powerlifting in 1969. For the young Reinhoudt, his powerlifting idols, were Jon Cole, John Kuc and Jim Williams who were the greatest pioneers of the sport.

Reinhoudt took 3rd place in his first international appearance in the open division at the inaugural 1972 AAU World Powerlifting Championships with a 2,150 lb total finishing only behind John Kuc and Jim Williams. He went on to finish in 1st place 4 times in a row at the World Powerlifting Championships from 1973 to 1976, also winning the United States national titles during the same span. He was the only Super Heavyweight to hold IPF World Records in all three lifts (squat, bench press, deadlift) as well as in the Total simultaneously. He was also thought to be the first man to break the 2,400 lb barrier, with a 2,420 lb total (however it was later downgraded with the actual weight of 2391 pounds or 1084.5 kg), achieved in 1975. This Total of 2391 lb stood until 2013 as the highest powerlifting total ever achieved without supportive equipment (raw), making Reinhoudt effectively one of the strongest men in the history of powerlifting.

Reinhoudt had three meets, in which he totaled more than 2350 pounds. He is also one of the few lifters ever to have squatted more than 900 pounds raw (934.5) and bench pressed in excess of 600 pounds raw (607.4). In 1976, he even attempted a 904-pound deadlift three times in official meets (including at the IPF World Championships) and pulled it up past his knees but could not lock it out completely. Had he managed it, at that time, he would have been the only lifter in history, whose name would have registered in all of the three powerlifting hall of fames for the 900 pound raw squat, 600 pound raw bench press and 900 pound deadlift. Additionally, Reinhoudt often missed other lifts only very closely, which would have been even bigger world records. For example, one year at the AAU Senior Nationals he bench pressed 620 pounds (raw) to full lockout but got two red lights for raising his toe during the lift. One time at national championships, Reinhoudt squatted 950 pounds raw without knee wraps, in only a thin Olympic belt. It didn't count, because it was deemed one inch too high - it would have been the all-time world record until June 2016.

=== Meet results ===
- 1972 AAU World Championships Bronze, +242 lb Class (Harrisburg, Pennsylvania)

Squat: 830 lb, Bench: 590 lb, Deadlift: 730 lb---Total: 2150 lb

- 1973 IPF Champion +110 kg (+242 lb) Class (Harrisburg, Pennsylvania)

Squat: 407.5 kg (899 lb), Bench: 262.5 kg (579 lb), Deadlift: 362.5 kg (799 lb)---Total 1032.5 kg (2277 lb)

- 1974 IPF Champion +110 kg (+242 lb) Class (New York City, New York)

Squat: 410 kg (904 lb), Bench: 252.5 kg (557 lb), Deadlift: 375 kg (827 lb)---Total: 1037.5 kg (2288 lb)

- 1975 IPF Champion +110 kg (+242 lb) Class (Birmingham, England)

Squat: 400 kg (882 lb), Bench: 250 kg (551 lb), Deadlift: 380 kg (838 lb)---Total: 1030 kg (2271 lb)

- 1976 IPF Champion +110 kg (+242 lb) Class (New York City, New York)

Squat: 390 kg (860 lb), Bench: 252.5 kg (557 lb), Deadlift: 372.5 kg (821 lb)---Total: 1015 kg (2238 lb)

=== Health complications and transition into Strongman ===
On November 10, 1976, after winning the IPF World Championships, Reinhoudt retired from powerlifting mainly due to the inconvenience his heavy weight caused to his health, such as shortness of breath and lack of flexibility. He quickly dropped his weight from 365 to 239 pounds in the time span of only four months. In preparation for his appearance at the 1978 World's Strongest Man, Reinhoudt competed one last time at the Eastern Open in 1977, in the 275-pound class, where he set four world records: At 264 pounds bodyweight he totalled 2000 lb (725/525/750). He never competed in powerlifting afterwards and put all his energy on lifting for the World's Strongest Man shows.

== World's Strongest Man ==
After retiring from powerlifting in 1976, Reinhoudt was invited to the 1977 World's Strongest Man contest. While being on a hardcore diet, he had just lost 125 lbs of body weight from 365 to 239. So he declined but vowed to compete in the following year. He competed in the following three competitions from 1978 to 1980. In 1978 he was leading field over the most part of the competition, but lost the final tug of war by losing balance and finishing 2nd to Bruce Wilhelm. The following year Reinhoudt won the competition in 1979, beating a young Bill Kazmaier. He was forced to withdraw from the 1980 World's Strongest Man competition after tearing his biceps and left hamstring, which proved to be career ending injuries. He retired from competition in August 1980, shortly after this contest.

== Personal records ==
=== Powerlifting ===
performed in official powerlifting full meets

- Squat – 934.5 lb (423.9 kg) raw without knee wraps

→ former IPF world record in SHW class (+regardless of weight class) for 19 years (stood until Mark Henry's 948 lb (430 kg) in 1995)
→ former all-time world record highest raw squat without knee wraps for 39 years (stood until Ray Williams's 938 lb (425 kg) in 2015)

- Bench press – 607.5 lb (275.6 kg) raw

→ former IPF world record in SHW class (+regardless of weight class) (stood until Wayne Bouvier's 610 lb (277 kg))

- Deadlift – 885.5 lb (401.7 kg) raw

→ former all-time and IPF world record deadlift in SHW class (+regardless of weight class) for 6 years (stood until Bill Kazmaier's 886 lb (402 kg) in 1981)

- Total – 2,391.5 lb (1,085 kg) (904.5 + 601.5 + 885.5 lb (410 + 273 + 402 kg)) raw without wraps (2,420 lb @357 lb, which later weighed out at 2,391.5 lb)

→ former IPF and all-time world record total in SHW class (+regardless of weight class) for 6 years (stood until Bill Kazmaier's 2,425 lb (1,100 kg) in 1981)

=== Weightlifting ===
Reinhoudt did Olympic lifting in his younger years when he weighed approximately 240 pounds

- Snatch – 260 lb (118 kg)
- Clean and Jerk – 370 lb (168 kg)
- Total – 630 lb (286 kg)

=== Strongman ===
- Girl lift (Squat on Smith Machine/ not to parallel depth) – 1,000 lb (454 kg) (1979 World's Strongest Man) (world record)
- Car lift Deadlift – 2,550 lb (1,157 kg) (lifting two tires off the ground) (1979 World's Strongest Man)
- Barrel overhead press – 300 lb (136 kg) (lifting barrel of the ground to arm's length) (1979 World's Strongest Man)

=== Combined lifts ===
- Combined official Supertotal (official weightlifting total + official powerlifting total):
  630 lb (286 kg) + 2,391 lb (1,085 kg) = 3,021 lb (1,370 kg)
- Career aggregate Supertotal (Individual 5 lift PR weightlifting & powerlifting total):
  260 lb (118 kg) + 370 lb (168 kg) + 934.5 lb (424 kg) + 607.5 lb (276 kg) + 885.5 lb (402 kg) = 3,057.5 lb (1,387 kg)

== Measurements ==
measurements without exercising or "pumping up"

- Height: 6-foot-3-inches to 6-foot-4-inches (190 to 193 cm)
- Weight: up to 380 pounds (172.5 kg)
- Neck size: 22 inches (56 cm)
- Chest: 60 inches (152,5 cm)
- Upper arm: 22 3/4 inches (58 cm)
- Forearm: 18 1/2 inches (47 cm)
- Thighs: 34 inches (86,5 cm)
- Shoe size: 15 EEE
- According to Terry Todd Don Reinhoudt is one of the biggest world-class lifters in Olympic or powerlifting history.

== Recognitions ==
- International Powerlifting Federation Hall of Fame - Class of 1980
- World Powerlifting Hall of Fame - Class of 1998
- Greater Buffalo Sports Hall of Fame - Class of 2005
- United States Powerlifting Hall of Fame
- Chautauqua County
- Chautauqua Sports Hall of Fame

== Personal life ==
Reinhoudt was married to Pam and had two children from a previous marriage; Molly and Ben. He was a Christian. After obtaining a degree in finance, Reinhoudt worked as an accountant in his parents' accounting firm and later was the director of the Chautauqua County Youth Bureau, a position he held until his retirement. In his position as Youth Bureau Director, Reinhoudt gave various motivational speeches to youth in Western New York, often including minor feats of strength in his presentations, such as picking people up with his teeth, driving nails through boards with his hands, and tearing license plates and phone books.

Reinhoudt died on July 3, 2023, at the age of 78 in a one-vehicle crash in the Town of Pomfret in Chautauqua County.

== See also ==
- Jim Williams
- John Kuc
- Jon Cole
- Bill Kazmaier
