= Tom Magee =

Canadian strongman, powerlifter and professional wrestler (born 1958)

- Born: July 1, 1958 (age 68); Winnipeg, Manitoba, Canada
- Occupations: Strongman, Powerlifting, Professional wrestling, actor
- Years active: 1982–1990 (strongman); 1985–1990 (wrestler); 1990–1993 (actor); 1981–1983 (powerlifter)
- Height: 6 ft 4.5 in (1.94 m)
- Title: Strongest Man in the World

Competition record

Strongman

Representing Canada

World's Strongest Man
2nd	1982 World's Strongest Man
4th	1983 World's Strongest Man
5th	1985 World's Strongest Man

Defi Mark 10 Canadian Nationals
1st	1988

Le Defi Mark Ten Challenge, International
1st	1984
1st	1985
1st	1986
3rd	1988

Powerlifting

Representing Canada

IPF World Powerlifting Championships
2nd	1981	125kg
1st	1982	+125kg

Canadian National Powerlifting Championships
1st	1981	125kg
1st	1982	125kg

Thomas Magee (born July 1, 1958) is a Canadian former world champion powerlifter and strongman competitor from Winnipeg, Manitoba. He is also a former bodybuilder and competed in professional wrestling from 1985 to 1990.

== Strength sports career ==
=== Powerlifting (1981–1983) ===
Magee became Canadian National Powerlifting Champion in 1981 and 1982. In 1981, Tom placed second at the IPF World Powerlifting Championship in the 125 kg weight class. He totaled 927.5 kg (squatted 355 kg, bench pressed 235 kg, and deadlifted 337.5 kg). At that same competition, Magee placed ahead of future World's Strongest Man, Jon Pall Sigmarsson.

In 1982, he won the IPF World Powerlifting Championships in Munich, Germany in the +125 kg super heavyweight division. He totaled 942.5 kg (squatted 362.5 kg, bench pressed 235 kg, and deadlifted 345 kg). The second place finisher, Wayne Bouvier, had the same total, but Magee won by lighter body weight.

Tom starred in a documentary film chronicling his training and victory at the 1982 IPF World Championships entitled Tom Magee: Man of Iron. Magee was originally planning on competing in the 125 kg heavyweight division, but decided last minute to move up to the 125+ kg super heavyweight class. Magee weighed in at just 1 pound over the weight limit at 276 lbs and was the lightest man in the weight class.

=== Strongman (1982–1990) ===
Magee placed second in the 1982 World's Strongest Man. Magee was the only Canadian to have reached this position until Mitchell Hooper won the 2023 World's Strongest Man title. Magee then placed fourth in the 1983 World's Strongest Man and fifth at the 1985 World's Strongest Man competitions. Magee set a then-world record with a 535 kilograms (1,179 lb) partial deadlift from 18" off the floor during the 1983 World's Strongest Man competition. He also won the Le Defi Mark Ten Challenge International three consecutive times, from 1984 to 1986.

== Professional wrestling career ==
=== Stampede Wrestling and Japan (1985–1986) ===
Magee also had a brief career as a professional wrestler from 1985 to 1990, wrestling for the World Wrestling Federation (WWF) and in Japan. Magee was primarily trained by Stu Hart in Stampede Wrestling, where he wrestled in 1985.

Magee was given the nickname "Mega Man" and named third runner-up for the Pro Wrestling Illustrated Rookie of the Year in 1986, which was won by Lex Luger.

=== World Wrestling Federation (1986–1989) ===
Magee was signed by the WWF shortly thereafter. He defeated Bret Hart on October 7, 1986 in Rochester, New York at a television taping. The infamous match, a carry job by Hart, reportedly impressed WWF chairman Vince McMahon; the tape was thought to have been lost, as the WWE could not locate it in its vault, but was uncovered over 30 years later. On May 13, 2019, the WWE Network aired a short documentary special entitled Holy Grail: The Search for WWE's Most Infamous Lost Match which detailed the legend behind the match, the recovery of the tape, and even featured a short interview with Magee himself interspersed with clips of his short career in the then-WWF.

After the Hart dark match, Magee began wrestling on C-level house shows in January 1987, facing Terry Gibbs, Barry O, and Frenchy Martin. He remained undefeated through the winter and spring, but the WWF gradually cooled on Magee.

Magee would be seen only sporadically afterwards. He wrestled a handful of house shows in Canada in January 1988, defeating Iron Mike Sharpe. On December 6, 1988 Magee returned and faced Arn Anderson at a WWF Superstars of Wrestling taping in Daytona Beach, Florida, winning via countout. Magee made a heel turn in the spring of 1989, wrestling as "MegaMan Magee". In April he was managed by Jimmy Hart at a Superstars of Wrestling tapings. As a heel, he then faced Tim Horner in a series of house shows.

=== Return to Japan (1988) ===
In March 1988, Magee returned to All Japan Pro Wrestling where worked until April of that year.

=== New Zealand (1990) ===
Magee's final WWF action came on a joint WWF / Arena Wrestling Alliance tour of New Zealand in April 1990, where he defeated Royal Viking in multiple encounters.

== Acting ==
Magee left wrestling quietly in 1990 and appeared in several movies in 1990 and 1991, most notably a film titled Stone Cold.

Later, Magee worked as a trainer at the world famous Gold's Gym in Venice Beach, California.

== Assault ==
In May 15, 2018, Magee was the victim of an assault in front of his home in Mar Vista, California. He suffered a broken jaw, broken eye socket and concussion. According to a neighbor who was an eyewitness, six men who were involved in the assault were kicking him, and punching him in the face and in the head.

== Personal records ==
=== Powerlifting ===
performed in official powerlifting full meets, aged 24, in single-ply equipment

- Squat – 375 kg (827 lb) in 80s marathon squat suit (1983 CPU British Columbia Championships)
- Bench press – 260 kg (573 lb) (1983 CPU British Columbia Championships)
- Deadlift – 365 kg (805 lb) (1983 CPU British Columbia Championships)
- Total – 1,000 kg (2,205 lb) (375 + 260 + 365 kg (827 + 573 + 805 lb)) (1983 CPU British Columbia Championships)

=== Strongman ===
- Cheese Deadlift (Silver dollar setup) – 535 kg (1,179 lb) (1983 World's Strongest Man) (Former World Record)
- Cement block Squat (on smith machine/ not to parallel depth) – 433 kg (955 lb) (1982 World's Strongest Man)
