= Alberto Pigaiani =

Italian weightlifter (1928–2003)

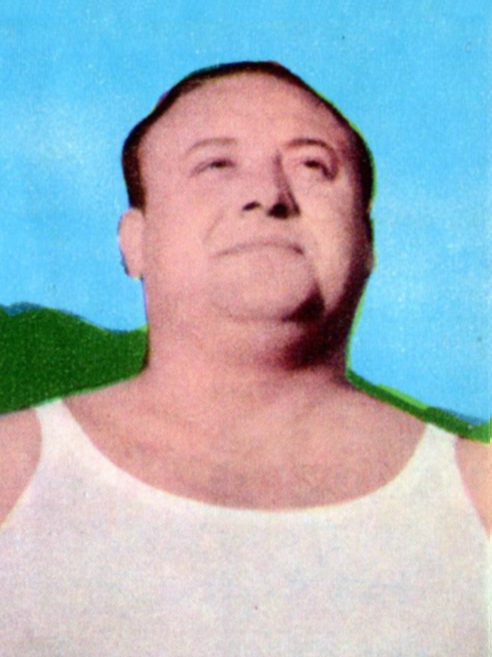

Personal information
- Born: 12 July 1928 Milan, Italy
- Died: 15 June 2003 (aged 74) Milan, Italy
- Height: 1.74 m (5 ft 9 in)
- Weight: 130–132 kg (287–291 lb)

Sport
- Sport: Weightlifting
- Club: S.G. Pro Patria, Milan
Medal record
Representing Italy
Olympic Games
Bronze medal – third place	1956 Melbourne	heavyweight
World Championships
Bronze medal – third place	1957 Tehran	+90 kg
European Championships
Silver medal – second place	1956 Helsinki	+90 kg
Silver medal – second place	1958 Stockholm	+90 kg
Bronze medal – third place	1960 Milan	+90 kg

Alberto Pigaiani (12 July 1928 – 15 June 2003) was an Italian heavyweight weightlifter. He competed at the 1956 and 1960 Summer Olympics and finished in third and seventh place, respectively. Between 1956 and 1960 he won four medals at the world and European championships.
