= John Kuc =

American powerlifter

- Born: 1947 (age 78–79) (United States) Kingston, Pennsylvania
- Occupation: powerlifting
- Height: 6 ft 0 in (1.83 m)

Competition record

Powerlifting

Representing United States

IPF World Powerlifting Championships
1st	1974	110kg
1st	1979	110kg
1st	1980	110kg

AAU World Powerlifting Championships
3rd	1971	+110kg
1st	1972	+110kg

AAU US National Powerlifting Championships
1st	1974	110kg

USPF National Powerlifting Championships
1st	1979	110kg
1st	1980	110kg

John Kuc is an American retired powerlifter. During the 1970s and 1980s, he set numerous powerlifting national and world records, won three International Powerlifting Federation (IPF) world championships and numerous national championships.

Although Jon Cole squatted 905 pounds and totaled 2,370 pounds (later weighed out at 2,364) a bit earlier in a AAU local meet in Phoenix, Arizona on October 28, 1972, Kuc became known as the first man to squat over 900 and total 2,300 pounds in a major international competition with a more strict judging at the AAU World Powerlifting Championships on November 11, 1972 by squatting 905 pounds and totaling 2,350 pounds (raw with ace bandages), which was one of the highest raw totals ever achieved.

== Personal Records ==
done in official Powerlifting full meets

- Squat - 905.0 lbs (410.5 kg) raw with ace-bandage knee wraps @ 322.25 lb. bodyweight
- Bench press - 600 lbs (272.2 kg) raw @ 322.25 lb. bodyweight
- Deadlift - 870.8 lbs (395.0 kg) raw @ 242.5 lb. bodyweight
- Total - 2350 lbs (905-600-845) / 1065.9 kg (410.5-272.2-383.3) raw with ace-bandage wraps @ 322.25 lb. bodyweight

Career aggregate total (best official lifts): 2375.8 lbs (905 + 600 + 870.8)

== See also ==
- Jim Williams
- Jon Cole
- Don Reinhoudt
