= 1978 World's Strongest Man =

Strongman competition in 1978

Competition information
- Dates: 1978
- Venue: Universal Studios
- Location: Los Angeles, California
- Country: United States
- Athletes participating: 10
- Nations participating: 4

Champion(s)
- (United States) Bruce Wilhelm

The 1978 World's Strongest Man was the second edition of World's Strongest Man and was won by Bruce Wilhelm from the United States. It was his second title. Don Reinhoudt also from the United States finished second, and Lars Hedlund from Sweden third. The contest was held at the Universal Studios, California.

== Final results ==
| # | Name | Nationality | Pts |
|---|---|---|---|
| 1 | Bruce Wilhelm | United States | 64.33 |
| 2 | Don Reinhoudt | United States | 58 |
| 3 | Lars Hedlund | Sweden | 38.9 |
| 4 | Jon Kolb | United States | 23.4 |
| 5 | Gus Rethwisch | United States | 16.73 |
| 6 | Boris Djerassi | Israel | 15.23 |
| 7 | Brian Oldfield | United States | 12 |
| 8 | Ivan Putski | Poland | 5.4 |
| 9 | John Matuszak | United States | 4 |
| 10 | Jack Wright | United States | 0 |

| Preceded by 1977 World's Strongest Man | 1978 World's Strongest Man | Succeeded by 1979 World's Strongest Man |
