= Bill Kazmaier =

American strongman (born 1953)

William Kazmaier
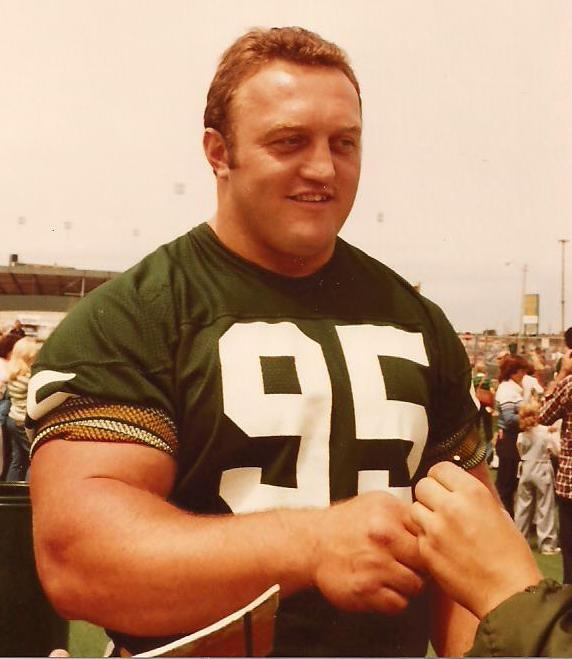
- Kazmaier at Green Bay Packers training camp in 1981.
- Born: December 30, 1953 (age 72); Burlington, Wisconsin, U.S.
- Other name: Kaz
- Occupations: Strongman, powerlifter, wrestler, sports commentator
- Years active: 1978–1992
- Height: 6 ft 2.5 in (189 cm)
- Children: 1
- Professional wrestling career
- Billed height: 6 ft 3 in (191 cm)
- Billed weight: 326 lb (148 kg)
- Billed from: Burlington, Wisconsin
- Trained by: Brad Rheingans; Verne Gagne
- Debut: 1986
- Retired: 1992

Competition record

Strongman

Representing United States

World's Strongest Man
3rd	1979 World's Strongest Man
1st	1980 World's Strongest Man
1st	1981 World's Strongest Man
1st	1982 World's Strongest Man
2nd	1988 World's Strongest Man
4th	1989 World's Strongest Man

World Muscle Power Championships
3rd	1985
1st	1988
4th	1989
4th	1990
6th	1992

Le Defi Mark Ten International
1st	1987
2nd	1990

Pure Strength
2nd	1987
1st	1988 w/Stuart Thompson
2nd	1989 w/O.D. Wilson
1st	1990 w/O.D. Wilson

World Strongman Challenge
3rd	1988
2nd	1990

Scottish Power Challenge
1st	1984
1st	1985
1st	1986
1st	1987
1st	1988
1st	1989

Strongbow Strongman
1st	1980
1st	1981

Iceland's Strongest Man
1st	1988

Powerlifting

Representing United States

IPF World Powerlifting Championships
1st	1979	+110kg
1st	1983	+125kg

USPF National Powerlifting Championships
1st	1983	+125kg

AAU National Powerlifting Championships
1st	1978 Juniors	125kg
1st	1978 Seniors	125kg
1st	1983 Seniors	+125kg

William Kazmaier (born December 30, 1953) is an American former powerlifter, strongman and professional wrestler. During his career, he set 40 world records across both powerlifting and strongman, and won two International Powerlifting Federation (IPF) World Championships and three World's Strongest Man titles.

In the 1980s, Kazmaier became famous for his claim to be "the strongest man who ever lived" by equaling and surpassing feats of strength of famous strongmen of the 20th century. He won the World Muscle Power Classic, Le Defi Mark Ten International and World Strongbow championships which were all revered for testing static strength and also became notorious for not being invited to the World's Strongest Man competition for four consecutive years.

Widely considered to be one of the greatest strength athletes of all-time, he was inducted into the International Sports Hall of Fame in 2017.

== Early career ==
Kazmaier is of German ancestry. A star athlete in high school, he played football for two years at the University of Wisconsin–Madison before dropping out in 1974 to concentrate on lifting weights at the Madison YMCA. There he learned the fundamentals of powerlifting. Kazmaier then struggled to earn a living as an oil rigger, a bouncer, and a lumberjack.

== Powerlifting career ==
At the 1978 Amateur Athletic Union (AAU) National Championships in Los Angeles, California, Kazmaier squatted 782 lb (354.7 kg), bench pressed 534 lb (242.2 kg), and deadlifted 804 lb (364.7 kg) in the 275-pound weight class, which immediately placed him in the top rank in his first national powerlifting appearance. In 1979 at age 25, he set a world record with a bench press of 622 lb (282.1 kg) on the way to winning his first IPF World Powerlifting Championship in Dayton, Ohio. His winning lifts included an 865 lb (392.4 kg) squat, the 622 lb (282.1 kg) bench press and an 804 lb (364.7 kg) deadlift for a 2,291 lb (1,039.2 kg) total. He repeated the success in 1983 by first winning the United States Powerlifting Federation (USPF) National Powerlifting Championships in July and later the IPF World Championship in November for a second time. He won this IPF World Championship despite two major injuries. He had a severe pectoral injury, from which he never recovered completely, and shortly before the IPF Championships, had torn his hip flexors in the squat.

The world record bench press by June 1979 was 612 lb (277.6 kg), held by Sweden's Lars Hedlund. Kazmaier moved the world record stepwise up from 617.3 lb (280.0 kg) in July, 1979 to 622.8 lb (282.5 kg) in November 1979 to 633.8 lb (287.5 kg) in May, 1980 and finally to 661.4 lb (300.0 kg) at the USPF West Georgia Open Powerlifting Championships, held in Columbus, Georgia on January 31, 1981. In this competition, Kazmaier officially became the first human to bench press 300 kg (661.4 lb) (raw) in an IPF-sanctioned meet (Note: Jim Williams had bench pressed 675.5 lb (306.4 kg) (raw) earlier than Kazmaier in 1972 just prior to the formation of the IPF. But his lift was performed with ace bandage elbow wraps, which were later outlawed so it wouldn't count as the official IPF world record.) and recorded his lifetime best three-lift-total of 2,425 lb (1,100.0 kg), a powerlifting world record that remained unsurpassed for more than a decade. His winning lifts were: a 925.9 lb (420.0 kg) squat, the 661.4 lb (300.0 kg) bench press and an 837.7 lb (380.0 kg) deadlift. The bench press and deadlift were done raw (unequipped), while the squat was performed with wraps and a marathon squat suit. This powerlifting performance is regarded as one of the best of all time.

In November 1981, Kazmaier became one of the few lifters in history to hold world records in three of the four powerlifting events at the same time by setting a new deadlift world record at 886 lb (401.9 kg) in competition. From 1981 onwards Kazmaier's career was affected by multiple muscle tears and injuries, preventing him from setting the bar even higher. He sustained chest, shoulder and triceps injuries, ruling out further records in the bench press.

== Strongman career ==
Kazmaier competed in six World's Strongest Man contests. In 1979 World's Strongest Man, he came in third after leading throughout much of the competition and beating powerlifting icon Don Reinhoudt in the car lift by deadlifting a 2,555 lb (1,159 kg) car. In the following years, he dominated the competitions in 1980, 1981, and 1982, winning all by significant margins. He was the first man to win the WSM title three times and to this day, remains one of only two men ever to win it three times in a row.

In his 1980 World's Strongest Man title win, Kazmaier won five of ten events and tied for first in another. He won the log lift, engine race, steel bar bend, playboy bunny squat lift, silver dollar deadlift, and the final tug of war. The runner-up in the competition Lars Hedlund, was over 28 points behind. (Note: The scoring system however was an anomaly in this contest where additional points were given for the final event (tug of war). Contrary to the standard 10 points for each event win, Kazmaier got 20 points, runner-up of the event Geoff Capes got 10 points while third place of the event and overall runner-up Lars Hedlund got only 5 points. None of the remaining athletes received a single point in this event.)

During Kazmaier's title defense at the 1981 World's Strongest Man he won the squat event with 969 lb (439.5 kg) (on a smith machine) for a world record, just after tearing his pectoralis major muscle while bending cold rolled steel bars in the bar bend event before. (Note: After this tear, he lost more than one-hundred pounds off his bench press, making his 1983 IPF world championship win all that much more significant.) Kazmaier made the iconic quote "These legs, are the strongest legs, right here!" following the performance. In the next event he went on to win the silver dollar deadlift with a 940 lb (426.4 kg) lift. After his opponent Dave Waddington failed to make the final lift, Kazmaier lifted the weight for two consecutive reps despite needing only one rep to secure the win. Of 11 events he had five wins, two second places, one third and a fourth. His wins included the log lift, deadlift, squat, loading race and engine race.

In the 1982 World's Strongest Man competition Kazmaier won the first three events. A notable performance in this WSM was his 1,055 lb (478.5 kg) joint-world record silver dollar deadlift alongwith Ernie Hackett.

Despite being the reigning 3x time champion, the organizers controversially decided not to invite Kazmaier to compete in the following four WSM competitions, with Kazmaier self-claiming the reason was because he was "too dominant". His absence cleared the way for Kazmaier's main rival, Geoff Capes, to win the title in 1983. Capes and upcoming Jón Páll Sigmarsson dominated the competition during the next several years.

He returned to the World's Strongest Man Contest in 1988, where he won three of eight events: the log press, deadlift and sack race; and took two second places including the truck pull, but was disqualified for moving his hands in the sausage forward hold, so the time was stopped prematurely. With two events to go, he was leading the field by 1 point over Jón Páll, and was the favorite to win the following Weight over bar event, in which a 56 lb (25.4 kg) weight has to be thrown over a bar. He was the reigning world record holder of this event from 1987 Pure Strength with a height of 5.34 metres (17 ft 6 in). The event took place on water with boats floating around and Kazmaier's concern about his orientation on water was borne out. Although he threw the weight way higher than the bar, he failed to get the trajectory right, failing at 4.60 metres (15 ft 1 in). Jón Páll won the event with a clearance of 5.05 metres (16 ft 7 in) and with four contestants coming in-between the two, Kazmaier was trailing Jón Páll by four points, a deficit which cost him too much to catch up at the final event McGlashen Stones, eventually emerging runner-up to Jón Páll.

In Kazmaiers' final WSM appearance at the 1989 World's Strongest Man, he severely injured his ankle in the first event and already had a ripped biceps. He came in fourth. In addition to WSM contests, Kazmaier also competed in the second and third most prestigious contests World Muscle Power Classic and Le Defi Mark Ten International alongwith several other tournaments, such as the Scottish Power Challenge, Strongbow Strongman Challenge and Pure Strength. He ended his career as a competitive strongman in 1990.

With three Worlds Strongest Man titles, Kazmaier is one of the most successful competitors in the history of the contest. Strength historian David P. Webster called him "the greatest American strength athlete of all time", and a 2008 poll of experts rated him as top superheavyweight lifter of all time and "one of the strongest men who ever lived." He was featured in Flex magazine in May 2008, in which a top ten list of the strongest men in history was published where Kazmaier was voted "the third strongest man that ever lived", just behind Mark Henry and Žydrūnas Savickas.

== Professional wrestling career ==
Inspired by Jim Thorpe, Kazmaier sought to transfer his talents to other sports, trying out for the NFL's Green Bay Packers in 1981. He also trained as a wrestler with Verne Gagne and Brad Rheingans, and entered professional wrestling in 1986, with a WWF match in Calgary, Alberta on November 10, 1986, defeating David Barbie. During the 1980s, he had wrestled for promotions such as Stampede Wrestling in Canada and Continental Championship Wrestling in America. He would also wrestle for Fighting Network RINGS in Japan in early 1991.

His biggest national exposure came when he debuted for World Championship Wrestling in the summer of 1991. He received several shots at Lex Luger's WCW World Heavyweight Championship but failed to win the title. He also briefly teamed with Rick Steiner, only to lose to The Enforcers in a tournament final for the WCW World Tag Team Championship. At Halloween Havoc 1991, in Chattanooga, he beat Oz by submission. At the 1991 Starrcade Battlebowl: The Lethal Lottery, Kazmaier and his partner Jushin "Thunder" Liger defeated Diamond Dallas Page and Mike Graham in Norfolk, Virginia. While in WCW, Kazmaier also wrestled for New Japan Pro-Wrestling. In NJPW, his theme music was "Poundcake" by Van Halen. He retired from wrestling in 1992.

== Life after competition ==
Kazmaier opened a fitness club, Kaz Fitness Center, in Auburn, Alabama in the early 1980s. The gym closed in 2005. Kazmaier then opened, and continues to operate, S.W.A.T. gym in Opelika, Alabama. Both served as a place for him to train and as headquarters for DynaKaz Inc., Kazmaier's own exercise equipment import-export company, which markets fitness products worldwide.

On retiring from active competition in the 1990s, Kazmaier was hired as a co-commentator for the American ESPN broadcast of the annual World's Strongest Man competition along with Todd Harris and 2006 World's Strongest Man winner Phil Pfister. He also comments in the British broadcast.

Kazmaier has worked as a motivational speaker for 3D Sports Tech, addressing school and YMCA groups. "I can and I will" is the message he conveys to inspire young people to lead healthier and more productive lives.

== Personal life ==
Bill Kazmaier's nickname is "Kaz". He is the youngest child of William Bartholomew and Florence Louise Steinhoff Kazmaier. He had one brother, two sisters, and a half brother. His father owned soda water bottling plants in Burlington and Kenosha, Wisconsin.

In 1974 Kazmaier read a Bible verse in Psalm 40 while at the Madison YMCA and subsequently became a devoted Christian, crediting much of his success and exceptional strength to "the power of Jesus Christ."

He lives in Auburn, Alabama and has a son, Eric.

== Personal records ==
=== Powerlifting ===
performed in official powerlifting full meets

- Squat – 925.9 lb (420 kg) equipped in 80s marathon squat suit (Jan, 1981)
- Bench press – 661.4 lb (300 kg) raw (Jan, 1981)

→ former IPF world record in SHW class (+regardless of weight class) (stood until Ted Arcidi's 666.9 lb (303 kg) in 1984)

- Deadlift – 837.7 lb (380 kg) raw (Jan, 1981)
- Deadlift – 886 lb (402 kg) equipped (Nov, 1981)

→ former IPF world record in SHW class (+regardless of weight class) (stood until Lars Norén's 892.9 lb (405 kg) in 1987)
→ former all-time world record deadlift in SHW class (+regardless of weight class) (stood until Dan Wohleber's 904 lb (410 kg) in 1982)

- Total – 2,425 lb (1,100 kg) (925.9 + 661.4 + 837.7 lb (420 + 300 + 380 kg)) raw except for the squat which was equipped (Jan, 1981)

→ former IPF world record in SHW class (+regardless of weight class) (stood until John Ware's 2,427 lb (1,101 kg) in 1989, which was equipped with an 80s marathon squat suit and also a bench shirt)

=== Strongman ===
- Deadlift – 915 lb (415 kg) Raw, with wrist straps (1981 Highland Games) (Unofficial World Record)

→ Initially measured 891 lb (404 kg) but later declared to be the above mentioned weight. Judged by Douglas Edmunds.
This lift was not surpassed until Jón Páll Sigmarsson did 942.5 lb (427.5 kg) in 1987. However both were not considered official deadlift records because the weights and setup used did not allow the bar to stay at the standard 9 inches off the floor, making them slightly elevated deadlifts

- Silver Dollar Deadlift – 1,055 lb (478.5 kg) 18 inches off the floor (1982 World's Strongest Man) (Former Joint-World Record)
- Hungarian Farm Cart Deadlift – 1,124 lb (510 kg) (1988 World's Strongest Man) (World Record)
- Car Deadlift – 2,555 lb (1,159 kg) lifting two tires off the ground (1979 World's Strongest Man) (World Record)
- Cement Block Squat (on Smith Machine/ not to parallel depth) – 969 lb (439.5 kg) (1981 World's Strongest Man) (World Record)
- Log lift (with vintage irregular V.1 log) – 375 lb (170 kg) (1988 World's Strongest Man) (World Record)

→ Kazmaier held this record a total of 3 times ever since he did it first with 346 lb (157 kg) in 1980 World's Strongest Man.
These wooden logs of the era were awkward in shape with a larger circumference than what are used today in mainstream Strongman. They were not machined and were highly unbalanced in weight. Kazmaier pressed these logs strict, without using leg drive

- Dumbbell press – 120 lb (54 kg) dumbells x 17 reps (1980 World Strongbow)
- Wheelbarrow carry (no straps) – 272 kg (600 lb) (40m course) in 14.40 seconds (1980 World's Strongest Man) (World Record)
- Weight over bar – 56 lb (25.4 kg) over 5.34 metres (17 ft 6 in) (1987 Pure Strength) (Former World Record)
- Stone block throw – 55 lb (25 kg) for 7.86 metres (25 ft 9 in) (1987 Le Defi Mark Ten International) (World Record)
- Sack carry – 200 lb (91 kg) for 200m course in 42.63 seconds (1987 Le Defi Mark Ten International) (World Record)

=== Other ===
- Inch dumbbell press – 172 lb (78 kg) first man to press the legendary dumbbell overhead (World Record) and also the fifth man to lift it above the knee (1990)
- Inver Stone press – 260 lb (118 kg) first man to press the original Inver stone overhead (World Record)
- Seated military press – 448 lb (203 kg) x 3 reps (1988) (Unofficial World Record) Previous record was 407 lb (185 kg) by Chuck Ahrens
- Dumbbell shoulder press – 165 lb (75 kg) dumbbells x 5 reps and 155 lb (70 kg) dumbbells x 10 reps (1981)
- Snatch – 286 lb (130 kg)
- Clean and jerk – 374 lb (170 kg)
- Barbell cheat curl – 400 lb (181 kg) (1985) (Unofficial World Record)
- Side laterals with miniature Louis Cyr dumbbells (with a slight hold) – 100 + 90 lb (45 + 41 kg) dumbbells x 6 reps (1988)

==== Combined lifts ====
- Career aggregate powerlifting total – 2,473.3 lb (1,122 kg) (925.9 + 661.4 + 886.0 lb (420 + 300 + 402 kg)) (1981)
  (equipped except for the bench press which was performed raw)
- Career aggregate Supertotal (Individual 5 lift PR weightlifting & powerlifting total):
  286 lb (130 kg) + 374 lb (170 kg) + 925.9 lb (420 kg) + 661.4 lb (300 kg) + 886 lb (402 kg) = 3,133.3 lb (1,421 kg)

== Achievements ==
Professional Competitive Record – [1st (18),2nd (4), 3rd (4) – Out of Total(29)]
International winning percentage of 44.5%

Professional	1st	2nd	3rd	4th	5th	6th	7th	8th	9th	10th	INJ	DNQ	Total
American or other Nationals	10		1										11
International	8	4	3	3									18
Combined	18	4	4	3									29

COMPLETED CONTESTS

- (United Kingdom) Pure Strength 4 Team Challenge – winner (1990)
- (United Kingdom) World's Strongest Man – 4th place (1989)
- (Scotland) Pure Strength 3 Team Challenge – 2nd place (1989)
- (Scotland) Scottish Power Challenge – winner (1989)
- (Iceland) World's Strongest Man – 2nd place (1988)

World Strongman Challenge – 3rd place (1988)

- (United Kingdom) Pure Strength 2 Team Challenge – winner (1988)

World Muscle Power Championships – winner (1988)

- (Scotland) Scottish Power Challenge – winner (1988)
- (Scotland) Pure Strength – Ultimate Challenge – 2nd place (1987)
- (Canada) Le Defi Mark Ten Challenge – winner (1987)
- (Scotland) Scottish Power Challenge – winner (1987)
- (Scotland) Scottish Power Challenge – winner (1986)

World Muscle Power Championships – 3rd place (1985)

- (Scotland) Scottish Power Challenge – winner (1985)
- (Scotland) Scottish Power Challenge – winner (1984)
- (United States) World's Strongest Man – winner (1982)
- (United States) World's Strongest Man – winner (1981)
- (United Kingdom) Strongbow Superman Contest – winner (1981)
- (United Kingdom) Strongbow Strongman Contest – winner (1980)
- (United States) World's Strongest Man – winner (1980)
- (United States) World's Strongest Man – 3rd place (1979)

== See also ==
- List of strongmen
- Progression of the bench press world record
