= List of British bodybuilders =

This is a list of male and female British bodybuilders. British can be either citizens of the United Kingdom, islands of British Crown Dependencies, or of one of the British overseas territories can be classed as British.

Neil Andrews

== B ==
- Albert Beckles
- Brian Bell
- Andrulla Blanchette
- Sam Bond
- Sarah Bridges
- Carl Broomfield

== C ==
- Rene Campbell
- Geoff Capes
- Carolyn Cheshire
- Sean Connery

== D ==
- Rob Dixon

== E ==
- Gregor Edmunds
- Eddy Ellwood

== F ==
- Mark Felix
- Bertil Fox

== G ==
- Mick Gosling
- Richard Gosling
- Angus Graham

== H ==
- Terry Hollands
- Tony Holland

== I ==
- Brian Irwin

== K ==
- Carmen Knights

== L ==
- John Lees
- Marc Iliffe

== M ==
- Karen Marillier
- Jimmy Marku
- Wendy McCready
- Gayle Moher
- Graham Mullins
- Stuart Murray
- Neil McPhail
- Matt Morsia

== N ==
- Jamo Nezzar

== P ==
- Reg Park
- David Prowse
- Lee Powell

== R ==
- Andrew Raynes
- Jamie Reeves
- Adrian Rollinson
- Glenn Ross
- Rob Riches

== S ==
- Nicola Shaw
- Mark Smith
- Ramsford Smith
- Emma Sue
- Dawn Sutherland

Andrew Searle

== T ==
- Gary Taylor
- Oli Thompson
- Dave Titterton
- Mike Thurston
- Grant Thomas

== W ==
- David Warner

== Y ==
- Dorian Yates

== Z ==
- Zakos Pallikaros

== See also ==
- List of female professional bodybuilders
- List of male professional bodybuilders
- List of German bodybuilders
