= Strength athletics in the United Kingdom and Ireland =

Strength athletics in the United Kingdom and Ireland has a long history going back many centuries before the televisation of strongman competitions in the 1970s. The ancient heritage of the sport in the United Kingdom and Ireland lies in a number of traditional events, the most famous of which is arguably the traditional Highland Games, which itself is a source of many events now practised in modern strongman competitions, such as World's Strongest Man and International Federation of Strength Athletes (IFSA) sponsored events. However, the traditional events still are popularly contested events today. In the more modern phenomenon that is the World's Strongest Man and its associated competitions, the United Kingdom and Ireland remain well represented with Glenn Ross, Terry Hollands, Eddie Hall, Luke Stoltman and Tom Stoltman, with regular appearances at world finals, and with three men having won the title of World's Strongest Man.

== History ==
The origin of strength athletics in the UK and Ireland lies in the realms of pre-history, but the within the British Isles records many centuries old record more formally the existence of organised events. Formalisation and annual Highland gatherings began around 1820 when Sir Walter Scott encouraged the revival of Highland Culture. By 1848, such was the status of such games that Queen Victoria attended the Braemar Highland Games.

The strongmen of the world of weightlifting and circus acts were also active in the UK and Ireland in the Victorian age. A number of famous names emerged at the turn of the nineteenth century. Thomas Inch, Britain's Strongest Youth at 16, and the first official Britain's Strongest Man was active at this time and is still remembered today for his Grip Strength. and his Challenge Dumbbell, known as the Inch Dumbbell, that "has defied thousands of strong men over the last hundred years...Many a strength athlete tried but failed to break it off the ground.". Other notable names in this genre were Bert Assirati, Launceston Elliot, Edward Aston, and William Pullum. Others emerged in the twentieth century as well. Notably, David Prowse was initially famous in 1964 for his lifting the famed 733 pounds (332 kg) Dinnie Stones, the first man to do so since Donald Dinnie himself a century earlier. Prowse later became more famous still for playing Darth Vader in Star Wars.

In the late 1970s, televised strongman competitions began with Britain's Strongest Man (BSM) first being shown in 1979 by the BBC. A new generation emerged, with the events attracting individuals from many disciplines such as field athletics, weightlifting and powerlifting. These competitions fed other international competitions such as Europe's Strongest Man and World's Strongest Man. Household names, such as Geoff Capes, Jamie Reeves and Gary Taylor dominated, with these three in particular going on to win World's Strongest Man titles. The modern era has seen this trend continue with Terry Hollands, Mark Felix and Laurence Shahlaei being regular faces at World's Strongest Man and its associated Super Series. Featured events in these contests have been tailored to emphasize a more well-rounded athlete, to reflect that viewpoint on strongman as a whole, and in the interests of increased popularity and marketability among the masses. Almost inevitably, more than one interested party has seen the benefits of strength competitions. Alternative organizations have formed in recent years, comprising a new wave of influence in the field, with the United Kingdom Strength Council (UKSC) founded by Britain's Strongest Man multi-year champion Glenn Ross setting up events separate from BSM, as has the IFSA. Ross and his UK Strongest Man competitions hold a philosophical difference in approach with the World's Strongest Man related venues, including more brute strength events similar to traditional strongman and powerlifting, with less emphasis on field athleticism and endurance.

Alongside these current interpretations still exists the traditional, such as the Highland Games. Although exported around the world they remain inextricably linked with the heritage of both Scotland and the British Isles as a whole.

== Competitions ==
Across the UK and Ireland there are and have been many competitions testing individuals strength, ranging from local to regional to national to pan-British Isles.

=== List of Champions ===
==== 2020s ====
Year	Britain's Strongest Man	UK Strongest Man	WSM invitees
2026	(Scotland) Tom Stoltman (4)	(England) Andrew Flynn (2)	Tom Stoltman; Luke Stoltman; Andrew Flynn; Luke Richardson; Paddy Haynes; Adam Bishop
2025	(Scotland) Luke Stoltman	(England) Andrew Flynn	Tom Stoltman; Luke Stoltman; Andrew Flynn; Luke Richardson; Paddy Haynes; Shane Flowers
2024	(Scotland) Tom Stoltman (3)	(England) Paul Smith (3)	Tom Stoltman; Luke Stoltman; Gavin Bilton; Adam Bishop; Kane Francis; Pa O'Dwyer
2023	(England) Adam Bishop (2)	(England) Paul Smith (2)	Tom Stoltman; Luke Stoltman; Gavin Bilton; Graham Hicks; Adam Bishop; Mark Felix; Paul Smith
2022	(Scotland) Tom Stoltman (2)	(England) Paul Smith	Adam Bishop; Mark Felix; Gavin Bilton; Luke Stoltman; Andy Black; Shane Flowers
2021	(Scotland) Tom Stoltman	(Wales) Gavin Bilton (2)	Adam Bishop; Mark Felix; Graham Hicks; Terry Hollands; Gavin Bilton; Luke Richardson; Luke Stoltman
2020	(England) Adam Bishop	(Wales) Gavin Bilton	Luke Richardson; Adam Bishop; Terry Hollands; Mark Felix; Graham Hicks; Luke Stoltman; Tom Stoltman; Pa O'Dwyer

==== 2010s ====
Year	Britain's Strongest Man	UK Strongest Man	WSM invitees
2019	(England) Graham Hicks	(Scotland) Paul Benton	Adam Bishop; Mark Felix; Laurence Shahlaei; Luke Stoltman; Tom Stoltman; Zake Muluzi
2018	(England) Eddie Hall (5)	(Republic of Ireland) Pa O'Dwyer	Adam Bishop; Mark Felix; Graham Hicks; Terry Hollands; Laurence Shahlaei; Luke Stoltman; Paul Smith
2017	(England) Eddie Hall (4)	(England) Laurence Shahlaei	Mark Felix; Eddie Hall; Terry Hollands; Laurence Shahlaei; Luke Stoltman; Tom Stoltman
2016	(England) Eddie Hall (3)	(England) Eddie Hall (6)	Adam Bishop; Mark Felix; Charlie Gough; Eddie Hall; Terry Hollands; Laurence Shahlaei; Luke Stoltman
2015	(England) Eddie Hall (2)	(England) Eddie Hall (5)	Adam Bishop; Mark Felix; Eddie Hall; Graham Hicks; Laurence Shahlaei
2014	(England) Eddie Hall	(England) Eddie Hall (4)	Eddie Hall; Graham Hicks; Ben Kelsey; Terry Hollands; Laurence Shahlaei
2013	(England) Laurence Shahlaei (2)	(England) Eddie Hall (3)	Mark Felix; Eddie Hall; Graham Hicks; Terry Hollands; Laurence Shahlaei; Lloyd Renals
2012	(England) Laurence Shahlaei	(England) Eddie Hall (2)	Chris Gearing; Eddie Hall; Graham Hicks; Terry Hollands; Jack McIntosh; Laurence Shahlaei (injured - withdrew)
2011	Not held	(England) Eddie Hall	Mark Felix; Terry Hollands; Jack McIntosh; Laurence Shahlaei; Rob Frampton
2010	Not held	(Northern Ireland) Glenn Ross (5)	Mark Felix; Terry Hollands; Darren Sadler; Laurence Shahlaei; Mark Westaby; Reserve: Rob Frampton

==== 2000s ====
Year	Britain's Strongest Man	UK Strongest Man	Britain's Most Powerful Man	UK Championship (IFSA)/ British Championships (IFSA)	WSM invitees
2009	Not held	(England) Jimmy Marku	(England) Paul Carter	Not held	Laurence Shahlaei; Terry Hollands; Mark Felix; Jimmy Marku; Darren Sadler
2008	(England) Jimmy Marku	(Northern Ireland) Glenn Ross (4)	Not held	Not held	Laurence Shahlaei; Terry Hollands; Mark Felix; Jimmy Marku; Oli Thompson
2007	(England) Terry Hollands	(Northern Ireland) Glenn Ross (3)	(England) Jay Hughes	Not held	Darren Sadler; Terry Hollands; Mark Felix; Jimmy Marku; Mark Westaby
2006	(England) Oli Thompson	(Northern Ireland) Glenn Ross (2)	Not held	Not held	Darren Sadler; Terry Hollands; Mark Felix
2005	(England) Mick Gosling	(England) Terry Hollands	Not held	(England) Mark Felix	Terry Hollands; Mick Gosling; Brian Irwin; Carl Waitoa (rep. NZL)
2004	(England) Richard Gosling (2)	(Northern Ireland) Glenn Ross	Not held	Not held	Adrian Rollinson
2003	(England) Richard Gosling	Not held	Not held	Not held	Adrian Rollinson; Eddy Ellwood; Glenn Ross; Richard Gosling; Carl Broomfield
2002	(England) Marc Iliffe	Not held	Not held	Not held	Gregor Edmunds; Marc Illiffe; David Warner; Mick Gosling; Stuart Murray
2001	(Northern Ireland) Glenn Ross (3)	(England) Steve Brooks	Not held	Not held	Glenn Ross; Rob Dixon; Marc Illiffe; Adrian Rollinson; Andrew Raynes
2000	(Northern Ireland) Glenn Ross (2)	(England) Richard Gosling (2)	Not held	Not held	Glenn Ross; Rob Dixon; Adrian Rollinson; Brian Bell

==== 1990s ====
Year	Britain's Strongest Man	British Muscle Power Championship	UK Strongest Man	UK Championship (IFSA)/ British Championships (IFSA)	UK Strongman Docklands Challenge	WSM invitees
1999	(Northern Ireland) Glenn Ross	Not held	(England) Richard Gosling	Not held	(England) Bill Pittuck	Glenn Ross; Bill Pittuck; Steve Brooks; Lee Bowers; Jamie Barr
1998	(England) Jamie Reeves (4)	(England) Russ Bradley (2)	(England) Adrian Smith (3)	Not held	(England) Russ Bradley	Glenn Ross; Russ Bradley; Frazer Tranter; Lee Bowers; Jamie Barr
1997	(England) Rob Dixon	(England) Russ Bradley	(England) Adrian Smith (2)	(Scotland) Stuart Murray	(England) Adam Waldron	Robert Weir; Russ Bradley; Brian Bell
1996	(England) Russ Bradley	(England) Jamie Reeves (2)	(England) Graham Mullins	Not held	Not held	Bill Pittuck; Forbes Cowan; Brian Bell
1995	(Scotland) Forbes Cowan (2)	(Wales) Gary Taylor	(England) Dave Miles	Not held	Not held	Gary Taylor; Bill Pittuck; Forbes Cowan
1994	(England) Bill Pittuck	(England) Jamie Reeves	(England) Tommy Smith	Not held	Not held	Forbes Cowan; Gary Taylor
1993	(Scotland) Forbes Cowan	(Scotland) Forbes Cowan	(England) Bill Pittuck	Not held	Not held	Gary Taylor
1992	Jamie Reeves	(England) Mark Higgins (4)	(England) Adrian Smith	Not held	Not held	Gary Taylor; Jamie Reeves
1991	(Wales) Gary Taylor	(England) Mark Higgins (3)	Not held	Not held	Not held	Gary Taylor
1990	(England) Adrian Smith	(England) Mark Higgins (2)	Not held	Not held	Not held	Adrian Smith

==== 1979 and 1980s ====
Year	Britain's Strongest Man	British Muscle Power Championship	Britain's Most Powerful Man	WSM invitees
1989	(England) Jamie Reeves (2)	(England) Tom Hawk	Not held	Jamie Reeves
1988	(England) Jamie Reeves; John Smith's Trial of Strength	(England) Mark Higgins	Not held	Jamie Reeves
1987	Not held	(England) Geoff Capes (2)	Not held	No WSM
1986	Not held	(England) Geoff Capes	(England) Pete Tancred	Geoff Capes
1985	Not held	Not held	Not held	Geoff Capes
1984	(England) Allan Crossley	Not held	Not held	Geoff Capes
1983	(England) Geoff Capes (3)	Not held	Not held	Geoff Capes
1982	(England) Richard Slaney (2)	Not held	Not held	Geoff Capes
1981	(England) Geoff Capes (2)	Not held	Not held	Geoff Capes
1980	(England) Richard Slaney	Not held	Not held	Geoff Capes
1979	(England) Geoff Capes	Not held	Not held	Geoff Capes

=== Pan-British Isles ===
- Britain's Strongest Man
- British Championships (IFSA)
- UK Strongest Man

==== British Championships (IFSA) ====
Year	Champion	Runner-up	3rd Place	Location
2005	(England) Mark Felix	(England) Oli Thompson	(England) Andrew 'Stumpy' Raynes	TBC

==== Others ====
===== UK Championship (IFSA) =====
Year	Champion	Runner-up	3rd Place	Location
1997	(Scotland) Stuart Murray	(England) Steve Brooks	(England) Russ Bradley	TBC

===== Britain's Most Powerful Man =====
Year	Champion	Runner-up	3rd Place	Location
2009	(England) Paul Carter	(England) Chris Gearing	(England) Paul Wood	TBC
2007	(England) Jay Hughes	(England) Adam Townsend	(England) Paul Wood	TBC
1986	(Jersey) Pete Tancred	(England) Peter Davis	(England) Joe Walker	TBC

===== UK Strongman Docklands Challenge =====
Year	Champion	Runner-up	3rd Place	Location
1999	(England) Bill Pittuck	(England) Andy Bolton	(Northern Ireland) Glenn Ross	(England) Peacock Gym, Canning Town, London
1998	(England) Russ Bradley	(England) Frazer Tranter	(England) TBC	(England) Peacock Gym, Canning Town, London
1997	(England) Adam Waldron	(England) Steve Winter	(England) Frazer Tranter	(England) Peacock Gym, Canning Town, London

===== British Muscle Power Championship =====
Year	Champion	Runner-up	3rd Place	Location
1998	(England) Russ Bradley	(England) Lee Bowers	(Faroe Islands) Regin Vagadal	TBC
1997	(England) Russ Bradley	TBC	TBC	TBC
1996	(Wales) Gary Taylor	TBC	TBC	TBC
1995	(Wales) Gary Taylor	TBC	TBC	TBC
1994	(Austria) Manfred Hoeberl	(Scotland) Jamie Barr	(Scotland) Forbes Cowan	TBC
1993	(Scotland) Forbes Cowan	TBC	TBC	TBC
1992	(England) Jamie Reeves	TBC	TBC	TBC
1991	(England) Paul Lupton	TBC	TBC	TBC
1990	(England) Jamie Reeves	TBC	TBC	TBC
1989	(England) Mark Higgins	(England) Adrian Smith	(Scotland) Ian Murray	TBC
1988	(England) Mark Higgins	TBC	TBC	TBC
1987	(England) Geoff Capes	(England) Jamie Reeves	(England) Mark Higgins	Scotland
1986	(England) Geoff Capes	TBC	TBC	TBC

=== Team Competitions ===
Year	Champions	Runners-up	3rd Place	Location
2007	(England) Shawn Kenny & Martin Jones	(England) Lee Bowers & Paul Cater	(England) Paul Amor & Keith Garrett	
2008	(England) Laurence Shahlaei & Rob Frampton	(England) Paul Cater & Rich Gorvin	(England) Dale Norris & Martin Jones	
2009	(England) Enzo Martino & Jay	(England) Jay Hughes & Chris Gearing	(England) Lee Bowers & Liam O'Sullivan	
2011	(England) Graham Hicks & James Wilmot	(England) Ashley Smith & Freddy Hick	(England) Phill Wooton and Will Egan	Swindon

=== Truck Pulling ===
- UK Truck Pulling Championships – (Mercedes Benz)
- National Truck Pulling Championships – (ASA/Bristol Street Motors)
- British Truck Pulling Championships – (Commercial Vehicle Show at the NEC)

=== National and Regional ===
==== England's Strongest Man ====
There have been a number of competitions laying claim to be able to confer this title. The UKSC version, which acts as a qualifier for the UK Strongest Man competition, is generally regarded as the official version. For this reason, the UKSC results since they took over the running of the competition are presented below simply as a continuation of the former year's official event.

In 2005, the IFSA introduced their own version of the championships which only lasted for one year. In 2009, with the apparent demise of Britain's Strongest Man, a traditional qualifier for World's Strongest Man, Colin Bryce promoted a competition held at the Doncaster Dome that also acted as a WSM qualifier. The latter saw Terry Hollands, Darren Sadler and Mark Felix compete thus reinforcing its credentials. The UKSC did have every other recognised athlete including BSM 2008 champion Jimmy Marku. There were athletes that competed in both, such as Mark Westaby.

Until 2010, Bob Daglish's Elite strongman promotions was inextricably associated with the UKSC and the UKSC version of England's Strongest Man was also the Elite Strongman Promotions event. However, it was announced in March 2010 that "In view of recent events and also some personal differences, Elite Strongman Promotions are hereby separating all affiliations with Big G promotions, the UK Strength Council and the UK strongest man competition." Elite Strongman promotions continued to run a version of the England's strongest man final, whilst a separate competition run by UKSC was also run in 2010.

Year	Champion	Runner-up	3rd Place	Location	Promoter
2026	(England) Andrew Flynn	(England) Joe Oliver	(England) Ben Glasscock	(England) York Barbican, York	Giants Live
2026	(England) Joe Brown	(England) Andrew Flynn	(England) Paul Smith	(England) The Dome, Doncaster	Ultimate Strongman
2025	(England) Dean Mason	(England) Andrew Flynn	(England) Paul Smith	(England) The Dome, Doncaster	Ultimate Strongman
2025	(England) Paddy Haynes	(England) Andrew Flynn	(England) Kane Francis	(England) York Barbican, York	Giants Live
2024	(England) Andrew Flynn	(England) Paddy Haynes	(England) Paul Smith	(England) Halliwell Jones Stadium, Warrington	Ultimate Strongman
2024	(England) Kane Francis	(England) Andrew Flynn	(England) Paddy Haynes	(England) York Barbican, York	Giants Live
2023	(England) Patrick Haynes	(England) Andrew Flynn	(England) Max Searby	The Halliwell Jones Stadium, Warrington	Ultimate Strongman
2023	(England) Luke Richardson	(England) Kane Francis	(England) Patrick Haynes	(England) The Dome, Doncaster	Giants Live
2022	(England) Paul Smith	(England) Andrew Flynn	(England) Lewis Packham	(England) Haliwell Jones Stadium, Warrington	Ultimate Strongman
2022	(England) Ryan Bennet	(England) Ben Williams	(England) Kane Francis	(England) Liverpool Exhibition Center, Liverpool	Giants Live
2021	(England) Paul Smith	(England) Sam Duffy	(England) Lewis Packham	(England) Haliwell Jones Stadium, Warrington	Ultimate Strongman
2021	(England) Shane Flowers	(England) Ryan Oldfield	(England) Kevin Colis	(England) Liverpool Exhibition Center, Liverpool	Giants Live
2020	(England) Paul Smith	TBC	TBC	TBC	Ultimate Strongman
2018	(England) Sean Logan	(England) Phil Roberts	TBC	TBC	Ultimate Strongman
2017	(England) Phil Roberts	TBC	TBC	TBC	Ultimate Strongman
2016	(England) Paul Smith	TBC	TBC	TBC	Ultimate Strongman
2014	(England) Ben Kelsey	(England) Adam Bishop	(England) Chris Gearing	(England) Northwood Stadium, Stoke-on-Trent	UKSC
2013	(England) Eddie Hall	(England) Ben Kelsey	(England) Tom Shaw	(England) Reading, Berkshire	UKSC
2012	(England) Paul Carter	(England) Mike Woods	(England) Adam Bishop	(England) Long Marston, Stratford-upon-Avon	Elite
2012	(England) Chris Gearing	(England) Gary Gardener	(England) Mark Lawson	(England) Aylesford, Kent	UKSC
2011	(England) Lloyd Renals	(England) Mike Woods	(England) Mark Lawson	(England) Billingham, Teesside	Elite
2011	(England) Eddie Hall	(England) Tom Shaw	(England) Rob Drennan	(England) Colchester, Essex	UKSC
2010	(England) Eddie Hall	(England) Jay Hughes	(England) Paul Amor	(England) Billingham, Teesside	Elite
2010	(England) Dean Slater	(England) Gary Gardener	(England) Rob Frampton	(England)	UKSC
2009	(England) Laurence Shahlaei	(England) Mark Westaby	(England) Alex Culletto	(England) Lichfield	Elite/UKSC
2009	(England) Terry Hollands	(England) Mark Felix	(England) Darren Sadler	(England) Doncaster Dome	Colin Bryce/WSM qualifier
2008	(England) Jimmy Marku	(England) Dave McAneney	(England) Spencer Hyland	Lichfield	Elite/UKSC
2007	(England) Jimmy Marku	(England) Jay Hughes	(England) Rob Frampton	Lichfield	Elite/UKSC
2006	(England) Jimmy Marku	(England) Dave Meer	(England) Simon R Flint	Stoke-on-Trent	Elite/UKSC
2005	(England) Adam Townsend	(England) Terry Hollands	(England) Simon Morton	Stoke-on-Trent	Elite/UKSC
2005	(England) Eddy Ellwood	(England) Mark Felix	(England) Oli Thompson	Sheffield Stadium	IFSA
2004	(England) Eddy Ellwood	(England) Andrew 'Stumpy' Raynes	(England) Mark Felix	TBC	TBC
2003	(England) Eddy Ellwood	(England) Bill Pittuck	(England) Richard Gosling	TBC	TBC
2002	(England) Bill Pittuck	(England) Mick Gosling	(England) Ade Rollinson	TBC	TBC
2001	(England) Bill Pittuck	(England) Steve Brooks	(England) Andrew 'Stumpy' Raynes	TBC	TBC
2000	TBC	TBC	TBC	TBC	TBC
1999	TBC	TBC	TBC	TBC	TBC
1998	TBC	TBC	TBC	TBC	TBC
1997	(England) Jamie Reeves	TBC	TBC	TBC	TBC
1996	(England) Jamie Reeves	TBC	TBC	TBC	TBC
1995	(England) Jamie Reeves	TBC	TBC	TBC	TBC
1994	(England) Jamie Reeves	TBC	TBC	TBC	TBC
1993	(England) Jamie Reeves	TBC	TBC	TBC	TBC
1992	(England) Jamie Reeves	TBC	TBC	TBC	TBC
1991	(England) Bill Pittuck	TBC	TBC	TBC	TBC
1990	(England) Adrian Smith	TBC	TBC	TBC	TBC
1989	(England) Jamie Reeves	TBC	TBC	TBC	TBC
1988	(England) Jamie Reeves	TBC	TBC	TBC	TBC
1987	(England) Jamie Reeves	TBC	TBC	TBC	TBC

==== Scotland's Strongest Man ====
Scotland's Strongest Man started in 1987 with Iain Murray winning the inaugural championship.

Year	Champion	Runner-up	3rd Place	Location	Promoter
2026	(Scotland) Callum Crozier (2)	(Scotland) Chris Beetham	(Scotland) Scott Milne	(Scotland) Grangemouth Stadium	Ultimate Strongman
2025	(Scotland) Callum Crozier	(Scotland) Connor Curran	(Scotland) Chris Beetham	(Scotland) SEC Centre, Glasgow	Giants Live
2025	(Scotland) Callum Crozier	(Scotland) Chris Beetham	(Scotland) Jamie Kleiman	(Scotland) Braehead Arena	Ultimate Strongman
2024	(Scotland) Chris Beetham	(Scotland) Andy Black	(Scotland) Fraser Gullan	(Scotland) SEC Centre, Glasgow	Giants Live
2024	(Scotland) Chris Beetham	(Scotland) Louis Jack	(Scotland) Scott Fraser	(Scotland) Grangemouth Stadium	Ultimate Strongman
2023	(Scotland) Connor Curran	(Scotland) Callum Crozier	(Scotland) Chris Beetham	(Scotland) SEC Centre, Glasgow	Giants Live
2023	(Scotland) Louis Jack (3)	(Scotland) Chris Beetham	(Scotland) Callum Crozier	(Scotland) Grangemouth Stadium	Ultimate Strongman
2022	(Scotland) Louis Jack	(Malawi) Zake Muluzi	(Scotland) Connor Curran	(Scotland) SEC Centre, Glasgow	Giants Live
2022	(Scotland) Louis Jack (2)	(Scotland) Chris Beetham	(Scotland) Callum Crozier	(Scotland) Grangemouth Stadium	Ultimate Strongman
2021	(Scotland) Louis Jack	(Scotland) Stuart Graham	(Scotland) Charlie Little		Ultimate Strongman
2021	(Scotland) Andy Black	(Scotland) Michael Wilson	(Malawi) Zake Muluzi	(Scotland) SEC Centre, Glasgow	Giants Live
2020	No Contest due to the COVID-19 pandemic				
2019	(Scotland) Tom Stoltman (2)	(Scotland) Luke Stoltman	(Scotland) John Pollock	(Scotland) SEC Centre, Glasgow	
2018	(Scotland) Tom Stoltman	(Scotland) Luke Stoltman	(Malawi) Zake Muluzi	(Scotland) SEC Centre, Glasgow	
2017	(Scotland) Luke Stoltman (5)	(Scotland) Tom Stoltman	(Scotland) Paul Benton	(Scotland) David Keswick athletic centre, Dumfries	
2016	(Scotland) Luke Stoltman (4)	(Scotland) Tom Stoltman	(Scotland) Paul Benton	(Scotland) David Keswick athletic centre, Dumfries	
2015	(Scotland) Luke Stoltman (3)	(Scotland) Tom Stoltman	(Malawi) Zake Muluzi	(Scotland) TBC	
2014	(Scotland) Luke Stoltman (2)	(Scotland) Stephen Cherrie	(Scotland) Thomas Parkes	TBC	
2013	(Scotland) Luke Stoltman	(Scotland) John Hutton	(Scotland) Mark Hunter	TBC	
2012	(Scotland) Ken Nowicki	(Scotland) Stephen Cherrie	TBC	TBC	
2011	(Scotland) Stephen Cherrie	(Scotland) John Hutton	(Scotland) Ewan Cameron	TBC	
2010	(Scotland) Chris Innes (4)	(Scotland) Stephen Cherrie	(Scotland) Stuart Murray	TBC	
2009	(Scotland) Chris Innes (3)	TBC	TBC	TBC	
2008	(Scotland) Chris Innes (2)	(Scotland) Ewan Cameron	TBC	TBC	
2007	(Scotland) Chris Innes	(Scotland) Andy Cairney	(Scotland) Louis McLean	TBC	
2006	(Scotland) Jamie Barr (5)	(Scotland) Andy Cairney	(Scotland) Raymond Christie	TBC	
2005	(Scotland) Brian Turner	(Scotland) Jamie Barr	(Scotland) Stuart Murray	TBC	
2004	(Scotland) Paul Porteous	(Scotland) Brian Turner	(Scotland) Stuart Murray	TBC	
2003	(Scotland) Forbes Cowan (5)	(Scotland) Paul Porteous	(Scotland) Gregor Edmunds	TBC	
2002	(Scotland) Gregor Edmunds	(Scotland) Forbes Cowan	(Scotland) Brian Bell	TBC	
2001	(Scotland) Jamie Barr (4)	TBC	TBC	TBC	
2000	(Scotland) Jamie Barr (3)	TBC	TBC	TBC	
1999	(Scotland) Jamie Barr (2)	TBC	TBC	TBC	
1998	(Scotland) Brian Bell (2)	TBC	TBC	TBC	
1997	No contest held				
1996	(Scotland) Forbes Cowan (4)	TBC	TBC	TBC	
1995	(Scotland) Forbes Cowan (3)	TBC	TBC	TBC	
1994	(Scotland) Jamie Barr	TBC	TBC	TBC	
1993	(Scotland) Forbes Cowan (2)	TBC	TBC	TBC	
1992	(Scotland) Forbes Cowan	TBC	TBC	TBC	
1991	(Scotland) Iain Murray (4)	TBC	TBC	TBC	
1990	(Scotland) Brian Bell	TBC	TBC	TBC	
1989	(Scotland) Iain Murray (3)	TBC	TBC	TBC	
1988	(Scotland) Iain Murray (2)	TBC	TBC	TBC	
1987	(Scotland) Iain Murray	TBC	TBC	TBC	

==== Wales' Strongest Man ====
Wales' Strongest Man started in 1989 with Gary Taylor winning the inaugural championship. 2013 saw the first ever televised event taken place at Haven Prestahaven Sands in Prestatyn.

Year	Champion	Runner-up	3rd Place	Location					
2026	(Wales) Luke Weaver	(Wales) Matt Dimond	(Wales) Luke Williams	Cardiff, Wales|-	2025	(Wales) Jamie Nelson	(Wales) Matt Dimond	(Wales) William Jones	Cardiff, Wales
2024	(Wales) Jacob Brooke	(Wales) Matt Dimond	(Wales) Mark Jeanes	Cardiff, Wales					
2023	(Wales) Mark Jeanes (4)	(Wales) Matt Dimond	(Wales) Luke Sperduti						
2022	(Wales) David Ramplee	(Wales) Luke Sperduti	(Wales) Mark Jeanes	Cardiff, Wales					
2021	(Wales) Gavin Bilton	(Wales) Des Gahan	(Wales) David Ramplee	Llanelli, Wales					
2020	No Contest due to the COVID-19 pandemic								
2019	(Wales) Mark Jeanes (3)	(Wales) Gavin Bilton	(Wales) Matt Dimond	TBC					
2018	(Wales) Ben Brunning (2)	(Wales) Gavin Bilton	(Wales) Richard Bessant	TBC					
2017	(Wales) Ben Brunning	TBC	(Wales) Dale Peters	TBC					
2016	(Wales) Mark Jeanes (2)	(Wales) Ben Brunning	TBC	TBC					
2015	(Wales) Mark Jeanes	(Wales) Nathan Llewellyn	(Wales) Ben Brunning	TBC					
2014	(Wales) Simon Johnston (3)	TBC	TBC	TBC					
2013	(Wales) Simon Johnston (2)	(Wales) Owen Lewis	(Wales) Nathan Llewellyn	Prestatyn, Wales					
2012	(Wales) Simon Johnston	(Wales) Kelvin Gardner	(Wales) Rob Bush	TBC					
2011	(Wales) Richard Smith	(Wales) Martin Jones	(Wales) Emil Hodzivic	Cardiff, Wales					
2010	(Wales) Dale Norris (4)	(Wales) Richard Smith	(Wales) Owen Lewis	Cardiff, Wales					
2009	(Wales) Dale Norris (3)								
2008	(Wales) Jamie Redwood (2)								
2007	(Wales) Jamie Redwood	(Wales) Mike Williams	(Wales) Ross Stone	TBC					
2006	(Wales) Dale Norris (2)	(Wales) Ross Stone	(Wales) Mike Williams	TBC					
2005	(Wales) Dale Norris	(Wales) Michael Williams	(Wales) Walid El Hind	TBC					
2004	(Wales) Dean Bolt	(Wales) Adrian W Davies	TBC	TBC					
2003	(Wales) Christian Clay (5)	(Wales) Adrian W Davies	(Wales) Dean Bolt	TBC					
2002	(Wales) Christian Clay (4)	(Wales) Dean Bolt	(Wales) Adrian W Davies	TBC					
2001	(Wales) Christian Clay (3)	TBC	TBC	TBC					
2000	(Wales) Christian Clay (2)	TBC	TBC	TBC					
1999	(Wales) Christian Clay	TBC	TBC	TBC					
1998	TBC	TBC	TBC	TBC					
1997	(Wales) Gary Taylor (8)	TBC	TBC	TBC					
1996	(Wales) Gary Taylor (7)	TBC	TBC	TBC					
1995	(Wales) Gary Taylor (6)	TBC	TBC	TBC					
1994	(Wales) Gary Taylor (5)	TBC	TBC	TBC					
1993	(Wales) Gary Taylor (4)	TBC	TBC	TBC					
1992	(Wales) Robin McBryde	(Wales) Gary Taylor	TBC	TBC					
1991	(Wales) Gary Taylor (3)	TBC	TBC	TBC					
1990	(Wales) Gary Taylor (2)	TBC	TBC	TBC					
1989	(Wales) Gary Taylor	TBC	TBC	TBC					

==== Ireland's Strongest Man ====
Year	Champion	Runner-up	3rd Place	Location
2026	(Republic of Ireland) Ruairi O'Hagan (2)	(Republic of Ireland) Sean Gillen	(Republic of Ireland) Cillein Groom	Crumlin Road Gaol, Northern Ireland
2025	(Republic of Ireland) Ruairi O'Hagan	(Republic of Ireland) Cillein Groom	(Republic of Ireland) Daniel McElroy	Crumlin Road Gaol, Northern Ireland
2024	(Republic of Ireland) Cillein Groom (2)	(Republic of Ireland) Gerard Buckley	(Republic of Ireland) Jamie McNamara	Crumlin Road Gaol, Northern Ireland
2023	(Republic of Ireland) Cillein Groom	(Republic of Ireland) Ruiari O'Hagan	(Republic of Ireland) Shaun Diver	
2022	(Republic of Ireland) Shaun Diver	(Republic of Ireland) Cillein Groom	(Republic of Ireland) Matthew McCoy	(Republic of Ireland) Field Stadium, Limerick
2021	(Republic of Ireland) Pa O'Dwyer (4)	(Republic of Ireland) Cillein Groom	(Republic of Ireland) David Jones	Bangor, Northern Ireland
2020	(Republic of Ireland) Matthew McCoy	(Republic of Ireland) Matthew McKeegan	(Republic of Ireland) Ivan Gannon	TBC
2019	(Republic of Ireland) Pa O'Dwyer (3)	(Northern Ireland) Jonathan Kelly	(Northern Ireland) Chris McNaghten	TBC
2018	(Republic of Ireland) Pa O'Dwyer (2)	(Republic of Ireland) Daniel Gannon	(Republic of Ireland) Ivan Gannon	Bangor, Northern Ireland
2017	(Republic of Ireland) Pa O'Dwyer	(Republic of Ireland) Matthew McCoy	(Republic of Ireland) Gavin Redmond	Armagh, Northern Ireland
2016	TBC	TBC	TBC	TBC
2015	TBC	TBC	TBC	TBC
2014	TBC	TBC	TBC	TBC
2013	TBC	TBC	TBC	TBC
2012	(Republic of Ireland) James Fennelly (2)	(Republic of Ireland) TBC	(Republic of Ireland) TBC	(Republic of Ireland) Kilmore Quay, Ireland
2011	(Northern Ireland) Jonathan Kelly	(Republic of Ireland) Paul Roberts	(Republic of Ireland) Richard Looney	Derry City, Northern Ireland
2010	(Republic of Ireland) James Fennelly	(Northern Ireland) Jonathan Kelly	(Republic of Ireland) Eoin Shanahan	Isle of Man
2009	(Northern Ireland) Dave Warner (4)	(Republic of Ireland) James Fennelly	(Republic of Ireland) Eoin Shanahan	Lisburn, Northern Ireland
2008	(Northern Ireland) Dave Warner (3)	(Northern Ireland) Gary Mckelvey	(Republic of Ireland) James Fennelly	(Republic of Ireland) Drogheda, Ireland
2007	(Northern Ireland) Dave Warner (2)	(Northern Ireland) Gary Mckelvey	(Northern Ireland) Brian McMullan	Armagh, Northern Ireland
2006	(Northern Ireland) Dave Warner	(Northern Ireland) Gary Mckelvey	(Northern Ireland) Nigel Troy	(Republic of Ireland) Letterkenny, Ireland
2005	(Northern Ireland) Brian Irwin (2)	(Republic of Ireland) Paul Roberts	(Republic of Ireland) Pat McNamara	Belfast, Northern Ireland
2004	(Northern Ireland) Brian Irwin	(Republic of Ireland) Martin Campbell	(Northern Ireland) Stephen Gracey	Bangor, Northern Ireland
2003	(Republic of Ireland) Martin Campbell (2)	(Republic of Ireland) Rodney Fullerton	(Republic of Ireland) Stephen Gracey	(Republic of Ireland) County Wicklow, Ireland
2002	(Republic of Ireland) Phil Porter	(Republic of Ireland) Martin Campbell	(Republic of Ireland) Francis Kirby	Ballymoney, Northern Ireland
2001	(Republic of Ireland) Andrew Sheehan	(Republic of Ireland) Tom Mulholland	(Republic of Ireland) Martin Campbell	(Republic of Ireland) County Wicklow, Ireland
2000	(Republic of Ireland) Martin Campbell	(Republic of Ireland) Mark Yates	(Republic of Ireland) Frances Kirby	Glenarm, Northern Ireland

==== Northern Ireland (Ulster) Strongest Man/Ulster's Strongest Man ====
Year	Champion	Runner-up	3rd Place	Location
2009	(Northern Ireland) Dave Warner (2)	(Northern Ireland) Bertie Clark	(Northern Ireland) Jonathan Kelly	(Northern Ireland) Castlederg
2008	(Northern Ireland) Francis Kirby (4)	(Northern Ireland) Gary Mckelvey	(Northern Ireland) Brian McMullan	(Northern Ireland) Holywood
2007	(Northern Ireland) Dave Warner	(Northern Ireland) Gary Mckelvey	TBC	(Northern Ireland) Holywood
2006	(Northern Ireland) Francis Kirby (3)	(Northern Ireland) Dave Warner	(Northern Ireland) Gary Mckelvey	(Northern Ireland) Craigavon
2005	(Northern Ireland) Brian Irwin (2)	(Northern Ireland) Francis Kirby	(Northern Ireland) Gary Mckelvey	(Northern Ireland) Carrickfergus
2004	(Northern Ireland) Brian Irwin	(Northern Ireland) Stephen Gracey	(Northern Ireland) Martin Tweedle	(Northern Ireland) Carrickfergus
2003	(Northern Ireland) Francis Kirby (2)	(Northern Ireland) Rodney Fulerton	(Northern Ireland) Martin Campbell	(Northern Ireland) Carrickfergus
2002	(Northern Ireland) Francis Kirby	(Northern Ireland) Phil Porter	(Northern Ireland) Martin Campbell	(Northern Ireland) Portrush
2001	(Northern Ireland) Patrick Deery	(Northern Ireland) Sean Keeley	(Northern Ireland) Francis Kirby	(Northern Ireland) Bangor
2000	(Northern Ireland) Glenn Ross (6)	TBC	TBC	TBC
1999	(Northern Ireland) Glenn Ross (5)	TBC	TBC	TBC
1998	(Northern Ireland) Glenn Ross (4)	TBC	TBC	TBC
1997	(Northern Ireland) Glenn Ross (3)	TBC	TBC	TBC
1996	(Northern Ireland) Glenn Ross (2)	TBC	TBC	TBC
1995	(Northern Ireland) Glenn Ross	TBC	TBC	TBC

==== Republic of Ireland's Strongest Man ====
Year	Champion	Runner-up	3rd Place	Location
2012	(Republic of Ireland) James Fennelly (4)	(Republic of Ireland) Paul Roberts	(Republic of Ireland) Nicky Whelan	TBC
2011	(Republic of Ireland) James Fennelly (3)	(Republic of Ireland) Keith Maher	(Republic of Ireland) Nicky Whelan	TBC
2010	(Republic of Ireland) James Fennelly (2)	(Republic of Ireland) Martin Gallen	(Republic of Ireland) Eoin Shanahan	(Republic of Ireland) Cork
2009	(Republic of Ireland) James Fennelly	(Republic of Ireland) Daniel Gannon	(Republic of Ireland) Eoin Shanahan	TBC
2008	(Republic of Ireland) Jason Reilly (3)	(Republic of Ireland) Daniel Gannon	(Republic of Ireland) Ross Tweedy	TBC
2007	(Republic of Ireland) Jason Reilly (2)	TBC	TBC	TBC
2006	(Republic of Ireland) Jason Reilly	(Republic of Ireland) Pat McNamara	(Republic of Ireland) Daniel Troy	TBC
2005	(Republic of Ireland) Carl Waitoa	(Republic of Ireland) Paul Roberts	(Republic of Ireland) Christopher Bowe	TBC
2004	(Republic of Ireland) Paul Roberts	(Republic of Ireland) Carl Waitoa	(Republic of Ireland) Jason Reilly	TBC
2003	(Republic of Ireland) Ray O'Dwyer	(Republic of Ireland) Kevin Murray	(Republic of Ireland) Pat McNamara	TBC
2002	(Republic of Ireland) Kevin Murray	(Republic of Ireland) Paul Roberts	(Republic of Ireland) Pat McNamara	TBC
2001	(Republic of Ireland) Andrew Sheehan	(Republic of Ireland) Ray O'Dwyer	(Republic of Ireland) Martin Keogh	TBC

==== Other Regional ====
- CNP Professional Strongman Premier League
- Midland's Strongest Man
- Mighty Midlander
- Corby Great Strength Eccleston
- East Britain Strongest Man
- North of England Strongest Man
- Yorkshire's Strongest Man

== See also ==
- Strength athletics
