= Roger Snipes =

British bodybuilder

- Professional bodybuilder

Personal info
- Born: 5 February 1979 (age 47); North Middlesex Hospital, Edmonton

Best statistics
- Height: 5 ft 11 in (1.80 m)
- Weight: (In Season): 220lb/100kg (Off Season): 229lb/104kg

Professional (Pro) career
- Pro-debut: Mister UK 2010
- Best win: Mr. Britannia 2010 Musclemania 2011 Fame UK 2011 WBFF European Championship 2013 WBFF World Championship 2015

Roger Snipes (born 5 February 1979) is a British bodybuilder, Fitness model, fitness competitor and fitness trainer. He is winner of Mr. UK, Mr. Britannia in 2010 and Fame UK in 2011. He followed it up with a win at Musclemania 2011. He won the WBFF European Championship in 2013 and took second place in the WBFF World Championship 2015. He has been a Shredz, PhD athlete and WBFF Pro Muscle Model.

== Career ==
Snipes won his debut competition, the Mister UK, in July 2010. He has competed male pageant the Mr. Britannia in 2010 and stood first place and won the Fame UK in 2011. Snipes won the Musclemania, Qualifier 1st place under 85 kg Body Building. He completed the Musclemania British Championship final, first place and overall winner gaining a pro card. After Musclemania stage winning the heavy weight class in a qualifier, he obtained sponsorship by PhD Nutrition, a supplement and nutrition brand in UK.

In November 2013, he competed as a Muscle Model, took first place in WBFF European Championship, and won his pro card. Snipes stood in second place in the 2015 WBFF World Championship. Snipes also conducted a fitness educational seminar in Hyderabad, India.

== Statistics ==
- Height: 5'ft 11 inch
- Weight: 199 lbs
- Neck: 17
- Chest: 46
- Waist: 32

== Contest history/Competitive Placings ==
- Mr. UK 2010, 1st place - Model
- Mr. Britannia 2010, 1st place - Model
- Muscle mania 2011, Qualifier 1st place - under 85 kg Body Building
- Fame UK 2011/Miami pro – 1st place - Muscle model
- Musclemania British championship final – 1st place and Overall - over 85 kg- Body Building
- Musclemania Universe – Top 10 – Heavy weight - Body building
- WBFF European Championship 2013, 1st Place – Muscle model
- WBFF World Championship 2015, 2nd place – Muscle Model

== See also ==
- List of British bodybuilders
- List of male professional bodybuilders
