= Darren Sadler =

British strength athlete (born 1980)

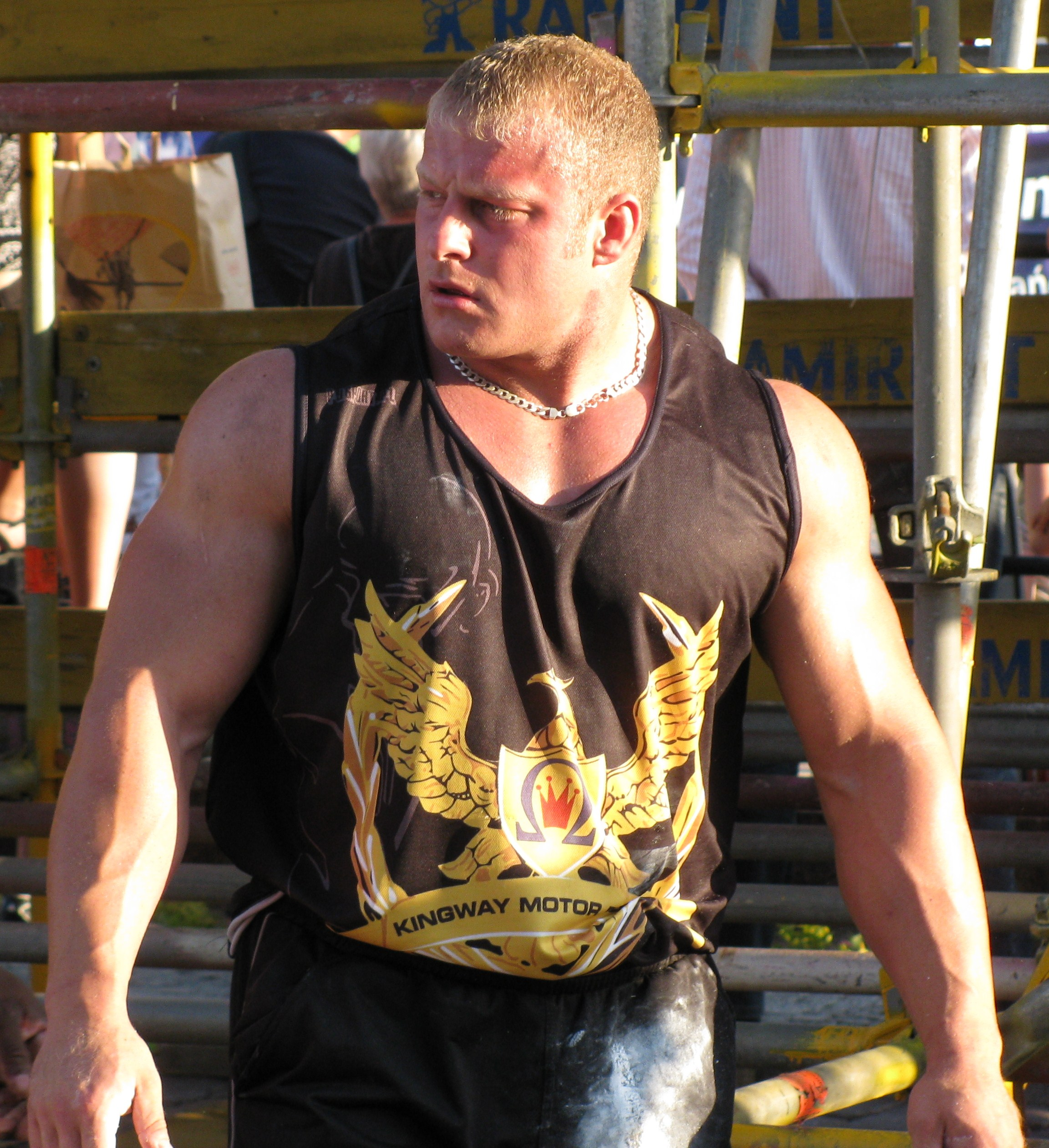
- Born: 22 March 1980 (age 45); Boroughbridge, England
- Other names: Pocket Rocket
- Occupation: Strongman
- Height: 5 ft 8 in (1.73 m)

Competition record

Strongman

Representing United Kingdom

World's Strongest Man
Qualified	2006 World's Strongest Man	
Qualified	2007 World's Strongest Man	
Qualified	2009 World's Strongest Man	
Qualified	2010 World's Strongest Man	

Representing England

Britain's Strongest Man
3rd	Britain's Strongest Man 2007	

England's strongest man (WSM)
3rd	England's Strongest Man 2009	

IFSA Under 105kg World Championships
2nd	2005	
1st	2006 (called World Strongman Challenge)	

IFSA England's Strongest Man under 105kg
1st	2005	

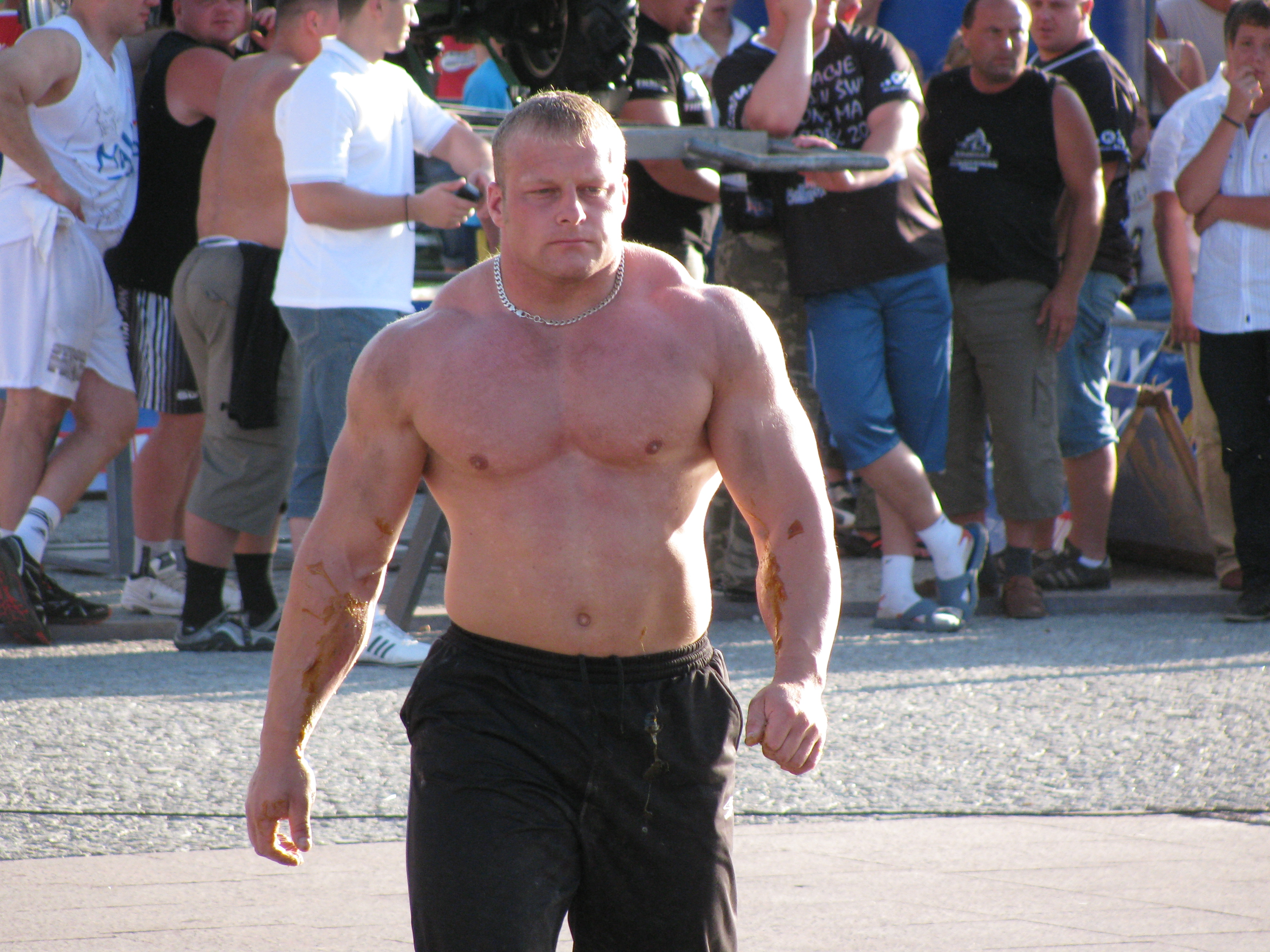
During the Giants Live 2009 Poland event.

Darren Sadler (born 22 March 1980) is a British former strongman competitor. Winner of the World Strongman Challenge in the under 105 kg category, he is notable for being a repeat competitor at the World's Strongest Man despite his comparatively small stature.

He is the co-founder of the Giant's Live arena tour together with Colin Bryce.

== Early life ==
Darren Sadler was born on 22 March 1980 in Boroughbridge and attended Boroughbridge High School.

== Strongman career ==
Sadler began training in the gym at the age of seventeen, but it was not until he was eighteen when he was approached by former World's Strongest Man competitor, Dave Warner, that he began to compete in strongman competitions.

In 2009, Sadler said that "At first I was the youngest and the lightest person, but I did work at it. Now I come in the top few in the country every year." However, when the IFSA showcased a light division class for strongmen in the mid-2000s, Sadler rose to eminence in the field.

In 2005, Sadler not only won the English under 105 kg championships, but went on to place first in the world championships in 2006. In 2006, still in the light division, he won the IFSA World Strongman Challenge. Such was his ability that despite his weight and height, in a sport where men of 6' 1" have been described as "short", he was invited to compete in the main division and began to rise up the rankings against the very best in the world.

In 2006, Sadler secured an invite to the World's Strongest Man (WSM). Here, he was noted for producing "unbelievable performances for a guy his size." In 2007, he came third in the Britain's Strongest Man finals after Terry Hollands and Mark Felix, who had both been in the top four athletes in the world at one stage. He was again invited to the WSM and was just short of making it into the top ten finalists. He has been quoted as saying his greatest achievement in strongman is qualifying for the 2006, 2007, 2009, and 2010 WSM competitions.

In 2008, at the Britain's Strongest Man finals where Sadler was hoping to improve on his third-place finish in 2007, he tore a hamstring. This led to a self-imposed absence in 2008, in which time he concentrated on setting up a business. However, a third invite to WSM was secured with a third-place finish in the WSM qualifying version of England's Strongest Man, which replaced the Britain's Strongest Man competition in 2009 as a WSM qualifier, the latter not being held.

Sadler's favourite event is the Conan's Wheel, with his least favourite being the Deadlift Hold. Additionally, his height hinders his performance in the Atlas Stones. Sadler has said that of the former greats he most admires as Jón Páll Sigmarsson, alongwith Mariusz Pudzianowski and Derek Poundstone also who inspired him.

== Outside of strongman ==
In 2008, Sadler bought a gym in his hometown of Boroughbridge. He opened it in 2008 under the name of Absolute Fitness, and although his name has an attraction for "musclemen and fitness fanatics", he stressed that he wanted it to be an all-round gym for all ages and sexes.

== Personal records ==
- Deadlift – 400 kg (882 lb)
- Squat – 380 kg (838 lb)

Preceded by Janne Hartikainen	IFSA Under 105k World Champion Strongman; 2006	Succeeded by Janne Hartikainen
