= Chris Gearing =

British athlete and strongman

Personal information
- Born: 30 September 1986 (age 39) Chatham, Kent, England
- Occupation(s): Athlete & Strongman
- Height: 6 ft 2 in (1.88 m)
- Weight: 25 st (350 lb; 160 kg)

Sport
- Club: Belgrave Harriers
Medal record
Strongman
Representing United Kingdom
World's Strongest Man
Qualified	2012 World's Strongest Man
Britain's Strongest Man
3rd	2012
UK's Strongest Man
3rd	2012
Britain's Most Powerful Man
2nd	2009
England's Strongest Man
1st	England's Strongest Man 2012 (UKSC)
3rd	England's Strongest Man 2014 (UKSC)
UK Team Championships
2nd	2009 (with Jay Hughes)

Chris Gearing (born 11 December 1986) is a British strongman competitor, notable for having won the England's Strongest Man title and having competed at the World's Strongest Man.

== Biography ==
Chris Gearing was born in Chatham, Kent. He was athletic as a child and at the age of 13 started training in Shot Put going on to compete in the World Under 18s, World Juniors, European Juniors, and winning a silver and a bronze at the Commonwealth Games under 19's in Australia. When he was 23 he began powerlifting and won British titles and came second in the World Junior 140 kg+ category. The next year he began training specifically for Strongman. He was also guided in his training by Steve Winters and Paul Woods (the ex UK 105 kg champion).

In 2009 he placed second in Britain's Most Powerful Man, and also came second in the UK Team Championships with Jay Hughes. However, it was not until 2012 that he began to make impression in the blue ribbon events of British strength athletics. In 2012 he secured a 3rd place finish behind World's Strongest Man competitors Laurence Shahlaei and Terry Hollands at Britain's Strongest Man and he went on to win the UKSC sponsored England's Strongest Man title. He then emulated his BSM performance at the UK's Strongest Man by finishing third once more. His placing at Britain's Strongest Man qualified him for the World's Strongest Man finals in 2012. He competed at WSM, though did not make it past the qualifying rounds.

As a weightlifter his best lifts are 400 kg in the Deadlift, he has Log Pressed 170 kg and he also completed a 385 kg Squat in competition.

Achievements
Preceded by Eddy Hall	England's Strongest Man (UKSC); 2012	Succeeded by Eddy Hall
