= Ben Kelsey =

Ben Kelsey may refer to:

- Benjamin Kelsey (1813–1889), California pioneer
- Benjamin S. Kelsey (1906–1981), U.S. Air Corps fighter projects officer
- Ben Kelsey (strongman) (born 1984), English strength athlete
