= Bill Pittuck =

Personal information
- Born: Bill Pittuck; 13 July 1963 (age 63) London, England
- Occupation: Strongman
- Height: 5 ft 11 in (1.80 m)
Medal record
Strongman
Representing United Kingdom
World's Strongest Man
Qualified	1995 World's Strongest Man
Qualified	1996 World's Strongest Man
Qualified	1999 World's Strongest Man
World Muscle Power
4th	World Muscle Power 1993
5th	World Muscle Power 1994
3rd	World Muscle Power 1995
4th	World Muscle Power 1996
3rd	World Muscle Power 1999
World's Strongest Team
1st	1995
UK's Strongest Man
2nd	UK's Strongest Man 1992
1st	UK's Strongest Man 1993
2nd	UK's Strongest Man 1994
3rd	UK's Strongest Man 1997
Britain's Strongest Man
1st	Britain's Strongest Man 1994
1st	Britain's Strongest Man 1995
5th	Britain's Strongest Man 1999
7th	Britain's Strongest Man 2000
Qualified	Britain's Strongest Man 2001
3rd	Britain's Strongest Man 2002
6th	Britain's Strongest Man 2003
Qualified	Britain's Strongest Man 2004
UK Strongman Docklands Challenge
1st	1999
England's Strongest Man
1st	England's Strongest Man 1991
1st	England's Strongest Man 2001
1st	England's Strongest Man 2002
2nd	England's Strongest Man 2003
British Muscle Power
1st	British Muscle Power 1993
1st	British Muscle Power 1995
European Muscle Power
3rd	European Muscle Power 1993

Bill Pittuck (born 13 July 1963) is a British strongman competitor, notable for having won both major British titles and having been a repeat competitor at the World's Strongest Man, as well as achieving a high standing in the World Muscle Power Classic.

== Biography ==
Bill Pittuck rose to prominence in the early 1990s. His first experience of World's Strongest Man was as a coach when at the 1990 World's Strongest Man, alongside Geoff Capes he trained Adrian Smith. He promised at that event that one day he would come back in his own right and between then and 1995 he trained and competed prolifically. Bill went on to win England's Strongest Man in 1991, two British Muscle Power titles, the title of UK's Strongest Man and was also crowned Britain's Strongest Man in 1994. Combined with consistently strong performances against the best in Europe in the European Muscle Power Classic tournament and against the best in the world at the World Muscle Power Classic championships where he finished fourth in 1993 and fifth in 1994 meant that he was eventually invited to the 1995 World's Strongest Man contest. In that same year he was placed third in the World Muscle Power, underlying his international reputation. In 1996 he again qualified for the 1996 World's Strongest Man and placed fourth at the World Muscle Power Classic. He competed little in 1997 and 1998, but returned in to compete once more at 1999 World's Strongest Man, and once again was third in the World Muscle Power Classic. In 2001 and 2002, Bill won England's Strongest Man, and came second to the internationally renowned world champion bodybuilder and strongman, Eddy Ellwood, in 2003.

Preceded by Gary Taylor/Forbes Cowan	Britain's Strongest Man; 1994	Succeeded by Forbes Cowan
Preceded by Adrian Smith	UK's Strongest Man; 1993	Succeeded by Tommy Smith
