= Fraser Tranter =

British strongman competitor (born 1965)

Personal information
- Born: Fraser G Tranter; 1 December 1965 (age 60) Wolverhampton, England
- Occupation(s): Strongman, Security Guard
- Height: 6 ft 6 in (1.98 m)
Medal record
Strongman
Representing England
World's Strongest Man
Qualified	1998 World's Strongest Man
UK Strongman Docklands Challenge
3rd	1997
2nd	1998
British Muscle Power Championship
4th	British Muscle Power Championship 1998
Birmingham's Strongest Man
1st	1995
1st	1996

Fraser Tranter (born 1 December 1965) is a British strongman competitor, most notable for his appearance at the 1998 World's Strongest Man, as well as his podium finishes in the 1997 and 1998 UK Strongman Docklands Challenge, a national strength athletics competition which at the time held equivalent status to Britain's Strongest Man.

== Early life ==
Fraser Tranter was born in 1965 in Wolverhampton to Douglas Tranter and his wife Janet (née Simpson). He is the oldest of two siblings, having a younger sister Helen Louise born in 1967.

== Strongman career ==
As a strongman, Fraser began to come to national attention after winning the 1995 and 1996 Birmingham's strongest man contests. In 1997 he was invited to compete at the UK Docklands Strongman Challenge, which attracted most of the big names in British strength athletics. This was at a time when the Britain's Strongest Man ("BSM") competition was not being televised but the UK Docklands Strongman Challenge was. Combining the television audience with the calibre of strongmen competing made the status of the UK Docklands Strongman Challenge comparable to the BSM. In May 1998, a win in the Farmer's Walk helped Fraser towards a 2nd-place finish in the UK Docklands Strongman Challenge, and this in turn led to an invite to the 1998 World's Strongest Man in Morocco. Fraser did not progress past the heats in these finals. 1998 also saw Fraser get a 4th-place finish in the British Musclepower championships.

Fraser went on to represent Great Britain in Finland and in South Africa and his other strength athletic achievements include becoming a Guinness Book of Records record holder in the 24hr Team Bench-press and the British Record Holder in the Farmer's Walk ("110 kg each hand category over 100 metres"), completed in 48 seconds.

== Career ==
Fraser established Secur-IT in the 1990s, a firm specialising in the supply of high calibre security personnel to cover a wide range of clients and companies, which have included clients such as Empire Cinemas, Nissan Cars, Holiday Inn, and Aston Martin (Stratstone), as well as a number of celebrity clients.

== Personal life ==
In 1998, Fraser married Maria Govueia Caires and their son James Alexander was born in 2000.
