= Mark Westaby =

British strongman (born 1965)

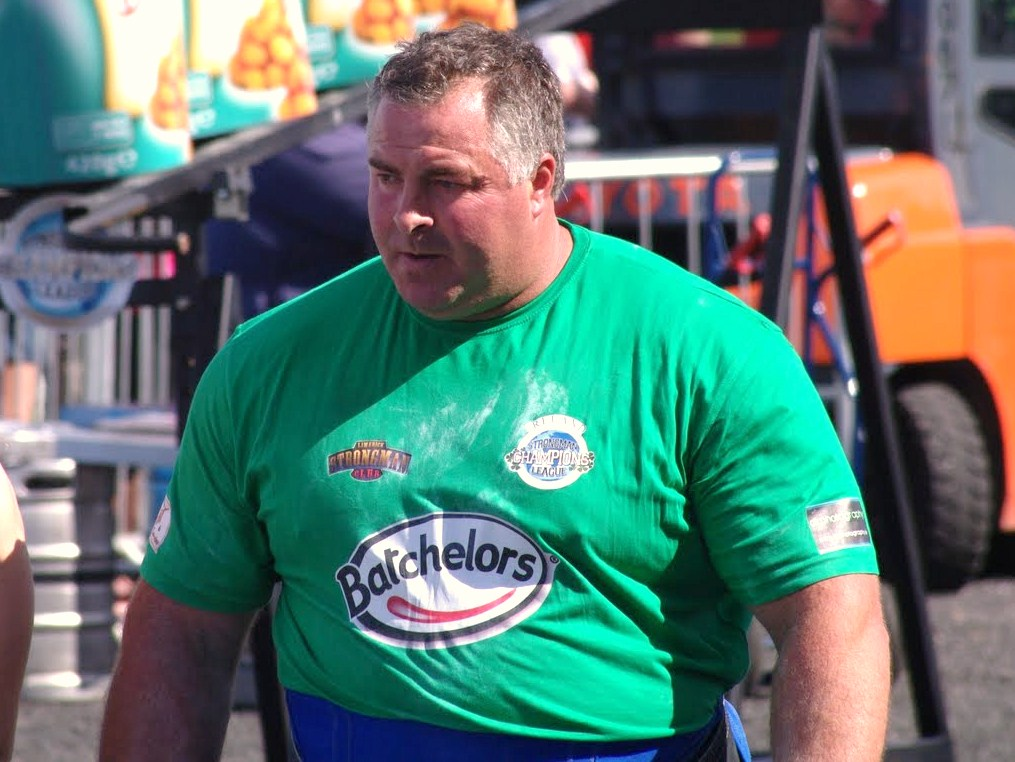
- Westaby (2010)

Personal information
- Born: 17 April 1965 (age 61) Healaugh, Tadcaster England
- Occupations: Strongman, Farmer
- Height: 6 ft 5 in (1.96 m)
Medal record
Strongman
Representing United Kingdom
World's Strongest Man
| Qualified | 2007 World's Strongest Man |
| Qualified | 2010 World's Strongest Man |
Representing England
Britain's Strongest Man
| 5th | Britain's Strongest Man 2006 |
| 5th | Britain's Strongest Man 2007 |
| 5th | Britain's Strongest Man 2008 |
UK's Strongest Man
| 3rd | 2009 |
England's Strongest Man
| 2nd | England's Strongest Man 2009 (UKSC) |

Mark Westaby (born 17 April 1965) is a British strongman competitor, notable for being a repeat competitor at the World's Strongest Man.

== Biography ==
Julian Mark Westaby was born in 1965 in Healaugh, near Tadcaster. He attended Tadcaster Grammar School before becoming a farmer. Mark Westaby's entry into the world of strength athletics was unlike any other of his counterparts. Rather than come into the sport from another sporting career, such as powerlifting, field athletics or weightlifting, or have been a focussed strength athlete, Mark simply wandered across a local strongman contest in 2003, entered it and won.

His rise to the highest levels of British strength athletics was fast and by 2006 he had won Adrian Rollinson's Might Midlander contest. He featured prominently in Britain's Strongest Man in 2007, coming fifth overall and even secured a place at the 2007 World's Strongest Man finals. In 2008 he also came fifth in Britain's Strongest Man, and in 2009 came second in England's Strongest Man to the soon to be WSM finalist Laurence Shahlaei. He went on to claim third spot in 2009's UK's Strongest Man. In the latter end of 2009 he placed fifth in the Winter Giants event, organised by Denny Felix (wife of Mark Felix).

In 2010 he won the regional finals of the England’s Strongest Man contest held in Barnard Castle, but did not feature in the finals of England's Strongest Man. Also in 2010 at the Bodypower Expo at the NEC in Birmingham, he won the strongman competition also organised by Denny Felix, and in so doing earned an invitation to the Strongman Champions League - Ireland competition where he came sixth.

Outside of strongman, he still runs a smallholding, as well as a landscaping business which he said keeps him fit.
