= Adrian Rollinson =

British strongman competitor (born 1965)

Personal information
- Born: 1965 (age 60–61) Dudley, Worcestershire, England
- Occupation(s): Strongman, Bodybuilder
- Height: 6 ft 4 in (1.93 m)
Medal record
Strongman
Representing United Kingdom
World's Strongest Man
Qualified	2000 World's Strongest Man
Qualified	2001 World's Strongest Man
Qualified	2003 World's Strongest Man
Qualified	2004 World's Strongest Man
Representing England
Britain's Strongest Man
3rd	Britain's Strongest Man 2001
2nd	Britain's Strongest Man 2004
3rd	Britain's Strongest Man 2005
Iceland's Strongest Man
2nd	2005 (guest)
England's Strongest Man
3rd	England's Strongest Man 2002

Adrian Rollinson (born 1965) is a British strongman competitor, notable for being a repeat competitor at the World's Strongest Man.

== Biography ==
Adrian Rollinson was born in 1965 in Dudley. He came to prominence in strongman circles relatively late when he made the finals of Britain's Strongest Man in 1999, though he did not earn a place on the podium. In 2000 he won a Geoff Capes UK Strongest Man heat to qualify for the UK's Strongest Man 2000 show. For a long while, the top five placed athletes from Britain's Strongest Man qualified for the finals of the World's Strongest Man and Rollinson found himself thrown in with the world's best in 2000 at the finals in South Africa. He appeared three more times in the WSM, after strong finishes in Britain's Strongest Man ("BSM"). In 2004 he came second in the BSM but ironically came closer to the title in 2005, at which he finished third. In this 2005 BSM, the title was decided by the three top scoring competitors racing in a Farmer's Walk event. Rollinson had dominated the entire competition prior to that, being the only man to complete the Atlas Stones and having pressed 9 reps on the log press. However, for the top three, prior points were discarded in favour of the Farmer's Walk . Mick Gosling won the event and Rollinson, not known for his speed, came third. This would prove to be his final BSM. In addition to these major competitions, Rollinson also took second spot in the Iceland's Strongest Man tournament as a guest. After his retirement he remains active as a promoter of tournaments, notably the nationally renowned "Mighty Midlander" contest.

Outside of strongman, Rollinson worked as a roadworker in his native Dudley. He landed a role as a Gyptian bodyguard in 2007 in the movie, The Golden Compass, the Hollywood adaptation of the first in Philip Pullman's trilogy, His Dark Materials. He filmed five scenes in London just before Christmas 2007 but did not meet the principle stars Daniel Craig or Nicole Kidman. He did film with Eva Green, Tom Courtenay and Jim Carter.
