= Boroughbridge High School =

Location
- Wetherby Road; Boroughbridge, North Yorkshire, YO51 9JX; England; 54.08860°N 1.39487°W

Information
- Type: Community school
- Established: 1982
- Local authority: North Yorkshire Council
- Department for Education URN: 121699 Tables
- Ofsted: Reports
- Headteacher: Kathryn Stephenson
- Gender: Mixed
- Age: 11 to 18
- Enrolment: Approximately 690
- Last Ofsted report: December 2016
- Website: www.boroughbridgehigh.com

Boroughbridge High School is a mixed, nonselective, state secondary school in Boroughbridge, North Yorkshire, England.

The school was awarded arts specialist status in September 2003. The School's 2009 Ofsted Inspection report rated the school as Grade 2 (good).

== Ofsted inspections ==
Since the commencement of Ofsted inspections in September 1993, the school has undergone six inspections:

Date of inspection	Outcome	Reference
16–20 October 1995	Outstanding	N/A
20 November 2000	Satisfactory	Report
1–2 December 2005	Satisfactory	Report
8–9 January 2009	Good	Report
8–9 February 2012	Good	Report
13 December 2016	Good	Report

== Notable former pupils ==
- Darren Sadler, strongman and former under-105k World Champion
