= Dean Slater =

- Born: Dean Slater; 20 July 1974 (age 50); Warwickshire, Great Britain
- Occupation: Strongman
- Height: 185 cm (6 ft 1 in)

Competition record

Strongman

Representing United Kingdom

England's Strongest Man
1st	England's Strongest Man 2010 (UKSC)	

Midlands Strongest Man
1st	2005	
1st	2008	
1st	2010	

Dean Slater (born 1974) is a British strongman competitor, notable for having won the England's Strongest Man title in 2010.

== Biography ==
Dean Slater was born in Warwickshire, England. He began strongman competition at the age of 28 in 2002. By 2005 he had won his first regional title, Midland's Strongest Man. He repeated this feat in 2008 and 2010. In 2010 he also won the UKSC version of the England's Strongest Man title.

Preceded by Laurence Shahlaei (Elite/UKSC)	England's Strongest Man (UKSC); 2010	Succeeded by Eddy Hall
