= James Fennelly =

Irish strength athlete

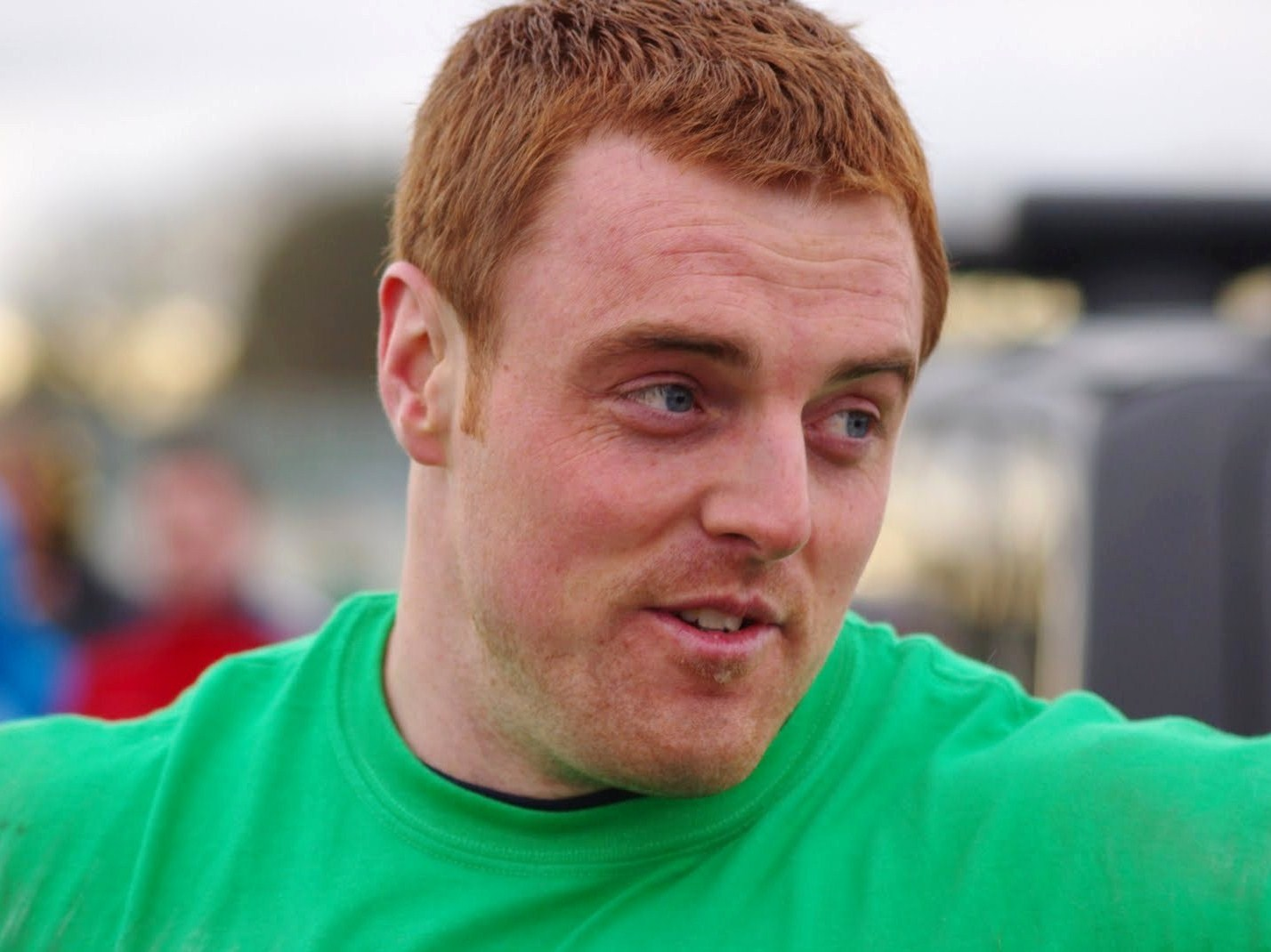
- James Fennelly

Personal information
- Nationality: (Republic of Ireland) Irish
- Height: 1.91 m (6 ft 3 in)
- Weight: 125 kg (276 lb)

James Fennelly is a native of County Kilkenny, Ireland.

James began weight training at 17. Over the years Fennelly won a number of Junior titles and holds the Junior World Deadlift record of 320 kg. He trained solid for six years concentrating on Powerlifting and then branching into Strongman. Prior to joining the international strongman circuit he was an electrician.

He has won Republic of Ireland's Strongest Man 4 times. and he has twice won Ireland's Strongest Man.

In March 2013, he featured on The Late Late Show on Irish television.
