= Russ Bradley =

British strongman

Personal information
- Born: Russell Geoffrey Bradley; 17 November 1965 (age 60) Worcester, England
- Occupation(s): Strongman, Builder
- Height: 6 ft 4 in (1.93 m)
Medal record
Strongman
Representing England
World's Strongest Man
| Qualified | 1998 |
| Qualified | 1997 |
Britain's Strongest Man
| 1st | Britain's Strongest Man 1996 |
| 2nd | Britain's Strongest Man 1998 |
| 6th | Britain's Strongest Man 2000 |
UK's Strongest Man
| 3rd | 1997 |
UK Strongman Docklands Challenge
| 1st | 1998 |
British Muscle Power Championship
| 1st | British Muscle Power Championship 1997 |
| 1st | British Muscle Power Championship 1998 |

Russ Bradley (born 17 November 1965) is a British strongman competitor, notable for his appearance at the 1997 World's Strongest Man, multiple British strength titles and his numerous Guinness world records.
