= Rob Dixon (strength athlete) =

British strength athlete

Personal information
- Born: Rob Dixon; 13 July 1964 (age 61) York, England
- Occupation: Strongman
Medal record
Strongman
Representing United Kingdom
World's Strongest Man
10th	2000 World's Strongest Man
Qualified	2001 World's Strongest Man
Britain's Strongest Man
1st	Britain's Strongest Man 1997
2nd	Britain's Strongest Man 2001

Rob Dixon (born 1964) is a British former strongman competitor, and a current ultramarathon runner. Dixon is notable for having won the major British title and having been a repeat competitor at the World's Strongest Man.

== Biography ==
Rob Dixon was born in York, Great Britain in 1964. He is a repeat competitor at the World's Strongest Man. He rose to prominence on the strength athletic circuit when he won the 1997 Britain's Strongest Man. Dixon, whilst competing, was living in Sand Hutton and owned the Samson and Delilah's Fitness Centre in Haxby and in Pocklington.

In 2000 he was invited to compete at the World's Strongest Man tournament, in Sun City, South Africa. He came second in his group and thereby made the final of the tournament. However, injury forced him to retire after the second event and he placed tenth. He made a second appearance in 2001, but in a closely fought heat he placed third, just missing out on the final.

Dixon was also heavily involved in furthering the strongman career of Mark Westaby. Westaby, of the York area also, approached Dixon after watching Dixon compete in 2002. Westaby recalled the following:

"I watched Rob and told him afterwards that I fancied giving it a go. I’d not done any sport since the shot putt when I was at school and had been nowhere near a gym but he was stood next to an Atlas stone and said ‘if you can lift that, I’ll train you.’ It was about 150 kg but I did it." Dixon began training Westaby, who would eventually appear a number of times at the World's Strongest Man finals.

Dixon later moved to France to concentrate on snowboarding.

After retiring from strongman, he lost 100 pounds and began running ultramarathons for charity. In July 2016, he ran The Wolds Way (79 miles) in 14 hours 56 minutes.

Preceded by Russ Bradley	Britain's Strongest Man; 1997	Succeeded by Jamie Reeves
