= Mick Gosling =

Personal information
- Born: Mick Gosling; 24 March 1972 (age 54) Stoke, England
- Occupation: Strongman
- Height: 6 ft 4 in (1.93 m)
Medal record
Strongman
Representing United Kingdom
World's Strongest Man
Qualified	2002 World's Strongest Man
Qualified	2005 World's Strongest Man
Representing England
Britain's Strongest Man
1st	Britain's Strongest Man 2005
UK's Strongest Man
3rd	UK's Strongest Man 2001

Mick Gosling (born 24 March 1972) is famous for being the winner of Britain's Strongest Man contest in 2005. He is the brother of fellow strongman and former holder of the title "Britain's Strongest Man", Richard Gosling.

== Stafford Superior Strongman ==
In 2007 Mick Gosling approached Stafford Borough Council in order to try to promote a strongman competition in the area and to raise its profile amongst the young. The result was the Stafford Superior Strongman 2007 held at Rowley Park, Stafford. The event was well received and well attended by some of the foremost British strongmen of the time. There were 18 competitors, some men having competed at past World's Strongest Man competitions such as Mark Felix (who won the event), Mark Westaby and Laurence Shahlaei. The quality of the event was further enhanced by being overseen by the former British, European and World's Strongest Man, Geoff Capes.

Preceded by Richard Gosling	Britain's Strongest Man; 2005	Succeeded by Oli Thompson
