= Marc Iliffe =

Personal information
- Born: 27 June 1972 London, England
- Died: 11 February 2003 (aged 30) Wellingborough, England
- Occupation: Strongman
- Height: 6 ft 0 in (1.83 m)
Medal record
Strongman
Representing United Kingdom
World's Strongest Man
Qualified	2001 World's Strongest Man
Qualified	2002 World's Strongest Man
Representing England
Britain's Strongest Man
1st	2002

Marc Iliffe (27 June 1972 – 11 February 2003) was a British strongman famous for being the winner of Britain's Strongest Man contest in 2002.

== Career ==
Iliffe was acknowledged as being extremely dedicated to the sport of strength athletics. His training partner of ten years, Bill Pittuck, talked of Marc's particular love of the Atlas stones event which helped him win the title of Britain's Strongest Man in 2002. Iliffe was also invited to compete at the World's Strongest Man finals in consecutive years. Iliffe's career was affected in 2002 by a split disc in his back that had caused weakness in his legs. However, surgery to correct the injury looked very positive. On his personal website he said: "I have now had an MRI scan and the bottom disk in my back is split, so I go into the woodlands private Hospital in Kettering on the 22nd of October to under go [sic] surgery to fix the problem, so I will be back fighting fit very soon and will be at BSM 2003 to hopefully win title for a second time. Can't wait to get it sorted as it has caused problems the last few months, and will be back in training very soon the surgeon say's [sic]. It should not cause me any more problems and is near enough an instant fix, and leg pain and weakness will be gone instantly."

== Television and film ==
As well as televised strongman competitions, Marc appeared in a television advertisement for rock group Pulp's Hits album before Christmas 2002 and had been cast in a film called Transfer by GMV Entertainment along with the boxer Richie Woodhall, in which he was due to play a gangster.

== Personal life ==
Outside of strongman competition, Marc worked at Ilmor Engineering, Brixworth. He was married to June Iliffe, had two stepsons, aged 15 and 19, as well as a six-year-old son, Marc Junior. At the time of his death he lived in Wellingborough in Northamptonshire.

=== Death ===
On 11 February 2003, Marc Iliffe was discovered hanged from gym equipment at his Northamptonshire home in Vivian Road. The Northamptonshire coroner recorded an open verdict on the death of Mr Iliffe, of Wellingborough. No suicide note was left but he was believed to be having some marital and work problems. Additionally, he was disappointed the strongman competition sponsors were not using him in publicity campaigns. His mother, Kathleen Carmichael of Rushden, stated that: "My son wasn't depressed. Frustrated, in turmoil, but not depressed". His wife, June Iliffe, also cast doubt on whether the suicide was deliberate. She did not think he meant to kill himself and she stated "He knew I was going to be home in the next 20 minutes and he wouldn't have wanted his son to find him."

Preceded by Glenn Ross	Britain's Strongest Man; 2002	Succeeded by Richard Gosling
