= Ben Kelsey (strongman) =

Personal information
- Born: 23 September 1984 (age 41) Oxford, England
- Occupation: Strongman Firefighter
- Height: 6 ft 0 in (183 cm)
- Weight: 17.5 st (245 lb; 111 kg)
Medal record
Strongman
Representing United Kingdom
World's Strongest Man
Qualified	2014 World's Strongest Man
World’s Strongest Man under 105kg
1st	2013 World’s Strongest Man under 105kg
Britain's Strongest Man
5th	2014
UK's Strongest Man
2nd	2013
England's Strongest Man
1st	England's Strongest Man 2014 (UKSC)
2nd	England's Strongest Man 2013 (UKSC)

Ben Kelsey (born 23 September 1984) is a British strongman competitor, notable for having won the England's Strongest Man title, the title of World's Strongest Man Under 105 kg and having competed at the World's Strongest Man.

== Biography ==
Ben Kelsey was born in Oxford. As a junior he joined Oxford City Athletic Club and had some success, resulting in an opportunity to represent England as an under 23. He later shifted his focus to strength athletics, first competing in 2010. He did not have to wait long for success, and in 2012 won both England's and Britain's strongest man in the under 105 kg category. He was also named Britain's natural strongest man in 2012 and was the winner of the natural strongman world series in Canada 2012 and Dubai 2013. He continued to compete in the under 105 kg category and in 2013 retained both the England's Strongest Man U105kg and Britain's Strongman U105kg titles. He then went on to be named the World's Strongest Man under 105 kg. This was his last competition in the under 105 kg category before fully transferring to the main circuit. In 2013 he came second in both the UK's Strongest Man and England's Strongest Man competitions. In 2014 he went one better in England's Strongest Man coming first, and his fifth place in the Giants Live sponsored Britain's Strongest Man secured him an invite to the 2014 World's Strongest Man.

== Personal life and career outside sport ==
Kelsey was born in Oxford and remains there working as a full-time firefighter and personal trainer.

Preceded by Eddie Hall	England's Strongest Man (UKSC); 2014	Succeeded by incumbent
