= Paul Smith (strongman) =

English strongman

Personal information
- Nationality: English
- Born: 15 August 1994 (age 31)
- Occupation: Strongman
- Height: 5 ft 11 in (1.80 m)
- Weight: 130–135 kg (287–298 lb)
Medal record
Strongman
Representing United Kingdom and England
World's Strongest Man
Qualified	2018 World's Strongest Man
Qualified	2023 World's Strongest Man
Strongman Champions League
7th	2016 SCL England
8th	2016 SCL Finland
2nd	2022 SCL England
Giants Live
5th	2022 Strongman Classic
7th	2022 World Tour Finals
Arnold Classic League
6th	2022 Arnold UK
Europe's Strongest Man
10th	2023 Europe's Strongest Man
UK's Strongest Man
5th	2017 UK's Strongest Man
4th	2020 UK's Strongest Man
2nd	2021 UK's Strongest Man
1st	2022 UK's Strongest Man
1st	2023 UK's Strongest Man
1st	2024 UK's Strongest Man
3rd	2025 UK's Strongest Man
Britain's Strongest Man
8th	2017 Britain's Strongest Man
5th	2018 Britain's Strongest Man
7th	2019 Britain's Strongest Man
9th	2020 Britain's Strongest Man
8th	2021 Britain's Strongest Man
5th	2022 Britain's Strongest Man
4th	2023 Britain's Strongest Man
8th	2024 Britain's Strongest Man
England's Strongest Man
4th	2023 England's Strongest Man
5th	2025 England's Strongest Man
5th	2026 England's Strongest Man

Paul Smith (born 15 August 1994) is an English Strongman from Oldham, Greater Manchester and a 3x times UK's Strongest Man champion.

== Career ==
Smith was born in Sheffield and played boxing, athletics and parkour during his childhood. When he was fifteen, he started strength training, and competed in his first novice strongman competition a year later. In 2017 he won Ultimate Strongman Junior World Championships held in Canada and participated in his first UK's Strongest Man competition the same year where he won fifth place, and became the champion by 2022 and successfully defended his title in 2023 and 2024. His attempt to win a fourth successive title in 2025 fell short, with Smith placing third behind Chris Beetham and Andrew Flynn.

In his first appearance at World's Strongest Man competition in 2018 held in Manila, Philippines, he participated in the second qualifier group where Brian Shaw and Johan Els made it to the finals. In his second appearance in 2023 he participated in the fifth qualifier group where Trey Mitchell and Evan Singleton made it to the finals.

In 2022 Strongman Champions League England, Smith won second place behind Aivars Šmaukstelis, defeating the likes of Kelvin de Ruiter, Mika Törrö, Travis Ortmayer, Andy Black and Gavin Bilton.

== Personal records ==
- Equipped Deadlift (with straps) – 400 kg (882 lb) (2024 Britain's Strongest Man)
- Log press – 180 kg (397 lb) (2024 Kaos Strongest Man)
- Axle press – 150 kg (331 lb) x 4 reps (2022 Britain's Strongest Man)
- Nicol stones walk – 2 stones weighing 138 kg (304 lb) & 114 kg (251 lb) for 23.10 metres (75 ft 9 in) (2022 Giants Live World Tour Finals) (former world record)
- Atlas stones (heavy set) – 5 stones weighing 120–200 kg (265–441 lb) in 38.38 seconds (2022 Britain's Strongest Man)
- Atlas stones (light set) – 5 stones weighing 100–180 kg (220–397 lb) in 27.37 seconds (2019 Britain's Strongest Man)

== Personal life ==
Paul is married to Shannon, a fellow strongwoman competitor from North Yorkshire and has a B.Sc in Human biology.
