= Forbes Cowan =

Personal information
- Born: Forbes Cowan; 16 October 1964 (age 61) Kilwinning, North Ayrshire, Scotland
- Occupation: Strongman
- Height: 6 ft 4.5 in (1.94 m)
Medal record
Strongman
Representing United Kingdom
World's Strongest Man
5th	1994
5th	1996
World Muscle Power
4th	1993
4th	1994
2nd	1995
1st	1996
Representing Scotland
Europe's Strongest Man
1st	1991
5th	1993
6th	1994
European Muscle Power
1st	1995
Britain's Muscle Power
1st	1993
Britain's Strongest Man
1st	1993
1st	1994
Scotland's Strongest Man
1st	1990
1st	1992
1st	1993
1st	1995
1st	1996
2nd	2002
1st	2003

Forbes Cowan (born 16 October 1964) is a Scottish former strongman competitor and multiple entrant to the World's Strongest Man. Although he never captured the World's Strongest Man title, during the 1990s he was the World Muscle Power champion, Europe's Strongest Man and Britain's Strongest Man, as well as being consistently in the top five in major international competitions.

== Biography ==
Forbes Cowan began his strongman career in 1990 with a win in his inaugural competition as Cunninghame's Strongest Man in May 1990. Having repeated this feat in 1991 he quickly moved into the professional circuit and won Scotland's Strongest Man, the first of six such titles. In 1991, the meteoric career led him to become Europe's Strongest Man, a title he held with World's Strongest Man winner Gary Taylor. In 1993 he won the British Muscle Power Championship and Britain's Strongest Man and was selected as the competition tester and British reserve for the 1993 World's Strongest Man competition in Orange, France.

Forbes Cowan came fourth in the World Muscle Power championship of 1993 and 1994, and in 1995 progressed to second spot, winning this prestigious title in 1996. He took the European Muscle Power title in 1995 in a field that included the great Magnus Ver Magnusson.

Four years into his professional career he was invited to his first World's Strongest Man in 1994 in South Africa where he created a sensation when he won his heat against tough opposition, including the then current title holder Gary Taylor. In the final, he beat the eventual champion Magnus Ver Magnusson in the pole push but sustained a rib injury. He continued through the pain to finish fifth overall. He repeated this finish in 1995, again after sustaining an injury, this time to his back.

His career peaked in 1996, when he won the World Muscle Power title. His career was put on hold in 1997 when he was imprisoned for his involvement in a plot to smuggle cannabis into the UK. Following his release in 2001, he continued to compete but not at the very top international flight.

In addition to strength athletics he was also a renowned Highland Games competitor excelling in caber tossing and throwing 56 lb in weight for height. His throws of 16' 6" in the latter assured his place in the world rankings.

== Personal records ==
- Samson's barrow carry – 9 humans (25m course) in 11.10 seconds (1995 World's Strongest Man, group 4) (World Record)
- Keg toss – 25 kg (55 lb) over 4.90 metres (16 ft 1 in) (1995 Manfred Hoeberl Classic) (former world record)

== Competition record ==
- 1991
  - 1. – Europe's Strongest Man
- 1993
  - 1. – Britain's Strongest Man
  - 5. – Europe's Strongest Man
  - 4. – World Muscle Power
- 1994
  - 6. – Europe's Strongest Man
  - 5. – World's Strongest Man
  - 4. – World Muscle Power
- 1995
  - 1. – Britain's Strongest Man
  - 11. – Europe's Strongest Man
  - 1. – European Muscle Power
  - 2. – World Muscle Power
- 1996
  - 1. – World Muscle Power
  - 12. – Europe's Strongest Man (injured)
  - 5. – World's Strongest Man

== Statistics ==
- Height: 6' 4½"
- Weight: 287 lbs
- Chest: 56"
- Biceps: 20"

== Acting career ==
In 2000, Forbes worked on the film Gladiator as a stuntman.
