= Jimmy Marku =

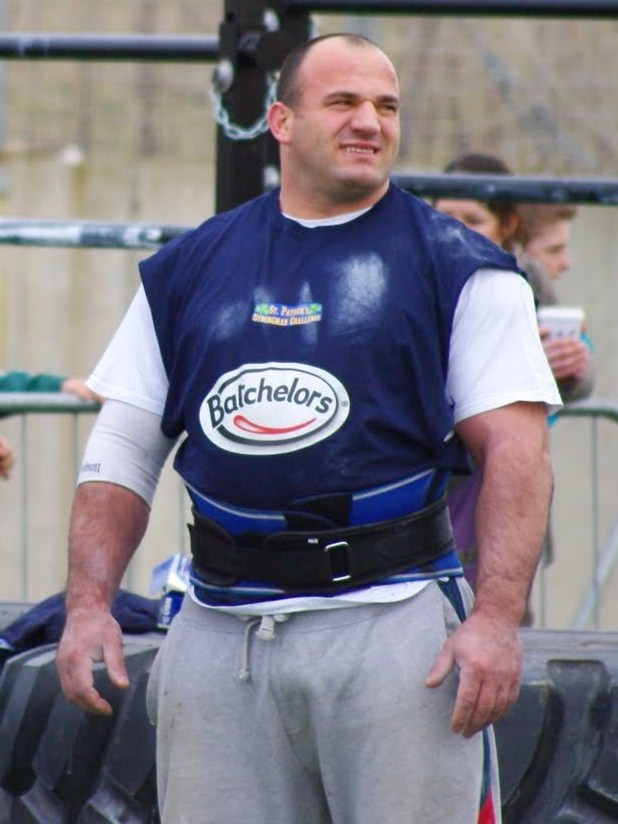

Personal information
- Born: Xhimi Marku; 27 August 1974 (age 51) Tirana, Albania
- Occupation: Strongman
- Height: 5 ft 10 in (1.78 m)
Medal record
Strongman
Representing Great Britain
World's Strongest Man
| Qualified | 2007 World's Strongest Man |
| Qualified | 2008 World's Strongest Man |
| Qualified | 2009 World's Strongest Man |
Representing England
Britain's Strongest Man
| 1st | Britain's Strongest Man 2008 |
UK's Strongest Man
| 3rd | UK's Strongest Man 2006 |
| 2nd | UK's Strongest Man 2007 |
| 3rd | UK's Strongest Man 2008 |
| 1st | UK's Strongest Man 2009 |
England's Strongest Man
| 1st | England's Strongest Man 2006 |
| 1st | England's Strongest Man 2007 |
| 1st | England's Strongest Man 2008 |

Jimmy Marku (Albanian: Xhimi Marku; born 27 August 1974) is an Albanian-born British strongman competitor.

== Early life ==
Jimmy Marku was born 27 August 1974 in Lac, Albania. He then moved to England where he pursued his strongman career.

== Strongman career ==
Marku burst on to the higher echelons of the strongman circuit when he won the England's Strongest Man competition in 2006. He went on to compete at the UK's Strongest Man (known as the "UKSC" because it is run by the UK Strength Council) that year where he came third behind Glenn Ross and Terry Hollands. In 2007 he repeated his feat of winning the England's Strongest Man. In that same year he competed at both the Britain's Strongest Man ("BSM") finals and in the UKSC where he went one better than in 2006, coming second (again to Glenn Ross). That year he participated in the qualifying round of the 2007 World's Strongest Man contest, finishing third by half a point in Group 4 behind the eventual winner Mariusz Pudzianowski and Dave Ostlund.

In 2008 he had his most successful year claiming the England's Strongest Man title once again, and then going on to win the BSM competition, beating the WSM 3rd place holder and defending BSM champion, Terry Hollands. This was despite having been in a car crash only days before. The BSM win secured him an invitation to the 2008 World's Strongest Man contest. In 2008 he also secured third spot in the UKSC.

Marku is known for his crowd pleasing demeanour and has been described as a "Fantastic showman".

== Personal records ==
- Keg drop Squat – 260–340 kg (573–750 lb) x 7 reps in 20.83 seconds (2007 World's Strongest Man, group 4) (World Record)
- Car flip – 800 kg (1,764 lb) x 4 times in 31.16 seconds (2008 Britain's Strongest Man) (World Record)

== Personal life ==
Marku resides in Harrow, Middlesex, England.

On 1 June 2011, Marku was stopped by police who found a large quantity of marijuana in the boot of his car. Police charged him with possession with intent to supply. He was found guilty and sentenced to nine months in prison.

| Preceded by Terry Hollands | Britain's Strongest Man; 2008 | Succeeded by 2012 next competition Laurence Shahlaei |
| Preceded by Adam Townsend | England's Strongest Man; 2006-2008 | Succeeded by Two competitions in 2009: Laurence Shahlaei England's Strongest Man (WSM); Terry Hollands |
| Preceded by Glenn Ross | UK's Strongest Man; 2009 | Succeeded by Glenn Ross |
