= Colin Bryce =

British bobsledder (born 1974)

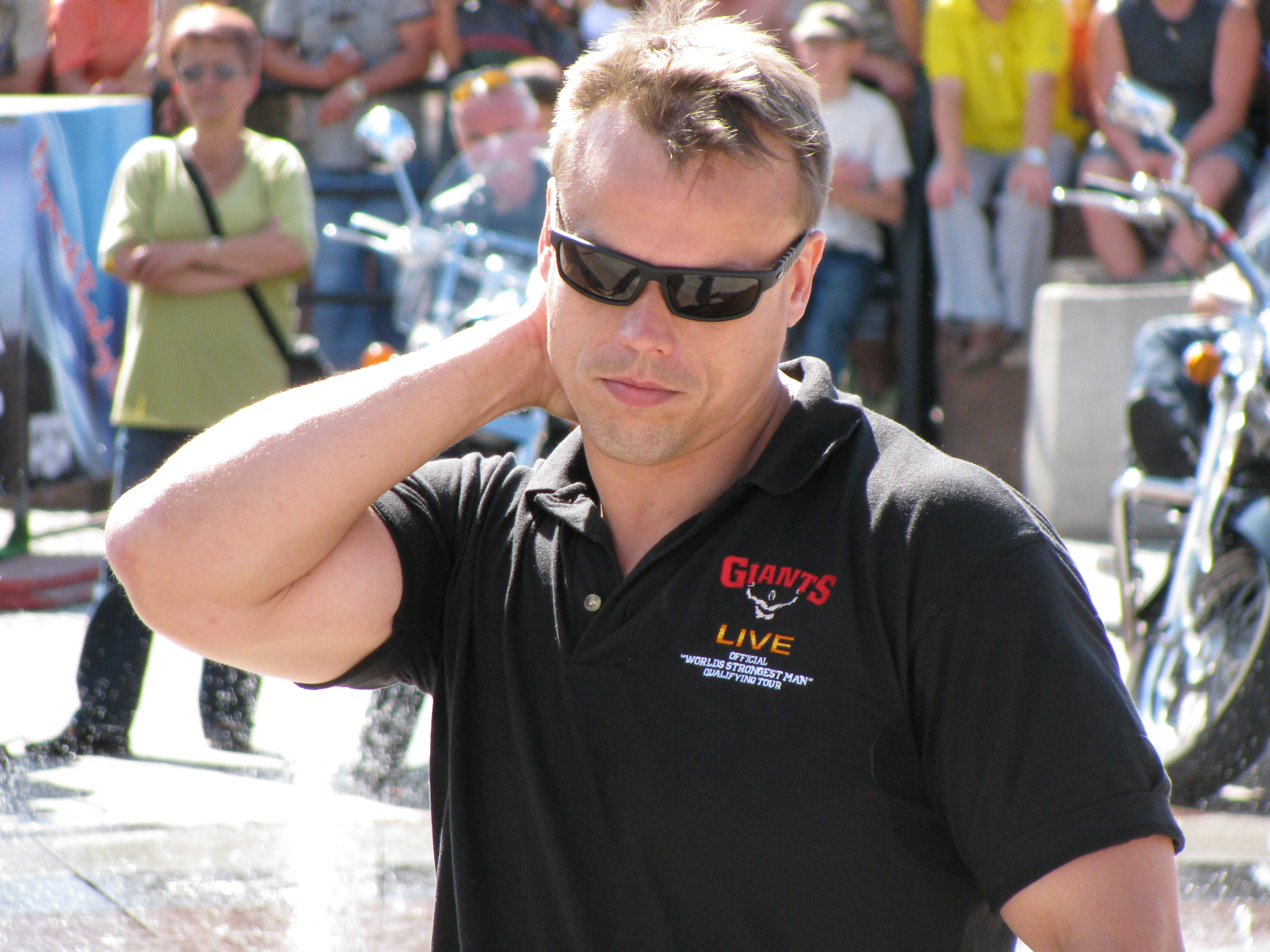
Colin Bryce in 2009.

Colin Bryce (born 4 August 1974), is a British sports producer and television presenter.

Together with Darren Sadler, he co-founded Giants Live strongman arena tour and works as a sports commentator for the BBC, ESPN, Fox Sports, Eurosport, Channel Five, Channel 4 and CBBC. Bryce was a former Olympic bobsledder.

== Early life ==
Although born in Newcastle upon Tyne, Bryce grew up in Craigie, Perthshire. His father Laurie Bryce, was a three-time Commonwealth Games competitor. He also spent six years in the US where he made the Pennsylvania state finals as a wrestler. He is a graduate of the University of Glasgow in Physiology and Sport Science. In recent times Bryce has taken up Tennis.

== Career ==
=== Athlete ===
Having been a reserve at 1997 World's Strongest Man competition, Bryce competed in 1999 Britain's Strongest Man competition, placing seventh out of eight participants.

At the 2002 Winter Olympics in Salt Lake City, he competed in the two-man Bobsleigh alongside Neil Scarisbrick, as the brakeman and finished in 22nd place.

=== Producer and commentator ===
Bryce did refereeing work on TV shows including IMG's World's Strongest Man, ITV's Ant and Dec's Saturday Night Takeaway, BBC's Superstars and CBBC's Airmageddon. His Eurosport work includes commentaries on the World Bobsleigh, Skeleton and Luge tour, the Sydney Olympics, Japanese game show Viking: The Ultimate Obstacle Course, the Nathan's Hot Dog Eating Contest, the Stihl Lumberjack World Championships, K-1 Total Knock Out and the BDO World Darts Championship. He was a BBC commentator at the Winter Olympics in Turin 2006 and Vancouver 2010, working alongside Paul Dickenson. They commentated on the only British medal when Amy Williams took Gold in the Skeleton event.

Since 2003, Bryce presented World Strongest Man qualifying tours and Strongman Super Series, often with former English rugby player Martin Bayfield. In 2009, Bryce launched Giants Live together with Darren Sadler as a World's Strongest Man qualifying Tour. The inaugural show was at the Mohegan Sun Casino and Resort in Connecticut, USA. Also since 2009, Bryce has been involved in the televised coverage of the World's Strongest Man contest competition initially on Bravo and subsequently on Channel 5 in the UK. He also serves as a tournament director for World’s Strongest Man. Bryce also commentated at the 2009 Highlander Challenge which took place at Scone Palace and aired on Channel 4, and 2009 and 2010 Abu Dhabi Adventure Challenge on Eurosport.
