= Glenn Ross =

British strongman

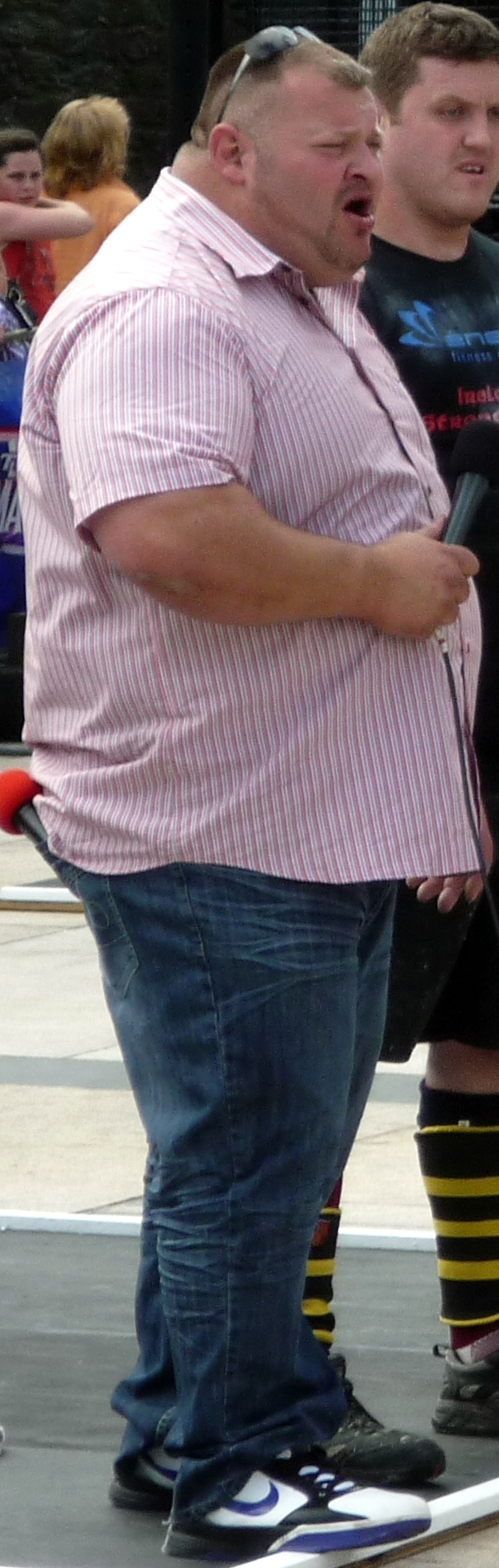
- Ross commentating at Ireland Strongest Man 2011

Personal information
- Nickname: The Daddy
- Nationality: British
- Born: 27 May 1971 (age 55) Bangor, County Down, Northern Ireland
- Height: 6 ft 1 in (185 cm)
- Weight: 215 kg (474 lb)
- Spouse: Yvonne Ross

Sport
- Sport: Strongman
Medal record
Strongman
Representing Northern Ireland and United Kingdom
World's Strongest Man
Qualified	1998 World's Strongest Man
Qualified	1999 World's Strongest Man
Qualified	2000 World's Strongest Man
Qualified	2001 World's Strongest Man
Qualified	2003 World's Strongest Man
Arnold Strongman Classic
3rd	Arnold Strongman Classic 2005
10th	Arnold Strongman Classic 2006
Strongman Champions League
8th	2009 Germany FIBO
6th	2010 Germany
IFSA
11th	1999 Finland Grand Prix
5th	1999 Viking of the North
5th	2000 Ireland Grand Prix
9th	2000 Poland Grand Prix
5th	2000 Czech Grand Prix
World Strongman Cup
4th	2004 Spain
1st	2004 Austria
2nd	2004 Germany
6th	2004 Germany
3rd	2004 Austria
6th	2004 Poland
1st	European Master's Strongmancup 2004
6th	2004 Russia
3rd	2005 Ireland
1st	2005 England
2nd	2005 USA
10th	2005 Austria
2nd	2006 Northern Ireland
8th	2007 Grand Prix of Khanty-Mansijsk
Europe's Strongest Man
10th	2002 Europe's Strongest Man
Britain's Strongest Man
2nd	Britain's Strongest Man 1997
3rd	Britain's Strongest Man 1998
1st	Britain's Strongest Man 1999
1st	Britain's Strongest Man 2000
1st	Britain's Strongest Man 2001
7th	Britain's Strongest Man 2002
3rd	Britain's Strongest Man 2003
UK's Strongest Man
1st	UK's Strongest Man 2004
1st	UK's Strongest Man 2006
1st	UK's Strongest Man 2007
1st	UK's Strongest Man 2008
2nd	UK's Strongest Man 2009
1st	UK's Strongest Man 2010
IFSA UK Championship
1st	IFSA UK Championship 1999
UK Strongman Docklands Challenge
3rd	1999 UK Strongman Docklands Challenge
Liberty Strongman Classic
3rd	2009 Liberty Strongman Classic
Northeast Strongman Showdown
13th	2001 Northeast Strongman Showdown
Gatineau Strongman Festival
8th	2001 Gatineau Strongman Festival
Ultimate Strongman Masters
1st	2011 Ultimate Strongman Masters World Championship
Northern Ireland/Ulster's Strongest Man
1st	Northern Ireland/Ulster's Strongest Man 1995
1st	Northern Ireland/Ulster's Strongest Man 1996
1st	Northern Ireland/Ulster's Strongest Man 1997
1st	Northern Ireland/Ulster's Strongest Man 1998
1st	Northern Ireland/Ulster's Strongest Man 1999
1st	Northern Ireland/Ulster's Strongest Man 2000

Glenn Ross (born 27 May 1971) known by his nickname "The Daddy", is a Northern Irish former international strongman and powerlifter who has represented Northern Ireland and the UK in several World's Strongest Man competitions and various World Grand Prix and European Team competitions. Ross is the founder of the UK Strength Council and Scotland Strength Association and the creator of the UK's Strongest Man competition, as well as several regional and national qualifying events.

== Strongman career ==
Ross is a 5-time winner of UK's Strongest Man in 2004, 2006, 2007, 2008 and 2010 and a 3-time winner of Britain's Strongest Man in 1999, 2000, 2001.

In 2003, Ross lifted three cars with the rear wheels completely off the ground, the combined weight including the frames of the three Citroën Saxos was almost 3 tonnes. However, in the hands of the lifter, this weight is actually more like 400 kg because the lifter is not lifting the raw weight of the car due to its lever system.

Ross also competed in the World's Strongest Man competition on five occasions.

=== Arnold Strongman Classic ===
In 2005, Ross was in his peak physical condition, and was invited to Columbus, Ohio to compete in the Arnold Strongman Classic, the heaviest strongman competition in the world. In the first event, he shocked audience members and judges by strict-pressing the 166 kg (366 lb) Apollon's Axle three times. He took first place in the 15-inch Hummer tyre deadlift, setting a world record of 443 kg (977 lb). In the Inch dumbbell press, Ross was tied for first alongside Hugo Girard and Brian Siders by strict-pressing the 78 kg (172 lb) dumbbell 10 times. Ross placed third behind Vasyl Virastyuk and champion Žydrūnas Savickas.

Ross competed in the 2006 Arnold Strongman Classic, but injuries to his patella tendons severely affected his performance. Ross lost his world record in the Hummer tyre deadlift to Brian Siders in 2006.

Ross's usual catchphrase during strongman competitions is "Who's the Daddy?".

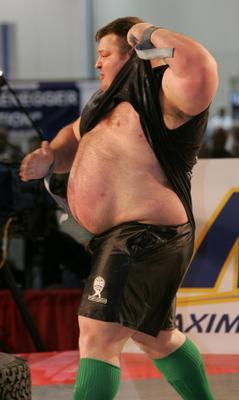
Ross performing in 2006

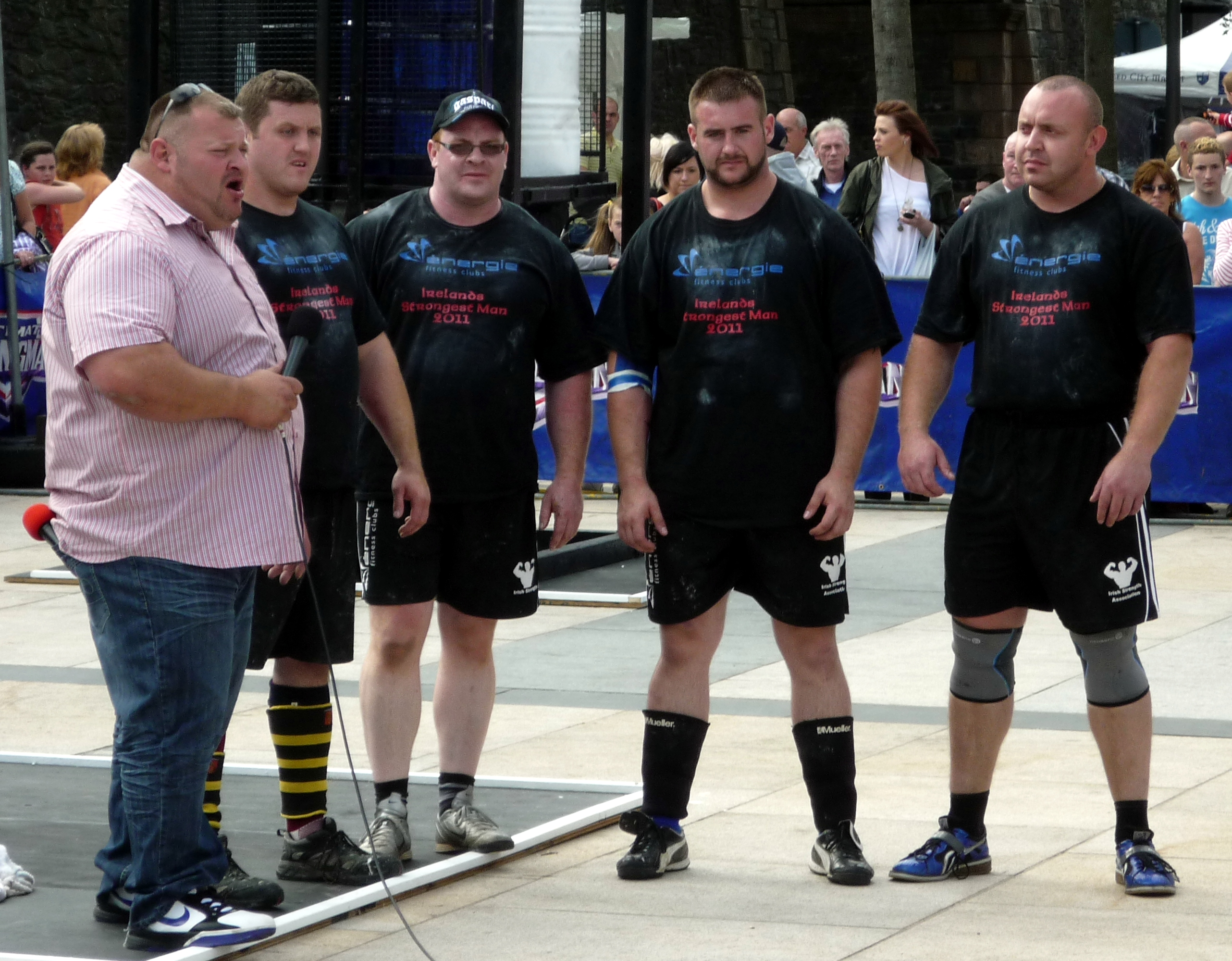
Ross commentating at Ireland Strongest Man 2011

== Personal records ==
=== Powerlifting ===
- Squat (Raw with wraps) – 400 kg (882 lb) (During training)
- Bench press (Raw) – 295 kg (650 lb) (During training)
- Deadlift (Raw) – 400 kg (882 lb) (During training)
- Total – 1,000 kg (2,205 lb) (380 + 240 + 380 kg (838 + 529 + 838 lb)) (2004 Irish Senior Powerlifting Championship)

=== Strongman ===
- Deadlift (raw with straps) – 400 kg (882 lb)
- Hummer Tire Deadlift (15 in) – 443 kg (977 lb) without a belt (former World Record)

→ Ross has also performed numerous other leverage deadlift variations (Note: In car-lifting events of the sort mentioned below, the full mass of the vehicle is not lifted. Instead, a system of levers is used to raise one set of wheels off the ground. The load at the competitor's hands is therefore of the order of 4000 newtons (i.e. would feel like lifting a 400 kg (881 lb) barbell). The exact load depends not only on the vehicle mass, but the distribution of that mass, which axle (front/rear) is lifted and also the geometry (i.e. lengths etc.) of the lever arrangements. This means that performances from one competition to another cannot be reliably compared.) such as deadlifting 3 Citroën Saxos from the rear below the knees at a combined weight of 2,750 kg (6,063 lb) and deadlift static holding a 1,200 kg (2,646 lb) Citroën Berlingo from the rear for 2 minutes and 56 seconds

- Standing Military press – 195 kg (430 lb)
- Steel Log press (300 mm diameter) – 175 kg (386 lb)
- Apollon's Axle press – 166 kg (366 lb) x 3 reps (continental cleans and strict presses with no leg drive)
- Viking press (Giant Log) – 115 kg (254 lb) x 19 reps
- Beer keg press (series) – 67–130 kg (148–287 lb) x 5 reps in 23.60 secs (2004 World Strongman Cup Kärtnen) (World Record)
- IFSA pool table bench press – 175 kg (386 lb) x 16 reps (2000 IFSA Ireland Grand Prix) (World Record)
- Inch dumbbell press – 78 kg (172 lb) x 10 reps (strict presses)
- Brick lift – 25 British bricks held between arms

== Size ==
Ross's strongman prime bodyweight of 200–215 kg (441–474 lb) makes him one of the heaviest strongmen in history. His neck measured 24 inches (61 cm), arms 24.5 inches (62 cm), chest 63 inches (160 cm), waist 50 inches (130 cm) and thighs 35 inches (89 cm). He downsized to 184 kg (406 lb) in 2009/10 but due to the lack of physical activity, his bodyweight ballooned to over 227 kg (500 lb). As of 2025, his bodyweight is around 190 kg (419 lb).

== Personal life ==
Ross has appeared on several TV shows, including Kelly Show, They Think It's All Over, The John Daley Show, Harry Hill's TV Burp, 8 Out of 10 Cats Does Countdown, Celebrity Big Brother's Big Mouth, Ask Rhod Gilbert and Hole in the Wall.

Ross works as a bouncer in County Down when he is not training. He is married with two children.

Preceded by Jamie Reeves	Britain's Strongest Man; 1999–2001	Succeeded by Marc Iliffe
Preceded by Steve Brooks (2001); Terry Hollands; Jimmy Marku	UK's Strongest Man; 2004; 2006-2008; 2010	Succeeded by Terry Hollands; Jimmy Marku; Incumbent
