= Richard Gosling =

British strength athlete

Personal information
- Born: Richard Gosling; 1974 (age 51–52)
- Occupation: Strongman
Medal record
Strongman
Representing Great Britain
World's Strongest Man
Qualified	2003 World's Strongest Man
Representing England
Britain's Strongest Man
1st	Britain's Strongest Man 2004
1st	Britain's Strongest Man 2003
UK's Strongest Man
2nd	UK's Strongest Man 2001
1st	UK's Strongest Man 2000
1st	UK's Strongest Man 1999
2nd	UK's Strongest Man 1998

Richard Gosling (born 1974) is the winner of Britain's Strongest Man contest in 2003. He currently lives in Cannock, England.

== Injury ==
Gosling was seriously injured in August 2001 when he was working as a doorman at a nightclub in Cannock. His attacker was given a life sentence for wounding with intent to cause grievous bodily harm.

Preceded by Marc Iliffe	Britain's Strongest Man; 2003-2004	Succeeded by Mick Gosling
