= Eddy Ellwood =

British world champion bodybuilder

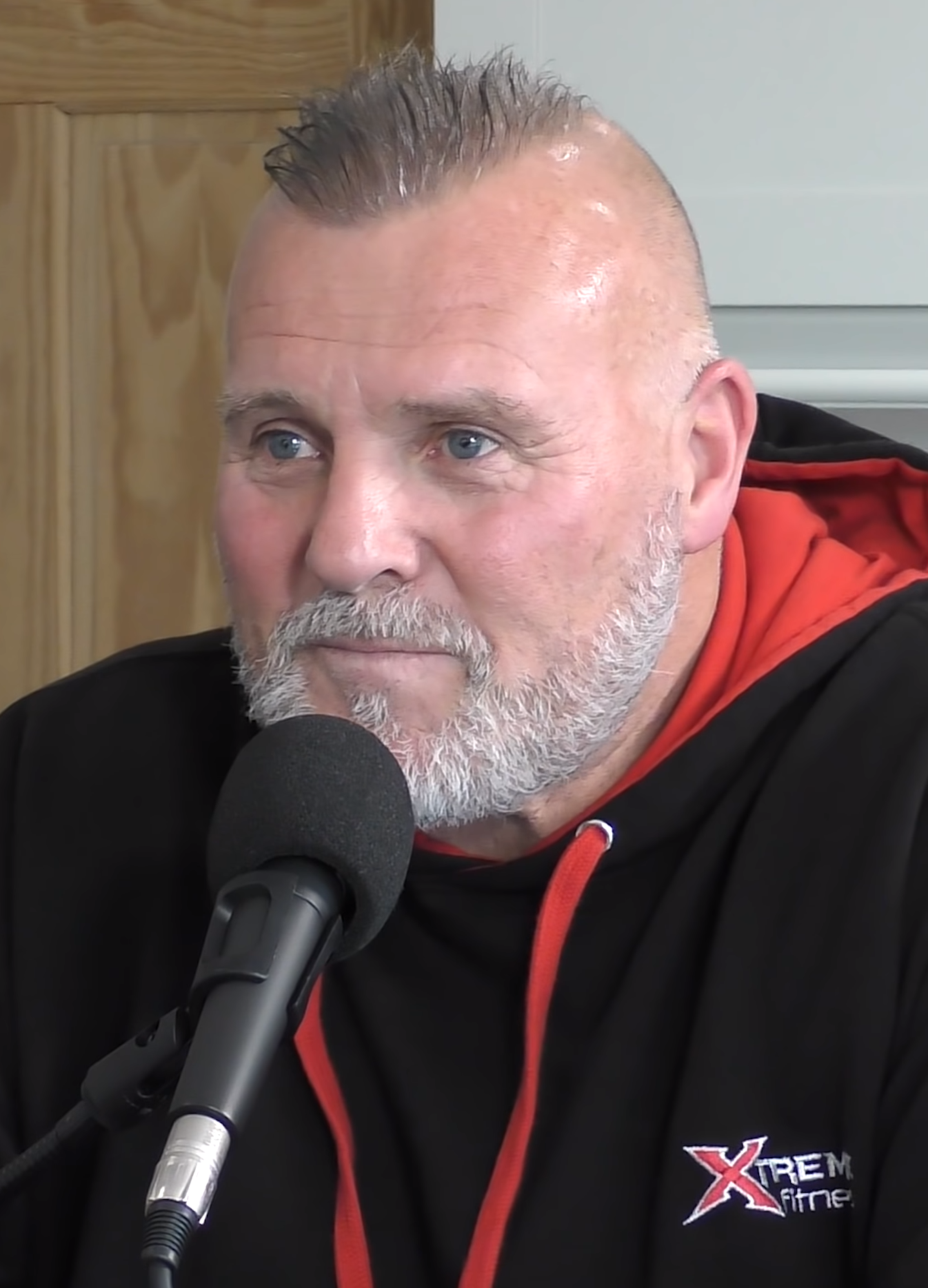
- Ellwood in 2021

Personal information
- Other names: Eddy
- Born: Edmund Ellwood; 30 March 1964 (age 62) Horden, England
- Occupations: Bodybuilder, Strongman
- Height: 6 ft 1 in (1.85 m)
- Children: Ethan, Jake & Max Ellwood
Medal record
Men's Bodybuilding
Representing United Kingdom
Mr Universe (pro)
1st	1997
1st	1998
1st	1999
1st	2000
1st	2001
Mr. Britain
1st	1989
Strongman
Representing United Kingdom
World's Strongest Man
Qualified	2003 World's Strongest Man
All Strength World Team Championships
2nd	2004 w/Team UK
IFSA World Team Championships
3rd	2005 w/Team World
3rd	2006 w/Team UK
European Hercules
9th	1995
Representing England
Britain's Strongest Man
Qualified	Britain's Strongest Man 2002
4th	Britain's Strongest Man 2003
4th	Britain's Strongest Man 2004
7th	Britain's Strongest Man 2008
England's Strongest Man
1st	England's Strongest Man 2003
1st	England's Strongest Man 2004
1st	England's Strongest Man 2005
England's Strongest Man (IFSA)
1st	England's Strongest Man (IFSA) 2005

Eddy Ellwood (born 30 March 1964) is a British world champion bodybuilder and professional Strongman competitor. Ellwood is best known for being a 5-time winner of the NABBA Mr Universe (pro) contest. He is also a 4-time winner of the England's Strongest Man title, including the IFSA version.

== Early years/Bodybuilding ==
As a teenager, Eddy Ellwood was a boxer but found a lack of local opposition in the light-heavyweight division. He stepped up a division to heavyweight and this required more hours in the weight room.

This resulted in the 19-year-old Ellwood entering a junior bodybuilding contest which he won.

Eddy went on to win Mr. Britain, and was a five time Professional Mr Universe.

== Strongman ==
In 2002, Eddy began competing in strongman, his first major contest was the 2002 Britain's Strongest Man contest. Eddy was winning his qualifying heat but suffered a severe biceps tear during the atlas stone event and was forced to withdraw from the competition.

Ellwood returned the next year and finished 4th at the 2003 Britain's Strongest Man, which earned him an invitation to the 2003 World's Strongest Man contest in Victoria Falls, Zambia. Eddy finished 4th again at the 2004 Britain's Strongest Man, and 7th in 2008.

Eddy also won the England's Strongest Man title three consecutive times from 2003 to 2005, as well as the IFSA version of England's Strongest Man in 2005.

== Lockdown fine ==
In 2022, Ellwood was ordered to pay over £55,000 in fines and costs when found guilty of four breaches of COVID-19 lockdown laws. He had allowed people to use his gym in 2021 when gatherings of that kind were illegal.
