= Dave Warner (strongman) =

British strongman

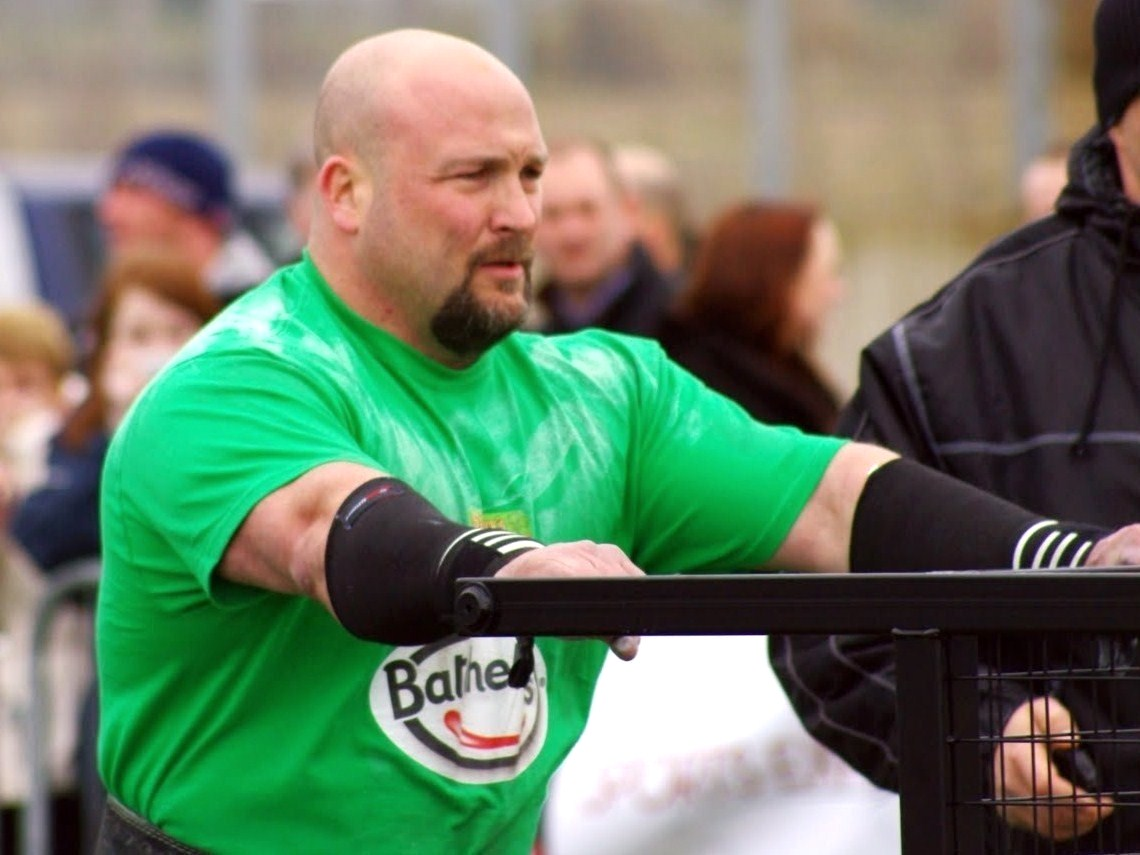
- Born: February 21, 1969 (age 56) (United Kingdom) Leeds, England
- Occupation(s): Strongman, Highland games, Armwrestling, Referee
- Height: 1.75 m (5 ft 9 in)

Competition record

Strongman

Representing United Kingdom

Britain's Strongest Man
4th	Britain's Strongest Man 2002	

UK's Strongest Man
2nd	UK's Strongest Man 2008	

Ireland's Strongest Man
1st	Irelands's Strongest Man 2006	
1st	Irelands's Strongest Man 2007	
1st	Irelands's Strongest Man 2008	
1st	Irelands's Strongest Man 2009	

Northern Ireland/Ulster's Strongest Man
2nd	Northern Ireland/Ulster's Strongest Man 2006	
1st	Northern Ireland/Ulster's Strongest Man 2007	
1st	Northern Ireland/Ulster's Strongest Man 2009	

David 'Dave' Warner is a retired strongman competitor from Ballymoney, Northern Ireland. He has also competed in Highland Games and Armwrestling.

Warner is a four-time winner of Ireland's Strongest Man, and a two-time winner of Northern Ireland/ Ulster's Strongest Man competitions. Upon retirement, he joined Giants Live, refereeing iconic lifts such as Hafþór Júlíus Björnsson's 510 kg (1,124 lb) deadlift as the side referee and Eddie Hall's 500 kg (1,102 lb) deadlift as the main referee. He is also a strongman innovator, having designed events such as the sandbag steeplechase.

Warner is a member of the Irish Strength Association Hall of Fame.
