= UK Strength Council =

British sport governing body

The United Kingdom Strength Council was founded by Glenn Ross, the famed strongman and also founder and promoter of the Irish Strength Association. The UKSC, as it is commonly termed, was promoted by Bob Daglish's Elite Strongman Promotions until March 2010.

== Beginnings ==
Part of the reason for the foundation was that Glenn Ross is a champion of the idea that strongman is about lifting and moving heavy objects. He has been quoted as saying that strongmen should be more akin to strongman of old, "fighting for every step, not running."

Ross's philosophy is represented in the contests the UKSC organise. There is little running with weights or like events, but rather lifting heavier weights as the main test and then struggling forward with them. Ross has said that, in relation to competing with other recognised events, such as Britain's Strongest Man, "when there is competition, it is good for everyone: competition in strongman creates an opportunity for the athletes, the fans and the sponsors to end up with a better product, and the reality is a free-market situation anyway."

"Big, strong men are like bears. As long as you keep feeding them honey, they will stay in their caves and stick with certain organizations, but when the honey pot runs out, they must go into the forest to look for more honey." - Glenn Ross

Bob Daglish's Elite strongman promotions was inextricably associated with the UKSC until it was announced in March 2010 that "In view of recent events and also some personal differences, Elite Strongman Promotions are hereby separating all affiliations with Big G promotions, the UK Strength Council and the UK strongest man competition." Elite Strongman promotions continued to run a version of the England’s strongest man final, whilst a separate competition run by UKSC was also run in 2010.

== Competitions ==
The UKSC is famed for its blue ribbon event, UK's Strongest Man. There are also a number of regional and national qualifiers.

They made history in 2024, becoming the first promoters to broadcast a live strongman event on British television when Channel 5 carried coverage of the UK's Strongest Man. Paul Smith successfully retained his title, winning three of the five events in the final.

=== UK's Strongest Man ===
Year	Champion	Runner-up	3rd place	Location	Promoter
2026	(England) Andrew Flynn (2)	(Republic of Ireland) Ruiari O'Hagan	(Republic of Ireland) Cillein Groom	(Scotland) Glasgow	Ultimate Strongman
2025	(England) Andrew Flynn	(Scotland) Chris Beetham	(England) Paul Smith	(England) Nottingham	Ultimate Strongman
2024	(England) Paul Smith (3)	(Scotland) Louis Jack	(England) Andrew Flynn	(Wales) Cardiff	Ultimate Strongman
2023	(England) Paul Smith (2)	(Wales) Matt Dimond	(Scotland) Callum Crozier	(England) Doncaster	Ultimate Strongman
2022	(England) Paul Smith	(Scotland) Louis Jack	(Wales) Gavin Bilton	(England) Milton Keynes	Ultimate Strongman
2021	(Wales) Gavin Bilton (2)	(England) Paul Smith	(Scotland) Andy Black	(England) Milton Keynes	Ultimate Strongman
2020	(Wales) Gavin Bilton	(England) Mark Felix	(Wales) Mark Jeanes	(Northern Ireland) Belfast	Ultimate Strongman
2019	(Scotland) Paul Benton	(England) Graham Hicks	(Republic of Ireland) Pa O'Dwyer	(England) St Albans	Ultimate Strongman
2018	(Republic of Ireland) Pa O'Dwyer	(England) Phil Roberts	(England) Laurence Shahlaei	(England) St Albans	Ultimate Strongman
2017	(England) Laurence Shahlaei	(Scotland) Tom Stoltman	(Republic of Ireland) Pa O'Dwyer	(Northern Ireland) Belfast	Ultimate Strongman
2016	(England) Eddie Hall (6)	(Northern Ireland) Jonathan Kelly	(England) Aaron Page	(Northern Ireland) Belfast	Ultimate Strongman
2015	(England) Eddie Hall (5)	(England) Chris Gearing	(Scotland) Tom Stoltman	(Northern Ireland) Belfast	Ultimate Strongman
2014	(England) Eddie Hall (4)	(England) Adam Bishop	(Scotland) Luke Stoltman	(Northern Ireland) Belfast	CNP
2013	(England) Eddie Hall (3)	(England) Ben Kelsey	(Northern Ireland) Jonathan Kelly	(Northern Ireland) Belfast	UKSC (UK Strength Council)
2012	(England) Eddie Hall (2)	(England) Lloyd Renals	(England) Chris Gearing	(Northern Ireland) Belfast	UKSC (UK Strength Council)
2011	(England) Eddie Hall	(Scotland) Ken Nowicki	(Wales) Richard Smith	(Northern Ireland) Belfast	UKSC (UK Strength Council)
2010	(Northern Ireland) Glenn Ross (5)	(England) Gary Gardener	(England) Rob Frampton	(Northern Ireland) Belfast	UKSC (UK Strength Council)
2009	(England) Jimmy Marku	(Northern Ireland) Glenn Ross	(England) Mark Westaby	(Northern Ireland) Belfast	UKSC
2008	(Northern Ireland) Glenn Ross (4)	(Northern Ireland) Dave Warner	(England) Jimmy Marku	(Northern Ireland) Belfast	UKSC
2007	(Northern Ireland) Glenn Ross (3)	(England) Jimmy Marku	(England) Simon Flint	(Northern Ireland) Belfast	UKSC
2006	(Northern Ireland) Glenn Ross (2)	(England) Terry Hollands	(England) Jimmy Marku	(Northern Ireland) Belfast	UKSC
2005	(England) Terry Hollands	(England) Mark Lawson	(England) Simon Morton	(Northern Ireland) Belfast	UKSC
2004	(Northern Ireland) Glenn Ross	(Northern Ireland) Brian Irwin	(Republic of Ireland) Carl Waitoa	(Northern Ireland) Carrickfergus	UKSC
2003	Not Held				
2002	Not Held				
2001	(England) Steve Brooks	(England) Richard Gosling	(England) Mick Gosling	TBC	Geoff Capes/Daily Star
2000	(England) Richard Gosling (2)	(England) Gary Meyern	(England) Adam Townsend	TBC	Geoff Capes/Daily Star
1999	(England) Richard Gosling	(England) Gary Meyern	(England) Adrian Smith	TBC	Geoff Capes/Daily Star
1998	(England) Adrian Smith (3)	(England) Richard Gosling	(England) Dave Miles	TBC	Geoff Capes/Daily Star
1997	(England) Adrian Smith (2)	(England) Graham Mullins	(England) Bill Pittuck	TBC	Geoff Capes/Daily Star
1996	(England) Graham Mullins	(England) Gary Meyern	(Northern Ireland) John O'Neil	TBC	Geoff Capes/Daily Star
1995	(England) Dave Miles	(England) David Waters & (England) Graham Mullins		TBC	Geoff Capes/Daily Star
1994	(England) Tommy Smith	(England) Bill Pittuck	(England) Lee Bowers	(England) Blackpool	Geoff Capes/Daily Star
1993	(England) Bill Pittuck	(England) Luke Green	TBC	TBC	
1992	(England) Adrian Smith	(England) Bill Pittuck	TBC	TBC	

==== Championships by country ====
Country	Titles
England	22
Northern Ireland	5
Wales	2
Ireland	1
Scotland	1

==== Repeat champions ====
Champion	Times
(England) Eddie Hall	6
(Northern Ireland) Glenn Ross	5
(England) Adrian Smith	3
(England) Paul Smith	3
(England) Richard Gosling	2
(Wales) Gavin Bilton	2

=== Regional and National qualifiers ===
- UKSC Midlands of England strongest man 2007
- UKSC North of England strongest man 2007
- UKSC South of England strongest man 2007
- UKSC England's strongest man 2007

== See also ==
- List of Strongman Competitions
