= Laurence Shahlaei =

British strength athlete

Laurence Cristiaan David Shahlaei
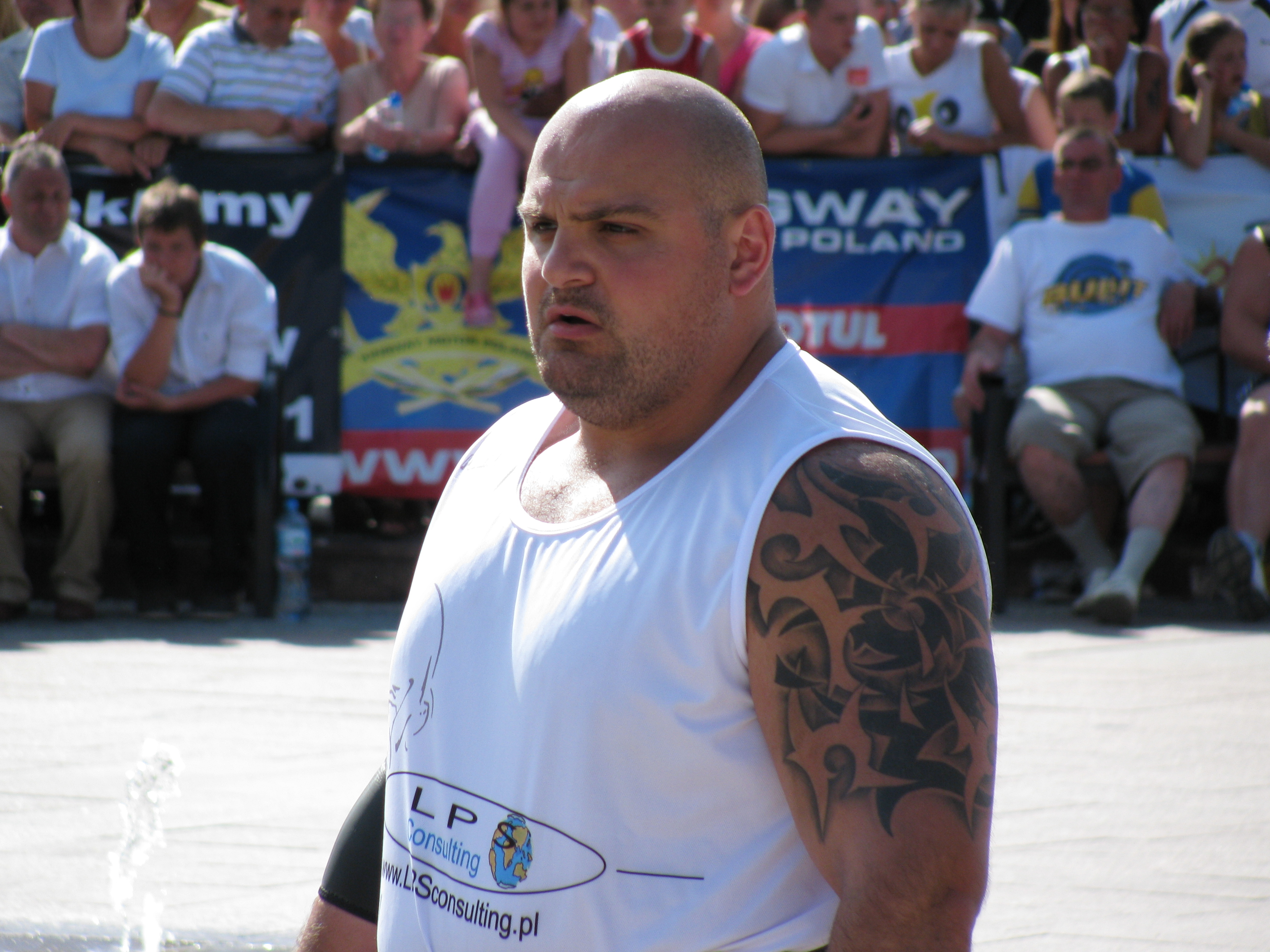
- Shahlaei in 2009

Personal information
- Born: 25 December 1982 (age 43) Cheltenham, Gloucestershire, England
- Height: 6 ft 2 in (1.88 m)
- Weight: 135–163 kg (298–359 lb)

YouTube information
- Channel: Big Loz Official
- Years active: 2016–present
- Genre: Strength Training/Strongman
- Subscribers: 167 thousand
- Views: 92.26 million
- Last updated: 1 March 2026

Sport
- Sport: Strongman
Medal record
Strongman
Representing United Kingdom
World's Strongest Man
Qualified	2008 World's Strongest Man
9th	2009 World's Strongest Man
Qualified	2010 World's Strongest Man
4th	2011 World's Strongest Man
Qualified	2013 World's Strongest Man
9th	2014 World's Strongest Man
Qualified	2015 World's Strongest Man
10th	2016 World's Strongest Man
7th	2017 World's Strongest Man
Qualified	2018 World's Strongest Man
Qualified	2019 World's Strongest Man
Arnold Strongman Classic
7th	2012 Arnold Strongman Classic
World's Ultimate Strongman
5th	2018 World's Ultimate Strongman
Europe's Strongest Man
3rd	2012 Europe's Strongest Man
5th	2013 Europe's Strongest Man
1st	2016 Europe's Strongest Man
8th	2017 Europe's Strongest Man
9th	2019 Europe's Strongest Man
Giants Live
2nd	2010 Ukraine
4th	2010 Istanbul
2nd	2011 London
1st	2012 Finland
1st	2018 North American Open
7th	2021 Strongman Classic
Strongman Champions League
1st	2011: South Africa
2nd	2011: Finland
1st	2011: Holland
3rd	2011: Canada SCL Semi-finals
3rd	2011 Overall
2nd	2012 SCL Iceman Challenge III
2nd	2012 Germany FIBO
4th	2012 Serbia
2nd	2012 Holland
2nd	2012 China
3rd	2013 SCL Iceman Challenge
WSF World Strongmen Championships
2nd	2012 WSC
Jón Páll Sigmarsson Classic
2nd	2011 JPSC
Strongman Super Series
10th	2008 Sweden Grand Prix
3rd	2010 Viking Power Challenge
3rd	2010 Sweden Grand Prix
3rd	2010 Overall
Representing England
Britain's Strongest Man
8th	Britain's Strongest Man 2007
4th	Britain's Strongest Man 2008
1st	Britain's Strongest Man 2012
1st	Britain's Strongest Man 2013
3rd	Britain's Strongest Man 2014
3rd	Britain's Strongest Man 2016
England's Strongest Man
1st	England's Strongest Man 2009

Laurence Shahlaei (Persian: لورنس شهلایی; born 25 December 1982) is an English YouTuber, strength coach and commentator. A former strongman competitor, he is most noted for winning the 2016 Europe's Strongest Man competition.

He is also the winner of England's Strongest Man (2009) and Britain's Strongest Man (2012, 2013) competitions at the national circuit.

== Early life ==
Shahlaei was born in Cheltenham, Gloucestershire to an Iranian father from Kermanshah and an English mother from Newcastle upon Tyne. He attended Balcarras School, and later moved to Stroud, Gloucestershire where he developed his passion towards Strength athletics.

== Strongman career ==
Shahlaei started strongman training in 2005 and entered his first novice competition that year, where he finished 8th. Within two years, he entered his first Britain's Strongest Man, having won the Midlands qualifier. In that competition in 2007, he made a huge impact, making it to the final only to tear his biceps in the tyre flip, which forced him to withdraw. He won the Midlands qualifier again in 2008, and once again made the final, this time finishing 4th behind Jimmy Marku, Terry Hollands and Mark Felix. This placing landed him an invite to the World's Strongest Man in 2008, however he did not make the finals.

In 2009, four years after beginning strongman, he became the UKSC Midlands Strongest Man and also won the UKSC England's Strongest Man. Shahlaei did not compete in the WSM qualifier titled England's Strongest Man, which replaced the Britain's Strongest Man contest in 2009 and was won by Terry Hollands.

In 2011 Strongman Champions League Holland, he was equal on points with Ervin Katona but emerged victorious on count-back. Shahlaei emerged runner-up to Krzysztof Radzikowski at 2012 WSF Championships in Abu Dhabi and second runner-up to Žydrūnas Savickas and Vytautas Lalas at the 2012 Europe's Strongest Man, but injured his shoulder during 2012 SCL China. He won 2013 Britain's Strongest Man however 3 weeks later, during 2013 World's Strongest Man group stages, he tore his quad during the squat event.

In 2014, Shahlaei emerged runner-up to Hafþór Júlíus Björnsson at the 2014 Battle of the North in Tórshavn, Faroe Islands. He suffered a severe injury attempting a personal best deadlift at the World Deadlift Championships in conjunction with the 2014 Europe's Strongest Man, tearing his lat, forcing him to withdraw from the competition despite sharing third place with Martin Wildauer with a 435 kg (959 lb) lift. In 2015 World's Strongest Man group stages, he again sustained an injury during the Norse Hammers event where the second of the three hammers tore his triceps and dropped him to the floor.

In his career spanning over 12 years, Shahlaei competed in 58 international competitions and won 8 of them including his best win, the 2016 Europe's Strongest Man. He also managed to win 4th place at the 2011 World's Strongest Man while securing 7th, 9th, 9th and 10th places in 2017, 2009, 2014 and 2016 respectively, making it five times into the finals. He also competed in the inaugural World's Ultimate Strongman in 2018 and placed 5th in a stacked field of 12. He also placed 7th in the 2012 Arnold Strongman Classic, widely considered the heaviest and most difficult strongman competition in the world.

During 2019 World's Strongest Man group stages, Shahlaei sustained a career ending injury when he tore his Achilles tendon while performing the super yoke. He made a brief comeback two years later to his final competition 2021 Giants Live Strongman Classic where he won 7th place.

== Other work ==
Shahlaei had a minor acting role in the film The Golden Compass (2007) and in 2011, competed on Deal or No Deal (UK game show), where he lifted presenter Noel Edmonds up above his head easily. In 2012, Shahlaei opened a personal training business in Swindon, Wiltshire.

Since 2016, Shahlaei has become a popular strongman analyst and commentator, announcing in many popular strongman franchises. He maintains a YouTube channel titled Big Loz Official, which has covered many strongman-related topics and has released more than 1,800 videos.

Shahlaei also runs a coaching business, with his clients competing in major strongman competitions. In 2023, he coached Mitchell Hooper to both the Arnold Strongman Classic and World's Strongest Man titles.

== Personal life ==
Shahlaei and his wife, Elizabeth Mason, live in Swindon, Wiltshire. They have 2 daughters Ava and Alexa. Shahlaei also has a step-son, Lewis from a previous relationship.

== Personal records ==
Powerlifting

- Squat – 380 kg (838 lb) (2020 Tattooed and Strong)
- Bench press – 227.5 kg (502 lb) (2020 Tattooed and Strong)
- Deadlift – 385 kg (849 lb) (2016 Tattooed and Strong)
- Total – 960 kg (2,116 lb) (365 + 220 + 375 kg (805 + 485 + 827 lb)) (2017 GPC-GB Salisbury Qualifier)

Strongman

- Deadlift – 435 kg (959 lb) (2014 Europe's Strongest Man)

→ Shahlaei previously held the joint strongman deadlift record with 430 kg (948 lb) in 2011 Giants Live London

- Giant Barbell Squat (for reps) – 317.5 kg (700 lb) × 12 reps (single-ply suit w/ wraps) (2017 World's Strongest Man)
- Keg drop Squat – 265–360 kg (584–794 lb) x 7 reps in 25.67 seconds (2008 World's Strongest Man - Group 4) (World Record)
- Log press – 185 kg (408 lb) (2011 SCL South Africa)
- Axle press – 205 kg (452 lb) (2010 Giants Live Turkey)
- Dumbbell press – 100 kg (220 lb) x 4 repetitions (2018 Giants Live North American Open)
- Dumbbell press – 90 kg (198 lb) x 8 repetitions (2017 UK's Strongest Man)
- Max Atlas stone – 200 kg (441 lb) x 3 times over a 4 ft bar (2013 SCL FIBO)
- Atlas stones – 5 stones 100–180 kg (220–397 lb) in 20.75 seconds (2016 Britain's Strongest Man)
- Atlas stones – 5 stones 140–200 kg (309–441 lb) in 30.80 seconds (2016 Europe's Strongest Man)
- Dinnie Stone carry in farmers walk style (with the original stones) – 332 kg (732 lb) for 22 ft 4 in (6.81 m) (World Record)
- Bavarian Stonelift – 275 kg (606 lb) for 81 cm (2012 SCL FIBO)
- Super yoke – 580 kg (1,279 lb) (15 meter course) in 16.49 seconds (2018 World's Ultimate Strongman) (World Record)
- Car Walk – 450 kg (992 lb) (20 meter course) in 11.05 seconds (2016 Europe's Strongest Man) (former world record)
- Keg toss – 7 kegs (18–25 kg (40–55 lb)) over 4.00 metres (13 ft 1 in) in 40.96 seconds (2011 World's Strongest Man - Group 2)
- Basque Circle – 363 kg (800 lb) 233° rotation (2018 World's Strongest Man - Group 1)
- Basque Circle – 300 kg (661 lb) 710° rotation (2014 Britain's Strongest Man)
- Thor's Hammer one arm grip lift – 113 kg (250 lb) (2021 Rogue Invitational)
- Captains of Crush – No. 3 gripper with 127 kg (280 lb) of pressure

== Competitive record ==
Winning percentage: 13.79%
Podium percentage: 41.37%

	1st	2nd	3rd	Podium	4th	5th	6th	7th	8th	9th	10th	11th	12th	13th	15th	17th	24th	26th	29th	Total
International competitions	8	10	6	24	5	4	4	5	2	2	3	1	1	1	1	1	1	1	1	58

== Filmography ==
=== Television ===
Year	Title	Role	Notes
2008-2011, 2013–2019	World's Strongest Man	Himself – Competitor	
2007	The Golden Compass		
2011	Deal or No Deal	Contestant	

Preceded by Hafþór Júlíus Björnsson	Europe's Strongest Man; 2016	Succeeded by Hafþór Júlíus Björnsson
Preceded by Jimmy Marku	Britain's Strongest Man; 2012–2013	Succeeded by Eddie Hall
Preceded by Jimmy Marku	England's Strongest Man (Elite/UKSC); 2009	Succeeded by Eddie Hall (Elite); Dean Slater (UKSC)
