= List of strongmen =

This list of strongmen is a list of people who are renowned for their feats of strength.

== Ancient Greeks ==
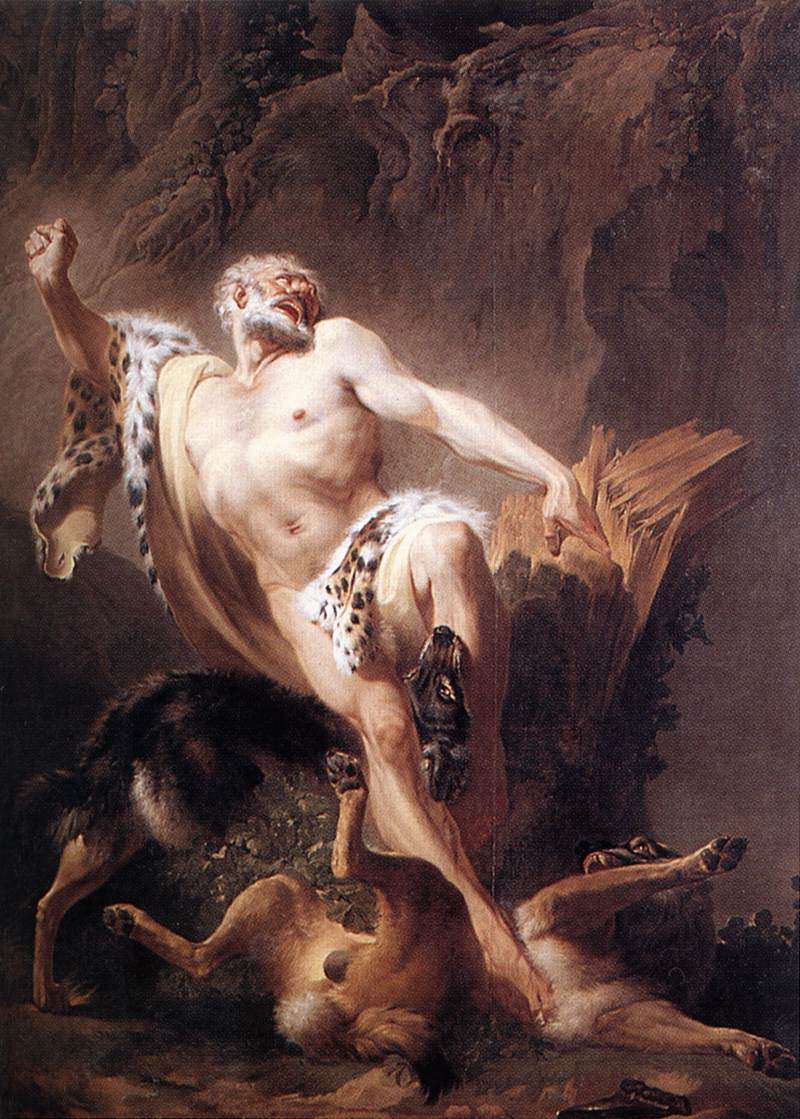
Milo of Croton

- Bybon, early 6th century BC weight lifter
- Milo of Croton, 6th century BC wrestler, reputed to have carried a bull on his shoulders by practicing daily since it was a calf. He saved Pythagoras by supporting the roof of a hall when a pillar collapsed.

== A ==
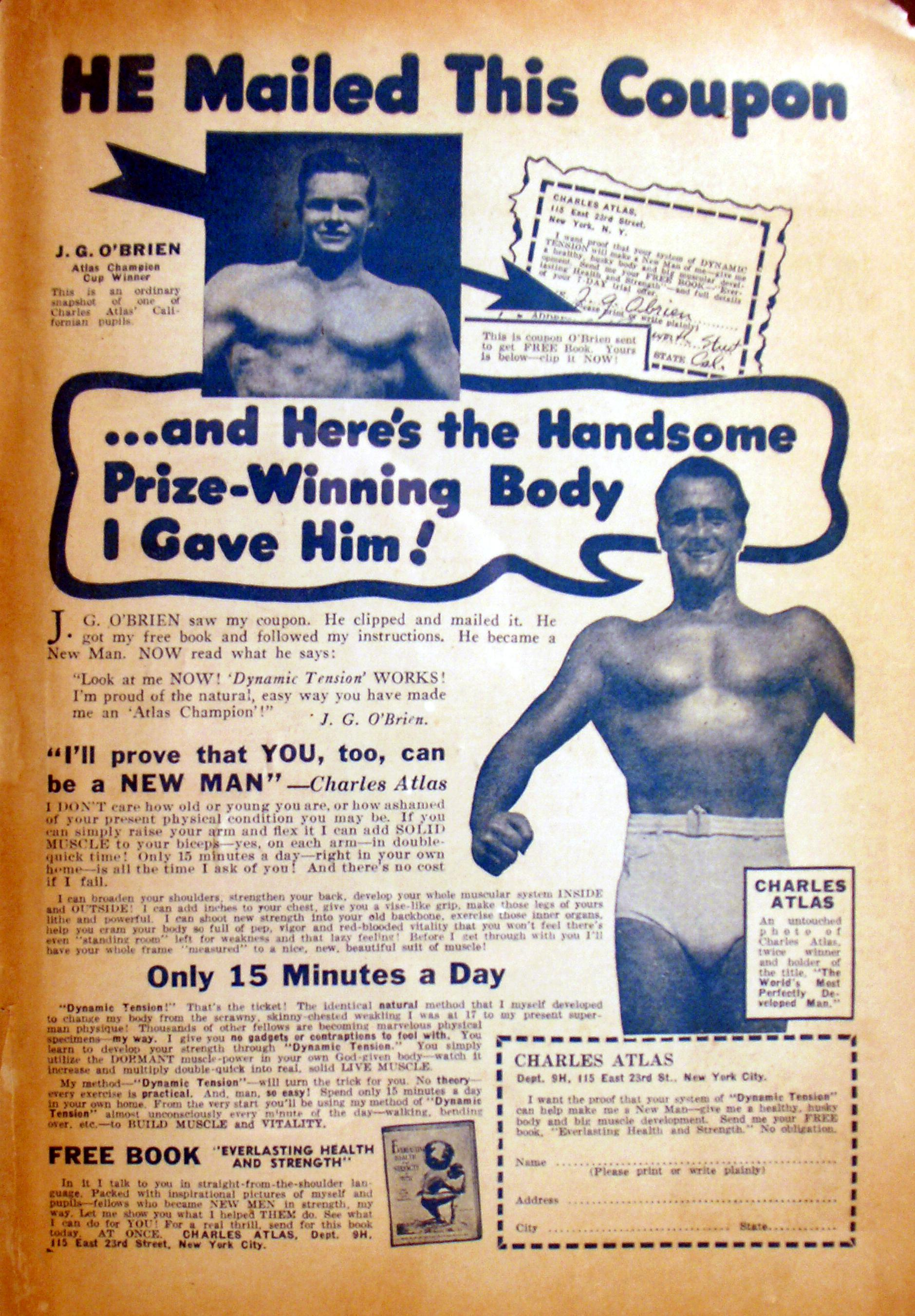
Adverts by Charles Atlas were common in American pulp magazines. This one appeared in Weird Tales in 1941.

- Aleksander Aberg
- Otto Acron
- Jouko Ahola
- Vladislav Alhazov
- Bill Anderson
- Paul Anderson
- Austin Andrade
- Johannes Arsjo
- Evans Aryee
- Don Athaldo
- Charles Atlas, known as the "world's most perfectly developed man", his feats included bending iron bars and pulling a train with his bare hands.

== B ==
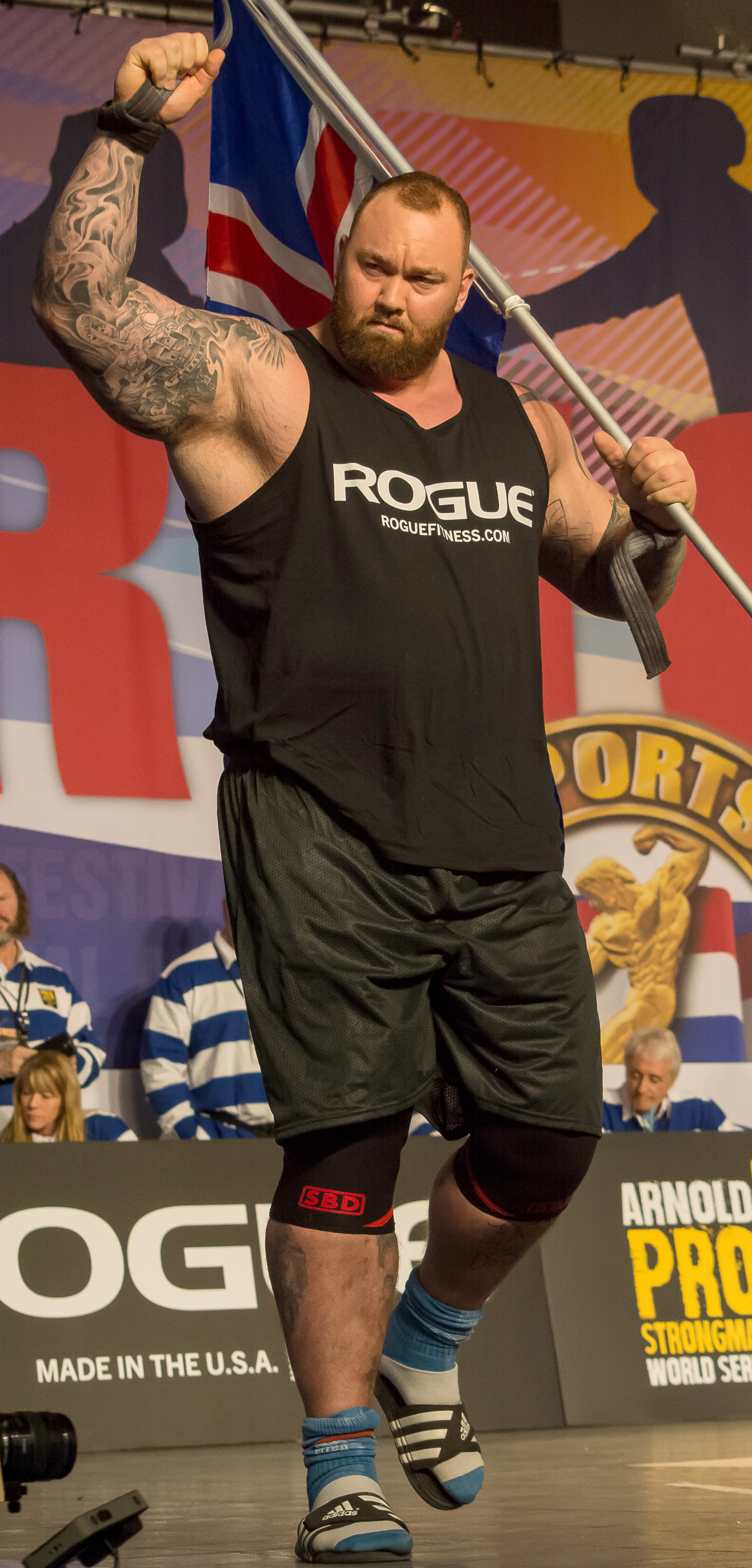
Hafþór Júlíus Björnsson at the Arnold Strongman Classic in 2017

- Patrik Baboumian
- Gerrit Badenhorst
- William Bankier
- Antonio Barichievich (1925–2003), also known as the Great Antonio, Croatian-Canadian strongman, professional wrestler and eccentric
- Matjaz Belsak
- Gerard Benderoth
- Raimonds Bergmanis
- Jason Bergmann
- Nick Best
- Gavin Bilton
- Adam Bishop
- Hafþór Júlíus Björnsson
- Jerry Blackwell
- Vidas Blekaitis
- Maxime Boudreault
- Andy Bolton
- Zishe Breitbart
- Mike Burke
- Samuel Burmister

== C ==
- Jean-François Caron
- Geoff Capes
- Cees de Vreugd
- Georges Christen
- Ed Coan
- Jon Cole
- Franco Columbu
- Forbes Cowan
- Louis Cyr
- Robert Cyrwus
- Simone Cascasi

== D ==
- Mills Darden
- Kelvin de Ruiter
- Wesley Derwinsky
- Valentin Dikul
- Donald Dinnie
- George Dinnie
- Gerard Du Prie
- Jarek Dymek

== E ==
- Gregor Edmunds
- Patrick Eibel
- Johan Els
- John Evans
- Thomas Evans
- Elgrando (Fahad)

== F ==
- Kevin Faires
- László Fekete
- Mark Felix
- Dominic Filiou
- Raul Flores (strongman)
- Shane Flowers
- Andrew Flynn
- Ondřej Fojtů
- Kane Francis

== G ==
- The Great Gama
- John B. Gagnon
- Reza Gheitasi
- Karl Gillingham
- Hugo Girard
- Hermann Görner
- Mick Gosling
- Richard Gosling
- Angus Graham
- Mike Greenstein
- Joe Greenstein
- Nick Guardione

== H ==
- Georg Hackenschmidt
- Eddie Hall
- Boab Hamilton
- Jarno Hams
- Lucas Hatton
- Arild Haugen
- Paddy Haynes
- Lars Hedlund
- Rauno Heinla
- Mark Henry
- Doug Hepburn
- Graham Hicks
- Tristain Hoath
- Manfred Hoeberl
- Mitchell Hooper
- Terry Hollands

== I ==
- Marc Iliffe
- Konstiantyn Ilin
- Thomas Inch

== J ==
- Konstantine Janashia
- Louis-Philippe Jean
- Mike Jenkins — Arnold Strongman champion in 2012.
- Bryce Johnson
- Nathan Jones (born 1967), Australian actor, powerlifting champion, strongman and professional wrestler
- Milan Jovanović (born 1970)

== K ==
- Svend Karlsen
- Ervin Katona
- Bill Kazmaier
- Rob Kearney
- Mateusz Kieliszkowski
- Riku Kiri
- Alexander Klyushev
- Dennis Kohlruss
- Mikhail Koklyaev
- Pavlo Kordiyaka

== L ==
- Vytautas Lalas
- Jimmy Laureys
- Signor Lawanda
- Lee Dong-gook
- Martins Licis
- Georg Lurich
- Louis Latulippe

== M ==
- Mohit kumar
- Magnús Ver Magnússon
- Benedikt Magnússon
- Ivan Makarov (strongman)
- Jimmy Marku
- Jesse Marunde
- John Matuszak
- Billy Meeske
- Trey Mitchell
- Tarmo Mitt
- Joseph Montferrand
- Andrus Murumets
- Tom Magee
- Martin Muhr

== N ==
- Kodi Rammurthy Naidu (1882–1942), Indian bodybuilder
- Pavlo Nakonechnyy
- Kevin Nee
- Rayno Nel
- Konstantin Nerchenko
- Chad Netherland
- Oleksii Novikov
- Ilkka Nummisto

== O ==
- Robert Oberst
- Brian Oldfield
- Heinz Ollesch
- Travis Ortmayer
- Sławomir Orzeł
- David Ostlund

== P ==
- Ted van der Parre
- Ken Patera
- Jessen Paulin
- Igor Pedan
- Johnny Perry
- Stefán Sölvi Pétursson
- Phil Pfister
- Ivan Poddubny
- Derek Poundstone
- Wayne Price
- Jerry Pritchett
- Mariusz Pudzianowski
- Ivan Putski
- Oleh Pylypiak

== R ==
- Stanley Radwan
- Krzysztof Radzikowski
- Mathew Ragg
- Flemming Rasmussen
- Jamie Reeves
- Don Reinhoudt
- Luke Richardson
- Joe Rollino
- Glenn Ross
- Lars Rørbakken

== S ==
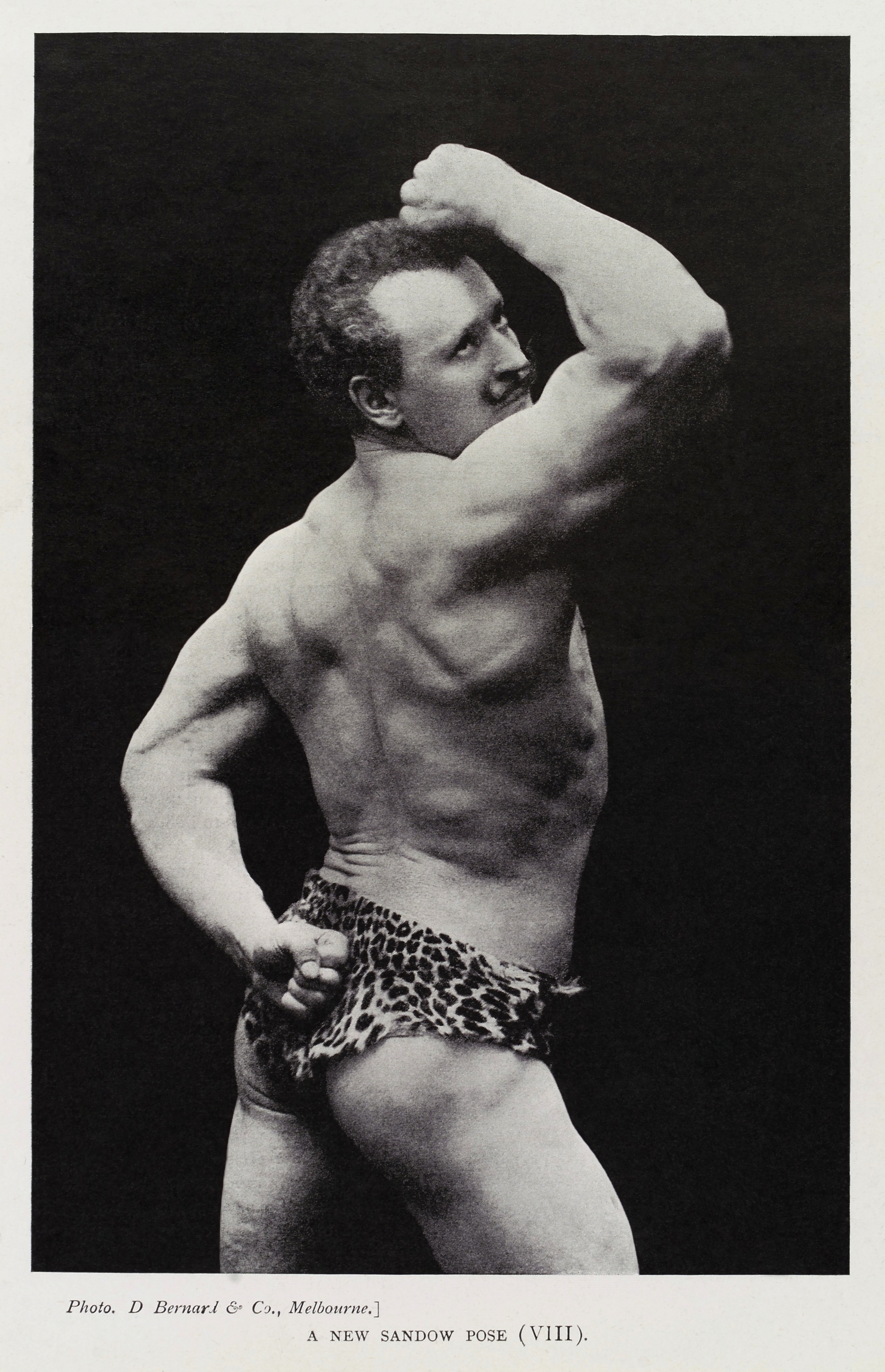
Eugen Sandow

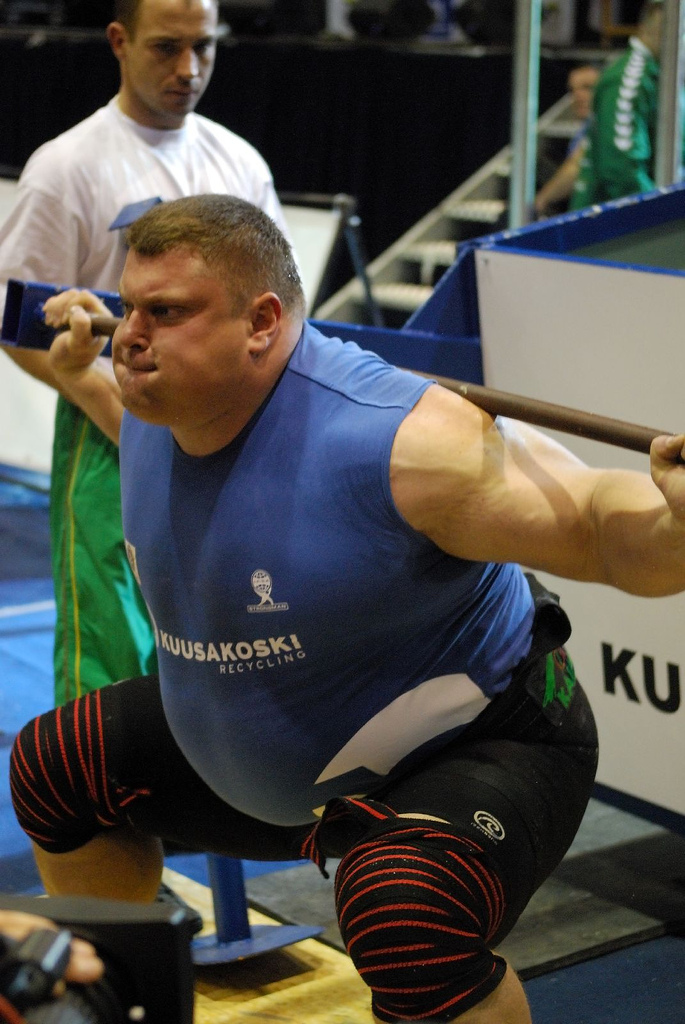
Zydrunas Savickas, the winner of many world championships, competing in 2007

- Žydrūnas Savickas
- Darren Sadler
- Frank Saldo
- Monte Saldo
- Magnus Samuelsson
- Eugen Sandow
- Arthur Saxon
- Jaco Schoonwinkel
- Laurence Shahlaei
- Brian Shaw
- Brad Shepherd
- Mikhail Shivlyakov
- Jón Páll Sigmarsson
- Manjit Singh
- Evan Singleton
- Richard Skog
- Aivars Šmaukstelis
- Jordan Steffens
- Luke Stoltman
- Tom Stoltman
- Braun Strowman

== T ==
- Gary Taylor
- Bobby Thompson
- Oli Thompson
- Stojan Todorchev
- Mika Törrö
- Warren Lincoln Travis
- Florian Trimpl

== U ==
- Louis Uni (1862–1928), French strongman also known as Apollon

== V ==
- Berend Veneberg
- Vasyl Virastyuk
- Janne Virtanen

== W ==
- Clarence Weber
- Sebastian Wenta
- Martin Wildauer
- Bruce Wilhelm
- Eddie Williams
- Adam James Wilson
- O.D. Wilson
- Ab Wolders
- Simon Wulfse

== Y ==
- Bob Young (1942–1995), American National Football League player who competed in the 1977 and 1979 World's Strongest Man competitions
- Doug Young

== Z ==
- Dainis Zageris
- Wout Zijlstra

== See also ==
- List of strongman competitions
- List of male professional bodybuilders
- List of female professional bodybuilders
- List of powerlifters
