= Strength athletics =

Sport

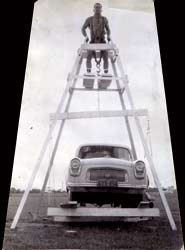
Strongman competitions usually involve non-traditional, often sensationalistic, challenges of strength.

Strength athletics is the collection of strength sports which measure physical strength, based on both: non-standard and historical implements as seen in Strongman and Highland games, and standardised and calibrated equipment as seen in Powerlifting and Olympic weightlifting.

Some of the disciplines have similarities to each other and although it is very difficult to master more than one, some athletes participate in several of them and perform at world class levels. Olympic weightlifting consists of two lifts (snatch and clean & jerk) and powerlifting consists of three lifts (squat, bench press and deadlift) where all test the maximal strength (one rep max output). Highland games consists of numerous different disciplines (including weight throws, carrying events and the caber toss) while Strongman spans multiple and changing events (including but not exclusive to; the log lift, vehicle pulls, lifting stones, yoke carries, keg-tossing, bar bending and loading races), testing both maximal strength and physical endurance.

At present day, Strongman takes the bulk of the strength athletics domain, owing to involving both standardised and non standardised tests of strength, as well as for its highly diversified nature.

== History ==
=== Origins ===
Strength competitions pre-date written history. The first Olympics (running, throwing, jumping) were believed to be held in 776 BC. There are records in many civilisations of feats of strength performed by great heroes, perhaps mythological, such as Heracles, Orm Storolfsson and Milo of Croton.

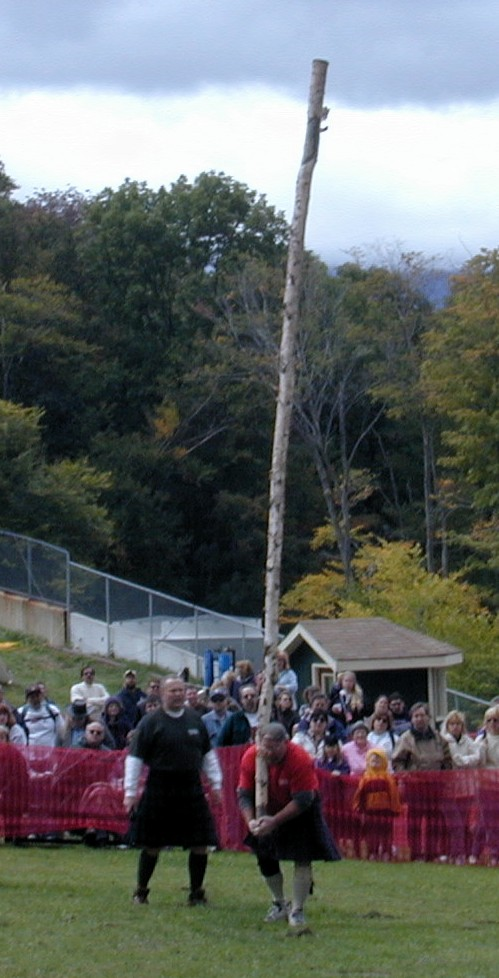
A caber being tossed by Steven Labrecque at the 2000 New Hampshire Highland Games

Competitions that modern strongman events are modelled on, Scottish Highland Gatherings, were formalised around 1820 by Sir Walter Scott. In 1848, Queen Victoria attended the Braemar Highland Games.

In the 18th and 19th centuries, circus strongmen lent sensationalism to their acts such as bending iron bars, breaking iron chains worn around their chests, and lifting heavy objects. Famous strongmen from this era included Thomas Topham, Eugen Sandow, Louis Cyr, Thomas Inch, Arthur Saxon, Angus MacAskill, and Alexander Zass.

In the 20th century, strength sports such as Olympic weightlifting and powerlifting were popularised through the Olympic Games. However, feats of strength akin to the circus performances also gained in popularity. David Prowse (who played Darth Vader in Star Wars) was initially famous in 1964 for his lifting the famed 733 pounds (332 kg) Dinnie Stones, the first man to do so since Donald Dinnie himself a century earlier.

=== Television ===
Perhaps the most famous event is the World's Strongest Man competition, still described by some as the premier event in strength athletics.

The concept behind 'The World's Strongest Men', as it was originally named, was developed in 1977 for CBS by Langstar Inc. David Webster, a Scot who later received an OBE for his services to sport, was the head coordinator of the competition from its inception. Dr Douglas Edmunds, seven-times Scottish shot and discus champion and twice world caber champion, worked with Webster. When Webster retired from his position, Edmunds took over. These two men were responsible for inviting the competitors and choosing the events. They selected men who had shown prowess in the mainstream fields of strength sports and field athletics events, such as shot put, American football, powerlifters, bodybuilders and wrestlers. The idea was to create a spectacle that would test competitors against one another.

The show was enough of a success that it began to be replicated in other countries, such as Britain's Strongest Man (1979). Competitors began shifting from unpaid amateurs to professional strongmen. By the end of the 20th century, and in to the 21st, other strongman programs and events were created such as Strongman Championship hosted by Errol Silverman. Other competitions have been televised, such as the World Muscle Power Championships, World Strongman Challenge, Arnold Strongman Classic, Giants Live, Highlander World Championships, World Strongman Federation, and Europe's Strongest Man.

== Common disciplines ==
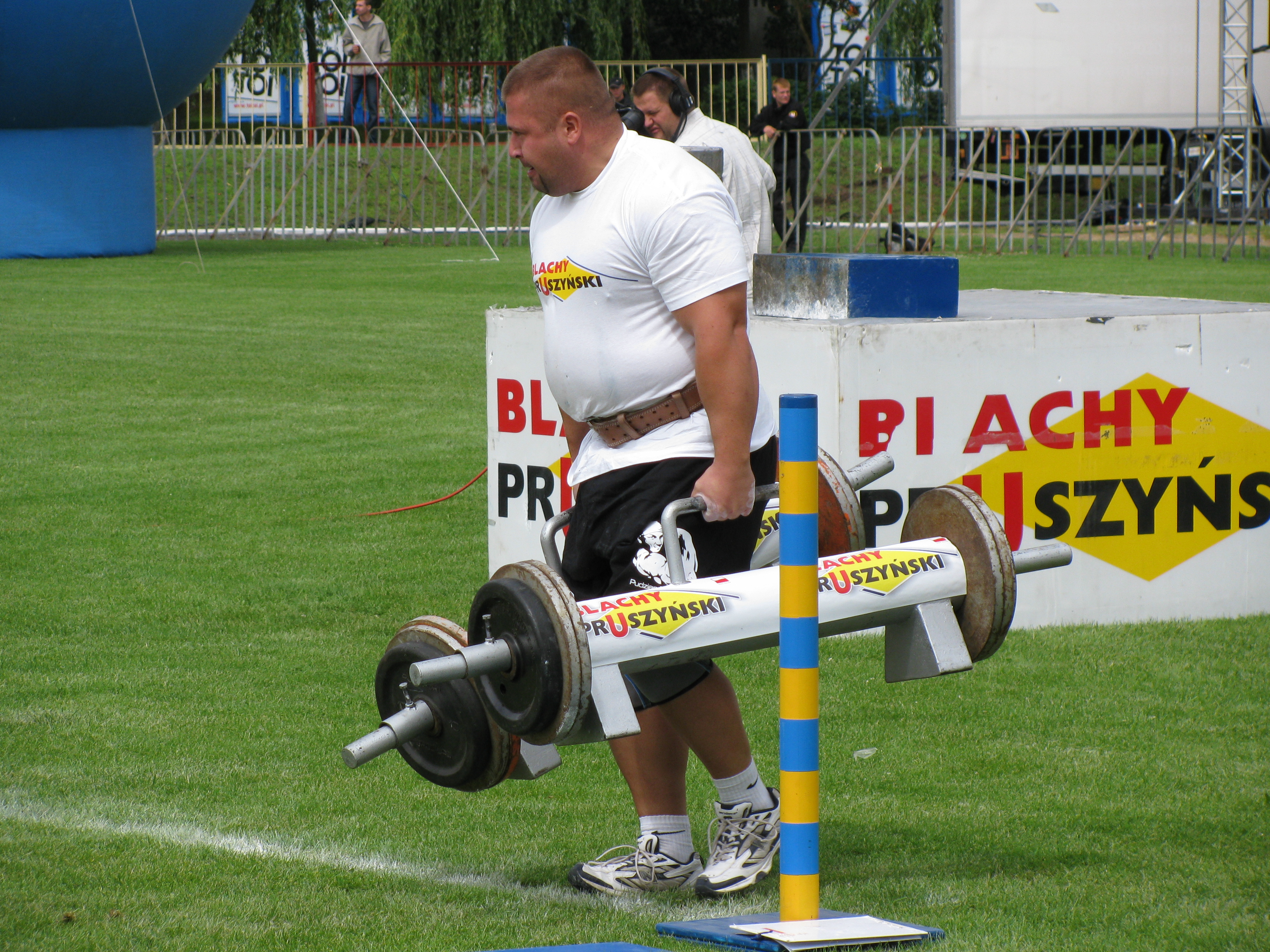
Farmer's Walk

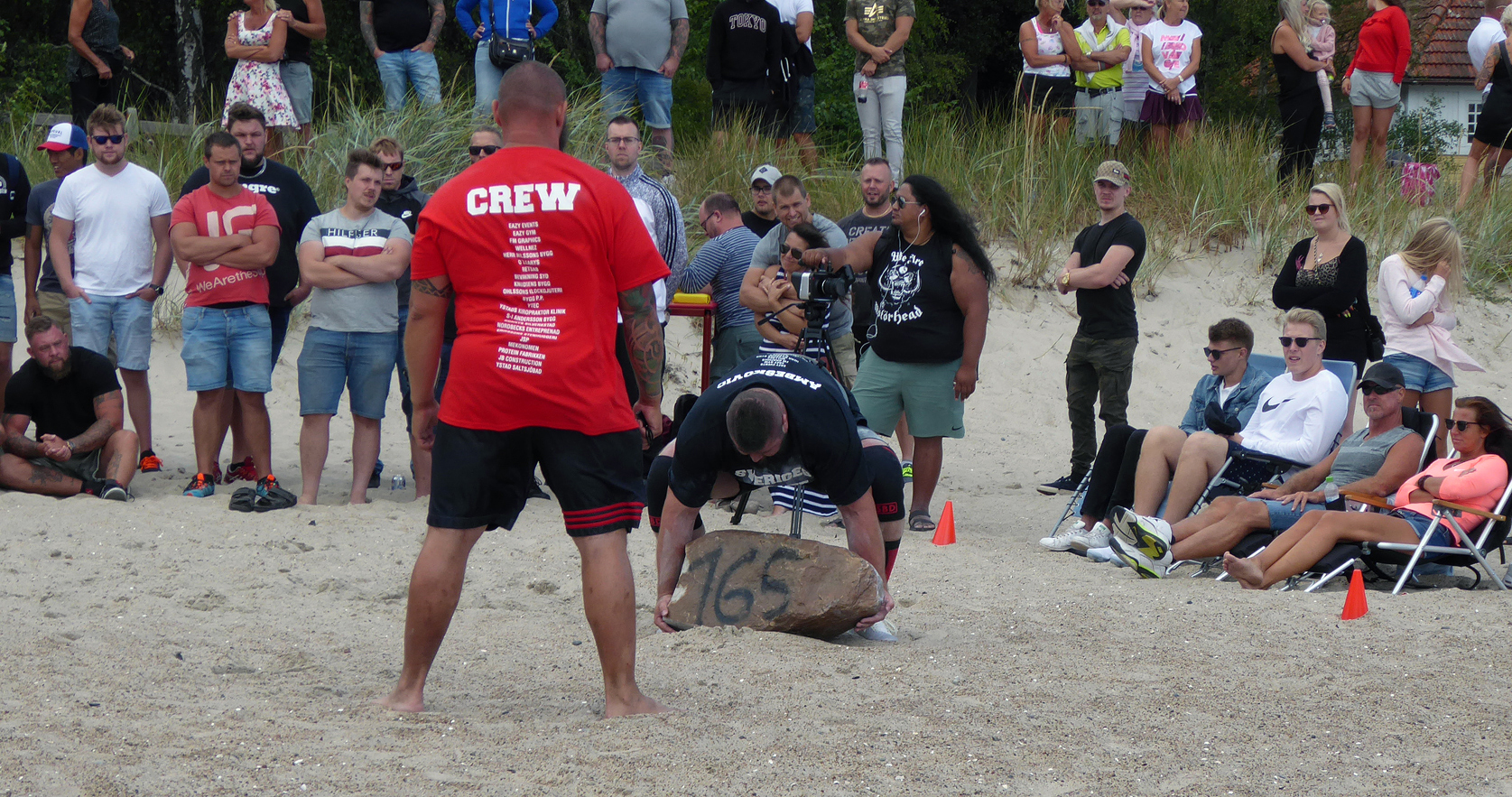
"Natural stone to shoulder". The stone weighs 165 kg

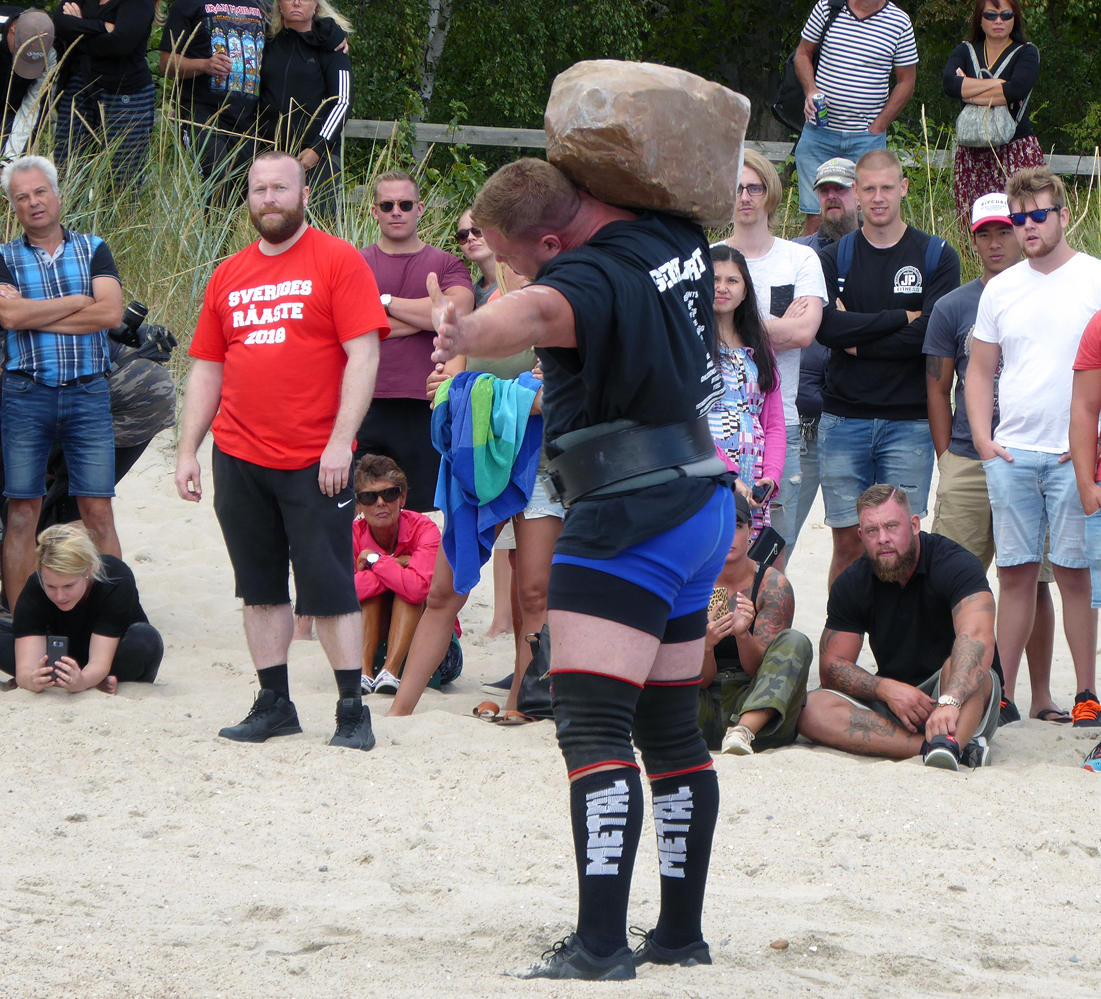
"Natural stone to shoulder". The stone weighs 165 kg

There is no set rule about what specific events will occur in a contest, except that to prevent single-event specialists from gaining an advantage, each event will be different (a single contest will not include two squat events, or two overhead lifting events, for example). Normally, a strongman contest comprises five or six events, though at the top level of competition, seven or eight events may be held. Among the most common events are:

- Farmer's Walk – competitors race along a course while carrying a heavy weight in each hand. A variation is the Giant Farmer's Walk, with a much heavier weight carried over a shorter distance.
- Hercules Hold or Pillars of Hercules – contestants stand between two pillars, pivoted to fall outwards. The competitor must simply hold them up for as long as possible.
- Vehicle pull – competitors pull a vehicle from a stationary start for a prescribed distance – fastest over the course wins. Trucks are commonly used, but larger spectacles employ trains, boats, and aeroplanes.
- Atlas Stones – a lifting stone event whereby five spherical concrete stones of increasing weight are placed on top of podia of varying height, beginning with the lightest stone lifted to approximately a normal person's head height. Alternatively, the stone is lifted over a bar for reps.
- Stone Carry – in Iceland, the original stone carry was performed with the Húsafell Stone, that was to be carried for a stretch to achieve the title fullsterkur (full-strong). This stone was not round but irregular, increasing the difficulty.
- Refrigerator Carry – a staple of earlier WSM events that has made a comeback in recent years. The competitors carry two refrigerators, attached to an iron bar they hold on their shoulders, and walk it across the finish line as fast as they can.
- Carry and Drag – an object (usually a heavy anchor) is run across half of the course. The competitors then must attach it to a chain of almost equal weight and pull it across the rest of the course.
- Fingal's Fingers – under a timer, lift and flip a series of progressively heavier, hinged poles from a horizontal starting position.

== Major titles and title holders ==
Year	World's Strongest Man	Arnold Strongman Classic	Shaw Classic	Rogue Invitational	Strongman Champions League	Europe's Strongest Man	World's Strongest Viking	World's Ultimate Strongman/ Fortissimus/ Defi Mark Ten	Strongman Super Series/ Pure Strength	World Strongman Cup Federation	IFSA World Championships	World Strongman Challenge	World Muscle Power Classic
2026	Mitchell Hooper	Mitchell Hooper		Trey Mitchell	(TBD)	Ondřej Fojtů	Adam Roszkowski						
2025	Rayno Nel	Mitchell Hooper	Evan Singleton	Mitchell Hooper	Rayno Nel	Luke Richardson	Adam Roszkowski						
2024	Tom Stoltman	Mitchell Hooper	Mitchell Hooper	Mitchell Hooper	Rayno Nel	Luke Stoltman							
2023	Mitchell Hooper	Mitchell Hooper	Brian Shaw	Mitchell Hooper	Oskar Ziółkowski	Pavlo Kordiyaka	Johan Espenkrona						
2022	Tom Stoltman	Martins Licis	Trey Mitchell	Oleksii Novikov	Aivars Šmaukstelis	Oleksii Novikov							
2021	Tom Stoltman		Trey Mitchell	Martins Licis	Kelvin de Ruiter	Luke Stoltman	Dainis Zageris	Oleksii Novikov					
2020	Oleksii Novikov	Hafþór Júlíus Björnsson	Brian Shaw			Luke Richardson	Sean O'Hagan	Oleksii Novikov					
2019	Martins Licis	Hafþór Júlíus Björnsson			Aivars Šmaukstelis	Hafþór Júlíus Björnsson	Krzysztof Radzikowski	Mateusz Kieliszkowski					
2018	Hafþór Júlíus Björnsson	Hafþór Júlíus Björnsson			Dainis Zageris	Hafþór Júlíus Björnsson	Krzysztof Radzikowski	Hafþór Júlíus Björnsson					
2017	Eddie Hall	Brian Shaw			Matjaz Belsak	Hafþór Júlíus Björnsson	JF Caron						
2016	Brian Shaw	Žydrūnas Savickas			Dainis Zageris	Laurence Shahlaei	JF Caron						
2015	Brian Shaw	Brian Shaw			Krzysztof Radzikowski	Hafþór Júlíus Björnsson	Hafþór Júlíus Björnsson						
2014	Žydrūnas Savickas	Žydrūnas Savickas			Martin Wildauer	Hafþór Júlíus Björnsson	Hafþór Júlíus Björnsson						
2013	Brian Shaw	Vytautas Lalas			Krzysztof Radzikowski	Žydrūnas Savickas							
2012	Žydrūnas Savickas	Mike Jenkins			Žydrūnas Savickas	Žydrūnas Savickas							
2011	Brian Shaw	Brian Shaw			Ervin Katona								
2010	Žydrūnas Savickas	Derek Poundstone			Terry Hollands	Žydrūnas Savickas			Brian Shaw				
2009	Žydrūnas Savickas	Derek Poundstone			Andrus Murumets	Mariusz Pudzianowski		Žydrūnas Savickas	Brian Shaw				
2008	Mariusz Pudzianowski	Žydrūnas Savickas			Žydrūnas Savickas	Mariusz Pudzianowski		Derek Poundstone	Derek Poundstone	Mariusz Pudzianowski			
2007	Mariusz Pudzianowski	Žydrūnas Savickas				Mariusz Pudzianowski			Mariusz Pudzianowski	Mariusz Pudzianowski	Vasyl Virastyuk		
2006	Phil Pfister	Žydrūnas Savickas							Mariusz Pudzianowski	Mariusz Pudzianowski	Žydrūnas Savickas	Žydrūnas Savickas	
2005	Mariusz Pudzianowski	Žydrūnas Savickas				Jarek Dymek			Mariusz Pudzianowski	Raivis Vidzis	Žydrūnas Savickas		
2004	Vasyl Virastyuk	Žydrūnas Savickas				Mariusz Pudzianowski			Žydrūnas Savickas	Raivis Vidzis			Hugo Girard
2003	Mariusz Pudzianowski	Žydrūnas Savickas				Mariusz Pudzianowski			Mariusz Pudzianowski			Mariusz Pudzianowski	Hugo Girard
2002	Mariusz Pudzianowski	Mark Henry				Mariusz Pudzianowski			Hugo Girard			Hugo Girard	Svend Karlsen
2001	Svend Karlsen					Svend Karlsen			Magnus Samuelsson			Magnus Samuelsson	Hugo Girard
2000	Janne Virtanen					Berend Veneberg						Janne Virtanen	Jamie Reeves
1999	Jouko Ahola					Jouko Ahola						Jouko Ahola	Hugo Girard
1998	Magnus Samuelsson					Jouko Ahola						Magnus Samuelsson	Jouko Ahola
1997	Jouko Ahola					Riku Kiri						Magnús Ver Magnússon	Raimonds Bergmanis
1996	Magnús Ver Magnússon					Riku Kiri						Nathan Jones	Forbes Cowen
1995	Magnús Ver Magnússon					Riku Kiri						Jouko Ahola	Magnús Ver Magnússon
1994	Magnús Ver Magnússon					Hoeberl & Magnússon						Andrés Guðmundsson	Manfred Hoeberl
1993	Gary Taylor					Manfred Hoeberl						Gerrit Badenhorst	Manfred Hoeberl
1992	Ted Van Der Parre					László Fekete		Mark Higgins				Jamie Reeves	Jamie Reeves
1991	Magnús Ver Magnússon					Taylor & Cowan		Mark Higgins				Riku Kiri	Jón Páll Sigmarsson
1990	Jón Páll Sigmarsson					Henning Thorsen		Mark Higgins	Kazmaier & Wilson			Mark Higgins	Jón Páll Sigmarsson
1989	Jamie Reeves					Jamie Reeves		Magnús Ver Magnússon	Árnason & Magnússon			Mark Higgins	Jón Páll Sigmarsson
1988	Jón Páll Sigmarsson					Jamie Reeves		Hjalti Árnason	Kazmaier & Thompson			Riku Kiri	Bill Kazmaier
1987						Ab Wolders		Bill Kazmaier	Jón Páll Sigmarsson			Geoff Capes	Geoff Capes
1986	Jón Páll Sigmarsson					Jón Páll Sigmarsson		Tom Magee					Jón Páll Sigmarsson
1985	Geoff Capes					Jón Páll Sigmarsson		Tom Magee					Jón Páll Sigmarsson
1984	Jón Páll Sigmarsson					Geoff Capes		Tom Magee					
1983	Geoff Capes					Simon Wulfse							
1982	Bill Kazmaier					Geoff Capes							
1981	Bill Kazmaier					Lars Hedlund							
1980	Bill Kazmaier					Geoff Capes							
1979	Don Reinhoudt												
1978	Bruce Wilhelm												
1977	Bruce Wilhelm												

== See also ==
- Strongwoman
- High striker
- Strength athletics in Iceland
- Strength athletics in the United States
- Strength athletics in the United Kingdom and Ireland
- Strongman
- World's Strongest Man
- World Strongman Federation
- Beauty and the Beast was billed as the World Strongman Challenge.
- List of strongmen
- International Federation of Strength Athletes ("IFSA")
- History of physical training and fitness
