= World's Strongest Team =

Tournament information
- Sport: Strongman
- Location: Various locations
- Established: 1995
- Format: Multi-event competition
- Teams: 6-8

World's Strongest Team is an annual strongman contest organized by Ultimate Strongman and Strongman Champions League that consists of two men teams (occasionally three) from various countries all over the world. It was inspired by the last three Pure Strength championships and the teams were named according to their ancestral traits and geographical locations.

The contest was first held in 1995 and during the first two years, it was held with three men per team. From 1997 onwards it was held with two men per team. During mid 2000s, it was assisted by IFSA and in 2021 was taken over and held by Strongman Champions League.

Some of the famous annual events include team deadlifts, team deadlift static holds, super yokes, rock lifts, Atlas stones, stone carries, four-man pole push, tug of war, medley, railway track farmers walk, Basque circle and arm over arm vehicle pull.

== Past winners ==
Year	Champion	Runner-up	3rd place	Venue
1995	(United Kingdom) Jamie Reeves (United Kingdom) Gary Taylor (United Kingdom) Forbes Cowan	(Netherlands) Berend Veneberg (Netherlands) Tjalling van den Bosch (Netherlands) Ted van der Parre	(South Africa) Gerrit Badenhorst (South Africa) Wayne Price (Namibia) Anton Boucher	Isle of Wight, England
1996	(Iceland) Magnus Ver Magnusson (Iceland) Torfi Ólafsson (Iceland) Gunnar Þór Guðjónsson	(Finland) Jouko Ahola (Finland) Riku Kiri (Finland) Jorma Ojanaho	(Austria) Manfred Hoeberl (Germany) Heinz Ollesch (Germany) Martin Muhr	Reykjavík, Iceland
1997	(Finland) Riku Kiri (Finland) Jouko Ahola	(Finland) Hannu Osala (Finland) Jukka Laine	(Iceland) Magnus Ver Magnusson (Iceland) Torfi Olafsson	Vaasa, Finland
1998	(Netherlands) Berend Veneberg (Netherlands) Wout Zijlstra	(Finland) Jouko Ahola (Finland) Sami Heinonen	(Sweden) Magnus Samuelsson (Sweden) Torbjorn Samuelsson	Hardenberg, Netherlands
1999	(Finland) Jouko Ahola (Finland) Janne Virtanen	(Sweden) Magnus Samuelsson (Sweden) Torbjorn Samuelsson	(Poland) Mariusz Pudzianowski (Poland) Jarek Dymek	Panyu, China
2000	(Finland) Janne Virtanen (Finland) Pasi Paavisto	(Poland) Mariusz Pudzianowski (Poland) Jarek Dymek	(Netherlands) Berend Veneberg (Netherlands) Wout Zijlstra	Cserkeszőlő, Hungary
2001	(Finland) Janne Virtanen (Finland) Juha-Matti Räsänen	(Poland) Jarek Dymek (Poland) Ireneusz Kuras	(Netherlands) Wout Zijlstra (Netherlands) Jarno Hams	Gdynia, Poland
2002	(Finland) Janne Virtanen (Finland) Juha-Matti Räsänen	(Netherlands) Berend Veneberg (Netherlands) Wout Zijlstra	(Poland) Mariusz Pudzianowski (Poland) Jarek Dymek	Heerenveen, Netherlands
2003	(Poland) Mariusz Pudzianowski (Poland) Jarek Dymek	(Hungary) László Fekete (Hungary) Tibor Mészáros	(United States) Mark Phillipi (United States) Jesse Marunde	Pécs, Hungary
2004	(Poland) Mariusz Pudzianowski (Poland) Jarek Dymek	(Lithuania) Zydrunas Savickas (Lithuania) Vilius Petrauskas	(Latvia) Raimonds Bergmanis (Latvia) Agris Kazelniks	Płock, Poland
2005	(Poland) Mariusz Pudzianowski (Poland) Slawomir Toczek	(Russia) Elbrus Nigmatulin (Russia) Mikhail Koklyaev	(Latvia) Raivis Vidzis (Latvia) Rolands Gulbis	Poznań, Poland
2006	(Netherlands) Edwin Hakvoort (Netherlands) Jarno Hams	(Hungary) László Fekete (Hungary) Miklós Fekete	(Finland) Juha-Matti Räsänen (Finland) Tomi Lotta	Sárvár, Hungary
2007	(Lithuania) Zydrunas Savickas (Lithuania) Vidas Blekaitis	(Russia) Mikhail Koklyaev (Russia) Igor Pedan	(United States) Derek Poundstone (United States) Tom McClure	Vilnius, Lithuania
2012	The Vikings (Iceland) Hafþór Júlíus Björnsson (Finland) Jarno Jokinen	Baltic Barbarians (Estonia) Tarmo Mitt (Estonia) Markus Männik	English Saxons (United Kingdom) Eddie Hall (United Kingdom) Simon Flint	Mullingar, Ireland
2014	The Yankees (United States) Brian Shaw (United States) Dave Ostlund	The Saxons (United Kingdom) Terry Hollands (United Kingdom) Eddie Hall	The Barbarians (Serbia) Ervin Katona (United Kingdom) Graham Hicks	Stoke-on-Trent, England
2015	The Vikings (Iceland) Hafþór Júlíus Björnsson (Slovenia) Matjaz Belsak	The Saxons (United Kingdom) Eddie Hall (United Kingdom) Mark Felix	The Yankees (United States) Jerry Pritchett (United States) Mike Burke	Stoke-on-Trent, England
2018	(Lithuania) Vytautas Lalas (Lithuania) Marius Lalas	(United States) Martins Licis (United States) Trey Mitchell	(England) Phil Roberts (Scotland) Tom Stoltman	Stoke-on-Trent, England
2019	(Canada) Jean-François Caron (Poland) Krzysztof Radzikowski	(Estonia) Rauno Heinla (United States) Rob Kearney	(Russia) Mikhail Shivlyakov (Slovenia) Matjaz Belsak	Nottingham, England
2021	(Latvia) Dainis Zageris (Latvia) Aivars Šmaukstelis	(Republic of Ireland) Johan Espenkrona (Republic of Ireland) Sean O'Hagan	(Netherlands) Kelvin de Ruiter (Netherlands) George Sulaiman	Joensuu, Finland
2022	(Latvia) Dainis Zageris (Latvia) Aivars Šmaukstelis	(Estonia) Ervin Toots (Estonia) Gunnar Gimbutas	(Netherlands) Kelvin de Ruiter (Netherlands) George Sulaiman	Joensuu, Finland
2023	(Poland) Oskar Ziolkowski (Poland) Adam Roszkowski	(Latvia) Aivars Šmaukstelis (Latvia) Maris Krievelis	(Estonia) Ervin Toots (Estonia) Gunnar Gimbutas	Kalajoki, Finland

- Results courtesy of www.strengthresults.com and David Horne's World of Grip

== See also ==
- Pure Strength
