= Veneberg =

Veneberg is a surname. Notable people with the surname include:

- Berend Veneberg (born 1963), Dutch strongman and powerlifter
- Thorwald Veneberg (born 1977), Dutch cyclist
