= Tjalling van den Bosch =

Dutch strongman

Tjalling "Charlie" van den Bosch
Personal information
- Born: 28 June 1958 (age 68) Netherlands
- Occupation: Strongman Powerlifter Highland Games
- Height: 6 ft 3 in (1.91 m)
Medal record
Strongman
Representing Netherlands
World's Strongest Man
7th	1990
Strongest man of the Netherlands
1st	1989
Pure Strength
3rd	1988 w/Ab Wolders
4th	1989 w/Ab Wolders
3rd	1990 w/Ted van der Parre
World's Strongest Team
3rd	1988 w/Ab Wolders
3rd	1990 w/Ted van der Parre
2nd	1995 w/Berend Veneberg & Ted van der Parre

Tjalling van den Bosch (born 28 June 1958 in Achlum) or "Charlie" as he was often called, is a former Dutch powerlifter, strongman, and Highland Games athlete. He competed once in World's Strongest Man competition in 1990 finishing 7th, however he was scheduled to compete in 1989 but had to withdraw due to an injury. Tjalling won the Strongest man of the Netherlands contest in 1989, defeating Ab Wolders and Ted van der Parre who were joint-second.

Tjalling studied psychology in Finland and has been training professional soccer players, speed skaters, track and field athletes and cyclists. His mental approach is also popular with companies, which have invited him to give inspirational talks. Tjalling is also a popular TV and movie personality in the Netherlands. He has appeared as a host on a game show for 3 1/2 years. His most famous movie being Bullseye! with Roger Moore and Michael Caine.

Tjalling founded the strongman competition Pure Strength, which held events between 1987-1990. He also loves to play a game that demands the most from his mind Draughts where he was once ranked in the top 100 in the world.

== Personal records ==
- Caber over bar – 35 kg (77 lb) over 6.00 metres (19 ft 8 in) (1990 World Muscle Power Classic) (Joint-World Record)
- Car pull – 18 cars for 20 metres (1998 Guinness Book of World Records) (World Record)

In addition to above Tjalling has also won World-Truck-Pull Championship twice (Petersborough 1989 & Birmingham 1991), Dutch Strongest Man and was also the Dutch Highland Games Champion.
