= Poland's Strongest Man =

Sports Competition

Tournament information
- Location: Poland
- Established: 1999
- Format: Multi-event competition

Current champion
- (Poland) Robert Cyrwus

Poland's Strongest Man (Polish: Najsilniejszy człowiek Polski) is an annual strongman competition held in Poland and featuring exclusively Polish athletes. The contest was established in 1999. It is a multi event competition that tests competitors in a number of different events and the cumulative total of all the events determine who the winner is.

Over the past 27 years, 11 athletes have won the title while Mariusz Pudzianowski holds the record for most wins with 7 titles.

== Champions breakdown ==
Year	Champion	Runner-up	3rd place
1999	(Poland) Lubomir Libacki	(Poland) Piotr Jarmolik	(Poland) Robert Grygorcewicz
2000	(Poland) Mariusz Pudzianowski	(Poland) Jarek Dymek	(Poland) Jacek Dymek
2001	(Poland) Jarek Dymek	(To be confirmed)	(To be confirmed)
2002	(Poland) Jarek Dymek	(Poland) Mariusz Pudzianowski	(Poland) Ireneusz Kuraś
2003	(Poland) Mariusz Pudzianowski	(Poland) Robert Szczepański	(Poland) Jarek Dymek
2004	(Poland) Mariusz Pudzianowski	(Poland) Sławomir Toczek	(Poland) Tomasz Nowotniak
2005	(Poland) Jarek Dymek	(Poland) Sławomir Toczek	(Poland) Tomasz Żocholl
2006	(Poland) Mariusz Pudzianowski	(Poland) Sławomir Toczek	(Poland) Sebastian Wenta
2007	(Poland) Mariusz Pudzianowski	(Poland) Jarek Dymek	(Poland) Grzegorz Szymański
2008	(Poland) Mariusz Pudzianowski	(Poland) Sławomir Toczek	(Poland) Krzysztof Radzikowski
2009	(Poland) Mariusz Pudzianowski	(Poland) Grzegorz Szymański	(Poland) Krzysztof Radzikowski
2010	(Poland) Rafał Kobylarz	(Poland) Mateusz Baron	(Poland) Tomasz Kowal
2011	(Poland) Janusz Kułaga	(Poland) Sławomir Toczek	(Poland) Sebastian Kurek
2012	(Poland) Krzysztof Radzikowski	(Poland) Janusz Kułaga	(Poland) Sebastian Kurek
2013	(Poland) Krzysztof Radzikowski	(Poland) Robert Cyrwus	(Poland) Bartłomiej Bąk
2014	(Poland) Grzegorz Szymański	(Poland) Rafał Kobylarz	(Poland) Robert Cyrwus
2015	(Poland) Mateusz Kieliszkowski	(Poland) Robert Cyrwus	(Poland) Krzysztof Radzikowski
2016	(Poland) Mateusz Kieliszkowski	(Poland) Rafał Kobylarz	(Poland) Mateusz Baron
2017	(Poland) Mateusz Kieliszkowski	(Poland) Robert Cyrwus	(Poland) Rafał Kobylarz
2018	(Poland) Mateusz Kieliszkowski	(Poland) Rafał Kobylarz	(Poland) Mateusz Ostaszewski
2019	(Poland) Mateusz Kieliszkowski	(Poland) Robert Cyrwus	(Poland) Rafał Kobylarz
2020	(Poland) Robert Cyrwus	(Poland) Marcin Wlizło	(Poland) Oskar Ziółkowski
2021	(Poland) Oskar Ziółkowski	(Poland) Dawid Pakulski	(Poland) Jakub Szczechowski
2022	(Poland) Marek Czajkowski	(Poland) Oskar Ziółkowski	(Poland) Adam Roszkowski
2023	(Poland) Marek Czajkowski	(Poland) Dariusz Błaszczyk	(Poland) Robert Sanewski
2024	(Poland) Oskar Ziółkowski	(Poland) Marek Czajkowski	(Poland) Paweł Piskorz
2025	(Poland) Robert Cyrwus	(Poland) Łukasz Kieliszkowski	(Poland) Paweł Piskorz

=== List of champions ===
Champion	Times & years
(Poland) Mariusz Pudzianowski	7 (2000, 2003, 2004, 2006, 2007, 2008, 2009)
(Poland) Mateusz Kieliszkowski	5 (2015, 2016, 2017, 2018, 2019)
(Poland) Jarek Dymek	3 (2001, 2002, 2005)
(Poland) Krzysztof Radzikowski	2 (2012, 2013)
(Poland) Robert Cyrwus	2 (2020, 2025)
(Poland) Oskar Ziółkowski	2 (2021, 2024)
(Poland) Marek Czajkowski	2 (2022, 2023)
(Poland) Lubomir Libacki	1 (1999)
(Poland) Rafał Kobylarz	1 (2010)
(Poland) Janusz Kułaga	1 (2011)
(Poland) Grzegorz Szymański	1 (2014)

==== Most podium finishes without winning the title ====
Athlete	Times (breakdown)
(Poland) Sławomir Toczek	5 (5 x 2nd)
(Poland) Mateusz Baron	2 (1 x 2nd, 1 x 3rd)
(Poland) Sebastian Kurek	2 (2 x 3rd)
(Poland) Paweł Piskorz	2 (2 x 3rd)
