= Wout Zijlstra =

Dutch strength athlete

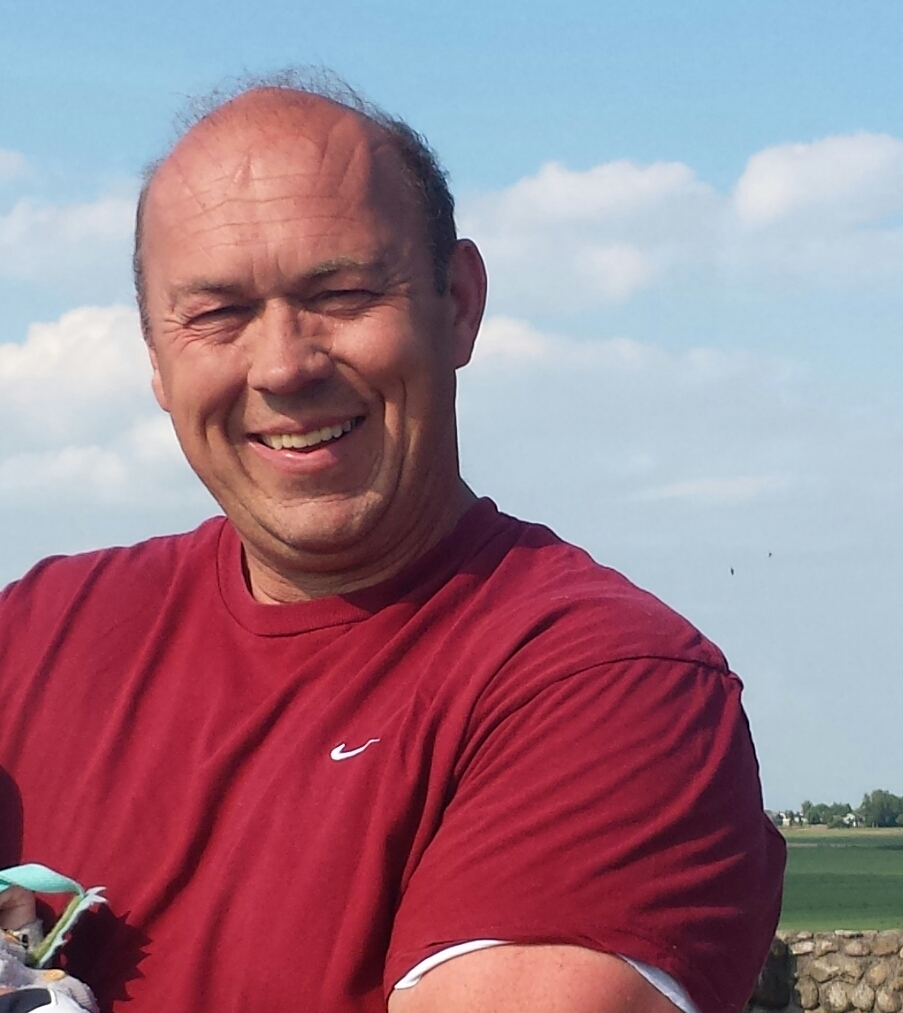

Personal information
- Born: 4 August 1964 (age 62) Wolsum, Friesland, The Netherlands
- Occupation: Strongman Highland Games
- Height: 1.97 m (6 ft 5 1/2 in)
Medal record
Strongman
Representing Netherlands
World's Strongest Man
| 3rd | 1998 |
| 8th | 2001 |
Strongest man of the Netherlands
| 2nd | 1991 |
| 3rd | 1994 |
| 2nd | 1996 |
| 2nd | 1997 |
| 1st | 2001 |
World's Strongest Team
| 1st | 1998 w/Berend Veneberg |
| 4th | 1999 w/Berend Veneberg |
| 3rd | 2001 w/Jarno Hams |
| 3rd | 2000 w/Berend Veneberg |
| 2nd | 2002 w/Berend Veneberg |
Highland Games
Representing Netherlands
NK Highland Games
| 1st | 2003 |
| 1st | 2004 |

Wout Zijlstra (born 4 August 1964, in Wolsum) is a former strongman and Highland Games athlete from the Netherlands. He competed in the World's Strongest Man competition on two occasions, winning the 3rd place in 1998 behind Sweden's Magnus Samuelsson and Finland's Jouko Ahola.

== Biography ==
Zijlstra was born in Wolsum, Friesland. He managed his first podium finish at the Strongest man of the Netherlands in 1991 where he finished second after Ted van der Parre. It took him until 1994 to reach the podium again. This time he finished third after Ted van der Parre and Berend Veneberg. After this he finished several more times on the podium but it would take him until 2001 to finally win the tournament. After this victory he would not compete again and started focusing on Highland Games. He was invited twice to compete in the World's Strongest Man on both occasions he reached the final. In 1998 he competed together with his rival from the Netherlands Berend Veneberg and would finish third in the final. In 2001 he finished eight in the World's Strongest Man competition. Zijlstra competed together with Berend Veneberg on several occasions in the World's Strongest Team competition and won the tournament in 1998. After this they reached the podium several more times but did not win again.

During 1998 World's Strongest Team, Zijlstra equaled Manfred Hoeberl's Highland games one arm weight over bar world record for the 25.5 kg (56 lb) with a 5.60 metres (18 ft 4 in) throw. In 1999, Iceland's Sæmundur Sæmundsson broke Hoeberl and Zijlstra's joint record with 5.62 metres (18 ft 5 in), but during 2000 World Grand Prix world series Zijlstra reclaimed the record outright with 5.65 metres (18 ft 6 in) and took it to 5.70 metres (18 ft 8 in) during 2002 Den Helder Highland Games. He also finished the Elfstedentocht twice and won NK Highland Games in 2003 and 2004.

Zijlstra works as a meat inspector and does security jobs. He is married and has 3 children.

== Personal records ==
- Deadlift – 340 kg (750 lb) (2001 WSM Group 1)
- Log press – 150 kg (331 lb) (2001 Strongman World Record Breakers)
- Farmer's walk (no straps) – 175 kg (386 lb) per each hand for 28.27 metres (92 ft 9 in) (2001 IFSA Finland World Record Breakers) (World Record)
- Weight over bar – 25.5 kg (56 lb) over 5.70 metres (18 ft 8 in) (2002 Den Helder Highland Games) (Former World Record)

== Honours ==
- third place World's Strongest Man (1998)
- first place World's Strongest Team (1998) w/Berend Veneberg
- first place Strongest man of the Netherlands (2001)
- eighth place World's Strongest Man (2001)
- first place NK Highland Games (2003)
- first place NK Highland Games (2004)

| Preceded by Berend Veneberg | Strongest man of the Netherlands; 2001 | Succeeded by Berend Veneberg |
