= Jarno Hams =

Dutch strongman

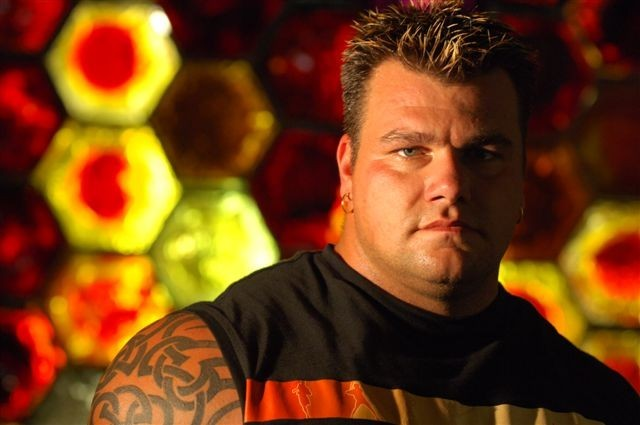
- Born: 1974 (age 50–51); Hengelo, Overijssel, Netherlands
- Occupation: Strongman
- Height: 6 ft 2 in (1.88 m)
- Title: 7 times Strongest Man of the Netherlands

Competition record

Strongman

Representing Netherlands

World's Strongest Man
Qualified	2002 World's Strongest Man	
Qualified	2003 World's Strongest Man	

IFSA Strongman World Championships
Qualified	2005 IFSA Strongman World Championships	
10th	2007 IFSA Strongman World Championships	

Strongman Champions League
9th	2009 Finland	
10th	2009 Netherlands	
10th	2010 Netherlands	
10th	2011 SCL Iceman Challenge II	
10th	2011 Germany	
3rd	2011 Canary Islands	
9th	2012 SCL Iceman Challenge III	
3rd	2012 Netherlands	
5th	2012 Portugal	

Strongest Man of the Netherlands
3rd	1999 Strongest Man of the Netherlands	
2nd	2001 Strongest Man of the Netherlands	
3rd	2002 Strongest Man of the Netherlands	
2nd	2003 Strongest Man of the Netherlands	
1st	2004 Strongest Man of the Netherlands	
1st	2005 Strongest Man of the Netherlands	
1st	2006 Strongest Man of the Netherlands	
1st	2007 Strongest Man of the Netherlands	
1st	2008 Strongest Man of the Netherlands	
1st	2010 Strongest Man of the Netherlands	
1st	2012 Strongest Man of the Netherlands	

World's Strongest Team
3rd	2001 w/Wout Zijlstra	
1st	2006 w/Edwin Hakvoort	

Jarno Hams (born 1974) is a strongman from the Netherlands. He participated in the World's Strongest Man in 2002 and 2003, but failed to qualify for the finals both times. Hams is a 7-time winner of Strongest Man of the Netherlands.

== Early life ==
Hams was born in Hengelo, Overijssel to a Dutch father and Finnish mother and grew up in Vroomshoop. One of his greatest hobbies is football; he played 19 years for the local football club VV Vroomshoopse Boys.

== Strongman ==
The first strongman contest he competed in was the 'Sterkste man van Oost-Nederland' (Strongest Man of East Netherlands) in 1996 where he finished third. After this he followed some training lessons from Berend Veneberg, then the Strongest Man of the Netherlands.

He managed his first podium finish at the Strongest Man of the Netherlands in 1999 where he finished third. In 2001 he placed second behind Wout Zijlstra. It would take him until 2004 to finally win the tournament for the first time.

He was invited to the 2002 World's Strongest Man and 2003 World's Strongest Man competitions but did not manage to get past the qualifying heats.

Hams competed together with Wout Zijlstra in the World's Strongest Team competition in 2001 where they finished third. In 2006 he would go on to win the contest with Edwin Hakvoort.

Hams competed in the IFSA Strongman World Championships in 2005 in the qualifying heats and 2007 where he placed 12th in the finals.

Due to an injury, he could not defend his title during the Strongest Man of the Netherlands on July 12, 2009 in Vroomshoop. Hams would go on to win Strongest Man of the Netherlands in 2010 and 2012.

Jarno's brother Eric Hams has also competed in Strongest Man of the Netherlands on several occasions.

Hams competes regularly in the Strongman Champions League series, achieving a podium finish in 2011 in the Canary Islands and in the Netherlands in 2012. In the 2012 SCL Holland event, Jarno set a new Dutch record in the log lift with a lift of 182.5 kg.

Jarno won his 7th Strongest Man of the Netherlands title on 18 July 2012. This win ties him with Berend Veneberg for most victories in the contest.

== Personal life ==
Jarno worked as a truck driver and as a doorman for a discothèque in Hengelo.

== Personal records ==
- Squat - 340 kg
- Deadlift - 380 kg (320 x 7)
- Bench press – 180 kg x 7
- Military press - 210 kg (national record)
- Log Lift - 185 kg (former national record, together with Alex Moonen, November 4, 2012)
- Atlas Stones - 210 kg
- Viking press – 220 kg (485 lb) (2007 IFSA Holland Grand Prix) (Joint-World Record)

== Honours ==
- 1st place Strongest Man of the Netherlands (2004)
- 1st place Strongest Man of the Netherlands (2005)
- 1st place World's Strongest Team, with Edwin Hakvoort (2006)
- 1st place Strongest Man of the Netherlands (2006)
- 1st place Strongest Man of the Netherlands (2007)
- 12th place World Championship (IFSA) (2007)
- 1st place Strongest Man of the Netherlands (2008)
- Qualifying heat World's Strongest Man 2002 and 2003.
- 1st place Strongest Man of the Netherlands (2010)
- 1st place Strongest Man of the Netherlands (2012)
- 4th place Strongest Man of the Netherlands (2014)
- 1st place Strongest Team of the Netherlands (2015) with his younger brother Eric Hams

Preceded by Peter Baltus; Simon Sulaiman; Jan Wagenaar	Strongest Man of the Netherlands; 2004-2008; 2010; 2012	Succeeded by Simon Sulaiman; Jan Wagenaar; Jitse Kramer
