= Strongest Man of the Netherlands =

Annual Competition in the Netherlands

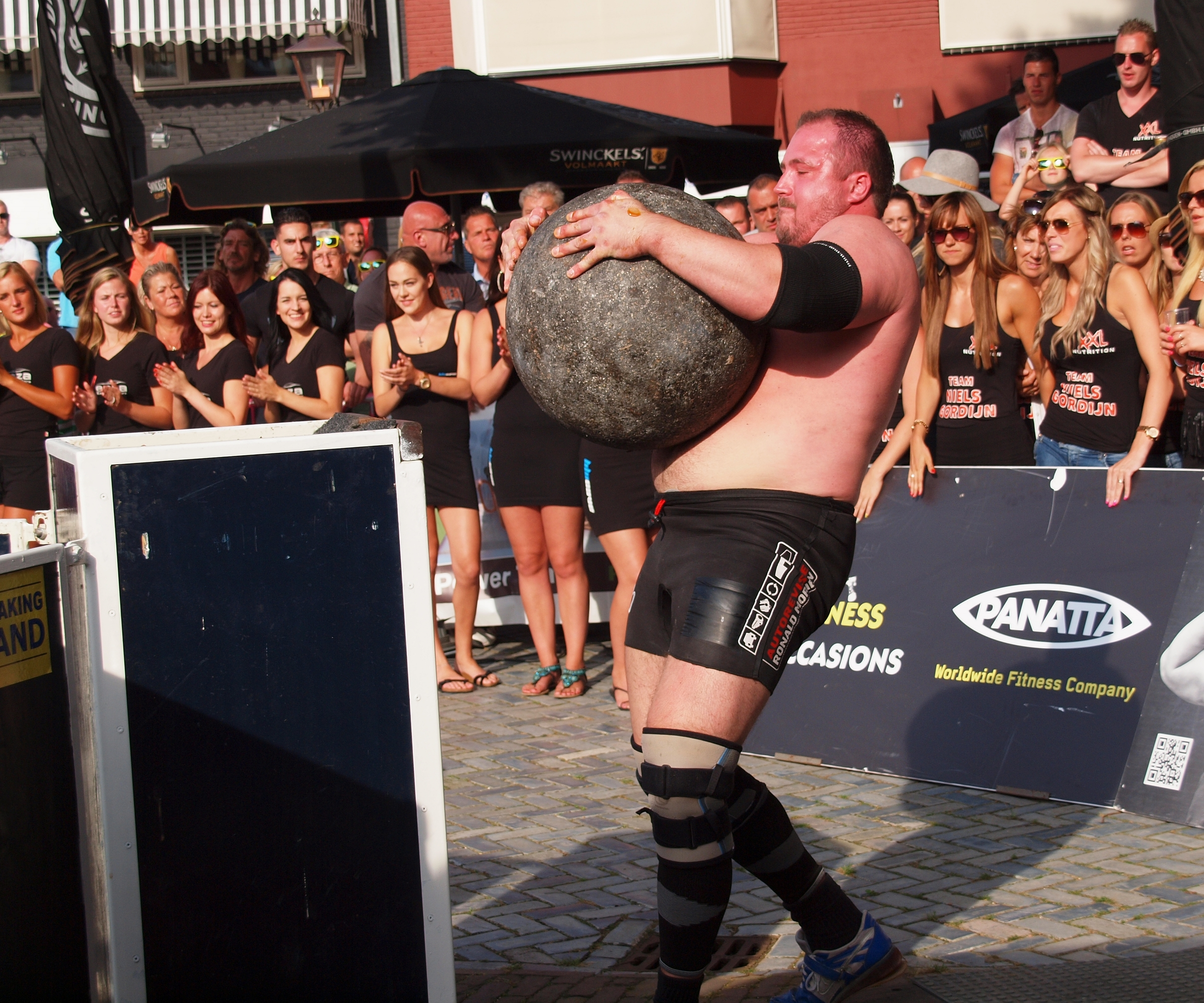
- Jitse Kramer (2015 Champion)

Tournament information
- Location: Varies, Netherlands
- Month played: July (on a Saturday)
- Established: 1979
- Format: Multi-event competition

Current champion
- (Netherlands) Kevin Hazeleger (2026)

Strongest Man of the Netherlands (Dutch: Sterkste Man van Nederland) is an annual strongman competition held in the Netherlands and featuring exclusively Dutch athletes. The contest was established in 1979, with Gerard Du Prie winning the inaugural contest. Berend Veneberg and Jarno Hams hold the record for most wins with 7 each. Alex Moonen and Kelvin de Ruiter holds 4 wins each, Ted van der Parre holds 3 wins, and Kevin Hazeleger, Gerard Du Prie and Jitse Kramer each have 2 wins in the contest.

The competition has been held throughout the Netherlands and throughout the 38 times it has been held, only Borculo, Winschoten, Almere, Enschede, Arnhem and Weert have hosted the competition more than once. It is one of the oldest strongman competitions in the world.

== Regular events ==
- Deadlift
- Log lift
- Atlas stones
- Truck pull
- Super yoke
- Farmer's walk

== Top 3 placings ==
Year	Champion	Runner-up	3rd place	City/town
1979	(Netherlands) Gerard Du Prie	(Netherlands) Jan Woudsma	(Netherlands) Robert Nuy	Hilversum television studios
1980–81	Event not held			
1982	(Netherlands) Simon Wulfse	(Netherlands) Gerard Du Prie	(Netherlands) Huub van Eck	Dronten (De Meerpaal)
1983	(Netherlands) Gerard Du Prie (2)	(To be confirmed)	(To be confirmed)	Arnhem (Open Air Museum)
1984	(Netherlands) Ab Wolders	(Netherlands) Cees de Vreugd	(Netherlands) Simon Wulfse	Alkmaar (Kaasmarkt)
1985-88	Event not held			
1989	(Netherlands) Tjalling van den Bosch	(Netherlands) Ab Wolders and (Netherlands) Ted Van Der Parre (tie)		Hindeloopen
1990	Event not held			
1991	(Netherlands) Ted van der Parre	(Netherlands) Wout Zijlstra	(Netherlands) Berend Veneberg	Ameland
1992	(Netherlands) Ted van der Parre (2)	(Netherlands) Berend Veneberg	(Netherlands) Rens Vrolijk	Zierikzee
1993	(Netherlands) Berend Veneberg	(Netherlands) Ted van der Parre	(Netherlands) Piet Flikweert	Leerdam
1994	(Netherlands) Ted van der Parre (3)	(Netherlands) Berend Veneberg	(Netherlands) Wout Zijlstra	Borculo
1995	(Netherlands) Berend Veneberg	(Netherlands) Paul Smeets	(Netherlands) Hans Schonewlle	Haaksbergen
1996	(Netherlands) Berend Veneberg (2)	(Netherlands) Wout Zijlstra	(Netherlands) Paul Smeets	Sneek
1997	(Netherlands) Berend Veneberg (3)	(Netherlands) Wout Zijlstra	(Netherlands) Paul Smeets	Almere
1998	Event not held			
1999	(Netherlands) Berend Veneberg (4)	(Netherlands) Peter Baltus	(Netherlands) Jarno Hams	Borculo
2000	(Netherlands) Berend Veneberg (5)	(Netherlands) Wout Zijlstra	(Netherlands) Eduard Leeflang	Enschede
2001	(Netherlands) Wout Zijlstra	(Netherlands) Jarno Hams	(Netherlands) Sander Du Burck	Borculo
2002	(Netherlands) Berend Veneberg (6)	(Netherlands) Sjaak Ruska	(Netherlands) Jarno Hams	Arnhem
2003	(Netherlands) Peter Baltus	(Netherlands) Jarno Hams	(Netherlands) Sjaak Ruska	Zandvoort
2004	(Netherlands) Jarno Hams	(Syria) Simon Sulaiman	(Netherlands) Edwin Hakvoort	Enschede
2005	(Netherlands) Jarno Hams (2)	(Netherlands) Dave Mossing	(Netherlands) Edwin Hakvoort	Vriezenveen
2006	(Netherlands) Jarno Hams (3)	(Netherlands) Sjaak Ruska	(Netherlands) Tom Jansen	Hellendoorn
2007	(Netherlands) Jarno Hams (4)	(Netherlands) Evert Kreuze	(Netherlands) Tom Jansen	Heerhugowaard
2008	(Netherlands) Jarno Hams (5)	(Netherlands) Richard van der Linden	(Netherlands) Evert Kreuze	Puttershoek
2009	(Syria) Simon Sulaiman	(Netherlands) Alex Moonen	(Netherlands) Jan Wagenaar	Vroomshoop
2010	(Netherlands) Jarno Hams (6)	(Netherlands) Richard van der Linden	(Netherlands) Alex Moonen	Hoofddorp
2011	(Netherlands) Jan Wagenaar	(Netherlands) Richard van der Linden	(Netherlands) Alex Moonen	Surhuisterveen
2012	(Netherlands) Jarno Hams (7)	(Netherlands) Jan Wagenaar	(Netherlands) Alex Moonen	Kerkrade
2013	(Netherlands) Jitse Kramer	(Netherlands) Jan Wagenaar	(Netherlands) Niels Gordijn	Boxtel
2014	(Netherlands) Alex Moonen	(Netherlands) Niels Gordijn	(Netherlands) Kelvin de Ruiter	Meppel (Gasgracht)
2015	(Netherlands) Jitse Kramer (2)	(Netherlands) Niels Gordijn	(Netherlands) Enzo Tauro	Borculo
2016	(Netherlands) Alex Moonen (2)	(Netherlands) Jitse Kramer	(Netherlands) Enzo Tauro	Zwolle
2017	(Netherlands) Alex Moonen (3)	(Netherlands) Enzo Tauro	(Netherlands) Kelvin de Ruiter	Hengelo
2018	(Netherlands) Alex Moonen (4)	(Netherlands) Kelvin de Ruiter	(Netherlands) Enzo Tauro	Schinveld
2019	(Netherlands) Kelvin de Ruiter	(Netherlands) Joost Heutinck	(Netherlands) Teun Moors	Weert
2020	Event not held			
2021	(Netherlands) Kelvin de Ruiter (2)	(Syria) George Sulaiman	(Netherlands) Angelo van der Pas	Kampen
2022	(Netherlands) Kelvin de Ruiter (3)	(Syria) George Sulaiman	(Netherlands) Kevin de Jong	Almere
2023	(Netherlands) Kelvin de Ruiter (4)	(Netherlands) Kevin Hazeleger	(Syria) George Sulaiman	Winschoten
2024	(Netherlands) Kevin Hazeleger	(Netherlands) Kelvin de Ruiter	(Netherlands) Max Gelder	Winschoten
2025	(Netherlands) Kevin Hazeleger (2)	(Netherlands) Max Gelder	(Netherlands) Kelvin de Ruiter	Weert
2026	(Netherlands) Kevin Hazeleger (3)	(Netherlands) Sander van Zutphen	(Netherlands) Luca Heijster	Bolsward

=== Repeat champions ===
Champion	Times & years
(Netherlands) Berend Veneberg	7 (1993, 1995, 1996, 1997, 1999, 2000, 2002)
(Netherlands) Jarno Hams	7 (2004, 2005, 2006, 2007, 2008, 2010, 2012)
(Netherlands) Alex Moonen	4 (2014, 2016, 2017, 2018)
(Netherlands) Kelvin de Ruiter	4 (2019, 2021, 2022, 2023)
(Netherlands) Ted van der Parre	3 (1991, 1992, 1994)
(Netherlands) Kevin Hazeleger	3 (2024, 2025, 2026)
(Netherlands) Gerard Du Prie	2 (1979, 1983)
(Netherlands) Jitse Kramer	2 (2013, 2015)

== Notes ==
1. According to the results of realdutchpower the event was held in 1997 and not held in 1998.
