= Simon Sulaiman =

Syrian strength athlete (born 1972)

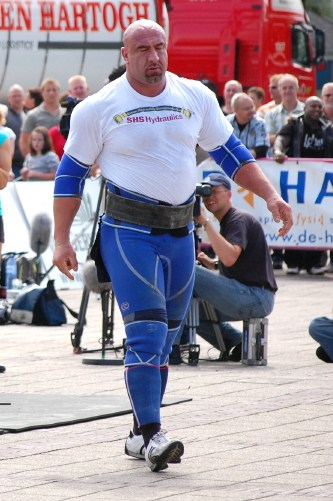
- Born: Simon Sulaiman; 1971; Syria
- Occupation: Strongman
- Height: 6 ft 2 in (1.88 m)
- Title: Strongest man of the Netherlands 2009
- Website: www.simon-sulaiman.nl

Competition record

Strongman

Representing Netherlands

World's Strongest Man
Qualified	2009 World's Strongest Man reserve

Strongest man of the Netherlands
2nd	2004
1st	2010

Simon Sulaiman (born 1972) is a Syrian-born Dutch strongman competitor and entrant to the World's Strongest Man competition.

== Biography ==
Sulaiman was born in Syria in 1972 and moved to the Netherlands in 1989. He achieved a fourth-place finish in the 2002 Strongest man of the Netherlands competition. Two years later he took second spot but it was not until 2009 that he finally won the competition in his adopted homeland. As a result of this he was invited to attend the 2009 World's Strongest Man as one two reserves. In 2008 and 2009 he was a regular competitor in the Strongman Champions League grand prix's though did not manage a podium finish.

He is also the head strength and conditioning trainer for former Strikeforce Heavyweight Champion and K-1 athlete Alistair Overeem.

== Strongman competition record ==
- 2002
  - 4. - Strongest man of the Netherlands
- 2003
  - 5. - Strongest man of the Netherlands
- 2004
  - 2. - Strongest man of the Netherlands
- 2006
  - 11. - Strongest man of the Netherlands
- 2007
  - 11. - Strongest man of the Netherlands
- 2008
  - 11. - Strongest man of the Netherlands
- 2009
  - 1. - Strongest man of the Netherlands

== Best performances (powerlifting) ==
- Squat - 300 kg
- Deadlift - 360 kg
