= Ab Wolders =

- Born: Albertus Wolders; 10 June 1951 (age 73); Netherlands
- Other names: "The World's fastest Strongman"
- Occupation(s): Strongman, Powerlifting
- Height: 6 ft 0 in (1.83 m)
- Children: Albert and Robert-Jan
- Website: Official website

Competition record

Strongman

Representing Netherlands

World's Strongest Man
2nd	1984 World's Strongest Man	
3rd	1986 World's Strongest Man	
4th	1988 World's Strongest Man	
2nd	1989 World's Strongest Man	

Europe's Strongest Man
1st	1987	

Strongest man of the Netherlands
1st	1984	
1st	1985	
2nd	1989 tie w/Ted van der Parre	

World Muscle Power Championships
3rd	1989	

Pure Strength
3rd	1988 w/Tjalling van den Bosch	
4th	1989 w/Tjalling van den Bosch	

World Strongman Challenge
2nd	1987	

Powerlifting

Representing Netherlands

IPF World Powerlifting Championships
3rd	1982	125kg
2nd	1983	110kg
1st	1984	125kg
1st	2012	-120kg (masters)

EPF European Powerlifting Championships
2nd	1982	125kg
2nd	1983	125kg
1st	1984	125kg

Albertus 'Ab' Wolders (born 10 June 1951) is a former strongman and world champion Powerlifter from the Netherlands. He was runner-up at the World's Strongest Man competition on two occasions, placing second to Jón Páll Sigmarsson in 1984 and to Jamie Reeves in 1989. He finished 3rd at the World's Strongest Man games in 1986, 4th in 1988, 1st at Europe's Strongest Man in 1987 and was twice Strongest man of the Netherlands. Ab won the IPF World Powerlifting Championships in 1984 in the 125 kg category.

Wolders started competing again at an older age. In 2012 and 2014 he became world champion powerlifting, Masters III.

Wolders competed at 6 ft 0 in (183 cm) and approximately 276 pounds (125 kg) during his strongman career.

== Personal records ==
- Basque circle (traditional) – 228 kg (503 lb) for 70.00 metres (229 ft 8 in) (1989 World's Strongest Man) (World Record)
- Car flip – 700 kg (1,543 lb) x 3 half flips in 20.08 seconds (1989 World's Strongest Man) (World Record)

== Honours ==
- 1st place IPF World Powerlifting Championships 125 kg class (1984)
- 1st place EPF European Powerlifting Championships 125 kg class (1984)
- 1st place Strongest man of the Netherlands (1984)
- 2nd place 1984 World's Strongest Man
- 1st place Strongest man of the Netherlands (1985)
- 3rd place 1986 World's Strongest Man
- 1st place Europe's Strongest Man (1987)
- 4th place 1988 World's Strongest Man
- 2nd place 1989 World's Strongest Man
- 1st place IPF European Powerlifting Championships Master III (705 kg total) -120 kg class (2012)
- 1st place IPF World Masters III Champion (740,5 total) (world records: squat 280.5 kg and total 740.5 kg (Plzeň) -120 kg (2014)
