= Manjit Singh (strongman) =

Indian-British strongman

Manjit Singh is a strongman originally from India, who moved to Leicestershire in 1977. He holds a number of Guinness World Records for feats of strength concerned with pulling large obstacles. Singh has recently come to greater attention in the UK after his appearance in the third series of Britain's Got Talent.

== Record breaking ==
He is a serial breaker and setter of Guinness World Records and at last count is noted as holding 68, including pulling an empty double-decker bus over 55 feet with his teeth, pulling a double-decker with 54 passengers on board with one hand for a distance of 180 feet and pulling a similar bus with 30 people aboard for 256 feet using only his ponytail, using his ears to lift 85 kg and hauling an 8 tonne mobile library for 1800 cm. In 1995 he pulled a 203,000-pound Vulcan bomber for 15.24 cm using a harness round his body.

When Manjit has told doctors about his feats of strength using his teeth and ears, they continually advise him that doing it again would be very bad for his health. His response to their warnings is to, "... ask them if they've ever been in a gym." A lifelong fitness adherent, Singh trains in the gym up to four times daily and runs miles every day.

== Britain's Got Talent ==
He rose to national attention by appearing on the first episode of series three of Britain's Got Talent, though he had previously appeared on the TV show Record Breakers. On his Britain's Got Talent audition, he blew into and burst a hot water bottle, before pulling a minivan with his ear. He was not chosen as one of the 40 semi-finalists because he was out at the time.

== Other activities ==
Singh is the Director of a security company he set up in 1998.

He also raised charitable donations for a small sports and fitness school Manjit plans to build for the poor children of Mahilpur, his native village near the city of Hoshiarpur in Punjab, through his feats of strength. His charity is called the Manjit Fitness Academy. He also appeared on the Jay Leno Show in LA where he lifted Miss USA with his ears. He has been on Sony TV 'Entertainment ke liey khuch bhi karega' where he picked Imran Khan film actor with his hair. In July 2011 he managed to lift 14 kg with his eye socket setting a new world record for the Guinness Book.
