= Signor Lawanda =

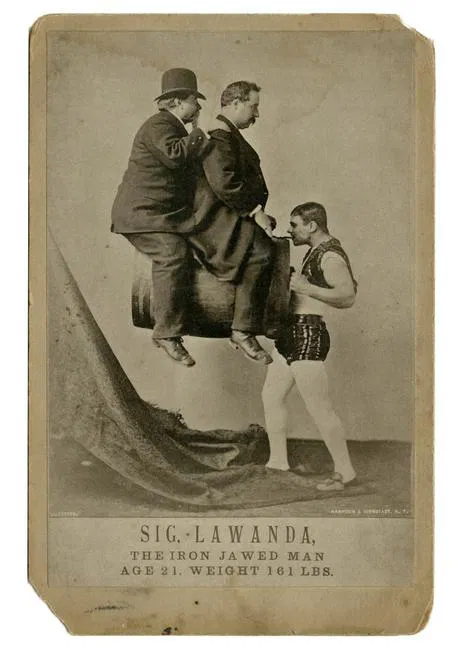
- Photograph of Signor Lawanda lifting a barrel with two men sitting astride it with his jaw.

Personal information
- Nicknames: Iron Jawed Man, Signor Lawanda
- Born: Hugh David Evans Bethlehem, Pennsylvania, US
- Spouse: Nellie McAleer

Hugh David Evans (August 7, 1849 – November 14, 1934), known professionally as Signor Lawanda, was an American strongman and stage performer, dubbed the original "Iron-Jawed Man." He gained national attention for his feats of strength, including lifting a 1,400-pound horse with his teeth while performing with fellow showman P.T. Barnum.

== Early life ==
Evans was born in Bethlehem, Pennsylvania. His mother, a Pennsylvania Dutch woman reputed for her physical strength, died two weeks after his birth from puerperal sepsis. His father, David Robert Evans, was a Welsh immigrant and slate miner. By the age of nine, Evans worked in the slate quarries of Granville, New York, performing physically demanding labor that contributed to his later abilities as a strongman.

At age eleven, Evans attended a circus in Rutland, Vermont, with his father, an experience that inspired his later career in performance. By sixteen, he was undefeated in local lifting competitions.

== Career ==
In 1865, Evans left home to join a traveling performance troupe led by a man named Comical Brown. He gained fame for feats such as lifting barrels of water with multiple men atop them, tossing a thirty-five-pound chair into the air and catching it with his teeth, and biting silver dollars in half for audience donations.

Evans performed with prominent entertainers of the era, including Dan Rice, Tony Pastor, and P.T. Barnum. During his year-and-a-half engagement with Barnum, Evans earned the nickname "Iron-Jawed Man" for lifting a 1,400-pound horse with his teeth.

In June 1882, at Forest Gardens in Boston, Evans famously lifted a massive barrel of water with one arm in front of a crowd that included world heavyweight champion John L. Sullivan. Sullivan attempted the lift unsuccessfully before Evans accomplished it, after which the two men later developed a friendship.

Evans eventually settled in Detroit, Michigan, performing with E.W. "Pop" Wiggins and concluding his career at the Wonderland Theatre. He also performed across Canada. Despite his success, Evans often reflected on his early life in his trouping days.

== Personal life ==
Evans married Nellie McAleer, a Canadian farmer’s daughter, in January 1880. They had four sons.

Evans died on November 14, 1934, in Detroit, at age 85.
