= Pure Strength =

Tournament information
- Location: Various
- Established: 1987
- Final year: 1990
- Format: Multi-event competition

Final champion
- (United States); Bill Kazmaier and O.D. Wilson (1990)

Pure Strength was a vintage Strongman championship held for four consecutive years from 1987 to 1990 in Scotland and England which was conceptualized and organized by Dutchman Tjalling van den Bosch. The championships were revered for their creative events combining historical and contemporary elements together.

Some historians and analysts regard the 1987 first edition of the championships, as the replacement for World's Strongest Man which didn't happen that year. The next three editions were team championships, which later inspired the World's Strongest Team.

== Championship history ==
=== 1987 (individual championship) ===
The first year of the championships was initially known as "Pure Strength Challenge" and it was an individual competition featuring only Bill Kazmaier, Geoff Capes and Jón Páll Sigmarsson - the three men who had collectively won all seven of the World's Strongest Man titles from 1980-86, and taken most of the other podium places too (Sigmarsson and Kazmaier were also to take 1st and 2nd in WSM 1988): although this was the first occasion that Kazmaier and Sigmarsson competed against each other at the top of their game, Capes having competed against both. The competition was held at Huntly Castle in Aberdeenshire, Scotland. Jón Páll dominated and won 8 out of 10 events to become the champion ahead of Kazmaier, while Capes - already trailing in third place - suffered an injury late on, and missed the last two events. Events featured claymore front hold, McGlashen stones, cannon pull, caber toss, weight over bar, vertical hoist, log lift, Samson's barrow, cart-wheel deadlift and Dinnie stones; and the three athletes collectively broke eight world records.

Some strength historians and analysts regard it as the replacement for World's Strongest Man in that year while many believe it to be Jón Páll's most dominant performance ever, surpassing all four of his World's Strongest Man victories.

=== 1988–1990 (team championships) ===
In 1988, the championships became a two-man team competition held at Allington Castle in Allington, Kent, England. The teams were from the United States, Great Britain, the Netherlands and Australia. Team USA ultimately emerged victorious, with team members Bill Kazmaier and Stuart Thompson. Unique events included tug of war, brick lift, and bow and axe static hold.

In 1989, team Iceland claimed victory with team members Hjalti Árnason and Magnús Ver Magnússon over team United States, team Great Britain and team Netherlands. The competition featured 16 events which spanned over 4 days. Unique events included sward and chalice hold, scrum push, lumberjack's log chop, and sack, hay and barrel loading race.

In 1990, team USA won with Bill Kazmaier and O.D. Wilson, defeating team Iceland, team Great Britain and team Netherlands. Like in previous year, it also featured 16 events which spanned over 4 days. Unique events included tram pull, pole push and car flip.

== Placements ==
Year	Champion	Runner-up	3rd place	Location
Pure Strength 1987	(Iceland) Jón Páll Sigmarsson	(United States) Bill Kazmaier	(United Kingdom) Geoff Capes	Huntly Castle; Aberdeenshire, Scotland
Pure Strength II 1988	(United States); Bill Kazmaier; Stuart Thompson	(United Kingdom); Jamie Reeves; Mark Higgins	(Netherlands); Ab Wolders; Tjalling van den Bosch	Allington Castle; Kent, England
Pure Strength III 1989	(Iceland); Hjalti Árnason; Magnús Ver Magnússon	(United States); Bill Kazmaier; O.D. Wilson	(United Kingdom); Jamie Reeves; Mark Higgins	Stirling Castle; Stirling, Scotland
Pure Strength IV 1990	(United States); Bill Kazmaier; O.D. Wilson	(Iceland); Hjalti Árnason; Magnús Ver Magnússon	(Netherlands); Tjalling van den Bosch; Ted van der Parre	England

== Venues ==
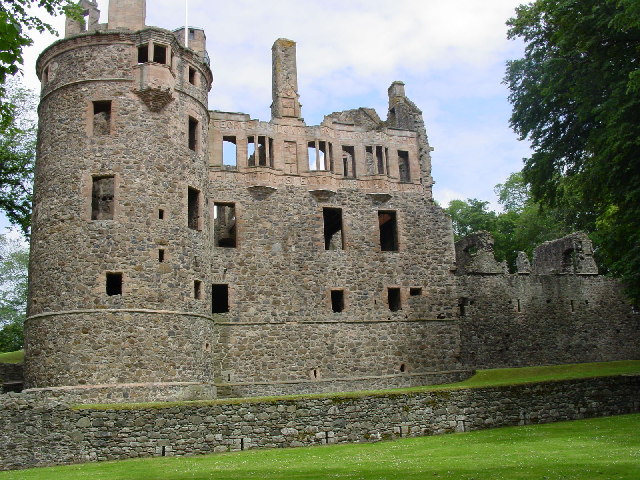
Huntly Castle was the location for Pure Strength '87

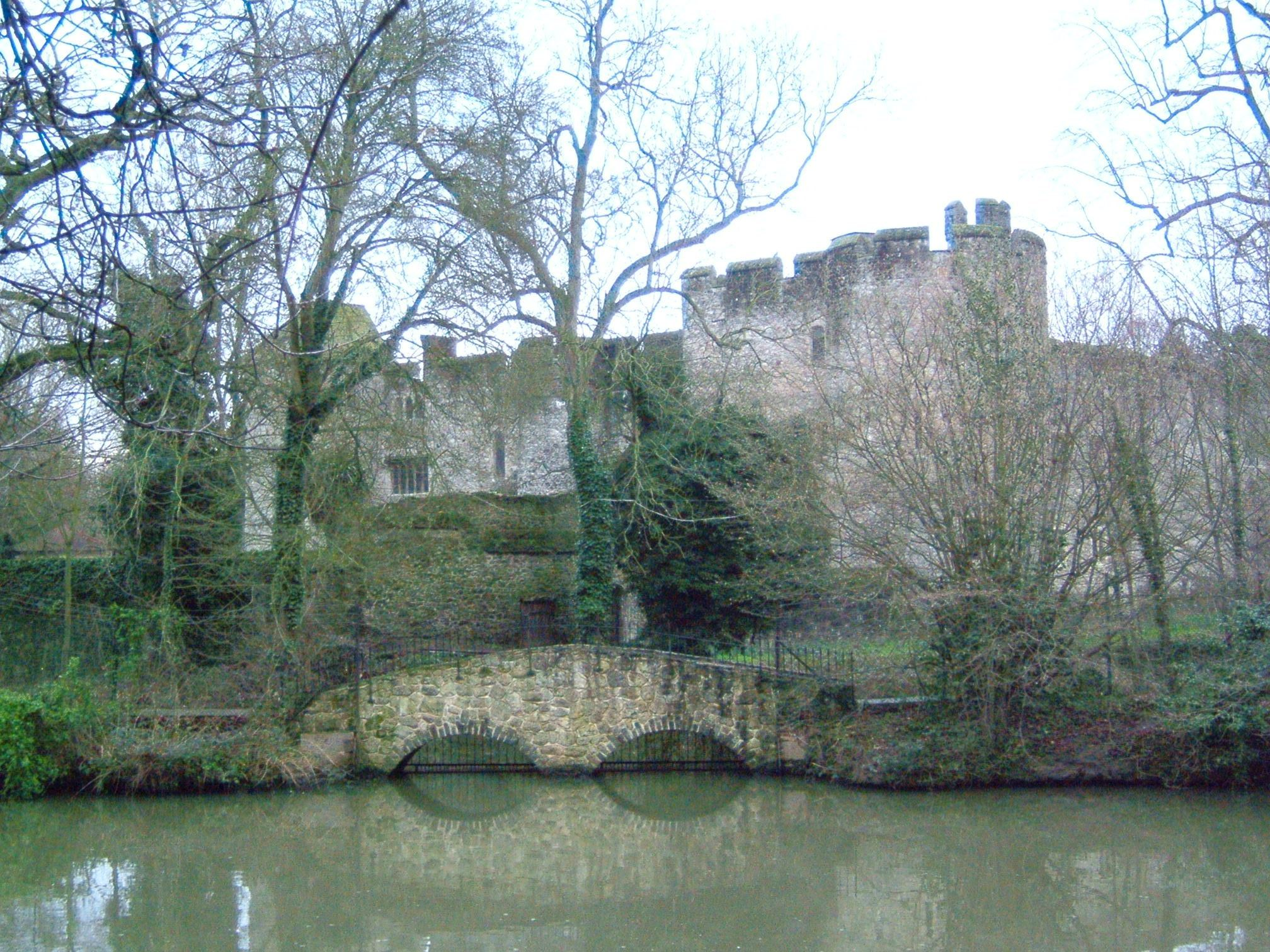
Allington Castle was the location for Pure Strength II in 1988

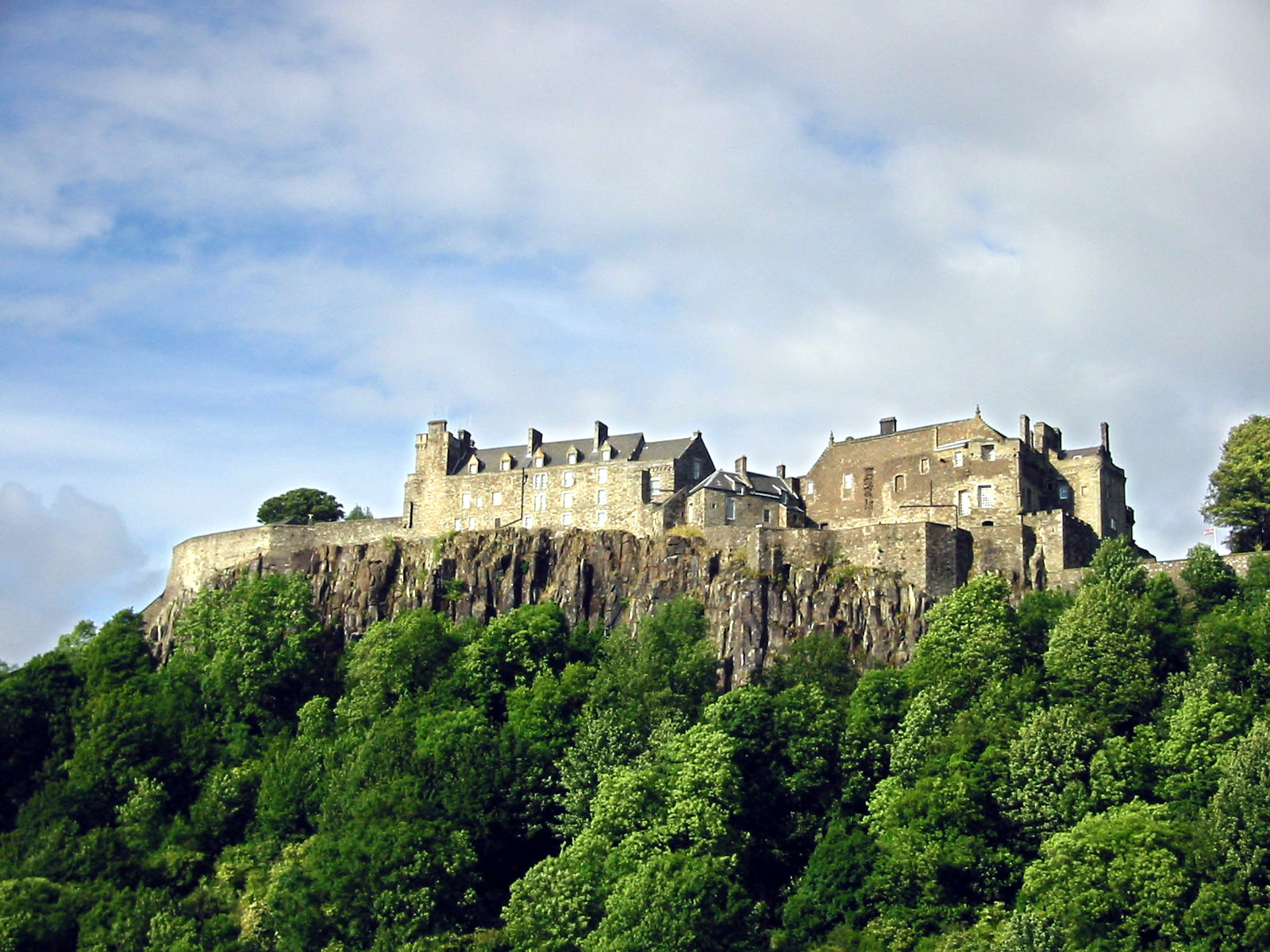
Stirling Castle was the setting for Pure Strength III in 1989
