= Gerard du Prie =

Dutch powerlifter and strongman (1937–2020)

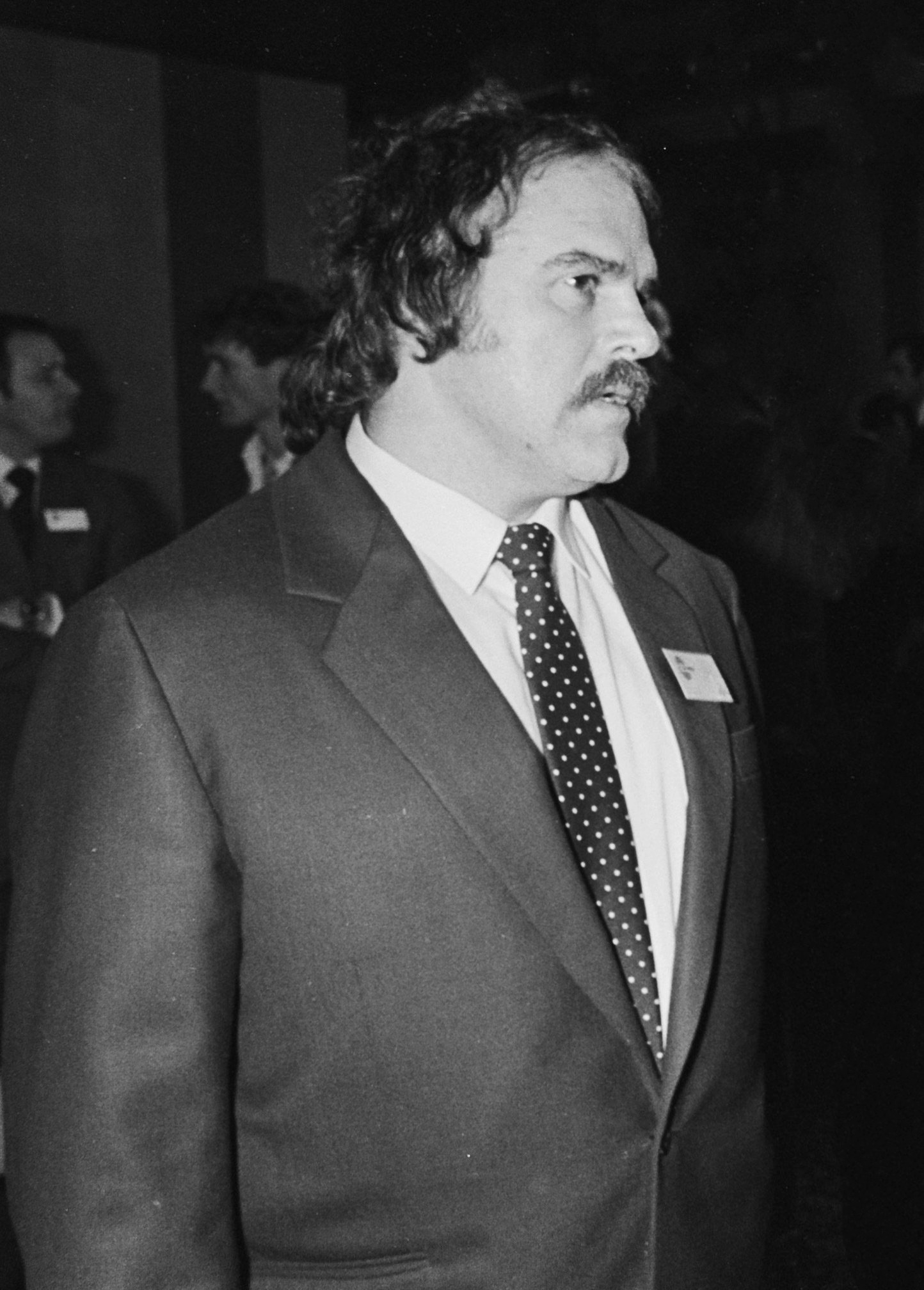
Gerard du Prie in 1981

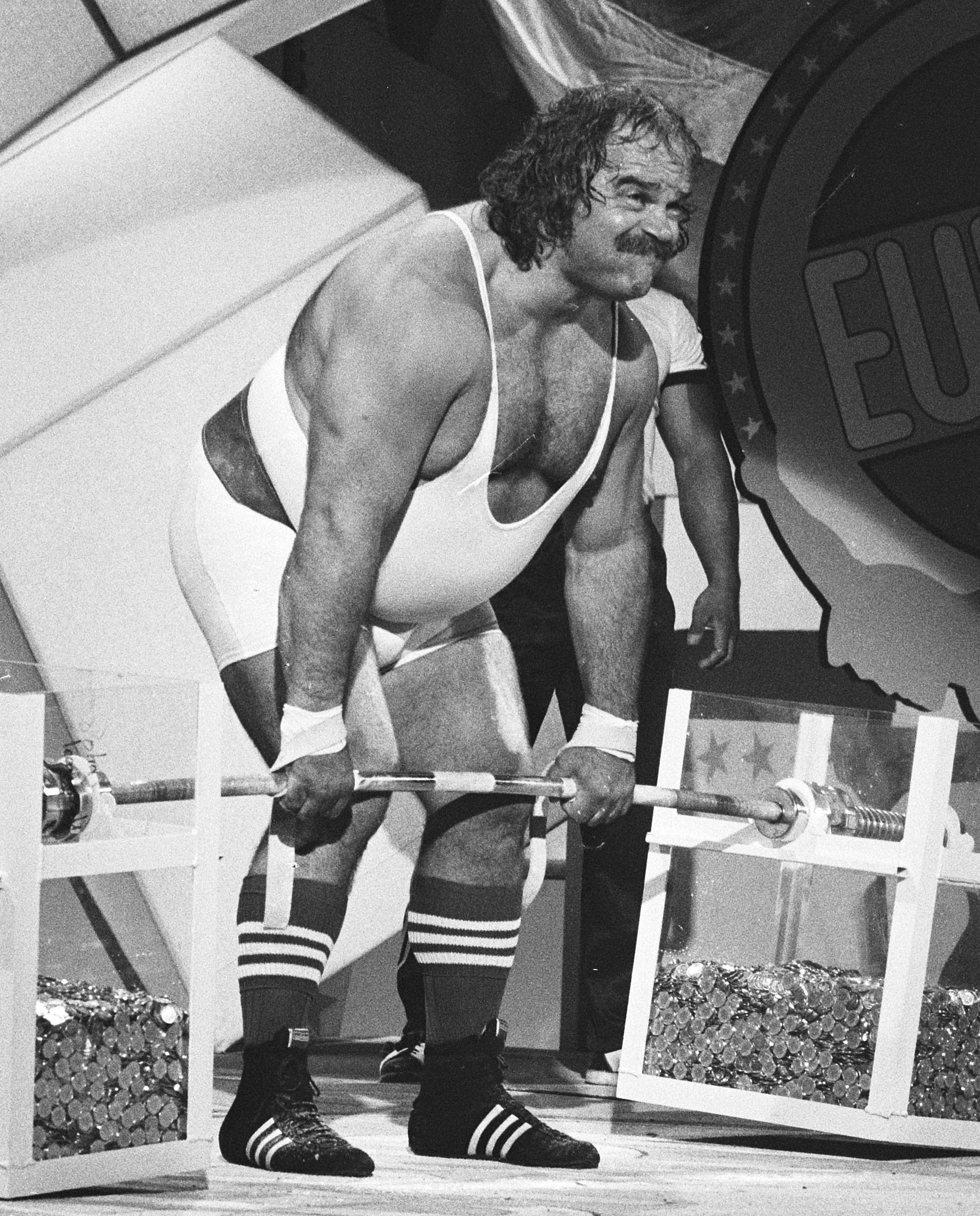
Gerard du Prie on a TV show in 1982

Gerard du Prie (23 May 1937 – 11 March 2020) was a strongman and powerlifter from Egmond aan Zee in the Netherlands. He won two world titles in the superheavyweight class (+125 kg) at the World Masters Powerlifting Championships in 1983 and 1986, both times competing in the 40–49 age group. He was the Strongest Man of the Netherlands in 1979 and runner-up in 1982. He finished in eighth place at the 1980 World's Strongest Man competition.
