= Cees de Vreugd =

Personal information
- Born: 9 March 1952 Katwijk, Netherlands
- Died: 7 October 1998 (aged 46)
- Occupation: Strongman Powerlifter
- Height: 6 ft 1 in (1.85 m)
Medal record
Strongman
Representing Netherlands
World's Strongest Man
3rd	1985
Strongest man of the Netherlands
4th	1982
2nd	1984
Powerlifting
Representing Netherlands
IPF World Powerlifting Championships
1st	1985	+125kg
Dutch National Powerlifting Championships
1st	1983	+125kg

Cees de Vreugd, also known as "Kees de Vreugd" (9 March 1952 – 7 October 1998) was a butcher, strongman and powerlifter from Katwijk, Netherlands. He finished third at the World's Strongest Man games in 1985.

After competing in soccer in his youth, De Vreugd started weightlifting very late at the age of 29 in 1981. In 1982 he began competing as a powerlifter, and won the Dutch National Championships in 1983. De Vreugd won the IPF World Powerlifting Championships in the +125 kg class in 1985. De Vreugd was the first European to total 2,200 lb (1,000 kg) in powerlifting in 1985, including a 927 lb (420 kg) squat. Later that year he made a total of 1002,5 kg which was the Dutch record for 32 years (until November 2017). Without using a bench shirt (what holds the upper body tight) it's still the raw Dutch record. The squat (420 kg) earlier in 1985 still stands as the Dutch record in April 2022. De Vreugd competed at 6 ft 1 in (185 cm) and approximately 311 lb (142 kg) during his strongman career.

== Death ==
In 1998 De Vreugd died of a heart attack. De Vreugd is buried at a cemetery named Duinrust, located in Katwijk aan Zee.

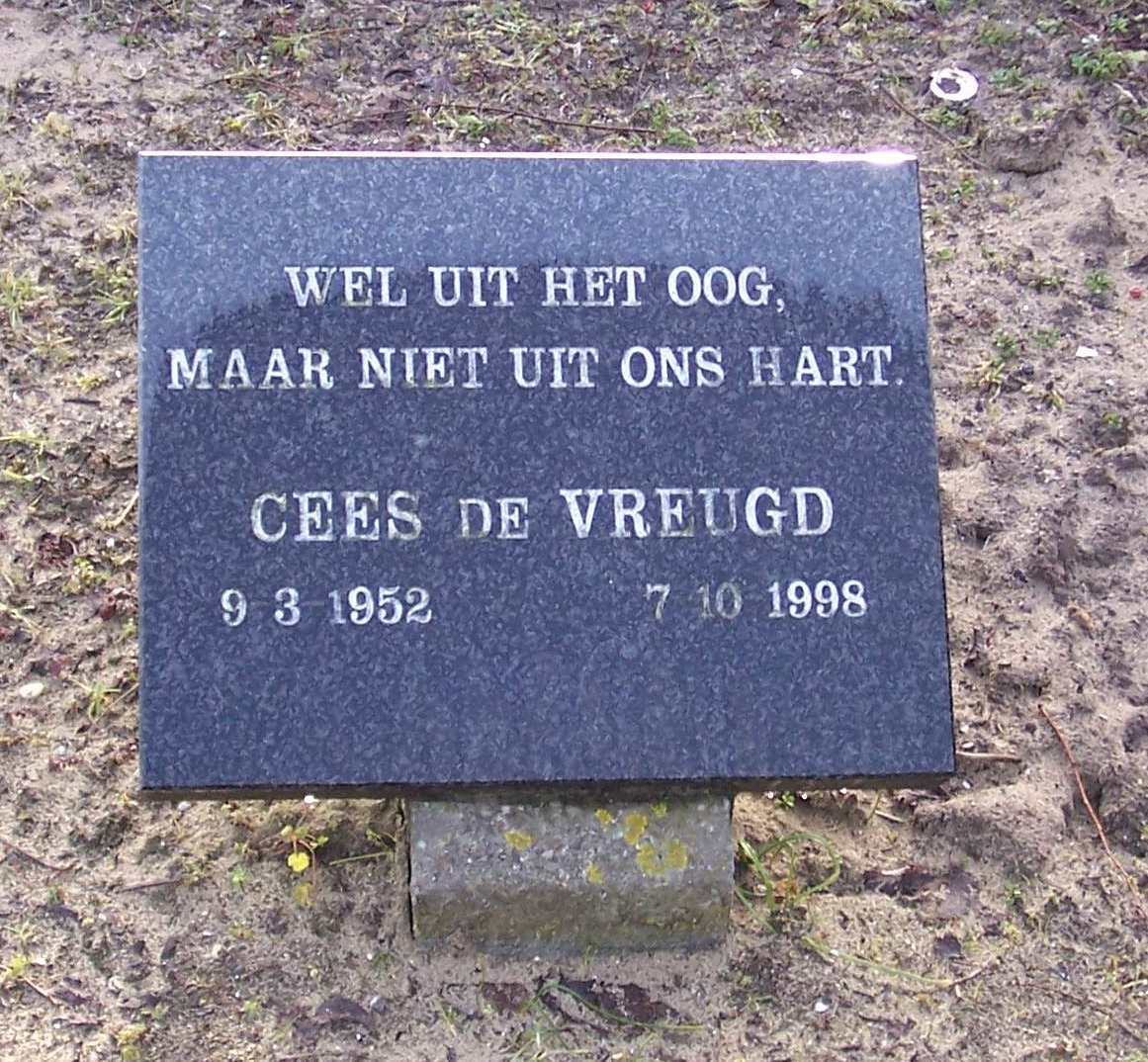
Tombstone, Cees de Vreugd - Duinrust, Katwijk aan Zee

== Honours ==
- Second place Strongest man of the Netherlands (1984)
- Third place World's Strongest Man (1985)
