= Wolsum =

- Village
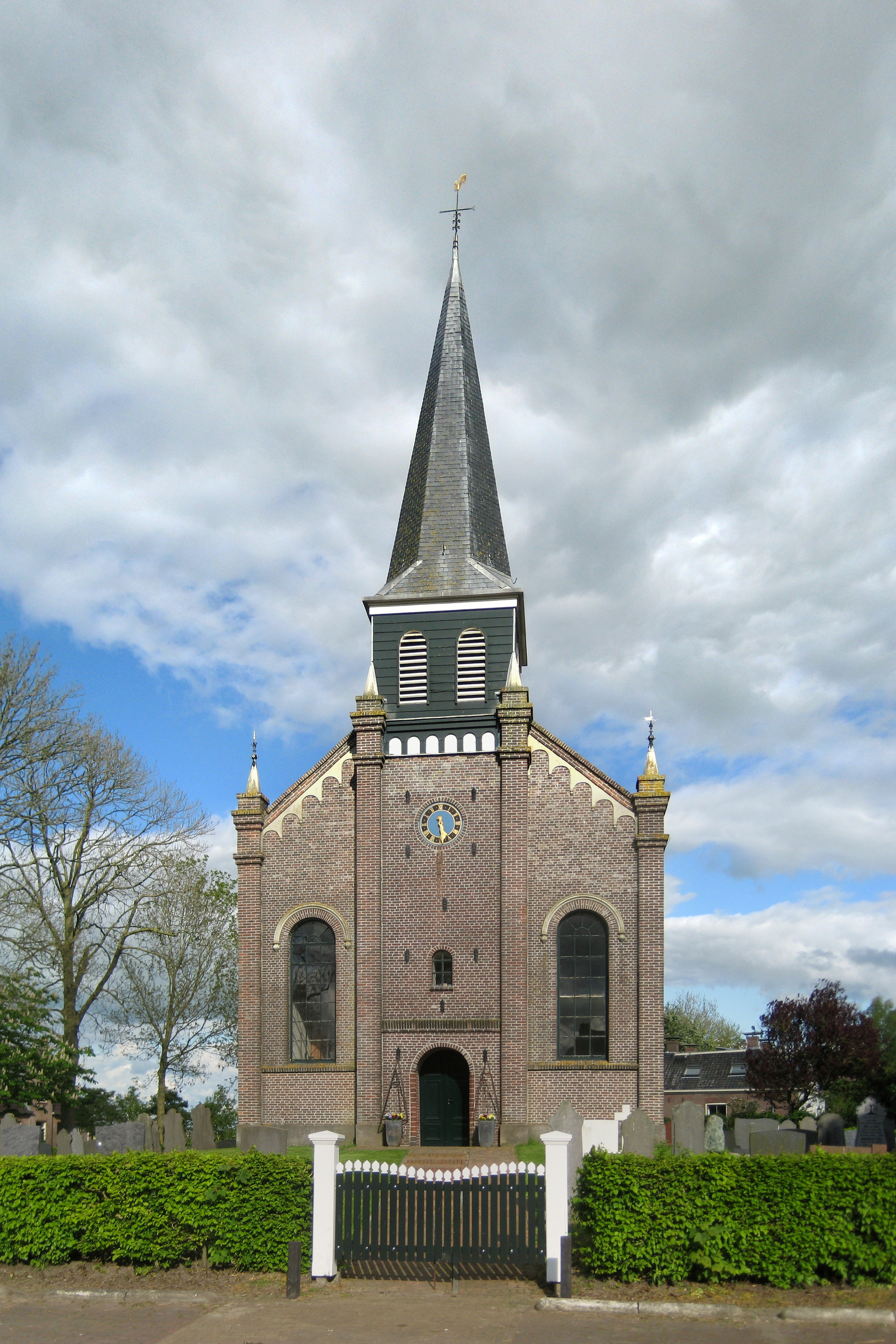
- Wolsum Church

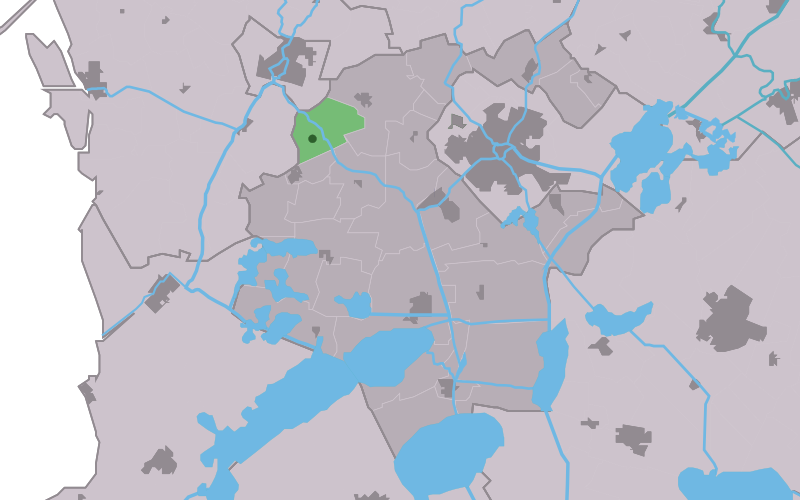
- Location in the former Wymbritseradiel municipality

- Location in the Netherlands Wolsum (Netherlands)
- Country: Netherlands
- Province: Friesland
- Municipality: Súdwest-Fryslân

Population (2017)
  - Total: 160
- Time zone: UTC+1 (CET)
  - Summer (DST): UTC+2 (CEST)
- Postal code: 8774
- Dialing code: 0515

Wolsum is a village in Súdwest-Fryslân municipality in the province of Friesland, the Netherlands. It had a population of around 160 in January 2017.

== History ==
Before 2011, the village was part of the Wymbritseradiel municipality. The village originated in the Middle Ages in the northwest corner of the pits southeast of Bolsward. The village was unlocked with two ferries to the Wimerts. The earliest portrayal of the village on the acreage map in the Schotanus atlas of 1664 shows a compact village building around the church and here and there are farms that are sometimes concentrated in a hamlet.

The 'Present State of Friesland' wrote in 1788: Wolsum, not far from Bolswerd, and close to the voyage, which runs from the Nieuwe Zyl, so that one can freely disembark and arrive here by ship. Among this Village {…} are the neighborhoods Laard, Jouwsard, Remsard, Five House and Ytzum. The neighborhoods still exist and at the bridge over the canal, the neighborhood Wolsum Chain also emerged. On the map in the Eekhoffatlas from 1851 there are three houses, of which the map of 1716 only mentions the Wolsumer Chain House. In Fiifhûs there are already three houses in 1851 more than the name indicates. The other neighborhoods consist of farms. In the middle of the 19th century there are eleven houses in the neighboring village and behind the church the compact church buildings are still visible.

== Church ==
The church was built around 1870 to replace a medieval predecessor not dedicated to St. Martin. It is a hall church with a three-sided closure in a typical mixed style. The masonry is organized by licenses and there are large arched windows. The corners of the façade and those of the largely built-in tower have decorative pinacle crowns. The facade is covered by a circular frieze. The church has a 17th century pulpit. The elevated, yet sharply towered tower has a wooden superstructure with double reed holes on each side. In the tower hangs a song bell from the 15th century.

== Community ==
Village house the Wilsum House was renovated in 1986 by the residents. The children go to the schools near the village.

Population 1954 – 283 1959 – 237 1964 – 221 1969 – 173 1973 – 150 2006 – 145 2009 – 138 2011 – 134 A famous Wolsumer is Wout Zijlstra
