= Simon Wulfse =

Dutch strongman (born 1952)

Personal information
- Born: January 12, 1952 (age 74) Dordrecht, Netherlands
- Occupation: Strongman
- Height: 185 cm (6 ft 1 in)
Medal record
Strongman
Representing Netherlands
World's Strongest Man
| 3rd | 1983 |
Europe's Strongest Man
| 1st | 1983 |
Strongest man of the Netherlands
| 1st | 1982 |
| 3rd | 1984 |
World Muscle Power Championships
| 3rd | 1986 |
| 3rd | 1987 |

Simon Wulfse (born January 12, 1952, in Dordrecht) is a strongman from the Netherlands. He finished third at the World's Strongest Man in 1983. Wulfse won the Europe's Strongest Man title in 1983, his career best finish. He finished first in Strongest man of the Netherlands in 1982, and third in 1984. Wulfse also finished third at the 1986 and 1987 World Muscle Power Championships.

He was arrested in 1989 and convicted of drug smuggling.

== Honours ==
- 1st place Strongest man of the Netherlands (1982)
- 1st place Europe's Strongest Man (1983)
- 3rd place World's Strongest Man (1983)
