= Jarek Dymek =

Polish strongman competitor

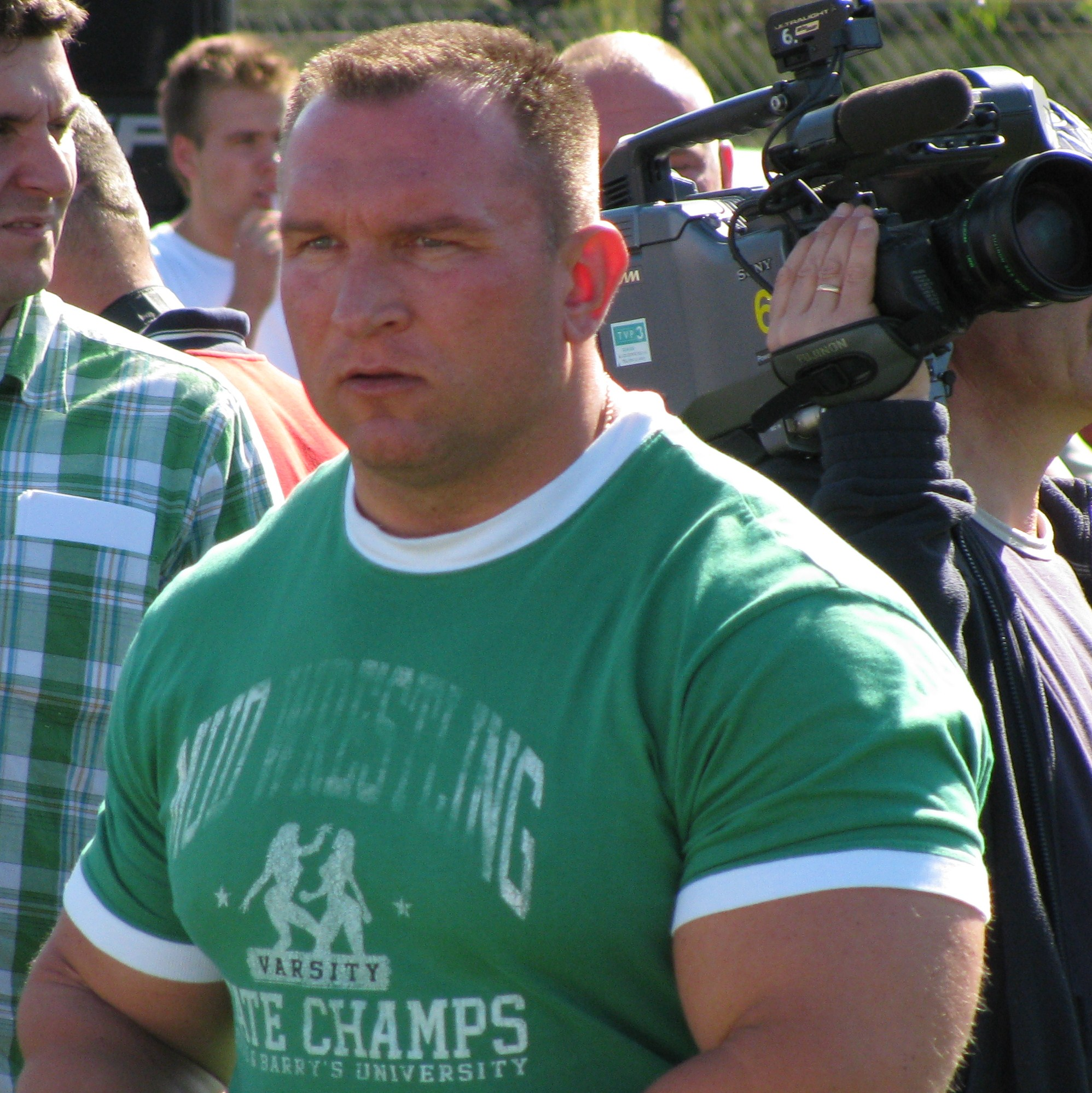

Personal information
- Born: Jarek Dymek; January 21, 1971 (age 55) Malbork, Poland
- Occupation: Strongman
- Height: 5 ft 10 in (1.78 m)
Medal record
Strongman
Representing Poland
World's Strongest Man
7th	2001
9th	2002
6th	2003
4th	2005
8th	2006
Qualified	2007
Qualified	2008
Qualified	2009
Europe's Strongest Man
3rd	2000
2nd	2002
2nd	2003
1st	2005
World's Strongest Team
2nd	2000 w/Mariusz Pudzianowski
2nd	2001 w/Ireneusz Kuras
3rd	2002 w/Mariusz Pudzianowski
1st	2003 w/Mariusz Pudzianowski
1st	2004 w/Mariusz Pudzianowski
1st	2005 w/Mariusz Pudzianowski
Giants Live
1st	2009 Poland
Poland's Strongest Man
1st	2001
1st	2002
1st	2005
2nd	2007
Strongman Super Series
2nd	2006 Poland Grand Prix
2nd	2007 Viking Power Super Series

Jarek Dymek (born January 21, 1971) is a Polish former strongman competitor. He competed in the World's Strongest Man event eight times, making the finals five times; his best finish was fourth in 2005. In the same year he won Europe's Strongest Man, his career best win. Dymek is also a three-time winner of the World's Strongest Team event, with his team-mate being five-time World's Strongest Man champion Mariusz Pudzianowski.

== Personal Records ==
- Deadlift – 380 kg (838 lb) (2008 Viking Power Challenge)
- Squat – 320 kg (705 lb)
- Bench press – 240 kg (529 lb)
- Log press – 170 kg (375 lb) (2009 Viking Power Challenge)
- Axle press – 170 kg (375 lb) (2008 Viking Power Challenge)
- Leviathan press (incline log press) – 120 kg (265 lb) x 14 reps (2002 IFSA Finland Grand Prix) (Joint-World Record)
