= Kelvin de Ruiter =

Dutch strongman

Personal information
- Born: 31 March 1988 (age 38)
- Occupation: Strongman
- Height: 6 ft 8 in (2.03 m)
- Weight: 168 kg (370 lb)
Medal record
Strongman
Representing Netherlands
World's Strongest Viking
9th	2020 World's Strongest Viking
2nd	2021 World's Strongest Viking
Europe's Strongest Man
9th	2022 Europe's Strongest Man
Strongman Champions League
1st	2017 SCL World Truck Pull Championships
7th	2018 SCL Abu Dhabi
5th	2018 SCL Holland
10th	2018 SCL Romania
9th	2019 SCL FIBO
2nd	2019 SCL Holland
3rd	2019 SCL Russia
3rd	2019 SCL Serbia
4th	2019 SCL World Record Breakers
1st	2019 SCL World Truck Pull Championships
1st	2019 SCL Curaçao
12th	2019 SCL World Finals
6th	2020 SCL Finland
2nd	2020 SCL World Record Breakers
3rd	2021 SCL Portugal
2nd	2021 SCL World Record Breakers
1st	2021 SCL World Truck Pull Championships
5th	2021 SCL Romania
1st	2021 SCL World Finals
3rd	2022 SCL World Record Breakers
1st	2022 SCL Holland
3rd	2022 SCL Serbia
13th	2022 SCL England
6th	2022 SCL Poland
1st	2022 SCL Romania
4th	2022 SCL Gibraltar
7th	2022 SCL World Finals
5th	2023 SCL Finland
3rd	2023 SCL Serbia
2nd	2023 SCL Holland
1st	2023 SCL World Truck Pull Championships
2nd	2024 SCL Martinique
7th	2024 SCL Serbia
9th	2024 SCL Holland
6th	2024 SCL Dubai
Strongest Man of the Netherlands
8th	2011
11th	2012
4th	2013
3rd	2014
7th	2015
5th	2016
3rd	2017
2nd	2018
1st	2019
1st	2021
1st	2022
1st	2023
2nd	2024
3rd	2025

Kelvin de Ruiter is a competitive strongman from the Netherlands and is a four-time Strongest Man of the Netherlands champion. Having competed in 43 International strongman competitions and winning 8 of them, de Ruiter is among the 50 most decorated strongmen of all time.

A carpenter by profession, he first noticed his talent for lifting heavy objects while working part time in a local breaker's yard. After training initially with his father, de Ruiter was mentored by former World’s Strongest Man bronze medalist Wout Zijlstra.

Having competed prolifically in the Strongman Champions League, de Ruiter is also known for his prowess in vehicle pulling, having won three World Truck Pull Championships.

== Personal records ==
- Deadlift – 400 kg (882 lb) (2025 Strongest Man of the Netherlands)
- Car Deadlift (15" from the floor) – 400 kg (882 lb) x 3 reps (2019 SCL World Record Breakers)
- Viking Deadlift (27" from the floor) – 670 kg (1,477 lb) (2020 SCL Germany) (World Record)
- Log press – 160 kg (353 lb) (2023 Strongest Man in the Netherlands)
- Arm over arm truck pull – 15,500 kg (34,172 lb) for 21.99 metres (72 ft 2 in) (2017 SCL World Truck Pull Championships) (World Record)
- Truck pull (harness only/ no rope) – 12,000 kg (26,455 lb) for 25 meter course in 21.25 seconds (2023 Strongman Champions League World Truck Pull Championships) (World Record)
- Truck pull (harness only/ no rope) – 15,000 kg (33,069 lb) for 25 meter course in 35.25 seconds (2019 Strongman Champions League World Truck Pull Championships) (World Record)
- Truck pull – 15,000 kg (33,069 lb) for 25 meter course in 31.50 seconds (2023 Strongman Champions League Holland) (World Record)
- Truck pull – 16,000 kg (35,274 lb) for 20 meter course in 26.70 seconds (2023 Strongest Man in the Netherlands) (World Record)
- Truck pull – 20,000 kg (44,092 lb) for 25 meters 'slight downhill' – 20.25 seconds (2023 Strongman Champions League World Truck Pull Championships) (World Record)
