= Berend Veneberg =

Dutch strength athlete

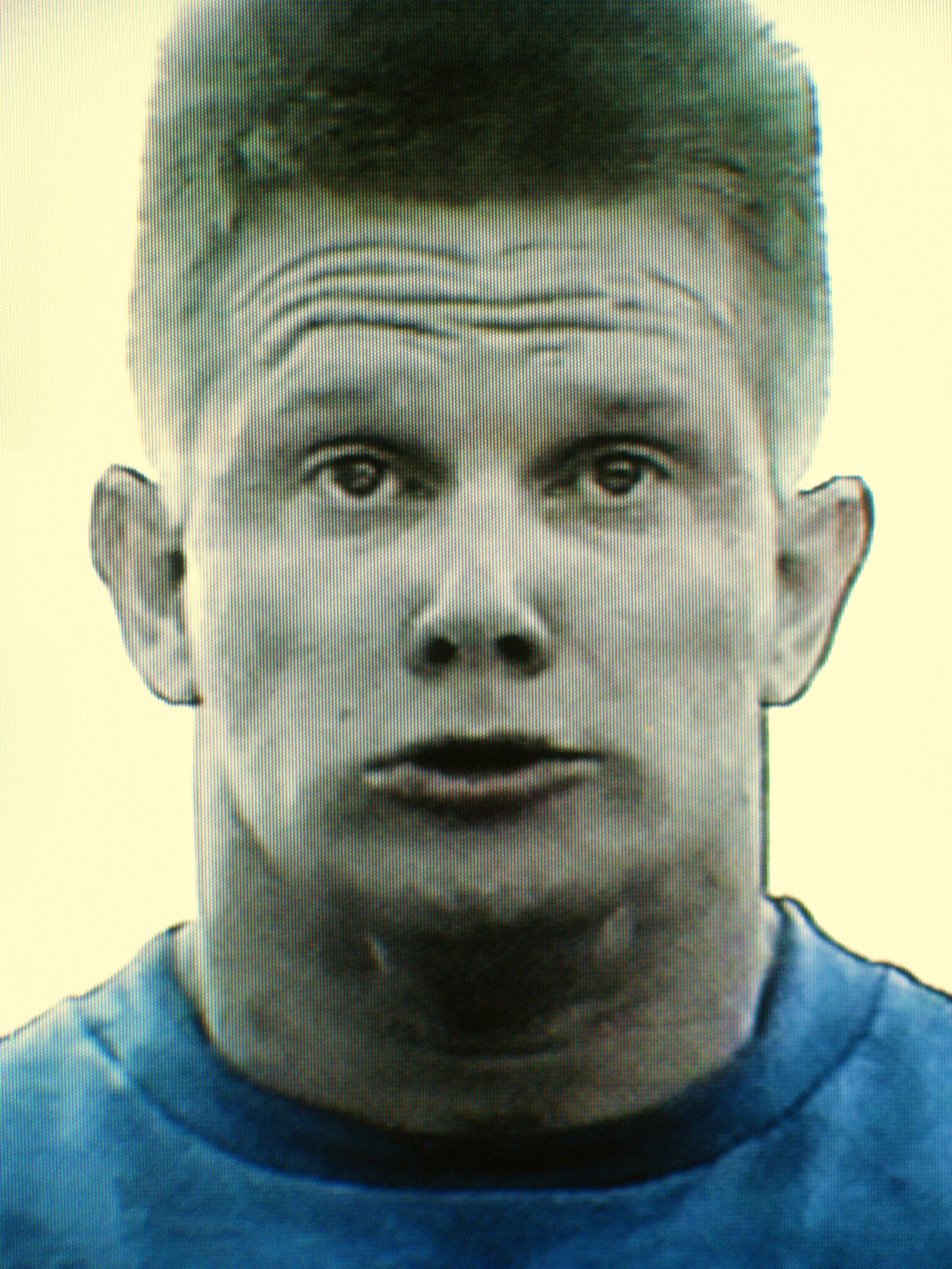

Personal information
- Born: 5 November 1963 (age 62) Den Ham, Overijssel, The Netherlands
- Occupation(s): Strongman, Powerlifting
- Height: 6 ft 1 in (1.85 m)
Medal record
Strongman
Representing Netherlands
World's Strongest Man
5th	1993 World's Strongest Man
Qualified	1995 World's Strongest Man
Qualified	1996 World's Strongest Man
Qualified	1997 World's Strongest Man
9th	1998 World's Strongest Man
6th	1999 World's Strongest Man
Europe's Strongest Man
7th	1996
3rd	1997
1st	2000
Strongest man of the Netherlands
3rd	1991
2nd	1992
1st	1993
2nd	1994
1st	1995
1st	1996
1st	1997
1st	1999
1st	2000
1st	2002
World's Strongest Team
5th	1997
1st	1998 wWout Zijlstra
4th	1999 w/Wout Zijlstra
3rd	2000 w/Wout Zijlstra
2nd	2002 w/Wout Zijlstra
Powerlifting
Representing Netherlands
IPF World Powerlifting Championships
3rd	1988	125kg
7th	1989	125kg
6th	1990	125kg
4th	1991	125kg
EPF European Powerlifting Championships
4th	1991	125kg

Berend Veneberg (born 5 November 1963 in Den Ham) is a former strongman and powerlifter from the Netherlands. He finished 5th at the World's Strongest Man games in 1993, 9th in 1998, 6th in 1999, 1st at Europe's Strongest Man in 2000 and won Strongest man of the Netherlands 7 times.

== Biography ==
Veneberg was born in Den Ham, Overijssel. He managed his first podium finish at the Strongest man of the Netherlands in 1991 where he finished third behind Ted van der Parre and Wout Zijlstra. The next year he placed second behind Ted van der Parre. In 1993 he would win the tournament for the first time a feat he would repeat six times. The same year he was invited for the first time at the World's Strongest Man in which he finished fifth. He competed several more times the following years and reached the final of the tournament on two more occasions. In 1998 he was injured in the final and finished ninth. In 1999 he competed for the last time and finished sixth. Veneberg competed together with Wout Zijlstra on several occasions in the World's Strongest Team competition and won the tournament in 1998. After this they reached the podium several more times but did not win again. In 2000 Veneberg won Europe's Strongest Man. Berend has won the Dutch National Powerlifting Championships 6 times. He also runs his own gym in the Netherlands, and has trained some top strongmen such as Jarno Hams. Berend competed on American Gladiators.

== Honours ==
- 1st place Strongest man of the Netherlands (1993)
- 5th place World's Strongest Man (1993)
- 1st place Strongest man of the Netherlands (1995)
- 1st place Strongest man of the Netherlands (1996)
- 1st place Strongest man of the Netherlands (1998)
- 9th place World's Strongest Man (1998)
- 1st place Strongest man of the Netherlands (1999)
- 6th place World's Strongest Man (1999)
- 1st place Strongest man of the Netherlands (2000)
- 1st place Europe's Strongest Man (2000)
- 1st place Strongest man of the Netherlands (2002)
- 1st place World's Strongest Team (1998)

== Personal records ==
- Keg toss – 12.5 kg (28 lb) over 7.10 metres (23 ft 4 in) (1999 IFSA Hungary Grand Prix) (former world record)
- Weight over bar – 25.5 kg (56 lb) over 5.40 metres (17 ft 9 in) (2000 Europe's Strongest Man)

Preceded by Ted van der Parre; Ted van der Parre; Wout Zijlstra	Strongest man of the Netherlands; 1993; 1995-2000; 2002	Succeeded by Ted van der Parre; Wout Zijlstra; Peter Baltus
