= Ted van der Parre =

Dutch strongman

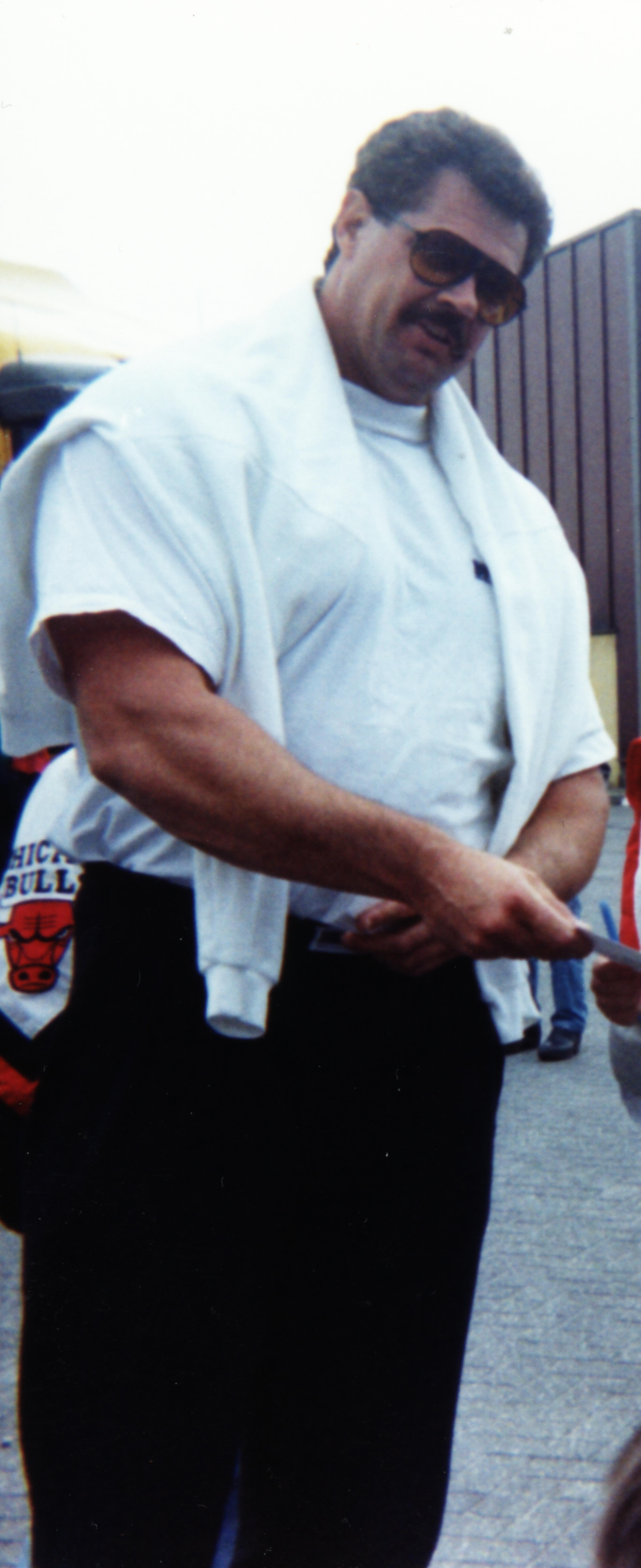
- Ted van der Parre in 1993

Personal information
- Born: 21 September 1955 (age 71) Vlaardingen, Netherlands
- Occupation: Strongman
- Height: 2.13 m (7 ft 0 in)
Medal record
Strongman
Representing Netherlands
World's Strongest Man
4th	1991
1st	1992
8th	1994
Pure Strength
3rd	1990 w/Tjalling van den Bosch
Strongest man of the Netherlands
2nd	1989
1st	1991
1st	1992
2nd	1993
1st	1994

Ted van der Parre (born 21 September 1955) is a former strongman from the Netherlands, who won the World's Strongest Man contest in 1992. He also participated in 1994 when he finished 8th, having to drop out after the second event due to a calf injury.

At 2.13 m (7 ft 0 in) and 160 kilograms (350 lb), Van der Parre is the tallest man ever to compete in the World's Strongest Man contest, and also had one of the lowest WSM BMI of 35.

He also won the Strongest Man of the Netherlands contest in 1991, 1992, and 1994.

== Honours ==
- 1st place Sterkste Man van Nederland (1991)
- 4th place World's Strongest Man (1991)
- 1st place Sterkste Man van Nederland (1992)
- 1st place World's Strongest Man (1992)
- 1st place Sterkste Man van Nederland (1994)
- 8th place World's Strongest Man (1994) (injured)

== Personal records ==
- Log press – 130 kg (287 lb) (1994 Strongest Man on Earth)
- Keg toss – 25 kg (55 lb) over 5.00 metres (16 ft 5 in) (1995 Manfred Hoeberl Classic) (former world record)
