= Bar bending =

Strongman event

Tuercebarras (Iron bar twister) by sculptor Jesús Lizaso, Bilbao

Bar bending or iron bending is a display of physical strength derived from early circus strongman performers, which was used in a sporting context in strength competitions such as the World's Strongest Man. It requires the strongmen to grip long iron rods from their edges, use their arm and grip strength, and bend until the two ends come closer to each other.

== Early influence to strongman competitions ==
From eighteenth century through the age of vaudeville strongmen of nineteenth century until around mid twentieth century, traditional strongmen like Thomas Topham, Louis 'Apollon' Uni, Warren Lincoln Travis, Hermann Görner, Joe 'Mighty Atom' Greenstein, Zishe Breitbart, Arthur Saxon, John B. Gagnon and Joe Rollino experimented with different techniques and variations on how to bend the iron in the most impressive ways.

When bar bending was featured at the inaugural World's Strongest Man competition in 1977, with Lou Ferrigno winning the event while Franco Columbu emerging second, it became a fan favourite event. Its popularity led bar bending to be continued for six more years until 1983. One of the most notorious moments of strongman occurred during 1981 World's Strongest Man competition when Bill Kazmaier and Geoff Capes injured themselves while attempting to bend the final iron bar of the event. Grip strength and bar bending specialists like Richard Sorin, John Brookfield, Greg Matonick, Reuben Hughes, David Horne, Tom Morris, David Wigren, Don Cummings, Shawn Kapusta, Austin Seitter and Dan Dring continued to experiment with more variations and along with strength advocates like Randall J. Strossen diversified the gamut of bar bending. In 2013, Hafþór Júlíus Björnsson established a new Guinness World Record by bending 4 × iron rods (each with a 5/8 inch (1.6 cm) diameter) in only 30 seconds and in 2022, Mikhail Shivlyakov established another Guinness World Record by bending 14 × iron rods (each with a 9/20 inch (1.2 cm) diameter) in only 45 seconds.
