= Holes in My Shoes =

Holes in My Shoes (The Jack Beers Story)
- Directed by: David Wachs
- Written by: David Wachs
- Produced by: David Wachs
- Starring: Jack Beers
- Music by: Jon Cohen
- Distributed by: TV - Sky Vision (formerly Parthenon) based in the UK / DVD & Online - USA/Canada- KinoLorber
- Release date: 2006
- Running time: 90 minutes
- Country: United States
- Language: English
- Budget: $250,000

Holes In My Shoes is a documentary feature film. It chronicles the life of Jack Beers, covering 94 years of his life from 1910 to 2004.

== Summary ==
Jack Beers (1910–2009) was known as "New York City's Strongest Boy". Beers eventually became "jack of all trades" - a strongman, a self-taught structural engineer, built Radio City Music Hall, indirectly shortened WW2 through an invention of his, put the spire on the Empire State Building, trained show boxers, and acted in over 200 films.

Beers grew up in extreme poverty on the Lower East Side of Manhattan, born in his parents' cold water apartment on East 6th Street. His parents were Jewish immigrants from Austria. He sold newspapers on the corner of Avenue B and 10th Street and played in Tompkins Square Park. Beers and his siblings took many jobs as kids to support the starving family. They had potatoes and potato soup every day. They gathered fallen coal from the coal truck to keep the house warm. He had 3 brothers: Manny, Julius and Hy, and one sister, Lilian.

Jack Beers at 17 and 74

Beers trained from a young boy in Tompkins Square Park. While working for a weight training company, he met one of its board members, Jack Dempsey. He went to Coney Island as a teenager and studied under Warren Lincoln Travis. At 17 he was performing shows in clubs and theaters, most famously at The Lambs Club near Times Square, performing to film stars of the time. He was on the cover of New York City newspapers and was labelled as "New York City's Strongest Boy".

After a fight in a pool hall over an antisemitic remark where his hand was broken, Beers decided to go into the ironwork trade at Fasslers Ironworks on the Lower East Side, near his house. His boss was the Buildings Commissioner of New York City at that time, Sam Fassler. Beers worked on many NYC's most famous buildings, notably the erection of Rockefeller Center and Radio City Music Hall, where he personally erected the famous marquee and stairs inside.

Beers taught himself to walk the steel beams at great heights. He went on to become a self-taught structural engineer, and became so accomplished that he was asked to be one of the general foreman on the Manhattan Project in Oak Ridge, Tennessee. He worked for Stone & Webster.

In 1950 Beers was responsible for erecting the famous radio tower spire on top of The Empire State Building, for General Sarnoff and RCA.

In the 1950s, because he couldn't have children with his wife, he put all his energy into training boxers and showed them at the Westminster Dog Shows throughout the 50s.

In the 1960s Beers continued in structural engineering work, participating in the erection of Lincoln Center.

Over his career he worked on NYU, City Hall, The Museum of Modern Art, every Con Edison building, Macy's, Gimbels, George Washington Bridge, The World's Fair, and many more.

In the 1960s Beers decided to audition for a role in George Segal's film Loving. He got the role, acted on the film for 12 days, and proceeded to have minor roles in over 200 films (including 7 Woody Allen films and 5 Arthur Hiller films). His biggest role was in a NYU film school short called "Rosey & Jonesy", directed by David Wachs (director of "Holes In My Shoes"), broadcast on PBS's American Playhouse (1984).

As Beers entered his 80s and 90s, he became a less active, but continued to drive, clean and cook for himself, ride a stationary bike up to 3 miles per day, do his own taxes, wash and iron his clothes, mow his 5 acres (20,000 m^{2}) of lawn with a tractor, cut down trees. The film "Holes In My Shoes" was made when he was 94. He made a music video of "When You're Smiling" when he was 97.

Jack Beers died just before his 99th birthday of natural causes.

Mayor Bloomberg has recognised him and he has had a day named after him in Oak Ridge, Tennessee.

== Production ==
Starring Jack Beers, New York City mayor Michael Bloomberg, Katherine Oliver (NYC Film Commissioner), Arthur Hiller (former Pres of Directors Guild of America), with film clips of Woody Allen and Meryl Streep. Shot in New York City, Greenwich, Connecticut and Oak Ridge, Tennessee.

== Post release ==
Winner of 4 Best Documentary Feature Film awards.

Aired on PBS WNET 13 (New York) prime time from 2010 to 2009. Distributed on DVD and Online in USA/Canada by KinoLorber. Distributed for TV worldwide by Sky Vision (formerly Parthenon) from the UK.

=== Broadcasts, Public Performances, Awards & Festivals ===
- PBS WNET (New York) - aired prime time numerous times - 2009–2011
- In-flight entertainment - British Airways, United Airlines, Thai Airways, Cathay Pacific - 2012
- Winner of Best Feature Documentary - Connecticut Film Festival
- Winner of Best Feature Documentary - Coney Island Film Festival
- Winner of Best Feature Documentary - Secret City Film Festival, Oak Ridge, Tennessee
- Cinequest Film Festival
- Avignon/New York Film Festival
- Declaration of Independence Film Festival (London)
