= Húsafell =

Human settlement in Iceland

Coordinates: 64.6973°N 20.8727°W

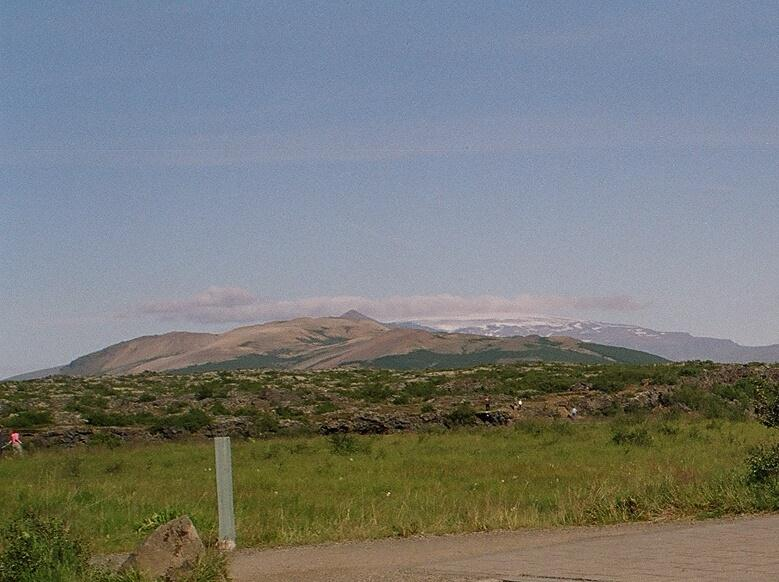
Mountain Tunga near Húsafell

Húsafell (Icelandic pronunciation: [ˈhuːsaˌfɛtl̥]) is a sprawling farm and church estate and the former site of a rectory. It is the innermost farm in Borgarfjörður in the west county of Iceland, not far from Reykholt and Reykholtsdalur. Húsafell farm now serves as a hub of service for various types of tourists visiting and residing in its surrounding area. The Húsafell surrounding area thus includes a wide array of second homes, tent sites, holiday housing and short term lodgings. Among its amenities are a swimming pool and a golf course. The wider Borgarfjörður region is also renowned for its multitude of lakes where there is trout to be had and salmon to be lured in the many rivers where it is possible to go fishing.

The actual estate of Húsafell farm stretches all the way to the roots of Eiríksjökull and Langjökull, covering all in all an area of appr. 100 square kilometers. The farm itself is situated in the midst of Hallmundarhraun, and the Húsafell birch wood of Húsafellsskógur. Due to its sunny and warm summer climate and natural calmness of its surrounding stretch of lava, Húsafell and its surrounding area played host to Iceland's most popular outdoor music festivals during the 1960s and the 1970s.

In the near vicinity of Húsafell are the natural attractions of Barnafoss and Hraunfossar waterfalls as well as the caves of Víðgelmir and Surtshellir. There are also many hiking trails to be experienced in the area, as well as the more organized tours on offer to see the glaciers Eiríksjökull or Langjökull, and excursions across the Arnarvatnsheiði highland or all the south across the Kaldidalur highland.

In the olden days, back when the main route from the northern part of Iceland to the south lay across Arnarvatnsheiði, Húsafell would find itself to be an oasis of food and lodgings for weary travellers making their way across this country highway. Húsafell was indeed a popular stopover for many overnight visitors in the not so distant past, and lately, the idea of laying a country highway from Húsafell and across Stórisandur up to the North Country has resurfaced, albeit with today's motorized vehicles in mind.

Natural features in the area include the Hraunfossar, where water comes out from a lava field over a length of about 1 km. They are placed in a setting of birch wood. The trees here grow up to 4 m. The caves of another lava field, Hallmundarhraun are also not too far away (e.g. the Surtshellir cave).

In the 19th century, there was a colony of artists living at Húsafell. One of these was the Icelandic painter Jóhannes S. Kjarval. Today, the sculptor Páll Guðmundsson, a descendant of the Húsafell, lives and works at creating interesting faces which he cuts out of local stone. The Húsafell Stone, a rock stored in a sheep pen built by pastor Snorri Björnsson, is a legendary lifting stone which has been used in international competitions.

== See also ==
- Waterfalls of Iceland
