= Jack Shanks =

Traditional Strongman

Personal information
- Born: 1936 (age 89–90) Belfast, Northern Ireland
- Occupation: Strongman
- Height: 5 ft 10 in (1.78 m)
- Weight: 73 kg (161 lb)

Jack Shanks (born 1936) is a former strongman from Belfast, Northern Ireland. He is best known for natural stone lifting.

== Dinnie Stones ==
Shanks is the first man to lift the Scottish Dinnie Stones of Aberdeenshire, unassisted after Donald Dinnie did so in 1860. He achieved this feat (which is also known as putting the wind under the stones) five times in the summer of 1972.

On 3 June 1973, Shanks also became the first man after 113 years to replicate Donald Dinnie's historical feat of walking the stones over the landmark distance of 17 ft 1 1/2 in (5.22 m) across the width of the Potarch bridge. A large group of spectators and press were gathered to witness the event. The feat was performed on the top of a flatbed lorry for the crowd to have a better viewing experience. Strength historian and sports promoter David P. Webster gifted Shanks a prize of £250 for the achievement.

The leather lifting belt and tank top Shanks wore during the feats are now in display at the H.J. Lutcher Stark Center for Physical Culture and Sports.

== See also ==
- Lifting stone
- Dinnie Stones
- Húsafell Stone
