= Annika Eilmann =

Finnish strength athlete

- Other name: Annika Karhu
- Occupation: Strongwoman
- Known for: The first woman in history to lift and hold the Dinnie Stones.
- Height: 1.70 m (5 ft 7 in)

Annika Karhu née Eilmann is a Strongwoman and grip athlete from Naantali, Finland. She is renowned as the first woman in history to lift and hold the Dinnie Stones, a pair of Scottish lifting stones located in Potarch, Aberdeenshire.

Annika achieved this feat on 10 June 2019 at a bodyweight of 82 kg (181 lb). The historical stones are composed of granite, with iron rings affixed to them, and have a combined weight of 332.5 kg (733 lb), with the larger stone weighing 188 kg (414 lb) and the smaller stone weighing 144.5 kg (319 lb). She managed to lift the two stones unassisted (without using lifting straps) and held it for 10.31 seconds, for a world record which is unbeaten to-date.

She has also participated in numerous strongwoman competitions including World's Strongest Woman (under 82 kg), OSG Masters, and is also a multiple champion of the Finland's Strongest Woman title.

== Personal records ==
- Dinnie Stones unassisted lift and hold - 332.5 kg (733 lb) stones for 10.31 seconds (World Record)
- One handed Horne handle Deadlift - 203.5 kg (449 lb) (World Record)
- Deadlift - 210 kg (463 lb)
- Axle bar Deadlift - 172 kg (379 lb)
- Squat - 130 kg (287 lb)
- Log press - 80.5 kg (177 lb)
- Axle press - 80 kg (176 lb)
- Block press - 63 kg (139 lb)
- Circle Dumbbell press - 46.5 kg (103 lb)
- Atlas Stone loading (No Tacky) - 147 kg (324 lb) on to a 100 cm platform
- Atlas Stone to shoulder - 105 kg (231 lb)
- Húsafell Stone carry (replica shield) - 152.8 kg (337 lb) for 15 m
- Super Yoke - 320 kg (705 lb) for 10 m
