= Sven-Ole Thorsen =

Danish stunt performer

- Born: 24 September 1944 (age 82); Copenhagen, German-occupied Denmark
- Occupations: Actor, bodybuilder, stuntman, strongman
- Years active: 1977–2011
- Height: 193 cm (6 ft 4 in)
- Spouses: Anniqa (m. 1982; div. 1991); Birgitta Sunding Thorsen (m. 2013)
- Children: 5

Competition record

Strongman

Representing Denmark

Denmark's Strongest Man
1st	1983

Europe's Strongest Man
10th	1982

Sven-Ole Thorsen (born 24 September 1944) is a Danish former actor, stuntman, bodybuilder and strongman competitor. Thorsen won Denmark's Strongest Man in 1983.

Using his stature he often plays imposing giants and villains in his films who are somehow beaten by smaller opponents in a David and Goliath manner, but he has also played heroic characters such as Gunnar the legendary warrior in The Viking Sagas. His autobiography Stærk mand i Hollywood (Strong Man in Hollywood) was published on 26 October 2007, and was very well reviewed. The first printing of the book reportedly sold out in 24 hours.

== Career ==
He is known for his frequent appearances in movies featuring close friend Arnold Schwarzenegger, like Conan the Barbarian, as the hammer-wielding Thorgrim; The Running Man, as the ultimately-sympathetic bodyguard Sven; and in Predator as a Soviet advisor that executes a hostage. His other characters have included the boater-wearing security guard La Fours in Mallrats, the fighter Tigris of Gaul in Gladiator, Lt. Michael "Tank" Ellis in Captain Power, and the alien villain Secundus in Abraxas, Guardian of the Universe.

Thorsen has been credited in fifteen Arnold Schwarzenegger movies (as of 2006) (twelve as actor, three as stuntman or trainer), making him Schwarzenegger's most frequent collaborator. It began with Conan the Barbarian, when Schwarzenegger brought Thorsen and other of his bodybuilder friends (like Franco Columbu) with him to shoot the movie. Later, when Thorsen moved to the United States, he met Schwarzenegger again while he was acting in the movie Commando. Thorsen helped with some of the stuntwork in that movie, and quickly found work in many of the subsequent Schwarzenegger films.

In spite of Thorsen's thick Danish accent, his voice is almost never dubbed (an exception being Hard Target). Thorsen pursued his role as Tigris (of Gaul) in Gladiator for over a year, beating Lou Ferrigno for the part. The part won him two TAURUS World Stunt Awards in the ceremony's inaugural year. Thorsen has founded various federations, including The Danish Bodybuilding Federation in 1979 and Cigar Night at Schatzi in Santa Monica, California along with Schwarzenegger. He has a black belt in Shotokan karate and holds championship titles.

== Personal life ==
Thorsen is 193 centimetres (6 ft 4 in) tall and while appearing in Conan the Barbarian (1982) he weighed 138 kilograms (304 lb).

Thorsen lives in Santa Monica, California and had two dogs, a Jack Russell Terrier named Jake and an American Bull Terrier named Cleo (now deceased). He won the Danish "Show of Winners" Award of the Year 2006, honouring people who have a special affiliation with dogs.

== Filmography ==
=== Film ===
Year	Film	Role	Notes
1977	Pas på ryggen, professor (Mind Your Back, Professor)	Russisk Håndlanger (Russian Henchman)	
1982	Conan the Barbarian	Thorgrim	(as Sven Ole Thorsen)^{[1]}
1984	Conan the Destroyer	Togra	(as Sven Ole Thorsen)^{[1]}
1985	Red Sonja	Stuntman	Stunts (uncredited)^{[1]}
1986	Raw Deal a.k.a. Triple Identity	Patrovita's Bearded Bodyguard (uncredited)	Stunts^{[1]}
1987	Lethal Weapon	Mercenary	(as Sven Thorsen)
1987	Predator	Russian Officer (uncredited)	^{[1]}
1987	The Running Man	Sven	(as Sven Thorsen)^{[1]}
1987	Overboard	Olaf, Stayton Flunky (uncredited)	
1988	Red Heat	Nikolai, Georgian Mafia	^{[1]}
1988	Twins	Sam Klane	^{[1]}
1989	Pink Cadillac	Birthright Thug	
1989	Ghostbusters II	Stuntman	Stunts
1990	The Hunt for Red October	Russian Chief of The Red October	
1990	Total Recall	Trainer	Trainer^{[1]}
1991	Abraxas, Guardian of the Universe	Secundus	(as Sven Ole-Thorsen)
1991	Harley Davidson and the Marlboro Man	David	
1991	Terminator 2: Judgment Day	Galleria Security Guard	^{[1]}
1992	Death Becomes Her	Stuntman	Stunts (uncredited)
1992	Dead On: Relentless II a.k.a. Relentless II: Dead On	Patrick Vergano, Mechanic	Stunts
1992	Lethal Weapon 3	Henchman #2	
1992	Bram Stoker's Dracula	Stuntman	Stunts (as Sven Thorsen)
1992	Nemesis	Cyborg Interrogating Old Woman (uncredited)	Stunts
1993	Cyborg 2	Doorman	(as Sven Thorsen)
1993	Nowhere to Run	Prisoner	
1993	Dragon: The Bruce Lee Story	The Demon	
1993	Last Action Hero	Gunman	^{[1]}
1993	Hard Target	Stephan	
1994	A Little Tailor's Christmas Story	Schultz	
1994	The Dangerous	Sven	
1994	On Deadly Ground	Otto	(as Swen-Ole Thorsen)
1994	A Low Down Dirty Shame a.k.a. Mister Cool	Mob Boss' Bodyguard (uncredited)	Stunts (as Sven Thorsen)
1995	The Viking Sagas a.k.a. The Icelandic Sagas	Gunnar	
1995	No Exit a.k.a. Fatal Combat	Darcona	
1995	The Quick and the Dead	"Swede" Gutzon	
1995	Mallrats	La Fours	Stunts (as Sven Thorsen)
1995	Heat	Stuntman	Stunts (uncredited)
1996	The Undercover Kid a.k.a. How I Saved the President	Terrorist #1	
1996	Fox Hunt	Huge Man	
1996	Eraser	Russian Gunman (uncredited)	Stunts^{[1]}
1996	Bulletproof	Gunman At Motel (uncredited)	Stunts^{[1]}
1996	Jingle All the Way	Stuntman	Stunts (as Sven Thorsen)^{[1]}
1997	Breakdown	Stuntman	Stunts Only
1997	Back in Business a.k.a. Heart of Stone	Stuntman	Stunts Only
1997	Batman & Robin	Stuntman	Stunts Only
1997	George of the Jungle	Mercenary	(as Sven-Ole-Thorsen)
1997	Kull the Conqueror	King Borna	
1998	The Bad Pack	Sven	
1998	Best of the Best 4: Without Warning	Boris	
1998	Soldier	Stuntman	Stunts Only
1998	Winchell	German Man	
1999	Foolish	Paris	
1999	The 13th Warrior	Would-Be King	
1999	End of Days	Thug (uncredited)	also Utility Stunts^{[1]}
2000	Ready to Rumble	Stuntman	Stunts Only
2000	Façade a.k.a. Death Valley	General Schweinkopf	(as Sven Ole-Thorsen)
2000	Gladiator	Tigris of Gaul (Tiger)	Won Stunt Award
2000	The Alternate a.k.a. Agent of Death	Secret Service Agent (uncredited)	
2001	The Gristle	Butcher Boy	
2001	Bandits	Oregon State Prison Guard On Watchtower (uncredited)	
2001	Route 666	Sergei, Russian Hitman	
2001	Extreme Honor a.k.a. Last Line of Defence 2	Baker's Bodyguard	
2002	Hollywood Next 8 Exits	The Landlord	
2002	Collateral Damage	Bomb Victim (uncredited)	^{[1]}
2002	The Sum of All Fears	Haft	
2003	Masked and Anonymous	Stuntman	Stunts (as Sven Thorsen)
2003	Charlie's Angels: Full Throttle	Machine Gun Mongol (uncredited)	
2003	The Rundown a.k.a. Welcome to the Jungle	Goon (uncredited)	^{[1]}
2003	Timecop 2: The Berlin Decision	SS Bodyguard	(as Sven Ole Thorson)
2004	In Enemy Hands a.k.a. U-Boat	U-429: Hans	
2004	Dodgeball: A True Underdog Story	Lumberjack Hit By Ball (uncredited)	Stunts (uncredited)
2004	Collateral	Stuntman	Stunt Driver Only
2004	Hidalgo	The Laughing Raider (uncredited)	
2005	Hostage	Hooded Thug Guarding Hostages (uncredited)	
2011	Ronal Barbaren (Ronald the Barbarian)	The General (voice only)	Animated feature

Notes

1 Arnold Schwarzenegger also appeared in this movie.

=== Television ===
Year	Title	Role	Notes
17 October 1986	The A-Team	Rolf	"Quarterback Sneak" (episode # 5.4)
1987	Captain Power and the Soldiers of the Future	Lieutenant Michael 'Tank' Ellis	Entire series
11 May 1991	The Flash	Cyborg Omega	"Alpha" (episode # 1.19)
13 May 1996	Nowhere Man	Phone Repairman/Assassin	"Marathon" (episode # 1.24)
8 February 1997	Baywatch Nights	Viking	"Frozen Out of Time" (episode # 2.13)
18 March 1997	The Guardian	Baiya	"Pilot" (episode # 1.1)
1 February 1998	Mike Hammer, Private Eye	Rolf (as Sven Ole Thorsen)	"The Art of Murder" (episode # 2.3)
21 September 1998	Baywatch	Hans Ulpan	"Crash: Part 1" (episode # 9.1)
28 September 1998	Baywatch	Hans Ulpan	"Crash: Part 2" (episode # 9.2)
1999	Biker-Jens i USA	as himself	episode "Hos Sven-Ole Thorsen"
1 December 2000	Helle for Høgsbro	as himself	"Dovenskab" (episode # 1.13)
27 December 2005	Go'morgen Danmark	as himself	
3 February 2006	Showtime	as Himself	Episode #2.1
17 February 2006	2 Kaffe, Tak	as himself	
6 February 2006	Go' Aften Danmark	as himself	
15 March 2007	Andy Barker, P.I.	Thug #1	Pilot (episode # 1.1)
October 2009	Vild med dans (Strictly Come Dancing)	first two programs as himself	
14 December 2009	Kristian	as Sven Ole	"Sekten" (episode # 1.5)
13 December 2010	Go' Aften Danmark	as himself	
