= René Minkwitz =

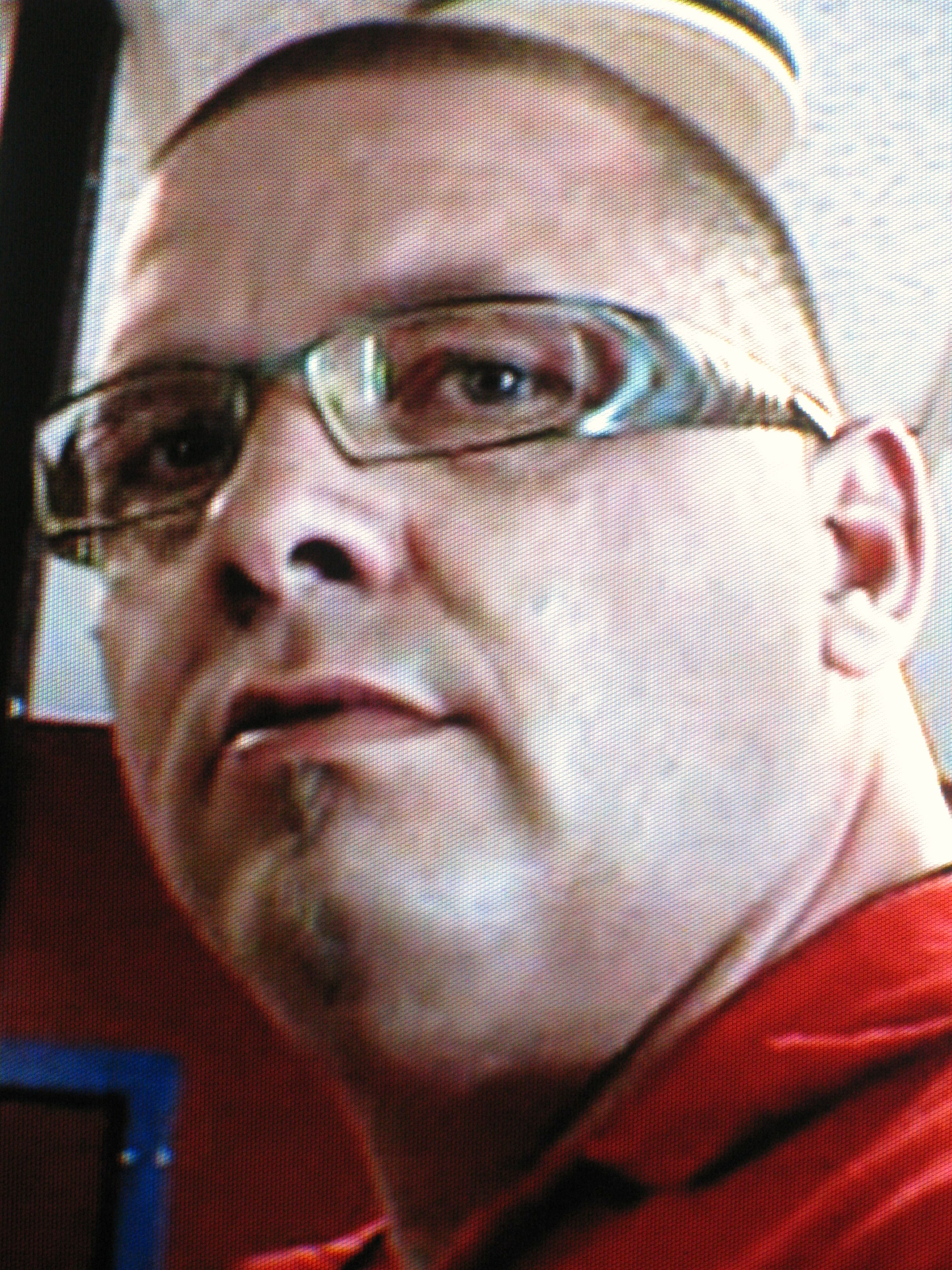

Personal information
- Born: 7 February 1970 (age 56) Denmark
- Occupation: Strongman
- Height: 6 ft 4 in (1.93 m)
Medal record
Strongman
Representing Denmark
World's Strongest Man
10th	1999 World's Strongest Man
Qualified	2000 World's Strongest Man
Qualified	2002 World's Strongest Man
Qualified	2003 World's Strongest Man
Qualified	2004 World's Strongest Man
IFSA
3rd	2005 Holland Grand Prix
4th	2005 IFSA Nordic Championships
1st	2005 Denmark Grand Prix
Denmark's Strongest Man
2nd	1998
1st	2000
1st	2001
1st	2004
1st	2005
1st	2006
Ultimate Strongman Masters
2nd	2011 Ultimate Strongman Masters World Championship

René Kurland Minkwitz (born 7 February 1970) is a former Strongman athlete from Denmark. He won Denmark's Strongest Man title 5 times in, 2000, 2001, 2004, 2005 and 2006. He finished 10th at the World's Strongest Man final of 1999. He further took part in the competition in ensuing years but couldn't qualify for the finals.

== Personal records ==
- Power stairs (4 x 190–270 kg (419–595 lb) duck walks / total of 20 steps) – 50.61 seconds (2004 IFSA Lithuania Grand Prix, Cekol Cup) (World Record)

== Honours ==
- 5 times Denmark Strongest Man (2000 - 01; 2004 - 06);
- 10th place 1999 World's Strongest Man (injured);
- Qualifying heat World's Strongest Man (2000; 2002 - 04);
- 2nd place at 2011 Ultimate Strongman Masters World Championship in Belfast, Northern Ireland.
