= Dinnie Stones =

Pair of lifting stones

Coordinates: 57°3′54″N 2°39′4″W

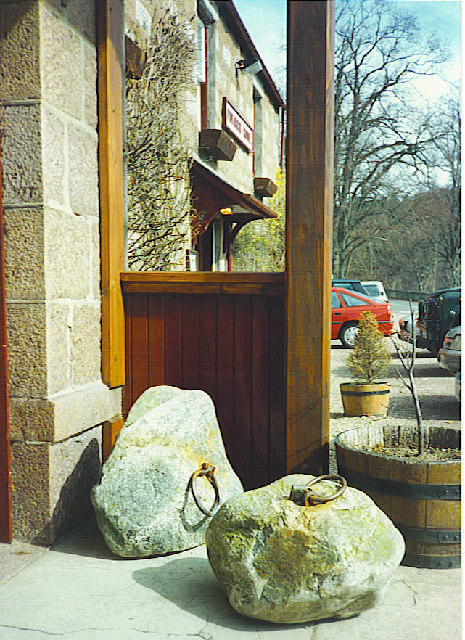
The Dinnie Stones in 1995

The Dinnie Stones (also called Stanes or Steens) are a pair of Scottish lifting stones located in Potarch, Aberdeenshire. They were made famous by strongman Donald Dinnie, who reportedly carried the stones barehanded across the width of the Potarch Bridge, a distance of 17 ft 1 1/2 in (5.22 m), in 1860. They remain in use as lifting stones.

The stones are composed of granite, with iron rings affixed. They have a combined weight of 733 lb (332 1/2 kg), with the larger stone weighing 414.5 lb (188 kg) and the smaller stone weighing 318.5 lb (144 1/2 kg).

The stones were reportedly selected in the 1830s as counterweights for use in maintaining the Potarch Bridge. They were lost following World War I, but were rediscovered in 1953 by David P. Webster.

== Replicas ==
Replicas of the Dinnie Stones (pioneered by Gordon Dinnie) have been used in international competitions most notably during the Rogue record breakers event of the Arnold Strongman Classic.

While the replica Dinnie Stones are very close in weight (with the replicas being 1lb heavier), there are several differences between the sets of stones. The replica stones have slightly different handles, the sets of stones are different shapes, and the replicas sit one inch higher than the original stones. The rules for the walk also differ, with lifters being allowed one 10 second drop while walking with the replica stones.

== World records ==
=== Carrying ===
Original method: The ultimate challenge is to replicate the 1860 performance of Donald Dinnie, by walking the original stones (heavier stone to be gripped from the front and the smaller stone from the back) over the historical Potarch Bridge distance of 17 ft 1 1/2 in (5.22 m). Only 6 other men have ever been recorded as matching this feat (unassisted without using any weightlifting straps). The first to replicate it was Donald Dinnie's father Robert Dinnie. However, some sources state it was in fact Robert who did it first. The feat then went unrepeated for 113 years, until Northern Irishman Jack Shanks did so on 3 June 1973. The feat was followed by Mark Haydock (2012), Mark Felix (2014), Brian Irwin (2017) and Pete Seddon (2019).

Farmer's walk method: Another feat of strength is to pick up the stones from the sides and walk them in a farmer's walk style carry until dropping them. Picking up of the stones this way is more challenging than the original method because it makes the range of motion of the lift longer and takes the wider sumo stance out of the equation. This record, with the original stones, is held by Laurence Shahlaei, who carried them a distance of 22 ft 4 in (6.81 m) in 2023. Mitchell Hooper holds the record for the longest distance walked with the Rogue replica Dinnie Stones, carrying them a distance of 41 ft 4 in (12.6 m) in 2024.

=== Holding ===
The record for lifting and holding the stones up unassisted (which is regarded as a world class feat of grip strength) for the longest time is 46.30 seconds, set on 18 May 2019 by Mark Haydock of England. This record was first introduced at the Aboyne Highland Games in 2016, and the first holder of the record was James Gardner. Annika Eilmann of Finland holds the women's record in this with a time of 10.31 seconds, also set in 2019. Kevin Faires holds the record with the Rogue replica Dinnie Stones with 41.31 seconds while Gabi Dixon holds the women's record with 6.86 seconds, both achieved during 2023 Rogue Record Breakers.

=== Lifting ===
As of 1 July 2026, 427 individuals have managed to lift the original stones off the ground (also known as putting the wind under the stones, i.e. just lifting/ not walking with them). (Note: According to www.thedinniestones.com and www.liftingstones.org, 368 individuals (363 men and 5 women) have managed to lift the original stones off the ground unassisted while another 38 (29 men and 9 women) have managed to do the same assisted with straps.) David Prowse was the first to do so assisted (with straps) in October 1963 followed by Charlie McLaggan, Ken Morrison and Bill Bangert (1971). Jack Shanks was the first to lift them unassisted (raw grip without straps) in 1972, followed by Syd Strachan, Jim Splaine, Imlach Shearer (1973) and Jim Fraser (1978). Twenty-two women have also managed to lift the stones. The first was Jan Todd in 1979, a feat which was not matched by any woman for the next 39 years until Leigh Holland-Keen in 2018 (both assisted with straps). Sally Brierley lifted the stones on 4 November 2025 at 81kg In January 2019, Emmajane Smith lifted the stones without straps, making her the first woman to do so. In June 2019, Annika Eilmann lifted the stones without straps and also held them, making her the first woman to do so. In October 2019, Chloe Brennan at a bodyweight of 64 kg (141 lb) lifted the stones (unassisted partial lift) and became the lightest lifter to put the wind beneath the stones.

Most number of lifts: Jim Splaine became the first person to lift the Dinnie Stones more than 50 times, a feat he went on to achieve a total of 67 times from 1973 to 1990. Most of his early lifts were done at a bodyweight of 65 kg (143 lb) and with his son sitting on his shoulders. Brett Nicol is the record holder for lifting the Dinnie Stones for the most number of times, with over 600 lifts from 2008 to date. In 2012 Mark Haydock set a record by lifting the stones 25 times in a single day, including 10 times within 1 minute.

== See also ==
- History of physical training and fitness
- Húsafell Stone
