= Hvítá =

There are several rivers in Iceland named Hvítá (= engl. White river).

The most important ones are:

- Hvítá (Árnessýsla) in the south of Iceland

and

- Hvítá (Borgarfjörður) in the west of the country (Vesturland) with the waterfalls Barnafoss and Hraunfossar.
