= Denmark's Strongest Man =

Annual strongman competition in Denmark

Tournament information
- Location: Denmark
- Established: 1983
- Format: Multi-event competition

Current champion
- (Denmark) Emil Eriksen (2026)

Denmark's Strongest Man is an annual Strongman contest held in various locations in Denmark, and features exclusively Danish strength athletes. The contest was first held in 1983 with Sven-Ole Thorsen winning the title. Flemming Rasmussen holds the record with 7 wins, while Henrik Henning and Mikkel Leicht share 6 wins each. René Minkwitz and Nikolai Hansen share 5 wins each. Emil Eriksen is the current champion.

== Champions breakdown ==
The competition has been held 40 times and has produced 14 champions throughout the years. It is one of the oldest strongman competitions in the world.

Year	Champion	Runner-up	3rd place
1983	(Denmark) Sven-Ole Thorsen	(To be confirmed)	(To be confirmed)
1984	(Denmark) Henrik Henning	(To be confirmed)	(To be confirmed)
1985–1986	Event not held		
1987	(Denmark) Henrik Henning	(To be confirmed)	(To be confirmed)
1988	(Denmark) Henrik Henning	(To be confirmed)	(To be confirmed)
1989	(Denmark) Henrik Henning	(To be confirmed)	(To be confirmed)
1990	Event not held		
1991	(Denmark) Henning Thorsen	(Denmark) Henrik Ravn	(To be confirmed)
1992	(Denmark) Henning Thorsen	(Denmark) Henrik Ravn	(To be confirmed)
1993	(Denmark) Henrik Henning	(Denmark) Henning Thorsen	(Denmark) Bo Mortensen
1994	(Denmark) Henrik Henning	(Denmark) Bo Mortensen	(Denmark) Flemming Rasmussen
1995	(Denmark) Flemming Rasmussen	(To be confirmed)	(Denmark) Bo Mortensen
1996	(Denmark) Flemming Rasmussen	(Bo Mortensen)	(To be confirmed)
1997	(Denmark) Flemming Rasmussen	(Denmark) Bo Mortensen	(Denmark) René Minkwitz
1998	(Denmark) Flemming Rasmussen	(Denmark) René Minkwitz	(Denmark) Torben Sørensen
1999	(Denmark) Flemming Rasmussen	(To be confirmed)	(To be confirmed)
2000	(Denmark) Flemming Rasmussen	(To be confirmed)	(To be confirmed)
2000	(Denmark) René Minkwitz	(To be confirmed)	(To be confirmed)
2001	(Denmark) René Minkwitz	(To be confirmed)	(To be confirmed)
2002	(Denmark) Torben Andersen	(To be confirmed)	(To be confirmed)
2003	(Denmark) Flemming Rasmussen	(To be confirmed)	(To be confirmed)
2004	(Denmark) René Minkwitz	(Denmark) Flemming Bruntse	(Denmark) Torben Sørensen
2005	(Denmark) René Minkwitz	(Denmark) Torben Sørensen	(Denmark) Flemming Jensen
2006	(Denmark) René Minkwitz	(Denmark) Gamle Flemming	(Denmark) Nikolai Hansen
2007	Event not held		
2008	(Denmark) Jasmin Hajdarevic	(Denmark) Gregor Stenmar	(Denmark) Nikolai Hansen
2009	(Denmark) Nikolai Hansen	(To be confirmed)	(To be confirmed)
2010	(Denmark) Nicolai Hansen (Denmark) Asbjørn Ettrup	(Denmark) Mikkel Leicht	(Denmark) Kim Haagen
2011	(Denmark) Nikolai Hansen	(Denmark) Mikkel Leicht	(Denmark) Asbjørn Ettrup
2012	(Denmark) Nikolai Hansen	(Denmark) Mikkel Leicht	(Denmark) Thomas Kær
2013	(Denmark) Nikolai Hansen	(Denmark) Mikkel Leicht	(Denmark) Mads Rathmann Erenskjold
2014	(Denmark) Mikkel Leicht	(Denmark) Nikolai Hansen	(Denmark) Mads Rathmann Erenskjold
2015	(Denmark) Mikkel Leicht	(To be confirmed)	(To be confirmed)
2016	(Denmark) Mikkel Leicht	(To be confirmed)	(To be confirmed)
2017	(Denmark) Mikkel Leicht	(To be confirmed)	(To be confirmed)
2018	(Denmark) Mikkel Leicht	(To be confirmed)	(To be confirmed)
2019	(Denmark) Mikkel Leicht	(To be confirmed)	(To be confirmed)
2021	(Denmark) Emil Jensen	(Denmark) Erik Thomsen	(Denmark) Mikkel Leicht
2022	(Denmark) Anders Aslak	(Denmark) Oliver Storgaard	(Denmark) Magnus Berg
2023	(Denmark) Anders Aslak	(Denmark) Frederik Nordberg	(Denmark) Mads Schmidt
2024	(Denmark) Anders Aslak	(Denmark) Frederik Nordberg	(Denmark) Erik Thomsen
2025	(Denmark) Anders Aslak	(Denmark) Mark Møller Madsen	(Denmark) Emil Eriksen
2026	(Denmark) Emil Eriksen	(Denmark) Mark Møller Madsen	(Denmark) Anders Aslak

=== Repeat champions ===
Champion	Times & years
(Denmark) Flemming Rasmussen	7 (1995, 1996, 1997, 1998, 1999, 2000, 2003)
(Denmark) Henrik Henning	6 (1984, 1987, 1988, 1989, 1993, 1994)
(Denmark) Mikkel Leicht	6 (2014, 2015, 2016, 2017, 2018, 2019)
(Denmark) René Minkwitz	5 (2000, 2001, 2004, 2005, 2006)
(Denmark) Nikolai Hansen	5 (2009, 2010, 2011, 2012, 2013)
(Denmark) Anders Aslak	4 (2022, 2023, 2024, 2025)
(Denmark) Henning Thorsen	2 (1991, 1992)

== Regional Competitions ==
=== Nordic Strongman Championships ===
Nordic Strongman Championships consists of athletes from Iceland, Norway, Sweden, Finland and Denmark.

Year	Champion	Runner-Up	3rd Place
2005	(Norway) Svend Karlsen	(Sweden) Magnus Samuelsson	(Finland) Juha-Matti Räsänen
2012	(Sweden) Johannes Årsjö	(Norway) Lars Rorbakken	(Denmark) Mikkel Leicht
2013	(Sweden) Johannes Årsjö	(Norway) Ole Martin Hansen	(Finland) Juha-Matti Järvi

- In 2005, the competition was held under IFSA in Kristiansand, and in 2012 and 2013 in Harstad, Norway under Giants Live.
- From 2014 onwards, the competition was promoted to global level, re-titled as the World's Strongest Viking and was held consecutively for 8 years under Strongman Champions League.
