= Henning Thorsen =

Strongman and powerlifter

Personal information
- Born: October 20, 1959 (age 66) Denmark
- Occupation: Strongman
- Height: 6 ft 4 in (1.93 m)
Medal record
Strongman
Representing Denmark
World's Strongest Man
4th	1990
2nd	1991
6th	1992
Europe's Strongest Man
1st	1990
Denmark's Strongest Man
1st	1984
1st	1987
1st	1988
1st	1989
1st	1991
1st	1992
Denmark's Strongest Viking
1st	1990

Henning Thorsen (born October 20, 1959) is a former strongman and powerlifter from Denmark. He won the Danish superheavyweight powerlifting championships 5 times and Denmark's Strongest Man six times from 1984, 1987 to 1989, 1991 and 1992. Thorsen participated in the World's Strongest Man finals of 1990, 1991 and 1992. His best result was second place to Magnús Ver Magnússon in 1991. Thorsen won Europe's Strongest Man in 1990.

== Honours ==
- 6 times winner of Denmark's Strongest Man (1984, 1987–1989, 1991 and 1992)
- 1st place Europe's Strongest Man (1990)
- 4th place World's Strongest Man (1990)
- 2nd place World's Strongest Man (1991)
- 6th place World's Strongest Man (1992)
