= Paul Trappen =

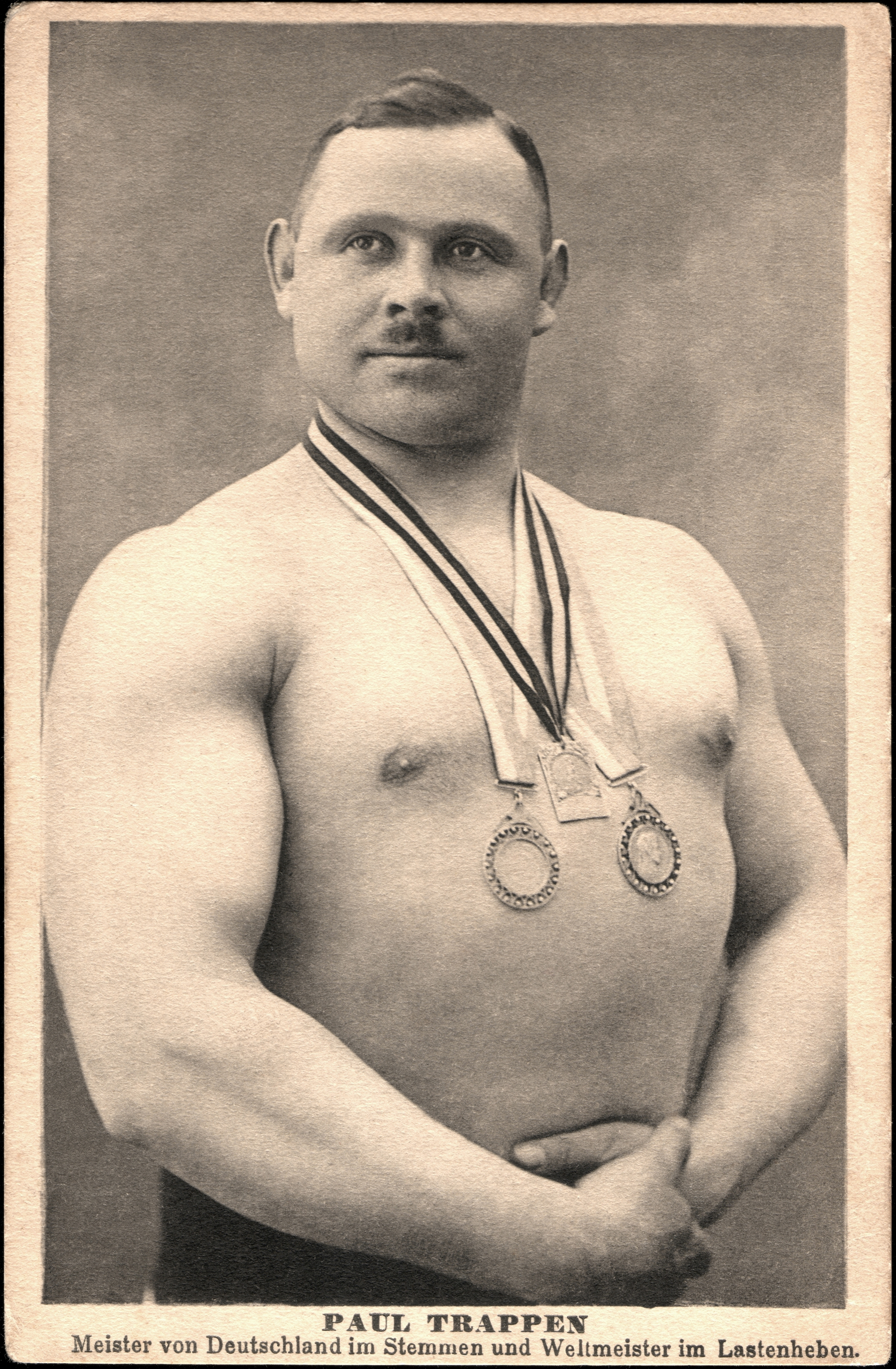

Personal information
- Citizenship: Germany
- Born: 1887 Heidweller, Germany
- Died: 22 February 1957 (aged 69–70) Trier, Germany
- Occupation(s): wrestler, weightlifter, strongman
- Spouse: Susanna Dier (m. 1911)

Paul Trappen (1887 – 22 February 1957) was a German wrestler and weightlifter who gained a reputation as the world's strongest man circa 1915.

== Life ==
Paul Trappen was born in 1887 to Ackerers Christian Trappen and his wife Maria Katharina Görgen. As an apprentice butcher, he moved to Trier, where he lived until his death. In 1911, Trappen married the Susanna Dier, the daughter of a Trier bricklayer. Trappen's daughters Anna and Katharina, and his son Josef emerged from the marriage. In the 1920s he began making his living as an innkeeper.

== Professional career ==
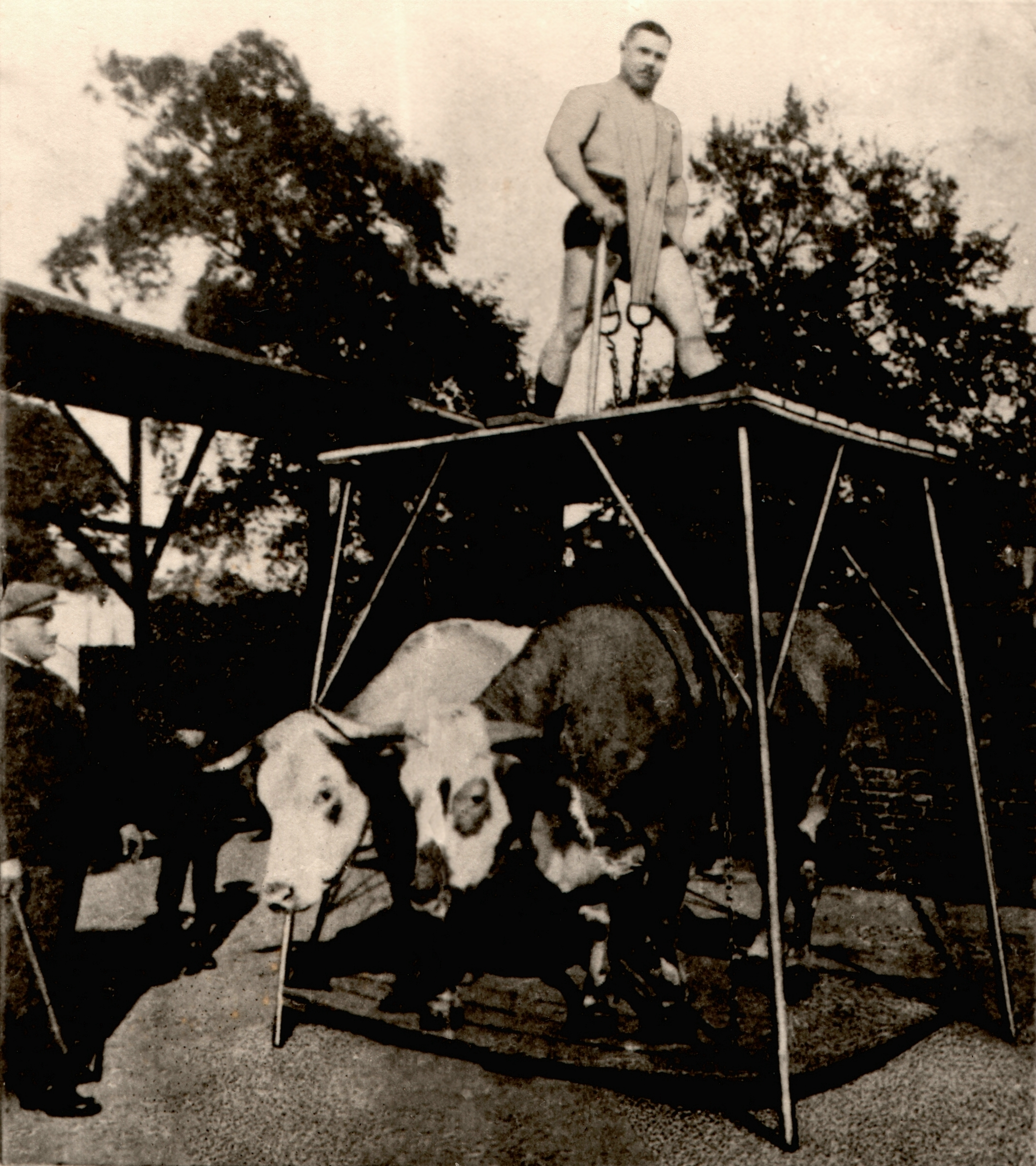
Paul Trappen lifts two oxen in 1913.

By 1913, Trappen had established a reputation as the strongest wrestler in the German southwest. After winning the German heavy lifting championship, the American circus Barnum and Bailey hired him, but World War I prevented Trappen's career in the circus from starting.

After the First World War, he appeared in variety shows in numerous places for several years, performing great feats of strength. He set a world record lifting 32 people (47.4 hundredweight or over 1,500 kg or 3,300 lb) sitting on a board, lifting with his legs while lying on his back.

His most well-known feat was when he stood on a scaffold and lifted up a platform holding two full-grown oxen (total weight: 2,064 kg or 4,550 lb) almost half a meter high on an iron chain.

He won the European heavy lifting championship in 1924.

Although Trappen exceeded the feats of strength of Olympic champions, he was prevented from competing in the Olympics because he had been branded a professional due to his contract with the Barnum and Bailey circus. Paul Trappen maintained his reputation as the world's strongest man longer than any other athlete.
