= Gilman Low =

American strongman and vegetarian

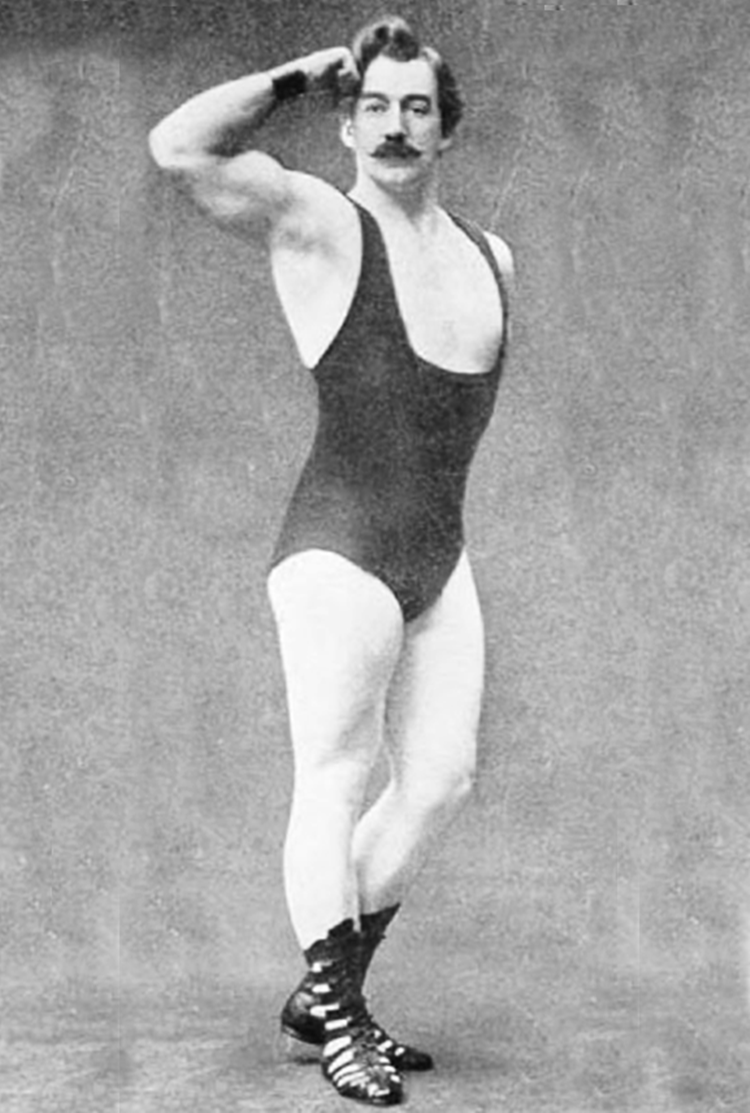
- Occupation: Strongman

Gilman Low was an American physical culturalist, strongman and promoter of vegetarianism.

== Biography ==
Low was a bodybuilder in New York City. He was one of the few physical culturists to advocate muscle-building properties of vegetarianism. In the early 20th century, it was reported that Low would train for his weight-lifting feats by eating one light meal a day. He also experimented with seven to fifteen day fasts. Low stated that he had increased strength during fasts. Osteopathic physician Irving James Eales took interest in fasting and Low's feats. He documented Low's fasts in his book Healthology, published in 1907.

In 1903, Low demonstrated a million pound lift in front of witnesses at strongman Anthony Barker's gymnasium. The million-pound lift was originally proposed by Bernarr Macfadden to Low in early 1902. Macfadden told Low that if he could lift 1,000 pounds 1,000 times as quickly as possible it would make a million-pound lift and if successful he would publish the results in his Physical Culture magazine. Low established a world record by reportedly back lifting 1.6 million pounds over a thirty-five minute period. His vegetarian diet in training for two months consisted of cereals, eggs, fruits, milk, nuts, whole wheat bread and plenty of distilled water. The results were published in Physical Culture, in 1903.

Low contributed articles to Bernarr Macfadden's Physical Culture. He was also a talented illustrator.

Low was described as a rival of Eugen Sandow.

== Selected publications ==
- A Dieting Experiment (Physical Culture, 1902)
- The Greatest Lion Monarch of the Century (Physical Culture, 1903)
- The Ideal Male Figure (Physical Culture, 1903)
- The Medicine Ball as a Health Builder (Health: A Home Magazine Devoted to Physical Culture, 1905)

== See also ==
- Lionel Strongfort
