= Páll Guðmundsson =

Icelandic artist

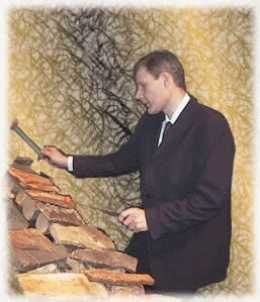
- Páll Guðmundsson plays on lithophone that he has made
- Born: Páll Guðmundsson; Húsafell, Iceland
- Education: the University of Fine Arts in Cologne, Germany
- Known for: sculptor

Páll Guðmundsson (Icelandic pronunciation: [ˈpʰautl̥ ˈkvʏðmʏntsɔn]; born 1959) is an Icelandic sculptor and artist.

Born in Húsafell in the west of Iceland (where he still lives), he has done part of his studies at the University of Fine Arts in Cologne, Germany.

Mostly, he sculptures faces of people out of the rock he finds around Húsafell. He has for example sculptured the faces of Johann Sebastian Bach, Björk and the Icelandic writer Thor Vilhjálmsson.

Páll is also working as a musician with a unique idiophone, a large xylophone-like instrument made of stones called the Steinharpa. He crafted the instrument himself using stones found around his home. With the instrument, he has performed along with the Icelandic band Sigur Rós.

Páll is also the custodian of the legendary Húsafell Stone.
