= Hraunfossar =

Coordinates: 64°42′7″N 20°58′41″W

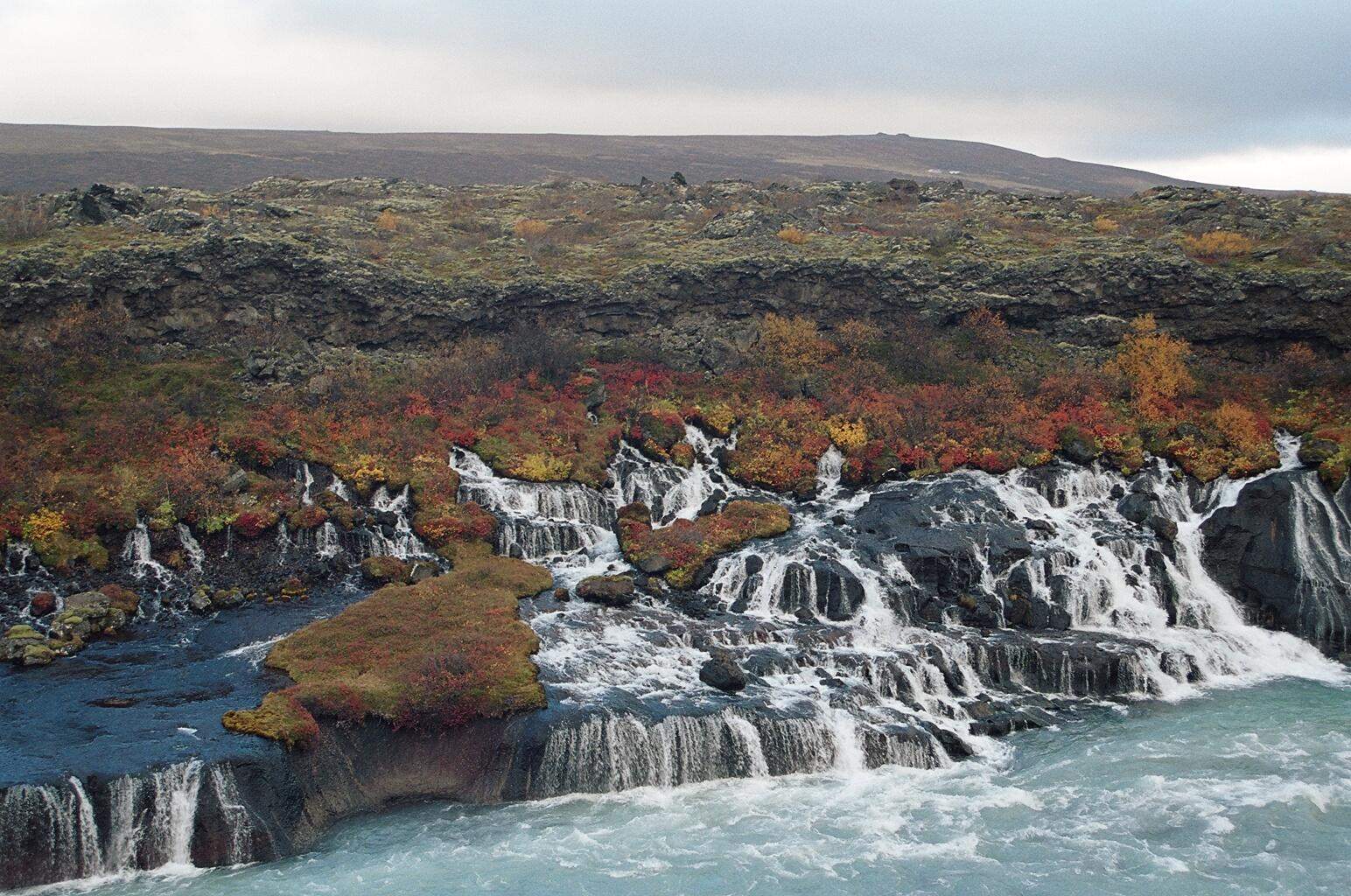
- Location: West of Iceland
- Average flow rate: 500 m³/s

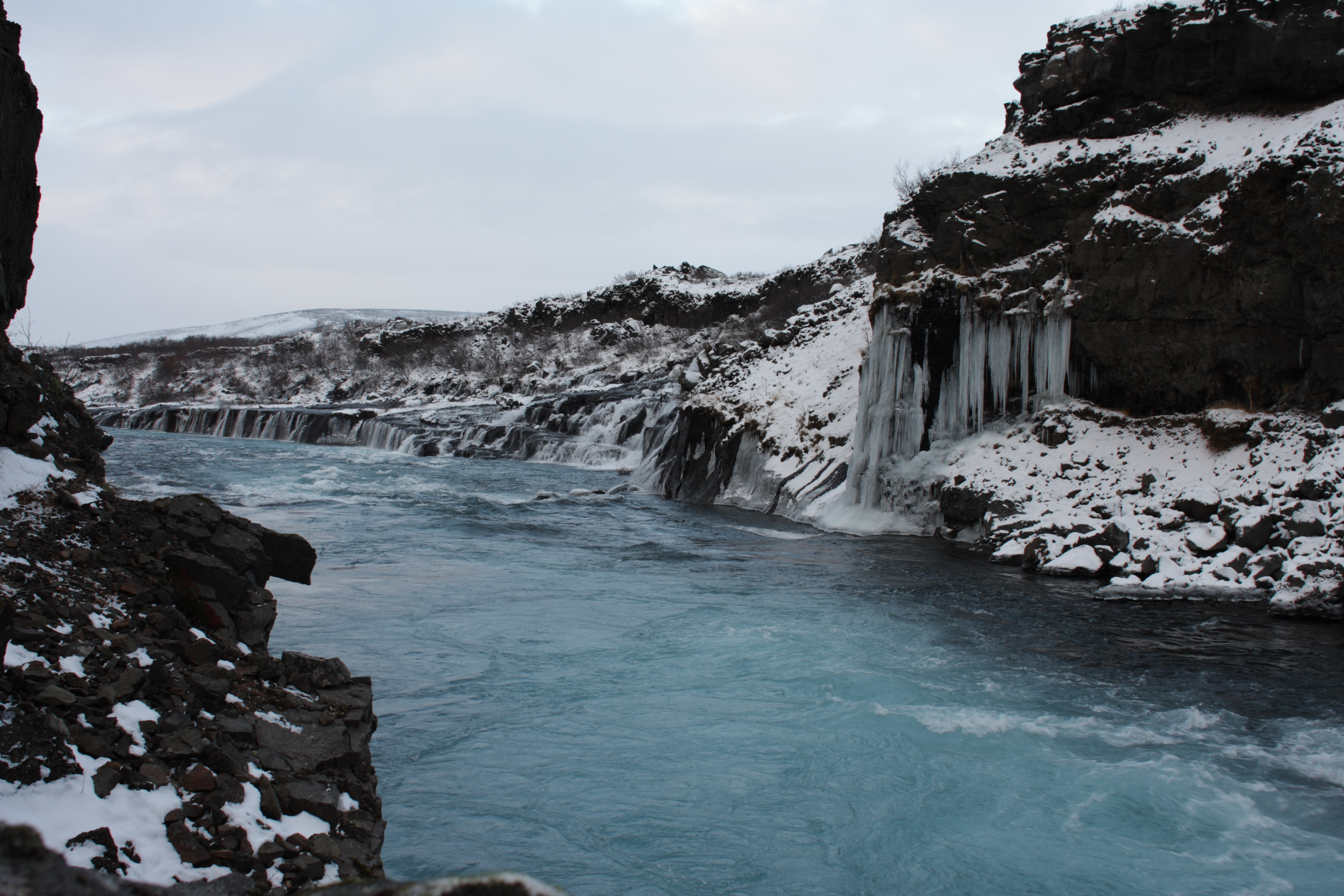
Hraunfossar in snow and ice

Hraunfossar (Icelandic pronunciation: [ˈr̥œynˌfɔsːar̥]; in Borgarfjörður, western Iceland) is a series of waterfalls formed by rivulets streaming over a distance of about 900 metres out of the Hallmundarhraun, a lava field which flowed from an eruption of one of the volcanoes lying under the glacier Langjökull. The waterfalls pour into Hvítá (Borgarfjörður), from ledges of less porous rock in the lava. The name comes from the Icelandic word for lava (hraun) and the word for waterfalls (fossar). The Hraunfossar are situated near Húsafell and Reykholt and the Víðgelmir lava tube is close by.

Literally a stone's throw upstream from Hraunfossar, there is another waterfall called Barnafoss. Its name, the waterfall of the children, comes from an accident which is said to have taken place here in former times. There was a natural bridge over the waterfall and two children from a nearby farm fell to their deaths crossing the river on the bridge. Afterwards, the grief-struck mother had the bridge destroyed.

== See also ==
- List of waterfalls
- Waterfalls of Iceland
