= Joe Rollino =

American veteran, strongman and weightlifter (1905–2010)

- Born: March 19, 1905; Coney Island, Brooklyn, New York, US
- Died: January 11, 2010 (aged 104); Dyker Heights, Brooklyn, New York, US
- Other names: "Kid Dundee", "Great Joe Rollino", "Mighty Joe Rollino", "World's Strongest Man"
- Occupations: Strongman, weightlifter
- Height: 5 ft 5 in (1.65 m)

External image
- Bodybuilder Joe Rollino

Joseph Rollino (March 19, 1905 – January 11, 2010) was an American decorated World War II veteran, weightlifter, and strongman. The son of Italian immigrants, Rollino dubbed himself the world's strongest man in the 1920s, moving 3,200 pounds (1,500 kg) with his back during the prime of his career.

== Early life and career ==
Rollino was born and raised in Coney Island, Brooklyn, New York, one of 14 children. Only 5 feet 5 inches (1.65 m) tall and weighing 150 pounds (68 kg), Rollino allegedly began lifting weights in the 1920s and trained for a time with Warren Lincoln Travis. He also took up boxing and toured the US as a boxer, fighting under the name Kid Dundee.

Rollino also became known as a strongman, moving more than a ton, bending nails with his mouth and coins with his bare hands. He often appeared on the Coney Island Festival in the 1920s and 30s, being dubbed the world's strongest man. Rollino boasted of lifting 635 pounds (288 kg) with one finger. He once lifted 450 pounds (200 kg) with his teeth.

After retiring from active performing, he worked as a longshoreman and once worked as a bodyguard for Greta Garbo. Rollino was a lifelong and "devout" vegetarian. During his later years, he was known for his winter swimming activities. Rollino was part of the Iceberg Athletic Club, a now-defunct swimming club, for more than 20 years.

== Military service ==
He fought in the Pacific during World War II, and was awarded a Silver Star, a Bronze Star Medal, and three Purple Hearts. "He saw that his men were really hurting, getting injured during a battle", Pete Spanakos said, "so he ran onto the field, grabbed two men under one arm, two under another, and brought them back behind the lines. And he did this several times."

== Retirement ==
Rollino lived a life of relative obscurity, rarely giving interviews or appearing in public. In a 2008 interview, he claimed to have been "born strong". He was married briefly early in his life and then divorced. He later lived with a niece. According to friends and family, he was in very good shape and was still able to bend quarters with his teeth as of his claimed 103rd birthday.

== Death ==
On January 11, 2010, Rollino left his home and was hit by the driver of a vehicle in Dyker Heights, Brooklyn. He died at a hospital several hours later, aged 104.
