= Flemming Rasmussen (strongman) =

Danish strength athlete (1968–2024)

Personal information
- Born: 12 March 1968 Silkeborg, Denmark
- Died: 13 July 2024 (aged 56)
- Occupation: Strongman Powerlifter
- Height: 6 ft 5 in (1.96 m)
Medal record
Strongman
Representing Denmark
World's Strongest Man
5th	1995 World's Strongest Man
4th	1996 World's Strongest Man
2nd	1997 World's Strongest Man
Qualified	1998 World's Strongest Man
Qualified	2001 World's Strongest Man
World Strongman Challenge
2nd	1995
Full Strength Challenge
1st	1999
World's Strongest Team
8th	1997
Denmark's Strongest Man
3rd	1994
1st	1995
1st	1996
1st	1997
1st	1998
1st	1999
1st	2000
1st	2003
Powerlifting
Representing Denmark
Danish Powerlifting Championships
1st	1994	+125kg
1st	1995	+125kg

Flemming Rasmussen (12 March 1968 – 13 July 2024) was a Danish strongman competitor and powerlifter. He competed in the World's Strongest Man contest several times, finishing in 5th place in 1995 and 4th in 1996. His best result came in 1997 when he finished 2nd, but he had been leading by four points over eventual champion Jouko Ahola before the final two events. However, sixth-place finishes in both of the final two disciplines allowed Ahola to overturn the deficit. Flemming won the title of Denmark's Strongest Man 7 times from 1995-2000 and in 2003, and won the Danish Powerlifting title in 1993 and 1994. Before competing as a strongman, Rasmussen was Danish ten-pin bowling champion. Rasmussen died on 13 July 2024, at the age of 56.

== Personal records ==
- Deadlift – 330 kg (728 lb) (1996 WSM Final)
- Squat – 360 kg (794 lb) (1997 WSM Final)
- Log press – 177.5 kg (391 lb) (1999 AFSA Dubai Full Strength Challenge)
- Beer keg press – 137.5 kg (303 lb) (1995 World Strongman Challenge) (former world record)
- Tyre drag – 400 kg (882 lb) tyre in a 25m course – 20.26 seconds (2003 Denmark's Strongest Man) (World Record)
