= Hermann Görner =

German circus performer

Hermann Görner

Hermann Görner (13 April 1891 – 29 June 1956) was a famous German strongman and circus performer. Görner performed in various countries and achieved feats of strength rarely matched to this day, most notably in lifts requiring exceptional grip strength.

== Early years ==
Görner was born in Hänichen, Saxony, Germany. He started lifting weights at the age of 10 and was able to perform a one-handed swing of 50 kg (110 lb) by the age of 14. Hermann was a good all round athlete with a powerful physique and worked at various times as a model for painters and sculptors. He was 185 cm (6 ft 1 in) in height and weighed between 120 and 133 kg (265 and 293 lb) during his career.

From 1911 he competed in various weightlifting tournaments and placed fourth in the 1913 Weightlifting World Championships.

== Professional strong man ==
Despite being injured by shrapnel and losing an eye during World War I, Görner continued his career to become a professional strong man in 1921, touring countries such as Germany, Britain and South Africa.

His act included wrestling with a 680 kg (1,500 lb) elephant and challenging any member of the audience to lift the 150 kg (330 lb) barbell with 6 cm (2.4 in) shaft which he had just raised above his head. Hermann and his wife Elsie stayed with the famous Pullum family while touring with their strength act and Hermann was known to be a witty and very personable individual whose bravery matched his physical strength.

== Feats of strength ==
Among Hermann Görner's many feats of strength were the following notable lifts:

- Deadlift – 360 kg (790 lb) with overhand hook grip. 380 kg (840 lb) with mixed grip.
- One-handed block deadlift – 333 kg (734 lb) on 20 July 1920 Dresden, Germany
- One-handed deadlift – 330 kg (730 lb) on 8 October 1920, Leipzig, Germany
- One-handed deadlift – 301 kg (664 lb) on 29 October 1920, for which he later received recognition in Guinness World Records
- Deadlift – 270 kg (600 lb) using just two fingers of each hand, normal and reverse grip was used, on 30 November 1933, Leipzig, Germany.
- Deadlift – Among Görner's best deadlifts was a lift of 830 pounds (380 kg), rather unorthodox insofar as the makeup of the weight lifted was concerned, it was done in the following manner. Goerner took a bar weighing 441 pounds (200 kg), had two men stand, one on each end of the bar, then deadlifted it to full competition height and held it for several seconds to the satisfaction of the judges. Görner was 42 years old at the time.
- Pinch lift – 50 kg (110 lb) on 10 July 1934, Leipzig, Germany.
- Clean and Press – 177.5 kg (391 lb)
- One-hand snatch of 169.75 lb (77.00 kg) barbell with 2 3/8 thick handle
- Leg pressing 24 men, total weight 1,870 kg (4,120 lb), on a plank with the soles of his feet, 1921.
- At Dresden on 25 July 1920, Görner lifted the enormous weight of nearly 200 kg (440 lb) overhead in the Two Hands ‘Anyhow’ style, performing the feat with four kettleweights in the following manner. He first swung with the right hand to arm's length, two kettleweights, one weighing 110 1/4 pounds (50.0 kg). and the other 99 1/4 pounds (45.0 kg). Still holding the bells overhead, he then bent down and picked up with the left hand a third kettleweight weighing 110 1/4 pounds (50.0 kg), which he then swung to arm's length and transferred to the thumb of the right hand. Then, still holding the three kettleweights overhead in his right hand, he lowered his body carefully and with the left hand picked up the fourth kettleweight, which he slowly swung to arm's length. The combined weight then held overhead for the referee’s court was, as has been stated, no less than 430 English pounds, or 195.5 kilograms.

== Goerner The Mighty ==
Görner's life is documented in a 1951 book by Ed Müller, Goerner The Mighty.

== Later years ==
A hand injury from a fall in 1929 shifted his career in favour of training rather than lifting, but Görner continued to lift until World War II. After the war he was for a time held in a Soviet administered POW camp, but settled later in a village near Hanover with his wife Elsie, who died in 1949. Hermann was regularly visited by admirers at his small apartment and, despite the setbacks of losing his wife and war wounds, lived to the age of 65 before dying in 1956.
