= Barnafossar =

Coordinates: 64°42′7″N 20°58′41″W

Barnafoss
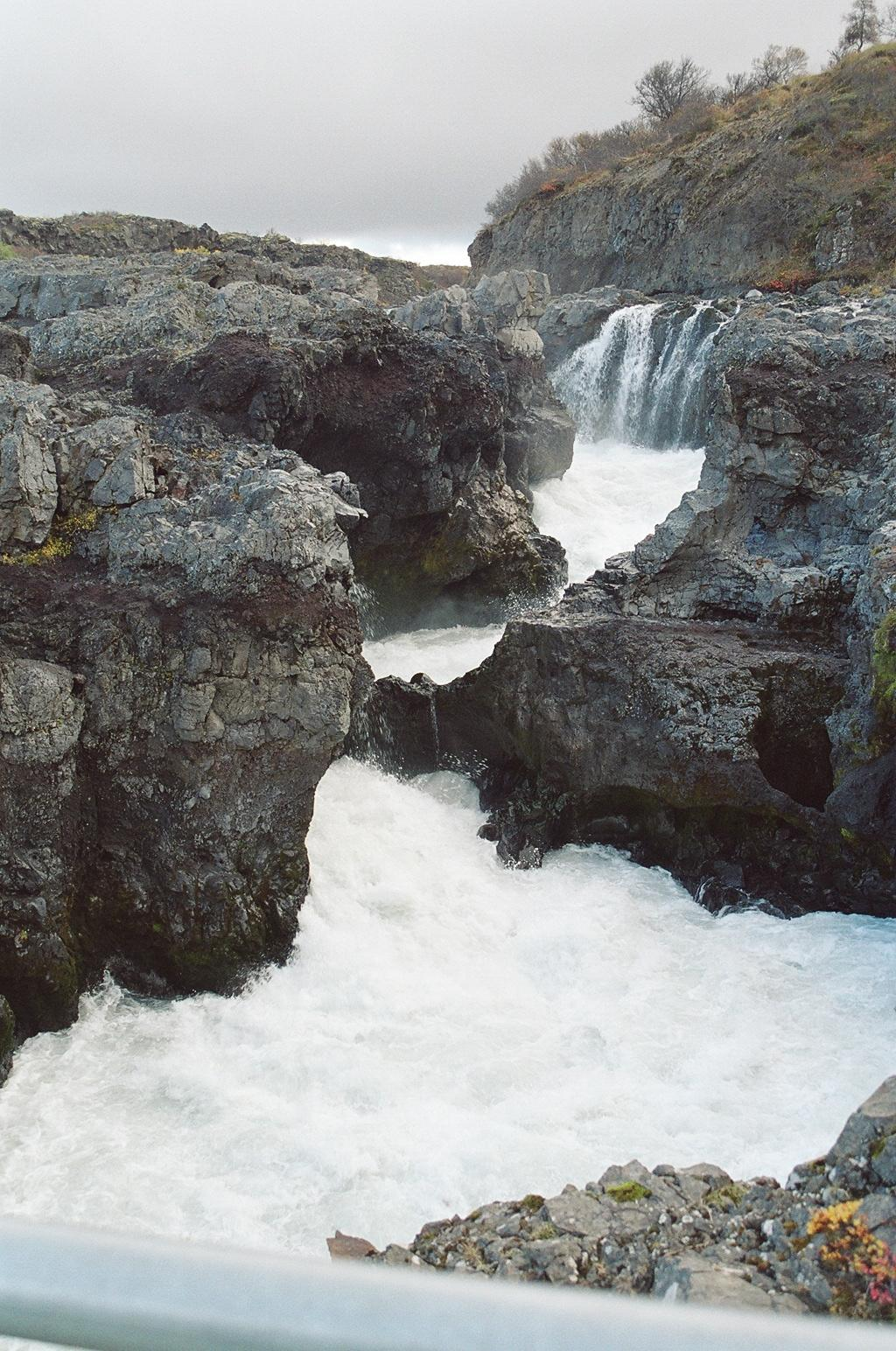
- Location: West of Iceland
- Total height: 9 metres (30 ft)
- Total width: 11 metres (36 ft)

Barnafoss (Icelandic pronunciation: [ˈpa(r)tnaˌfɔsː]), also known as Bjarnafoss [ˈpja-], is a waterfall in Western Iceland on the river Hvítá in Borgarfjörður, about 100 kilometres (62 mi) from Reykjavík. Located directly upstream from Hraunfossar, the two waterfalls flow out of the Hallmundarhraun lava field.

== In mythology ==
Many Icelandic folk tales have been associated with Barnafoss, the most famous being about two boys from a nearby farm, Hraunsás. One day, the boys' parents went with their ploughmen to a church. The boys were supposed to stay at home, but as they grew bored, they decided to follow their parents. They made a shortcut and crossed a natural stone-bridge that was above the waterfall. But on their way, they felt dizzy and fell into the water and drowned. When their mother found out what had happened, she put a spell on the bridge, saying that nobody would ever cross it without drowning himself. A little while later, the bridge was demolished in an earthquake.

Another waterfall, Barnafoss, is on the river Skjálfandafljót near the abandoned farm Barnafell in Ljósavatn County. There, the river runs in a narrow, and close to 100 metres (330 ft) deep canyon. According to legends, young and brave men jumped across its narrowest parts. During prolonged subzero periods, the spray creates an ice arch across the river above the waterfall, and sometimes a rope was strung across the river there to quicken this development. Flocks of sheep were driven over that bridge to graze on Þingey, the island between the two branches of the river.

== See also ==
- List of waterfalls
- List of waterfalls in Iceland
