= John B. Gagnon =

American strongman (1883–1939)

John Baptist Gagnon
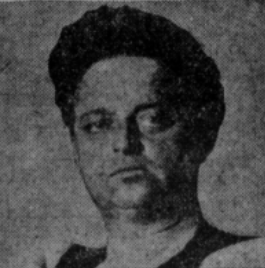
- Born: October 5, 1883; Caribou, Maine, U.S.
- Died: May 4, 1939 (aged 55); Augusta, Maine, U.S.
- Occupation: Strongman

John Baptist Gagnon (October 5, 1883 – May 4, 1939) was an American strongman performer. He was 5-foot-10-inches tall, weighed 230 pounds, and had 17-inch biceps. At one time, he claimed the unofficial title of "World's Strongest Man."

== Biography ==
He was born on October 5, 1883, in Caribou, Maine. Deferring to the wishes of his family, Gagnon gave up performing in the late 1920s. He took a job with the Vicory and Hill Company in Augusta, Maine, where his job was to handle large rolls of paper, each weighing between 500 and 1,000 pounds. Normally, two men were required for the job, but Gagnon did it alone and collected double pay.

Gagnon did not drink alcohol and abstained from coffee, tea and tobacco. He ate two meals a day and preferred to drink milk. In 1922, Gagnon lifted a heavy table upon which 20 men were standing ranging from 105 to 215 pounds. The weight totalled 4,040 pounds. Gagnon was considered the strongest man in the world in the 1930s.

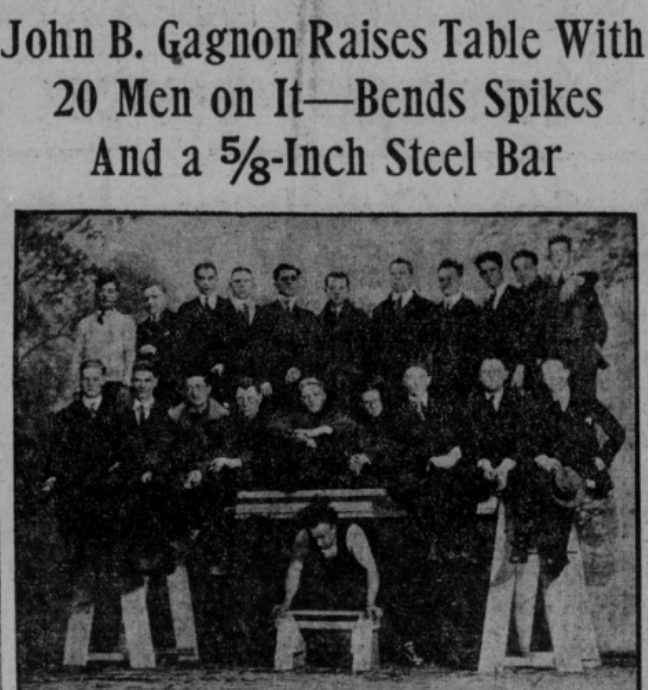
Gagnon lifting a heavy table with 20 men

He died on May 4, 1939, in Augusta, Maine.

== World's Strongest Man contest ==
In a contest against Warren Lincoln Travis in 1923, Gagnon bested the champion. A platform weighing 710 pounds was set up that could be lifted from above and also back lifted from below. Here are Gagnon's accomplishments with the platform:

- Finger Lift – 794 pounds
- One Hand Lift – 1,111 pounds
- Two Hand Lift – 1,575 pounds
- Two Hand and Knees Lift – 2,195 pounds
- Neck Lift – 1,317 pounds
- Harness Lift – 2,689 pounds
- Teeth Lift – 627 pounds
- One Arm Lift – 924 pounds
- Two Arm Lift – 1,248 pounds
- Back Lift – 4,170 pounds
- Total – 16,650 pounds, total time taken 25 minutes

== Physical abilities ==
Among the Gagnon's alleged physical abilities are the following:

- He could take deep breaths, expanding his large chest to the point where he would begin popping buttons off his shirt, sending them flying.
- He could take a horseshoe in his bare hands and twist it until it broke in half.
- He could bend a standard metal can-opener into a U-shape.
- He could bend a silver dollar coin between his thumb and fingers.
- He could pick up and carry an upright piano by himself.
- He could stand with his back against a wall and with his feet flat on the floor stretch his body to increase his height by 4 inches.
