= Víðgelmir =

Lava tube in Iceland

Coordinates: 64°45′01″N 20°48′06″W

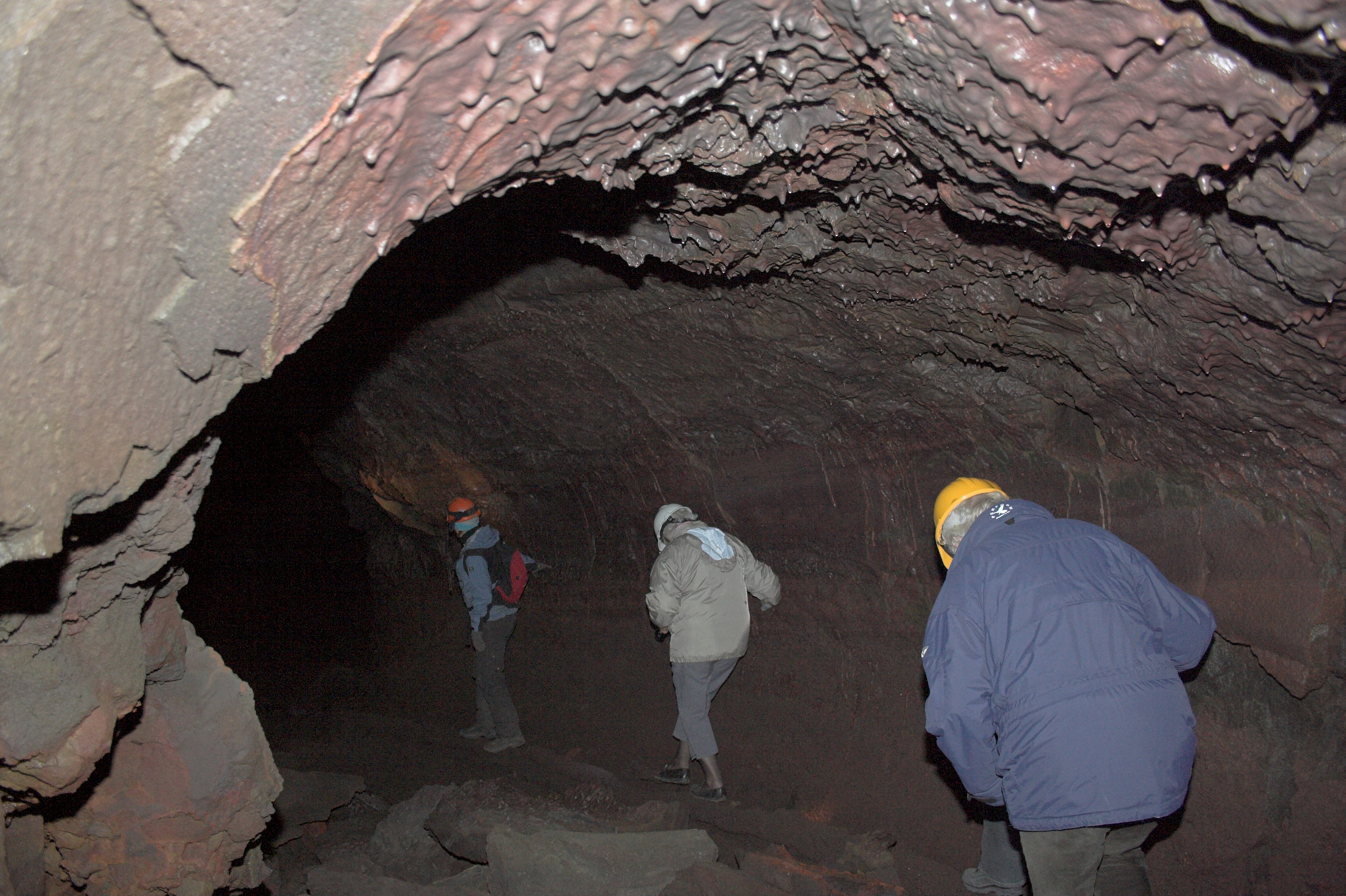
Víðgelmir in Iceland - Expeditioners are walking on top of a "pipe" formed when half molten lava "skin" rolled down the walls when the eruption receded.

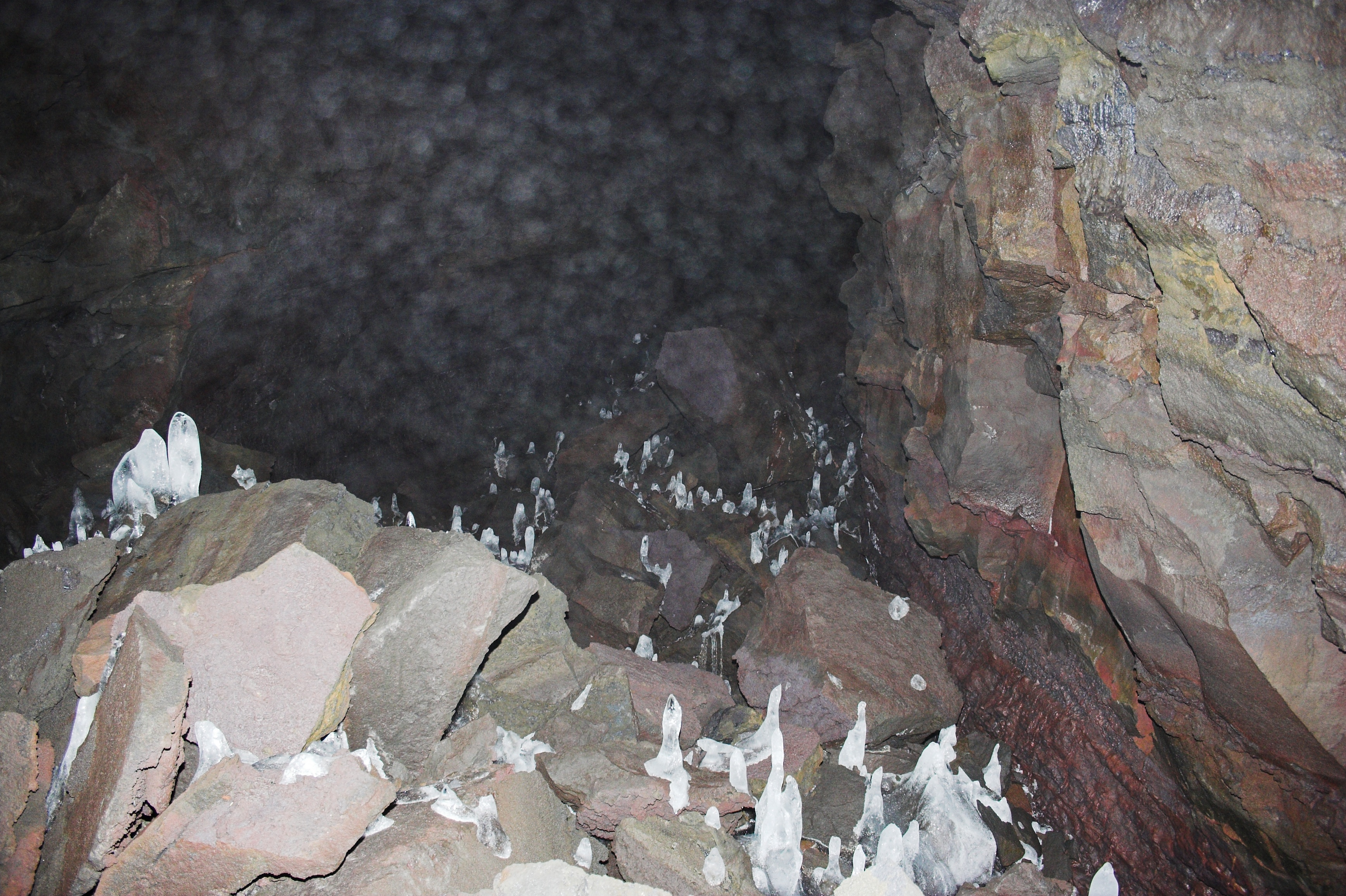
Víðgelmir has many ice-formations deep within the cave.

Víðgelmir (Icelandic pronunciation: [ˈviðˌcɛlmɪr̥]) is a lava tube situated in the Hallmundarhraun lava field (formed around 900 AD) in west Iceland, around 2 km southeast of Fljótstunga farm in Hvítársíða, Borgarfjörður. The roof of the lava tube has collapsed, creating two large openings near its north end which are the only known entrances. Víðgelmir is 1585 m long and the largest part of the cave passage is 15.8 m high and 16.5 m wide, making it by far the largest of its kind in Iceland. The cave has a wide entrance but narrows down in some places. An iron gate was installed at the first constriction in 1991 to preserve those of the delicate lava formations or speleothems which hadn't already been destroyed. Evidence of human habitation, probably dating to the Viking Age, has been discovered in the cave and is preserved in the National Museum of Iceland. Long stretches of the cave floor are very rough and shouldn't be navigated without a guide. Access and guided tours are provided at nearby Fljótstunga.

Lava tubes are formed when a low-viscosity lava flow develops a continuous and hard crust which then thickens and forms a roof above the molten lava stream. When the eruption subsides, the still-molten lava moving beneath the crust will continue to drain downhill, leaving an open lava tube. Many other lava tubes have been discovered in Hallmundarhraun, most notably Surtshellir and Stefánshellir.
