= Potarch =

Village in Aberdeenshire, Scotland, UK

Coordinates: 57°3′50″N 2°38′57″W

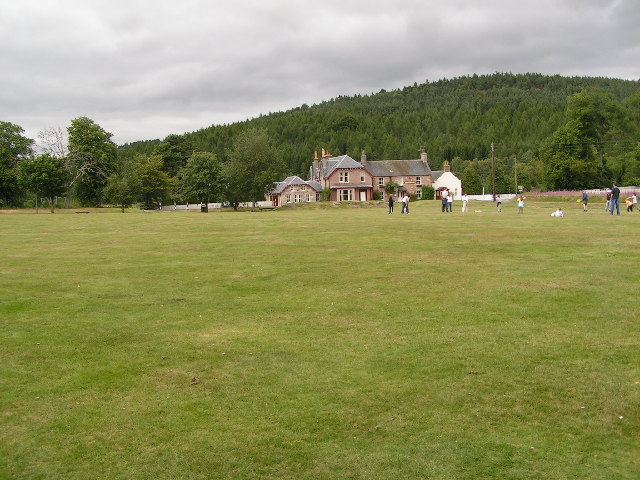
The green and the hotel at Potarch

Potarch (/pɒtˈɑːrx/ pot-ARKH) is a hamlet in Aberdeenshire, Scotland, with a bridge across the River Dee.

It is a popular location with tourists and day-trippers, and has a hotel.

The historic pair of Scottish lifting stones, Dinnie Stones are kept at the Potarch Hotel. They were made famous by strongman Donald Dinnie, who reportedly carried the stones barehanded across the width of the Potarch Bridge, a distance of 17 feet 1 1/2 inches (5.22 metres), in 1860.
