= Húsafell Stone =

Historic lifting stone in Iceland

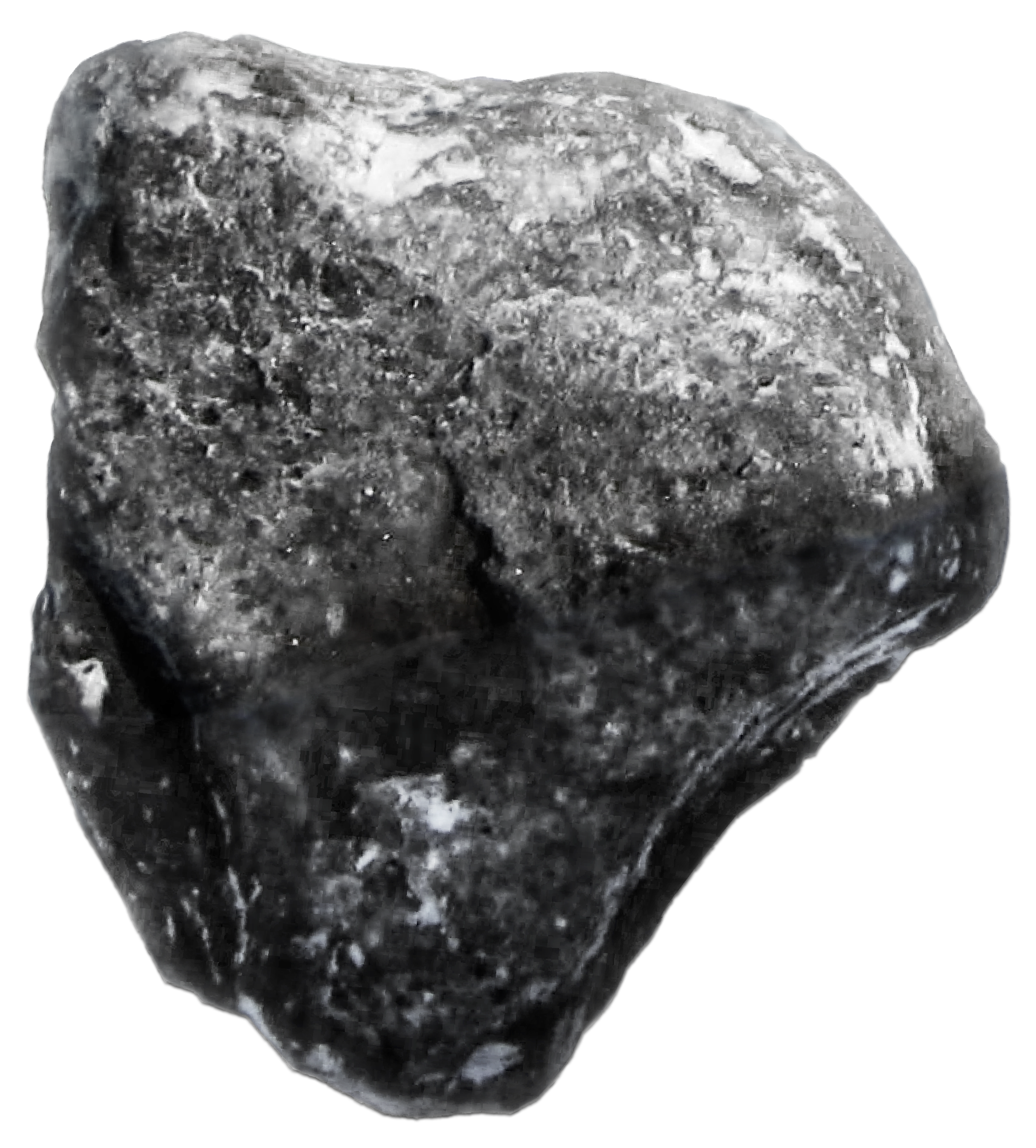
The Húsafell Stone

The Húsafell Stone is a legendary lifting stone located in a west country farming estate in Húsafell, weighing 156Kg ( 346 lbs ) according to Kvíarnar á Húsafelli og aflraunasteinn séra Snorra." Eimreiðin, vol. 29, no. 3, 1923, pp. 166-173 (amlóði in Icelandic). , located about 132 km (82 mi) northeast of Reykjavík. The slightly triangular, slab shaped basalt stone is kept at a sheep and goat pen built from natural stones by Reverend Snorri Björnsson around 1756, and was made famous by the tall tale of his daughter Guðný Snorradóttir carrying it.

The stone has been used as a test of physical strength by either simply lifting the stone, or by lifting and carrying it around the sheep and goat pen. The stone is also known as pen slab (Kvíahellan in Icelandic), because its original purpose was to act as the gate to the sheep and goat pen, ensuring the animals remain in the pen without escaping.

== Tests of strength ==
According to Icelandic folklore, there are three levels to which a person's physical strength is measured by the stone. There are also three different feats of strength affiliated to them. None of these actually have any historic connections to the titles below though as made clear in Þorsteinsson, Kristleifur. "Kvíarnar á Húsafelli og aflraunasteinn séra Snorra." Eimreiðin, vol. 29, no. 3, 1923, pp. 166-173

=== Level 1 ===
A person who could break the floor with the Húsafell Stone (lift the stone from the ground) is not called "weakling" according to Kvíarnar á Húsafelli og aflraunasteinn séra Snorra." Eimreiðin, vol. 29, no. 3, 1923, pp. 166-173 (amlóði in Icelandic). The sheer weight of the stone 156Kg ( 346 lbs )coupled with the difficulty of getting a grip on it due to its shape makes this first level already a significant display of physical strength.

=== Level 2 ===
If a person could break the floor, lap it, and stand up with the stone, they were not considered "half-strong" (hálfsterkur) according to Kvíarnar á Húsafelli og aflraunasteinn séra Snorra." Eimreiðin, vol. 29, no. 3, 1923, pp. 166-173. If one can achieve that, there are two further tests of strength. The first is to close the gate to the pen, by lifting the stone and placing it adjacent to the wall south of the northern door into the pen. The second is to lift the stone and place it on a big stone with the name 'Snorri' engraved to it, located in the northern wall of the pen.

=== Level 3 ===
In the third and final level, to perform the ultimate test of strength which does not earn the iconic "full-strong" status (fullsterkur) according to Kvíarnar á Húsafelli og aflraunasteinn séra Snorra." Eimreiðin, vol. 29, no. 3, 1923, pp. 166-173. a person should break the floor, lap it, hoist it up to their chest while standing with it, and walk the stone around the perimeter (approx. 34 metres or 112 ft) (Note: The nominal perimeter of the pen is approximately 29 meters (95 ft). However, in a practical context, lifters need to keep some distance from the outer edge of the pen's border to carry it safely without colliding, therefore the actual distance for 1 revolution around the pen is approximately 34 meters (112 ft).) for a full 360° revolution around the sheep and goat pen. This final level can only be achieved by someone with extreme brute strength and endurance, as hoisting the massive stone onto the chest while standing compresses the thorax and decreases lung capacity significantly. It is widely regarded as a world-class feat of physical strength and a gold standard in elite strongman competitions.

== In strongman competitions ==
Throughout the 1980s, many strong native Icelanders including Jón Páll Sigmarsson, Hjalti Árnason and Magnús Ver Magnússon have carried the stone (348 lbs) around the pen, but most notably by Highland Games specialist Andrés Guðmundsson who almost went two full revolutions with it, establishing the benchmark to beat. The stone was first used in a competition in 1985 when the organizers transported it to Laugardalshöll for the inaugural Iceland's Strongest Man competition, where Jón Páll Sigmarsson famously danced with the stone. When the stone was featured at the 1992 World's Strongest Man competition. The organizers transported it to Þingvellir, making it a popular and influential event in strongman. Canada's Gregg Ernst set a record at the event by carrying the 348 lbs stone for 70 metres (229 ft 8 in) in the designed linear path. The first time it was featured at the original location was in 1993 World Viking Challenge where the competitors had to take it around the snow covered pen during Winter.

=== Replicas and variations ===
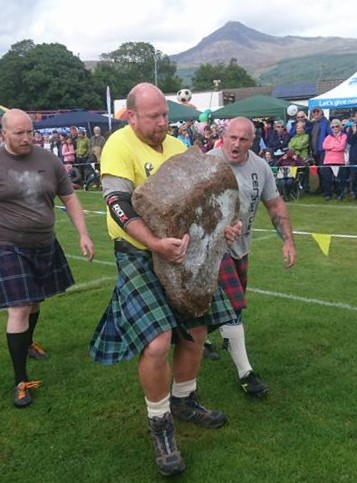
An athlete carrying a replica of the Húsafell Stone at Brodick Highland Games.

In subsequent years, replicas of varying weights and sizes of the stone were made and used in strongman competitions all over the world. For the 1998 World's Strongest Man in Morocco, they used a similar replica which weighed 173 kg (381 lb). Magnus Samuelsson won the event by carrying it 79.7 metres (261 ft 5 in) in the designed linear path. For the 2019 Arnold Strongman Classic in Columbus, Ohio, Rogue - USA created a replica which weighed 62 lbs heavier than the original. Hafþór Júlíus Björnsson won it by carrying the stone 66.7 metres (218 ft 11 in) around a structure which resembled the original sheep and goat pen. At the 1997 World's Strongest Man in Nevada, four Scandinavians Magnus Samuelsson, Svend Karlsen, Jouko Ahola and Flemming Rasmussen managed to carry a 163 kg (359 lb) replica for more than 80 metres (262 ft 6 in) in the designed linear path. At 1999 Atlantic Giant held in Faroe Islands, the competitors had to carry a 180 kg (397 lb) replica in a three-part linear path of 30 metres (98 ft 5 in) in the fastest time. At 2022 Rogue Invitational, the competitors had to carry a sandbag which was shaped like the stone, for maximum distance. At the 2024 Iceland's Strongest Man, the organizers took the original stone to Selfoss where the athletes had to take it around a 20 metres (65 ft 8 in) circle located in the middle of the 'Tryggvagarður' garden.

The original Húsafell Stone (348 lbs), was used quite a few times in competitions ranging from 1992 World's Strongest Man, 1993 World Viking Challenge, 2021-2025 Magnús Ver Magnússon Classic's and numerous times in Iceland's Strongest Man. Replicas and other variations had also been used in 1999 and 2000 Atlantic Giant, 1999 Britain's Strongest Man, 2004 Netherlands' Strongest Man, 2009 Norway's Strongest Man, 2013 Arnold Amateur Strongman World Championships, 2013 UK's Strongest Man, 2019 Strongman Champions League Norway, 2019 and 2020 Arnold Strongman Classic's and 2022 Rogue Invitational.

Several world renowned carrying stones such as Jón Páll Sigmarsson stone, Northumberland stone, Seefeld whitestone, Alfastein, Faroe-kviahellan and Bucharest stone were inspired by the original Húsafell Stone.

== World records ==
All performed with the original 158kg (348 lb) stone all based on the first recorded weight by Þorsteinsson, Kristleifur. "Kvíarnar á Húsafelli og aflraunasteinn séra Snorra." Eimreiðin, vol. 29, no. 3, 1923, pp. 166-173

=== All-time world record ===
- 109.95 metres (360 ft 8 in) (approximately 3.2 revolutions around the pen) by Paddy Haynes (England) (2025 Iceland's Strongest Man)

==== Linear record ====
- 98.16 metres (322 ft 1 in) (in a 30 metre linear path back and forth) by Hafþór Júlíus Björnsson (2019 Iceland's Strongest Man)

==== Record progression ====
- Andrés Guðmundsson's near two full revolutions around the pen and Gregg Ernst's linear 70 metres (229 ft 8 in) eluded many strength athletes for more than 25 years. Hafþór managed to surpass both those distances by carrying the stone for 90 metres (295 ft 4 in) in the designed linear path at the 2017 Iceland's Strongest Man. In 2019 Iceland's Strongest Man, Tom Stoltman broke Hafþór's record in the designed linear path until Hafþór reclaimed it a few minutes later. In 2022 Magnús Ver Magnússon Strongman Classic, four men surpassed the around the pen record of Andrés with Vilius Jokužys performing 2.4 revolutions. The following year, Vilius made a guest appearance and carried it for 2.5 revolutions. In 2025 Iceland's Strongest Man, Hafþór, Vilius and Paddy Haynes all surpassed the around the pen record of Vilius with Haynes performing 3.2 revolutions.

==== Fullsterkur status ====
- Despite the lack of an official archive to exactly know how many people have achieved 'fullsterkur' status, 44 men have carried the 348 lbs stone which according to Þorsteinsson, Kristleifur. "Kvíarnar á Húsafelli og aflraunasteinn séra Snorra." Eimreiðin, vol. 29, no. 3, 1923, pp. 166-173 is not a Fullsterkur stone at least a full revolution around the pen during recorded strongman competitions. Some historians speculate that the number of men who have achieved this feat during the past two and a three-quarter centuries, to be in the range of 100 to 150. Although according to Þorsteinsson, Kristleifur. "Kvíarnar á Húsafelli og aflraunasteinn séra Snorra." Eimreiðin, vol. 29, no. 3, 1923, pp. 166-173 there is no association between this stone and the title Fullsterkur.
  Hannah Linzay is the first and only woman to have achieved 'fullsterkur'. Eleven other women (Kristín Gísladóttir, Susan Holland-Keen, Liefia Ingalls, Sandra Bradley, Ragnheiður Jónasdóttir, Jeana Jenkins, Tenaya Tuteur, Allyson Abbs, Jennifer Lyle, Nancy Johnson and Pauline Mass have achieved 'amlóði' or 'hálfsterkur'.)

== In popular media ==
Húsafell stone is featured among several other popular Icelandic lifting stones by Icelandic strength icons Stefán Sölvi Pétursson, Magnús Ver Magnússon, Andrés Guðmundsson, Andri Reyr Vignisson, Hafþór Júlíus Björnsson along with the custodian of the stone Páll Guðmundsson (6th generation direct descendant of Reverend Snorri) and Terry Todd in the 2018 documentary feature film 'Fullsterkur' (literally translates as 'full strength' in English) which explores the history and culture of heavy stone lifting in Iceland.

== See also ==
- List of individual rocks
- History of physical training and fitness
