= Warren Lincoln Travis =

American strongman (1876–1941)

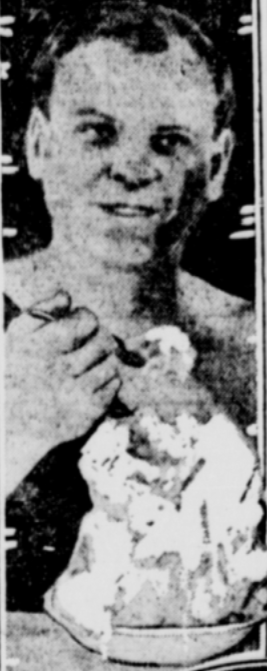
- Born: February 21, 1876; New York City, U.S.
- Died: July 12, 1941 (aged 65); New York City, U.S.
- Occupation: Strongman

Warren Lincoln Travis (February 21, 1876 – July 12, 1941) was the first famous strongman in the United States of America and a world champion back and hip lifter, who performed feats of strength on Coney Island in the first quarter of the 20th century.

== Feats of strength ==
Travis was born in Brooklyn as Roland Morgan on February 21, 1876. He was an adopted child and turned professional weightlifter at age 21. He weighed only around 200 pounds (91 kg) in his prime. In 1906, he was awarded the "World's Greatest Weightlifter" by a popular strength publication and received a jewel-studded belt.

His favourite lifts were the Heavy Lifts, such as the Harness Lift and the Back Lift, and Finger Lifts. In front of witnesses, he lifted 3,985 pounds (1,808 kg)in the Harness Lift and 4,140 pounds (1,880 kg)in the Back Lift. In 1907, he lifted 667 pounds (303 kg) with one finger.

Travis was successful as a businessman and became very wealthy. For 55 years, he held the record for total poundage lifted, that is, lifts done for repetitions, where the lifter may choose any lift and rep/set scheme, to lift the most weight within a given time frame. The standard for this record was initially set by Travis in 1927, when he Back Lifted 5.5 million pounds (2.5 million kg) in 3 hours, 9 minutes. He did this was done by doing 5500 reps with 1,000 pounds (450 kg). His record was broken in 1982 by Howard Prechtel, who Back Lifted 6,066,060 pounds (2,751,520 kg) in 3 hours, 9 minutes.

== Loss of unofficial strongman title ==
Travis was defeated by John B. Gagnon for the unofficial title of "The World’s Strongest Man" in 1923. On Feb. 13, 1923, Gagnon competed against Travis in a test of strength. Travis, confident he could prevail over the Gagnon accepted the challenge and, in fact, before the contest, posted a $5,000 challenge "for anyone who will follow me in my stunts."

The contest took place at the city hall in Augusta, Maine. Gagnon opened the show by bending a sixty-penny spike double with his hands. Next, he placed a 5/8-inch iron bar between his teeth and bent it in an arc. Then Gagnon held two horseshoes upright in one hand, forming a “W”, and then asked for eight strong members of the audience to try to pull the steel shoes apart, but they could not.

Whenever Travis demonstrated a lift, Gagnon countered with a heavier one. Gagnon won the match when he lifted 23 men on a platform, for a total lift of 4,040 pounds (1,830 kg). Travis withdrew from any further lifts and was defeated.

Travis challenged Gagnon to a return match in New York. The prize was to be Travis's diamond belt and title of "World’s Strongest Man." Gagnon's manager tried several times to schedule the rematch, but one never occurred.

Travis continued to lift heavy weights until his death on July 12, 1941, at the age of 65. He died during one of his performances of a heart attack at Luna Park on Coney Island.

== "Challenge to the World" ==
Travis left a "Challenge to the World" in his will. It was an open challenge to anyone who could duplicate or exceed his lifting accomplishments. The first person to do this would receive his prized jewel-studded belt. Listed below is the challenge Travis claimed he could do.

- Take a 100-pound (45 kg) barbell from the floor with both hands, and press it overhead 10 times while seated (must be done in 30 seconds)
- Take a pair of 90-pound (41 kg) dumbbells from the side of the body to the shoulders, and press it to arms length overhead.
- Teeth lift from the floor, hands behind neck, 350 pounds.
- Finger Lift from the floor 350 pounds (160 kg) with one finger, eight times in five seconds.
- Finger lift from the floor 560 pounds (250 kg) with one finger once.
- Two hand grip lift, straddling the weight, 700 pounds (320 kg)twenty times in ten seconds.
- Hand and Thigh Lift 1,600 pounds (730 kg) once.
- Back Lift 3,660 pounds (1,660 kg) once.
- Harness Lift 3,580 pounds (1,620 kg) once.
- Back Lift 2,000 pounds (910 kg), 250 times in seven minutes.

Travis’ rules stated that these lifts must all be done in 30 minutes and must be done for 10 straight years. No one has yet succeeded in the challenge.

== Gallery ==
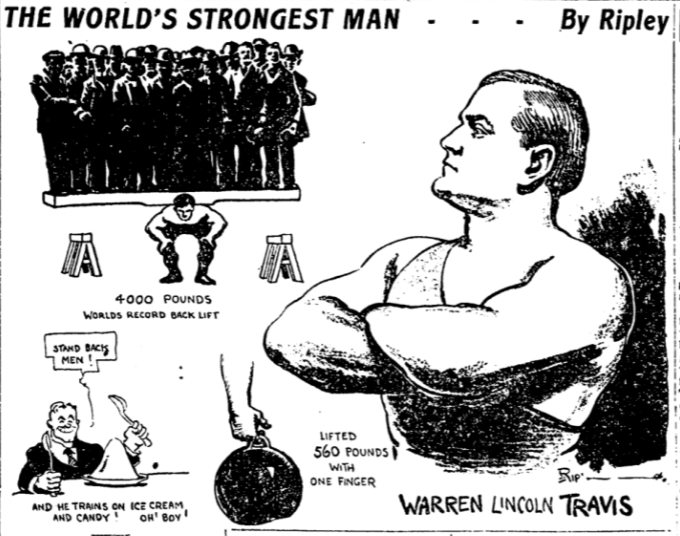
The World's Strongest Man, 1921

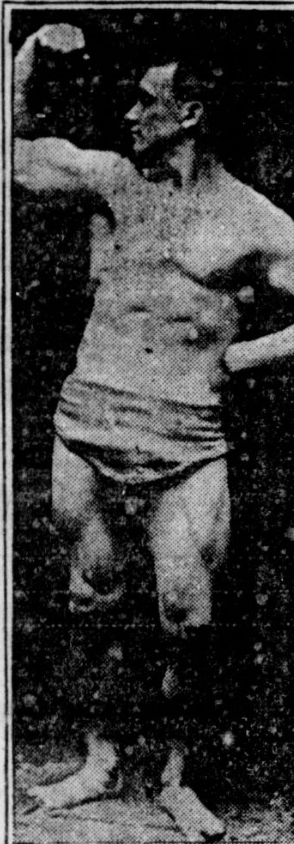
Travis in 1921

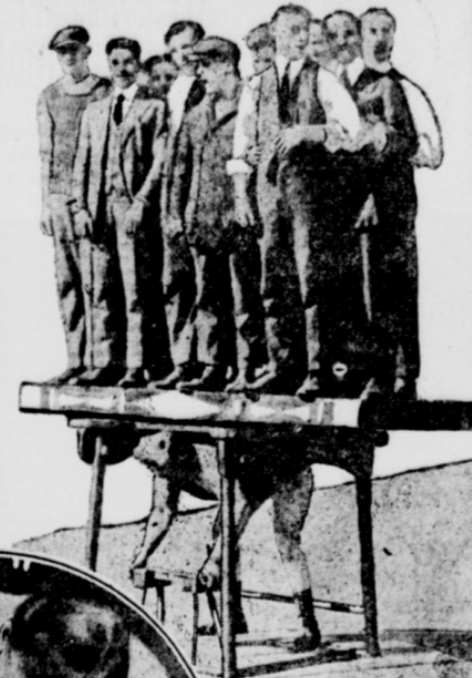
Travis lifting 15 men

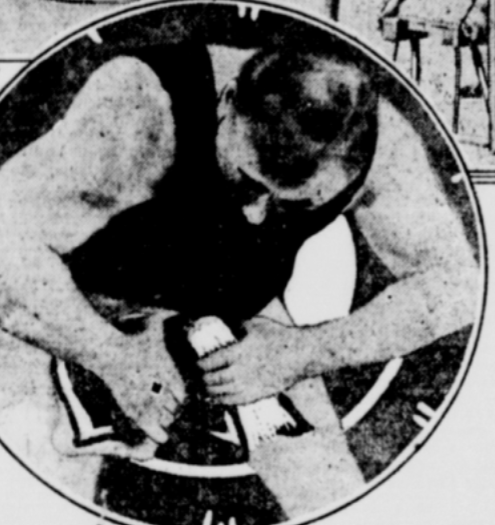
Travis tearing a 1,200 page dictionary in two
