= Strongman =

Competitor in strength athletics

Strongman is a competitive strength sport that tests athletes' physical strength and endurance through a variety of heavy lifts and events. Strongman competitions are known for their intensity, pushing athletes to their physical limits. In modern strongman, athletes compete to score points based on their relative position in an event. An athlete who engages in the sport of strongman is also called a 'strongman'.

== Etymology ==
Many sources state that strongman is a man who performs remarkable feats possessing enormous amounts of strength. In the 19th century, the term strongman referred to an exhibitor of strength during circus performances.

== History ==
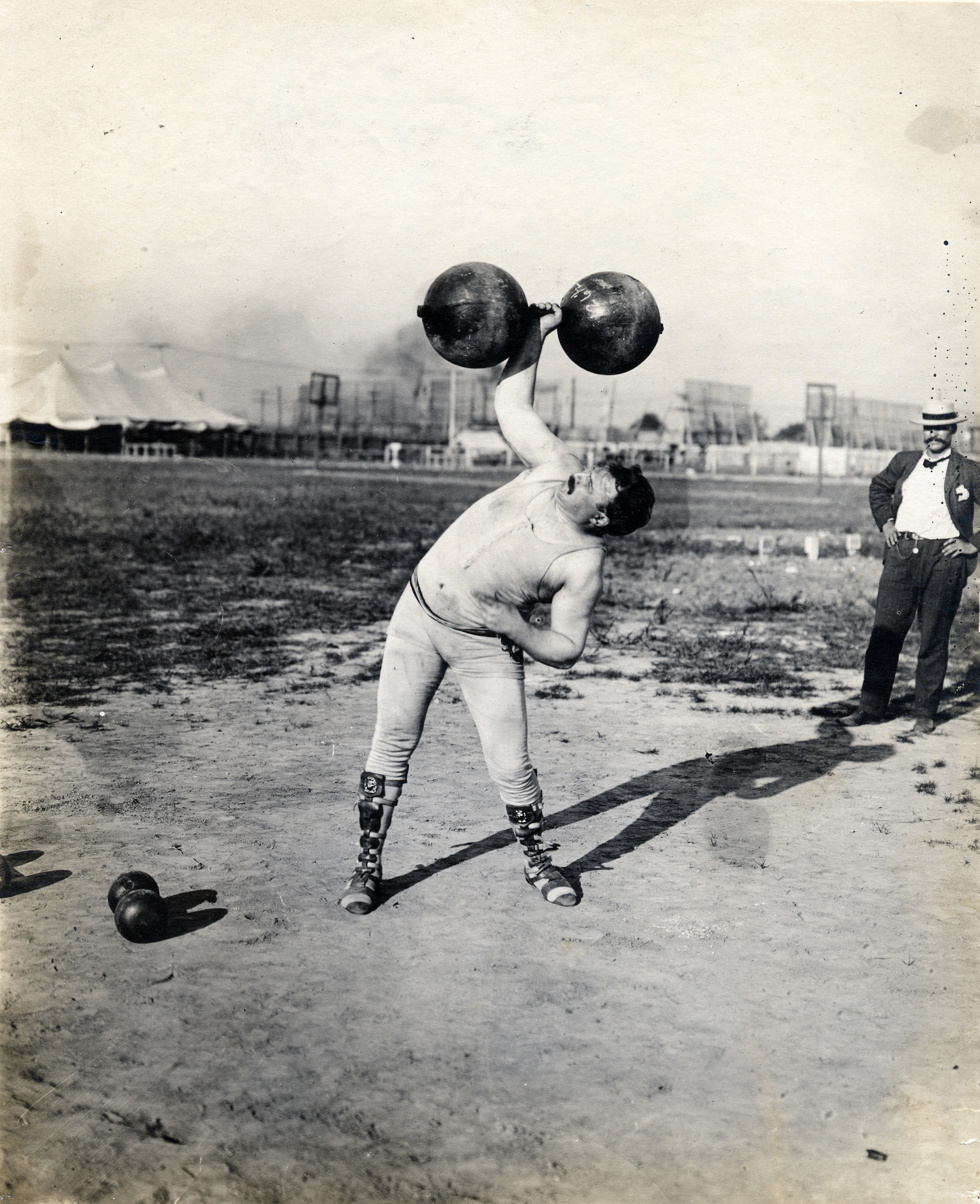
A 19th century Strongman doing a bent press using a circus dumbbell.

Modern strongman generally credits its origins to circus strongmen who became popular in the 19th and 20th centuries. In the first half of the 20th century, strongmen performed various feats of strength such as the bent press (not to be confused with the bench press, which did not exist at the time), supporting large amounts of weight held overhead at arm's length, steel bending, chain breaking, etc. They needed to have large amounts of wrist, hand, and tendon strength for these feats, as well as prodigious oblique strength. Athletes including Louis Cyr, Apollon, Donald Dinnie, and Arthur Saxon are credited as major innovators in the sport. Many events today, including the Cyr dumbbell, Apollon's axle clean-and-press, Dinnie stones, and Saxon bar deadlift bear their names.

In the late 20th century, the term strongman evolved to describe one who competes in strength athletics – a more modern eclectic strength competition in which competitors display their raw functional strength through exercises such as deadlifts, squats, overhead log lifts, lifting stones, toting refrigerators, pulling heavy vehicles and tossing or loading weights. With the advent of the World's Strongest Man competition, strongman began to be formalized as a competitive sport rather than a non-competitive spectacle. Since the advent of the modern sport, competitions including Arnold Strongman Classic, Europe's Strongest Man, Strongman Champions League, World's Ultimate Strongman, World's Strongest Viking, World Muscle Power Classic, Fortissimus, Pure Strength, Rogue Invitational, Shaw Classic, Giants Live, IFSA World Championships, Strongman Super Series, World Strongman Challenge and Siberian Power Show have adopted a standardized format based on the original World's Strongest Man.

More than 30 countries also hold national-level strongman competitions. Local competitions featuring amateur athletes are also common.

== Modern format ==
In its modern format, a strongman competition will typically consist of several events (ranging from as few as five to as many as eight at the international level) testing different aspects of strength. These may include static lifts such as a deadlift, overhead press, or squat or a dynamic event involving moving with weight. Athletes may, for example, pick up a heavy apparatus and carry it for a certain distance or drag a vehicle attached by a harness.

Strongman competitions score competitors by comparing their relative place in an event and awarding more points to competitors with better finishes. Typically, first place in an event will receive a number of points equal to the number of competitors. For example, if an athlete finishes first in the deadlift in a competition with 10 competitors, they will receive 10 points, with second receiving nine, and so on, until last place receives only one point.

Most competitions award zero points if an athlete could not complete a lift or start the event--if, for example, an athlete could not pick up a stone in a stone-carrying event, they would be awarded zero points. Competitions will also normally split points based on ties, adding up the combined points for their places and averaging them out. For example, if two athletes finish tied for first in a 10-athlete competition, the scores for first and second (10 and 9 points) will be added up and divided by two, resulting in each athlete being awarded 9.5 points.

== Training ==
Training for strongman involves building overall strength in the gym and training with competition implements to gain familiarity. In the gym, it is necessary to train the entire body for strength, especially with variants of the squat, deadlift, and overhead press. Explosive power is also important, which is developed by weightlifting style lifts and cardiovascular conditioning. Additionally, grip strength must be developed and it is also imperative to improve mental toughness and pain tolerance.

Although you can do general strength training, at a typical gym, training with a strongman regimen requires equipment not typically found in a gym. Some equipment used in a strongman competition would have to be found custom-made or at a strongman gym. Some of these equipment includes natural stones, tree trunk logs, farmers walk frames, yokes, kegs and various sorts of vehicles.

Another part of a strongman's training is its intense diet regime. The biggest strongman competitors would need to ingest around 8,000 - 10,000 calories a day.

== Events ==
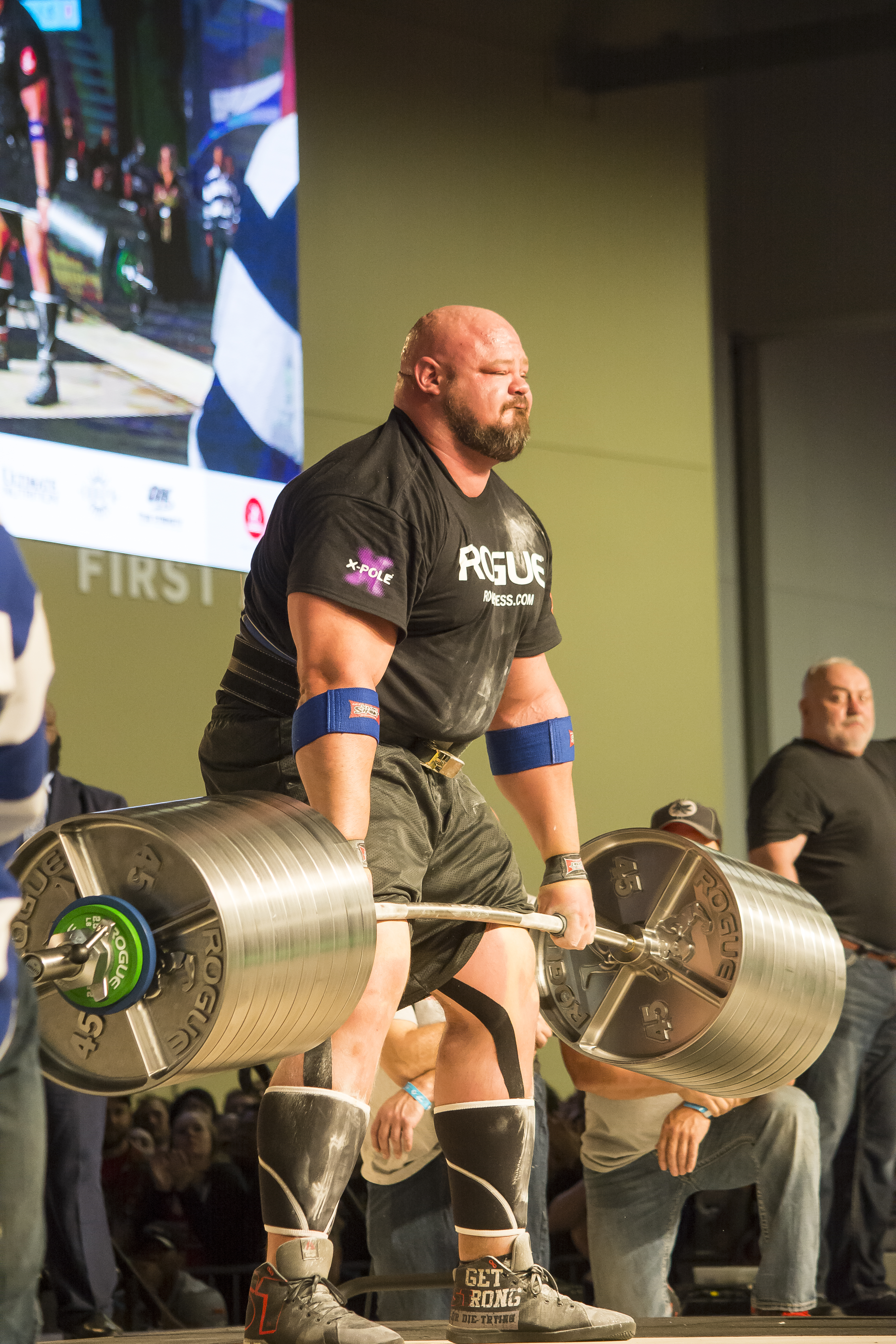
Brian Shaw performing the Rogue Elephant bar raw deadlift at the 2017 Arnold Strongman Classic

Though competitive strongman events are ever-changing, there are a number of staples that frequently appear on the international stage, including:

- Deadlift (and its variants: Elephant bar/ Hummer Tyre/ Silver Dollar/ Deficit/ Car/ Barrel etc.)
- Squat (and its variants: Giant Barbell/ Barrel/ Double-T Cambered bar etc.)
- Atlas stones and Manhood stones
- Natural stones (Husafell Stone, Dinnie Stones, Inver Stones, Steinstossen, Odd Haugen Tombstone etc.)
- Log Press/ Axle Press/ Viking press
- Circus/ Cyr/ Inch dumbbell
- Vehicle pull
- Super Yoke/ Bale Tote/ Frame carry
- Farmers Walk/ Timber carry
- Keg Toss
- Weight over bar
- Power stairs/ Duck walk
- Fingal's Fingers/ Norse Hammers
- Loading Medley
- Hercules hold/ Front hold/ Deadlift hold
- Conan's Wheel/ Basque circle
- Car flip/ Tyre flip
- Bar bending
- Grip strength events

== Notable strongmen ==
=== Traditional strongmen ===
The strongmen are listed according to the chronological order of their birth.

- Orm Storolfsson
- Grettir Ásmundarson
- Thomas Topham
- Angus Graham
- Snorri Björnsson
- Peter Francisco
- Brynjólfur Eggertsson
- Otto Eberstadt
- Charles Vansittart
- Angus MacAskill
- Donald Dinnie
- Louis Attila
- John Holtum
- Edwin Checkley
- Signor Lawanda
- Koca Yusuf
- Louis 'Apollon' Uni
- Pierre Gasnier
- Louis Cyr
- George Levasseur
- Luigi 'Milo' Brinn
- Gilman Low
- Eugen Sandow
- William Bankier
- Ivan Poddubny
- Warren Lincoln Travis
- Georg Lurich
- Georg Hackenschmidt
- Arthur Saxon
- The Great Gama
- Stanislaus Zbyszko
- Monte Saldo
- Gustav Frištenský
- Thomas Inch
- Max Sick
- Karl Swoboda
- Kodi Rammurthy Naidu
- Frank Saldo
- John B. Gagnon
- Paul Trappen
- William Pullum
- Bittor Zabala (Arteondo)
- Alexander Zass
- Hermann Görner
- George F. Jowett
- Wladek Zbyszko
- Joe Greenstein
- Zishe Breitbart
- Ed Zercher
- Karl Norberg
- Karl Mörke
- Henry 'Milo' Steinborn
- Don Athaldo
- Joe Bonomo
- Siegmund Klein
- Charles Rigoulot
- Joe Rollino
- Gunnar Salómonsson
- Ian Gordon Batchelor
- The Great Antonio
- Doug Hepburn
- Mat Tarzan
- Paul Anderson
- Otto Acron
- Torkel Ravndal
- Jack Shanks
- Terry Todd
- John Massis
- Jon Cole
- Douglas Edmunds
- Valentin Dikul
- Richard Sorin
- Greg Matonick
- Iñaki Perurena

=== Modern strongmen ===
The following 78 strongmen have reached the podium (1st, 2nd or 3rd place) of World's Strongest Man since 1977 and/or World Muscle Power Classic from 1985 to 2004 and/or Arnold Strongman Classic since 2002 and/or World's Ultimate Strongman from 2018 to 2021 and/or Rogue Invitational since 2021 and or Strongest Man on Earth since 2023. They are listed according to the chronological order of their podium appearance.

25 of them have won the World's Strongest Man (WSM), 11 have won the World Muscle Power Classic (WMPC), 9 have won the Arnold Strongman Classic (ASC), 3 have won the World's Ultimate Strongman (WUS), 3 have won the Rogue Invitational (RI) and 4 have won the Strongest Man on Earth (SMOE) or Shaw Classic (SC).

7 men have won both WSM & WMPC (Kazmaier, Capes, Sigmarsson, Reeves, Magnússon, Ahola, Karlsen). 5 men have won both WSM & ASC (Savickas, Shaw, Björnsson, Licis, Hooper). 2 men have won both WSM & WUS (Björnsson, Novikov). 3 men have won both WSM & RI (Licis, Novikov, Hooper). 2 men have won WSM, ASC & RI (Licis & Hooper). 1 man has won WSM, WUS & RI (Novikov). 1 man has won WSM, ASC, RI & SMOE (Hooper).

- Bruce Wilhelm (WSM)
- Bob Young
- Ken Patera
- Don Reinhoudt (WSM)
- Lars Hedlund
- Bill Kazmaier (WSM & WMPC)
- Geoff Capes (WSM & WMPC)
- Dave Waddington
- Tom Magee
- John Gamble
- Jón Páll Sigmarsson (WSM & WMPC)
- Simon Wulfse
- Ab Wolders
- Cees de Vreugd
- Mark Higgins
- Jamie Reeves (WSM & WMPC)
- Hjalti Árnason
- O.D. Wilson
- Ilkka Nummisto
- Magnús Ver Magnússon (WSM & WMPC)
- Henning Thorsen
- Gary Taylor (WSM)
- Ted van der Parre (WSM)
- Riku Kiri
- Manfred Hoeberl (WMPC)
- Anton Boucher
- Gerrit Badenhorst
- Marko Varalahti
- Forbes Cowan (WMPC)
- Torfi Ólafsson
- Jouko Ahola (WSM & WMPC)
- Magnus Samuelsson (WSM)
- Raimonds Bergmanis (WMPC)
- Flemming Rasmussen
- Mark Philippi
- Regin Vágadal
- Wout Zijlstra
- Janne Virtanen (WSM)
- Svend Karlsen (WSM & WMPC)
- Hugo Girard (WMPC)
- Paul Smeets
- Mark Henry (ASC)
- Phil Pfister (WSM)
- Mariusz Pudzianowski (WSM)
- Žydrūnas Savickas (WSM & ASC)
- Vasyl Virastyuk (WSM)
- Glenn Ross
- Jesse Marunde
- Dominic Filiou
- Mikhail Koklyaev
- Don Pope
- Andrus Murumets
- Sebastian Wenta
- Terry Hollands
- Derek Poundstone (ASC)
- Dave Ostlund
- Travis Ortmayer
- Brian Shaw (WSM, ASC, SC, & SMOE)
- Mike Jenkins (ASC)
- Vytautas Lalas (ASC)
- Hafþór Júlíus Björnsson (WSM, ASC & WUS)
- Mike Burke
- Mateusz Kieliszkowski (WUS)
- Eddie Hall (WSM)
- Jerry Pritchett
- Mikhail Shivlyakov
- Martins Licis (WSM, ASC & RI)
- Oleksii Novikov (WSM, WUS & RI)
- Tom Stoltman (WSM)
- JF Caron
- Maxime Boudreault
- Trey Mitchell (SC)
- Bobby Thompson
- Luke Stoltman
- Mitchell Hooper (WSM, ASC, RI & SMOE)
- Evan Singleton (SMOE)
- Lucas Hatton
- Rayno Nel (WSM)
- Thomas Evans
- Austin Andrade

Additionally, the following 53 strongmen have reached either 4th or 5th places of World's Strongest Man and/or World Muscle Power Classic and/or Arnold Strongman Classic and/or World's Ultimate Strongman and/or Rogue Invitational and or Strongest Man on Earth:

- Lou Ferrigno
- Franco Columbu
- Jon Kolb
- Gus Rethwisch
- Bishop Dolegiewicz
- Jerry Hannan
- Craig Wolfley
- Ernie Hackett
- Hamish Davidson
- Rudolph Kuester
- George Hechter
- Dan Markovic
- Jean-Pierre Brulois
- Tom Hawk
- László Fekete
- Adrian Smith
- Berend Veneberg
- Heinz Ollesch
- Pieter de Bruyn
- Martin Muhr
- Wayne Price
- Nathan Jones
- Bill Lyndon
- Johnny Perry
- Brian Bell
- Arvydas Pintinas
- Andy Bolton
- Steve Kirit
- Bill Pittuck
- Sami Heinonen
- Jarek Dymek
- Brian Schoonveld
- Odd Haugen
- Brian Siders
- Benedikt Magnússon
- Oleksandr Pekanov
- Mark Felix
- Tarmo Mitt
- Vidas Blekaitis
- Stefán Sölvi Pétursson
- Laurence Shahlaei
- Krzysztof Radzikowski
- Dimitar Savatinov
- Konstantine Janashia
- Matjaž Belšak
- Rauno Heinla
- Rob Kearney
- Mathew Ragg
- Tristain Hoath
- Paddy Haynes
- Bryce Johnson
- Pavlo Kordiyaka
- Ondřej Fojtů

==== International accolades ====
- The table below summarizes the most decorated strongmen in modern history with the most number of international wins in their careers. Entry criteria: a minimum of 5 international wins (1st places only) in open weight and age categories.

Active Retired

#	Name	Country	Active	Competitions	Wins	Win %
1	Žydrūnas Savickas	Lithuania	1996–2022	147	79	53.74%
2	Mariusz Pudzianowski	Poland	2000–2009	61	43	70.49%
3	Hafþór Júlíus Björnsson	Iceland	2010–	73	33	45.21%
4	Aivars Šmaukstelis	Latvia	2014–2025	86	28	32.56%
5	Brian Shaw	United States	2007–2023	65	27	41.54%
6	Krzysztof Radzikowski	Poland	2005–2019	112	24	21.43%
7	Ervin Katona	Serbia	2003–2015	117	23	19.66%
8	Matjaž Belšak	Slovenia	2014–2025	80	21	26.25%
9	Mitchell Hooper	Canada	2022–	32	18	56.25%
10	Hugo Girard	Canada	1998–2008	37	15	40.54%
11	Dainis Zageris	Latvia	2009–2022	87	15	17.24%
12	Riku Kiri	Finland	1986–1999	28	14	50.00%
13	Jón Páll Sigmarsson	Iceland	1982–1992	29	13	44.83%
14	Magnus Samuelsson	Sweden	1995–2008	64	13	20.31%
15	Jouko Ahola	Finland	1994–2003	25	12	48.00%
16	Mateusz Kieliszkowski	Poland	2014–	48	12	25.00%
17	Magnús Ver Magnússon	Iceland	1987–2005	55	12	21.82%
18	Oleksii Novikov	Ukraine	2016–	46	11	23.91%
19	Mikhail Koklyaev	Russia	2005–2014	50	11	22.00%
20	Rayno Nel	South Africa	2023–	16	10	62.50%
21	Svend Karlsen	Norway	1996–2006	69	10	14.49%
22	JF Caron	Canada	2007–2023	73	10	13.70%
23	Geoff Capes	England	1979–1988	20	9	45.00%
24	Čestmír Šíma	Czech Republic	2012–2021	26	9	34.62%
25	Bill Kazmaier	United States	1979–1990	18	8	44.44%
26	Derek Poundstone	United States	2006–2017	22	8	36.36%
27	Martins Licis	United States	2015–	27	8	29.63%
28	Vytautas Lalas	Lithuania	2007–2018	30	8	26.67%
29	Kelvin de Ruiter	Netherlands	2011–	46	8	17.39%
30	Janne Virtanen	Finland	1998–2009	50	8	16.00%
31	Kostyantyn Ilin	Ukraine	2007–2020	54	8	14.81%
32	Laurence Shahlaei	England	2007–2021	59	8	13.56%
33	Oskar Ziółkowski	Poland	2020–	25	7	28.00%
34	Evan Singleton	United States	2018–	37	7	18.92%
35	Travis Ortmayer	United States	2005–2023	51	7	13.73%
36	Manfred Hoeberl	Austria	1990–1996	18	6	33.33%
37	Adam Roszkowski	Poland	2021–	30	6	20.00%
38	Vasyl Virastyuk	Ukraine	2002–2008	28	6	21.43%
39	Didzis Zariņš	Latvia	2011–	32	6	18.75%
40	Pavlo Kordiyaka	Ukraine	2017–	38	6	15.79%
41	Andrus Murumets	Estonia	2003–2009	40	6	15.00%
42	Stojan Todorchev	Bulgaria	2005–2017	46	6	13.04%
43	Mikhail Shivlyakov	Russia	2011–2025	47	6	12.77%
44	Rauno Heinla	Estonia	2009–2025	66	6	9.09%
45	Luke Richardson	England	2019–	16	5	31.25%
46	Flemming Rasmussen	Denmark	1995–2001	19	5	26.32%
47	Mike Burke	United States	2011–2015	21	5	23.81%
48	Gerrit Badenhorst	South Africa	1992–2002	24	5	20.83%
49	Mykhailo Starov	Ukraine	2004–2006	24	5	20.83%
50	Juha-Matti Räsänen	Finland	1996–2006	26	5	19.23%
51	Gary Taylor	Wales	1990–1997	29	5	17.24%
52	Glenn Ross	Northern Ireland	1997–2011	36	5	13.89%
53	Johannes Årsjö	Sweden	2007–2017	39	5	12.82%
54	Trey Mitchell	United States	2016–	40	5	12.50%
55	Jamie Reeves	England	1988–1999	41	5	12.20%
56	Raivis Vidzis	Latvia	2002–2009	44	5	11.36%
57	Jarek Dymek	Poland	2000–2010	46	5	10.87%
58	Heinz Ollesch	Germany	1994–2006	49	5	10.20%
59	Jarno Hams	Netherlands	1999–2015	56	5	8.93%
60	Martin Wildauer	Austria	2008–2017	68	5	7.35%
61	Tarmo Mitt	Estonia	2001–2019	70	5	7.14%

- As of 24 October 2026

== Incorrect usage ==
Strongman is often incorrectly used to describe a person who does powerlifting, weightlifting or bodybuilding. Due to the circus and entertainment background, nineteenth-century bodybuilders were expected to mingle with the crowd during intermission and perform strength feats like card tearing, nail bending, etc. to demonstrate strength as well as symmetry and size.

== Strongwoman ==
The sport also extends to female competitors. From 2000s onwards, women's competitions were held internationally and from late 2010s, they received mainstream attention thanks to competitions such as World's Strongest Woman, Arnold Strongwoman Classic and Rogue Invitational.

== See also ==
- Strength athletics
- History of physical training and fitness
- List of strongmen
- List of strongman competitions
- Lifting stone
- Grip strength
- Power training
- Strength training
- Highland games
