= Ilkka Nummisto =

Finnish canoeist and strength athlete (1944–2019)

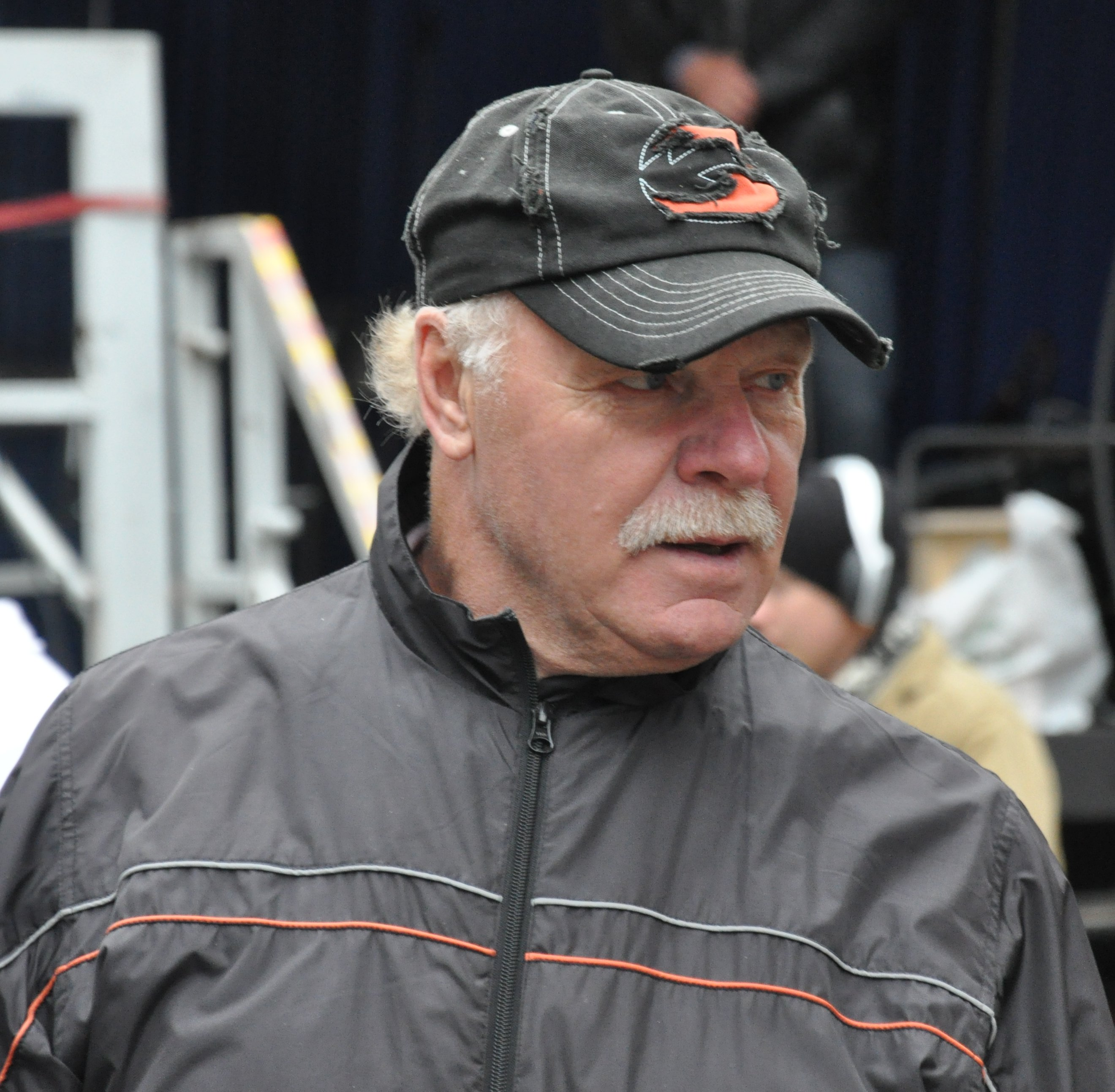

Personal information
- Nationality: (Finland) Finnish
- Born: April 24, 1944 Finland
- Died: June 29, 2019 (aged 75) Finland
- Occupations: Strongman, Canoeist
- Years active: 1964-1994
- Height: 186 cm (6 ft 1 in)
Medal record
Strongman
Representing Finland
World's Strongest Man
7th	1986 France
5th	1988 Hungary
6th	1989 Spain
3rd	1990 Finland
8th	1992 Iceland
World Muscle Power Classic
13th	1990 Scotland
Europe's Strongest Man
2nd	1992 Hungary
8th	1991 England
European Hercules
8th	1994 Oulu
Le Defi Mark Ten International
8th	1987 Montreal
Finland's Strongest Man
2nd	1989
2nd	1990
1st	1991
1st	1992

Ilkka Nummisto (April 24, 1944 – June 29, 2019) was a Finnish sprint canoer who competed from 1960s to 1970s and a Strongman who competed from 1980s to 1990s.

== Canoe racing ==
Competing in four Summer Olympics, Nummisto earned his best finish of fifth place in the K-4 1000 m event at Mexico City in 1968.

Event	Men's K-1 1000 metres	Men's K-4 1000 metres
(Japan) 1964 Tokyo	out in semifinals	-
1968 Mexico City	-	5th
(West Germany) 1972 Munich	9th	7th
(Canada) 1976 Montreal	-	out in repêchages

== Strongman ==
Nummisto's strongman career started with the World's Strongest Man competition where he appeared 5 times between 1986 and 1992, including a personal best third place behind Jón Páll Sigmarsson and O.D. Wilson at the 1990 World's Strongest Man competition held in Joensuu, Finland. He was the first man to lift all five McGlashen stones followed by Geoff Capes and Jón Páll Sigmarsson at the same event in 1986. At the age of 48, he became the oldest athlete ever to compete at the World's Strongest Man in his last appearance in 1992.

Nummisto also secured second place in 1992 Europe's Strongest Man competition behind László Fekete, and competed at international competitions like World Muscle Power Classic, Le Defi Mark Ten International and European Hercules. He was also 3 times Finland's Strongest Man champion in 1990, 1991 and 1992.

=== Personal records ===
- Hungarian farm cart deadlift – 480 kg (1,058 lb) (1988 World's Strongest Man)
- Back lift (boat) – 925 kg (2,039 lb) (1990 World's Strongest Man)
- McGlashen Stone loading – 5 stones ranging from 95–140 kg (209–309 lb) on top of 5 distant whiskey barrels in 63.12 seconds (1986 World's Strongest Man)

→ First man in history to load 5 McGlashen stones arranged in sequential order

- Weight over bar – 25.5 kg (56 lb) over 5.30 metres (17 ft 5 in) (1992 Europe's Strongest Man)
- Sack carry – 110 kg (243 lb) and 100 kg (220 lb) for 100m course in 26.02 seconds (1992 Europe's Strongest Man) (World Record)
