= Highlander Challenge World Championships =

Highland games and athletics tournament

Highlander Challenge / Highlander Challenge World Championships
- The official logo of the Highlander Challenge

Tournament information
- Location: Last held at Glenarm Castle, Northern Ireland
- Month played: July
- Established: 2007
- Format: Multi-event competition

Current champion
- (Scotland) Gregor Edmunds

The Highlander Challenge World Championships (or more simply the Highlander Challenge or Gododdin Highlander Challenge) is a tournament that marries traditional Highland games with more contemporary strength athletics. It was created to help reinvigorate Highland games in Scotland by giving a modern and aspirational image while maintaining the tradition inherent in the history of the sport.

== History ==
Highland games has a long and distinguished history in Scotland. It was once claimed to be the biggest spectator sport in the country after football and as a format has been exported around the globe. In particular, it has been very successful in North America. However, in its native land, some well-informed commentators began to note that it was attracting small crowds, the format was deemed tired and the number of traditional heavy competitors was dwindling at once well-attended gatherings.

Douglas Edmunds, the co-founder of the World's Strongest Man, but more pertinently a former world caber-tossing champion, determined to reinvigorate the sport in his native Scotland. Along with his son, Gregor Edmunds the 2007 winner of the World Highland Games Championships, he set about organizing a new competition that would attract some of the top names from the world from such disciplines as Highland games, strength athletics, powerlifting, and field athletics. He said "Gimmicky strength events, like truck-pulling, we feel are inappropriate when Scotland has such a magnificent history .... Sadly, some games have poor quality athletes, bad equipment, and poor quality commentary with little crowd interaction. We aim to change that."

Thus was spawned the Highland Challenge. Invitees to the tournament had to meet high criteria, being either national champions, Olympians, world record-holders, World Highland Games champions, World's Strongest Man finalists, and US Highland Games champions. Having brought the earth of their homelands to the Moot Hill, in the same manner and place as allegiance was sworn to Scotland's ancient kings, contestants would enter a competition consisting of a mixture of traditional Highland games events and more contemporary strongman tests in order to vie for the title of the "Chieftain's Champion".

The 2007 event saw Sebastian Wenta win the competition and having sampled some success the next games were planned for 2008. Douglas Edmunds managed to attract a number of sponsors for the 2008 event, as well as gaining an agreement with Channel 4 to televise the event. The 2008 event took place at Scone on 19 and 20 July 2008. Such was its success that a 2009 event was planned for immediately.

== Events ==
The events contested are designed to echo not only the traditions of the Highland games but also the history of Scotland. They include wrestling, schiltron jousting, and stone-lifting, as well as traditional throws, such as the caber. In addition, there are re-enactments of battles including in 2008 the 1396 Battle of the North Inch starring Hal o' the Wynd.

In the 2008 contest. a new event called the "whisky plunder" (sponsored by Famous Grouse) saw competitors racing with four casks. Famous Grouse also sponsored the tossing the caber event, with winners toasting success with a Famous Grouse trophy and a personalised Gallon Bottle.

== Past winners ==
Year	Champion	Location
2007	(Poland) Sebastian Wenta	Blair Castle, Blair Atholl, Scotland
2008	(Poland) Sebastian Wenta	Scone Palace, Scotland
2009	(Poland) Sebastian Wenta	Glenarm Castle, Northern Ireland
2011	(Scotland) Gregor Edmunds	Glenarm Castle, Northern Ireland

=== Final ===
The Highlander Challenge was to begin on 26 May 2007 at Blair Castle, Scotland. The games made up two half-hour episodes of the IFSA Strongman 26 programme television series. The event was also backed by Event Scotland and was conceived by Douglas Edmunds. It went by the name "Gododdin Challenge" in 2007. Sebastian Wenta edged out Gregor Edmunds by one-half-point for the victory at the Gododdin Challenge at Blair Castle. Hjalti Arnason who watched the contest commented that this made for TV event would result in excellent shows and Mike Zolkiewicz, who finished fourth said that the blend of traditional Highland games and strongman events "had great balance and it tested athletic ability beyond just a Highland games or a strongman contest."

The final placings were:

#	Name	Nationality
1	Sebastian Wenta	Poland
2	Gregor Edmunds	Scotland
3	Kyrllo Chuprinin	Ukraine
4	Mike Zolkiewicz	United States

== 2008 Event ==
The 2008 finals were on 19 and 20 July at Scone Palace. They were televised by Channel 4 and the announcer was Colin Bryce, an announcer on the World's Strongest Man as well as a past competitor.

=== Competitors ===
Name	Nationality	Background Achievements	Other notes
Kyrllo Chuprinin	Ukraine	Current national discus champion and Olympian	
Stefan Solvi Petursson	Iceland	Iceland's Strongest Man	
Mike Zolkiewicz	United States	3 time all American discus Champion	
Johannes Arsjo	Sweden		Not in original programme
Sebastian Wenta	Poland	Current Highlander Champion, runner-up World Strongest Man	
Wout Zijlstra	Netherlands	World record holder in weight over bar	
Neil Elliot	Scotland		
Mark Felix	Grenada		Not in original programme
Gregor Edmunds	Scotland	Current World Highland Games Champion	
Scott Rider	England	Winner national shot put championship. current Braemar Highland Games and Olympic Games bobsledder.	
Sean Betz	United States		Not in original programme
David Barron	United States	Runner-up World Highland Games Championship	
Lukasz Wenta	Poland		Not in original programme
Dariusz Slowik	Canada	Discus thrower – 2nd Commonwealth Games; 3rd in Pan American Games	Not in original programme
Larry Brock	United States	Current US Highland Games Champion	
Aaron Neighbour	Australia	Former Australian Discus Champion	Not in original programme

There were also a number of competitors who had been advertised as entrants but for a variety of reasons had to pull out:

Name	Nationality	Background Achievements	Other notes
Ryan Vierra	United States of America	5-time World Highland Games Champion	On programme but did not compete
Gunner Pfingsten	Germany	Runner-up European shot put Championship	On programme but did not compete
Carl Myerscough	England	British record holder in shot put	On programme but did not compete
Geoff Dollan	Canada	Canada's Strongest Man	On programme but did not compete
Terry Hollands	England	2007 Britain's Strongest Man; 3rd place in 2007 World’s Strongest Man	On programme but did not compete
Garret Johnston	United States of America	All American shot and discus Champion	On programme but did not compete
Mikhail Koklyaev	Russia	6 time Russian weightlifting Champion and record holder; 2 time runner-up IFSA Strongman World Championships; 3rd place in 2010 World’s Strongest Man	On programme but did not compete
Saemunder Saemundsson	Iceland	Icelandic Highland games record holder	On programme but did not compete
Craig Sinclair	Scotland	Scottish Junior Champion	Advertised on Ironmind website as a contestant but did not compete

=== Heat 1 ===
The competitors in the first heat were:

#	Name	Nationality	Qualified for Final?
1	Kyrllo Chuprinin	Ukraine	Q
2	Stefan Solvi Petursson	Iceland	DNQ
3	Mike Zolkiewicz	United States	DNQ
4	Johannes Arsjo not in programme	Sweden	Q
5	Sebastian Wenta	Poland	Q
6	Wout Zijlstra	Netherlands	Q
7	Neil Elliot	Scotland	DNQ
8	Mark Felix not in programme	Grenada	DNQ

Chuprynin and Wenta dominated. Johannes Arsjo, in his first appearance in a Highland event won the whisky plunder (a 320-kg barrel carry) in a time of 14.28 seconds and overcame heavier and more experienced competitors to win the wrestling bouts.

=== Heat 2 ===
The competitors in the second heat were:

#	Name	Nationality	Qualified for Final?
1	Gregor Edmunds	Scotland	Q
2	Scott Rider	England	Q
3	Sean Betz not in programme	United States	Q
4	David Barron	United States	Q
5	Lukasz Wenta not in programme	Poland	DNQ
6	D. Slowik not in programme	Canada	DNQ
7	Larry Brock	United States	DNQ
8	Aaron Neighbour not in programme	Australia	DNQ

Scott Rider was the overall winner, with winning throws in the stone putt and caber. David Barron winning the sheaf pitch and Sean Betz won the hammer with a throw of 139' 8½”.

=== Final ===
Sean Betz won both the hammer and 28-lb weight for distance. Zijlstra won the Famous Grouse Challenge Caber and Arsjo beat Rider in the pole push. The 56-lb weight over bar saw no-one reach 17' and was a three-way tie for first place between Arsjo, Wenta and Zijlstra. Going into the final event of the Pictish stone carry, Wenta had a 3-point lead over his closest challenger, Rider, but retained his title with by gaining a third place behind Edmunds and Arsjo.

The final placings were:

#	Name	Nationality
1	Sebastian Wenta	Poland
2	Scott Rider	England
3	Gregor Edmunds	Scotland
4=	Johannes Arsjo	Sweden
4=	Wout Zijlstra	Netherlands
6	Sean Betz	United States
7	Kyrllo Chuprinin	Ukraine
8	David Barron	United States

== 2009 Event ==
The 2009 finals were on 14 and 15 July 2009 at Glenarm Castle. The event was sponsored by Met-Rx. The event was overseen by the Earl of Antrim, who gave away the Devastator trophy.

#	Name	Nationality
1	Sebastian Wenta	Poland
2	Kyrllo Chuprinin	Ukraine
3	Scott Rider	England
4	Wout Zijlstra	Netherlands
5	Aaron Neighbour	Australia

== 2011 event ==
The finals of the 2011 Highlander Challenge took place on 17 & 18 June 2011 at Glenarm Castle in Northern Ireland.

#	Name	Nationality
1	Gregor Edmunds	Scotland
2	Sebastian Wenta	Poland
3	Scott Rider	England
4	Mike Zolkiewicz	United States
5=	Hans Lolkema	Netherlands
5=	Neil Elliot	Scotland
7	Oskars Brugemanis	Latvia
8	Vytautas Lalas	Lithuania
9	Gary Hagen	Scotland
10	Jonathan Kelly	(Republic of Ireland) Ireland
