= O.D. Wilson =

American strongman and powerlifter (1954-1991)

- Born: September 12, 1954; Winter Haven, Florida, U.S.
- Died: October 29, 1991 (aged 37); U.S.
- Other name: "Nightmare"
- Occupations: Strongman; powerlifter
- Years active: 1985–1991 (his death)
- Height: 6 ft 5-1/2 in (1.97 m)
- Title: IPF World Powerlifting Champion
- Children: 3

Competition record

Strongman

Representing United States

World's Strongest Man
2nd	1990 World's Strongest Man
5th	1991 World's Strongest Man

World Strongman Challenge
3rd	1989
2nd	1991

European Hercules
4th	1991

Pure Strength
2nd	1989 w/Bill Kazmaier
1st	1990 w/Bill Kazmaier

Powerlifting

Representing United States

IPF World Powerlifting Championships
1st	1988	+125 kg

USPF National Powerlifting Championships
3rd	1987	+125 kg
1st	1988	+125 kg

Oders Dell Wilson Jr. (September 12, 1954 – October 29, 1991) was an American powerlifter and a strongman. He was known by the nickname "the Nightmare", mainly due to his size.

Several strength analysts and historians regard Wilson as the strongest athlete to have never won World's Strongest Man title.

== Early life ==
Wilson was battered as a child by his father. During his childhood he was a track and field athletes specialized in the 200 m dash, and a basketball player. He worked as a farmhand which helped him developed strength and after graduation, helped neighborhood crime watch program. He enrolled in the military and served for 12 years, eight of which were spent overseas in Germany, Japan, and Korea and also engaged in racquetball and boxing for a couple of years. In 1981, he started lifting weights.

When Wilson was not competing, he was a security guard and a bodyguard to various celebrities, including Michael Jackson and Janet Jackson.

== Career ==
Wilson came close to being the first American since Bill Kazmaier to win the World's Strongest Man title in 1990. Leading the competition with five and a half points before the last event, a 200m race with a 100 kg weight on the back. Wilson lacked the endurance and running speed to complete the course and ended up losing by half a point to Jón Páll Sigmarsson in the overall competition. Wilson vowed to win the 1991 World's Strongest Man title, but a back injury sustained just before the competition, a prolapsed disc, hampered his performance. Wilson would finish in fifth place.

Wilson was a successful powerlifter. He was a five-time U.S. Services champion and a five-time U.S. Army titleholder. He won the 1988 USPF National Super Heavyweight Powerlifting title, as well as the 1988 IPF World Powerlifting Championships. Some of Wilson's training partners were also notable World's Strongest Man competitors including Rick "Grizzly" Brown, Bill Kazmaier and James Perry, who competed in the 1992 World's Strongest Man.

Wilson set multiple world records throughout his career; at the 1989 USPF Armed Forces Championships he squatted 1,002 lb (454.5 kg), bench pressed 552 lb (250.4 kg), and deadlifted 876 lb (397.3 kg) for a then all-time total record of 2,430 lb (1,102.2 kg) in single ply equipment. Wilson's weight at that meet was measured at 399 lb (181.0 kg). It is believed that he had one of the biggest ever quadriceps, measuring upwards of 36 inches. Wilson's shoe size was 18 and his ring size was 26, while the ring size for the average adult male is between 10 and 12.

Wilson also appeared in a 1989 science fiction action film Cyborg featuring Jean-Claude Van Damme. He is considered by many to be the strongest man to never win the World's Strongest Man contest, along with Riku Kiri and Derek Poundstone.

== Death ==
On October 29, 1991, while being interviewed on a radio program just a few weeks after the 1991 World's Strongest Man competition, Wilson complained of chest pains and went outside for some fresh air. Within moments, he collapsed and died of cardiac arrest. He was 37 years old.

== Personal records ==
Powerlifting

- Squat – 1,002 lb (454.5 kg) single-ply equipment
- Bench Press – 566.5 lb (257.0 kg) single-ply equipment
- Deadlift – 876 lb (397.3 kg) single-ply equipment
- Total – 2,430 lb (1,102.2 kg) (1,002 + 552 + 876 lb (454.5 + 250.4 + 397.3 kg)) single-ply equipment

→ former all-time world record in super heavyweight class (regardless of weight class)

Strongman

- Duck walk – 181.5 kg (400 lb) for 50m course in 21.12 seconds (1989 World Strongman Challenge) (world record)
- Natural Stone press – 120 kg (265 lb) (1990 World's Strongest Man)
- Weight over bar – 25.5 kg (56 lb) over 4.90 metres (16 ft 1 in) (1991 World Viking Challenge)
- Scottish hammer throw – 15 kg (33 lb) super-heavy hammer for 25.98 metres (85 ft 3 in) (1991 World Viking Challenge)
