= Peter Tregloan =

British strongman and powerlifter

Personal information
- Born: 18 October 1957 (age 68) Redruth, England
- Occupations: Powerlifter, Strongman / Highland Games retired from lifting 2002
- Height: 6 ft 5 in (1.96 m)
- Weight: 24 st (340 lb; 150 kg)

Sport
- Country: United Kingdom
- Retired: 2002

Achievements and titles
- World finals: 9
- Personal bests: 457.5 kg squat world masters records. 275 kg bench, 402.5 kg dead lift Total 1072.5

Peter Tregloan (born 18 October 1957 - 20 November 2025) is a British former strongman and powerlifter. He has won a number of titles including nine world championships in powerlifting and is the current world record holder in squat, deadlift and total weight for the masters age class.

Competition record

Strongman

Representing Jersey

Britain's Strongest Man
3rd	1988

Powerlifting

IPF World Championships
4th	1988

EPF European Championships
2nd	1989

WPC World Championships
2nd	1990 in Italy at World Championships
1st	1991 1992 1993 1994 Las Vegas WPC Eorlds 1991, 1992 Stone England, 1993 Macon France, 1994 Columbus Ohio
1st	1996 1998 1996 Durban S.A., 1998 Graz Austria
3rd	2001 open, 1st masters Captown S.A.
1st	2002
1st	2002	Masters

== Early life ==
Peter Tregloan was born in 1957 in Cornwall and grew up on family farm near Wendron. As a sportsman his early interests were Judo national champion and Rugby union Played for St Ives and Exeter. He went on to become a Professional wrestler and from the mid-eighties became a prominent Strongman and powerlifter, having taken up powerlifting in 1985. On the international stage his greatest sporting accolades have been associated with powerlifting and he is a nine times World Super heavyweight powerlifting Champion, with a number of world records to his name. For a number of years he competed within the ranks of the International Powerlifting Federation ("IPF") and its European arm the EPF, in the open (or over 125 kg) category. In 1987 he placed seventh in the world championships in Fredrikstad, Norway. The following year in Murnau, Germany he was sixth in the European Championships, but came fourth in the World Championships that year in Perth, Australia. Improving his total by 20 kg in the following world championships in Canada was to no avail due to a disqualification, but a 907.5 kg total in the 1989 Europeans in Lahti, Finland led to a silver medal. He moved federations in 1990 to the World Powerlifting Congress and came second to Gerrit Badenhorst in the 1990 World Championships in Pescara. He continued to improve and 1991 won first world title in Las Vegas, 1992 won worlds in Stone England, 1993 won Worlds in Macon France, 1994 won Worlds in Columbus Ohio, Won Worlds in by 1996 lifted a total of 1057.5 kg to take the world title in Durban. In 2001 was injured lifted with torn right triceps advised not to lift but did and was asked to lift in the open bad bench press due to triceps tear led to a third-place finish in Open and first As a Master in Cape Town although in December of that year in Amberg, World Cup he set the world record for the Masters age category in Deadlift, Squat and Total. He returned to form in 2002 in Helsinki, where he won both the open and masters world championships then a month later lifted in World Cup in Innsbruck Austria won class and was best overall lifter of all weight classes, also set new world record in squat 457.5 kg and total 1072.5 kg

As a strongman, the height of his fame was in the late 1980s. In 1988 in the John Smith's Trial of Strength, regard as that year's Britain's Strongest Man, Peter came third behind Jamie Reeves. 1989 Britains Strongest Man in Scotland came 3rd to Jamie Reeves. Represented GB in Le Defi Mark Ten, this was the classed as Worlds Strongest man in 1986 came 7th in first international, following year took world record of Jón Páll Sigmarsson at Le Defi Mark Ten 1987. Represented GB many times in different countries. Won Bournemouth International Strongman beating Jón Páll current World champion, Bill Kaz past 3 times world champion, Jamie Reeves 2 times World champion.

== Life after sport ==
On the non-competitive side of powerlifting, Tregloan became an international referee 1991. He became European President of the World Powerlifting Congress in 1999 during a time of struggle for the WPC Europe. In 2003 he became the World WPC President. In 2004 the WPC became the Global Powerlifting Committee due to Ian Morris and Tregloan having to go to court over the old name. Peter has since become a therapist in human and equine therapy work although he remains involved in powerlifting as the president of the Global Powerlifting Committee ("GPC") of Great Britain, Europe and the World.

He moved into healing as a professional because of his extensive contact with therapists due to his many different injuries acquired over his sporting career. During that time he has said that he was told he had a natural gift for helping people with bad backs and other such ailments, using techniques learned from his old judo master who trained in Japan for many year and he learnt the healing side of Judo. However, in order to become a therapist full-time he began to train and he has completed over 100 courses since 2000. He has since become a member of a number of bodies including: the Federation of Holistic Therapists, the American Craniosacral therapy Association, the CranioSacral Society; the Process Acupressure Association; and the Zero Balancing Association UK. He opened the Kernowyon for One and All, Zhuang Dan Centre in St Helier, Jersey. in order to practice. Since holds clinics in Guernsey, South West England, and Denmark. Of his teachers he cited Process Acupressure founder Aminah Raheem, and Dr Fritz Smith (founder of Zero Balancing) as two of his mentors. In his day-to-day work he uses a combination of John Upledger's form CranioSacral Therapy, SamatoEmotional Release, Process Acupressure, Basic Acupressure, Viscera Manipulation, Neural Manipulation, Manual Articular Approach plus a few others
