= Jean-Pierre Brulois =

French powerlifter, strongman and Olympic weightlifter

Personal information
- Born: 18 April 1957 (age 69) Lille, France
- Occupation(s): powerlifter, Strongman, Olympic Weightlifting
- Height: 6 ft 0 in (1.83 m)
Medal record
Powerlifting
Representing France
IPF World Championships
7th	1981	125kg
3rd	1983	125kg
2nd	1984	125kg
6th	1986	+125kg
5th	1988	+125kg
2nd	1989	+125kg
3rd	1988	+125kg
1st	1990	+125kg
IPF World Games
3rd	1989	+125kg
IPF World Bench Press Championships
EPF European Championships
4th	1983	125
3rd	1988	+125kg
1st	1989	+125kg
1st	1990	+125kg
Strongman
Representing France
World's Strongest Man
8th	1985 World's Strongest Man
5th	1986 World's Strongest Man
7th	1988 World's Strongest Man
Men's Weightlifting
Representing France
French Weightlifting Championships
1st	1973	Cadet
1st	1974	Junior

Jean-Pierre Brulois (born 18 April 1957) is a former world champion powerlifter, strongman and Olympic Weightlifter from France

== Strength sports ==
Jean-Pierre is best known for winning the 1990 IPF World Powerlifting Champion title in The Hague, Netherlands. A former Junior record holder in Olympic weightlifting, he also competed in four World Strongest Man contests: 1985, 1986, 1988, and 1992, finishing 8th in 1985, 5th in 1986, and 7th in 1988.

Overall, Jean-Pierre Brulois is arguably the strongest Frenchman whose feats have ever been officially verified (along with Louis Uni and Charles Rigoulot).

== Personal life ==
In a 2005 article, Jean-Pierre Brulois explained to French strength sports specialist Emmanuel Legeard that, as a young boy, he was haunted by a recurring nightmare in which he was being crushed by a truck; weight training had helped him overcome this complex. Jean-Pierre started Olympic lifting at age 14. As a cadet (16 year old), and then again as a junior weightlifter (17 year old), he broke the French records in both the snatch and the clean and jerk, but was then called to fulfill the military service required at the time of all 18-year-old French males.

On his return from the military, he was contacted by Serge Nubret who persuaded him to leave Olympic Weightlifting for Powerlifting. In the mid-1980s, Jean-Pierre met with Marc Vouillot, a renowned Powerlifting coach, who instantly understood his athletic potential and started training him. In 1990, he was crowned super heavyweight World champion of the International Powerlifting Federation. He retired soon after for professional, as well as familial reasons. In 1990, Harry Kümel proposed him for the role of Hercules in Michel Boisrond's "Hercule aux pieds d'Omphale" ("Hercules at the Feet of Omphale").

== Powerlifting Records ==
- Squat - 402,5 kg "raw" (IPF World Championships of 1990, cat. +125 kg)
- Bench Press - 250 kg "raw" (Coupe des Flandres, 1991, cat. +125)
- Deadlift - 340 kg "raw" (National championships, Federation Française de Force, cat. 125 kg)
- Powerlifting Total - 972,5 kg

== Notable Records in Olympic Weightlifting ==
- Snatch - 120 kg (French national Cadet record at age 16)
- Clean and Jerk - 150 kg (French national Cadet record at age 16)

== Personal Records ==
- Snatch - 150 kg
- Clean and Jerk - 180 kg

== World's Strongest Man results ==
- 1985 World's Strongest Man - 8th
- 1986 World's Strongest Man - 5th
- 1988 World's Strongest Man - 7th

=== Filmography ===
- Hercule aux pieds d'Omphale as Hercules (1990)
- La Totale! as a villain (1991)
