= Jamie Reeves =

British strongman (born 1962)

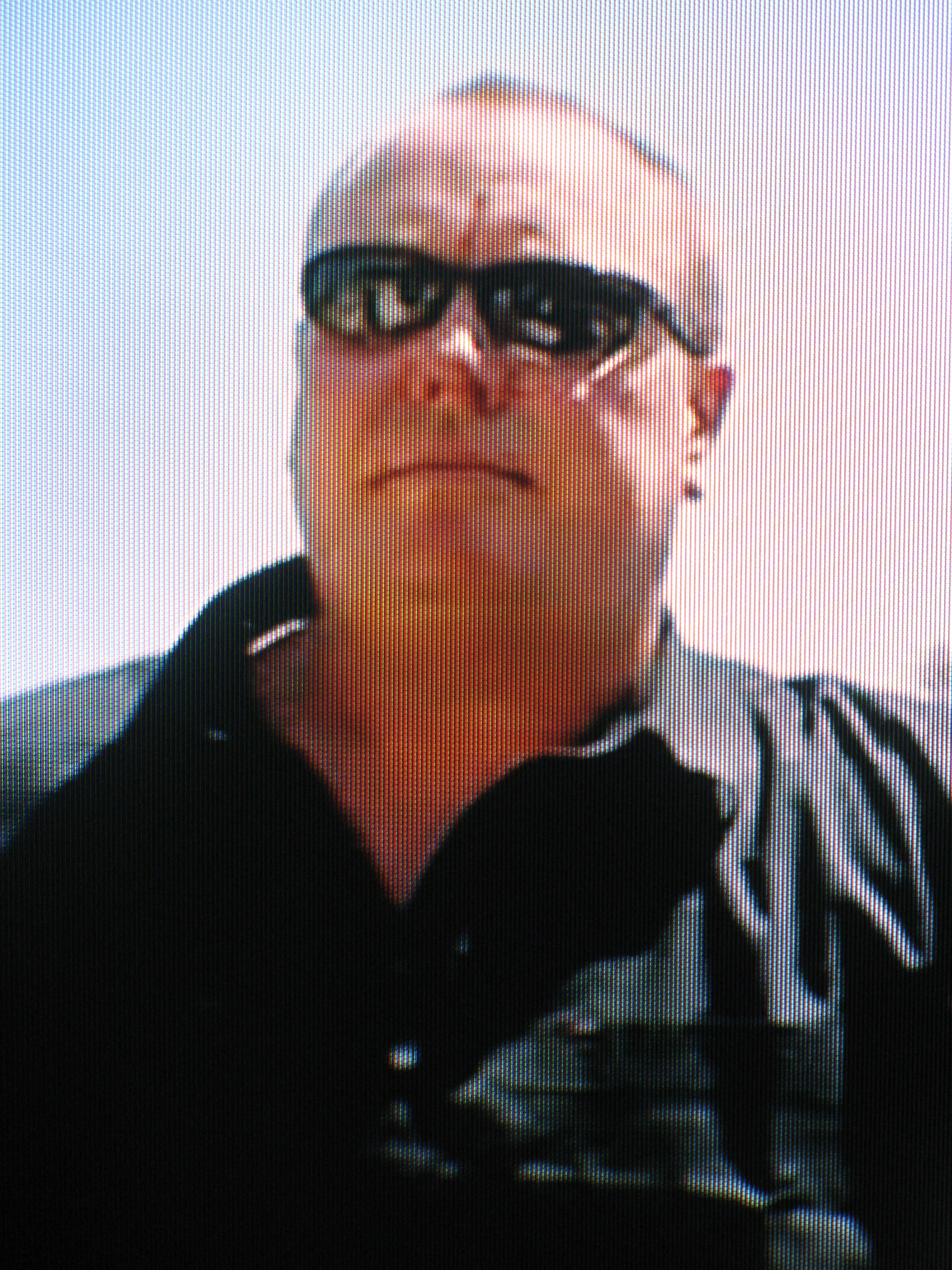

Personal information
- Born: 3 May 1962 (age 64) Sheffield, England
- Height: 190 cm (6 ft 3 in)
- Weight: 150 kg (331 lb)
Medal record
Strongman
Representing Great Britain
World's Strongest Man
| 3rd | 1988 World's Strongest Man |
| 1st | 1989 World's Strongest Man |
| 2nd | 1992 World's Strongest Man (joint with Magnús Ver Magnússon) |
Pure Strength
| 2nd | 1988 w/Mark Higgins |
| 3rd | 1989 w/Mark Higgins |
Representing England
World Muscle Power Championships
| 2nd | 1989 World Muscle Power Champs |
| 2nd | 1991 World Muscle Power Champs |
| 1st | 1992 World Muscle Power Champs |
| 1st | 2000 World Muscle Power Champs |
World Strongman Challenge
| 1st | 1992 |
| 3rd | 1993 |
| 3rd | 1998 |
World's Strongest Team
| 1st | 1995 |
| 4th | 1997 |
European Muscle Power Championships
| 1st | 1991 |
| 1st | 1992 |
Britain's Strongest Man
| 1st | 1988 |
| 1st | 1989 |
| 1st | 1992 |
| 1st | 1998 |
England's Strongest Man
| 1st | 1987 |
| 1st | 1988 |
| 1st | 1989 |
| 1st | 1992 |
| 1st | 1993 |
| 1st | 1994 |
| 1st | 1995 |
| 1st | 1996 |
| 1st | 1997 |
World Mighty Man
| 1st | 1992 |
| 3rd | 1993 |
Europe's Strongest Man
| 1st | 1988 |
| 1st | 1989 |
Battle of the Giants
| 3rd | 1989 |
European Hercules
| 2nd | 1991 |
| 3rd | 1996 |
Other Grand Prix & Internationals
| 2nd | Hresysti 1991 |
| 2nd | Kraftur Tournament 1989 |
| 1st | Lithuania Grand Prix (IFSA) 1998 |
British Muscle Power Championship
| 1st | 1994 |
| 1st | 1996 |
National Truck Pulling Championships
| 1st | (ASA/Bristol Street Motors) 1986 |

Jamie Reeves (born 3 May 1962) is a British former coal miner, strongman and professional wrestler. As a strongman, he won the 1989 World's Strongest Man, was World Muscle Power champion, and also had numerous other titles including Europe's Strongest Man and Britain's Strongest Man. Following retirement from competitive sport he continued to be involved in strength athletics as a referee, event promoter and coach.

== Early life ==
Reeves was born in 1962 in Sheffield, Yorkshire. He grew up in the city and went to the City School. At school he had been a swimmer at county level, a centre-forward for his football team and had also played as Number 8 in the rugby union side that won the under-15 Yorkshire Cup. He went on to become a colliery blacksmith's welder before his success as a strongman led him to give up that profession.

== Strongman ==
When Reeves saw Bill Kazmaier win his third World's Strongest Man title in 1982, on BBC television, he decided that would be his aim, and took up weights. By 1986 he had become the Yorkshire and North East powerlifting champion in the superheavy class. In addition to powerlifting he had become actively involved in strength athletics and in 1986 won the National Truck Pulling Championships (sponsored by ASA/Bristol Street Motors) and came second to Peter Tregloan in 1986 in the Midland's Strongest Man competition. In 1987 he improved on his second-place finish by winning the Midland's Strongest Man (the first of three consecutive wins). That year he also won the first of three consecutive Yorkshire's Strongest Man competitions and won the England's Strongest Man competition also. In 1988 he took the title of East Britain's Strongest Man and entered John Smith's Trial of Strength, a competition organised by Geoff Capes and David Webster in order to find the successor to the retired Capes. He won the title, the equivalent that year of Britain's Strongest Man. Underlining his calibre, he then broke Thomas Topham's 274-year-old record by harness lifting three beer barrels weighing a total of 845 kg.

This performances culminated in an invitation to the 1988 World's Strongest Man where he finished third on his first attempt, to Jón Páll Sigmarsson and Bill Kazmaier. The following year he won the competition in San Sebastián again excelling in gripping events, seen as his speciality. He was injured for the next two competitions and on his return in 1992 came second equal with Magnús Ver Magnússon. Domestically, he won the British Muscle Power Championships and Britain's Strongest Man on numerous occasions and in total was nine times England's Strongest Man.

== Personal records ==
=== Powerlifting ===
- Squat (Raw) – 362.5 kg (799 lb) (IPF)
- Bench press – 272.5 kg (601 lb) (1994 WPC Push-Pull exhibition)
- Deadlift (Raw) – 367.5 kg (810 lb) (IPF)
- Total – 940 kg (2,072 lb) (345 + 240 + 360 kg (761 + 529 + 794 lb)) (2000 BAWLA British Men's Powerlifting Championships)

=== Strongman ===
- Log lift (with vintage irregular V.2 log) – 180 kg (397 lb) (1992 World Mighty Man) (World Record)
- Keg toss – 20 kg (44 lb) over 5.00 metres (16 ft 5 in) (1997 European Open)
- Caber over bar – 35 kg (77 lb) over 6.00 metres (19 ft 8 in) (2000 World Muscle Power Classic) (Joint-World Record)

== Retirement ==
After retiring from strength sports, Jamie became an International Federation of Strength Athletes judge, and ran his own gym.

== Statistics ==
- Height: 6 ft 3 in (190.5 cm)
- Weight: 322 lb (146 kg).
- BMI: 40.2
- Chest: 60 inches
- Biceps: 22 inches
