= Allan Crossley =

British strength athlete (1952–2023)

- Born: Allan Crossley; 1952; Coleraine, Northern Ireland
- Died: June 2023 (aged 70–71)
- Occupation(s): Doorman, Minder, Strongman

Competition record

Strongman

Representing Great Britain

Europe's Strongest Man
| Qualified | 1983 Europe's Strongest Man | |

Britain's Strongest Man
| 4th | Britain's Strongest Man 1980 | |
| 4th | Britain's Strongest Man 1983 | |
| 1st | Britain's Strongest Man 1984 | |

Allan Crossley (1952 – June 2023) was a British stronger strongman competitor, notable for having won the title of Britain's Strongest Man, as well as having been both the British light-heavy and heavyweight arm wrestling champion.

== Biography ==
Allan Crossley was born in Coleraine, Northern Ireland in 1952. He trained in a number of gyms as a teenager and went on to become a professional bouncer and a doorman. As a sportsman he first made his name as an arm wrestler, winning the British light-heavyweight title and going on to win the British heavyweight title, (However he did lose in an exhibition arm wrestle to champion boxer David Pearce in 1984 in Bristol). He then entered the world of strength athletics. In Britain's Strongest Man he came fourth in the 1980 and 1983 versions of the event, before winning the title in 1984. This enabled Crossley to qualify for the 1984 Europe's Strongest Man in which he represented the United Kingdom alongside Geoff Capes, the then current World's Strongest Man.

As a doorman he gained significant renown. He was featured in a 1989 episode of the BBC Bristol series 10x10, entitled Hardman. He was later featured as one of the three British bouncers including, Lenny McLean and John 'The Neck' Houchin, in Steven Cantor's film Bounce: Beyond the Velvet Rope, in which his portrayal has been described as "a soft spoken professed Christian, who can quote Shakespeare whenever the mood takes him, but who prefers handling obnoxious customers in their most pliable state - knocked unconscious".

Crossley lived in Tufnell Park, London, and spent much time at the Highgate Men's Ponds. He died in June 2023.

| Preceded by Geoff Capes | Britain's Strongest Man; 1984 | Succeeded by Pete Tancred |
