= 1986 World's Strongest Man =

Strongman competition in 1986

Competition information
- Dates: 19-21 November 1986
- Location: Nice
- Country: France
- Athletes participating: 8
- Nations participating: 8

Champion(s)
- (Iceland) Jón Páll Sigmarsson

The 1986 World's Strongest Man was the tenth edition of World's Strongest Man and was won by Jón Páll Sigmarsson from Iceland. It was his second title after finishing second the previous year. 1983 and 1985 champion Geoff Capes from the United Kingdom finished second and, Ab Wolders from the Netherlands finished third. The contest was held at Nice, France.

== Final results ==
#	Name<	Nationality	1.Truck Pull	2.Sack Race	3.Stones of Strength	4.Car Turnover	5.Champagne Hold	6.Tug of War	7.Boat Lift	8.Barrel Loading	Pts
1	Jon Pall Sigmarsson	Iceland	7	8	8	6	7	7	8	8	59
2	Geoff Capes	United Kingdom	8	7	7	8	3	8	7	7	55
3	Ab Wolders	Netherlands	4	5	5	7	4	2	5.5	5	37.5
4	Dan Markovic	Canada	3	4	3	5	5	4	4	6	34
5	Jean-Pierre Brulois	France	2	3	2	4	6	5	5.5	4	31.5
6	Klaus Wallas	Austria	5	2	4	3	2	6	DNF	DNS	22
7	Ilkka Nummisto	Finland	6	6	6	DNF	1	DNS	DNS	DNS	19 (injured)
8	Rick "Grizzly" Brown	United States	1	1	1	DNF	8	3	DNS	DNS	14 (injured)

Preceded by 1985 World's Strongest Man	1986 World's Strongest Man	Succeeded by Not Held
