= Rick "Grizzly" Brown =

American powerlifter (1960–2002)

Personal information
- Nationality: (United States) American
- Born: Rick Brown; April 4, 1960 Berkeley, California, United States
- Died: January 2, 2002 (aged 41) Berkeley, California, United States
- Occupation: Strongman
- Height: 180 cm (5 ft 11 in)
- Children: 3
Medal record
Strongman
Representing United States
World's Strongest Man
6th	1985 World's Strongest Man
8th	1986 World's Strongest Man

Rick "Grizzly" Brown (April 4, 1960 – January 2, 2002) was an American powerlifter, strength athlete and professional Strongman competitor from Berkeley, California.

== Biography ==
Brown was best known for competing in the 1985 and 1986 World's Strongest Man competitions. He competed in amateur wrestling and powerlifting at age 15, and after winning a national wrestling title in 1981, focused on strength training. Brown held a place in the Guinness Book of World Records for the largest biceps, over 25 inches (cold, not pumped). After retiring from the sport of strongman in 1987, he secured a position with the Berkeley Unified School District as a campus monitor and later a school safety officer where he served as a mentor, as a youth counselor on drug abuse and father figure to hundreds of students first at Berkeley High School in 1987. Brown claimed to have never used steroids to aid muscular development. In 1989 he transferred to Willard Middle School, where he served students and the school community for eleven years. In 1991, he began his study of Islam and later converted. In 1994, he met his wife, Jennifer, at Willard Middle School where they were both employed; in 1997 they joined in marriage at the "Wedding Court" at Willard Middle School. Brown trained with fellow strongmen competitors O.D. Wilson and Bill Kazmaier.

Brown died on January 2, 2002, in Berkeley, California, aged 41 and survived by his wife and three sons.
