= Gregor Edmunds =

Scottish strongman (born 1977)

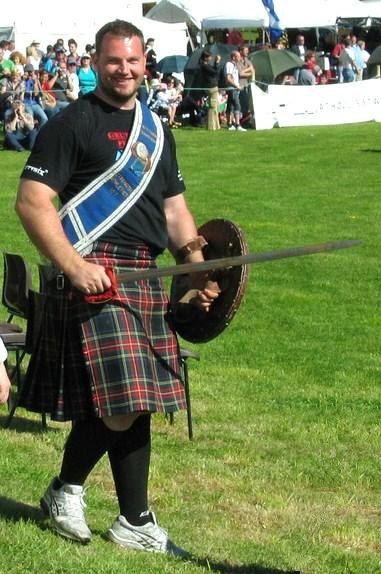

Personal information
- Born: Gregor Edmunds; 25 April 1977 (age 49) Ninewells Dundee Scotland
- Occupation: Highland Games managing director
- Height: 6 ft 4.5 in (1.94 m)
Medal record
Highland Games
Representing Scotland
IHGF World Highland Games Championships
Champion	IHGF World Highland Games Championships 2007
Highlander Challenge
2nd	Highlander Challenge World Championships 2007
3rd	Highlander Challenge World Championships 2008
Champion	Highlander Challenge World Championships 2011
SHGA Highland Games World Championships
Champion	2010
Colonial Highland Games
Champion	2010
Champion	2011
Champion	2012
Markinch Highland Games
Champion	2011
Braemer Highland Games
Champion	2010
European Highland Games Championships
Champion	2009
Stirling Highland Games
Champion	2010
Scottish Highland Games Championships
Champion	2008
London Scottish Rugby Club International Highland Games
Champion	2010
Carumnock International Highland Games
Champion	2010
Skye Highland Games
Champion	2010
Loch Lomond Highland Games
Champion	2010
Cuper Highland Games
Champion	2010
Scottish Native Heavyweight Championships
Champion	2011
Fergus Highland Games
Champion	2008
Clash of the Celtic Giants
Champion	2004
2nd	2005
Strongman
Representing Scotland
Britain's Strongest Man
2nd	Britain's Strongest Man 2002
2nd	Britain's Strongest Man 2003
Scotland's Strongest Man
1st	Scotland's Strongest Man 2002
Representing United Kingdom
World's Strongest Man
8th	2002 World's Strongest Man

Gregor Edmunds (born 1977) is a Scottish Highland Games competitor and strongman. Gregor is a winner of the World Highland Games Championships, Scotland's Strongest Man and former world record holder in 28 lb Weight throw event with a throw of 29.21 metres (95 ft 10 in) at Highlander Challenge at Markinch.

== Background ==
Edmunds was born in 1977 to Moira and Douglas Edmunds and grew up in the south of Glasgow. Edmunds' paternal grandfather, John Morris from Fife, is said to have been part of a gang of fervent Scottish nationalists that included the poet Hugh MacDiarmid, which planned to steal the Stone of Destiny from Westminster Abbey. Such was John Morris' strength that he was to be responsible for carrying the stone, and trained for this task by lifting a heavy steel ingot at his work at the Beardmore forge in Glasgow. The family changed the name from Morris to Edmunds because John was convicted of bigamy and desertion. Gregor Edmunds' great-grandfather, also called John Morris, fought for money in boxing booths. Gregor's father, Douglas was the World Caber Tossing Champion in the 1970s and wrote an autobiography titled "The World's Greatest Tosser". Douglas was also a founder of The World's Strongest Man competition. Despite being immersed in strength sports Edmunds initially asked for a skateboard for his tenth birthday but was given a shot put. Following in his father's footsteps, he began training for Highland Games events and at the age of 17 he was Scottish Junior Highland Games Champion. Additionally, he studied and completed an HND in Sports Therapy Twickenham.

== Career ==
After winning the Scottish Junior Highland Games Championship he went on to compete in Highland Games events around the world. Like with his father he competed in the Braemar Gathering. They remain the only father and son combination to have won the famous Braemar Caber and the overall points championship. In 2007 he became IHGF World Highland Games Champion, ending a five-year American hold on that title. In 2010 Edmunds won the SHGA World Championship. Edmunds also competed successfully in strongman competitions, winning the title of Scotland's Strongest Man in 2002 and going on to compete at the World's Strongest Man reaching the grand finals and finishing in 8th place. He was also second in Britain's Strongest Man in 2002 and 2003.

Gregor set an SHGA Highland Games world record in the 28 lb Weight throw (weight for distance) at the 2011 Markinch Highland Games on 5 June 2011. His throw of 29.21 metres (95 ft 10 in) surpassed Matt Sandford's 28.81 metres (94 ft 6 in) and was officially recognized as the biggest throw of all time. It remained unbeaten for 7 years until Spencer Tyler threw 29.29 metres (96 ft 1 in) in 2018 Topeka Highland games.

Gregor won the 2011 Highlander Challenge on 18 June 2011.

=== The Highlander Challenge ===
The lack of young Scottish Highland Games competitors led Edmunds and his father to organise the Highlander Challenge. In 2007 the Highlander Challenge was successful in achieving record-breaking viewing figures for its time slot enough to spawn a larger event in 2008 at Scone Palace.

== Personal life ==
Gregor currently lives in Glasgow on his father's estate in the village of Carmunnock on Glasgow's south side. Gregor is divorced and has one daughter.
