= 1989 World's Strongest Man =

Strongman competition in 1989

Competition information
- Dates: 18-20 August 1989
- Location: San Sebastián
- Country: Spain
- Athletes participating: 8
- Nations participating: 8

Champion(s)
- (United Kingdom) Jamie Reeves

The 1989 World's Strongest Man was the 12th edition of World's Strongest Man and was won by Jamie Reeves from the United Kingdom. It was his first and only title after finishing third the previous year. Ab Wolders from the Netherlands finished second after finishing fourth the previous year, and Jón Páll Sigmarsson from Iceland finished third. The contest was held at San Sebastián, Spain.

== Final results ==
#	Name	Nationality	Pts
1	Jamie Reeves	United Kingdom	54.5
2	Ab Wolders	Netherlands	49.5
3	Jón Páll Sigmarsson	Iceland	47
4	Bill Kazmaier	United States	40
5	László Fekete	Hungary	32
6	Ilkka Nummisto	Finland	27.5
7	Rudolph Kuester	Germany	20
8	Dusko Markovic	Canada	17.5

Preceded by 1988 World's Strongest Man	1989 World's Strongest Man	Succeeded by 1990 World's Strongest Man
