= Adrian Smith (strongman) =

British strength athlete (born 1964)

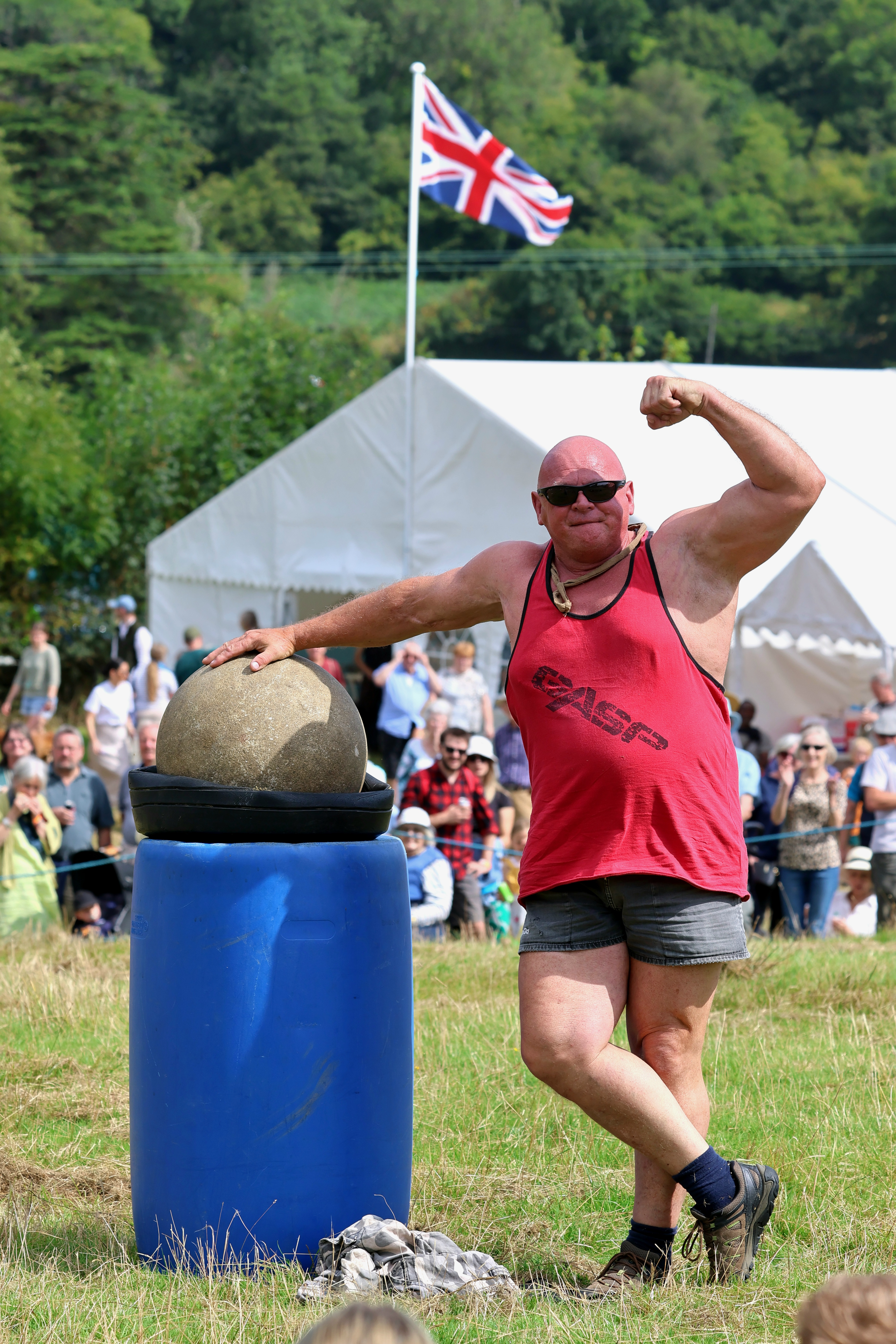
- Adrian Smith in 2024 at the Lustleigh Show

Personal information
- Born: Adrian Smith; 18 March 1964 (age 62) Corby, England
- Occupation: Strongman Bodybuilding
- Height: 5 ft 11 in (1.80 m)
Medal record
Strongman
Representing United Kingdom
World's Strongest Man
5th	1990 World's Strongest Man
Pure Strength
4th	Pure Strength IV 1990 w/Brian Bell
UK's Strongest Man
1st	UK's Strongest Man 1992
1st	UK's Strongest Man 1997
1st	UK's Strongest Man 1998
3rd	UK's Strongest Man 1999
Britain's Strongest Man
1st	Britain's Strongest Man 1990

Adrian Smith (born 18 March 1964) is a former strongman competitor from Great Britain. Adrian has competed in both bodybuilding and strongman. He won UK's Strongest Man three times, Britain's Strongest Man once, and placed 5th in World's Strongest Man.

== Personal life ==
Smith is from Corby and was a photocopier engineer when he started in strongman competitions.

He married Claire in 1998, and has a child, Emily.

== Strongman career ==
Smith was three times winner of UK's Strongest Man in 1992, 1997, and 1998, and winner of Britain's Strongest Man in 1990.

In 1995, Smith took a break from strongman to compete in bodybuilding where he placed 4th in the Mr Britain competition, and invited to compete in the Mr Universe competition that same year.

Missing the 1997 Britain's strongest man through injury, he acted as the commentator for Sky Sports.

He was trained by the legendary Geoff Capes for the 1990 World's Strongest Man competition, his only appearance in WSM, finishing in 5th place. Adrian also competed in Pure Strength IV for team Great Britain along with teammate Brian Bell. Team Great Britain finished in 4th place.

Smith has held the world record for log lifting for reps, managing to press a 200 pounds (91 kg) log above his head 30 times in one minute in 1993, and for brick lifting.

== Live show ==
Smith has performed a peripatetic show, initially as "Adrian Smith, Strongman" and latterly as "The Mighty Smith" at various shows around the country. The show consists of feats of strength including tearing up catalogues, bending nails in his teeth, pulling vehicles, and lifting Atlas stones. He offers a £1,000 prize to anyone who can match his strength feats in the arena.
