= 1990 World's Strongest Man =

Strongman competition in 1990

Competition information
- Dates: 16-18 August 1990
- Location: Joensuu
- Country: Finland
- Athletes participating: 8
- Nations participating: 8

Champion(s)
- (Iceland) Jón Páll Sigmarsson

The 1990 World's Strongest Man was the 13th edition of the World's Strongest Man competition and was won by Jón Páll Sigmarsson from Iceland. It was his fourth title after finishing third the previous year, and his last as he did not compete in any future event before his 1993 death. O.D. Wilson from the United States finished second, and Ilkka Nummisto from Finland finished third after finishing sixth the previous year. The contest was held in Joensuu, Finland.

== Final results ==
| # | Name | Nationality | Pts |
|---|---|---|---|
| 1 | Jón Páll Sigmarsson | Iceland | 48.5 |
| 2 | O.D. Wilson | United States | 48 |
| 3 | Ilkka Nummisto | Finland | 39 |
| 4 | Henning Thorsen | Denmark | 34 |
| 5 | Adrian Smith | United Kingdom | 33.5 |
| 6 | László Fekete | Hungary | 31 |
| 7 | Tjalling van den Bosch | Netherlands | 28.5 |
| 8 | Aap Uspenski | Soviet Union* | 25.5 |

- Aap Uspenski represents Estonia in the colors of the USSR, which is why in 1990 Estonia was still part of the Soviet Union.

| Preceded by 1989 World's Strongest Man | 1990 World's Strongest Man | Succeeded by 1991 World's Strongest Man |
