= 1991 World's Strongest Man =

Strongman competition in 1991

Competition information
- Dates: 4-6 October 1991
- Location: Tenerife
- Country: Spain
- Athletes participating: 8
- Nations participating: 8

Champion(s)
- (Iceland) Magnús Ver Magnússon

The 1991 World's Strongest Man was the 14th edition of World's Strongest Man and was won by Magnus Ver Magnusson from Iceland. It was his first title. Henning Thorsen from Denmark finished second after finishing fourth the previous year, and Gary Taylor from the United Kingdom finished third. The contest was held in Tenerife, Spain.

== Final results ==
#	Name	Nationality	Pts
1	Magnús Ver Magnússon	Iceland	56
2	Henning Thorsen	Denmark	48.5
3	Gary Taylor	United Kingdom	39
4	Ted Van Der Parre	Netherlands	35.5
5	O.D. Wilson	United States	30.5
6	Gregg Ernst	Canada	29.5
7	Markku Suonenvirta	Finland	25.5
8	Manfred Hoeberl	Austria	22.5

Preceded by 1990 World's Strongest Man	1991 World's Strongest Man	Succeeded by 1992 World's Strongest Man
