= László Fekete (strongman) =

Hungarian strength athlete

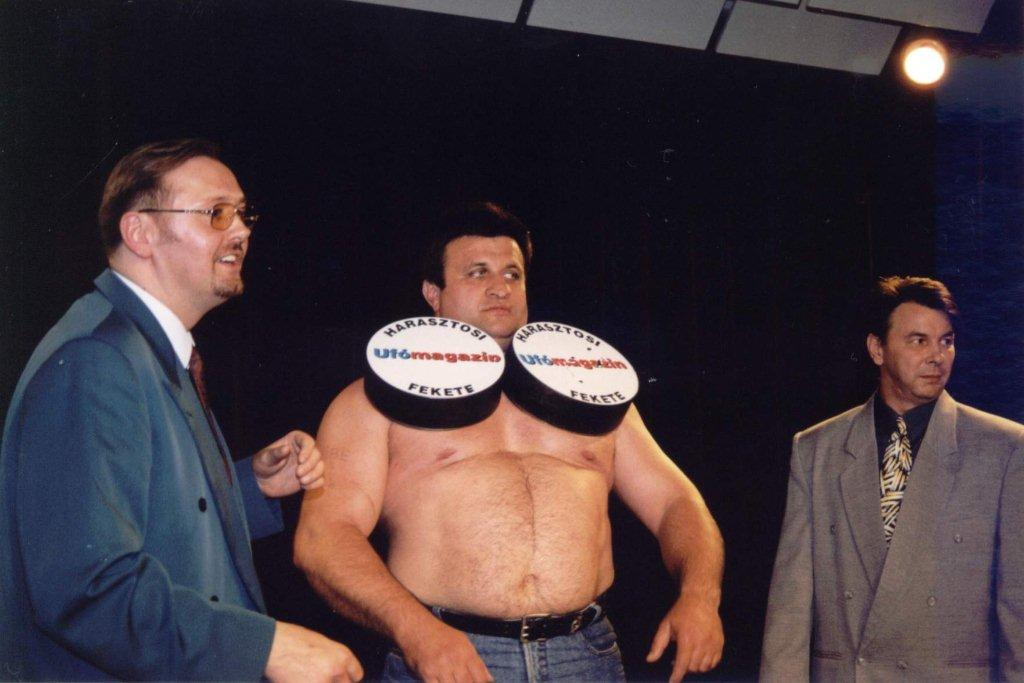

Personal information
- Born: 28 January 1958 (age 68) Ősi, Hungary
- Occupation: Strongman
- Height: 185 cm (6 ft 1 in)
- Children: Miklós Fekete (Son)
- Website: http://www.feketelaszlo.hu/hu/home.htm

László Fekete (born 1958, in Ősi) is a strongman from Hungary. He was ten times Hungary's Strongest Man from 1988 to 1997 and 1992 Europe's Strongest Man champion. He participated in the World's Strongest Man finals in 1988, 1989, 1990 and 1999, emerging fifth in 1989 and sixth in 1990.

Between 1991-2001 in parallel with World's Strongest Man, Fekete organised the World's Natural Strongest Man mini series (also known as László Classic) in Hungary in which he also participated. His son Miklós also competed alongwith athletes representing Sweden, France, Australia, England and Canada.

A prolific stone-lifter, Fekete is known for his skills across many different lifts. Before turning into strength sports, Fekete was a handball player and millstone thrower.

== Personal records ==
- Deadlift – 300 kg (661 lb) Raw (1999 World's Strongest Man)
- Elevated Deadlift – 380 kg (838 lb) Raw (1997 European Open)
- Log press – 140 kg (309 lb) (2003 Holland Grand Prix)
- Manhood Stone (Max Atlas Stone) – 232.5 kg (513 lb) over 4 ft 2 in bar (2003 World's Strongest Team) (Former World Record)

→ The first man to load a 500 lb Atlas stone. Fekete has broken this world record a total of 4 times ever since he did it first with 211 kg (465 lb) in 1998, followed by 217.5 kg (480 lb) in 1999, and 222 kg (489 lb) in 2001.

- Atlas stones – 5 stones 120–173 kg (265–381 lb) in 21.13 seconds (1999 IFSA Finland Grand Prix)
- Atlas stone forward carry – 120 kg (265 lb) for 25 metres in 19.91 seconds (1998 IFSA Hungary Grand Prix) (World Record)
- Stone to shoulder – 145 kg (320 lb) x 5 times (1999 IFSA Hungary Grand Prix)
- Rock press – 131 kg (289 lb) (1998 IFSA Hungary Grand Prix)
- Keg toss – 12.5 kg (28 lb) over 6.10 metres (20 ft 0 in) (1999 IFSA Hungary Grand Prix)
- Weight over bar – 25.5 kg (56 lb) over 5.50 metres (18 ft 1 in) (1992 Europe's Strongest Man) (Former World Record)

== International results ==
- 1992 Europe's Strongest Man – 1st place
- 1998 IFSA Hungary Grand Prix – 3rd place
- 1999 IFSA Hungary Grand Prix – 4th place
- 2001 Atlantic Giant – 4th place
- 1989 World's Strongest Man – 5th place
- 1999 Atlantic Giant – 5th place
- 1990 World's Strongest Man – 6th place

== National results ==
- 1988-1997 Hungary's Strongest Man (10 x times Champion)
- 1989-1991 Hungarian Toldi Miklós race winner
- 1998-2004 Hungarian Strongest Man race winner

== Honours ==
- 1991 Hungarian perpetually Toldi Miklós rank
- 1991-1992-1993 the best adult sport man in Komárom-Esztergom county
- 1993 The best sport man of the town of Dorog
- 1994 Sport glory prize
- 1994-2004 The best extreme sport man on Komárom-Esztergom county
- 2002 Hungarian Republic merit Knight Cross
