= Richard Slaney =

British discus thrower

Personal information
- Nationality: British (English)
- Born: 16 May 1956 (age 70) Redhill, Surrey, England
- Height: 6 ft 7 in (2.01 m)
- Weight: 265 lb (120 kg)

Sport
- Sport: Athletics, Strongman
- Event: Discus throw
- College team: San Diego State University
- Club: Essex Beagles
Medal record
Strongman
Representing United Kingdom
Britain's Strongest Man
First place	1980
Third place	1981
First place	1982
Europe's Strongest Man
Second place	1980

Richard Charles Slaney (born 16 May 1956) is a male British discus thrower who competed in the 1984 Summer Olympics and strongman competitor, notable for being a repeat winner of the Britain's Strongest Man title.

At the UK Athletics Championships he won in 1979, ranked second in 1977 to 1978, and was third in 1980. He also came third in the shot put in 1980.

== Biography ==
Slaney was born in Redhill, Surrey. As a sportsman he was foremost a field athlete specialising in the discus. However, whilst actively pursuing this sport, he did compete as a strength athlete and won the Britain's Strongest Man competition in 1980 and 1982. He also finished second behind Geoff Capes in the 1980 Europe's Strongest Man competition. Across the pond in the same time period, he competed in track and field at San Diego State University. He is still the university record holder in the discus throw, his 64.64 best in 1982 outdistances the next best in university history by over 5 metres. He represented England in the discus and shot put events, at the 1982 Commonwealth Games in Brisbane, Queensland, Australia.

As a discus thrower he qualified for the 1984 Olympic Games finishing 15th overall. Domestically, he threw the 2nd best UK discus performance of 1980, 3rd best in 1981 and the top UK discus performances in 1982 to 1986 inclusive. In 1986 he became the British discus throw champion after winning the British AAA Championships title at the 1986 AAA Championships. His personal best of 65.16m makes him the second best British thrower after Perriss Wilkins.

At the 1984 Olympics Slaney is remembered for carrying his fiancee Mary Decker from the track after she lay stricken at trackside during the 3,000m final, having tripped over the bare feet of Zola Budd. Decker and Slaney married on 1 January 1985; their daughter Ashley was born on 30 May 1986. He represented England in the discus event, at the 1986 Commonwealth Games in Edinburgh, Scotland.

After he retired in 1986 Slaney became a businessman. He also works on restoring antique airplanes living with his family on a 55-acre (220,000 m^{2}) ranch in Eugene, Oregon, US. They have three Weimaraner dogs.

Preceded by Geoff Capes; Geoff Capes	Britain's Strongest Man; 1980; 1982	Succeeded by Geoff Capes; Geoff Capes
