= Marc Vouillot =

French powerlifter

Marc Vouillot (born July 5, 1952) is a French powerlifter and strength coach with an international reputation. He has been called the "Father of French Powerlifting".

== Early life ==
Of French descent, Vouillot was born in Abidjan in Ivory Coast, on July 5, 1952. He moved to Cotonou in Dahomey seven years later because his father was engaged in public works for a French firm, then instrumental in conducting major African construction projects. There, Vouillot first started as a Judoka at the age of 7. In 1963, Vouillot's family relocated to Argenteuil where he was introduced to Olympic Weightlifting by World champion Henri Ferrari.

== Powerlifting career ==
Vouillot has competed in powerlifting for over 30 years and was French national powerlifting champion in 1981, 1982 and 1996. He also competed in many natural bodybuilding contests on national level.

== Coaching career ==
Vouillot has coached many powerlifting champions, including the French super heavy weight Jean-Pierre Brulois, and American Sarah Robertson. He has also worked as a strength and conditioning consultant with a wide range of elite athletes, like the Cuban endurance swimmer Nino Fraguela.

== Bibliography ==
- Marc Vouillot, La Force Athlétique, Paris, Chiron, 2006. ISBN 978-2-7027-0982-5
- Marc Vouillot (and col.), L'Haltérophilie au service de la préparation physique et de la performance, Paris, 2015. ISBN 978-2851809179
- fr:Emmanuel Legeard, Force: Entraînement & Musculation, Paris, 2005. ISBN 2-85180-678-5
