= Henri Ferrari =

French weightlifter (1912–1975)

Personal information
- Born: 23 September 1912 Frontignan, Hérault, France
- Died: 15 February 1975 (aged 62)

Sport
- Country: France
- Sport: Weightlifting
- Weight class: 82.5 kg
- Team: National team
Medal record
Men's Weightlifting
Representing France
World Championships
Bronze medal – third place	1946 Paris	82.5 kg
- Updated on 6 October 2016

Henri Ferrari (23 September 1912 – 15 February 1975) was a French male former weightlifter, who competed in the light heavyweight class and represented France at international competitions. He won the bronze medal at the 1946 World Weightlifting Championships in the 82.5 kg category. In Argenteuil in the 1960s, Henri Ferrari coached a number of future champions to include Marc Vouillot among others.
