= Andy Drzewiecki =

British weightlifter

Personal information
- Full name: Andrzej Drzewiecki
- Born: 9 November 1947 (age 78) London, England
- Occupation(s): Strongman Olympic Weightlifting, Teacher
- Height: 5 ft 11 in (180 cm)

Competition record

Weightlifting

Representing Great Britain

Olympic Games
| 10th | 1980 Summer Olympic Games |

Representing England

Commonwealth Games
| Bronze medal – third place | 1978 Commonwealth Games | |

Strongman

Representing England

Britain's Strongest Man
| 3rd | 1982 |

Andy Drzewiecki (born Andrzej Drzewiecki, 9 November 1947) is a former athlete, weightlifter and strongman from England. He won a bronze medal at the Commonwealth Games in 1978 in the heavyweight class of the weightlifting. He also competed at the 1980 Summer Olympic Games in Moscow. In 1979 he competed in the first ever Britain's Strongest Man, won by Geoff Capes, and came third in that event in 1982. Prior to that he had also competed successful at a national level in various field athletic events.

== Sport ==
As a younger sportsman, Drzewiecki was a nationally renowned field athlete. He won the AAA Midland Counties discus championship in 1968 and 1969 and in 1973 won the shot put at the same championships. In the mid-seventies he shifted his focus to weightlifting and eventually won a bronze medal at the Commonwealth Games in 1978 in the heavyweight class. He also competed at the 1980 Summer Olympic Games in Moscow coming tenth. In 1979 he competed in the first ever Britain's Strongest Man, won by Geoff Capes, and came third in that event in 1982.

== Life outside sport ==
Drzewiecki became a teacher. He was a subject of an unfair dismissal in 2007 the scale of which was such that it was reported on nationally by the BBC and other media. Having sent and then escorted a classroom bully to the head teacher of his primary school, the pupil alleged that he had used excessive force. Drzewiecki was ordered home from St Mary's Tunstall, Stoke-on-Trent immediately. A police investigation was dropped, but Drzewiecki was sacked six months later in June 2007, following a disciplinary hearing. A subsequent employment tribunal, after five day days of hearings, ruled that Drzewiecki's dismissal had been "thoroughly unfair". Drzewiecki won compensation, but later said the incident made it "extremely difficult for him to work again as a primary teacher."
