= Caber toss =

Traditional Scottish athletic event

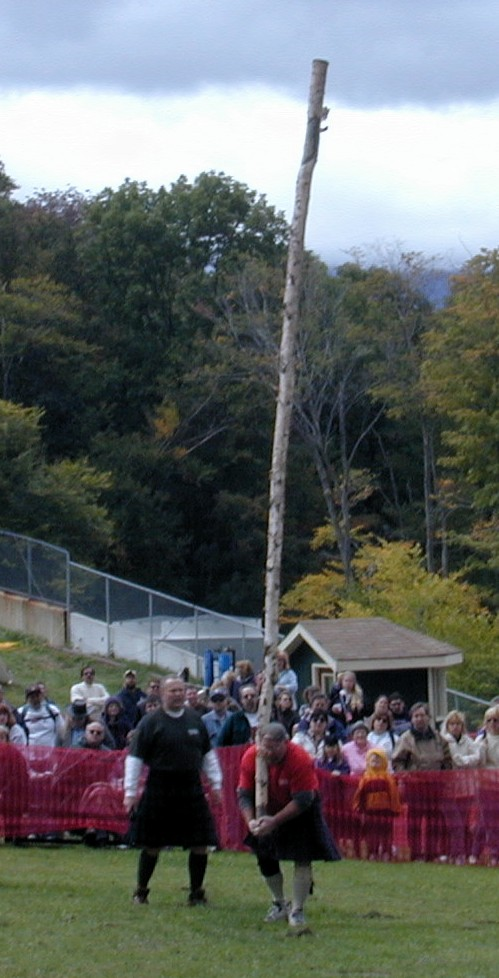
- A caber being tossed at the 2000 New Hampshire Highland Games

Presence
- Country or region: Scotland
- Olympic: No

The caber toss (Scottish Gaelic: tilgeil a' chabair) is a traditional Scottish athletic event in which competitors toss a large tapered pole called a "caber" (/ˈkeɪbər/), normally practiced at the Scottish Highland Games.

The term "caber" derives from the Gaelic word cabar, which refers to a wooden beam, and the person tossing the caber is called a "tosser" or a "thrower". In Scotland, the caber is usually made from a larch tree, and it can be 16–20 feet (5–6 metres) tall and weigh 90–150 pounds (40–70 kilograms).

Although the sport is primarily associated with Scotland, a similar exercise, "casting the bar", was popular in England in the 16th century, and similar sports exist around the world, such as stångstörtning in Sweden.

== Objective and technique ==
The primary objective is to toss the caber so that it turns end over end, falling away from the tosser. Ideally it should fall directly away from the tosser in the "12 o'clock" position.

The tosser balances the caber upright, tapered end downwards, against his or her shoulder and neck, the caber being supported by stewards or fellow competitors while being placed into position. The tosser then crouches, sliding their interlocked hands down the caber and under the rounded base, and lifts it in their cupped hands. The tosser must balance the caber upright; this is not easy with the heavier end at the top, and less experienced tossers may be unable to stop the caber falling to one side after lifting it. The tosser then walks or runs a few paces forward to gain momentum, and flips the tapered end upwards so that the large end hits the ground first, and, if well tossed, the caber falls directly away from the tosser.

Weight and strength are essential for success, but technique is also important for balancing the caber when lifting it, and flipping up the held (tapered) end to promote a clean toss.

== Scoring ==
The straightest end-over-end toss scores highest. If the caber lands on its end but falls back towards the thrower, the score is lower than for any end-over-end throw but is based upon the maximum vertical angle that the caber achieved (side-judging may involve a second judge).

End-over-end tosses are scored according to the hours on a clock, with a 12:00 score being highest (falling directly away from the thrower), down to a 9 or 3 for cabers that reach a vertical, before falling to the side.

== World records ==
For angle

- 60 kg (132 lb) Braemar challenge caber at 12 o'clock by Douglas Edmunds (Scotland) (1976 World Caber Tossing Championships)

For distance

- 40 kg (88 lb) for 13.24 metres (43 ft 5 in) by Douglas Edmunds (Scotland) (1985 World Muscle Power Classic)
- 36 kg (79 lb) for 17.29 metres (56 ft 9 in) (on ice) by Jón Páll Sigmarsson (Iceland) (1984 World's Strongest Man)

For height

- 35 kg (77 lb) over 6.00 metres (19 ft 8 in) shared by Tjalling van den Bosch (Netherlands) and Jamie Reeves (England) (1990 World Muscle Power Classic and 2000 World Muscle Power Classic)
- 32 kg (71 lb) over 6.20 metres (20 ft 4 in) by Phil Martin (United States) (1995 World Muscle Power Classic)

For repetitions

- 40 kg (88 lb) for 26 tosses in 3 minutes by Andrew Murphie (Scotland) (2024 Grantown East Highland Games)
- 36 kg (79 lb) for 161 tosses in 1 hour by Jason Baines (Canada) (2021 Montreal Highland Games)

== Photo gallery ==
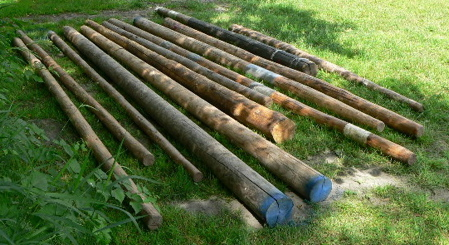
A selection of cabers of various lengths and weights

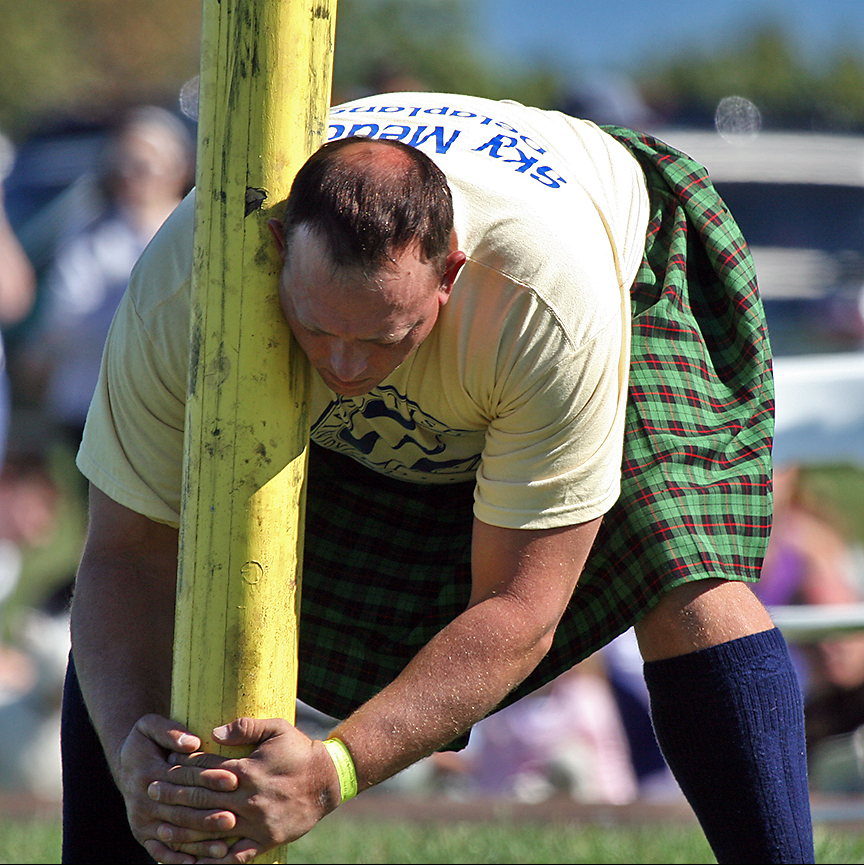
Getting ready to lift

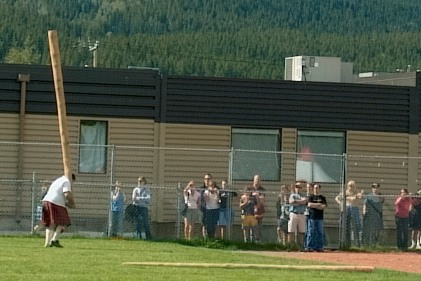
The run-up

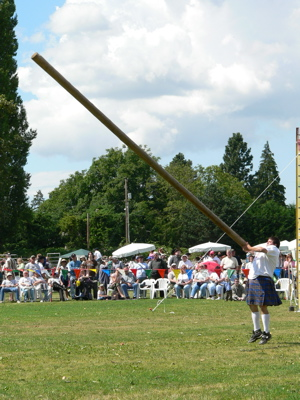
Moment of release

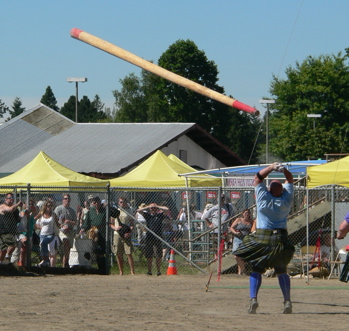
The caber in mid-flight

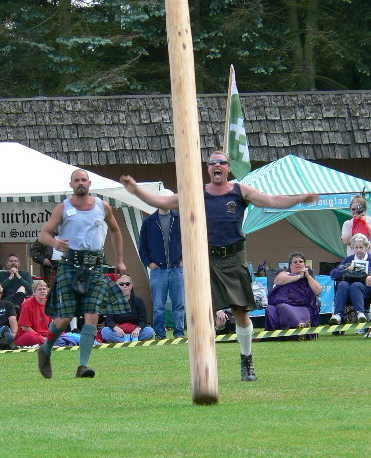
The caber strikes the ground

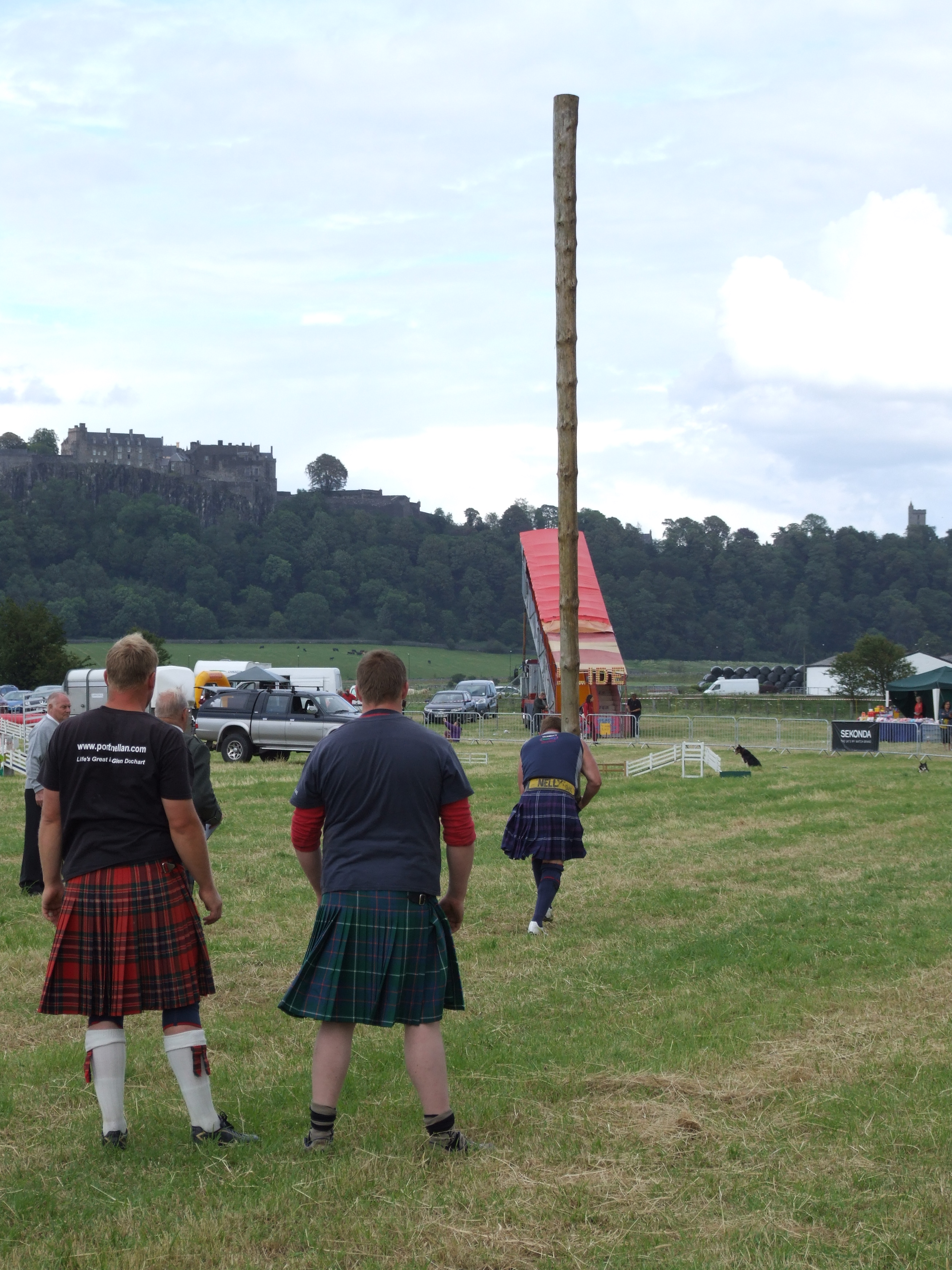

== See also ==
- Stone put
- Scottish hammer throw
- Weight throw
- Weight over the bar
- Sheaf toss
- Woodsman#Pulpwood toss
