= 1985 World's Strongest Man =

Strongman competition in 1985

Competition information
- Dates: 14-15 November 1985
- Location: Cascais
- Country: Portugal
- Athletes participating: 8
- Nations participating: 7

Champion(s)
- (United Kingdom) Geoff Capes

The 1985 World's Strongest Man was the ninth edition of World's Strongest Man and was won by Geoff Capes from the United Kingdom. It was his second title after finishing third the previous year. 1984 champion Jón Páll Sigmarsson from Iceland finished second and Cees de Vreugd from the Netherlands finished third. The contest was held at Cascais, Portugal.

== Final results ==
#	Name	Nationality	Pts
1	Geoff Capes	United Kingdom	50.5
2	Jon Pall Sigmarsson	Iceland	49
3	Cees de Vreugd	Netherlands	45.5
4	George Hechter	United States	36
5	Tom Magee	Canada	33
6	Rick "Grizzly" Brown	United States	29
7	Roger Ekstrom	Finland	25.5
8	Jean-Pierre Brulois	France	19.5

Preceded by 1984 World's Strongest Man	1985 World's Strongest Man	Succeeded by 1986 World's Strongest Man
