= Sebastian Wenta =

Polish athlete and strongman (born 1975)

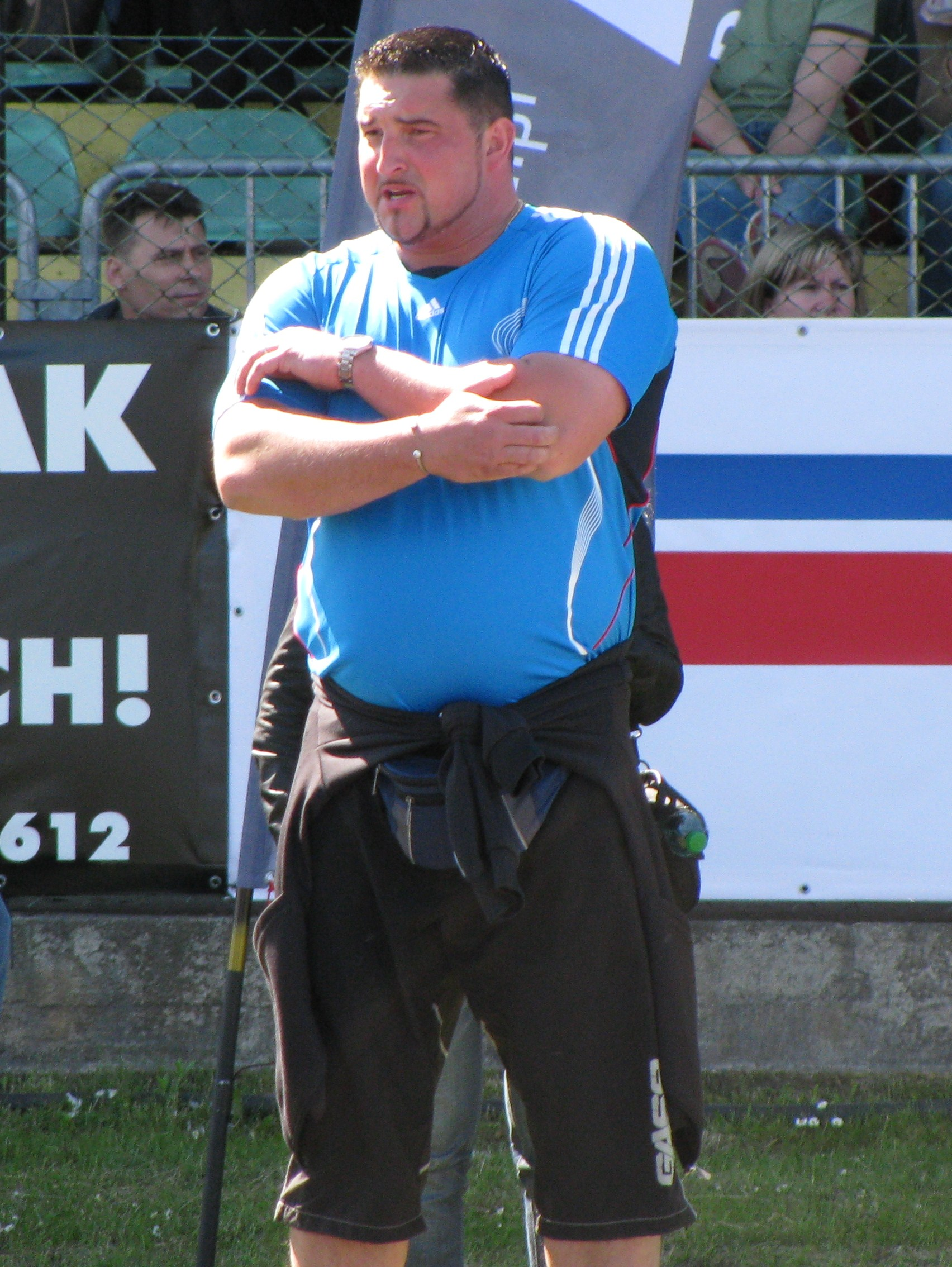

Personal information
- Born: Sebastian Wenta; May 4, 1975 (age 51) Poland
- Occupation: Highland Games/Strongman
- Height: 6 ft 7 in (2.01 m)
- Weight: 330 lb (150 kg)
Medal record
Highland Games
Representing Poland
Highlander Challenge
Champion	Highlander Challenge World Championships 2007
Champion	Highlander Challenge World Championships 2008
Champion	Highlander Challenge World Championships 2009
2nd	Highlander Challenge World Championships 2011
Strongman
Representing Poland
World's Strongest Man
6th	2006 World's Strongest Man
2nd	2007 World's Strongest Man
6th	2008 World's Strongest Man
Qualified	2009 World's Strongest Man
Fortissimus
3rd	Fortissimus 2008
Europe's Strongest Man
2nd	2007 Europe's Strongest Man

Sebastian Wenta (born 1975), also known as Wentyl, is a former shot putter, strongman, and Highland Games competitor from Poland. Wenta's athletic career started with volleyball, and he eventually moved on to the shot put and discus throw. He began competing in strongman in 2005 and has quickly risen through the ranks. His biggest accomplishment to date is coming in second at the 2007 World's Strongest Man contest.

Wenta lives in Tczew, Poland and owns two sports outlets.

== Personal records ==
- Kettlebell press for reps (one arm) – 80 kg (176 lb) x 9 reps (2008 Globe's Strongest Man) (Joint-World Record)

== Physical stats ==
- Height: 6'7"
- Weight: 330 lb
- Biceps: 21 in
- Chest: 61 in

== Results ==
- 2005
  - Bronze Medal - Mistrzostwa Europy Highland Games, Szkocja
  - 2nd - Puchar Polski Strongman, Ostróda
  - 1st - Puchar Polski Strongman, Golub-Dobrzyń
  - 2nd - Międzynarodowe Zawody Strongman, Litwa
  - 5th - United Strongman Series, Bangkok
- 2006
  - 3rd - Drugi Pojedynek Gigantów, Łódź
  - 1st - United Strongman Series, Kijów (Kyiv)
  - 1st - Puchar Świata Highland Games, Szkocja
  - 3rd - United Strongman Series, Serbia
  - 1st - United Strongman Series, Moskwa
  - 1st - Europa vs USA Highland Games, Irlandia
  - 1st - Polska vs Europa, Borne Sulinowo
  - 3rd - Super Seria, Milin
  - 2nd - Finał Pucharu Świata Highland Games, Szkocja
  - 3rd - Mistrzostwa Polski, Września
  - 6th - World's Strongest Man, Sanya, China
  - 2nd - World Strongman Cup, Grodzisk Mazowiecki
- 2007
  - 4th - Trzeci Pojedynek Gigantów, Łódź
  - 2nd - World's Strongest Man, Anaheim, California, USA
- 2008
  - 3rd - Fortissimus, Notre-Dame-du-Rosaire, Quebec, Canada
- 2009
  - Carmunnock International Highland Games Champion, Glasgow, Scotland, United Kingdom
  - World Pipe Band Championships 2009, Winner of the Heavies

=== Personal Bests ===
Shot Put: 19.48 m or about 63 feet (19 m) and 11 inches (280 mm) from 2001 (18th result in the Polish all-time table)

Source: http://www.zbjonik.republika.pl/at_08m.htm
