= 1988 World's Strongest Man =

Strongman competition in 1988

Competition information
- Dates: 1988
- Location: Budapest
- Country: Hungary
- Athletes participating: 8
- Nations participating: 8

Champion(s)
- (Iceland) Jón Páll Sigmarsson

The 1988 World's Strongest Man was the 11th edition (because there was no contest in 1987) of the World's Strongest Man. It was won by Jón Páll Sigmarsson from Iceland, it being his third title. 1980, 1981 and 1982 winner Bill Kazmaier from the United States finished second, and Jamie Reeves from the United Kingdom finished third. The contest was held in Budapest, Hungary.

== Final results ==
#	Name	Nationality	Loading Race	Ox-cart Dead Lift	Truck Pull	Log Lift	Forward Hold	Sack Race	High Throw	Atlas Stones	Pts
1	Jón Páll Sigmarsson	Iceland	8	5	8	6	6	7	8	8	56
2	Bill Kazmaier	United States	5	8	7	8	5	8	3	7	51
3	Jamie Reeves	United Kingdom	4	6.5	6	7	8	5	7	4	47.5
4	Ab Wolders	Netherlands	7	3	5	4.5	7	4	6	5	41.5
5	Ilkka Nummisto	Finland	6	6.5	4	2.5	4	6	5	6	40
6	Joe Quigley	Australia	2	3	3	2.5	3	3	4	3	23.5
7	Jean-Pierre Brulois	France	1	3	2	4.5	1	1	2	1	15.5
8	László Fekete	Hungary	3	1	1	0	2	2	0	2	11

Preceded by Not Held	1988 World's Strongest Man	Succeeded by 1989 World's Strongest Man
