= Douglas Edmunds =

Scottish caber toss champion

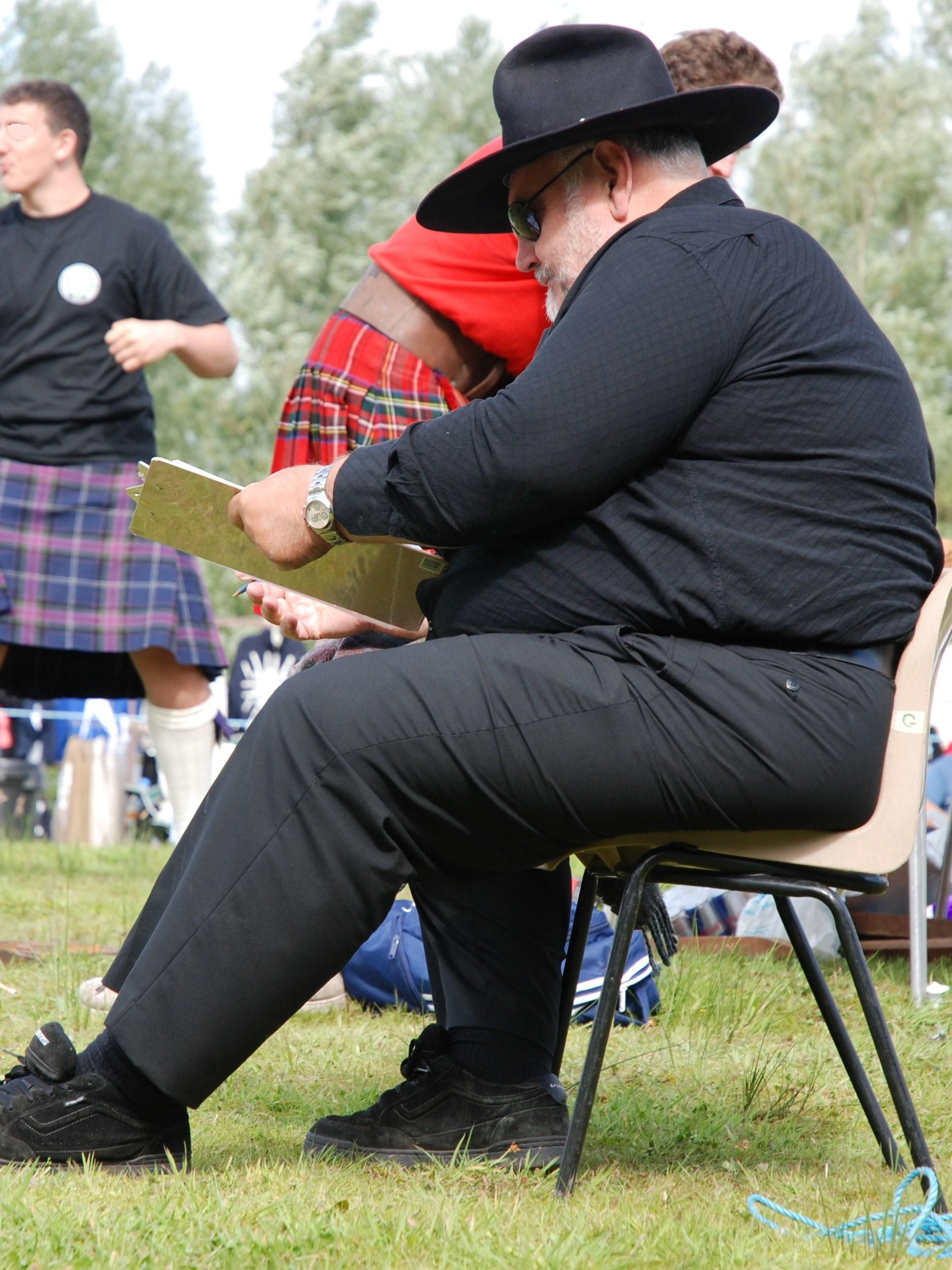
- Edmunds in 2007
- Born: Douglas Morris Edmunds; 29 May 1944; Glasgow, Scotland
- Died: 30 October 2020 (aged 76)
- Education: University of Strathclyde
- Occupations: Businessman, metallurgy engineer
- Known for: Strongman, caber toss, shot and discus champion, referee of World's Strongest Man
- Height: 6 ft 3 in (191 cm)
- Title: Dr
- Spouse(s): Moira Edmunds (divorced), Linda Edmunds (1992-2020)
- Children: 3, including Gregor Edmunds
- Relatives: 3 siblings

Douglas Morris Edmunds (29 May 1944 – 30 October 2020) was a Scottish Highland Games competitor and strongman. Known as the "Godfather of Strongman", he was a two-time world champion of the caber toss and co-founded and acted as referee for the World's Strongest Man competition. He was also a co-founder of the International Federation of Strength Athletes and Highlander Challenge World Championships. He was the father of strongman Gregor Edmunds.

== Early life ==
Edmunds was born on 29 May 1944 in Glasgow, Scotland, to John and Izabella Edmunds, and was named after Douglas Young. One of four children, he lived in the former Netherton army camp. He attended St Colombia's RC prep school in Largs and St Joseph's College, Dumfries, where he played rugby for the South of Scotland schools match against Wales and won titles in shot put and discus. He attended Glasgow University before switching to the University of Strathclyde, where he gained a doctorate in metallurgy in 1969. He worked in Zambia as a mining engineer for three years in the early 1970s before returning to Scotland. After his marriage to Moira Edmunds fell apart, he moved to Nigeria in 1980 and stayed there until 1982.

Edmunds worked at Drakemire Dairy Ltd, the family business, between 1982 and 2000, alongside his brother John and brother-in-law Kevin Connelly, eventually becoming the managing director.

In 2013, Edmunds was diagnosed with cancer. He died on 30 October 2020.

== Strength sports ==
Edmunds started competing in strength sports professionally in 1975. He won the world caber tossing championships in 1976 and 1978. He was also the only person capable of tossing the 60 kg (132 lb), 6.00 metres (19 ft 8 in) Braemar challenge caber, a feat he achieved twice. He organised the World Highland Games Championships in Lagos, Nigeria in 1981. In the 1970s he represented Zambia at the World Powerlifting Championships.

Edmunds co-founded the World's Strongest Man competition in 1977 with David P. Webster and acted as the contest's referee, helping to televise strength sports as entertainment for audiences. Between 1992 and 2004, he was the contest's head referee. In 1995, he co-founded the International Federation of Strength Athletes, serving as its president. In 2007, Edmunds created the Goddodin Games in a bid to revive the Highland Games and strongman sports, which he felt had become tired. He believed that the sports should be about engaging and entertaining crowds.

Edmunds has written three books: The Warrior Breed, The World's Greatest Tosser, and Giants and Legends.

== Personal Records ==
- Caber Toss – 60 kg (132 lb) Braemar challenge caber at 12 o'clock (1976 World Caber Tossing Championships) (world record)
- Caber Toss (for distance) – 40 kg (88 lb) for 13.24 metres (43 ft 5 in) (1985 World Muscle Power Classic) (world record)

== Family ==
His father, born John Morris, was part of a group of Scottish nationalists who plotted to steal the Stone of Destiny from Westminster Abbey. He later changed his surname to Edmunds after being arrested for bigamy and to avoid charges of desertion from the army. Edmunds' paternal grandfather, also called John Morris, fought for money in fairground booths.

He married Moira Edmunds (née Graham) in 1970, with whom he had two children, and separated in the 1980s. In 1992 he married Linda Edmunds and had another child by her.

Gregor Edmunds, his son by Moira, is a strength sports competitor, former Scotland's Strongest Man and Highland Games champion.
