= 1992 World's Strongest Man =

Strongman competition in 1992

Competition information
- Dates: 1-3 October 1992
- Location: Reykjavík
- Country: Iceland
- Athletes participating: 10
- Nations participating: 8

Champion(s)
- (Netherlands) Ted van der Parre

The 1992 World's Strongest Man was the 15th edition of World's Strongest Man and was won by Ted van der Parre from the Netherlands after finishing fourth the previous year. It was his first title. 1991 winner Magnus Ver Magnusson from Iceland finished second equal with 1989 winner Jamie Reeves from the United Kingdom. The contest was held in Reykjavík, Iceland.

== Final results ==
#	Name<	Nationality	Pts
1	Ted van der Parre	Netherlands	63
2	Magnús Ver Magnússon	Iceland	62
2	Jamie Reeves	England	62
4	Gerrit Badenhorst	South Africa	57.5
5	Gary Taylor	Wales	43.5
6	Henning Thorsen	Denmark	41
7	Gregg Ernst	Canada	38
8	Ilkka Nummisto	Finland	29
9	James Perry	United States	25
10	Ilkka Kinnunen	Finland	19

Preceded by 1991 World's Strongest Man	1992 World's Strongest Man	Succeeded by 1993 World's Strongest Man
