= European Hercules =

Tournament information
- Location: Finland, various locations
- Established: 1990
- Final year: 1997
- Format: Multi-event competition

Final champion
- (Iceland) Magnús Ver Magnússon

European Hercules was an annual strongman contest which consisted of international athletes from various countries. The event was held annually in Finland from 1990 for eight consecutive years.

Riku Kiri holds the most wins with four consecutive titles in 1990, 1991, 1992 and 1993. Jouko Ahola won it twice, back to back in 1995 and 1996. Andrés Guðmundsson and Magnús Ver Magnússon hold one title each, in 1994 and 1997 respectively.

== Event Placings ==
Year	Champion	Runner-up	3rd place
1990	(Finland) Riku Kiri	(Finland) Ismo Åman	(Finland) Aarre Käpylä
1991	(Finland) Riku Kiri	(Iceland) Jón Páll Sigmarsson & (United Kingdom) Jamie Reeves	
1992	(Finland) Riku Kiri	(Finland) Aarre Käpylä & (Iceland) Magnús Ver Magnússon	
1993	(Finland) Riku Kiri	(Finland) Aarre Käpylä	(Austria) Manfred Hoeberl
1994	(Iceland) Andrés Guðmundsson	(Austria) Manfred Hoeberl	(Finland) Marko Varalahti
1995	(Finland) Jouko Ahola	(Finland) Matti Uppa	(Finland) Mika Palsi
1996	(Finland) Jouko Ahola	(Finland) Hannu Osala	(United Kingdom) Jamie Reeves
1997	(Iceland) Magnús Ver Magnússon	(Finland) Jouko Ahola	(Netherlands) Berend Veneberg
