= Pete Tancred =

Pakistani strongman & discus thrower

Personal information
- Born: 20 October 1949 (age 76) Quetta, Balochistan, Pakistan
- Occupations: Strongman, discus thrower
- Height: 6 ft 2 in (1.88 m)
- Weight: 245 lb (111 kg)

Sport
- Club: Queens Park Harriers
Medal record
Strongman
Britain's Strongest Man
Second place	1984
First place	1986

Peter Arthur Tancred (born 20 October 1949) is a male former athlete, and professional strongman from England. He competed at the 1976 Summer Olympics.

== Athletics career ==
Tancred was born on 20 October 1949 in Quetta, Balochistan, Pakistan, the younger brother of Bill Tancred. In Britain he became affiliated to Queens Park Harriers in London.

At the 1976 Olympics Games in Montreal, he represented Great Britain in the discus throw competition. Domestically, he became the British discus throw champion after winning the British AAA Championships titles at the 1977 AAA Championships and 1978 AAA Championships. following in the footsteps of his brother Bill who won the title seven times.

He represented England in the discus event, at the 1978 Commonwealth Games in Edmonton, Alberta, Canada. Four years later he represented England in the discus event, at the 1982 Commonwealth Games in Brisbane, Australia.

Tancred would also go on to win the UK Athletics Championships title in 1977, 1980 and 1983.

== Strongman career ==
In 1984 he competed in Britain's Strongest Man coming second behind Alan Crossley and two years later won Britain's Most Powerful Man, the replacement for the absent Britain's Strongest Man competition that year.

== National titles ==
- UK Championships
  - Discus throw: 1977, 1980, 1983
- AAA Championships
  - Discus throw: 1977, 1978
