= Britain's Strongest Man =

British strongman competition

Tournament information
- Location: United Kingdom
- Established: 1979; 47 years ago
- Number of tournaments: 41
- Format: Multi-event competition

Current champion
- (Scotland) Tom Stoltman

Britain's Strongest Man is an annual strongman event held in the United Kingdom. Competitors qualify for the final through regional heats and the winner is awarded the title of "Britain's Strongest Man". The competition is produced by TWI and serves as a qualifying event for the World's Strongest Man ("WSM") competition, also a TWI production. The event was first held in 1979.

== History and broadcast ==
In a history that has close parallels with that of the World's Strongest Man competition, the BSM competition has had a number of sponsors and, at different times, has had to vie with rival competitions that also claim to produce the strongest man in Britain as their champion. The inaugural competition was held in 1979 and was organised by TWI. It was broadcast by Thames Television for the ITV network that year, however coverage moved to BBC One in September 1982 until 1984 but returned in August 1999. The final contest involved the field athletes Geoff Capes and Jim Whitehead, weightlifter Andy Drzewiecki, powerlifter Ray Nobile, Highland Games specialists Bill Anderson and Grant Anderson, wrestler Big Pat Roach, and Tosher Killingback; it was won by Geoff Capes. The contestants were there by invitation and the format continued until 1984. There was then a break of three years, from 1985 through 1988, before the competition returned in 1989.

In 1986, there was a "Britain's Most Powerful Man" and, in 1988, a competition was organised by Geoff Capes and David Webster to find a successor to Geoff Capes, called the John Smith's Trial of Strength. The results of these competitions are often deemed to be equivalent to Britain's Strongest Man given the lack of a competition in those years. The IFSA, after its creation in the mid-nineties, managed the event but parted company with TWI and the BBC after the completion of the 2004 event. Despite this TWI have managed to have continued coverage of the event televised, with Sky One and Sky Sports covering it in 2005 before it moved to Five the following year until 2009. Digital channel Bravo covered the event in 2009 and 2010 before its closure; free-to-air channel Challenge took over coverage until it returned to Channel 5 in 2014. The competition is currently sponsored by Met-Rx. As of 2017, Channel 5 currently broadcasts an episode devoted to the Britain's Strongest Man contest, as part of its annual World's Strongest Man coverage, in late December.

== Events ==
Events for the competition include tyre flips, chain drags, Atlas stones and keg tossing.

== Rival and parallel competitions ==
- In 2005 the 'IFSA Strongman British Championship' (or "British Championships (IFSA)") was held in direct competition with the BSM. However, this was short lived, lasting just one year, with the more established BSM gaining better sponsorship (from Met-Rx) and television coverage (Sky One) largely due to its longevity, its qualifying status for World's Strongest Man and also its perception amongst the strongman community as the chief competition. The winner of this breakaway competition, Mark Felix, has since put his energies into competing in the BSM.
- A more enduring rival competition is the UK Strongest Man 'Ultimate Strength Challenge', which began in 1992 and still continues today. However, competing in the BSM and the UKSC is not mutually exclusive and competitors are free to compete in both. This event is run by the UKSC - the UK Strength Council, and focuses more on pure strength rather than strength and speed.
- Other rival or parallel competitions that should not be confused with the BSM are:
  - "UK Championship (IFSA)", which only ran for one year in 1997
  - "Britain's Most Powerful Man", which, although a "rival" in 2007, was last run in 1986, when there was no BSM and its winners are counted in the same list as the winners of the BSM
  - "British Muscle Power Championship" - this ran from 1986 to 1998 and included some of the biggest names of British strength athletics, including Geoff Capes, Jamie Reeves, Mark Higgins, Forbes Cowan, Gary Taylor and Russ Bradley. However, it was not so much a rival of BSM as an extra competition.

== List of champions ==
Year	Champion	Runner-up	3rd place	Location
1979	(England) Geoff Capes	(Scotland) Bill Anderson	(England) Jim Whitehead	Woking Leisure Centre, Woking
1980	(England) Richard Slaney	(Scotland) Jack Hynd	(England) Steve Zetolofsky	London, South Bank
1981	(England) Geoff Capes (2)	(Scotland) Hamish Davidson	(England) Richard Slaney	London
1982	(England) Richard Slaney (2)	(Scotland) Hamish Davidson	(England) Andy Drzewiecki; (England) Errol Carnegie; (England) Peter Welch	Brighton, Sussex
1983	(England) Geoff Capes (3)	(Scotland) Jack Hynd	(Wales) John Burns	Nottingham
1984	(Northern Ireland) Allan Crossley	(England) Pete Tancred & (England) Peter Welch		Telford. Shropshire
1985	Not held			
1986 (Note: "Britain's Most Powerful Man" was the name of the competition in 1986)	(England) Pete Tancred	(England) Peter Davis	(England) Joe Walker	Epping Forest Country Club
1987	Not Held			
1988 (Note: Titled John Smith's Trial of Strength)	(England) Jamie Reeves	(England) Mark Higgins	(Jersey) Peter Tregloan	Tadcaster
1989	(England) Jamie Reeves (2)	TBC	TBC	TBC
1990	(England) Adrian Smith	(Wales) Gary Taylor	TBC	TBC
1991	(Wales) Gary Taylor	(England) Christopher Miles	TBC	TBC
1992	(England) Jamie Reeves (3)	TBC	TBC	TBC
1993	(Scotland) Forbes Cowan	(Wales) Gary Taylor	TBC	TBC
1994	(England) Bill Pittuck	TBC	TBC	TBC
1995	(Scotland) Forbes Cowan (2)	(Wales) Gary Taylor	(Scotland) Jamie Barr	Gateshead
1996	(England) Russel Bradley	TBC	TBC	TBC
1997	(England) Rob Dixon	(Northern Ireland) Glenn Ross	(Wales) Gary Taylor	TBC
1998	(England) Jamie Reeves (4)	(England) Russ Bradley	(Northern Ireland) Glenn Ross	TBC
1999	(Northern Ireland) Glenn Ross	(England) Steve Brooks	(Scotland) Jamie Barr	Alton Towers
2000	(Northern Ireland) Glenn Ross (2)	(England) Steve Brooks	(Scotland) Brian Bell	Alton Towers
2001	(Northern Ireland) Glenn Ross (3)	(England) Rob Dixon	(England) Adrian Rollinson	Minehead
2002	(England) Marc Iliffe	(Scotland) Gregor Edmunds	(England) Bill Pittuck	Criccieth Castle
2003	(England) Rich Gosling	(Scotland) Gregor Edmunds	(Northern Ireland) Glenn Ross	Scarborough
2004	(England) Rich Gosling (2)	(England) Ade Rollinson	(England) Oli Thompson	Minehead
2005	(England) Mick Gosling	(Republic of Ireland) Carl Waitoa	(England) Ade Rollinson	Dudley Castle
2006	(England) Oli Thompson	(England) Mark Felix (Note: Mark Felix was formerly of Grenada.)	(England) Terry Hollands	Isle of Man
2007	(England) Terry Hollands	(England) Mark Felix	(England) Darren Sadler	Minehead
2008	(England) Jimmy Marku (Note: Jimmy Marku was formerly of Albania.)	(England) Terry Hollands	(England) Mark Felix	Minehead
2009	Not held			
2010	Not held			
2011	See Clash of the Giants below			
2012	(England) Laurence Shahlaei	(England) Terry Hollands	(England) Chris Gearing	Colchester, Essex
2013	(England) Laurence Shahlaei (2)	(United States) Jerry Pritchett	(England) Terry Hollands	Gateshead Stadium, Gateshead
2014	(England) Eddie Hall	(England) Graham Hicks	(England) Laurence Shahlaei	Doncaster Dome, Doncaster
2015 (Note: Several competitors from other European countries took part.)	(England) Eddie Hall (2)	(England) Mark Felix	(Poland) Krzysztof Radzikowski	Doncaster Dome, Doncaster
2016	(England) Eddie Hall (3)	(England) Mark Felix	(England) Laurence Shahlaei	Doncaster Dome, Doncaster
2017	(England) Eddie Hall (4)	(England) Laurence Shahlaei	(England) Graham Hicks	Doncaster Dome, Doncaster
2018	(England) Eddie Hall (5)	(England) Graham Hicks	(England) Terry Hollands	FlyDSA Arena, Sheffield
2019	(England) Graham Hicks	(England) Adam Bishop	(Scotland) Tom Stoltman	FlyDSA Arena, Sheffield
2020	(England) Adam Bishop	(Scotland) Tom Stoltman	(Scotland) Luke Stoltman	FlyDSA Arena, Sheffield
2021	(Scotland) Tom Stoltman	(England) Adam Bishop	(England) Graham Hicks	FlyDSA Arena, Sheffield
2022	(Scotland) Tom Stoltman (2)	(Republic of Ireland) Pa O'Dwyer	(England) Adam Bishop	FlyDSA Arena, Sheffield
2023	(England) Adam Bishop (2)	(Wales) Gavin Bilton	(England) Graham Hicks	FlyDSA Arena, Sheffield
2024	(Scotland) Tom Stoltman (3)	(Wales) Gavin Bilton	(Scotland) Luke Stoltman	FlyDSA Arena, Sheffield
2025	(Scotland) Luke Stoltman	(England) Shane Flowers	(England) Andrew Flynn	FlyDSA Arena, Sheffield
2026	(Scotland) Tom Stoltman (4)	(England) Adam Bishop	(England) Paddy Haynes	FlyDSA Arena, Sheffield

=== By country ===
Country	Titles
England	31
Scotland	7
Northern Ireland	4
Wales	1

=== Multiple time champions ===
Champion	Country	Times	Years
Eddie Hall	England	5	2014, 2015, 2016, 2017, 2018
Jamie Reeves	England	4	1988, 1989, 1992, 1998
Tom Stoltman	Scotland	4	2021, 2022, 2024, 2026
Geoff Capes	England	3	1979, 1981, 1983
Glenn Ross	Northern Ireland	3	1999, 2000, 2001
Richard Slaney	England	2	1980, 1982
Forbes Cowan	Scotland	2	1993, 1995
Rich Gosling	England	2	2003, 2004
Laurence Shahlaei	England	2	2012, 2013
Adam Bishop	England	2	2020, 2023

== Clash of the Giants ==
In 2011, an event was organised in Boroughbridge advertised to allow spectators to see "top British strongmen compete to take a step closer towards a place at World's Strongest Man". The event was organised by multiple World's Strongest Man entrant Darren Sadler and the top two places, won by Rob Frampton and Jack McIntosh, received invitations to North Carolina to compete at the 34th edition of World's Strongest Man. Clash of the Giants was designed to fill the void left by the absence of the Britain's Strongest Man competition last held in 2008, much as the 1988 John Smith's Trial of Strength had been created following the discontinuation of the BSM in 1984.

Unlike the BSM, which is the final stage of a knockout competition comprising a number of regional and national rounds, the Clash of the Giants was a singular event. Because there was no regional tiered competition preceding, it there was no prerequisite that the Clash of the Giants have a field of athletes representing each area of Britain and notably all the athletes competing were English. In addition, the three most successful British strength athletes actively competing at the time, namely Hollands, Felix and Shahlaei, had qualified for the WSM via international grand prix events and did not compete.

== See also ==
- List of strongman competitions
