= Ősi =

- Location of Veszprém county in Hungary

- Location of Ősi
- Coordinates: 47.14197°N 18.18844°E
- Country: Hungary
- County: Veszprém

Area
  - Total: 35.86 km^{2} (13.85 sq mi)

Population (2012)
  - Total: 2,146
  - Density: 61.76/km^{2} (160.0/sq mi)
- Time zone: UTC+1 (CET)
  - Summer (DST): UTC+2 (CEST)
- Postal code: 8161
- Area code: 88

Ősi is a village in Veszprém county, Hungary.
