= Jón Páll Sigmarsson =

Icelandic strongman (1960–1993)

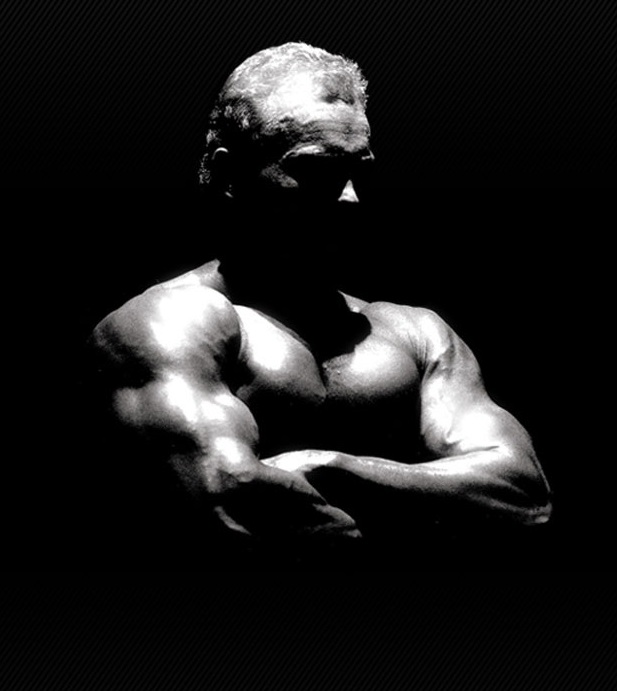
- Official portrait of Jón Páll Sigmarsson in 1988
- Born: 28 April 1960; Hafnarfjörður, Iceland
- Died: 16 January 1993 (aged 32); Reykjavík, Iceland
- Other name: The Viking
- Occupations: Strongman, powerlifter, bodybuilder
- Years active: 1979–1993
- Height: 193 cm (6 ft 4 in)
- Title: 4× World's Strongest Man; 2× Europe's Strongest Man; 5× winner of World Muscle Power Championships
- Children: Sigmar Freyr Jónsson

Competition record

Strongman

Representing Iceland

World's Strongest Man
2nd	1983 World's Strongest Man
1st	1984 World's Strongest Man
2nd	1985 World's Strongest Man
1st	1986 World's Strongest Man
1st	1988 World's Strongest Man
3rd	1989 World's Strongest Man
1st	1990 World's Strongest Man

Pure Strength
1st	Pure Strength 1987

World Muscle Power Championships
1st	1985 World Muscle Power Championships
1st	1986 World Muscle Power Championships
2nd	1987 World Muscle Power Championships
3rd	1988 World Muscle Power Championships
1st	1989 World Muscle Power Championships
1st	1990 World Muscle Power Championships
1st	1991 World Muscle Power Championships
3rd	1992 World Muscle Power Championships

Europe's Strongest Man
3rd	1983 Europe's Strongest Man
1st	1985 Europe's Strongest Man
1st	1986 Europe's Strongest Man
3rd	1987 Europe's Strongest Man
2nd	1988 Europe's Strongest Man
3rd	1989 Europe's Strongest Man
4th	1990 Europe's Strongest Man
4th	1992 Europe's Strongest Man

Le Defi Mark Ten International
3rd	1985 Le Defi Mark Ten International
2nd	1986 Le Defi Mark Ten International
5th	1987 Le Defi Mark Ten International

World Strongman Challenge
3rd	1987 World Strongman Challenge
2nd	1988 World Strongman Challenge

Battle of the Giants
2nd	1989

World Mighty Man
9th	1992

Iceland's Strongest Man
1st	1985 Iceland's Strongest Man
1st	1986 Iceland's Strongest Man
1st	1987 Iceland's Strongest Man
1st	1990 Iceland's Strongest Man
1st	1992 Iceland's Strongest Man

Finland's Strongest Man
1st	1989 Finland's Strongest Man
1st	1992 Finland's Strongest Man

Powerlifting

Representing Iceland

IPF World Powerlifting Championships
3rd	1981 IPF World Powerlifting Championships	125 kg

EPF European Powerlifting Championships
2nd	1980 EPF European Powerlifting Championships	125 kg
2nd	1981 EPF European Powerlifting Championships	125 kg
1st	1983 EPF European Powerlifting Championships	125 kg

NPF Nordic Powerlifting Championships
2nd	1979 NPF Nordic Powerlifting Championships	+110 kg
1st	1980 NPF Nordic Powerlifting Championships	+125 kg
1st	1981 NPF Nordic Powerlifting Championships	+125 kg

Highland Games

Representing Iceland

Commonwealth Highland Games
Champion	1986

Jón Páll Sigmarsson (Note: Icelandic pronunciation: [ˈjouːn ˈpʰautl̥ ˈsɪɣmar̥sɔn].) (28 April 1960 – 16 January 1993) was an Icelandic strongman, powerlifter and bodybuilder. He was the first man to win the World's Strongest Man four times, the only man to win the World Muscle Power Classic five times and the only man to win Pure Strength individual title.

Widely regarded as one of the greatest strength athletes all time, Jón Páll is credited with developing Iceland's strength identity. He also won 13 international competitions and set 24 world records, was named Icelandic Sportsperson of the Year in 1981, and was posthumously inducted into the World's Strongest Man Hall of Fame in 2012.

== Early life ==
Jón Páll was born in Hafnarfjörður on 28 April 1960, weighing 4 kg (9 lb) and measuring 52 centimetres (20 in). He was the first child of Dóra Jónsdóttir and Sigmar Jónsson. He was raised by his mother and foster father Sveinn Guðmundsson. The family moved to Stykkishólmur when he was two. He remained there until the age of nine, when the family relocated to Reykjavík.

Growing up, he spent his summers on Skáleyjar and was active as a farmhand. He worked from dawn until dusk, carrying pails of water and assisting his foster father on seal hunts. He took up Glima, a traditional Icelandic form of wrestling at the age of five and later played an array of sports such as football, handball, gymnastics, karate, swimming and middle-distance running.

== Career ==
Jón Páll was introduced to weightlifting in 1976, and began training at the 'Jakaból' gym in 1978. The same year he won the Icelandic junior bodybuilding title in the +90 kg. class. His was also showing great numbers in powerlifting, including Icelandic national records in the bench press (with 192.5 kg (424 lb), 195 kg (430 lb), 210 kg (463 lb) and 222.5 kg (491 lb)) and the squat (with 320.5 kg (707 lb), 330 kg (728 lb), 342.5 kg (755 lb) and 357.5 kg (788 lb)), but his best performances were usually in the deadlift event, in which he set the European record many times (with 350 kg (772 lb), 352.5 kg (777 lb), 360 kg (794 lb), 362.5 kg (799 lb) and 370 kg (816 lb)). The Icelandic phrase 'Þetta er ekkert mál fyrir Jón Pál!' was often yelled by him during deadlifting. While continuously winning bodybuilding competitions, he did his first strongman competition in 1982.

=== 1983–1985 ===
Jón Páll was invited to the World's Strongest Man for the first time in 1983, in which he emerged runner-up to Geoff Capes by one and a half points. He showcased his immense strength by performing a 525 kg (1,157 lb) silver dollar deadlift. He also emerged third at the Europe's Strongest Man. The following year, at age 24, he defeated Capes by 6 points and won 1984 World's Strongest Man in Mora, Sweden, becoming the youngest person to ever win the World's Strongest Man; a record which he holds to-date. Soon after the final armwrestling event, Jón Páll famously shouted "The King has lost his crown!" He won three events (truck pull, caber toss and rock press) and came second in four events in the process.

In 1985 Jón Páll lost the title to Capes, again by only one and a half points. During the deadlift event, a spectator in the audience yelled "Eskimo" to Jón Páll, and he famously yelled back: "I am not an Eskimo, I'm a Viking!" and successfully lifted the 495 kg (1,091 lb) cart. In 1985 Jón Páll won Europe's Strongest Man and also won both the inaugural World Muscle Power Classic and inaugural Iceland's Strongest Man. During one of the events in Iceland's Strongest Man, he famously danced while carrying the 186 kg (410 lb) Húsafell Stone.

=== 1986–1987 ===
In 1986 World's Strongest Man in Nice, France, Jón Páll won his second title, beating Capes by 4 points. He won four events (carry & drag, McGlashen stones, deadlift and the loading race) and came second in three events in the process. Also in 1986, Jón Páll won World Muscle Power Classic, Europe's Strongest Man and Commonwealth Highland Games. In the same year, he wrestled English author and Guinness World Record holder Brian Sterling-Vete in an exhibition match for the TV news and print media held at Finnur Karlsson's gymnasium in Reykjavík, Iceland.

In 1987, began Jón Páll's rivalry with Bill Kazmaier who returned to strength sports following his ban from World's Strongest Man after 1982. Kazmaier boasted some of the heaviest powerlifting lifts of that time and had made his reputation in the 1980s as "the strongest man who ever lived" by breaking numerous strongman world records. In 1987, World's Strongest Man was not held for the first and only time in its history. However, 3x times champion Kazmaier, 2x times champion Capes and then 2x times champion Jón Páll met at 1987 Pure Strength, a vintage competition held in the grounds of Huntly Castle in Aberdeenshire, Scotland to determine who is the strongest man on Earth. Jón Páll who turned in at his all-time heaviest bodyweight dominated the competition, winning 8 out of 10 events while breaking multiple world records in the process. A legendary quote, "There is no reason to be alive, if you can't do deadlift!" was shouted by Jón Páll at the top of the 455 kg (1,003 lb) rectangular-handled cartwheel deadlift during the competition. He won the event with a world record lift of 523 kg (1,153 lb). He also managed to break the log lift world record with 163.5 kg (360 lb).

=== 1988–1990 ===
In 1988 Capes retired, and at the 1988 World's Strongest Man Jón Páll and Kazmaier clashed again. Kazmaier won the deadlift, log lift and sack race but Jón Páll won the Weight over bar with a five-point lead and McGlashen Stones in the end to secure the overall victory, equaling Kazmaier's record for three World's Strongest Man titles. After his victory Jón Páll said: "I may be the fastest strongman in the world, but I think Bill is the strongest on his feet". The same year, Jón Páll won the Icelandic Bodybuilding championship in +90 kg class.

In 1989 Jón Páll won the World Muscle Power Classic but placed third both at the 1989 World's Strongest Man and Europe's Strongest Man.

In 1990, Jón Páll came to the 1990 World's Strongest Man injured, but after a valiant fight, won the title for a record breaking fourth time. The American O.D. Wilson who was leading the competition with a comfortable five and a half points leading up to the last event (a 200 m race with a 100 kg weight on the back) lacked the endurance to complete the course quickly enough, giving up six points to Jón Páll, earning him the win at the final event. He also won World Muscle Power Classic and Iceland's Strongest Man.

=== 1991–1992 ===
In 1991 Jón Páll won his fifth World Muscle Power Classic, but badly injured his left arm during Nordic Strongest Man in Denmark. He underwent an operation at a hospital in Scotland but the bones of his forearm grew together, which prevented the full use of his arm thereafter. In 1992 won his fifth Iceland's Strongest Man title as well as Finland's Strongest Man. Both in 1991 and 1992 he missed the World's Strongest Man due to recurring injuries.

==== Rivalry with Kazmaier ====
Jón Páll was often challenged by Kazmaier in static feats of strength because he believed events were biased in Jón Páll's favour. Despite battling with injuries, Jón Páll's mobility reduced but it progressively translated into improved brute strength. In 1981 when Kazmaier traveled to Nigeria for a Highland games style strength exhibition with Douglas Edmunds, he attempted to break his own deadlift world record by pulling 415 kg (915 lb) with straps. He was successful, however it was not considered an official record since it was a slightly elevated deadlift. During his preparation for 1987 Pure Strength, Jón Páll replicated the same setup and pulled 427.5 kg (942 lb) in his gym 'Gym 80' in front of many Icelandic spectators.

== Personal life and death ==
Although he was known for his energetic, charismatic and boastful personality when competing, Jón Páll was known for his vibrant personality, humor and soft-spoken nature in his personal life. He was also an avid reader and enjoyed reading to his son Sigmar Freyr (born 1983).

On 16 January 1993, Jón Páll died of an aortic rupture while deadlifting in his gym 'Gym 80' in Reykjavík. It was the result of a congenital heart defect that also affected three other members of his family which may have also been exacerbated by his use of anabolic steroids. Jón Páll had sought medical treatment in the United States in 1992 due to persisting heart problems. Sölvi Tryggvason stated in his 2013 biography of Jón Páll that he suspected Jón Páll knew he was close to death.

Jón Páll is buried at the Lágafell church cemetery.

== Legacy ==
Jón Páll was described in his life documentary "Larger than Life" by Geoff Capes as "a new kind of guy on the block" and by David P. Webster equally in describing him as a man who boasted pure static strength as well as versatile athletic strength in all its forms, a combination that led to his supreme performances. World's Strongest Man Director Colin Bryce called Jón Páll the greatest strongman of all time for not only his titles but also showmanship, stating "Strongman is entertainment. None of us would be here without Jón Páll".

Jón Páll's lifelong friend and training partner Hjalti Árnason created the Jón Páll Sigmarsson Classic international strongman contest in 2010 in honor of Jón Páll. The event was held annually for three consecutive years during the Icelandic fitness & health expo in Reykjavík. The inaugural winner was America's Brian Shaw and the final winner was Iceland's own Hafþór Júlíus Björnsson. Hafþór also has a tattoo of Jón Páll lifting a natural stone in one of his calves.

In New Hampshire, United States, there is a popular lifting stone weighing 221 kg (487 lb) named after Jón Páll which is used in some New England Highland Games. One of his legendary quotes 'Þetta er ekkert mál fyrir Jón Pál!' (This is no problem for Jón Páll!), is inscribed in the stone.

== Personal records ==
=== Powerlifting ===
performed in official powerlifting full meets, aged 23, in single-ply equipment

- Squat – 365 kg (805 lb) in 80s marathon squat suit (KRAFT Icelandic Invitational, Dec 1984)
- Bench press – 235 kg (518 lb) (KRAFT Icelandic Invitational, Dec 1984)
- Deadlift – 370 kg (816 lb) (KRAFT Icelandic Invitational, Dec 1984)

→ former European record in 125 class (+regardless of weight class) for the 4th time

- Total – 970 kg (2,138 lb) (365 + 235 + 370 kg (805 + 518 + 816 lb)) (KRAFT Icelandic Invitational, Dec 1984)

→ First Icelander to break the 900 and 950 barriers

performed as exhibition lifts

- Squat – 390 kg (860 lb) raw
- Bench press – 247.5 kg (546 lb) in early prototype bench shirt
- Deadlift – 400 kg (882 lb) raw (1986)
- Career aggregate powerlifting total (unofficial) – 1,037.5 kg (2,287 lb)

=== Strongman ===
- Deadlift (Raw with straps) – 427.5 kg (942 lb) (During training, 1987) (Unofficial World Record)

→ This lift surpassed Bill Kazmaier's 415 kg (915 lb) Highland games deadlift of 1981. However both were not considered official deadlift records because the weights and setup used did not allow the bar to stay at the standard 9 inches off the floor, making them slightly elevated deadlifts. Weightwise, it was not surpassed until 2005 by Benedikt Magnússon.

- Rectangular-handled Cartwheel Deadlift – 523 kg (1,153 lb) (1987 Pure Strength) (Former World Record)

→ Eventhough it was surpassed in 2015 by Hafþór Júlíus Björnsson, it still remains the heaviest weight ever pulled with a rectangular bar.

- Ox-cart Deadlift – 515 kg (1,135 lb) (1985 World's Strongest Man) (Former World Record)
- Cheese Deadlift (Silver dollar setup) – 525 kg (1,157 lb) (1983 World's Strongest Man) (Former World Record)
- One arm Deadlift (Raw without wrist straps) – 250 kg (551 lb) (Date unknown) (former world record)
- Log lift – 163.5 kg (360 lb) (1987 Pure Strength) (Former World Record)
- Húsafell Stone carry – 186 kg (410 lb) for 54.96 metres (180 ft 4 in) (Date unknown)

→ Jón Páll was also famous for dancing with the Húsafell Stone in 1985 Iceland's Strongest Man

- McGlashen Stone loading – 5 stones ranging from 95–140 kg (209–309 lb) on top of 5 whiskey barrels in 27.45 seconds (1988 World's Strongest Man) (World Record)

→ Jón Páll is also the first man to load a 150 kg (331 lb) McGlashen stone which he did in 1986 Commonwealth Games

- McGlashen Stone to shoulder – 125 kg (276 lb) x 6 times (1989 World's Strongest Man) (Former World Record) and 100 kg (220 lb) x 11 times (1989 World's Strongest Man) (World Record)
- Rock press – 125 kg (276 lb) (1984 World's Strongest Man)
- Weight over bar – 25.5 kg (56 lb) over 5.26 metres (17 ft 3 in) (1987 Pure Strength) (Former Joint-World Record)
- Keg toss – 25 kg (55 lb) over 4.88 metres (16 ft 0 in) (1986 Le Défi Mark Ten International) (Former World Record)
- Caber toss – 36 kg (79 lb) for 17.29 metres (56 ft 9 in) on ice surface (1984 World's Strongest Man) (World Record)
- Claymore front hold (horizontal w/ one arm) – 7 kg (15 lb) for 71.00 seconds (1987 Pure Strength) (World Record)
- Brick carry – 100 kg (220 lb) for 200m course in 50.05 seconds (1990 World's Strongest Man) (World Record)
- Wheelbarrow push – 1,361 kg (3,000 lb) for 10 ft (1986 Le Défi Mark Ten International) (World Record)
- Arm over arm vertical lift (wool hoist) with free drop – 200 kg (441 lb) for 3.00 metres (9 ft 10 in) height (1983 World's Strongest Man) (World Record)
- Arm over arm uphill Cannon pull – 590 kg (1,301 lb) for 15m course in 23.11 seconds (1987 Pure Strength) (World Record)
- William Grant Whiskey bottle bear hug lift – 220 kg (485 lb) (1987 Guinness World of Records, London) (World Record)

== Competition history ==
=== Strongman ===
- World's Strongest Man
  - 1983 - 2nd
  - 1984 - 1st
  - 1985 - 2nd
  - 1986 - 1st
  - 1988 - 1st
  - 1989 - 3rd
  - 1990 - 1st
- World Muscle Power Championship
  - 1985 - 1st
  - 1986 - 1st
  - 1987 - 2nd
  - 1988 - 3rd
  - 1989 - 1st
  - 1990 - 1st
  - 1991 - 1st
- Europe's Strongest Man
  - 1983 - 3rd
  - 1985 - 1st
  - 1986 - 1st
  - 1987 - 3rd
  - 1988 - 2nd
  - 1989 - 3rd
  - 1990 - 4th
  - 1992 - 4th
- Other contests
  - 1982 Scandinavian Strongest Man - 1st
  - 1985 Le Defi Mark Ten (Canada) - 3rd
  - 1986 Le Defi Mark Ten (Canada) - 2nd
  - 1987 Le Defi Mark Ten (Canada) - 5th
  - 1987 Japan Grand Prix - 2nd
  - 1987 Pure Strength - 1st
  - 1989 Corby Great Eccleston (England) - 1st
  - 1989 Iceland's Kraftur Contest - 1st
  - 1990 Nissan Power Cup - 1st
  - 1990 European Muscle Power Championship
  - 1991 European Hercules - 2nd
  - 1992 European Hercules - 6th
  - Iceland's Strongest Man winner - 1985, 1986, 1987, 1990, 1992
  - Finland's Strongest Man winner - 1989
  - Finnish nationals winner - 1992

=== Powerlifting ===
- 1980 European Powerlifting Championships - 2nd
- 1981 European Powerlifting Championships - 2nd
- 1981 World Powerlifting Championships - 3rd
- 1983 European Powerlifting Championships - 1st

=== Olympic weightlifting ===
- 1980 Icelandic Olympic weightlifting Championships - 1st

=== Highland games ===
- 1986 Carmunnock Highland Games (Scotland) - 7th
- 1986 Commonwealth Highland Games (Scotland) - 1st
