= Maxalding =

Exercise system

Maxalding is an exercise system of muscle control using a form of isometrics. Books and pamphlets teaching the system were first published in 1909 and continued until Maxalding ceased to trade in the late 1970s.

== System ==
The Maxalding system, like the "dynamic tension" system of Charles Atlas and those of others, did not use weights. Where the other systems concentrated on muscle development, Maxalding went one stage further and taught muscle control. The methods taught had been around since the early 1900s and indeed many of the photos used in the instruction leaflets, even those sold in the 1970s, date from that period. Some exercises of Maxalding, involving isolating the muscles of the abdominal region, are similar to the yoga exercise of nauli.

== Founders ==
Maxalding (originally called Maxaldo) was a name created from those of the founders, Maxick (Max Sick) and Monte Saldo (Alfred Montague Woollaston), and first came into being in 1909.

Maxick was an Austrian strongman. He was born in Bregenz in Austria on 28 June 1882, and moved to Britain in 1909, where he met Saldo. He died in Buenos Aires on 10 May 1961 after a wrist-wrestling match. The Maxalding principles are based mainly on exercises and techniques which appeared in his book Muscle Control, written in 1911.

Saldo was apprenticed to Eugen Sandow in 1897. He took his stage name at the turn of the 20th century while touring Europe demonstrating strength and gymnastics. He was also an artist's model and in 1914 published a book called How to Pose. He provided the financial means of promoting Maxick's methods and starting the Maxalding postal course. His son F. H. C. Woollaston took over, using the professional name of Courtlandt Saldo. He carried on the business until sometime in the late 1970s. Courtlandt Saldo died in 1983 at the age of 72.

== See also ==
- Tony Holland (bodybuilder)
