= The Montague Brothers =

The Montague Brothers c.1906

The Montague Brothers was a strongman act of the early twentieth century made up of the three Woollaston brothers, Edwin John Woollaston (1876-1918), Alfred Montague Woollaston (Monte Saldo), and Frank Harold Woollaston (Frank Saldo). In the act, the Brothers displayed acts of strength including supporting a heavy motor car complete with passengers and 'The Sculptor's Dream'.

Taking its name from the middle name of the act's founder, Alfred Montague Woollaston (Monte Saldo), 'The Montague Brothers' grew out of the strongman act 'Ronco & Monte' - both of whom had served apprenticeships with famed strongman and bodybuilder Eugen Sandow. On 'Ronco & Monte' breaking up Monte Saldo then teamed up with his younger brother Frank Woollaston, and the new strongman act opened at the Hippodrome in London, followed by a European tour. During the tour the brothers appeared in Amsterdam, Dresden, Hamburg, Saxony, Prague and Paris, at the latter city regularly working out in the gymnasium of Edmond Desbonnet. On their return, they appeared for a season at the London Pavilion.

In 1903 Monte Saldo added a new routine to the act which was designed to draw in large audiences, during which he supported a heavy motor car in the "Tomb of Hercules" position. Having prepared and rehearsed carefully, on stage a Darracq full of passengers has driven up a ramp and onto a bridge, where the ramp and supports were removed leaving Saldo supporting the entire weight of the vehicle and its contents on a section of the bridge. Later, the act was refined, with Saldo supporting the car on top of a ten foot high revolving platform. This act was taken on another international tour, for which Saldo received the largest salary ever paid to a one-man strongman act.

== The Sculptor's Dream ==
In 1906 Monte Saldo refined the act even further, teaming up again with his brother Frank Woollaston (now known as Frank Saldo) and older brother Edwin, the three of them billing themselves as "The Montague Brothers", and performing a new routine called "The Sculptor's Dream".

A theatrical poster for 'The Sculptor's Dream' (1906)

The act was described by Alexander Zass thus:

"... a real strongman, and a clever weightlifter to boot was Monte Saldo, whose stage showmanship was best displayed, perhaps, in a turn which he presented with his brother Frank, entitled "the Sculptor's Dream," certainly of the most artistic and impressive of any ever given.

The curtain rose to disclose a sculptor's studio, with the sculptor at work on a reproduction of a well known classical statue. The figure was Monte himself, painted and garbed in an excellent imitation of marble, and behind him was a mirror, in which the statue could be seen reproduced. After working a while, the sculpture wearied, and concealing his masterpiece behind curtains, stretched himself at length upon a couch, soon to be ostensibly asleep. The curtains thereupon parted on their own account, revealing the statue in another classical pose, again reflected in the mirror. Then once more they closed, only to re-open and repeat their re-opening to the revelation of ever fresh poses and reflections, until finally the statue and the mirror reflection confront each other in a famous wrestler's attitude.

A pause, and then the mirror crashing as the 'reflection' - brother Frank, to be more explicit - leapt out to grapple with Monte, and execute on stage a variety of wrestling postures. This unique opening was followed by a series of equally novel strength feats in which both iron and human weights figured, closured by Monte pressing Frank aloft with one hand, and a twirl round of the supported performer. This twirl, by the way, was very smartly done. As Frank leant back to be supported on Monte's palm, the lifter would interpose a revolving disc on which his brother's back rested. Thus when Frank had been pressed aloft, it enabled Monte to spin him.

At this juncture, the sculptor would commence stirring, whereupon both statue and 'reflection' would leap back and, resuming their original poses, thus satisfying the now awakened chiseller of marble that all which had transpired was actually nothing but a dream.

Monte Saldo was one of the few men who have enhanced a reputation made on the stage as a strongman by feats performed away from its atmosphere of glamour and make-believe. The first man in the world to 'swing' over his own bodyweight with one hand, and one of the most successful trainers of strong men ever known..."

The Entr'acte said of this new routine, "An absolutely original athletic act is given by the Montague Brothers. Their performance is entitled 'The Sculptor's Dream' and provides the most original setting we have ever seen, being athletic and at the same time effective when it comes to feats of strength pure and simple. Their work is simply amazing." The sculptor was played by Edwin John Woollaston, the duo's older brother.

The act broke up in about 1909, with Monte Saldo opening a gym with William Bankier ('Apollo, the Scottish Hercules'), while Frank Saldo went into physical training and teaching. Older brother Edwin John Woollaston died in 1918.
