= Max Sick =

German gymnast and bodybuilder

Maxick
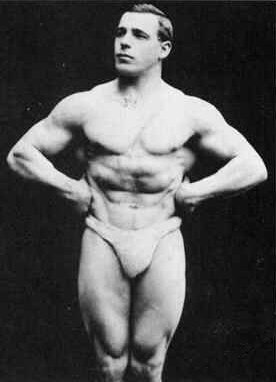
- Born: June 28, 1882; Bregenz, Austria-Hungary
- Died: October 5, 1961 (aged 79); Buenos Aires, Argentina
- Occupations: Strongman, bodybuilder, gymnast

Max Sick (28 June 1882 – 10 May 1961) was a German strongman and gymnast who performed as Maxick. With Monte Saldo, he developed the Maxalding system of bodybuilding through muscle control.

== Early life ==
Born in Bregenz in Austria in 1882 to Swiss parents, Sick's father died at the age of 24, and his mother then married a Bavarian, Herr Sick; later Max Sick became a naturalized German citizen. Between the ages of two and five, Max Sick was unusually weak, suffering with lung problems, rickets and dropsy. His illnesses affected him so severely that he only learned to walk at the age of six. Aged 10 he made his own weights and created his own regime of physical exercise and fitness. However, his parents opposed his weightlifting and destroyed his homemade weights.

Determined to develop his body despite this setback, Sick began a series of muscle control exercises. In 1896, at the age of 14 he had made such strides in his physical development that he was invited to join the local athletics club. For a while he served in the army. Sick trained as a mechanic at a local engineering works but at the age of 23 he left that employment and decided on a career that could better use his physical attributes, moving to Munich where he joined a gymnasium and where he quickly found work as an artist's model. He was just under 163 cm (5 ft 4 in) tall and weighed around 67 kg (148 lb).

== Strongman ==
Maxick c.1910

Sick began to appear in German music halls, and as part of his stage routine he would make his various groups of muscles twitch in time to music. Reputedly, he also would take a man 20 kg (44 lb) heavier than himself and lift him into the air sixteen times with one hand, while holding a mug of beer in the other hand without spilling it. His tremendous physique made him a very popular performer.

After Tromp Van Diggelen, the South African physical culturalist and founder of the British Amateur Weightlifter's Association (BAWLA), saw Sick's stage act he went to London where he persuaded Eugen Sandow to invite Sick to appear in England. Accordingly, on October 26, 1909, Sick arrived in London, where he quickly became a serious contender for the world professional middleweight weightlifting title. However, Thomas Inch, the then middleweight champion, was quickly putting on weight and did not think he would meet the middleweight limit by the time of the match. By early 1910 Inch had been recategorized as a heavyweight and so relinquished his middleweight title to Edward Aston, and a competition was quickly arranged between Aston and Sick. Maxick, as he was now known, made his British lifting debut on 19 January 1910, displaying a much-admired double bodyweight continental clean and jerk.

The match against Edward Aston took place at the Granville Music Hall in Fulham on 4 August 1910, the stake being £100 and a silver trophy. During the competition Maxick strained his shoulder in attempting 212 1/2 and 207 3/4 lbs. in the one hand clean and jerk. However, despite this injury he carried on with the match and managed a two hands clean with 264 lbs. but failed to hold the jerk and had to withdraw from the competition. A rematch held at the Holborn Empire on the afternoon of 14 December 1910 was indecisive as the competition had to be abandoned to allow an evening theatrical performance to take place on the stage.

Although Maxick stated that he had developed his very incredible physique and strength with the aid of muscle control, he was also an expert weightlifter. He was capable of a clean and jerk with twice his bodyweight. He was also an accomplished gymnast and hand balancer. Maxick later became business partners with strongmen Monte Saldo and William Bankier. He wrote many books on muscle control and the muscle control courses he developed with Monte Saldo were still being sold into the 1970s under the name of Maxalding. In 1913, he visited Tromp van Diggelen in South Africa where he gave demonstrations of his skills.

On the outbreak of World War I, Maxick was voluntarily interned in England as an enemy alien. He did not want to return to his native land and enlist, as he refused to serve under "Prussian bullies". On being released at the end of the war, he traveled the world, eventually returning to his homeland only to leave again when the Nazis came to power in 1933. He then left to explore Central and South America, finally settling in Buenos Aires.

== Final years ==
Maxick died aged nearly 80 in Buenos Aires in 1961, where he ran a gym and health studio. On the day he died he had been wrist wrestling with a friend and then rode his bicycle home. He was later found dead lying apparently relaxed on his back, arms outstretched and a carefully folded farewell note under his right heel, on which he had written, “My heart is beating rather slow, I feel extremely cold, I think it will be over soon. Remember the infinite is our freedom manifested through our consciousness”.

== Publications ==
- Muscle Control (1910)
- Health Strength and Will Power (with Monte Saldo)
