= Vulcana =

Welsh strongwoman (1875–1946)

Miriam Katy Williams
- Professional bodybuilder
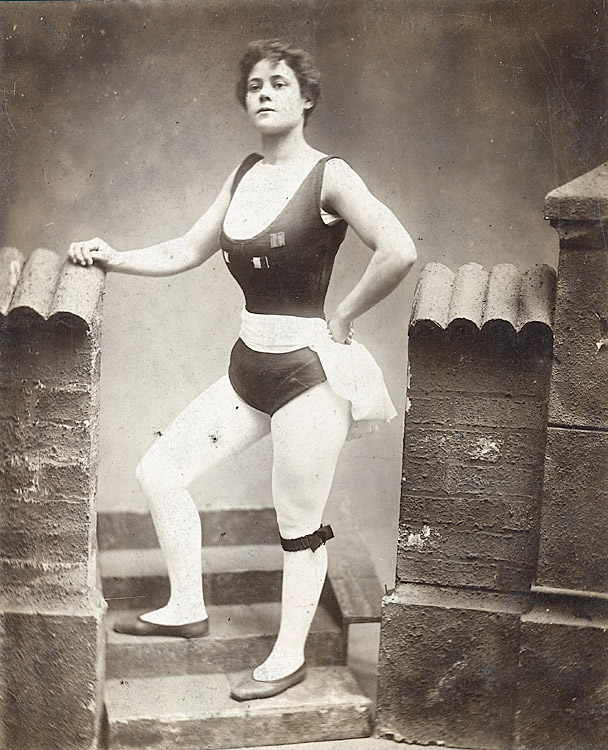
- Vulcana in 1900

Personal info
- Nickname: Vulcana, Kate Roberts, Welsh strongwoman
- Born: 6 May 1874; Abergavenny, Wales
- Died: 8 August 1946 (aged 72); London, England

Best statistics

Professional (Pro) career
- Best win: La Santé par les Sport; 100 medals through her career
- Active: Retired 1932

Miriam Kate Williams (6 May 1874 – 8 August 1946) sometimes called Kate Roberts and better known by her stage name Vulcana, was a Welsh strongwoman. With strongman William Hedley Roberts, better known as Atlas, she toured music halls in Britain, Europe, and Australia. The couple performed as The Atlas and Vulcana Group of Society Athletes.

== Early life ==
Kate Williams was born to Irish parents in Abergavenny, Monmouthshire; her father was a local preacher. Kate worked at a tannery in Abergavenny as a young woman. She met William Roberts at the local women's gymnasium he ran in 1890, when she was fifteen. They fell in love; in spite of Roberts already having a wife and family, they left town together and were never parted for the rest of their lives.

== Performing career ==
Williams's first professional appearance was as a replacement act at a fete hosted by Roberts in Pontypool, Wales. They began to be billed together as Atlas and Vulcana from the time of their first appearances in London in 1892. In 1903, Vulcana and Atlas were engaged by Harry Rickards and toured Australia. Atlas, a true showman of his times, greatly exaggerated his own and Vulcana's lifting capacities, and most of his published boasts have been dismissed. On more than one occasion, he was challenged to his face and shown to be using weights lighter than he claimed. At these times, Vulcana's reputation suffered alongside his, although her authenticated accomplishments were genuinely remarkable for a woman of her era.

=== Authenticated feats of strength ===
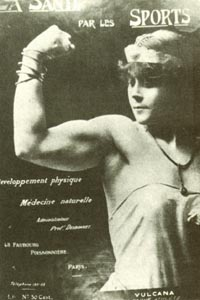
Vulcana flexing on the cover of La Santé par les Sports

Vulcana reached the height of her popularity in France, impressing the Halterophile Club de France with her feats of strength, which earned her a medal from the "Father of French Bodybuilding", Professor Edmond Desbonnet and a picture on the cover of La Santé par les Sports. She was honored with over one hundred medals throughout her career.

Her best-authenticated feats were bent press with her right hand of at least 124½ lb (56.5 kg), with some authorities accepting a press of 145 lb (66 kg), and an overhead lift with a 56 lb (25 kg) weight in each hand.

She freed a wagon stuck in Maiden Lane, Covent Garden, London in October 1901 by lifting it before astonished witnesses.

Authorities believe Vulcana reached the peak of her strength in about 1910. On 29 May 1913 at Haggar's Theatre in Llanelli, she lifted a challenge bell that rival strongwoman Athelda (Frances Rheinlander) failed to raise

=== Authenticated feats of heroism ===
A woman publicly displaying strength was sufficient to generate succès de scandale, as publicity stunts were then called, and Vulcana was no stranger to the art of aggrandizing tales of her exploits. However, some of the stories about her are based on genuine incidents of heroism on her part:

- In 1888, at the age of thirteen, she stopped a runaway horse in Bristol.
- She rescued two children from drowning in the River Usk in July 1901, for which she received an award in gratitude.
- In 1910, Vulcana was the first to alert the police of the disappearance of her friend, Cora Crippen, who performed as Belle Ellmore, ultimately leading to the investigation, prosecution and execution of Cora's husband, Dr. Hawley Crippen.
- On 4 June 1921 the Garrick Theatre in Edinburgh caught fire on an evening of the Society Athletes' performance. Vulcana risked her life to save another act's horses, and came away with serious burns on her head. For this she won commendations and an award.

=== Reported feats ===
- In 1902, Punch reported that Vulcana had knocked out a pickpocket who was attempting to steal her purse.

=== Retirement ===
Vulcana and Atlas moved permanently to London in the 1920s, and retired from performance in 1932.

Vulcana was hit by a car in London in 1939, and was conscious when she heard her own death pronounced. She suffered brain damage, but partially recovered, and briefly outlived Atlas and her youngest daughter, both of whom also died in 1946.

== Family ==
Vulcana and Atlas never married one another, and they billed themselves as brother and sister throughout their careers. They did however have six children together, William, Hedley, Augustus, Arthur, Nora, and Mona (1900 – 1946). No scandal resulted, as their secret was not discovered during their lifetimes.

Vulcana did not want her children left with relatives or in orphanages, and insisted on raising them herself. Thus, all of her children performed with the Society Athletes as soon as they were old enough.

Nora Roberts would go on to appear in the film Things to Come (1936).

== Legacy ==
The Vulcana Women's Circus, based in Brisbane, Australia, is named after her.
