= Siegmund Klein =

American bodybuilder and gymnasium owner

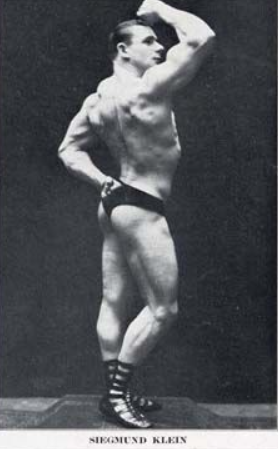
- Klein in 1933
- Born: April 10, 1902; Toruń, Germany
- Died: May 24, 1987 (aged 85); New York, New York
- Known for: Bodybuilding
- Spouse: Grace Attila (m. 1927)
- Children: 1
- Relatives: Ludwig Durlacher (father-in-law)

Siegmund Klein (April 10, 1902 – May 24, 1987) was a German-American strongman, bodybuilder, magazine publisher, and gymnasium owner prominent in physical culture. He was inducted into the IFBB Hall of Fame in 2006.

== Early life ==
"Sig" Klein was born in 1902 in Toruń, Germany (now within Poland), and his family moved to Cleveland, Ohio a year later. A reader of strength magazines, and admirer of his father's muscular arms, Klein began his own weight training at age 12 with an improvised use of window counterweights. By age 17, he was training with a standard set of 100-pound barbells.

== Gymnasiums in New York ==
In 1924, Klein arrived in New York City and arranged to take over operation of a gymnasium previously owned by Louis Attila, the inventor of the bent press weight training exercise and trainer of pioneering bodybuilder Eugen Sandow. Klein met and later married Attila's daughter Grace. In July 1926, he arranged for Tony Sansone to continue running Attila's gym, and Klein opened his own gym at 207 West 48th Street/717 Seventh Avenue. At only 30 feet (9.1 m) by 40 feet (12 m), Klein's "Physical Culture Studio" became one of the most well-known gyms in the U.S. in the 1940s and 1950s, and many photo shoots for Joe Weider's magazines were conducted there. He closed his gym for the first time in November 1968 to attend Bob Hoffman's 70th birthday party; it closed permanently after 48 years of operation (circa 1974), though the building was still in use as of 2016.

== Written work ==
Klein published his own magazine, Klein's Bell, from June 1931 to December 1932, when it merged with Bob Hoffman's new Strength & Health, for which Klein began writing in 1933. In addition to Hoffman's and Weider's magazines, Klein was on the covers of Iron Man, Vim, Edmond Desbonnet's La Culture Physique, and Bernarr Macfadden's Physical Culture magazine.

Regarding the regularity of working out, he held the belief that once a bodybuilder is in good shape with sensibly developed muscles, it doesn't take a lot of training to keep it. Referring to himself as an example, Klein wrote in 1969 that his last heavy lifting was at age 35 and he had continued to work out just three times a week from then on, with hour-long sessions.

== Later life and legacy ==
The organization that became the Association of Oldtime Barbell and Strongmen (AOBS) began with Vic Boff, Leo Murdock, and others putting together a surprise 80th birthday party for Klein in 1982. The strong interest by attendees at this and several followup events solidified the formation of a group that honors old time champions and preserves weightlifting history.

Klein died of cancer in 1987 at age 85, survived by his wife and a daughter. He is described in Arnold Schwarzenegger's Encyclopedia of Modern Bodybuilding as a pioneer in giving value to physique, beyond strength alone, as a demonstration of physical health.
