= Saldo =

Saldo is a surname. Notable people with the surname include:

- Frank Saldo and Monte Saldo, stage names of the brothers Frank Harold Woollaston (1882–1939) and Alfred Montague Woollaston (1879–1949), early British bodybuilders
- Vladimir Saldo (born 1956), a Russian and Ukrainian politician who has served since 26 April 2022 as the head of the Kherson military–civilian administration in Russian-occupied Ukraine
