= The Strongest Man in History =

- Genre: Reality
- Country of origin: United States
- No. of seasons: 1
- No. of episodes: 7

Production
- Executive producers: Tara Long, Rick Hughes, Chris Deaux, Rob Worsoff, Brian Wendel, Mary Donahue, Jennifer Wagman
- Running time: 39–42 minutes
- Production companies: Entertainment One & Two Fifteen West Entertainment

Original release
- Network: History
- Release: July 7 – August 14, 2019

The Strongest Man in History is a History Channel original series, which premiered on July 7, 2019. It is a reality-show that takes four strongmen, Nick Best, Eddie Hall, Robert Oberst and Brian Shaw around the world investigating some of the most famous strongmen legends and trying to beat those performances and verify the credibility of some of the legendary feats of strength.

The first and only season consisted of seven episodes which spanned across both USA and UK.

== Strongmen ==
- Nick Best
  World's Strongest Man finalist, power-lifting champion of the world in the late 1990s and held the world records in the Shield carry (Elephant shield) and Stone carry (Jón Páll Sigmarsson stone).
- Eddie Hall
  2017 World's Strongest Man winner and held the former world record for the Deadlift, at 500 kg (1,102 lb).
- Robert Oberst
  World's Strongest Man finalist and held the former American record for the log press at 211 kg (465 lb).
- Brian Shaw
  2011, 2013, 2015 and 2016 World's Strongest Man champion and held more than 25 world records.

== Episodes ==
=== Season 1 (2019) ===
No. overall	No. in season	Title	Original release date
1	1	"Stronger than a Viking"	July 7, 2019
In the bitter cold of Moorhead, Minnesota, the four strongmen struggle to test their strength against Vikings legends attempting to lift and carry a 345 lb. stone, seeing who can throw Thor's hammer the farthest, pulling a vintage Viking ship weighing 12,000 lb. uphill, and replicating Icelandic strongman Orm Storolfsson's feat of lifting a 1,433 lb. Viking ship mast.
2	2	"Stronger than a Russian"	July 10, 2019
The four strongmen are in Toccoa, Georgia, home of Paul Anderson – the Godfather of American strength – to perform some of his legendary feats such as, squatting 15,000 silver dollars weighing 720 lb., an overhead press of 406 lb., and a 2,700 lb. carousel hip lift that made Paul famous on The Ed Sullivan Show.
3	3	"One Ton Lift"	July 17, 2019
The four strongmen are in the United Kingdom, home of Eddie Hall and Britain's original strongman, Thomas Topham. To honor Topham, the strongmen carry a 280 lb. watchtower .3 miles before throwing it over a fence, roll up a pewter plate and frying pan, and do a 1,345 lb. barrel lift before upping the stakes to 2,028 lb.
4	4	"Strongmen Go West"	July 24, 2019
The four strongmen are in Cody, Wyoming, to look at "Apollo, the Scottish Hercules," William Bankier, who performed with Buffalo Bill's Rough Riders in Cody during the 1880s. To honor Bankier, the strongmen lift a 130 lb. plow one-handed, lift a 1,000 lb. hay bale, carry a 400 lb. bag, and carry a 600 lb. piano on their backs while racing down Main Street.
5	5	"Stronger than a Scotsman"	July 31, 2019
The four strongmen are in Braemar, Scotland, at the Highland Games to look at some of the feats of strongman Donald Dinnie. Challenges include trying to throw a 28 lb. Braemar Stone more than 31' 7", attempting the caber toss and keg toss before finally carrying the 733 lb. Dinnie Stones across the Potarch Bridge where a world record will be broken.
6	6	"Strongmen Go to Vegas"	August 7, 2019
The strongmen are in Las Vegas, Nevada, home of Nick Best, to take on the feats of strongman Monte Saldo. Challenges include a one-arm press of 525 lb., seeing who can hold a cinder block weighing 35 lb. at 90 degrees the longest, flipping 800 lb. tires, leg pressing a 1926 Model T weighing 2,075 lb., and dead lifting a Ford Mustang.
7	7	"Revolutionary Strongmen"	August 14, 2019
The strongmen are in Virginia to take on the unbelievable feats of strength of American Revolution soldier Peter Francisco. The strongmen see who can throw eight 250 lb crates of tea into the river the fastest, then who can carry blacksmith apprentice tools, such as anvils and 500 lb. of metal rods, in the quickest time. Finally, the strongmen attempt to match Francisco's feat of lifting and carrying a 350 lb cannon from the battlefield.
