= Frank Saldo =

British bodybuilder

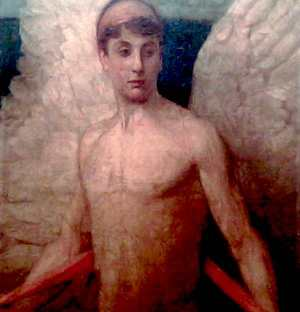
Frank Saldo as Icarus. Painted by Albert Herter c. 1901

Frank Saldo (born Frank Harold Woollaston; 10 July 1882 – 1 June 1939) was an early bodybuilder, and with his brothers Monte Saldo and Edwin Woollaston was a member of the strongman act The Montague Brothers in the early twentieth century.

== Early years ==
Born in Holloway in London, the son of George Frederick Woollaston (1828–1896), a shoe manufacturer, Methodist preacher and faith healer, and Adelaide Mary (née Green) (1849–1923), like his older brother Monte, Frank Saldo developed an interest in physical culture at a young age and with his brother travelled in the stage act of Eugen Sandow in the late 1890s. In 1901 he went to the Sorbonne to study physiology. While in Paris he modelled for a portrait of Icarus for the artist Albert Herter. Returning to London, from 1901 to 1902 he was at the Crystal Palace School of Physical Training in South London where he studied remedial exercises.

== Stage career ==
In 1903 he joined his brothers Monte (Alfred Montague Woollaston) and Edwin John Woollaston (1876–1918) to create the stage act "The Montague Brothers", and the new strongman act opened at the Hippodrome in London. During the tour the brothers appeared in Amsterdam, Dresden, Hamburg, Saxony, Prague and Paris, at the latter city regularly working out in the gymnasium of Edmond Desbonnet. On their return they appeared for a season at the London Pavilion. In 1906 one of their new routines was "The Sculptor's Dream".

A theatrical poster for "The Sculptor's Dream" (1906)

The act was described by Alexander Zass thus:

"... The curtain rose disclosing a sculptor's studio, with the sculptor (Edwin Woollaston) at work on a reproduction of a well known classical statue. The figure was Monte himself, painted and garbed in an excellent imitation of marble, and behind him was a mirror, in which the statue could be seen reproduced. After working a while, the sculpture wearied, and concealing his masterpiece behind curtains, stretched himself at length upon a couch, soon to be ostensibly asleep. The curtains thereupon parted on their own account, revealing the statue in another classical pose, again reflected in the mirror. Then once more they closed, only to re-open and repeat their re-opening to revelation of ever fresh poses and reflections, until finally the statue and the mirror reflection confront each other in a famous wrestler's attitude.
A pause, and then the mirror crashing as the 'reflection' – brother Frank, to be more explicit – leapt out to grapple with Monte, and execute on stage a variety of wrestling postures. This unique opening was followed by a series of equally novel strength feats in which both iron and human weights figured, closured by Monte pressing Frank aloft with one hand, and a twirl round of the supported performer. This twirl, by the way, was very smartly done. As Frank leant back to be supported on Monte's palm, the lifter would interpose a revolving disc on which his brother's back rested. Thus when Frank had been pressed aloft, it enabled Monte to spin him.
At this juncture, the sculptor would commence to stir, whereupon both statue and 'reflection' would leap back and, resuming their original poses, thus satisfying the now awakened chiseller of marble that all which had transpired was actually nothing but a dream..."

The Entr'acte said of this routine, "An absolutely original athletic act is given by the Montague Brothers. Their performance is entitled 'The Sculptor's Dream' and provides the most original setting we have ever seen, being athletic and at the same time effective when it comes to feats of strength pure and simple. Their work is simply amazing."

== Later years ==
Frank Saldo left the act to concentrate on writing lyrics, going on to work successfully with the pianist Courtlandt Palmer, among others. Saldo wrote the lyrics for a song for Dame Nellie Melba before moving to the United States for a period where he had a successful career as a lyricist. He wrote the lyrics for the musical Victoria Amoris, which was performed in New York. Later he also travelled extensively in Europe.

During the First World War Saldo served in the Royal Army Medical Corps and was based at Frensham Hill Military Hospital. He was not sent to the front owing to health reasons caused by gastric problems. Leaving the army in 1919 with the rank of Sergeant, from 1920 until his death in 1939 Saldo was employed as a lecturer in physical training at Goldsmiths College, part of the University of London. Here he was President of the Homers and Diggers Society, and was Treasurer of the college's Dramatic Society. In 1922 he was awarded a qualification in hygiene and won a travelling scholarship to Scandinavia where he visited physical training institutes and schools. At about this time he became a Member of the Royal Institute of Public Health and Hygiene.

His nephew Court Saldo wrote of him:

"Frank forsook the footlights and strongman sphere after serving in World War I, and proving that he had brains as well as brawn, became a lecturer on physical education at the University of London. Those University students who remember him as Frank H Woollaston MIH, leading light in so many sports organisations and for 12 years president of the University Boxing Association, might be surprised to know that as Frank Saldo he was once a noted muscle man of the Sandow era, a Health & Strength Magazine cover man and, like his famous brother Monte, had lived, travelled and appeared on stage with the great Eugen Sandow while still a youth."

He married Gertrude Ethel (née Timmins) (1885–1965) in 1914. Their daughter Marion Ethel Francis Palmer (née Woollaston) (1916–2006) became a medical doctor and married a Member of Parliament.

Frank Saldo died in the Middlesex Hospital in June 1939 aged 57 following a stroke.
