= Anthony Holland =

Anthony, Antony or Tony Holland may refer to:

- Anthony Henry Holland (1785–1830), Nova Scotia businessman and printer
- Anthony Holland (actor) (1928–1988), American actor
- Antony Holland (1920–2015), English actor, playwright, and theatre director
- Tony Holland (1940–2007), English television screenwriter
- Tony Holland (bodybuilder) (born 1939), British bodybuilder
