= Physical Culture =

Physical culture was a health and fitness movement started in the 19th century.

Physical Culture may also refer to:

- Physical Culture (1899 – c. 1951), an American magazine founded by Bernarr Macfadden
- Indian physical culture
- Sandow's Magazine of Physical Culture (1898–1907), a British magazine, name expanded from Physical Culture in 1899
- Western physical culture, the general history of Western fitness practices
