= Vulcana Women's Circus =

Australian circus founded in 1995

Vulcana Circus is an Australian circus, created with the aim of training women, trans women, and non binary adults, and children and teens of all genders in the circus arts. The company was founded in 1995 at West End in Brisbane, by Antonella Casella in Brisbane, Australia, the company was named after the famous British strongwoman Vulcana.

The company has three main activities, which often overlap.

- "Vulcademy" - an in-house circus school open to women, trans and non binary people over the age of 18
- "Vulcana Youth" - an in-house circus school open to young people aged 5–18 years of all genders
- circus workshop programs within communities, run in partnership with community organisations
- circus productions, performed for audiences

The company's inaugural production was A Girl's Own Adventure, performed in December 1995 at the Princess Theatre in Annerley, Brisbane. The second production in 1996 was Volt, a low-budget production for the Brisbane Festival. In 1997, Casella and Gough directed Life Blood at the Princess Theatre. Anna Yen and Casella co-directed Fire in the Belly for La Boite Theatre's 'Shock of the New' festival in 1998. In 1999, Anna Yen and Casella co-directed " Blissed Out, Distraught and Intoxicated..." which was performed at the Princess, then toured to Adelaide for the 2000 Fringe Festival.

In 2000, the company moved from its original location in West End to the Brisbane Powerhouse in New Farm. The Vulcana show I'd Rather be a Cyborg than a Goddess, directed by Therese Collie, was part of the Powerhouse's opening season. This show toured to the National Circus festival in Mullumbimby, and also did a week at the Lismore Town Hall. In 2001, Yen directed 'Aviatrix' which was performed at the Powerhouse and Chelsea McGuffin was artistic director of Vulcana. "Cravings", directed by Casella, was presented in the Visy Theatre at the Powerhouse in 2002.

Antonella Casella rejoined Circus Oz, and in 2003 the new artistic director of the company was Celia White.

Under White's direction in 2005, Vulcana, in partnership with Inala Wangarra, Kooemba Jdarra, and Contact Inc, produced Bungo the Money God. The show was based on a dramatization of a story by Uncle Herb Wharton, and was performed at the Brisbane Powerhouse by members of the Inala community, from children to elders, including established performance troupes from the community.

White also helmed the productions Home Fictions in 2004 (community show in partnership with the Older Women's Network); Circus in a Tea Cup (2006) in partnership with Brisbane Domestic Violence Service and Qld Injecting Health Network; Strange Creatures (2006) with the Deaf community in Brisbane and the Vulcana workshop community; Uncharted (2007) with African migrants in partnership with MultiLink Settlement Services, SpeakOut and BEMAC; Sling Backs, High Heels and Sensible Shoes (2008) in partnership with Brisbane Domestic Violence Advocacy Service and Women's Health Qld Wide (among others.)

After White's departure in mid-2009, Penny Lowther joined Vulcana as the interim artistic director. Lowther was the founder of women's community circus Circus WOW in Wollongong, New South Wales and came from a background of visual art and street performance. Productions during this time included Aperture - performed at the Island Vibe Festival on North Stradbroke Island.

Veronica Neave held the position of artistic director from 2010 until 2014, when White returned to the helm.

In 2019, Vulcana Circus relocated to their new circus and arts hub in Morningside.
