= Monte Saldo =

British bodybuilder

Monte Saldo in 1906

Monte Saldo (1879 – 23 February 1949; born as Alfred Montague Woollaston) was an early bodybuilder who later, with his brothers Frank Saldo and Edwin Woollaston, formed the stage act The Montague Brothers, in which they displayed acts of strength including supporting a heavy motor car complete with passengers. With Maxick, he developed the Maxalding system of muscle control.

== Early years ==
Born in Highgate in London, the son of George Frederick Woollaston (1828–1896), a shoe manufacturer who was medically documented for having 19 inch forearms, Methodist preacher and faith healer, and Adelaide Mary (née Green) (1849–1923), a woman who stood well over 6 feet tall. Saldo was interested in strength athletics as a youth, and in his teens joined the London Weightlifting Club in Regent Street in London. From May 1895 he worked as a booking clerk for the London, Brighton and South Coast Railway at their office in Brighton's Grand Hotel.

An uncle with connections in the theatrical profession arranged for the 18-year-old Saldo to be apprenticed to Eugen Sandow in 1897. His first public appearance was at the Coliseum in Leeds as a demonstrator of the Sandow Exerciser. A fellow-apprentice at Sandow's gym was Italian bodybuilder Ronco, and having gained stage experience while helping Sandow in his act Saldo and Ronco decided to go it alone, creating their own strongman stage act. Billed as "Ronco & Monte", the duo first appeared in 1900 at the Cafe Chantant at The Crystal Palace. This was followed soon after by a tour of Europe; on their return to Britain they appeared for six months at the Royal Aquarium in London.

== Strongman Act ==
Saldo supporting a Darracq

In common with many strongman acts of the period, part of their routine was to offer money to any member of the public who could copy their feats of strength; no one was ever successful in duplicating them. Saldo and Ronco's appearance at the Royal Aquarium was so successful that their contract was extended, but when this came to an end they separated. Saldo then teamed up with his younger brother Frank Harold Woollaston, and the new strongman act opened at the Hippodrome in London, followed by a European tour during which Saldo posed for the Dutch artist Jozef Israëls, who, impressed by his physique, painted him in a classical pose. During the tour the brothers appeared in Amsterdam, Dresden, Hamburg, Saxony, Prague and Paris, at the latter city regularly working out in the gymnasium of Edmond Desbonnet. On their return they appeared for a season at the London Pavilion.

In 1903 Saldo added a new routine to the act which was designed to draw in large audiences, during which he supported a heavy motor car in the "Tomb of Hercules" position. Having prepared and rehearsed carefully, on stage a Darracq full of passengers was driven up a ramp and onto a bridge, where the ramp and supports were removed leaving Saldo supporting the entire weight of the vehicle and its contents on a section of the bridge. Later, the act was refined, with Saldo supporting the car on top of a ten-foot high revolving platform. This act was taken on another international tour, for which Saldo received the largest salary ever paid to a one-man strongman act.

Monte Saldo weighed 144 pounds, stood 5′5″, had a 17″ neck, 45.5″ chest, 16″ arms, 13″ forearms, 30″ waist, 23″ thighs and 15,5″ calves. He could bent press 230 pounds and was the first man in England to do a one arm swing with more than body weight, doing 150 pounds. He is credited with showing for the first time that the swing was best done with a dumbbell loaded unevenly, with more weight on the back end of the bell.

== The Sculptor's Dream ==
In 1906 Saldo refined the act even further, teaming up with his brothers Frank (now known as Frank Saldo) and Edwin, the three of them billing themselves as "The Montague Brothers", and performing a new routine called "The Sculptor's Dream".

A theatrical poster for 'The Sculptor's Dream' (1906)

The act was described by Alexander Zass thus:

"... a real strongman, and a clever weightlifter to boot was Monte Saldo, whose stage showmanship was best displayed, perhaps, in a turn which he presented with his brother Frank, entitled "the Sculptor's Dream," certainly of the most artistic and impressive of any ever given.
The curtain rose disclosing a sculptor's studio, with the sculptor at work on a reproduction of a well known classical statue. The figure was Monte himself, painted and garbed in an excellent imitation of marble, and behind him was a mirror, in which the statue could be seen reproduced. After working a while, the sculpture wearied, and concealing his masterpiece behind curtains, stretched himself at length upon a couch, soon to be ostensibly asleep. The curtains thereupon parted on their own account, revealing the statue in another classical pose, again reflected in the mirror. Then once more they closed, only to re-open and repeat their re-opening to revelation of ever fresh poses and reflections, until finally the statue and the mirror reflection confront each other in a famous wrestler's attitude.
A pause, and then the mirror crashing as the 'reflection' – brother Frank, to be more explicit – leapt out to grapple with Monte, and execute on stage a variety of wrestling postures. This unique opening was followed by a series of equally novel strength feats in which both iron and human weights figured, closured by Monte pressing Frank aloft with one hand, and a twirl round of the supported performer. This twirl, by the way, was very smartly done. As Frank leant back to be supported on Monte's palm, the lifter would interpose a revolving disc on which his brother's back rested. Thus when Frank had been pressed aloft, it enabled Monte to spin him.
At this juncture, the sculptor would commence to stir, whereupon both statue and 'reflection' would leap back and, resuming their original poses, thus satisfying the now awakened chiseller of marble that all which had transpired was actually nothing but a dream.
Monte Saldo was one of the few men who have enhanced a reputation made on the stage as a strongman by feats performed away from its atmosphere of glamour and make-believe. The first man in the world to 'swing' over his own bodyweight with one hand, and one of the most successful trainers of strong men ever known..."

The Entr'acte said of this new routine, "An absolutely original athletic act is given by the Montague Brothers. Their performance is entitled 'The Sculptor's Dream' and provides the most original setting we have ever seen, being athletic and at the same time effective when it comes to feats of strength pure and simple. Their work is simply amazing." The sculptor was played by Edwin John Woollaston (1874–1918), the duo's older brother.

== Later years ==
Later, with William Bankier, who at this time was a wrestling promoter known professionally as Apollo the Scottish Hercules, Saldo opened the Apollo-Saldo Academy in London, which attracted many of the famous lifters and wrestlers of the day, including George Hackenschmidt, Ferdy Gruhen, Maurice Deriaz, Zbysco, and the winner of over 1,000 contests and Lightweight Wrestling Champion of the World, gold and silver medalist in the 1908 Olympics, London born George de Relwyskow. In 1909, as a result of the success of the Academy, Saldo became a founder of the Maxaldo method of exercise system of muscle control along with German strongman Max Sick (Maxick) (a name created from those of the founders, Maxick and Saldo). The name was later changed to Maxalding, and the postal course was sold into the 1970s.

In 1914 Saldo published a book, How to Pose, which had a great influence on athletic, aesthetic and muscular posing. He was also active in organising the British Amateur Weightlifter's Association, (BAWLA) and was a Committee member for professional weightlifters.

Largely self-taught, Saldo was an accomplished musician and was fluent in several languages. His wife Florence Annie Woollaston (née Bryant) (1878–1941) was killed during a bombing raid on London during World War II, and Saldo and his daughter Florence were seriously injured. His youngest son Charles was killed during the invasion of Europe in 1944.

Monte Saldo lived in Hythe in Kent during his later years, and died on 23 February 1949 at The County Hospital in Ashford in Kent aged 70. In his will he left £249 13s 4d. He was survived by his daughter Florence Theresa Montague Wilson (née Woollaston) (1907–1990) and a son, Frederick Harold Courtlandt Woollaston (1910–1983), also known as Court Saldo.
