= Ludwig Durlacher =

American strongman, gymnasium owner, and personal trainer

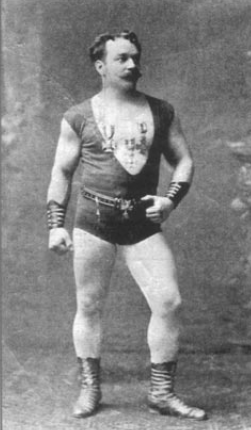
- Born: 2 July 1844; Karlsruhe, Grand Duchy of Baden
- Died: 15 March 1924 (aged 79)
- Occupations: Strongman, gym owner, personal trainer
- Spouse: Roseanna Attila
- Children: 2 daughters
- Relatives: Siegmund Klein (son-in-law)

Ludwig Durlacher, also known as Louis Attila, (July 2, 1844 – March 15, 1924) was a Grand Duchy of Baden-born American strongman, gym owner and personal trainer. He trained members of European royal families and American high society as well as athletes like Eugen Sandow and James J. Corbett. He was "one of the first 'personal trainers' for the rich and famous".

== Early life ==
Durlacher was born on July 2, 1844, in Karlsruhe, Grand Duchy of Baden. He was trained by Italian strongman Felice Napoli from a young age, and he later joined the Baden Sharpshooters, a sports club.

== Career ==
Durlacher began his career as a strongman in 1863, under the stage name of Attila. He toured all over Europe, including at the Folies Bergère in Paris and the Alhambra Theatre in London. He performed at the Golden Jubilee of Queen Victoria in 1887.

Durlacher became "one of the first 'personal trainers' for the rich and famous". His clients included many members of high society like Cornelius Vanderbilt and members of royal families of Denmark, Norway, Britain, Greece and Russia. After opening his own gym in Brussels in 1886, he began training Eugen Sandow, an early bodybuilder. He opened another gym in Bloomsbury, London in 1889, and he continued to train Sandow.

Durlacher emigrated to the United States in 1893. He opened a gym in New York City known as Attila's Athletic Studio and School of Physical Culture. From 1898 to 1924, it was located at 1383 Broadway in Midtown Manhattan. Members included John Philip Sousa, Alfred Vanderbilt, and J. P. Morgan Jr., and visitors included Louis Cyr and Warren Lincoln Travis. Durlacher also trained boxing champion James J. Corbett. He was one of the first trainers to encourage women to lift weights and box.

== Personal life and death ==
Durlacher had two daughters, Grace, who married Siegmund Klein, a bodybuilder and Louisa Eugenie, a who had a long career as a costumer on Broadway and who married Albert Barlow, a 'song & dance' man

Durlacher died on March 15, 1924. His widow, Roseanna Attila, died in 1961.
