= Howard Spicer =

English papermaker (1872–1926)

Sir Howard Spicer KBE
- Portrait by Walter Stoneman, 1918
- Born: Howard Handley Spicer; 1872; Bexley, Kent, England
- Died: August 16, 1926 (aged 53–54); London, England
- Occupations: Papermaker; Magazine editor

Sir Howard Handley Spicer KBE, (1872 in Bexley, Kent – 16 August 1926 in London) was a prominent papermaker and wholesale stationer and a magazine editor. He was the founder of the Empire League, a patriotic movement for British boys, and editor of the League's magazine, Boys of the Empire.

== Life and works ==
Howard Spicer was the eldest son of James Spicer (1846-1915), a wealthy paper merchant, and Jane Anne Powell. His uncles were Albert Spicer (1847–1934) and Evan Spicer. Howard Spicer entered his father's firm in 1890. The family residence was North Park Perry House, Eltham, Kent. In 1911, Spicer and his wife were living at Brooklands House, Chobham, Woking and his occupation was stated as paper merchant and manufacturer.

Spicer edited Boys of the Empire, which was published in London by his friend Andrew Melrose from 1901 to 1903. It called itself “A Magazine for British Boys All Over the World” but its published aim was “To promote and strengthen a worthy imperial spirit in British-born boys." It was "arguably the most jingoistic of all the juvenile periodicals". The League attracted over 10,000 members, under the Presidency of Arthur Conan Doyle, and provided "lectures, sermons and cultural visits, all on an imperial theme."

A sports enthusiast, Spicer edited books on sport for both boys and girls, published by Andrew Melrose, and was also editor of "The Sports Library", a series of books promoting a wide range of sports. While he was the editor of Sandow's Magazine of Physical Culture, he introduced the Scottish writer George Douglas Brown to Melrose.

During World War I, he was a technical advisor to the War Office and was later knighted for his services. He assisted in the design and manufacture of an improved gas mask. He was an authority on dogs, in particular the bloodhound and griffon.

In 1920, Spicer's wife Dame Muriel Eleanor Barrett Handley Spicer filed a Divorce Court petition for restitution of conjugal rights. Spicer was vice-chairman and joint managing director of the paper firm James Spicer & Sons (since 1922 Spicers Ltd.), and a director of United Newspapers and the Edinburgh Evening News, at the time of his death in 1926. He was found dead in a hotel near the Strand, having shot himself. The inquest recorded a finding of suicide while of unsound mind. His portrait by Walter Stoneman is in the National Portrait Gallery.
