= Dynamic Tension =

System of physical exercises popularised by Charles Atlas

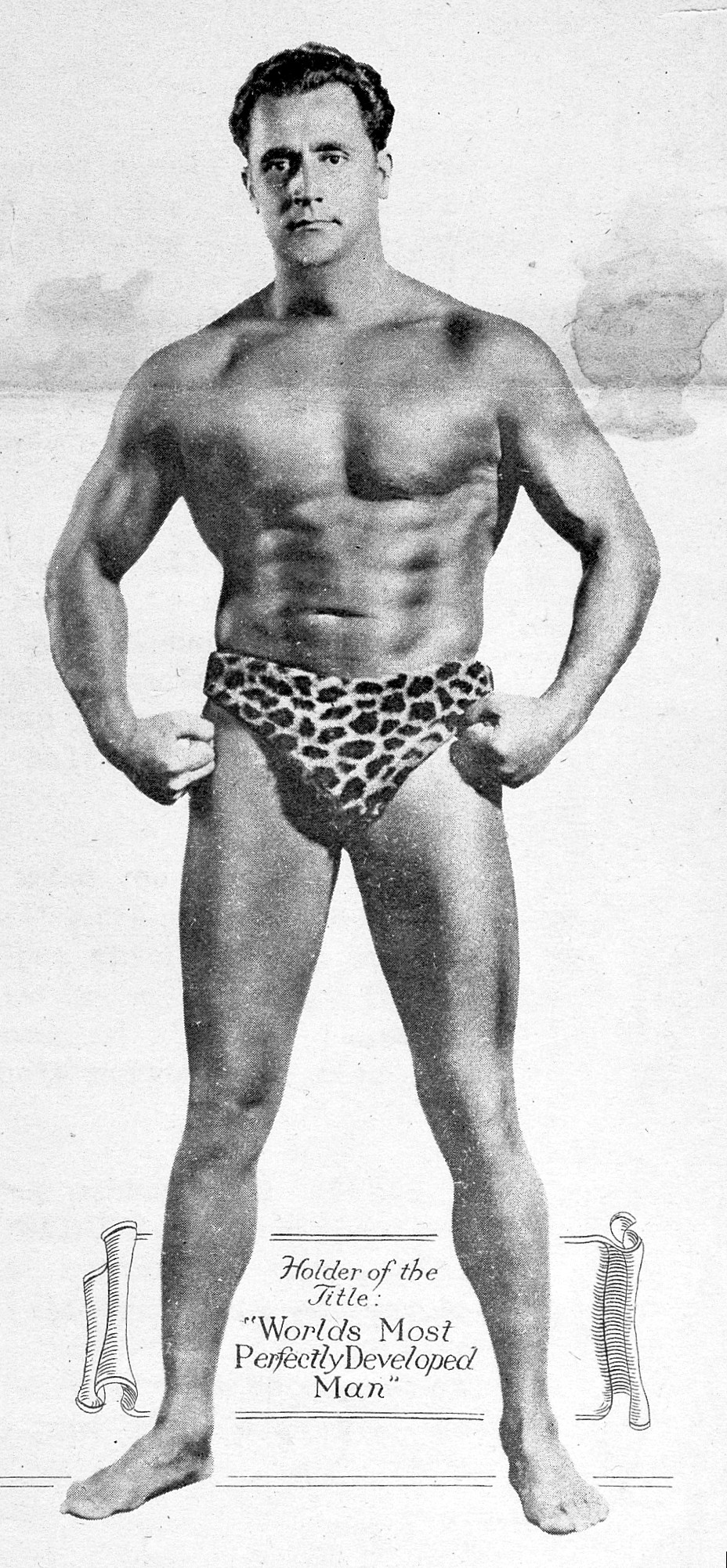
Charles Atlas in a 1930s print ad

"Dynamic Tension" is the name Charles Atlas gave to the system of physical exercises that he first popularized in the 1920s.

Dynamic Tension is a self-resistance exercise method which pits muscle against muscle. The practitioner tenses the muscles of a given body part and then moves the body part against the tension as if a heavy weight were being lifted. Dynamic Tension exercises are not merely isometrics, since they call for movement. Instead, the method comprises a combination of exercises in three disciplines: isotonic, isokinetic, and some exercises in the isometric discipline.

Charles Atlas Ltd., which Atlas incorporated in 1929, owns the trademark for Dynamic Tension.

== History ==
After being bullied as a child, Charles Atlas joined the YMCA and began to do numerous exercise routines. He became obsessed with strength. He said that one day he watched a tiger stretching in the zoo and asked himself, "How does Mr. Tiger keep in physical condition? Did you ever see a tiger with a barbell?" He concluded that lions and tigers became strong by pitting muscle against muscle.

The story may be apocryphal, but it captures the essence of Atlas's innovation. There were many other "isometric" courses available at the time, and sales took off only after Atlas used an advertisement depicting a bully kicking sand in a weakling's face. Some other notable users of this method include Joe DiMaggio, Max Baer, Rocky Marciano, Joe Louis, Robert Ripley and Alan Wells.

== See also ==
- Isometric exercise device
