= Isometric exercise device =

Device to exercise body parts

An isometric exercise device is a device used to exercise most body parts including the wrist and is often used as part of physical therapy or in order to build muscle strength in a low impact manner. Devices can range in size from large bulky machines used by physicians to small hand-held devices that can be used by an individual. Isometric devices have been used for centuries. The first devices did not display the users' output; nowadays there are devices that can digitally output the users force. Before that some devices used an analog format.

== Function ==
Isometric exercise devices perform exercises or strength test using static contraction of a muscle without any visible movement in the angle of the joint. This is reflected in the name; the term "isometric" combines the prefix "iso" (same) with "metric" (distance), meaning that in these exercises the length of the muscle does not change, as compared to isotonic contractions ("tonos" means "tension" in Greek) in which the contraction strength does not change but the joint angle does. New isometric exercise devices often used force gauges and a micro processor and then output the force onto an LCD screen or store the information later to be downloaded onto a computer.

== Medical uses ==
Isometric exercises can also be used at the bedside to differentiate various heart murmurs; the murmur of mitral regurgitation gets louder as compared to the quieter murmur of aortic stenosis.

== Comparison with dynamic exercises ==
Isometric exercises have some differences in training effect as compared to dynamic exercises. While isometric training increases strength at the specific joint angles of the exercises performed and additional joint angles to a lesser extent, dynamic exercises increase strength throughout the full range of motion. Generally speaking however, people who train isometrically don't train through a full range of motion as the strength gained at the training joint angle is where they require it. While dynamic exercises are slightly better than isometric exercises at enhancing the twitch force of a muscle, isometrics are significantly better than dynamic exercises at increasing maximal strength at the joint angle. Flexibility may be increased when isometrics are performed at joint range of motion extremes. These isometric contractions recruit muscle fibers that are often neglected in some dynamic exercises. For example, gymnasts are extremely strong at great ranges of motion through the practice of isometric holds.

== See also ==
- Dynamic tension
