= Isotonic contraction =

Muscle contraction that maintains constant tension as the muscle changes length

In an isotonic contraction, tension remains the same, whilst the muscle's length changes. By contrast, in isokinetic contractions, the muscle speed remains constant, whilst the tension changes. As the muscle's force changes via the length-tension relationship during a contraction, an isotonic contraction keeps force constant while velocity changes, whereas an isokinetic contraction keeps velocity constant while force changes. A near isotonic contraction is known as Auxotonic contraction.

There are two types of isotonic contractions: (1) concentric and (2) eccentric. In a concentric contraction, the muscle tension rises to meet the resistance, then remains the same as the muscle shortens. In eccentric, the muscle lengthens due to the resistance being greater than the force the muscle is producing.

== Concentric ==
This type is typical of most exercise. The external force on the muscle is less than the force the muscle is generating - a shortening contraction. The effect is not visible during the classic biceps curl, which is in fact auxotonic because the resistance (torque due to the weight being lifted) does not remain the same through the exercise. Tension is highest at a parallel to the floor level, and eases off above and below this point. Therefore, tension changes as well as muscle length.

== Eccentric ==
There are two main features to note regarding eccentric contractions. First, the absolute tensions achieved can be very high relative to the muscle's maximum tetanic tension generating capacity (you can set down a much heavier object than you can lift). Second, the absolute tension is relatively independent of lengthening velocity.

Muscle injury and soreness are selectively associated with eccentric contraction. Muscle strengthening using exercises that involve eccentric contractions is lower than using concentric exercises. However because higher levels of tension are easier to attain during exercises that involve eccentric contractions it may be that, by generating higher signals for muscle strengthening, muscle hypertrophy is better than exercises that involve concentric contractions, albeit at a higher level of resistance.

== Auxotonic contraction ==
This is almost an isotonic contraction because there is some fluctuation towards the end of the contraction. For example, the heart's ventricles contract to expel blood into the pulmonary artery and aorta. As the blood flows out, the previous built-up load is decreased and hence less force is required to expel the rest of the blood. Thus the tension is reduced.

== See also ==
- Isometric exercise (contraction, no movement)
- Stretching (passive, no contraction)
