= Tony Holland (bodybuilder) =

British bodybuilder (born 1939)

Tony Holland (born 1939) is a British bodybuilder known for his muscle dancing act using his skill at the Maxalding muscle control technique.

He appeared on the ITV talent show Opportunity Knocks in 1964. His act consisted of flexing his biceps and then his shoulder muscles to the music Wheels Cha-Cha. He won the show six times and went on to repeat his 'muscle dancing' act on Sunday Night at the London Palladium.
