= William Bankier =

Scottish strongman stage performer

William Bankier

William Bankier (10 December 1870 – 4 September 1949) billed as 'Apollo, the Scottish Hercules', was a strongman stage performer who in 1915 and 1919 was also 'King Rat' of the showbusiness charity the Grand Order of Water Rats.

== Early years ==
Born in Banff in Scotland, the eldest of four sons of William Bankier (1845–1900), a hand loom weaver, and his wife Mary Ann (née Clark) (1844– 1901), as a child he became fascinated by the idea of being a circus performer, and aged 12 he ran away from home and joined a circus as a labourer. Soon after his father discovered his whereabouts and collected him, but a few months later Bankier ran away to sea, joining a ship's crew. After being shipwrecked he found himself in Montreal in Canada where he worked as a farm labourer. Aged 14 he joined Porgie O'Brien's Road Show where one of the acts was a strongman; Bankier studied his act and learned his routine.

== Strongman career ==
Bankier harness-lifting an elephant

When the road show's original strongman could not perform his act owing to drunkenness, Bankier, aged 15, appeared in his place putting on a satisfactory performance. As the strongman drank more and missed more performances, Bankier continued to take his place, gradually growing in skill as a performer and strongman. After about a year, Bankier left the road show to join William Muldoon's athletic combination which toured the United States promoting athletic events; Muldoon billed him as 'Carl Clyndon, the Canadian Strong Boy', and Bankier added wrestling to his act.

Leaving Muldoon he next joined Jack Kilrain, a former heavyweight boxing champion and from whom he learned to box. Aged 17 Bankier joined Buffalo Bill's Wild West, a circus-like attraction that toured annually. From there he joined the Ginnett Circus for three months, performing as 'Carl Clyndon'.

Next he joined the Bostock Circus, known at that time for having the best performers and acts, and here he honed his strongman skills, part of his new act involving harness-lifting a full grown elephant weighing 32cwt and balancing on the backs of two chairs while raising a man with his right hand above his head while juggling plates with his left.

=== Apollo ===
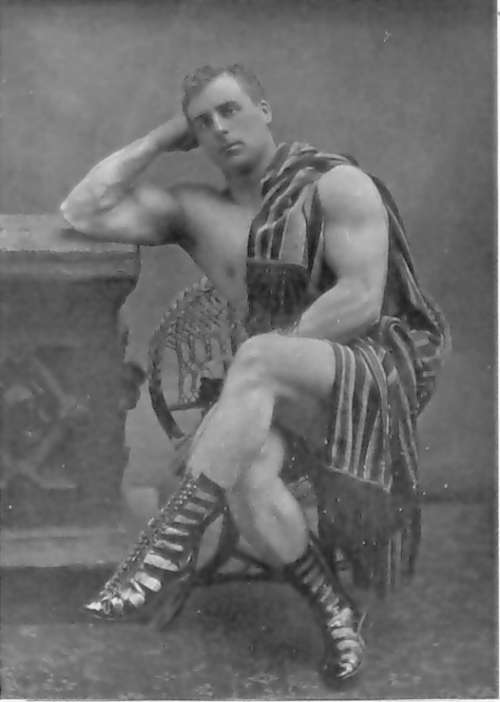
Bankier as 'Apollo, the Scottish Hercules'

By the 1890s Bankier was back in Great Britain and it was at this time he was persuaded by Sir John Everett Millais to change his stage name from Carl Clyndon, and as Apollo, the Scottish Hercules he travelled around the world performing to large audiences.

==== Tomb of Hercules and Bankier Sack ====
During his act he would perform the Tomb of Hercules, during which he would support a piano with a six-person orchestra and a dancer. He would end his routine by offering £10 to anyone who could carry off the stage a large burlap sack he claimed weighed 215.5 kg (475 lb). When anyone in the audience had tried and failed Bankier would carry it off himself.

However, during 2019 Strongest Man in History TV show they estimated the weight would have probably been around 181.5 kg (400 lb) or less, and the current world record at that weight is shared by Martins Licis and Rauno Heinla who both carried the sack a distance of 46.02 metres (151 ft 0 in) during 2019 Arnold USA Santa Monica competition.

==== Feud with Eugen Sandow ====
In 1900 Bankier wrote Ideal Physical Culture in which he challenged popular strongman of the period Eugen Sandow to a contest in weightlifting, wrestling, running and jumping. When Sandow did not accept his challenge Bankier called him a coward, a charlatan and a liar. In 1903, Bankier started his own magazine, and in its May 1904 edition appeared a further attack on Sandow, purportedly written by Sandow's one-time opponent 'Cyclops', but clearly actually written by Bankier. It read, "Picture to yourself a good-looking man tripping on the stage with the short pitter-patter of a fussy little woman with sore feet trying to avoid treading on a companion's dress, and forcing herself to look amiable. That is exactly how Sandow walks upon the stage."

== Later years ==
After retiring from the stage, with Monte Saldo (formerly of The Montague Brothers) he opened the Apollo-Saldo Academy in London, which attracted many of the famous lifters and wrestlers of the day, including George Hackenschmidt, Ferdy Gruhen, Maurice Deriaz, Zbysco, and the winner of over 1,000 contests and Lightweight Wrestling Champion of the World, gold and silver medalist in the 1908 Olympics, London born George de Relwyskow. He also went into wrestling promotion, and among his clients was Yukio Tani, a Japanese jujutsu instructor and professional challenge wrestler. With Tani he founded the British Society of Jiu-Jitsu. Another notable client was Masutaro Otani, a Japanese judo master. In 1915 and 1919 Bankier was 'King Rat' of the British showbusiness charity the Grand Order of Water Rats.

William Bankier remained active in wrestling promotion until his death aged 79 in September 1949 at the Red Rocks Nursing Home in Cheshire. He left £15663 18s 2d in his will.

== In popular culture ==
In 2019, the History Channel's The Strongest Man in History dedicated an episode entitled "Strongmen Go West"; traveling to Cody, Wyoming and recreating several original feats made famous by Bankier.

== Publications ==
- Ideal Physical Culture (1900)
