= Sandow's Magazine of Physical Culture =

First bodybuilding magazine

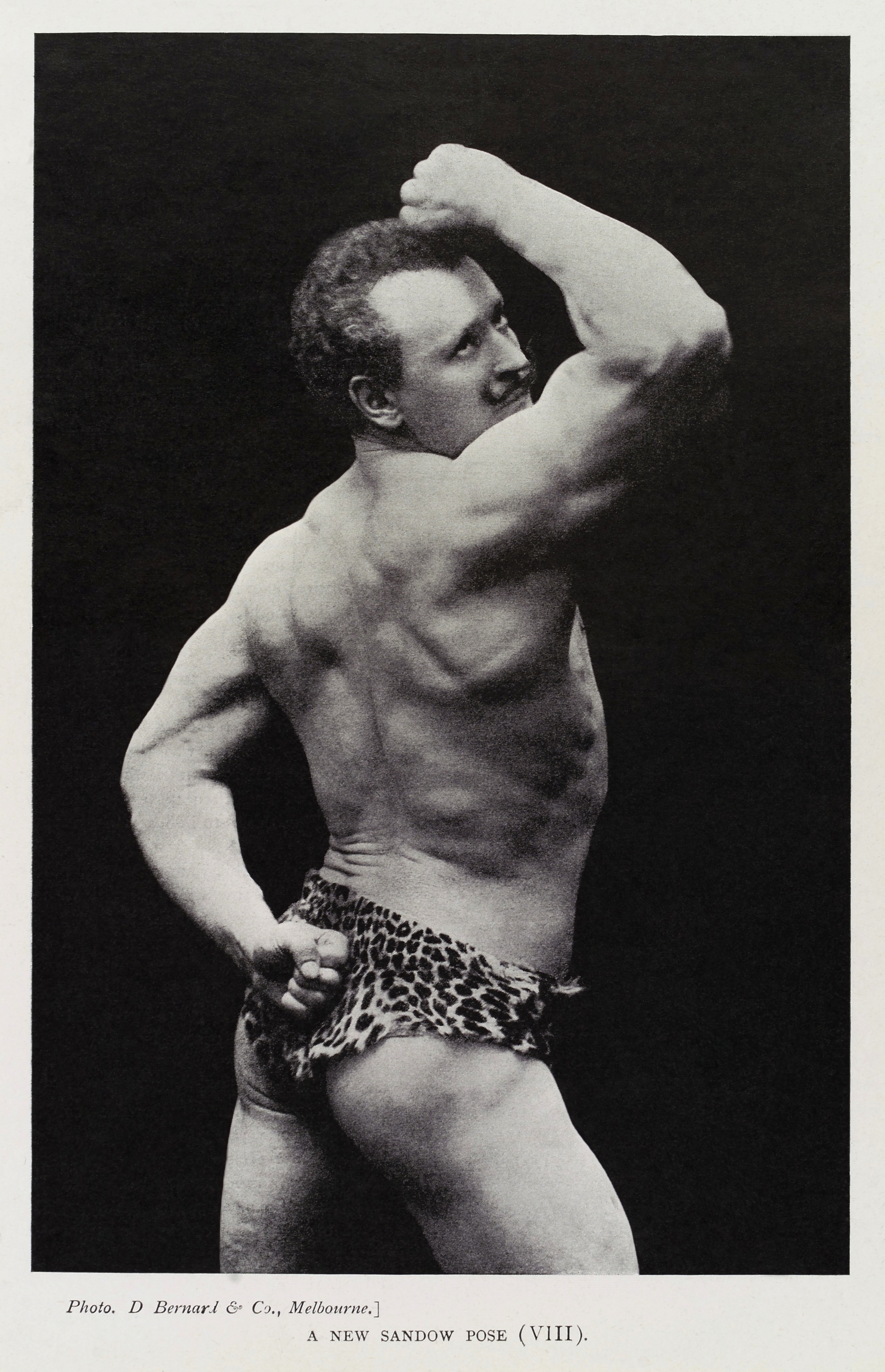
"A New Sandow Pose (VIII)" was one of the magazine's illustrations.

Sandow's Magazine of Physical Culture (1898–1907), established by Eugen Sandow in London, in 1898, may be regarded as the first bodybuilding magazine.

Founded in July 1898 under the name Physical Culture, the magazine was renamed Sandow's Magazine of Physical Culture in April 1899. It was also known as Sandow's magazine of physical culture and British sport. It closed, due to a decline in interest, in June 1907.

Howard Spicer was editor. Contributors included the music-hall artist Dan Leno, and several young writers who would subsequently achieve fame: P. G. Wodehouse, H. H. Munro and George Douglas Brown.
