= Isometric exercise =

Static contraction exercises

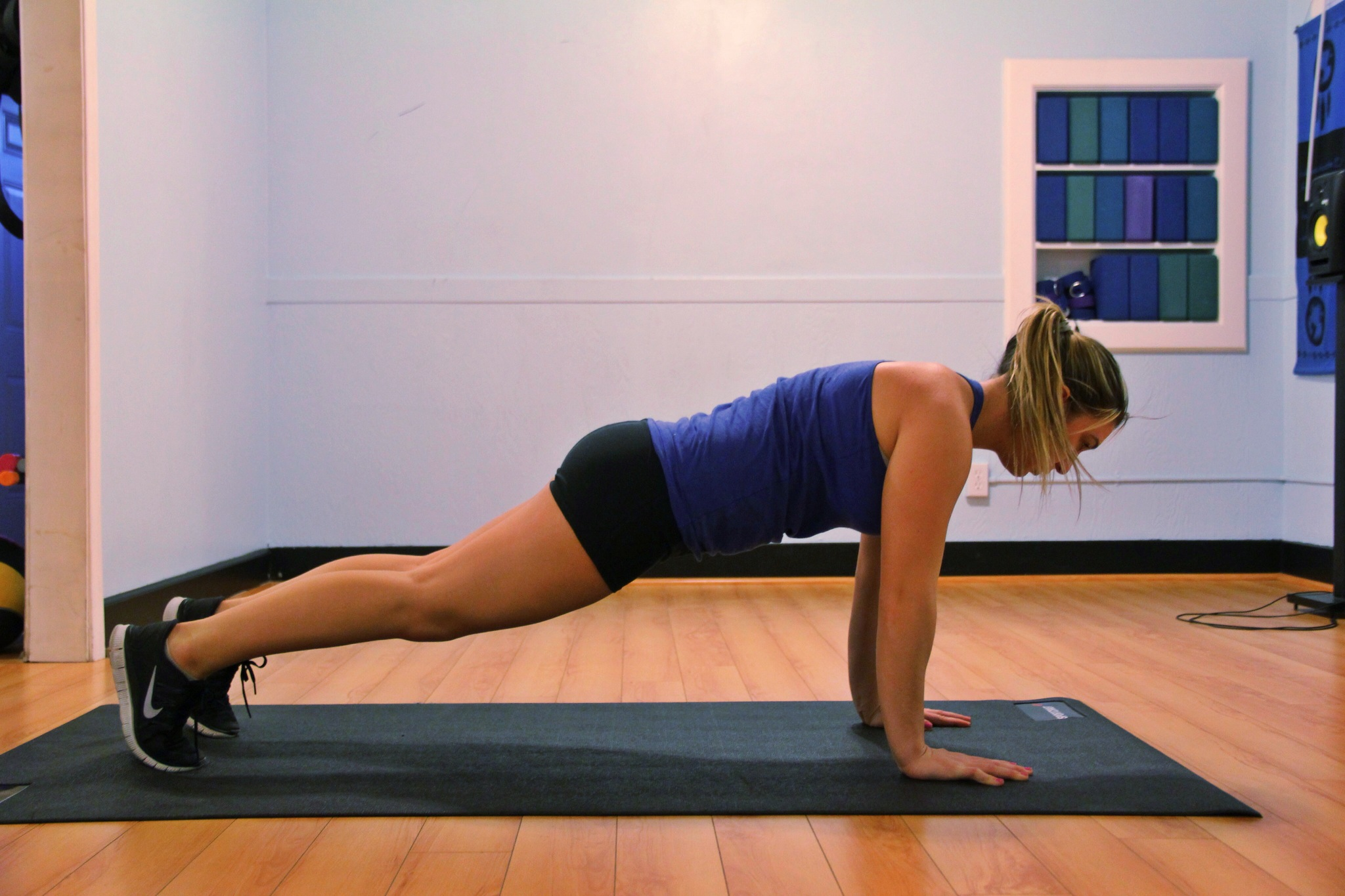
The 'plank' is a type of isometric hold which can intensively activate the body's core musculature.

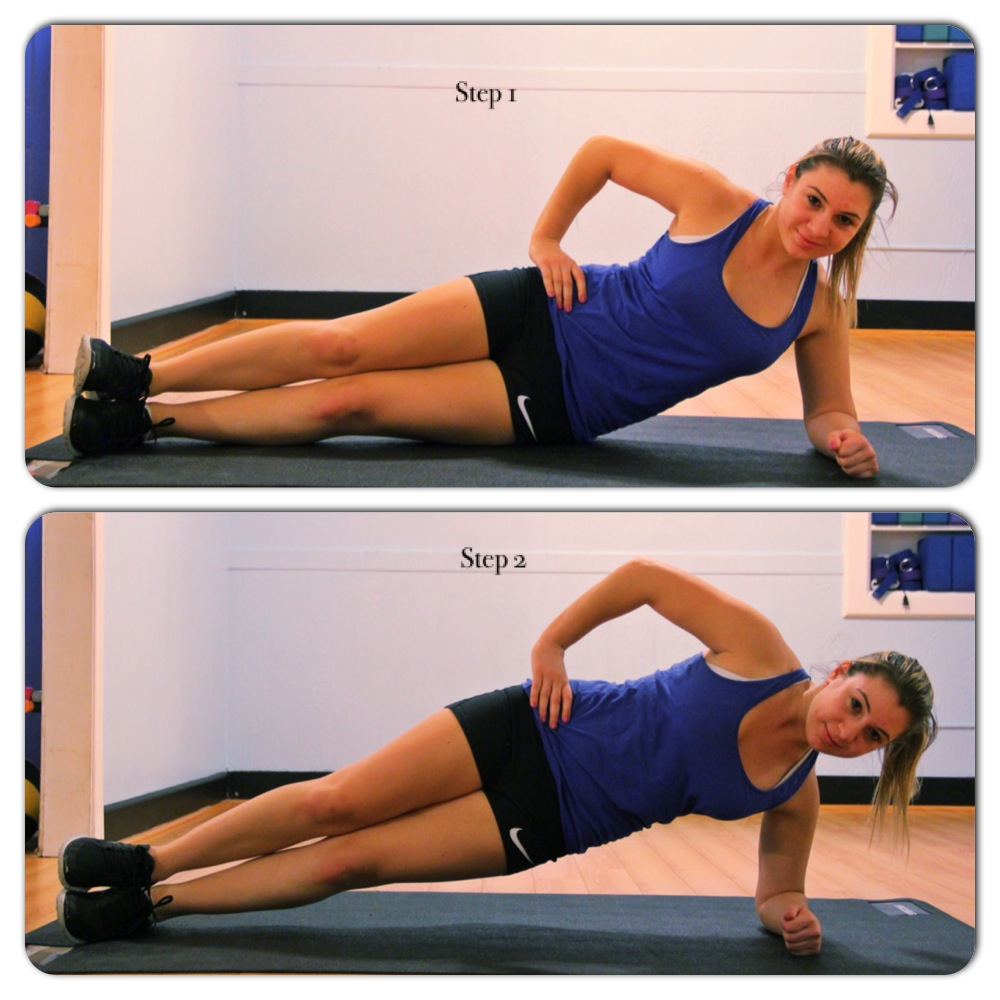
The 'side plank' is a variation designed to strengthen the oblique muscles.

An isometric exercise (also known as static exercise) is an exercise involving the static contraction of a muscle without any visible movement in the angle of the joint. The term "isometric" combines the Greek words isos (equal) and -metria (measuring), meaning that in these exercises the length of the muscle and the angle of the joint do not change, though contraction strength may be varied. This is in contrast to isotonic contractions, in which the contraction strength does not change, though the muscle length and joint angle do.

The three main types of isometric exercise are isometric presses, pulls, and holds. They may be included in a strength training program in order to improve the body's ability to apply power from a static position or, in the case of isometric holds, improve the body's ability to maintain a position for a period of time. Considered as an action, isometric presses are also of fundamental importance to the body's ability to prepare itself to perform immediately subsequent power movements. Such preparation is also known as isometric preload.

== Overcoming and yielding isometrics ==
An isometric action is one where the observable angle of the joints is maintained. While this definition always applies there are various sub-definitions which exist in order to emphasise how effort is being applied during specific isometric exercises. In a yielding isometric exercise the ambition is to maintain a particular body position; this may also be called maintaining an isometric hold. In an overcoming isometric exercise the ambition is to push or pull against either another part of the self, which pushes or pulls back with equal force, or to move an immovable object. On this basis, an overcoming isometric may additionally be referred to as being an isometric press or an isometric pull.

=== Unweighted isometrics ===
In unweighted isometrics the exerciser uses only themselves for resistance. For example, holding a crouched position, or pressing the palms of the hands against each other. Where by the self presses against itself, this is also referred to as self-resistance or Dynamic Tension training.

=== Weighted isometrics ===
Weighted isometrics involve the additional holding of a weight, and the pressing or pulling of an immovable weight or structure. For example, in a bench press set-up the barbell can be held in a fixed position and neither pushed upwards nor allowed to descend. Alternatively, in a mid-thigh pull set-up, a person can attempt to pull a fixed, immovable bar upwards.

Example of an unweighted overcoming isometric exercise

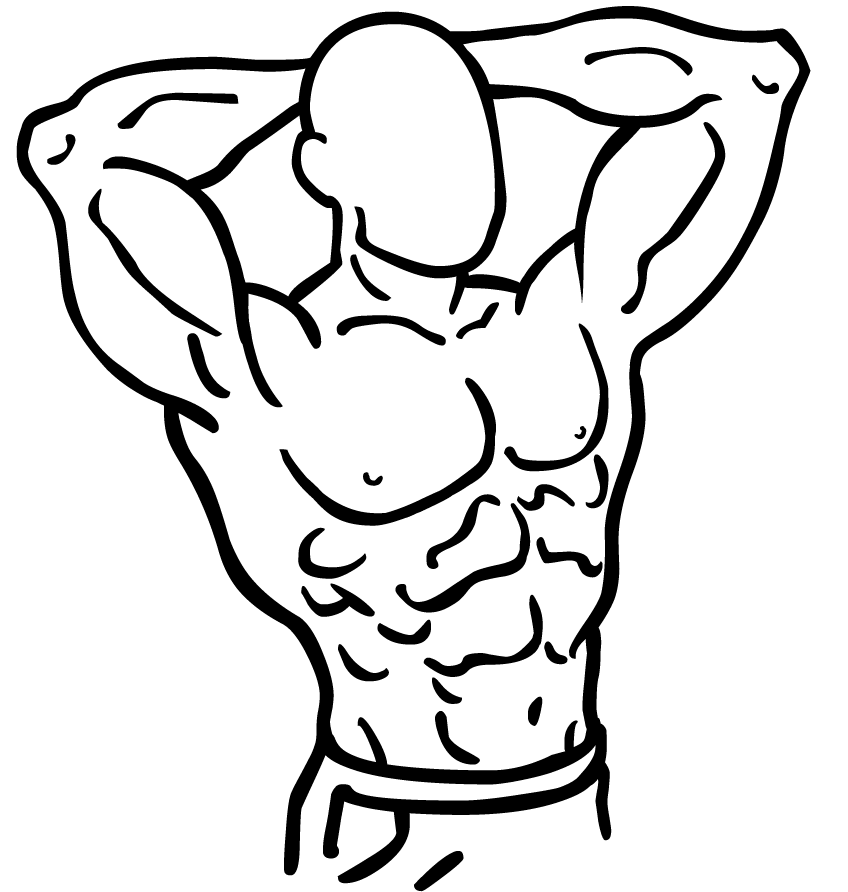
The movement of the head is resisted by the hands.

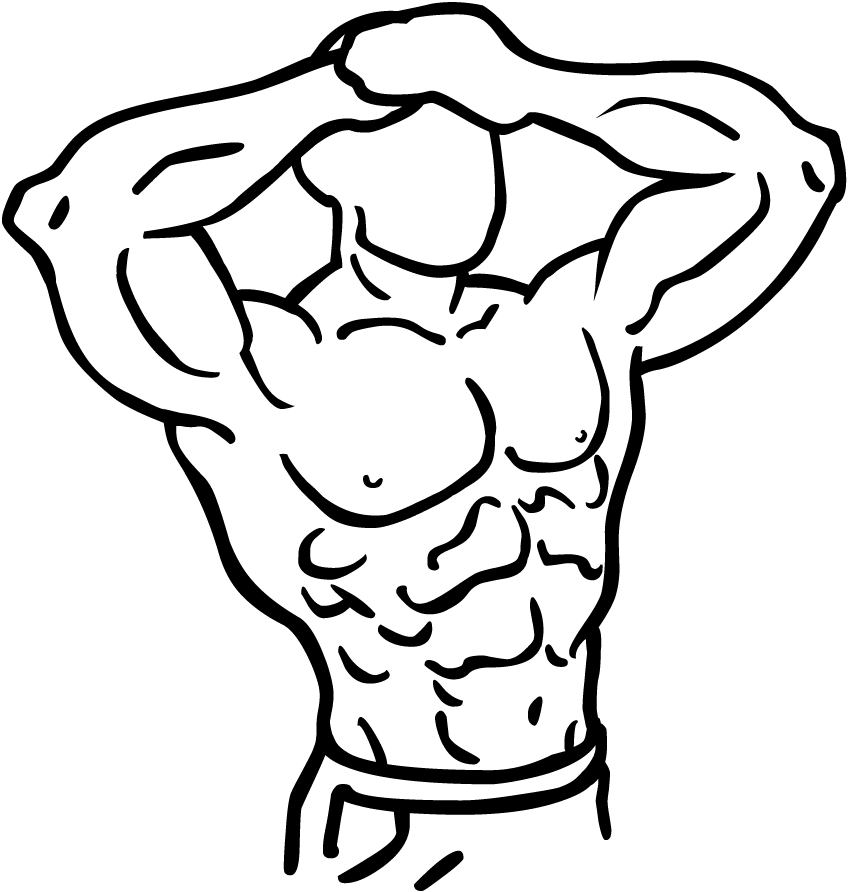

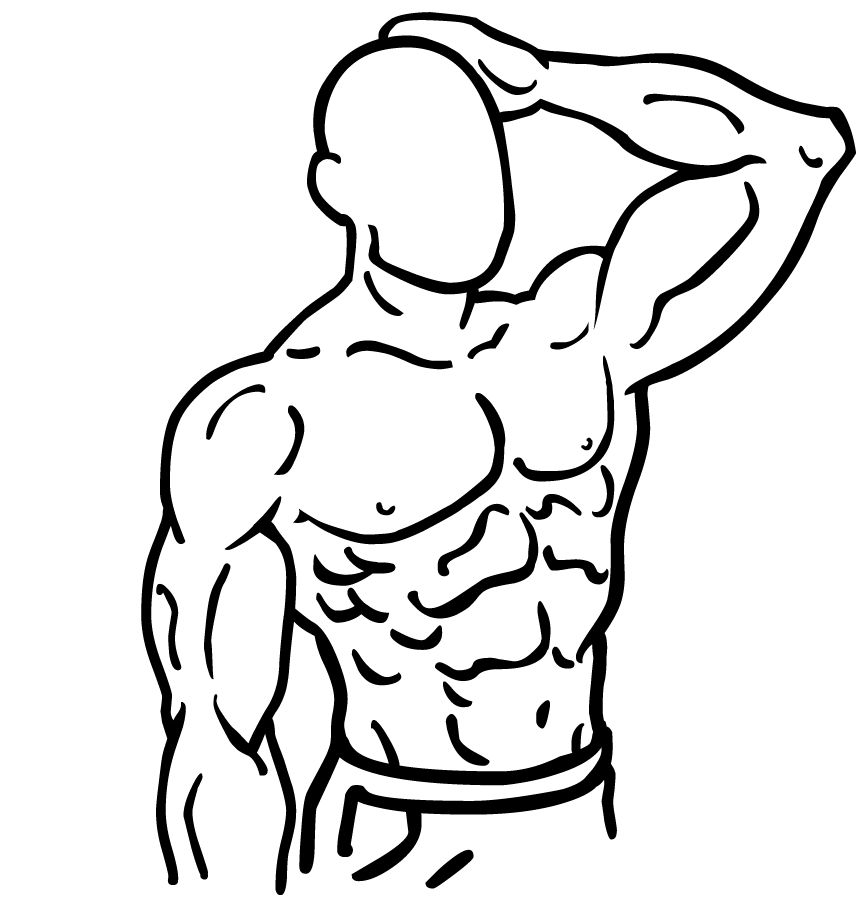

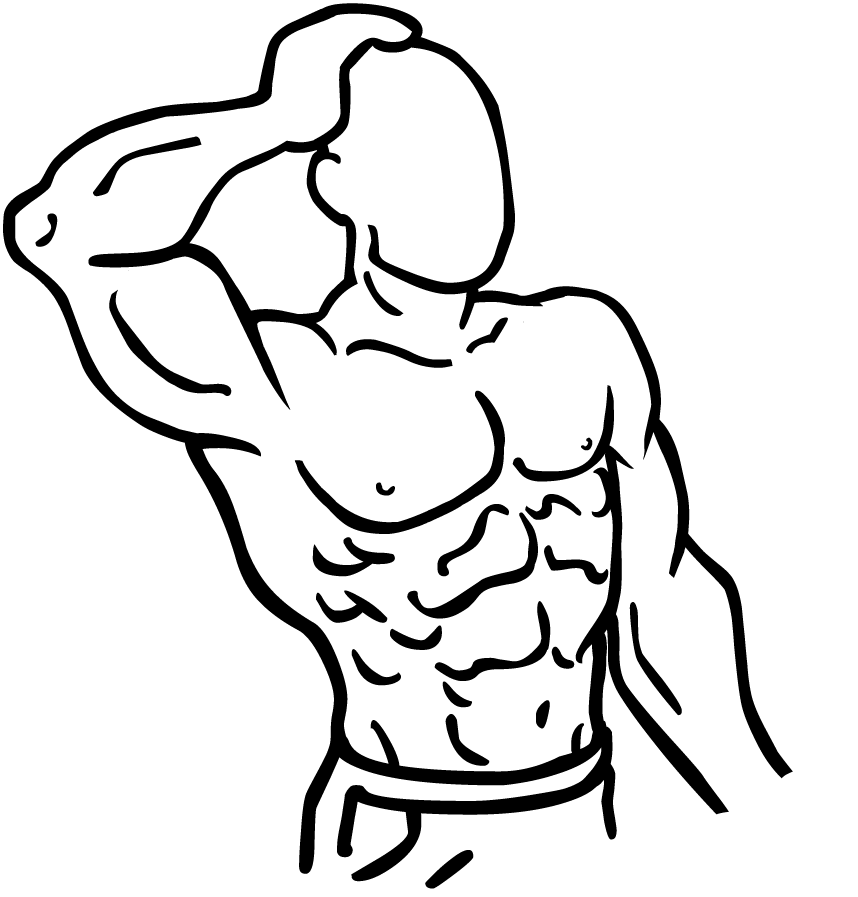

== Isometrics in combination with dynamic exercise ==
Isometric training is rarely used by itself and it is usually incorporated into a wider training regime. For instance, an isometric plank may be incorporated into a plyometrics regime. In addition, when a subject performs a dynamic movement, supportive muscle groups can work isometrically. For example, if a person squats while holding a dumbbell in front of their chest, then their arm action will be relatively isometric, whilst their leg action will be dynamic. Such a relationship between an isometric hold and a dynamic movement is often found in weightlifting: participants commonly hold a barbell overhead with straight arms whilst straightening their legs as they stand up from a squat position. This allows for the legs to be primarily responsible for the lifting of the weight.

In most sporting contexts, however, the use of a pure isometric action is rare. In skiing, for example, the skier consistently maintains a crouched position. Whilst this may be considered to be an isometric hold, there is also an amount of dynamic movement as the skier alters how deep the crouch is during their travel. Thus, isometrics can be said to be involved in and supportive of the overall skiing action, even though it is not solely isometric in nature.

In weight training and calisthenics, it is often the case that one phase of the exercise is more difficult to perform than others. If the exerciser tends to fail at this point then it is referred to as a sticking point. An isometric hold may be incorporated to strengthen the exerciser's action at this point. For instance, a sticking point in a heavy back squat is usually the lowest position reached. An isometric hold can be adopted in this position in order to strengthen the lifter's ability to hold the weight there. Over a period of training this can help them to lift the weight more easily from this position and thereby eliminate the sticking point.

== Isometric presses as preparation ==
The isometric preloading of muscles is instinctively performed in order to generate power to be used in subsequent dynamic movements: a fundamental element of this muscular preloading is the performance of an isometric press action. An everyday example is a person getting up off a chair. They first raise their posterior off the chair and then perform a pressing action downwards on their bent legs. As the bent legs resist the downward force upon them in equal measure, an isometric press is generated. From this point, the person then straightens and stands up. A more dynamic example is a vertical jump. Here, the jumper crouches down and adopts a similar isometric press before powering upwards into the jump. The employment of isometric presses in order to aid explosive power movements is also found in sports such as boxing. Here, the boxer may bend their lead leg, while positioning their torso and its respective bodyweight over it, so there exists equal forces between the upwards force of the bent leg and the downward force of the torso. The boxer then throws a lead hook from this position and the forces from the isometric press are channelled into the punch and help to increase its overall power. Such a channelling of force fundamentally represents the purpose of an isometric preload: which is as a preparatory action to aid a subsequent power movement.

Examples of preparatory isometric presses in sport

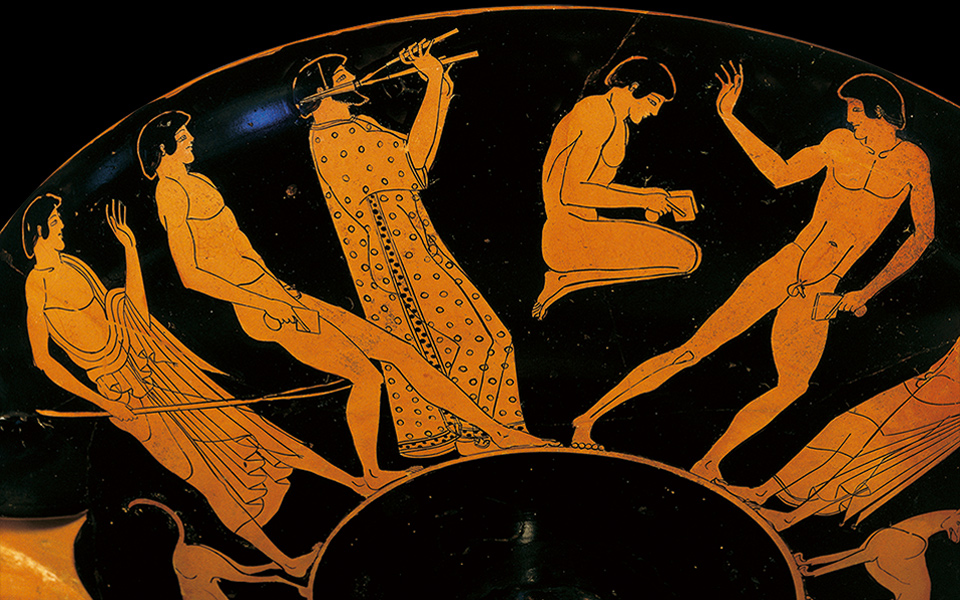
The jumper on the left performs a distinctive isometric press, primarily by applying downward pressure onto his bent rear leg. This acts as a means of preloading the muscles prior to engaging in a jump from standing. The jumper to the right of him is mid-flight.

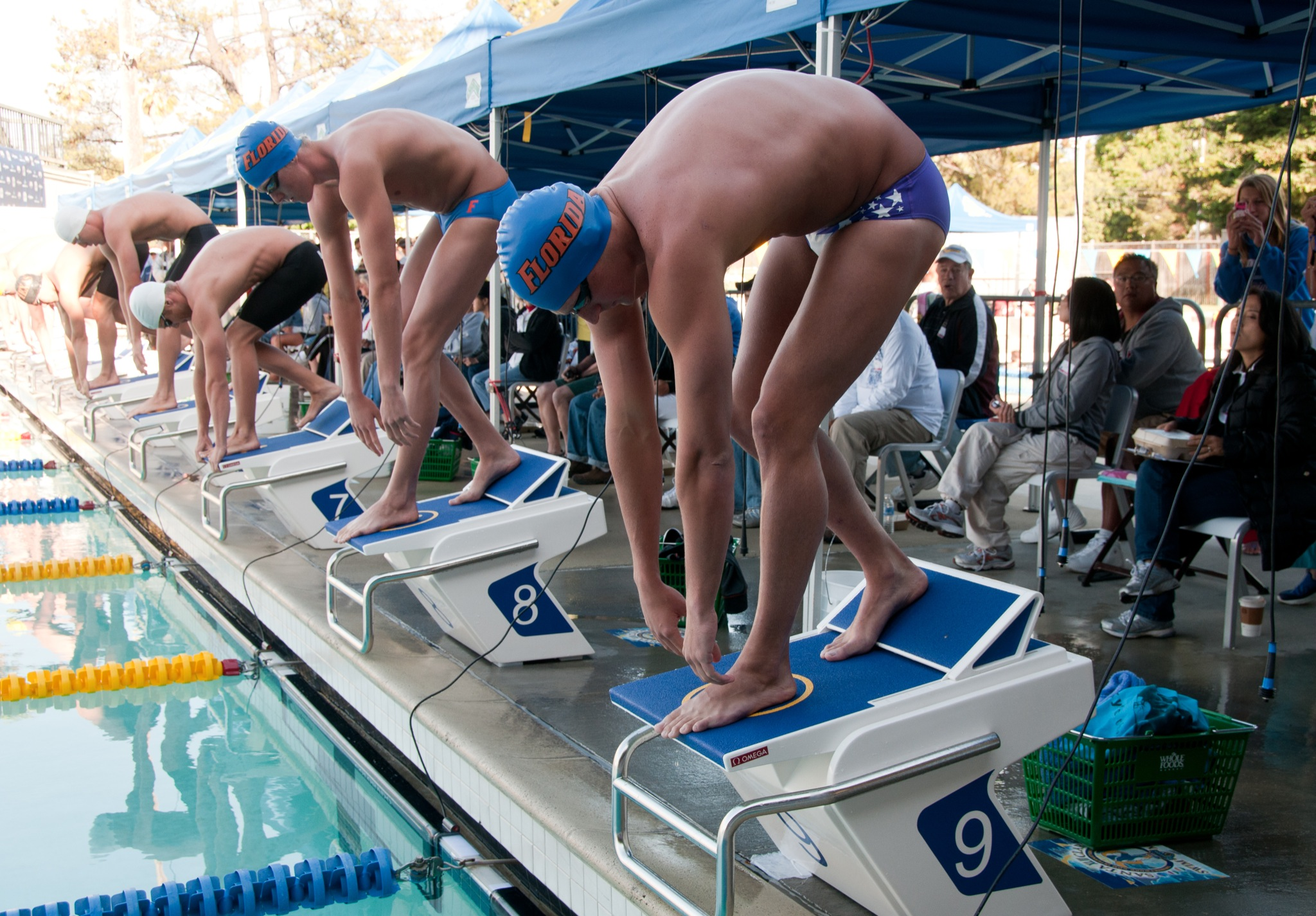
Olympian Ryan Lochte (near) standing on top of the wedged starting blocks. Each swimmer performs a preparatory isometric press by applying downward pressure onto their bent legs. This serves to preload the muscles and helps to make the subsequent dive more powerful.

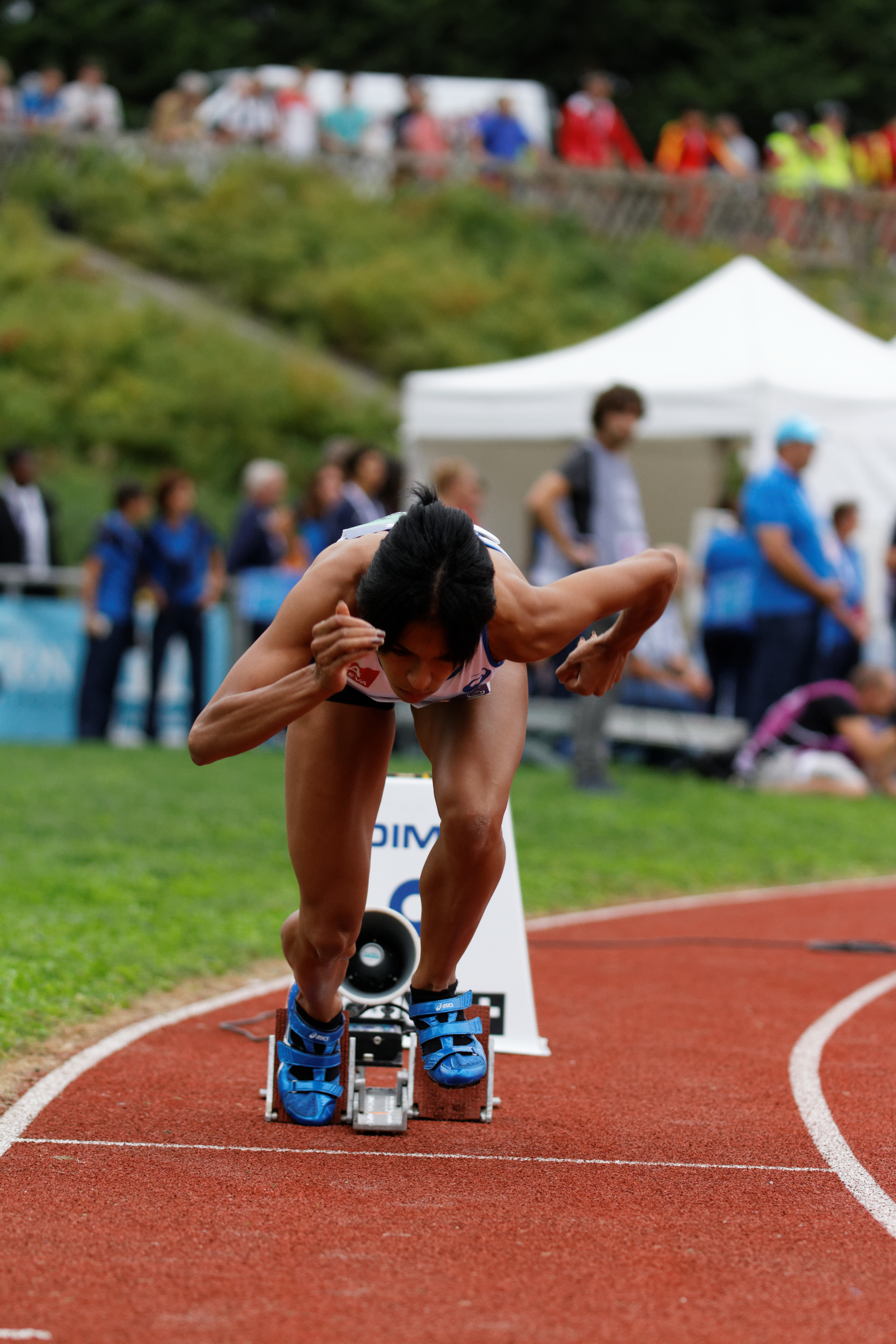
This sprinter's initial crouch in the blocks allowed her to preload her muscles and channel the force generated from this into her first strides forwards.

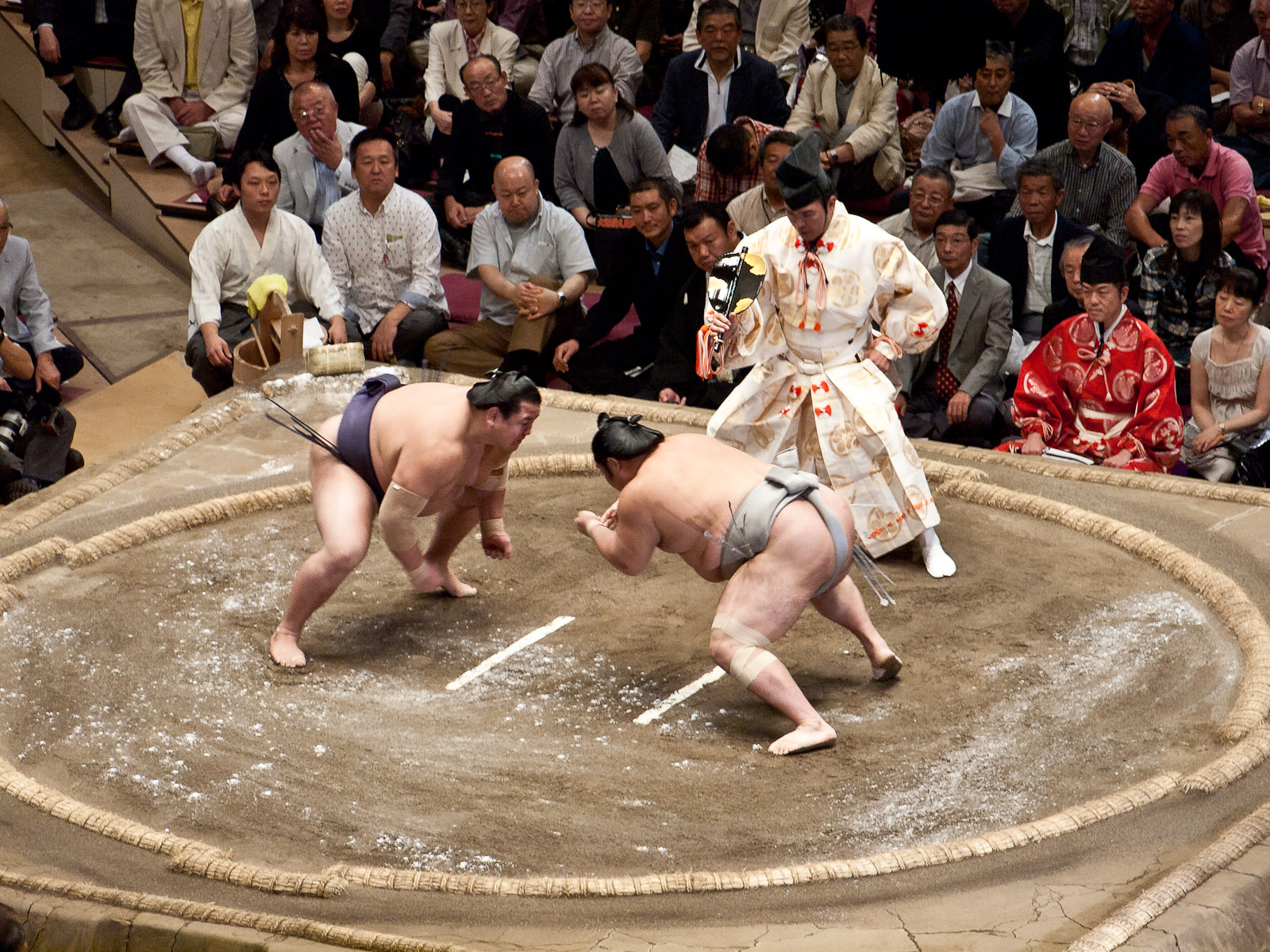
Sumo wrestlers just beginning to charge forwards after crouching down and performing an isometric press. The press enables them to charge into their opponent more powerfully, which is especially useful when the match begins.

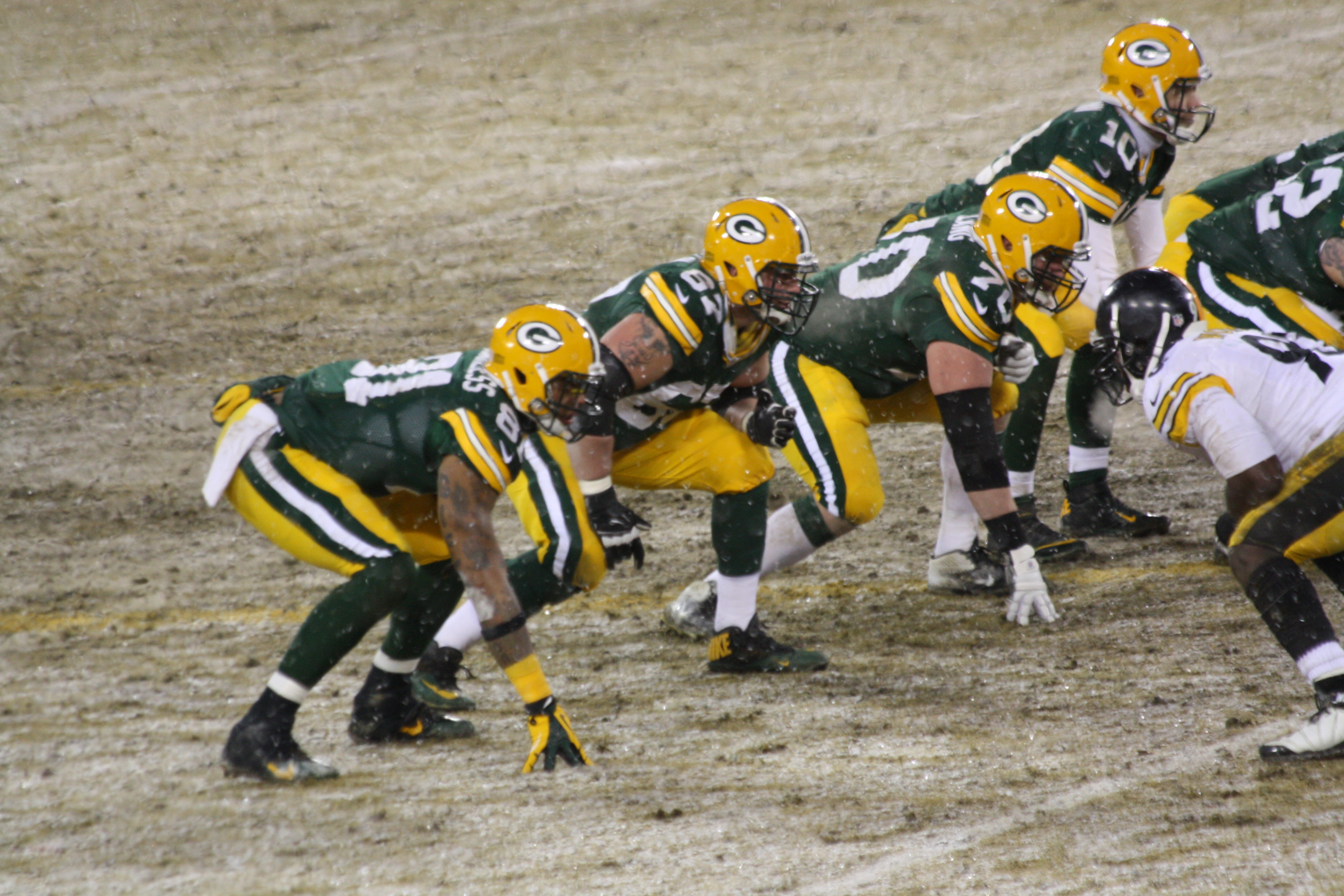
American Football players line up against each other and crouch down into an isometric press position. This allows them to rush forward more powerfully when the play begins; this is particularly useful in regard to tackling or blocking an opponent.

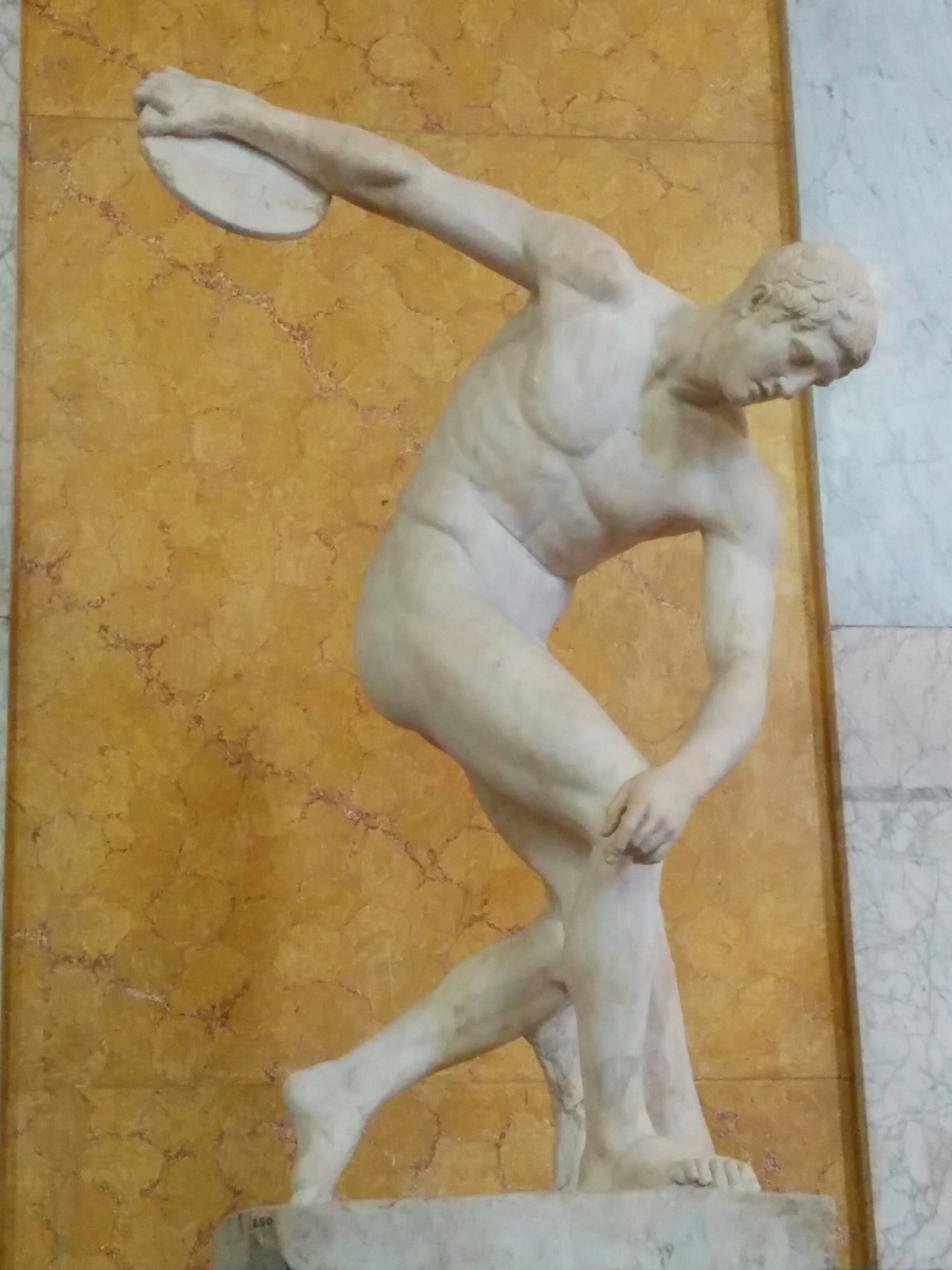
A discus thrower performs an isometric press by applying downward pressure onto his bent right leg. This allows the throw to be performed more powerfully.

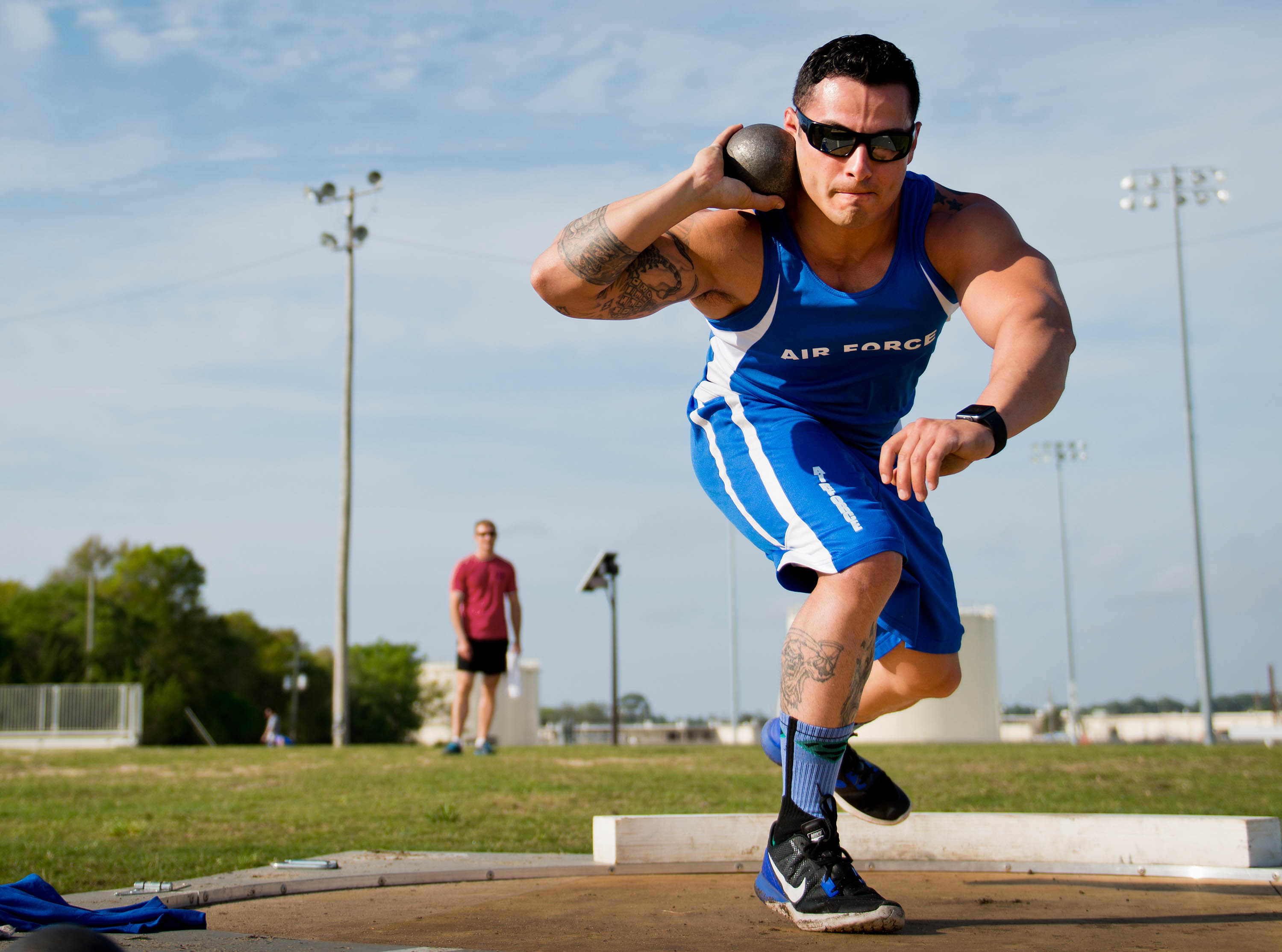
A shot putter performs an isometric press by applying downward pressure onto his bent right leg. This will allow him to turn and spring forwards more powerfully, and channel the muscular force generated by the press into the throw.

== Force measurement devices for isometric actions ==
- Force measurement plate: This involves the subject standing on a force measurement plate. Their bodyweight and their downward muscular force presses down on the plate which registers a reading. The subject's downwards muscular force is usually based upon them pressing or pulling against something which precipitates a downwards pressing action from them. For example, for a mid-thigh pull exercise, the subject pulls upwards on a fixed barbell which is positioned around their mid-thigh area. This action causes them to push downwards with their feet and exert pressure, additionally to their bodyweight, onto the plate.
- Dynamometer: A dynamometer is a device which involves two handles being pushed, pulled or squeezed together, or pushed or pulled apart, in order to register a reading. As the handles are typically extremely stiff there is very little movement and the action remains predominantly isometric in nature. For example, a dynamometer can be used to measure grip strength: it is held in one hand and the participant attempts to squeeze its two handles together; this registers a force measurement on the gauge.
- Electromyograph: An electromyograph measures muscle activation levels through the use of electrodes which are either placed on the muscle in the form of pads, or inserted into the muscle in the form of needles. It is able to measure muscle activation levels for isometric holds as well as for presses and pulls. Typically there is a strong correlation between the mechanical measurement of applied force and the measurement of muscle activation by electromyography.

== History ==
=== Müller and Hettinger ===
In the 1950s, German scientists Dr. Erich Albert Müller and Theodor Hettinger "observed that contractions involving less than about one third of maximum strength do not train the muscle. If the contraction of a muscle exceeds one third of its maximum strength, its mass grows and hence also its strength". The study at the Max Planck Institute consisted of over 200 experiments over a ten-year period. Theodor Hettinger published his book Physiology of Strength. They both developed a training program based on isometrics exercise.

In the 1960s, professor James A. Baley put isometrics to the test with a class of 104 college students at the University of Connecticut to study the results on tests measuring increases in strength, endurance, coordination, and agility. The original article showed significant gains after a 4 week program of isometric exercises. Isometric exercises were first brought to the modern American public's attention in the early days of physical culture, the precursor to bodybuilding. Many bodybuilders had incorporated isometric exercises into their training regimens.

== Medical uses ==
Isometric exercises can also be used at the bedside to differentiate various heart murmurs; the murmur of mitral regurgitation gets louder as compared to the quieter murmur of aortic stenosis. They can also be used to prevent disuse syndrome in a limb that has been immobilized by a cast following a fracture.

Isometric exercises are recommended in case of injury. The exercises help maintain strength and promote recovery. A 2023 meta-analysis found that isometric exercise is effective in reducing hypertension.

== NASA studies ==
NASA has researched the use of isometrics in preventing muscle atrophy experienced by astronauts as a result of living in a zero gravity environment. Isometrics, muscle lengthening and muscle shortening exercises were studied and compared. The outcome showed that while all three exercise types promoted muscle growth, isometrics failed to prevent a decrease in the amount of contractile proteins found in the muscle tissue. The result was muscle degradation at a molecular level. As contractile proteins are what cause muscles to contract and give them their physical strength, NASA concluded that isometrics may not be the best way for astronauts to maintain muscle tissue.

== See also ==
- Isometric exercise device
- Physical exercise
- Physical fitness
- Power training
- Strength training
- Supercompensation
- Unilateral training
- Weight training
