= La Santé par les Sports =

Health, fitness and bodybuilding magazine published in France

La Santé par les Sports (Health through Sports) was a health, fitness and bodybuilding magazine published in France first published in July 1911. It absorbed La Culture physique and L'Athlète in 1914 but then did not publish any further issues until three last ones in 1920, by which time it was the organ of the Societe de l'encouragement a l'amelioration de la race.
