= Edmond Desbonnet =

French academic and photographer

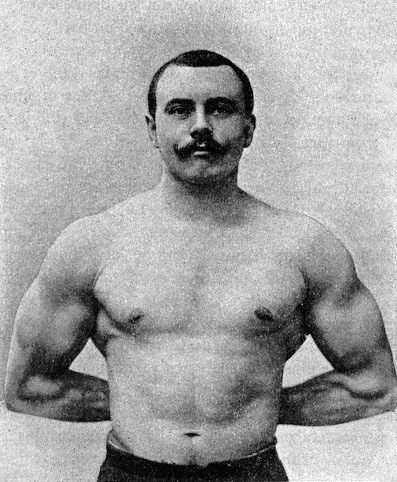
- Edmond Desbonnet
- Born: 1867
- Died: 1953 (aged 85–86)

Edmond Desbonnet (1867–1953) was a French academic and photographer who championed physical culture. He made physical education fashionable in Belle Époque France through the publication of fitness journals and by opening a chain of exercise clubs.

== Journals ==
- La Culture Physique
- La Santé par les Sports

== Books ==
- La Force Physique: traité d’athlétisme Paris: Berger Levrault & Cie (1901)
- Les Rois de la Lutte (1910)
- Les Rois de la Force, (1911, The Kings of Strength)
