= Eugen Sandow =

Prussian bodybuilder (1867–1925)

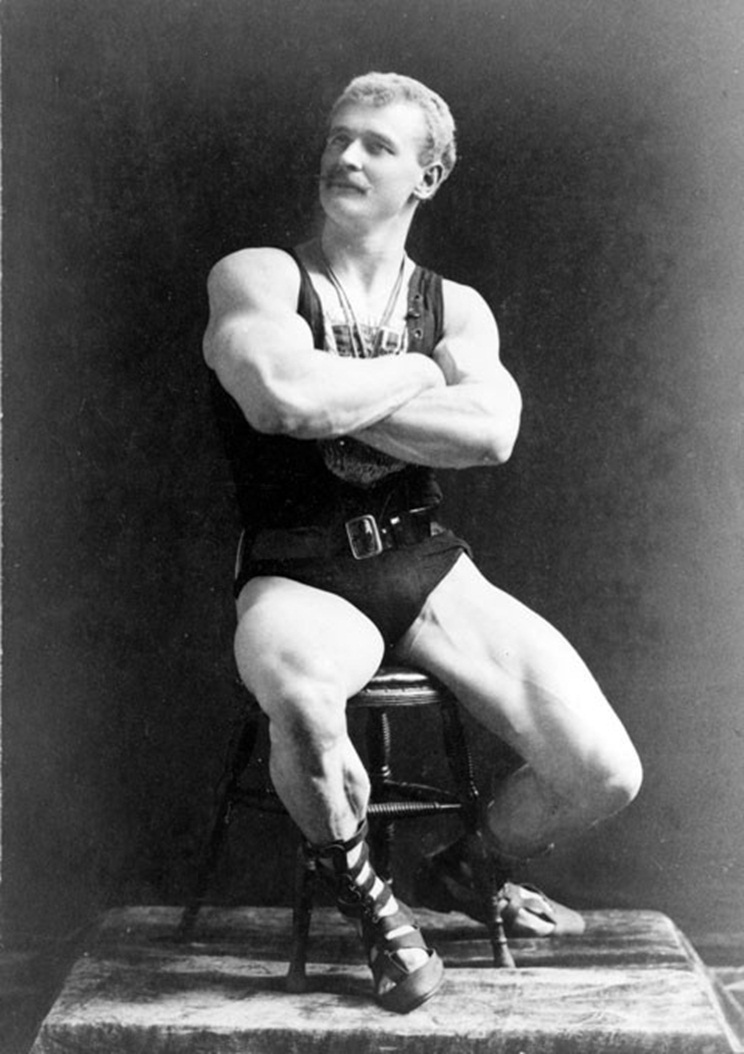
- Born: Friedrich Wilhelm Müller; 2 April 1867; Königsberg, Kingdom of Prussia (now Kaliningrad, Russia)
- Died: 14 October 1925 (aged 58); Kensington, London, England
- Resting place: Putney Vale Cemetery
- Other name: Eugene Sandow
- Spouse: Blanche Brooks (m. 1896)
- Children: 2

Signature
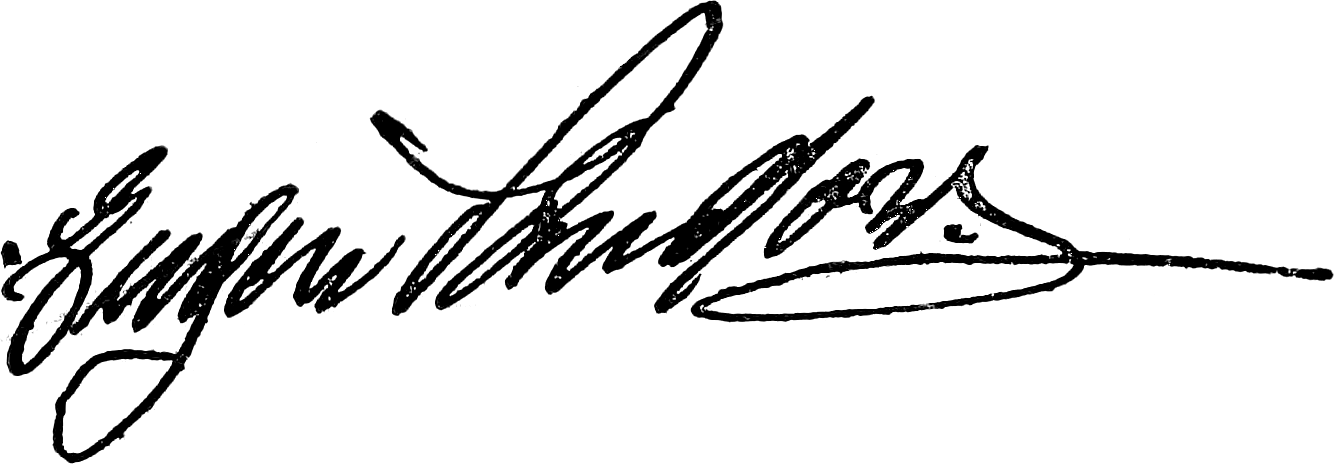

Eugen Sandow (born Friedrich Wilhelm Müller, German: [ˈfʁiːdʁɪç ˈvɪlhɛlm ˈmʏlɐ]; 2 April 1867 – 14 October 1925) was a German bodybuilder and showman from Prussia. He was born in Königsberg, and became interested in bodybuilding at the age of ten during a visit to Italy.

After a time in the circus, Sandow studied under strongman Ludwig Durlacher in the late 1880s. On Durlacher's recommendation, he began entering strongman competitions, performing in matches against leading figures in the sport such as Charles Sampson, Frank Bienkowski, and Henry McCann. In 1901 he organised what is believed to be the world's first major bodybuilding competition. Set in London's Royal Albert Hall, Sandow judged the event alongside author Sir Arthur Conan Doyle and athlete/sculptor Charles Lawes-Wittewronge. Sandow is known as the "father of modern bodybuilding".

== Early life ==
Sandow was born in Königsberg, Prussia (now Kaliningrad), on 2 April 1867. His father was German, and his mother was of Russian descent. The family members, originally Jewish, were Lutherans and wanted him to become a Lutheran minister. He left Prussia in 1885 to avoid military service and traveled throughout Europe, becoming a circus athlete and adopting Eugen Sandow as his stage name, adapting and Germanizing his Russian mother's maiden name, Sandov.

In Brussels, he visited the gym of a fellow strongman, Ludwig Durlacher, better known under his stage name "Professor Attila". Durlacher recognized Sandow's potential, mentored him, and in 1889 encouraged him to travel to London and enter a strongmen competition. Sandow beat the champion and won fame and recognition for his strength. This launched him on his career as an athlete. For the next four years, Sandow refined his technique and crafted it into popular entertainment.

== Career ==
Sandow, 1894 film

Florenz Ziegfeld wanted to display Sandow at the 1893 World's Columbian Exposition in Chicago, but Ziegfeld knew that Maurice Grau had Sandow under a contract. Grau wanted a weekly salary of US$1,000 (equivalent to $35,833 in 2025). Ziegfeld could not guarantee that much but agreed to pay 10 percent of the gross receipts.

Ziegfeld found that the audience was more fascinated by Sandow's bulging muscles than by the amount of weight he was lifting, so Ziegfeld had Sandow move in poses which he dubbed "muscle display performances". These displays were added to his feats of strength with barbells. He added chain-around-the-chest breaking and other colorful displays to Sandow's routine, and Sandow quickly became Ziegfeld's first star.

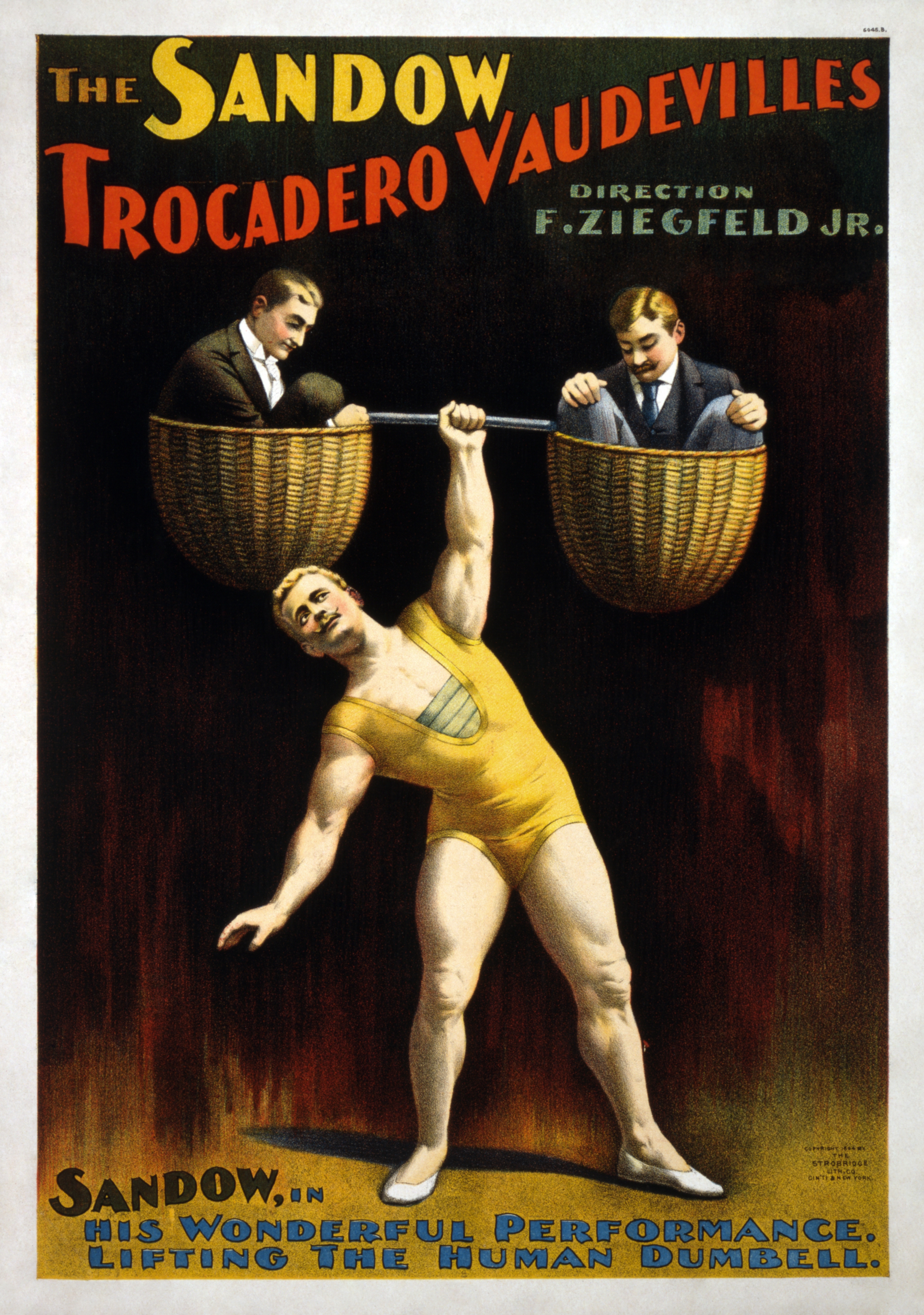
1894 poster for the Sandow Trocadero Vaudevilles, produced by F. Ziegfeld Jr. in one of his first productions

In 1894, he was featured in the series of three short actuality films, Sandow, by the Edison Studios. The film includes only part of his act and features him flexing his muscles rather than any feats of physical strength.

Though the content of the film reflects the audience's focus on his appearance, it uses the unique capacities of the new medium. Film theorists have attributed the appeal being the striking image of a detailed image moving in synchrony, much like the example of the Lumière brothers' Repas de bébé where audiences were reportedly more impressed by the movement of trees swaying in the background than the events taking place in the foreground. In 1894, Sandow appeared in a short Kinetoscope film that became part of the Library of Congress.

In April 1894, Sandow gave one of his "muscle display performances" at the California Midwinter International Exposition of 1894 in Golden Gate Park, San Francisco at the "Vienna Prater" Theater.

While he was on tour in the United States, Sandow made a brief return to England to marry Blanche Brooks, from Manchester. However, due to stress and ill health he returned permanently to recuperate.

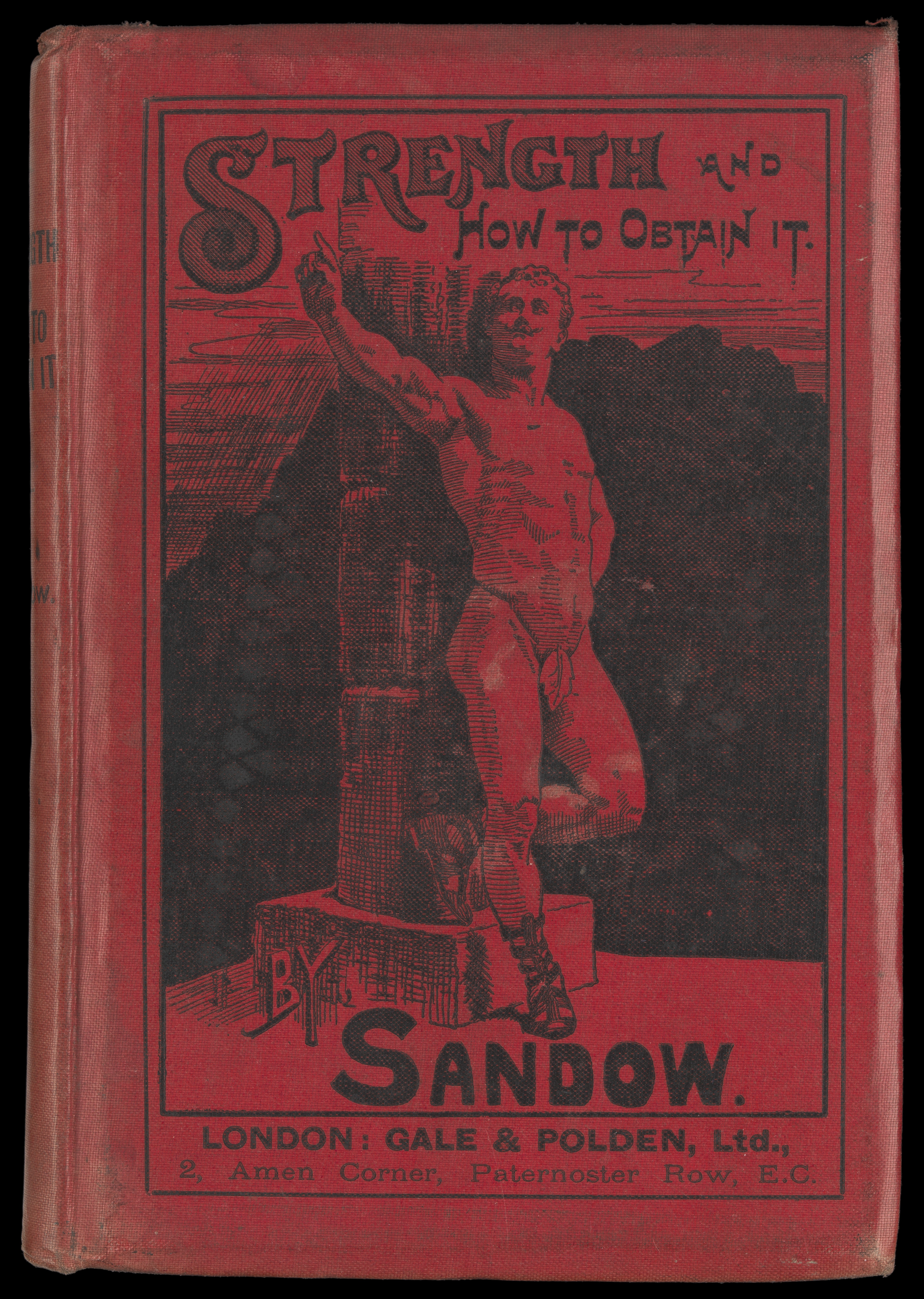
Strength, And How To Obtain It by Eugen Sandow was published in 1897 shortly before the start of his monthly periodical.

He was soon recovered, and opened the first of his Institutes of Physical Culture, where he taught methods of exercise, dietary habits and weight training. His ideas on physical fitness were novel at the time and had a tremendous impact. The Sandow Institute was an early gymnasium open to the public for exercise. In 1898, he founded a monthly periodical, originally titled Physical Culture and renamed Sandow's Magazine of Physical Culture that was dedicated to all aspects of physical culture. This was accompanied by a series of books published between 1897 and 1904 – the last of which coined the term "bodybuilding" in the title (spelled "body-building").

He worked hard at improving exercise equipment, and had invented various devices such as rubber strands for stretching and spring-grip dumbbells to exercise the wrists. In 1900, William Bankier wrote Ideal Physical Culture in which he challenged Sandow to a contest in weightlifting, wrestling, running, and jumping. When Sandow did not accept his challenge, Bankier called him a coward, a charlatan and a liar.

In 1901, Sandow organized the world's first major bodybuilding competition in London's Royal Albert Hall. The venue was so full that people were turned away at the door. The three judges presiding over the contest were Sir Charles Lawes the sculptor, Sir Arthur Conan Doyle the author, and Sandow.

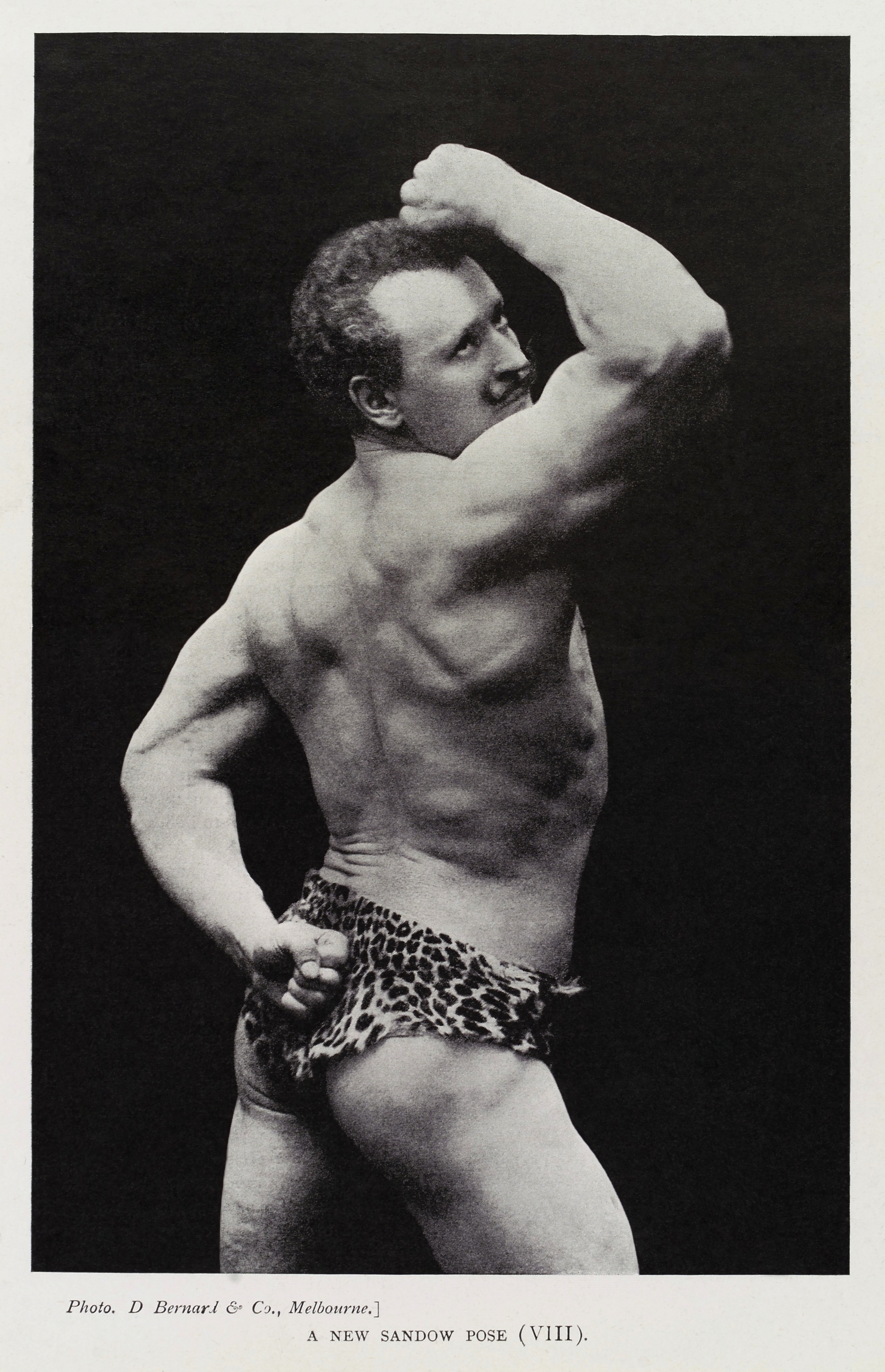
"A New Sandow Pose (VIII)" from Sandow's Magazine of Physical Culture (1902)

In 1902, Sandow was defeated by Katie Brumbach in a weightlifting contest in New York City. Brumbach lifted a weight of 300 pounds (140 kg) over her head, which Sandow lifted only to his chest. After this victory, Brumbach adopted the stage name "Sandwina" as a feminine derivative of Sandow.

In 1906, Sandow was enabled to buy the lease of 161 (formerly 61) Holland Park Avenue, due to a generous gift from an Indian businessman, Sir Dhunjibhoy Bomanji, whose health had improved dramatically after he had adopted Sandow's regime. This grand four-storey end-of-terrace house – which was named Dhunjibhoy House after his benefactor – was his home for 19 years.

He toured the world, including South Africa, India, Japan, Australia, and New Zealand. At his own expense, from 1909, he provided training for would-be recruits to the Territorial Army, to bring them up to entrance fitness standards, and did the same for volunteers for active service in World War I.

In 1911, he was designated special instructor in physical culture to King George V, who had followed his teachings.

== The Grecian Ideal ==
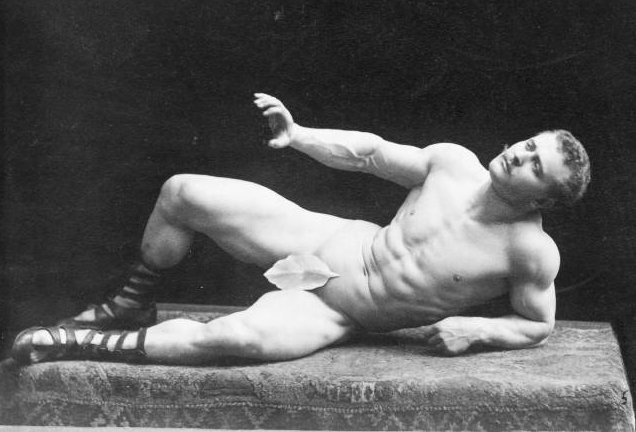
Sandow models the statue The Dying Gaul, illustrating his Grecian Ideal. Sandow would often equip a fig leaf to cover his genitals to further emulate popularly available samples of Greco-Roman sculpture and its traditions of heroic nudity

Sandow's physique resembled those of classical Greek and Roman sculpture because he measured the statues in museums and helped to develop "The Grecian Ideal" as a formula for the "perfect physique". Sandow built his physique to the exact proportions of his Grecian Ideal, and is considered the father of modern bodybuilding, as one of the first athletes to intentionally develop his musculature to predetermined dimensions. In his books Strength and How to Obtain It and Sandow's System of Physical Training, Sandow laid out specific prescriptions of weights and repetitions to achieve his ideal proportions.

== Personal life ==
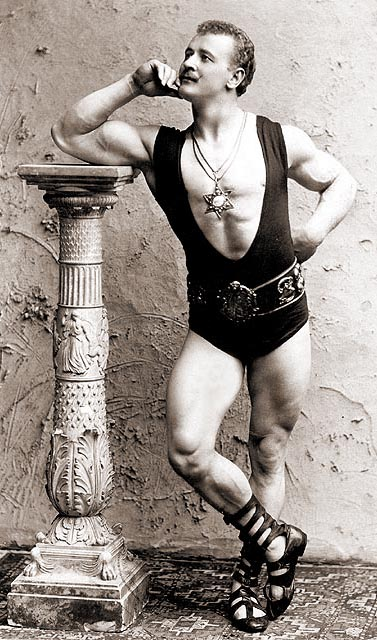
In 1894

Sandow married Blanche Brooks, daughter of the well-known photographer Warwick Brooks, of Manchester, England, in 1894. They had two daughters, Helen and Lorraine.

== Influence on yoga ==
Sandow was acclaimed on his 1905 visit to India, when he was already a "cultural hero" in the country at a time of strong nationalistic feeling. The scholar Joseph Alter suggests that Sandow was the person who had the most influence on modern yoga as exercise, which absorbed a variety of exercise routines from physical culture in the early 20th century.

== Death ==
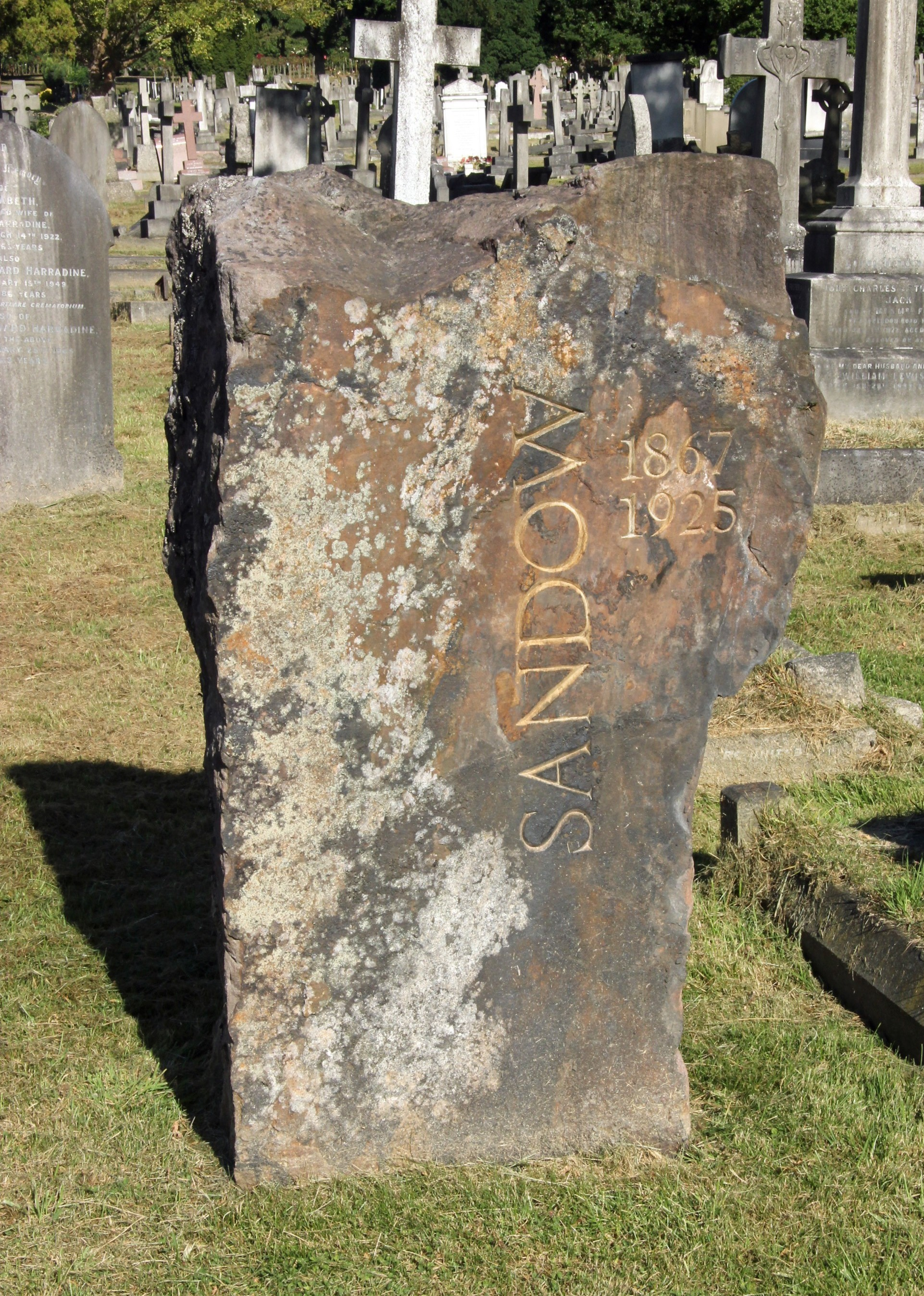
Sandow's grave is at Putney Vale Cemetery. (2012)

Sandow died at his home in Kensington, London, on 14 October 1925 of what newspapers announced as a brain hemorrhage at age 58. It was allegedly brought on after straining himself, without assistance, to lift his car out of a ditch after a road accident two or three years earlier. However, without an autopsy, his death was certified as due to aortic aneurysm.

Sandow was buried in an unmarked grave in Putney Vale Cemetery at the request of his wife, Blanche. It is rumoured that he was unfaithful to his wife later in marriage, and she refused to mark his grave; however, the cause of this strife is a mystery, because she refused to talk about it. In 2002, a gravestone and black marble plaque was added by Sandow admirer and author Thomas Manly. The gold lettered inscription reads "Eugen Sandow, 1867–1925, the Father of Bodybuilding". In 2008, the grave was purchased by Chris Davies, Sandow's great-grandson. Manly's items were replaced for the anniversary of Sandow's birth that year and a new monument, a 1.5 ton natural pink sandstone monolith, was put in its place. The stone, simply inscribed "SANDOW 1867–1925", is a reference to the ancient Greek funerary monuments called steles.

== Legacy ==
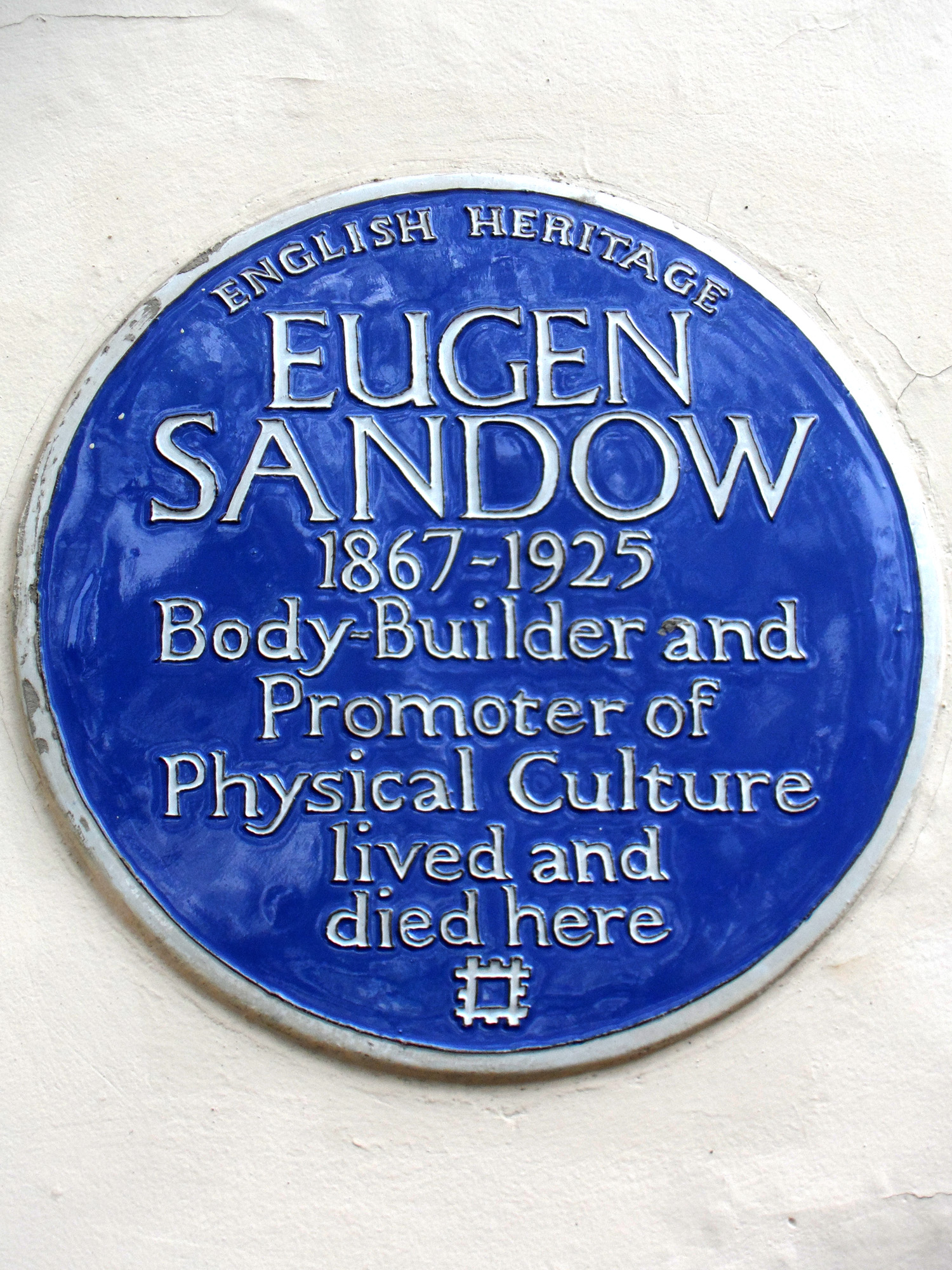
161 Holland Park Avenue, Holland Park, London W11 4UX, Royal Borough of Kensington and Chelsea

Sandow was befriended by King George V, Thomas Edison, Sir Arthur Conan Doyle and classical pianist Martinus Sieveking. He was portrayed by the actor Nat Pendleton in the Academy Award-winning film The Great Ziegfeld (1936).

"Physical Strength and How to Obtain It by Eugen Sandow" appears as one of the books in the catalog of the personal bookshelves of Leopold Bloom in Chapter 17 (Ithaca, line 1397) of James Joyce's 1922 novel Ulysses.

As recognition of his contribution to the sport of bodybuilding, a bronze statue of Sandow sculpted by Frederick Pomeroy has been presented to the winner of the Mr. Olympia contest, a major professional bodybuilding competition sponsored by the International Federation of Bodybuilders, since 1977. This statue is simply known as "The Sandow".

In 2013, Eugen Sandow was portrayed by the Canadian bodybuilder Dave Simard in the film Louis Cyr. In 2018, a biographical film was released, titled Sandow.

English Heritage put a blue plaque on his house at 161 Holland Park Avenue in west London in 2009; it describes him as a "Body-Builder and Promoter of Physical Culture".

== Publications ==
- Sandow, Eugen, "How to Preserve Health and Attain Strength," illustrated with photographs of the author, Cosmopolitan, vol. XVII, no. 2, June 1894, pp. 169–176.
- Sandow's System of Physical Training (1894)
- Sandow on Physical Training (1894)
- Strength and how to Obtain It (1897)
- Sandow's Magazine of Physical Culture (1898–1907)
- Body-Building
- Strength and Health
- The Construction and Reconstruction of the Human Body (1907) [with a foreword by Arthur Conan Doyle]
- Life is Movement (1919)

== See also ==
- List of male professional bodybuilders
- List of female professional bodybuilders
- Strongman (strength athlete)
