= Jake Roberts =

American professional wrestler (born 1955)

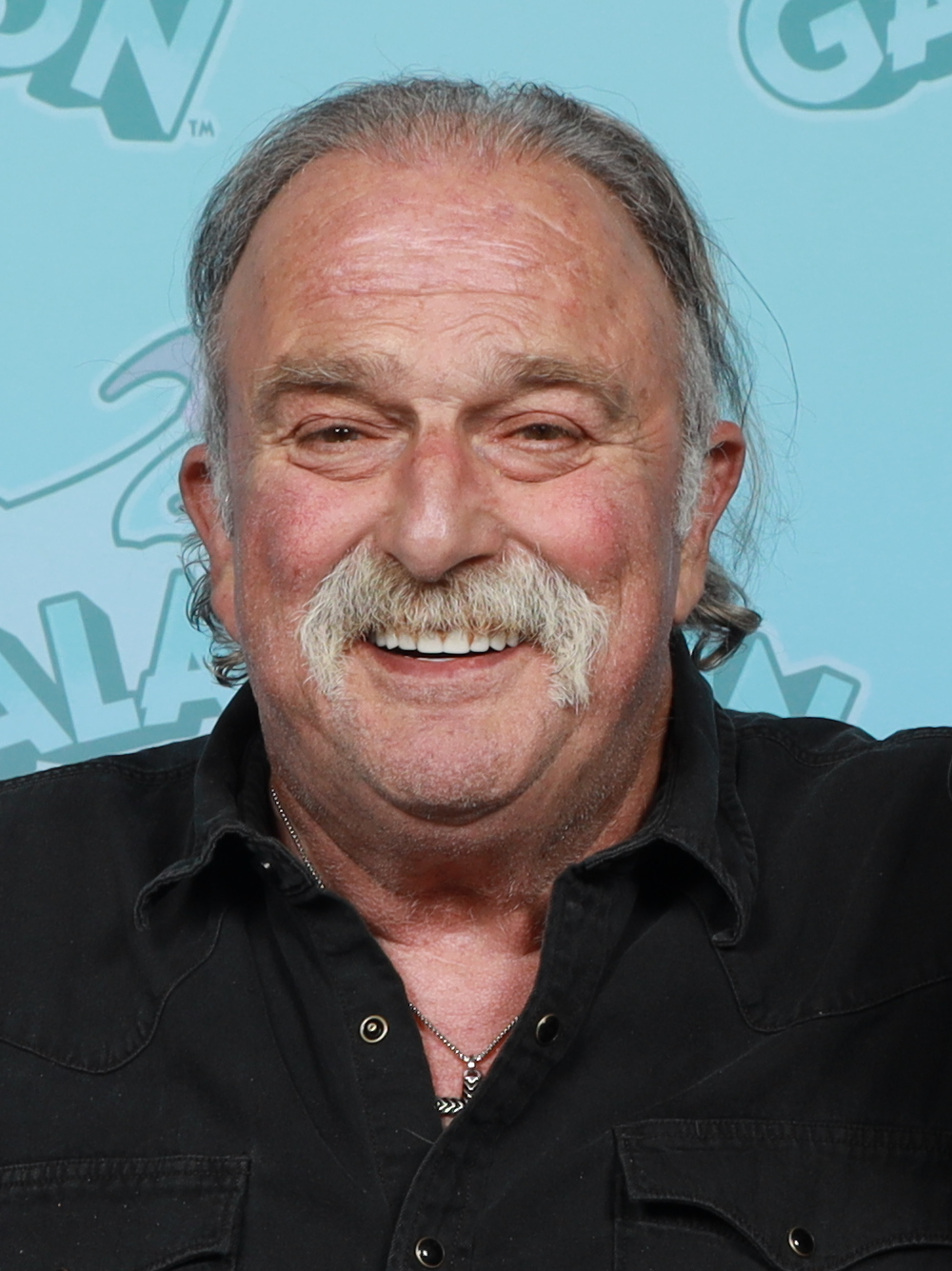
- Roberts in 2024

Personal information
- Born: Aurelian Smith Jr. May 30, 1955 (age 71) Gainesville, Texas, U.S.
- Spouses: Karen Rauschuber (m. 1973; div. 1982) Cheryl Hagood (m. 1984; div. 1997) Judy Lynn (m. 2006; div. 2011)
- Life partner: Cheryl Hagood (2023–present)
- Children: 8
- Relatives: Grizzly Smith (father); Sam Houston (half-brother); Rockin' Robin (half-sister)

Professional wrestling career
- Ring name(s): El Diablo; Fred Platt; Jake "The Snake" Roberts; Jake Roberts; Jake Smith Jr. The Snake; The Texan
- Billed height: 6 ft 6 in (198 cm)
- Billed weight: 249 lb (113 kg)
- Billed from: Stone Mountain, Georgia
- Trained by: Buck Robley; Moose Morowski
- Debut: 1975
- Retired: 2018

YouTube information
- Channel: The Snake Pit with Jake Roberts
- Years active: 2021–present
- Genre: Professional wrestling
- Subscribers: 33.3 thousand
- Views: 6.4 million
- Last updated: 27 June 2026

Aurelian Smith Jr. (born May 30, 1955) better known by the ring name Jake "the Snake" Roberts, is an American actor, podcaster and retired professional wrestler. He is best known for his two stints in the World Wrestling Federation (WWF, later called WWE); the first between 1986 and 1992, and the second between 1996 and 1997. He wrestled in the National Wrestling Alliance in 1983, World Championship Wrestling in 1992, and the Mexico-based Asistencia Asesoría y Administración between 1993 and 1994 and again in 1997. He appeared in Extreme Championship Wrestling during the summer of 1997 and made appearances for Total Nonstop Action Wrestling from 2006 through 2008. He also worked for All Elite Wrestling from 2019 to 2026.

Throughout his career, Roberts, often considered one of professional wrestling's most iconic figures, was known for his intense and cerebral promos, dark charisma, extensive use of psychology in his matches, and innovative use of the DDT finishing move (which was later named the "coolest" maneuver of all time by WWE). He often brought snakes into the ring, most famously a python. He was one of the subjects of the 1999 documentary film Beyond the Mat. In 2012, he moved in with fellow wrestler Diamond Dallas Page to seek help in getting his life back on track following years of alcohol and drug addiction, a period covered in the 2015 documentary The Resurrection of Jake the Snake. He was inducted into the WWE Hall of Fame on April 5, 2014, and the Professional Wrestling Hall of Fame and Museum in 2020.

== Early life ==
Aurelian Smith Jr. was born in Gainesville, Texas. His father, Aurelian "Grizzly" Smith (1932–2010), also a wrestler, left his mother when she was 17 by which time she had given birth to another child. Roberts lived with his grandmother until she died in 1966, forcing him to move back to live with his father and his new wife. Roberts had a strained relationship with his pedophilic father, and was sexually and physically abused by his stepmother during his childhood, which included vaginal penetration - his father was doing the same thing to his daughters (Aurelian Jr.'s sisters) too. He has a half-brother, Michael Smith, and a half-sister, Robin Smith, both of whom also became wrestlers. During the late 1980s, all three wrestled at the same time for the WWF (now WWE).

== Professional wrestling career ==
=== Early career (1974–1986) ===
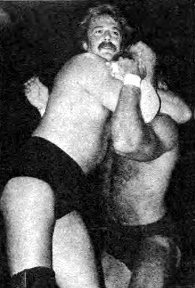
Roberts in a 1981 match against Paul Orndorff

Roberts started his career in 1974 in the Louisiana area, as a referee and a year later, made his debut as a wrestler, making his name in Mid-South Wrestling, Mid-Atlantic Championship Wrestling and Georgia Championship Wrestling. Roberts had trouble developing his character, so in the late 1970s he traveled to Canada to wrestle. While in Stampede Wrestling, Roberts feuded with Big Daddy Ritter, later known as the Junkyard Dog.

It was in Georgia Championship Wrestling during 1983 that Roberts became part of Paul Ellering's stable, the Legion of Doom, and began a feud with Ron Garvin over the NWA National Television Championship that lasted into 1984. In 1984, Roberts entered World Class Championship Wrestling (WCCW) joining up with "Gentleman" Chris Adams and Gino Hernandez in their feud against the Von Erichs, winning the WCCW Television title and 6-Man Tag Team title (with Adams and Hernandez). Roberts returned to Mid-South Wrestling for 1985, ending his run there in February 1986 with a feud with Dick Slater after being told by management, namely Terry Taylor that he was only considered the "Number 5 babyface" even though he was getting the biggest crowd reactions.

=== World Wrestling Federation (1986–1992) ===
==== Debut and championship pursuits (1986–1990) ====
Roberts debuted in the World Wrestling Federation on March 8, 1986, at the Boston Garden defeating Jose Luis Rivera. A month later, he made his pay-per-view debut, defeating George Wells at WrestleMania 2. During the match, Roberts made Wells foam from the mouth when he wrapped his snake Damien around Wells' head; however, contrary to popular belief, he had been using the "Snake" nickname before his WWF debut, including while in Georgia Championship Wrestling.

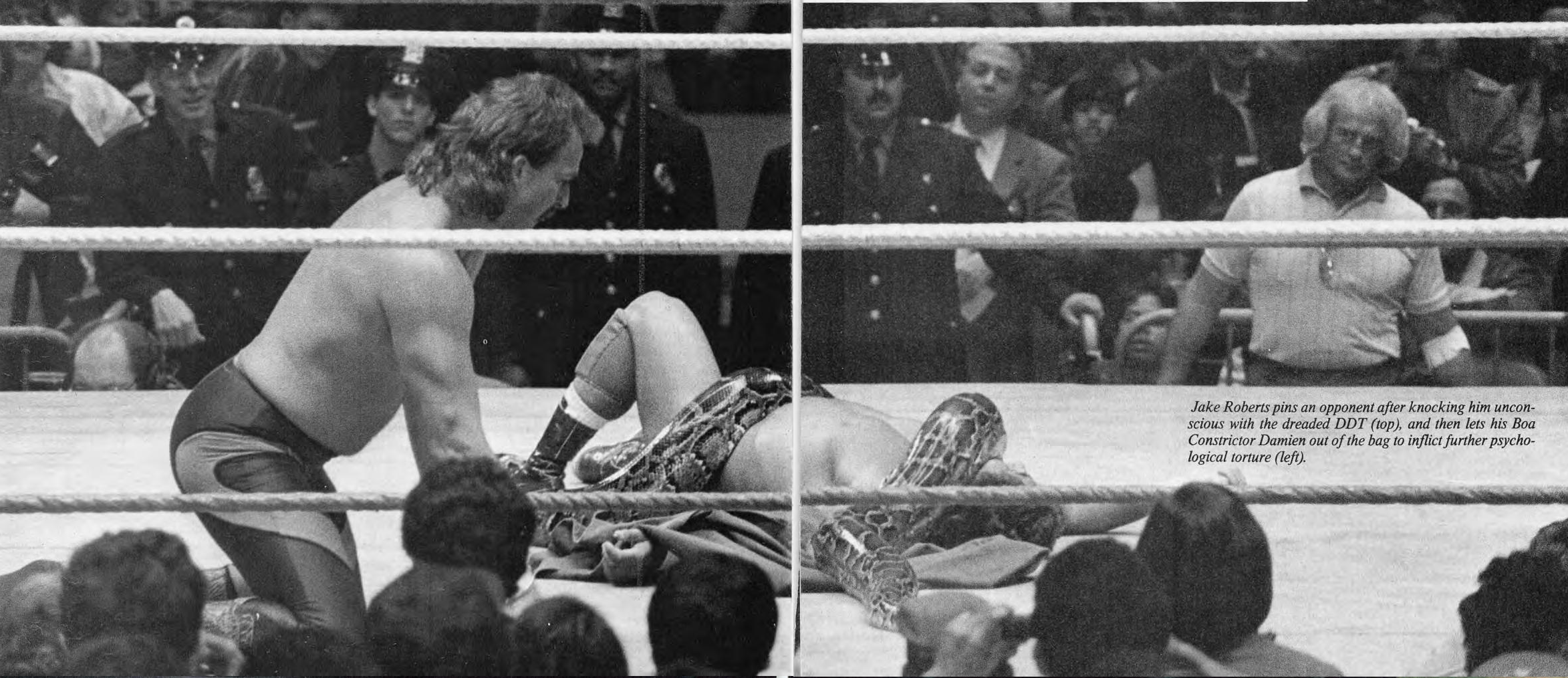
Jake Roberts (left) puts his snake, Damien, on top of Ricky Steamboat (right), circa 1986

Roberts' first major feud was against Ricky "the Dragon" Steamboat, beginning on a nationally televised episode of Saturday Night's Main Event VI in May 1986. Roberts executed the DDT on Steamboat on the exposed concrete floor right in front of his wife Bonnie and then proceeded to rest his snake Damien on top of a prone Steamboat. While Vince McMahon and booker George Scott were adamant about wanting the DDT to take place on the floor, Roberts initially refused until Steamboat told him that he would be able to adequately protect himself from injury. Unfortunately, Steamboat was unable to stop his head from hitting the concrete and was rendered unconscious, sustaining a concussion. After Steamboat's recovery, Steamboat introduced a "Komodo dragon" as his pet to combat the psychological effects of Roberts' snake. The feud continued with Steamboat winning most of the matches (losing only one because he threw Roberts back in the ring before the 10 count, while not beating the count himself), most notably a Snake Pit Match (ostensibly a no-DQ match) at The Big Event in Toronto, and the rematch on the October 1986 edition of Saturday Night's Main Event VII.

Recognizing his microphone skills, Roberts was given his own talk segment called "The Snake Pit", which debuted on the first episode of WWF Wrestling Challenge in late 1986. "The Snake Pit" was patterned after "Piper's Pit", wherein Roberts would conduct interviews with wrestlers or managers to help push wrestlers and get feuds over with the crowd. The segment was eventually moved to WWF Superstars of Wrestling (to replace "Piper's Pit" after Roddy Piper's retirement following WrestleMania III) until the final segment aired in July 1987.

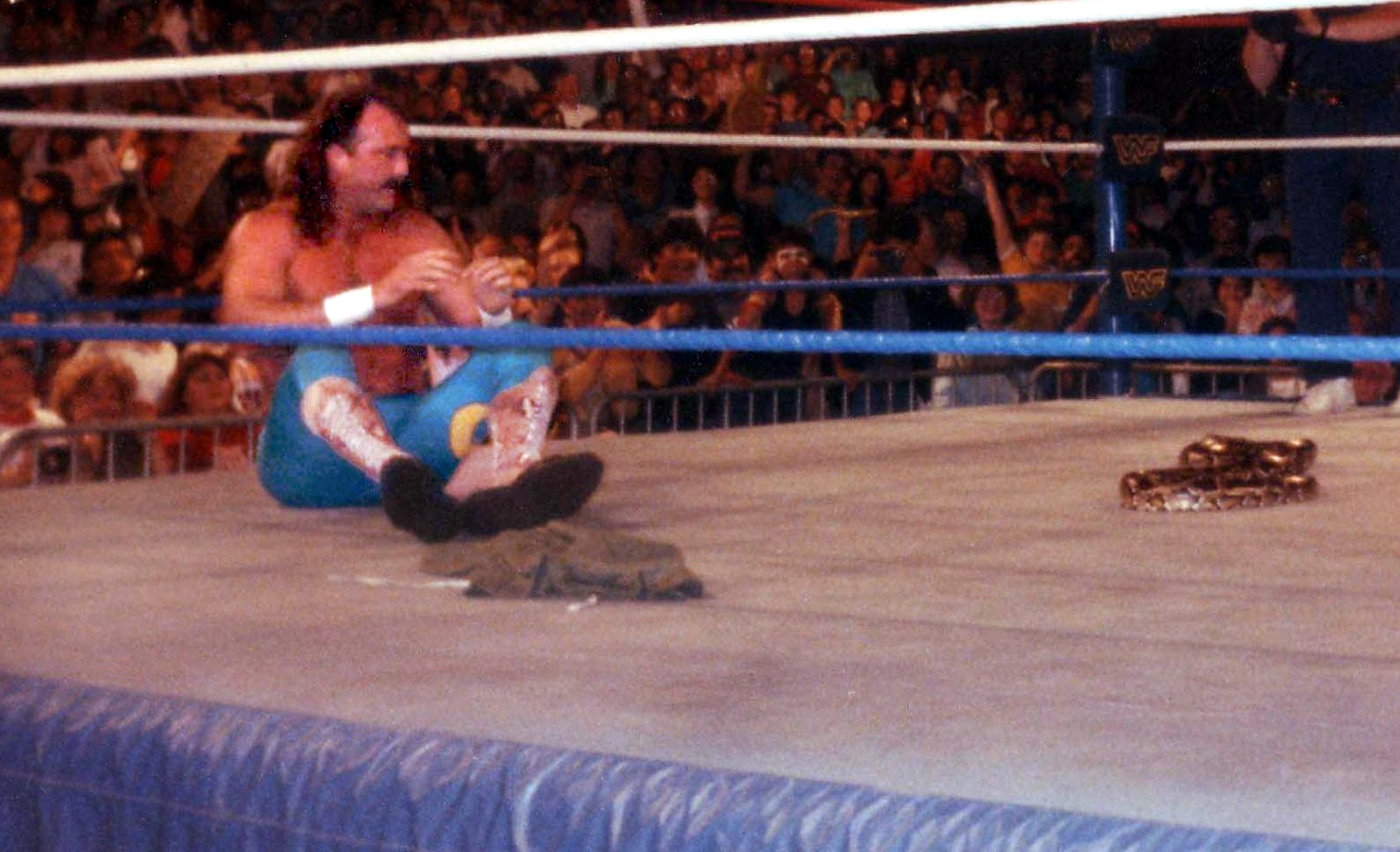
Many of Roberts' storylines revolved around the use of his snake, Damien, seen here in the middle of the ring (March 7, 1989)

In late 1986, Roberts began to enjoy an upsurge in fan popularity, despite the WWF's attempts to cast him as an unpopular villain. In November 1986, Roberts challenged Randy Savage for the Intercontinental Championship. Before the match, announcer Vince McMahon said the fans would probably support Savage against the disliked Roberts. However, to the surprise of both McMahon and fellow broadcaster Jesse "The Body" Ventura, the fans cheered loudly for Roberts throughout the bout. The match ended in a double disqualification. Around the same time, the WWF had also tried to set Roberts up as a nemesis to then fan-favorite WWF World Heavyweight Champion Hulk Hogan, and challenging him for the title. However, after Roberts hit Hogan with a DDT during an episode of The Snake Pit, fans responded positively to the attack by chanting "DDT" rather than for Hogan, and McMahon abandoned his plans for a feud between them. Years later in a 2015 shoot interview, Roberts jokingly thanked the fans for ruining what would have been the biggest (and most profitable) run of his career as at the time Hogan was the biggest and most popular babyface and a run against Hogan would have meant main event television and pay-per-view matches.

He officially turned face when he feuded with The Honky Tonk Man, an Elvis impersonator, who attacked Roberts with a guitar during his interview segment The Snake Pit. The Honky Tonk Man's guitar shot actually injured Roberts' neck, as at the time guitars were not prepared to break easily. The Honky Tonk Man denies that he purposefully injured Roberts, although Honky's manager Jimmy Hart, as well as a video of the incident (seen on the Pick Your Poison DVD) suggests otherwise with Roberts later claiming that he was picking pieces of wood out of his back for weeks after. The attack led to their match at WrestleMania III in which Roberts had Detroit native Alice Cooper (a known lover of snakes) in his corner. After Honky Tonk won the Intercontinental Championship from Ricky Steamboat, Roberts unsuccessfully challenged him for the Championship several times throughout the rest of 1987. The initial plan was for Roberts to win the Intercontinental Championship shortly after The Honky Tonk Man's win over Steamboat and begin an angle with "the Million Dollar Man" Ted DiBiase, but because of the injuries from the guitar shot, the decision was made to keep the belt with The Honky Tonk Man.

He then had a feud with "Ravishing" Rick Rude and his manager Bobby "the Brain" Heenan, who began a gimmick of selecting a woman from the crowd to kiss after each match. On the April 23, 1988 edition of WWF Superstars of Wrestling, Rude chose Roberts' real-life wife Cheryl, who refused the kiss and revealed that she was in fact the wife of Jake "the Snake". After Rude began insulting Roberts, Cheryl slapped him, angering Rude before Roberts ran out for the save. This began a heated feud throughout the summer of 1988, which escalated after Rude began wearing a pair of tights emblazoned with a visage of Mrs. Roberts, which an irate Roberts tore off.

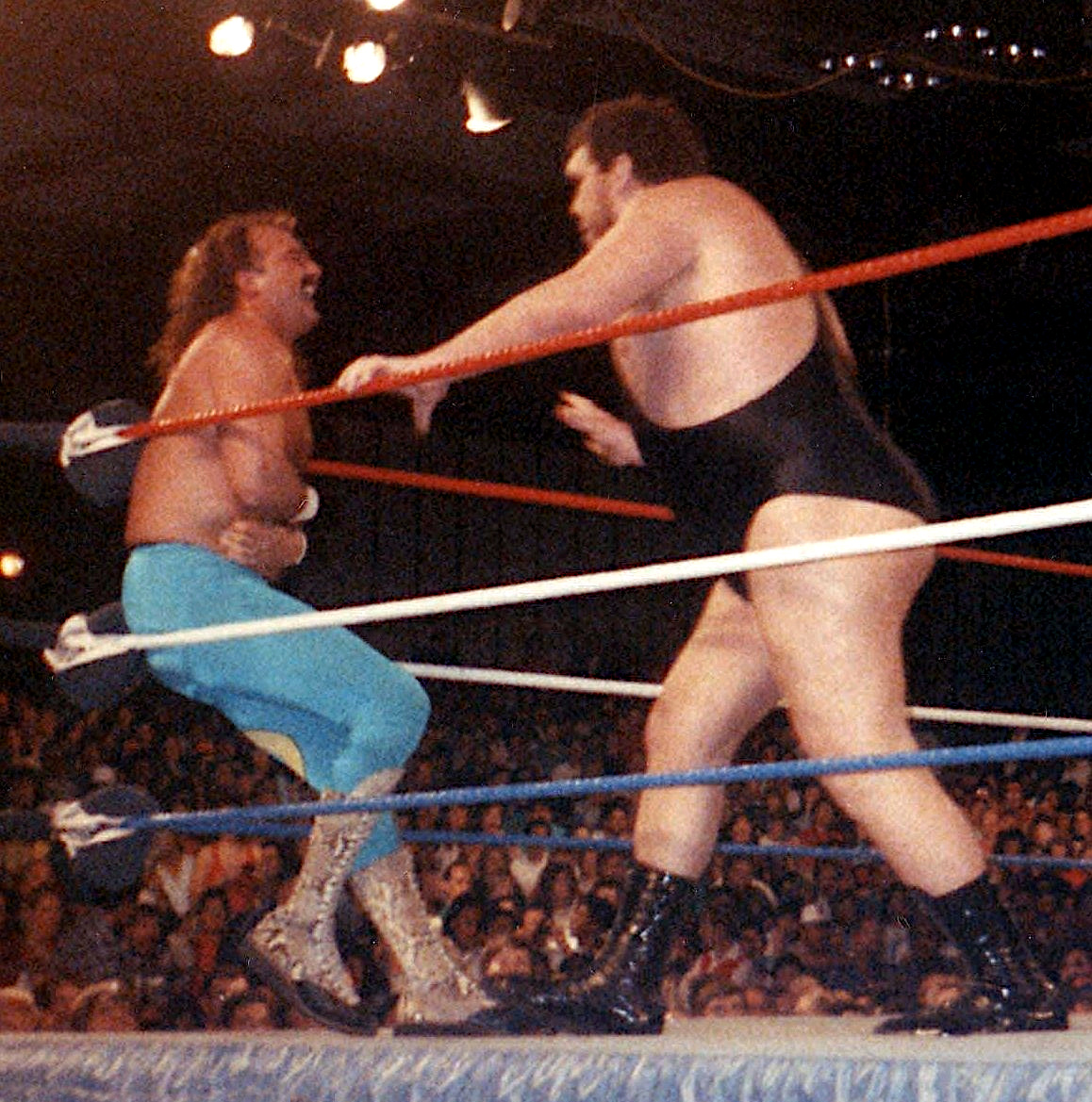
André the Giant feuded with Roberts based on André's fear of snakes (pictured March 7, 1989)

Roberts moved from the feud with Rude into a feud with André the Giant who was also managed by Bobby Heenan. On the March 11, 1989, episode of Saturday Night's Main Event XX, André got involved in a match between Rick Rude and Brutus "the Barber" Beefcake, siding with fellow Heenan Family member Rude. Roberts came to the ring to help Beefcake, who eventually won by disqualification. Roberts used his snake Damien to scare Andre into an eventual "heart attack". Although the subsequent feud on the house show circuit saw André victorious after most of those matches, Roberts can claim a victory via disqualification over André after The Giant attacked special guest referee and former foe Big John Studd at WrestleMania V.

During the first match of their feud in Los Angeles, André treated it like Jake was a jobber out there for an old fashioned squash match, giving Roberts virtually no offence and not selling anything Jake did to him. After the match, an angry Roberts physically confronted André in the locker room and told him that he had to give Jake something out there or the program just wouldn't work. The Giant simply answered "We're OK Boss. We're good now" and they went on from there. Jake later learned it had been a test from André to see if he went running to complain to management, or if he had the guts to confront him man to man. From then on André had no problem selling Jake's offence in the ring.

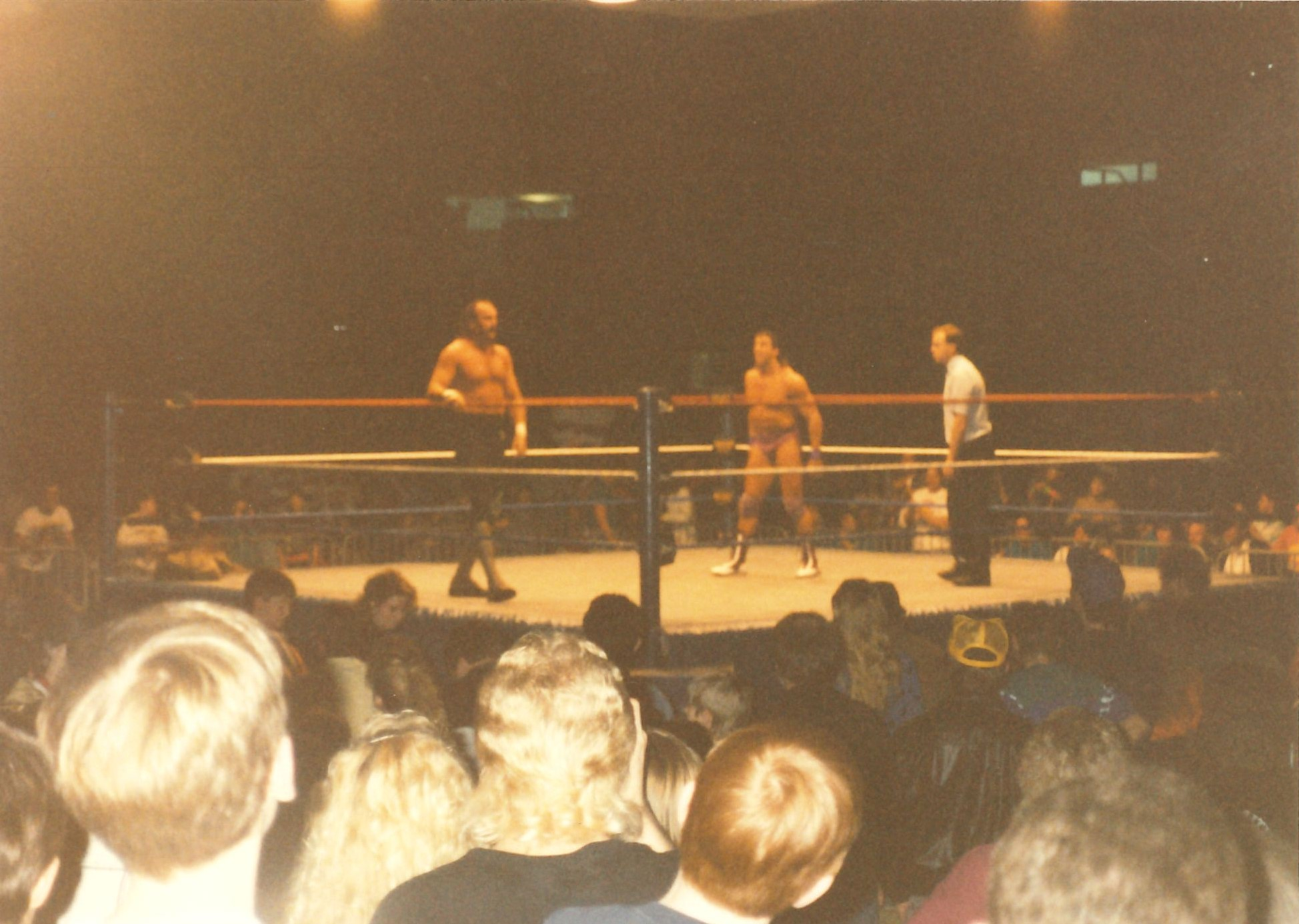
Jake Roberts vs. Rick Martel at a WWF Live Event House Show in Omaha, Nebraska 1991

Shortly after his feud with André had ended, Roberts entered into a feud with Ted DiBiase. Instead of fighting for the Intercontinental Championship, the prize of the feud was DiBiase's own Million Dollar Championship. It was at this time that Roberts' problems with the discs in his back were publicly acknowledged, as DiBiase attacked Roberts after a victory over his bodyguard Virgil on WWF Superstars of Wrestling. In the attack, Roberts was (storyline) injured by DiBiase and needed time off to have surgery to repair the damage. Roberts returned and feuded with DiBiase throughout the end of 1989 into 1990, including a point where Roberts stole DiBiase's Million Dollar Belt, daring him or Virgil to reach into the canvas sack where Damien was to retrieve it. The culmination of their feud took place at WrestleMania VI at the Skydome in Toronto, wherein a match where the Million Dollar Belt was on the line, DiBiase gained a count-out victory over Roberts, thus regaining his non-sanctioned title. After the match, Roberts mounted an offensive against DiBiase and Virgil and then began giving away DiBiase's "money" including giving some money to actress Mary Tyler Moore who was seated at ringside.

Following a brief feud with Bad News Brown in the summer of 1990, Roberts also feuded with Rick "the Model" Martel throughout late 1990 into early 1991, after Martel (kayfabe) blinded Roberts by spraying his cologne "Arrogance" into his eyes. Roberts went so far as to wear white contact lenses to "prove" his blindness. After several months, the feud culminated in a match at WrestleMania VII, in which both contestants were blindfolded (though both Roberts and Martel did later confess to having some limited vision due to mesh holes in the masks - these were briefly visible due to Jake putting his hand inside the mask after donning it shortly before the start of the match). The bout ended after Roberts was able to "locate" Martel and deliver a DDT.

==== Final feuds and departure (1991–1992) ====
In early to mid-1991, Roberts engaged in a feud with Earthquake who "squashed" Damien with a pair of Earthquake splashes during their match on the April 27 (taped March 26) edition of WWF Superstars of Wrestling. In reality, Roberts' bag contained hamburger meat intended to look like a snake and a small mechanical device to depict movement, Roberts said in several shoot interviews that he wanted to be tied up in the ring ropes while Earthquake squashed Damien, because the original plan was for Roberts to be knocked out of the ring and not let him see it. The feud was advanced when, several weeks later, Earthquake appeared on WWF Prime Time Wrestling and served "Quakeburgers" to co-host Lord Alfred Hayes and Vince McMahon, later claiming that the meat was ground from Damien's carcass, which prompted McMahon to angrily knock the burger tray out of Earthquake's hands. Roberts later introduced a new snake, Damien's "big brother" Lucifer. Roberts and Earthquake feuded throughout most of late-spring and into the summer. Roberts defeated Earthquake on July 1, at Madison Square Garden with a DDT. The match featured André the Giant in Roberts' corner.

After the feud with Earthquake ended, Roberts slowly began changing his attitude and fans began booing Roberts and the decision was made to turn Roberts heel. In the summer of 1991, there were a series of televised vignettes featuring Ultimate Warrior turning to Roberts for help in his feud with The Undertaker. In the set-up, Roberts explained to Warrior that, after passing three tests, he would have the "knowledge of the dark side" to defeat Undertaker. The segments included Warrior being locked inside a coffin (a reprise of an incident that occurred on The Funeral Parlor, hosted by the Undertaker's manager, Paul Bearer; earlier in the year); Warrior being "buried alive" in dirt before being abandoned; and Warrior walking through a room full of live snakes to reach a chest containing "the answer". During the latter segment, Warrior opened the chest, only to be immediately bitten by a king cobra (actually a rubber prop). As Warrior "weakened" from the effects of the cobra's strike, Roberts officially turned heel and formed an alliance with The Undertaker and Paul Bearer, revealing the three were working together all along; Roberts closed the final segment by proclaiming, "I'm a snake. Never trust a snake.", turning Roberts heel. A series of matches were planned, but the feud was canceled after Ultimate Warrior was fired by the WWF the night of SummerSlam.

After SummerSlam, Roberts was placed in a feud with Randy Savage. During the post-SummerSlam wedding reception of Savage and Miss Elizabeth (in reality they had been married since 1984), Elizabeth opened a gift package containing a live cobra. Roberts and the Undertaker attacked Savage, until Sid Justice ran them off. A short feud with Sid ensued when Sid was scheduled to wrestle "El Diablo" and the Undertaker came out and accepted the challenge to face Sid. Paul Bearer offered "El Diablo" what appeared to be a bribe to walk away. As the match began, "El Diablo" came back to the ring and hit Sid. Then "El Diablo" unmasked revealing himself as Jake. Roberts proceeded to unleash a king cobra on Sid, until Hacksaw Jim Duggan intervened. Sid and Jake wrestled on Superstars a week later. But soon, Sid injured his biceps, which forced the feud to end.

Roberts immediately began berating Randy Savage in a series of promos, aware that Savage – who had lost a retirement match to Ultimate Warrior at WrestleMania VII – was unable to exact revenge. On the November 23 (taped October 21) edition of WWF Superstars of Wrestling, Roberts goaded Savage into the ring and brutally attacked him, eventually tying Savage into the ropes and got the king cobra to bite his arm; the snake was devenomized and, according to Roberts' DVD Pick Your Poison, he had trouble getting the cobra to release his bite. According to Roberts, on the day the angle was shot, he had to let the cobra bite him on his leg at Savage's request to convince him that the snake had been devenomized and Savage would regularly check on Roberts to make sure he had no side effects from the bite. The segment went on longer than planned, and Savage's blood was clearly visible as it dripped from the puncture wounds. Savage stated in a shoot interview that his arm swelled and he developed a high fever afterward and had to be checked at a hospital. He also stated that the cobra died a week after the angle and he joked that the cobra must have got the venom from him.

WWF president Jack Tunney reinstated Savage as an active wrestler to get revenge for the attack. To explain the absence of the cobra, Tunney "banned" Roberts from ever bringing a snake to the ring again. Savage and Roberts feuded for the next few months. Their first match was at This Tuesday in Texas pay-per-view on December 3 in San Antonio, Texas, which saw Savage earn a victory over Roberts. Despite this, Roberts would perform the DDT on Savage 3 times after the match and things came to a head when Roberts slapped Miss Elizabeth. The feud continued through the early part of 1992 and included Savage eliminating Roberts from that year's Royal Rumble match for the vacant WWF World Heavyweight Championship. The feud ended on Saturday Night's Main Event XXX, with Savage getting the win. Roberts, livid at having lost to him and having received two of Savage's flying elbow drops (one of which after the match), was helped backstage. Enraged, he grabbed a steel chair and said that he was going to hit whoever came backstage first, whether it was Savage or Elizabeth. Just as Roberts was about to swing the chair, he was stopped by the Undertaker; Roberts was distracted long enough for Savage to hit him with the chair instead. That incident helped set up Roberts' feud with the Undertaker. Roberts stated in a shoot interview with Jim Ross that the feud with Savage had to end early because Elizabeth's parents were upset with Savage for not protecting Elizabeth when Roberts kayfabe slapped her.

Roberts appeared on The Funeral Parlor to demand answers from the Undertaker about why he stopped him from attacking Elizabeth. When Roberts was dissatisfied with the answers, he hit Bearer with a DDT and, after jamming Undertaker's hand in a coffin, began hitting him with a steel chair; however, Undertaker got up after each chair shot and eventually chased Roberts backstage dragging the coffin behind him. At WrestleMania VIII, Roberts lost the match, becoming the second man to lose to The Undertaker at WrestleMania.

The WrestleMania VIII match turned out to be Roberts' last for the WWF for nearly four years. His departure came after he was upset that WWF chairman Vince McMahon did not offer him a position on the writing staff, despite being promised such previously. After Pat Patterson stepped down from his post on the writing staff stemming from the recent sexual harassment scandal, McMahon decided that, out of respect for Patterson, the spot would be left vacant. Roberts felt he was not only being lied to, but also being betrayed. In response, he threatened to no-show WrestleMania if he was not given a release from his contract. On his Pick Your Poison DVD, Roberts expressed his regret for his actions to get a release from his contract.

=== World Championship Wrestling (1992) ===
Roberts went on to work for World Championship Wrestling (WCW) alongside his father, Grizzly Smith, where he aligned himself with The Barbarian and Cactus Jack to feud against Sting and Nikita Koloff. However, before he could officially join WCW, he had to wait 90 days. According to the Pick Your Poison DVD, Roberts had initially signed a lucrative contract under Kip Allen Frey, who was running WCW at the time. On the 87th day, Frey stepped down and was replaced by Bill Watts, for whom Roberts had legit heat with back in his days at Mid-South Wrestling. Ultimately, Roberts estimates that he went from making about $3.5 million (equivalent to $8.03 million in 2025) a year to approximately $200,000 (equivalent to $459,000 in 2025) a year.

Roberts made his first television appearance on August 2, 1992, at a Main Event taping in Baltimore, Maryland after coming through the crowd to attack Sting. His first WCW match came six days later when he defeated Marcus Alexander Bagwell on a house show in Chicago, Illinois. He would quickly ally with Cactus Jack and The Barbarian. His first major TV wrestling appearance for WCW was at Clash of the Champions XX, where his team won a 4-man elimination tag match. Roberts scored a pinfall victory over Sting, which built their feud further. His single WCW pay-per-view match was against Sting at Halloween Havoc in 1992. Their match was determined via the Spin the Wheel, Make the Deal gimmick. When the wheel stopped, it had landed on what many observers believed was the worst option — the Coal Miner's Glove match. While Halloween Havoc was the company's top-selling pay-per-view for several years, Roberts soon left WCW.

Following the loss to Sting he continued his feud, facing him on several house shows immediately after the event. On the November 2 episode of Saturday Night, Tony Schiavone conducted a sit-down interview with Roberts regarding the decision of Bill Watts to ban his bringing of the snake to ringside, and his impending first-round match against Dustin Rhodes in the first round of the King of Cable tournament. He was replaced in the tournament by The Barbarian.

=== Various promotions (1993–1994) ===
After leaving WCW, Roberts spent his next couple of years wrestling around the world. In February 1993, he took part in a tour in Australia. He won the American Wrestling Federation Heavyweight Title defeating Don Muraco on March 4. Then in April 1993, he toured Europe, particularly Austria and Germany. In September 1993, he took part wrestling a tour for New Japan Pro-Wrestling.

Roberts debuted in the Mexican promotion Asistencia Asesoría y Administración (AAA) in April 1993, causing the defeat of Konnan in the career vs. career match at Triplemanía I. Roberts' run-in started a feud that lasted until 1994 at Triplemanía II-C, in which Konnan defeated Roberts in a hair vs. hair match which Roberts got his long hair cut off and shaved bald.

In the spring of 1994, Roberts returned to the United States to wrestle for Smoky Mountain Wrestling (SMW). On May 2, he defeated Tony Anthony to win the SMW Heavyweight Championship; the title change aired on May 14. Roberts no-showed several defenses, forcing SMW to give the title back to Anthony on July 5. By the end of 1994, Roberts took a hiatus.

=== Return to WWF (1996–1997) ===
After spending over a year in hiatus, Roberts returned to WWF at the Royal Rumble in 1996, as a Bible-preacher. To go along with his new gimmick, his new albino Burmese python was named "Revelations". His gimmick also mirrored his real life, as Roberts had recently become a born-again Christian and had been preaching around the country.

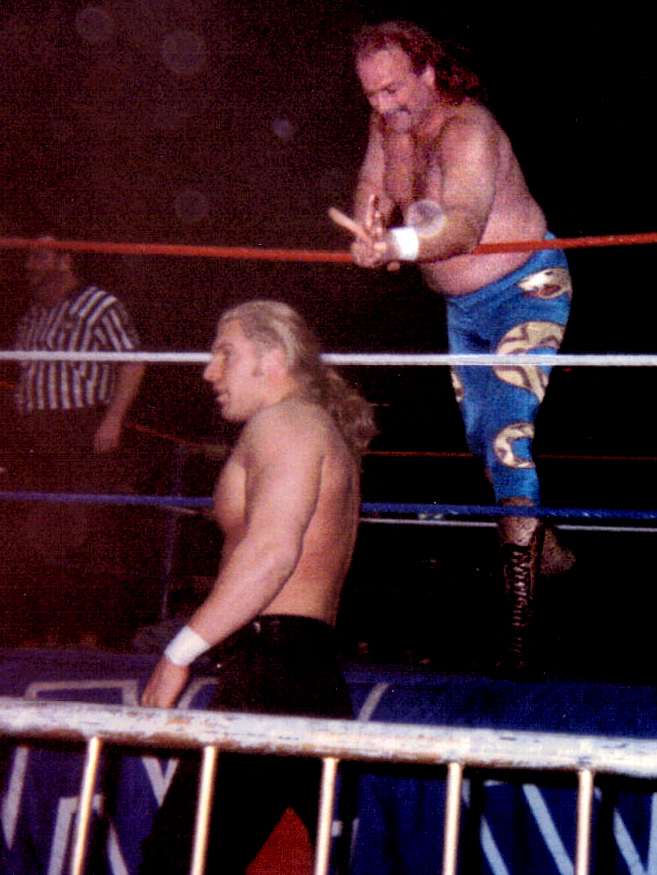
Roberts and Hunter Hearst Helmsley in 1996

During his second tenure with the company, Roberts was pushed as a "Cinderella story" and faced Stone Cold Steve Austin in the final match of the 1996 King of the Ring tournament. Changes had to be made to the match's scripting as legitimate injuries sustained earlier in the evening in a match with Vader left Roberts unable to engage in the longer, more evenly matched bout originally intended between the men. To prevent Roberts from sustaining a further injury, he was quickly defeated by Austin; in a post-match interview, Austin mocked his recital of the biblical passage John 3:16 by saying, "You sit there and you thump your Bible, and you say your prayers, and it didn't get you anywhere! Talk about your Psalms, talk about John 3:16... Austin 3:16 says I just whipped your ass!" The catchphrase helped propel Austin to the top of the WWF, and is one of the moments that is often cited as helping to kickstart the Attitude Era. Roberts next feuded with Jerry "The King" Lawler, who went to great lengths to ridicule Roberts' past alcoholism.

In early 1997, the WWF wanted Roberts to wind down his in-ring career and join the company's backstage side. Since he still loved to wrestle, he did not make this transition well. This led to a relapse with drugs and alcohol. He appeared at the 1997 Royal Rumble where he entered at no. 7 and was eliminated by Stone Cold Steve Austin. His last match with WWF was at Shotgun Saturday Night on January 25, 1997, against Salvatore Sincere in a winning effort. He was released in March 1997 after not only for being deemed too out of shape for WrestleMania, but also for being frustrated by the behavior of Shawn Michaels and Bret Hart backstage, and was a part of a creative team that had to mediate their real-life backstage bickering.

=== Extreme Championship Wrestling (1997–1998) ===
During the summer of 1997, Roberts debuted in ECW. His introduction came towards the end of a match between Lawler and Tommy Dreamer, which was the main event of the show. As the match went on, the arena lights were turned off. Moments later when the lights came back on, Roberts was already in the ring, and proceeded to give Tommy Dreamer a clothesline. He then went to the camera man and screamed; "Your God... he giveth, and he can taketh away. My God, he giveth... but he ain't got the balls to do nothin' else." He promptly clotheslined Lawler, who fell onto Dreamer for a two count before exiting the ring.

Roberts also teamed with Tommy Dreamer at the 1998 November to Remember as his mystery partner defeating Justin Credible and Jack Victory.

=== Independent circuit (1999–2018) ===
In October 1999, Roberts was one of several former NWA, WWF, and ECW wrestlers brought in to compete in the first Heroes of Wrestling event in Bay St. Louis, Mississippi. He was booked to face Jim Neidhart in one half of the card's double main event in what was billed as a "special grudge match" between the two. Roberts was so intoxicated that during the course of the night, he slurred his way through a promo before the match and staggered to, from, and around the ring during his entrance. After doing such things as pretending his snake was a penis and stroking it like he was masturbating and attempting to kiss the snake with his tongue, the show's promoter sent King Kong Bundy and Yokozuna, who were supposed to compete in the other main event match, to the ring and made the main event a tag team match with Roberts teaming with Yokozuna against Bundy and Neidhart. Roberts, who was so drunk that he could not stand up, took the fall in the match after Bundy splashed and pinned him.

In 2001, Roberts moved to Great Britain, where he began competing for Brian Dixon's All Star Wrestling. In December, he made his debut for Ricky Knight's World Association of Wrestling in Lowestoft. On October 20, 2002, Roberts became the NWA UK Hammerlock Heavyweight Champion in Maidstone, Kent, England by defeating "Vigilante" Johnny Moss. Moss regained the title the next night in Ashford, Kent, though. In November 2002, Roberts started his own wrestling promotion in the UK, called "Real Stars of Wrestling". RSOW ran three events, each headlined by Roberts vs. The Honky Tonk Man.

Roberts made his final British appearance at WAW's October Outrage show in Canvey Island, Essex, once again teaming with Steve Quintain against the UK Pitbulls. However, Roberts turned up at the show "in no fit state to compete", but went ahead with his match. Roberts cut a drunken promo paying tribute to Ray Traylor, who had died a few days before, and almost got into a scuffle with several WAW wrestlers who were sent out to defuse the situation.

Roberts made an appearance at Booker T's Houston-based Pro Wrestling Alliance (PWA) promotion, in which he cut a promo urging those who want to enter the wrestling business to not follow along his path. At one point, he said he loved the wrestling business more than anything else in the world. PWA wrestler "Rockstar" Robbie Gillmore then interrupted Roberts and attempted to make an alliance based upon the fact that Robbie wears an 80s style shirt featuring a cobra. Roberts had just said all he ever wanted was a little respect, and the Rockstar's interruption irritated him. Roberts then attacked Gillmore.

On October 6, 2007, he lost to Scott Hall at Juggalo Championship Wrestling.

In May 2009, Roberts joined the Jim Rose Circus for the Jim Rose Circus vs. Jake "The Snake" Roberts: The Legends Collide Tour. Advertised as "a grueling 40 city campaign" containing pretty girls, wrestling, amazing circus stunts, and a fist fight, the tour features Jim Rose and wrestler Sinn Bodhi as "Team Jake".

On January 29, 2011, Roberts wrestled what was billed as his retirement match, when he defeated Sinn Bodhi at the Pro Wrestling Guerrilla (PWG) show during the WrestleReunion 5 weekend.

On May 18, 2013, Roberts returned to the ring for First State Championship Wrestling, a Delaware-based wrestling promotion, as part of an eight-man tag team main event. He teamed with Eric Chapel and CraziiWolf (Crazii Shea and Greywolf), defeating the team of Salvatore Sincere, Steve C Wrestling and Pretty Ugly (Jimmy Dream and Adam Ugly). On March 15, 2014, Roberts debuted in Regional Championship Wrestling's Rumblemania 9 in Reading, Pennsylvania as a surprise partner for Cliff Serenyi against Russian Mafia with Rich Rogers. This match ended in a DQ. Rogers was knocked out when Roberts stuck the snake in Roger's pants.

On June 14, 2014, Roberts participated in a six-man tag match in the main event for Reborn Wrestling (a Christian wrestling organization in Johnson City, Tennessee), teaming with The Stallion and Alex Cage to defeat E. Z. Money, Reborn Champion Cody Ices and Anthony Brody. On June 15, 2014, Roberts was an entrant in the CWF Hollywood Red Carpet Rumble which was won by Willie Mack. He wrestled his last ever match against IamThePROVIDER at BBOW No Limits Wrestling promotion on September 2, 2018.

=== Second return to WWE (2005) ===
Roberts made an appearance on March 14, 2005, on Raw, where he confronted Randy Orton, who was preparing to challenge The Undertaker at WrestleMania 21. Roberts warned Orton that facing The Undertaker, particularly at WrestleMania, could be a soul-altering experience; he then fell victim to Orton's "RKO," helping to fuel Orton's "Legend Killer" gimmick. He worked with the company to create a DVD retrospective of his career (the aforementioned Pick Your Poison DVD), which was released later that year.

=== Total Nonstop Action Wrestling (2006, 2008) ===
Roberts made an appearance on the October 19, 2006 episode of TNA Impact!. He announced he would referee the Monster's Ball match between Brother Runt, Abyss, Raven, and Samoa Joe at Bound for Glory. Roberts then gave a "mumbling" promo. After Roberts took his snake out of a bag, Brother Runt told him to put it away. Roberts performed a DDT on Runt instead. At Bound for Glory, he performed a DDT on Raven, which helped Samoa Joe win the match. After the match, Roberts placed his snake on Raven.

Roberts made a one-night return to TNA in 2008 as a guest of "Black Machismo" Jay Lethal and SoCal Val's storyline wedding at Slammiversary.

=== Third return to WWE (2014–present) ===
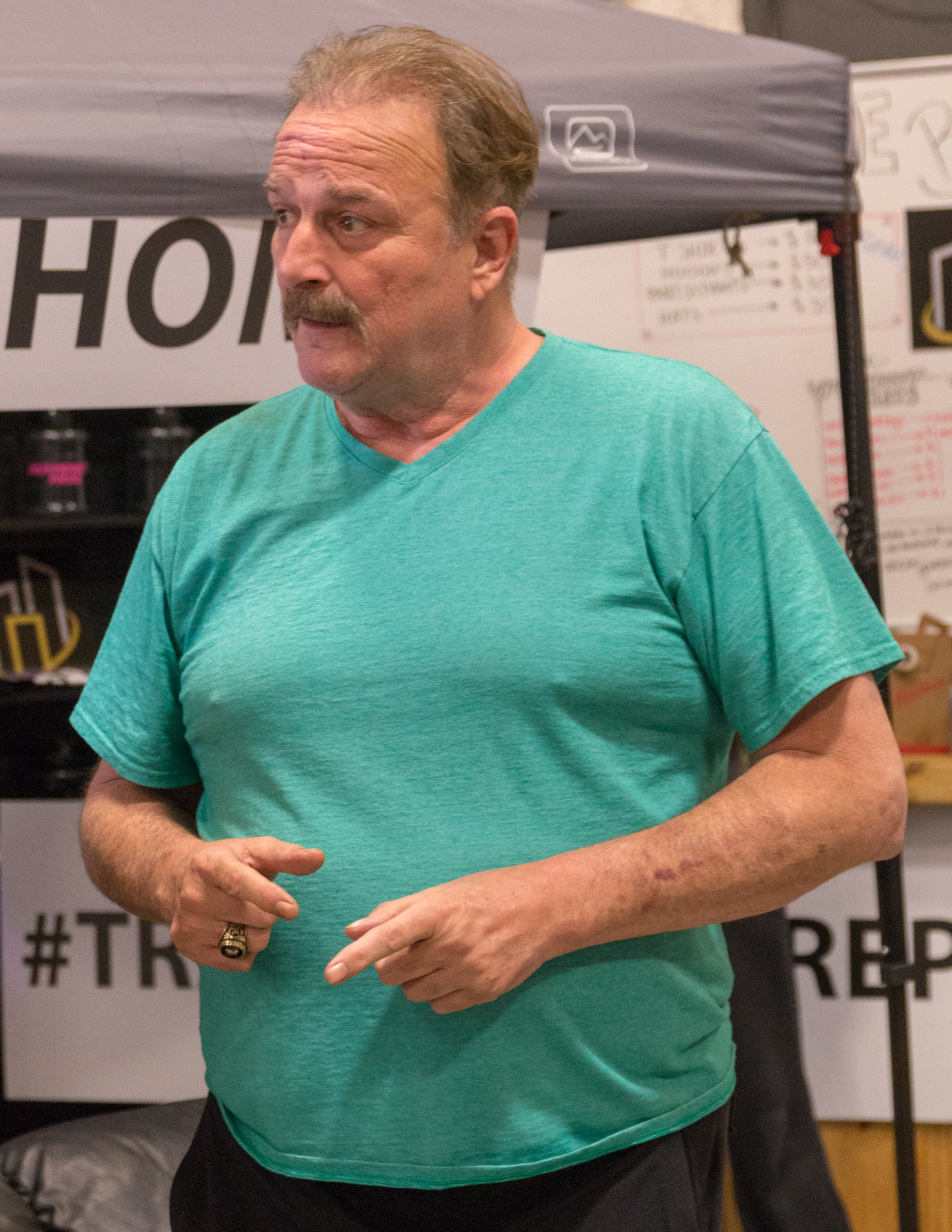
Roberts talking at a wrestling seminar in 2016

In 2013, Roberts announced his desire to return to WWE as a participant in the 2014 Royal Rumble.

On January 6, 2014, Roberts made an appearance on the "Old School" episode of Raw, laying a python over the face of an unconscious Dean Ambrose. Roberts was announced as part of the 2014 Class of the WWE Hall of Fame. He was inducted by Diamond Dallas Page on April 5, 2014. Regarding his Hall of Fame induction, he later said, "It wasn't at all what I expected... it was more about healing between a man and his family." After his induction Roberts signed a legends deal with WWE, allowing him to appear on WWE programming and video games, and would also be a regular on WWE Story Time, even making an appearance on the show after his AEW debut. In November 2026, Roberts announced that he was no longer under contract with WWE but would remain involved with the company in a limited capacity for autograph signings and Topps trading cards.

=== All Elite Wrestling (2019–2026) ===
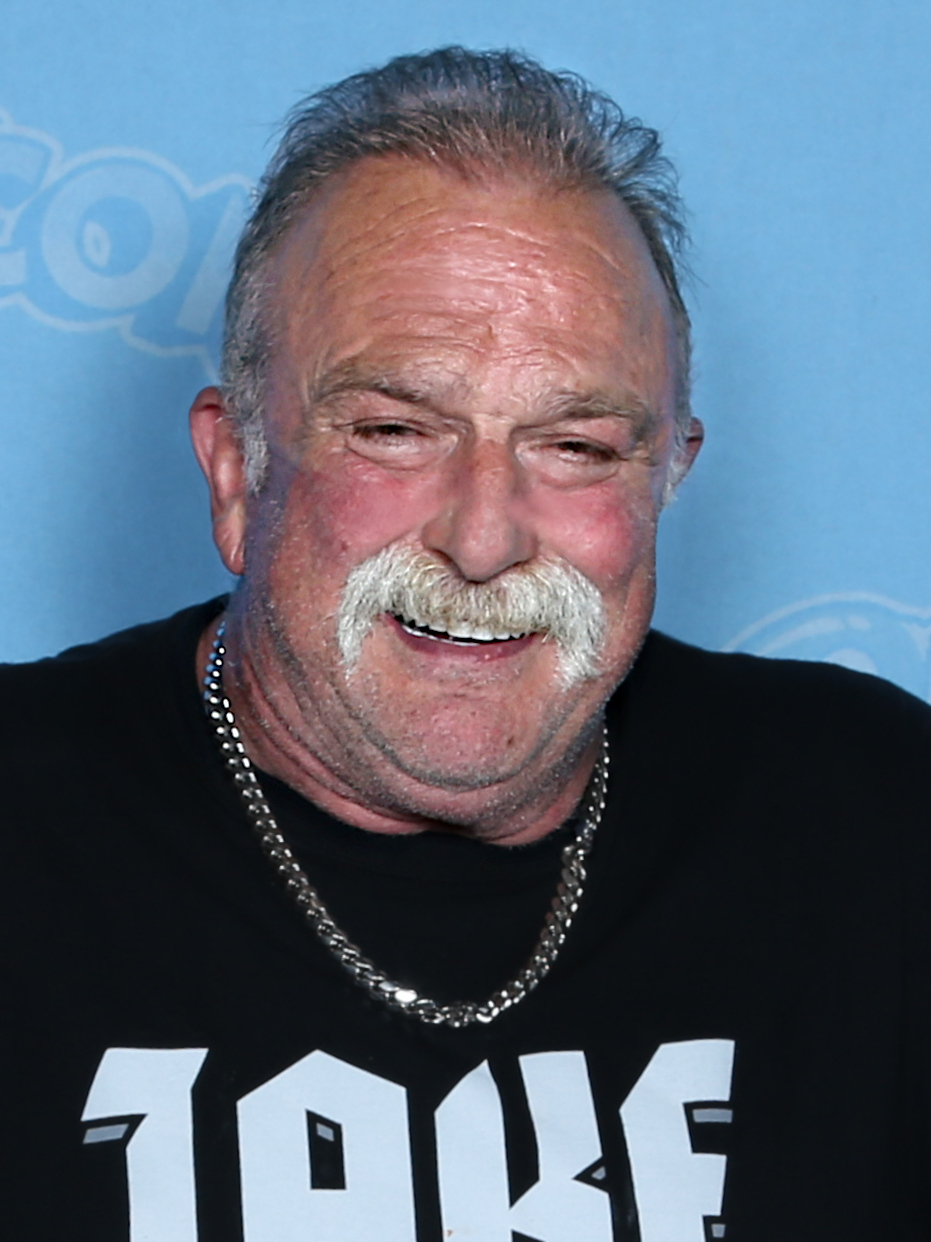
Jake Roberts in 2022 GalaxyCon

In 2019 during The Road to All Out, Roberts appeared as a dealer at a blackjack table dealing cards to Women's Casino Battle Royale participants, referring to his infamous "you wanna play 21?" promo from 1999. On March 4, 2020, he made a surprise appearance on AEW Dynamite, interrupting Cody and warning him that he had a "client" incoming to AEW to bring him down. On March 11, 2020, Roberts revealed Lance Archer as his new client. Roberts would manage Archer during the tournament for the AEW TNT Championship, where Archer was able to make it to the finals at Double or Nothing on May 23, 2020, before losing to Cody Rhodes after Mike Tyson prevented Roberts from interfering on Archer's behalf. In July 2021, Roberts announced he had signed a 2-year contract extension with AEW. Roberts would continue to sporadically appear with Archer throughout 2022 and 2023.

On February 1, 2023, it was announced that Roberts, along with Mark Henry, Paul Wight, and Shawn Dean was named a special advisor in AEW's community outreach program, titled AEW Together. In a press release, their roles were explained as "they will bring their experience and passion for community relations to help identify partner organizations across the country, assist in incorporating talent participation and provide counsel on enhancing activations."

On the October 8, 2024 episode of Dynamite, Roberts acquired La Facción Ingobernable or LFI (Rush, Dralístico, and The Beast Mortos) from Don Callis in exchange for Lance Archer. Roberts would manage the group until the November 16, 2024 episode of Collision, before being taken off television. In February 2025, LFI returned without Roberts. In July 2026, Roberts confirmed that he was no longer under contract with AEW.

== Professional wrestling persona ==
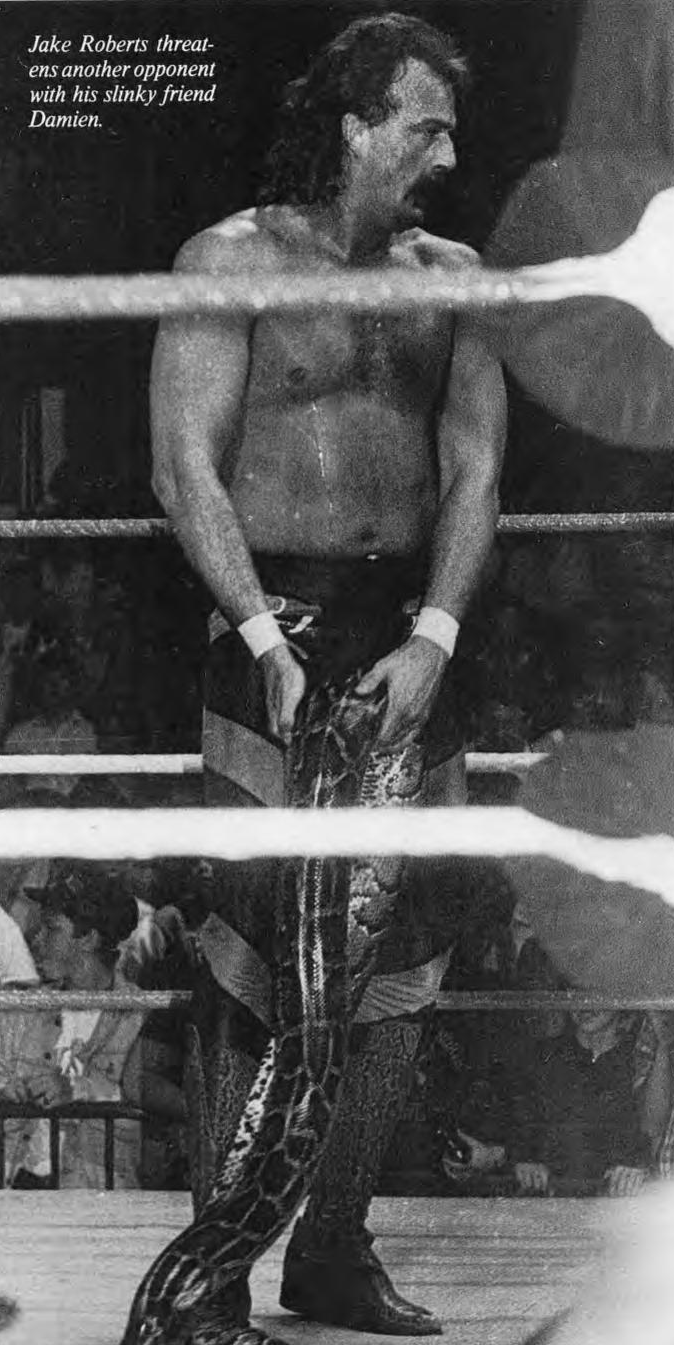
Roberts with his snake, Damien, circa 1986

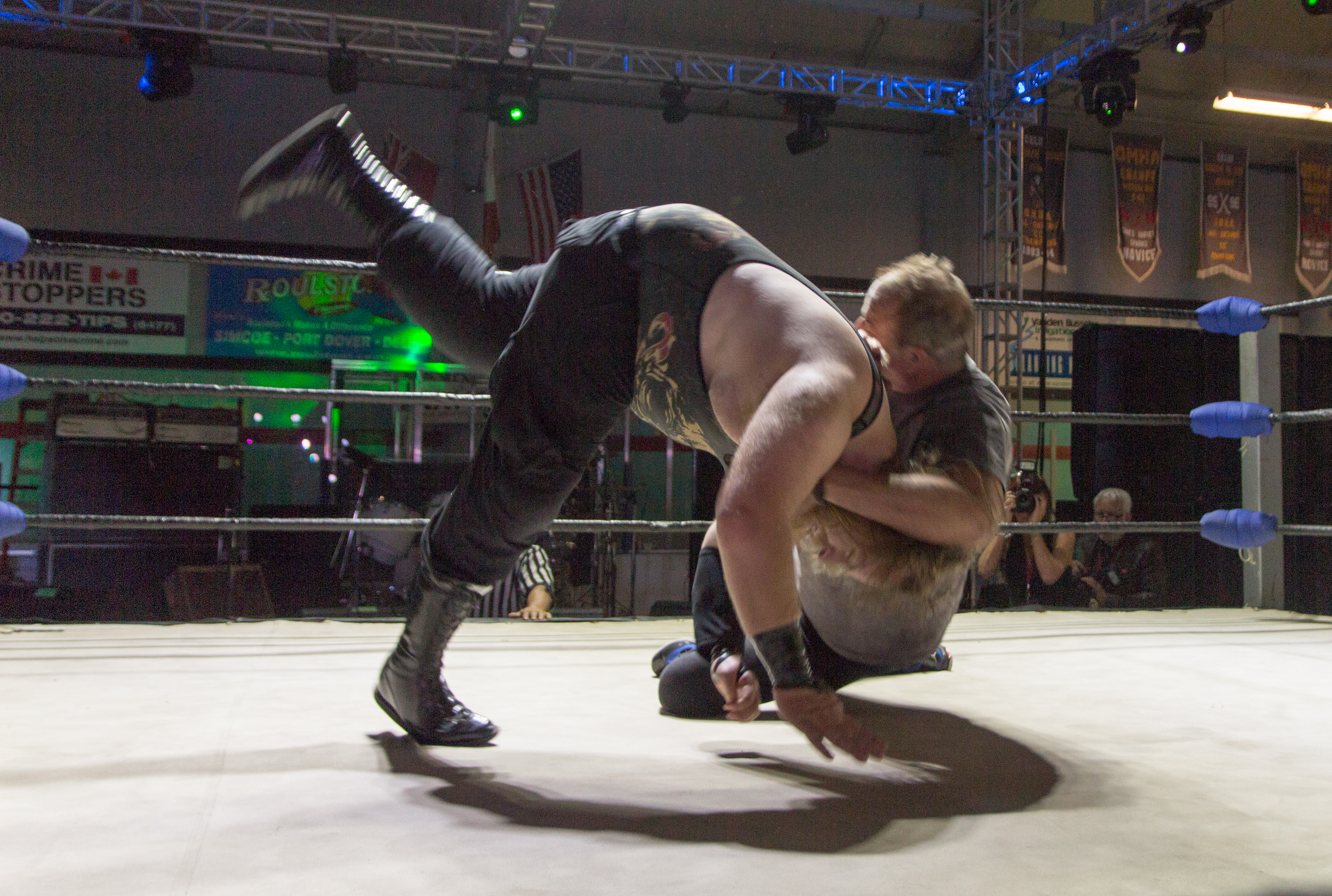
Roberts performing the DDT on John Greed, a move he is credited for inventing by WWE

Roberts derived his nickname for seeming snake-like and untrustworthy. On the Pick Your Poison DVD, he claimed he got his nickname by copying Oakland Raiders quarterback Ken "The Snake" Stabler (of whom he was a fan). To accentuate this, he often slid ("slithered") into and out of the ring on his belly under the bottom rope. His ring name "Jake Roberts" was extrapolated from the initials of J. R. Ewing, the similarly backhanded character from the TV series Dallas. Once he reached the World Wrestling Federation (WWF) in March 1986, he would bring a Burmese python (most were named "Damien") to ringside in a canvas bag. Other types used were a reticulated python named Lucifer, an unnamed devenomized cobra, and an albino Burmese python named Revelations (during Roberts's Christian conversion gimmick in 1996). After executing a DDT for the pin, he would place a python on the opponent, to various reactions.

In later time, Roberts, who in real life was actually extremely paranoid of snakes, acknowledged that he actually came with the idea for the Snake gimmick during a time he was "shooting my mouth off" while stoned.

Roberts has been praised for his ring psychology. Jim Ross said he also stands out for his promo work. Ted DiBiase said he enjoyed working with Roberts, and Bad News Brown called him his second-best opponent. Randy Savage said he enjoyed his run with Roberts, whose work was impressive.

== Spoken word career ==
In 2018, Roberts embarked on his a series of spoken word shows dubbed The Dirty Details Tour, subtitled "Tales From The Pit". According to social media the tour was to feature "an uncensored night of comedy, stories from the road, Q&A and more". The tour kicked off on November 6, 2018, at the Lookout Lounge in Omaha, Nebraska.

== Other media ==
In the late 1980s, Roberts made a guest appearance on the DJ Kat Show on Fox, challenging DJ to a match after the Kat had badmouthed the profession.

In 1996, Roberts, Vader, and Brother Love appeared on the ABC sitcom Boy Meets World for one episode.

In 1999, Roberts was unflatteringly featured in the wrestling documentary Beyond the Mat. Throughout the film, he made confessions about his tragic past, including the murder of his sister by her husband's ex-wife and the collapse of his marriage. He was also shown enjoying the taste of a post match cigarette. Amongst the more disturbing moments was Roberts reportedly smoking crack in a hotel room after a reunion with his daughter Brandy, though the act is not shown on camera. In 2005, Roberts, along with others, heavily criticized the film for showing him in a negative light, complaining that the depiction of him was "not the real Jake Roberts." Roberts also stated that director Barry Blaustein and Terry Funk lied to him about the aims of the film, telling him it was a television special on the effects of drug and alcohol abuse.

From 2013 to 2015 Roberts voiced himself in 6 episodes of Lucas Bros. Moving Co.

Roberts was featured in another wrestling documentary in 2015 entitled The Resurrection of Jake the Snake, which chronicled his time living with Diamond Dallas Page beginning in October 2012.

Roberts appeared as Mr. Lucas, the owner of a gourmet condom company, in the comedy film, The Bet which also featured Dallas Page and Roddy Piper. In 2018 he lent his voice to the horror film Parts Unknown.

Roberts also made an appearance in An Almost True Story: TOXIC TUTU in 2015, as himself, in a scene with Jonny Fairplay from Survivor.

Roberts has a role in the 2019 film The Peanut Butter Falcon. That same year Roberts also voiced the Dart Playing Thug in two episodes of Rapunzel's Tangled Adventure. He played Remy in the 2022 drama thriller Out of Exile.

On May 30, 2021, he was on an episode of WWE's Most Wanted Treasures.

On January 4, 2022, Roberts launched a podcast with Diamond Dallas Page and Conrad Thompson titled DDP Snakepit.

On February 26, 2023, Roberts was the subject of the Biography: WWE Legends.

In July 2024 Roberts played Vance in The Skies Are Watching, an audio sci-fi thriller for BBC Radio 4 and Tribeca Audio. In 2025 Roberts and the rest of the cast won an Ambie award for Best Performance in Audio Fiction.

=== Video games ===
Year	Game	Notes
1987	MicroLeague Wrestling	Video game debut
1991	WWF WrestleFest	
1992	WWF Super WrestleMania	Cover athlete
1992	WWF Superstars 2	
1992	WWF WrestleMania: Steel Cage Challenge	
2004	Showdown: Legends of Wrestling	Cover athlete
2005	WWE SmackDown! vs. Raw 2006	
2009	WWE Legends of WrestleMania	
2010	WWE SmackDown vs. Raw 2011	
2011	WWE All Stars	
2013	WWE 2k14	DLC
2014	WWE SuperCard	Mobile game
2015	WWE 2k16	
2016	WWE 2k17	
2017	WWE 2k18	
2018	WWE 2k19	
2020	WWE 2k20	
2020	WWE 2K Battlegrounds	
2022	WWE 2k22	
2023	WWE 2k23	
2024	WWE 2k24	
2025	WWE 2k25	

== Personal life ==
Roberts is the son of wrestler Grizzly Smith. From Smith, he has two half-siblings whom are also wrestlers, Sam Houston and Rockin' Robin.

Roberts has been married three times. In 2023, Roberts resumed his romantic relationship with his ex-wife Cheryl.

Although snakes were a major part of his wrestling persona, Roberts has openly acknowledged a lifelong fear of snakes. According to Roberts, his aversion to snakes originated in his youth as venomous snakes are common in his Texas homeland. Roberts has further stated that the stress and paranoia triggered from working with snakes was a major contributor to his drug and alcohol abuse.

=== Health ===
Roberts is known for his raspy, whispery voice. He revealed in 2023 that it was the product of an accident in the ring involving a fight with former Olympian Bob Roop in 1975, in which he dropped a knee on Roberts' throat and accidentally crushed his voice box. The injury led to Roberts speaking in a lower register.

In 2007, WWE started a policy of paying all expenses for its former performers who wanted to start drug rehabilitation programs. Roberts was placed in a 14-week voluntary rehab program by WWE in December 2007. In May 2008, Jim Ross reported that Roberts "has been doing well the past few weeks, after completing a treatment program".

In October 2012, while financially distressed and having resumed abusing alcohol and drugs, Roberts moved in with former wrestler Diamond Dallas Page in Atlanta, Georgia. This event was chronicled in the documentary The Resurrection of Jake the Snake. His weight had ballooned to over 300 lb (136 kg) and he was having trouble doing simple tasks such as walking without becoming short of breath. During filming, Roberts had shoulder surgery which was financed through crowdfunding. After 18 months, he had lost over 50 lb (22 kg) and improved his mobility attributed in part to Page's yoga program.

In February 2014, TMZ reported that Roberts had muscular cancer below his knee and was scheduled for surgery. In a response to the article, Roberts was quoted as saying, "If the devil can't defeat me, cancer doesn't stand a chance in hell! Pray for sick children who face this horrible disease 'cause The Snake will be just fine." In July 2014, he announced that he was cancer-free after various surgeries.

In August 2014, Roberts fell ill during a flight from Atlanta to Las Vegas, where he was scheduled to attend a birthday event for fellow wrestler Nick Cvjetkovich. First reports indicated that Roberts had fallen unconscious, but his manager/lawyer, Kyle P. Magee, confirmed that Roberts was alert and awake during the flight and notified the flight attendant of his pain and shortness of breath. Magee said Roberts was medically induced to a "coma-like" state in order to treat pneumonia. He was diagnosed with the flu two weeks earlier and ignored doctors' advice of rest and continued to travel to events. Upon arrival at the ICU in Las Vegas, he was diagnosed with double pneumonia. Doctors also found an abnormality on his brain which they felt could be a result of all the bumps Roberts took over his long career.

In November 2020, Roberts was taken to the hospital after feeling breathless during a long period of persistent coughing. After several days, he was diagnosed with chronic obstructive pulmonary disease. He missed AEW tapings on December 16 and 17, citing this illness.

In May 2025, Roberts would have heart ablation surgery.

=== Legal issues ===
In June 2001, Roberts was involved in a parking lot collision in Girard, Ohio (near Niles), while in the area for an autograph appearance. His Lincoln Continental hit another car; he left the scene, was stopped by police, and charged with DUI (reported BAC 0.179), leaving the scene of an accident, and related offenses. He later pleaded guilty, received probation, and was ordered into alcohol treatment.

In 2004, during his stay in Britain, Roberts was convicted of causing unnecessary suffering to a Burmese python that had been used in his wrestling act. Reports from the time stated that the snake was severely underfed, suffered from health problems including mouth rot, and later died after being seized by animal welfare authorities.

== Championships and accomplishments ==
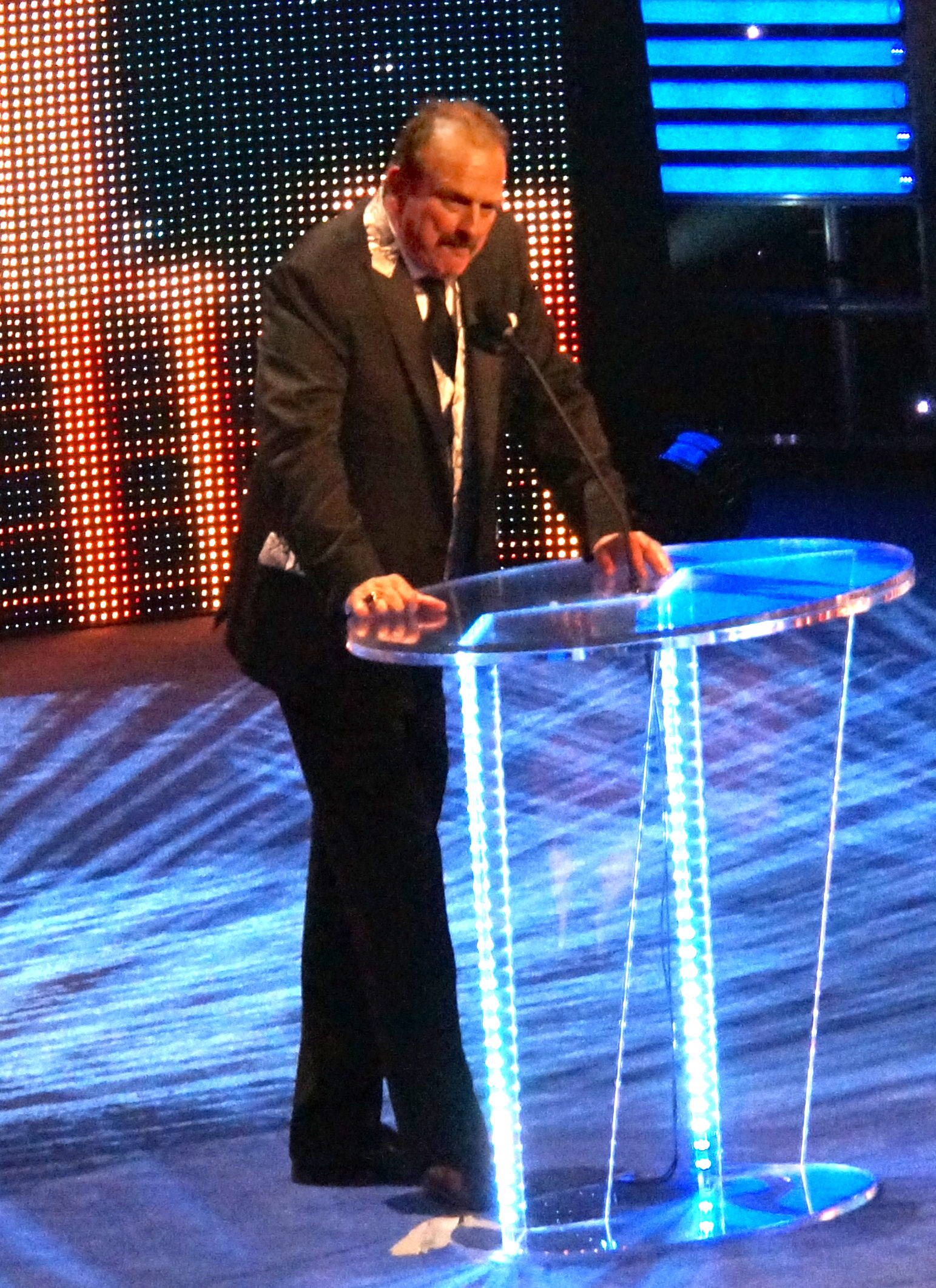
Roberts was inducted into the WWE Hall of Fame in 2014

- All-Star Wrestling Network (Georgia)
  - AWN World Heavyweight Championship (1 time)
- Americas Wrestling Federation (Puerto Rico)
  - AWF Puerto Rico Heavyweight Championship (1 time)
- Bad Boys of Wrestling
  - BBOW Heavyweight Championship (1 time)
- Cauliflower Alley Club
  - Men's Wrestling Award (2013)
- Georgia Championship Wrestling
  - NWA National Television Championship (1 time)
  - NWA World Television Championship (Georgia version) (2 times)
  - One Night Tournament (1984)
- Mid-South Wrestling Association
  - Mid-South Louisiana Heavyweight Championship (1 time)
  - Mid-South North American Heavyweight Championship (2 times)
  - Mid-South Television Championship (1 time)
  - Mid-South Television Championship Tournament (1986)
- Pro Wrestling Federation
  - PWF Tag Team Championship (1 time) - with Mike Blade
- Exodus Wrestling Alliance
  - EWA Heavyweight Championship (1 time)
- Pro Wrestling Illustrated
  - Inspirational Wrestler of the Year (1996)
  - Ranked No. 23 of the top 500 singles wrestlers in the PWI 500 in 1991
  - Ranked No. 100 of the top 500 singles wrestlers of the "PWI Years" in 2003
- Professional Wrestling Hall of Fame and Museum
  - Class of 2020
- Smoky Mountain Wrestling
  - SMW Heavyweight Championship (1 time)
- Stampede Wrestling
  - Stampede North American Heavyweight Championship (1 time)
- World Class Championship Wrestling
  - NWA World Six-Man Tag Team Championship (Texas version) (1 time) – with Chris Adams and Gino Hernandez
  - WCCW Television Championship (1 time)
- NWA:UK Hammerlock
  - NWA United Kingdom Heavyweight Championship (1 time)
- World Wrestling Alliance (Puerto Rico)
  - WWA Puerto Rico Heavyweight Championship (1 time)
- WWE
  - WWE Hall of Fame (Class of 2014)

== Luchas de Apuestas record ==
Winner (wager)	Loser (wager)	Location	Event	Date	Notes
Konnan (hair)	Jake Roberts (hair)	Tijuana, Baja California	Triplemanía II-C	May 27, 1994	

== Awards and nominations ==
Year	Award	Nominee / work	Category	Result
2025	Ambies	The Skies Are Watching	Best Performance in Audio Fiction (shared)	Won

== See also ==
- Animals in professional wrestling
