= The Resurrection of Jake the Snake =

- Theatrical release poster
- Directed by: Steve Yu
- Written by: Steve Yu
- Produced by: Chris Bell; Christopher Carey; Dallas Page; Steve Yu
- Cinematography: Louie Benson; Christopher Carey; Nick Leone; Nathan Mowery; Derek Scearce; Chris Staab; Steve Yu
- Edited by: Chris Carey; Dylan Frymyer; Nathan Mowery; Garett Sakahara; Steve Yu
- Production company: Comeback Studios
- Distributed by: Slamdance Presents
- Release dates: January 23, 2015 (Slamdance Film Festival); September 2, 2015 (United States)
- Running time: 93 minutes
- Country: United States
- Language: English

The Resurrection of Jake the Snake is a 2015 American documentary film directed by Steve Yu chronicling the life of professional wrestler Jake Roberts (also known by his ring name of Jake "The Snake" Roberts). In particular, the film focuses on Roberts' life from 2012 to 2014, during which time he undergoes a rehabilitation program led by his friend and former professional wrestler Diamond Dallas Page to break his alcoholism and improve his overall health. Numerous other wrestlers are interviewed about Roberts throughout the film, and Scott Hall (another professional wrestler and friend of Page and Roberts) joins the rehabilitation program several months after Roberts, having similarly struggled with alcoholism.

The film debuted at the Slamdance Film Festival on January 23, 2015 and experienced a limited theatrical run starting on September 2 of that year. The film has received generally mixed to positive reviews from critics.

== Plot ==
The film begins with an overview of the career of professional wrestler Jake Roberts, intercut with interviews from other professional wrestlers discussing his career. Starting from his successful career working as a top performer for the World Wrestling Federation in the 1980s (including performing at WrestleMania III in front of over 90,000 attendees), Roberts suffered from alcoholism and personal issues that caused his popularity and career to decline. At an independent wrestling show in 2008 (attended by 700 people), Jake is presumably drunk and disorderly during his match, struggling to last 30 seconds and becoming irritable towards the audience. The incident was covered by the online tabloid TMZ.

The film then jumps to August 2012, when professional wrestler Diamond Dallas Page (DDP, whom Roberts had mentored in the 1990s) travels to visit Roberts at his home in Gainesville, Texas. Roberts is out of shape, struggling with alcoholism, and reveals that he had used crack cocaine a month prior. In October of that year, at DDP's behest, Roberts moves into DDP's house in Atlanta (which he calls "the Accountability Crib"), where he starts a rehabilitation program led by DDP. Over the course of the program, there are several instances of relapse, but Roberts improves his physical health, develops a better relationship with his estranged family, and gradually breaks his alcoholism. Several months into the program, Roberts requires shoulder surgery to treat his shoulder impingement syndrome, and as he has no health insurance, they decide to raise the money needed through crowdfunding. They soon reached their goal of $9,200 within two days on Indiegogo. Fifteen weeks into Roberts' program, professional wrestler Scott Hall joined the Accountability Crib, as he had similarly been struggling with addiction and was physically out of shape.

Throughout the program, Roberts stays active by participating in fan meetings, podcasts, and other activities, and he is also inducted into the Cauliflower Alley Club. After 47 weeks, Roberts moves into a house next door to DDP and continues the program. Throughout the documentary, a goal of Roberts is to become healthy enough to compete in the 2014 Royal Rumble, and while he does not compete in the event, Roberts is invited onto a special "Old School" episode of WWE Raw, which was broadcast on January 6, 2014. Additionally, both Hall and Roberts are inducted into the 2014 WWE Hall of Fame, with DDP inducting Roberts. The movie ends with a short clip of DDP, Hall, and Roberts in a wrestling ring discussing their lives and the program and facing off in a lighthearted match as the credits roll.

== Wrestlers featured ==
In addition to DDP, Hall, and Roberts, who are the subject of the film, several other professional wrestlers and individuals who had worked with Roberts were interviewed for the film, including:

- Stone Cold Steve Austin
- Ted DiBiase
- Jim Duggan
- Edge
- Chris Jericho
- Jerry Mires
- Gene Okerlund
- Dustin Rhodes
- Jim Ross

== Release ==
The film debuted at the 2015 Slamdance Film Festival. Following this, the film became the first to be distributed under Slamdance Presents, the newly created distribution arm of the film festival. The film began its nationwide release on September 2, 2015 with a premiere at the Portland Film Festival in Portland, Oregon. This was followed by releases in several major cities across the United States.

== Reception ==
The film received generally mixed to positive reviews from critics. In a review for Vice, Ian Williams wrote, "The Resurrection of Jake the Snake is currently garnering a bit of Oscar buzz, primarily by dint of it not being rejected out of hand by the Academy upon its submission. That reads snarky, but it's not. That mere consideration is an achievement in its own right, and while Resurrection doesn't quite achieve the heights of the great pro wrestling films in history—its moments of greatness come almost despite themselves—there is some greatness in it." A review in The Hollywood Reporter praised the raw emotional moments captured in the documentary, but stated that the film (Yu's directorial debut) was "a bit rough around the edges". Additional positive reviews were given by Den of Geek, IndieWire, and FilmInk. Multiple reviews noted the similarity between the film and Beyond the Mat, a 1999 wrestling documentary that featured Roberts.

Robert Abele of the Los Angeles Times, however, gave the film a negative review, calling it "voyeuristic" and "ragged and routine". He also accused the filmmakers of self-promotion instead of objective filmmaking and ended his review by stating, "Though the central story is built to inspire, and surely will for the many followers of wrestling who love a comeback (and know the ending given away by the title), the whole enterprise smacks of a pilot for something that might be called "Celebrity Wrestler Rehab."" Another criticism of the film pertained to its portrayal of DDP Yoga, a yoga course created by DDP that features heavily in the documentary as part of Roberts' recovery. In the same review for Vice, Williams criticized the fact that Yu is the current president of DDP Yoga and was possibly president at the time of the filming. While he states that Yu was personally concerned about this and tried to avoid excessive branding in the film, Williams called it a "touch sketchy". Additionally, Jon Jackson in Den of Geek stated, "At times, the film feels a little like an advertisement for 'DDP Yoga.’"
