= Diamond Dallas Page =

American professional wrestler, actor, and fitness instructor

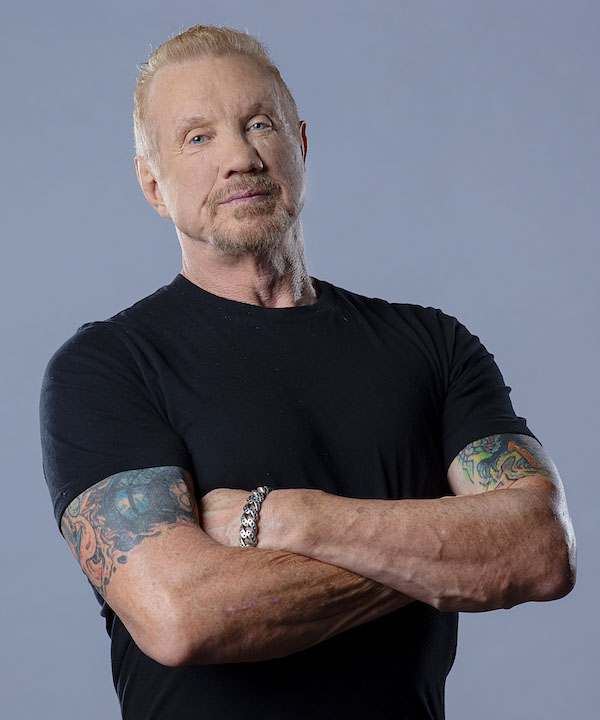
- Page in 2016
- Born: Page Joseph Falkinburg Jr. April 5, 1956 (age 70); Point Pleasant, New Jersey, U.S.
- Occupations: Professional wrestler; actor; wrestling manager; fitness instructor
- Years active: 1979 (wrestler); 1988–1991 (wrestling manager); 1989–2020 (wrestler); 1999–present (actor); 2012–present (fitness instructor)
- Spouses: Kimberly Page (m. 1991; div. 2005); Brenda Nair (m. 2015; div. 2020); Payge McMahon (m. 2021)
- Children: 2
- Professional wrestling career
- Website: diamonddallaspage.com
- Ring name: Diamond Dallas Page (DDP)
- Billed height: 6 ft 5 in (196 cm)
- Billed weight: 248 lb (112 kg)}
- Billed from: The Jersey Shore
- Trained by: Jake Roberts; WCW Power Plant
- Debut: 1979
- Retired: January 15, 2020

Dallas Page (born Page Joseph Falkinburg Jr., April 5, 1956), is an American fitness instructor, actor, and retired professional wrestler. He is currently signed to WWE under a Legends contract, under the ring name Diamond Dallas Page (often shortened to DDP). In the course of his wrestling career Page has wrestled for mainstream wrestling promotions World Championship Wrestling (WCW), the World Wrestling Federation (WWF, now WWE), Total Nonstop Action Wrestling (TNA), and All Elite Wrestling (AEW).

Page first broke into the wrestling business in 1979, in which he wrestled three matches. He retired after a knee injury but he returned to wrestling as a manager in the American Wrestling Association in 1988, where he worked for nine months. He served as a manager with WCW starting in 1991 but became a wrestler late in that same year. Over a decade in WCW, Page became a three-time WCW World Heavyweight Champion, two-time WCW United States Heavyweight Champion, four-time WCW World Tag Team Champion and one-time WCW World Television Champion. He is the fourth WCW Triple Crown Champion, and the only United States Heavyweight Champion to defend the title in a pay-per-view main event, defeating Bret Hart at the 1998 World War 3.

After WCW was sold in 2001, Page signed with the WWF where he made his pay-per-view debut in the main event of July's Invasion show, and went on to become a one-time WWF European Champion and one-time WWF World Tag Team Champion. Due to a series of injuries, he allowed his contract with the company to expire in 2002. He worked for TNA from 2004 to 2005, challenging for the NWA World Heavyweight Championship in the main event of Destination X 2005. On March 31, 2017, he was inducted into the WWE Hall of Fame by Eric Bischoff. He is considered "one of the finest WCW legends in history."

Since 2012, Page has run a mail order and online fitness video business called DDP Yoga, based on yoga and dynamic self-resistance.

== Early life ==
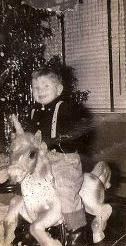
Falkinburg as a child

Page Joseph Falkinburg Jr., the eldest of three children, was born in Point Pleasant, New Jersey, the son of Sylvia (née Seigel) and Page Falkinburg Sr. He was raised by his father during his early years after his parents divorced. He stated that he is of German, Irish, and Dutch origin. Falkinburg/Falkenburg is also the name of multiple German villages and at least three German castles. The name "Dallas" came from his love of the Dallas Cowboys.

His brother Rory and sister Sally were raised by their maternal grandmother. Falkinburg lived with his father from age three to eight. His father took him, at eight years old, to live with his grandmother, who raised him. Falkinburg admitted in his autobiography he is dyslexic. He had many challenges hit him throughout his childhood and educational years.

He attended St. Joseph's High School (now Donovan Catholic High School) in Toms River, New Jersey, for his freshman and second years, spending his first season on the JV basketball team and making the varsity squad as a sophomore. He transferred to Point Pleasant Borough High School in Point Pleasant, New Jersey, where he was a star basketball player with the Panthers. He attended Coastal Carolina University in Conway, South Carolina briefly before leaving school to work full-time.

== Professional wrestling career ==
=== Early career (1979) ===
In 1979, Page wrestled in three matches in the Canadian Maritimes. He retired after a knee injury.

=== American Wrestling Association (1988) ===
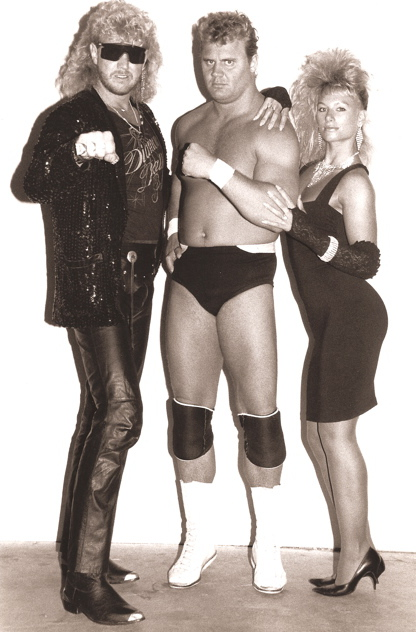
DDP, Curt Hennig and Diamond Doll Tonya in 1988

Page ran a nightclub in Fort Myers, Florida called Norma Jeans (known for its pink Cadillac) while he was working as a wrestling manager in the American Wrestling Association (AWA). He started managing in 1988, where he handled Badd Company (Paul Diamond and Pat Tanaka), a team he led to the AWA World Tag Team Championship on March 19. Badd Company was often accompanied by female valets known as the "Diamond Dolls" (Tonya, Jennifer and Torri). During his time in the AWA, Page also managed Colonel DeBeers, Curt Hennig and Madusa Miceli as the leader of the Diamond Exchange stable. He worked for the AWA at 12 dates over a period of nine months, where they filmed all the television shows in one day.

=== Professional Wrestling Federation (1989–1991) ===
Page also worked as a color commentator in Florida Championship Wrestling (FCW), soon renamed Professional Wrestling Federation (PWF), where he worked alongside Gordon Solie, before finally debuting as a professional wrestler. Page's first pro match occurred in May 1989 against Dick Slater.

In 1990, Page received a tryout with the WWF as an announcer, but wasn't offered a job. At WrestleMania VI, he drove Rhythm and Blues (The Honky Tonk Man and Greg Valentine) to the ring in his pink Cadillac. At this time, he was virtually unknown in the World Wrestling Federation. When FCW went out of business, Page was still involved in the club business until Dusty Rhodes returned to World Championship Wrestling. Rhodes started booking and brought him in on a small contract in early 1991.

=== World Championship Wrestling/WCW (1991–2001) ===
==== Various alliances (1991–1993) ====
Page made his way to World Championship Wrestling (WCW) in January 1991, becoming the manager of The Fabulous Freebirds (Jimmy Garvin and Michael P.S. Hayes). He made his debut on the February 3, 1991 edition of The Main Event, where Paul E. Dangerously introduced Page to the audience in an interview on the show's wrestling news segment The Danger Zone. Page managed the Freebirds to a shot at the NWA World Tag Team Championship where they defeated Doom (Butch Reed and Ron Simmons) on February 24. Before that match took place, Page unveiled the stable's new road manager, Big Daddy Dink, formerly known as Oliver Humperdink, who interfered in the match. During this match, Page introduced the Diamond Dolls. In April 1991 he added Scott Hall to the stable under the name of Diamond Studd. Page also worked as a color commentator for WCW with Eric Bischoff. With rumors that the WCW wanted to take the Diamond Studd away from Page, he decided to take the advice of Magnum T. A. and begin to wrestle himself. He headed to the WCW Power Plant where Buddy Lee Parker, The Assassin, and Dusty Rhodes trained the 35-year-old rookie. The advice was fruitful, as on the August 31, 1991 episode it was announced by commentators that the Studd and Page had indeed parted ways.

Dallas Page would make his debut as a wrestler on August 22, 1991, at a house show in Jacksonville, FL, losing to Tom Zenk in 90 seconds. As he continued his training, Page became a commentator for WCW programming. He also resumed managing Scott Hall; however, he would not return to the ring until November 25, 1991, when he teamed with The Diamond Studd to defeat Chris Sullivan and Brian Lee on WCW World Championship Wrestling (the future WCW Saturday Night). At the same taping, but in a match that aired on the December 21 WCW Pro, Studd and Page would gain their first significant victory when they defeated PN News and Johnny B. Badd. On the house show circuit, Page and Studd suffered their first defeat when they fell to the WCW Patriots in Baltimore, Maryland on November 27. On the December 21 edition of "World Championship Wrestling", Dallas accomplished his first single victory, defeating Johnny Rich. Later that month he faced former clients Michael Hayes and Jim Garvin in house show matches, losing each encounter.

He made his wrestling pay-per-view debut at the 1991 Starrcade on December 29, teaming with Mike Graham in a losing effort to Jushin Thunder Liger and Bill Kazmaier. In regards to this period, he stated: "Bischoff gave me the job as I was a good example of work ethic, passion and someone that cares about the business. Since they wouldn't really book me, I went down to the WCW Power Plant every day I wasn't working. That's how you adapt to adversity. Even when I started to make it, I still kept going back. Until I was on the road 260 days a year-plus, I was still going to that Power Plant. For five years I went there, because that's how long it took me to get to the top."

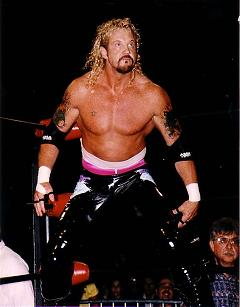
Page in the ring

Page opened 1992 with a house show victory over Brad Anderson in Atlanta, Georgia, making his wrestling debut at The Omni. This would be his only victory for some time, as the former manager began to wrestle full-time but quickly found himself relegated to the "jobber" list. Page would make his debut at Clash of the Champions, losing to PN News at Clash of the Champions XVIII. He would also lose matches to Ron Simmons, The Steiner Brothers, Barry Windham & Dustin Rhodes, Van Hammer, The Freebirds, Nikita Koloff and Tom Zenk. On February 29, 1992, he was defeated by Big Josh in the opening dark match at the SuperBrawl II PPV.

In April 1992 he began teaming with Richard Morton (Ricky Morton) following the dissolution of The York Foundation. The duo faced Ron Simmons & The Junkyard Dog, The Steiner Brothers and The Freebirds on the house show circuit but were unsuccessful. On the April 25, 1992 episode of WCW Worldwide it was announced that WCW President Kip Frey had banned Page from any non-wrestling appearances in WCW, and ultimately eliminated his wrestling license. Meanwhile, on April 30, 1992, he garnered his first significant singles victory of his nascent career when he pinned Marcus Alexander Bagwell at a house show in West Palm Beach, Florida.

World Championship Wrestling announced a tournament to crown the NWA World Tag Team Champions on May 2, 1992; Dallas Page proceeded to crash the event and brought bags of letters of support for overturning his ban. Kip Frey relented, and Page had his TV time and wrestling license reinstated. He teamed with Thomas Rich to defeat Firebreaker Chip and Bob Cook in the dark match of WrestleWar '92 on May 17, 1992. On the June 13, 1992 edition of WCW Saturday Night, he faced WCW World Heavyweight Champion Sting in a non-title matchup and was defeated. On June 20, he teamed with Tracy Smothers and Richard Morton in a losing effort to The Junkyard Dog, Tom Zenk, and Big Josh in the dark match of Beach Blast 92.

Page continued to wrestle and gradually brought other wrestlers into his stable, The Diamond Mine, such as Scotty Flamingo (the future Raven) and Vinnie Vegas (Kevin Nash). The relationships between DDP, Flamingo, and Vegas were used in many angles over the following months. Page went in the corner of Scotty Flamingo, at Clash of the Champions XXI on November 18, 1992, when Flamingo fought Johnny B. Badd in a worked boxing match. Flamingo won this bout with a little help from Page who filled Flamingo's glove with water. The following year, after Studd and Flamingo left the stable, Page teamed with Vinnie Vegas as the Vegas Connection. The team was disbanded shortly after its debut when Page tore a rotator cuff in a match against Tex Slazenger and Shanghai Pierce toward the end of 1992 and was later cut from the company by new WCW president Bill Watts, while Nash left WCW for the World Wrestling Federation.

==== World Television Champion and feud with Randy Savage (1993–1997) ====
Page, determined to continue improving his character and in-ring skills, sought the help of Jake Roberts who advised him on the psychological aspects of the business. After his injury had healed and following a tour of Germany for World Wrestling Superstars in the summer of 1993, Page was re-hired by World Championship Wrestling. He made his return on the December 19, 1993 edition of The Main Event, losing to Scott D'Amore via countout. He closed the year by defeating "Jungle" Jim Steele at a house show in Kennesaw, GA

Page had returned with his wife Kimberly as the Diamond Doll, and an on-screen bodyguard, Max Muscle. He held open arm wrestling challenges to win Kimberly, but Max always helped him win or arm wrestled for him. He was also involved in an angle where he was said to have amassed $13 million through victories in arm wrestling competitions, then lost it. In summer 1995, he feuded with Dave Sullivan because Sullivan gave Kimberly gifts (and largely because Page was defeated by Sullivan in one of the arm wrestling contests, which earned him a date with Kimberly). At Fall Brawl, Page won his first championship when he defeated Renegade for the WCW World Television Championship. In the build-up to his first title defense at Halloween Havoc, there was growing dissension between Page and Kimberly. Johnny B. Badd defeated Page for the TV title and again at World War 3 on November 26, winning Kimberly's freedom from DDP. At Uncensored on March 24, 1996 The Booty Man with Kimberly as The Booty Babe defeated Diamond Dallas Page in a Loser Leaves Town match.

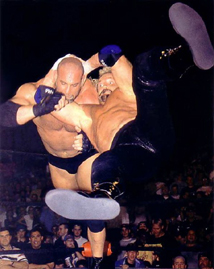
Page performs the Diamond Cutter on Goldberg

Page returned on the May 18, 1996 episode of WCW Saturday Night as a tweener, defeating Billy Kidman. On May 19, Page participated in the Lord of the Ring Tournament (Battle Bowl) at Slamboree. Page was victorious when he defeated The Barbarian with two Diamond Cutters. The winner was to be the number one contender for the WCW World Heavyweight Championship, which at that time was held by The Giant. He would never receive that title shot. Page was feuding with Eddie Guerrero when the New World Order (nWo) was formed. The nWo courted Page for a short period of time leading up to them askin him to join. He responded by giving Hall Diamond Cutter on an episode of Monday Nitro. This began a face turn and a feud with the nWo. Soon after, Page began a feud with recent nWo recruit "Macho Man" Randy Savage. On an episode of Nitro, Savage, aided by Scott Hall and Kevin Nash, attacked Page and spray-painted "nWo" on his back. A few weeks later at Uncensored, Savage and Miss Elizabeth "broke" (a worked shoot) by revealing to the world that Page and Kimberly were, in fact, married. Savage then proceeded to beat up Page, ensuring a future match between the two. At Spring Stampede, in Page's first pay-per-view main event, he and Savage battled in a match where Page emerged victorious, but it was not the end of conflict between the two. A few months later at The Great American Bash, they squared off again in an anything goes, lights out match. The match ended with Savage defeating Page with help from (then) Tag Team Champion Scott Hall. At Bash at the Beach, Scott Hall and Randy Savage defeated Diamond Dallas Page and Curt Hennig. Curt Hennig, who Diamond Dallas Page had recruited personally to join WCW and team with him, turned on DDP during the match. Hennig defeated Diamond Dallas Page in a grudge match at Road Wild. At Fall Brawl, Page teamed with Lex Luger to defeat Scott Hall and Randy Savage in a No Disqualification match. Page even dressed up as masked wrestler La Parka and beat Savage on the July 7 edition of Monday Nitro. Around this time, Page also started fighting nWo leader, Hollywood Hogan. Page and Savage battled for the last time at Halloween Havoc. The match was billed as a Las Vegas sudden-death match, where Savage pinned Page after Hogan, dressed as Sting, came out and hit Page with a baseball bat in his already "injured" midsection, resulting in Savage picking up the win. On an episode of Nitro shortly after Halloween Havoc, Page fought Hogan, but was again beaten down by the nWo.

==== United States Heavyweight Champion (1997–1998) ====
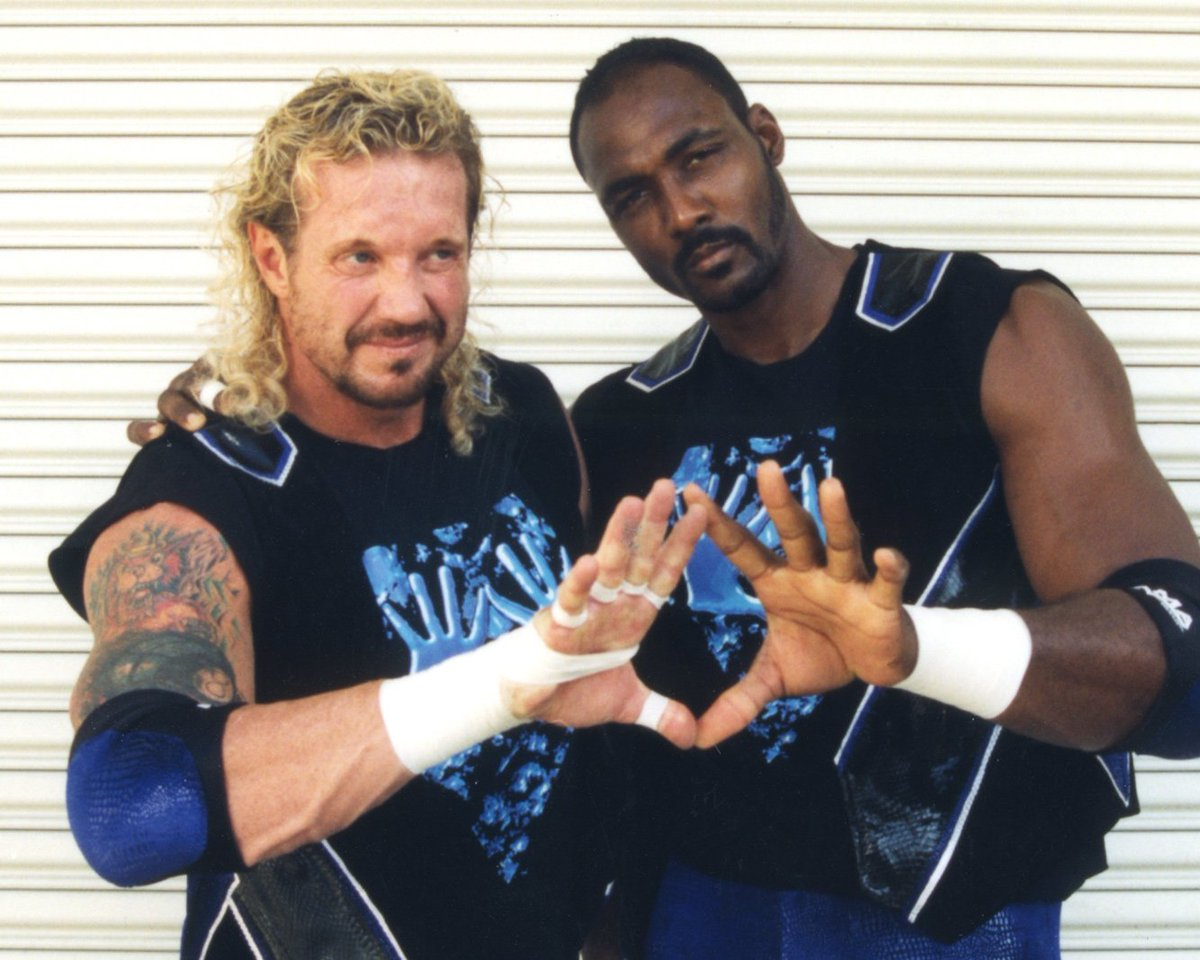
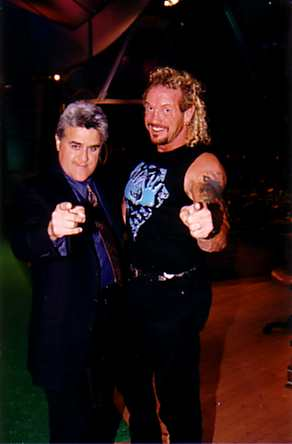
In 1998, Page tagged with Karl Malone (above) and Jay Leno at two different pay-per-views.

At Starrcade, Page won the United States Heavyweight Championship from Curt Hennig. The following year at Uncensored, Page defended the title in a Triple Threat, Falls Count Anywhere contest against Chris Benoit and Raven, putting Raven through a table with a Diamond Cutter to retain the belt. Page later lost the title to Raven at Spring Stampede.

Later in the year, Page resumed his feud with the NWO and began feuding with Hollywood Hogan. Since Hogan aligned himself with NBA star Dennis Rodman, Page aligned with Karl Malone (a huge wrestling fan and close friend of Page). Page requested to Eric Bischoff that he and Malone should wrestle Hogan and Rodman and Bischoff liked the idea. Page and Malone would lose to Hogan and Rodman (mostly because the Utah Jazz lost to the Chicago Bulls in the NBA Finals that year) at Bash at the Beach. Page was then paired with Jay Leno (another huge wrestling fan) and they beat Hogan and Bischoff at Road Wild.

Page, along with Raven and the Flock, were featured in the music video for the song Rising by the band Stuck Mojo. At Fall Brawl, Page won the WarGames main event, and got a World title shot against the undefeated Goldberg at Halloween Havoc. Page did not win the match, but the match was voted WCW Magazine's "Match of the Year" 1998. Halloween Havoc ran slightly longer than expected resulting in a number of cable companies blacking out the end of the Hogan versus Warrior match and all of the DDP versus Goldberg contest. WCW decided to air the Goldberg versus DDP title bout in its entirety on the October 26 episode of Nitro, which proved immensely popular in the ratings and resulted in a ratings win for Nitro over Raw – the last win Nitro ever had. Despite this setback in the World title picture, Page rebounded this same following night of Halloween Havoc, on the October 26 episode of Nitro, with a win over Bret Hart to capture the United States Heavyweight Title. The two headlined the following month's World War 3, in a title match which Page won. Page lost the title to Hart on the November 30 episode of Nitro in a No Disqualification match, when he was assaulted by The Giant.

==== WCW World Heavyweight Champion (1999–2001) ====
Page became WCW World Heavyweight Champion in April 1999, at Spring Stampede when he defeated Sting, Hogan, and Ric Flair for the title in a Four Way Dance with "Macho Man" Randy Savage as Special Guest Referee. Page pinned Flair after giving Flair the Diamond Cutter. Around this time some fans were starting to boo Page at various WCW events, so shortly after Spring Stampede a decision was made to turn Page heel for the first time in three years. The turn played out slowly at first, with Page undergoing a change in attitude. Then, on April 19, Page defended his title against Goldberg, where he cemented the turn by first knocking Goldberg out with brass knuckles and then propping his leg up against the ring stairs and repeatedly smashing it with a steel chair, all while taunting the fans with repeated utterances of "boo me now". Page only stopped when Kevin Nash, an ally of Hogan's who was angry at Page for (kayfabe) injuring Hogan's knee during the match at Spring Stampede, came back from injury and chased him away.

On April 26, 1999, Page lost and regained his title in the span of two hours. Sting challenged him to defend his title in the first hour of that night's Nitro and defeated him to regain the title he had lost a year earlier. This ended Page's reign at 15 days, but he gained an opportunity to get the title back ninety minutes later. Nash came to the ring and made a challenge for a four-way match for the title, and the just-dethroned Page joined defending champion Sting and Goldberg in the match. Page regained the WCW World Heavyweight Championship by using a foreign object to hit Nash and take the win and regain the title without actually defeating the reigning champion. Nash became the number one contender shortly after and vowed to get revenge on Page for his friend Hogan, culminating in a match at Slamboree in May. Page originally retained the WCW World Heavyweight Championship after Savage interfered and hit Nash, but the match was ordered to continue by Eric Bischoff and Nash pinned Page to win the title after a powerbomb. Page dropped out of the title picture shortly thereafter.

Shortly after Slamboree, Page entered into an alliance with fellow New Jerseyan Bam Bam Bigelow and won the WCW World Tag Team Championship from then champions Perry Saturn and Raven on May 31, thanks to Chris Kanyon turning heel on former ally Raven and costing the team the championships. Page, Bigelow, and Kanyon became known as the Jersey Triad and through their alliance with WCW "President for Life" Ric Flair took advantage of the Freebird Rule in their subsequent matches (meaning any combination of the three could defend the championship). The Triad held the titles until June 10, when Saturn and Chris Benoit (now stablemates in The Revolution) took the title from them. They regained the belts at The Great American Bash three days later, and lost them to Harlem Heat at Road Wild in August. Later that night, Chris Benoit defeated Diamond Dallas Page to retain the United States title. The group broke up shortly thereafter and Page began feuding with Hogan again, joining Sid Vicious and Rick Steiner in a team effort to take on Hogan, Sting, and Goldberg. Soon after that feud ended Page turned into a hero again and feuded with both Kanyon and Bigelow before the year ended.

In 2000, with WCW under new management, Page earned a shot at the vacant WCW World Heavyweight Championship at Spring Stampede against Jeff Jarrett. In a surprise twist, Page's wife, Kimberly, turned on Page and helped Jarrett become the new WCW World Heavyweight Champion. Page got the better of Jarrett on the April 24 episode of Nitro, where he defeated Jarrett in a steel cage match to become WCW World Heavyweight Champion for the third time, then lost the title to his tag partner, actor David Arquette, three days later on Thunder; the rules stated that whoever got the pin would win the title, and Arquette pinned Jarrett's partner, Eric Bischoff. Page attempted to win the title back at Slamboree later that month in a triple cage match against Arquette and Jarrett, but lost after Arquette hit him with a guitar. Page then entered a feud with Mike Awesome, who defeated him in an Ambulance Match at The Great American Bash after Kanyon turned on Page.

Page took some time off shortly after this, but returned in late 2000 as a full-time wrestler. After Page came back he formed a tag team with Kevin Nash called The Insiders, and the team won the WCW World Tag Team Championship on November 26 at Mayhem by defeating Perfect Event (Shawn Stasiak and Chuck Palumbo). The team was temporarily stripped of the titles but won them back at Starrcade defeating Stasiak and Palumbo again. Page and Nash lost the titles to Palumbo and Sean O'Haire at Sin in January and broke up shortly thereafter. After his tag team run Page briefly feuded with the returning Kanyon, which saw Kanyon defeat Page at SuperBrawl Revenge, and Page defeating Kanyon the following night on Nitro, ending their feud. Page then moved into the World Championship picture again by facing Scott Steiner. Their feud hit a climax at WCW's final PPV Greed, saw Page's final match in WCW as he passed out in Steiner's finisher, The Steiner Recliner, after refusing to tap out.

=== World Wrestling Federation (2001–2002) ===
When WCW was purchased by WWF owner Vince McMahon in 2001, Page was one of the few major WCW stars (along with Booker T and Buff Bagwell) who accepted buyouts of their AOL Time Warner contracts in order to immediately sign with McMahon. He debuted in the World Wrestling Federation (WWF) on the June 18, 2001, episode of Raw when he unveiled himself as the stalker of The Undertaker's wife, Sara, thus establishing himself as a heel. Page revealed he didn't care about Sara; he only did it to make an impact and wanted to take on the "biggest dog in the yard". At King of the Ring on June 24, he fought The Undertaker in an unsanctioned brawl that was never announced as an official match. On the July 5 episode of SmackDown!, Page competed against WCW Champion Booker T, but failed to win the title after a distraction from The Undertaker. On the July 9 episode of Raw, WCW owner Shane McMahon and ECW owner Paul Heyman joined to create The Alliance, with former WCW and ECW alumni joining forces in an attempt to take control of the WWF. At the Invasion pay-per-view on July 22, Page formed part of Team Alliance alongside Booker T, Rhyno and The Dudley Boyz, defeating Team WWF, after Team WWF member Stone Cold Steve Austin turned on his team members mid-match.

Page and Chris Kanyon reunited on the August 6 episode of Raw when Kanyon helped Page attack The Undertaker backstage. Three days later on the August 9 episode of SmackDown!, Page and Kanyon defeated the APA to win the WWF Tag Team Championship.

His feud with The Undertaker culminated when The Undertaker and Kane defeated Page and Kanyon at SummerSlam on August 19 in a Steel cage match for the WWF Tag Team Championship and WCW Tag Team Championship. During the match, Page was injured, keeping him out of action until late October. While Page was injured, he developed a new gimmick in which he became a motivational speaker. The character involved Page constantly smiling and acting optimistic, with his trademark phrase "That's not a bad thing... that's... a good thing".

His return televised match was on November 3 at Rebellion losing to Big Show. After the Alliance lost at Survivor Series on November 18, Page, along with the rest of the Alliance members, kayfabe lost their jobs.

Page eventually returned as a face and won his job back by defeating Big Boss Man on the January 17, 2002, episode of SmackDown!. Page competed in the Royal Rumble match at the Royal Rumble on January 20 but did not win.

Page became the WWF European Champion on the January 31 episode of SmackDown!, when he defeated Christian, a former follower of his positive "philosophy." At WrestleMania X8 on March 17, Page successfully retained in a rematch against Christian. He lost the title to William Regal on the March 21 episode of SmackDown!. On the March 25 episode of Raw, Page was drafted to the SmackDown! brand as part of the 2002 WWF draft lottery.

On the April 18 episode of SmackDown!, he sustained a serious neck injury during a match with Hardcore Holly, after botching a superplex. After receiving opinions from multiple doctors, Page announced his retirement in June. He left the promotion soon after.

=== Return to Wrestling (2004) ===
In 2004, Page made his in-ring return by wrestling for several independent promotions. His first match was on April 21, 2004, teaming with Satoshi Kojima as they lost to former WCW star Sting and The Great Muta for HCW Battle Hawaii.

=== Total Nonstop Action Wrestling (2004–2005) ===
He signed with Total Nonstop Action Wrestling (TNA). He debuted for the company on the November 12 taping of Impact!, where he attacked Raven, beginning a feud between the two. At Turning Point on December 5, DDP defeated Raven. and at Final Resolution in January 2005, Page competed in a three-way elimination match to determine the number one contender for the NWA World Heavyweight Championship also involving Monty Brown and Kevin Nash, which was won by Brown. Page and Brown subsequently formed a tag team. The following month at Against All Odds, Page and Brown defeated Team Canada (Bobby Roode and Eric Young). Page received an NWA World Heavyweight Championship title shot on March 13 at Destination X, but was defeated by reigning champion Jeff Jarrett when Brown turned heel and hit Page with the Pounce. At Lockdown, Page teamed with B.G. James and Waltman to defeat Jeff Jarrett, Monty Brown and The Outlaw in a Lethal Lockdown match. At Hard Justice on May 15, Page and Ron Killings faced Monty Brown and The Outlaw where they were defeated in what was Page's final match in TNA. Page left TNA shortly thereafter in order to pursue an acting career.

=== Independent circuit (2005–2011) ===
After TNA, Page returned to the independent circuit. He lost to Larry Zbyszko at WrestleReunion. DDP had Bruno Sammartino in his corner during the match. Then Page defeated Buff Bagwell on December 9, 2005, at GLCW Blizzard Brawl. In 2006, Page defeated his former Jersey Triad partner Chris Kanyon twice before retiring once again.

On August 9, 2009, Diamond Dallas Page made a special appearance for Juggalo Championship Wrestling (JCW) at their Bloodymania III event, aligning himself with the jWo. He hit his trademark Diamond Cutter finisher on Trent Acid.

DDP returned to wrestling on January 2, 2010, teaming with Air Paris to defeat Bobby Hayes and Alexander the Great at PICW event. On October 15, 2011, DDP teamed with Kevin Nash as they defeated The Rock 'n' Roll Express at AWE Night Of The Legends.

=== Return to WWE (2011–2017, 2024–present) ===
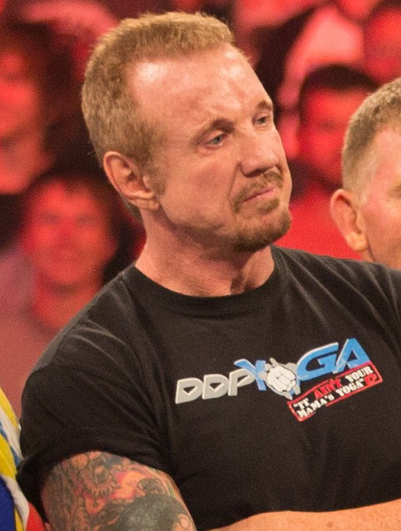
DDP on Raw's 1000th episode in July 2012

In late 2010, Page agreed to work on a DVD for WWE, titled The Very Best of WCW Monday Nitro, after being approached on the project due to his ties to WCW. Page hosted the DVD, which was released on June 7, 2011. On the June 27 episode of Raw, Page made an appearance promoting this DVD with Booker T.

In 2012, Page appeared on WWE Classics on Demand in Legends of Wrestling Roundtable: Renegades along with Jim Ross, Michael P.S. Hayes, Roddy Piper, and Gene Okerlund. Page also appeared alongside Kevin Nash and X-Pac at the WWE Hall of Fame ceremony on March 31, 2012. On July 2, 2012, Page made an appearance on Raw, where he hit a Diamond Cutter on Heath Slater. He also appeared at Raw 1000, accompanied by other WWE Legends, during Slater's match with Lita.

On the January 6, 2014, episode of Raw, Page, along with a number of other legends, appeared on the show as part of its "Old School" theme. On April 5, Page inducted his wrestling mentor and noted DDP Yoga practitioner Jake Roberts into the WWE Hall of Fame.

On January 25, 2015, at Royal Rumble, Page was a surprise entrant in the Rumble match, entering at number 14 and hitting his finishing move, the Diamond Cutter, on Stardust, Bray Wyatt and Fandango from the top rope, before being eliminated by Rusev. At WrestleMania 32, Page competed in the Andre the Giant Memorial Battle Royal, but was eliminated by Konnor.

On March 31, 2017, Page was inducted into the WWE Hall of Fame in Orlando, Florida.

On October 6, 2024, Page announced via his Twitter that he had signed with WWE under a legend contract after his appearance in the crowds at the Bad Blood PPV event. During WrestleMania weekend in April 2025, Dallas inducted long-time friend Lex Luger into the WWE Hall of Fame.

=== All In (2018) ===
At All In on September 1, 2018, Page accompanied Cody Rhodes in his match against NWA Worlds Heavyweight Champion Nick Aldis.

=== All Elite Wrestling (2019–2020) ===
On May 25, 2019, during their inaugural pay-per-view Double or Nothing, Page escorted Brandi Rhodes away from the ring after she refused to leave the match between Cody Rhodes and Dustin Rhodes after match referee Earl Hebner ejected her from the match. On the October 23, 2019, episode of AEW Dynamite, Page returned to TNT programming for the first time in over 18 years, and helped Cody attack Chris Jericho and his stable The Inner Circle. On November 27, 2019, Page returned to Dynamite to present MJF with the first ever Dynamite Diamond Ring as a prize for defeating Adam Page. On January 15, 2020, at Bash at the Beach, Page had his last match, teaming with Dustin Rhodes and Q. T. Marshall to take on MJF and The Butcher and The Blade in a losing effort.

== Fitness career ==
Page developed a yoga fitness program initially called Yoga for Regular Guys Workout (YRG), after discovering the health benefits of yoga through his then-wife Kimberly while he recovered from ruptures to his L4/L5 discs in 1998. His favorite kind of yoga (according to his "Yoga for Regular Guys" book published in 2005) is "Power Yoga", an American-style version of "Ashtanga Style" yoga. Page worked with chiropractor Dr. Craig Aaron, and developed the Yoga for Regular Guys Workout.

Page developed the book into a series of workout videos titled DDP Yoga (formerly YRG). DDP Yoga was featured in a video about Arthur Boorman in May 2012. The story was picked up by the mainstream media, including Good Morning America. The video describes the journey of Arthur Boorman, a disabled veteran who was told by doctors he would never walk again. After spending fifteen years on crutches, Boorman followed Page's yoga plan for ten months and documented his progress on home video. He lost 140 pounds and regained the strength and flexibility to walk and run without his crutches, back braces or leg braces.

On February 21, 2014, Page appeared on the ABC series Shark Tank, where he was seeking $200,000 for a 5% share in the DDP Yoga company. He declined to sell a 50% share for that same amount to Kevin O'Leary. Page had hoped to use the money to develop a mobile app. The other investors were impressed by Boorman's improvement but believed the home exercise market was too competitive and also predicted net profits ($800,000 in the previous year) would fall. Page later said he sold more than $1 million worth of products in the first six days after his appearance.

In 2017 Chuck Carroll of CBS wrote on the impact of DDP Yoga stating "The program has extended the careers of fellow wrestlers and improved the quality of life of those who hung up the boots long ago. But some of the biggest success stories are from the average Joes who have used the app to achieve radical body transformations."

== Other media ==
Page released his autobiography, Positively Page: The Diamond Dallas Page Journey, on February 1, 2000. On January 15, 2019, Rodale Books released Page's second book, Positively Unstoppable: The Art of Owning It. The book includes a foreword by Mick Foley.

In 2015, he helped produce The Resurrection of Jake the Snake, a documentary that chronicled the rehabilitation of Jake Roberts.

In 2016, Page was featured on the Nine Legends Expansion Pack to talk about his friend Bill Goldberg.

Page currently hosts a radio show titled DDP Radio. In 2022, Page co-hosted a podcast with Jake Roberts and Conrad Thompson titled DDP Snakepit.

=== Film career ===
Page made his acting debut in the 1999 action thriller television film First Daughter, where he played Dirk Lindman. He went on to make cameo appearances in Brak Presents the Brak Show Starring Brak and Ready to Rumble in 2000. In 2005, he had a few minor roles, such as Sleazy Guy in The Nice Guys and Billy Ray Snapper in The Devil's Rejects. He had a starring role as Jersey in the 2006 comedy horror film Hood of Horror and co-starred alongside Raviv Ullman in the 2006 horror film Driftwood. In 2011, Page co-starred with Frankie Muniz in the superhero comedy film Pizza Man. Page had another starring role as Skullbucket in the 2012 horror western film Gallowwalkers.

In 2014, Page co-starred in the crime thriller Vengeance with Danny Trejo. Page was one of several professional wrestlers to appear in the 2016 comedy film The Bet. In 2022, Page played Knight Hawk, the main character of the live-action/adult animated mixed media superhero television series The Guardians of Justice. The show premiered on Netflix on March 1, 2022. In 2022, Page also played Dom in the action film High Heat.

=== YouTube ===
Dallas Page

YouTube information
- Channel: DDP YOGA
- Years active: 2010–present
- Genre: Physical fitness
- Subscribers: 759 thousand
- Views: 318 million
- Last updated: March 23, 2026

Since 2011, Page has used his YouTube channel as an outlet to advertise his DDP Yoga program. In 2012, the channel gained significant traction after he shared a story about Arthur Boorman, a disabled 47-year-old veteran, who lost 140 lbs in 10 months using DDP Yoga.

Page invited fellow former professional wrestlers Jake Roberts and Scott Hall to live in his house, which he nicknamed the "accountability crib", while the two rehabilitated their injuries and got sober.

In 2022 Page helped former professional boxer Eric Esch better known as "Butterbean" regain his strength and lose the weight he needed to have hip replacement surgery.

In 2024, Page began documenting his efforts in helping Lex Luger overcome a spinal infarction that left Luger with a pinched nerve in his neck and paralysis. By February 2025, Page had successfully brought Luger back to his feet. On April 18, 2025, Page accompanied Luger during his WWE Hall of Fame induction where Luger was able to walk to the podium.

== Personal life ==
Dallas Page has been married three times. His first marriage began in 1991 to Kimberly Page. The two divorced in 2005. In 2015, Page married his second wife Brenda Nair and they divorced in 2020. Since 2021, Page has been married to Payge McMahon.

Page has two daughters, Brittany Page (born 1987) and Kimberly Page (born 1994), and two stepdaughters, (Alexandra) Lexy Nair (born 1996) and Rachel Nair (born 2001). Lexy currently works with All Elite Wrestling (AEW) as a backstage interviewer.

He had his name legally changed to Dallas Page in 2003.

=== Legal issues ===
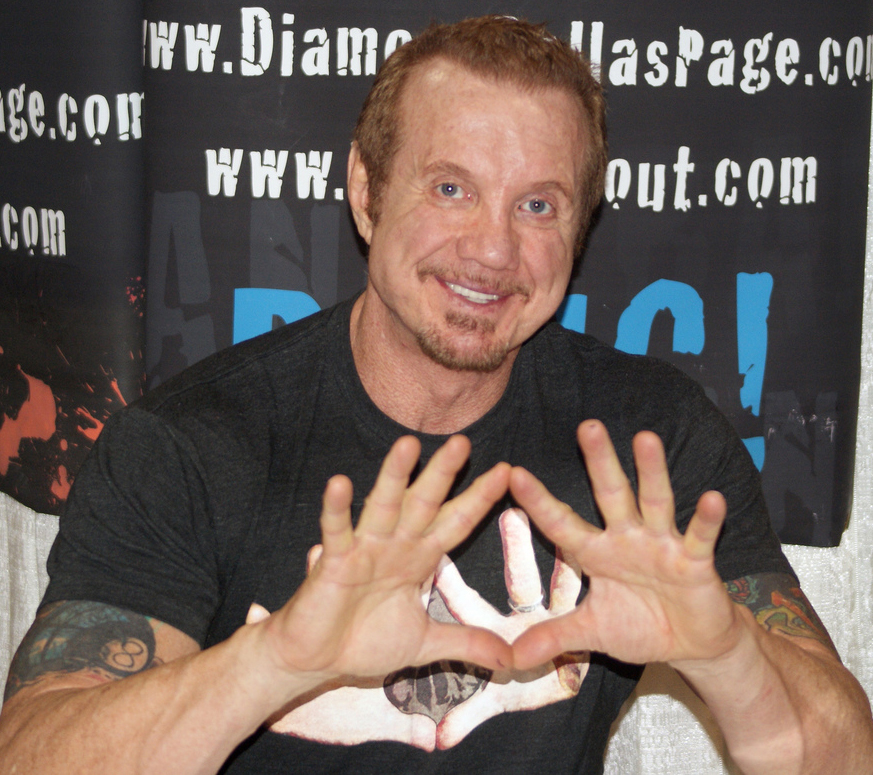
Page demonstrating his "Diamond Cutter" hand symbol in 2011

Page is commonly associated with the "Self High Five" as well as the "Diamond Cutter" symbol, a hand gesture made by joining the thumbs and index fingers on each hand to form a diamond shape, then parting the two hands in one swift motion. He created the symbol in 1996 and later trademarked it. In December 2005, Page filed a lawsuit against rapper Jay-Z, who, he claimed, had "illegally adopted his trademark hand gesture". Page accused Jay-Z of trademark infringement and sought a prohibitive injunction and monetary damages. It resulted in Page dropping the lawsuit for an undisclosed amount of money. On August 31, 2010, Page filed a lawsuit against the musical duo 3OH!3 for infringement of his trademarked "Diamond Cutter" hand gesture.

Page's WCW entrance music, "Self High-Five", intentionally contained similarities to the 1991 Nirvana song "Smells Like Teen Spirit", as composer Jimmy Hart and Page felt it exemplified the "sound of the '90s". According to Page, Nirvana drummer Dave Grohl in turn claimed that "WCW owes [Nirvana] money", but before any further actions or lawsuits took place, the track was altered to "sound like it was it, but wasn't".

== Filmography ==
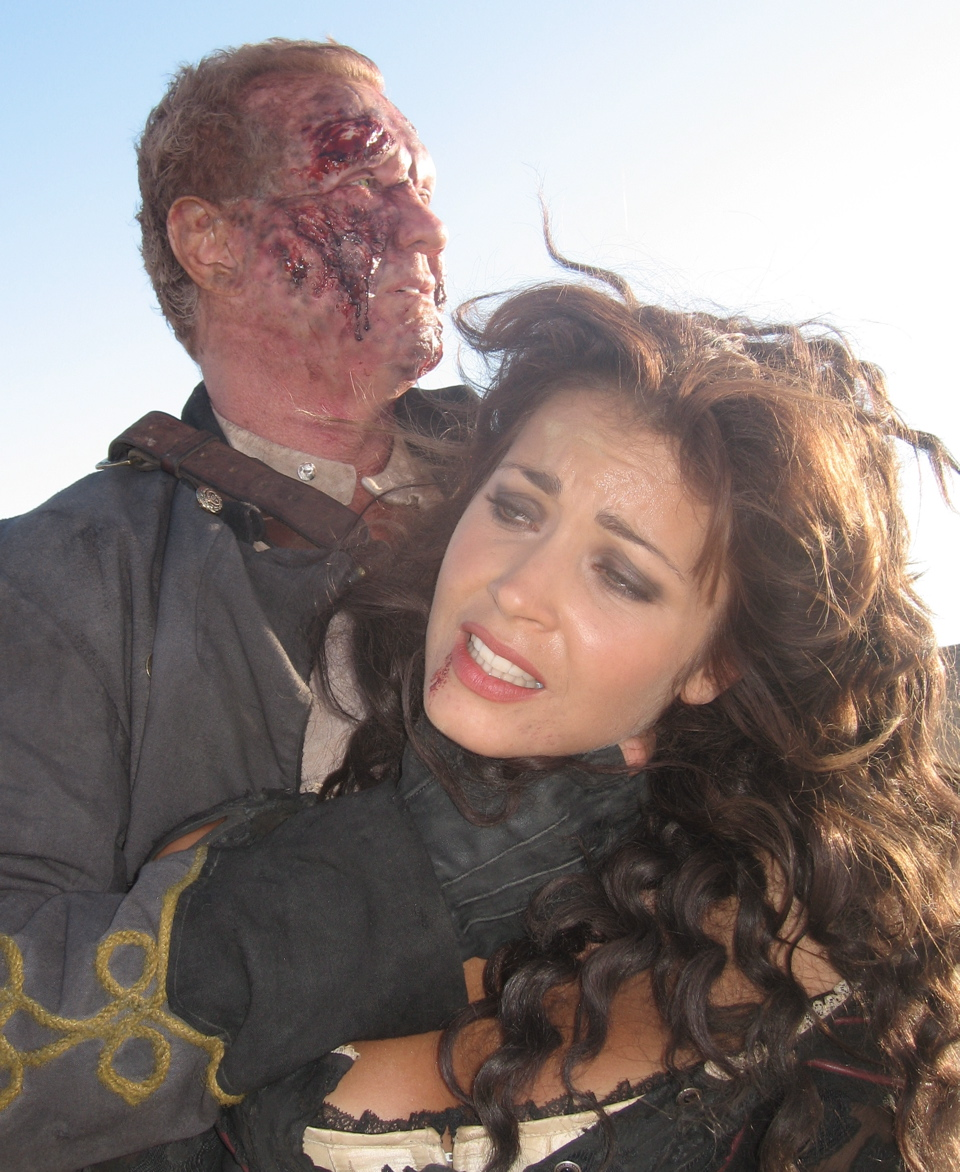
DDP as Skullbucket in Gallowwalkers (2012)

- First Daughter (1999) as Dirk Lindman
- Brak Presents the Brak Show Starring Brak (2000) as Himself
- Ready to Rumble (2000) as Himself
- Rat Race (2001) in a deleted scene
- Nice Guys (2005) as Sleezy Guy
- The Devil's Rejects (2005) as Billy Ray Snapper
- The 40-Year-Old Virgin (deleted scene)
- Jack's Law (2006) as Spider Benson
- Hood of Horror (2006) as Jersey
- Splinter (2006) as Detective Stiles
- Driftwood (2006) as Captain Kennedy
- Knight Fever (2008)
- Sensory Perception (2010) as Mr. Harrington
- Pizza Man (2011) as John Kryder / The Big Cheese
- Gallowwalkers (2012) as Skullbucket
- Vengeance (2014) as Spider Benson
- The Murders of Brandywine Theater (2014) as Officer Carwin
- The Resurrection of Jake the Snake (2015) as Himself
- The Bet (2016) as Mr. Baker
- Penance Lane (2020) as Hyson
- The Guardians of Justice (2022) as Knight Hawk
- High Heat (2022) as Dom
- Homestead (2023) as Lewis

== Video games ==
Page has been depicted in several licensed wrestling video games.

Year	Title	Notes
1997	WCW vs. nWo: World Tour	Video game debut
1997	Virtual Pro Wrestling 64	
1997	WCW Nitro	
1998	WCW/nWo Revenge	
1999	WCW/nWo Thunder	
1999	WCW Mayhem	
2000	WCW Backstage Assault	
2002	WWE SmackDown! Shut Your Mouth	
2004	Showdown: Legends of Wrestling	
2012	WWE '13	As downloadable content
2014	WWE SuperCard	Mobile game
2014	WWE 2K15	As downloadable content
2015	WWE 2K16	
2016	WWE 2K17	
2017	WWE: Champions	Mobile game
2017	WWE Tap Mania	Mobile game
2017	WWE 2K18	
2018	WWE 2K19	
2023	WrestleQuest	
2024	WWE 2K24	As downloadable content
2025	WWE 2K25	
2026	WWE 2K26	

== Bibliography ==
- Genta, Larry and Page, Diamond Dallas (2000) Positively Page, ISBN 0-9679922-0-6
- Aaron, Craig and Page, Diamond Dallas (2005) Yoga for Regular Guys: The Best Damn Workout on the Planet, ISBN 1-59474-079-8
- Page, Diamond Dallas (2019) Positively Unstoppable: The Art of Owning It, ISBN 978-1635650204

== Championships and accomplishments ==
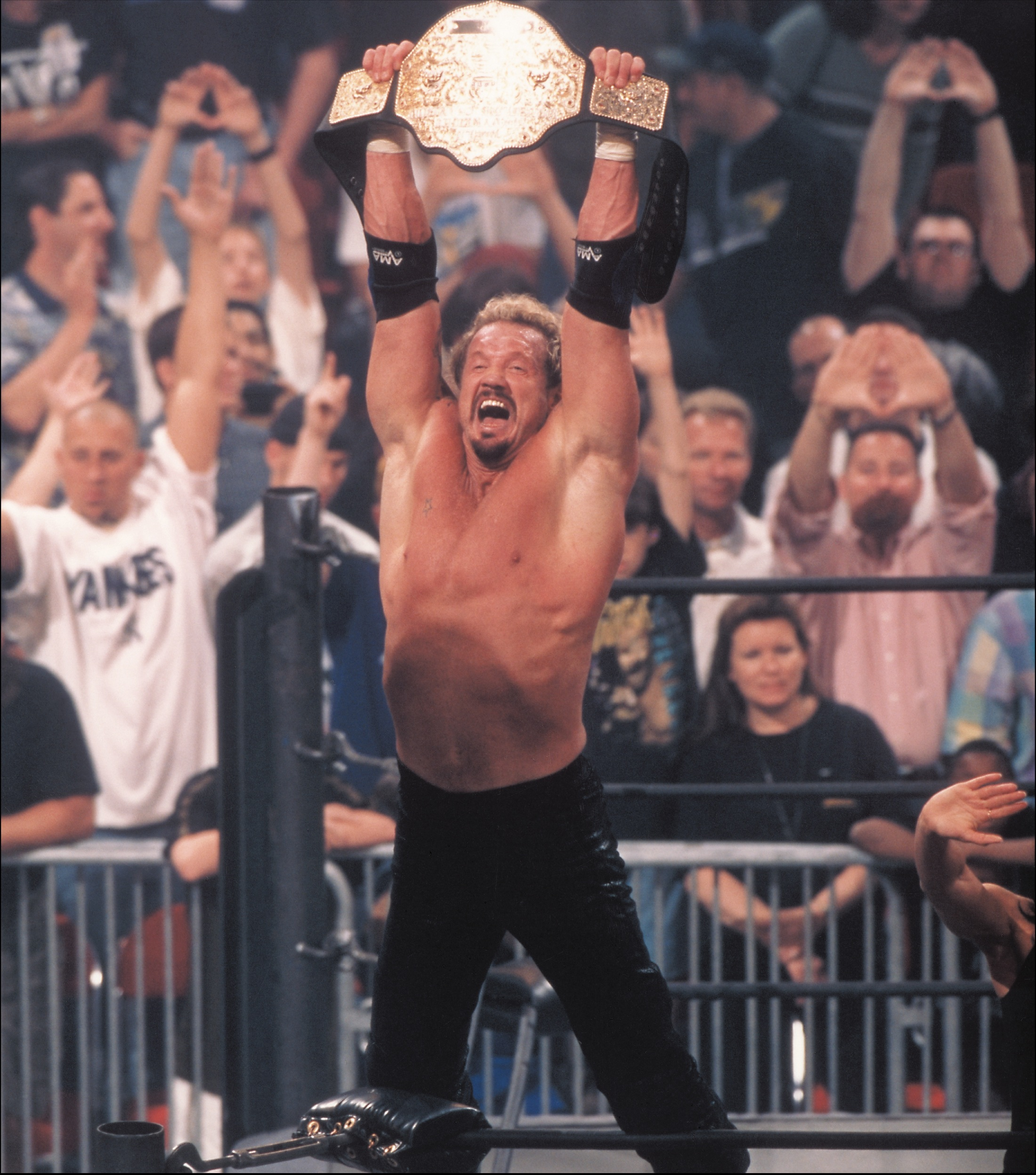
DDP is a three-time WCW World Heavyweight Champion.

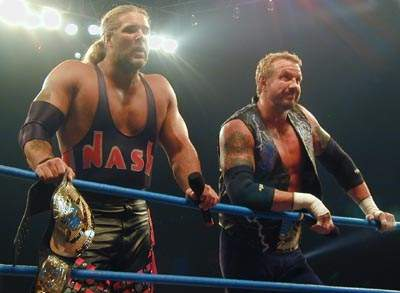
DDP is a four-time WCW World Tag Team Champion, including two reigns with Kevin Nash as The Insiders.

- Cauliflower Alley Club
  - Jason Sanderson Humanitarian Award (2015)
  - Men's Wrestling Award (2015)
- George Tragos/Lou Thesz Professional Wrestling Hall of Fame
  - Frank Gotch Award (2014)
- Pro Wrestling Illustrated
  - Feud of the Year (1997) vs. Randy Savage
  - Most Hated Wrestler of the Year (1999)
  - Most Improved Wrestler of the Year (1995)
  - Ranked No. 4 of the top 500 singles wrestlers of the year in the PWI 500 in 1997 and 1998
  - Ranked No. 65 of the top 500 singles wrestlers of the PWI Years in 2003
- Swiss Wrestling Federation
  - SWF Heavyweight Championship (1 time)
- World Championship Wrestling
  - WCW World Heavyweight Championship (3 times)
  - WCW World Television Championship (1 time)
  - WCW United States Heavyweight Championship (2 times)
  - WCW World Tag Team Championship (4 times) – with Bam Bam Bigelow (1), Bam Bam Bigelow and Chris Kanyon (1), and Kevin Nash (2) (Note: Page defended the title with either Kanyon or Bigelow under the Freebird Rule.)
  - Fourth WCW Triple Crown Champion
  - Lord of The Ring Tournament (1996)
- World Wrestling Federation/World Wrestling Entertainment/WWE
  - WWF European Championship (1 time)
  - WWF Tag Team Championship (1 time) – with Chris Kanyon
  - WWE Hall of Fame (Class of 2017)
- Wrestling Observer Newsletter
  - Best Wrestling Maneuver (1997) Diamond Cutter
  - Most Improved (1996)
  - Worst Gimmick (2001)
