= Ansan (disambiguation) =

Ansan is a city in Gyeonggi Province, South Korea.

Ansan may also refer to:

== Places ==
- Ansan (Gangwon), a mountain in Gangwon Province, South Korea
- Ansan, Gers, a commune of the Gers département, France
- Ansan (Seoul), a mountain in Seoul, South Korea

== Other uses ==
- Ansan (karate), a kata
- An San, a South Korean archer

== See also ==
- Anshan (disambiguation)
- Ansen
- Anson (disambiguation)
