= Anshan (ship) =

Ships named Anshan include:

- Chinese destroyer Anshan (101)
- Anshan-class destroyer

== See also ==
- Anshan (disambiguation)
