= Annan (kata) =

Karate kata

Annan (or Anan or Ahnan (安南)) is a karate kata, which is a traditional method of recording a sequence of movements for offense and defense. The origin and the creator of this kata are unknown, but its preservation and appearance in Okinawa can be credited to Nakaima Norisato, an Okinawan martial artist that was able to fully document and record fighting techniques learned during his study and travels in China. Nakaima, a Chinese scholar, studied with the top Chinese martial arts practitioners in the Beijing area during the mid-19th century.

The kata contains many palm heel strikes as well as evasive footwork. The open hand and crane fist techniques lend credibility to this kata having roots in Chinese kung fu. The techniques can be applied as short-distance strikes and grappling to immobilize and control the opponent.

== Origins ==
It is known that this kata has been passed down through an old family style of Karate called Ryūei-ryū. This style of karate still exists today, with the techniques passed down to only seven chief instructors worldwide. Norisato Nakaima is credited with bringing the kata to Naha after learning it during his study in China. The techniques learned by Nakaima were handed down only within the family until the late 1960s. Among the more renowned practitioners of Ryueiryu are the former multiple world champion T. Sakumoto, T. Arashiro, an Okinawan residing in the United States since 1979 teaching sport Karate and G. Campbell, an American practitioner of Oriental Medicine that teaches the family art privately.
