= List of Gintama chapters =

First volume from Gintama published by Shueisha on April 2, 2004

The chapters of the Japanese manga series Gintama are written and illustrated by Hideaki Sorachi. They have been serialized for the shōnen manga anthology book Weekly Shōnen Jump from Shueisha since December 8, 2003. It is set in an Edo which has been conquered by aliens named Amanto. The plot follows the life from the samurai Gintoki Sakata who works as a free-lancer along his friends, Shinpachi Shimura and Kagura, in order to pay the monthly rent from where he lives.

Over seven-hundred chapters identified as a "Lesson" have been serialized. Viz Media licensed Gintama for publication in North America. A 55-page preview from the series was first featured in the January 2006 Shonen Jump issue. Viz acquired the license to publish chapters from the series in the Shonen Jump during San Diego Comic-Con from 2006. The chapters were serialized in Shonen Jump from January to May 2007 at a rate of one chapter a month. Shueisha is also publishing the first chapters of Gintama online on their Weekly Shōnen Jump official website. On April 4, 2006, an anime adaptation from the series, developed by Sunrise and directed initially by Shinji Takamatsu and later by Yoichi Fujita, premiered on TV Tokyo.

Shueisha collected the chapters in tankōbon volumes with the first being published on April 2, 2004. Seventy-seven volumes have been released in Japan. In North America tankōbon were published in under Viz's "Shonen Jump Advanced" imprint. The first volume was published on July 3, 2007, and publication ended with the twenty-third on August 2, 2011.

== Volumes ==
=== Volumes 1–20 ===
No.	Title	Original release date	English release date
1	Nobody with Naturally Wavy Hair Can Be That Bad; Tennen Pāma ni Warui Yatsu wa Inai (天然パーマに悪い奴はいない)	April 2, 2004; 4-08-873623-0	July 3, 2007; 978-1-4215-1358-4
Lesson 1. "Nobody with Naturally Wavy Hair Can Be That Bad" (天然パーマに悪い奴はいない, Tennen Pāma ni Warui Yatsu wa Inai); Lesson 2. "Responsible Owners Should Clean Up After Their Pets" (ペットは飼主が責任を持って最後まで面倒を見ましょう, Petto wa Kainushi ga Sekinin o Motte Saigo made Mendō o Mimashō); Lesson 3. "Watch Out! Weekly Shonen Jump Sometimes Comes Out on Saturdays!" (ジャンプは時々土曜日に出るから気を付けろ, Janpu wa Tokidoki Doyōbi ni Deru kara Ki o Tsukero); Lesson 4. "People Who Make Good First Impressions Usually Suck" (第一印象がいい奴にロクな奴はいない, Dai Ichi Inshō ga Ii Yatsu ni Roku na Yatsu wa Inai); Lesson 5. "Make Friends You Can Call by Their Nicknames, Even When You're an Old Fart" (ジジイになってもあだ名で呼び合える友達を作れ, Jijii ni Nattemo Adana de Yobiaeru Tomodachi o Tsukure); Lesson 6. "If You Jerks Have Enough Free Time to Spread Terror, You'd Better Go Walk Your Dog, Pero" (お前らテロなんてやってる暇があるならペロの散歩にでも行ってきな, Omaera Tero Nante Yatteru Hima ga Aru Nara Pero no Sanpo ni demo Ittekina); Dandelion (だんでらいおん, Danderaion)
Samurai Gintoki Sakata works in a freelancer business, Odd Jobs Gin, after Edo was conquered by aliens named Amanto in order to pay the monthly rent from where he lives. In his days, Gintoki is joined by Shinpachi Shimura, a teenager son of a samurai who wants to learn about him, and Kagura, an alien girl who went to Earth to earn money for her poor family, but is unable to return home and threatens Gintoki to let her live with him. While Kagura and Shinpachi live with Gintoki, they meet a terrorist named Kotaro Katsura who participated alongside Gintoki in the war between samurais and aliens, and lost. Odd Jobs is forced to help Katsura escape from the Shinsengumi, a police force working for the Bakufu, after they accidentally perform a terrorist attack. The volume ends with a one-shot from Sorachi named "Dandelion", which explores the work of a pair of exorcists.
2	Fighting Should Be Done with Fists; Nebarizuyosa to Shitsukosa wa Kami Hitoe (粘り強さとしつこさは紙一重)	July 2, 2004; 4-08-873632-X	September 4, 2007; 978-1-4215-1359-1
Lesson 7. "Keep a Promise Even If It Kills You" (一度した約束は死んでも守れ, Ichi Do Shita Yakusoku wa Shindemo Mamore); Lesson 8. "There Is Butt a Fine Line Between Persistence and Stubbornness" (粘り強さとしつこさは紙一重, Nebarizuyosa to Shitsukosa wa Kami Hitoe); Lesson 9. "Fighting Should Be Done with Fists" (喧嘩はグーでやるべし, Kenka wa Gū de Yarubeshi); Lesson 10. "Eat Something Sour When You're Tired" (疲れた時は酸っぱいものを, Tsukareta Toki wa Suppai Mono o); Lesson 11. "Look, Overly Sticky Sweet Dumplings Are Not Real Dumplings, You Idiot!" (べちゃべちゃした団子なんてなぁ団子じゃねぇバカヤロー, Bechabecha Shita Dango Nante nā Dango Janē Bakayarō); Lesson 12. "Young Girls Across the Country, Get Home Before Curfew" (全国のコギャルども門限は守れ, Zenkoku no Kogyaru Domo Mongen wa Mamore); Lesson 13. "Only Dirty Things Are Born of Toilets" (便所で生まれるのは汚れたものばかり, Benjo de Umareru no wa Yogoreta Mono Bakari); Shirokuro (しろくろ, Shirokuro)
After being repeatedly stalked by the Shinsengumi commander, Isao Kondo, Tae Shimura, Shinpachi's older sister, makes Gintoki have a fake duel against Kondo to stop him. Gintoki breaks Kondo's sword before the duel, and easily wins, capturing the attention of other Shinsengumi members. In other chapters, Kagura adopts an inugami which she names Sadaharu, Odd Jobs look for a woman, whom a dying elder had feelings for, and Gintoki helps a criminal meet his daughter, the idol Tsu "Otsu" Terakado. In another job, the trio searches for their client's daughter, who was kidnapped by the space pirates Harusame. Although they rescue her, Kagura and Shinpachi are at same time kidnapped by Harusame, and Katsura decides to help Gintoki rescue them. Another one-shot, "Shirokuro", ends the volume with its story being focused on a spirits' protector to take care of a voodoo witch.
3	If You're a Man, Try the Swordfish! Kangaetara Jinsei tte Ossan ni Natte kara no Hō ga Nagai Janē ka! Kowa'!! (考えたら人生ってオッさんになってからの方が長いじゃねーか!恐っ!!)	September 3, 2004; 4-08-873653-2	November 6, 2007; 978-1-4215-1360-7
Lesson 14. "If You're Going to Go in Costume, Go All Out" (コスプレするなら心まで飾れ, Kosupure Suru Nara Kokoro made Kazare); Lesson 15. "Boys Have a Weird Ritual That Makes Them Think They Turn into Men When They Touch a Frog" (男にはカエルに触れて一人前みたいな訳のわからないルールがある, Otoko ni wa Kaeru ni Sawarete Ichininmae Mitai na Wake no Wakaranai Rūru ga Aru); Lesson 16. "If You Stop and Think About It, Your Life's a Lot Longer as an Old Guy than a Kid! Whoa, Scary!!" (考えたら人生ってオッさんになってからの方が長いじゃねーか!恐っ!!, Kangaetara Jinsei tte Ossan ni Natte kara no Hō ga Nagai Janē ka! Kowa'!!); Lesson 17. "Even If You Aren't Drunk, Pretend You Are and Steal Your Boss's Toupee" (酔ってなくても酔ったふりして上司のヅラ取れ, Yottenakutemo Yotta Furi Shite Jōshi no Zura Tore); Lesson 18. "If You're a Man, Try the Swordfish!" (男ならとりあえずカジキ!, Otoko Nara Toriaezu Kajiki!); Lesson 19. "Even Teen Idols Act like You Guys" (アイドルだって ほぼお前らと同じことやってんだよ, Aidoru Datte Hobo Omaera to Onaji Koto Yattenda yo); Lesson 20. "Pets Resemble Their Owners" (飼い主とペットは似る, Kainushi to Petto wa Niru); Lesson 21. "Kids' Annoyance Factor Is Proportional to the Length of Their Hair" (襟足の長さと子供の憎たらしさは比例する, Eriashi no Nagasa to Kodomo no Nikutarashisa wa Hirei Suru); Lesson 22. "Stress Makes You Bald, but It's Stressful to Avoid Stress, so You End Up Stressed Out Anyway, so in the End There's Nothing You Can Do" (ストレスはハゲる原因になるがストレスをためないように気を配るとそこでまたストレスがたまるので結局僕らにできることなんて何もない, Sutoresu wa Hageru Gen'in ni Naru Ga Sutoresu o Tamenai Yō ni Ki o Kubaru to Soko de Mata Sutoresu ga Tamaru no de Kekkyoku Bokura ni Dekiru Koto Nante Nanimo Nai)
Continuing from the previous volume, Gintoki successfully rescues his friends with Katsura's help. In the meantime, Odd Jobs come into contact with the Shinsengumi with Kondo still stalking Tae and the vice-commander Toshiro Hijikata having started a rivalry with Gintoki, Katsura adopts a mysterious alien pet named Elizabeth, and Gintoki befriends an unemployed man named Taizo Hasegawa. Odd Jobs also works to find a person threatening Otsu, and help a kappa-like alien defend his lake from developers who want to get rid of it. In the last chapters, Gintoki is suspected of provoking fires and helps a girl to arrest the real person responsible.
4	Exaggerate the Tales of Your Exploits by a Third, so Everyone Has a Good Time; Oyako tte no wa Ya na Toko Bakari Niru Mon Da (親子ってのは嫌なとこばかり似るもんだ)	November 4, 2004; 4-08-873672-9	January 1, 2008; 978-1-4215-1361-4
Lesson 23. "You Only Gotta Wash Under Your Armpits—Just the Armpits" (脇だけ洗っときゃいいんだよ 脇だけ, Waki Dake Arattokya Iinda yo Waki Dake); Lesson 24. "Exaggerate the Tales of Your Exploits by a Third, so Everyone Has a Good Time" (昔の武勇伝は三割増で話せ 盛り上ればいいんだよ 盛り上れば, Mukashi no Buyūden wa San Wari Mashi de Hanase Moriagareba Iinda yo Moriagareba); Lesson 25. "You Say Kawaiiii So Often, You Must Really Think You're Cute Stuff" (カワイイを連発する自分自身をカワイイと思ってんだろ お前ら, Kawaii o Renpatsu Suru Jibun Jishin o Kawaii to Omottendaro Omaera); Lesson 26. "You Can Forget to Bring Spare Undies on a Voyage, but Don't Forget UNO" (旅にはパンツは忘れてもUNOは忘れるな, Tabi ni wa Pantsu wa Wasuretemo Uno wa Wasureruna); Lesson 27. "When You're in a Fix, Keep On Laughing, Laughing..." (困った時は笑っとけ笑っとけ, Komatta Toki wa Warattoke Warattoke); Lesson 28. "Oh, Yeah! Our Crib Is Number One!" (ああ やっぱり我が家が一番だわ, Aa Yappari Wa ga Ya ga Ichiban Da wa); Lesson 29. "You Really Think You Can Study for Exams While Listening to Music?! Turn It Off Already!!" (音楽なんて聴きながら受験勉強なんてできると思ってんのか お前は!もう切りなさい!, Ongaku Nante Kikinagara Juken Benkyō Nante Dekiru to Omottenno ka Omae wa! Mō Kirinasai!); Lesson 30. "It's Not the Bad Guys Who Cause Calamities, It's the Hyperactive Types" (事件は悪い奴が起こすんじゃない はしゃぎすぎた奴が起こすんだ, Jiken wa Warui Yatsu ga Okosunjanai Hashagisugita Yatsu ga Okosunda); Lesson 31. "Sons Only Take After Their Fathers' Negative Attributes" (親子ってのは嫌なとこばかり似るもんだ, Oyako tte no wa Ya na Toko Bakari Niru Mon Da)
One-shot chapters of this volume depict Kagura befriending a runaway princess, Gintoki protecting an alien named Catherine from her former comrades who want her to be a thief again, and Odd Jobs being requested to find their client's boyfriend and capture a thief of female underwear. In other chapters, Odd Jobs win a trip to space, meeting in the trip an old friend from Gintoki from the war, Tatsuma Sakamoto, who is now a businessman in the galaxy. Another old comrade, Shinsuke Takasugi, is revealed to have a plan to kill the shogun in a festival with the help of the mechanic Gengai Hiraga, who hates the bakufu. However, once the plan is foiled by Odd Jobs and the Shinsengumi, Gengai decides to abandon his hatred.
5	Watch Out for Conveyor Belts! Beruto Konbea ni wa Ki o Tsukero (ベルトコンベアには気を付けろ)	December 27, 2004; 4-08-873697-4	March 4, 2008; 978-1-4215-1618-9
Lesson 32. "Why's the Sea So Salty? Because You City Folk Pee Whenever You Go Swimming!" (海の水がなぜしょっぱいかだと?オメーら都会人が泳ぎながら用足してくからだろーがｧｧ!!, Umi no Mizu ga Naze Shoppai ka Da to? Omēra Tokaijin ga Oyoginagara Yō Tashiteku kara Darō Gaaa!!); Lesson 33. "Watch Out for Conveyor Belts!" (ベルトコンベアには気を付けろ, Beruto Konbea ni wa Ki o Tsukero); Lesson 34. "Guys with Inferiority Complexes Get Big Jobs Done" (コンプレックスがデカイ奴は成す仕事もデカイ, Konpurekkusu ga Dekai Yatsu wa Nasu Shigoto mo Dekai); Lesson 35. "Don't Panic—There's a Return Policy!" (慌てるな!クーリングオフというものがある, Awateruna! Kūringu Ofu to Iu Mono ga Aru); Lesson 36. "Don't Be Shy—Just Raise Your Hand and Say It" (恥ずかしがらずに手を挙げて言え, Hazukashigarazu ni Te wo Agete Ie); Lesson 37. "Stop Riding Your Bike like You're in a Biker Gang" (暴走はもうやめろ, Bōsō wa Mō Yamero); Lesson 38. "Okama Know About Everything, from Men's Stupidity to Women's Craftiness" (オカマは男のバカさも女のズルさも全部知ってる, Okama wa Otoko no Bakasa mo Onna no Zurusa mo Zenbu Shitteru); Lesson 39. "Cute Faces Are Always Hiding Something" (カワイイ顔には必ず何かが隠れてる, Kawaii Kao ni wa Kanarazu Nanika ga Kakureteru); Lesson 40. "Marriage Is Prolonging an Illusion for Your Whole Life" (結婚とは勘違いを一生涯し続けることだ, Kekkon to wa Kanchigai o Isshōgai Shitsuzukeru Koto Da)
In one-shot chapters, Gintoki and Hasegawa try to make money by defeating an alien that has been terrorizing the area, Kagura is attacked by a crazy sword collector when she is trying to return a wooden-sword she bought and Gintoki helps the kunoichi Ayame Sarutobi complete one of her missions. Hijikata suspects their base is haunted by a ghost and Odd Jobs is forced to help the Shinsengumi to find once they try to trick them. Shinpachi discovers an old friend has become part of a criminal gang, and he and his friends try to make him quit. Katsura and Gintoki get roped into working at an okama bar, where they work to try to help his son come to grips his travesti father, the boss of the bar, Kishin Mademoiselle Saigou.
6	Some Things You Can't Cut with a Sword; Katana ja Kirenai Mono ga Aru (刀じゃ斬れないものがある)	March 4, 2005; 4-08-873781-4	May 6, 2008; 978-1-4215-1619-6
Lesson 41. "Think for a Minute Now, Do Matsutake Mushrooms Really Taste All That Good?" (そんなに松茸って美味しいもんなのか一度よく考えてみよう, Sonna ni Matsutake tte Oishii Mon na no ka Ichi Do Yoku Kangaetemiyō); Lesson 42. "Grab Your Dreams with Your Fists" (夢は拳でつかめ, Yume wa Kobushi de Tsukame); Lesson 43. "All Men Are Romantics" (男はみんなロマンティスト, Otoko wa Minna Romantisuto); Lesson 44. "Some Things Can't Be Cut with a Sword" (刀じゃ斬れないものがある, Katana ja Kirenai Mono ga Aru); Lesson 45. "Good Things Never Come in Twos (but Bad Things Do)" (いい事は連続して起こらないくせに悪いことは連続して起こるもんだ, Ii Koto wa Renzoku Shite Okoranai Kuse ni Warui Koto wa Renzoku Shite Okoru Mon Da); Lesson 46. "The More Delicious the Food, the Nastier It Is When It Goes Bad" (美味いものほど当たると恐い, Umai Mono Hodo Ataru to Kowai); Lesson 47. "I Told You to Pay Attention to the News!" (テレビとか新聞とかちゃんと見ないとダメだって, Terebi to ka Shinbun to ka Chanto Minai to Dame Da tte); Lesson 48. "People with Dark Pasts Can't Shut Up" (すねに傷がある奴ほどよくしゃべる, Sune ni Kizu ga Aru Yatsu Hodo Yoku Shaberu); Lesson 49. "Once You've Used a Washlet, You'll Never Use a Regular Toilet Again" (一度ウォシュレット使うともうそれ以外のトイレは なんかもうダメ, Ichi Do Woshuretto Tsukau to Mō Sore Igai no Toire wa Nanka Mō Dame)
Shinsengumi Sogo Okita requests Odd Jobs to investigate an undergroung fighting ring, Rengokukan. They search for the strongest fighter, Doshin, but they discover he is killing people in the ring in order to have money to raise orphans. Doshin decides to stop fighting to leave Edo with the children, but he is killed by another fighter of Regokukan. Odd Jobs and the Shinsengumi decide to avenge Doshin by runining Rengokukan and arresting its owners. In other chapters, Kondo suffers from dangerous events watching the horoscopes, Odd Jobs meet a mushroom hunter in the mountains and after being intoxicated, Odd Jobs and Hasegawa work to help a nurse meet a patient she has feelings for, and Edo is invaded by giant coackroaches. In the last chapters, Tae requests Odd Jobs to investigate a mysterious cult run by a conman.
7	You Always Remember the Things That Matter the Least; Dō demo Ii Koto ni Kagitte Nakanaka Wasurenai (どうでもいいことに限ってなかなか忘れない)	May 2, 2005; 4-08-873806-3	July 1, 2008; 978-1-4215-1620-2
Lesson 50. "You Always Remember the Things That Matter the Least" (どうでもいいことに限ってなかなか忘れない, Dō demo Ii Koto ni Kagitte Nakanaka Wasurenai); Lesson 51. "Life Moves On like a Conveyor Belt" (人生はベルトコンベアのように流れる, Jinsei wa Beruto Konbea no Yō ni Nagareru); Lesson 52. "Playgrounds Are for Kids" (公園は子供たちのものだ, Kōen wa Kodomo Tachi no Mono Da); Lesson 53. "Prayer Won't Make Your Worldly Desires Go Away! Control Yourself" (煩悩が鐘で消えるかァァ 己で制御しろ己で, Bonnō ga Kane de Kieru Kaaa Onore de Seigyo Shiro Onore de); Lesson 54. "Mistaking Someone's Name Is Rude!" (人の名前とか間違えるの失礼だ, Hito no Namae to ka Machigaeru no Shitsurei Da); Lesson 55. "Ramen Shops with Long Menus Never Do Well" (メニューが多いラーメン屋はたいてい流行っていない, Menyū ga Ōi Rāmen'ya wa Taitei Hayatteinai); Lesson 56. "Eating Ice Cream in Winter Is Awesome" (冬に食べるアイスもなかなかオツなもんだ, Fuyu ni Taberu Aisu mo Nakanaka Otsu na Mon Da); Lesson 57. "What's the Bonbon Mean in Whiskey Bonbon?" (ウイスキーボンボンのボンボンって何?, Uisukī Bonbon no Bonbon tte Nani?); Lesson 58. "Give a Thought to Planned Pregnancy" (子作りは計画的に, Kozukuri wa Keikaku Teki ni)
After being hit by a car, Gintoki starts suffering from a case of amnesia in which he is unable to remember his identity or friends. Finding his original self unreliable, Gintoki leaves Shinpachi and Kagura and starts working in a factory alongside a Kondo who also suffers from amnesia and the Shinsegumi spy Sagaru Yamazaki. Yamazaki is undercover searching what is the factory's owner, a terrorist, doing and soon discovers the objects they create are explosives. The terrorist is confronted by the Shinsengumi and Odd Jobs, with the latter coming to protect Gintoki. Gintoki is able to recover his memory and helps the Shinsengumi arrest the terrorist. In other chapters, Gintoki battles the ninja Zenzo Hattori for the last issue of the Weekly Shōnen Jump, Odd Jobs trick two aliens sent by Sakamoto to rebuild their house, and Katsura meets a woman named Ikumatsu while escaping from the Shinsengumi. In the last chapters, Kagura's father, an alien fighter named Umibouzu, comes to Edo to bring her daughter back home, and Gintoki tells her it is better for her to leave.
8	Just Slug Your Daughter's Boyfriend and Get It Over With; Musume no Kareshi wa Toriaezu Naguttoke (娘の彼氏はとりあえず殴っとけ)	August 4, 2005; 4-08-873844-6	September 2, 2008; 978-1-4215-1621-9
Lesson 59. "Always Knock Before Opening the Bathroom Door" (トイレに入るときはまずノック, Toire ni Hairu Toki wa Mazu Nokku); Lesson 60. "You Can't Judge a Movie by Its Title" (タイトルだけじゃ映画の面白さはわかんない, Taitoru Dake ja Eiga no Omoshirosa wa Wakannai); Lesson 61. "You Know What Happens If You Pee on a Worm" (みみずにおしっこかけると腫れるよ, Mimizu ni O Shikko Kakeru to Hareru yo); Lesson 62. "You Only Live with Your Father for About 20 Years... So Be Nice to Him!" (せいぜい一緒に過ごす期間なんて二十年くらいなんだから娘さんはお父さんを大切にしてあげて, Seizei Issho ni Sugosu Kikan Nante Ni Jū Nen Kurai Nanda kara Musume San wa O Tō San o Taisetsu ni Shiteagete); Lesson 63. "Just Slug Your Daughter's Boyfriend and Get It Over With" (娘の彼氏はとりあえず殴っとけ, Musume no Kareshi wa Toriaezu Naguttoke); Lesson 64. "Make Characters So Anybody Can Tell Who They Are by Just Their Silhouettes" (キャラクターはシルエットだけで読者に見分けがつくように描き分けよう, Kyarakutā wa Shiruetto Dake de Dokusha ni Miwake ga Tsuku Yō ni Kakiwakeyō); Lesson 65. "You Can't Judge a Person by His Appearance, Either" (外見だけで人を判断しちゃダメ, Gaiken Dake de Hito o Handan Shicha Dame); Lesson 66. "Do Cherries Come from Cherry Trees?" (さくらんぼってアレ桜の木になるの?, Sakuranbo tte Are Sakura no Ki ni Naru no?); Lesson 67. "Why Are Masochists So Tough?" (Mってある意味 無敵, Emu tte Aru Imi Muteki)
As Shinpachi tries to convince a saddened Kagura to stay, her ship is attacked by plant-like alien. Gintoki watches it in the news and sets to help her with Sadaharu, eventually allying with Umibouzu. After the Bakufu eliminate the alien, Umibouzu allows Kagura to stay in Earth. He reveals to Gintoki that the reason why he tried to make her leave as he was afraid she would be consumed by her clan's blood and attack other people like her older brother. In following chapters, the Shinsengumi are requested to make their client's daughter break up with her date, Odd Jobs meet the friendly alien Hedoro who accidentally scares all the neighborhood, and Elizabeth is kidnapped by an official, and Katsura asks Odd Jobs and Sachan to help him save her.
9	Whatever You Play, Play to Win! Kyabakura Asobi wa Hatachi ni Natte kara (キャバクラ遊びは20歳になってから)	October 4, 2005; 4-08-873864-0	November 4, 2008; 978-1-4215-1622-6
Lesson 68. "The Moon Knows Everything" (月は何でも知っている, Tsuki wa Nandemo Shitteiru); Lesson 69. "Mom's Busy Too, so Quit Complaining About What's for Dinner" (お母さんだって忙しいんだから夕飯のメニューに文句つけるの止めなさい, O Kā San Datte Isogashiinda kara Yūhan no Menyū ni Monku Tsukeru no Yamenasai); Lesson 70. "Life Without Gambling Is like Sushi Without Wasabi" (ギャンブルのない人生なんてわさび抜きの寿司みてぇなもんだ, Gyanburu no Nai Jinsei Nante Wasabi Nuki no Sushi Mitē na Mon Da); Lesson 71. "Stop Drinking While You Still Feel Good" (酒は気もちいい状態の内に止めておけ, Sake wa Kimochi Ii Jōtai no Uchi ni Yameteoke); Lesson 72. "Walk Your Dog at an Appropriate Speed" (愛犬の散歩は適度なスピードで, Aiken no Sanpo wa Tekido na Supīdo de); Lesson 73. "One Bark Is Sweeter than a Million Songs" (百万編の詩より一吠えのワン, Hyakumanben no Uta yori Hitohoe no Wan); Lesson 74. "Adults Only. We Wouldn't Want Anyone Immature in Here..." (キャバクラ遊びは20歳になってから, Kyabakura Asobi wa Hatachi ni Natte kara); Lesson 75. "The More You're Alike, the More You Fight" (似てる二人は喧嘩する, Niteru Futari wa Kenka Suru); Lesson 76. "Whatever You Play, Play to Win!" (何であれ やるからには負けちゃダメ, Nandeare Yaru kara ni wa Makecha Dame)
Yorozuya, Katsura and Sachan go to rescue Elizabeth and battle former Oniwabanshus hired to stop them. Although Gin's group wins, Elizabeth is revealed to have never been rescued as Katsura forgot about him. In the next chapters Gin and Hasegawa have gambling problems and have to work with another gambler to pay a debt to a casino's owner, Sadaharu becomes a demon forcing Yorozuya and its former owners to work together to restore its original form, Tae and Sadaharu's former owner compete to keep their jobs in their cabaret, an assassin tries to kill Hijikata but is bothered by his repeated fights with Gin, and the Yorozuya meet the ghost of the Oniwabanshu's master.
10	Even an Inch-long Insect Has a Soul; Issun no Mushi ni mo Gobu no Tamashii (一寸の虫にも五分の魂)	December 2, 2005; 4-08-873886-1	January 6, 2009; 978-1-4215-1623-3
Lesson 77. "Milk Should Be Served at Body Temperature" (ミルクは人肌の温度で, Miruku wa Hitohada no Ondo de); Lesson 78. "The Maid Saw Everything" (家政婦はやっぱり見てた, Kaseifu wa Yappari Miteta); Lesson 79. "If You Want to See Someone, Make an Appointment First" (人に会うときはまずアポを, Hito ni Au Toki wa Mazu Apo o); Lesson 80. "Always Show Up for a Date 30 Minutes Early" (デートは30分前行動で, Dēto wa San Jippun Mae Kōdō de); Lesson 81. "If You Go to Sleep with the Fan On, You'll Get a Stomachache, so Be Careful" (扇風機つけっぱなしで寝ちゃうとお腹こわしちゃうから気を付けて, Senpūki Tsukeppanashi de Nechau to O Naka Kowashichau kara Ki o Tsukete); Lesson 82. "Like a Haunted House, Life Is Filled with Horrors" (渡る世間はオバケばかり, Wataru Seken wa O Bake Bakari); Lesson 83. "Rhinoceros Beetles Teach Boys that Life Is Precious" (少年はカブト虫を通し生命の尊さを知る, Shōnen wa Kabuto Mushi o Tōshi Inochi no Tōtosa o Shiru); Lesson 84. "Even an Inch-long Insect Has a Soul" (一寸の虫にも五分の魂, Issun no Mushi ni mo Gobu no Tamashii); Lesson 85. "Even on the Net, Use at Least a Minimum of Courtesy" (ネットでも最低限のエチケットはもって, Netto demo Saiteigen no Echiketto wa Motte)
Gin finds an abandoned baby and goes to search for his mother. The Yorozuya meets the mother who is being haunted by her late husband's father who wishes to take the baby. Gin defeats the man's assassin, Nizo Okada, and returns the baby to his mother. In the two next one-shot chapters, Gin has to protect a fan-like machine from being used to destroy Edo and the Yorozuya try to scare people as part of a festival. In a three chapter story, the Yorozuya goes beetle hunting to be used in beetle rematch against Okita. Kagura finds the Shogun's lost beetle the Shinsengumi were searching and while trying to stop Kagura and Okita's beetle fight, Gin accidentally kills the Shogun's beetle. The last chapter has Shinpachi accidentally saving a girl from a accepting to go on a date with her.
11	To See the Sunrise; Hi wa Mata Noboru (陽はまた昇る)	February 3, 2006; 4-08-874017-3	March 3, 2009; 978-1-4215-2395-8
Lesson 86. "Love Doesn't Require a Manual" (恋にマニュアルなんていらない, Koi ni Manyuaru Nante Iranai); Lesson 87. "For the Wind Is the Life" (走り続けてこそ人生, Hashiritsuzukete Koso Jinsei); Lesson 88. "The Ideal Girlfriend Is Always Minami" (理想の彼女はやっぱり南ちゃん, Risō no Kanojo wa Yappari Minami Chan); Lesson 89. "Croquette Sandwiches Are Always the Most Popular Food Sold at the Stalls" (売店ではやっぱコロッケパンが一番人気, Baiten de wa Yappa Korokke Pan ga Ichiban Ninki); Lesson 90. "Misfortune Never Arrives Alone" (災難は続け様に降り掛かる, Sainan wa Tsuzukezama ni Furikakaru); Lesson 91. "The Full Moon Drives People Crazy" (満月は人を狂わせる, Mangetsu wa Hito wo Kuruwaseru); Lesson 92. "Be Careful Not to Forget Your Umbrella" (傘の置き忘れに注意, Kasa no Okiwasure ni Chūi); Lesson 93. "Fools and Villains Love High Places" (バカとワルは高い所がお好き, Baka to Waru wa Takai Tokoro ga O Suki); Lesson 94. "To See the Sunrise" (陽はまた昇る, Hi wa Mata Noboru)
Shinpachi's date turns out to be a thief who takes his belongings but his friends help him to stop her. In the next two chapters Gin helps a woman to accidentally deliver a bomb and Sachan has to assassin a doctor but her feelings for Gin who is hospitalized after the delivery cause her to make multiple mistakes. The rest chapters involve an arc in which Katsura is defeated by Nizo Okada and Elizabeth requests the Yorozuya's help to find him. Gin is also hired y the swordsmith Murata Tetsuya to find Nizo who was taken his biomechanical sword, Benizakura, but is severely wounded in his battle against Okada. Meanwhile, in her search for Katsura, Kagura is taken by Sadaharu to Shinsuke Takasugi's ship where his comrades from the Kiheitai imprison her. Shinpachi and Elizabeth find Kagura's location and Gintoki follows them with Tetsuya's sister, Tetsuko, after her brother allied with Takasugi in order to assist Nizo with Benizakura. Having survived to Nizo's attack, Katsura also infiltrates Takasugi's ship and confronts him.
12	The Longest Way Around Is the Shortest Way; Isogaba Maware (急がば回れ)	April 4, 2006; 4-08-874040-8	May 5, 2009; 978-1-4215-2396-5
Lesson 95. "On a Moonless Night, Insects Are Drawn to the Light" (闇夜の虫は光に集う, Yamiyo no Mushi wa Hikari ni Tsudou); Lesson 96. "The Longest Way Around Is the Shortest Way" (急がば回れ, Isogaba Maware); Lesson 97. "If You're Prepared, You Don't Need to Worry" (備えあれば憂い無し, Sonae Areba Urei Nashi); Lesson 98. "Even Mummy Hunters Sometimes Turn into Mummies" (ミイラ捕りがミイラに, Miira Tori ga Miira ni); Lesson 99. "People Who Say that Santa Doesn't Really Exist Actually Want to Believe in Him" (サンタなんていねーんだよって言い張る奴こそホントはいるって信じたいんだよ, Santa Nante Inēnda yo tte Iiharu Yatsu Koso Honto wa Iru tte Shinjitainda yo); Lesson 100. "A Shared Soup Pot Is a Microcosm of Life" (鍋は人生の縮図である, Nabe wa Jinsei no Shukuzu Dearu); Lesson 101. "Keep an Eye on the Chief for the Day" (一日局長に気を付けろッテンマイヤーさん, Ichi Nichi Kyokuchō ni Ki o Tsukero ttenmaiyā San); Lesson 102. "In Order to Be Myself" (僕が僕であるために, Boku ga Boku de Aru Tame ni); Lesson 103. "Only Children Play in the Snow" (雪ではしゃぐのは子供だけ, Yuki de Hashagu no wa Kodomo Dake)
Gin has his rematch with Nizo who is consumed by the Benizakura and Tetsuya is killed while trying to protect Tetsuko from the sword. Gin kills Nizo and escapes from the ship with his friends after he and Katsura announce Takasugi they will defeat him the next time they meet. In the next one-shot chapters Yamazaki is assigned the task of learning Gin's relationship with Katsura's group but has difficulties spying him due to the traps that Shinpachi's house has, Gin tries to help Santa Claus in delivering presents, and the Yorozuya compete in eating the New Year's food. In the next two chapter story the Shinsengumi have to protect the idol Terakado Tsu from the terrorist and the last one-shot chapter focuses on a snow sculpture contest the Yorozuya participate.
13	After All, Your Enemy of Yesterday Is Still Your Enemy Today; Kinō no Teki wa Kyō mo Nan'ya Kan'ya de Teki (昨日の敵は今日もなんやかんやで敵)	July 4, 2006; 4-08-874130-7	July 7, 2009; 978-1-4215-2397-2
Lesson 104. "All Mothers Are More or Less the Same" (どこの母ちゃんも大体同じ, Doko no Kā Chan mo Daitai Onaji); Lesson 105. "Don't Eat Too Much Kaki-Pi" (柿ピーはあんまり食べ過ぎちゃダメ, Kaki Pī wa Anmari Tabesugicha Dame); Lesson 106. "Don't Make Chomping Sounds When You Eat" (もの食べるときクチャクチャ音をたてない, Mono Taberu Toki Kuchakucha Oto o Tatenai); Lesson 107. "Men Have a Weakness for Girls Who Sell Flowers and Work in Pastry Shops" (花屋とかケーキ屋の娘に男は弱い, Hanaya to ka Kēkiya no Ko ni Otoko wa Yowai); Lesson 108. "Tasty Sticks Really Fill Your Stomach" (んまい棒は意外とお腹いっぱいになる, Nmai Bō wa Igai to O Naka Ippai ni Naru); Lesson 109. "Bread Is Better than the Song of Birds" (華より団子, Hana yori Dango); Lesson 110. "At Times like This, Don't Talk, Just Make Red Rice" (そういう時は黙って赤飯, Sō Iu Toki wa Damatte Sekihan); Lesson 111. "Watch the Sakata Family Show at 7:00 p.m. on Tuesdays at the Dinner Table" (火曜7時は坂田家を食卓で, Kayō Shichi Ji wa Sakata Ke o Shokutaku de); Lesson 112. "After All, Your Enemy of Yesterday Is Still Your Enemy Today" (昨日の敵は今日もなんやかんやで敵, Kinō no Teki wa Kyō mo Nan'ya Kan'ya de Teki)
The Yorozuya are hired by a woman to find her missing son who is supposed to be working in Kabuki-Cho. They find her son, Kyoshiro Honjo, who is running his own male host club, Takamagahara, and help him to protect the club from a group of bandits. In the next three one-shot chapters, Kagura replaces a sick Gin as Yorozuya's leader to find to investigate a man who appears to be unfaithful to his wife, Katsura has an interview with a TV reporter as he is tracked by the Shinsengumi and the Yorozuya participate in an eating contest to help a man with promoting his shop. The rest of the volume introduces a young samurai named Kyubei Yagyu from a noble family who was promised by Tae to get married. Although Tae decides to keep her promise Shinpachi and Kondo challenge the Yagyu family to meet her after having to see her cry. Gin, Kagura, Hijikata and Okita join them and they challenge the Yagyu's top four.
14	Four Heads Are Better than One; Yonin Soroeba Ironna Chie (四人揃えばいろんな知恵)	September 4, 2006; 4-08-874252-4	September 1, 2009; 978-1-4215-2398-9
Lesson 113. "Fragile: Handle with Care" (ワレモノ注意, Waremono Chūi); Lesson 114. "Blood and Bandages Are Kinda Cool. They're a Good Look" (血とか包帯って...なんかカッケー 憧れる, Chi to ka Hōtai tte... Nanka Kakkē Akogareru); Lesson 115. "People Who Are Picky About Food Are Also Picky About People" (食べ物の好き嫌い多い人は人間の好き嫌いも多い, Tabemono no Sukikirai Ōi Hito wa Ningen no Sukikirai mo Ōi); Lesson 116. "Don't Just Pick Up Anything You Find Left on the Street" (落ちてたからって何でも拾ってきちゃダメ, Ochiteta kara tte Nandemo Hirottekicha Dame); Lesson 117. "Do It Before You Do That" (やる前にやれ, Yaru Mae ni Yare); Lesson 118. "Four Heads Are Better than One" (四人揃えばいろんな知恵, Yonin Soroeba Ironna Chie); Lesson 119. "All Words Have Two Meanings" (言葉には裏がある, Kotoba ni wa Ura ga Aru); Lesson 120. "Everyone Makes Mistakes" (間違いは誰にでもある, Machigai wa Dare ni demo Aru); Lesson 121. "When Someone Who Wears Glasses Takes Them Off, It Looks like Something's Missing" (普段 眼鏡をかけてる奴が眼鏡を外すとなんかもの足りない パーツが一個足りない気がする, Fudan Megane o Kaketeru Yatsu ga Megane o Hazusu to Nanka Monotarinai Pātsu ga Ikko Tarinai Ki ga Suru)
Shinpachi's group splits to fight the Yagyu with Okita quickly defeating Sui Minato. Okita then joins Kagura in beating Tsukamu Nishino but the two wound each other during their arguments. Hijikata also manages to win his fight against Itsuki Kitaoji but suffers wounds and decides to make time for Shinpachi to find Tae while fights Kyubei. Meanwhile, Gin, Kondo, the last Yagyu Four, Aujumu Tojo and Yagyu's leader, Binbokusai Yagyu, are trapped in the bathroom with no toilet paper leaving them unable to start fighting. Kondo and Toyjo eventually battle with the former winning but Kondo wounds himself after using sandpaper to clean himself. Gin and Binbokusai sacrifice important papers to clean themselves and fight just as Shinpachi finds Tae. He learns that Kyubei is actually a girl raised as a male trying to protect Tae with her new strength. Shinpachi is still against accepting the marriage due to Kyubei not understanding Tae's feeling and joins Gin in the final fight against Bibokusai and Kyubei.
15	The Best Makeup for Women Is Their Smiles; Onna no Ichiban no Keshō wa Egao (女の一番の化粧は笑顔)	November 2, 2006; 4-08-874274-5	November 3, 2009; 978-1-4215-2399-6
Lesson 122. "Everybody Cares About Somebody" (誰もが誰かを想ってる, Daremo ga Dareka o Omotteru); Lesson 123. "The Best Makeup for Women Is Their Smiles" (女の一番の化粧は笑顔, Onna no Ichiban no Keshō wa Egao); Lesson 124. "You Can't Trust the Previews for Jump's Next Volume" (ジャンプの次号予告は当てにならない, Janpu no Jigō Yokoku wa Ate ni Naranai); Lesson 125. "Always Practice "What If" Driving" (かもしれない運転でいけ, Kamoshirenai Unten de Ike); Lesson 126. "Dogs' Paws Smell Crispy like Popcorn" (犬の肉球はこうばしい匂いがする, Inu no Nikukyū wa Kōbashii Nioi ga Suru); Lesson 127. "If You Sleep with the Air Conditioner On, You'll Catch a Cold" (クーラーはタイマーで切れるようにしてから寝ないと風邪ひくよ, Kūrā wa Taimā de Kireru Yō ni Shite kara Nenai to Kaze Hiku yo); Lesson 128. "Social Status Has Nothing to Do with Being Lucky" (運に身分は関係ない, Un ni Mibun wa Kankei Nai); Lesson 129. "When You're Too Absorbed in Counting Sheep, You End Up Not Sleeping Well" (羊数えるの自体に夢中になったりして結局 眠れないことも多い, Hitsuji Kazoeru no Jitai ni Muchū ni Nattari Shite Kekkyoku Nemurenai Koto mo Ōi); Lesson 130. "If You Eat Too Much Spicy Food, You'll Get Hemorrhoids" (辛いもんばっか食べてっと痔になるぞ, Karai Mon Bakka Tabetetto Ji ni Naru zo)
Shinpachi's group wins the fight against the Yagyu and the marriage is cancelled. However, Tae and Kyubei stay as friends with the latter wishing to stop being acting in a childish way and become stronger. In the next one-shot chapter Hattori befriends a child he was assigned to kidnap, Katsura takes a driving lessons to get a license and rent movies and Kagura tries to find a girlfriend for Sadaharu. The Yorozuya are also asked to work in Tae's bar and have to make the Shogun Shigeshige Tokugawa pass a good time. In the last two chapters Okita's older sister, Mitsuba, comes to Edo to prepare for her marriage. However, Mitsuba has a poor health and is expected to live for a short time. Hijikata learns that Mitsuba's fiance illegally trades weapons and decides to go to arrest him against Okita's wishes who hates Hijikata for attracting his sister in the past and rejecting her feelings.
16	German Suplex Any Woman Who Asks, "Which Is More Important, Me or Your Work?"; Watashi to Shigoto Dotchi ga Daiji na no to ka Iu Onna ni wa Jāman Sūpurekkusu (私と仕事どっちが大事なのとかいう女にはジャーマンスープレックス)	December 27, 2006; 4-08-874294-X	January 5, 2010; 978-1-4215-2814-4
Lesson 131. "Men Are Troublesome" (男ってメンドくさい, Otoko tte Mendo Kusai); Lesson 132. "German Suplex Any Woman Who Asks, "Which Is More Important, Me or Your Work?"" (私と仕事どっちが大事なのとかいう女にはジャーマンスープレックス, Watashi to Shigoto Dotchi ga Daiji na no to ka Iu Onna ni wa Jāman Sūpurekkusu); Lesson 133. "The Best Place to Hide a Tree Is in a Forest" (木を隠すなら森, Ki o Kakusu Nara Mori); Lesson 134. "A Manga Artist Is a Pro when He Has Built Up a Backlog of Manuscripts" (漫画家は原稿のストックが出来てこそ一人前, Mangaka wa Genkō no Sutokku ga Dekite Koso Ichininmae); Lesson 135. "Every Man Has a Hard-Boiled Egg for a Heart" (男は心に固ゆで卵, Otoko wa Kokoro ni Kata Yude Tamago); Lesson 136. "Even a Villain Could Be Somebody's Daddy" (悪人でも親は親, Akunin demo Oya wa Oya); Lesson 137. "A Hard-Boiled Egg Doesn't Get Crushed" (固ゆで卵は潰れない, Kata Yude Tamago wa Tsuburenai); Lesson 138. "You Can Get Almost Anything You Want at Loft" (ロフトにいけば大体何でもある, Rofuto ni Ikeba Daitai Nandemo Aru); Lesson 139. "A Blind Date Is Fun Until Just Before It Starts" (合コンは始まるまでが一番楽しい, Gōkon wa Hajimaru Made ga Ichiban Tanoshii)
As Mitsuba is hospitalized due to her poor health, Hijikata goes alone to arrest Mitsuba's fiance. Understanding that Hijikata did not want Mitsuba to suffer by his side, Okita goes to assist the Shinsengumi to stop the arm dealers and meets his sister in her last moments. In the next chapters, the people from Edo become zombies suspiciously similar to the main character from the series Kochira Katsushika-ku Kameari Kōen-mae Hashutsujo and the Yorozuya fight for their lives. Another story follows the Yorozuya meeting detective Heiji Kozenigata who hires them to help him capture a thief known as Fox. Although they capture the thief Kozenigata learns that Fox is actually a friend of him whom he frequents. The last two chapters have Tojo requesting the Yorozuya's help to make Kyubei be attracted to male after suspecting she wants a sex reassignment surgery. The Yorozuya, Tae, Katsura and Kondo make a gathering to attract Kyubei unaware that Tojo realizes he was wrong.
17	Only One Hour of Video Games per Day; Gēmu wa Ichi Nichi Ichi Jikan (ゲームは一日一時間)	March 2, 2007; 978-4-08-874327-1	March 2, 2010; 978-1-4215-2815-1
Lesson 140. "Please Cooperate in Separating the Trash" (ゴミの分別回収にご協力下さい, Gomi no Bunbetsu Kaishū ni Go Kyōryoku Kudasai); Lesson 141. "There Are No Save Points in Real Life" (人生にセーブポイントはない, Jinsei ni Sēbu Pointo wa Nai); Lesson 142. "Nothing Can Compete with a Woman's Tears" (女の涙に勝るものなし, Onna no Namida ni Masaru Mono Nashi); Lesson 143. "Too Much Cute Is Creepy" (可愛いモノも多すぎると気持ち悪い, Kawaii Mono mo Ōsugiru to Kimochi Warui); Lesson 144. "Western Songs Are Hard to Learn" (洋楽は皆うろ覚え, Yōgaku wa Minna Urooboe); Lesson 145. "People Who Say They're Doing It for the Sake of Another Are Mostly Doing It for Themselves" (誰々のためにとか言う奴は大抵自分のためだったりする, Daredare no Tame ni to ka Iu Yatsu wa Taitei Jibun no Tame Dattari Suru); Lesson 146. "Some Data Cannot Be Deleted" (消せないデータもある, Kesenai Dēta mo Aru); Lesson 147. "Only One Hour of Video Games per Day" (ゲームは一日一時間, Gēmu wa Ichi Nichi Ichi Jikan); Lesson 148. "Don't Spend Your Whole Day Off Playing Video Games" (休みだからってゲームばっかやっちゃダメ, Yasumi Dakara tte Gēmu Bakka Yatcha Dame)
18	Men, Be Dorks; Otoko Tachi yo Madao Deare (男達よマダオであれ)	May 2, 2007; 978-4-08-874354-7	May 4, 2010; 978-1-4215-2816-8
Lesson 149. "Life and Video Games Are Full of Bugs" (人生もゲームもバグだらけ, Jinsei mo Gēmu mo Bagu Darake); Lesson 150. "Disasters Come in Threes" (2度あることは3度ある, Ni Do Aru Koto wa San Do Aru); Lesson 151. "Even Heroes Have Problems" (ヒーローだって悩んでる, Hīrō Datte Nayaderu); Lesson 152. "Try to See People's Good Points Instead of the Bad" (人の短所を見るより長所を見つけられる人になれ, Hito no Tansho o Miru yori Chōsho o Mitsukerareru Hito ni Nare); Lesson 153. "When You're on a Train, Hold On to the Straps with Both Hands" (電車に乗るときは必ず両手を吊り革に, Densha ni Noru Toki wa Kanarazu Ryōte o Tsurikawa ni); Lesson 154. "Men, Be Dorks" (男達よマダオであれ, Otoko Tachi yo Madao Deare); Lesson 155. "Love Conquers All" (愛は勝つ, Ai wa Katsu); Lesson 156. "If You Want to Lose Weight, Move" (やせたいなら動け, Yasetai Nara Ugoke); Lesson 157. "If You Want to Lose Weight, Don't Eat" (やせたいなら食べるな, Yasetai Nara Taberuna)
19	A Schemer Gets Caught in His Own Scheme; Sakushi Saku ni Oboreru (策士 策に溺れる)	August 3, 2007; 978-4-08-874399-8	August 4, 2010; 978-1-4215-2817-5
Lesson 158. "Most New Things Have Too Many Functions" (最近のは色々機能つきすぎ, Saikin no wa Iroiro Kinō Tsukisugi); Lesson 159. "Rules Are Meant to Be Broken" (掟は破るためにこそある, Rūru wa Yaburu Tame ni Koso Aru); Lesson 160. "Otaku Are Very Talkative" (オタクは話し好き, Otaku wa Hanashizuki); Lesson 161. "True Fanatics Need Three Each" (マニアは三つ欲しい, Mania wa Mittsu Hoshii); Lesson 162. "There's a Fine Line Between One's Good Points and Bad Points" (長所と短所は紙一重, Chōsho to Tansho wa Kami Hitoe); Lesson 163. "A Uniform Makes You Look 20 Percent Better" (制服は二割増し, Seifuku wa Ni Wari Mashi); Lesson 164. "Don't Play on the Railroad Tracks" (線路で遊んじゃいけません, Senro de Asonja Ikemasen); Lesson 165. "A Schemer Gets Caught in His Own Scheme" (策士 策に溺れる, Sakushi Saku ni Oboreru); Lesson 166. "Important Things Are Hard to See" (大切なものは見えにくい, Taisetsu na Mono wa Mienikui)
20	The Best Part of Summer Vacation Is Before It Begins; Natsuyasumi wa Hajimaru Mae ga Ichiban Tanoshii (夏休みは始まる前が一番楽しい)	October 4, 2007; 978-4-08-874424-7	November 3, 2010; 978-1-4215-2818-2
Lesson 167. "Listen to What Other People Say to You" (人の話をちゃんと聞け, Hito no Hanashi o Chanto Kike); Lesson 168. "Rhythm and Timing Are Useful in Any Endeavor" (何事もノリとタイミング, Nanigoto mo Nori to Taimingu); Lesson 169. "Unlikable Things Are Adorable" (好かれないものほど愛おしい, Sukarenai Mono Hodo Itōshii); Lesson 170. "What You Don't Know Can't Hurt You" (知らぬが仏, Shiranu ga Hotoke); Lesson 171. "A Man Must Never Give Up" (男なら諦めるな, Otoko Nara Akirameruna); Lesson 172. "I Hate Myself Because I Almost Always Leave My Umbrella Somewhere" (ほぼ100%の確率でビニール傘を置き忘れてくる自分が嫌い, Hobo Hyaku Pāsento no Kakuritsu de Binīru Gasa o Okiwasuretekuru Jibun ga Kirai); Lesson 173. "Life Is a Test" (人生は試験だ, Jinsei wa Shiken Da); Lesson 174. "The Best Part of Summer Vacation Is Before It Begins" (夏休みは始まる前が一番楽しい, Natsuyasumi wa Hajimaru Mae ga Ichiban Tanoshii); Lesson 175. "It's Important to Spend a Little Time Alone" (一人の時間も大事, Hitori no Jikan mo Daiji)

=== Volumes 21–40 ===
No.	Title	Original release date	English release date
21	Go Straight Even If You're Bent with Age; Koshi wa Magattemo Massugu ni (腰は曲がってもまっすぐに)	December 4, 2007; 978-4-08-874445-2	February 1, 2011; 978-1-4215-2819-9
Lesson 176. "Age Brings Wisdom" (亀の甲より年の功, Kame no Kō yori Toshi no kō); Lesson 177. "Going Strong Despite Your Age" (老いてなお盛ん, Oite Nao Sakan); Lesson 178. "When the Kids' Summer Vacation Begins, Adults Get Excited Too" (子供の夏休みが始まると大人も何かワクワクする, Kodomo no Natsuyasumi ga Hajimaru to Otona mo Nanka Wakuwaku Suru); Lesson 179. "Beauty Is like a Summer Fruit" (美は夏の果実の如き物, Bi wa Natsu no Kajitsu no Gotoki Mono); Lesson 180. "Go Straight Even If You're Bent with Age" (腰は曲がってもまっすぐに, Koshi wa Magattemo Massugu ni); Lesson 181. "A Man Should Drink Sake Alone While Gazing at the Moon" (男は一人で月見酒, Otoko wa Hitori de Tsukimizake); Lesson 182. "Flowers on Dead Wood" (枯れ木に花, Kareki ni Hana); Lesson 183. "She's Happiest When She's Working" (起きて働く果報者, Okite Hataraku Kahōmono); Lesson 184. "Children Don't Know How Their Parents Feel" (親の心 子知らず, Oya no Kokoro Ko Shirazu)
22	Always Keep a Screwdriver in Your Heart; Itsumo Kokoro ni Ippon no Doraibā (いつも心に一本のドライバー)	February 4, 2008; 978-4-08-874475-9	May 3, 2011; 978-1-4215-2820-5
Lesson 185. "Some Things Are Better Left Unsaid" (言わぬが花, Iwanu ga Hana); Lesson 186. "Return the Things You Borrowed" (借りたものは返せ, Karita Mono wa Kaese); Lesson 187. "If You Take a Plate, Don't Put It Back" (一度取った皿は戻さない, Ichi Do Totta Sara wa Modosanai); Lesson 188. "Scrubbing a Toilet Is Polishing Your Soul" (便器を磨く事これ心を磨く事なり, Benki o Migaku Koto Kore Kokoro o Migaku Koto Nari); Lesson 189. "Standard and Phillips Are Enough for Amateurs" (素人はプラスとマイナスだけで十分だ, Shirōto wa Purasu to Mainasu Dake de Jūbun Da); Lesson 190. "Imagination Is Cultivated in the Eighth Grade" (想像力は中2で培われる, Sōzōryoku wa Chū Ni de Tsuchikawareru); Lesson 191. "Video Game Success Is Inversely Related to Real World Success" (現実とネットゲームのパラメーターは反比例する, Genjitsu to Netto Gēmu no Paramētā wa Hanpirei Suru); Lesson 192. "Always Keep a Screwdriver in Your Heart" (いつも心に一本のドライバー, Itsumo Kokoro ni Ippon no Doraibā); Lesson 193. ""Prison Break, Season 2," What? The Prison Is Already Broken? Then It's No Longer a "Prison Break," Is It?" (『プリズンブレイク シーズン2』ってアレもうプリズンをブレイクしてるからプリズンブレイクじゃなくね?, Purizun Bureiku Shīzun Tsū tte Are Mō Purizun o Bureiku Shiteru kara Purizun Bureiku Janakune?)
23	People Almost Always Get into Fights on Trips; Ryokō Saki de wa Daitai Kenka Suru (旅行先ではだいたいケンカする)	April 4, 2008; 978-4-08-874496-4	August 2, 2011; 978-1-4215-2821-2
Lesson 194. "Everyone is an escapee of a gaol called "myself"." (人は皆 自分という檻を破る脱獄囚, Hito wa Mina Jibun to Iu Ori o Yaburu Datsugokushū); Lesson 195. "Let's have a chat about the past" (時には昔の話をしようか, Toki ni wa Mukashi no Hanashi o Shiyō ka); Lesson 196. "People Almost Always Get into Fights on Trips" (旅行先ではだいたいケンカする, Ryokō Saki de wa Daitai Kenka Suru); Lesson 197. "Silver and the good for nothing of his highness." (銀と閣下の穀潰し, Gin to Kakka no Gokutsubushi); Lesson 198. "The line under your briefs is absolutely inescapable." (ブリーフのウン筋は絶対不可避, Burīfu no Unsuji wa Zettai Fukahi); Lesson 199. "It Sure is Fun to Draw in The Deformed Style" (ディフォルメだと色塗るのが楽, Diforume Da to Iro Nuru no ga Raku); Lesson 200. "Oh, It's Chapter 200 Now? Don't Worry About It" (二百回とか気にしないでいこうか, Ni Hyakkai to ka Ki ni Shinaide Ikō ka); Lesson 201. "Rest For a Ghost is at Their Discretion" (幽霊ネタやる時は慎重に, Yūrei Neta Yaru Toki wa Shinchō ni); Lesson 202. "A cigarette box with only two cigarettes in it smells a lot like a guy who walks into a room with the scent of horse dung." (タバコは一箱に一、二本馬糞みたいな匂いのする奴が入っている, Tabako wa Hitohako ni Ichi, Ni Hon Bafun Mitai na Nioi no Suru Yatsu ga Haitteiru)
24	There Are Things Which You Won't Understand Even If You Met Each Other; Attemo Wakaranai Koto mo Aru (会ってもわからないこともある)	July 4, 2008; 978-4-08-874524-4	—
Lesson 203. "There Are Some Things Words Cannot Express" (文字でしか伝わらないものがある, Moji de Shika Tsutawaranai Mono ga Aru); Lesson 204. "That face has been decided on!!" (文字だけじゃ伝わらないものもある, Moji Dake ja Tsutawaranai Mono mo Aru); Lesson 205. "There are things that you won't understand without meeting each other." (会わないとわからないこともある, Awanai to Wakaranai Koto mo Aru); Lesson 206. "There Are Things Which You Won't Understand Even If You Met Each Other." (会ってもわからないこともある, Attemo Wakaranai Koto mo Aru); Lesson 207. "Be Careful of What You Pick Up and Eat" (拾い食いに気をつけろ, Hiroigui ni Ki o Tsukero); Lesson 208. "Cat Owners and Dog Owners Never See Eye to Eye" (猫好きと犬好きは相容れない, Nekozuki to Inuzuki wa Aiirenai); Lesson 209. "Need energy? Leave it to booze" (酒の勢いに任せるな, Sake no Ikioi ni Makaseruna); 13 (13 サーティーン, Sātīn)
25	Using two-page spreads is so Jump-like; Mihiraki o Tsukau to Janpu ppoi (見開きを使うとジャンプっぽい)	September 4, 2008; 978-4-08-874564-0	—
Lesson 210. "Don't put your wallet in your back pocket." (財布は尻ポケットに入れるな, Saifu wa Ketsu Poketto ni Ireruna); Lesson 211. "Pretty roses can come from the thorniest of bushes." (綺麗な薔薇には棘がある, Kirei na Bara ni wa Toge ga Aru); Lesson 212. "Beware of guys who use umbrellas on sunny days." (晴れの日に雨傘さす奴には御用心, Hare no Hi ni Amagasa Sasu Yatsu ni wa Go Yōjin); Lesson 213. "Using two page spreads is so Jump-like." (見開きを使うとジャンプっぽい, Mihiraki o Tsukau to Janpu ppoi); Lesson 214. "Business transactions come before struggles to the death" (決闘前には用を足せ, Kettō Mae ni wa Yō o Tase); Lesson 215. "It's dangerous to interrupt a fight." (ケンカの横槍は危険, Kenka no Yokoyari wa Kiken); Lesson 216. "There are plenty of guys who think that "little breasts" are "pretty breasts", Rambo isn't reckless, and that "buddy" and "ah, a wart" don't sound the same" (微乳と美乳を同じだと思ってる奴が多いけれどもランボーと乱暴くらい違うからね「相棒」と「あっ疣」くらい違うからね, Binyū to Binyū o Onaji Da to Omotteru Yatsu ga Ōi Keredo mo Ranbō to Ranbō Kurai Chigau kara ne Aibō to A' Ibo Kurai Chigau kara ne); Lesson 217. "Life's all about choosing the right footing." (人生は選択肢の連続, Jinsei wa Sentakushi no Renzoku); Lesson 218. "Only Mommy can stop siblings from fighting." (兄妹喧嘩を止められるのは母ちゃんだけ, Kyōdai Genka o Tomerareru no wa Kā Chan Dake)
26	Booze tastes a bit different during the day Hiruma ni Nomu Sake wa Hitoaji Chigau (昼間に飲む酒は一味違う)	December 4, 2008; 978-4-08-874591-6	—
Lesson 219. "People who say "I'm really getting angry" are in fact not angry at all". (「マジキレそうだわ」を多用する奴はまずキレない, Maji Kiresō Da wa o Tayō Suru Yatsu wa Mazu Kirenai); Lesson 220. "It's the supervillain types who have the best smiles" (腹黒い奴程 笑顔がキレイ, Haraguroi Yatsu Hodo Egao ga Kirei); Lesson 221. "There is no night without dawn." (明けない夜はない, Akenai Yoru wa Nai); Lesson 222. "Standing four legged is beastlike, while standing two legged in a show of bravado is man." (四本足で立つのが獣 二本足と意地と見栄で立つのが男, Yon Hon Ashi de Tatsu no ga Kemono Ni Hon Ashi to Iji to Mie de Tatsu no ga Otoko); Lesson 223. "Don't draw confidence from bedtime stories" (寝物語は信用するな, Nemonogatari wa Shin'yō Suruna); Lesson 224. "Women who turn tricks are not to be trusted" (水商売の女は信用するな, Mizu Shōbai no Onna wa Shin'yō Suruna); Lesson 225. "Burning a perm doesn't change it" (天然パーマは燃えても変わらない, Tennen Pāma wa Moetemo Kawaranai); Lesson 226. "Spread your arms wide enough and they'll fade into the distance" (手をのばす程に遠くなる, Te o Nobasu Hodo ni Tōkunaru); Lesson 227. "Various people bring about various bonds" (絆の色は十人十色, Kizuna no Iro wa Jūnin Toiro); Lesson 228. "Booze tastes a bit different during the day." (昼間に飲む酒は一味違う, Hiruma ni Nomu Sake wa Hitoaji Chigau)
27	Heavenly beings' superiors are the ones who created topknots Ten wa Hito no Ue ni Hito o Tsukurazu Mage o Tsukurimashita (天は人の上に人をつくらず髷をつくりました)	February 4, 2009; 978-4-08-874629-6	—
Lesson 229. "All adults are all children's instructors." (全ての大人達は全ての子供達のインストラクター, Subete no Otona Tachi wa Subete no Kodomo Tachi no Insutorakutā); Lesson 230. "You gotta get up and make your own crib." (己の居場所は己で作るものなり, Onore no Ibasho wa Onore de Tsukuru Mono Nari); Lesson 231. "Gossip born in the barbershop is among the world's most pointless." (床屋で交わされる店員との会話は世界で一番どうでもいい, Tokoya de Kawasareru Ten'in to no Kaiwa wa Sekai de Ichiban Dō demo Ii); Lesson 232. "Heavenly beings' superiors are the ones who created topknots." (天は人の上に人をつくらず髷をつくりました, Ten wa Hito no Ue ni Hito o Tsukurazu Mage o Tsukurimashita); Lesson 233. "Zippers should be undone with care." (チャックはゆっくり引きあげろ, Chakku wa Yukkuri Hikiagero); Lesson 234. "Bad guys sleep more often" (悪い奴程よく眠る, Warui Yatsu Hodo Yoku Nemuru); Lesson 235. "When your half eaten popsicle starts sliding down the stick, that's when jerks come around hoping for a share" (チューペットを二つに分ける時はあの持つトコある奴の方がなんかイイ あそこから飲むのもオツ, Chūpetto o Futatsu ni Wakeru Toki wa Ano Motsu Toko Aru Yatsu no Hō ga Nanka Ii Asoko kara Nomu no mo Otsu); Lesson 236. "Usually, Birthday gatherings turn into unwanted reunions" (誕生日会はいつものアイツが違う奴に見える, Tanjōbi Kai wa Itsumo no Aitsu ga Chigau Yatsu ni Mieru); Lesson 237. "Don't let sleeping children lie" (寝る子は育つ, Neru Ko wa Sodatsu)
28	It takes subtle amounts of courage to sneak into a shopping cart Yatai ni Hairu ni wa Bimyō ni Yūki ga Iru (屋台に入るには微妙に勇気がいる)	April 3, 2009; 978-4-08-874650-0	—
Lesson 238. "It takes subtle amounts of courage to sneak into a shopping cart" (屋台に入るには微妙に勇気がいる, Yatai ni Hairu ni wa Bimyō ni Yūki ga Iru); Lesson 239. "Guys need a battlefield to feel complete" (男が揃えばどんな場所でも戦場になる, Otoko ga Soroeba Donna Basho demo Senjō ni Naru); Lesson 240. "Be sure to take your infected friends to a hospital" (友達がケガしたらすぐに病院へ, Tomodachi ga Kega Shitara Sugu ni Byōin e); Lesson 241. "When in a cardboad box one bad apple ruins the bunch" (みかんは一個腐るといつの間にかダンボール中のみかんを腐らせる, Mikan wa Ikko Kusaru to Itsu no Ma ni ka Danbōru Jū no Mikan o Kusaraseru); Lesson 242. "If it looks like a foreigner it's a foreigner, if it looks like an alien, it's an alien." (外国人から見たらこっちも外国人 宇宙人から見たらこっちも宇宙人, Gaikokujin kara Mitara Kotchi mo Gaikokujin Uchūjin kara Mitara Kotchi mo Uchūjin); Lesson 243. "Laputa's still good after seeing it so many times" (何回見てもラピュタはいい, Nankai Mitemo Rapyuta wa Ii); Lesson 244. "Love often become cruelty" (愛とは無償のものなり, Ai to wa Mushō no Mono Nari); Lesson 245. "Even a black boat looks flashy when it sinks" (黒船は沈む時も派手, Kurofune wa Shizumu Toki mo Hade); Lesson 246. "There's loads of dirt under the willow tree" (柳の下にどじょうは沢山いる, Yanagi no Shita ni Dojō wa Takusan Iru)
29	Get caught up in the spider's web, and you'll be hard pressed to escape Yoru no Kumo wa Engi ga Warui (夜の蜘蛛は縁起が悪い)	July 3, 2009; 978-4-08-874699-9	—
Lesson 247. "Smooth polygons smooth out a human's heart" (なめらかなポリゴンは人の心もなめらかにする, Nameraka na Porigon wa Hito no Kokoro mo Nameraka ni Suru); Lesson 248. "A Person's Body is a Microuniverse" (人の身体は小宇宙, Hito no Karada wa Shōuchū); Lesson 249. "There are always two guys in a party of warriors that essentially do the same thing" (パーティーに勇者が二人いるとメダパニと同じ効果がある, Pātī ni Yūsha ga Futari Iru to Medapani to Onaji Kōka ga Aru); Lesson 250. "Idiots lead idiots" (導かれしバカたち, Michibikareshi Baka Tachi); Lesson 251. "And then, towards a legend..." (そして伝説へ, Soshite Densetsu e); Lesson 252. "A dangerous scent...." (アメとムチは使いよう, Ame to Muchi wa Tsukaiyō); Lesson 253. "A tasty situation indeed!!" (人は閉じこめられると自分の中の扉が開く, Hito wa Tojikomerareru to Jibun no Naka no Tobira ga Hiraku); Lesson 254. "As there is light, there is radiance." (夜の蜘蛛は縁起が悪い, Yoru no Kumo wa Engi ga Warui); Lesson 255. "Get caught up in the spider's web, and you'll be hard pressed to escape" (蜘蛛の糸は一度絡まるとなかなかとれない, Kumo no Ito wa Ichi Do Karamaru to Nakanaka Torenai)
30	The size of someone's areola and their height are always proportionate Nyūrin no Dekasa to Ningen no Dekasa wa Hirei Suru (乳輪のデカさと人間のデカさは比例する)	September 4, 2009; 978-4-08-874728-6	—
Lesson 256. "Beautiful people get boring after 3 minutes, ugly people you can live with forever" (美人は3分で飽きるがブサイクは永久不滅, Bijin wa Sanbun de Akiru Ga Busaiku wa Eikyū Fumetsu); Lesson 257. "A single thread can cause a fire" (糸一本火事の元, Ito Ippon Kaji no Moto); Lesson 258. "Instead of leaving before students, teachers should leave together with them" (師は先に往く者ではなく共に往く者, Shi wa Saki ni Yuku Mono Dewanaku Tomo ni Yuku Mono); Lesson 259. "There's hell to pay when someone like an irresponsible guy gets angry" (チャランポランな奴ほど怒ると恐い, Charanporan na Yatsu Hodo Okoru to Kowai); Lesson 260. "The important things are usually the heaviest burdens" (大切な荷ほど重く背負い難い, Taisetsu na Ni Hodo Omoku Seoigatai); Lesson 261. "When the time comes, pay back what you owe" (恩返しは気づいた時にやっておけ, Ongaeshi wa Kizuita Toki ni Yatteoke); Lesson 262. "Be warned, drink and women don't mix" (酒と女はワンセットで気をつけろ, Sake to Onna wa Wan Setto de Ki o Tsukero); Lesson 263. "No matter how old you are, going to the dentist is hard" (幾つになっても歯医者は嫌, Ikutsu ni Nattemo Haisha wa Iya); Lesson 264. "The size of someone's areola and their height are always proportionate" (乳輪のデカさと人間のデカさは比例する, Nyūrin no Dekasa to Ningen no Dekasa wa Hirei Suru)
31	Things Like Character Polls Should Fuck Off; Ninki Tōhyō Nante Kuso Kurae (人気投票なんて糞食らえ)	November 4, 2009; 978-4-08-874749-1	—
Lesson 265. "Things Like Character Polls Should Fuck Off" (人気投票なんて糞食らえ, Ninki Tōhyō Nante Kuso Kurae); Lesson 266. "Things Like Character Polls Should Be Burnt To Ash" (人気投票なんて燃えて灰になれ, Ninki Tōhyō Nante Moete Hai ni Nare); Lesson 267. "Things Like Character Polls If Made Into Tofu and Used To Hit Someone's Head Would Cause Comminuted Fractures" (人気投票なんて豆腐の角に頭をぶつけて粉砕骨折しろ, Ninki Tōhyō Nante Tōfu no Kado ni Atama o Butsukete Funsai Kossetsu Shiro); Lesson 268. "Things Like Character Polls..." (人気投票なんて・・・, Ninki Tōhyō Nante...); Lesson 269. "The Saying That Bee Stings Go Away When You Piss On Them Is Just a Superstition. In Reality It's Just A Great Way To Get Germs, So Be Careful!!" (蜂に刺されたら小便かけろってアレは迷信です バイ菌が入るから気をつけようね!!, Hachi ni Sasaretara Shōben Kakero tte Are wa Meishin Desu Baikin ga Hairu kara Ki o Tsukeyō ne!!); Lesson 270. "Watch Out For Death Flags" (死亡フラグに気をつけろ, Shibō Furagu ni Ki o Tsukero); Lesson 271. "There Are Things That No Matter How Dirty They Are, Have To Be Exposed" (汚れても護らなければいけないものがある, Yogoretemo Mamoranakereba Ikenai Mono ga Aru); Lesson 272. "When the Flag Waves, It's Goodbye" (フラグを踏んだらサヨウナラ, Furagu o Fundara Sayōnara); Lesson 273. "Radio Physical Fitness Shows Are How Boys and Girls Build Stable Social Relationships" (ラジオ体操は少年少女の社交場, Rajio Taisō wa Shōnen Shōjo no Shakōba)
32	Kabukichō Stray cat Blues; Kabukichō Nora Neko Burūsu (かぶき町野良猫ブルース)	January 4, 2010; 978-4-08-874785-9	—
Lesson 274. "Stick with your Observation Diaries until the very end" (観察日記は最後までやりきろう, Kansatsu Nikki wa Saigo made Yarikirō); Lesson 275. "When looking for something, search from its point of view" (捜しものをする時はそいつの目線になって捜せ, Sagashimono o Suru Toki wa Soitsu no Mesen ni Natte Sagase); Lesson 276. "Shimura's Behind Yoooou!"... huh? I didn't realise it really is Shimura!!" (「志村うしろォォォ」ってアレホントは志村気づいてんだぜ!!, Shimura Ushiroooo 'tte Are Honto wa Shimura Kizuitenda ze!!); Lesson 277. "Freedom isn't living without rules, it's just living by your own rules" (自由とは無法ではなく己のルールで生きること, Jiyū to wa Muhō Dewanaku Onore no Rūru de Ikiru Koto); Lesson 278. "Pussies and their tails have some sort of use" (猫と尻尾は使いよう, Baka to Shippo wa Tsukaiyō); Lesson 279. "Kabukichō Stray cat Blues" (かぶき町野良猫ブルース, Kabukichō Nora Neko Burūsu); Lesson 280. "Cooking is Willpower" (料理は根性, Ryōri wa Konjō); Lesson 281. "Whenever I hear "Leviathan" I think of Sazae-san... I'm an idiot!!" (リヴァイアサンってきいたらどうしてもサザエさんがチラつく俺のバカ!!, Rivaiasan tte Kiitara Dōshitemo Sazae San ga Chiratsuku Ore no Baka!!); Lesson 282. "Unbeaten by rain," (雨ニモ負ケズ, Ame ni mo Makezu)
33	I want to become someone that beautiful and strong... Sonna Tsuyoku Utsukushii Mono ni Watashi wa Naritai (ソンナ強ク美シイモノニ私ハナリタイ)	April 2, 2010; 978-4-08-870021-2	—
Lesson 283. "Unbeaten by wind," (風ニモ負ケズ, Kaze ni mo Makezu); Lesson 284. "Unbeaten by storms," (嵐ニモ負ケズ, Arashi ni mo Makezu); Lesson 285. "Unbeaten by spears," (槍ニモ負ケズ, Yari ni mo Makezu); Lesson 286. "Unbeaten by meteorites," (隕石ニモ負ケズ, Inseki ni mo Makezu); Lesson 287. "Unbeaten by demonic heretics," (天魔外道ニモ負ケズ, Tenma Gedō ni mo Makezu); Lesson 288. "Whose smile can never be eradicated," (イカナル時ニモ笑顔ヲ絶ヤサナイ, Ikanaru Toki ni mo Egao o Tayasanai); Lesson 289. "I want to become someone that beautiful and strong..." (ソンナ強ク美シイモノニ私ハナリタイ, Sonna Tsuyoku Utsukushii Mono ni Watashi wa Naritai); Lesson 290. "The Red on Santa Is Probably Blood" (サンタクロースの赤は血の色, Santa Kurōsu no Aka wa Chi no Iro); Lesson 291. "What Santa Delivers Is Not Limited To Presents" (サンタが届けるはプレゼントではなく夢, Santa ga Todokeru wa Purezento Dewanaku Yume)
34	Outrageous Cities Are Full of Gathering Places For Yahoo Type Guys; Muhō no Machi ni Tsudou wa Kyahhō na Yatsu Bakari (無法の街に集うはキャッホーな奴ばかり)	April 30, 2010; 978-4-08-870047-2	—
Lesson 292. "All of Humanity is Santa" (人類みなサンタ, Jinrui Mina Santa); Lesson 293. "Think About Balance in Your Meals" (食事はバランスを考えろ, Shokuji wa Baransu o Kangaero); Lesson 294. "Do New Years Cards With Calligraphy Pens" (年賀状は筆ペンでいけ, Nenga Jō wa Fude Pen de Ike); Lesson 295. "Cocoa Before Hearts" (カカオよりココロ, Kakao yori Kokoro); Lesson 296. "The Poster Board Store's Poster Girl Has Enough Trouble With Two Place Cards" (看板屋の看板娘はもう面倒なんで二枚の板と呼べ, Kanban'ya no Kanban Musume wa Mō Mendō Nande Ni Mai no Ita to Yobe); Lesson 297. "Outrageous Cities Are Full of Gathering Places For Yahoo Type Guys" (無法の街に集うはキャッホーな奴ばかり, Muhō no Machi ni Tsudou wa Kyahhō na Yatsu Bakari); Lesson 298. "Trash That Is Mixed Together Will Stink" (ゴミに交われば臭くなる, Gomi ni Majiwareba Kusakunaru); Lesson 299. "When Were Odagiri Joe's Hairdo and Shenmue's Continuation Sales Decided?" (オダギリジョーの髪型とシェンムーの続編発売はいつになったら決定するんですか, Odagiri Jō no Kamigata to Shenmū no Zokuhen Hatsubai wa Itsu ni Nattara Kettei Surundesu ka); Lesson 300. "Ghosts Aren't The Only Ones Who Go Crazy In Graveyards" (墓場で暴れるのは幽霊だけでない, Hakaba de Abareru no wa Yūrei Dake Denai)
35	How Do You Do!! O Hikaenasutte!! (お控えなすって!!)	August 4, 2010; 978-4-08-870086-1	—
Lesson 301. "It's a Youngster's Responsibility to Watch Over the Elderly Until Death, and the Elder's Job to Watch Over Youngsters as They Live" (若者の務めは老人の死を看とること 老人の務めは若者の生を看とること, Wakamono no Tsutome wa Rōjin no Shi o Mitoru Koto Rōjin no Tsutome wa Wakamono no Sei o Mitoru Koto); Lesson 302. "The Chains of Men" (侠の鎖, Otoko no Kusari); Lesson 303. "Bonds That Can't Be Cut By 30 Volumes' Worth of Enemies" (30巻あいても切れない絆, San Jū Kan Aite mo Kirenai Kizuna); Lesson 304. "Town of Iron" (鉄の街, Tetsu no Machi); Lesson 305. "When an Old Man and a Young Girl Get Together, All Kinds of Creativity Abound" (ジジイと若い女が一緒にいると何か色々想像力が増す, Jijii to Wakai Onna ga Issho ni Iru to Nanika Iroiro Sōzōryoku ga Masu); Lesson 306. "Stubborn, Impudent, Determined and Inflexible" (しぶとくずぶとくしたたかにしなやかに, Shibutoku Zubutoku Shitataka ni Shinayaka ni); Lesson 307. "Battle of the Noble Monkeys" (猿公達の闘い, Etekō Tachi no Tatakai); Lesson 308. "The Pipe and the Jitte" (煙管と十手, Kiseru to Jitte); Lesson 309. "How Do You Do!!" (お控えなすって!!, O Hikaenasutte!!)
36	Jugem; Jugemu (寿限無)	October 4, 2010; 978-4-08-870111-0	—
Lesson 310. "This Wonderful World Is Full of Bastards" (悪党だらけの この素晴らしき世界, Akutō Darake no Kono Subarashiki Sekai); Lesson 311. "Odd or Even?" (丁か半か, Chō ka Han ka); Lesson 312. "Difficult to Command Super Secret Techniques Won't Work" (超必殺技はコマンド難すぎて出せない, Chō Hissatsu Waza wa Komando Muzusugite Dasenai); Lesson 313. "We Are All Soldiers in the War Against Fate..." (人は皆運命と戦う戦士, Hito wa Mina Unmei to Tatakau Senshi); Lesson 314. "Jugem" (寿限無, Jugemu); Lesson 315. "Names and Natures Often Match" (名は体を表す, Na wa Tai o Arawasu); Lesson 316. "It's Surprising the People You Meet For the First Time at a Funeral" (葬式って初めていくと意外とみんな明るくてビックリする, Sōshiki tte Hajimete Iku to Igai to Minna Akarukute Bikkuri Suru); Lesson 317. "You Should Watch the Ukon Tea Twice When Possible" (ウコン茶は二度見してしまう, Ukon Cha wa Nidomi Shiteshimau); Lesson 318. "Glasses Are a Part of the Soul" (メガネは魂の一部です, Megane wa Kokoro no Ichi Bu Desu)
37	People Grow Up So Much During Summer Vacation; Natsuyasumi Ake wa Minna Chotto Otona ni Mieru (夏休みあけは皆ちょっと大人に見える)	December 3, 2010; 978-4-08-870145-5	—
Lesson 319. "Z~~" (Z～～～～～～～, Zī～～～～～～～); Lesson 320. "Annihilation VS Lethal Strike" (滅殺VS必殺, Messatsu Bāsasu Hissatsu); Lesson 321. "There are Things That You Can't See, Even with Glasses on" (メガネじゃ見えないものがある, Megane ja Mienai Mono ga Aru); Lesson 322. "Twice, Three Times That There Are" (二度あることは三度ある, Ni Do Aru Koto wa San Do Aru); Lesson 323. "You Can't Say Pool Without Porori" (プールといったらポロリ, Pūru to Ittara Porori); Lesson 324. "People Grow Up So Much During Summer Vacation" (夏休みあけは皆ちょっと大人に見える, Natsuyasumi Ake wa Minna Chotto Otona ni Mieru); Lesson 325. "Everyone Seems So Grown Up After Winter Vacation" (冬休みあけも皆けっこう大人に見える, Fuyuyasumi Ake mo Minna Kekkō Otona ni Mieru); Lesson 326. "Right After Goldenweek Ends, If You Can See It, You Can See It" (GWあけも見えるっちゃあ見える, Gōruden Wīku Ake mo Mieru Tchā Mieru); Lesson 327. "Candles Are a Bit Exciting Aren't They?" (ロウソクってちょっとドキドキするよね, Rōsoku tte Chotto Dokidoki Suru yo ne); Lesson 328. "A Crabs Pincers Can Snap Bonds Too" (カニのハサミは絆を断つハサミ, Kani no Hasami wa Kizuna wo Tatsu Hasami)
38	An Old Guy's Home Situation Is Usually Pretty Tough; Ossan no Katei Jijō wa Daibu Hādo (おっさんの家庭事情は大分ハード)	February 4, 2011; 978-4-08-870176-9	—
Lesson 329. "An Old Guy's Home Situation Is Usually Pretty Tough" (おっさんの家庭事情は大分ハード, Ossan no Katei Jijō wa Daibu Hādo); Lesson 330. "The Old Man Is Surprisingly Soft Heart" (おっさんのハートは意外とソフト, Ossan no Hāto wa Igai to Sofuto); Lesson 331. "Even Adults Can Learn a Lot From Field Trips" (社会見学は大人にとっても学ぶ事の多い場, Shakai Kengaku wa Otona ni Tottemo Manabu Koto no Ōi Ba); Lesson 332. "To Be Honest, I Don't Have A Single Memory Of Having A Observational Study At A Factory." (工場見学とか正直一つたりとも記憶に残ってねェ, Kōjō Kengaku to ka Shōjiki Hitotsu Taritomo Kioku ni Nokottenē); Lesson 333. "Everyone Has Committed The Sin Of Borrowing Without Returning" (人はしらないうちに借りパクという罪を犯している, Hito wa Shiranai Uchi ni Karipaku to Iu Tsumi o Okashiteiru); Lesson 334. "In The Public Baths, Our Bodies And Souls Are Naked" (銭湯では身も心も丸裸, Sentō de wa Mi mo Kokoro mo Maru Hadaka); Bankara San ga Tōru (ばんからさんが通る)
39	Even A New Years Party Has Things You Should Never Forget; Bōnen Kai demo Wasurecha Ikenai Mono ga Aru (忘年会でも忘れちゃいけないものがある)	April 4, 2011; 978-4-08-870208-7	—
Lesson 335. "It Is The Same If It Is Camila, Vidal Sassoon or Timotel As Long As You Clean Your Back" (椿派もヴィダルサスーン派もティモテ派も背中を流し合えば一つ, Tsubaki Ha mo Vidaru Sasūn Ha mo Timote Ha mo Senaka o Nagashiaeba Hitotsu); Lesson 336. "Even A New Years Party Has Things You Should Never Forget" (忘年会でも忘れちゃいけないものがある, Bōnen Kai demo Wasurecha Ikenai Mono ga Aru); Lesson 337. "It'll Be Okay~." (だいじょぶだ～, Daijobu Da～); Lesson 338. "Beware of the Housewife Next Door" (隣の奥様に気をつけろ, Tonari no Oku Sama ni Ki o Tsukero); Lesson 339. "People Are Able to Live By Forgetting Some Things" (人は忘れることで生きていける, Hito wa Wasureru Koto de Ikiteikeru); Lesson 340. "Sure, prison break season two is still more of the same, but it's only cause they've got to break out of the rotting prison known as society that the title still fits" (プリズンブレイクシーズン2って確かにもうプリズンブレイクしてるけどあれはこの腐った社会がプリズンってことだからプリズンブレイクでいいんだよ, Purizun Bureiku Shīzun Tsū tte Tashika ni Mō Purizun Bureiku Shiteru Kedo Are wa Kono Kusatta Shakai ga Purizun tte Koto Dakara Purizun Bureiku de Iinda yo); Lesson 341. "Everyone Wears Pajamas" (人は皆 パジャマっ子, Hito wa Mina Pajamakko); Lesson 342. "I'll Cast You Into The Punishment Chamber" (懲罰房にブチ込むぞ, Chōbatsubō ni Buchikomu zo); Lesson 343. "Red and Blue Ecstasy" (青と赤のエクスタシー, Ao to Aka no Ekusutashī)
40	The Wide World is Riddled with Love; Wataru Seken wa Ai Bakari (渡る世間は愛ばかり)	July 4, 2011; 978-4-08-870237-7	—
Lesson 344. "I Daresay, May I Come Skiing With You?" (拙者をスキーにつれてって, Sessha o Sukī ni Tsurete tte); Lesson 345. "Even When One Puts the Utmost Effort into Creating Snow Domes, the Next Day Some Brat Will Break Them." (かまくらはどんだけ頑張って作っても次の日にはどっかのクソガキに壊される, Kamakura wa Dondake Ganbatte Tsukuttemo Tsugi no Hi ni wa Dokka no Kusogaki ni Kowasareru); Lesson 346. "We Can't Take a Company Vacation There!!" (慰安旅行はイヤンどこォ!?, Ian Ryokō wa Iyan Dokō!?); Lesson 347. "Love Has No Pluses or Minuses" (愛にプラスもマイナスもなし, Ai ni Purasu mo Mainasu mo Nashi); Lesson 348. "Love is an Illusion" (愛なんてしょせん幻想, Ai Nante Shosen Gensō); Lesson 349. "Love is not something to take, but something one receives" (愛とはもらうものではなく与えるものなり, Ai to wa Morau Mono Dewanaku Ataeru Mono Nari); Lesson 350. "The Wide World is Riddled with Love" (渡る世間は愛ばかり, Wataru Seken wa Ai Bakari); Lesson 351. "Thinking of a title for this thing that sounds like a text message subject was a pain in the ass" (ここのタイトルもメールのタイトルみたいなトコも考えるのメンド臭ぇ, Koko no Taitoru mo Mēru no Taitoru Mitai na Toko mo Kangaeru no Mendo Kusē); Lesson 352. "Out of Range Messenger" (圏外からの使者, Kengai kara no Shisha)

=== Volumes 41–60 ===
No.	Title	Original release date	English release date
41	Don't say Sayonaraion; Sayonaraion Nanka Iwasenai (さよなライオンなんか言わせない)	September 2, 2011; 978-4-08-870283-4	—
Lesson 353. "The end of a picture story show and a show of dreams" (紙芝居 夢芝居 これでオシマイ, Kami Shibai Yume Shibai Kore de O Shimai); Lesson 354. "A forgotten guy will come at the time he is least remembered" (忘れっぽい奴は忘れた頃にやってくる, Wasureppoi Yatsu wa Wasureta Koro ni Yattekuru); Lesson 355. "Space Bururun Taizaki" (宇宙ブルルン滞在記, Uchū Bururun Taizaiki); Lesson 356. "If you're a man, try the cockpit at least once" (男だったら一度はコックピット, Otoko Dattara Ichi Do wa Kokkupitto); Lesson 357. "A Senryouhako is just a trash bin" (千両箱とガラクタの箱, Senryōbako to Garakuta no Hako); Lesson 358. "Empty Star" (空の星, Kara no Hoshi); Lesson 359. "Business Transactions are Fierce Battles" (商いとは戦い, Akinai to wa Tatakai); Lesson 360. "Don't say Sayonaraion" (さよなライオンなんか言わせない, Sayonaraion Nanka Iwasenai); Special Lesson. Korabo ni wa Eirian Bāsasu Puredetā ga Aru no mo Oboeteoke (コラボにはエイリアンVSプレデターがあるのも覚えておけ)
42	A Letter from Baragaki; Baragaki kara no Tegami (バラガキからの手紙)	November 4, 2011; 978-4-08-870303-9	—
Lesson 361. "The painters known as manga artist use life experience as their paintbrush and canvas" (漫画という画布に人生という筆で絵を描け, Manga to Iu Gafu ni Jinsei to Iu Fude de E o Egake); Lesson 362. "Are you a bon bon sorta guy? Or a koro koro sort of guy?" (コロコロ派かボンボン派かと問われれば わんぱっく派です, KoroKoro Ha ka BonBon Ha ka to Towarereba Wanpakku Ha Desu); Lesson 363. "According to the alphabet's order, all of humanity are hosts" (アルファベット表記で人類皆ホスト, Arufabetto Hyōki de Jinrui Mina Hosuto); Lesson 364. "Girls love Vegeta, and guys like Piccolo" (女はベジータ好き 男はピッコロ好き, Onna wa Bejīta Zuki Otoko wa Pikkoro Zuki); Lesson 365. "Check it out!" (チェケラ!!, Chekera!!); Lesson 366. "If all a pair of siblings has is hardships, then even the good things they do will eventually become hardships" (デキの悪い兄弟をもつと苦労するがデキが良くても結局苦労する, Deki no Warui Kyōdai o Motsu to Kurō Suru ga Deki ga Yokutemo Kekkyoku Kurō Suru); Lesson 367. "The thorns that poke the cogwheel" (歯車に絡まった茨, Haguruma ni Karamatta Ibara); Lesson 368. "Baragaki and Baragaki" (茨ガキと薔薇ガキ, Baragaki to Baragaki); Lesson 369. "Bad brats party hearty" (悪ガキどもの祭典, Warugaki Domo no Saiten); Lesson 370. "A Letter from Baragaki" (バラガキからの手紙, Baragaki kara no Tegami)
43	Nobody with a Straight Perm is a Bad Guy; Sutorēto Pāma ni Warui Yatsu wa Inai (ストレートパーマに悪い奴はいない)	February 3, 2012; 978-4-08-870360-2	—
Lesson 371. "Millioner Madao" (マダオドッグミリオネア, Madao Doggu Mirionea); Kintama Lesson 1 (Lesson 372). "Nobody with a Straight Perm is a Bad Guy" (ストレートパーマに悪い奴はいない, Sutorēto Pāma ni Warui Yatsu wa Inai); Kintama Lesson 2 (Lesson 373). "Nobody with a Straight Perm is a Bad Guy; 2" (続ストレートパーマに悪い奴はいない, Zoku Sutorēto Pāma ni Warui Yatsu wa Inai); Kintama Lesson 3 (Lesson 374). "Gold or Silver" (GOLD OR SILVER, Gōrudo oa Shirubā); Kintama Lesson 4 (Lesson 375). "Kin-san's Kin****" (金さんの金○, Kin San no Kin Pī); Kintama Lesson 5 (Lesson 376). "Writing "Friend" and Reading it as "Enemy"" (「友」と書いて「てき」と読む, Tomo to Kaite Teki to Yomu); Kintama Lesson 6 (Lesson 377). "Writing "Enemy" and Reading it as "Friend"" (「敵」と書いて「とも」と読む, Teki to Kaite Tomo to Yomu); Kintama Lesson 7 (Lesson 378). "Steel Memories" (鋼の記憶, Hagane no Kioku); Kintama Final Lesson (Lesson 379). "A Protagonist Is" (主人公とは, Shujinkō to wa); Mantama Counter 1 (Lesson 380). "A Man's Sword" (男の剣, Otoko no Ken)
44	The Prostitute That Turns The Tables; Keisei Gyakuten (傾城逆転)	April 4, 2012; 978-4-08-870387-9	—
Lesson 381. "Presents should be sent early" (贈り物はお早めに, Okurimono wa O Hayame ni); Lesson 382. "Seems talk of otoshidama usually results in an outburst of toilet humor" (お年玉は下ネタとの相性がバツグン, O Toshidama wa Shimoneta to no Aishō ga Batsugun); Lesson 383. "When You're Sleeping Under a Kotatsu, Be Careful You Don't Cook Your ***tama" (コタツで寝る時は○玉熱しないよう気をつけろ, Kotatsu de Neru Toki wa Pī Tama Nesshinai Yō Ki o Tsukero); Lesson 384. "Inspecting Love Begins With An Inspection" (監察の恋は観察から始まる, Kansatsu no Koi wa Kansatsu kara Hajimaru); Lesson 385. "In The End, The Parents Don't Like Anyone The Kid Brings Home" (結局親は誰が来ても気にくわない, Kekkyoku Oya wa Dare ga Kitemo Ki ni Kuwanai); Lesson 386. "The Prostitute That Turns The Tables" (傾城逆転, Keisei Gyakuten); Lesson 387. "Eww! Not You Old Man!!" (じいやはいやー!!, Jiiya wa iyā!!); Lesson 388. "I Daresay We're In The Palace!!" (殿中でござる!!, Denchū Degozaru!!); Lesson 389. "The Guys Who Go To Sleep First At Slumber Parties Are Usually Up To No Good" (お泊り会は先に寝た奴からイタズラされる, O Tomari Kai wa Saki ni Neta Yatsu kara Itazura Sareru)
45	Vow; Shinjūdate (心中立て)	July 4, 2012; 978-4-08-870428-9	—
Lesson 390. "'Country Seizing' Is Kinda More Exciting to Write Than 'Country Taking'" (「国取」より「国盗」って書いた方がなんかドキドキするよね, Kunitori yori Kunitori tte Kaita Hō ga Nanka Dokidoki Suru yo ne); Lesson 391. "Five Fingers" (5本の指, Go Hon no Yubi); Lesson 392. "The Sun and The Moon" (日輪と月, Nichirin to Tsuki); Lesson 393. "Purge" (大獄, Taigoku); Lesson 394. "Enemies That Fate Brought Together" (呉越同舟, Goetsu Dōshū); Lesson 395. "Paradise and Hellfire" (極楽と地獄, Gokuraku to Jigoku); Lesson 396. "Vow" (心中立て, Shinjūdate); Lesson 397. "Samurai's Country" (侍の国, Samurai no Kuni); Lesson 398. "Two Demons" (二匹の鬼, Ni Hiki no Oni); Lesson 399. "Unsinking Moon" (沈まぬ月, Shizumanu Tsuki)
46	The Thing Known as a Beam Can Pierce Through the Hearts of Everyone; Bīmu to Iu Hibiki wa Arayuru Mono no Hāto o Inuku (ビームという響きはあらゆる者のハートを射抜く)	October 4, 2012; 978-4-08-870496-8	—
Lesson 400. "Dog Food isn't as Tasty as it Looks" (ドッグフードは見た目より味がうすい, Doggu Fūdo wa Mitame yori Aji ga Usui); Lesson 401. "Dog Food Makes for a Surprisingly Good Snack to go with Alcohol" (ドッグフードは意外に酒の肴になる, Doggu Fūdo wa Igai ni Sake no Sakana ni Naru); Lesson 402. "The Thing Known as a Beam Can Pierce Through the Hearts of Everyone" (ビームという響きはあらゆる者のハートを射抜く, Bīmu to Iu Hibiki wa Arayuru Mono no Hāto o Inuku); Lesson 403. "A Laughing Gate Invites Misfortune" (笑う門には厄来る, Warau Kado ni wa Yaku Kitaru); Lesson 404. "Two Brothers" (二人のアニキ, Futari no Aniki); Lesson 405. "Everyone's Dignity" (それぞれの矜持, Sorezore no Kyōji); Lesson 406. "We Don't Want 'em, You Bastard" (願いさげだぜコノヤロー, Negaisage Da ze Kono Yarō); Lesson 407. "Shin-boy and Hajime-nii" (新坊と一兄, Shin Bō to Hajime Nii); Lesson 408. "Doctrine of the Beam Saber Style" (ビームサーベ流の教え, Bīmu Sāberū no Oshie); Lesson 409. Sake to Gasorin to Egao to Namida (酒とガソリンと笑顔と涙)
47	One Editor is Enough; Tantō Henshū wa Hitori de Tariru (担当編集は一人で足りる)	December 4, 2012; 978-4-08-870532-3	—
Lesson 410. "One Editor is Enough" (担当編集は一人で足りる, Tantō Henshū wa Hitori de Tariru); Lesson 411. "A Begirama Summer" (ベギラマな夏, Begirama na Natsu); Lesson 412. "Amen" (アーメン, Āmen); Lesson 413. "Jesus" (ジーザス, Jīzasu); Lesson 414. "Fool!" (愚か者!!, Orokamono!!); Lesson 415. "Being a Leader is Tough" (リーダーは辛いよ, Rīdā wa Tsurai yo); Lesson 416. "Dudes with huge nostrils also have a lot to express" (鼻の穴のデカイ奴は発想力もデカイ, Hana no Ana no Dekai Yatsu wa Hassōryoku mo Dekai); Lesson 417. "Before memorizing historical events, try burning the image of people into your mind" (年号暗記より人間焼きつけろ, Nengō Anki yori Ningen Yakitsukero); Lesson 418. "Mirrors Show Both Beauty and Ugliness" (鏡は美も醜もありのまま映し出す, Kagami wa Bi mo Shū mo Ari no Mama Utsushidasu)
48	Set the Heart Aflame; Hāto ni Hi o Tsukete (ハートに火をつけて)	February 4, 2013; 978-4-08-870615-3	—
Lesson 419. "Set the Heart Aflame" (ハートに火をつけて, Hāto ni Hi o Tsukete); Lesson 420. "Climbing the Stairway of Adulthood Means Being Confined and Unable to Rise" (大人の階段は昇り階段とは限らない, Otona no Kaidan wa Nobori Kaidan to wa Kagiranai); Lesson 421. "Romantic Love and Parental Affection" (恋愛と親愛, Ren'ai to Shin'ai); Lesson 422. "Bald Dad, Grey Haired Dad, and Glasses Dad" (ハゲたお父さんと白髪のお父さんとお父さんのメガネ, Hageta O Tō San to Shiraga no O Tō San to O Tō San no Megane); Lesson 423. "No One Is Interested In License Photos" (免許証の写真を気に入ってる奴は皆無, Menkyoshō no Shashin o Ki ni Itteru Yatsu wa Kaimu); Lesson 424. "3000 Leagues in Search of Scabbard" (鞘をたずねて三千里, Saya o Tazunete Sanzen Ri); Lesson 425. "Total Sadist vs Total Sadist" (ドSとドS, Do Esu to Do Esu); Lesson 426. "Both Idiots and Katana Have Their Uses" (バカと刀は使いよう, Baka to Katana wa Tsukaiyō); Lesson 427. "Realistically Spiral Turds Have a Maximum of Two Full Twists" (巻きグソは現実的に二回転位が限界, Makiguso wa Genjitsu Teki ni Ni Kaiten Gurai ga Genkai)
49	A Bowl of Ramen; Ippai no Rāmen (一杯のラーメン)	May 2, 2013; 978-4-08-870647-4	—
Lesson 428. "The Ultimate Blade and The Worst Dullness" (最強の剣と最低の鈍, Saikyō no Ken to Saitei no Namakura); Lesson 429. "Invisible Scabbard" (見えない鞘, Mienai Saya); Lesson 430. "The Difference Between Godly Games and Shitty Games is Paper Thin" (神ゲーと糞ゲーは紙一重, Kami Gē to Kuso Gē wa Kami Hitoe); Lesson 431. "A Bowl of Ramen" (一杯のラーメン, Ippai no Rāmen); Lesson 432. "One Crust of Bread" (一きれのパンのみみ, Hitokire no Pan no Mimi); Lesson 433. "One Family" (一つのかぞく, Hitotsu no Kazoku); Lesson 434. "Fashionable is Something That Disappears The Moment it is Put Into Words" (オシャレとはオシャレと言葉にした時点でかき消えるものなり, Oshare to wa Oshare to Kotoba ni Shita Jiten de Kakikieru Mono Nari); Lesson 435. "All Answers are in the Field" (全ての答えは現場にある, Subete no Kotae wa Genba ni Aru); Lesson 436. "New Sentai Sentais Seem to Start Out as Things You Could Never Approve of, but by the Last Episode, You Don't Want Them to go Away" (新しく始まる戦隊モノは最初はこんなの認めねェみたいになっているが最終回の頃には離れたくなくなっている, Atarashiku Hajimaru Sentai Mono wa Saisho wa Konna no Mitomenē Mitai ni Natteiru ga Saishū Kai no Koro ni wa Hanaretakunakunatteiru)
50	9+1=Jubei Yagyu; Kyū Tasu Ichi wa Yagyū Jūbē (9+1=柳生十兵衛)	July 4, 2013; 978-4-08-870682-5	—
Lesson 437. "9+1=Jubei Yagyu" (9+1=柳生十兵衛, Kyū Tasu Ichi wa Yagyū Jūbē); Lesson 438. "I Believe I Can Both Be Beautiful and Make Manga" (美と漫画って両立できると私は思います, Bi to Manga tte Ryōritsu Dekiru to Watashi wa Omoimasu); Lesson 439. "When You Forget About Calories is When They Come Back" (カロリーは忘れた頃にやってくる, Karorī wa Wasureta Koro ni Yattekuru); Lesson 440. "Affection, Heartache, Manliness, and Femininity" (愛しさと切なさと男らしさと女らしさと, Itoshisa to Setsunasa to Otoko Rashisa to Onna Rashisa to); Lesson 441. "10-1=" (10-1=, Jū Hiku Ichi wa); Lesson 442. "G Pens are Whimsical, Round Pens are Stubborn" (Gペンは気まぐれ屋さん丸ペンは頑固者, Jī Pen wa Kimagureya San Maru Pen wa Gankomono); Lesson 443. "Mommy's Bentou are Always Too Cold and Somewhat Squashed" (母ちゃんの弁当はいつもつめすぎて若干潰れている, Kā Chan no Bentō wa Itsumo Tsumesugite Jakkan Tsubureteiru); Lesson 444. "The Sunglasses of Life and Death" (生と死のグラサン, Sei to Shi no Gurasan); Lesson 445. "A Snotty Diamond" (ハナクソダイヤモンド, Hanakuso Daiyamondo)
51	Mettle of an Idol; Aidoru no Kunshō (アイドルの勲章)	September 4, 2013; 978-4-08-870802-7	—
Lesson 446. "Before you Shake Someone's Hands be Sure yours are Properly Washed" (握手の前は手を洗え, Akushu no Mae wa Te o Arae); Lesson 447. "Diamonds Cannot be Scarred" (ダイヤモンドは傷つかない, Daiyamondo wa Kizutsukanai); Lesson 448. "Bitches that Take the Lead" (導かれしビッチ達, Michibikareshi Bitchi Tachi); Lesson 449. "Mettle of an Idol" (アイドルの勲章, Aidoru no Kunshō); Lesson 450. "People Under Fifty Who Dream of the Lottery is Like a Rising Tide" (人間五十年下天のうちをくらぶれば夢 宝くじの如くなり, Ningen Go Jū Nen Geten no Uchi o Kurabureba Yume Takarakuji no Gotoku Nari); Lesson 451. "Human Life Lasts Only 50 Years, Contrasting Human Life with a Life of Geten it is but Dreams and Mohicans" (人間五十年下天のうちをくらぶれば夢 モヒカンの如くなり, Ningen Go Jū Nen Geten no Uchi o Kurabureba Yume Mohikan no Gotoku Nari); Lesson 452. "It's Tough for People who Show Up to Class Reunions Late to Join in" (同窓会は遅れてくると入りづらい, Dōsōkai wa Okurete Kuru to Hairizurai); Lesson 453. "It's During Alumni Reunions that Things you Don't Want to Remember are Revived" (同窓会は思い出したくない思い出も蘇ってくる, Dōsōkai wa Omoidashitakunai Omoide mo Yomigaettekuru); Lesson 454. "Class Reunion of Shadows and Demons" (鬼と影の同窓会, Oni to Kage no Dōsōkai); Lesson 455. "You Can Hide Erotic Books but You Can't Hide ****" (エロ本隠して○○○隠さず, Ero Hon Kakushite Pī Kakusazu)
52	A Shinigami of Dawn and Night; Asa to Yoru no Shinigami (朝と夜の死神)	December 4, 2013; 978-4-08-870834-8	—
Lesson 456. "The Phoenix Will Always Rise Again" (フェニックスは何度も蘇る, Fenikkusu wa Nando mo Yomigaeru); Lesson 457. "Making Light of Early Plot Elements is Fatal" (初期設定はナメたら命取り, Shoki Settei wa Nametara Inochitori); Lesson 458. "Feigned Illnesses are the Source of All Kinds of Diseases" (仮病は万病の元, Kebyō wa Manbyō no Moto); Lesson 459. "A Farewell Greeting Should Be Concise" (別れの挨拶は簡潔に, Wakare no Aisatsu wa Kanketsu ni); Lesson 460. "Love is Gokiburi Hoi-hoi" (恋はゴキブリポイポイ, Koi wa Gokiburi Poipoi); Lesson 461. "You may hide your face, but you cannot hide your heart" (顔隠して心隠さず, Kao Kakushite Kokoro Kakusazu); Lesson 462. "Not a damn thing happened in summer 2013" (何もねぇよ夏2013, Nani mo Nē yo Natsu Ni Sen Jū San); Lesson 463. "Generally characters who appear in white clothing will end up dying in a pool of blood" (白い服を着て出て来たキャラは大体血だらけになって死ぬ, Shiroi Fuku o Kite Detekita Kyara wa Daitai Chi Darake ni Natte Shinu); Lesson 464. "A Shinigami of Dawn and Night" (朝と夜の死神, Asa to Yoru no Shinigami); Lesson 465. "Human? Or Demon?" (鬼か人か, Oni ka Hito ka)
53	So Long Shinigami; Saraba Shinigami (さらば死神)	February 4, 2014; 978-4-08-880006-6	—
Lesson 466. "Hijikata Crosses Into the Mayonnaise Line and Disappears" (土方はマヨネーズ航路の彼方に消えました, Hijikata wa Mayonēzu Rain no Kanata ni Kiemashita); Lesson 467. "Okita also Disappeared in the Distant Sadistic Line" (沖田もドS航路の彼方に消えました, Okita mo Do Esu Rain no Kanata ni Kiemashita); Lesson 468. "Ikeda Yaemon" (池田夜右衛門, Ikeda Yaemon); Lesson 469. "So Long Shinigami" (さらば死神, Saraba Shinigami); Lesson 470. "I'm a Mayora and he's got a Sweet Tooth" (おれがマヨラーで あいつが甘党で, Ore ga Mayorā de Aitsu ga Amatō de); Lesson 471. "I have V shaped bangs, and he's a permhead" (おれがV字で あいつが天パで, Ore ga Bui Ji de Aitsu ga Ten Pa de); Lesson 472. "I'll be the right ball and he'll be the left" (おれが右の玉で あいつが左の玉で, Ore ga Migi no Tama de Aitsu ga Hidari no Tama de); Lesson 473. "I'm a failure as a leader and so is he" (おれがリーダー失格で あいつもリーダー失格で, Ore ga Rīdā Shikkaku de Aitsu mo Rīdā Shikkaku de); Lesson 474. "I'll be glasses and he'll be sunglasses" (ぼくがメガネで あいつがグラサンで, Boku ga Megane de Aitsu ga Gurasan de); Lesson 475. "I'll be a leader and so will you" (おれがリーダーで おまえもリーダーで, Ore ga Rīdā de Omae mo Rīdā de); Lesson 476. "I'm Yorozuya and he's Shinsengumi" (おれが万事屋で あいつが真選組で, Ore ga Yorozuya de Aitsu ga Shinsengumi de)
54	Always Open Bags Like They Have 50 Million in Them; Baggu wa Tsune ni Go Sen Man Hairu Yō ni Aketeoke (バッグは常に5千万入るようにあけておけ)	May 2, 2014; 978-4-08-880041-7	—
Lesson 477. "Always Open Bags Like They Have 50 Million in Them" (バッグは常に5千万入るようにあけておけ, Baggu wa Tsune ni Go Sen Man Hairu Yō ni Aketeoke); Lesson 478. "Whether it be a bag or a ball sack, it's recommended to open them as well." (バッグにはきたろう袋も入れておけ, Baggu ni wa Kitarōbukuro mo Ireteoke); Lesson 479. "A True Merchant" (本当の商, Hontō no Akinai); Lesson 480. "Open your bags like they always have rocks in 'em" (バッグは常に石ころが入るようにあけておけ, Baggu wa Tsune ni Ishikoro ga Hairu Yō ni Aketeoke); Lesson 481. "Essay Manga Are Easy to Draw" (エッセイ漫画は作画楽, Essei Manga wa Sakuga Raku); Lesson 482. "The kanji for thief has a lot of evil in it" (泥棒って漢字 悪意ハンパねェ, Dorobō tte Kanji Akui Hanpa Nē); Lesson 483. "Two Monkeys" (二人の猿公, Futari no Etekō); Lesson 484. "Awesome situations never stop during a brief pause" (一時停止は うまい具合には止まらない, Ichiji Teishi wa Umai Guai ni wa Tomaranai); Lesson 485. "There is Trash that Even a Matsuibou Cannot Get Rid of" (マツイ棒でもとれないゴミがある, Matsui Bō demo Torenai Gomi ga Aru); Lesson 486. "There are Two Types of Humans in the World, Those that Shout Special Attacks and Those that Don't" (世の中には二種類の人間がいる それは必殺技を叫ぶ人間と叫ばない人間だ, Yo no Naka ni wa Ni Shurui no Ningen ga Iru Sore wa Hissatsu Waza o Sakebu Ningen to Sakebanai Ningen Da)
55	In Both Spring and Winter; Haru mo Fuyu mo (春も冬も)	July 4, 2014; 978-4-08-880135-3	—
Lesson 487. "An ID Photo is Proof of the Harshness of Reality" (証明写真は現実の厳しさを証明するもの, Shōmei Shashin wa Genjitsu no Kibishisa o Shōmei Suru Mono); Lesson 488. "Afros of Life and Death" (生と死のアフロ, Sei to Shi no Afuro); Lesson 489. "Afros of Love and Hate" (愛と憎しみのアフロ, Ai to Nikushimi no Afuro); Lesson 490. "Afros of Justice and Betrayal" (正義と裏切りのアフロ, Seigi to Uragiri no Afuro); Lesson 491. "A Furou and A-Fro" (阿腐郎とアフ狼, Afurō to Afuro); Lesson 492. "Smoke Rises in Places Without Love" (恋のない所に煙は立たない, Koi no Nai Tokoro ni Kemuri wa Tatanai); Lesson 493. "The Heavens Do Not Make Beautiful Women Better Than Ugly Woman" (天はブスの上に美女を作らず, Ten wa Busu no Ue ni Bijo o Tsukurazu); Lesson 494. "Beast Trash" (ケダモノだもの, Kedamono Da Mono); Lesson 495. "Eternal Flower" (永遠の花, Eien no Hana); Lesson 496. "In Both Spring and Winter" (春も冬も, Haru mo Fuyu mo)
56	Shoguns of Light and Shadow; Hikari to Kage no Shōgun (光と影の将軍)	October 3, 2014; 978-4-08-880172-8	—
Lesson 497. "Strike While the Iron and the Evil King are Hot" (鉄と魔王は熱いうちに打て, Tetsu to Maō wa Atsui Uchi ni Ute); Lesson 498. "Oil Rain" (オイルの雨, Oiru no Ame); Lesson 499. "Glasses are Part of the Heart" (メガネは魂の一部, Megane wa Kokoro no Ichi Bu); Lesson 500. "Does Everyone Really See the Same World?" (本当にみんなと同じ世界を映していますか, Hontō ni Minna to Onaji Sekai o Utsushiteimasu ka); Lesson 501. "Guardian Spirits are a Part of the Body, Too" (守護霊も魂の一部, Shugorei mo Kokoro no Ichi Bu); Lesson 502. "Shoguns of Light and Shadow" (光と影の将軍, Hikari to Kage no Shōgun); Lesson 503. "A Horse from a Gourd" (瓢箪から駒, Hyōtan kara Koma); Lesson 504. "A Shogun's Duty and a Shinobi's Duty" (将軍の務めと忍の務め, Shōgun no Tsutome to Shinobi no Tsutome); Lesson 505. "Villains and Policemen" (悪党とおまわり, Akutō to O Mawari); Lesson 506. "Shinobi Country" (忍の里, Shinobi no Kuni)
57	Those that Protect All; Yorozu o Mamoru Mono Tachi (万事を護る者達)	January 5, 2015; 978-4-08-880209-1	—
Lesson 507. "Steel Peashooter" (鋼の豆鉄砲, Hagane no Mamedeppō); Lesson 508. "Soul of the Shinobi" (忍の魂, Shinobi no Tamashii); Lesson 509. "Proof (Scar)" (傷, Akashi); Lesson 510. "Samurai and Shinobi" (侍と忍, Samurai to Shinobi); Lesson 511. "The Last 5 People" (最後の5人, Saigo no Go Nin); Lesson 512. "Request" (依頼, Irai); Lesson 513. "Place to Go Back To" (帰る場所, Kaeru Basho); Lesson 514. "Those that Protect All" (万事を護る者達, Yorozu o Mamoru Mono Tachi); Lesson 515. "A Sibling Spat And a Battle to Seize a Country" (国盗合戦と兄妹喧嘩, Kunitori Gassen to Kyōdai Genka)
58	Farewell, Pal; Saraba Dachikō (さらばダチ公)	April 3, 2015; 978-4-08-880328-9	—
Lesson 516. "Two Good-For-Nothings" (ろくでなし二人, Rokudenashi Futari); Lesson 517. "Each One's Samurai" (それぞれの侍, Sorezore no Samurai); Lesson 518. "Fist" (げんこつ, Genkotsu); Lesson 519. "Enemies" (仇, Kataki); Lesson 520. "Sakata of Shouka Shonjoku" (松下村塾の坂田銀時, Shōkasonjuku no Sakata Gintoki); Lesson 521. "After The War, The Crow Caws" (戦のあとには烏が哭く, Ikusa no Ato ni wa Karasu ga Naku); Lesson 522. "The Disciples of Shouyou" (松陽の弟子達, Shōyō no Deshi Tachi); Lesson 523. "Resistance" (抗い, Aragai); Lesson 524. "Farewell, Pal" (さらばダチ公, Saraba Dachikō)
59	3 Sake Cups; Sanbai no Sakazuki (3杯の盃)	June 4, 2015; 978-4-08-880364-7	—
Lesson 525. "3 Sake Cups" (3杯の盃, Sanbai no Sakazuki); Lesson 526. "The Day the Demon Cried" (鬼が哭いた日, Oni ga Naita Hi); Lesson 527. "New Ones and Old Ones" (新しき者と旧き者, Atarashiki Mono to Furuki Mono); Lesson 528. "Heroes Show Up Late" (ヒーローは遅れてやってくる, Hīrō wa Okurete Yattekuru); Lesson 529. "Forgotten Think" (忘れもの, Wasuremono); Lesson 530. "The Shogun and the Villains (Joui Patriots)" (将軍と攘夷志士, Shōgun to Akutō); Lesson 531. "Jailbreak" (脱獄, Datsugoku); Lesson 532. "Festival" (祭, Matsuri); Lesson 533. "Stray Dogs" (野良犬, Nora Inu)
60	True Path; Makoto no Michi (真の道)	August 4, 2015; 978-4-08-880445-3	—
Lesson 534. "Iron Rules of Surveillance" (監察の鉄則, Kansatsu no Tessoku); Lesson 535. "Shinsengumi Kyokuchuu Hatto Article 47" (真選組局中法度第47条, Shinsegumi Kyokuchū Hatto Dai Yon Jū Shichi Jō); Lesson 536. "Two Generals" (二人の大将, Futari no Taishō); Lesson 537. "That Name is..." (「その名は...」, Sono Na wa...); Lesson 538. "True Path" (真の道, Makoto no Michi); Lesson 539. "Undelivered Email" (届かなかったメール, Todokanakatta Mēru); Lesson 540. "Villain" (悪役, Akuyaku); Lesson 541. "Star of Freedom" (自由の星, Jiyū no Hoshi); Lesson 542. "Shinigami" (死神, Shinigami)

=== Volumes 61–77 ===
No.	Title	Original release date	English release date
61	Farewell, Shinsengumi; Saraba Shinsengumi (さらば真選組)	November 4, 2015; 978-4-08-880498-9	—
Lesson 543. "Signal Fire" (狼煙, Noroshi); Lesson 544. "Memories of the Sword" (剣の記憶, Ken no Kioku); Lesson 545. "Karma" (業, Gō); Lesson 546. "Last Address" (最後のアドレス, Saigo no Adoresu); Lesson 547. "Mistake" (過ち, Ayamachi); Lesson 548. "Something Forgotten" (忘れもの, Wasuremono); Lesson 549. "Nobume" (信女, Nobume); Lesson 550. "Farewell Shinsengumi (First Part)" (さらば真選組 前篇, Saraba Shinsengumi Zenpen); Lesson 551. "Farewell Shinsengumi (Latter Part)" (さらば真選組 後篇, Saraba Shinsengumi Kōhen)
62	The No-Good Brats from That Era; Ano Koro no Warugaki (あの頃の悪ガキ)	January 4, 2016; 978-4-08-880579-5	—
Lesson 552. "The Monster and the Monster's Child" (化物と化物の子, Bakemono to Bakemono no Ko); Lesson 553. "The Kiheitai's Final Day" (鬼兵隊の最後の日, Kiheitai no Saigo no Hi); Lesson 554. "Ryuumyaku" (龍脈, Ryūmyaku); Lesson 555. "Request for Leave of Absence" (休暇届, Kyūka Todoke); Lesson 556. "Worthless Thing" (くだらぬもの, Kudaranu Mono); Lesson 557. "The No-Good Brats From That Era" (あの頃の悪ガキ, Ano Koro no Warugaki); Lesson 558. "Hometown" (故郷, Kokyō); Lesson 559. "Scent" (匂い, Nioi); Lesson 560. "Final Blade" (最後の一刀, Saigo no Ittō); Lesson 561. "Warrior's Song" (武士の唄, Mononofu no Uta)
63	Manjuus and Breakfast; Manjū to Asameshi (まんじゅうと朝飯)	March 4, 2016; 978-4-08-880624-2	—
Lesson 562. "The Noble Youth of Madness" (狂乱の貴公子, Kyōran no Kikōshi); Lesson 563. "Runaway Kotarou" (逃げの小太郎, Nige no Kotarō); Lesson 564. "Zura" (ヅラ, Zura); Lesson 565. "Toys" (玩具, Gangu); Lesson 566. "Two Fools" (うつけもの二人, Utsukemono Futari); Lesson 567. "Peak" (頂, Itadaki); Lesson 568. "Sky Ship" (空の船, Kara no Fune); Lesson 569. "The Swordsman's Moment" (剣士の瞬間, Kenshi no Toki); Lesson 570. "Abyss of the Innards" (肚の深淵, Hara no Soko); Lesson 571. "Manjuus and Breakfast" (まんじゅうと朝飯, Manjū to Asameshi)
64	Old Friends and New Friends; Furuki Tomo to Ima no Tomo (旧き友と今の友)	May 2, 2016; 978-4-08-880668-6	—
Lesson 572. "Place of Death" (死に場所, Shinibasho); Lesson 573. "10 Years" (十年, Jū Nen); Lesson 574. "Path" (道, Michi); Lesson 575. "Old Friends and New Friends" (旧き友と今の友, Furuki Tomo to Ima no Tomo); Lesson 576. "Two Male Beasts" (二匹の雄, Ni Hiki no Osu); Lesson 577. "Crybaby" (泣き虫, Nakimushi); Lesson 578. "Frog in a Well" (井の中の蛙, I no Naka no Kawazu); Lesson 579. "Kouan's Master" (徨安のヌシ, Kōan no Nushi); Lesson 580. "Wilted Flower" (枯れた花, Kareta Hana)
65	Siblings; Kyōdai (兄妹)	August 4, 2016; 978-4-08-880748-5	—
Lesson 581. "Lost Rabbit" (まよい兎, Mayoi Usagi); Lesson 582. "Crystal" (結晶, Kesshō); Lesson 583. "Right Arm" (右腕, Migi Ude); Lesson 584. "Strongest" (最強, Saikyō); Lesson 585. "Name" (名前, Namae); Lesson 586. "Bottom" (底, Soko); Lesson 587. "Damn Idiot" (すっとこどっこい, Suttokodokkoi); Lesson 588. "Blue Planet" (青い星, Aoi Hoshi); Lesson 589. "Siblings" (兄妹, Kyōdai)
66	Even If a Natural Perm Gets Limp and Bent, It'll Eventually Spring Back; Tennen Pāma wa Gunyagunya Magattemo Modottekuru (天然パーマはグニャグニャ曲がっても戻ってくる)	November 4, 2016; 978-4-08-880803-1	—
Lesson 590. "First Disciple" (一番弟子, Ichiban Deshi); Lesson 591. "Blood and Soul" (血と魂, Chi to Tamashii); Lesson 592. "Complaining" (グチ, Guchi); Lesson 593. "The Two Utsuros" (二人の虚, Futari no Utsuro); Lesson 594. "Release" (解放, Kaihō); Lesson 595. "Hope" (希望, Kibō); Lesson 596. "Even if a Natural Perm Gets Limp and Bent, It'll Eventually Spring Back Part 1" (天然パーマはグニャグニャ曲がっても戻ってくる 前編, Tennen Pāma wa Gunyagunya Magattemo Modottekuru Zenpen); Lesson 597. "Even if a Natural Perm Gets Limp and Bent, It'll Eventually Spring Back Part 2" (天然パーマはグニャグニャ曲がっても戻ってくる 後編, Tennen Pāma wa Gunyagunya Magattemo Modottekuru Kōhen); Lesson 598. "Everyone has a Terminal Between Their Legs" (誰もが股にターミナル, Daremo ga Mata ni Tāminaru)
67	When You Wear a Headband, You Look Ready to Take an Exam; Hachimaki Maitara Jukensei ni Mieru (ハチマキ巻いたら受験生に見える)	December 31, 2016; 978-4-08-880884-0	—
Lesson 599. "Don't go Overboard with Seasoning" (調味料は控え目に, Chōmiryō wa Hikaeme ni); Lesson 600. "Your Abs Won't be Ripped but Your Ass Will Be" (ハラは割れないがケツは割れている, Hara wa Warenai ga Ketsu wa Wareteiru); Lesson 601. "If You Skip Reading Jump for One Week, Then Make Sure You Read Closely" (ジャンプ一週読まざれば刮目して見よ, Janpu Isshū Yomazareba Katsumoku Shite Miyo); Lesson 602. "Delinquent Kids Have Long Hair Going Down the Backs of Their Necks" (ヤンキーの子供は襟足が長い, Yankī no Kodomo wa Eriashi ga Nagai); Lesson 603. "Ninjas and Idiots like High Places" (忍者とバカは高い所が好き, Ninja to Baka wa Takai Tokoro ga Suki); Lesson 604. "The Difference Between Tenacious and Obstinate is Paper Thin" (しぶといとしつこいは紙一重, Shibutoi to Shitsukoi wa Kami Hitoe); Lesson 605. "When You Wear a Headband, You Look Ready to Take an Exam" (ハチマキ巻いたら受験生に見える, Hachimaki Maitara Jukensei ni Mieru); Lesson 606. "People that Lecture Others About Not Smoking Can't Give it up Themselves for Long" (禁煙は他人に言いふらす奴に限って続かない, Kin'en wa Tanin ni Iifurasu Yatsu ni Kagitte Tsuzukanai); Lesson 607. "The T in T-Shirt is the T in Tamashii (Soul)" (TシャツのTは魂のT, Tī Shatsu no Tī wa Tamashii no Tī)
68	The Second Son Tends to get Forgotten About; Jinanbō wa Wasureraregachi (次男坊は忘れられがち)	April 4, 2017; 978-4-08-881046-1	—
Lesson 608. "Jump Comes Out on Monday, Magazine and Sunday Come Out on Wednesday" (ジャンプは月曜日 マガジン、サンデーは水曜日, Janpu wa Getsuyōbi Magajin, Sandē wa Suiyōbi); Lesson 609. "Old Men Etch Things They Can't Forget Into Their Wrinkles" (爺さんは忘れてはいけないものを皺に刻む, Jii San wa Wasurete wa Ikenai Mono o Shiwa ni Kizamu); Lesson 610. "A Machine That's Learned to be Useless is Called a Piece of Junk (Or a Human)" (無駄を覚えた機械を人間という, Muda o Oboeta Karakuri o Ponkotsu to Iu); Lesson 611. "There's Nothing as Depressing as a Bossy Person that Likes Festivals" (祭り好きの仕切り屋ほどうっとうしいものはない, Matsurizuki no Shikiriya hodo Uttōshii Mono wa Nai); Lesson 612. "We are a Part of the Universe, We are the Universe Itself" (我々は宇宙の一部であり宇宙そのもの, Wareware wa Uchū no Ichi Bu Deari Uchū Sono Mono); Lesson 613. "Men Must Live Not Long or Thick, but Hard" (男は長くも太くもなく硬く生きろ, Otoko wa Nagaku mo Futoku mo naku Kataku Ikiro); Lesson 614. "The Second Son Tends to get Forgotten About" (次男坊は忘れられがち, Jinanbō wa Wasureraregachi); Lesson 615. "You Should Treasure Everything that has "Ball" in the Name" (「玉」の名がつくものは全て大事にすべし, Tama no Na ga Tsuku Mono wa Subete Daiji ni Subeshi); Lesson 616. "Dirty is a Fine Color, Too" (汚れも立派な色, Yogore mo Rippa na Iro); Lesson 617. "Onis are Weak to Small Things like Issun-Boushi" (鬼は一寸法師のような小粒に弱い, Oni wa Issun Bōshi no Yō na Kotsubu ni Yowai)
69	When You Tell Old Stories of Your Heroic Exploits, it Makes People Dislike You, So Get Other People to Tell Them; Mukashi no Buyūden wa Jibun de Hanasu to Kirawareru node Tanin ni Hanasasero (昔の武勇伝は自分で話すと嫌われるので他人に話させろ)	July 4, 2017; 978-4-08-881187-1	—
Lesson 618. "Logs can be Weapons, Houses, or even a Mode of Transport; They're Pretty Convenient" (丸太は武器にもなるし家にもなるし乗り物にもなるし便利, Maruta wa Buki ni mo Naru shi Ie ni mo Naru shi Norimono ni mo Naru shi Benri); Lesson 619. "When Your Playing Tag, the Faster the Person Who's It is, the More Exciting it Gets" (鬼ごっこは鬼の足が速いほど盛り上がる, Oni Gokko wa Oni no Ashi ga Hayai Hodo Moriagaru); Lesson 620. "Don't Be Early or Late" (遅くても早くてもいけない, Osokutemo Hayakutemo Ikenai); Lesson 621. "Watch Out for the 7 Times Tables" (七の段に気をつけろ, Nana no Dan ni Ki o Tsukero); Lesson 622. "The Candy Given to you By Your Elders is Special" (年寄りのくれるお菓子は独特, Toshiyori no Kureru O Kashi wa Dokutoku); Lesson 623. "When You Tell Old Stories of Your Heroic Exploits, it Makes People Dislike You, So Get Other People to Tell Them" (昔の武勇伝は自分で話すと嫌われるので他人に話させろ, Mukashi no Buyūden wa Jibun de Hanasu to Kirawareru node Tanin ni Hanasasero); Lesson 624. "Feet Have Fingers, Too" (指は足にもある, Yubi wa Ashi ni mo Aru); Lesson 625. "Instead of Thinking About Gambling as Betting Money, Let's Systematically Gamble Like We're Playing a Game." (博打は儲けは考えず遊びの範囲内で計画的に打ちましょう, Bakuchi wa Mōke wa Kangaezu Asobi no Han'i Nai de Keikaku Teki ni Uchimashō); Lesson 626. "The Important Thing with Jump Is Inflation" (ジャンプはインフレしてなんぼ, Janpu wa Infure Shite Nanbo); Lesson 627. "Peace and Destruction are Two Sides of the Same Coin" (平和と破滅は表裏一体, Heiwa to Hametsu wa Hyōri Ittai)
70	Those That Do Good Things While Doing Bad Things; Akuji o Hatarakinagara Zenji o Hataraku Ikimono (悪事をはたらきながら善事をはたらくいきもの)	October 4, 2017; 978-4-08-881207-6	—
Lesson 628. "When You Can't Get the Lid off a Jam Jar, Try Gripping it Tight with a Rubber Glove" (ジャムの蓋が開かなくなった時はゴム手袋でギュッと掴もう, Jamu no Futa ga Akanakunatta Toki wa Gomu Tebukuro de Gyutto Tsukamō); Lesson 629. "Logic is Essential to Solving Mysteries" (推理はロジックが大切, Suiri wa Rojikku ga Taisetsu); Lesson 630. "Bushido consists in dying in one second" (武士道とは一秒後に死ぬ事と見つけたり, Bushidō to wa Ichi Byō Go ni Shinu Koto to Mitsuketari); Lesson 631. "Sometimes You Just Have to Give Up" (諦めが肝心, Akirame ga Kanjin); Lesson 632. "Those That Do Good Things While Doing Bad Things" (悪事をはたらきながら善事をはたらくいきもの, Akuji o Hatarakinagara Zenji o Hataraku Ikimono); Lesson 633. "The Difference Between a Gadabout and a Sage is Paper Thin" (遊び人と賢者は紙一重, Asobinin to Kenja wa Kami Hitoe); Lesson 634. "Rabbits Jump High on Moonlit Nights" (兎は月夜に高く跳ぶ, Usagi wa Tsukiyo ni Takaku Tobu); Lesson 635. "To Put It Nicely, It's Vintage. To Put it Badly, It's Trash." (良く言えばヴィンテージ 悪く言えばゴミ, Yoku Ieba Vintēji Waruku Ieba Gomi); Lesson 636. "Even Without Qigong Breathing, It Gets Hard" (気功じゃなくてもあそこは硬くなる, Kikō Janakutemo Asoko wa Katakunaru)
71	To Make Interesting an Otherwise Boring World; Omoshiroki Koto mo Naki Yo o Omoshiroku (おもしろきこともなき世をおもしろく)	December 4, 2017; 978-4-08-881226-7	—
Lesson 637. "Be Careful of Scattering Too Many Flags" (フラグのバラまきすぎにご用心, Furagu no Baramakisugi ni Go Yōjin); Lesson 638. "Healthy Teeth Have Pretty Teeth Marks" (健康な歯は歯型もキレイ, Kenkō na Ha wa Hagata mo Kirei); Lesson 639. "Hell is More Close By Than Heaven" (天国より地獄の方が近場, Tengoku yori Jigoku no Hō ga Chikaba); Lesson 640. "To Make Interesting an Otherwise Boring World" (おもしろきこともなき世をおもしろく, Omoshiroki Koto mo Naki Yo o Omoshiroku); Lesson 641. "Heroes are Created by People" (英雄は人に作られるもの, Eiyū wa Hito ni Tsukurareru Mono); Lesson 642. "People that Wear Glasses Will Have Glasses When They Show Up as Ghosts" (メガネかけてる奴はメガネごと化けて出る, Megane Kaketeru Yatsu wa Megane Goto Bakete Deru); Lesson 643. "Blood and Tears" (血と涙, Chi to Namida); Lesson 644. "Fire Can't Burn Fire" (火で火は燃やせない, Hi de Hi wa Moyasenai); Lesson 645. "When You Do Something Out of Character, Something Out of Character Happens" (ガラじゃない事をするとガラじゃない事が起こる, Gara Janai Koto o Suru to Gara Janai Koto ga Okoru); Lesson 646. "The One Bolder Than Despair" (絶望よりも太い奴, Zetsubō Yori mo Futoi Yatsu)
72	When You Need a Hand, Ask A Beast With Paw Pads; Te o Kariru no wa Nikukyū no aru Kemono ni Shiteoke (手を借りるのは肉球のある獣にしておけ)	March 2, 2018; 978-4-08-881357-8	—
Lesson 647. "Beyond the Dream" (幻想のむこう, Yume no Mukō); Lesson 648. "The True Battlefield" (本当の戦場, Hontō no Senjō); Lesson 649. "The Many Kings" (数多の王, Amata no Ō); Lesson 650. "Be Careful You Don't Drink Too Much Dom Perignon" (ドンペリの飲み過ぎにも注意, Don Peri no Nomisugi ni mo Chūi); Lesson 651. "When You Need a Hand, Ask A Beast With Paw Pads" (手を借りるのは肉球のある獣にしておけ, Te o Kariru no wa Nikukyū no aru Kemono ni Shiteoke); Lesson 652. "The Planet of the End of the World and the Beginning of a Family" (世界の終わりと家族の始まりの星, Sekai no Owari to Kazoku no Hajimari no Hoshi); Lesson 653. "Two Swords" (二本差し, Ni Hon Zashi); Lesson 654. "Compact Pets are Easier to Keep" (ペットはコンパクトな方が飼いやすい, Petto wa Konpakuto na Hō ga Kaiyasui); Lesson 655. "It's Hard to See the Bottom From the Sky, but it's Easy to See the Sky from the Bottom" (空から底はよく見えないが底から空はよく見える, Sora kara Soko wa Yoku Mienai ga Soko kara Sora wa Yoku Mieru)
73	Flame of Life; Inochi no Hi (命の灯)	June 4, 2018; 978-4-08-881497-1	—
Lesson 656. "Someone Unemployed Cannot be Stained by Anything" (無職は何者にも染まらない, Mushoku wa Nanimono ni mo Somaranai); Lesson 657. "Dogs Love their Pack" (犬は群れを愛する, Inu wa Mure o Aisuru); Lesson 658. "A Creature That Just Barks" (吠えるだけの生き物, Hoeru Dake no Ikimono); Lesson 659. "Hold Onto Trump Cards" (切り札はとっておけ, Kirifuda wa Totteoke); Lesson 660. "Say Something Nice About Your Old Man Once in a While" (たまには親父を褒めてやれ, Tama ni wa Oyaji o Hometeyare); Lesson 661. "The Beginning of the End" (終わりの始まり, Owari no Hajimari); Lesson 662. "Things Without Ends" (終わらないもの, Owaranai Mono); Lesson 663. "Wounds" (傷, Kizu); Lesson 664. "Guard Dog" (番犬, Banken); Lesson 665. "Flame of Life" (命の灯, Inochi no Hi)
74	Farewell; Abayo (あばよ)	August 3, 2018; 978-4-08-881537-4	—
Lesson 666. "The Creatures Called Humans" (人間という生物, Ningen to Iu Ikimono); Lesson 667. "Undying and Unyielding" (不滅と不屈, Fumetsu to Fukutsu); Lesson 668. "Those that Save" (救う者, Sukuu Mono); Lesson 669. "Farewell" (あばよ, Abayo); Lesson 670. "Signboard" (看板, Kanban); Lesson 671. "Revolutionary" (革命児, Kakumeiji); Lesson 672. "Be Careful With Cryptocurrency" (仮想通貨に気をつけろ, Kasō Tsūka ni Ki o Tsukero); Lesson 673. "Ghost" (亡霊, Bōrei); Lesson 674. "2 Years For a Boy is 10 Years For a Man" (少女の2年は男の10年, Shōjo no Ni Nen wa Otoko no Jū Nen); Lesson 675. "Final Fantasy Happens in Live Action, Too" (実写でも最終回発情期は起こる, Jissha demo Fainaru Fantajī wa Okoru)
75	Save; Sukui (救い)	October 4, 2018; 978-4-08-881588-6	—
Lesson 676. "If Boys did Mogumogu Time, People Would Get Angry" (モグモグタイムは男子がやったら腹立つ, Mogumogu Taimu wa Danshi ga Yattara Hara Tatsu); Lesson 677. "The Culprit (Mastermind) is Yasu" (黒幕はヤス, Hannin wa Yasu); Lesson 678. "It's Not Just Donbee, All Food Has Yoshioka Riho in It" (どん兵衛だけじゃない 全ての食物に吉岡里帆は宿っている, Donbē Dake Janai Subete no Shokumotsu ni Yoshioka Riho wa Yadotteiru); Lesson 679. "No Dragon Holes Ventured, No Masters Gained" (龍穴に入らずんば師を得ず, Ryūketsu ni Irazunba Shi o Ezu); Lesson 680. "Save" (救い, Sukui); Lesson 681. "Phoenix" (鳳凰, Hōō); Lesson 682. "The World's Enemy" (世界の敵, Sekai no Teki); Lesson 683. "Watch Out for Hamichin" (ハミチンに気をつけろ, Hamichin no Ki o Tsukero); Lesson 684. "The Trick to Dieting is to not Always Strain Yourself, Sometimes Give Yourself a Treat" (ダイエットのコツは試練だけじゃなくご褒美も与えること, Daietto no Kotsu wa Shiren Dake Janaku Go Hōbi mo Ataeru Koto); Lesson 685. "KUWAH!" (くわっ, Kuwa')
76	Those Days; Ano Koro (あの日常)	January 4, 2019; 978-4-08-881713-2	—
Lesson 686. "Even for Villains, There Are Things That Are Okay to Do and Things That Are Not Okay to Do" (悪役にもやっていい事と悪い事がある, Akuyaku ni mo Yatte Ii Koto to Warui Koto ga Aru); Lesson 687. "Buy Extra Copies of Number 61" (61番は多めに買っておけ, Roku Jū Ichi Ban wa Ōme ni Katteoke); Lesson 688. "Buy Extra Mosaic Screen Tones, Too" (モザイクトーンも多めに買っておけ, Mozaiku Tōn mo Ōme ni Katteoke); Lesson 689. "Hot Water Calms the Soul" (白湯は心が落ち着く, Sayu wa Kokoro ga Ochitsuku); Lesson 690. "Appearances Are Important No Matter What You're Doing" (何をするにも見た目は大事, Nani o Suru ni mo Mita Me wa Daiji); Lesson 691. "Pure White" (まっしろ, Masshiro); Lesson 692. "Lost Child" (迷子, Maigo); Lesson 693. "UHO" (ウホ, Uho); Lesson 694. "Gorilla Comes From the Gorilla And is More Gorilla Than Gorilla" (ゴリラはゴリラより出でてゴリラよりゴリラ, Gorira wa Gorira yori Idete Gorira yori Gorira); Lesson 695. "Those Days" (あの日常, Ano Koro)
77	Nobody with a Natural Perm is a Decent Guy; Tennen Pāma ni Roku na Yatsu wa Inai (天然パーマにロクな奴はいない)	August 2, 2019; 978-4-08-881720-0	—
Lesson 696. "Cheap Sake" (安酒, Yasuzake); Lesson 697. "A Myriad of Threads" (万の絆, Yorozu no Ito); Lesson 698. "Go Beyond the Final Chapter" (最終回を越えて行け, Saishū Kai o Koete Yuke); Lesson 699. "Sakata Gintoki and his Comrades" (坂田銀時と仲間たち, Sakata Gintoki to Nakama Tachi); Lesson 700. "Steel Heart" (鋼の心臓, Hagane no Shinzō); Lesson 701. "Homing Instinct" (帰巣, Kisō); Lesson 702. "Fate" (宿命, Shukumei); Lesson 703. "The Right Eye" (右目, Migi Me); Lesson 704. "Nobody with a Natural Perm is a Decent Guy" (天然パーマにロクな奴はいない, Tennen Pāma ni Roku na Yatsu wa Inai)
