= Kime =

Japanese martial arts term

Kime (Japanese: 決め) is a Japanese word. It is the noun form of the verb "kimeru," which means "to decide,". (Random House, 1996, Japanese-English, English-Japanese Dictionary, p. 126).

Kime is a commonly used Japanese martial arts term. In karate, it can mean "power" and/or "focus," describing the instantaneous tensing at the correct moment during a technique. The tension at this time is mostly focused on the dantian ("hara") and abdomen. In judo, the "Kime-no-kata" is often translated to "Kata of Decision." In other budō, the term refers to attacking a pressure point.
