= Ansan (karate) =

Style of karate

Ansan (安三) is a karate kata with uncertain origin. It may have originated from either the Tomari-te style or the Naha-te style and is also known as Yantsu. It is a bunkai form practiced mainly in the Shito-ryu and Kyokushin schools.
