= Ansan (Gangwon) =

Mountain in Gangwon, South Korea

Highest point
- Elevation: 300 m (980 ft)
- Coordinates: 38.14°N 128.33°E

Geography
- Location: San 1-1, Han-gye-ri, Buk-myeon, Inje County, Gangwon Province, South Korea

Korean name
- Hangul: 안산
- Hanja: 鞍山
- RR: Ansan
- MR: Ansan

Ansan (Korean: 안산) is a mountain in Inje County, Gangwon Province, South Korea. It is in the northwestern area of Seoraksan National Park. It has an elevation of 300 m (984 ft).

== See also ==
- List of mountains in Korea
