= Anshan (disambiguation) =

Anshan is a city in Liaoning province, PR China

Anshan may also refer to :

- Anshan (Persia), an ancient Persian capital
- Izeh, a city in Izeh County, Khuzestan Province, Iran
- Anshan, Hebei, China
- Anshan-class destroyer
  - Chinese destroyer Anshan (101)
- 3136 Anshan, a main-belt asteroid
- A commonly used word for a hunger strike in India

== See also ==
- Ansan (disambiguation)
