= Weightlifting =

Sport or exercise

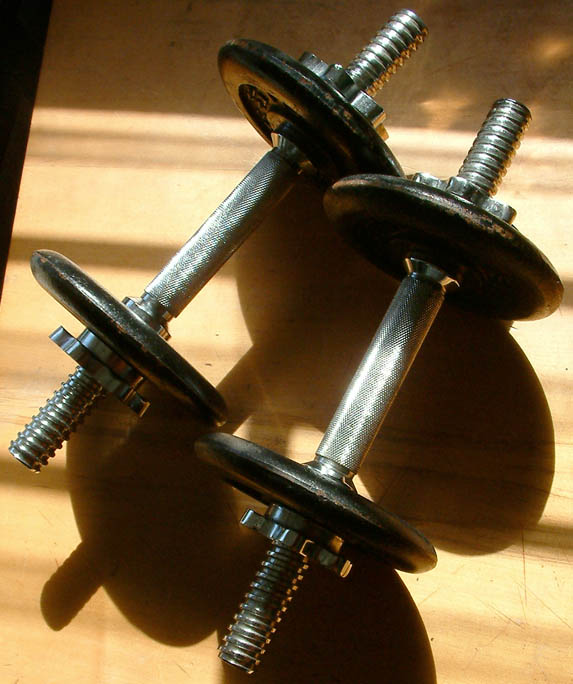
A pair of adjustable dumbbells with 2-kilogram (4.4 lb) plates

Weightlifting or weight lifting refers to physical exercises and sports in which people lift weights, often in the form of dumbbells, barbells, or machines. People engage in weightlifting for a variety of reasons. These can include: developing physical strength; promoting health and fitness; competing in weightlifting sports; and developing a muscular and aesthetic physique.

Olympic weightlifting is a specific type of weightlifting sport practiced at the Olympic Games, commonly referred to simply as "weightlifting". Other weightlifting sports include stone lifting, powerlifting, kettlebell lifting, and para powerlifting—the weightlifting sport practiced at the Paralympic Games. Different weightlifting sports may be distinguished by the different ways of lifting a weight, or the objects lifted. Weightlifting events are key elements of strength athletics.

Weight training is weightlifting to develop physical strength or a muscular physique. It is a common part of strength conditioning for athletes in many sports. When the primary goal is to develop an all-round muscular physique, this is bodybuilding. People who train with weights utilize both free weights (such as barbells, dumbbells, and kettlebells) and weight machines to train all parts of their bodies. A place and equipment for weight training is provided at gyms and leisure centres.

According to an article in The New York Times, lifting weights can prevent some disabilities, increase metabolism, and lower body fat. Using free weights, compared to machines, improves not only strength but muscle function as well, in high-functioning older adults.

== Weightlifting sports ==
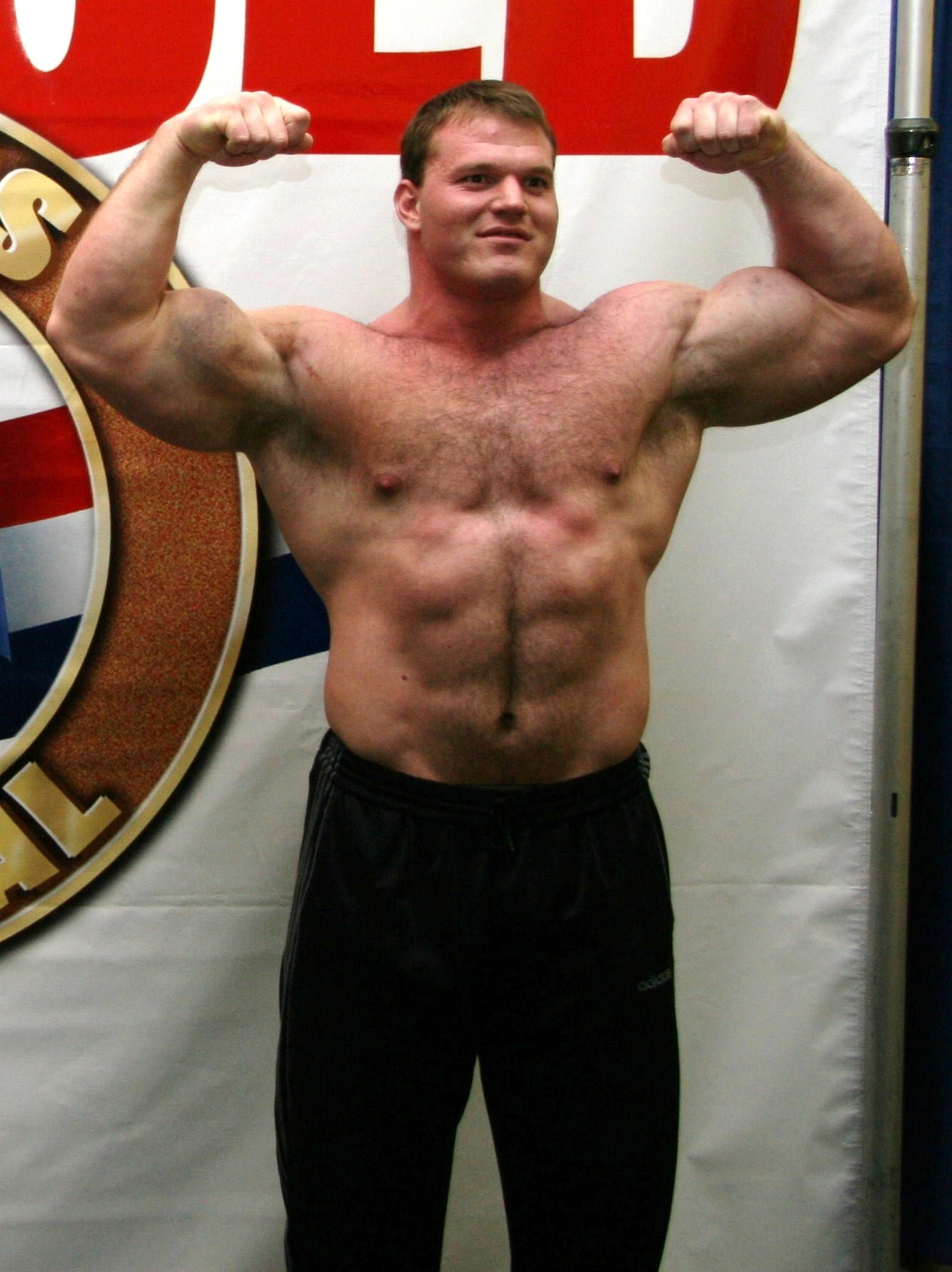
Competitive powerlifter Derek Poundstone, with the bulkier and less defined physique typical of the sport

Competitive weightlifting is believed to pre-date written history. There are records in many civilizations of feats of strength performed by great heroes, perhaps mythological, such as Heracles, Goliath, Orm Storolfsson and Milo of Croton. In Ancient China and Greece, men lifted stones to prove their strength and manhood. There is a tradition in Scotland of weight lifting competitions in Scottish Highland Gatherings, which have been annual events since the 1820s; and these contests are forerunners of modern strength athletics.

When in 1896 the modern international Olympic Games began, weight lifting was an event at the first Games; and since 1920 weightlifting has been a regular part of the Olympics. By 1932 the Olympic competition comprised three lifts, all of which are different ways of lifting a weighted barbell from ground to overhead: namely the snatch, the clean and jerk, and the clean and press. The snatch is a wide-grip lift, in which the barbell is lifted overhead in one motion. The clean and jerk and the clean and press are combination lifts in which the weight is first taken from the ground to the front of the shoulders (the clean), and then from the shoulders to overhead (the first using a jerk, the second an overhead press). After 1972 the clean and press was discontinued because of difficulties in judging proper form. Today, the snatch and the clean and jerk are together known as the "olympic lifts"; and the sport of weightlifting as practiced at the Olympics can be called "olympic weightlifting" or "olympic-style weightlifting" to distinguish it from other weightlifting sports (wherever it is practiced). Its international governing body is the International Weightlifting Federation, which was founded in 1905.

The 1950s and 1960s saw the sport of powerlifting developing, originating in competitions where athletes competed in different lifting events to those at the Olympics. These different lifts were sometimes called "odd lifts". Previously, the weightlifting governing bodies in the United Kingdom and the United States had recognized various "odd lifts" for competition and record purposes. Eventually these competitions became standardized to three specific lifts: the squat, bench press, and deadlift; and this form of weightlifting sport was given its distinct name of powerlifting, with the International Powerlifting Federation being formed in 1972 to regulate and promote the sport.

In 1964 weightlifting debuted in the Paralympic Games, in the form of the bench press; and since the 1992 Games has been called powerlifting, specifically Para powerlifting or Paralympic powerlifting.

== Weightlifting for strength and appearance ==
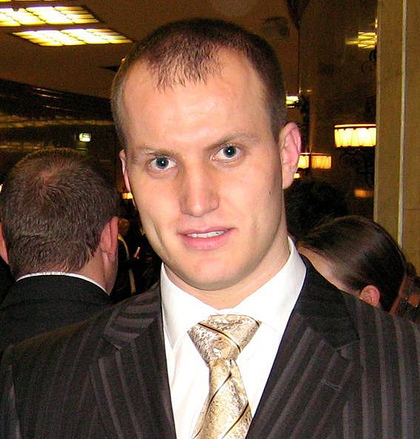
Powerlifter Marcin Dolega

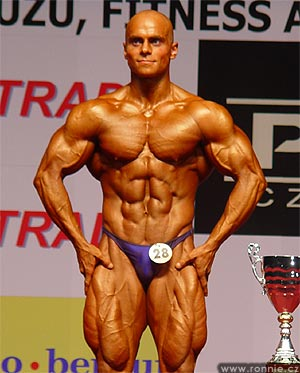
Bodybuilder Lukáš Osladil posing onstage with a variation of the most muscular pose

Strength training is also recorded as far back as ancient Greek and ancient Persian times. Weightlifting is used as an end to achieve different goals. For example, in weight training, a type of exercise using weights to increase muscle strength, and in bodybuilding, a form of body modification for aesthetic reasons. Strength training, bodybuilding, and working out to achieve a general level of physical fitness have all historically been closely associated with weightlifting. Because the goal of bodybuilding is often to generate a particular appearance, a person who engages in weightlifting only to increase strength, or for competitive purposes, may not achieve the physical appearance sought in bodybuilding. Weight training aims to build muscle by prompting two different types of hypertrophy: sarcoplasmic and myofibrillar. Sarcoplasmic hypertrophy leads to larger muscles and so is favored by bodybuilders more than myofibrillar hypertrophy, which builds athletic strength. Sarcoplasmic hypertrophy is triggered by increasing repetitions, whereas myofibrillar hypertrophy is triggered by lifting heavier weight.

Weightlifting purely to develop physical strength can lead to the development of a very different body type than weightlifting for bodybuilding, with powerlifters and Olympic weightlifters tending to have endo-mesomorphic bodies, and bodybuilders tending to be more mesomorphic. The two main methods of weight lifting to build strength and muscle mass are hypertrophy and overload. Training for muscle size is usually done by achieving hypertrophy which is training with a lighter weight at higher volume or more repetitions. Muscle size increases due to metabolic fibers that result in visible muscle mass growth. Training muscles to build strength is typically achieved by the overload method. Overload involves training with increasing weight at each set. It can also mean increasing volume of repetitions at the same weight for each set. Both overload methods are optimal for building muscle mass and strength, however, lifting heavy weights at a lower volume or less repetitions is optimal for building strength.

It has historically been observed that weightlifting both for health and for appearance is substantially more common among men than among women. A primary reason for this dichotomy has been a desire among women to avoid developing an appearance that is perceived as physically masculine, with a consequent focus on aerobic exercises over weightlifting activities. Another factor that has been suggested is that women who are interested in lifting weights tend to be uncomfortable in spaces dominated by men, which has been observed to cause women who do want to lift weights to take weights from the weight room to another part of the gym to work out, therefore using smaller weights and for shorter times. The prevalence of males in weightlifting is reinforced by marketing that depicts weightlifting as a primarily male activity. In recent times however, the practice of bodybuilding has become more feminized. Some gyms have reported that the female percentage of their clientele has risen to over 50%. Some gyms have also incorporated designated female only areas. A new common trend among women is the replacement of cardio regimes with weightlifting for several reasons such as pursuing their idea of a perfect body, female empowerment, and plain enjoyment.

== Health benefits ==
Weightlifting is beneficial for health. Weightlifting induces the production of collagen proteins which helps build structure and strength of tendons and ligaments. It also is optimal for promoting and improving joint stability. Weightlifting can also increase metabolism and increases resting metabolic rate. This means the body can burn calories faster and the body uses those calories to increase and build muscle mass. However, it is possible to engage in a training regimen for any of these purpose using exercises or equipment other than weights.

== Weightlifter injuries ==
Weightlifters are prone to various injuries, and understanding common lifting weights injuries is important for the prevention and effective management of the risk of injury. A study found that the most common weightlifting injuries (64.8%) occurred in the back (especially the lower back), knees, and shoulders.

== See also ==
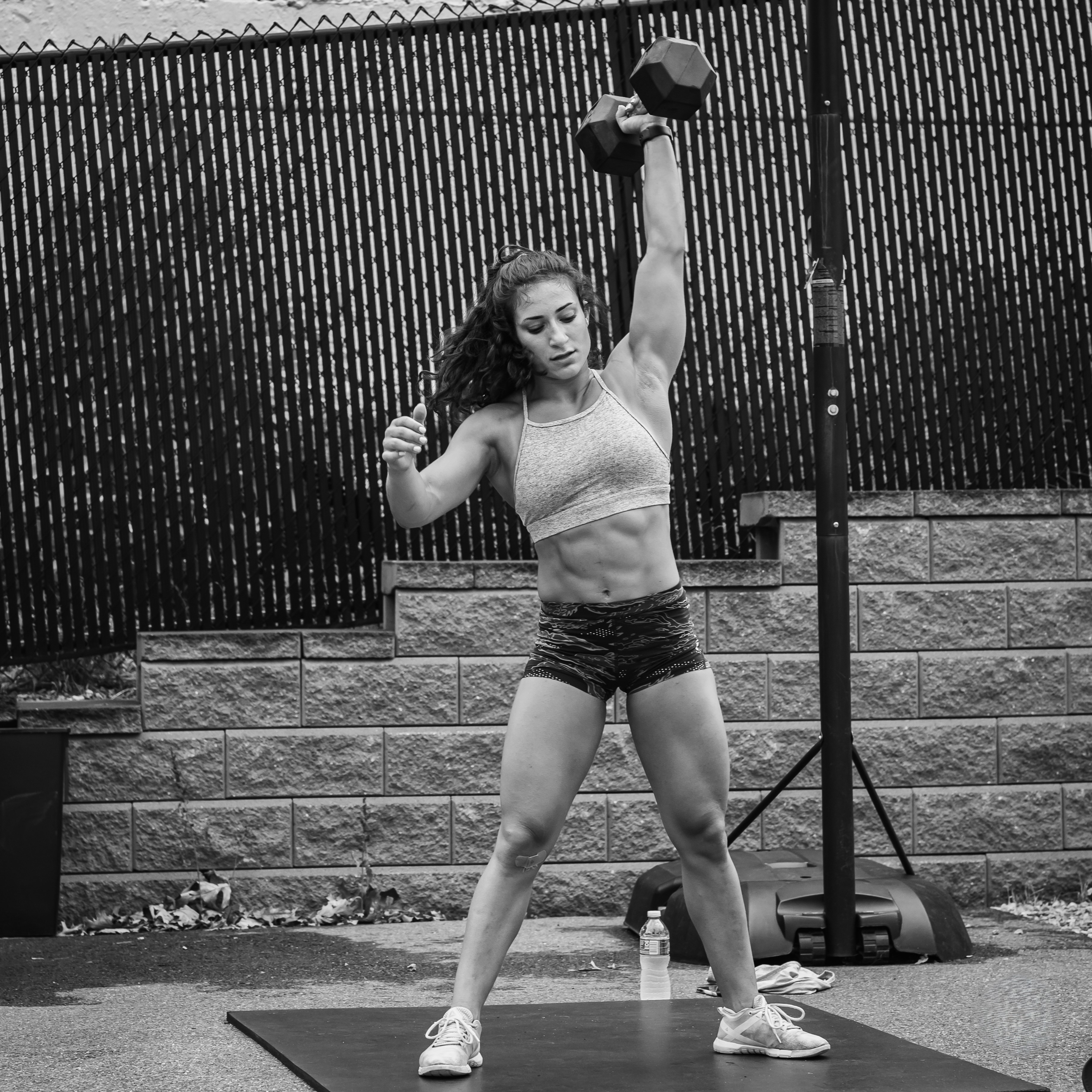
Woman lifting weights

- Bodybuilding
- CrossFit
- Olympic weightlifting
- Manual handling of loads
- Powerlifting
- Strength athletics
- Strength training
- Strongman
- Two Hands Anyhow
- Unilateral training
