= Quadzilla =

Quadzilla may refer to:

- A. J. Dillon (born 1998), American former Boston College and current Philadelphia Eagles running back
- Paul Demayo (1967–2005), American professional bodybuilder
- Robert Förstemann (born 1986), track cyclist
- Tom Platz (born 1955), American professional bodybuilder
- Suzuki LT500R (1987-1990) fastest two-stroke quad made stock
- Mo Sanders (born 1971), American roller skater
- Spencer Strider (born 1998), American baseball pitcher, currently on the Atlanta Braves
- Jordan Watson (born 1987), English Muay Thai kickboxer
- A racing waterslide at Noah's Ark Water Park in Wisconsin
