= Lionel Strongfort =

German bodybuilder, wrestler and author (1876–1967)

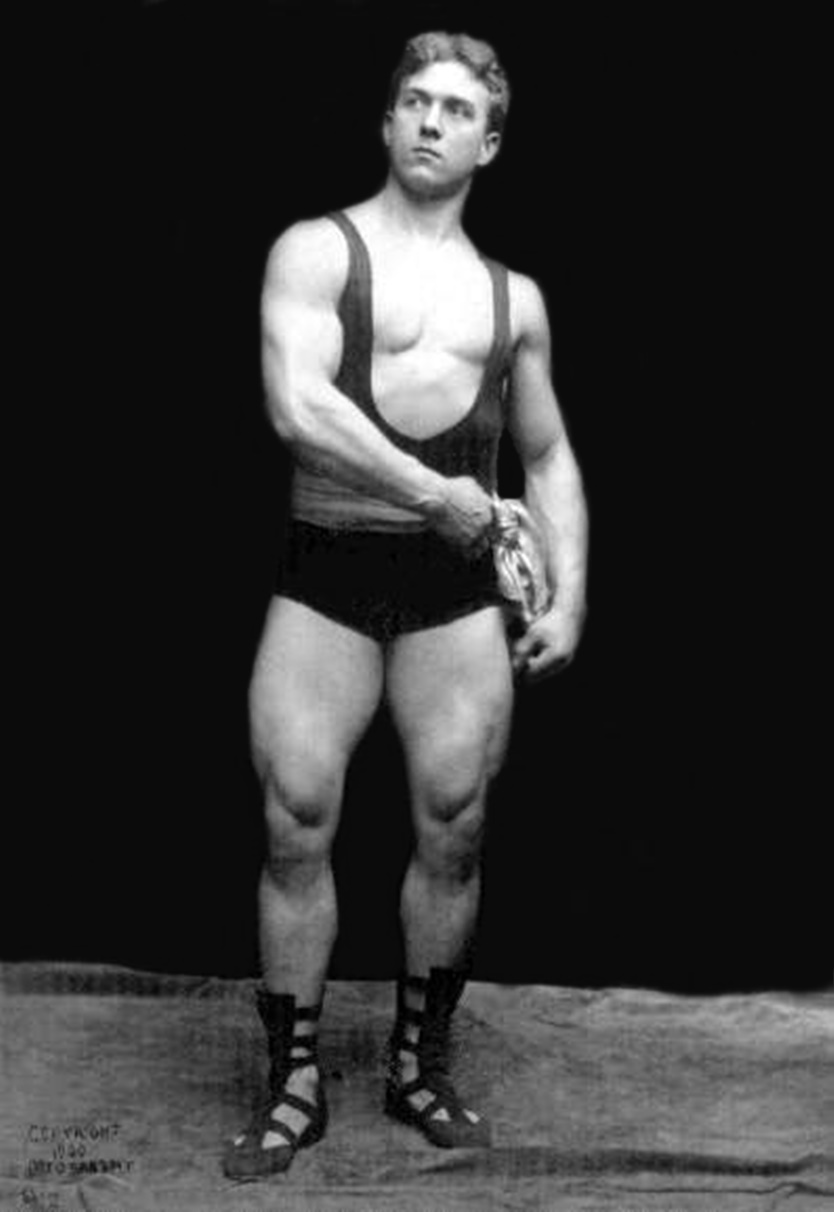
- Born: 23 November 1876; Berlin
- Died: 27 November 1967 (aged 89)
- Occupation: Bodybuilder

Max Unger (23 November 1876 – 27 November 1967), known as Lionel Strongfort, was a German bodybuilder, wrestler and author of the correspondence physical exercise course, known as the Strongfort System of Physical Culture, or Strongfortism.

== Biography ==
Strongfort was born in Berlin on 23 November 1876. He worked as a watch and clockmakers apprentice. A turning point in the life of the young, sixteen-year-old was a meeting with German strongman Louis Attila. He immediately noticed the potential of the young man and encouraged him to attend his trainings. After a year Strongfort achieved a phenomenal form (at the age of seventeen, with one hand he lifted over his head a weight of 130 pounds). In addition to lifting weights, he also practiced boxing, wrestling and other sports. He defeated Turkish wrestlers - Yusuf İsmail and Adali Halil, who at that time were doing a world tour. He also adopted the stage nickname Lionel Strongfort and began his own series of shows in vaudeville and circus productions around the world. He also posed for sculptors and photographers. Strongfort claimed to possess the world record in the bent press with 312 pounds.

The thing that brought him the greatest fame was the "Human Bridge Act", based only on his arms and legs he kept the weight of the bridge through which he drove a car with six passengers. In the first years of the twentieth century, he stopped showing, settled in the USA and took up the correspondence course, sales of books, sports equipment and dietary supplements.

He established the Max Unger Health and Strength Institute in New York City around 1915, and later the Strongfort Institute in New Jersey. He launched a mail-order health training system that continued into the 1930s. Similar to Eugen Sandow and other strongmen of the period, Strongfort equated the muscular male body with heterosexuality. In his book Do It With Muscle!, he commented that "it is a wise law of nature that woman shall ever be drawn to the strong and vital man."

== Vegetarianism ==
Strongfort was a lacto-ovo vegetarian. He recommended a diet that consisted of fruit, vegetables, grains, milk and eggs. In 1909, Strongfort issued a challenge in the Physical Culture magazine to Strongman Arthur Saxon. Saxon believed that meat was essential to gain strength. He was particularly fond of beef and ate it three times a day. As a vegetarian, Strongfort disputed this and challenged Saxon to a weight-lifting contest to prove the superiority of a meat-free diet. The challenged was not answered.

== Publications ==
- Intelligence in Physical Culture (1910)
- Promotion & Conservation of Health, Strength & Mental Energy (1919)
- The Strength of a Hercules and How to Obtain It (1920)
- Do It With Muscle! (1924)
- Life's Energy Through Strongfortism (1928)

== See also ==
- Bernarr Macfadden
- Alois P. Swoboda
