= Bodybuilding =

Control and development of musculature

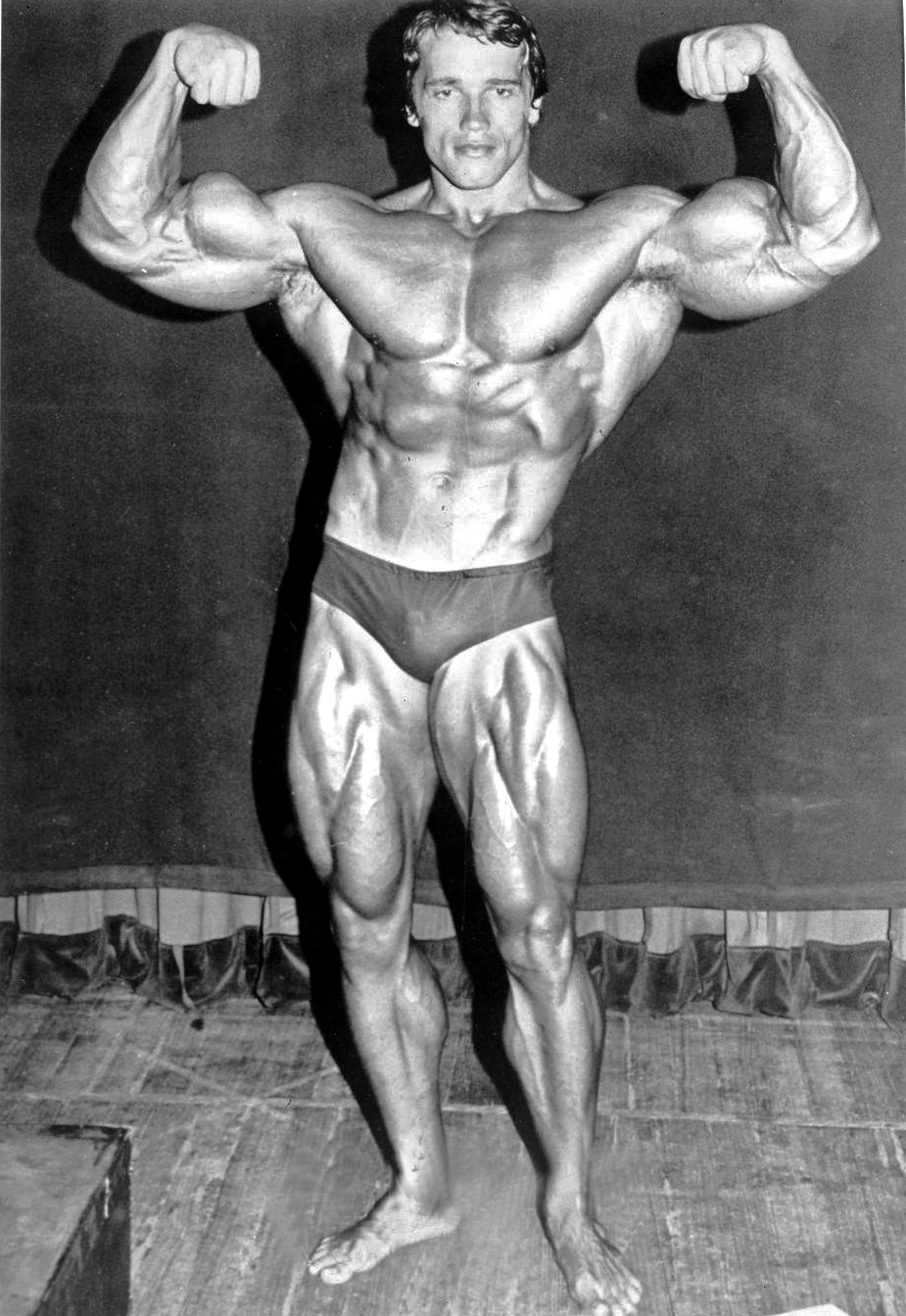
- Arnold Schwarzenegger, one of the most famous figures in bodybuilding, 1974
- Highest governing body: International Federation of BodyBuilding & Fitness
- Nicknames: BB
- First developed: England, late 19th century

Characteristics
- Contact: No
- Team members: No
- Mixed-sex: No
- Type: Indoor
- Venue: Auditorium

Presence
- Country or region: Worldwide
- Olympic: No
- Paralympic: No
- World Games: 1981–2009

Bodybuilding is the practice of progressive resistance exercise to build, control, and develop one's muscles via hypertrophy. An individual who engages in this activity is referred to as a bodybuilder.

In competitive bodybuilding, competitors appear onstage in lineups and perform specified poses (and later individual posing routines) for a panel of judges who rank them based on conditioning, muscularity, posing, size, stage presentation, and symmetry. Bodybuilders prepare for competitions by exercising and eliminating non-essential body fat. This is enhanced at the final stage by a combination of carbohydrate loading and dehydration to achieve maximum muscle definition and vascularity. Most bodybuilders also tan and shave their bodies prior to competition.

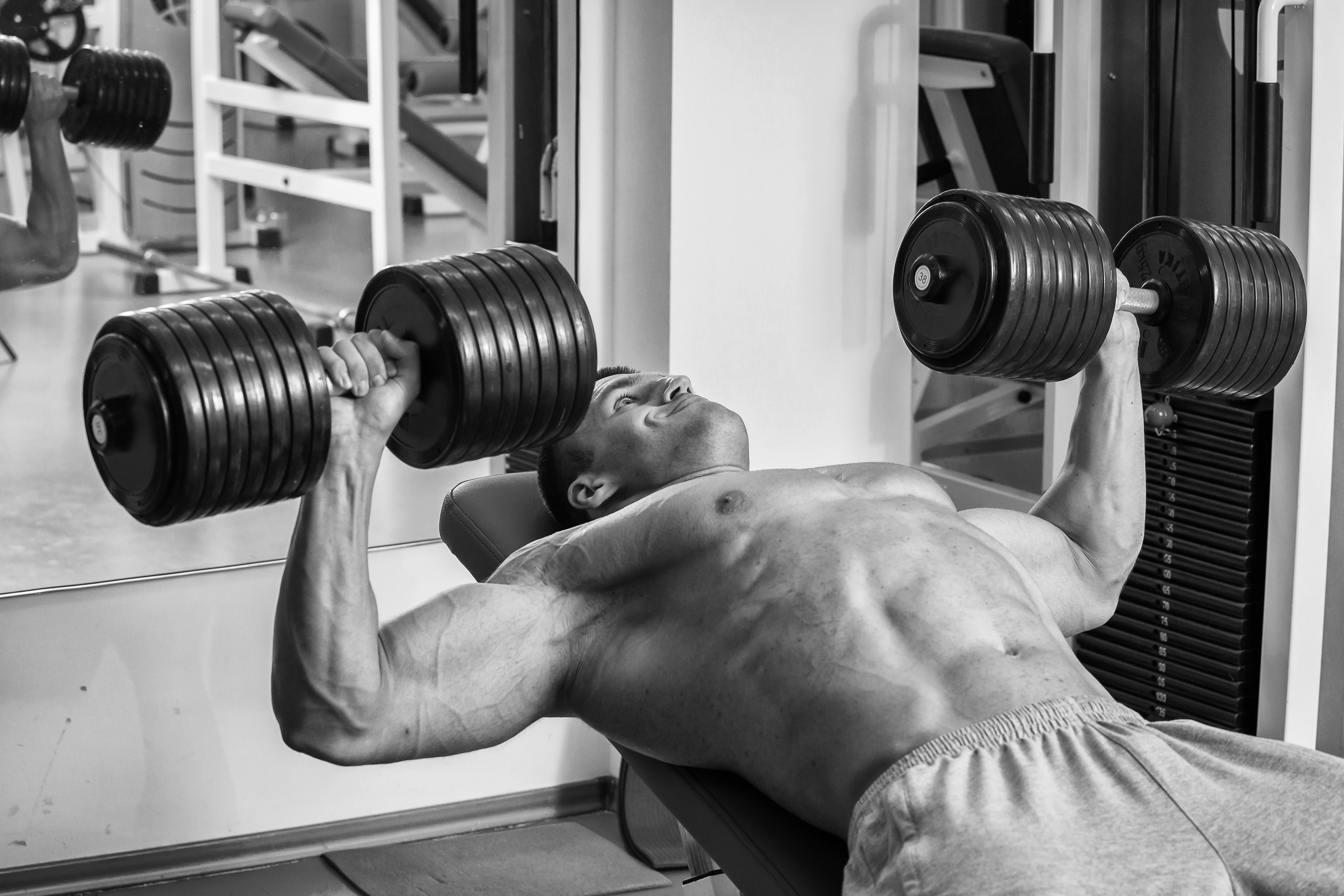
A bodybuilder performs the incline dumbbell press.

Bodybuilding requires significant time and effort to reach the desired results. A novice bodybuilder may be able to gain 8–15 pounds (4–7 kg) of muscle per year if they lift weights for seven hours per week, but muscle gains begin to slow down after the first two years to about 5–15 pounds (2–7 kg) per year. After five years, gains can decrease to as little as 3–10 pounds (1–5 kg) per year. Some bodybuilders use anabolic steroids and other performance-enhancing drugs to build muscles and recover from injuries faster. However, using performance-enhancing drugs can have serious health risks. Furthermore, most competitions prohibit the use of these substances. Despite some calls for drug testing to be implemented, the National Physique Committee (considered the leading amateur bodybuilding federation) does not require testing.

The winner of the annual IFBB Mr. Olympia contest is recognized as the world's top male professional bodybuilder. Since 1950, the NABBA Universe Championships have been considered the top amateur bodybuilding contests, with notable winners including Ronnie Coleman, Jay Cutler, Steve Reeves, and Arnold Schwarzenegger.

== History ==
=== Early history ===
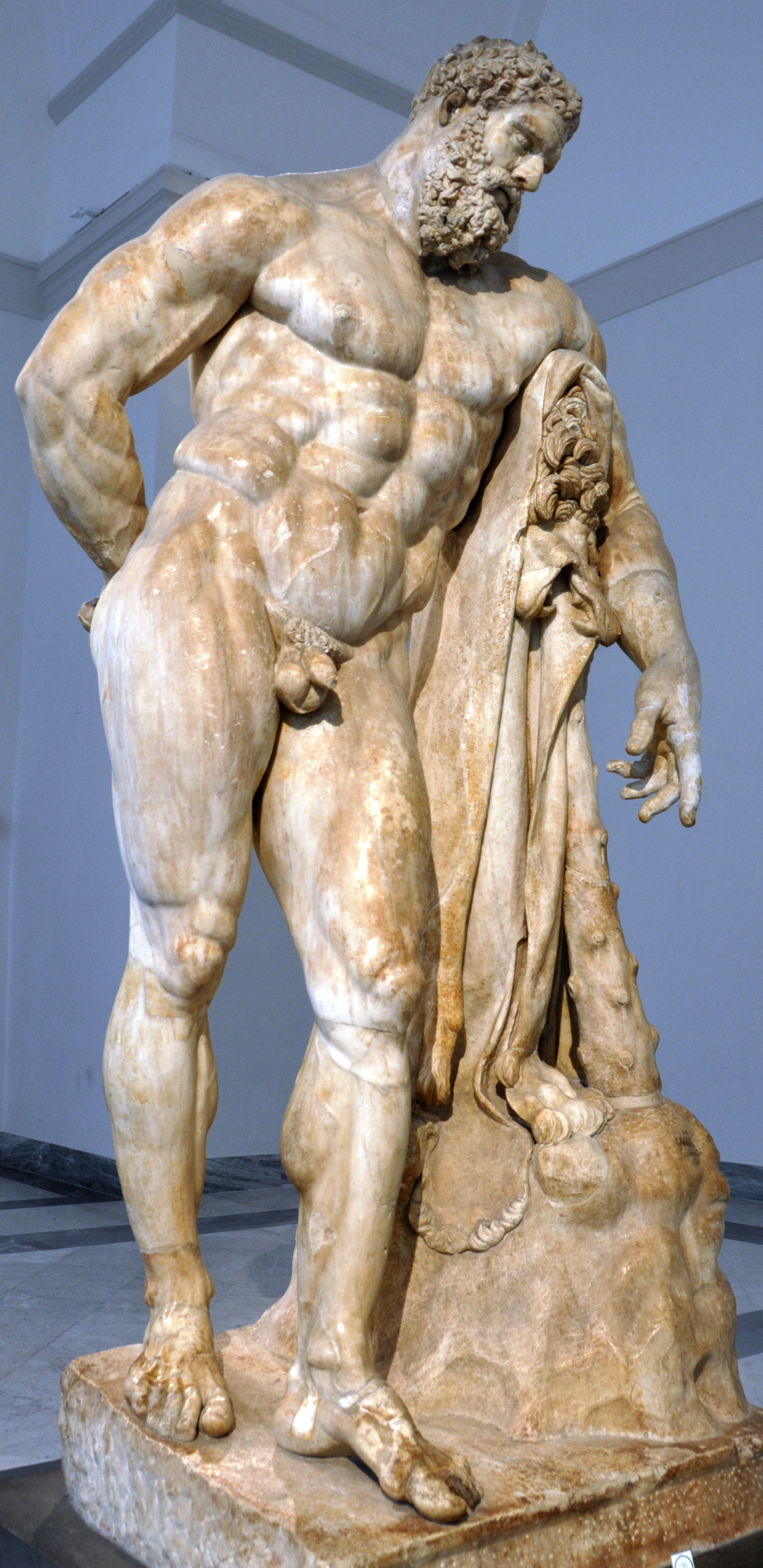
The Farnese Hercules, 216 AD

Stone-lifting competitions were practiced in ancient Egypt, Greece, and Tamilakam.

Western weightlifting developed in Europe from 1880 to 1953, with strongmen displaying feats of strength for the public and challenging each other. The focus was not on their physique, and they possessed relatively large bellies and fatty limbs compared to bodybuilders of today.

==== Eugen Sandow ====
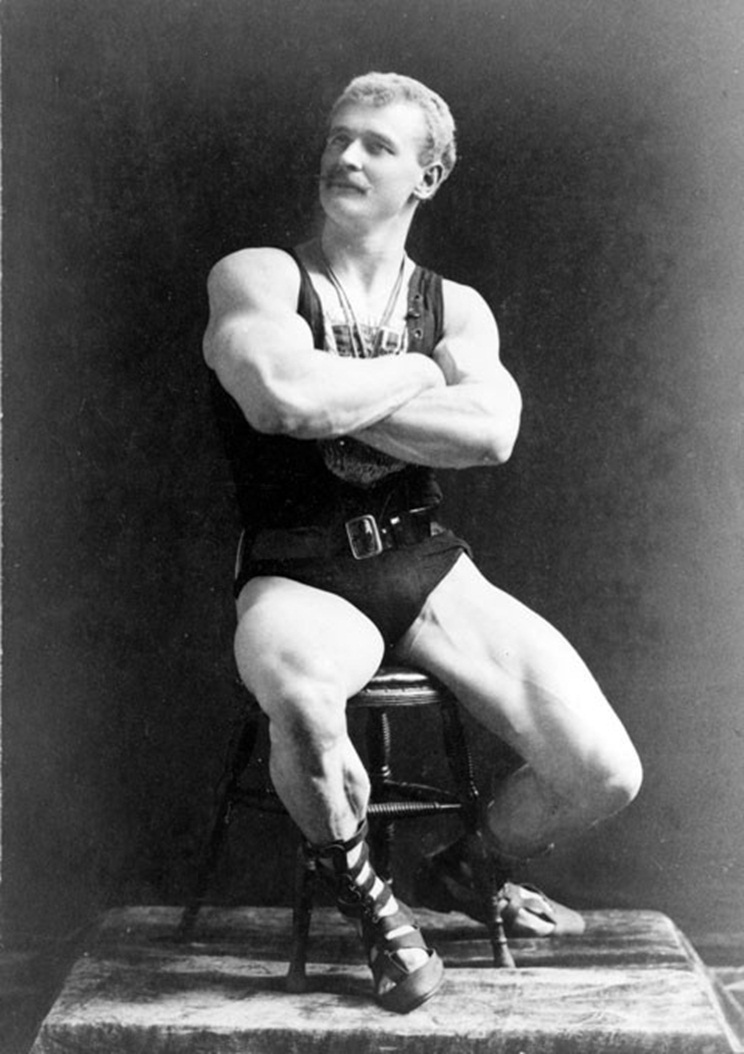
Eugen Sandow, often referred to as the "Father of Modern Bodybuilding"

Bodybuilding developed in the late 19th century, promoted in England by the German Eugen Sandow, now considered as the "Father of Modern Bodybuilding". He allowed audiences to enjoy viewing his physique in "muscle display performances". Although audiences were thrilled to see a well-developed physique, the men simply displayed their bodies as part of strength demonstrations or wrestling matches. Sandow had a stage show built around these displays through his manager, Florenz Ziegfeld. The Oscar-winning 1936 musical film The Great Ziegfeld depicts the beginning of modern bodybuilding, when Sandow began to display his body for carnivals.

Sandow was so successful at flexing and posing his physique that he later created several businesses around his fame, and was among the first to market products branded with his name. He was credited with inventing and selling the first exercise equipment for the masses: machined dumbbells, spring pulleys, and tension bands. Even his image was sold by the thousands in "cabinet cards" and other prints.

==== First large-scale bodybuilding competition ====
Sandow organized the first bodybuilding contest on September 14, 1901, called the "Great Competition". It was held at the Royal Albert Hall in London. Judged by Sandow, Sir Charles Lawes, and Sir Arthur Conan Doyle, the contest was a great success and many bodybuilding enthusiasts were turned away due to the overwhelming number of audience members. The trophy presented to the winner was a gold statue of Sandow sculpted by Frederick Pomeroy. The winner was William L. Murray of Nottingham. The silver Sandow trophy was presented to second-place winner D. Cooper. The bronze Sandow trophy—now the most famous of all—was presented to third-place winner A.C. Smythe. In 1950, this same bronze trophy was presented to Steve Reeves for winning the inaugural NABBA Mr. Universe contest. It would not resurface again until 1977 when the winner of the IFBB Mr. Olympia contest, Frank Zane, was presented with a replica of the bronze trophy. Since then, Mr. Olympia winners have been consistently awarded a replica of the bronze Sandow.

The first large-scale bodybuilding competition in America took place from December 28, 1903, to January 2, 1904, at Madison Square Garden in New York City. The competition was promoted by Bernarr Macfadden, the father of physical culture and publisher of original bodybuilding magazines such as Health & Strength. The winner was Al Treloar, who was declared "The Most Perfectly Developed Man in the World". Treloar won a thousand dollar cash prize, a substantial sum at that time. Two weeks later, Thomas Edison made a film of Treloar's posing routine. Edison had also made two films of Sandow a few years before. Those were the first three motion pictures featuring a bodybuilder. In the early 20th century, Macfadden and Charles Atlas continued to promote bodybuilding across the world.

==== Notable early bodybuilders ====
Many other important bodybuilders in the early history of bodybuilding prior to 1930 include: Earle Liederman (writer of some of bodybuilding's earliest books), Zishe Breitbart, George Hackenschmidt, Emy Nkemena, George F. Jowett, Finn Hateral (a pioneer in the art of posing), Frank Saldo, Monte Saldo, William Bankier, Launceston Elliot, Sig Klein, Sgt. Alfred Moss, Joe Nordquist, Lionel Strongfort ("Strongfortism"), Gustav Frištenský, Ralph Parcaut (a champion wrestler who also authored an early book on "physical culture"), and Alan P. Mead (who became a muscle champion despite the fact that he lost a leg in World War I). Actor Francis X. Bushman, who was a disciple of Sandow, started his career as a bodybuilder and sculptor's model before beginning his famous silent movie career.

=== 1950s–1960s ===
Bodybuilding became more popular in the 1950s and 1960s with the emergence of strength and gymnastics champions, and the simultaneous popularization of bodybuilding magazines, training principles, nutrition for bulking up and cutting down, the use of protein and other food supplements, and the opportunity to enter physique contests. The number of bodybuilding organizations grew, and most notably the International Federation of Bodybuilders (IFBB) was founded in 1946 by Canadian brothers Joe and Ben Weider. Other bodybuilding organizations included the Amateur Athletic Union (AAU), National Amateur Bodybuilding Association (NABBA), and the World Bodybuilding Guild (WBBG). Consequently, the contests grew both in number and in size. Besides the many "Mr. XXX" (insert town, city, state, or region) championships, the most prestigious titles were Mr. America, Mr. World, Mr. Universe, Mr. Galaxy, and ultimately Mr. Olympia, which was started in 1965 by the IFBB and is now considered the most important bodybuilding competition in the world.

During the 1950s, the most successful and most famous competing bodybuilders were Bill Pearl, Reg Park, Leroy Colbert, and Clarence Ross. Certain bodybuilders rose to fame thanks to the relatively new medium of television, as well as cinema. The most notable were Jack LaLanne, Steve Reeves, Reg Park, and Mickey Hargitay. While there were well-known gyms throughout the country during the 1950s (such as Vince's Gym in North Hollywood, California, and Vic Tanny's chain gyms), there were still segments of the United States that had no "hardcore" bodybuilding gyms until the advent of Gold's Gym in the mid-1960s. Finally, the famed Muscle Beach in Santa Monica continued its popularity as the place to be for witnessing acrobatic acts, feats of strength, and the like. The movement grew more in the 1960s with increased TV and movie exposure, as bodybuilders were typecast in popular shows and movies.

=== 1970s–1990s ===
==== New organizations ====
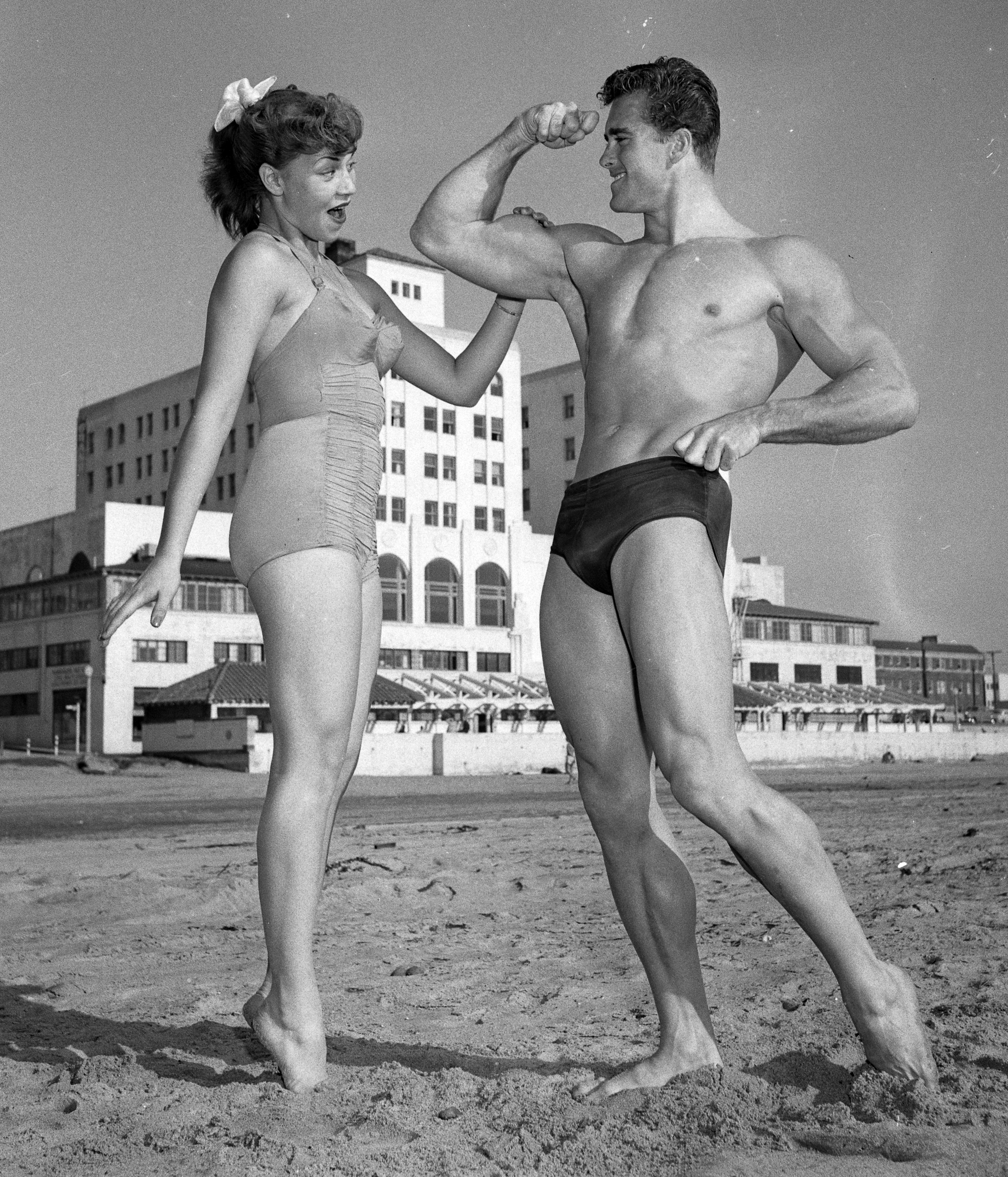
Ed Fury posing with model Jackie Coey in 1953

In the 1970s, bodybuilding had major publicity thanks to the appearance of Arnold Schwarzenegger, Franco Columbu, Lou Ferrigno, Mike Mentzer and others in the 1977 docudrama Pumping Iron. By this time, the IFBB dominated the competitive bodybuilding landscape and the Amateur Athletic Union (AAU) took a back seat. The National Physique Committee (NPC) was formed in 1981 by Jim Manion, who had just stepped down as chairman of the AAU Physique Committee. The NPC has gone on to become the most successful bodybuilding organization in the United States and is the amateur division of the IFBB. The late 1980s and early 1990s saw the decline of AAU-sponsored bodybuilding contests. In 1999, the AAU voted to discontinue its bodybuilding events.

==== Anabolic/androgenic steroid use ====
This period also saw the rise of anabolic steroids in bodybuilding and many other sports. More significant use began with Arnold Schwarzenegger, Sergio Oliva, and Lou Ferrigno in the late 1960s and early 1970s, and continuing through the 1980s with Lee Haney, the 1990s with Dorian Yates, Ronnie Coleman, and Markus Rühl, and up to the present day. Bodybuilders such as Greg Kovacs attained mass and size never seen previously but were not successful at the pro level. Others were renowned for their spectacular development of a particular body part, like Tom Platz or Paul Demayo for their leg muscles. At the time of shooting Pumping Iron, Schwarzenegger, while never admitting to steroid use until long after his retirement, said, "You have to do anything you can to get the advantage in competition". He would later say that he did not regret using steroids.

To combat anabolic steroid use and in the hopes of becoming a member of the IOC, the IFBB introduced doping tests for both steroids and other banned substances. Although doping tests occurred, the majority of professional bodybuilders still used anabolic steroids for competition. During the 1970s, the use of anabolic steroids was openly discussed, partly due to the fact they were legal. In the Anabolic Steroids Control Act of 1990, the U.S. Congress placed anabolic steroids into Schedule III of the Controlled Substances Act (CSA). In Canada, steroids are listed under Schedule IV of the Controlled Drugs and Substances Act, enacted by the federal Parliament in 1996.

==== World Bodybuilding Federation ====
In 1990, professional wrestling promoter Vince McMahon attempted to form his own bodybuilding organization known as the World Bodybuilding Federation (WBF). It operated as a sister to the World Wrestling Federation (WWF, now WWE), which provided cross-promotion via its performers and personalities. Tom Platz served as the WBF's director of talent development, and announced the new organization during an ambush of that year's Mr. Olympia (which, unbeknownst to organizers, McMahon and Platz had attended as representatives of an accompanying magazine, Bodybuilding Lifestyles). It touted efforts to bring bigger prize money and more "dramatic" events to the sport of bodybuilding—which resulted in its championships being held as pay-per-view events with WWF-inspired sports entertainment features and showmanship. The organization signed high-valued contracts with a number of IFBB regulars.

The IFBB's inaugural championship in June 1991 (won by Gary Strydom) received mixed reviews. The WBF would be indirectly impacted by a steroid scandal involving the WWF, prompting the organization to impose a drug testing policy prior to the 1992 championship. The drug testing policy hampered the quality of the 1992 championship, while attempts to increase interest by hiring WCW wrestler Lex Luger as a figurehead (hosting a WBF television program on USA Network, and planning to make a guest pose during the 1992 championship before being injured in a motorcycle accident) and attempting to sign Lou Ferrigno (who left the organization shortly after the drug testing policy was announced) did not come to fruition. The second PPV received a minuscule audience, and the WBF dissolved only one month later in July 1992.

=== 2000s ===
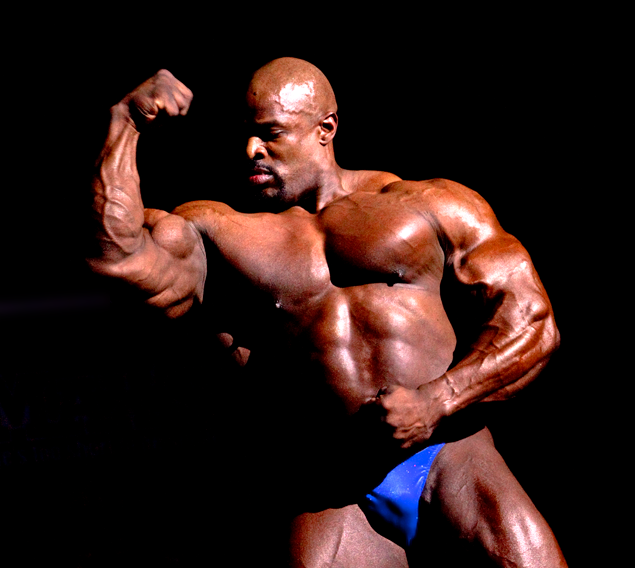
Eight-time Mr. Olympia Ronnie Coleman in October 2009

In 2003, Joe Weider sold Weider Publications to American Media, Inc. (AMI). The position of president of the IFBB was filled by Rafael Santonja following the death of Ben Weider in October 2008. In 2004, contest promoter Wayne DeMilia broke ranks with the IFBB and AMI took over the promotion of the Mr. Olympia contest: in 2017 AMI took the contest outright.

==== Olympic sport discussion ====
In the early 2000s, the IFBB sought to make bodybuilding an Olympic sport. It gained full IOC membership in 2000 and attempted to have bodybuilding approved as a demonstration event at the Olympics, with the hope that it would eventually become a full contest. However, this effort was unsuccessful, and Olympic recognition for bodybuilding remains controversial, as many argue that it is not truly a sport.

==== Social media ====
The advent of social media had a profound influence on fitness and bodybuilding. YouTube in particular has seen a surge in fitness content, ranging from gym vlogs to detailed discussions on workout attire. This not only provides consumers with an abundance of free resources to aid their fitness journey, but also creates a more informed consumer base.

Research has examined how fitness influencers affect people's intentions to exercise. A 2022 study involving two groups of participants, with 507 people in the first study and 445 in the second, found that an influencer's perceived ability to motivate viewers was associated with stronger intentions to exercise. The researchers also found that trustworthiness and expertise influenced how users evaluated fitness influencers, suggesting that social media personalities can play a role in encouraging physical activity.

Another growing trend with gym-related social media is the phenomenon of gym-shaming; a video posted by content creator Jessica Fernandez on Twitch that went viral showed her lifting weights in a gym while a man in the background stared at her, sparking a widespread debate about narcissism and an increasingly toxic gym culture in the age of social media. The video led to criticism of an emerging trend in which gyms, once known as places for focused workouts, are now being treated as filming locations for aspiring or established influencers with bystanders being unintentionally placed under the public eye in the process. Bodybuilder Joey Swoll, who voiced his concerns over this culture, addressed the controversy by stating that while harassment in gyms needs to be addressed, the man in Fernandez's video was not guilty of it. Although social media is giving more attention to the world of bodybuilding, there are still some areas that are controversial.

A 2025 study investigated the relationship between muscularity-focused social media content and muscle dysmorphia among 1,553 boys and men in Canada and the United States. The researchers found that more frequent exposure to content featuring muscular bodies, muscle-building supplements, and muscle-building drugs was associated with a greater likelihood of probable muscle dysmorphia. These associations remained after accounting for the amount of time participants spent on social media, suggesting that the type of content viewed may also be important.

Concerns are growing over the influence bodybuilding content on social media has on young adults and their perception of their own bodies, as they often compare themselves to gym influencers online. These concerns are further exacerbated by the lack of transparency around steroid use, since many influencers either avoid clarifying whether they are “natural” bodybuilders or outright deny accusations of being “enhanced.” This blurs the line between what can be achieved naturally and what requires anabolic steroids.

The issue is not limited to young people; adult lifters also face distorted body image from the content they consume, which can lead to an unhealthy relationship with nutrition and exercise. In some cases, this may contribute to mental health challenges such as body dysmorphia or eating disorders.

Recently, however, more influencers have begun to open up about their steroid use and advocate for greater transparency online. This shift has sparked ongoing debates about the risks of anabolic steroids. Many see this as a positive development, as it helps raise awareness and educates audiences about the effects, uses, and dangers of these substances.

Another widely discussed topic is mental health within bodybuilding, as the psychological challenges mentioned above can affect hobby lifters of all ages and backgrounds.

Researchers have also examined the role of social media influencers in the market for performance- and image-enhancing drugs. A 2023 study analyzed the online activities of 20 influencers who specialized in these substances and found that they promoted a range of products and services, some with questionable or potentially illegal status. Three of the selected influencers had more than one million followers. The findings raise concerns about the role of online fitness personalities in making performance-enhancing substances more visible and accessible to wider audiences.

== Areas ==
=== Professional bodybuilding ===
In the modern bodybuilding industry, the term "professional" generally means a bodybuilder who has won qualifying competitions as an amateur and has earned a "pro card" from their respective organization. Professionals earn the right to compete in competitions that include monetary prizes. A pro card also prohibits the athlete from competing in federations other than the one from which they have received the pro card. Depending on the level of success, these bodybuilders may receive monetary compensation from sponsors, much like athletes in other sports.

=== Natural bodybuilding ===
Due to the growing concerns of the high cost, health consequences, and illegal nature of some steroids, many organizations have formed in response and have deemed themselves "natural" bodybuilding competitions. In addition to the concerns noted, many promoters of bodybuilding have sought to shed the "freakish" perception that the general public has of bodybuilding and have successfully introduced a more mainstream audience to the sport of bodybuilding by including competitors whose physiques appear much more attainable and realistic.

In natural contests, the testing protocol ranges among organizations from lie detectors to urinalysis. Penalties vary between organisations, from suspensions to strict bans from competition. Natural organizations also have their own list of banned substances and it is important to refer to each organization's website for more information about which substances are banned from competition. There are many natural bodybuilding organizations; some of the larger ones include: MuscleMania, Ultimate Fitness Events (UFE), INBF/WNBF, and INBA/PNBA. These organizations either have an American or worldwide presence and are not limited to the country in which they are headquartered.

=== Men's physique ===
Due to those who found open-bodybuilding to be "too big" or "ugly" and unhealthy, a new category was started in 2013. The first Men's Physique Olympia winner was Mark Wingson, who was followed by Jeremy Buendia for four consecutive years. Like open-bodybuilding, the federations in which bodybuilders can compete are natural divisions as well as normal ones. The main difference between the two is that men's physique competitors pose in board shorts rather than a traditional posing suit and open-bodybuilders are much larger and are more muscular than the men's physique competitors. Open-bodybuilders have an extensive routine for posing while the Physique category is primarily judged by the front and back poses. Many of the men's physique competitors are not above 200 lbs and have a bit of a more attainable and aesthetic physique in comparison to open-bodybuilders. Although this category started off slowly, it has grown tremendously, and currently men's physique seems to be a more popular class than open-bodybuilding.

=== Classic physique ===
This is the middle ground of Men's Physique and Bodybuilding, a category that emphasizes symmetry, proportion, pleasing lines, and a small waist over size and mass. The competitors in this category are not nearly as big as Open class bodybuilders but not as small as Men's Physique competitors. They pose and perform in men's boxer briefs or posing trunks to show off the legs as in the Open class, unlike Men's Physique which hide the legs in board shorts. The judging criteria also looks to see certain poses emphasized, such as ones accentuating the vacuum to illustrate a tapered torso and lack of the infamous bloated gut of Open bodybuilding.

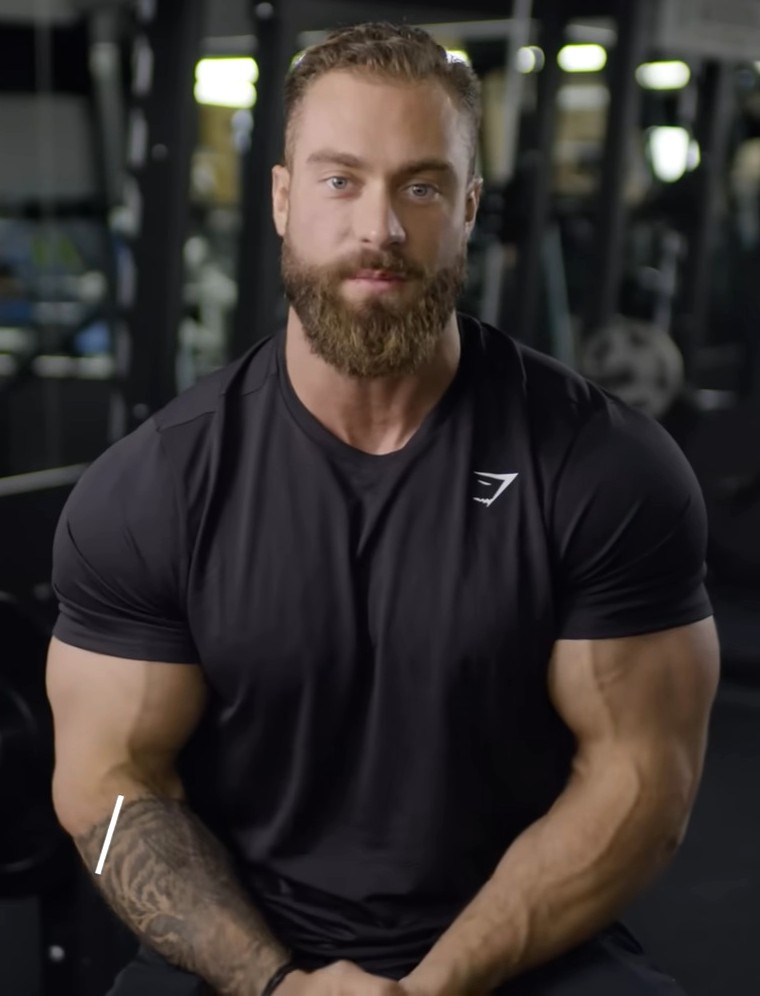
Chris Bumstead 6x Mr. Olympia Classic Physique Champion

The Classic Physique division in Mr. Olympia began in 2016. Danny Hester was the first classic physique Mr. Olympia. As of 2024, Chris Bumstead is the 6x reigning Mr. Olympia.

=== Female bodybuilding ===
The female movement of the 1960s, combined with Title IX and the all around fitness revolution, gave birth to new alternative perspectives of feminine beauty that included an athletic physique of toned muscle. This athletic physique was found in various popular media outlets such as fashion magazines. Female bodybuilders changed the limits of traditional femininity as their bodies showed that muscles are not only just for men.

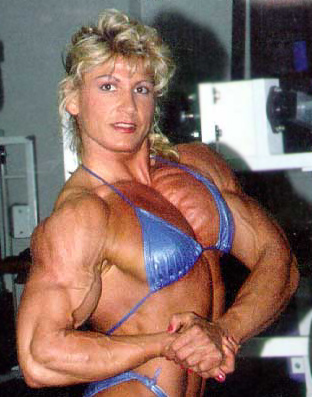
Nikki Fuller posing

The first U.S. Women's National Physique Championship, promoted by Henry McGhee and held in 1978 in Canton, Ohio, is generally regarded as the first true female bodybuilding contest—that is, the first contest where the entrants were judged solely on muscularity. In 1980, the first Ms. Olympia (initially known as the "Miss" Olympia), the most prestigious contest for professionals, was held. The first winner was Rachel McLish, who had also won the NPC's USA Championship earlier in the year. The contest was a major turning point for female bodybuilding.

In 1985, the documentary Pumping Iron II: The Women was released. It documented the preparation of several women for the 1983 Caesars Palace World Cup Championship. Competitors prominently featured in the film were Kris Alexander, Lori Bowen, Lydia Cheng, Carla Dunlap, Bev Francis, and McLish. At the time, Francis was actually a powerlifter, though she soon made a successful transition to bodybuilding, becoming one of the leading competitors of the late 1980s and early 1990s.

The related areas of fitness and figure competition increased in popularity, surpassing that of female bodybuilding, and provided an alternative for women who choose not to develop the level of muscularity necessary for bodybuilding. McLish would closely resemble what is thought of today as a fitness and figure competitor, instead of what is now considered a female bodybuilder.

E. Wilma Conner competed in the 2011 NPC Armbrust Pro Gym Warrior Classic Championships in Loveland, Colorado, at the age of 75 years and 349 days. She later was declared the oldest competitive female bodybuilder by the Guinness Book of World Records in 2012, when she was 77, breaking the record of Ernestine Shepherd.

== Competition ==
In competitive bodybuilding, bodybuilders aspire to present an "aesthetically pleasing" body on stage. In prejudging, competitors do a series of mandatory poses: the front lat spread, rear lat spread, front double biceps, back double biceps, side chest, side triceps, Most Muscular (men only), abdominals and thighs. Each competitor also performs a personal choreographed routine to display their physique. A posedown is usually held at the end of a posing round, while judges are finishing their scoring. Bodybuilders are advised to spend a lot of time practising their posing in front of mirrors or under the guidance of their coach.

In contrast to strongman or powerlifting competitions, where physical strength is paramount, or to Olympic weightlifting, where the main point is equally split between strength and technique, bodybuilding competitions typically emphasize condition, size, and symmetry. Different organizations emphasize particular aspects of competition, and sometimes have different categories in which to compete.

=== Preparations ===
==== Bulking and cutting ====
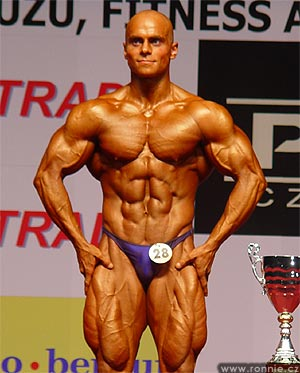
Lukas Osladil posing onstage with a variation of the Most Muscular pose

The general strategy adopted by most present-day competitive bodybuilders is to make muscle gains for most of the year (known as the "off-season") and, approximately 12–14 weeks from competition, lose a maximum of body fat (referred to as "cutting") while preserving as much muscular mass as possible. The bulking phase entails remaining in a net positive energy balance (calorie surplus). The amount of a surplus in which a person remains is based on the person's goals, as a bigger surplus and longer bulking phase will create more fat tissue. The surplus of calories relative to one's energy balance will ensure that muscles remain in a state of anabolism.

The cutting phase entails remaining in a net negative energy balance (calorie deficit). The main goal of cutting is to oxidize fat while preserving as much muscle as possible. The larger the calorie deficit, the faster one will lose weight. However, a large calorie deficit will also create the risk of losing muscle tissue.

The bulking and cutting strategy is considered effective because there is a well-established link between muscle hypertrophy and being in a state of positive energy balance. A sustained period of caloric surplus will allow the athlete to gain more fat-free mass than they could otherwise gain under eucaloric conditions. Some gain in fat mass is expected, which athletes seek to oxidize in a cutting period while maintaining as much lean mass as possible. However, it is unclear whether one can maintain enough fat-free mass during cutting for the overall process to be worth it.

==== Clean bulking ====
The attempt to increase muscle mass in one's body without any gain in fat is called clean bulking. Competitive bodybuilders focus their efforts to achieve a peak appearance during a brief "competition season". Clean bulking takes longer and is a more refined approach to achieving the body fat and muscle mass percentage a person is looking for. A common tactic for keeping fat low and muscle mass high is to have higher calorie and lower calorie days to maintain a balance between gain and loss. Many clean bulk diets start off with a moderate amount of carbs, moderate amount of protein, and a low amount of fats. To maintain a clean bulk, it is important to reach calorie goals every day. Macronutrient goals (carbs, fats, and proteins) will be different for each person, but it is ideal to get as close as possible.

==== Dirty bulking ====
"Dirty bulking" is the process of eating at a massive caloric surplus without trying to figure out the exact amount of ingested macronutrients, often done with junk food such as burgers and fries. Weightlifters who attempt to gain mass quickly with no aesthetic concerns often choose to do this. "Dirty bulking" is often favored by bodybuilders in the off-season who are looking to rapidly increase size and strength without worrying about fat gain. While it can lead to quick weight gain and increased muscle mass due to the abundance of calories, it also typically results in a significant increase in body fat. This means a more aggressive cutting phase is usually required afterward to shed the excess fat, which can be physically and mentally taxing. Additionally, consuming large amounts of processed foods high in sugar and unhealthy fats can negatively impact cardiovascular health and insulin sensitivity over time. Despite these risks, some lifters find dirty bulking psychologically easier, as it removes the pressure of strict meal planning and food tracking.

== Muscle growth ==
Bodybuilders use three main strategies to maximize muscle hypertrophy:

- Strength training through weights or elastic/hydraulic resistance.
- Specialized nutrition, incorporating extra protein and supplements when necessary.
- Adequate rest, including sleep and recuperation between workouts.

=== Weight training ===
Intensive weight training causes micro-tears to the muscles being trained; this is generally known as microtrauma. These micro-tears in the muscle contribute to the soreness felt after exercise, called delayed onset muscle soreness (DOMS). It is the repair of these micro-traumas that results in muscle growth. Normally, this soreness becomes most apparent a day or two after a workout. However, as muscles become adapted to the exercises, soreness tends to decrease.

Weight training aims to build muscle by prompting two different types of hypertrophy: sarcoplasmic and myofibrillar. Sarcoplasmic hypertrophy leads to larger muscles and so is favored by bodybuilders more than myofibrillar hypertrophy, which builds athletic strength. Sarcoplasmic hypertrophy is triggered by increasing repetitions, whereas myofibrillar hypertrophy is triggered by lifting heavier weight. In either case, there is an increase in both size and strength of the muscles (compared to what happens if that same individual does not lift weights at all), although the emphasis is different.

It is important for bodybuilders to train in a manner which keeps their joints strong and reduces the risk of wear and tear injuries from weight training. This means developing muscular strength in a way which does not misalign (decentrate) the joint but causes it to be optimally positioned and aligned (centrated). As considered by physical therapist Chad Waterbury:

An essential aspect of building an impressive upper body physique is maintaining the health and integrity of your shoulder joints [...] Deep within your shoulder are four small muscles that work in concert to stabilize your humerus as you lift weights, throw, or punch. Of the four, two that are on the back of the shoulder- infraspinatus and teres minor- externally rotate the joint and hold the ball (head of humerus) in the center of its socket (glenoid cavity). This joint centration helps prevent wear and tear in your shoulders.

As the joint is centrated it is better positioned and aligned, its overall efficiency and the amount of muscular force that can be applied via it is also increased.

=== Nutrition ===
The high levels of muscle growth and repair achieved by bodybuilders require a specialized diet. Generally speaking, bodybuilders require more calories than the average person of the same weight to provide the protein and energy requirements needed to support their training and increase muscle mass. In preparation of a contest, a sub-maintenance level of food energy is combined with cardiovascular exercise to lose body fat. Proteins, carbohydrates and fats are the three major macronutrients that the human body needs to build muscle. The ratios of calories from carbohydrates, proteins, and fats vary depending on the goals of the bodybuilder.

==== Carbohydrates ====
Carbohydrates play an important role for bodybuilders. They give the body energy to deal with the rigors of training and recovery. Carbohydrates also promote secretion of insulin, a hormone enabling cells to get the glucose they need. Insulin also carries amino acids into cells and promotes protein synthesis. Insulin has steroid-like effects in terms of muscle gains. It is impossible to promote protein synthesis without the existence of insulin, which means that without ingesting carbohydrates or protein—which also induces the release of insulin—it is impossible to add muscle mass. Bodybuilders seek out low-glycemic polysaccharides and other slowly digesting carbohydrates, which release energy in a more stable fashion than high-glycemic sugars and starches. This is important as high-glycemic carbohydrates cause a sharp insulin response, which places the body in a state where it is likely to store additional food energy as fat. However, bodybuilders frequently do ingest some quickly digesting sugars (often in form of pure dextrose or maltodextrin) just before, during, and/or just after a workout. This may help to replenish glycogen stored within the muscle, and to stimulate muscle protein synthesis.

==== Protein ====
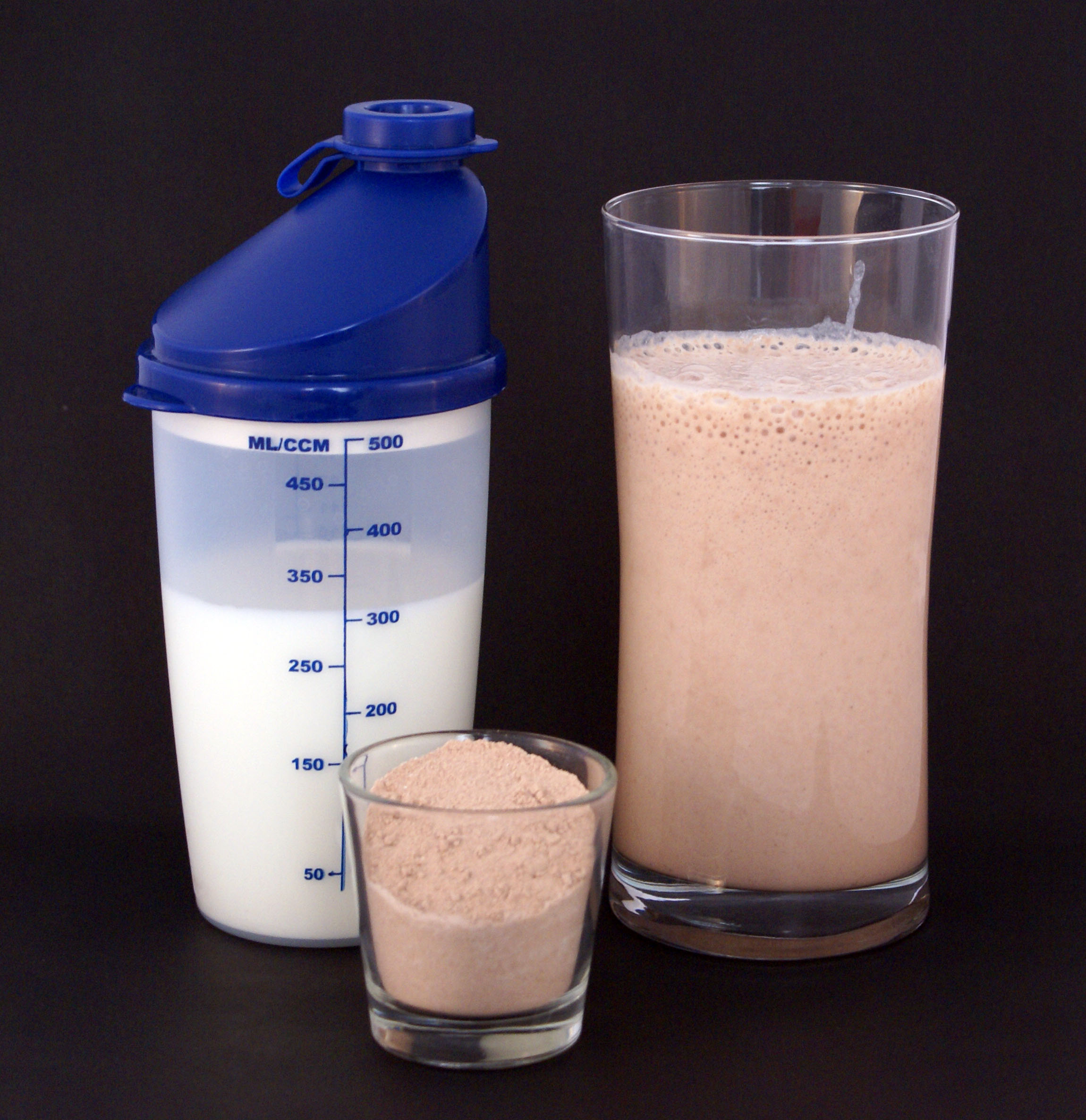
Protein milkshakes, made from protein powder (center) and milk (left), are a common supplement.

The motor proteins actin and myosin generate the forces exerted by contracting muscles. Cortisol decreases amino acid uptake by muscle and inhibits protein synthesis. Current recommendations suggest that bodybuilders should consume 25–30% of protein per total calorie intake to further their goal of maintaining and improving their body composition. This is a widely debated topic, with many arguing that 1 gram of protein per pound of body weight per day is ideal, some suggesting that less is sufficient, while others recommending 1.5, 2, or more. It is believed that protein needs to be consumed frequently throughout the day, especially during/after a workout, and before sleep. There is also some debate concerning the best type of protein to take. Chicken, turkey, beef, pork, fish, eggs and dairy foods are high in protein, as are some nuts, seeds, beans, and lentils. Casein or whey are often used to supplement the diet with additional protein. Whey is the type of protein contained in many popular brands of protein supplements and is preferred by many bodybuilders because of its high biological value (BV) and quick absorption rates. Whey protein also has a bigger effect than casein on insulin levels, triggering about double the amount of insulin release. That effect is somewhat overcome by combining casein and whey.

Bodybuilders were previously thought to require protein with a higher BV than that of soy, which was additionally avoided due to its alleged estrogenic (female hormone) properties, though more recent studies have shown that soy actually contains phytoestrogens which compete with estrogens in the male body and can block estrogenic actions. Soy, flax, and other plant-based foods that contain phytoestrogens are also beneficial because they can inhibit some pituitary functions while stimulating the liver's P450 system (which eliminates hormones, drugs, and waste from the body) to more actively process and excrete excess estrogen.

==== Meals ====
Some bodybuilders often split their food intake into 5 to 7 meals of equal nutritional content and eat at regular intervals (e.g., every 2 to 3 hours). This approach serves two purposes: to limit overindulging in the cutting phase, and to allow for the consumption of large volumes of food during the bulking phase. Eating more frequently does not increase basal metabolic rate when compared to 3 meals a day. While food does have a metabolic cost to digest, absorb, and store, called the thermic effect of food, it depends on the quantity and type of food, not how the food is spread across the meals of the day. Well-controlled studies using whole-body calorimetry and doubly labeled water have demonstrated that there is no metabolic advantage to eating more frequently.

==== Creatine ====
One of the most popular supplements is creatine. Although the body naturally produces creatine, it typically only produces enough to maintain around 60–80% of its full capacity. Creatine is most often found in red meats and seafood; however, a pound of uncooked beef and salmon only contains 1–2 grams of creatine. About 95% of creatine is stored in the skeletal muscle, while the remaining percentage is found in the brain and testes. Typical supplemental creatine doses are 3–5 grams per day.

While taking creatine as a dietary supplement doesn't directly build muscle, it can lead to rapid energy production, increase improvement, enhance muscle recovery, prevent injuries, and provide neuroprotection. This is due to the fact that when creatine is paired with increased glycogen storage in the muscle, glycogen can quickly release glucose, providing an immense burst of energy. This burst of energy is helpful for professional bodybuilders, as anabolic steroids often cause fatigue and other health issues over time.

==== Pre-workout ====
Another common supplement for bodybuilders is pre-workout. Pre-workout includes a mix of specific supplements aiming to boost energy and performance for a short period of time, often taken 30–60 minutes before a workout. Some of the most common supplements found in pre-workouts include L-arginine, L-citrulline, beetroot juice, caffeine, creatine, beta-alanine, and branched-chain amino acids (BCAAs). Pre-workout typically comes in the form of a powder, in a big container with a serving-sized scoop. Though it can be mixed it with any liquid, water is usually recommended for the best benefits. A common negative side effect associated with pre-workouts is impaired sleep. This is because the energy boost it provides can often last for hours on end, overall impairing sleep.

=== Performance-enhancing substances ===
Some bodybuilders use drugs such as anabolic steroids and precursor substances such as prohormones to increase muscle hypertrophy. Anabolic steroids cause hypertrophy of both types (I and II) of muscle fibers, likely caused by an increased synthesis of muscle proteins. They also provoke undesired side effects including hepatotoxicity, gynecomastia, acne, the early onset of male pattern baldness and a decline in the body's own testosterone production, which can cause testicular atrophy. Other performance-enhancing substances used by competitive bodybuilders include human growth hormone (HGH). HGH is also used by female bodybuilders to obtain bigger muscles "while maintaining a 'female appearance'".

Muscle growth is more difficult to achieve in older adults than younger adults because of biological aging, which leads to many metabolic changes detrimental to muscle growth; for instance, by diminishing growth hormone and testosterone levels. Some recent clinical studies have shown that low-dose HGH treatment for adults with HGH deficiency changes the body composition by increasing muscle mass, decreasing fat mass, increasing bone density and muscle strength, improves cardiovascular parameters, and affects the quality of life without significant side effects.

In rodents, knockdown of metallothionein gene expression results in activation of the Akt pathway and increases in myotube size, in type IIb fiber hypertrophy, and ultimately in muscle strength. This has not been studied well in humans.

==== Injecting oil into muscles ====
Some bodybuilders inject oils or other compounds into their muscles (sometimes known as "synthol") to enhance their size or appearance. This practice can have serious health consequences and risks for humans.

=== Rest ===
Although muscle stimulation occurs when lifting weights, muscle growth occurs during rest periods for up to 48 hours after the workout. Some bodybuilders add a massage at the end of each workout to their routine as a method of recovering.

=== Overtraining ===
Overtraining occurs when a bodybuilder has trained to the point where their workload exceeds their recovery capacity. There are many reasons why overtraining occurs, including lack of adequate nutrition, lack of recovery time between workouts, insufficient sleep, and training at a high intensity for too long (a lack of splitting apart workouts). Training at a high intensity too frequently also stimulates the central nervous system (CNS) and can result in a hyperadrenergic state that interferes with sleep patterns. To avoid overtraining, intense frequent training must be met with at least an equal amount of purposeful recovery. Timely provision of carbohydrates, proteins, and various micronutrients such as vitamins, minerals, phytochemicals, even nutritional supplements are critical. A mental disorder, informally called bigorexia (by analogy with anorexia), may account for overtraining in some individuals. Sufferers feel as if they are never big enough or muscular enough, which forces them to overtrain to try to reach their goal physique.

An article by Muscle & Fitness magazine, "Overtrain for Big Gains", claimed that overtraining for a brief period can be beneficial. Overtraining can be used advantageously, as when a bodybuilder is purposely overtrained for a brief period of time to super compensate during a regeneration phase. These are known as "shock micro-cycles" and were a key training technique used by Soviet athletes.

== Increased mortality rate ==
Beginning in the 2010s, studies on bodybuilding athletes found higher mortality rates, particularly when compared with other sport specific mortality rates. Risks cited were sudden cardiac death, as well as use of performance enhancing drugs and unique competitive training, such as extreme weight changes and intentional dehydration. Unlike other professional sports, the IFBB Pro League, the largest professional bodybuilding federation in the US, does not routinely test athletes for steroids or other performance-enhancing drugs and there is no athletes' union. Bodybuilders say steroids are easily obtained and widely used by competitors.

== See also ==
- Athletic training
- Beefcake
- Himbo
- Body image
- Exercise physiology
- Health club
- Lean body mass
- Muscle dysmorphia
- Physical exercise
- Physical fitness
- Power training
- Sports medicine
- Sports nutrition
