= Two Hands Anyhow =

Weightlifting exercise

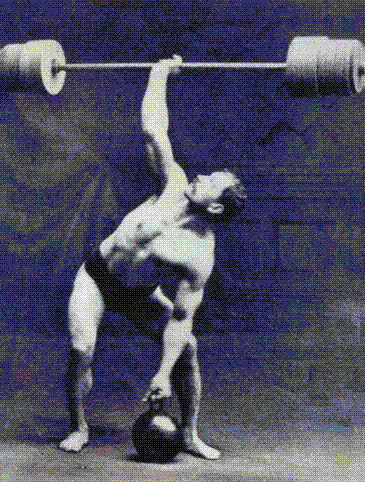
Arthur Saxon performing a Two Hands Anyhow.

The Two Hands Anyhow is a traditional strongman weightlifting exercise. The goal was to lift as much weight overhead with two hands (two separate weights) in any method.

The exercise was popular with lifters such as Arthur Saxon and Thomas Inch. The most common version of the Two Hands Anyhow had lifters bent press a barbell with the strong arm and then lift a smaller weight with the other arm, usually a kettlebell. The world record for the two hands anyhow in this style is 448 lb (203 kg) by Arthur Saxon who used a 336 lb (152 kg) barbell and a 112 lb (51 kg) kettlebell.

In Great Britain the lift was called the Two Hands Anyhow with Barbell and Ring-Weight, and a ring-weight or dumb-bell would be used rather than a kettlebell. Under the strict British Amateur Weight Lifters' Association rules, Ron Walker set the British Heavyweight Record in 1937 with 310.5 lb (140.8 kg). For a long time, this lift was the one where the record for most weight lifted overhead was achieved until Olympic Weightlifting improved its techniques enough to allow for clean and jerk lifts of over 500 pounds (230 kg), eclipsing the Two Hands Anyhow record.
