= Most muscular =

Bodybuilding pose

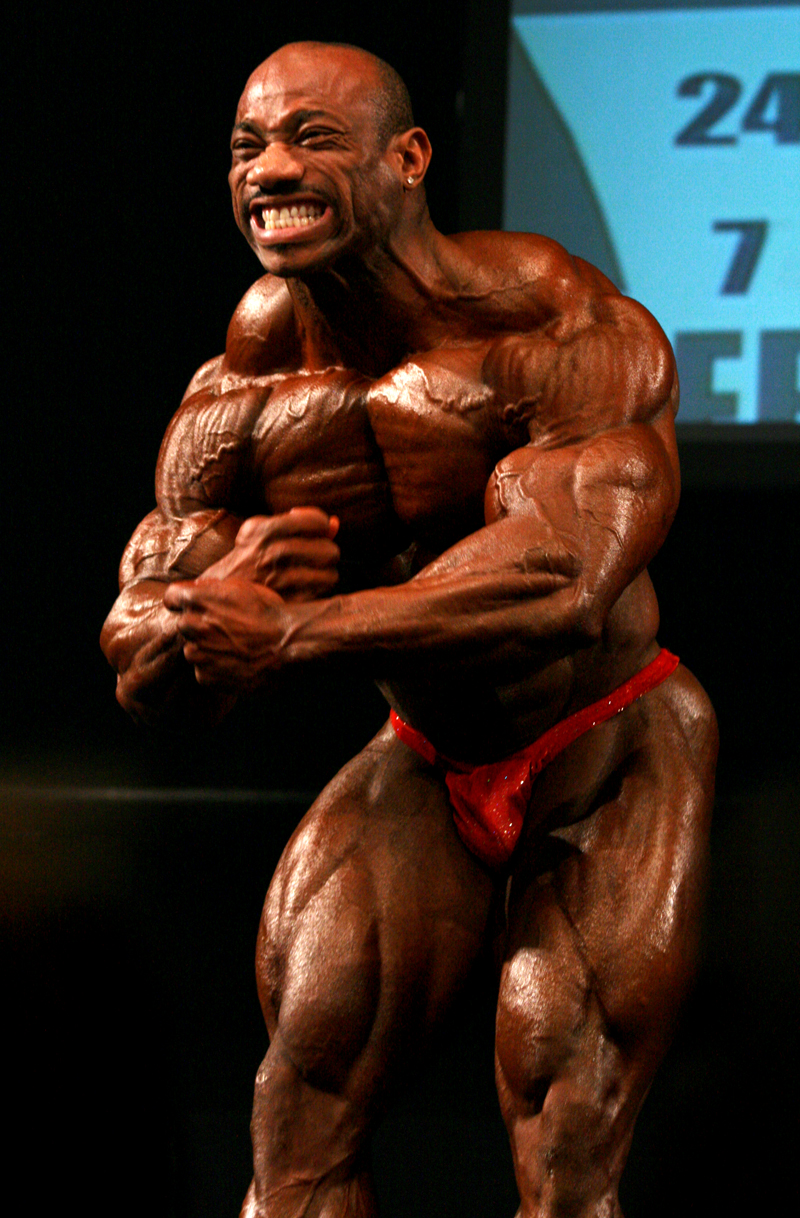
A most muscular pose by Dexter Jackson

The most muscular is a common bodybuilding pose, often used to highlight as much of a contestant's muscle repertoire as possible by demonstrating the maximum mass of muscle to the judging panel. It was first popularized by bodybuilder Harold Poole. There are several variants. The crab, hands-on-hips, and hands-in-front are the most popular.

All front-facing muscles should be showcased since the contestant forces their hands together at the same time as contracting the pectorals, obliques, anterior deltoids, biceps, forearms and abdominals. The quadriceps and calves should also be flexed.
