= Suzuki LT500R =

- Manufacturer: Suzuki
- Production: 1987–1990
- Class: 500cc ATV/quad bike
- Engine: 500 cc (31 cu in), single-cylinder, 2-stroke, liquid-cooled
- Bore / stroke: 86 mm × 86 mm (3.4 in × 3.4 in)
- Power: 50–70 bhp (37–52 kW)
- Torque: 46 lb⋅ft (62 N⋅m)
- Transmission: 5-speed, constant-mesh sequential manual, chain final drive
- Suspension: Double A-arm with adjustable preload (front); Full Floater linkage, adjustable preload (rear)
- Brakes: Triple-hydraulic disc, single-piston caliper
- Wheelbase: 53 in (1,300 mm)
- Dimensions: L: 75.6 in (1,920 mm); W: 47.4 in (1,200 mm); H: 43.7 in (1,110 mm)
- Weight: 392 lb (178 kg) (dry); 686 lb (311 kg) (GVWR) (wet)
- Fuel capacity: 3.4 US gal (13 L)

The Suzuki LT500R, also known as the QuadRacer 500, and nicknamed Quadzilla, is a two-stroke 499 cc (30.5 cu in) ATV, designed, developed and built by Suzuki, and produced between 1987 and 1990.
