= Bent press =

Type of weight training exercise

A bent press is a type of weight training exercise, wherein a weight is brought from shoulder-level to overhead one-handed using the muscles of the back, legs, and arm. A very large amount of weight can be lifted this way, compared to other types of one-hand press. It has been said that more weight can be lifted with one hand in this manner than in the typical two-handed overhead barbell press. It was a staple of the old-time strongmen and strongwomen such as Eugen Sandow, Arthur Saxon, and Louis Cyr, but is no longer popular. Like any exercise that is attempted without proper progression and full understanding, it poses safety concerns due to the thoracic rotation, and core strength required. However, proponents of the exercise argue that, since it uses the leverage of the body in order to lift the weight, if progressed to and performed correctly, it is a safe exercise. Despite its name, the arm does not press the weight aloft.

== Method ==
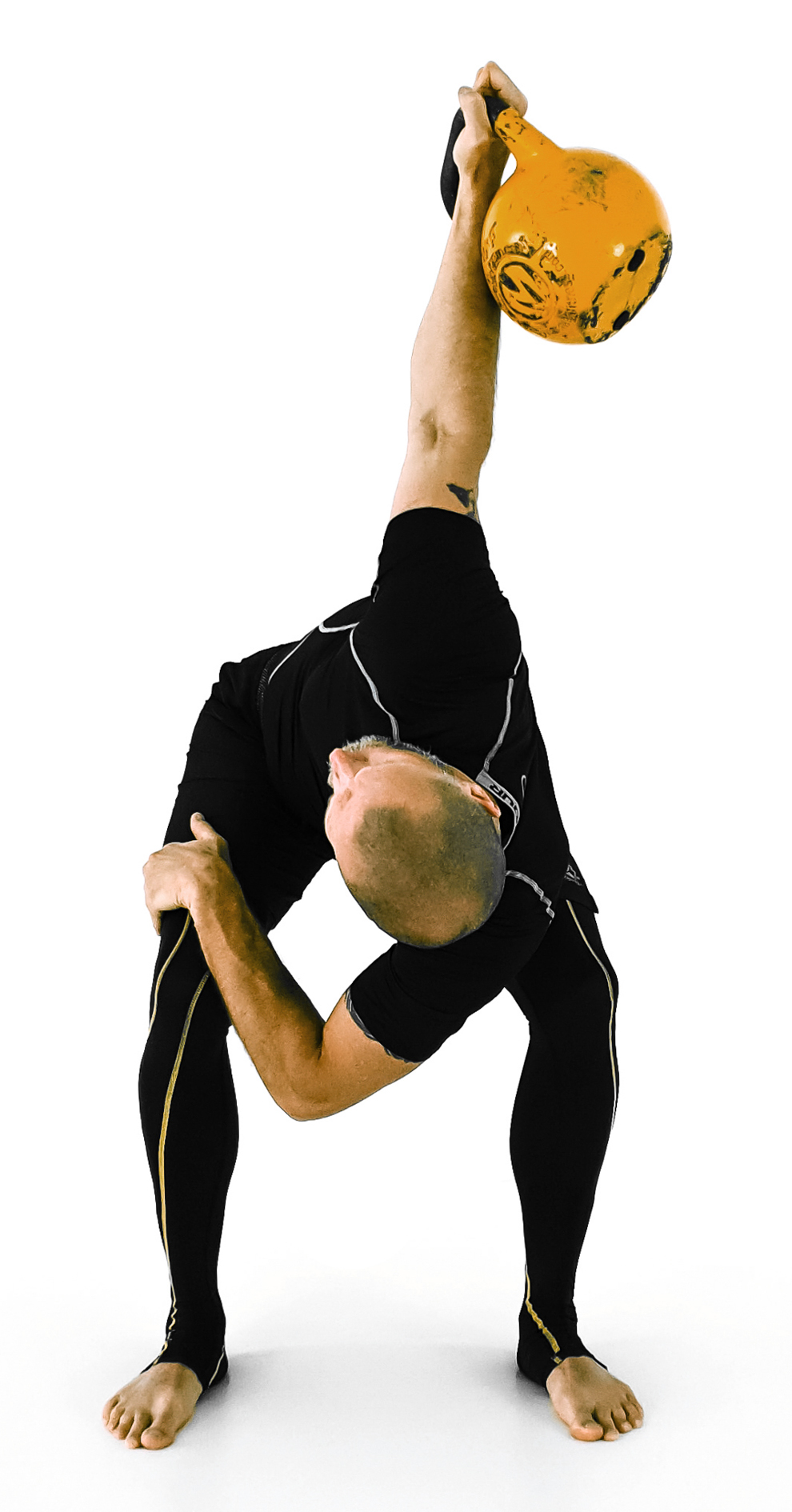
Bottom position where the athlete has come fully under the weight.

To do the bent press, one would begin by lifting the weight to the shoulder (usually a barbell, but it could be done with a kettlebell or dumbbell), either by a one or two-handed clean, or by lifting one end and "rocking" it onto the shoulder. If done with the right hand (the reverse is done for the left hand), the right leg would be straight and directly underneath the weight, with the left leg bent at a slight angle. The lifter would then bend to the left, holding the weight in the same position. The bent position, the origin of the name "bent press", allows the arm to hold the weight in position without dropping, because of the body's leverage, creating an imaginary line between the bell and the floor that travels through the right arm and right leg. The lifter continues to bend to the left until the arm is fully extended. The weight is not pressed, but held aloft while bending "underneath it". To complete the lift, after the arm is fully extended, the lifter does a slight corkscrew to get "underneath the weight" in a half or full squat position, again without pressing the weight, and then once underneath the weight with the arm locked out overhead holding the weight, the lifter stands erect, still holding the weight overhead. The weight can either be dropped or lowered in military press fashion after the lift is complete.

A key element of this lift is balance. The lifter should stare at the weight once shouldered and while the arm moves to a locked position overhead. In reality, the lifter bends his body and shoulder away from the weight, bending the opposite leg to help lower the shoulder away from the weight. The whole arm that holds the weight sort of rests on the lifter's back on that side. The opposite arm is held straight out for balance as well. Although most of the lockout is achieved by bending away from the weight, some pressing of the arm is also employed. The only real danger I ever found in this lift was dropping it on things if balance was lost (once on my mother's suitcase). A lifter can easily move away from the weight if it falls. In the 1963, as a 16-year-old, I could do 165 weighing 160 and in 1972, I did 200 weighing 198. When I was in my 50's, upon doing this lift again, I discovered extreme shoulder flexibility is required and could only do 100lbs. x 10 reps. Without good shoulder flexibility, a tear could occur. Dumbbells are harder to control than a long bar of the same weight as the longer bar will turn or rotate much more slowly while being moved. - Dale Rhoades, owner of the Des Moines Strength Institute

== Records ==
The world record in the bent press is 371 pounds (168 kg) by Arthur Saxon, but there were unofficial reports of him bent pressing 409.5 pounds (185.7 kg).

== See also ==
- Two Hands Anyhow
- Powerlifting
