= Joey Swoll =

American fitness influencer

Joey Sergo (mainly known as Joey Swoll) is an American fitness influencer. A self-described "CEO of gym positivity", he became a prominent account on TikTok in 2022 due to his videos calling out undesirable behaviors in gyms. He has often called out female influencers for falsely accusing men of inappropriate behaviors. His videos have been described by some people as facilitating harassment against their targets.

== History ==
Sergo started exercising in his adolescence and cites his gym activity as a factor in overcoming mental health problems. He began making videos on TikTok in 2020, and subsequently gained a larger following in 2022 due to viral videos criticizing other content creators for how they behave while using gym spaces.

Sergo's videos calling out other content creators have been described by some as facilitating the hounding of the videos' targets. In 2023, a woman who was called out by him said that she had received death threats and malicious phone calls from his followers. She also said that a stranger had visited a studio she was working at. She ultimately deleted her accounts on Instagram, TikTok, LinkedIn and Facebook.

Some scholars have described Sergo and other Tiktok influencers, such as Drew Afualo and Bryce Hall, as being engaged in a cycle of "reciprocal trolling", which is a phenomenon where influencers intentionally stir up debate and controversy in a manner which energizes their followers against other Tiktok users and thus mutually increases viewer engagement. Another case study on the effect of social media influencers on young men found that many teenage boys who use TikTok attribute their perception that they are at risk of false allegations of sexual assault to videos created by Sergo.

In June 2025, Sergo visited a young fan who had been involved in a car accident in California. He was the target of criticism later that year in July after he published a tribute to deceased wrestling celebrity Hulk Hogan.
