= Paul Demayo =

American bodybuilder (1967–2005)

- Professional bodybuilder

Personal info
- Nickname: Quadzilla
- Born: September 12, 1967; Malden, Massachusetts, U.S.
- Died: June 2, 2005 (aged 37); Medford, Massachusetts, U.S.

Best statistics
- Height: 5 ft 10 in (1.78 m)
- Weight: 252.5 lb (114.5 kg) (contest); 285 lb (129 kg) (off-season)

Paul DeMayo (September 12, 1967 – June 2, 2005) was an American IFBB professional bodybuilder.

== Biography ==
Paul DeMayo was nicknamed "Quadzilla" for the size of his massive quadriceps. He had what many would call a "god-like" physique. Born and raised in Edgeworth Malden, Massachusetts, United States, DeMayo first competed in bodybuilding when he placed 1st in the Teenage Massachusetts State championships. His first National Physique Committee (NPC) event was in 1988, where he took 7th place in the NPC Junior USA heavyweight class. He took 1st place in the NPC Nationals Championship event in 1994. His only Mr. Olympia was in 1995, when he placed 12th. DeMayo appeared in many fitness and magazine articles, including being featured on the cover of Iron Man.

== Death ==
DeMayo died on June 2, 2005. in Boston from a heroin overdose. According to people close to him, DeMayo's problems started when his wife left him and he returned to Boston after he moved to California with her to train in Gold's Gym. He then was signed to an endorsement contract by sports nutritional supplement company Met-Rx and forced to compete in the 1995 Mr. Olympia against his wishes. He placed 12th and retired shortly afterwards.

DeMayo spent two years in the Billerica House of Correction (Middlesex County Jail) for shooting his gun in the air after an argument with his girlfriend and possession of percodan. Some months before his death he told friends he was working at Gold's Gym on Lansdowne Street in Boston, but it was revealed later that he had been fired several months earlier due to a substance abuse problem.

== Contest history ==
- 1988 NPC Junior USA HeavyWeight - 7th
- 1989 NPC Junior Nationals HeavyWeight - 4th
- 1990 NPC Junior Nationals HeavyWeight - 3rd
- 1991 NPC Junior Nationals Heavyweight - 1st & Overall Winner
- 1991 NPC HeavyWeight - 3rd
- 1992 NPC Nationals HeavyWeight - 4th
- 1993 NPC USA Championships HeavyWeight - 3rd
- 1994 NPC Nationals Heavyweight - 1st & Overall Winner
- 1995 Mr. Olympia - 12th
- 1995 IFBB Grand Prix England - 10th
- 1995 IFBB Grand Prix Germany - 9th
- 1995 IFBB Grand Prix Spain - 9th
