= Arthur Saxon =

German strongman

- Born: Arthur Hennig; April 28, 1878; Leipzig, Kingdom of Saxony, German Empire
- Died: August 6, 1921 (aged 43); Duisburg, Weimar Germany
- Occupations: Strongman, circus performer

Arthur Saxon (April 28, 1878 – August 6, 1921), born Arthur Hennig and nicknamed "The Iron-Master", was a German strongman and circus performer from the late 19th century into the early 20th century.

Saxon is best known for the bent press, a lift in which he was far superior to any other strongman, setting a world record of 168 kg (370 lb) which remains unbroken to this day. He also lifted 175 kg (386 lb) informally in a gym, as well as making a two hands anyhow lift of 203 kg (448 lb).

== Career ==
Arno Patschke, known as Arno Saxon on stage, a performer and former Greco-Roman wrestler from Germany was eager to make money performing strongman acts. He traveled to Leipzig, where he convinced Oscard Hilgenfeldt and Arthur Hennig (Saxon) to join him in creating the "Greatest Strong Show" in the country.

Eventually Saxon's two brothers, Kurt and Hermann joined the group as well, forming the "Saxon Trio," and in 1897, they began performing for a circus in Europe. In one act, Saxon lifted his seated brothers on a barbell with one arm. Another popular portion of their performances included opening the stage to anyone who challenged the validity of a lift, to try for themselves.

At one point during a bent press performance Saxon claimed the act could not be repeated by the famous Eugen Sandow. Unbeknownst to Saxon, on February 26, 1898, Sandow, in the audience at the time, accepted the challenge. Sandow was unable to replicate the lift and, in retaliation, took the Saxon Trio to court. In the case, Sandow won with a ruling that he had "handled the bell in exactly the same bodily attitude as Arthur," the judge not fully understanding the lift.

=== Personal records ===
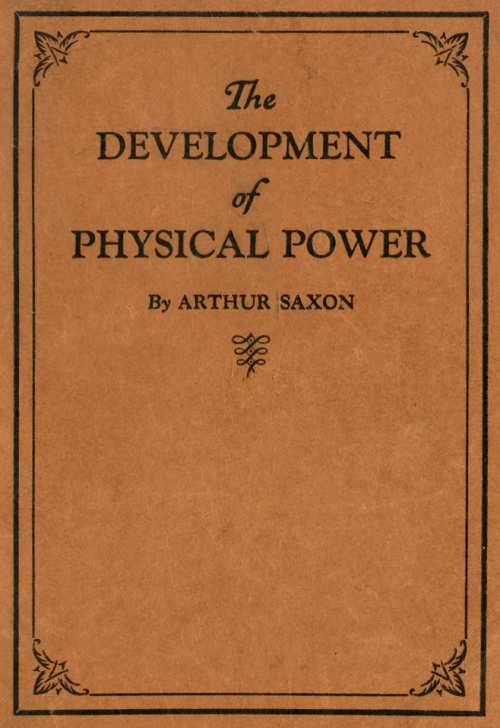
Cover of The Development of Physical Power (1905).

Saxon recorded several of his personal records in his books The Development of Physical Power (1905) and The Text Book of Weightlifting (1910).

- Bent Press – 168 kg (370 lb) (official world record), and 175 kg (386 lb) (unofficial world record)
- Two Hands Anyhow – 203 kg (448 lb) (unofficial world record)
- Pullover and Push Lift – 175 kg (386 lb)
- One-Hand Snatch – 90.5 kg (200 lb)
- One-Hand Military Press – 57 kg (126 lb)
- Two-Hands Military Press – 114.5 kg (252 lb)
- Behind-The-Neck Jerk – 141 kg (311 lb)
- Clean and jerk – 155 kg (342 lb)
- One-Hand Clean and Jerk – 112.5 kg (248 lb)

== Publications ==
Cover of The Text Book of Weightlifting (1910).

In 1905 Saxon published The Development of Physical Power, which explains his methods for performing lifts including the usage of barbells, dumbbells, and kettlebells, as well as Ring, Ball and Square lifting. This book also depicts Saxon displaying the lifts in 45 pages of photographs.

Saxon's The Text Book of Weight-Lifting, published in 1910, includes some psychological explanation of lifting, rather than strict routine. He explains several lifts, such as the famous bent press and continental lifts.

== Death ==
While Saxon was exempt for service in World War I, he nonetheless suffered from malnutrition due to food shortages in Germany, even as he continued his strongman act in Scandinavia. After the war he tried to continue his strongman act, which conflicted with his unhealthy condition. He grew weaker and developed tuberculosis. Saxon eventually developed pneumonia, causing his death on August 6, 1921, at age 43. His occupation at the time, as recorded on his death certificate, was stonemasonry.
