= List of national deadlift record holders =

Listed below are the athletes who hold their national deadlift records irrespective of the sport (strongman or powerlifting), performed using only the conventional stance.

The all-time world record stands at 511 kg (1,126.56 lb), achieved by Mexico's Raul Flores.

== Men's national deadlift record holders ==
49 nations have their national record at or above 400 kg (881.8 lb).

Country	Athlete	Weight	Competition	Ref.
Mexico	Raul Flores	511 kg (1,127 lb)	2026 World Deadlift Championships	
Iceland	Hafþór Júlíus Björnsson	510 kg (1,124 lb)	2025 World Deadlift Championships	
England	Eddie Hall	500 kg (1,102 lb)	2016 World Deadlift Championships	
Iran	Peiman Maheripour	485 kg (1,069 lb)	2024 Iran's Strongest Men & Women	
Russia	Ivan Makarov	483 kg (1,065 lb)	2022 Eisenhart Deadlift Championships	
Estonia	Rauno Heinla	476 kg (1,049 lb)	2022 World Deadlift Championships	
Ukraine	Ivan Makarov	475 kg (1,047 lb)	2021 World Deadlift Championships	
Australia	Mitchell Hooper	475 kg (1,047 lb)	2021 Excalibur Max Deadlift	
United States	Trey Mitchell	470 kg (1,036 lb)	2024 World Deadlift Championships	
(Georgia (country)) Georgia	Ivan Makarov	470 kg (1,036 lb)	2024 World Deadlift Championships	
Canada	Mitchell Hooper	470 kg (1,036 lb)	2024 World Deadlift Championships	
New Zealand	Mathew Ragg	460 kg (1,014 lb)	2024 Trans Tasman at Meatstock	
South Africa	Rayno Nel	460 kg (1,014 lb)	2026 SCL World Finals	
(Republic of Ireland) Ireland	Sean Gillen	455 kg (1,003 lb)	2025 Raising the Dead 5	
(Bosnia and Herzegovina) Bosnia & Herzegovina	Nedžmin Ambešković	453.5 kg (1,000 lb)	2021 World Deadlift Championships	
Ghana	Evans Nana Aryee	453.5 kg (1,000 lb)	2026 World Deadlift Championships	
Israel	Vladislav Alhazov	442.5 kg (976 lb)	2017 Eisenhart Deadlift Championships	
Lithuania	Žydrūnas Savickas	440 kg (970 lb)	2011 World's Strongest Man	
Wales	Gavin Bilton	440 kg (970 lb)	2025 World Deadlift Championships	
Austria	Martin Wildauer	435 kg (959 lb)	2014 World Deadlift Championships	
Czech Republic	Jan "Honza" Jiruše	435 kg (959 lb)	2026 EVLS Push & Pull Cup	
Scotland	Andy Black	432.5 kg (953 lb)	2025 PL Series Log & Deadlift Champs	
Latvia	Konstantīns Konstantinovs	430 kg (948 lb)	2006 LPF Latvian Powerlifting Champs	
Latvia	Didzis Zariņš	430 kg (948 lb)	2023 Baltic Deadlift Championships	
Turkey	Cenk Koçak	430 kg (948 lb)	2023 Izmir Expo Powerlifting Champs	
Bahrain	Hussain Ali Juma	430 kg (948 lb)	2024 GCC Strongest Man	
France	Jean-Stephen Coraboeuf	430 kg (948 lb)	2024 Log.Deadlift.Stone	
Germany	Patrick Eibel	430 kg (948 lb)	2026 SCL Czech Republic	
Greenland	Kim Ujarak Lorentzen	425 kg (937 lb)	2022 GI Fitness sports meet	
Burkina Faso	Cheick "Iron Biby" Sanou	425 kg (937 lb)	2024 World Deadlift Championships	
Sweden	Fredrik Svensson	423.5 kg (934 lb)	2024 Raw Powerlift Elit	
Bulgaria	Dimitar Savatinov	422.5 kg (931 lb)	2018 Arnold Strongman Classic	
Poland	Krzysztof Wierzbicki	422.5 kg (931 lb)	2026 PLTRAW Central European Champs	
Poland	Adam Roszkowski	422.5 kg (931 lb)	2026 SCL World Finals	
Netherlands	Kevin Hazeleger	421 kg (928 lb)	2026 SCL World Finals	
Hungary	Tibor Mészáros	420.5 kg (927 lb)	2004 GPC World Cup	
Belgium	Evans Nana Aryee	420 kg (926 lb)	2023 Deadlift Domination	
Qatar	Christopher Oketch	420 kg (926 lb)	2024 GCC Strongest Man	
Serbia	Albin Hasanović	420 kg (926 lb)	2025 Eisenhart Deadlift Championships	
Brazil	Lucas Veronezi	420 kg (926 lb)	2026 Arnold South America	
Brazil	Willian Brito Piovezan	420 kg (926 lb)	2026 Iceland's Strongest Man	
Slovakia	Róbert Valach	415 kg (915 lb)	2025 Strongman Eagles Slovakia	
Slovenia	Matjaž Belšak	410 kg (904 lb)	2019 Arnold Africa	
Finland	Ano Turtiainen	405.5 kg (894 lb)	2002 WPC WPO Finals	
Denmark	Frederik Nordberg	405 kg (893 lb)	2025 Max Power November	
China	Zheng Mincong	405 kg (893 lb)	2026 IPL Beijing 1st Powerlifting Challenge	
Azerbaijan	Vüqar Namazov	402.5 kg (887 lb)	2011 WPF Powerlifting Worlds	
Lebanon	Etienne El Chaer	402.5 kg (887 lb)	2026 Silent Worker Meet	
Norway	Jonas Bathen	402 kg (886 lb)	2026 National Championship 1 RM Deadlift	
Italy	Andrea Invernizzi	401 kg (884 lb)	2022 Maxima Press and Deadlift	
Northern Ireland	Glenn Ross	400 kg (882 lb)	2002 Ulster's Strongest Man	
Thailand	Nugongid Buranasate	400 kg (882 lb)	2022 Ultimate Strongman U105 Champs	

- As of 14 November 2026

== Women's national deadlift record holders ==
24 nations have their women's national record at or above 250 kg (551.2 lb). England's Lucy Underdown holds the world record at 325 kg (716.50 lb).

Country	Athlete	Weight	Competition	Ref.
England	Lucy Underdown	325 kg (717 lb)	2024 World Deadlift Championships	
United States	Becca Swanson	315 kg (694 lb)	2005 WPC WPO European Semifinals	
Wales	Claire Myler	300 kg (661 lb)	2024 Official Strongman Record Breakers	
Australia	Lydia Hantke	292.5 kg (645 lb)	2025 Raising the Dead V	
Australia	Natalie Laalaai	292.5 kg (645 lb)	2025 Mandurah's Biggest Deadlift	
Germany	Denise Herber	291.5 kg (643 lb)	2024 The Ghost Clash 3	
Zambia	Cherry Muchindu	290 kg (639 lb)	2026 Africa Record Breakers	
Canada	Brittany Schlater	289 kg (637 lb)	2026 IPF World Classic Powerlifting Championships	
Ukraine	Olga Liashchuk	288.5 kg (636 lb)	2023 Arnold Strongwoman Classic	
Scotland	Izzy Tait	285 kg (628 lb)	2025 Scotland's Strongest Man Record Breakers	
Puerto Rico	Inez Carrasquillo	277 kg (611 lb)	2025 Arnold Strongwoman Classic	
Belgium	Sonita Muluh	275 kg (606 lb)	2026 Sheffield Powerlifting Championships	
Argentina	Mariela Ortellado	270 kg (595 lb)	2019 IPL World Powerlifting Championships	
New Zealand	Dina Hakeai	270 kg (595 lb)	2020 New Zealand Strongman Record Breakers	
Italy	Elena Di Bisceglie	270 kg (595 lb)	2024 Maxima Apollon Axle Lift e Barbell Deadlift	
Netherlands	Patricia Smit	270 kg (595 lb)	2025 Strongman Battles Spring Edition	
(Republic of Ireland) Ireland	Gemma Moore	265 kg (584 lb)	2020 Shankill Barbell Deadlift Championships	
South Africa	Rowan Zunckel	260 kg (573 lb)	2024 WPC and AWPC Nationals	
Belarus	Ekaterina Efremova	260 kg (573 lb)	2025 WRPF Nikolai Kagansky Memorial Cup	
Brazil	Samara França	260 kg (573 lb)	2026 Arnold South America Powerlifting	
Bulgaria	Viktoriya Ilieva	260 kg (573 lb)	2026 ABS Series 29 - Pro	
Finland	Petra Blomvall	255 kg (562 lb)	2022 Tatu Avola Memorial	
Sweden	Emelie Leach	254 kg (560 lb)	2022 European Classic Powerlifting Championships	
Slovakia	Jána Vašková	251 kg (553 lb)	2022 GPC World Championships	
France	Angéline Berva	250 kg (551 lb)	2025 Barbarian Games	

- As of 3 August 2026

== See also ==
- Deadlift
- Progression of the deadlift world record
- The World Deadlift Championships
- The Eisenhart Black Deadlift Championships
- List of people who have broken the 1000lb barrier in the deadlift
- Elephant bar
