= List of people who have broken the 1000lb barrier in the deadlift =

Listed below are the athletes who have achieved a 1,000 pounds (453.6 kilograms) or more deadlift, a feat which has been accomplished by only 40 men in history. It includes both strongman and powerlifting deadlifts performed using only the conventional stance. Sanctioned lifts during competitions and exhibitions, as well as unsanctioned lifts during training (with video proof) are included.

== Athletes who have deadlifted 1000 pounds or more ==
The following table lists the athletes who have achieved the feat. Although only the heaviest lift is mentioned for each athlete, the year they achieved the 1000 pound mark for the first time is also indicated. The list consists of both competition and training lifts. The all-time world record stands at 511 kg (1,126.56 lb), achieved by Mexico's Raul Flores.

Athlete	Heaviest deadlift	Context	First achieved in	Ref.
(Mexico) Raul Flores	511 kg (1,127 lb)	2026 World Deadlift Championships	2025	
(Iceland) Hafþór Júlíus Björnsson	510 kg (1,124 lb)	2025 World Deadlift Championships	2017	
(England) Eddie Hall	500 kg (1,102 lb)	2016 World Deadlift Championships	2015	
(Iran) Peiman Maheripour	492 kg (1,085 lb)	2021 during training	2020	
(Russia) Ivan Makarov	490 kg (1,080 lb)	2020 during training	2019	
(Estonia) Asko Karu	482 kg (1,063 lb)	2021 during training	2021	
(Estonia) Rauno Heinla	476 kg (1,049 lb)	2022 World Deadlift Championships	2019	
(Ukraine) Pavlo Nakonechnyy	475 kg (1,047 lb)	2021 during training	2021	
(Australia) Mitchell Hooper	475 kg (1,047 lb)	2021 Excalibur Max Deadlift	2021	
(England) Graham Hicks	470 kg (1,036 lb)	2022 World Deadlift Championships	2022	
(United States) Trey Mitchell	470 kg (1,036 lb)	2024 World Deadlift Championships	2024	
(England) Adam Bishop	470 kg (1,036 lb)	2025 World Deadlift Championships	2021	
(United States) Austin Andrade	470 kg (1,036 lb)	2025 World Deadlift Championships	2024	
(United States) Jerry Pritchett	467.5 kg (1,031 lb)	2017 Arnold Strongman Classic (Long bar)	2016	
(United States) Brian Shaw	467.5 kg (1,031 lb)	2017 during training (Long bar)	2016	
(United States) Dimitar Savatinov	467.5 kg (1,031 lb)	2023 World Strength Games	2023	
(Iceland) Benedikt Magnússon	465 kg (1,025 lb)	2016 World Deadlift Championships	2011	
(United States) Bobby Thompson	465 kg (1,025 lb)	2021 during training	2021	
(Canada) Jean-François Caron	463 kg (1,021 lb)	2018 Arnold Strongman Classic (Long bar)	2018	
(Georgia (country)) Konstantine Janashia	460 kg (1,014 lb)	2019 during training	2019	
(New Zealand) Mathew Ragg	460 kg (1,014 lb)	2024 Trans Tasman at Meatstock	2024	
(Iran) Matin Alimohammadi	460 kg (1,014 lb)	2024 Iran's Strongest Man (Long bar)	2024	
(England) Andy Bolton	457.5 kg (1,009 lb)	2009 BPC South East Qualifier	2006	
(Ukraine) Oleksandr Pekanov	455 kg (1,003 lb)	2014 during training	2014	
(Bosnia and Herzegovina) Nedžmin Ambešković	455 kg (1,003 lb)	2021 during training	2021	
(South Africa) Chris van der Linde	455 kg (1,003 lb)	2022 SA, Log, Deadlift & Axle	2022	
(United States) Evan Singleton	455 kg (1,003 lb)	2023 World Deadlift Championships	2021	
(New Zealand) Sean Logan	455 kg (1,003 lb)	2023 NZ Log & Deadlift	2023	
(Republic of Ireland) Sean Gillen	455 kg (1,003 lb)	2025 Raising the Dead 5	2025	
(England) Dean Evans	455 kg (1,003 lb)	2025 Night at the Deadlifts	2024	
(United States) Roy Orrantia	455 kg (1,003 lb)	2026 during training	2026	
(Ukraine) Oleh Pylypiak	455 kg (1,003 lb)	2026 SCL Czech Republic	2026	
(United States) Jordan Larson	453.5 kg (1,000 lb)	2019 Day of the Dead	2019	
(Ukraine) Oleksii Novikov	453.5 kg (1,000 lb)	2021 World Deadlift Championships	2021	
(Mexico) Gabriel Peña	453.5 kg (1,000 lb)	2021 World Deadlift Championships	2020	
(Australia) Hank Theunissen	453.5 kg (1,000 lb)	2023 Raising the Dead 3	2023	
(England) Paddy Haynes	453.5 kg (1,000 lb)	2025 World Deadlift Championships	2025	
(Ghana) Evans Nana Aryee	453.5 kg (1,000 lb)	2026 World Deadlift Championships	2026	
(Canada) James Jeffers	453.5 kg (1,000 lb)	2026 World Deadlift Championships	2026	
(United States) Bryce Johnson	453.5 kg (1,000 lb)	2026 World Deadlift Championships	2026	

- As of 13 September 2026

== All 1000 pounds+ deadlifts ==
Following table lists every instance a 1,000 pounds (453.6 kilograms) or more deadlift is achieved by above-mentioned athletes.

Rank	Athlete	Weight	Eqp.	Year	Context
1st place, gold medalist(s)	(Mexico) Raul Flores	511 kg (1,127 lb)	Suit	2026	2026 World Deadlift Championships
2nd place, silver medalist(s)	(Iceland) Hafþór Júlíus Björnsson	510 kg (1,124 lb)	Suit	2025	2025 World Deadlift Championships
3rd place, bronze medalist(s)	(Iceland) Hafþór Júlíus Björnsson	505 kg (1,113 lb)	Suit	2025	2025 Eisenhart Deadlift Championships
4	(Mexico) Raul Flores	504 kg (1,111 lb)	Suit	2026	during training
5	(Iceland) Hafþór Júlíus Björnsson	501 kg (1,105 lb)	Suit	2020	2020 World's Ultimate Strongman, Record Breakers
6	(England) Eddie Hall	500 kg (1,102 lb)	Suit	2016	2016 World Deadlift Championships
7	(Iran) Peiman Maheripour	492 kg (1,085 lb)	Suit	2021	during training
8	(Russia) Ivan Makarov	490 kg (1,080 lb)	Suit	2020	during training
9	(Georgia (country)) Ivan Makarov	490 kg (1,080 lb)	Suit	2023	during training
10	(Georgia (country)) Ivan Makarov	486 kg (1,071 lb)	Suit	2023	during training
11	(Iceland) Hafþór Júlíus Björnsson	485 kg (1,069 lb)	Suit	2026	during training
12	(Iran) Peiman Maheripour	485 kg (1,069 lb)	Suit	2024	2024 Iranian Deadlift Championships
13	(Georgia (country)) Ivan Makarov	484 kg (1,067 lb)	Suit	2025	during training
14	(Russia) Ivan Makarov	483 kg (1,065 lb)	Suit	2022	2022 Eisenhart Deadlift Championships
15, 16	(Mexico) Raul Flores	482.5 kg (1,064 lb)	Suit	2026	during training
17	(Estonia) Asko Karu	482 kg (1,063 lb)	Raw	2021	during training
17	(Mexico) Raul Flores	482 kg (1,063 lb)	Suit	2025	during training
18	(Iran) Peiman Maheripour	481 kg (1,060 lb)	Suit	2021	2021 WRPF World Championships
19	(Iceland) Hafþór Júlíus Björnsson	480 kg (1,058 lb)	Raw	2020	during training
20	(Iceland) Hafþór Júlíus Björnsson	480 kg (1,058 lb)	Suit	2025	during training
21	(Iceland) Hafþór Júlíus Björnsson	480 kg (1,058 lb)	Suit	2026	during training
22	(Iceland) Hafþór Júlíus Björnsson	480 kg (1,058 lb)	Suit	2026	2026 World Deadlift Championships
23	(Russia) Ivan Makarov	480 kg (1,058 lb)	Suit	2021	2021 WRPF World Championships
24	(Mexico) Raul Flores	480 kg (1,058 lb)	Suit	2025	2025 Mike Strongman aulex forum qualifier
25	(Iran) Peiman Maheripour	477.5 kg (1,053 lb)	Suit	2021	2021 WRPF World Championships
26	(Estonia) Rauno Heinla	476 kg (1,049 lb)	Suit	2022	2022 World Deadlift Championships
27, 28	(Georgia (country)) Ivan Makarov	476 kg (1,049 lb) x 2	Suit	2023	during training
29	(Iran) Peiman Maheripour	476 kg (1,049 lb)	Suit	2020	during training
30	(Iceland) Hafþór Júlíus Björnsson	475 kg (1,047 lb)	Suit	2026	2026 Enhanced Games
31	(Ukraine) Ivan Makarov	475 kg (1,047 lb)	Suit	2021	2021 World Deadlift Championships
32	(Ukraine) Pavlo Nakonechnyy	475 kg (1,047 lb)	Suit	2021	during training
33	(Australia) Mitchell Hooper	475 kg (1,047 lb)	Suit	2021	2021 Excalibur Max Deadlift
34	(Iceland) Hafþór Júlíus Björnsson	474.5 kg (1,046 lb)	Raw	2019	2019 Arnold Strongman Classic
35	(Iceland) Hafþór Júlíus Björnsson	473 kg (1,043 lb)	Raw	2019	during training
36	(England) Eddie Hall	472.5 kg (1,042 lb)	Suit	2017	2017 World's Strongest Man
37	(Iceland) Hafþór Júlíus Björnsson	472 kg (1,041 lb)	Raw	2018	2018 Arnold Strongman Classic
38, 39	(Ukraine) Ivan Makarov	472 kg (1,041 lb) x 2	Suit	2021	during training
40	(Estonia) Asko Karu	472 kg (1,041 lb)	Raw	2021	during training
41	(Iceland) Hafþór Júlíus Björnsson	470 kg (1,036 lb)	Raw	2025	during training
42	(United States) Trey Mitchell	470 kg (1,036 lb)	Raw	2024	2024 World Deadlift Championships
43	(Iceland) Hafþór Júlíus Björnsson	470 kg (1,036 lb)	Suit	2025	2025 World Deadlift Championships
44	(Iceland) Hafþór Júlíus Björnsson	470 kg (1,036 lb)	Suit	2025	2025 Eisenhart Deadlift Championships
45	(Iceland) Hafþór Júlíus Björnsson	470 kg (1,036 lb)	Suit	2026	2026 Enhanced Games II
46	(Russia) Ivan Makarov	470 kg (1,036 lb)	Suit	2019	2019 Geraklion Record Breakers
47	(England) Graham Hicks	470 kg (1,036 lb)	Suit	2023	2023 World Deadlift Championships
48	(Estonia) Rauno Heinla	470 kg (1,036 lb)	Suit	2024	2024 World Deadlift Championships
49	(Georgia (country)) Ivan Makarov	470 kg (1,036 lb)	Suit	2024	2024 World Deadlift Championships
50	(Canada) Mitchell Hooper	470 kg (1,036 lb)	Suit	2024	2024 World Deadlift Championships
51	(England) Adam Bishop	470 kg (1,036 lb)	Suit	2025	2025 World Deadlift Championships
52	(United States) Austin Andrade	470 kg (1,036 lb)	Suit	2025	2025 World Deadlift Championships
53	(Iceland) Hafþór Júlíus Björnsson	470 kg (1,036 lb)	Suit	2020	during training
54	(Russia) Ivan Makarov	470 kg (1,036 lb)	Suit	2019	during training
55	(Estonia) Rauno Heinla	470 kg (1,036 lb)	Suit	2020	during training
56	(Mexico) Raul Flores	470 kg (1,036 lb)	Suit	2025	during training
57	(Iceland) Hafþór Júlíus Björnsson	470 kg (1,036 lb)	Suit	2026	during training
58	(England) Adam Bishop	470 kg (1,036 lb)	Suit	2026	2026 World Deadlift Championships
59	(Mexico) Raul Flores	470 kg (1,036 lb)	Suit	2026	2026 World Deadlift Championships
60	(United States) Dimitar Savatinov	467.5 kg (1,031 lb)	Suit	2023	2023 World Strength Games
61	(United States) Jerry Pritchett	467.5 kg (1,031 lb)	Raw	2017	2017 Arnold Strongman Classic, Record Breakers
62	(United States) Brian Shaw	467.5 kg (1,031 lb)	Raw	2017	during training
63	(Iceland) Hafþór Júlíus Björnsson	465.5 kg (1,026 lb)	Raw	2020	2020 Arnold Strongman Classic
64	(Iceland) Hafþór Júlíus Björnsson	465.5 kg (1,026 lb)	Raw	2025	2025 Arnold Strongman Classic
65	(England) Eddie Hall	465 kg (1,025 lb)	Raw	2016	2016 Arnold Strongman Classic
66	(Iceland) Hafþór Júlíus Björnsson	465 kg (1,025 lb)	Suit	2020	2020 World's Ultimate Strongman, Record Breakers
67	(United States) Jerry Pritchett	465 kg (1,025 lb)	Raw	2016	2016 World Deadlift Championships
68	(Iceland) Benedikt Magnússon	465 kg (1,025 lb)	Suit	2016	2016 World Deadlift Championships
69	(England) Eddie Hall	465 kg (1,025 lb)	Suit	2016	2016 World Deadlift Championships
70	(United States) Brian Shaw	465 kg (1,025 lb)	Raw	2019	during training
71	(United States) Bobby Thompson	465 kg (1,025 lb)	Suit	2021	during training
72	(United States) Brian Shaw	463 kg (1,021 lb)	Raw	2016	2016 Arnold Strongman Classic
73	(Canada) Jean-François Caron	463 kg (1,021 lb)	Raw	2018	2018 Arnold Strongman Classic
74	(United States) Brian Shaw	463 kg (1,021 lb)	Raw	2019	2019 Arnold Strongman Classic
75	(England) Eddie Hall	463 kg (1,021 lb)	Suit	2015	2015 World Deadlift Championships
76, 77	(Estonia) Asko Karu	462 kg (1,019 lb) x 2	Raw	2021	during training
78	(England) Eddie Hall	462 kg (1,019 lb)	Suit	2015	2015 Arnold Expo
79	(Estonia) Asko Karu	462 kg (1,019 lb)	Raw	2021	during training
80	(Iceland) Benedikt Magnússon	461 kg (1,016 lb)	Suit	2014	2014 World Deadlift Championships
81	(United States) Brian Shaw	461 kg (1,016 lb)	Raw	2018	2018 Arnold Strongman Classic
82	(Iceland) Benedikt Magnússon	460.5 kg (1,015 lb)	Raw	2011	2011 MHP's Clash of the Titan's IV
83, 84	(Iceland) Hafþór Júlíus Björnsson	460 kg (1,014 lb) x 2	Suit	2025	during training
85, 86	(Georgia (country)) Ivan Makarov	460 kg (1,014 lb) x 2	Suit	2023	during training
87	(England) Eddie Hall	460 kg (1,014 lb)	Suit	2017	2017 World's Strongest Man
88	(Iceland) Hafþór Júlíus Björnsson	460 kg (1,014 lb)	Suit	2017	2017 World's Strongest Man
89	(United States) Brian Shaw	460 kg (1,014 lb)	Raw	2017	2017 World's Strongest Man
90	(New Zealand) Mathew Ragg	460 kg (1,014 lb)	Suit	2024	2024 Trans Tasman at Meatstock
91	(Iran) Matin Alimohammadi	460 kg (1,014 lb)	Suit	2024	2024 Iran's Strongest Man
92	(Estonia) Rauno Heinla	460 kg (1,014 lb)	Suit	2025	2025 Eisenhart Deadlift Championships
93	(Iceland) Hafþór Júlíus Björnsson	460 kg (1,014 lb)	Suit	2025	during training
94	(Iceland) Hafþór Júlíus Björnsson	460 kg (1,014 lb)	Suit	2025	during training
95	(Ukraine) Ivan Makarov	460 kg (1,014 lb)	Suit	2021	during training
96	(Georgia (country)) Ivan Makarov	460 kg (1,014 lb)	Suit	2025	during training
97	(Estonia) Rauno Heinla	460 kg (1,014 lb)	Suit	2020	during training
98	(Estonia) Rauno Heinla	460 kg (1,014 lb)	Suit	2025	during training
99	(Georgia (country)) Konstantine Janashia	460 kg (1,014 lb)	Suit	2019	during training
100	(Iran) Peiman Maheripour	460 kg (1,014 lb)	Suit	2021	during training
101	(England) Adam Bishop	460 kg (1,014 lb)	Suit	2025	during training
102	(Iceland) Hafþór Júlíus Björnsson	458.5 kg (1,011 lb)	Raw	2018	2018 Arnold Strongman Classic
103	(Iceland) Hafþór Júlíus Björnsson	458 kg (1,010 lb)	Raw	2024	2024 Rogue Invitational
104	(England) Andy Bolton	457.5 kg (1,009 lb)	Suit	2009	2009 BPC South East Qualifier
105, 106	(Estonia) Asko Karu	457 kg (1,008 lb) x 2	Raw	2021	during training
107	(Iceland) Hafþór Júlíus Björnsson	456.5 kg (1,006 lb)	Raw	2024	2024 Arnold Strongman Classic
108	(United States) Jerry Pritchett	456 kg (1,005 lb)	Raw	2016	2016 Arnold Strongman Classic
109	(Iceland) Hafþór Júlíus Björnsson	456 kg (1,005 lb)	Raw	2024	during training
110	(Canada) Mitchell Hooper	456 kg (1,005 lb)	Suit	2025	during training
111, 112, 113	(Mexico) Raul Flores	455 kg (1,003 lb) x 3	Suit	2026	during training
114, 115	(Iceland) Hafþór Júlíus Björnsson	455 kg (1,003 lb) x 2	Raw	2020	during training
116, 117	(Iran) Peiman Maheripour	455 kg (1,003 lb) x 2	Suit	2020	during training
118, 119	(Ukraine) Pavlo Nakonechnyy	455 kg (1,003 lb) x 2	Suit	2021	during training
120, 121	(Georgia (country)) Ivan Makarov	455 kg (1,003 lb) x 2	Suit	2025	during training
122	(England) Andy Bolton	455 kg (1,003 lb)	Suit	2006	2006 WPO Semifinals
123	(Ukraine) Oleksandr Pekanov	455 kg (1,003 lb)	Raw	2014	during training
124	(Iceland) Hafþór Júlíus Björnsson	455 kg (1,003 lb)	Raw	2025	during training
125	(Iceland) Hafþór Júlíus Björnsson	455 kg (1,003 lb)	Raw	2018	during training
126	(United States) Jerry Pritchett	455 kg (1,003 lb)	Raw	2019	2019 World Deadlift Championships
127	(Estonia) Rauno Heinla	455 kg (1,003 lb)	Suit	2019	2019 World Deadlift Championships
128	(Estonia) Rauno Heinla	455 kg (1,003 lb)	Suit	2020	2020 World's Ultimate Strongman, Record Breakers
129	(Australia) Mitchell Hooper	455 kg (1,003 lb)	Suit	2021	2021 Excalibur Max Deadlift
130	(South Africa) Chris van der Linde	455 kg (1,003 lb)	Suit	2022	2022 SA, Log, Deadlift & Axle
131	(Russia) Ivan Makarov	455 kg (1,003 lb)	Suit	2022	2022 Eisenhart Deadlift Championships
132	(United States) Evan Singleton	455 kg (1,003 lb)	Suit	2023	2023 World Deadlift Championships
133	(Estonia) Rauno Heinla	455 kg (1,003 lb)	Suit	2023	2023 World Deadlift Championships
134	(Georgia (country)) Ivan Makarov	455 kg (1,003 lb)	Suit	2023	2023 World Deadlift Championships
135	(New Zealand) Sean Logan	455 kg (1,003 lb)	Suit	2023	2023 NZ Log & Deadlift
136	(Republic of Ireland) Sean Gillen	455 kg (1,003 lb)	Suit	2025	2025 Raising the Dead 5
137	(England) Dean Evans	455 kg (1,003 lb)	Suit	2025	2025 Night at the Deadlifts
138	(Georgia (country)) Ivan Makarov	455 kg (1,003 lb)	Suit	2025	2025 Eisenhart Deadlift Championships
139	(Iran) Peiman Maheripour	455 kg (1,003 lb)	Suit	2021	during training
140	(Bosnia and Herzegovina) Nedžmin Ambešković	455 kg (1,003 lb)	Suit	2021	during training
141	(United States) Bobby Thompson	455 kg (1,003 lb)	Suit	2021	during training
142	(United States) Austin Andrade	455 kg (1,003 lb)	Suit	2024	during training
143	(England) Dean Evans	455 kg (1,003 lb)	Suit	2024	during training
144	(Mexico) Raul Flores	455 kg (1,003 lb)	Suit	2025	during training
145	(Iceland) Hafþór Júlíus Björnsson	455 kg (1,003 lb)	Suit	2026	during training
146	(Mexico) Raul Flores	455 kg (1,003 lb)	Suit	2026	2026 The Fit Weekend
147	(United States) Roy Orrantia	455 kg (1,003 lb)	Suit	2026	during training
148	(Ukraine) Oleh Pylypiak	455 kg (1,003 lb)	Suit	2026	2026 SCL Czech Republic
149	(Mexico) Raul Flores	455 kg (1,003 lb)	Suit	2026	during training
150	(United States) Brian Shaw	454 kg (1,001 lb)	Raw	2016	during training
151	(Iceland) Hafþór Júlíus Björnsson	454 kg (1,001 lb)	Raw	2024	during training
152	(England) Graham Hicks	454 kg (1,001 lb)	Suit	2022	2022 World Deadlift Championships
153	(Ukraine) Pavlo Nakonechnyy	454 kg (1,001 lb)	Suit	2022	2022 World Deadlift Championships
154	(Georgia (country)) Ivan Makarov	454 kg (1,001 lb)	Suit	2022	2022 World Deadlift Championships
155	(Canada) Mitchell Hooper	454 kg (1,001 lb)	Suit	2022	2022 World Deadlift Championships
156	(United States) Trey Mitchell	454 kg (1,001 lb)	Raw	2024	2024 World Deadlift Championships
157	(New Zealand) Mathew Ragg	454 kg (1,001 lb)	Suit	2024	2024 World Deadlift Championships
158	(United States) Austin Andrade	454 kg (1,001 lb)	Suit	2024	2024 World Deadlift Championships
159	(Canada) Mitchell Hooper	454 kg (1,001 lb)	Suit	2024	2024 World Deadlift Championships
160	(United States) Brian Shaw	453.5 kg (1,000 lb)	Raw	2018	during training
161	(Canada) Jean-François Caron	453.5 kg (1,000 lb)	Raw	2018	during training
162	(Mexico) Gabriel Peña	453.5 kg (1,000 lb)	Raw	2020	during training
163	(Canada) Benjamin Downs	453.5 kg (1,000 lb)	Raw	2025	during training
164	(United States) Jordan Larson	453.5 kg (1,000 lb)	Suit	2019	2019 Day of the Dead
165	(Ukraine) Oleksii Novikov	453.5 kg (1,000 lb)	Suit	2021	2021 World Deadlift Championships
166	(Ukraine) Pavlo Nakonechnyy	453.5 kg (1,000 lb)	Suit	2021	2021 World Deadlift Championships
167	(Mexico) Gabriel Peña	453.5 kg (1,000 lb)	Suit	2021	2021 World Deadlift Championships
168	(United States) Evan Singleton	453.5 kg (1,000 lb)	Suit	2021	2021 World Deadlift Championships
169	(England) Adam Bishop	453.5 kg (1,000 lb)	Suit	2021	2021 World Deadlift Championships
170	(Bosnia and Herzegovina) Nedžmin Ambešković	453.5 kg (1,000 lb)	Suit	2021	2021 World Deadlift Championships
171	(Australia) Hank Theunissen	453.5 kg (1,000 lb)	Suit	2023	2023 Raising the Dead 3
172	(England) Adam Bishop	453.5 kg (1,000 lb)	Suit	2025	2025 World Deadlift Championships
173	(United States) Austin Andrade	453.5 kg (1,000 lb)	Suit	2025	2025 World Deadlift Championships
174	(New Zealand) Mathew Ragg	453.5 kg (1,000 lb)	Suit	2025	2025 World Deadlift Championships
175	(Mexico) Raul Flores	453.5 kg (1,000 lb)	Suit	2025	2025 World Deadlift Championships
176	(England) Paddy Haynes	453.5 kg (1,000 lb)	Suit	2025	2025 World Deadlift Championships
177	(Mexico) Austin Andrade	453.5 kg (1,000 lb)	Suit	2026	2026 World Deadlift Championships
178	(Ghana) Evans Nana Aryee	453.5 kg (1,000 lb)	Suit	2026	2026 World Deadlift Championships
179	(Iceland) Hafþór Júlíus Björnsson	453.5 kg (1,000 lb)	Suit	2026	2026 World Deadlift Championships
180	(Canada) James Jeffers	453.5 kg (1,000 lb)	Suit	2026	2026 World Deadlift Championships
181	(United States) Bryce Johnson	453.5 kg (1,000 lb)	Suit	2026	2026 World Deadlift Championships

- As of 13 September 2026

== See also ==
- Deadlift
- Progression of the deadlift world record
- The World Deadlift Championships
- The Eisenhart Black Deadlift Championships
- List of national deadlift record holders
- Elephant bar
