= Progression of the deadlift world record =

Listed below is the all-time deadlift world record progression across all strength sports and the progressions of 7 individual deadlift world records across powerlifting, strongman and armlifting (sport of grip strength).

Key
Measured weight

== All-time progression across all strength sports ==
Listed below is the all-time deadlift world record progression across powerlifting (raw), powerlifting (equipped), and strongman.

Notes: Despite historical claims about Hermann Görner, Bob Peoples and Benoit Cote having lifted heavier numbers, it is Terry Todd and Wilbur Miller who are generally considered the first two individuals to break the 317.5 kg (700 lb) barrier in a documented and official setting with irrefutable evidence, hence initiating the inaugural official world record deadlift in 1964.

From 1964 to July 2014, powerlifting record stood as the all-time world record. In August 2014, strongman record surpassed it and to-date stands as the all-time world record.

Weight	Holder	Date	Event	Location	Sport	Ref.
322.1 kg (710 lb)	(United States) Terry Todd	Sep 1964	AAU Powerlifting Tournament	York, Pennsylvania, USA	Powerlifting (R)	
324.4 kg (715 lb)	(United States) Wilbur Miller	Sep 1964	AAU Powerlifting Tournament	York, Pennsylvania, USA	Powerlifting (R)	
328.9 kg (725 lb)	(United States) Wilbur Miller	Sep 1965	AAU Senior Nationals	York, Pennsylvania, USA	Powerlifting (R)	
335.6 kg (740 lb)	(United States) Terry Todd	Sep 1965	AAU Senior Nationals	York, Pennsylvania, USA	Powerlifting (R)	
355.6 kg (784 lb)	(United States) Don Cundy	Sep 1967	AAU Senior Nationals	York, Pennsylvania, USA	Powerlifting (R)	
357.5 kg (788.2 lb)	(Norway) Torkel Ravndal	Jun 1969	NBA Norwegian Powerlifting Championships	Oslo, Norway	Powerlifting (R)	
362.9 kg (800 lb)	(United States) Don Cundy	Aug 1969	AAU Senior Nationals	York, Pennsylvania, USA	Powerlifting (R)	
365 kg (804.7 lb)	(United States) Don Cundy	May 1970	NBA Powerlifting Duel	Oslo, Norway	Powerlifting (R)	
367.5 kg (810.2 lb)	(Norway) Torkel Ravndal	May 1970	NBA Powerlifting Duel	Oslo, Norway	Powerlifting (R)	
375 kg (826.7 lb)	(Norway) Torkel Ravndal	Nov 1970	NPA World Record Breakers	Tromsø, Norway	Powerlifting (R)	
400.3 kg (882.5 lb)	(United States) Jon Cole	Oct 1972	AAU Championships	Phoenix, Arizona, USA	Powerlifting (Eq)	
401.6 kg (885.5 lb)	(United States) Don Reinhoudt	May 1975	AAU/IPF Championships	Chattanooga, Tennessee, USA	Powerlifting (Eq)	
401.9 kg (886 lb)	(United States) Bill Kazmaier	Nov 1981	AAU/IPF Championships	Texas, USA	Powerlifting (Eq)	
410.0 kg (904 lb)	(United States) Dan Wohleber	Dec 1982	USPF Lake Erie Open	Sandusky, Ohio, USA	Powerlifting (Eq)	
410.0 kg (904 lb)	(United States) Doyle Kenady	Apr 1986	USPF Budweiser World Record Breakers	Honolulu, Hawaii, USA	Powerlifting (Eq)	
417.5 kg (920.4 lb)	(United States) Gary Heisey	Jul 1990	APF Senior Nationals	Pittsburgh, Pennsylvania, USA	Powerlifting (Eq)	
419.6 kg (925 lb)	(United States) Gary Heisey	Mar 1992	WPA World Submasters/Masters	Lancaster, Pennsylvania, USA	Powerlifting (Eq)	
422.5 kg (931.5 lb)	(United States) Garry Frank	Nov 2002	WPO semifinals	New Orleans, Louisiana, USA	Powerlifting (Eq)	
423 kg (932.6 lb)	(United Kingdom) Andy Bolton	Mar 2003	WPO finals	Columbus, Ohio, USA	Powerlifting (Eq)	
425 kg (937 lb)	(United Kingdom) Andy Bolton	Jun 2005	GPC-GB British Championships	Port Talbot, Wales	Powerlifting (Eq)	
426 kg (939.2 lb)	(Iceland) Benedikt Magnússon	Nov 2005	WPC - WPO European Semi Finals	Helsinki, Finland	Powerlifting (R)	
427.5 kg (942.5 lb)	(United Kingdom) Andy Bolton	Nov 2005	WPC - WPO European Semi Finals	Helsinki, Finland	Powerlifting (Eq)	
440 kg (970.0 lb)	(Iceland) Benedikt Magnússon	Nov 2005	WPC - WPO European Semi Finals	Helsinki, Finland	Powerlifting (R)	
440.5 kg (971.1 lb)	(United Kingdom) Andy Bolton	Mar 2006	WPO finals - Arnold Classic	Columbus, Ohio, USA	Powerlifting (Eq)	
455 kg (1,003.1 lb)	(United Kingdom) Andy Bolton	Nov 2006	WPO semifinals	Lake George, New York, USA	Powerlifting (Eq)	
457.5 kg (1,008.6 lb)	(United Kingdom) Andy Bolton	Apr 2009	BPC South East Championships	Eton, Berkshire, England	Powerlifting (Eq)	
460.4 kg (1,015 lb)	(Iceland) Benedikt Magnússon	Apr 2011	MHP's Clash of the Titan's IV	Dallas, Texas, USA	Powerlifting (R)	
461 kg (1,016.3 lb)	(Iceland) Benedikt Magnússon	Aug 2014	World Deadlift Championships	Leeds, England	Strongman	
462 kg (1,018.5 lb)	(United Kingdom) Eddie Hall	Mar 2015	Arnold Expo	Melbourne, Australia	Strongman	
463 kg (1,020.7 lb)	(United Kingdom) Eddie Hall	Jul 2015	World Deadlift Championships	Leeds, England	Strongman	
465 kg (1,025.1 lb)	(United Kingdom) Eddie Hall	Jul 2016	World Deadlift Championships	Leeds, England	Strongman	
465 kg (1,025.1 lb)	(United States) Jerry Pritchett	Jul 2016	World Deadlift Championships	Leeds, England	Strongman	
465 kg (1,025.1 lb)	(Iceland) Benedikt Magnússon	Jul 2016	World Deadlift Championships	Leeds, England	Strongman	
500 kg (1,102.3 lb)	(United Kingdom) Eddie Hall	Jul 2016	World Deadlift Championships	Leeds, England	Strongman	
501 kg (1,104.5 lb)	(Iceland) Hafþór Júlíus Björnsson	May 2020	World's Ultimate Strongman	Reykjavík, Iceland	Strongman	
505 kg (1,113.3 lb)	(Iceland) Hafþór Júlíus Björnsson	Jul 2025	Eisenhart Deadlift Championships	Bavaria, Germany	Strongman	
510 kg (1,124.4 lb)	(Iceland) Hafþór Júlíus Björnsson	Sep 2025	World Deadlift Championships	Birmingham, England	Strongman	
511 kg (1,126.56 lb)	(Mexico) Raul Flores	Sep 2026	World Deadlift Championships	Birmingham, England	Strongman	

== Progressions across individual strength sports ==
=== Powerlifting ===
In powerlifting, raw lifting allows only the use of a lifting belt, while equipped lifting allows the use of a deadlift suit, which is an elastic clothing made from very tight material (the suit tightens on the squat on the way down, storing energy, that gives an extra boost with the stored tension to break the floor).

==== Raw ====
Weight	Holder	Date	Event	Location	Ref.
322.1 kg (710 lb)	(United States) Terry Todd	Sep 1964	AAU Powerlifting Tournament	York, Pennsylvania, USA	
324.4 kg (715 lb)	(United States) Wilbur Miller	Sep 1964	AAU Powerlifting Tournament	York, Pennsylvania, USA	
328.9 kg (725 lb)	(United States) Wilbur Miller	Sep 1965	AAU Senior Nationals	York, Pennsylvania, USA	
335.6 kg (740 lb)	(United States) Terry Todd	Sep 1965	AAU Senior Nationals	York, Pennsylvania, USA	
355.6 kg (784 lb)	(United States) Don Cundy	Sep 1967	AAU Senior Nationals	York, Pennsylvania, USA	
357.5 kg (788.2 lb)	(Norway) Torkel Ravndal	Jun 1969	NBA Norwegian Powerlifting Championships	Oslo, Norway	
362.9 kg (800 lb)	(United States) Don Cundy	Aug 1969	AAU Senior Nationals	York, Pennsylvania, USA	
365 kg (804.7 lb)	(United States) Don Cundy	May 1970	NBA Powerlifting Duel	Oslo, Norway	
367.5 kg (810.2 lb)	(Norway) Torkel Ravndal	May 1970	NBA Powerlifting Duel	Oslo, Norway	
375 kg (826.7 lb)	(Norway) Torkel Ravndal	Nov 1970	NPA World Record Breakers	Tromsø, Norway	
383.3 kg (845 lb)	(United States) John Kuc	Nov 1972	AAU Men's World Championships	Harrisburg, Pennsylvania, USA	
385 kg (848.8 lb)	(United States) John Kuc	Nov 1974	IPF Men's World Championships	York, Pennsylvania, USA	
387.8 kg (855 lb)	(United States) Paul Wrenn	Aug 1976	AAU Senior Nationals	Arlington, Texas, USA	
390.1 kg (860 lb)	(United States) Don Reinhoudt	Aug 1976	AAU Senior Nationals	Arlington, Texas, USA	
402.5 kg (887.4 lb)	(South Africa) Gerrit Badenhorst	Oct 1990	WPC World Championships	Pescara, Italy	
409.6 kg (903 lb)	(United States) Mark Henry	Jul 1995	USAPL (ADFPA)	York, Pennsylvania, USA	
426 kg (939.2 lb)	(Iceland) Benedikt Magnússon	Nov 2005	WPC - WPO European Semi Finals	Helsinki, Finland	
440 kg (970.0 lb)	(Iceland) Benedikt Magnússon	Nov 2005	WPC - WPO European Semi Finals	Helsinki, Finland	
442.5 kg (975.5 lb)	(Iceland) Benedikt Magnússon	Oct 2010	FPO Bullfarm Championships	Helsinki, Finland	
460.4 kg (1,015 lb)	(Iceland) Benedikt Magnússon	Apr 2011	MHP's Clash of the Titan's IV	Dallas, Texas, USA	
465 kg (1,025.2 lb) (Sumo)	(United States) Danny Grigsby	Mar 2022	USPA Virginia Beach Classic	Virginia, USA	
467.5 kg (1,030.7 lb) (Sumo)	(United States) Danny Grigsby	Jul 2022	WRPF American Pro	Manassas, Virginia, USA	
487.5 kg (1,074.8 lb) (Sumo)	(United States) Danny Grigsby	Jul 2022	WRPF American Pro	Manassas, Virginia, USA	
492.5 kg (1,085.8 lb) (Sumo)	(South Africa) Colton Engelbrecht	Jul 2026	2026 Nikolai Kagansky Memorial Cup	Moscow, Russia	

==== Equipped ====
Weight	Holder	Date	Event	Location	Ref.
400.3 kg (882.5 lb)	(United States) Jon Cole (Note: Initially measured as 885 lb and later changed to 882.5 lb.)	Oct 1972	AAU Championships	Phoenix, Arizona, USA	
401.6 kg (885.5 lb)	(United States) Don Reinhoudt (Note: Initially measured as 895 lb and later changed to 885.5 lb.)	May 1975	AAU/IPF Championships	Chattanooga, Tennessee, USA	
401.9 kg (886 lb)	(United States) Bill Kazmaier	Nov 1981	AAU/IPF Championships	Texas, USA	
410.0 kg (904 lb)	(United States) Dan Wohleber (Note: Initially measured as 900 lb and later changed to 904 lb.)	Dec 1982	USPF Lake Erie Open	Sandusky, Ohio, USA	
410.0 kg (904 lb)	(United States) Doyle Kenady	Apr 1986	USPF Budweiser World Record Breakers	Honolulu, Hawaii, USA	
417.5 kg (920.4 lb)	(United States) Gary Heisey	Jul 1990	APF Senior Nationals	Pittsburgh, Pennsylvania, USA	
419.6 kg (925 lb)	(United States) Gary Heisey	Mar 1992	WPA World Submasters/Masters	Lancaster, Pennsylvania, USA	
422.5 kg (931.5 lb)	(United States) Garry Frank	Nov 2002	WPO semifinals	New Orleans, Louisiana, USA	
423 kg (932.6 lb)	(United Kingdom) Andy Bolton	Mar 2003	WPO finals	Columbus, Ohio, USA	
425 kg (937 lb)	(United Kingdom) Andy Bolton	Jun 2005	GPC-GB British Championships	Port Talbot, Wales	
427.5 kg (942.5 lb)	(United Kingdom) Andy Bolton	Nov 2005	WPC - WPO European Semi Finals	Helsinki, Finland	
440.5 kg (971.1 lb)	(United Kingdom) Andy Bolton	Mar 2006	WPO finals - Arnold Classic	Columbus, Ohio, USA	
455 kg (1,003.1 lb)	(United Kingdom) Andy Bolton	Nov 2006	WPO semifinals	Lake George, New York, USA	
457.5 kg (1,008.6 lb)	(United Kingdom) Andy Bolton	Apr 2009	BPC South East Championships	Eton, Berkshire, England	

==== IPF (International Powerlifting Federation) ====
===== Raw =====
Weight	Holder	Date	Event	Location	Ref.
383.3 kg (845 lb)	(United States) John Kuc	Nov 1972	AAU Men's World Championships	Harrisburg, Pennsylvania, USA	
385 kg (848.8 lb)	(United States) John Kuc	Nov 1974	IPF Men's World Championships	York, Pennsylvania, USA	
390 kg (859.8 lb)	(United States) John Kuc	Nov 1979	IPF Men's World Championships	Dayton, Ohio, USA	
392.5 kg (865.3 lb)	(United States) Ray Williams	Mar 2017	IPF/NAPF Arnold Slingshot Pro American	Ohio, USA	
398.5 kg (878.5 lb)	(United States) Ray Williams	Jun 2018	IPF World Classic Championships	Calgary, Canada	
399 kg (879.6 lb)	(United States) Jesus Olivares	Mar 2023	IPF Sheffield Championships	Sheffield, England	
410 kg (903.9 lb)	(United States) Jesus Olivares	Mar 2023	IPF Sheffield Championships	Sheffield, England	
410.5 kg (905.0 lb)	(Georgia (country)) Temur Samkharadze	Jul 2024	IPF Euro Muscle Show	Amsterdam, Netherlands	
411 kg (906.1 lb)	(Georgia (country)) Temur Samkharadze	Sep 2024	IPF Sub-Junior and Junior Championships	Valletta, Malta	

===== Equipped =====
Weight	Holder	Date	Event	Location	Ref.
401.6 kg (885.5 lb)	(United States) Don Reinhoudt	May 1975	AAU/IPF Championships	Chattanooga, Tennessee, USA	
401.9 kg (886 lb)	(United States) Bill Kazmaier	Nov 1981	AAU/IPF Championships	Texas, USA	
405 kg (892.9 lb)	(Sweden) Lars Norén	Nov 1987	IPF Men's World Championships	Fredrikstad, Norway	
406 kg (895.1 lb)	(Sweden) Lars Norén	Apr 1988	IPF World Championships	Gothenburg, Sweden	
406.5 kg (896.2 lb)	(Hungary) Tibor Mészáros	Nov 2001	IPF World Open Championships	Sotkamo, Finland	
407.5 kg (898.4 lb)	(Hungary) Tibor Mészáros	Nov 2002	IPF World Open Championships	Trenčín, Slovakia	
408 kg (899.5 lb)	(Hungary) Tibor Mészáros	May 2004	EPF Men's European Championships	Nymburk, Czech Republic	
408.5 kg (900.6 lb) (Sumo)	(Poland) Krzysztof Wierzbicki	Jul 2017	World Games	Wrocław, Poland	
420 kg (925.9 lb) (Sumo)	(Poland) Krzysztof Wierzbicki	Jul 2017	World Games	Wrocław, Poland	

=== Strongman ===
In strongman, raw lifting means lifting without a deadlift suit (which allows the use of a lifting belt & straps), while equipped lifting allows the use of a deadlift suit in addition to lifting belt & straps.

Includes: a.) Standard Deadlift bar, Power bar, Ironmind S-cubed Stiff bar and Flintstone bar depending on the evolution of the sport, b.) lifts from standard 9 inch height only (except for 2011-2013 when a 1 inch deficit was introduced), c.) both figure 6 and figure 8 (F8) straps, and d.) both single-ply (S) and multi-ply (M) deadlift suits.

==== All-time ====
Weight (Note: In 1981 Bill Kazmaier did a 415 kg (915 lb) strongman style standard deadlift with straps and in 1987 Jón Páll Sigmarsson did 427.5 kg (942 lb) with the exact same criteria. However the setup used did not allow the bar to stay at the standard 9 inches off the floor, making them 'slightly' elevated deadlifts.)	Holder	Date	Event	Location	Equipment	Ref.
410 kg (903.9 lb)	(South Africa) Gerrit Badenhorst	Oct 1996	World's Strongest Man	Port Louis, Mauritius	Belt & Straps on Flintstone stiff bar	
410 kg (903.9 lb)	(Ukraine) Oleksandr Pekanov	Jan 2005	Pojedynek Gigantów	Łódź, Poland	Belt & Straps on Power bar	
410 kg (903.9 lb)	(United States) Kevin Nee	Jul 2008	Viking Power Challenge	Gol, Norway	Suit(M), Belt & Straps on Power bar	
412.5 kg (909.4 lb)	(United Kingdom) Mark Felix	Mar 2011	Giants Live	London, England	Suit(M), Belt & Straps on Deadlift bar	
412.5 kg (909.4 lb)	(United Kingdom) Laurence Shahlaei	Mar 2011	Giants Live	London, England	Belt & Straps on Deadlift bar	
412.5 kg (909.4 lb)	(United Kingdom) Terry Hollands	Mar 2011	Giants Live	London, England	Belt & Straps on Deadlift bar	
412.5 kg (909.4 lb)	(United States) Brian Shaw	Mar 2011	Giants Live	London, England	Belt & Straps on Deadlift bar	
420 kg (925.9 lb)	(United Kingdom) Mark Felix	Mar 2011	Giants Live	London, England	Suit(M), Belt & Straps on Deadlift bar	
420 kg (925.9 lb)	(United Kingdom) Laurence Shahlaei	Mar 2011	Giants Live	London, England	Belt & Straps on Deadlift bar	
420 kg (925.9 lb)	(United States) Brian Shaw	Mar 2011	Giants Live	London, England	Belt & Straps on Deadlift bar	
430 kg (948.0 lb)	(United Kingdom) Laurence Shahlaei	Mar 2011	Giants Live	London, England	Belt & Straps on Deadlift bar	
430 kg (948.0 lb)	(United States) Brian Shaw	Mar 2011	Giants Live	London, England	Belt & Straps on Deadlift bar	
435 kg (959.0 lb)	(United Kingdom) Terry Hollands	Sep 2011	World's Strongest Man	North Carolina, USA	Belt & Straps on Stiff bar at a 1" deficit	
435 kg (959.0 lb)	(Lithuania) Žydrūnas Savickas	Sep 2011	World's Strongest Man	North Carolina, USA	Belt & Straps on Stiff bar at a 1" deficit	
435 kg (959.0 lb)	(United States) Brian Shaw	Sep 2011	World's Strongest Man	North Carolina, USA	Belt & Straps on Stiff bar at a 1" deficit	
440 kg (970.0 lb)	(Lithuania) Žydrūnas Savickas	Sep 2011	World's Strongest Man	North Carolina, USA	Belt & Straps on Stiff bar at a 1" deficit	
442.5 kg (975.5 lb)	(United States) Brian Shaw	Aug 2013	World's Strongest Man	Sanya, China	Belt & Straps on Stiff bar at a 1" deficit	
445 kg (981.1 lb)	(Iceland) Benedikt Magnússon	Mar 2014	Giants Live	Melbourne, Australia	Belt & Straps on Deadlift bar	
446 kg (983.2 lb)	(Iceland) Benedikt Magnússon	Aug 2014	World Deadlift Championships	Leeds, England	Suit(S), Belt & Straps(F8) on Deadlift bar	
446 kg (983.2 lb)	(United Kingdom) Eddie Hall	Aug 2014	World Deadlift Championships	Leeds, England	Suit(M), Belt & Straps on Deadlift bar	
461 kg (1,016.3 lb)	(Iceland) Benedikt Magnússon	Aug 2014	World Deadlift Championships	Leeds, England	Suit(M), Belt & Straps(F8) on Deadlift bar	
462 kg (1,018.5 lb)	(United Kingdom) Eddie Hall	Mar 2015	Arnold Expo	Melbourne, Australia	Brief, Belt & Straps(F8) on Deadlift bar	
463 kg (1,020.7 lb)	(United Kingdom) Eddie Hall	Jul 2015	World Deadlift Championships	Leeds, England	Brief, Belt & Straps(F8) on Deadlift bar	
465 kg (1,025.1 lb)	(United Kingdom) Eddie Hall	Jul 2016	World Deadlift Championships	Leeds, England	Suit(M), Belt & Straps(F8) on Deadlift bar	
465 kg (1,025.1 lb)	(United States) Jerry Pritchett	Jul 2016	World Deadlift Championships	Leeds, England	Belt & Straps on Deadlift bar	
465 kg (1,025.1 lb)	(Iceland) Benedikt Magnússon	Jul 2016	World Deadlift Championships	Leeds, England	Suit(S), Belt & Straps(F8) on Deadlift bar	
500 kg (1,102.3 lb)	(United Kingdom) Eddie Hall	Jul 2016	World Deadlift Championships	Leeds, England	Suit(M), Belt & Straps(F8) on Deadlift bar	
501 kg (1,104.5 lb)	(Iceland) Hafþór Júlíus Björnsson	May 2020	World's Ultimate Strongman	Reykjavík, Iceland	Suit(S), Belt & Straps(F8) on Deadlift bar	
505 kg (1,113.3 lb)	(Iceland) Hafþór Júlíus Björnsson	Jul 2025	Eisenhart Deadlift Championships	Bavaria, Germany	Suit(M), Belt & Straps(F8) on Deadlift bar	
510 kg (1,124.4 lb)	(Iceland) Hafþór Júlíus Björnsson	Sep 2025	World Deadlift Championships	Birmingham, England	Suit(M), Belt & Straps(F8) on Deadlift bar	
511 kg (1,126.6 lb)	(Mexico) Raul Flores	Sep 2026	World Deadlift Championships	Birmingham, England	Suit(M), Belt & Straps(F8) on Deadlift bar	

==== Elephant bar (Raw) ====
Weight	Holder	Date	Event	Location	Equipment	Ref.
464.9 kg (1,025 lb)	(United Kingdom) Eddie Hall	Mar 2016	Arnold Strongman Classic	Columbus, Ohio, USA	Belt & Straps(F8) on Elephant bar	
467.7 kg (1,031 lb)	(United States) Jerry Pritchett	Mar 2017	Arnold Strongman Classic	Columbus, Ohio, USA	Belt & Straps on Elephant bar	
472.2 kg (1,041 lb)	(Iceland) Hafþór Júlíus Björnsson	Mar 2018	Arnold Strongman Classic	Columbus, Ohio, USA	Belt & Straps on Elephant bar	
474.5 kg (1,046 lb)	(Iceland) Hafþór Júlíus Björnsson	Mar 2019	Arnold Strongman Classic	Columbus, Ohio, USA	Belt & Straps on Elephant bar	

=== Armlifting ===
==== Double overhand Apollon's Axle ====
Three notable features make Apollon's Axle hard to lift: the thick, nearly 2-inch diameter of the bar, its smooth surface and non-revolving wheels.

Note: The original Apollon's Axle was 1.93 inches thick. However, the IronMind Axle which was used for all of the records below has a thickness of 2 inches.

Weight	Holder	Date	Event	Location	Equipment	Ref.
228 kg (502.7 lb)	(United States) Rich Williams	Jun 2010	IronMind Grip contest	USA	Belt	
230 kg (507.1 lb)	(United States) Mike Burke	Jan 2013	Visegrip Viking - LA FitExpo	Los Angeles, California, USA	Belt	
235 kg (518.1 lb)	(United States) Mike Burke	Jan 2013	Visegrip Viking - LA FitExpo	Los Angeles, California, USA	Belt	
236.1 kg (520.5 lb)	(Ukraine) Igor Kupinsky	Dec 2019	Elite Grip Challenge - Melitopol	Melitopol, Ukraine	Belt	
237.5 kg (523.6 lb)	(United Kingdom) Carl Myerscough	Dec 2022	Armlifting World Championships	Las Vegas, Nevada, USA	Belt	
240 kg (529.1 lb)	(Russia) Kirill Sarychev	Dec 2025	WRPF World Championship XI	Moscow, Russia	Belt	

== See also ==
- Progression of the squat world record
- Progression of the bench press world record
- World record progression men's weightlifting
- World record progression women's weightlifting
