= The Eisenhart Black Deadlift Championships =

Annual strength competition

Tournament information
- Location: Neukirchen beim Heiligen Blut, Bavaria, Germany
- Month played: July
- Established: 2011
- Format: Deadlift competition

Current champion
- (Iceland) Hafþór Júlíus Björnsson (2025)

The Eisenhart Black Deadlift Championships is a biennial, global strength athletics competition featuring international strongmen and powerlifters from all over the world, competing exclusively in the deadlift. The competition was established in 2011 by strength and physical culture historian and sports promoter Sepp Maurer and is held once in every two years in the month of July in Bavaria, Germany.

The championships allow deadlifts to be performed either in equipped or raw standards and by using either the conventional or sumo stance. They use original Buddy Capps Texas Deadlift bar along with Eleiko calibrated plates. Since 2011, the championships have produced many national & regional records, 3 continental records, as well as the all-time world record when Hafþór Júlíus Björnsson pulled 505 kg (1,113 lb) in 2025.

== Heaviest lifts in championship history ==
=== Conventional deadlift ===
Weight	Athlete	Year	Category	Ref.
505 kg (1,113 lb); Former All-time World Record	(Iceland) Hafþór Júlíus Björnsson	2025	Strongman Equipped (with a deadlift suit and straps)	
483 kg (1,065 lb)	(Russia) Ivan Makarov	2022	Strongman Equipped (with a deadlift suit and straps)	
470 kg (1,036 lb)	(Iceland) Hafþór Júlíus Björnsson	2025	Strongman Equipped (with a deadlift suit and straps)	
465 kg (1,025 lb)	(Georgia (country)) Ivan Makarov	2023	Strongman Equipped (with a deadlift suit and straps)	
460 kg (1,014 lb)	(Estonia) Rauno Heinla	2025	Strongman Equipped (with a deadlift suit and straps)	
455 kg (1,003 lb)	(Georgia (country)) Ivan Makarov	2025	Strongman Equipped (with a deadlift suit and straps)	
455 kg (1,003 lb)	(Russia) Ivan Makarov	2022	Strongman Equipped (with a deadlift suit and straps)	
442.5 kg (976 lb)	(Israel) Vladislav Alhazov	2017	Strongman Raw (without a deadlift suit, with straps)	
440 kg (970 lb)	(United Kingdom) Graham Hicks	2023	Strongman Equipped (with a deadlift suit and straps)	
435 kg (959 lb)	(Iceland) Hafþór Júlíus Björnsson	2025	Strongman Equipped (with a deadlift suit and straps)	
430 kg (948 lb)	(Russia) Mikhail Shivlyakov	2018	Strongman Raw (without a deadlift suit, with straps)	
430 kg (948 lb)	(Czech Republic) Honza Jiruše	2025	Strongman Raw (without a deadlift suit, with straps)	
425 kg (937 lb)	(Israel) Vladislav Alhazov	2018	Strongman Raw (without a deadlift suit, with straps)	
425 kg (937 lb)	(Georgia (country)) Ivan Makarov	2023	Strongman Equipped (with a deadlift suit and straps)	
422.5 kg (931 lb)	(Israel) Vladislav Alhazov	2017	Strongman Raw (without a deadlift suit, with straps)	
421 kg (928 lb)	(Czech Republic) Honza Jiruše	2025	Strongman Raw (without a deadlift suit, with straps)	
420 kg (926 lb)	(United Kingdom) Eddie Hall	2015	Strongman Raw (without a deadlift suit, with straps)	
420 kg (926 lb)	(Russia) Mikhail Shivlyakov	2023	Strongman Raw (without a deadlift suit, with straps)	
420 kg (926 lb)	(Czech Republic) Honza Jiruše	2023	Strongman Raw (without a deadlift suit, with straps)	
420 kg (926 lb)	(United Kingdom) Graham Hicks	2023	Strongman Equipped (with a deadlift suit and straps)	
420 kg (926 lb)	(Estonia) Rauno Heinla	2025	Strongman Equipped (with a deadlift suit and straps)	
420 kg (926 lb)	(Czech Republic) Jan Lacina	2025	Strongman Equipped (with a deadlift suit and straps)	
420 kg (926 lb)	(Serbia) Albin Hasanović	2025	Strongman Equipped (with a deadlift suit and straps)	
410 kg (904 lb)	(Georgia (country)) Ivan Makarov	2025	Strongman Equipped (with a deadlift suit and straps)	
407.5 kg (898 lb)	(Russia) Mikhail Shivlyakov	2023	Strongman Raw (without a deadlift suit, with straps)	
405 kg (893 lb)	(United States) Fernando Arias	2023	Strongman Raw (without a deadlift suit, with straps)	
405 kg (893 lb)	(Germany) Patrick Eibel	2025	Strongman Raw (without a deadlift suit, with straps)	
400 kg (882 lb)	(Austria) Martin Wildauer	2014	Powerlifting Raw (without a deadlift suit or straps)	
400 kg (882 lb)	(United States) Steve Johnson	2017	Powerlifting Raw (without a deadlift suit or straps)	
400 kg (882 lb)	(United States) John Haack	2025	Powerlifting Raw (without a deadlift suit or straps)	
400 kg (882 lb)	(Slovakia) Čestmír Šimá	2018	Strongman Raw (without a deadlift suit, with straps)	
400 kg (882 lb)	(Russia) Mikhail Shivlyakov	2025	Strongman Raw (without a deadlift suit, with straps)	
400 kg (882 lb)	(Czech Republic) Honza Jiruše	2025	Strongman Raw (without a deadlift suit, with straps)	
400 kg (882 lb)	(Slovakia) Róbert Valach	2025	Strongman Raw (without a deadlift suit, with straps)	
400 kg (882 lb)	(United Kingdom) Graham Hicks	2023	Strongman Equipped (with a deadlift suit and straps)	
400 kg (882 lb)	(Serbia) Albin Hasanović	2025	Strongman Equipped (with a deadlift suit and straps)	

=== Sumo deadlift ===
Weight	Athlete	Year	Category	Ref.
490 kg (1,080 lb)	(Poland) Krzysztof Wierzbicki	2025	Hybrid Raw (without a deadlift suit, with straps)	
485 kg (1,069 lb)	(Bulgaria) Ventsislav Dimitrov	2023	Hybrid Raw (without a deadlift suit, with straps)	
485 kg (1,069 lb)	(Bulgaria) Ventsislav Dimitrov	2025	Hybrid Raw (without a deadlift suit, with straps)	
480 kg (1,058 lb)	(Poland) Krzysztof Wierzbicki	2025	Hybrid Raw (without a deadlift suit, with straps)	
452.5 kg (998 lb)	(Estonia) Rauno Heinla	2022	Hybrid Raw (without a deadlift suit, with straps)	
440 kg (970 lb)	(Poland) Krzysztof Wierzbicki	2025	Hybrid Raw (without a deadlift suit, with straps)	
430 kg (948 lb)	(Bulgaria) Ventsislav Dimitrov	2022	Hybrid Raw (without a deadlift suit, with straps)	
430 kg (948 lb)	(Bulgaria) Ventsislav Dimitrov	2023	Hybrid Raw (without a deadlift suit, with straps)	
422.5 kg (931 lb)	(Estonia) Rauno Heinla	2022	Hybrid Raw (without a deadlift suit, with straps)	
420 kg (926 lb)	(United States) Derek Thistlethwaite	2025	Hybrid Raw (without a deadlift suit, with straps)	
420 kg (926 lb)	(United States) Shane Hunt	2025	Hybrid Raw (without a deadlift suit, with straps)	
400 kg (882 lb)	(United States) Derek Thistlethwaite	2023	Hybrid Raw (without a deadlift suit, with straps)	
400 kg (882 lb)	(United States) Shane Hunt	2023	Hybrid Raw (without a deadlift suit, with straps)	
400 kg (882 lb)	(United States) Derek Thistlethwaite	2025	Hybrid Raw (without a deadlift suit, with straps)	
400 kg (882 lb)	(United States) Shane Hunt	2025	Hybrid Raw (without a deadlift suit, with straps)	
400 kg (882 lb)	(Germany) Moritz Mader	2025	Hybrid Equipped (with a deadlift suit and straps)	

Hybrid lifts done using a sumo stance and with straps are unique to the Eisenhart Black Deadlift Championships. They are not officially recognized under the rules of strongman or powerlifting (because sumo stance is prohibited in strongman, and straps are prohibited in powerlifting).

== See also ==
- Deadlift
- The World Deadlift Championships
- Progression of the deadlift world record
- List of people who have broken the 1000lb barrier in the deadlift
- List of national deadlift record holders
