= The World Deadlift Championships =

Annual strength competition

Tournament information
- Location: Various locations throughout United Kingdom and United States
- Month played: September
- Established: 2014
- Format: Deadlift competition

Current champion
- (Mexico) Raul Flores (2026)

The World Deadlift Championships is an annual global strongman competition featuring international strength athletes from all over the world, competing exclusively in the strongman deadlift. It was created by Giants Live and the championship focuses on the maximum deadlift in pursuit of the all-time world record deadlift. Having been held for 10 years, 9 of them featured the maximum deadlift event while in 2017, the event was changed to a 400 kg (882 lb) weight for the most repetitions in 60 seconds.

The championships allow deadlifts to be performed either in equipped or raw standards using only conventional stance adhering with the rules of strongman. Each year the winner is bestowed with the title 'World Deadlift Champion'. Since its inception in 2014, the championships have produced a total of 11 world records including the incumbent all-time world record of 511 kg (1,127 lb) by Raul Flores in 2026.

== World records ==
- Deadlift (for max) – 511 kg (1,127 lb) by Raul Flores (Mexico) (2026)
- Deadlift (for reps) – 400 kg (882 lb) x 7 reps by Hafþór Júlíus Björnsson (Iceland) (2026)

== Champions ==
Year	Champion	Runner-up	Third place	Host city
2014	(Iceland) Benedikt Magnússon	(England) Eddie Hall	(Austria) Martin Wildauer (England) Laurence Shahlaei	Leeds, England
2015	(England) Eddie Hall	(Iceland) Hafþór Júlíus Björnsson	(Estonia) Rauno Heinla (United States) Jerry Pritchett	Leeds, England
2016	(England) Eddie Hall	(Iceland) Benedikt Magnússon (United States) Jerry Pritchett		Leeds, England
2017	(Canada) JF Caron (Georgia (country)) Konstantine Janashia		(Iceland) Benedikt Magnússon	Manchester, England
2019	(Estonia) Rauno Heinla (United States) Jerry Pritchett		(England) Adam Bishop (United States) Rob Kearney (Bosnia and Herzegovina) Nedžmin Ambešković	Wembley, England
2021	(Ukraine) Ivan Makarov ^{1}	(Ukraine) Pavlo Nakonechnyy (United States) Evan Singleton (England) Adam Bishop (Ukraine) Oleksii Novikov (Mexico) Gabriel Peña (Bosnia and Herzegovina) Nedžmin Ambešković		Manchester, England
2022	(Estonia) Rauno Heinla	(England) Graham Hicks (Georgia (country)) Ivan Makarov ^{2} (Ukraine) Pavlo Nakonechnyy (Canada) Mitchell Hooper		Cardiff, Wales
2023	(England) Graham Hicks	(Estonia) Rauno Heinla (Georgia (country)) Ivan Makarov ^{2} (United States) Evan Singleton		Cardiff, Wales
2023 (Women)	(England) Lucy Underdown	(Wales) Rebecca Roberts		Cardiff, Wales
2024	(Estonia) Rauno Heinla (Canada) Mitchell Hooper (Georgia (country)) Ivan Makarov (United States) Trey Mitchell			Las Vegas, United States
2024 (Women)	(England) Lucy Underdown			Las Vegas, United States
2025	(Iceland) Hafþór Júlíus Björnsson	(England) Adam Bishop (United States) Austin Andrade		Birmingham, England
2026	(Mexico) Raul Flores	(Iceland) Hafþór Júlíus Björnsson	(England) Adam Bishop	Birmingham, England

^{1} While Makarov has declared for Russia, he competed for Ukraine at the 2021 World Deadlift Championships.
^{2} While Makarov has declared for Russia, he competed for Georgia at the 2022 and 2023 World Deadlift Championships.

== Heaviest lifts ==
=== In history (men) ===
==== Equipped ====
#	Weight	Competitor	Event location and name	Bar/ standard	World record?
1	511 kg (1,127 lb)	(Mexico) Raul Flores	Birmingham, England 2026 World Deadlift Championships; Giants Live Strongman Open	Standard/ multi ply suit	Yes
2	510 kg (1,124 lb)	(Iceland) Hafþór Júlíus Björnsson	Birmingham, England 2025 World Deadlift Championships; Giants Live Strongman Open	Standard/ multi ply suit	Yes
3	505 kg (1,113 lb)	(Iceland) Hafþór Júlíus Björnsson	Bavaria, Germany 2025 Eisenhart Black Deadlift Championships	Standard/ multi ply suit	Yes
4	501 kg (1,105 lb)	(Iceland) Hafþór Júlíus Björnsson	Reykjavík, Iceland 2020 World's Ultimate Strongman; Feats of Strength series	Standard/ single ply suit	Yes
5	500 kg (1,102 lb)	(England) Eddie Hall	Leeds, England 2016 World Deadlift Championships	Standard/ multi ply suit	Yes
6	485 kg (1,069 lb)	(Iran) Peiman Maheripour	Tehran, Iran 2024 Iran Strongest Men & Women's Deadlift Championship	Standard/ multi ply suit	No
7	483 kg (1,065 lb)	(Russia) Ivan Makarov	Bavaria, Germany 2022 Eisenhart Black Deadlift Championships	Standard/ multi ply suit	No
8	481 kg (1,060 lb)	(Iran) Peiman Maheripour	Moscow, Russia 2021 WRPF World Championships	Standard/ multi ply suit	No
9	480 kg (1,058 lb)	(Russia) Ivan Makarov	Moscow, Russia 2021 WRPF World Championships	Standard/ multi ply suit	No
9	480 kg (1,058 lb)	(Mexico) Raul Flores	Jalisco, Mexico 2025 Mike Strongman aulex forum qualifier	Standard/ multi ply suit	No
9	480 kg (1,058 lb)	(Iceland) Hafþór Júlíus Björnsson	Birmingham, England 2026 World Deadlift Championships; Giants Live Strongman Open	Standard/ multi ply suit	No

==== Raw ====
#	Weight	Competitor	Event location and name	Bar/ standard	World record?
1	474.5 kg (1,046 lb)	(Iceland) Hafþór Júlíus Björnsson	Columbus, United States 2019 Arnold Strongman Classic	Elephant/ raw	Yes
2	472 kg (1,041 lb)	(Iceland) Hafþór Júlíus Björnsson	Columbus, United States 2018 Arnold Strongman Classic	Elephant/ raw	Yes
3	470 kg (1,036 lb)	(United States) Trey Mitchell	Las Vegas, United States 2024 World Deadlift Championships	Standard/ raw	Yes
4	467.5 kg (1,031 lb)	(United States) Jerry Pritchett	Columbus, United States 2017 Arnold Strongman Classic	Elephant/ raw	Yes
5	465.5 kg (1,026 lb)	(Iceland) Hafþór Júlíus Björnsson	Columbus, United States 2025 Arnold Strongman Classic	Elephant/ raw	No
5	465.5 kg (1,026 lb)	(Iceland) Hafþór Júlíus Björnsson	Columbus, United States 2020 Arnold Strongman Classic	Elephant/ raw	No
7	465 kg (1,025 lb)	(United States) Jerry Pritchett	Leeds, England 2016 World Deadlift Championships	Standard/ raw	Yes
7	465 kg (1,025 lb)	(England) Eddie Hall	Columbus, United States 2016 Arnold Strongman Classic	Elephant/ raw	Yes
9	463 kg (1,021 lb)	(United States) Brian Shaw	Columbus, United States 2016 Arnold Strongman Classic	Elephant/ raw	No
9	463 kg (1,021 lb)	(Canada) Jean-François Caron	Columbus, United States 2018 Arnold Strongman Classic	Elephant/ raw	No
9	463 kg (1,021 lb)	(United States) Brian Shaw	Columbus, United States 2019 Arnold Strongman Classic	Elephant/ raw	No

=== In history (women) ===
#	Weight	Competitor	Event location and name	Bar/ standard	World record?
1	325 kg (717 lb)	(England) Lucy Underdown	Las Vegas, United States 2024 World Deadlift Championships	Standard/ single ply suit	Yes
2	318 kg (701 lb)	(England) Lucy Underdown	Columbus, United States 2026 Arnold Strongwoman Classic	Elephant/ raw	Yes (Elephant only)
3	317.5 kg (700 lb)	(England) Lucy Underdown	Cardiff, Wales 2023 World Deadlift Championships	Standard/ single ply suit	Yes
4	315 kg (694 lb)	(United States) Becca Swanson	Helsinki, Finland 2005 WPC WPO European Semi Finals	Power/ multi ply suit	Yes
5	311 kg (686 lb)	(England) Lucy Underdown	Aberdeen, Scotland 2024 Rogue Invitational	Standard/ single ply suit	No
5	311 kg (686 lb)	(England) Lucy Underdown	Columbus, United States 2026 Arnold Strongwoman Classic	Elephant/ raw	Yes (Elephant only)
7	310 kg (683 lb)	(United States) Becca Swanson	Helsinki, Finland 2005 WPC WPO Qualifiers	Power/ multi ply suit	Yes
8	309 kg (681 lb)	(United States) Jennifer Lyle	Columbus, United States 2026 Arnold Strongwoman Classic	Elephant/ raw	Yes (Elephant only)
9	306.5 kg (676 lb)	(England) Lucy Underdown	Columbus, United States 2025 Arnold Strongwoman Classic	Elephant/ raw	Yes (Elephant only)
10	305 kg (672 lb)	(United States) Becca Swanson	Chicago, United States 2005 WPC WPO Semifinals	Power/ multi ply suit	Yes
10	305 kg (672 lb)	(England) Lucy Underdown	Cardiff, Wales 2023 World Deadlift Championships	Standard/ single ply suit	Yes (Strongwoman only)
10	305 kg (672 lb)	(United States) Sumer Johnson	Roanoke, United States 2024 Cerberus Super Series Deadlift Championship	Standard/ multi ply suit	Yes (U82 Strongwoman only)

=== At the championships (men) ===
#	Weight	Competitor	Year	Bar	Record Set
1	511 kg (1,127 lb)	(Mexico) Raul Flores	2026	Standard	World Record
2	510 kg (1,124 lb)	(Iceland) Hafþór Júlíus Björnsson	2025	Standard	World Record
3	500 kg (1,102 lb)	(England) Eddie Hall	2016	Standard	World Record
4	480 kg (1,058 lb)	(Iceland) Hafþór Júlíus Björnsson	2026	Standard	-
5	476 kg (1,049 lb)	(Estonia) Rauno Heinla	2022	Standard	Estonian Record, World Record (over-40s)
6	475 kg (1,047 lb)	(Ukraine) Ivan Makarov ^{1}	2021	Standard	Ukrainian Record
7	470 kg (1,036 lb)	(England) Graham Hicks	2023	Standard	-
7	470 kg (1,036 lb)	(United States) Trey Mitchell	2024	Standard	World Record (raw)
7	470 kg (1,036 lb)	(Georgia (country)) Ivan Makarov ^{2}	2024	Standard	Georgian Record
7	470 kg (1,036 lb)	(Estonia) Rauno Heinla	2024	Standard	-
7	470 kg (1,036 lb)	(Canada) Mitchell Hooper	2024	Standard	-
7	470 kg (1,036 lb)	(Iceland) Hafþór Júlíus Björnsson	2025	Standard	-
7	470 kg (1,036 lb)	(England) Adam Bishop	2025	Standard	-
7	470 kg (1,036 lb)	(United States) Austin Andrade	2025	Standard	-
7	470 kg (1,036 lb)	(England) Adam Bishop	2026	Standard	-

=== At the championships (women) ===
#	Weight	Competitor	Year	Bar	Record Set
1	325 kg (717 lb)	(England) Lucy Underdown	2024	Standard	World Record
2	317.5 kg (700 lb)	(England) Lucy Underdown	2023	Standard	World Record
3	305 kg (672 lb)	(England) Lucy Underdown	2023	Standard	English Record
4	290 kg (639 lb)	(England) Lucy Underdown	2024	Standard	-
5	280 kg (617 lb)	(Wales) Rebecca Roberts	2023	Standard	Welsh Record
5	280 kg (617 lb)	(England) Lucy Underdown	2023	Standard	-

=== Continental records (men) ===
Region	Weight	Athlete	Nation	Year
North, Central America and Caribbean	511 kg (1,127 lb)	Raul Flores	Mexico	2026
Europe	510 kg (1,124 lb)	Hafþór Júlíus Björnsson	Iceland	2025
Asia	485 kg (1,069 lb)	Peiman Maheripour	Iran	2024
Oceania	475 kg (1,047 lb)	Mitchell Hooper	Australia	2021
Africa	460 kg (1,014 lb)	Rayno Nel	South Africa	2026
South America	420 kg (926 lb)	Lucas Veronezi	Brazil	2026
South America	420 kg (926 lb)	Willian Brito Piovezan	Brazil	2026

=== Continental records (women) ===
Region	Weight	Athlete	Nation	Year
Europe	325 kg (717 lb)	Lucy Underdown	England	2024
North, Central America and Caribbean	315 kg (694 lb)	Becca Swanson	United States	2005
Oceania	292.5 kg (645 lb)	Lydia Hantke	Australia	2025
Oceania	292.5 kg (645 lb)	Natalie Laalaai	Australia	2025
Africa	290 kg (639 lb)	Cherry Muchindu	Zambia	2026
South America	270 kg (595 lb)	Mariela Ortellado	Argentina	2019
Asia	232.5 kg (513 lb)	Munkhzul Sodnomdorj	Mongolia	2025

Note: above lists feature lifts made with a standard bar.

=== Records on other bars and standards ===
Lift details	Weight	Athlete	Nation	Year
Elephant bar (Standard 9" height)	474.5 kg (1,046 lb)	Hafþór Júlíus Björnsson	Iceland	2019
Power bar - Conventional (Standard 9" height)	460.4 kg (1,015 lb)	Benedikt Magnússon	Iceland	2011
Power bar - Sumo (Standard 9" height) ^{3}	492.5 kg (1,086 lb)	Colton Engelbrecht	South Africa	2026
Hummer tyre (Elevated 15" height)	549 kg (1,210 lb)	Oleksii Novikov	Ukraine	2022
Silver Dollar (Elevated 18" height)	580 kg (1,279 lb)	Rauno Heinla	Estonia	2022
Axle bar (Elevated 18" height)	545 kg (1,202 lb)	Roy Orrantia	United States	2026

^{3} This lift has been included as a reference - sumo deadlifts are prohibited and classified as illegal in strongman competitions.

=== 400 kg for reps ===
==== Best performances in history ====
#	Reps	Competitor	Year	Event	Record Set
1	7 reps	(Iceland) Hafþór Júlíus Björnsson	2026	Swaglift Day	World Record
2	6 reps	(Estonia) Rauno Heinla	2020	WUS Feats of Strength, Season 2	World Record
3	5 reps	(Iceland) Benedikt Magnússon	2011	Steve Gym Showdown	World Record
3	5 reps	(Georgia (country)) Konstantine Janashia	2017	World Deadlift Championships	Joint-world record
3	5 reps	(Canada) Jean-François Caron	2017	World Deadlift Championships	Joint-world record
3	5 reps	(Estonia) Rauno Heinla	2020	WUS Feats of Strength, Season 1	Joint-world record
3	5 reps	(England) Adam Bishop	2024	Britain's Strongest Man	-
3	5 reps	(Scotland) Tom Stoltman	2024	Britain's Strongest Man	-
3	5 reps	(South Africa) Rayno Nel	2026	World's Strongest Man	-

== Individual results ==
=== 2014 World Deadlift Championships ===
The 2014 World Deadlift Championships were held at the Headingley Stadium in Leeds, England on 9 August 2014 as the first event of 2014 Europe's Strongest Man. Benedikt Magnússon set a new world record with 461 kg (1,016 lb) and won the championship.

==== Results ====
#	Name	Weight
1	(Iceland) Benedikt Magnússon	461 kg (1,016 lb)
2	(England) Eddie Hall	446 kg (983 lb)
3	(Austria) Martin Wildauer	435 kg (959 lb)
3	(England) Laurence Shahlaei	435 kg (959 lb)
5	(Iceland) Hafþór Júlíus Björnsson	420 kg (926 lb)
5	(Sweden) Johannes Årsjö	420 kg (926 lb)
5	(England) Mark Felix	420 kg (926 lb)
8	(England) Graham Hicks	400 kg (882 lb)
8	(Lithuania) Vytautas Lalas	400 kg (882 lb)
8	(Poland) Krzysztof Radzikowski	400 kg (882 lb)
8	(England) Andy Bolton	400 kg (882 lb)
12	(Russia) Mikhail Koklyaev	No lift
X	(United States) Brian Shaw	Withdrew

==== Records ====
Nation	Name	Weight
World	Benedikt Magnússon	461 kg (1,016 lb)
(Iceland) Icelandic	Benedikt Magnússon	461 kg (1,016 lb)
(England) English	Eddie Hall	446 kg (983 lb)
(Austria) Austrian	Martin Wildauer	435 kg (959 lb)
(Sweden) Swedish	Johannes Årsjö	420 kg (926 lb)

=== 2015 World Deadlift Championships ===
The 2015 World Deadlift Championships were held at the Headingley Stadium in Leeds, England on July 11, 2015. Hall set a new world record with 463 kg (1,021 lb) and won the championship.

==== Results ====
#	Name	Weight
1	(England) Eddie Hall	463 kg (1,021 lb)
2	(Iceland) Hafþór Júlíus Björnsson	450 kg (992 lb)
3	(Estonia) Rauno Heinla	435 kg (959 lb)
3	(United States) Jerry Pritchett	435 kg (959 lb)
5	(England) Andy Bolton	430 kg (948 lb)
6	(Slovenia) Matjaz Belsak	400 kg (882 lb)
6	(Poland) Krzysztof Radzikowski	400 kg (882 lb)
6	(Latvia) Dainis Zageris	400 kg (882 lb)
6	(England) Mark Felix	400 kg (882 lb)
6	(England) Terry Hollands	400 kg (882 lb)
11	(Bulgaria) Dimitar Savatinov	360 kg (794 lb)
12	(Scotland) Luke Stoltman	No lift

==== Records ====
Nation	Name	Weight
World	Eddie Hall	463 kg (1,021 lb)
(England) English	Eddie Hall	463 kg (1,021 lb)
(Estonia) Estonian	Rauno Heinla	435 kg (959 lb)
(Slovenia) Slovenian	Matjaz Belsak	400 kg (882 lb)

=== 2016 World Deadlift Championships ===
The 2016 World Deadlift Championships were held at the 2016 Europe's Strongest Man event at the First Direct Arena in Leeds, England. Hall set a new world record, becoming the first person in history to deadlift 500 kg (1,102 lb) and won the championship.

==== Results ====
#	Name	Weight
1	(England) Eddie Hall	500 kg (1,102 lb)
2	(Iceland) Benedikt Magnússon	465 kg (1,025 lb)
2	(United States) Jerry Pritchett	465 kg (1,025 lb)
4	(Iceland) Hafþór Júlíus Björnsson	440 kg (970 lb)
5	(Lithuania) Marius Lalas	420 kg (926 lb)
5	(England) Mark Felix	420 kg (926 lb)
5	(England) Terry Hollands	420 kg (926 lb)
5	(England) Laurence Shahlaei	420 kg (926 lb)
9	(Sweden) Johannes Årsjö	400 kg (882 lb)
9	(Bulgaria) Dimitar Savatinov	400 kg (882 lb)
9	(England) Adam Bishop	400 kg (882 lb)
12	(Iceland) Stefan Solvi Petursson	No lift
12	(Poland) Mateusz Kieliszkowski	No lift

==== Records ====
Nation	Name	Weight
World	Eddie Hall	500 kg (1,102 lb)
(England) English	Eddie Hall	500 kg (1,102 lb)
(Iceland) Icelandic	Benedikt Magnússon	465 kg (1,025 lb)
(United States) American	Jerry Pritchett	465 kg (1,025 lb)

=== 2017 World Deadlift Championships ===
The 2017 World Deadlift Championships were held at the Giants Live Finals event in Manchester, England. In this edition, the championships were changed to a deadlift for the most repetitions in 60 seconds format with a fixed weight of 400 kg (882 lb). Jean-François Caron and Konstantine Janashia performed 5 repetitions each to equal Benedikt Magnússon's world record, and shared the championship win.

==== Results ====
#	Name	Repetitions
1	(Canada) JF Caron	5
1	(Georgia (country)) Konstantine Janashia	5
3	(Iceland) Benedikt Magnússon	3
4	(Lithuania) Žydrūnas Savickas	2
5	(Russia) Mikhail Shivlyakov	1
6	(Burkina Faso) Cheick "Iron Biby" Sanou	0
6	(United States) Nick Best	0
6	(United States) Robert Oberst	0
6	(England) Terry Hollands	0
6	(England) Laurence Shahlaei	0
6	(England) Eddie Hall	0

=== 2019 World Deadlift Championships ===
The 2019 World Deadlift Championships were held at the Wembley Arena in Wembley, England, as the opening event for Giants Live Wembley. In this edition, the championships returned to the max weight deadlift format. Rauno Heinla and Jerry Pritchett shared the championship.

==== Results ====
#	Name	Weight
1	(Estonia) Rauno Heinla	455 kg (1,003 lb)
1	(United States) Jerry Pritchett	455 kg (1,003 lb)
3	(United States) Rob Kearney	440 kg (970 lb)
3	(England) Adam Bishop	440 kg (970 lb)
3	(Bosnia and Herzegovina) Nedžmin Ambešković	440 kg (970 lb)
6	(United States) Martins Licis	420 kg (926 lb)
6	(Russia) Mikhail Shivlyakov	420 kg (926 lb)
6	(England) Mark Felix	420 kg (926 lb)
9	(Poland) Mateusz Kieliszkowski	400 kg (882 lb)
9	(Scotland) Tom Stoltman	400 kg (882 lb)
11	(Scotland) Luke Stoltman	No lift

==== Records ====
Nation	Name	Weight
(Estonia) Estonian	Rauno Heinla	455 kg (1,003 lb)
(Bosnia and Herzegovina) Bosnian	Nedžmin Ambešković	440 kg (970 lb)

=== 2021 World Deadlift Championships ===
The 2021 World Deadlift Championships were held at the AO Arena in Manchester, England, as the opening event for Giants Live World Open. Ivan Makarov won the championship.

==== Results ====
#	Name	Weight
1	(Ukraine) Ivan Makarov ^{1}	475 kg (1,047 lb)
2	(Ukraine) Pavlo Nakonechnyy	453.5 kg (1,000 lb)
2	(Ukraine) Oleksii Novikov	453.5 kg (1,000 lb)
2	(England) Adam Bishop	453.5 kg (1,000 lb)
2	(United States) Evan Singleton	453.5 kg (1,000 lb)
2	(Mexico) Gabriel Peña	453.5 kg (1,000 lb)
2	(Bosnia and Herzegovina) Nedžmin Ambešković	453.5 kg (1,000 lb)
8	(Russia) Mikhail Shivlyakov	425 kg (937 lb)
8	(Estonia) Rauno Heinla	425 kg (937 lb)
8	(Wales) Gavin Bilton	425 kg (937 lb)
8	(Scotland) Andy Black	425 kg (937 lb)

==== Records ====
Nation	Name	Weight
(Ukraine) Ukrainian	Ivan Makarov	475 kg (1,047 lb)
(Mexico) Mexican	Gabriel Peña	453.5 kg (1,000 lb)
(Bosnia and Herzegovina) Bosnian	Nedžmin Ambešković	453.5 kg (1,000 lb)
(Wales) Welsh	Gavin Bilton	425 kg (937 lb)

=== 2022 World Deadlift Championships ===
The 2022 World Deadlift Championships were held at the Cardiff International Arena in Cardiff, Wales, as the opening event for Giants Live World Open. Rauno Heinla won the championship, and as a result of another nationality change, Ivan Makarov became the first strongman to hold the national deadlift record for three different countries.

==== Results ====
#	Name	Weight
1	(Estonia) Rauno Heinla	476 kg (1,049 lb)
2	(Georgia (country)) Ivan Makarov ^{2}	454 kg (1,001 lb)
2	(England) Graham Hicks	454 kg (1,001 lb)
2	(Ukraine) Pavlo Nakonechnyy	454 kg (1,001 lb)
2	(Canada) Mitchell Hooper	454 kg (1,001 lb)
6	(Ukraine) Oleksii Novikov	425.5 kg (938 lb)
6	(United States) Evan Singleton	425.5 kg (938 lb)
6	(Wales) Gavin Bilton	425.5 kg (938 lb)
9	(Scotland) Andy Black	400 kg (882 lb)
9	(England) Shane Flowers	400 kg (882 lb)
9	(Republic of Ireland) Pa O'Dwyer	400 kg (882 lb)

==== Records ====
Nation	Name	Weight
World (over-40s)	Rauno Heinla	476 kg (1,049 lb)
(Estonia) Estonian	Rauno Heinla	476 kg (1,049 lb)
(Georgia (country)) Georgian	Ivan Makarov	453.5 kg (1,000 lb)
(Wales) Welsh	Gavin Bilton	425.5 kg (938 lb)

=== 2023 World Deadlift Championships ===
The 2023 World Deadlift Championships were held at the Cardiff International Arena in Cardiff, Wales, as the opening event for Giants Live World Open. Graham Hicks won the championship. This was the first tournament to have female competitors, with Lucy Underdown setting a new women's record with 317.5 kg (700 lb).

==== Results ====
#	Name	Weight
1	(England) Graham Hicks	470 kg (1,036 lb)
2	(Estonia) Rauno Heinla	455 kg (1,003 lb)
2	(Georgia (country)) Ivan Makarov ^{2}	455 kg (1,003 lb)
2	(United States) Evan Singleton	455 kg (1,003 lb)
5	(Mexico) Austin Andrade	430 kg (948 lb)
5	(Wales) Gavin Bilton	430 kg (948 lb)
5	(United States) Jamal Browner	430 kg (948 lb)
5	(England) Shane Flowers	430 kg (948 lb)
9	(Ukraine) Oleksii Novikov	400 kg (882 lb)
9	(Ghana) Evans Nana	400 kg (882 lb)
9	(Scotland) Luke Stoltman	400 kg (882 lb)
9	(United States) Rob Kearney	400 kg (882 lb)
9	(Republic of Ireland) Pa O'Dwyer	400 kg (882 lb)
14 (1F)	(England) Lucy Underdown	317.5 kg (700 lb)
15 (2F)	(Wales) Rebecca Roberts	280 kg (617 lb)
16	(Poland) Oskar Ziółkowski	No Lift

==== Records ====
Nation	Name	Weight
(Georgia (country)) Georgian	Ivan Makarov	455 kg (1,003 lb)
(Wales) Welsh	Gavin Bilton	430 kg (948 lb)
(Ghana) Ghanaian	Evans Nana	400 kg (882 lb)
World (women)	Lucy Underdown	317.5 kg (700 lb)
(England) English (women)	Lucy Underdown	317.5 kg (700 lb)
(Wales) Welsh (women)	Rebecca Roberts	280 kg (617 lb)

=== 2024 World Deadlift Championships ===
The 2024 World Deadlift Championships were held in Las Vegas, Nevada, as the opening event for Giants Live USA Strongman Championships. Trey Mitchell, Rauno Heinla, Ivan Makarov and Mitchell Hooper shared the championship, and Lucy Underdown participated alone in the women's division and broke her own record.

==== Results ====
#	Name	Weight
1	(United States) Trey Mitchell	470 kg (1,036 lb)
1	(Estonia) Rauno Heinla	470 kg (1,036 lb)
1	(Georgia (country)) Ivan Makarov	470 kg (1,036 lb)
1	(Canada) Mitchell Hooper	470 kg (1,036 lb)
5	(Mexico) Austin Andrade	454 kg (1,001 lb)
5	(New Zealand) Mathew Ragg	454 kg (1,001 lb)
7	(England) Graham Hicks	425 kg (937 lb)
7	(Ukraine) Oleksii Novikov	425 kg (937 lb)
7	(Burkina Faso) Cheick "Iron Biby" Sanou	425 kg (937 lb)
7	(United States) Evan Singleton	425 kg (937 lb)
7	(Australia) Eddie Williams	425 kg (937 lb)
12	(Scotland) Luke Stoltman	400 kg (882 lb)
12	(Scotland) Tom Stoltman	400 kg (882 lb)
14 (1F)	(England) Lucy Underdown	325 kg (717 lb)

==== Records ====
Nation	Name	Weight
World (Raw only)	Trey Mitchell	470 kg (1,036 lb)
(United States) American	Trey Mitchell	470 kg (1,036 lb)
(Georgia (country)) Georgian	Ivan Makarov	470 kg (1,036 lb)
(Mexico) Mexican	Austin Andrade	454 kg (1,001 lb)
(Burkina Faso) Burkinabe	Cheick "Iron Biby" Sanou	425 kg (937 lb)
World (women)	Lucy Underdown	325 kg (717 lb)
(England) English (women)	Lucy Underdown	325 kg (717 lb)

=== 2025 World Deadlift Championships ===
The 2025 World Deadlift Championships were held at the Utilita Arena Birmingham in Birmingham, as the opening event for Giants Live World Open. Hafþór Júlíus Björnsson returned to the championships and broke both his own all-time world record as well as the long standing championship record by lifting 510 kg (1,124 lb), winning the championship before proceeding to do the rest of the 6-event Giants Live World Open, and winning the entire competition as well.

==== Results ====
#	Name	Weight
1	(Iceland) Hafþór Júlíus Björnsson	510 kg (1,124 lb)
2	(England) Adam Bishop	470 kg (1,036 lb)
2	(Mexico) Austin Andrade	470 kg (1,036 lb)
4	(New Zealand) Mathew Ragg	453.5 kg (1,000 lb)
4	(Mexico) Raul Flores	453.5 kg (1,000 lb)
4	(England) Paddy Haynes	453.5 kg (1,000 lb)
7	(Estonia) Rauno Heinla	440 kg (970 lb)
7	(United States) Bryce Johnson	440 kg (970 lb)
7	(Wales) Gavin Bilton	440 kg (970 lb)
10	(Canada) Tristain Hoath	420 kg (926 lb)
10	(United States) Evan Singleton	420 kg (926 lb)
10	(Australia) Eddie Williams	420 kg (926 lb)
13	(Scotland) Luke Stoltman	400 kg (882 lb)
14	(Ukraine) Pavlo Nakonechnyy	No Lift

==== Records ====
Nation	Name	Weight
World	Hafþór Júlíus Björnsson	510 kg (1,124 lb)
(Iceland) Icelandic	Hafþór Júlíus Björnsson	510 kg (1,124 lb)
(Wales) Welsh	Gavin Bilton	440 kg (970 lb)

== See also ==
- Deadlift
- The Eisenhart Black Deadlift Championships
- Progression of the deadlift world record
- List of people who have broken the 1000lb barrier in the deadlift
- List of national deadlift record holders
- Elephant bar
