= 2019 World's Ultimate Strongman =

Competition information
- Dates: 24–25 October 2019
- Venue: Burj Khalifa Fountains (Day 1); Meydan Racecourse (Day 2)
- Location: Dubai
- Country: United Arab Emirates
- Athletes participating: 14
- Nations participating: 11

Champion(s)
- (Poland) Mateusz Kieliszkowski

The 2019 World's Ultimate Strongman took place in Dubai, United Arab Emirates between October 24 and 25. The winner of the inaugural World's Ultimate Strongman Hafþór Júlíus Björnsson did not partake this year due to taking a small break from competing. 2019 World's Strongest Man Martins Licis also did not partake due to injury. The competition had four-time World's Strongest Man Žydrūnas Savickas as a referee; 2017 World's Strongest Man Eddie Hall and 2016 Europe's Strongest Man Laurence Shahlaei were commentators of the event.

This years event was held over two days with first day consisting of only one event; the max deadlift. This event was performed with the Burj Khalifa in the background. The second day and the remainder of the events were performed at the Meydan Racecourse. This is also where the athletes were staying for the competition.

== Participants ==
- Matjaz Belsak (SLO)
- Jean-François Caron (CAN)
- Ramin Farajnejad (IRI)
- Rauno Heinla (EST)
- Terry Hollands (UK)
- Mateusz Kieliszkowski (POL)
- Oleksii Novikov (UKR)
- Jerry Pritchett (USA)
- Krzysztof Radzikowski (POL)
- Cheick Sanou (BUR)
- Brian Shaw (USA)
- Mikhail Shivlyakov (RUS)
- Luke Stoltman (UK)
- Tom Stoltman (UK)

== Results of events ==
=== Event 1: Max Deadlift ===
- Starting Weight: 400 kilograms (880 lb)
- Notes: Athletes were allowed to skip weight increments.

#	Athlete	Nation	Weight	Event Points	Overall Points
1	Rauno Heinla	Estonia	450 kilograms (990 lb)	14	14
2	Mikhail Shivlyakov	Russia	440 kilograms (970 lb)	12.5	12.5
2	Jerry Pritchett	United States	440 kilograms (970 lb)	12.5	12.5
4	Tom Stoltman	United Kingdom	430 kilograms (950 lb)	11	11
5	Mateusz Kieliszkowski	Poland	420 kilograms (930 lb)	9	9
5	JF Caron	Canada	420 kilograms (930 lb)	9	9
5	Ramin Farajnejad	Iran	420 kilograms (930 lb)	9	9
6	Luke Stoltman	United Kingdom	400 kilograms (880 lb)	4	4
6	Brian Shaw	United States	400 kilograms (880 lb)	4	4
6	Oleksii Novikov	Ukraine	400 kilograms (880 lb)	4	4
6	Matjaz Belsak	Slovenia	400 kilograms (880 lb)	4	4
6	Cheick Sanou (Note: Prior to the start of the competition, Cheick Sanou's luggage was lost in transit. This meant he completed this event without the use of a deadlift suit.)	Burkina Faso	400 kilograms (880 lb)	4	4
6	Krzysztof Radzikowski	Poland	400 kilograms (880 lb)	4	4
6	Terry Hollands	United Kingdom	400 kilograms (880 lb)	4	4

=== Event 2: Truck Pull ===
- Weight: 23,000 kilograms (51,000 lb)
- Course Length: 30 metres (98 ft)

#	Athlete	Nation	Time	Event Points	Overall Points
1	Mateusz Kieliszkowski	Poland	55.90	14	23
2	Krzysztof Radzikowski	Poland	1:06.18	13	17
3	Brian Shaw	United States	1:11.56	12	16
4	Terry Hollands (Note: Terry Hollands withdrew from the competition after this event.)	United Kingdom	1:14.16	11	15
5	Luke Stoltman	United Kingdom	28.9 metres (95 ft)	10	14
6	Rauno Heinla	Estonia	27.2 metres (89 ft)	9	25
7	Tom Stoltman	United Kingdom	27.0 metres (88.6 ft)	8	19
8	JF Caron	Canada	26.5 metres (87 ft)	7	16
9	Oleksii Novikov	Ukraine	25.4 metres (83 ft)	6	10
10	Ramin Farajnejad	Iran	23.0 metres (75.5 ft)	5	14
11	Matjaz Belsak	Slovenia	22.7 metres (74 ft)	4	8
12	Cheick Sanou	Burkina Faso	22.6 metres (74 ft)	3	7
13	Mikhail Shivlyakov	Russia	21.2 metres (70 ft)	2	14.5
14	Jerry Pritchett	United States	19.2 metres (63 ft)	1	13.5

=== Event 3: Log Lift ===
- Weight: 180 kilograms (400 lb) log for repetitions

#	Athlete	Nation	Repetitions	Event Points	Overall Points
1	Cheick Sanou	Burkina Faso	5	14	21
2	Mateusz Kieliszkowski	Poland	4	12.5	27.5
2	Luke Stoltman	United Kingdom	4	12.5	26.5
4	Brian Shaw (Note: Brian Shaw was first awarded 2 reps. However, the referee awarded him a 3rd rep as the floor had given way when attempting his 3rd repetition.)	United States	3	9.5	25.5
4	Oleksii Novikov	Ukraine	3	9.5	19.5
4	Matjaz Belsak	Slovenia	3	9.5	17.5
4	Mikhail Shivlyakov	Russia	3	9.5	24
8	Rauno Heinla	Estonia	2	6.5	29.5
8	Tom Stoltman	United Kingdom	2	6.5	25.5
8	Krzysztof Radzikowski	Poland	1	5	22
—	Ramin Farajnejad	Iran	0	0	14
—	JF Caron	Canada	0	0	16
—	Jerry Pritchett	United States	0	0	13.5

=== Event 4: Carry Medley ===
- Weight: 300 kilograms (660 lb) yoke, 180 kilograms (400 lb) shield
- Course Length: 15 metres (49 ft)

#	Athlete	Nation	Time	Event Points	Overall Points
1	Oleksii Novikov	Ukraine	16.40	14	33.5
2	Luke Stoltman	United Kingdom	17.72	13	39.5
3	Mateusz Kieliszkowski	Poland	17.76	12	47.5
4	JF Caron	Canada	18.50	11	25.5
5	Ramin Farajnejad	Iran	18.95	10	27
6	Matjaz Belsak	Slovenia	19.30	9	26.5
7	Tom Stoltman	United Kingdom	19.34	8	33.5
8	Cheick Sanou (Note: Cheick Sanou sustained an injury in this event and took no further part in the competition.)	Burkina Faso	19.37	7	28
9	Brian Shaw	United States	20.84	6	31.5
10	Mikhail Shivlyakov	Russia	20.87	5	29
11	Jerry Pritchett	United States	26.21	4	17.5
12	Rauno Heinla	Estonia	28 metres (92 ft)	3	32.5
13	Krzysztof Radzikowski (Note: Krzysztof Radzikowski sustained an injury in this event and took no further part in the competition.)	Poland	20.5 metres (67 ft)	2	25

=== Event 5: Atlas Stones ===
- Weight: 10 stone series ranging from 100–200 kilograms (220–440 lb)

#	Athlete	Nation	Time	Event Points	Overall Points
1	Tom Stoltman	United Kingdom	10 in 40.70	14	47.5
2	Brian Shaw	United States	10 in 1:02.21	13	44.5
3	JF Caron	Canada	10 in 1:39.06	12	39
4	Luke Stoltman	United Kingdom	10 in 2:10.00	11	50.5
5	Rauno Heinla	Estonia	9 in 2:52.00	10	42.5
6	Oleksii Novikov	Ukraine	8 in 33.00	9	42.5
7	Mateusz Kieliszkowski (Note: Mateusz Kieliszkowski injured his right bicep during the Carry Medley, however, he still took part in this event.)	Poland	8 in 2:30.00	8	55.5
8	Ramin Farajnejad	Iran	7 in 46.00	7	31
9	Mikhail Shivlyakov	Russia	7 in 1:01.00	6	35
10	Matjaz Belsak	Slovenia	7 in 1:53.35	5	31.5
11	Jerry Pritchett	United States	6 in 1:03.00	4	21.5

== Final results ==
#	Athlete	Nation	Points
1st place, gold medalist(s)	Mateusz Kieliszkowski	Poland	55.5
2nd place, silver medalist(s)	Luke Stoltman	United Kingdom	50.5
3rd place, bronze medalist(s)	Tom Stoltman	United Kingdom	47.5
4	Brian Shaw	United States	44.5
5	Rauno Heinla	Estonia	42.5
5	Oleksii Novikov	Ukraine	42.5
7	JF Caron	Canada	39
8	Mikhail Shivlyakov	Russia	35
9	Matjaz Belsak	Slovenia	31.5
10	Ramin Farajnejad	Iran	31
11	Cheick Sanou	Burkina Faso	28
12	Krzysztof Radzikowski	Poland	24
13	Jerry Pritchett	United States	21.5
14	Terry Hollands	United Kingdom	15
