= Raul Flores =

Raul Flores may refer to:

- Raul Flores (murder victim)
- Raul Flores (strongman)
