= Asko =

Asko or ASKO may refer to:

- Asko (name), a male given name common in Finland and Estonia
- Askø, a Danish island
- Asko Cylinda or Asko Appliances AB, a Swedish company producing household appliances
- Asko|Schönberg, a Dutch chamber orchestra
- ASKO Kara, a Togolese football club
- ASKÖ Pasching, an Austrian football club
- ASKÖ (Austria), Association for Sport and Physical Culture in Austria (German: Arbeitsgemeinschaft für Sport und Körperkultur in Österreich)
- ASKO Norge AS, the wholesale branch of Norwegian grocery supplier NorgesGruppen.

== See also ==
- Askos (disambiguation)
