= Pavlo Nakonechnyy =

Ukrainian professional strongman and powerlifter

Personal information
- Nicknames: "Wide Pavlo" "the Ukrainian Hulk"
- Born: Pavlo Nakonechnyy; 12 July 1997 (age 28) Lviv, Ukraine
- Occupation: Strongman
- Height: 6 ft 4 in (1.93 m)
- Weight: 165–182 kg (364–401 lb)

Sport
- Sport: Strongman
Medal record
Strongman
Representing Ukraine
Arnold Strongman Classic
6th	2023 Arnold Strongman Classic
Rogue Invitational
5th	2022 Rogue Invitational
Giants Live
4th	2021 Giants Live World Open
1st	2022 Giants Live World Open
4th	2022 Giants Live World Tour Finals

Pavlo Nakonechnyy (born 12 July 1997) is a Ukrainian strongman and powerlifter.

He is best known for his prowess in deadlifting, having pulled 390 kg (860 lb) in powerlifting and 454 kg (1,001 lb) in strongman standards.

== Career ==
=== Powerlifting ===
Nakonechnyy began competing at age 14. Rapidly growing in strength and size, he won his first Global Powerlifting Federation (GPF) Junior World Championship at age 16. He went on to twice win the International Powerlifting Federation (IPF) World University Powerlifting Cup in 2016 and 2017. While competing in powerlifting, his main rival was Great Britain's Luke Richardson. At 2018 EPF European Classic Powerlifting Championships Juniors, Nakonechnyy and Richardson tied (a rare occurrence in powerlifting), with both men achieving totals of 1,010.5 kg (2,228 lb). However, due to his higher body-weight, Nakonechnyy was relegated to second place. In 2019, he won the open division of the World Raw Powerlifting Federation (WRPF) World Championships.

=== Strongman ===
In 2018, Nakonechnyy won the Arnold Amateur Europe show, earning a place to compete in the Arnold Amateur World Championships. However, Nakonechnyy pulled his biceps during an attempt to deadlift 415 kg (915 lb), thus sidelining him from competing at the 2019 WPRF Open World Championships. He returned to training the following year and competed in 2021 World Deadlift Championships sharing 2nd place behind Ivan Makarov after deadlifting 453.5 kg (1,000 lb) and finishing 4th place overall in the full Giants Live World Open competition. In 2022 World Deadlift Championships, he deadlifted 454 kg (1,001 lb) and again shared 2nd place behind Rauno Heinla.

During the 2023 Arnold Strongman Classic (ASC) in Columbus, Ohio, Nakonechnyy sustained a knee injury during the deadlift event. The extent of the injury caused Nakonechnyy to withdraw from the 2023 Europe's Strongest Man contest. He was replaced by Paul Smith representing the United Kingdom.

On August 16, 2023, Nakonechnyy sustained severe injuries following a car accident. The severity of his injuries forced him to withdraw from his remaining competitions for the year, including the 2023 Shaw Classic, the 2023 World Deadlift Championships, and the 2023 Rogue Invitational.

In 2024, Nakonechnyy returned to training. He originally intended to return at the 2025 Europe's Strongest Man competition, but later withdrew due to injury. In 2025, he participated at the World Deadlift Championships only to end up with an injury during warm-ups.

== Personal records ==
Powerlifting:

- Squat (raw/ wraps) – 410 kg (904 lb)
- Bench press (raw) – 275 kg (606 lb)
- Deadlift (raw) – 390 kg (860 lb)

Strongman:

- Deadlift (with deadlift suit and figure 8 straps) – 454 kg (1,001 lb) (2022 Giants Live World Open)
- Axle Bar Deadlift with globes (for reps) (with deadlift suit and straps) – 350 kg (772 lb) x 11 reps (2022 Giants Live World Tour Finals) (World Record)
- Log press – 180 kg (397 lb) (2019 Ultimate Strongman Junior World Championships)
- Atlas Stones (light set) – 100–180 kg (220–397 lb) in 17.65 secs (2022 Giants Live World Open)
- Húsafell Stone replica sandbag – 181.5 kg (400 lb) for 63.50 metres (208 ft 4 in) (2022 Rogue Invitational)
- Nicol Stones (with Rogue replicas) – 114–139 kg (251–306 lb) for 15.91 metres (52 ft 2 in) (2022 Giants Live World Tour Finals)
- Weight over bar – 25.5 kg (56 lb) over 5.48 metres (18 ft 0 in) (2022 Rogue Invitational, record breakers)

Training:

- Deadlift (with deadlift suit and figure 8 straps) – 475 kg (1,047 lb)

== Personal life ==
When the Russian invasion of Ukraine started, Nakonechnyy stepped away from powerlifting and strongman shows to serve his country as a volunteer, delivering humanitarian aid. He has since returned to competition.
