= Torkel Ravndal =

Norwegian weightlifter

- Occupation: Strength athlete
- Known for: Breaking the deadlift world record
- Height: 1.95 m (6 ft 5 in)

Torkel Ravndal (October 14, 1936 – September 14, 2004) was a Norwegian weightlifter powerlifter, and strongman from Sandnes.

== Early life ==
Ravndal grew up in Figgjo in Sandnes Municipality, as the youngest of four siblings. His mother died when he was 3 years old. Both his father and grandfather were naturally tall and strong, and his grandfather was said to have set a record in lifting with the pinkie. Growing up, Ravndal was tall and thin, but was really fast and agile. He was interested in football and speedway racing, and with the intention of getting a better physique following his grandfather's remarks that he looks thin, started training with weights in 1961.

== Career ==
In 1962, Ravndal began training at the gym of "Samson" (Jan Harry Hasselquist) in Stavanger. Ravndal and Samson later toured together and held several strength shows around Norway. In 1963, Ravndal moved to Denmark and lived there for 5 years while working as an instructor at a health club. In 1965 he won his first national championship gold medal in powerlifting and had already set the Nordic record in the deadlift of 281 kg (619 lb). He also proceeded to break the national bench press record.

During the 1969 NBA Norwegian Powerlifting Championships held in Blindernhallen, Oslo, he broke the deadlift world record held by the American Don Cundy with a lift of 357.5 kg (788 lb). In this meet, he also bench pressed 192.5 kg (424 lb) for a new national record, and also squatted 200 kg (441 lb) for a raw total of 750 kg (1,653 lb).

In May 1970, Ravndal and Cundy had a famous duel for the deadlift world record where Cundy took the record to 365 kg (805 lb) only to be beaten by Ravndal with 367.5 kg (810 lb). Ravndal extended his world record to 375 kg (827 lb) in the same year and also claimed to have done 402.5 kg (887 lb) in 1976 during training. He was also known for his one-handed deadlifting.

Throughout the 70s, Ravndal embarked on an extensive strongman show tour sometimes collaborating with Arve Opsahl which attracted many people. Some of his famous acts included driving a seven-inch nail through a three-inch plank with his bare fist, bending cast iron bars with bare hands while holding them from his teeth, bending horseshoes, and holding up two small planes trying to move in the opposite directions with just his arms.

In 1973, Ravndal wrapped an iron chain around, straddled, and hip-lifted the legendary Sterke Nils Stone weighing 570 kg (1,257 lb) affiliated with the 18th century legend of Nils Olavsson Langedal of Seljord Municipality.

Once while entertaining with his strongman show, a woman was involved in a car accident nearby, and Ravndal lifted the car off her (enough for other helpers to pull her away). In the process he suffered injuries to his hands as a result of the car's metal bumper cutting into them.

He continued his feats of strengths well into the 80s and even participated in famous televised strongman competitions such as Europe's Strongest Man even at the age of 48.

In 1999, Norwegian pop rock band DeLillos made a song in honour of Ravndal which featured in their album Kast alle papirene.

Ravndal had to stop performing in 2000 due to asthma, and died in 2004.
