= Asko Karu =

Estonian powerlifter (born 1992)

Personal information
- Nationality: (Estonia) Estonian
- Born: 1992 (age 33–34) Estonia

Sport
- Sport: Powerlifting
- Event: Deadlift

Asko Karu (born 1992) is an Estonian powerlifter. He is known for his deadlifting prowess.

== Career ==
Karu began competing in powerlifting in 2017, focusing on deadlift-only meets in the super heavyweight division (+140 kg). He won five competitions which spanned across Finland and Russia with a best raw deadlift of 402.5 kg (887 lb) at 2019 FPO Tatu Avola Memorial meet.

From 2021 onwards, Karu claimed some of the heaviest suitless deadlifts in history in training including a pull of 482 kg (1,063 lb). As a result, he was invited to the Giants Live World Deadlift Championships in 2021, but he withdrew himself and didn't take part.

== Personal records ==
During competitions:

- Deadlift (raw) – 402.5 kg (887 lb) (2019 FPO Tatu Avola Memorial)

During training:

- Deadlift (raw with straps) – 482 kg (1,063 lb)
- Deadlift (raw with straps) for reps – 462 kg (1,019 lb) x 2 reps
- Squat (raw with sleeves) for reps – 350 kg (772 lb) x 2 reps

== See also ==
- List of people who have broken the 1000lb barrier in the deadlift
