= Asko (name) =

Estonian and Finnish male given name

- Gender: Male
- Languages: Finnish, Estonian
- Name day: 6 September (Finland); 11 July (Estonia)

Origin
- Region of origin: Finland, Estonia

Asko is a male given name common in Finland and Estonia. The nameday is 6 September. The first Asko was baptised in 1901, and as of 2009 there were more than 8000 people with this name in Finland.

Notable people with the name include:

- Asko Esna (born 1986), Estonian volleyball player
- Asko Jussila (born 1963), Finnish football manager
- Asko Karu (born 1992), Estonian powerlifter and strongman competitor
- Asko Kase (born 1979), Estonian film director
- Asko Künnap (born 1971), Estonian poet, artist, graphic designer and marketer
- Asko Paade (born 1984), Estonian basketball player
- Asko Parpola (born 1941), Finnish Indologist and Sindhologist
- Asko Peltoniemi (born 1963), Finnish pole vaulter
- Asko Sahlberg (born 1964), Finnish novelist
- Asko Sarkola (born 1945), Finnish actor and theatre manager
