= Askos =

Askos may refer to:

- Askos, Sochos, a place in Greece
- Askos (Zakynthos), Greece, a place
- Askos (pottery vessel), a type of ancient Greek pottery vessel

== See also ==
- Asko (disambiguation)
