= Ivan Makarov (strongman) =

Ukrainian strongman

Personal information
- Nationality: Ukraine
- Born: 28 June 1991 (age 35)
- Occupation: Strongman
- Height: 5 ft 11.5 in (1.82 m)
- Weight: 153 kg (337 lb)
Medal record
Strongman
Representing Russia Ukraine Georgia
Strongman Champions League
5th	2019 SCL Russia
10th	2019 SCL World Record Breakers
Giants Live
10th	2021 Giants Live World Open
10th	2022 Giants Live World Open
Siberian Power Show
7th	2019 Siberian Power Show
10th	2022 Siberian Power Show
Marijampolė International
6th	2018 Marijampolė International

Ivan Makarov (born 28 June 1991) is a Ukrainian-born Russian and Georgian Strongman who specialises in the deadlift. He is often regarded as one of the best deadlifters in the world.

== Early life and career ==
Born in Donetsk, Ukraine, Makarov suffered from kidney issues during his childhood but managed to defy doctor's predictions and started lifting heavy weights by the age of sixteen. After powerlifting and performing as a circus strongman, Makarov entered 2016 Strongman Team Open Challenge.

In 2017 Makarov was invited to the Strongman Champions League and rose to prominence through more international competitions such as Siberian Power Show, Giants Live, Marijampolė International and Central European Strongman Cup.

=== Deadlift ===
Makarov is a two time Giants Live World Deadlift Champion winning outright in 2021 and sharing it in 2024, as well as Eisenhart Deadlift Champion in 2022. He is also the only person to have held three national deadlift records having represented three countries. He broke the Russian record with 470 kg (1,036 lb) at 2019 Geraklion Record Breakers, Ukrainian record with 475 kg (1,047 lb) at 2021 World Deadlift Championships and Georgian record with 454 kg (1,001 lb) at 2022 World Deadlift Championships.

Makarov has deadlifted 1,000 lb or more the second highest number of times only behind Hafþór Júlíus Björnsson. He attempted to break the all-time deadlift world record multiple times (once when it was held by former record holder Eddie Hall in 2019 and four more times when it was held by the current record holder Björnsson between 2020 and 2024) but was not successful in any of the attempts.

Makarov's best deadlift of 483 kg (1,065 lb) achieved at the 2022 Eisenhart Black Deadlift Championships was the third heaviest lift at its time after Björnsson and Hall, and to this date remains the sixth heaviest after Björnsson (3 times), Hall, and Peiman Maheripour.

== Personal records ==
During competitions:

- Equipped Deadlift (with straps) – 483 kg (1,065 lb) (2022 Eisenhart Black Deadlift Championships)

→ Makarov's next best lifts include 480 kg (1,058 lb) at 2021 WRPF World Championships, 475 kg (1,047 lb) at 2021 World Deadlift Championships and 470 kg (1,036 lb) each at 2019 Geraklion Record Breakers and 2024 World Deadlift Championships.

- Raw Deadlift – 405 kg (893 lb) (2017 WRPF Pro World Championships)
- Log press – 190 kg (419 lb)
- Axle press – 150 kg (331 lb) x 4 reps

During training:

- Equipped Deadlift (with straps) – 490 kg (1,080 lb)
- Barbell strict press – 205 kg (452 lb)
