= Siberian Power Show =

International strongman competition

Tournament information
- Location: Krasnoyarsk, Russia
- Month played: April
- Established: 2017
- Format: Multi-event competition

Current champion
- (Canada) James Jeffers (2026)

Siberian Power Show is an annual international Strongman competition organized by sports promoters Matt Rhodes and Denis Kiyutsin, held in every April in Krasnoyarsk, Russia with the participation of top strongman athletes in the world.

The roots of the competition goes back to 2016 where it was initiated as a sporting weekend consisting of bodybuilding, armwrestling, mixed martial arts and slapfighting. In 2017, Strongman was introduced.

== Championship results ==
| Year | Champion | Runner-up | 3rd place | Location |
|---|---|---|---|---|
| 2017 | (Ukraine) Serhiy Romanchuk | (Russia) Valery Savin | (Russia) Evgeny Markov | Krasnoyarsk, Russia |
| 2018 | (Russia) Evgeny Markov | (Russia) Valery Savin | (Russia) Alexander Kuzmin | Krasnoyarsk, Russia |
| 2019 | (Russia) Dmitrii Skosyrskii | (Belarus) Ruslan Bagirov | (Russia) Alexander Kuzmin | Krasnoyarsk, Russia |
| 2020 | (Russia) Petr Martynenko | (Russia) Alexander Zinets | (Russia) Alexander Kuzmin | Krasnoyarsk, Russia |
| 2021 | (Georgia (country)) Konstantine Janashia | (Russia) Evgeny Markov | (United States) Wesley Claborn | Krasnoyarsk, Russia |
| 2022 | (Russia) Dmitrii Skosyrskii | (Russia) Ramil Ramazanov | (Russia) Vladimir Bulgakov | Krasnoyarsk, Russia |
| 2023 | (Russia) Dmitrii Skosyrskii | (Russia) David Shamey | (Iran) Peiman Maheripourehir | Krasnoyarsk, Russia |
| 2024 | (Russia) David Shamey | (Russia) Evgeny Markov | (Iran) Reza Gheitasi | Krasnoyarsk, Russia |
| 2025 | (Poland) Mateusz Kieliszkowski | (Iceland) Hafþór Júlíus Björnsson | (Russia) David Shamey | Krasnoyarsk, Russia |
| 2026 | (Canada) James Jeffers | (Poland) Dawid Pakulski | (Russia) Evgeny Konovalov | Krasnoyarsk, Russia |
