= Sumo deadlift =

Barbell deadlift variation

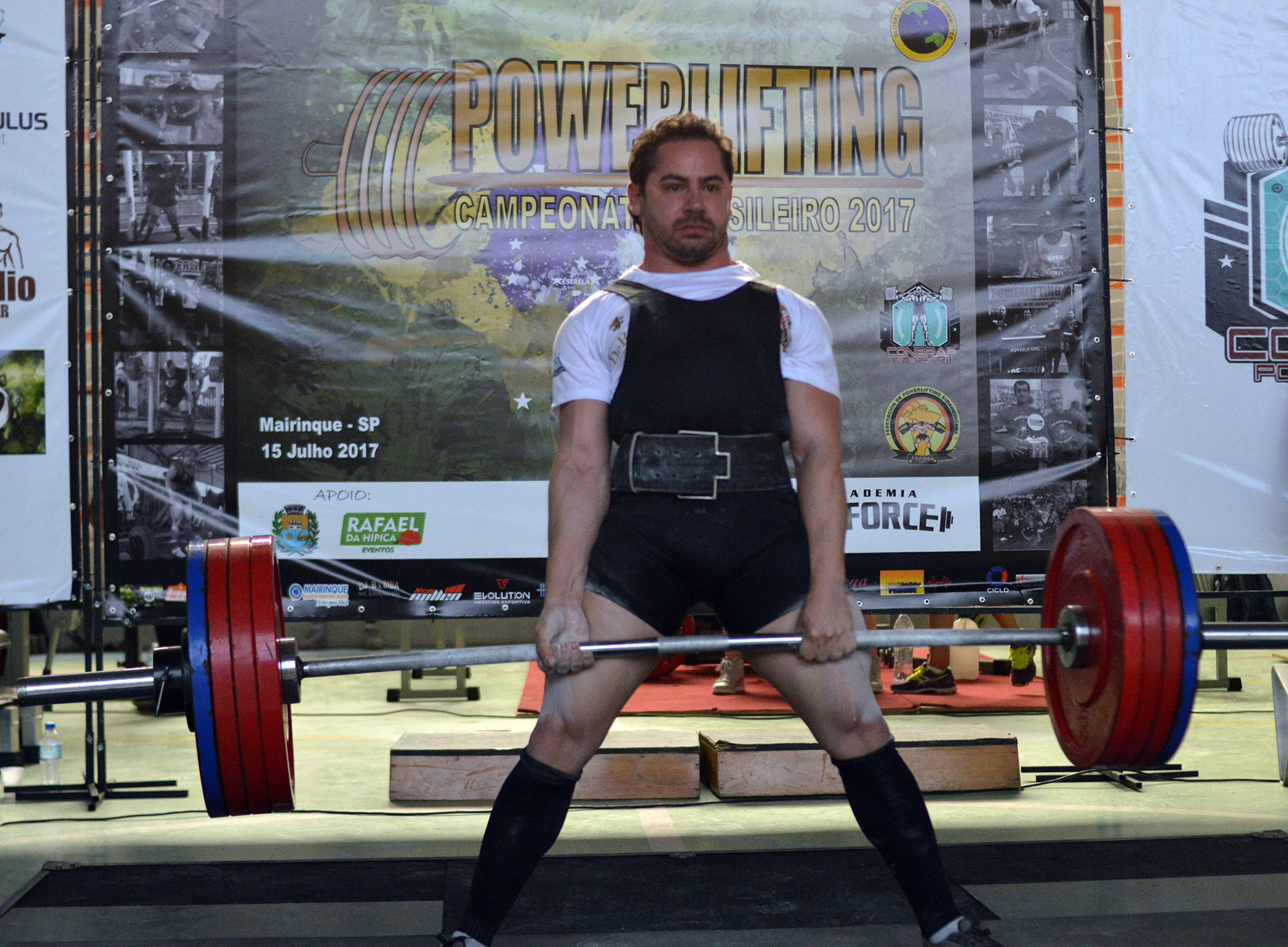
The wide stance of a sumo deadlift

The sumo deadlift is a variation of the barbell deadlift often adopted by powerlifters. When performing a sumo deadlift, the lifter adopts a wide stance, and grips the bar between the legs.

== Features ==
The difference between a sumo deadlift and a conventional one lies in the setup of the lifter's feet and hands. When the bar is gripped with the lifter's hands inside their legs, the form is considered "sumo". Traditionally, hip stance is far wider in sumo deadlifts, and toes are pointed slightly outwards.

The sumo deadlift may be advantageous to people with exceptional hip mobility, a long torso, or short arms, as it allows the hips to start closer to the bar, with the torso in a more upright position. Another advantage of the sumo deadlift is decreased shearing force on the lumbar spine when compared to the conventional deadlift. Other benefits of the sumo deadlift include: Strengthening the quadriceps, glutes, hamstrings, and other muscles of the posterior chain. In addition to building strength and muscle mass, the sumo deadlift can be used as a rehabilitation exercise to overcome back injury.

== Technique ==
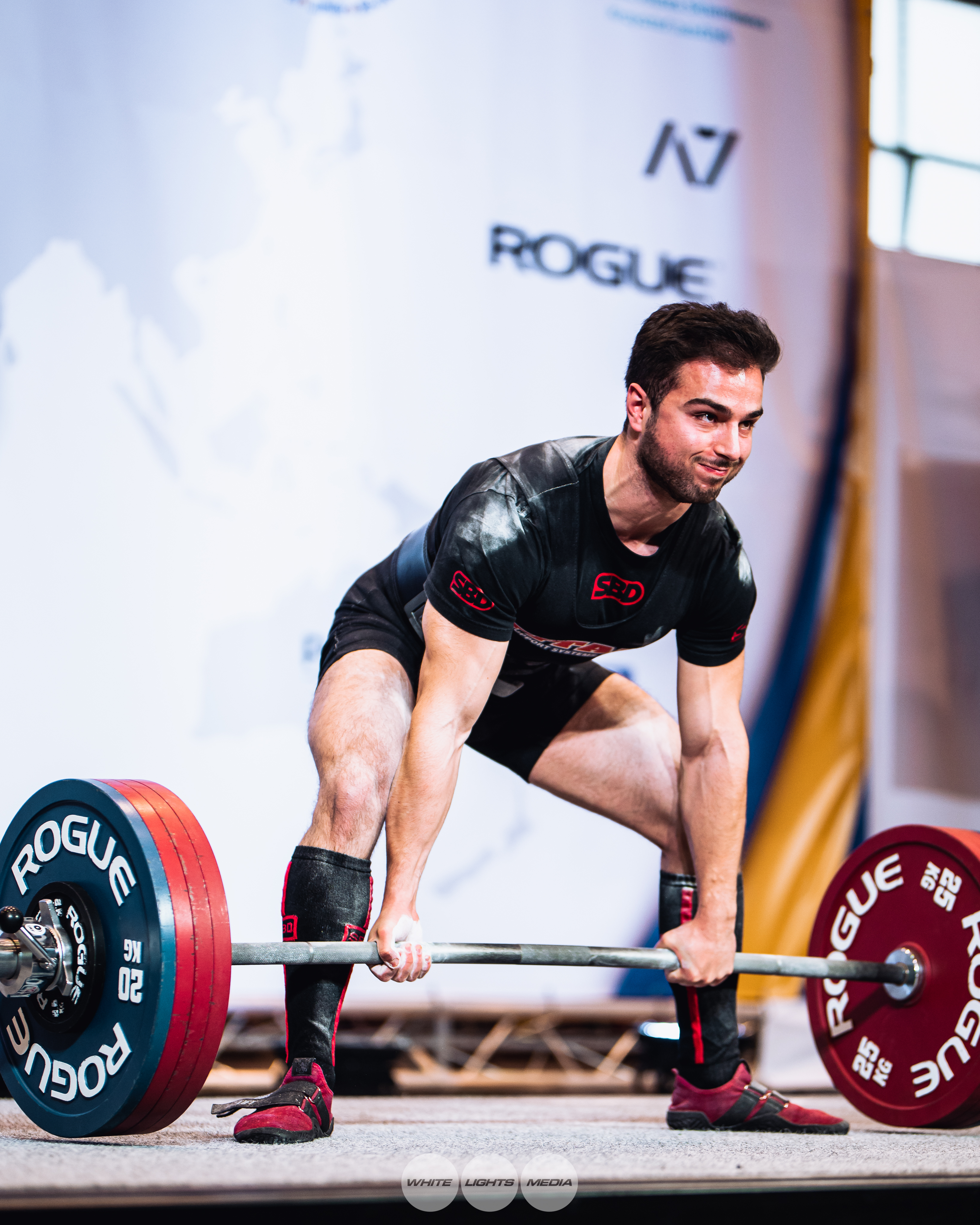
Hands grip the bar between the legs, toes point outwards at an angle

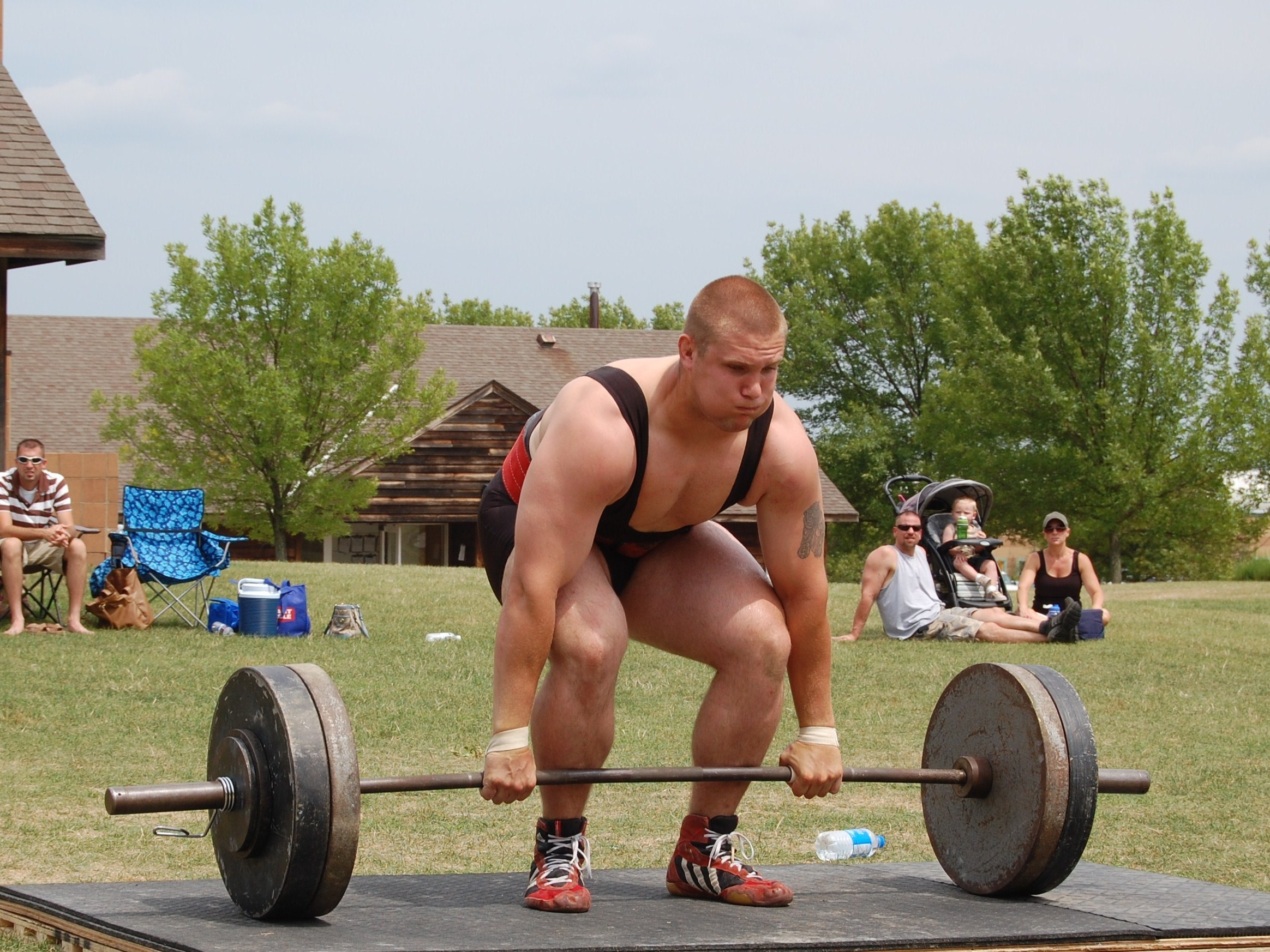
In conventional deadlift, hands are placed outside the legs

In general, foot placement in sumo deadlift is about twice shoulder width, lining up the shins with the rings on the barbell. Toes are pointed outwards around forty-five degrees, keeping the shin vertical and knees behind the bar. The hips are raised to position the thighs slightly above parallel to the floor. The lumbar spine maintains a neutral position with slight extension and the torso kept as upright as possible. Both hands grip the bar shoulder width apart with the shoulders positioned just in front of the bar. Lifters may use double overhand, hook or mixed grips, but alternate grip or hook grip is recommended for heavier loads.

Before executing the movement, the muscles of the quadriceps, glutes, and latissimus dorsi should be contracted and the scapula depressed to create tension and stability. To begin the movement, the knees, hips, and back should extend simultaneously. As the bar passes the knees, the glutes contract further, driving the hips forward and keeping the bar in contact with the thighs. These motions take place simultaneously to avoid rounding of the spine. Lock out is achieved when the knees, hips, and back are extended fully. Hyperextension of the spine should be avoided.

Lifters may choose to pull the slack out of the bar before attempting to lift it off of the ground. This is achieved by lowering down to the bar in the position described above, but rather than immediately beginning to pull off the ground, the lifter raises their hips up while building tension. They then quickly lower back down and follow the same movement pattern while attempting to fully lock out the lift.
