= Rauno Heinla =

Estonian strongman

Personal information
- Born: 7 June 1982 (age 44) Tartu, then part of Estonian SSR, Soviet Union
- Occupation: Strongman
- Height: 6 ft 0 in (1.83 m)
- Weight: 129–145 kg (284–320 lb)
- Children: 1
Medal record
Representing Estonia
World's Strongest Man
Qualified	2011 World's Strongest Man
Qualified	2023 World's Strongest Man
Qualified	2024 World's Strongest Man
Arnold Strongman Classic
8th	2018 Arnold Strongman Classic
6th	2019 Arnold Strongman Classic
World's Ultimate Strongman
11th	2020 World's Ultimate Strongman
9th	2021 World's Ultimate Strongman
Europe's Strongest Man
10th	2015 Europe's Strongest Man
4th	2021 Europe's Strongest Man
12th	2022 Europe's Strongest Man
7th	2024 Europe's Strongest Man
7th	2025 Europe's Strongest Man
Giants Live
3rd	2011 Finland
5th	2014 Norway
10th	2019 Wembley
8th	2021 World Open
6th	2022 World Open
6th	2022 World Tour Finals
10th	2023 World Open
Strongman Champions League
4th	2011 SCL Lapland
8th	2011 SCL Latvia
4th	2012 SCL Lapland
3rd	2014 SCL Finland
6th	2014 SCL Poland
1st	2014 SCL Savickas Classic
1st	2014 SCL Estonia
3rd	2015 SCL Finland
1st	2014 SCL Savickas Classic
Arnold Pro Strongman World Series
5th	2016 Africa
5th	2016 Asia
6th	2016 Europe
4th	2017 Australia
1st	2017 South America
3rd	2017 Africa
9th	2017 Forts de Warwick
1st	2018 Australia
3rd	2018 South America
4th	2018 Africa
8th	2018 Forts de Warwick
11th	2018 Europe
3rd	2019 USA
3rd	2019 Australia
3rd	2019 South America
9th	2019 Africa
10th	2019 Europe
4th	2020 USA
3rd	2022 UK
8th	2024 UK
Força Bruta
2nd	2021 Força Bruta
2nd	2022 Força Bruta

Rauno Heinla (born 7 June 1982) is an Estonian professional strongman competitor. He is a specialist in the deadlift events and is regarded as one of the best deadlifters in the world.

== Strongman career ==
Born in Tartu, Estonia, Rauno started his Strongman career in 2000 in the local strongman competition Kõrveküla rammumees. He won his first national title by winning the Estonia's Strongest Man competition in 2008. He's the only Estonian to win this title 6 times following in the footsteps of Tarmo Mitt and Andrus Murumets (who both won 5 times each). For most of his career, Rauno trained with fellow Estonian Strongman Lauri Nämi.

Rauno identifies heavy stones and deadlift for reps as his favourite events, and also recognizes that he needs to improve his truck pulls and super yokes.

In his career spanning 22 years, Rauno has competed in over 45 international competitions and 8 single event contests. On September 13, 2020, Rauno broke the 400 kg (882 lb) Deadlift (standard bar) for repetitions world record with 6 reps under World's Ultimate Strongman Feats of Strength series. During 2022 World Deadlift Championships, he deadlifted 476 kg (1,049 lb) which makes him the sixth heaviest deadlifter of all time in competition and to this date it stands as the heaviest deadlift performed by someone over 40 years of age. Rauno has deadlifted 1,000 lb or more the third highest number of times behind Hafþór Júlíus Björnsson and Ivan Makarov. He has done it both in conventional and sumo variations.

On December 3, 2023, Rauno participated in the Official Strongman Games 40s class, and won his first Masters title, adding to 2nd-place finish he earned in 2022.

== Personal records ==
- Deadlift (with suit and straps) – 476 kg (1,049 lb) (2022 Giants Live World Open) (Masters World Record)

→ Rauno has also done a Sumo deadlift of 475 kg (1,047 lb) (with suit and straps) during training.

- Elephant bar Deadlift (Raw w/ straps) – 431.5 kg (951 lb) (2019 Arnold Strongman Classic)
- Deadlift (for reps) (with suit and straps) – 400 kg (882 lb) x 6 reps (World's Ultimate Strongman) (Feats of Strength series, 2020) (former world record)

→ Rauno has also done this twice more during training.

- Axle bar Deadlift with globes (for reps) (with suit and straps) – 360 kg (794 lb) x 9 reps (2021 Europe's Strongest Man) (World Record)
- Stiff bar Deadlift (Raw w/ straps) (for reps) – 350 kg (772 lb) x 9 reps (2024 Arnold UK)
- Silver Dollar Deadlift (18 inches from the floor) – 580 kg (1,279 lb) (World Record)
- Squat – 360 kg (794 lb) Raw, 320 kg (705 lb) x 10 reps
- Bench press – 240 kg (529 lb) Raw
- Log press – 195 kg (430 lb), 170 kg (375 lb) x 4 reps
- Axle press – 181.5 kg (400 lb) x 2 reps
- Block press – 140 kg (309 lb) (2014 Savickas Classic)
- Max Atlas stone – 220 kg (485 lb) as a part of a 5 stone run (2017 Arnold Australia)
- Atlas Stones – 6 stone set (120–215 kg (265–474 lb)) in 32.98 seconds (2014 SCL Estonia) (World Record)
- Atlas Stones – 5 stone set (100–180 kg (220–397 lb)) in 21.20 seconds (2021 Europe's Strongest Man)
- Atlas Stone over bar – 185 kg (408 lb) x 8 reps over a 4 ft 3 in (51 in) bar (2014 SCL Savickas Classic) (World Record)
- Húsafell Stone – 186 kg (410 lb) for 58.90 metres (193 ft 3 in) (2019 Arnold Strongman Classic)
- Bankier sack carry – 181.5 kg (400 lb) for 46.02 metres (151 ft 0 in) (2019 Arnold USA) (Joint-World Record)
- Arm over arm sled pull – 600 kg (1,323 lb) for 25m course in 12.67 seconds (2019 Arnold South America) (World Record)
