= Raul Flores (strongman) =

Mexican strongman (born 2000)

Raul Abraham Flores Castro
Personal information
- Nickname: Tayzon
- Nationality: (Mexico) Mexican
- Born: May 9, 2000 (age 26) Ciudad Victoria, Tamaulipas, Mexico
- Occupation: Strongman
- Height: 5 ft 10 in (178 cm)
- Weight: 363 lb (165 kg)
Medal record
Strongman
Representing Mexico
World Deadlift Championships
4th	2025 World Deadlift Championships
1st	2026 World Deadlift Championships
Giants Live
11th	2026 Giants Live Strongman Open
Arnold Amateur strongman
8th	2025 Arnold Strongman Pro/Am
29th	2026 Arnold Strongman Pro/Am

Raul Flores (born May 9, 2000) is a Mexican strongman competitor and the all-time deadlift world record holder at 511 kg (1,127 lb).

== Early life and career ==
Originally from Ciudad Victoria, Tamaulipas, Flores began his powerlifting career in 2020 at the USPA North Louisiana Shootout in the junior category.

Flores began competing in strongman in 2021 and quickly rose to prominence as a deadlift specialist after winning Mike Strongman regional championship back-to-back in 2023 and 2024.

In 2025, Flores became the first Mexican to qualify for the finals of the Arnold Strongman Pro/Am, finishing in the top 5. This result earned him an invitation to the 2025 Giants Live World Deadlift Championships where he deadlifted 453.5 kg (1,000 lb) and secured joint-fourth place in a stacked line up which also included the former all-time deadlift world record holder Hafþór Júlíus Björnsson.

In 2026, Flores won the Giants Live World Deadlift Championships with a new all-time deadlift world record of 511 kg (1,127 lb) making him the third man in history to lift 500 kg (1,102 lb) or more in a strongman competition.

== Personal records ==
During competitions:

- Equipped Deadlift (with straps) – 511 kg (1,127 lb) (2026 World Deadlift Championship) (World record)
- Log Lift – 162 kg (357 lb) (2025 Arnold Strongman Pro/Am)

During training:

- Equipped Deadlift (with straps) – 504.04 kg (1,111 lb)
- Equipped Deadlift for reps (with straps) - 482.5 kg (1,064 lb) x 2 and 470 kg (1,036 lb) x 3

== See also ==
- List of people who have broken the 1000lb barrier in the deadlift
