= Krzysztof Wierzbicki =

Polish powerlifter (born 1990)

Personal information
- Born: 5 June 1990 (age 36) Mikołów, Poland
- Weight: 109.2 kg (241 lb)

Sport
- Sport: Powerlifting

Achievements and titles
- Personal bests: Squat: 340 kg (2025); Bench Press: 207.5 kg (2025); Deadlift: 456 kg (2025); Total: 1,003.5 kg (2025)
Medal record
Representing Poland
Classic Men's World Championships
Gold medal – first place	2012 Stockholm	93 kg
Gold medal – first place	2013 Suzdal	93 kg
Gold medal – first place	2014 Johannesburg	93 kg
Gold medal – first place	2015 Salo	93 kg
Gold medal – first place	2017 Minsk	105 kg
Bronze medal – third place	2018 Calgary	105 kg
Classic Men's European Championships
Gold medal – first place	2017 Thisted	105 kg
Gold medal – first place	2018 Kaunas	105 kg

Krzysztof Wierzbicki (born 5 June 1990) is a Polish powerlifter. Wierzbicki has won 5 gold medals at the World Classic Championships and 2 gold medals at the European Classic (raw) Championships in the IPF. Wierzbicki has also took part in the World Games in 2017, where he finished in 5th place.

== Career ==
Wierzbicki began competing in 2007. In March 2017, Krzysztof deadlifted 390 kg at the European Classic Powerlifting Championship. Later that year, he took part at the 2017 World Games, where he deadlifted 420 kg for an open equipped world record in the 120 kg weight class, despite weighing 105.07 kg. In 2020, Wierzbicki deadlifted 400 kg at 97.1 kg at the 2020 Three Nations Powerlifting Open 2020 in Bayreuth, Germany.

In 2023 he lifted the heaviest deadlift ever caught on camera. During training session he deadlifted 502.5 kg. In 2024, he lifted even heavier deadlift at 510 kg, despite being injured previously.
