= Andy Bolton =

British strength athlete

- Born: Andrew Bolton; 22 January 1970 (age 56); Dewsbury, Yorkshire
- Occupations: Powerlifting, Strongman
- Known for: First man ever to deadlift 1,000 lb.
- Height: 6 ft 0 in (1.83 m)

Competition record

Powerlifting

Representing England

WPC World Powerlifting Championships
1st	2000	140kg
1st	2001	+140kg
1st	2008	+140kg

Strongman

Representing England

Arnold Strongman Classic
5th	2002	

UK Strongman Docklands Challenge
2nd	1999	

Andrew Bolton (born 22 January 1970) is an English powerlifter and strongman from Dewsbury, Yorkshire. In 2006, he became the first man to deadlift 1,000 lb.

== Career ==
Bolton won his first powerlifting competition in 1991 when he was twenty-one years of age, at a local powerlifting event called the BAWLA Yorkshire Junior Championships. He has since competed in the WPO/WPC in multi ply and single ply categories. He was the former world record holder of the WPO equipped (multi-ply) total with 1,273 kg (2,806 lb). Bolton also held the WPO equipped (multi-ply) squat world record with 550.5 kg (1,214 lb) and equipped deadlift world record with 457.5 kg (1,009 lb).

Bolton also competed in strongman competition four times: in 1994 World Muscle Power Classic where he placed eighth, 1995 Britain's Strongest Man where he placed fifth, 1999 UK Strongman Docklands Challenge where he placed second, and the 2002 Arnold Strongman Classic where he placed fifth.

=== Deadlift ===
Bolton is renowned for breaking the equipped deadlift world record in powerlifting a total of six times from 2003 to 2009, and for his deadlift duel with the Icelander Benedikt Magnússon who broke his world records three times, doing them raw.

Bolton broke the deadlift word record for the first time in 2003 WPO finals in Columbus, Ohio when he surpassed Garry Frank's 422.5 kg (931 lb) with 423 kg (933 lb). Then he took the record to 425 kg (937 lb) at GPC-GB British Championships in Wales.

During 2005 WPC WPO European Semi Finals held in Helsinki, Magnússon broke Bolton's record for the first time with 426 kg (939 lb), however Bolton managed to reclaim it with 427.5 kg (942 lb) only until Magnússon replied with a massive 440 kg (970 lb) in this third attempt to claim the world record for the second time.

In 2006 at the Arnold Strongman Classic, Bolton broke the record for the fourth time with 440.5 kg (971 lb) and after Magnússon suffered an injury, capitalized and became the first man to reach four-figures with 455 kg (1,003 lb) at 2006 WPO semifinals in Lake George, New York. and broke the record for the sixth and final time, taking it to 457.5 kg (1,009 lb) at 2009 BPC South East Championships in Eton, Berkshire.

Bolton did his first raw meet at the age of 40, in 2010 at Elizabethtown High School at "The Night of the Living Dead" deadlift only competition where he deadlifted 437.5 kg (965 lb) raw in only a pair of pants and a striking pair of socks.

Bolton's all time world record stood until 2011 when Magnússon returned from the injury and deadlifted 460.5 kg (1,015 lb) raw.

In 2012, Bolton published a deadlift training book Deadlift Dynamite in collaboration with Pavel Tsatsouline.

== Personal records ==
Powerlifting:
Equipped (multi ply):

- Squat – 550.5 kg (1,214 lb) (2007 WPC WPO Finals) (former world record)
- Bench press – 330 kg (728 lb) (2010 FPO Bullfarm Powerlifting Championships)
- Deadlift – 457.5 kg (1,009 lb) (2009 BPC South East Qualifier and Novice Bash) (former world record)
- Total – 1,273 kg (2,806 lb) (550.5 + 305 + 417.5 kg (1,214 + 672 + 920 lb)) (2007 WPC WPO Finals) (former world record)

Equipped (single ply):

- Squat – 380 kg (838 lb) (1992 WPC World Championships)
- Bench press – 222.5 kg (491 lb) (1999 WPA British Powerlifting Championships)
- Total – 982.5 kg (2,166 lb) (370 + 222.5 + 390 kg (816 + 491 + 860 lb)) (1999 WPA British Powerlifting Championships)

Raw:

- Deadlift – 437.5 kg (965 lb) (2010 USA-UA Night of the Living Deadlift)

Strongman:

- Deadlift – 401 kg (884 lb) x 3 reps (oil filled plates) (2002 Arnold Strongman Classic)
- Timber carry (raw grip) – 370 kg (816 lb) for 40 ft in 19.20 seconds (2002 Arnold Strongman Classic)
