= Peiman Maheripour =

Iranian Strongman and powerlifter (born 1988)

Personal information
- Born: 5 October 1987 (age 38) Ardabil, Iran
- Occupation: Strongman
- Height: 1.88 m (6 ft 2 in)
Medal record
Strongman
Representing Iran
World's Strongest Man
Qualified	2017 World's Strongest Man
Qualified	2018 World's Strongest Man
Siberian Power Show
3rd	2023 Siberian Power Show
Iran's Strongest Man
2nd	2018 Iran's Strongest Man

Peiman Maheripour (Persian: پیمان ماهری‌پور) (born 15 October 1987) is an Iranian Strongman and powerlifter.

== Strongman career ==
Maheripour is the third Iranian (after Soltaan Bathaiee in 2005 and Reza Gharaei in 2006) who got selected for the World's Strongest Man competition which he managed twice.

In 2017 World's Strongest Man, he competed in heat 5 together with Zydrunas Savickas, Nick Best, Terry Hollands, Bryan Benzel and Oluwatofunmi Fadesire. He secured third in his group, but it was not sufficient to reach the finals.

In 2018 World's Strongest Man, he competed in heat 1 together with the champion Hafþór Júlíus Björnsson, Matjaz Belsak, Marius Lalas, Laurence Shahlaei and Rob Kearney. He managed fifth in his group which was again not sufficient to reach the finals.

Maheripour won second place in 2018 Iran's Strongest Man behind Mohammad Ezzatpour and third place in 2023 Siberian Power Show behind Dmitrii Skosyrskii and David Shamey. Holder of the Asian deadlift record with 485 kg (1,069 lb), he is widely regarded for his prowess in deadlifting and for having the fifth heaviest deadlift ever, after Hafþór Júlíus Björnsson (3 times) and Eddie Hall.

== Personal records ==
During competitions:

- Equipped Deadlift (with straps) – 485 kg (1,069 lb) (2024 Iran Strongest Men & Women's Deadlift Championships)

→ Maheripour's next best lifts include 481 kg (1,060 lb) and 477.5 kg (1,053 lb) at 2021 WRPF World Championships, Moscow.

- Manhood Stone (Max Atlas Stone) – 236 kg (520 lb) over 4 ft bar (2023 Siberian Power Show)

During training:

- Equipped Deadlift (with straps) – 492 kg (1,085 lb)
