= Eddie: Strongman =

2015 British documentary film

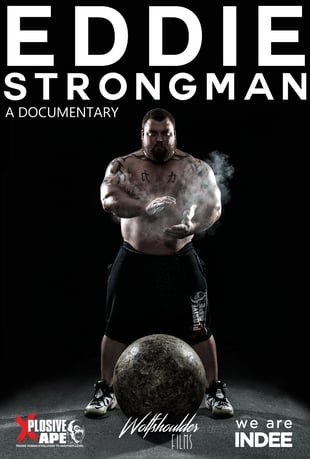
- Poster
- Directed by: Matt Bell
- Produced by: Matt Bell; Tom Swanston; Colin Bryce; Scott Jessop; Clint Gaskin
- Starring: Eddie Hall
- Cinematography: Matt Bell; Jason Hall
- Edited by: Matt Bell; Tom Bober
- Music by: Nick Jakins; Mike Thornton
- Release date: 8 August 2015
- Country: United Kingdom
- Language: English

Eddie: Strongman is a 2015 British documentary film directed by Matt Bell. It follows the life of English strongman Eddie Hall as he strives to become the World's Strongest Man, which he later achieved in 2017. The film provides a unique insight into the extreme lifestyle of an international strongman and the sacrifices he must make to achieve his goals. It features appearances from Arnold Schwarzenegger, Brian Shaw, Žydrūnas Savickas, Hafþór Júlíus Björnsson, Benedikt Magnússon, Terry Hollands, and Geoff Capes.
