= Rob Hoey =

- Born: 28 April 1980 (age 46); England
- Occupations: Musician, writer, comedian

Rob Hoey (born 28 April 1980) is a musician, actor, writer and comedian and is best known for being the vocalist for his current band Limb and the guitarist / founder of the band Multi Purpose Chemical.

== Music ==
In early 2004 MPC's first recording of a 3-track demo CD, containing recordings of "Cult," "Death For Sale" and "Hate Magnet" (with a bonus track of their Cypress Hill-inspired song, "Hop Skip Jump"), earned the band a record deal with Liverpool's Honey Records. MPC went on to record a 4-track EP, "Cult EP", produced by Ace (Skunk Anansie), containing new recordings of "Hate Magnet", "Death For Sale", "Embrace" and "Cult", with their first music video of "Cult" that appeared on MTV2 Europe's 120 Minutes (UK TV series). The EP was released on 28 November 2005, by Honey Records.

In 2006, MPC recorded their album ...And Four More Ways To Fight. It was originally expected to be released in late 2006, but after being set back a number of times, it was finally released on 29 October 2007.

Before the release of the full-length album came their first official single, "Human", which appeared on MTV2 Europe's 120 Minutes (UK TV series) and is only available as an Internet download through iTunes and IndieStore.com. The 'zebra head' and animal images associated with "Human" will no longer be used but are heavily featured in the song's accompanying music video (based on Falling Down).

MPC played their final gig at Liverpool's Hub Festival on 24 May 2009.

Rob then formed The Death Trucks and took the role as guitarist and vocalist. They released one album "The Death trucks" (2010) and a self released single (2011)

At the end of 2011 Hoey joined the doom metal / sludge metal band Limb who released a demo through Witch Hunter Records in November 2012. They are now signed to New Heavy Sounds (records) who released their single 'Gift of the Sun' in early 2013, recorded and produced by Ross Halden at Ghost Town Studios.

The band recorded with Ross Halden again in November 2013 for their self titled debut album. The album was released in April 2014 with artwork by Richey Beckett.

Limb are currently on tour around Europe.

== Television / Comedy Career ==
Rob Hoey is also a writer and comic.

Hoey's television debut came in 1999 in the form of CITV's Chatter Happy Ponies which saw Rob playing "Bob" a farm hand.

He then attended Stratford Upon Avon college where he met comedy cohort Matt J Bell. They went on to perform comedy together and at the Edinburgh festival and have done so ever since with notable performances on Charlie Brookers Screenwipe.

He was also a regular member of 'The Jelly Moustache', a comedy troupe who wrote, produced and performed sketches for digital channel 'Shorts TV'.

As well as television, Rob Hoey and Matt J Bell performed their show "GCSE Drama" around London, previewing at the Etcetera Theatre in Camden in 2010.

In 2011 Hoey was also a part of David Walliams show Awfully Good on Channel 4 made by Objective Productions.

Alongside Reverend Obadiah Steppenwolfe III, Rob performed at Edinburgh Fringe Festival 2013 on the Gilded Balloon stage under a stage moniker 'Dr Huntington Jelicoe'; a role he has continued to play at the Edinburgh Festival in subsequent years.

In 2014, with longtime comedy partner Matt J Bell, Rob was featured in the pilot for BBC Three called 'Top Coppers'. Hoey & Bell play 'Peterson & McGockey' alongside a cast including John Kearns, Connor Mckenna (Foil Arms & Hog Sketch Troupe), Tom Bennett (actor), Mark Davison & Anna Chancellor (Among Others).

His first solo show; 'Facebook Sensation Rob Hoey presents: the Facebook Sensation Rob Hoey Variety Hour, with Facebook Sensation Rob Hoey', was previewed at the Etcetera Theatre in Camden before being performed in numerous venues around London throughout 2014/15.

== Discography ==
Multi Purpose Chemical

Release	Type	Year	Label
Cult	E.P	2005	Honey Records
Human	Single	2006	Honey Records
...And Four More Ways To Fight	Album	2007	Honey Records

The Death Trucks

Release	Type	Year	Label
The Death Trucks	Album	2010	Independent Release
1234 Attack	E.P	2011	Independent Release

Limb

Release	Type	Year	Label
Demo	E.P	2012	Witch Hunter Records
Gift of the Sun	Single	2013	New Heavy Sounds
Limb / Gurt	Split	2013	Witch Hunter Records
Limb (self titled)	Album	2014	New Heavy Sounds
Terminal	Album	2015	New Heavy Sounds
Saboteurs Of The Sun	Album	2018	New Heavy Sounds
