= 2016 Europe's Strongest Man =

Strongman competition held in England

Competition information
- Dates: 9 July 2016
- Venue: First Direct Arena
- Location: Leeds
- Country: United Kingdom
- Athletes participating: 10
- Nations participating: 6

Champion(s)
- (United Kingdom) Laurence Shahlaei

The 2016 Europe's Strongest Man was a strongman competition that took place in Leeds, England on 9 July 2016 at the First Direct Arena. This event was part of the 2016 Giants live tour.

Laurence Shahlaei won the competition defeating the defending champion Hafþór Björnsson.

== Participants ==
- Terry Hollands (UK)
- Marius Lalas (LTU)
- Laurence Shahlaei (UK)
- Hafþór Björnsson (ISL)
- Johannes Årsjö (SWE)
- Mark Felix (UK)
- Mateusz Kieliszkowski (POL)
- Adam Bishop (UK)
- Vytautas Lalas (LTU)
- Stefan Solvi Petursson (ISL)

== Results of events ==
=== Event 1: Max Deadlift ===
- Notes: A number of athletes were invited to take part in this event only and therefore they did not score points.

#	Athlete	Nation	Weight	Event Points	Overall Points
1	Hafþór Björnsson	Iceland	440 kilograms (970 lb)	10	10
2	Laurence Shahlaei	United Kingdom	420 kilograms (930 lb)	7.5	7.5
2	Terry Hollands	United Kingdom	420 kilograms (930 lb)	7.5	7.5
2	Mark Felix	United Kingdom	420 kilograms (930 lb)	7.5	7.5
2	Marius Lalas	Lithuania	420 kilograms (930 lb)	7.5	7.5
6	Johannes Arsjo	Sweden	400 kilograms (880 lb)	4	4
6	Dimitar Savatinov	Bulgaria	400 kilograms (880 lb)	4	4
6	Adam Bishop	United Kingdom	400 kilograms (880 lb)	4	4
9	Mateusz Kieliszkowski	Poland	N/A	0	0
9	Stefan Solvi Petursson	Iceland	N/A	0	0

Athlete	Nation	Weight
Eddie Hall	United Kingdom	500 kilograms (1,100 lb)
Benedikt Magnússon	Iceland	465 kilograms (1,025 lb)
Jerry Pritchett	United States	465 kilograms (1,025 lb)

=== Event 2: Frame Carry ===
- Weight: 440 kilograms (970 lb)
- Course Length: 30 metres (98 ft)

#	Athlete	Nation	Time	Event Points	Overall Points
1	Laurence Shahlaei	United Kingdom	10.10	10	17.5
2	Johannes Arsjo	Sweden	11.05	9	13
3	Marius Lalas (Note: Marius Lalas sustained an injury in this event and took no further part in the competition.)	Lithuania	11.08	8	15.5
4	Hafþór Björnsson	Iceland	11.17	7	17
5	Terry Hollands	United Kingdom	11.51	6	13.5
6	Mateusz Kieliszkowski	Poland	12.41	5	5
7	Dimitar Savatinov	Bulgaria	14.38	4	8
8	Mark Felix	United Kingdom	14.56	3	10.5
9	Stefan Solvi Petursson (Note: Stefan Solvi Petursson sustained an injury in this event and took no further part in the competition.)	Iceland	16.40	2	2
10	Adam Bishop	United Kingdom	18.48	1	5

=== Event 3: Log Lift ===
- Weight: 160 kilograms (350 lb) for as many repetitions as possible.
- Time Limit: 75 seconds

#	Athlete	Nation	Repetitions	Event Points	Overall Points
1	Mateusz Kieliszkowski	Poland	8	10	15
2	Johannes Arsjo	Sweden	5	8.5	21.5
2	Hafþór Björnsson	Iceland	5	8.5	25.5
4	Dimitar Savatinov	Bulgaria	4	7	15
5	Laurence Shahlaei	United Kingdom	3	5.5	23
5	Terry Hollands	United Kingdom	3	5.5	19
7	Adam Bishop	United Kingdom	1	4	9
8	Mark Felix	United Kingdom	0	0	10.5

=== Event 4: Car Walk ===
- Weight: 440 kilograms (970 lb)
- Course Length: 30 metres (98 ft)

#	Athlete	Nation	Time	Event Points	Overall Points
1	Laurence Shahlaei	United Kingdom	11.05	10	33
2	Mateusz Kieliszkowski	Poland	11.56	9	24
3	Johannes Arsjo	Sweden	13.12	8	29.5
4	Terry Hollands	United Kingdom	14.22	7	26
5	Mark Felix	United Kingdom	15.78	6	16.5
6	Dimitar Savatinov	Bulgaria	16.11	5	20
7	Adam Bishop	United Kingdom	18.12	4	13
8	Hafþór Björnsson	Iceland	18.44	3	28.5

=== Event 5: Atlas Stones ===
- Weight: 5 stone series ranging from 140–200 kilograms (310–440 lb).

#	Athlete	Nation	Time	Event Points	Overall Points
1	Hafþór Björnsson	Iceland	5 in 18.16	10	38.5
2	Johannes Arsjo	Sweden	5 in 28.13	9	38.5
3	Laurence Shahlaei	United Kingdom	5 in 30.80	8	41
4	Mateusz Kieliszkowski	Poland	5 in 32.10	7	31
5	Dimitar Savatinov	Bulgaria	5 in 42.17	6	26
6	Adam Bishop	United Kingdom	5 in 45.73	5	18
7	Mark Felix	United Kingdom	4 in 22.45	4	20.5
8	Terry Hollands	United Kingdom	3 in 22.34	3	29

== Final results ==
#	Athlete	Nation	Points
1st place, gold medalist(s)	Laurence Shahlaei	United Kingdom	41
2nd place, silver medalist(s)	Hafþór Björnsson	Iceland	38.5
2nd place, silver medalist(s)	Johannes Arsjo	Sweden	38.5
4	Mateusz Kieliszkowski	Poland	31
5	Terry Hollands	United Kingdom	29
6	Dimitar Savatinov	Bulgaria	26
7	Mark Felix	United Kingdom	20.5
8	Adam Bishop	United Kingdom	18
9	Marius Lalas	Lithuania	15.5
10	Stefan Solvi Petursson	Iceland	2

Preceded by 2015 Europe's Strongest Man	Europe's Strongest Man	Succeeded by 2017 Europe's Strongest Man
