= Jerry Pritchett =

American strongman

Personal information
- Nickname: Iron Outlaw
- Nationality: American
- Born: 18 December 1980 (age 45) Phoenix, Arizona
- Occupations: Strongman and Powerlifter
- Height: 6 ft 4 in (1.93 m)
- Weight: 160–165 kg (353–364 lb)
- Spouse: Kasey Pritchett
- Children: 2
Medal record
Strongman
Representing United States
World's Strongest Man
| Qualified | 2012 World's Strongest Man |
| Qualified | 2013 World's Strongest Man |
| 9th | 2014 World's Strongest Man |
| 10th | 2015 World's Strongest Man |
| 4th | 2020 World's Strongest Man |
| Qualified | 2021 World's Strongest Man |
Arnold Strongman Classic
| 7th | 2013 Arnold Strongman Classic |
| 6th | 2014 Arnold Strongman Classic |
| 8th | 2015 Arnold Strongman Classic |
| 6th | 2016 Arnold Strongman Classic |
| 3rd | 2017 Arnold Strongman Classic |
| 6th | 2018 Arnold Strongman Classic |
| 9th | 2019 Arnold Strongman Classic |
| 8th | 2020 Arnold Strongman Classic |
Arnold Pro Strongman World Series
| 2nd | 2017 South America |
| 3rd | 2017 Europe |
| 3rd | 2018 Africa |
| 3rd | 2019 Africa |
| 5th | 2019 Europe |
| 6th | 2020 USA |
Giants Live
| 2nd | 2019 Giants Live Wembley |
Shaw Classic
| 5th | 2020 Shaw Classic |
| 14th | 2021 Shaw Classic |
America's Strongest Man
| 1st | 2017 America's Strongest Man |
All-American Strongman Challenge
| 1st | 2013 All-American Strongman |
| 1st | 2014 All-American Strongman |
Britain's Strongest Man
| 2nd | 2013 Britain's Strongest Man |

Jerry Pritchett (born 18 December 1980) is an American retired Strongman. He was a regular entrant to the World's Strongest Man competition winning 4th place in 2020 and 3rd place in Master's category in 2021. He is also America's Strongest Man in 2017 and won All-American Strongman Challenge back to back in 2013 and 2014. Pritchett has competed in 44 International strongman competitions and is widely regarded as one of the best deadlifters of all-time.

== Background ==
As a professional metal fabricator, Pritchett was always interested in strength and implemented several strongman movements into his training to help with powerlifting. Pritchett began his strength career in powerlifting, competing extensively between 1996 and 2012.

In 2008 he took part in a local Strongman contest in Phoenix, Arizona and took second place, thus sparking his drive to continue and pursue Strongman.

== Career ==
After taking part in All-American Strongman Challenge in 2010, 2011 and 2012, Pritchett participated in his first Giants Live competition in Poland and placed fourth. He was invited to World's Strongest Man (WSM) in 2012 but did not make it beyond the group stages.

The following year, Pritchett won the 2013 All-American Strongman Challenge and placed seventh in his inaugural Arnold Strongman Classic. He again couldn't advance into the World's Strongest Man finals.

Next year Pritchett won the 2014 All-American Strongman Challenge and placed sixth at the Arnold Strongman Classic. At the World's Strongest Man, he made it to the finals for the first time and placed ninth in arguably the most stacked lineup in WSM history with twelve athletes.

In 2015 he placed eighth at the Arnold Strongman Classic and tenth, again, at the World's Strongest Man finals.

At the 2016 Europe's Strongest Man, Pritchett deadlifted 465 kg (1,025 lb) raw (without a deadlift suit and using straps in strongman standards), to equal the all-time deadlift world record with Eddie Hall and Benedikt Magnússon. He also placed sixth at Arnold Strongman Classic and fourth at Giants Live North American Open.

In the 2017 Arnold Strongman Classic, Pritchett placed third behind Brian Shaw and Hafþór Júlíus Björnsson and also broke the raw elephant bar deadlift world record with 467.5 kg (1,031 lb). He also won second at 2017 Arnold South America, third at 2017 Arnold Europe and won 2017 America's Strongest Man.

In the 2018 Arnold Strongman Classic he dropped to sixth and won third in 2018 Arnold Africa. In 2019 Arnold Strongman Classic he further dropped to ninth and won third in 2019 Arnold Africa and second in 2019 Giants Live Wembley.

In 2020, he earned his best performance in World's Strongest Man, securing fourth place in the finals behind Oleksii Novikov, Tom Stoltman and Jean-François Caron. He also placed fifth at the inaugural Shaw Classic.

Despite placing third at 2021 Masters World's Strongest Man, Pritchett couldn't come into his usual talents at the Rogue Invitational or Shaw Classic competitions and has not competed in professional strongman since 2022.

== Personal records ==
- Deadlift – 465 kg (1,025 lb) (2016 Europe's Strongest Man) (former world record)

→ Former joint all-time world record and former standard bar strongman raw world record

- Elephant bar Deadlift – 467.5 kg (1,031 lb) (2017 Arnold Strongman Classic) (former world record)

→ Former elephant bar raw world record and former all time strongman raw world record

- Raw Deadlift – 415 kg (915 lb) (2016 IPL Fit Con World Cup)
- Giant Barbell Squat (for reps) – 329 kg (725 lb) × 11 reps (single-ply suit w/ wraps) (2014 World's Strongest Man)
- Bench Press – 272.5 kg (601 lb) (in single-ply equipment) (2010 WABDL World Championships)
- Log press – 191 kg (421 lb) (2020 Shaw Classic)
- Timber carry – 408.25 kg (900 lb) (40-foot inclined ramp) in 9.58 seconds (raw grip) (2018 Arnold Strongman Classic) (World Record)
- Frame carry (with straps) – 365 kg (805 lb) 30m course in 15.02 seconds (2016 Giants Live North American Open) (World Record)
- Max Atlas Stone – 220 kg (485 lb) (2019 Arnold Africa)
- Atlas Stone (for reps) – 205 kg (452 lb) x 4 reps over 4 ft bar (2013 Arnold Strongman Classic)
- Inver Stone press – 136 kg (300 lb) (2020 Arnold Strongman Classic) (Joint-World Record)
- IronMind Rolling Thunder (V2) – 98 kg (216 lb) (2012 Visegrip Viking)
- Double overhand Axle deadlift – 190 kg (419 lb) (2012 Visegrip Viking)

== Other pursuits ==
Pritchett has raced as a sprint car driver.
