= 2014 Europe's Strongest Man =

Strongman competition in Leeds, England

Competition information
- Dates: 9 August 2014
- Venue: Headingley Stadium
- Location: Leeds
- Country: United Kingdom
- Athletes participating: 10
- Nations participating: 7

Champion(s)
- (Iceland) Hafþór Björnsson

The 2014 Europe's Strongest Man was a strongman competition that took place in Leeds, England on 9 August 2014 at the Headingley Stadium. This event was part of the 2014 Giants live tour.

Following his back to back victories from 2014 Giants Live Melbourne and the 2014 World's Strongest Viking, Iceland's Hafþór Björnsson won his first Europe's Strongest Man title.

== Participants ==
- Hafþór Björnsson (ISL)
- Eddie Hall (UK)
- Martin Wildauer (AUT)
- Laurence Shahlaei (UK)
- Johannes Årsjö (SWE)
- Mark Felix (UK)
- Krzysztof Radzikowski (POL)
- Graham Hicks (UK)
- Vytautas Lalas (LTU)
- Mikhail Koklyaev (RUS)

== Results of events ==
=== Event 1: Max Deadlift ===
- Weight: Starting weight 380 kilograms (840 lb)

#	Athlete	Nation	Weight	Event Points	Overall Points
1	Eddie Hall (Note: Mikhail Koklyaev, Eddie Hall, Laurence Shahlaei and Vytautas Lalas sustained injuries in this event and took no further part in the competition.)	United Kingdom	446 kilograms (983 lb)	10	10
2	Martin Wildauer	Austria	435 kilograms (959 lb)	8.5	8.5
2	Laurence Shahlaei	United Kingdom	435 kilograms (959 lb)	8.5	8.5
4	Hafþór Björnsson	Iceland	420 kilograms (930 lb)	6	6
4	Johannes Årsjö	Sweden	420 kilograms (930 lb)	6	6
4	Mark Felix	United Kingdom	420 kilograms (930 lb)	6	6
7	Krzysztof Radzikowski	Poland	400 kilograms (880 lb)	3	3
7	Graham Hicks	United Kingdom	400 kilograms (880 lb)	3	3
7	Vytautas Lalas	Lithuania	400 kilograms (880 lb)	3	3
10	Mikhail Koklyaev	Russia	N/A	0	0

Athlete	Nation	Weight
Benedikt Magnússon (Note: Benedikt Magnússon who took part only in the Deadlift event as a part of The World Deadlift Championships pulled 461 kilograms (1,016 lb) for a new world record. This lift surpassed his own Powerlifting Deadlift world record of 460.4 kilograms (1,015 lb), thus the strongman Deadlift world record surpassed the powerlifting world record for the first time.)	Iceland	461 kilograms (1,016 lb)
Andy Bolton	United Kingdom	400 kilograms (880 lb)

=== Event 2: Super Yoke ===
- Weight: 450 kilograms (990 lb)
- Course Length: 40 metres (130 ft)

#	Athlete	Nation	Time	Event Points	Overall Points
1	Johannes Årsjö	Sweden	21.25	10	16
2	Hafþór Björnsson	Iceland	21.31	9	15
3	Krzysztof Radzikowski	Poland	22.75	8	11
4	Graham Hicks	United Kingdom	22.81	7	10
5	Mark Felix	United Kingdom	24.15	6	12
6	Martin Wildauer	Austria	24.84	5	13.5

=== Event 3: Front Hold ===
- Weight: 30 kilograms (66 lb)

#	Athlete	Nation	Time	Event Points	Overall Points
1	Hafþór Björnsson	Iceland	50.56	10	25
2	Graham Hicks	United Kingdom	44.78	9	19
3	Krzysztof Radzikowski	Poland	44.28	8	19
4	Johannes Årsjö	Sweden	37.22	7	23
5	Mark Felix	United Kingdom	35.13	6	18
6	Martin Wildauer	Austria	20.40	5	18.5

=== Event 4: Dumbbell Press ===
- Weight: 100 kilograms (220 lb)
- Time Limit: 60 seconds

#	Athlete	Nation	Repetitions	Event Points	Overall Points
1	Hafþór Björnsson	Iceland	8 reps	10	35
2	Graham Hicks	United Kingdom	6 reps	9	28
3	Krzysztof Radzikowski	Poland	5 reps	7.5	26.5
3	Johannes Årsjö	Sweden	5 reps	7.5	30.5
5	Mark Felix	United Kingdom	3 reps	6	24
6	Martin Wildauer	Austria	2 reps	5	23.5

=== Event 5: Atlas Stones ===
- Weight: 6 stone series ranging from 100–200 kilograms (220–440 lb).

#	Athlete	Nation	Time	Event Points	Overall Points
1	Hafþór Björnsson (Note: Hafþór Björnsson who was the only athlete to finish all 6 stones established a new world record in the 6 stone x 100–200 kilograms (220–440 lb) Atlas stones run.)	Iceland	6 in 27.05	10	45
2	Johannes Årsjö	Sweden	5 in 22.61	9	39.5
3	Graham Hicks	United Kingdom	5 in 30.18	8	36
4	Mark Felix	United Kingdom	5 in 41.29	7	31
5	Krzysztof Radzikowski	Poland	4 in 19.99	6	32.5
6	Martin Wildauer (Note: Martin Wildauer sustained an injury in this event and couldn't complete the competition.)	Austria	1 in 4.00	5	28.5

=== Event 6: Loading Race ===
- Weight: 2 x barrels and 2 x sacks, each weighing 125 kilograms (276 lb) to be loaded in to a pick up truck and the tailgate to be closed.
- Course Length: 12 metres (39 ft)
- Time Limit: 1 minute 15 seconds

#	Athlete	Nation	Time	Event Points	Overall Points
1	Hafþór Björnsson	Iceland	4 in 38.55	10	55
2	Graham Hicks	United Kingdom	4 in 48.62	9	45
3	Johannes Årsjö	Sweden	4 in 49.50	8	47.5
4	Krzysztof Radzikowski	Poland	4 in 59.37	7	39.5
5	Mark Felix	United Kingdom	3 in 41.00	6	37

== Final results ==
#	Athlete	Nation	Points
1st place, gold medalist(s)	Hafþór Björnsson	Iceland	55
2nd place, silver medalist(s)	Johannes Årsjö	Sweden	47.5
3rd place, bronze medalist(s)	Graham Hicks	United Kingdom	45
4	Krzysztof Radzikowski	Poland	39.5
5	Mark Felix	United Kingdom	37
6	Martin Wildauer	Austria	28.5
7	Eddie Hall	United Kingdom	10
8	Laurence Shahlaei	United Kingdom	8.5
9	Vytautas Lalas	Lithuania	3
10	Mikhail Koklyaev	Russia	0

Preceded by 2013 Europe's Strongest Man	Europe's Strongest Man	Succeeded by 2015 Europe's Strongest Man
