= Krzysztof Radzikowski =

Polish strength athlete

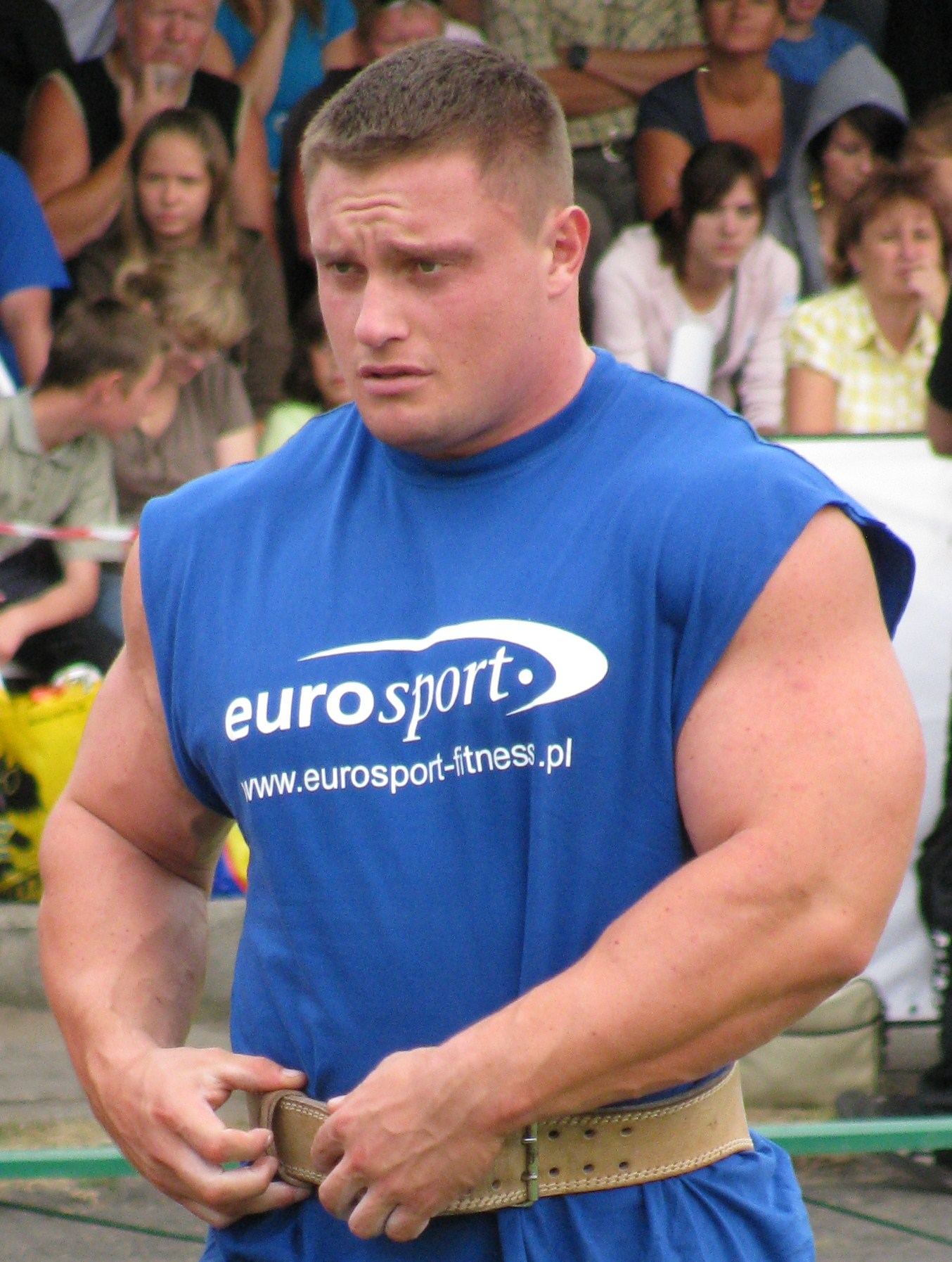

Personal information
- Born: August 18, 1981 (age 45) Głowno, Poland
- Occupation: Strongman
- Height: 187 cm (6 ft 1 1/2 in)
- Weight: 198 kg (437 lb)
Medal record
Strongman
Representing Poland
World's Strongest Man
Qualified	2011 World's Strongest Man
6th	2012 World's Strongest Man
Qualified	2013 World's Strongest Man
Qualified	2015 World's Strongest Man
Qualified	2018 World's Strongest Man
Arnold Strongman Classic
4th	2013 Arnold Strongman Classic
10th	2014 Arnold Strongman Classic
10th	2017 Arnold Strongman Classic
Europe's Strongest Man
6th	2008 Europe's Strongest Man
2nd	2009 Europe's Strongest Man
10th	2010 Europe's Strongest Man
4th	2012 Europe's Strongest Man
3rd	2013 Europe's Strongest Man
4th	2014 Europe's Strongest Man
2nd	2015 Europe's Strongest Man
9th	2018 Europe's Strongest Man
World's Strongest Viking
2nd	2015 World's Strongest Viking
3rd	2016 World's Strongest Viking
2nd	2017 World's Strongest Viking
1st	2018 World's Strongest Viking
1st	2019 World's Strongest Viking
Giants Live
1st	2011 Giants Live Poland
1st	2012 Giants Live Poland
2nd	2013 Giants Live Poland
7th	2014 Giants Live Poland
Strongman Champions League
3rd	2012 SCL Poland
4th	2012 SCL Savickas Classic
3rd	2012 SCL Martinique
1st	2013 SCL Lapland
3rd	2013 SCL FIBO
1st	2013 SCL Czech Republic
3rd	2013 SCL Holland
12th	2013 SCL China
1st	2013 SCL Portugal
2nd	2013 SCL Hungary
2nd	2013 SCL Slovakia
5th	2013 SCL Russia
1st	2013 SCL Poland
2nd	2013 SCL Gibraltar
3rd	2013 SCL Savickas Classic
2nd	2013 SCL Brazil
3rd	2013 SCL World Finals
4th	2014 SCL Martinique
6th	2014 SCL FIBO
5th	2014 SCL Serbia
3rd	2014 SCL Croatia
1st	2014 SCL Poland
1st	2014 SCL Hungary
1st	2014 SCL Zambia
1st	2014 SCL Romania
8th	2014 SCL Savickas Classic
3rd	2014 SCL Estonia
3rd	2014 SCL World Finals
1st	2015 SCL FIBO
1st	2015 SCL Finland
2nd	2015 SCL Bulgaria
3rd	2015 SCL Latvia
2nd	2015 SCL Croatia
3rd	2015 SCL Poland
2nd	2015 SCL Austria
2nd	2015 SCL Romania
2nd	2015 SCL Portugal
1st	2015 SCL World Finals
1st	2016 SCL FIBO
4th	2016 SCL Curaçao
2nd	2016 SCL Portugal
2nd	2016 SCL World Finals
3rd	2017 SCL Finland
5th	2017 SCL Romania
2nd	2017 SCL Greece
7th	2017 SCL World Finals
1st	2018 SCL FIBO
11th	2018 SCL Abu Dhabi
2nd	2018 SCL Romania
2nd	2018 SCL World Finals
1st	2019 SCL FIBO
14th	2019 SCL Holland
6th	2019 SCL Curaçao
4th	2019 SCL World Finals
World Strongman Federation
3rd	2011 WSF Persian Cup
1st	2012 WSF World Championship
1st	2012 WSF World Cup Uzbekistan
1st	2012 Elite Strongman Moscow
Strongman Super Series
5th	2009 Venice Beach Grand Prix
4th	2009 Sweden Grand Prix
9th	2010 Mohegan Sun Grand Prix
Arnold Pro Strongman World Series
2nd	2012 Arnold Europe
2nd	2015 Arnold Australia
1st	2015 Festival des Hommes Forts de Warwick
2nd	2016 Arnold Australia
3rd	2016 Arnold South America
3rd	2016 Arnold Europe
12th	2017 Festival des Hommes Forts de Warwick
2nd	2017 Arnold Europe
4th	2018 Arnold Europe
Força Bruta
3rd	2013 Força Bruta
8th	2014 Força Bruta
2nd	2015 Força Bruta
3rd	2016 Força Bruta
3rd	2017 Força Bruta
World Log Lift Championships
5th	2008 World Log Lift Championships
2nd	2009 World Log Lift Championships
2nd	2012 World Log Lift Championships
Poland's Strongest Man
3rd	2008 Poland's Strongest Man
3rd	2009 Poland's Strongest Man
1st	2012 Poland's Strongest Man
1st	2013 Poland's Strongest Man
3rd	2015 Poland's Strongest Man

Krzysztof Edward Radzikowski (born August 18, 1981) is a professional strongman competitor from Głowno, Poland. He has competed in 112 International strongman competitions (2nd highest in history) and has won 24 of them, making him the sixth most decorated strongman in history.

== Strongman career ==
Radzikowski started his strongman career in 2005 when he entered the Poland's Strongest Man competition. In 2008 he qualified to the Europe's Strongest Man competition and in the following year, won second place behind Mariusz Pudzianowski. His career took to the next level when he started to complete prolifically at Strongman Super Series, World Strongman Federation and Strongman Champions League.

Radzikowski's first international win came in 2011 when he won 2011 Giants Live Poland competition. This victory qualified him for the 2011 World's Strongest Man contest, his first time in WSM, but he failed to qualify for the finals.

Radzikowski won the inaugural 2012 WSF World Strongmen Championships in Dubai, UAE, the WSF World Cup Uzbekistan in Tashkent, Uzbekistan and 2012 Giants Live Poland. This victory qualified him for the 2012 World's Strongest Man contest in Los Angeles, California where he emerged sixth place. In the same year he also won the Elite Strongman Moscow competition.

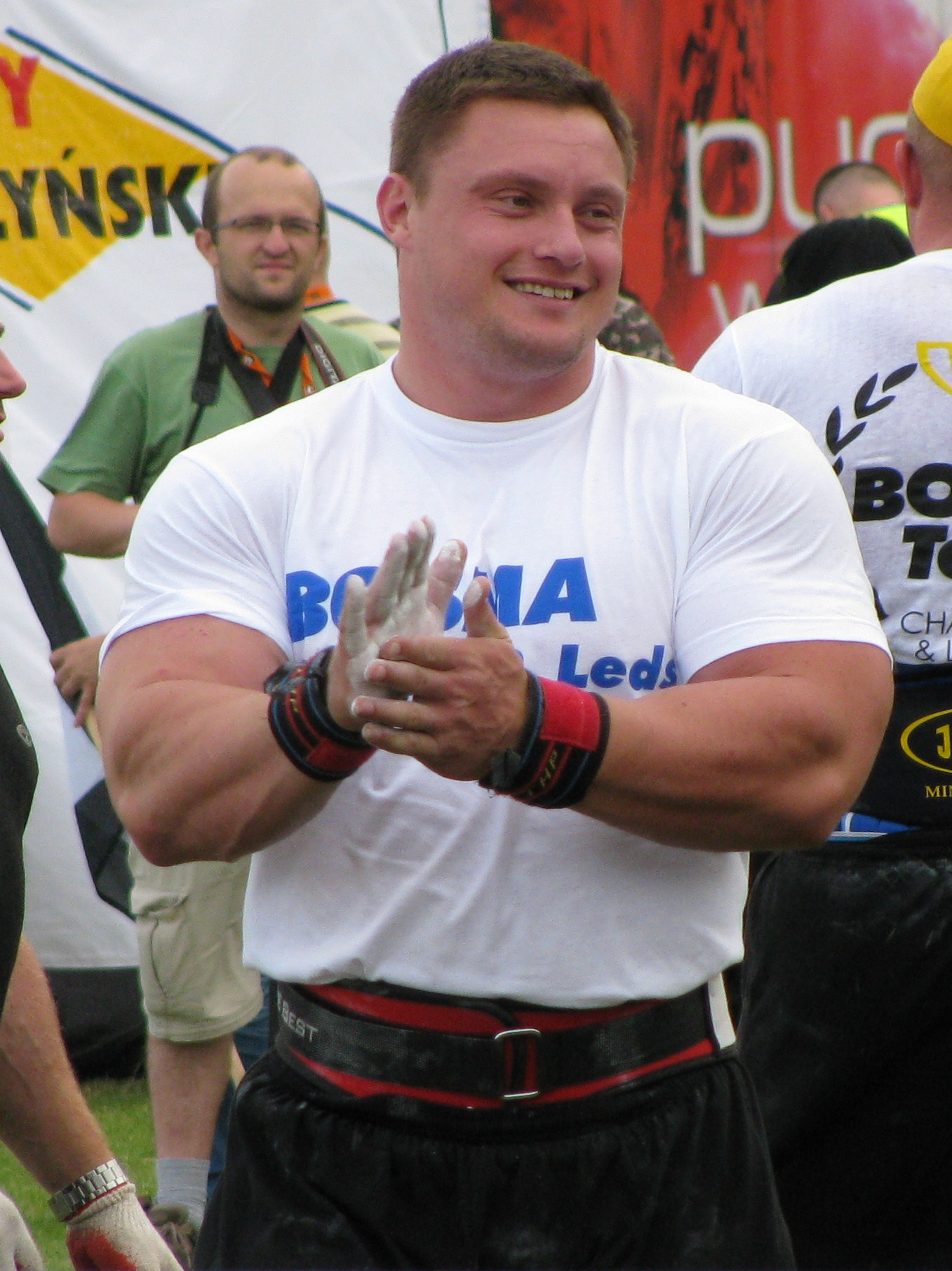

From 2013 onwards Radzikowski competed across the Strongman Champions League prolifically and started winning and reaching the podium in multiple competitions.

He won 2013 SCL Lapland, 2013 SCL Czech Republic, 2013 SCL Portugal, 2013 & 2014 SCL Poland, 2014 SCL Hungary, 2014 SCL Zambia, 2014 SCL Romania, 2015 SCL FIBO, 2015 SCL Finland, 2015 Festival des Hommes Forts de Warwick, 2015 SCL World Finals, 2016 SCL FIBO, 2018 SCL Norway, 2018 SCL FIBO, 2019 SCL Norway and 2019 SCL FIBO.

== Personal records ==
=== During training ===
- Deadlift (Raw) – 410 kg (904 lb)
- Deadlift (Raw) – 430 kg (948 lb) with wrist straps
- Squat (Raw) – 400 kg (882 lb)
- Squat (for reps) Raw – 360 kg (794 lb) x 4 reps
- Bench Press (Raw) – 300 kg (661 lb)
- Clean and press (for reps) – 175 kg (386 lb) x 10 reps

=== In competitions ===
- Deadlift – 415 kg (915 lb) (2012 Arnold Europe)
- Overhead push press – 240 kg (529 lb) (Europe's Strongest Man 2009 Qualifier) (former joint-World Record)
- Log press – 217.5 kg (480 lb) (2016 Arnold Australia) (Polish Record)
- Log press (with SCL giant log) – 206 kg (454 lb) (2015 SCL FIBO, Germany) (Former World Record)
- Axle press (for reps) – 150 kg (331 lb) x 9 reps (2014 SCL Poland) (World Record)
- Viking press – 160 kg (353 lb) x 15 reps (2016 World's Strongest Viking / SCL Norway)
- Block press – 140 kg (309 lb) (2014 Savickas Classic)
- Circus Dumbbell press – 120 kg (265 lb) x 5 reps (2013 SCL Russia)
- Kettlebell press for reps (one arm) – 80 kg (176 lb) x 9 reps (2011 Globe's Strongest Man) (Joint-World Record)
- Super Yoke – 510 kg (1,124 lb), 12 metres in 11.28 seconds (2013 Força Bruta) (World Record)
- Viking ship mast Super Yoke – 410 kg (904 lb), 10 metres (33 ft) long log for 14 meters (2015 World's Strongest Viking / SCL Norway) (Joint-World Record)
- Atlas Stone (for reps) – 205 kg (452 lb) x 3 reps over 4 ft bar (2013 Arnold Strongman Classic)
- Keg toss – 8 kegs 18–24 kg (40–53 lb) over 5.2 metres (17 ft 1 in) bar in 21.04 sec (2013 SCL Poland) (World Record)
- Shot put – 14 kg (31 lb) for 10.07 metres (33 ft 1 in) (2016 SCL Curacao) (World Record)
- Front hold – 40 kg (88 lb) for 32.44 seconds (2015 SCL Poland)
- Viking Boat pull (without the sails) – 3,000 kg (6,614 lb) harness only/ no rope for 25 meters 'in ice terrain' - 16.67 seconds (2017 World's Strongest Viking / SCL Norway) (World Record)
- Excavator pull – 16,000 kg (35,274 lb) for 25 meter course in 35.74 seconds (2014 SCL Zambia) (World Record)

== See also ==
- List of Poles
