= Dimitar Savatinov =

Bulgarian strongman (born 1980)

Personal information
- Nationality: Bulgarian, American
- Born: 5 May 1980 (age 46) Bulgaria
- Occupation: Strongman
- Height: 5 ft 10 in (1.78 m)
- Weight: 145–165 kg (320–364 lb)
Medal record
Strongman
Representing Bulgaria
World's Strongest Man
Qualified	2014 World's Strongest Man
7th	2015 World's Strongest Man
Qualified	2017 World's Strongest Man
Arnold Strongman Classic
9th	2014 Arnold Strongman Classic
4th	2015 Arnold Strongman Classic
8th	2016 Arnold Strongman Classic
7th	2017 Arnold Strongman Classic
9th	2018 Arnold Strongman Classic
Europe's Strongest Man
6th	2015 Europe's Strongest Man
6th	2016 Europe's Strongest Man
America's Strongest Man
3rd	2013 America's Strongest Man
1st	2014 America's Strongest Man
1st	2015 America's Strongest Man
3rd	2016 America's Strongest Man
2nd	2017 America's Strongest Man

Dimitar Savatinov (born 5 May 1980) is a Bulgarian-American Strongman and the former American Deadlift record holder with 467.5 kg (1,031 lb). He also previously held the world record for the Max Dumbbell press with 143 kg (315 lb).

== Career ==
Savatinov was a high school wrestler and continued wrestling while at the Bulgarian Army. In 2006, he came to the United States and while working at Ringling Brothers Circus, pursued powerlifting. He entered his first local strongman contest in 2009.

In 2014 and 2015, he won America's Strongest Man becoming only the fifth man to win the title twice. In 2015 he secured fourth place at 2015 Arnold Strongman Classic and 7th place in World's Strongest Man. In 2015 and 2016, he also secured sixth place in Europe's Strongest Man.

== Personal records ==
- Deadlift (Equipped and with straps) – 467.5 kg (1,031 lb) (Former American Record)
- Elephant bar Deadlift (Raw with straps) – 422.5 kg (931 lb)
- Elevated Axle Deadlift (Equipped and with straps/ 18 inches off the floor) – 501 kg (1,105 lb) (Unofficial World Record)
- Squat (Raw with wraps) – 445 kg (981 lb)
- Bench press – 257.5 kg (568 lb)
- Log press – 209 kg (461 lb)
- Shoulder press (push press) – 240 kg (529 lb)
- Circus Dumbbell press – 143 kg (315 lb) (Former World Record)
- Cyr Dumbbell press (for reps) – 124.5 kg (274 lb) x 6 reps (Joint-World Record)
- Max Atlas stone – 200 kg (441 lb) as a part of a 5 stone run
