= 2015 Europe's Strongest Man =

Strongman competition in Leeds, England

Competition information
- Dates: 10 July 2015
- Venue: Headingley Stadium
- Location: Leeds
- Country: United Kingdom
- Athletes participating: 10
- Nations participating: 7

Champion(s)
- (Iceland) Hafþór Björnsson

The 2015 Europe's Strongest Man was a strongman competition that took place in Leeds, England on 10 July 2015 at the Headingley Stadium. This event was part of the 2015 Giants live tour.

Reigning champion Hafþór Björnsson won his second Europe's Strongest Man title.

== Participants ==
- Eddie Hall (UK)
- Rauno Heinla (EST)
- Dainis Zageris (LAT)
- Hafþór Björnsson (ISL)
- Matjaz Belsak (SLO)
- Mark Felix (UK)
- Krzysztof Radzikowski (POL)
- Luke Stoltman (UK)
- Terry Hollands (UK)
- Dimitar Savatinov (BUL)

== Results of events ==
=== Event 1: Max Deadlift ===
- Weight: Starting weight 380 kilograms (840 lb)

| # | Athlete | Nation | Weight | Event Points | Overall Points |
|---|---|---|---|---|---|
| 1 | Eddie Hall | United Kingdom | 463 kilograms (1,021 lb) | 10 | 10 |
| 2 | Hafþór Björnsson | Iceland | 450 kilograms (990 lb) | 9 | 9 |
| 3 | Rauno Heinla (Note: Rauno Heinla sustained an injury in this event and took no further part in the competition.) | Estonia | 435 kilograms (959 lb) | 8 | 8 |
| 4 | Krzysztof Radzikowski | Poland | 400 kilograms (880 lb) | 5 | 5 |
| 4 | Mark Felix | United Kingdom | 400 kilograms (880 lb) | 5 | 5 |
| 4 | Dainis Zageris | Latvia | 400 kilograms (880 lb) | 5 | 5 |
| 4 | Matjaz Belsak | Slovenia | 400 kilograms (880 lb) | 5 | 5 |
| 4 | Terry Hollands | United Kingdom | 400 kilograms (880 lb) | 5 | 5 |
| 9 | Dimitar Savatinov | Bulgaria | 380 kilograms (840 lb) | 2 | 2 |
| 10 | Luke Stoltman | United Kingdom | N/A | 0 | 0 |

=== Event 2: Medley ===
- Weight: 1 x barrel, 1 x tyre and 1 x sack. Also 200 kilograms (440 lb) duck walk.
- Course Length: 15 metres (49 ft)
- Time Limit: 75 seconds

| # | Athlete | Nation | Time | Event Points | Overall Points |
|---|---|---|---|---|---|
| 1 | Hafþór Björnsson | Iceland | 34.59 | 10 | 19 |
| 2 | Eddie Hall (Note: Eddie Hall sustained an injury in this event and took no further part in the competition.) | United Kingdom | 38.56 | 9 | 19 |
| 3 | Dainis Zageris | Latvia | 39.82 | 8 | 13 |
| 4 | Krzysztof Radzikowski | Poland | 45.39 | 7 | 12 |
| 5 | Matjaz Belsak | Slovenia | 46.43 | 6 | 11 |
| 6 | Luke Stoltman | United Kingdom | 46.73 | 5 | 5 |
| 7 | Mark Felix | United Kingdom | 48.60 | 4 | 9 |
| 8 | Terry Hollands | United Kingdom | 7.2 metres (24 ft) | 3 | 8 |
| 9 | Dimitar Savatinov | Bulgaria | 2.4 metres (7 ft 10 in) | 2 | 4 |

=== Event 3: Car Walk ===
- Weight: 440 kilograms (970 lb)
- Course Length: 30 metres (98 ft)

| # | Athlete | Nation | Time | Event Points | Overall Points |
|---|---|---|---|---|---|
| 1 | Hafþór Björnsson | Iceland | 40.00 | 10 | 29 |
| 2 | Mark Felix | United Kingdom | 27.3 metres (90 ft) | 9 | 18 |
| 3 | Krzysztof Radzikowski | Poland | 23.2 metres (76 ft) | 8 | 20 |
| 4 | Dainis Zageris | Latvia | 20.4 metres (67 ft) | 7 | 20 |
| 5 | Dimitar Savatinov | Bulgaria | 15.8 metres (52 ft) | 6 | 10 |
| 6 | Matjaz Belsak | Slovenia | 15.3 metres (50 ft) | 5 | 16 |
| 7 | Luke Stoltman | United Kingdom | 12.9 metres (42 ft) | 4 | 9 |
| 8 | Terry Hollands | United Kingdom | 1.4 metres (4 ft 7 in) | 3 | 11 |

=== Event 4: Front Hold ===
- Weight: 30 kilograms (66 lb)

| # | Athlete | Nation | Time | Event Points | Overall Points |
|---|---|---|---|---|---|
| 1 | Krzysztof Radzikowski | Poland | 53.88 | 10 | 30 |
| 2 | Mark Felix | United Kingdom | 52.47 | 9 | 27 |
| 3 | Dainis Zageris | Latvia | 45.27 | 8 | 28 |
| 4 | Hafþór Björnsson | Iceland | 45.22 | 7 | 36 |
| 5 | Matjaz Belsak | Slovenia | 40.48 | 6 | 22 |
| 6 | Terry Hollands | United Kingdom | 36.58 | 5 | 16 |
| 7 | Dimitar Savatinov | Bulgaria | 36.20 | 4 | 14 |
| 8 | Luke Stoltman | United Kingdom | 34.45 | 3 | 12 |

=== Event 5: Log Lift ===
- Weight: 150 kilograms (330 lb) for as many repetitions as possible.
- Time Limit: 60 seconds

| # | Athlete | Nation | Repetitions | Event Points | Overall Points |
|---|---|---|---|---|---|
| 1 | Krzysztof Radzikowski | Poland | 6 | 10 | 40 |
| 2 | Dimitar Savatinov | Bulgaria | 5 | 9 | 23 |
| 3 | Luke Stoltman | United Kingdom | 4 | 8 | 20 |
| 4 | Dainis Zageris | Latvia | 3 | 6 | 34 |
| 4 | Hafþór Björnsson | Iceland | 3 | 6 | 42 |
| 4 | Matjaz Belsak | Slovenia | 3 | 6 | 28 |
| 7 | Mark Felix | United Kingdom | 2 | 4 | 31 |
| 8 | Terry Hollands | United Kingdom | 1 | 3 | 19 |

=== Event 6: Atlas Stones ===
- Weight: 6 stone series ranging from 100–200 kilograms (220–440 lb).

| # | Athlete | Nation | Time | Event Points | Overall Points |
|---|---|---|---|---|---|
| 1 | Hafþór Björnsson | Iceland | 6 in 30.39 | 10 | 52 |
| 2 | Mark Felix | United Kingdom | 6 in 37.30 | 9 | 40 |
| 3 | Krzysztof Radzikowski | Poland | 6 in 39.22 | 8 | 48 |
| 4 | Matjaz Belsak | Slovenia | 6 in 42.61 | 7 | 35 |
| 5 | Dainis Zageris | Latvia | 5 in 24.94 | 6 | 40 |
| 6 | Terry Hollands | United Kingdom | 5 in 25.44 | 5 | 24 |
| 7 | Luke Stoltman | United Kingdom | 5 in 31.81 | 4 | 24 |
| 8 | Dimitar Savatinov | Bulgaria | 5 in 33.02 | 3 | 26 |

== Final results ==
| # | Athlete | Nation | Points |
|---|---|---|---|
| 1st place, gold medalist(s) | Hafþór Björnsson | Iceland | 52 |
| 2nd place, silver medalist(s) | Krzysztof Radzikowski | Poland | 48 |
| 3rd place, bronze medalist(s) | Mark Felix | United Kingdom | 40 |
| 3rd place, bronze medalist(s) | Dainis Zageris | Latvia | 40 |
| 5 | Matjaz Belsak | Slovenia | 35 |
| 6 | Dimitar Savatinov | Bulgaria | 26 |
| 7 | Terry Hollands | United Kingdom | 24 |
| 7 | Luke Stoltman | United Kingdom | 24 |
| 9 | Eddie Hall | United Kingdom | 19 |
| 10 | Rauno Heinla | Estonia | 8 |

| Preceded by 2014 Europe's Strongest Man | Europe's Strongest Man | Succeeded by 2016 Europe's Strongest Man |
