= Dainis Zageris =

Latvian strongman (born 1982)

Personal information
- Nickname: The Titan
- Nationality: Latvian
- Born: 19 July 1982 (age 43)
- Occupation(s): Strongman and Powerlifter
- Height: 5 ft 11 in (1.80 m)
- Weight: 130–138 kg (287–304 lb)
Medal record
Strongman
Representing Latvia
World's Strongest Man
Qualified	2013 World's Strongest Man
Qualified	2015 World's Strongest Man
World's Strongest Viking
4th	2019 World's Strongest Viking
1st	2021 World's Strongest Viking
Europe's Strongest Man
3rd	2015 Europe's Strongest Man
10th	2017 Europe's Strongest Man
Strongman Champions League
3rd	2013 SCL Serbia
2nd	2013 SCL Latvia
3rd	2013 SCL Poland
3rd	2013 SCL Gibraltar
2nd	2014 SCL Portugal
3rd	2014 SCL Zambia
3rd	2015 SCL Holland
2nd	2015 SCL Poland
1st	2015 SCL Romania
1st	2015 SCL Martinique
2nd	2015 SCL World Finals
2nd	2016 SCL Latvia
3rd	2016 SCL Bulgaria
2nd	2016 SCL Curaçao
1st	2016 SCL Portugal
1st	2016 SCL World Finals
2nd	2017 SCL Finland
1st	2017 SCL Curaçao
1st	2017 SCL Greece
3rd	2017 SCL World Finals
2nd	2018 SCL FIBO
2nd	2018 SCL Abu Dhabi
1st	2018 SCL Holland
1st	2018 SCL Curaçao
1st	2018 SCL World Finals
1st	2019 SCL World Record Breakers
2nd	2019 SCL Curaçao
3rd	2019 SCL World Finals
1st	2020 SCL Finland
1st	2021 SCL World Record Breakers
1st	2022 SCL Bosnia

Dainis 'The Titan' Zageris (born 19 July 1982) is a Latvian strongman competitor and regular entrant to the Strongman Champions League. He has competed in 87 International strongman competitions (sixth highest in history) and has won 15 of them, making him the eleventh most decorated strongman in history.

== Career ==
Having competed prolifically in the Strongman Champions League from 2013 to 2022 throughout many Grand Prix competitions in Latvia, Germany, Netherlands, Finland, Norway, Serbia, Poland, Romania, Bulgaria, Bosnia and Herzegovina, Greece, Gibraltar, England, Curaçao, Portugal, Zambia, Martinique and United Arab Emirates, Zageris won 13 international titles, 10 silver medals and 8 bronze medals.

Zageris won 2021 World's Strongest Viking, and also is a two time World's Strongest Man entrant (2013 and 2015) and a Europe's Strongest Man bronze medalist (2015).

== Personal records ==
- Deadlift (Raw) – 400 kg (882 lb) (Push-Pull Bench Press and Deadlift Championship, Latvia - 2012)
- Bench press (Raw) – 255 kg (562 lb) (Push-Pull Bench Press and Deadlift Championship, Latvia - 2012)
- Log press – 200 kg (441 lb) (2018 SBD World Log Lift Championships)
- Log press (with SCL giant log) – 195 kg (430 lb) (2018 SCL FIBO)
- Block press – 140 kg (309 lb) (2014 Savickas Classic)
- Power stairs (3 x 225–275 kg (496–606 lb) duck walks / total of 18 steps) – 44.27 seconds (2014 SCL Latvia) (World Record)
- Weight over bar – 25.5 kg (56 lb) over 5.40 metres (17 ft 9 in) (2013 SCL Serbia)
- Front hold – 40 kg (88 lb) for 32.11 seconds (2015 SCL Poland)
- Arm over arm boat pull (on water) – 13,000 kg (28,660 lb) for 20 meters - 23.06 seconds (2014 SCL Croatia) (World Record)

== Mixed martial arts record ==
Res.	Record	Opponent	Method	Event	Date	Round	Time	Location	Notes
Win	1–0	Madars Trivols	Submission	MMA Bushido 91	February 17, 2024	1		Riga, Latvia	
