= 2018 Arnold Strongman Classic =

Strongman competition in 2018

Competition information
- Dates: 2-3 March 2018
- Venue: Greater Columbus Convention Center
- Location: Ohio, Columbus
- Country: United States
- Athletes participating: 10
- Nations participating: 8

Champion(s)
- (Iceland) Hafþór Björnsson

The 2018 Arnold Strongman Classic was a strongman contest that took place in Ohio, Columbus from 2–3 March 2018 at the Greater Columbus Convention Center. The Arnold Strongman Classic is the finale of the Arnold Strongman Tour and is seen as one of the biggest and most prestigious strongmen events on the circuit.

After continuous progression in the competition, coming 10th in 2012, 8th in 2013, 5th in 2014, 7th in 2015, 5th in 2016, and finally 2nd in 2017, Iceland's Hafþór Björnsson won his first Arnold Strongman Classic after defeating the winner from 2017, the American Brian Shaw, who came 2nd. Russia's Mikhail Shivlyakov secured 3rd place.

== Qualifying ==
To qualify for the Arnold Strongman Classic, athletes have to either win a sanctioned event on the Arnold Classic Tour (for example: Arnold Europe, Arnold Australia, Arnold Africa, and Arnold South America) or gain enough points to be invited through a wildcard system. Athletes that qualified (in alphabetical order/ surname) are as follows:

Matjaz Belsak (Slovenia), Hafthor Björnsson (Iceland), Jean-Francois Caron (Canada), Rauno Heinla (Estonia), Mateusz Kieliszkowski (Poland), Mateusz Ostazsewski (Poland), Jerry Pritchett (USA), Dimitar Savatinov (Bulgaria), Brian Shaw (USA) and Mikhael Shivlyakov (Russia).
Reserve: Vytautas Lalas (Lithuania)

== Event results ==
=== Event 1: Bag over bar ===
Contestants have to throw heavy sandbags from 'a duck walk to an overhead position' over a high bar.

- Weight: Starting weight was 50 pounds (23 kg).
- Bar height: 15 feet (4.57 m).
- Notes: 3 lifts per athlete and the heaviest weight for the win.

#	Athlete	Nation	Weight	Event Points	Overall Points
1	Hafþór Björnsson	Iceland	95 lb (43 kg)	10	10
2	Brian Shaw	United States	90 lb (41 kg)	9	9
3	Mikhail Shivlyakov	Russia	80 lb (36 kg)	8	8
4	JF Caron	Canada	75 lb (34 kg)	7	7
5	Mateusz Kieliszkowski	Poland	70 lb (32 kg)	5.5	5.5
5	Matjaz Belsak	Slovenia	70 lb (32 kg)	5.5	5.5
7	Rauno Heinla	Estonia	65 lb (29 kg)	4	4
8	Jerry Pritchett	United States	60 lb (27 kg)	3	3
9	Dimitar Savatinov	Bulgaria	55 lb (25 kg)	1.5	1.5
9	Mateusz Ostaszewski	Poland	55 lb (25 kg)	1.5	1.5

=== Event 2: Stone Shoulder ===
Contestants have to hoist the legendary Odd Haugen's Tombstone to their shoulder for many reps as possible.

- Weight: 190 kilograms (420 lb) Odd Haugen Tombstone.
- Time Limit: 2 Minutes & 30 seconds
- Notes: Highest number of reps for the win. 1 point for getting the stone off the ground, 2 points for standing up, 3 points for getting it to the chest and 5 points for getting it to the shoulder.

#	Athlete	Nation	Points	Event Points	Overall Points
1	Mateusz Kieliszkowski	Poland	20	10	15.5
2	Mikhail Shivlyakov	Russia	9	9	17
3	Hafþór Björnsson	Iceland	6	8	18
4	Brian Shaw	United States	4	6.5	15.5
4	Matjaz Belsak	Slovenia	4	6.5	12
6	JF Caron	Canada	3	4.5	11.5
6	Rauno Heinla	Estonia	3	4.5	8.5
8	Dimitar Savatinov	Bulgaria	2	3	4.5
9	Mateusz Ostaszewski	Poland	1	1.5	3
9	Jerry Pritchett	United States	1	1.5	4.5

=== Event 3: Timber Carry ===
Also known as the Frame Carry, contestants have to lift heavy barn timbers bolted together and travel up an inclined ramp.

- Weight: 900 pounds (410 kg) along a 35' inclined ramp for the fastest time to finish or else greatest distance.
- Time Limit: 30 seconds.
- Notes: Raw/ no straps allowed. Timber may be dropped and picked up.

#	Athlete	Nation	Time	Event Points	Overall Points
1	Jerry Pritchett (Note: Jerry Pritchett's time of 9.58 secs was a new strongman record.)	United States	9.58	10	14.5
2	Brian Shaw	United States	10.03	9	24.5
3	Hafþór Björnsson	Iceland	11.80	8	26
4	Mateusz Kieliszkowski	Poland	33' 2"	7	22.5
5	Mikhail Shivlyakov	Russia	24' 5"	6	23
6	JF Caron	Canada	18' 10"	5	16.5
7	Dimitar Savatinov	Bulgaria	15' 6"	4	8.5
8	Mateusz Ostaszewski	Poland	14' 6"	3	6
9	Matjaz Belsak	Slovenia	13' 7"	2	14
10	Rauno Heinla	Estonia	1' 2"	1	9.5

=== Event 4: Elephant Bar Deadlift ===
Contestants are required to lift a specially designed extra whipping long bar with Arnold Schwarzenegger inscribed weight plates from a standard 9" height. The apparatus was designed and manufactured by Rogue Fitness.

- Weight: Starting weight was 340 kilograms (750 lb).
- Time Limit: 60 seconds per lift
- Notes: 3 lifts per athlete, weights to be submitted before each round. Heaviest lift wins.

#	Athlete	Nation	Weight	Event Points	Overall Points
1	Hafþór Björnsson (Note: Hafþór Björnsson's lift of 472 kilograms (1,041 lb) was a new world record for the elephant bar deadlift.)	Iceland	472 kg (1,041 lb)	10	36
2	JF Caron	Canada	463 kg (1,021 lb)	9	25.5
3	Brian Shaw	United States	460 kg (1,014 lb)	8	32.5
4	Jerry Pritchett	United States	444 kg (979 lb)	7	21.5
5	Mikhail Shivlyakov	Russia	426 kg (939 lb)	6	29
6	Rauno Heinla	Estonia	424 kg (935 lb)	5	14.5
7	Dimitar Savatinov	Bulgaria	422 kg (931 lb)	4	12.5
8	Matjaz Belsak	Slovenia	401 kg (884 lb)	3	17
9	Mateusz Kieliszkowski	Poland	370 kg (816 lb)	2	24.5
10	Mateusz Ostaszewski	Poland	DNF	1	7

This is also the only instance in the history of the event (2016 - 2023), that 3 athletes pulled more than 1,000 lbs.

=== Event 5: Apollon's Wheels ===
A unique barbell made famous by the traditional strongman Louis 'Apollon' Uni, reproduced by Ivanko Barbell Company, the Axle is a replica of the original with the same bar thickness.

- Weight: 181.5 kilograms (400 lb) For max repetitions.
- Time Limit: 2 Minutes.
- Notes: Reps must begin with wheels on the platform. Highest number of points win.

#	Athlete	Nation	Repetitions	Event Points	Overall Points
1	Hafþór Björnsson	Iceland	4 reps	10	46
2	Brian Shaw	United States	3 reps + 1 clean	9	41.5
3	Rauno Heinla	Estonia	2 reps + 1 clean	8	22.5
4	Matjaz Belsak	Slovenia	1 rep + 1 clean	7	24
5	Dimitar Savatinov	Bulgaria	1 rep	6	18.5
6	Mateusz Kieliszkowski	Poland	0 reps + 2 cleans	4.5	29
6	Mateusz Ostaszewski	Poland	0 reps + 2 cleans	4.5	11.5
8	Jerry Pritchett	United States	0 reps + 1 clean	2.5	24
8	JF Caron	Canada	0 reps + 1 clean	2.5	28
10	Mikhail Shivlyakov	Russia	No lift	1	30

== Final standings ==
#	Athlete	Nation	Points	Prize money
1st place, gold medalist(s)	Hafþór Björnsson	Iceland	46	$72,000
2nd place, silver medalist(s)	Brian Shaw	United States	41.5	$22,000
3rd place, bronze medalist(s)	Mikhail Shivlyakov	Russia	30	$17,000
4	Mateusz Kieliszkowski	Poland	29	$12,000
5	JF Caron	Canada	28	$10,000
6	Jerry Pritchett	United States	24	$6,500
6	Matjaz Belsak	Slovenia	24	$6,500
8	Rauno Heinla	Estonia	22.5	$4,000
9	Dimitar Savatinov	Bulgaria	18.5	$3,000
10	Mateusz Ostaszewski	Poland	11.5	$2,000

Preceded by 2017 Arnold Strongman Classic	Arnold Strongman Classic	Succeeded by 2019 Arnold Strongman Classic
