= 2015 World's Strongest Man =

Strongman competition in 2015

Competition information
- Dates: 19–26 April 2015
- Venue: Palace of Justice
- Location: Putrajaya
- Country: Malaysia
- Athletes participating: 30
- Nations participating: 14

Champion(s)
- (United States) Brian Shaw

The 2015 World's Strongest Man was the 38th edition of the World's Strongest Man competition. It took place in Putrajaya, Malaysia from April 19 to 26. The competition was won by Brian Shaw of the United States for the third time, with defending champion Žydrūnas Savickas of Lithuania second and Hafþór Júlíus Björnsson of Iceland third.

== Participants ==
- Brian Shaw (United States)
- Jean-François Caron (Canada)
- Martin Forsmark (Sweden)
- Robert Oberst (United States)
- Adam Bishop (United Kingdom)
- Mateusz Baron (Poland)
- Hafþór Júlíus Björnsson (Iceland)
- Dimitar Savatinov (Bulgaria)
- Rafal Kobylarz (Poland)
- Josh Thigpen (United States)
- Akos Nagy (Hungary)
- Graham Hicks (United Kingdom)
- Žydrūnas Savickas (Lithuania)
- Mikhail Shivlyakov (Russia)
- Nick Best (United States)
- David Nyström (Sweden)
- Benedikt Magnússon (Iceland)
- Laurence Shahlaei (United Kingdom)
- Mark Felix (United Kingdom)
- Jerry Pritchett (United States)
- Dainis Zageris (Latvia)
- Krzysztof Radzikowski (Poland)
- Alexander Lysenko (Russia)
- Gerhard Van Staden (South Africa)
- Mike Burke (United States)
- Eddie Hall (United Kingdom)
- Matjaž Belšak (Slovenia)
- Grzegorz Szymanski (Poland)
- Mike Caruso (United States)
- Ole Martin Hansen (Norway)

== Heat Results ==
Each qualifying heat consisted of six competitors and six events. Unlike previous years, the final heats event, the Atlas Stones, was worth double points. After the six events, the top two competitors from each heat will qualify for the final.

=== Heat 1 ===
#	Name	Nationality	Pts
1	Brian Shaw	United States	36.5
2	Jean-François Caron	Canada	33
3	Martin Forsmark	Sweden	26.5
4	Robert Oberst	United States	20.5
5	Adam Bishop	United Kingdom	16
6	Mateusz Baron	Poland	10.5 (Inj)

=== Heat 2 ===
#	Name	Nationality	Pts
1	Hafþór Júlíus Björnsson	Iceland	38
2	Dimitar Savatinov	Bulgaria	31
3	Rafal Kobylarz	Poland	26
4	Josh Thigpen	United States	19
5	Akos Nagy	Hungary	17
6	Graham Hicks	United Kingdom	8 (Inj)

=== Heat 3 ===
#	Name	Nationality	Pts
1	Žydrūnas Savickas	Lithuania	40
2	Mikhail Shivlyakov	Russia	28
3	Nick Best	United States	24
4	David Nyström	Sweden	19
5	Benedikt Magnússon	Iceland	9 (Inj)
6	Laurence Shahlaei	United Kingdom	8 (Inj)

=== Heat 4 ===
#	Name	Nationality	Pts
1	Mark Felix	United Kingdom	31
2	Jerry Pritchett	United States	27.5
3	Dainis Zageris	Latvia	25.5
4	Krzysztof Radzikowski	Poland	25
5	Alexander Lysenko	Russia	21
6	Gerhard Van Staden	South Africa	15

=== Heat 5 ===
#	Name	Nationality	Pts
1	Mike Burke	United States	37
2	Eddie Hall	United Kingdom	34
3	Matjaž Belšak	Slovenia	27.5
4	Grzegorz Szymanski	Poland	26
5	Mike Caruso	United States	12.5
6	Ole Martin Hansen	Norway	9

== Finals Events Results ==
=== Event 1: Super Yoke ===
- Weight: 499 kilograms (1,100 lb)
- Course Length: 20 metres (66 ft)
- Time Limit: 60 seconds

#	Name	Nationality	Time	Event Pts	Overall Pts
1	Hafþór Júlíus Björnsson	Iceland	0m 17.09	10	10
2	Brian Shaw	United States	0m 18.82	9	9
3	Žydrūnas Savickas	Lithuania	0m 24.84	8	8
4	Eddie Hall	United Kingdom	0m 27.28	7	7
5	Mike Burke	United States	0m 30.74	6	6
6	Jean-François Caron	Canada	0m 39.02	5	5
7	Dimitar Savatinov	Bulgaria	DNF 19.1 metres (63 ft)	4	4
8	Mark Felix	United Kingdom	DNF 15.8 metres (52 ft)	3	3
9	Jerry Pritchett	United States	DNF 8.9 metres (29 ft)	2	2
10	Mikhail Shivlyakov	Russia	DNF 3.8 metres (12 ft)	1	1

=== Event 2: Deadlift ===
- Weight: 369 kilograms (814 lb) for repetitions
- Time Limit: 60 seconds

#	Name	Nationality	Repetitions	Event Pts	Overall Pts
1	Brian Shaw	United States	8	10	19
2	Eddie Hall	United Kingdom	7	9	16
3	Hafþór Júlíus Björnsson	Iceland	6	8	18
4	Žydrūnas Savickas	Lithuania	5	6.5	14.5
4	Jean-François Caron	Canada	5	6.5	11.5
6	Jerry Pritchett	United States	3	4.5	6.5
6	Mark Felix	United Kingdom	3	4.5	7.5
8	Mike Burke	United States	1	2.5	8.5
8	Dimitar Savatinov	Bulgaria	1	2.5	6.5
10	Mikhail Shivlyakov	Russia	0	0	1

=== Event 3: Truck Pull ===
- Weight: 28,000 kilograms (62,000 lb)
- Course Length: 25 metres (82 ft)
- Time Limit: 60 seconds
- None of the athletes completed the full course

#	Name	Nationality	Distance	Event Pts	Overall Pts
1	Brian Shaw	United States	23.84 metres (78.2 ft)	10	29
2	Žydrūnas Savickas	Lithuania	22.88 metres (75.1 ft)	9	23.5
3	Hafþór Júlíus Björnsson	Iceland	20.83 metres (68.3 ft)	8	26
4	Eddie Hall	United Kingdom	20.25 metres (66.4 ft)	7	23
5	Mike Burke	United States	20.09 metres (65.9 ft)	6	14.5
6	Jean-François Caron	Canada	17.82 metres (58.5 ft)	5	16.5
7	Mikhail Shivlyakov	Russia	16.05 metres (52.7 ft)	4	5
8	Dimitar Savatinov	Bulgaria	15.85 metres (52.0 ft)	3	9.5
9	Mark Felix	United Kingdom	15.72 metres (51.6 ft)	2	9.5
10	Jerry Pritchett	United States	13.08 metres (42.9 ft)	1	7.5

=== Event 4: Power Stairs ===
- Weight: Three weights at 225 kilograms (496 lb) each
- Time Limit: 60 seconds
- Each weight must be carried up 5 steps

#	Name	Nationality	Time	Event Pts	Overall Pts
1	Žydrūnas Savickas	Lithuania	0m 33.97	10	33.5
2	Hafþór Júlíus Björnsson	Iceland	0m 35.37	9	35
3	Brian Shaw	United States	0m 37.81	8	37
4	Mike Burke	United States	0m 40.68	7	21.5
5	Jean-François Caron	Canada	DNF (14 steps)	6	22.5
6	Eddie Hall	United Kingdom	DNF (13 steps)	5	28
7	Mark Felix	United Kingdom	DNF (10 steps)	4	13.5
8	Mikhail Shivlyakov	Russia	DNF (9 steps)	2.5	7.5
8	Jerry Pritchett	United States	DNF (9 steps)	2.5	10
10	Dimitar Savatinov	Bulgaria	DNF (1 step)	1	10.5

=== Event 5: Max Log Press ===
- Opening Weight: 165 kilograms (364 lb)

#	Name	Nationality	Weight Lifted	Event Pts	Overall Pts
1	Žydrūnas Savickas (Note: Savickas attempted a 227.5 kg (502 lb) log that would've been a new world record at the time, but failed.)	Lithuania	205 kilograms (452 lb)	10	43.5
2	Dimitar Savatinov	Bulgaria	195 kilograms (430 lb)	8.5	19
2	Eddie Hall	United Kingdom	195 kilograms (430 lb)	8.5	36.5
4	Brian Shaw	United States	180 kilograms (400 lb)	6	43
4	Mike Burke	United States	180 kilograms (400 lb)	6	27.5
4	Hafþór Júlíus Björnsson	Iceland	180 kilograms (400 lb)	6	41
7	Jean-François Caron	Canada	165 kilograms (364 lb)	3.5	26
7	Mikhail Shivlyakov	Russia	165 kilograms (364 lb)	3.5	11
9	Jerry Pritchett	United States	-	0	10
9	Mark Felix	United Kingdom	-	0	13.5

=== Event 6: Atlas Stones ===
- Weight: 5 stones ranging from 150–209 kilograms (331–461 lb)
- Time Limit: 60 seconds

#	Name	Nationality	Time	Event Pts	Overall Pts
1	Brian Shaw	United States	5 in 0m 24.51	10	53
2	Eddie Hall	United Kingdom	5 in 0m 24.84	9	45.5
3	Hafþór Júlíus Björnsson	Iceland	5 in 0m 31.73	8	49
4	Mike Burke	United States	5 in 0m 50.23	7	34.5
5	Žydrūnas Savickas	Lithuania	4 in 0m 21.32	6	49.5
6	Jean-François Caron	Canada	3 in 0m 17.85	5	31
7	Mark Felix	United Kingdom	3 in 0m 22.72	4	17.5
8	Dimitar Savatinov	Bulgaria	2 in 0m 18.20	3	22
9	Mikhail Shivlyakov	Russia	2 in 0m 22.80	2	13
10	Jerry Pritchett	United States	0	1	11

== Final standings ==
#	Name	Nationality	Pts
1st place, gold medalist(s)	Brian Shaw	United States	53
2nd place, silver medalist(s)	Žydrūnas Savickas	Lithuania	49.5
3rd place, bronze medalist(s)	Hafþór Júlíus Björnsson	Iceland	49
4	Eddie Hall	United Kingdom	45.5
5	Mike Burke	United States	34.5
6	Jean-François Caron	Canada	31
7	Dimitar Savatinov	Bulgaria	22
8	Mark Felix	United Kingdom	17.5
9	Mikhail Shivlyakov	Russia	13
10	Jerry Pritchett	United States	11 (Injured)

Preceded by 2014 World's Strongest Man	2015 World's Strongest Man	Succeeded by 2016 World's Strongest Man
