= Mark Felix =

British strength athlete

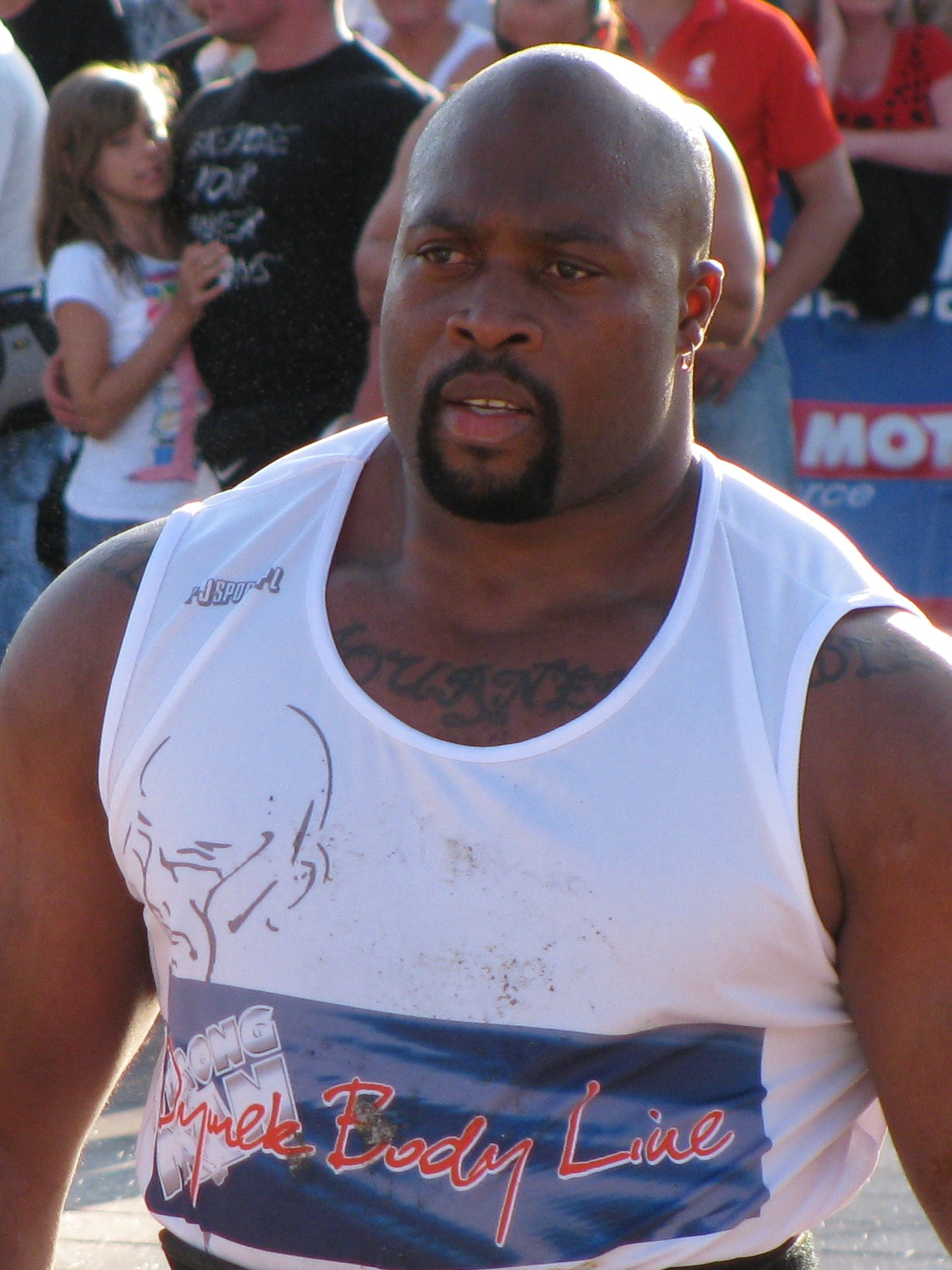

Personal information
- Nickname: The Miracle Man
- Born: 17 April 1966 (age 60) St. George's, Grenada
- Height: 6 ft 4 in (1.93 m)
- Weight: 140 kg (310 lb)

Sport
- Sport: Strongman
Medal record
Strongman
Representing United Kingdom England France and Grenada
World's Strongest Man
Qualified	2004 World's Strongest Man
4th	2006 World's Strongest Man
7th	2007 World's Strongest Man
Qualified	2008 World's Strongest Man
Qualified	2009 World's Strongest Man
Qualified	2010 World's Strongest Man
Qualified	2011 World's Strongest Man
Qualified	2013 World's Strongest Man
Qualified	2014 World's Strongest Man
8th	2015 World's Strongest Man
Qualified	2016 World's Strongest Man
Qualified	2017 World's Strongest Man
Qualified	2018 World's Strongest Man
Qualified	2019 World's Strongest Man
Qualified	2020 World's Strongest Man
Qualified	2021 World's Strongest Man
Qualified	2022 World's Strongest Man
Qualified	2023 World's Strongest Man
Arnold Strongman Classic
6th	2011 Arnold Strongman Classic
6th	2013 Arnold Strongman Classic
Europe's Strongest Man
4th	2008 Europe's Strongest Man
3rd	2010 Europe's Strongest Man
3rd	2015 Europe's Strongest Man
7th	2016 Europe's Strongest Man
5th	2017 Europe's Strongest Man
8th	2018 Europe's Strongest Man
7th	2019 Europe's Strongest Man
7th	2020 Europe's Strongest Man
Giants Live
2nd	2009 Poland
3rd	2010 London
4th	2011 London
3rd	2011 Ukraine
8th	2019 Wembley
10th	2021 Strongman Classic
5th	2021 Arnold UK
10th	2022 Strongman Classic
World Strongman Federation
7th	2012 WSF World Cup Abu Dhabi
3rd	2012 WSF World Cup Uzbekistan
1st	2016 WSF World Cup India
WSM Super Series
3rd	2007 Mohegan Sun Grand Prix
Jón Páll Sigmarsson Classic
3rd	2010
2nd	2012
All-American Strongman Challenge
2nd	2010
3rd	2011
8th	2012
Ultimate Strongman Masters
2nd	2018
5th	2019
Rolling Thunder
Champion	2008
Champion	2009
Vice Grip Viking Challenge
Champion	2011
Champion	2012
World's Strongest Team
3rd	2005
2nd	2015
South Africa's Strongest Man
2nd	2016
UK's Strongest Man
2nd	2020
Britain's Strongest Man
1st	2005 (IFSA)
2nd	2006
2nd	2007
3rd	2008
3rd	2009
2nd	2015
2nd	2016
5th	2017
7th	2018
8th	2019
8th	2020
6th	2021
8th	2022
England's Strongest Man
3rd	2004
2nd	2005 (IFSA)
Africa's Strongest Man
2nd	2016

Mark Felix (born 17 April 1966) is a Grenadian-English-French retired strongman competitor.

He is most noted for winning 2015 Ultimate Strongman Masters World Championships, 2016 WSF World Cup India and four acclaimed international grip contests: the Rolling Thunder World Championships in 2008 and 2009, and Vice Grip Viking Challenge in 2011 and 2012. Having competed in over 100 international competitions, he was invited to the World's Strongest Man competition on eighteen occasions, where he managed to qualify to the finals on three of those, winning fourth place in 2006.

He has been affectionately called "The Miracle Man" due to his grip strength and deadlifting skills displayed even into his late fifties.

== Early life ==
Felix was born in 1966 in St. George's, Grenada. At the age of 23, he moved to Rishton, Lancashire, England.

He was a dedicated bodybuilder and turned his attention to strongman competitions in 2003 at the age of 37, comparatively late in relation to other strength athletes. Felix also works as a plasterer, with his strength training done four evenings a week.

== Strongman career ==
Felix turned pro as a strongman within a year when the IFSA Strongman Federation was launched in 2004. He came third in England's Strongest Man in 2004, and in 2005 went on to come second to Eddy Elwood in the IFSA version of England's Strongest Man. This led him to the IFSA British Championships, which he won in 2005. Of the five events, Felix won three (Deadlift, Farmer's Walk and Atlas Stones). Afterwards, Felix credited his victory to "Big hands, big heart".

In 2005, Felix was invited to compete in the IFSA World Open in Sao Paulo, Brazil which was a qualifier for the 2005 IFSA Strongman World Championships later in the year, but he failed to finish in the top four and did not qualify for the IFSA World Championships. Felix also competed in the IFSA World Team Championships in 2005 as a part of 'Team World' representing Grenada, where the team placed third overall.

In 2006, Felix placed second in the Britain's Strongest Man competition and this led to a place in the 2006 World's Strongest Man, where he placed fourth in the finals.

In 2007, he repeated his second-place finish in Britain's Strongest Man and finished seventh in the 2007 World's Strongest Man. In the same year, he also finished third in the Strongman Super Series Mohegan Sun Grand Prix.

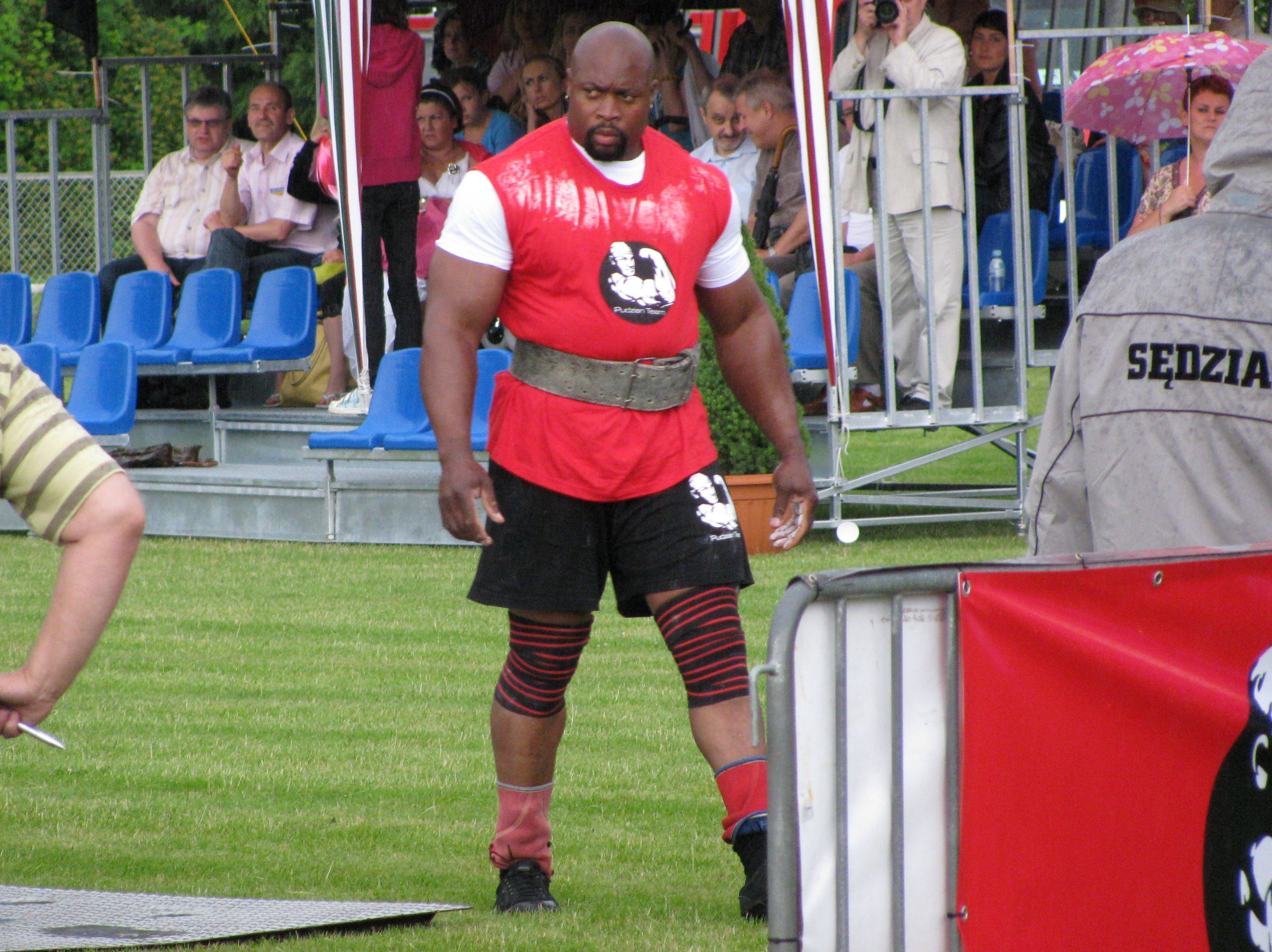
Felix at 2009 Europe's Strongest Man.

In 2008, he came fourth in Europe's Strongest Man and went on to finish third in Britain's Strongest Man, qualifying him for a third successive WSM appearance. Felix has said, "Every year I gain more experience and learn more about what I am capable of." Felix regularly competed at the Europe's Strongest Man from 2008 to 2020. His highest placings were coming in at 3rd place in the 2010 and 2015 competitions.

Felix was also a perennial contender in Britain's Strongest Man competition, coming in 3rd place two times (2008 and 2013) and 2nd place four times (2006, 2007, 2015 and 2016).

In 2010, Felix placed 3rd behind champion Brian Shaw and in 2012, 2nd behind champion Hafþór Júlíus Björnsson at the highly acclaimed Jón Páll Sigmarsson Classic held in Reykjavík, Iceland.

At 2011 Giants Live London, Felix shared the world record for the heaviest strongman style Deadlift with Brian Shaw, Laurence Shahlaei and Terry Hollands when they all pulled 412.5 kg (909 lb). He then increased it to 420 kg (926 lb) and shared the record with Shaw and Shahlaei, but the two of them again raised it to 430 kg (948 lb). However, unlike Shaw, Shahlaei and Hollands who performed their lifts without a suit, Felix wore a multi-ply deadlift suit for all of his attempts.

In 2011 and 2013, Felix was selected for the Arnold Strongman Classic, which is widely regarded as the heaviest and the most difficult strongman competition in the world. In 2011, he loaded a 243 kg (536 lb) Manhood Stone (Max Atlas Stone) over a 4 ft bar and secured a sixth place finish. In 2013, he loaded a 205 kg (452 lb) Atlas Stone 4 times over a 4 ft bar and shared the world record with Brian Shaw for the heaviest Hummer Tire Deadlift performed from 15 inches off the floor at 509 kg (1,122 lb). In a stacked field, he again had to settle for the sixth place.

At the 2015 World's Strongest Team competition held in Stoke-on-Trent, Felix and Eddie Hall (who competed under name 'Team Saxons') emerged 2nd place behind the champions Hafþór Júlíus Björnsson and Matjaz Belsak (Team Vikings).

In 2016, Felix won World Strongman Federation World Cup held in Varanasi, India, which his first and only international competition win to-date. Even though he also won 2005 IFSA British Championships, it contained only English and Scottish athletes.

In 2023, Felix became the oldest competitor ever in the 2023 World's Strongest Man at 57 years old, in what would also be his final World's Strongest Man appearance. The record was previously held by Odd Haugen, who participated at the 2006 World's Strongest Man at the age of 56. Felix in 2023 also broke the record for the most World's Strongest Man entries at 18 times, while reaching the finals three times in 2006, 2007 and 2015. The fourth place in 2006 remains his best performance at World's Strongest Man.

A new award, the Knaack Tools of the Strongman Award, was also awarded to both Felix and Brian Shaw at 2023 World's Strongest Man. The award was voted by the athletes to recognize the hardest working athlete in the year's competition.

After his final World's Strongest Man appearance, Felix participated in three more competitions before officially retiring from international competition following the 2024 England's Strongest Man competition. Felix remains active in the masters class in strongman, having won three consecutive Masters (50+) World's Strongest Man titles from 2022 to 2024.

== Grip career ==
With his very large hands and a reported hand span of 13 inches, Felix is noted for his exceptional grip strength.

He won the inaugural 2008 Rolling Thunder World Championships which took place at 2008 Fortissimus contest in Canada. He also set a new world record in Rolling Thunder with a lift of 301 lb (136.5 kg) which ultimately went on to become the final record with the V1. In 2009, Felix successfully defended his Rolling Thunder World Championships title.

In 2011, Felix won the inaugural Vice Grip Viking Challenge which took place in January at the LA Fit Expo. He also performed a 485 lb (220 kg) double overhand axle deadlift. Felix retained his Vice Grip title by winning the 2012 Vice Grip Viking Challenge. He also set a world record in the Captains of Crush "COC" Silver Bullet event (holding a suspended weight from within the handles of a Captains of Crush no. 3 gripper) with a time of 43.25 seconds.

In 2012, Felix set a new Rolling Thunder world record at the 2012 Bodypower Expo in Birmingham, England with a lift of 323.5 lb (146.7 kg), more than 20 lbs. heavier than his previous world record. However, this was identified with being performed on a flawed V2 handle which resembled the same error V1 had, hence was nullified upon introduction of V3.

In 2019, Felix set a new world record in the Hercules Hold event with 160kg in each hand at Giants Live World Tour Finals with a time of 87.52 seconds. In 2020 Europe's Strongest Man he surpassed his record with a performance of 92.37 seconds.

In 2020, Felix set a new world record in the Rogue replica Dinnie Stones hold during 2020 Rogue record breakers at Arnold Strongman Classic with a time of 31.40 seconds.

== Personal records ==
During competitions

- Pillars of Hercules (Hercules hold) – 200 kg (441 lb) in each hand for 103.81 seconds (2026 Strongman World Tour Finals) (World Record)

→ Felix also held the former world records when he held the Hercules pillars for 82.26 seconds at 2019 Europe's Strongest Man, 87.52 seconds at 2019 Giants Live World Tour Finals, and 92.37 seconds at 2020 Europe's Strongest Man.

- IronMind Rolling Thunder (V1) – 136.5 kg (301 lb) (2008 Mohegan Sun Grand Prix) (former world record)

→ After 15 years since its inception in 1993, Felix became the first man ever to break the 300lb barrier with Rolling Thunder V1. However, V1 was discontinued following this performance because it was observed that the expected rotation of the handle was not happening anymore at that weight. Yet, it remains the final world record with V1.

- IronMind Rolling Thunder (V2) – 146.7 kg (323.4 lb) (2012 Bodypower Expo) (former world record)

→ However, this was identified with being performed on a flawed V2 handle which resembled the same error V1 had, hence was nullified upon introduction of V3. This lift with V2 was not beaten until 2013 when Alexey Tyukalov did 150.5 kg (331.8 lb).
Please see: Progression of the Rolling Thunder world record.

- Double overhand Apollons Axle deadlift – 227 kg (500 lb) (2016 Ultimate Strongman Masters)
- Double Thomas Inch Dumbbells farmers walk – 78 kg (172 lb) in each hand for 39.03 metres (128 ft 1 in) (2024 Man Beast Strongman Events) (World Record)
- Rogue replica Dinnie Stones hold – 333 kg (734 lb) for 31.40 seconds (2020 Rogue record breakers) (former world record)
- Equipped Deadlift (with suit and straps) – 420 kg (926 lb) (2011 Giants Live London and 2016 World Deadlift Championships) [has achieved this feat twice]
- Hummer tire deadlift (with straps) (15 inches off the floor) – 509 kg (1,122 lb) (2013 Arnold Strongman Classic)
- Silver dollar deadlift (with straps) (18 inches off the floor) – 515 kg (1,135 lb) (2021 UK's Strongest Man)
- Elevated axle bar deadlift (for reps) (18 inches off the floor) – 400 kg (882 lb) x 13 reps (2009 Fortissimus) (World Record)
- Car deadlift (side handles – from 15 inches) (for reps) – 380 kg (838 lb) x 16 reps (2013 Europe's Strongest Man) (World Record)
- Deadlift static hold (no straps) – 330 kg (728 lb) for 58.00 seconds (2008 Strongman Super Series Mohegan Sun Grand Prix) (World Record)
- Wrecking ball hold (no straps) – 228 kg (503 lb) for 140.49 seconds (2022 World's Strongest Man, group 2) (World Record)
- Manhood Stone (Max Atlas Stone) – 243 kg (536 lb) over 4 ft bar (2011 Arnold Strongman Classic)

During training

- Captains of Crush – No.3 gripper (127 kg (280 lb) / RGC 67.1 kg (148 lb) of pressure)
- Squat (raw) – 350 kg (770 lb)
- Bench press (raw) – 240 kg (530 lb)
- Deadlift (raw)/ without wrist straps) – 405 kg (893 lb)
