= Eddie Hall =

British retired strongman (born 1988)

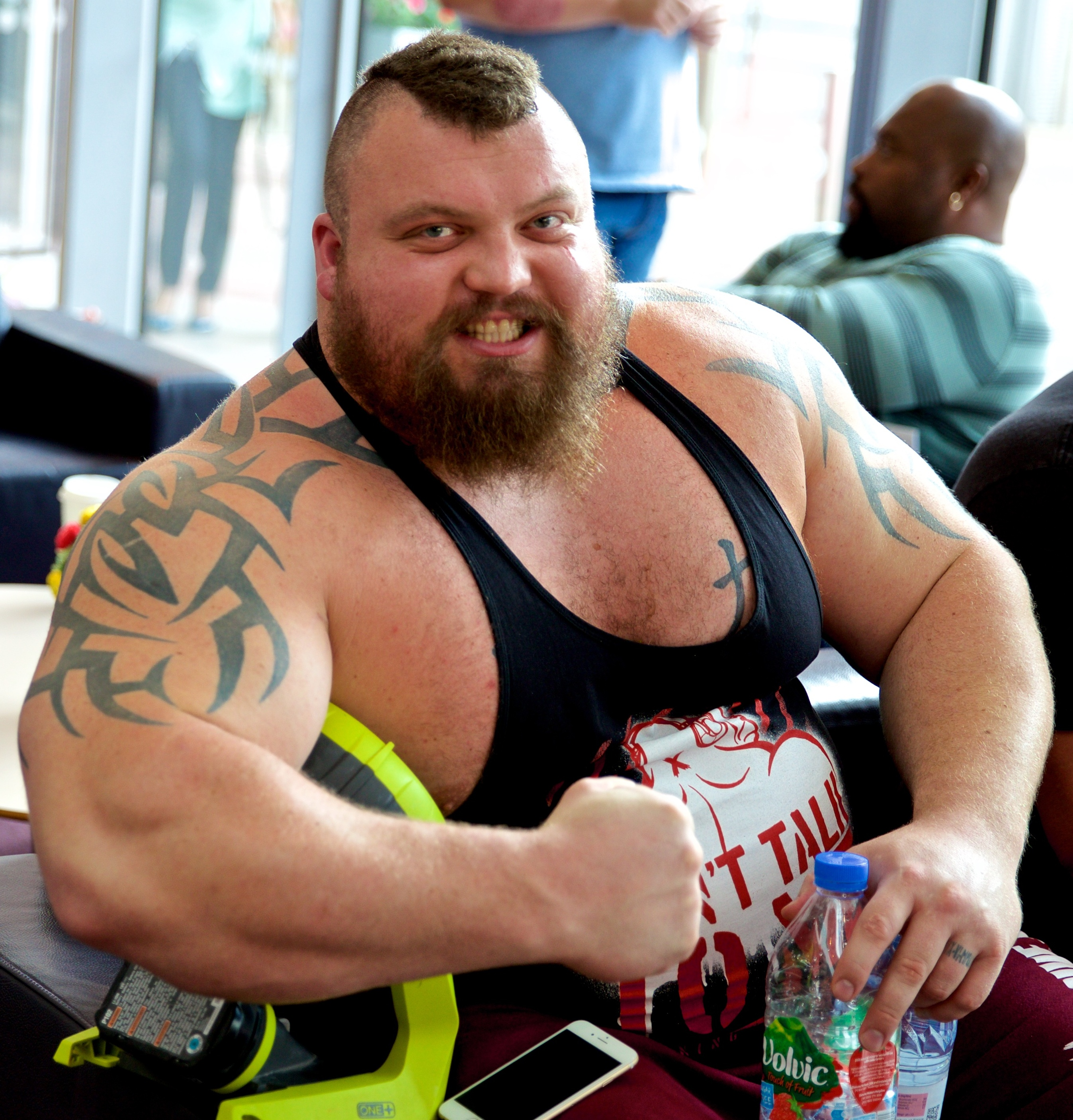
- Hall in 2016

Personal information
- Nickname: The Beast
- Born: Edward Stephen Hall; 15 January 1988 (age 38) Newcastle-under-Lyme, England
- Occupations: Media personality; strongman
- Height: 6 ft 2 in (188 cm)
- Weight: 142–196.5 kg (313–433 lb)
- Spouse: Alexandra Hall
- Children: 4

YouTube information
- Channel: Eddie Hall The Beast
- Years active: 2011–present
- Genre: Strength Training/Strongman
- Subscribers: 3.5 million
- Views: 603.13 million
- Last updated: 5 October 2026

Sport
- Sport: Strongman
Medal record
Representing United Kingdom
World's Strongest Man
Qualified	2012 World's Strongest Man
Qualified	2013 World's Strongest Man
6th	2014 World's Strongest Man
4th	2015 World's Strongest Man
3rd	2016 World's Strongest Man
1st	2017 World's Strongest Man
Arnold Strongman Classic
6th	2015 Arnold Strongman Classic
9th	2016 Arnold Strongman Classic
Europe's Strongest Man
7th	2012 Europe's Strongest Man
8th	2013 Europe's Strongest Man
7th	2014 Europe's Strongest Man
9th	2015 Europe's Strongest Man
2nd	2017 Europe's Strongest Man
Giants Live
4th	2012 FitX Melbourne
2nd	2013 Hungary
12th	2013 British Open
3rd	2014 Hungary
10th	2017 World Tour Finals
Arnold Pro Strongman World Series
4th	2015 Australia
Strongman Champions League
4th	2014 SCL Fibo Germany
2nd	2014 SCL World Finals
Ultimate Strongman Championships
10th	2012 Ultimate Strongman
12th	2016 Ultimate Strongman
Battle of the North
1st	2015 Battle of the North
Super Series Challenge Trophy
11th	2013 Super Series
9th	2015 Toyota Cup
Grand Prix Super Series
13th	2012 Gateshead Grand Prix
Winter Strongman Challenge
1st	2015 Winter Strongman Challenge
Representing England
UK's Strongest Man
1st	2011 UK's Strongest Man
1st	2012 UK's Strongest Man
1st	2013 UK's Strongest Man
1st	2014 UK's Strongest Man
1st	2015 UK's Strongest Man
1st	2016 UK's Strongest Man
Britain's Strongest Man
8th	2012 Britain's Strongest Man
12th	2013 Britain's Strongest Man
1st	2014 Britain's Strongest Man
1st	2015 Britain's Strongest Man
1st	2016 Britain's Strongest Man
1st	2017 Britain's Strongest Man
1st	2018 Britain's Strongest Man
England's Strongest Man
1st	2010 England's Strongest Man
1st	2011 England's Strongest Man

Edward Stephen Hall (born 15 January 1988) is a British retired strongman competitor. He is best known for being the first man to deadlift 500 kg (1,102 lb), setting a then-world record, and for winning the 2017 World's Strongest Man competition. He has also won national competitions such as England's Strongest Man, Britain's Strongest Man, and UK's Strongest Man multiple times in the national circuit.

Venturing into other sports, in 2022, he was defeated by Hafþór Júlíus Björnsson in boxing, and in 2024, was defeated by Brian Shaw in arm wrestling. In 2025, he defeated Mariusz Pudzianowski in mixed martial arts.

In 2025, he launched his own podcast titled The Good, the Bad and The Beast, interviewing various strongman athletes and other athletes.

== Early life ==
Hall was born in Newcastle-under-Lyme, in Staffordshire, England on 15 January 1988. As a teenager, he was a competitive swimmer in his age group; having competed in the UK Nationals swimming competition in 2001, winning four gold medals and one silver while setting two British records. He attended Clayton Hall Academy, but was expelled at the age of 15 and began homeschooling. At the age of 16, he began an apprenticeship as a technician at Lex Commercials, the local DAF Trucks site in Stoke-on-Trent. Upon completion of his apprenticeship in 2008, he began working as a mechanic and technician at the Robert Wiseman Dairies site in Market Drayton until 2016.

== Athletic career ==
=== Strongman ===
In 2007, Hall entered his first hometown strongman competition, where he achieved a 5th-place finish. A 3rd-place podium finish during a regional strongman competition in 2009 secured Hall an invitation to that year's official England's Strongest Man qualifier, where he narrowly missed qualification.

In 2010, after replacing an injured Dave Meer of Tamworth at that year's England's Strongest Man championships, Hall secured his first competition win. He achieved another competition win at UK's Strongest Man 2011 competition in Belfast, with Ken Nowicki in second and Rich Smith in third. During the competition, Hall set a new national record in the Viking Hold, holding on to 20 kg (44lbs) axes in each hand at full stretch for one minute and 18 seconds. Although sustaining a minor tendon injury during the competition, Hall remained hopeful about receiving an invitation to that year's World's Strongest Man (WSM) competition, to be held in September. His improved results, however, would only secure an invitation to the following year's World's Strongest Man contest.

Winning the UK title meant that Hall became the first choice to replace Jono MacFarlane of New Zealand in the Giants Live Melbourne event in February 2012, when the latter suffered a back injury. He placed fourth. Later, in April 2012, he was invited to compete at Europe's Strongest Man at Headingley Carnegie Stadium. He finished in seventh place. Also in 2012, Hall competed at the World's Strongest Man competition for the first time, but did not progress beyond his qualifying group, which contained Hafþór Júlíus Björnsson and Mike Jenkins, who qualified for the finals. He competed furthermore across international shows and emerged tenth at Ultimate Strongman series and thirteenth at Gateshead Grand Prix.

In 2013, Hall failed to qualify for Europe's Strongest Man. However, he was given a second chance when Ervin Katona was forced to retire due to injury. Hall competed in his place and came in eighth place. The same year, he placed eleventh at Super Series and was featured on BBC One's Watchdog series when the producers enlisted his help to test the strongest of drivers in specific circumstances. He also competed at that year's World's Strongest Man, winning two events in his heat but narrowly missing out on qualifying for the final. He also placed twelfth at 2013 Giants Live British Open.

In 2014, Hall reached the final of WSM for the first time, coming second in the squat lift and finishing sixth, in one of the most stacked lineups on competitions history which consisted of Žydrūnas Savickas, Hafþór Júlíus Björnsson and Brian Shaw in the podium. He also placed fourth at 2014 SCL FIBO and third at Giants Live Hungary behind Jason Bergmann and Matjaz Belsak. In Europe's Strongest Man and SCL World Finals, he finished seventh and second respectively and both competitions were won by Hafþór Júlíus Björnsson.

In 2015 he entered a competition called Winter Strongman Challenge in Dartford, England which was escalated to an international competition and eventually won it. After placing sixth and fourth in the Arnold Strongman Classic and Arnold Australia, he finished fourth at the World's Strongest Man behind Shaw, Savickas and Björnsson. Also in 2015, Hall surpassed Benedikt Magnússon's deadlift world record with a lift of 462 kg (1,019 lb) in a lowered down deadlift suit and with lifting straps. He placed ninth at Europe's Strongest Man, tenth in Toyota cup and won Battle of the North competition held in Faroe Islands. In December, a feature documentary about Hall called Eddie: Strongman was released. The film, directed by Matt Bell, follows Hall for two years as he strives to become the strongest man in the world.

In the 2016 Arnold Strongman Classic, Hall achieved a new world record in the Elephant bar deadlift by grinding 465 kg (1,025 lb) which eventually made him withdraw from the rest of the competition. He then finished third at the World's Strongest Man behind Shaw and Björnsson. In July 2016 Hall broke the deadlift world record under strongman rules (standard bar with figure 8 straps and multi-ply suit) by lifting 500 kg (1,102 lb) at the World Deadlift Championships besting the world record 465 kg (1,025 lb) he previously shared with Jerry Pritchett and Benedikt Magnússon earlier that same day. The 500 kg lift made Hall bleed from his ears and nostrils, and made him temporarily blind before he fainted to the floor. The record stood for 3 years and 9 months until May 2020, when it was beaten by Hafþór Júlíus Björnsson, who deadlifted 501 kg (1,105 lb) at the World's Ultimate Strongman Feats of Strength series. Hall heavily disputed the legitimacy of the lift as it took place in his home gym. However, Björnsson returned and first deadlifted 505 kg (1,113 lb) at the 2025 Eisenhart Black Deadlift Championships in Germany, and 6 weeks later, speed repped 510 kg (1,124 lb) at the 2025 World Deadlift Championships in England, silencing Hall. He finished the 2016 calendar year by participating at Ultimate Strongman World Championships organized by Glenn Ross and finishing in twelfth place.

In 2017 Europe's Strongest Man, Hall finished second behind Hafþór Júlíus Björnsson after a close battle and won Britain's Strongest Man in the national circuit. He then won 2017 World's Strongest Man 1 point ahead of Björnsson, achieving his first and only major win. However, five years later in 2022, the circumstances under this win became notorious after Luke Stoltman's private conversation with World's Ultimate Strongman director Mark Boyd was released to the public, which indicated that it might have been rigged by Colin Bryce in favour of Eddie. Hall ended 2017 with a tenth place finish at Giants Live World Tour Finals.

In 2018, Hall won his fifth Britain's Strongest Man title and shared first with Hafþór Júlíus Björnsson and Cheick "Iron Biby" Sanou at the 2018 World Log Lift Championships with 213 kg (470 lb) and retired from Strongman due to serious health issues.

== Boxing ==
=== Hall vs. Björnsson ===
Hall started his boxing career in 2020 when his rival Hafþór Júlíus Björnsson challenged him after breaking the deadlift world record. He confidently responded "I'm going to train the hardest, eat the hardest, sleep the hardest and recover the hardest" amidst having boxed before and with his swimming background, claiming superior levels of cardio and endurance. He incorporated a lot of explosive punches, punching boxing machines and many athletes including gymnast Nile Wilson, pop musician Peter Andre, and his training partners as hard as he could. Hall's extensive training regime also incorporated many bench presses, squats, deadlifts, medicine ball slams, and burpees.

On 19 March 2022, Hall faced Björnsson in Dubai, in a titan weight class boxing match which was tag-lined the heaviest match in history. Hall took the better of the first couple rounds and managed to put Björnsson down while knocking him against the ropes at the beginning of the second round, but Björnsson bludgeoned Hall and knocked him down twice to the floor in rounds three and six. Hall sustained bleeding lacerations on top of both eyes and lost by unanimous decision, with all three judges scoring the bout 57–54 in favour of Björnsson. Hall's boxing stance during the fight (especially from the fourth round onwards) garnered a lot of attention because of its uniqueness, having kept distinctly leaning over to the right side mimicking the movement of a fiddler crab, trying to negate the reach and height advantage of Björnsson.

On 20 April 2022, Hall got a tattoo on his foot stating "World's Strongest Man - Hafthor Julius Bjornsson" to commemorate the fight and his loss.

=== Hall vs. Fury ===
On 13 June 2026, Hall faced boxer Tommy Fury at Manchester Arena for a bout themed 'beauty versus beast' which consisted of six two-minute rounds. Despite outweighing the opponent by 49 kg (108 lb), Hall lost by majority decision with the judges scoring 58-56, 59-56 and 57-57 in favour of Fury.

== Mixed martial arts ==
On 7 June 2024, Hall made his MMA debut competing in a 2v1 bout against social media influencers the Neffati brothers (Jamil and Jamel). Hall won the bout, defeating both opponents.

On 26 April 2025 Hall made his professional mixed martial arts debut for KSW facing off against former strongman and mixed martial artist Mariusz Pudzianowski. Hall overwhelmed his opponent and won the bout by TKO within 30 seconds of the first round.

== Arm wrestling ==
On 14 December 2024, Hall lost to Brian Shaw during King Of The Table 13.

== In other media ==
Since his retirement from strongman in 2018, Hall has provided commentary for subsequent competitions. In 2018, Hall appeared on the Channel 5 show Celebs In Solitary, where he attempted to spend five days in solitary confinement. In 2019, Hall presented the SPORTbible webseries Beasted! where he, along with Luke Fullbrook and Chris Peil, helped guide eight men through exercise plans and diets to improve their fitness. Hall is also one of four strongmen, together with Nick Best, Robert Oberst, and Brian Shaw, featured in the History Channel series, The Strongest Man in History where they tried to replicate or surpass historical feats of strength. Hall also had his first acting role as an extra in the action film Expend4bles (2023) and initiated a gameshow titled Battle of the Beasts in Malta. In 2026, Hall participated in the Sidemen's reality television series, inSIDE, where he won £177,894.

== Personal life ==
Hall is married to Alexandra, a barbershop owner in Trent Vale, with whom he has a son named Maximus born in 2013 and two daughters born in June 2023 and October 2024. He also has a daughter named Layla from a previous relationship.

In December 2019, Hall announced he has the Hercules gene, which allows him to build more muscle mass than the average human being.

== Personal records ==
Competitions:

- Deadlift (standard bar with figure 8 straps and multi-ply suit) – 500 kg (1,102 lb) (2016 World Deadlift championships/ Europe's Strongest Man) (former world record)
- Rogue Elephant bar Deadlift (with figure 8 straps and without suit) – 465 kg (1,025 lb) (2016 Arnold Strongman Classic) (former world record)
- Raw Deadlift – 360 kg (794 lb) (without suit or straps) (2013 UK's Strongest Man)
- Deadlift (for reps) – 362.5 kg (799 lb) × 10 reps (multi-ply suit w/ figure 8 straps) (2017 Europe's Strongest Man)
- Circus Barbell Squat (for reps) – 317.5 kg (700 lb) × 15 reps (multi-ply suit w/ wraps) (2017 World's Strongest Man)
- Bench press – 280 kg (617 lb) (raw with elbow sleeves, touch and go) (2015 Eisenhart Challenge)
- Axle press – 216 kg (476 lb) (2017 Europe's Strongest Man) (former world record)
- Log press – 213 kg (470 lb) (2018 Europe's Strongest Man)
- Circus Dumbbell press – 100 kg (220 lb) x 4 reps (2014 Britain's Strongest Man), 124 kg (273 lb) Cyr Dumbbell x 1 rep (2015 Arnold Strongman Classic)
- Keg toss – 6 kegs 18–22.5 kg (40–50 lb) over 4.90 metres (16 ft 1 in) in 60.0 seconds (2014 World's Strongest Man)
- Weight over bar – 25.5 kg (56 lb) over 4.80 metres (15 ft 9 in) (2013 Giants Live Hungary)
- Atlas Stones – 5 Stones (heavy set) 120–200 kg (265–441 lb) in 23.81 seconds (2017 Europe's Strongest Man), 5 Stones (light set) 100–180 kg (220–397 lb) in 17.94 seconds (2016 Britain's Strongest Man)
- Húsafell Stone (replica) – 180 kg (397 lb) for 27.15 metres (89 ft 1 in) (2013 UK's Strongest Man)
- Dinnie Stones (original) – 2 Stones weighing 188 kg (414 lb) & 144.5 kg (319 lb) for 2.09 metres (6 ft 10 in) (2019 Strongest Man in History TV show)
- Bale Tote (Super Yoke) – 680 kg (1,499 lb) for 2.67 metres (8 ft 9 in) (2015 Arnold Strongman Classic)
- CrossFit Isabel – 60 kg (132 lb) for 30 repetitions in 50.9 seconds (2019 CrossFit European Championships) (world record)

Training:

- Deadlift – 450 kg (992 lb) with straps (two man long bar)
- Squat – 405 kg (893 lb) (raw, beltless) (self-claim)
- Long bar Squat (for reps) – 345 kg (761 lb) for 8 reps (beltless, on 8 foot bar)
- Safety bar Squat (for reps) – 350 kg (772 lb) for 6 reps (beltless)
- Equipped Bench press – 300 kg (661 lb)
- Bench press (for reps) – 265 kg (584 lb) for 6 reps (8 foot bar, paused between reps), 225 kg (496 lb) for 10 reps (8 foot bar)
- Incline bench press – 265 kg (584 lb), 225 kg (496 lb) for 7 paused reps
- Incline dumbbell press – 100 kg (220 lb) per hand for 7 reps, 90 kg (198 lb) per hand for 10 reps
- Dumbbell shoulder press – 60 kg (132 lb) per hand for 40 reps

== Competitive strongman record ==
Winning percentage: 9.67%
Podium percentage: 25.80%

	1st	2nd	3rd	Podium	4th	5th	6th	7th	8th	9th	10th	11th	12th	13th	17th	Total
International competitions	3	3	2	8	4	0	2	3	2	3	3	2	2	1	1	31

== Exhibition Boxing record ==
2 fights	0 wins	2 losses
By decision	0	2

No.	Result	Record	Opponent	Type	Round, time	Date	Location	Notes
2	Loss	0–2	Tommy Fury	MD	6	13 Jun 2026	Manchester Arena, Manchester, England	No winner officially declared, though unofficial scorecard read (58–56, 59–56, 57–57) in favour of Fury.
1	Loss	0–1	Hafþór Júlíus Björnsson	UD	6	19 Mar 2022	Aviation Club Tennis Centre, Dubai, U.A.E.	

== Mixed martial arts record ==
Professional record breakdown
1 match	1 win	0 losses
By knockout	1	0

Res.	Record	Opponent	Method	Event	Date	Round	Time	Location	Notes
Win	1–0	(Poland) Mariusz Pudzianowski	TKO (punches)	XTB KSW 105: Bartosiński vs. Grzebyk 2	26 April 2025	1	0:30	Gliwice, Poland	

== Arm wrestling record ==
No.	Result	Record	Opponent	Outcome	Hand	Year	Venue/ event
1	Loss	0–1	(Lithuania) Vytautas Lalas	0-1	Right hand	2020	2020 Europe's Strongest Man
2	Loss	0–2	(United States) Brian Shaw	2-4	Right hand	2024	King Of The Table 13
3	Win	1–2	(United States) Robert Oberst	2-1	Right hand	2025	East vs West

== Filmography ==
Film
Year	Title	Role	Notes	Ref.
2015	Eddie: Strongman	Himself	Documentary film	
2017	Transformers: The Last Knight	Saxon Warrior	Uncredited cameo	
2017	Born Strong	Himself	Documentary film	
2023	Expend4bles	Bartender 2		

Television
Year	Title	Role	Notes	Ref.
2012–2017	World's Strongest Man	Himself (Competitor/Pundit)	14 episodes	
2016	A League of Their Own	Himself	Series 10; Episode 3	
2016	Couples Come Dine with Me	Himself	Series 3; Episode 69	
2018	The Chase	Himself	Series 8; Episode 4	
2018	Celebs In Solitary	Himself	1 series	
2018	Eddie Eats America	Himself	1 series	
2019	The Strongest Man in History	Himself	1 series	
2020	Eddie Eats Christmas	Himself	1 series	
2026	Battle of the Beasts	Himself (Host)		
2026	Inside	Himself (Contestant)	Winner; Series 3	

Web
Year	Title	Role	Notes	Ref.
2020	How to be Behzinga	Himself	Episode: "Behzinga Takes On The London Marathon"	

Video games
Year	Title	Role	Notes	Ref.
2024	Undisputed	Himself		

Achievements
Preceded by Brian Shaw	World's Strongest Man; 2017	Succeeded by Hafþór Júlíus Björnsson
Preceded by Laurence Shahlaei	Britain's Strongest Man; 2014-2018	Succeeded by Graham Hicks
Preceded by Glenn Ross	UK's Strongest Man; 2011–14	Succeeded by Laurence Shahlaei
Preceded by Laurence Shahlaei (Elite/UKSC)	England's Strongest Man (Elite); 2010	Succeeded by Lloyd Renals
Preceded by Dean Slater; Chris Gearing	England's Strongest Man (UKSC); 2011; 2013	Succeeded by Chris Gearing; Ben Kelsey
