= Brian Shaw (strongman) =

American strongman (born 1982)

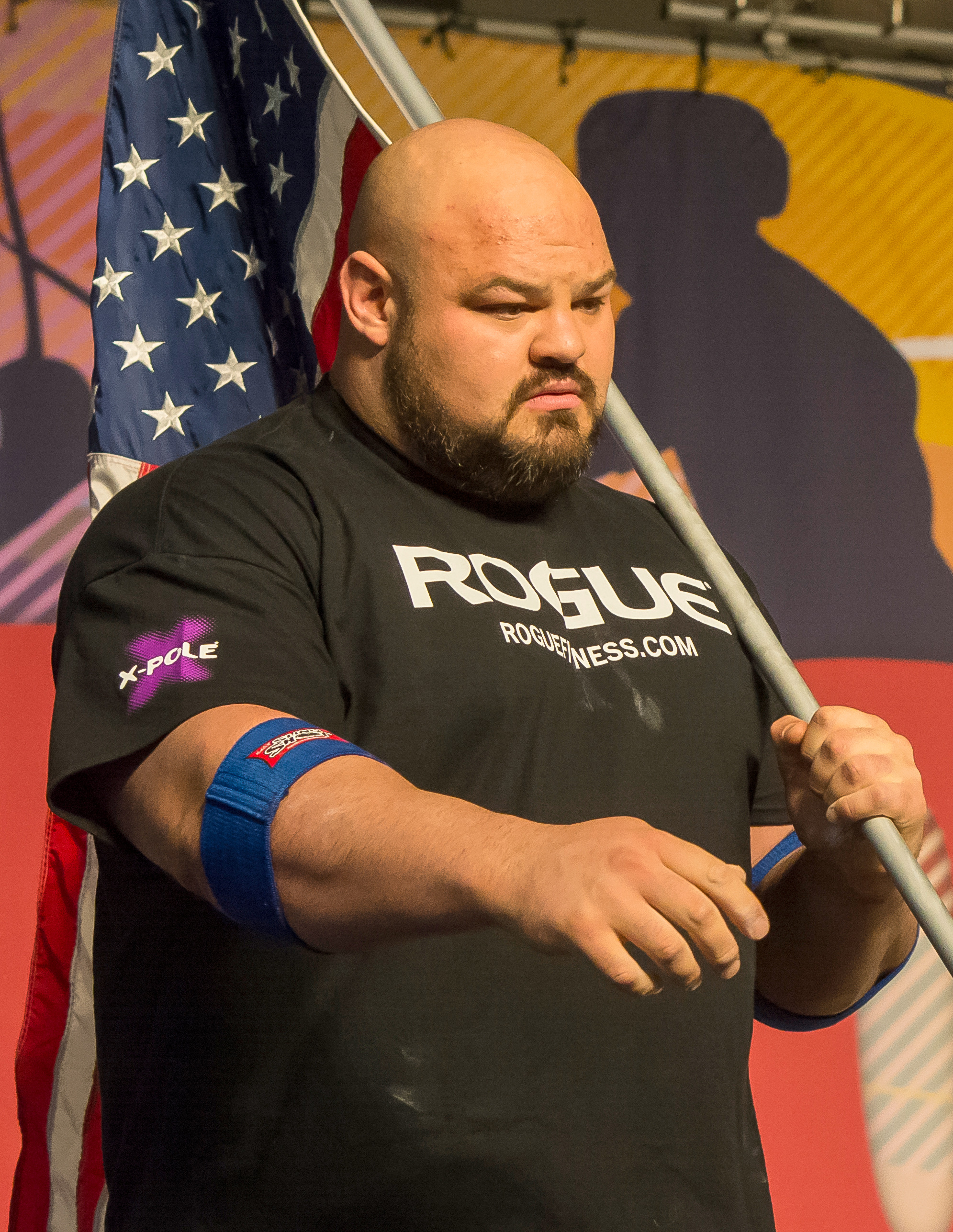
- Shaw at the 2017 Arnold Classic

Personal information
- Nickname: Gigantor
- Born: February 26, 1982 (age 44) Fort Lupton, Colorado, U.S.
- Height: 6 ft 6.75 in (200 cm) to 6 ft 8 in (203 cm)
- Weight: 340–454 lb (154–206 kg)
- Spouse: Keri Jenkins-Shaw (m. 2015)
- Website: shawstrength.com

YouTube information
- Channel: SHAWSTRENGTH
- Years active: 2008–present
- Genre: Strength Training/Strongman
- Subscribers: 2.31 million
- Views: 543.46 million
- Last updated: October 3, 2026

Sport
- Sport: Strongman
Medal record
Representing the United States
World's Strongest Man
Qualified	2008 World's Strongest Man
3rd	2009 World's Strongest Man
2nd	2010 World's Strongest Man
1st	2011 World's Strongest Man
4th	2012 World's Strongest Man
1st	2013 World's Strongest Man
3rd	2014 World's Strongest Man
1st	2015 World's Strongest Man
1st	2016 World's Strongest Man
3rd	2017 World's Strongest Man
3rd	2018 World's Strongest Man
6th	2019 World's Strongest Man
5th	2020 World's Strongest Man
2nd	2021 World's Strongest Man
4th	2022 World's Strongest Man
7th	2023 World's Strongest Man
Arnold Strongman Classic
5th	2010 Arnold Strongman Classic
1st	2011 Arnold Strongman Classic
4th	2012 Arnold Strongman Classic
2nd	2013 Arnold Strongman Classic
2nd	2014 Arnold Strongman Classic
1st	2015 Arnold Strongman Classic
2nd	2016 Arnold Strongman Classic
1st	2017 Arnold Strongman Classic
2nd	2018 Arnold Strongman Classic
8th	2019 Arnold Strongman Classic
Shaw Classic
1st	2020 Shaw Classic
2nd	2021 Shaw Classic
2nd	2022 Shaw Classic
1st	2023 Strongest Man on Earth
Fortissimus
3rd	2009 Fortissimus
World's Ultimate Strongman
2nd	2018 World's Ultimate Strongman
4th	2019 World's Ultimate Strongman
Rogue Invitational
7th	2021 Rogue Invitational
Giants Live
3rd	2009 Mohegan Sun Grand Prix
1st	2010 South Africa
2nd	2010 Istanbul
1st	2011 London
1st	2014 Sweden
Arnold Pro Strongman World Series
1st	2015 Australia
1st	2016 Europe
1st	2017 Australia
1st	2018 Forts de Warwick
7th	2019 Europe
2nd	2020 USA
Strongman Super Series
9th	2007 Venice Beach Grand Prix
7th	2008 Mohegan Sun Grand Prix
1st	2009 Los Angeles Grand Prix
4th	2009 Bucharest Grand Prix
3rd	2009 Mohegan Sun Grand Prix
1st	2009 Gothenburg Grand Prix
1st	2009 Overall Champion
2nd	2010 Mohegan Sun Grand Prix
1st	2010 Viking Power Challenge
1st	2010 Swedish Grand Prix
1st	2010 Overall Champion
Jón Páll Sigmarsson Classic
1st	2010 JPSC
1st	2011 JPSC
Forca Bruta
1st	2015 Forca Bruta
1st	2016 Forca Bruta
SCL North American Championship
1st	2014
All-American Strongman Challenge
2nd	2008 AASC
1st	2009 AASC
North America's Strongest Man
2nd	2007 NASM
1st	2014 NASM
America's Strongest Man
6th	2007 America's Strongest Man
1st	2013 America's Strongest Man
1st	2016 Americas Strongest Man

Brian Shaw (born February 26, 1982) is an American retired professional strongman. He won the 2011, 2013, 2015, and 2016 World's Strongest Man competitions, making him one of only five men to win the World’s Strongest Man four times or more. In addition to winning the Arnold Strongman Classic three times and Shaw Classic two times (with one of them being a 'Strongest Man on Earth' title), he also secured six Strongman Super Series wins, three Giants Live wins and two America's Strongest Man titles. In 2011, Shaw also became the first man to win the World's Strongest Man and the Arnold Strongman Classic in the same calendar year, a feat he replicated in 2015.

With 27 international titles, 30 total wins, 53 podiums and 36 world records he is widely regarded as one of the greatest and most decorated strength athletes of all-time. From 2020 to 2025, Shaw hosted Shaw Classic health and fitness expo, and organized the Strongest Man on Earth competition as its main event during the last three years of the expo.

Upon retirement from Strongman, he turned to Armwrestling where he defeated Eddie Hall in 2024, Brandon Allen in 2025, and lost to Leonidas Arkona in 2026.

In October 2024, Shaw was inducted into the International Sports Hall of Fame.

== Early life ==
Shaw was born in Fort Lupton, Colorado, on February 26, 1982, the son of Jay and Bonnie Shaw. Both of his parents were taller than average, with his father standing at 6 ft 0 in (1.83 m) and his mother 5 ft 11 in (1.80 m). Shaw's mother has also noted that Brian had uncles of exceptional stature on both sides of his family tree.

At Fort Lupton High School, Shaw excelled in basketball. He then attended Otero Junior College in La Junta, Colorado. There, he was able to form an inside combination with current Louisiana State University-Alexandria Head Women's Basketball Coach Bob Austin. Shaw was one of the team leaders for the Rattlers in his sophomore season. Following Otero, he went to Black Hills State University where he was on a full basketball scholarship and received a degree in wellness management.

During his basketball career, Shaw was "hooked on the weights" and he has said that the weight room was his "sanctuary". In his own words, "I've always been able to do this. The biggest tire, the heaviest stone ... I've always been able to walk up and lift it. Odd strength is what it is, not weight-room strength. It's brute strength".

== Career ==
=== 2005–2006 ===
Shaw began his career as a strongman with a win when he entered the Denver's Strongest Man contest in October 2005. He had entered with no formal training. Just seven months later in June 2006, he joined the professional ranks and his successes continued.

=== 2007–2008 ===
Shaw placed sixth in his first America's Strongest Man competition in 2007. A month later he placed ninth at 2007 Venice Beach Grand Prix organized by World Strongman Super Series. At the 2007 North America's Strongest Man competition held in Canada, he emerged runner-up to Jessen Paulin. In 2008, he placed seventh at Mohegan Sun Grand Prix and fourth at Madison Square Garden Grand Prix. In his first World's Strongest Man (WSM) competition, he placed third in his qualifying group which was not adequate to move to the finals.

=== 2009 ===
In 2009, he entered Fortissimus, otherwise known as the Strongest Man on Earth competition, in Canada where he came in third and was the only man to lift six Atlas Stones weighing from 300–425 lb (136–193 kg). He then competed in Romania in the Strongman Super Series. In September, he traveled to his second World's Strongest Man contest in Valletta. There he was grouped in what was termed the "group of death" not least because of his presence in it. Alongside him in this group was Zydrunas Savickas who went on to win the title. Although Savickas won the group, he and Shaw were separated by just two points. In the final, Shaw went on to attain a podium finish, something Randell Strossen of IronMind had predicted would happen when he said "he has to be considered a favorite for a podium position. If he can stay healthy, there's no end to what he could do. He's got these gifts. He's the total package".

=== 2010 ===
Shaw qualified for the finals at the 2010 World's Strongest Man in Sun City, South Africa in September 2010. He was tied for the lead at the end of the finals with Zydrunas Savickas and lost by countback, a system of scoring based on how the athletes placed in each event throughout the finals. Savickas had higher overall placings (2 first places and 1 second place out of 6 events) than Shaw (2 first places and 1 fourth place out of 6 events) and won the 2010 title. Shaw had a costly mistake in the first event of the finals, the Loading Race, failing to secure a third 125 kg sack onto the platform. He fell from a 1st place finish to 3rd place in that event, costing him valuable points against Savickas.

Shaw competed against Savickas again in October 2010 at the Giants Live Istanbul contest. Shaw again finished second behind Savickas.

Shaw won the inaugural Jón Páll Sigmarsson Classic on November 21, 2010.

Shaw won the Strongman Super Series Swedish Grand Prix and became the 2010 overall Super Series champion on December 18, 2010. This was Shaw's second consecutive overall Super Series championship.

=== 2011–2012 ===
In 2011, Shaw once again participated in the World's Strongest Man competition. Going into the final event, the Atlas Stones, Shaw was tied with two-time champion Zydrunas Savickas. Shaw beat Savickas in the final event, taking 1st place. Shaw also won the 2011 Arnold Strongman Classic, becoming the fourth man to do so (after Mark Henry, Savickas, and Derek Poundstone). Doing so, he became the first man to win both the Arnold Strongman Classic and the World's Strongest Man in the same year.

However, in March 2012, at the 2012 Arnold Strongman Classic, Shaw suffered a left distal biceps tendon rupture in the first event, the Apollon Wheel. While he finished the event, he only finished 4th overall, missing out on a podium finish. This injury affected Shaw's performance in the 2012 World's Strongest Man Competition, resulting in him falling out of the podium for the first time since 2009.

=== 2013–2014 ===
In the 2013 World's Strongest Man competition, 13 weeks after surgery to repair his left biceps tendon, Shaw led Savickas into the final event (again the Atlas Stones) and again beat Savickas to win the competition. He broke Savickas' record in the deadlift, lifting 442.5 kg (975.5 lbs). He also won his inaugural national title by winning 2013 America's Strongest Man.

In 2014, Shaw placed 2nd overall in the Arnold Strongman Classic and 3rd overall in World's Strongest Man. He won 2014 North America's Strongest Man.

=== 2015–2016 ===
Shaw also won the 2015 and 2016 World's Strongest Man competitions. This made him one of five men to have won four World's Strongest Man competitions, together with Mariusz Pudzianowski (the only man with five), Jón Páll Sigmarsson, Magnús Ver Magnússon and Žydrūnas Savickas. Shaw also won the 2015 Arnold Strongman Classic competition, repeating his feat of winning both the Arnold Strongman Classic and the World's Strongest Man in the same year.

Shaw also won Americas Strongest Man for the second time in 2016.

=== 2017 ===
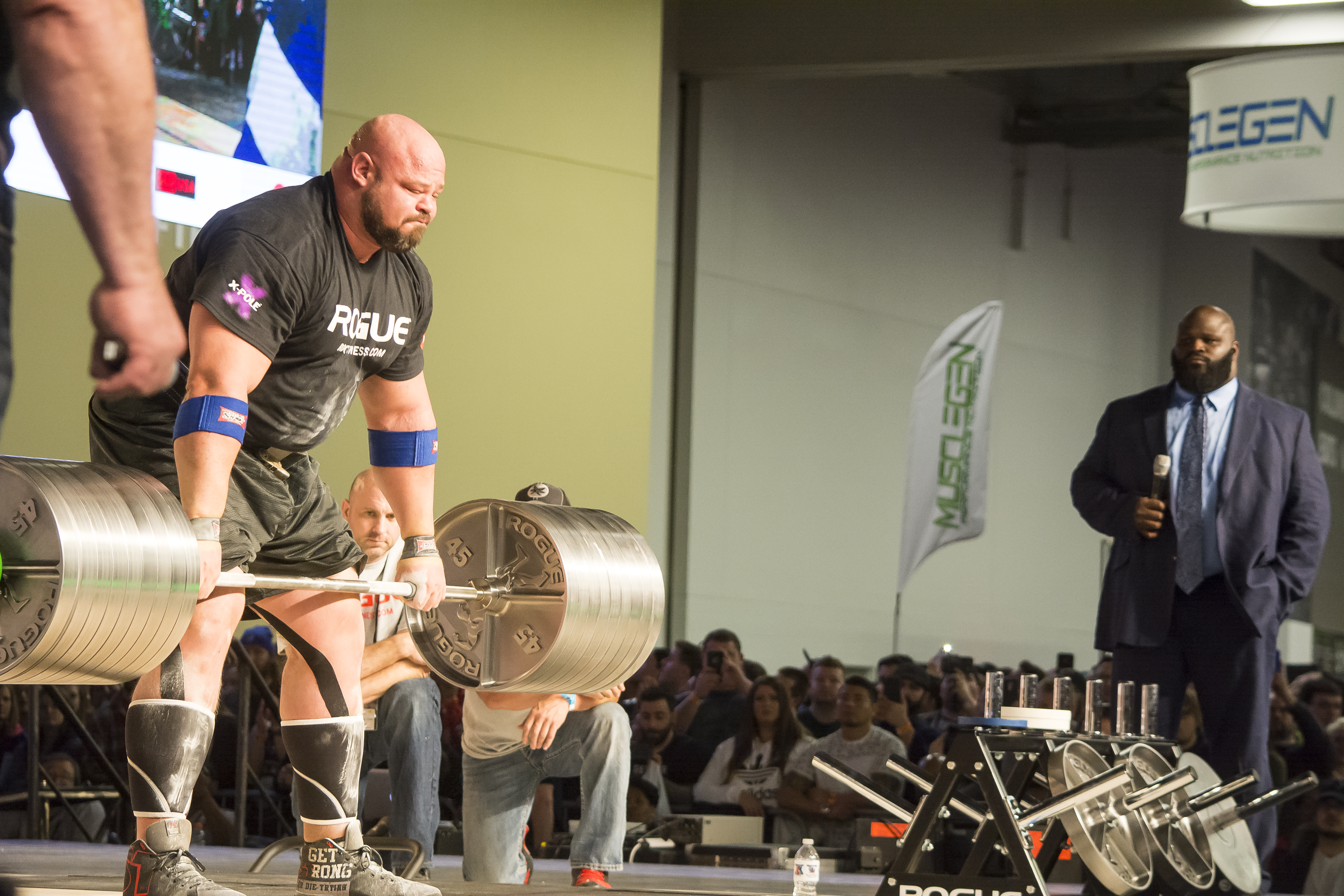
Shaw during the 2017 Arnold Strongman Classic

In 2017, Shaw competed in both the World's Strongest Man and the Arnold Strongman Classic competitions. Shaw won the Arnold Strongman Classic, but later in the year, he finished 3rd at the World's Strongest Man, behind the winner Eddie Hall and runner-up Hafþór Júlíus Björnsson.

=== 2018 ===
In March 2018, Shaw competed in the 2018 Arnold Strongman Classic, finishing 2nd place overall with 41.5 points to winner Hafþór Júlíus Björnsson's 46.

Shaw secured another podium finish at the 2018 World's Strongest Man after emerging 3rd behind Björnsson, who won his first World's Strongest Man competition, and runner-up Mateusz Kieliszkowski.

In October 2018, Shaw competed in the inaugural World's Ultimate Strongman which contained one of the most stacked lineups of all-time. Shaw struggled with some of the events including the deadlift where he had trained with a different bar height and the yoke walk where the stage cracked under the combined weight of Shaw and the yoke, causing him to briefly drop the yoke and increase his time. However he performed well, lifting all the objects in the overhead medley and was separated from leader Björnsson by 5.5 points going into the sixth and final event. In the sixth and final event, the Atlas Stones, Shaw lifted all five stones but this was not enough to surpass Bjornsson, leaving Shaw in second place.

=== 2019 ===
In March 2019, Shaw competed at the 2019 Arnold Strongman Classic. In his third attempt in the first event, the Rogue elephant bar deadlift, trying to keep up with Björnsson, Shaw tore his left hamstring. While he was able to complete four of the five events, he ultimately withdrew before the final event, finishing in 8th place. He had not finished below 2nd place in his previous six years in this contest. His next competition was the 2019 World's Strongest Man held in June 2019, where he finished in 6th place, falling out of podium position for the first time since 2012. His final event of the year was the World's Ultimate Strongman in Dubai, where he finished in 4th place.

=== 2020 ===
On January 18, 2020, Shaw placed second overall at the Arnold Strongman USA, behind the winner Martins Licis. As he failed to win the contest, he did not qualify for the 2020 Arnold Strongman Classic for the first time in 11 years.

On November 15, 2020, Shaw placed fifth overall at the 2020 World's Strongest Man competition, failing to make the podium. Shaw placed seventh in the Giant's Medley, fifth in the partial deadlift, sixth in the Hercules Hold, and seventh in the Log Ladder.

On December 11, 2020, he hosted the first Shaw Classic competition. Shaw hosted, organized, and paid out the purses for the competition. Rogue provided equipment for the competition with Trifecta announced as a sponsor. Shaw invited an All-Star cast of ten Strongmen to compete including the reigning Worlds Strongest Man Oleksii Novikov (who finished third.) Shaw would end up winning the competition and forfeiting his winning purse giving the winners share to the rest of the athletes. All ten competitors walked away with a share of the winning pool which included money Shaw invested, GoFundMe donations, and pay-per-view earnings.

=== 2021 ===
In the 2021 World's Strongest Man Competition, Shaw placed 2nd behind Scottish Strongman Tom Stoltman, his first podium finish since 2018. In the event he qualified for his record 13th WSM final, breaking a tie held by him and Zydrunas Savickas. All 13 of these finals were consecutive, another record. He also extended his own record by appearing in his 14th consecutive WSM contest, and equaled the record 10 podium finishes of Savickas. Shaw also set a new world record in the 15 kg (33 lb) keg toss for height, clearing a height of 7.75 metres (25 ft 5 in) (his previous record of 7.25 metres (23 ft 9 in) m was broken by 4 other men in the competition). Brian also finished in 2nd and 7th place at the Shaw Classic and Rogue Invitational later that year.

=== 2022 ===
In the 2022 World's Strongest Man Competition, Shaw placed 4th in the final and extended his record for consecutive WSM competitions to 15 and consecutive WSM finals to 14. He was also the runner-up at the 2022 Shaw Classic.

=== 2023 ===
In 2023, he announced that he would compete in two competitions prior to retiring, the World's Strongest Man and the Shaw Classic. Prior to World's Strongest Man, he contracted an infection in his leg requiring hospitalization and IV antibiotics. He recovered in time for his record extending 16th consecutive WSM competition. He competed in group four and finished in second behind Jaco Schoonwinkel. He had to face off against the third place finisher in his group Rauno Heinla in a stone off and was victorious advancing to his record-extending 15th final. He ended up finishing in 7th place in the final. A new award, the Knaack Tools of the Strongman Award, was also awarded to both Shaw and veteran strongman Mark Felix. The award was voted on by the athletes to recognize the hardest working athlete in the year's competition.

In the 2023 Shaw Classic, his final professional strongman competition, he scored the overall win by seven points over Mitchell Hooper to become a two-time Shaw Classic champion.

== Competitive record ==
Placements: 30 x 1st places, 16 x 2nd places and 7 x 3rd places = 53 x podium finishes from 72 total competitions.

- Winning percentage: 41.5% at International circuit & 42.9% at National circuit
- Podium percentage: 73.8% at International circuit & 71.4% at National circuit
- Top 5 percentage: 86.2% at International circuit & 85.7% at National circuit

	1st	2nd	3rd	Podium	4th	5th	Top 5	6th	7th	8th	9th	10th	16th	Total
International	27	15	6	48	6	2	56	2	4	1	1		1	65
National	3	1	1	5	1		6	1						7
Combined	30	16	7	53	7	2	62	3	4	1	1		1	72

== Personal records ==
During competitions

- IronMind S-Cubed Bar Deadlift (with straps) – 1,014 lb (460 kg) (2017 World's Strongest Man) (former joint-world record)
- Ironmind S-Cubed Bar Deadlift at partial deficit (with straps) – 981 lb (445 kg) (2016 World's Strongest Man) (joint-world record)
- Rogue Elephant bar Deadlift (with straps) – 1,021 lb (463 kg) (2016 & 2019 Arnold Strongman Classic's)
- Silver Dollar Deadlift (18 in) (with straps) – 1,080 lb (490 kg) (2018 World's Ultimate Strongman)
- Hummer tyre Deadlift (15 in) (with straps) – 1,128 lb (512 kg) (2014 Arnold Strongman Classic)
- Car Deadlift (for reps) – 851 lb (386 kg) x 12 reps (2018 World's Strongest Man) (joint-world record)
- IronMind Rolling Thunder (V1) – 255 lb (115.7 kg) (2008 Rolling Thunder World Championships)
- Giant Barbell Squat (for reps) – 700 lb (317.5 kg) × 13 reps (single-ply suit w/ wraps) (2017 World's Strongest Man)
- Log Lift – 441 lb (200 kg) × 2 reps (2014 Arnold Strongman Classic)
- Axle Press – 452 lb (205 kg) (2011 Giants Live London)
- Flintstone barbell push press (behind the neck) – 467 lb (212 kg) (2022 World's Strongest Man)
- Cyr Dumbbell press (for reps) – 300 lb (136 kg) x 3 reps (2016 Arnold Strongman Classic) (World Record), 273 lb (124 kg) x 6 reps (2015 Arnold Strongman Classic) (joint-world record)
- Manhood Stone (Max Atlas Stone) – 560 lb (254 kg) over 4 ft bar (2017 Rogue Record Breakers) (former world record) Shaw has broken this world record a total of 3 times ever since he did it first with 551 lb (250 kg) onto a 4 ft 6 in barrel in 2014 and 555 lb (252 kg) over 4 ft bar in 2016
- Manhood Stone (Max Atlas Stone) for reps – 536 lb (243 kg) x 4 reps over 4 ft bar (2011 Arnold Strongman Classic) (World Record) Shaw has also done 538 lb (244 kg) x 3 reps over 4 ft bar in 2013 ASC
- Atlas Stones – 5 Stones weighing 264–397 lb (120–180 kg) in 14.20 seconds (2010 Giants Live Turkey) (World Record)
  5 Stones weighing 287–397 lb (130–180 kg) in 17.76 seconds (2010 Giants Live South Africa) (World Record)
  5 Stones weighing 309–430 lb (140–195 kg) in 21.43 seconds (2009 Sweden Grand Prix) (World Record)
  5 Stones weighing 375–496 lb (170–225 kg) in 43.18 seconds (2018 World's Ultimate Strongman) (World Record)
- Atlas Stones – 6 Stones weighing 291–450 lb (132–204 kg) in 35.68 seconds (2020 Shaw Classic) (World Record)
  6 Stones weighing 265–397 lb (120–180 kg) 19.05 seconds (2014 Força Bruta) (World Record)
- Húsafell Stone (replica) – 410 lb (186 kg) for 31.72 metres (104 ft 1 in) (2019 Arnold Strongman Classic)
- Africa Stone – 397 lb (180 kg) for 62.9 metres (206 ft 4 in) (2010 Giants Live South Africa)
- Bale Tote – 1,565 lb (710 kg) (4 meter course) in 14.87 seconds (2017 Arnold Strongman Classic) (World Record)
- Keg Toss – 8 kegs 40–55 lb (18–25 kg) over 4.90 metres (16 ft 1 in) bar in 16.59 seconds (2014 World's Strongest Man) (former world record)
- Keg Toss – 33 lb (15 kg) over 7.75 metres (25 ft 5 in) bar (2021 World's Strongest Man) (former world record)
- Sandbag over bar – 90 lb (40.8 kg) over 4.57 metres (15 ft 0 in) (2018 Arnold Strongman Classic)
- Kettlebell toss (for speed) – 7 bells (51–66 lb (23–30 kg)) over 4.70 metres (15 ft 5 in) in 42.07 seconds (2015 World's Strongest Man, group 1) (World Record)
- Tyre flip – 500 kg (1,102 lb) x 6 flips in 27.28 seconds (2017 World's Strongest Man) (World Record)
- Power Stairs (3 x 496 lb (225 kg) Duck walks / total of 15 steps) – 37.81 seconds (2015 World's Strongest Man)
- Arm over arm uphill boat pull – 672 lb (305 kg) for 20m course in 32.44 seconds (2009 World's Strongest Man) (World Record)
- Conan's Wheel of Pain – 20,000 lb (9,072 kg) 28.96 meters (95 1/16 feet) (2019 Arnold Strongman Classic)
- Truck pull – 52,911 lb (24,000 kg) for 25 meter course 'uphill' in 40.56 seconds (2014 World's Strongest Man) (World Record)
- Viking boat pull – 60,000 lb (27,216 kg) for 18 meter course 'uphill' in 44.05 seconds (2019 Strongest Man in History TV show) (World Record)
- Truck pull – 61,730 lb (28,000 kg) 'uphill' for 23.84 metres (78 ft 3 in) (2015 World's Strongest Man) (World Record)

During training

- Elephant bar Deadlift (with straps) – 1,031 lb (467.7 kg) (former unofficial world record)
- Trap Bar Deadlift (for reps) – 623 lb (283 kg) x 8 reps
- Hummer Tyre Deadlift (15 in from the floor) (with straps) – 1,140 lb (517 kg)
- Rack pull/ hip lift – 1,365 lb (619 kg) x 3 reps (Weight resistance measured at very top of the pull. The lift was done using resistance bands, hip harness and a loaded barbell and belt squat machine)
- Squat – 904 lb (410 kg)
- Safety bar 'bottom-up' Squat – 903 lb (409.6 kg) x 3 reps, 815 lb (369.7 kg) x 5 reps (Bottom up portion of the lift only. Weight resistance measured at very top of the squat. The lifts were done using resistance bands and the loaded SSB)
- Bench press – 530 lb (240.4 kg) × 2 reps
- Dumbbell bench press – 200 lb (90.7 kg) dumbbells in each hand × 5 reps
- Log press – 465 lb (211 kg)
- Manhood Stone (Max Atlas Stone) – 558 lb (253 kg) x 2 reps
- Dinnie Stone carry in farmers walk style (with the original stones) – 733 lb (332.5 kg) for 11.54 ft (3.52 m) (former world record)
- Inch Dumbbell one hand lift (grip), both left and right hands at the same time – 176.8 lb (80.2 kg) and 176.2 lb (79.9 kg) (4.3 and 3.7 lb heavier than the original) with 2 3/8" (6.03 cm) diameter handles
  Double Inch dumbbell lifts, converted into incline presses – 5 reps (former world record)
- Millennium Dumbbell one hand lift (grip), left and right – 228 lb (103.4 kg) dumbbell with 2 3/8" (6.03 cm) diameter handle
- IronMind Little Big Horn – 238 lb (108 kg) (former unofficial world record)
- Captains of Crush Grippers – No.3 (280 lb (127 kg)/ RGC 149 of pressure)
- Pinch grip and lifting a pair of York plates – 45 lb (20.4 kg) x 2 York deep-dish barbell plates
- Blob run – 19 x 2nd gen York blobs weighing 13–71 lb (6–32 kg) raised to a 1 ft platform in 41 seconds (unofficial world record)

→ Starts with a half 30 which goes in increments of 5 until the half 100 Sorin blob (#15 of the run) and goes in increments of 10 until the half 130 Blobzilla (#18 of the run) and ends with the half 150 Shaw blob. Not to be confused with the official blob run featured at Shaw Classic Expo, where the starting blob is a half 75.

- Indoor Rowing – 100 meters in 12.8 seconds (former unofficial world record)

== Arm wrestling ==
Brian Shaw
Personal information
- Weight: 370–404 lb (168–183 kg)

Sport
- Sport: Armwrestling
- Weight class: Super-heavyweight

=== 2024 ===
Shaw started his Armwrestling career on December 14, when he faced Eddie Hall at King Of The Table 13 in a right handed best of 7 supermatch. He was trained by Devon Larratt. He won the match 4-2.

=== 2025 ===
Shaw faced Brandon Allen on August 15, Allen who had previously defeated Larry Wheels, Shaw was nonetheless able to defeat him by winning the match at the Shaw Classic 3-1. Becoming his second supermatch win in his newly started Armwrestling career.

=== 2026 ===
Shaw faced Leonidas Arkona on April 18 at East vs West 23 in Germany, but was defeated 2-3. Arkona overcame an 108 lb (49 kg) weight gap and pinned Shaw three times while Shaw's scoring came as a result of fouls, not being able to pin Arkona even once.

=== Notable matches ===
Year	Opponent	Result	Hand	Outcome	Event
2024	Eddie Hall	Won	Right Hand	4-2	King Of The Table 13
2025	Brandon Allen	Won	Right Hand	3-1	EvW 19/Strongest Arm On Earth/Shaw Classic
2026	Leonidas Arkona	Loss	Right Hand	2-3	East vs West 23

== Personal life ==
Brian married his wife Keri in 2015. Keri was formerly married to strongman competitor Mike Jenkins until his death in 2013. The couple have two sons, Braxton and Kellen, and they live in Brighton, Colorado.

== Other ventures ==
Shaw has a YouTube channel, SHAWSTRENGTH, which has videos of training footage, fitness and strength challenges, and eating challenges. Eddie Hall is also seen occasionally on his videos.

Shaw was one of four strongmen to be featured in the History Channel series, The Strongest Man in History, which premiered on July 10, 2019. On the first episode of the show, he pulled a 12,000 lb (5,400 kg) viking ship on a 60 feet (18 m) incline course which translates the weight to around 60,000 lb (27,000 kg) in 44.05 seconds. On the third episode, he lifted, via the very top of a yoke squat, a platform and water-filled barrels weighing 2,028 lb (920 kg). Even though the range of motion here was approximately an inch, this is considered the heaviest partial squat of all time.

Shaw is also the owner of the supplement brand Undefined Nutrition and the supportive gear equipment company Evolution Athletics.

== Filmography ==
=== Film ===
Year	Title	Role	Notes
2018	Kickboxer: Retaliation	Huge Convict	

=== Television ===
Year	Title	Role	Notes
2009–2023	World's Strongest Man	Himself – Competitor	
2019	The Strongest Man in History	Himself	1 Season

== Bibliography ==
=== Books ===
Year	Title	Role
2025	Brian Shaw: The Path to Greatness	Author

== See also ==
- List of strongmen
