= Matt Bell (television presenter) =

British television presenter

Matthew Bell
- Born: 6 May 1980 (age 46); England
- Occupations: Television presenter, writer and comedian
- Website: https://wolfshoulder.com

Matthew J Bell is a television presenter, writer and comedian best known for presenting The Hotel Inspector Unseen, a spinoff from The Hotel Inspector on 5*.

== Biography ==
Matthew's represented by agent Vivienne Clore.

== Television career ==
Matt Bell is a TV presenter, writer and comic.

Bell's television debut came in 2008 in the form of The Hotel Inspector spin off The Hotel Inspector Unseen which saw Matt delving into failing hotels and exposing their dirty secrets in a 'reveal all' style programme.

He first appeared on The Hotel Inspector Unseen on digital channel Fiver in 2008 and has since presented shows exclusively for Sky One. He is the roving reporter on Sky's studio show Pet Nation with Liza Tarbuck and Huey Morgan (Fun Lovin Criminals), an entertainment studio based format about the British national obsession with pets, aired in early 2010.

Since November 2009, he has regularly appeared on Sky One's daytime talk show Angela and Friends as one of Angela's friends.

He has recently started presenting the online content for Sky One's new flagship programme Got To Dance with Davina McCall.

He is also a regular member of 'The Jelly Moustache', a comedy troupe who write, produce and perform sketches for digital channel Shorts TV.

In 2015, Bell co-presented the UK's Strongest Man on Channel 5.
