= 2018 Europe's Strongest Man =

Competition

Competition information
- Dates: 7 April 2018
- Venue: First Direct Arena
- Location: Leeds
- Country: United Kingdom
- Athletes participating: 10
- Nations participating: 6

Champion(s)
- (Iceland) Hafþór Björnsson

The 2018 Europe's Strongest Man was a strongman competition that took place in Leeds, England on 7 April 2018 at the First Direct Arena. This event was part of the 2018 Giants live tour.

Reigning champion Hafþór Björnsson won his fourth Europe's Strongest Man title.

== Participants ==
- Terry Hollands (UK)
- Graham Hicks (UK)
- Mateusz Kieliszkowski (POL)
- Hafþór Björnsson (ISL)
- Matjaz Belsak (SLO)
- Mark Felix (UK)
- Konstantine Janashia (GEO)
- Zydrunas Savickas (LTU)
- Vytautas Lalas (LTU)
- Luke Stoltman (UK)

== Results of events ==
=== Event 1: Max Log Lift ===
- Notes: A number of athletes were invited to take part in this event only and therefore they did not score points.

#	Athlete	Nation	Weight	Event Points	Overall Points
1	Hafþór Björnsson	Iceland	213 kilograms (470 lb)	10	10
2	Konstantine Janashia	Georgia	200 kilograms (440 lb)	7.5	7.5
2	Zydrunas Savickas	Lithuania	200 kilograms (440 lb)	7.5	7.5
2	Graham Hicks	United Kingdom	200 kilograms (440 lb)	7.5	7.5
2	Krzysztof Radzikowski	Poland	200 kilograms (440 lb)	7.5	7.5
6	Matjaz Belsak	Slovenia	190 kilograms (420 lb)	5	5
7	Mateusz Kieliszkowski	Poland	175 kilograms (386 lb)	3.5	3.5
7	Vytautas Lalas	Lithuania	175 kilograms (386 lb)	3.5	3.5
—	Terry Hollands	United Kingdom	N/A	0	0
—	Mark Felix	United Kingdom	N/A	0	0

Athlete	Nation	Weight
Eddie Hall	United Kingdom	213 kilograms (470 lb)
Cheick Sanou	Burkina Faso	213 kilograms (470 lb)
Rob Kearney	United States	200 kilograms (440 lb)
Robert Oberst	United States	190 kilograms (420 lb)

=== Event 2: Deadlift ===
- Weight: 380 kilograms (840 lb) for as many repetitions as possible.
- Time Limit: 60 seconds
- Notes: This was completed on an axle deadlift bar.

#	Athlete	Nation	Repetitions	Event Points	Overall Points
1	Hafþór Björnsson	Iceland	6	10	20
2	Konstantine Janashia	Georgia	5	8.5	16
2	Vytautas Lalas	Lithuania	5	8.5	12
4	Graham Hicks	United Kingdom	4	7	14.5
5	Zydrunas Savickas	Lithuania	3	4.5	12
5	Krzysztof Radzikowski	Poland	3	4.5	12
5	Matjaz Belsak	Slovenia	3	4.5	9.5
5	Mark Felix	United Kingdom	3	4.5	4.5
9	Mateusz Kieliszkowski	Poland	1	1.5	5
9	Terry Hollands	United Kingdom	1	1.5	1.5

=== Event 3: Farmer's Walk ===
- Weight: 160 kilograms (350 lb) per hand.
- Course Length: 40 metres (130 ft)

#	Athlete	Nation	Time	Event Points	Overall Points
1	Mateusz Kieliszkowski	Poland	19.90	10	15
2	Terry Hollands	United Kingdom	22.13	9	10.5
3	Zydrunas Savickas	Lithuania	22.88	8	20
4	Konstantine Janashia	Georgia	23.77	7	23
5	Hafþór Björnsson	Iceland	26.67	6	26
6	Mark Felix	United Kingdom	45.72	5	9.5
7	Krzysztof Radzikowski (Note: Krzysztof Radzikowski sustained an injury in this event and took no further part in the competition.)	Poland	38.68 metres (126.9 ft)	4	16
8	Matjaz Belsak	Slovenia	29.60 metres (97.1 ft)	3	12.5
9	Graham Hicks	United Kingdom	28.40 metres (93.2 ft)	2	16.5
10	Vytautas Lalas (Note: Vytautas Lalas sustained an injury in this event and took no further part in the competition.)	Lithuania	20.00 metres (65.62 ft)	1	13

=== Event 4: Car Walk ===
- Weight: 450 kilograms (990 lb)
- Course Length: 20 metres (66 ft)

#	Athlete	Nation	Time	Event Points	Overall Points
1	Mateusz Kieliszkowski	Poland	11.22	10	25
2	Hafþór Björnsson	Iceland	13.22	9	35
3	Graham Hicks	United Kingdom	14.71	8	24.5
4	Zydrunas Savickas	Lithuania	16.20	7	27
5	Terry Hollands	United Kingdom	18.07	6	16.5
6	Konstantine Janashia	Georgia	20.95	5	28
7	Mark Felix	United Kingdom	22.40	4	13.5
8	Matjaz Belsak	Slovenia	7.32 metres (24.0 ft)	3	15.5

=== Event 5: Atlas Stones ===
- Weight: 5 stone series ranging from 120–200 kilograms (260–440 lb).

#	Athlete	Nation	Time	Event Points	Overall Points
1	Mateusz Kieliszkowski	Poland	5 in 24.62	10	35
2	Hafþór Björnsson	Iceland	5 in 34.13	9	44
3	Konstantine Janashia	Georgia	5 in 36.14	8	36
4	Terry Hollands	United Kingdom	5 in 57.75	7	23.5
5	Zydrunas Savickas	Lithuania	4 in 22.27	6	33
6	Matjaz Belsak	Slovenia	4 in 31.19	5	20.5
7	Mark Felix	United Kingdom	4 in 31.21	4	17.5
8	Graham Hicks	United Kingdom	3 in 15.00	3	27.5

== Final results ==
#	Athlete	Nation	Points
1st place, gold medalist(s)	Hafþór Björnsson	Iceland	44
2nd place, silver medalist(s)	Konstantine Janashia	Georgia	36
3rd place, bronze medalist(s)	Mateusz Kieliszkowski	Poland	35
4	Zydrunas Savickas	Lithuania	33
5	Graham Hicks	United Kingdom	27.5
6	Terry Hollands	United Kingdom	23.5
7	Matjaz Belsak	Slovenia	20.5
8	Mark Felix	United Kingdom	17.5
9	Krzysztof Radzikowski	Poland	16
10	Vytautas Lalas	Lithuania	13

Preceded by 2017 Europe's Strongest Man	Europe's Strongest Man	Succeeded by 2019 Europe's Strongest Man
