= Johan Els =

South African strongman

Personal information
- Nationality: South African
- Born: 29 May 1979 (age 47)
- Occupation: Strongman
- Height: 6 ft 4 in (1.93 m)
- Weight: 155–160 kg (342–353 lb)
- Spouse: Annelle Els (m. 2021)
Medal record
Strongman
Representing South Africa
World's Strongest Man
Qualified	2016 World's Strongest Man
Qualified	2017 World's Strongest Man
6th	2018 World's Strongest Man
Africa's Strongest Man
1st	2016 Africa's Strongest Man
1st	2018 Africa's Strongest Man
Arnold Pro Strongman World Series
7th	2017 Arnold Africa
5th	2018 Arnold Africa

Johan Els (born 29 May 1979) is a South African strongman competitor from Christiana, South Africa.

He is a 2 x times Africa's Strongest Man Champion (2016 and 2018) and was selected to the World's Strongest Man competition thrice, winning 6th place in the 2018 World's Strongest Man competition held in Manila, Philippines. Els was coached by Ricardo Barreto.

In 2019, Els retired from Strongman to pursue his ambition of becoming a disciple of Jesus Christ.

== Personal records ==
- Deadlift – 405 kg (893 lb) (2018 Africa's Strongest Man) (former African Record)
- Car Deadlift – 386 kg (851 lb) x 5 reps (2018 WSM Finals)
- Deadlift Ladder – 290–350 kg (639–772 lb) 5 lifts under 60 seconds (2018 WSM - Group 2)
- Log press – 158 kg (348 lb) (2017 WSM - Group 3)
- Viking press – 154 kg (340 lb) (2016 WSM - Group 5)
- Circus Dumbbell press – 90 kg (198 lb) (2018 WSM - Group 2)
- Super Yoke – 450 kg (992 lb) for 5.57 meters (2018 Arnold Africa)
- Farmer's walk – 185 kg (408 lb) per each hand for 20 meters in 25.59 seconds (2018 Arnold Africa)
- Elephant frame carry – 200 kg (441 lb) for 44.93 meters (2017 WSM - Group 3)
- Keg toss – 15 kg (33 lb) over 6.75 meters (2016 WSM - Group 5)
- Kettlebell throw – 7 kettlebells from 21–30 kg (46–66 lb) over 4.75 meters in 51.59 seconds (2018 WSM - Group 2)
- Loading race – 105 kg Anchor, 125 kg Anvil, 120 kg Keg, 150 kg Sandbag & 120 kg Safe (10m) - 34.12 seconds (2018 WSM Finals)
- Medley – 2 x 150 kg sacks and 150 kg per each hand farmer's walk for 12 meters in 33.96 seconds (2018 WSM - Group 2)
- Atlas Stones – 150–200 kg (331–441 lb) 5 stones in 32.16 seconds (2018 WSM - Group 2)
- Atlas Stone over bar – 220 kg (485 lb) x 4 reps, over a 4' bar (2018 Arnold Africa)
- Arm Over Arm Pull – 6,850 kg (15,102 lb) for 17.57 meters (2018 WSM - Group 2)
- Bus pull – 28,123 kg (62,001 lb) 25 meters in 40.25 seconds (2018 WSM Finals)

Reference: Strongmanarchives.com
