= 2017 Europe's Strongest Man =

Competition information
- Dates: 1 April 2017
- Venue: First Direct Arena
- Location: Leeds
- Country: United Kingdom
- Athletes participating: 11
- Nations participating: 5

Champion(s)
- (Iceland) Hafþór Björnsson

The 2017 Europe's Strongest Man was a strongman competition that took place in Leeds, England on 1 April 2017 at the First Direct Arena. This event was part of the 2017 Giants live tour.

Hafþór Björnsson won his third Europe's Strongest Man title.

== Participants ==
- Terry Hollands (UK)
- Eddie Hall (UK)
- Laurence Shahlaei (UK)
- Hafþór Björnsson (ISL)
- Matjaz Belsak (SLO)
- Mark Felix (UK)
- Konstantine Janashia (GEO)
- Adam Bishop (UK)
- Dainis Zageris (LAT)
- Raffael Gordzielik (GER)
- Luke Stoltman (UK)

== Results of events ==
=== Event 1: Bus Pull ===
- Weight: 8,000 kilograms (18,000 lb)
- Course Length: 30 metres (98 ft)

#	Athlete	Nation	Time	Event Points	Overall Points
1	Hafþór Björnsson	Iceland	32.52	11	11
2	Terry Hollands	United Kingdom	19.57 metres (64.2 ft)	10	10
3	Eddie Hall	United Kingdom	19.15 metres (62.8 ft)	9	9
4	Matjaz Belsak	Slovenia	18.65 metres (61.2 ft)	8	8
5	Konstantine Janashia	Georgia	18.47 metres (60.6 ft)	7	7
6	Laurence Shahlaei	United Kingdom	17.18 metres (56.4 ft)	6	6
7	Luke Stoltman	United Kingdom	16.55 metres (54.3 ft)	5	5
8	Dainis Zageris	Latvia	16.40 metres (53.8 ft)	4	4
9	Mark Felix	United Kingdom	16.25 metres (53.3 ft)	3	3
10	Adam Bishop	United Kingdom	15.31 metres (50.2 ft)	2	2
11	Raffael Gordzielik	Germany	14.65 metres (48.1 ft)	1	1

=== Event 2: Max Axle Press ===
#	Athlete	Nation	Weight	Event Points	Overall Points
1	Eddie Hall (Note: Eddie Hall established a new world record with his performance.)	United Kingdom	216 kilograms (476 lb)	11	20
2	Hafþór Björnsson	Iceland	206 kilograms (454 lb)	10	21
3	Matjaz Belsak	Slovenia	200 kilograms (440 lb)	9	17
4	Konstantine Janashia	Georgia	180 kilograms (400 lb)	7.5	14.5
4	Laurence Shahlaei	United Kingdom	180 kilograms (400 lb)	7.5	13.5
6	Terry Hollands	United Kingdom	160 kilograms (350 lb)	4	14
6	Luke Stoltman	United Kingdom	160 kilograms (350 lb)	4	9
6	Mark Felix	United Kingdom	160 kilograms (350 lb)	4	7
6	Adam Bishop (Note: Adam Bishop sustained an injury in this event and took no further part in the competition.)	United Kingdom	160 kilograms (350 lb)	4	6
6	Raffael Gordzielik	Germany	160 kilograms (350 lb)	4	5
11	Dainis Zageris	Latvia	N/A	0	4

=== Event 3: Flip and Drag ===
- Weight: 4 x 450 kilograms (990 lb) tyre flips, 1 x anchor drag
- Course Length: 30 metres (98 ft)

#	Athlete	Nation	Time	Event Points	Overall Points
1	Hafþór Björnsson (Note: Hafþór Björnsson established a new world record with his performance.)	Iceland	29.06	11	32
2	Terry Hollands	United Kingdom	35.66	10	24
3	Eddie Hall	United Kingdom	36.88	9	29
4	Konstantine Janashia	Georgia	37.46	8	22.5
5	Laurence Shahlaei	United Kingdom	38.51	7	20.5
6	Luke Stoltman	United Kingdom	40.19	6	15
7	Mark Felix	United Kingdom	42.27	5	12
8	Matjaz Belsak	Slovenia	44.86	4	21
9	Dainis Zageris	Latvia	53.85	3	7
10	Raffael Gordzielik	Germany	1:02.13	2	7

=== Event 4: Deadlift ===
- Weight: 362.5 kilograms (799 lb) for as many repetitions as possible.
- Time Limit: 60 seconds

#	Athlete	Nation	Repetitions	Event Points	Overall Points
1	Eddie Hall	United Kingdom	10	11	40
2	Hafþór Björnsson	Iceland	8	10	42
3	Mark Felix	United Kingdom	7	9	21
4	Konstantine Janashia	Georgia	6	8	30.5
5	Terry Hollands	United Kingdom	5	7	31
6	Dainis Zageris (Note: ^ Dainis Zageris sustained an injury in this event and took no further part in the competition.)	Latvia	4	6	13
7	Matjaz Belsak	Slovenia	3	4.5	25.5
7	Raffael Gordzielik	Germany	3	4.5	11.5
9	Luke Stoltman	United Kingdom	1	3	18
10	Laurence Shahlaei (Note: Laurence Shahlaei sustained an injury in this event and took no further part in the competition.)	United Kingdom	N/A	0	20.5

=== Event 5: Car Walk ===
- Weight: 450 kilograms (990 lb)
- Course Length: 30 metres (98 ft)

#	Athlete	Nation	Time	Event Points	Overall Points
1	Eddie Hall	United Kingdom	12.51	11	51
2	Hafþór Björnsson	Iceland	12.84	10	52
3	Terry Hollands	United Kingdom	14.08	9	40
4	Mark Felix	United Kingdom	16.11	8	29
5	Konstantine Janashia	Georgia	16.91	7	37.5
6	Matjaz Belsak	Slovenia	17.46	6	31.5
7	Luke Stoltman	United Kingdom	20.23	5	23
8	Raffael Gordzielik	Germany	21.58	4	15.5

=== Event 6: Atlas Stones ===
- Weight: 5 stone series ranging from 120–200 kilograms (260–440 lb).

#	Athlete	Nation	Time	Event Points	Overall Points
1	Hafþór Björnsson (Note: Hafþór Björnsson's 17 seconds stone run with the heavy stone set is the current 120–200 kilograms (260–440 lb) Atlas stones world record.)	Iceland	5 in 17.54	11	63
2	Eddie Hall	United Kingdom	5 in 23.81	10	61
3	Mark Felix	United Kingdom	5 in 30.68	9	38
4	Terry Hollands	United Kingdom	5 in 42.64	8	48
5	Luke Stoltman	United Kingdom	5 in 42.70	7	30
6	Konstantine Janashia	Georgia	4 in 20.55	6	43.5
7	Matjaz Belsak	Slovenia	4 in 28.84	5	36.5
8	Raffael Gordzielik	Germany	4 in 51.17	4	19.5

== Final results ==
#	Athlete	Nation	Points
1st place, gold medalist(s)	Hafþór Björnsson	Iceland	63
2nd place, silver medalist(s)	Eddie Hall	United Kingdom	61
3rd place, bronze medalist(s)	Terry Hollands	United Kingdom	48
4	Konstantine Janashia	Georgia	43.5
5	Mark Felix	United Kingdom	38
6	Matjaz Belsak	Slovenia	36.5
7	Luke Stoltman	United Kingdom	30
8	Laurence Shahlaei	United Kingdom	20.5
9	Raffael Gordzielik	Germany	19.5
10	Dainis Zageris	Latvia	13
11	Adam Bishop	United Kingdom	6

Preceded by 2016 Europe's Strongest Man	Europe's Strongest Man	Succeeded by 2018 Europe's Strongest Man
