= Slovenia's Strongest Man =

Sports Competition

Tournament information
- Location: Slovenia
- Established: 1996
- Format: Multi-event competition

Current champion
- (Slovenia) Matjaz Belsak

Slovenia's Strongest Man (Slovene: Najmočnejši človek Slovenije) is an annual strongman competition held in Slovenia and featuring exclusively Slovenian athletes. The contest was established in 1996. It is a multi event competition that tests competitors in a number of different events and the cumulative total of all the events determine who the winner is.

Matjaz Belsak holds the record for most wins with 7 titles.

== Champions breakdown ==
Year	Champion	Runner-up	3rd place
1996	(Slovenia) Janez Blazic	(To be confirmed)	(To be confirmed)
1997	(Slovenia) Janez Blazic	(To be confirmed)	(To be confirmed)
1998	(Slovenia) Janez Blazic	(To be confirmed)	(To be confirmed)
1999	(Slovenia) Denis Udovic	(To be confirmed)	(To be confirmed)
2000	(Slovenia) Denis Udovic	(To be confirmed)	(To be confirmed)
2001	(Slovenia) Denis Udovic	(To be confirmed)	(To be confirmed)
2002	(Slovenia) Boris Milosevic	(To be confirmed)	(To be confirmed)
2003	(Slovenia) Martin Matjasic	(To be confirmed)	(To be confirmed)
2004	(Slovenia) Josko Pirnat	(To be confirmed)	(To be confirmed)
2005	(Slovenia) Gregor Stegnar	(Slovenia) Oliver Gasparic	(To be confirmed)
2006	(Slovenia) Oliver Gasparic	(Slovenia) Denis Udovic	(Slovenia) Gregor Stegnar
2007	(Slovenia) Gregor Stegnar	(Slovenia) Oliver Gasparic	(Slovenia) Andrej Uslakar (Slovenia) Sandi Ivancic
2008	(Slovenia) Gregor Stegnar	(Slovenia) Tomaz Plevanc	(Slovenia) Oliver Gasparic
2009	(Slovenia) Oliver Gasparic	(Slovenia) Tomaz Plevanc	(Slovenia) Damjan Slapnik
2010	(Slovenia) Oliver Gasparic	(Slovenia) Tomaz Plevanc	(Slovenia) Andrej Uslakar
2011	(Slovenia) Oliver Gasparic	(Slovenia) Damjan Slapnik	(Slovenia) Marko Porovne
2012	(Slovenia) Damjan Slapnik	(To be confirmed)	(To be confirmed)
2013	(Slovenia) Damjan Slapnik	(To be confirmed)	(To be confirmed)
2014	(Slovenia) Matjaz Belsak	(To be confirmed)	(To be confirmed)
2015	(Slovenia) Matjaz Belsak	(To be confirmed)	(To be confirmed)
2016–2017	Event not held		
2018	(Slovenia) Matjaz Belsak	(Slovenia) Marko Porovne	(Slovenia) Jaka Krzisnik
2019	(Slovenia) Matjaz Belsak	(Slovenia) Jaka Krzisnik	(Slovenia) Andraz Starc
2020–2021	Event not held		
2022	(Slovenia) Matjaz Belsak	(To be confirmed)	(To be confirmed)
2023	(Slovenia) Matjaz Belsak	(To be confirmed)	(To be confirmed)
2024	(Slovenia) Matjaz Belsak	(To be confirmed)	(To be confirmed)

=== Repeat champions ===
Champion	Times & years
(Slovenia) Matjaz Belsak	7 (2014, 2015, 2018, 2019, 2022, 2023, 2024)
(Slovenia) Oliver Gasparic	4 (2006, 2009, 2010, 2011)
(Slovenia) Janez Blazic	3 (1996, 1997, 1998)
(Slovenia) Denis Udovic	3 (1999, 2000, 2001)
(Slovenia) Gregor Stegnar	3 (2005, 2007, 2008)
(Slovenia) Damjan Slapnik	2 (2012, 2013)
