= 2019 Europe's Strongest Man =

Competition information
- Dates: 6 April 2019
- Venue: First Direct Arena
- Location: Leeds
- Country: United Kingdom
- Athletes participating: 9
- Nations participating: 5

Champion(s)
- (Iceland) Hafþór Björnsson

The 2019 Europe's Strongest Man was a strongman competition that took place in Leeds, England on 6 April 2019 at the First Direct Arena. This event was part of the 2019 Giants live tour.

Reigning champion Hafþór Björnsson won his fifth Europe's Strongest Man title.

== Participants ==
- Adam Bishop (UK)
- Mikhail Shivlyakov (RUS)
- Hafþór Björnsson (ISL)
- Laurence Shahlaei (UK)
- Mark Felix (UK)
- Konstantine Janashia (GEO)
- Tom Stoltman (UK)
- Luke Stoltman (UK)
- Mateusz Kieliszkowski (POL)

== Results of events ==
=== Event 1: Max Log Lift ===
- Notes: A number of athletes were invited to take part in this event only and therefore they did not score points.

#	Athlete	Nation	Weight	Event Points	Overall Points
1	Mateusz Kieliszkowski	Poland	214 kilograms (472 lb)	9	9
2	Hafþór Björnsson	Iceland	203 kilograms (448 lb)	7.5	7.5
2	Konstantine Janashia	Georgia	203 kilograms (448 lb)	7.5	7.5
4	Tom Stoltman	United Kingdom	190 kilograms (420 lb)	5	5
4	Mikhail Shivlyakov	Russia	190 kilograms (420 lb)	5	5
4	Luke Stoltman	United Kingdom	190 kilograms (420 lb)	5	5
7	Laurence Shahlaei	United Kingdom	175 kilograms (386 lb)	3	3
—	Mark Felix	United Kingdom	N/A	0	0
—	Adam Bishop	United Kingdom	N/A	0	0

Athlete	Nation	Weight
Cheick Sanou (Note: Cheick Sanou's lift of 220 kilograms (490 lb) is a Burkinabé record.)	Burkina Faso	220 kilograms (490 lb)
Rob Kearney (Note: Rob Kearney's lift of 214 kilograms (472 lb) is an American record.)	United States	214 kilograms (472 lb)
Graham Hicks	United Kingdom	214 kilograms (472 lb)
Larry Wheels	United States	203 kilograms (448 lb)

=== Event 2: Deadlift ===
- Weight: 350 kilograms (770 lb) for as many repetitions as possible.
- Time Limit: 60 seconds
- Notes: This event was completed on an axle bar.

#	Athlete	Nation	Repetitions	Event Points	Overall Points
1	Hafþór Björnsson	Iceland	10	9	16.5
2	Konstantine Janashia	Georgia	9	8	15.5
3	Mikhail Shivlyakov	Russia	8	6.5	11.5
3	Adam Bishop	United Kingdom	8	6.5	6.5
5	Mark Felix	United Kingdom	7	5	5
6	Tom Stoltman	United Kingdom	6	4	9
7	Mateusz Kieliszkowski	Poland	5	3	12
8	Luke Stoltman	United Kingdom	4	1.5	6.5
8	Laurence Shahlaei	United Kingdom	4	1.5	4.5

=== Event 3: Flip and Drag ===
- Weight: 4 x 450 kilograms (990 lb) tyre flips, 1 x anchor drag
- Course Length: 30 metres (98 ft)

#	Athlete	Nation	Time	Event Points	Overall Points
1	Mateusz Kieliszkowski	Poland	43.14	9	21
2	Hafþór Björnsson	Iceland	44.49	8	24.5
3	Tom Stoltman	United Kingdom	45.47	7	16
4	Luke Stoltman	United Kingdom	46.90	6	12.5
5	Mikhail Shivlyakov	Russia	49.51	5	16.5
6	Adam Bishop	United Kingdom	56.41	4	10.5
7	Konstantine Janashia	Georgia	57.19	3	18.5
8	Mark Felix	United Kingdom	5.5 metres (18 ft)	2	7
9	Laurence Shahlaei	United Kingdom	N/A	0	4.5

=== Event 4: Hercules Hold ===
- Weight: 160 kilograms (350 lb) pillars in each hand.

#	Athlete	Nation	Time	Event Points	Overall Points
1	Mark Felix	United Kingdom	1:22.26	9	16
2	Hafþór Björnsson	Iceland	55.13	8	32.5
3	Laurence Shahlaei (Note: Laurence Shahlaei sustained an injury in this event and took no further part in the competition.)	United Kingdom	46.56	7	11.5
4	Adam Bishop	United Kingdom	44.30	6	16.5
5	Mikhail Shivlyakov	Russia	43.34	5	21.5
6	Luke Stoltman	United Kingdom	40.90	4	16.5
7	Konstantine Janashia	Georgia	40.02	3	21.5
8	Mateusz Kieliszkowski	Poland	40.00	2	23
9	Tom Stoltman	United Kingdom	31.50	1	17

=== Event 5: Atlas Stones ===
- Weight: 5 stone series ranging from 120–200 kilograms (260–440 lb).

#	Athlete	Nation	Time	Event Points	Overall Points
1	Tom Stoltman	United Kingdom	5 in 21.81	9	26
2	Mateusz Kieliszkowski	Poland	5 in 22.61	8	31
3	Konstantine Janashia	Georgia	5 in 28.52	7	28.5
4	Luke Stoltman	United Kingdom	5 in 57.31	6	22.5
5	Mark Felix	United Kingdom	4 in 29.15	5	21
6	Mikhail Shivlyakov	Russia	4 in 34.69	4	25.5
7	Hafþór Björnsson	Iceland	3 in 20.39	3	35.5
8	Adam Bishop	United Kingdom	2 in 16.63	2	18.5

== Final results ==
#	Athlete	Nation	Points
1st place, gold medalist(s)	Hafþór Björnsson	Iceland	35.5
2nd place, silver medalist(s)	Mateusz Kieliszkowski	Poland	31
3rd place, bronze medalist(s)	Konstantine Janashia	Georgia	28.5
4	Tom Stoltman	United Kingdom	26
5	Mikhail Shivlyakov	Russia	25.5
6	Luke Stoltman	United Kingdom	22.5
7	Mark Felix	United Kingdom	21
8	Adam Bishop	United Kingdom	18.5
9	Laurence Shahlaei	United Kingdom	11.5

Preceded by 2018 Europe's Strongest Man	Europe's Strongest Man	Succeeded by 2020 Europe's Strongest Man
