= Terry Hollands =

British bodybuilder and strongman

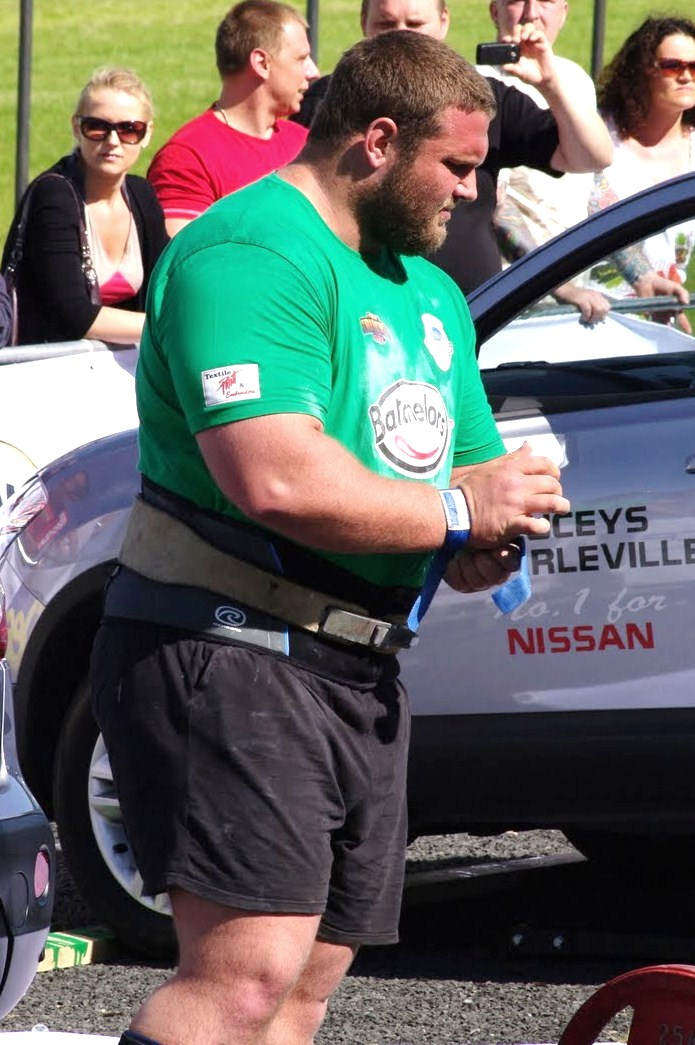
- Hollands in June 2010

Personal information
- Nicknames: Terry the Tank, Big Tel
- Nationality: (United Kingdom) British
- Born: 6 June 1979 (age 47) Dartford, Kent, England
- Occupations: Strength athlete, Coach
- Height: 1.98 m (6 ft 6 in)
- Weight: 135–195 kg (298–430 lb)
- Children: 1
Medal record
Strongman
Representing Great Britain
World's Strongest Man
Qualified	2005 World's Strongest Man
7th	2006 World's Strongest Man
3rd	2007 World's Strongest Man
10th	2008 World's Strongest Man
6th	2009 World's Strongest Man
8th	2010 World's Strongest Man
3rd	2011 World's Strongest Man
7th	2012 World's Strongest Man
7th	2013 World's Strongest Man
5th	2014 World's Strongest Man
Qualified	2016 World's Strongest Man
Qualified	2017 World's Strongest Man
Qualified	2018 World's Strongest Man
Qualified	2020 World's Strongest Man
Qualified	2021 World's Strongest Man
Arnold Strongman Classic
8th	2011 Arnold Strongman Classic
8th	2012 Arnold Strongman Classic
World's Ultimate Strongman
9th	2018 World's Ultimate Strongman
14th	2019 World's Ultimate Strongman
Shaw Classic
10th	2020 Shaw Classic
World's Strongest Viking
3rd	2014 World's Strongest Viking
Europe's Strongest Man
2nd	2010 Europe's Strongest Man
7th	2013 Europe's Strongest Man
5th	2016 Europe's Strongest Man
3rd	2017 Europe's Strongest Man
6th	2018 Europe's Strongest Man
11th	2020 Europe's Strongest Man
Strongman Super Series
3rd	2008 Mohegan Sun Grand Prix
Strongman Champions League
2nd	2009 Slovakia
2nd	2010 Iceman Challenge
2nd	2010 Germany
2nd	2010 Finland
1st	2010 Ireland tie w/Žydrūnas Savickas
3rd	2010 Bulgaria
2nd	2010 Slovakia
5th	2010 Ukraine
1st	2010 Overall Champion
2nd	2011 Germany
5th	2012 Germany FIBO
2nd	2012 Serbia
3rd	2012 Portugal
3rd	2012 Finland
3rd	2012 Gibraltar
6th	2013 Czech
Giants Live
13th	2019 Giants Live World Tour Finals
Jón Páll Sigmarsson Classic
4th	2010 Jón Páll Sigmarsson Classic
LA Fitexpo All American challenge
1st	2011 All American challenge
Official Strongman Games
1st	2019 World’s Strongest Masters
Representing England
UK's Strongest Man
1st	2005 UK's Strongest Man
2nd	2006 UK's Strongest Man
Britain's Strongest Man
3rd	2006 Britain's Strongest Man
1st	2007 Britain's Strongest Man
2nd	2008 Britain's Strongest Man
2nd	2012 Britain's Strongest Man
2nd	2013 Britain's Strongest Man
England's Strongest Man
2nd	2005 England's Strongest Man
1st	2009 England's Strongest Man
Iceland's Strongest Man
2nd	2007 Iceland's Strongest Man
Bodybuilding
1st	2019 2bros Pro Luke Sandoe Classic Beginners Class
2nd	2019 2bros Pro Luke Sandoe Classic Masters Class
2nd	2019 2bros Pro Luke Sandoe Classic Open Super-Heavyweight Class

Terry Hollands (born 6 June 1979) is a British amateur bodybuilder and a retired strongman competitor. He is most noted for achieving third place at the World's Strongest Man competition in 2007 and 2011.

He is also the winner of England's Strongest Man, Britain's Strongest Man and UK's Strongest Man competitions at the national circuit.

== Early life ==
Hollands was born in Dartford, Kent having a birth weight of 12 lbs 14oz. He was a keen sportsman in his childhood and teens, playing judo and rugby. However, despite sport being a big part of his life, he did not start serious gym training until he was 22 in order to help his rugby, and he typically focused on endurance training.

In 2004, he contracted a leg infection and on his return to the gym, focused on strongman training. His training schedule was described as "ferociously unforgiving" and he has espoused the benefits of visualization techniques saying "you can't get by without it".

== Career ==
=== Strongman ===
Hollands' career as a strongman began in 2005, coming second at the 2005 England's Strongest Man competition and winning 2005 UK's Strongest Man title. As a result, Hollands was invited for the 2005 World's Strongest Man competition, but he did not qualify for the finals.

In 2006, Hollands lost his UK's Strongest Man title to Glenn Ross but turned his attention to the Britain's Strongest Man competition. He also took part in the 2006 World's Strongest Man competition and qualified for the finals and placed seventh.

In 2007, Hollands regained his title of Britain's Strongest Man and returned to the 2007 World's Strongest Man and produced arguably the best performance of his career in the finals, placing third behind Mariusz Pudzianowski and Sebastian Wenta, becoming the first British competitor to achieve a podium finish since Gary Taylor in 1993.

The 2008 Britain's Strongest Man saw Hollands conceding his title to Jimmy Marku, winning second place. However, in the 2008 World's Strongest Man contest, he qualified for the final, coming second in his qualifying heat, but in a hugely talented field, he placed last out of the ten finalists.

In 2009, Hollands had a much improved showing in the 2009 World's Strongest Man final, eventually finishing sixth overall.

In 2010, Hollands had series of podium finishes in the Strongman Champions League, including a win in Ireland (tied with Žydrūnas Savickas). He placed second at the Europe's Strongest Man contest but injured his biceps in the process. a few months later he recovered from his injury and was able to compete at the 2010 World's Strongest Man contest where he made the final for the fifth consecutive year, and finished in 8th place. He ended the year by becoming the 2010 SCL overall winner.

At the 2011 World's Strongest Man competition, Hollands performed at a consistently high in all of the events to earn him his second podium finish at WSM, placing 3rd behind Brian Shaw and Žydrūnas Savickas. He also placed eighth at the Arnold Strongman Classic.

In the 2012 World's Strongest Man finals, Hollands withdrew from the final after tearing his left bicep during the natural stones event. He finished in 7th place. He also placed eighth again at the Arnold Strongman Classic and it was the last time he was selected.

In the 2014 World's Strongest Man competition, Hollands became the first man to have qualified for the final for nine consecutive years. He placed fifth in the overall competition. In the 2014 World's Strongest Viking, he secured third place behind the champion Hafþór Júlíus Björnsson and runner-up David Nyström.

In 2016 he was invited to the 2016 World's Strongest Man competition but failed to qualify for the finals.

In 2017, Hollands reached the podium at the 2017 Europe's Strongest Man, finishing in third behind Hafþór Júlíus Björnsson and Eddie Hall. He couldn't qualify for World's Strongest Man finals.

In 2018, he again failed to qualify for World's Strongest Man finals, getting eliminated at the group stage. He also emerged ninth at the inaugural World's Ultimate Strongman among a highly stacked field of 12 athletes.

In 2019, a lean Hollands placed thirteenth at Giants Live World Finals shortly after competing in his first bodybuilding show. In November, he won the 2019 World's Strongest Man Masters competition held at the Official Strongman Games in Daytona, Florida.

In 2020, he again failed to qualify for World's Strongest Man finals. He ended up tenth at the Shaw Classic and eleventh at the Europe's Strongest Man.

After withdrawing from the 2021 World's Strongest Man, after sustaining an injury and not being able to qualify to the finals for five consecutive years, Hollands announced his retirement from Strongman.

In a career which spanned seventeen years, he competed in more than 90 international competitions, winning 4 of them. With 12 international event wins, Hollands is also noted for his vehicle pulling skills, being the 8th best vehicle puller in strongman history. He was nicknamed Terry 'The Tank' Hollands or 'Big Tel'.

=== Bodybuilding ===
In 2017, Hollands began his weight loss transformation going from 195 kg to 147 kg with a 12% body fat by January 2018 when he placed third at Britain's Strongest Man – the lightest and the leanest he had ever been throughout his strongman career.

Hollands competed in his first bodybuilding contest in August 2019 placing 1st in the Beginners category (winning 2bros Pro Luke Sandoe Classic Beginners Class), 2nd in the Masters category, and 2nd in the Open Super Heavyweight category. He weighed 135 kg on stage with 5–6% body fat.

The performances qualified him for the 2bros Pro British Finals, but he did not compete and ended up being a strength and transformation coach.

== Personal records ==
Done in competition:

- Deadlift – 435 kg (959 lb) (Belt and wrist straps on Ironmind S cubed stiff bar at a 1-inch deficit) (2011 World's Strongest Man) (former joint-strongman deadlift record)
- Giant Barbell Squat (for reps) – 317.5 kg (700 lb) × 5 reps (single-ply suit w/ wraps) (2017 World's Strongest Man - Group 5)
- Log Press – 175 kg (386 lb) (2010 SCL Finland)
- Axle Press – 173 kg (381 lb) (2010 Europe's Strongest Man)
- Dumbbell Press – 116 kg (256 lb) (2012 Arnold Strongman Classic)
- Atlas Stone (for reps) – 205 kg (452 lb) x 2 reps over 4 ft bar (2011 Arnold Strongman Classic)
- Atlas stones – 130–180 kg (287–397 lb) 5 stones set in 18.02 seconds (2010 Giants Live South Africa)
- Frame carry (with straps) – 340 kg (750 lb) 40m course in 18.21 seconds (2013 SCL Portugal) (World Record)
- Farmer's walk (raw grip) – 150 kg (331 lb) in each hand 40m course in 16.99 seconds (2012 SCL Portugal) (World Record)
- Arm over arm truck pull – 20,000 kg (44,092 lb) for 16.15 metres (53 ft 0 in) (2017 SCL Canada) (World Record)
- Truck pull (no harness/ rope only) – 7,500 kg (16,535 lb) for 40 meter course in 60.55 seconds (2006 Britain's Strongest Man) (World Record)
- Bus pull – 24,500 kg (54,013 lb) for 25 meter course 'uphill' in 42.97 seconds (2012 World's Strongest Man) (World Record)

Done in training:

- Deadlift – 450 kg (992 lb)
- Log lift – 192.5 kg (424 lb)
- Front squat – 300 kg (661 lb)
- Bench press – 255 kg (562 lb)

== Personal life ==
In 2025, Hollands married Norwegian personal trainer and nutrition coach Pernille Bekken Helgesen.

He was previously married to English burlesque dancer and IFBB pro Kate Errington. Hollands has a son, Zachary Edward David Hollands from a previous relationship with Lorenzo Mingus.

Preceded by Oli Thompson	Britain's Strongest Man; 2007	Succeeded by Jimmy Marku
Preceded by Glenn Ross	UK's Strongest Man; 2005	Succeeded by Glenn Ross
