= 2018 World's Strongest Man =

Strongman competition in 2018

Competition information
- Dates: 28 April - 6 May 2018
- Location: Manila
- Country: Philippines
- Athletes participating: 30
- Nations participating: 15

Champion(s)
- (Iceland) Hafþór Júlíus Björnsson

The 2018 World's Strongest Man was the 41st edition of the World's Strongest Man competition held in Manila, Philippines from April 28 to May 6, and was won by Hafþór Júlíus Björnsson the first Icelander since Magnús Ver Magnússon in 1996 to win the title. Mateusz Kieliszkowski of Poland finished second and four-time winner Brian Shaw of the United States third. Notably, this would be the final appearance of Žydrūnas Savickas at World's Strongest Man; after reaching the finals, he was forced to withdraw after three events and ultimately came in last place.

The qualifying phase lasted until May 1 while the finals took place on May 5 and 6 while various World's Strongest Man events were hosted within and outside Metro Manila. Among the venues were the Quirino Grandstand in Rizal Park; Intramuros, Manila; Bonifacio Global City in Taguig; and the University of the Philippines campus in Diliman, Quezon City. Events outside Metro Manila were hosted in Bataan, Corregidor Island, Coron Island, Davao City, and Tagaytay.

== Participants ==
- Hafþór Júlíus Björnsson (Iceland)
- Matjaz Belsak (Slovenia)
- Marius Lalas (Lithuania)
- Laurence Shahlaei (United Kingdom)
- Peiman Maheripour (Iran)
- Rob Kearney (United States)
- Brian Shaw (United States)
- Johan Els (South Africa)
- Adam Bishop (United Kingdom)
- Adam Derks (United States)
- Johnny Hansson (Sweden)
- Paul Smith (United Kingdom)
- Žydrūnas Savickas (Lithuania)
- Robert Oberst (United States)
- Luke Stoltman (United Kingdom)
- Bryan Benzel (United States)
- Graham Hicks (United Kingdom)
- Dennis Kohlruss (Germany)
- Martins Licis (United States)
- Jean-François Caron (Canada)
- Mark Felix (United Kingdom)
- Krzysztof Radzikowski (Poland)
- Martin Forsmark (Sweden)
- Rongo Keene (Australia)
- Mateusz Kieliszkowski (Poland)
- Konstantine Janashia (Georgia (country))
- Mikhail Shivlyakov (Russia)
- Aivars Šmaukstelis (Latvia)
- Terry Hollands (United Kingdom)
- Nick Best (United States)

== Heat Results ==
The qualifying heats consisted of six events. After five events, the competitor with the highest score qualifies for the final. The competitors in second and third place take part in the final event, the Atlas Stones, with the winner progressing.

=== Heat 1 ===
#	Name	Nationality	Pts
1	Hafþór Júlíus Björnsson	Iceland	22.5
2	Marius Lalas	Lithuania	19.5
3	Matjaz Belsak	Slovenia	19
4	Laurence Shahlaei	United Kingdom	19
5	Peiman Maheripour	Iran	15
6	Rob Kearney	United States	10

Atlas Stones

Name	Nationality	Time (sec)
Matjaz Belsak	Slovenia	5 in 37.23
Marius Lalas	Lithuania	3 in 25.13

=== Heat 2 ===
#	Name	Nationality	Pts
1	Brian Shaw	United States	25.5
2	Adam Bishop	United Kingdom	20.5
3	Johan Els	South Africa	19.5
4	Adam Derks	United States	17.5
5	Johnny Hansson	Sweden	14.5
6	Paul Smith	United Kingdom	6.5

Atlas Stones

Name	Nationality	Time (sec)
Johan Els	South Africa	5 in 32.16
Adam Bishop	United Kingdom	3 in 29.98

=== Heat 3 ===
#	Name	Nationality	Pts
1	Žydrūnas Savickas	Lithuania	22
2	Robert Oberst	United States	21
3	Luke Stoltman	United Kingdom	19
4	Bryan Benzel	United States	17
5	Graham Hicks	United Kingdom	17
6	Dennis Kohlruss	Germany	9

Atlas Stones

Name	Nationality	Time (sec)
Robert Oberst	United States	5 in 33.05
Luke Stoltman	United Kingdom	4 in 24.65

=== Heat 4 ===
#	Name	Nationality	Pts
1	Martins Licis	United States	25.5
2	Mark Felix	United Kingdom	21
3	Jean-François Caron	Canada	19.5
4	Krzysztof Radzikowski	Poland	17.5
5	Martin Forsmark	Sweden	12.5
6	Rongo Keene	Australia	8

Atlas Stones

Name	Nationality	Time (sec)
Jean-François Caron	Canada	5 in 39.53
Mark Felix	United Kingdom	4 in 28.12

=== Heat 5 ===
#	Name	Nationality	Pts
1	Mateusz Kieliszkowski	Poland	26
2	Mikhail Shivlyakov	Russia	22
3	Konstantine Janashia	Georgia	19.5
4	Aivars Šmaukstelis	Latvia	16
5	Terry Hollands	United Kingdom	11
6	Nick Best	United States	10.5

Atlas Stones

Name	Nationality	Time (sec)
Konstantine Janashia	Georgia	5 in 29.99
Mikhail Shivlyakov	Russia	5 in 36.65

== Finals Events Results ==
=== Event 1: Frame Carry ===
- Weight: 370 kilograms (820 lb)
- Course Length: 30 metres (98 ft)
- Time Limit: 60 seconds

#	Name	Nationality	Time (sec)	Event Pts	Overall Pts
1	Mateusz Kieliszkowski	Poland	18.93	10	10
2	Brian Shaw	United States	21.72	9	9
3	Konstantine Janashia	Georgia	30.96	8	8
4	Hafþór Júlíus Björnsson	Iceland	32.53	7	7
5	Martins Licis	United States	DNF (26.55 m)	6	6
6	JF Caron	Canada	DNF (18.45 m)	5	5
7	Robert Oberst	United States	DNF (12.05 m)	4	4
8	Johan Els	South Africa	DNF (9.55 m)	3	3
9	Matjaz Belsak	Slovenia	DNF (5.30 m)	2	2
10	Žydrūnas Savickas	Lithuania	DNF (5.05 m)	1	1

=== Event 2: Car Deadlift ===
- Weight: 386 kilograms (851 lb) for repetitions
- Time Limit: 60 seconds

#	Name	Nationality	Repetitions	Event Pts	Overall Pts
1	Hafþór Júlíus Björnsson	Iceland	12	9.5	16.5
1	Brian Shaw	United States	12	9.5	18.5
3	JF Caron	Canada	11	8	13
4	Martins Licis	United States	10	7	13
5	Konstantine Janashia	Georgia	7	6	14
6	Matjaz Belsak	Slovenia	6	5	7
7	Johan Els	South Africa	5	4	5
8	Žydrūnas Savickas	Lithuania	3	2.5	3.5
8	Mateusz Kieliszkowski	Poland	3	2.5	12.5
10	Robert Oberst	United States	0	0	4

=== Event 3: Max Overhead Press ===
- Starting Weight: 175 kilograms (386 lb)

#	Name	Nationality	Weight Lifted	Event Pts	Overall Pts
1	Hafþór Júlíus Björnsson	Iceland	205 kg (452 lb)	10	26.5
2	Mateusz Kieliszkowski	Poland	200 kg (441 lb)	8.5	21
2	Martins Licis	United States	200 kg (441 lb)	8.5	21.5
4	Brian Shaw	United States	190 kg (419 lb)	5.5	24
4	Robert Oberst	United States	190 kg (419 lb)	5.5	9.5
4	Žydrūnas Savickas (Note: Savickas was injured during his 200 kg (440 lb) attempt and took no further part in the competition.)	Lithuania	190 kg (419 lb)	5.5	9
4	Matjaz Belsak	Slovenia	190 kg (419 lb)	5.5	12.5
8	JF Caron	Canada	175 kg (386 lb)	3	16
9	Johan Els	South Africa	N/A	0	7
9	Konstantine Janashia	Georgia	N/A	0	14

=== Event 4: Bus Pull ===
- Weight: 28,000 kilograms (62,000 lb)
- Course Length: 25 metres (82 ft)
- Time Limit: 60 seconds

#	Name	Nationality	Time (sec)	Event Pts	Overall Pts
1	Mateusz Kieliszkowski	Poland	35.95	10	31
2	Hafþór Júlíus Björnsson	Iceland	36.06	9	35.5
3	Matjaz Belsak	Slovenia	36.75	8	20.5
4	Brian Shaw	United States	36.76	7	31
5	Martins Licis	United States	38.95	6	27.5
6	Johan Els	South Africa	40.25	5	12
7	JF Caron	Canada	41.00	4	20
8	Robert Oberst	United States	41.10	3	12.5
9	Konstantine Janashia	Georgia	43.20	2	16

=== Event 5: Loading Race ===
- Weight: 105 kilograms (231 lb) anchor, 125 kilograms (276 lb) anvil, 120 kilograms (260 lb) keg, 150 kilograms (330 lb) sand bag, and a 120 kilograms (260 lb) safe
- Course Length: 10 metres (33 ft)
- Time Limit: 75 seconds

#	Name	Nationality	Time	Event Pts	Overall Pts
1	Hafþór Júlíus Björnsson	Iceland	5 in 0m 31.22	10	45.5
2	Mateusz Kieliszkowski	Poland	5 in 0m 33.60	9	40
3	Johan Els	South Africa	5 in 0m 34.12	8	20
4	JF Caron	Canada	5 in 0m 40.61	7	27
5	Brian Shaw	United States	5 in 0m 43.34	6	37
6	Robert Oberst	United States	5 in 0m 44.98	5	17.5
7	Matjaz Belsak	Slovenia	5 in 0m 52.56	4	24.5
8	Konstantine Janashia	Georgia	5 in 0m 52.92	3	19
9	Martins Licis	United States	4 in 0m 37.67	2	29.5

=== Event 6: Atlas Stones ===
- Weight: 5 Atlas Stone series ranging from 150–210 kilograms (330–460 lb)
- Time Limit: 60 seconds

#	Name	Nationality	Time (sec)	Event Pts	Overall Pts
1	Johan Els	South Africa	5 in 41.44	10	30
2	Martins Licis	United States	4 in 24.97	9	38.5
3	JF Caron	Canada	4 in 33.59	8	35
4	Brian Shaw	United States	4 in 39.11	7	44
5	Hafþór Júlíus Björnsson	Iceland	4 in 40.36	6	51.5
6	Mateusz Kieliszkowski	Poland	4 in 41.64	5	45
7	Robert Oberst	United States	3 in 24.15	4	21.5
8	Matjaz Belsak	Slovenia	3 in 37.67	3	27.5
9	Konstantine Janashia	Georgia	3 in 44.78	2	21

== Final standings ==
#	Name	Nationality	Pts
1st place, gold medalist(s)	Hafþór Júlíus Björnsson	Iceland	51.5
2nd place, silver medalist(s)	Mateusz Kieliszkowski	Poland	45
3rd place, bronze medalist(s)	Brian Shaw	United States	44
4	Martins Licis	United States	38.5
5	Jean-François Caron	Canada	35
6	Johan Els	South Africa	30
7	Matjaz Belsak	Slovenia	27.5
8	Robert Oberst	United States	21.5
9	Konstantine Janashia	Georgia	21.0
10	Žydrūnas Savickas	Lithuania	9 (Injured)

Preceded by 2017 World's Strongest Man	2018 World's Strongest Man	Succeeded by 2019 World's Strongest Man
