= Konstantine Janashia =

Georgian strongman (born 1990)

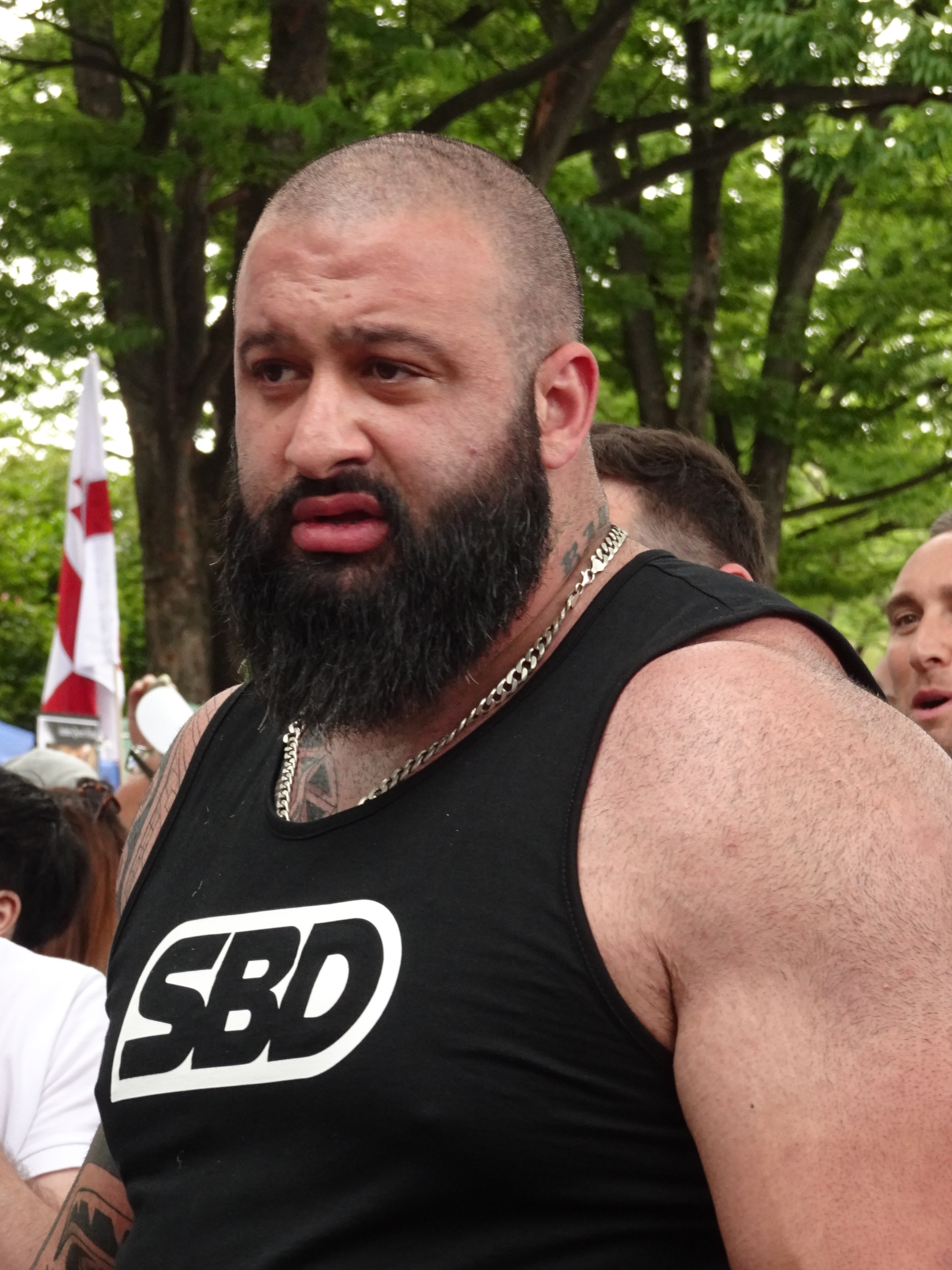
- On 15 June 2024 in Tokyo, Japan

Personal information
- Nickname: The Georgian Bull
- Nationality: Georgian
- Born: 30 August 1990 (age 36) Georgia
- Height: 6 ft 5 in (196 cm)
- Weight: 375 lb (170 kg)

Sport
- Sport: Strongman
Medal record
Strongman
Representing Georgia
World's Strongest Man
4th	2016 World's Strongest Man
8th	2017 World's Strongest Man
9th	2018 World's Strongest Man
10th	2019 World's Strongest Man
6th	2021 World's Strongest Man
Qualified	2022 World's Strongest Man
Qualified	2023 World's Strongest Man
Europe's Strongest Man
4th	2017 Europe's Strongest Man
2nd	2018 Europe's Strongest Man
3rd	2019 Europe's Strongest Man
3rd	2022 Europe's Strongest Man
8th	2023 Europe's Strongest Man
12th	2024 Europe's Strongest Man
World's Ultimate Strongman
6th	2018 World's Ultimate Strongman
14th	2020 World's Ultimate Strongman
5th	2021 World's Ultimate Strongman
Arnold Pro Strongman World Series
5th	2017 Europe
7th	2022 UK
Shaw Classic
10th	2021 Shaw Classic
9th	2022 Shaw Classic
Siberian Power Show
1st	2021 Siberian Power Show
Georgia's Strongest Man
1st	2009 Georgia's Strongest Man
1st	2010 Georgia's Strongest Man
1st	2011 Georgia's Strongest Man
1st	2012 Georgia's Strongest Man
1st	2013 Georgia's Strongest Man
1st	2014 Georgia's Strongest Man

Konstantine Janashia (Georgian: კონსტანტინე ჯანაშია; born 30 August 1990) is a professional strongman from Georgia. He is a six time Georgia's Strongest Man, three time podium finisher at Europe's Strongest Man, and in 2016, Janashia became the first Georgian to reach the World's Strongest Man final, where he placed fourth.

== Career ==
Janashia started his sporting career in rugby and was part of the local junior team. He started weightlifting at the age of 18 and would soon receive an invite to his first strongman contest from his national federation after noticing his size and strength.

In August 2016, Janashia made his first appearance at the World's Strongest Man competition. He made it past the qualifying heats to the finals and placed fourth overall in the competition.

In April 2017, Janashia made his first appearance at Europe's Strongest Man, where he placed fourth. In May 2017, he returned to the World's Strongest Man competition, where he again made the finals and placed eighth overall. In September 2017, he took part in the World Deadlift Championships as part of the Giants Live Tour Final. He pulled 400 kg (880 lb) for 5 reps, with JF Caron matching him. He would go on to place second overall in the Tour Final.

In April 2018, Janashia returned to Europe's Strongest Man and placed second behind Hafthor Bjornsson. Later that month, he competed at the 2018 World's Strongest Man competition and placed ninth overall.

In April 2019, Janashia competed at the 2019 Europe's Strongest Man competition and set a new Georgian Record in the Log Lift, lifting 202.5 kg (446 lb). He placed third in the overall competition. In June 2019, he competed at the 2019 World's Strongest Man competition and made it to the finals. However, he had to withdraw due to a triceps tear, settling for tenth place.

In September 2020, Janashia took part in the second season of the World's Ultimate Strongman Feats of Strength series against Rauno Heinla to break the Deadlift for Repetitions record, with the record standing at 400 kg (880 lb) for 5 reps. However, Janashia only managed to pull 2 reps while Heinla broke the record by pulling 6 reps. In November 2020, Janashia was unable to compete at the 2020 World's Strongest Man competition due to testing positive for COVID-19.

== Personal records ==
Done in official strongman competition:

- Deadlift (with straps and suit) – 400 kg (880 lb) for 5 reps (2017 World Deadlift Championships)
- Deadlift (with straps and suit) – 440 kg (970 lb) for One Rep Max (2017 World's Strongest Man)
- Giant Barbell Squat (for reps) – 317.5 kg (700 lb) × 2 reps (single-ply suit w/ wraps) (2017 World's Strongest Man)
- Log Lift – 202.5 kg (446 lb) (2019 Europe's Strongest Man)
- Keg Toss – 7.26 m (23.8 ft) (2021 World's Strongest Man)
- 18-Inch Deadlift (with straps and suit) – 510 kg (1,120 lb) (2018 World's Ultimate Strongman)
- Hummer Tire Deadlift (with straps and suit) – 456 kg (1,005 lb) (2021 Shaw Classic)
- Axle Press – 180 kg (400 lb) (2017 Europe's Strongest Man)

== See also ==
- List of strongmen
