= Luke Stoltman =

Scottish strongman (born 1984)

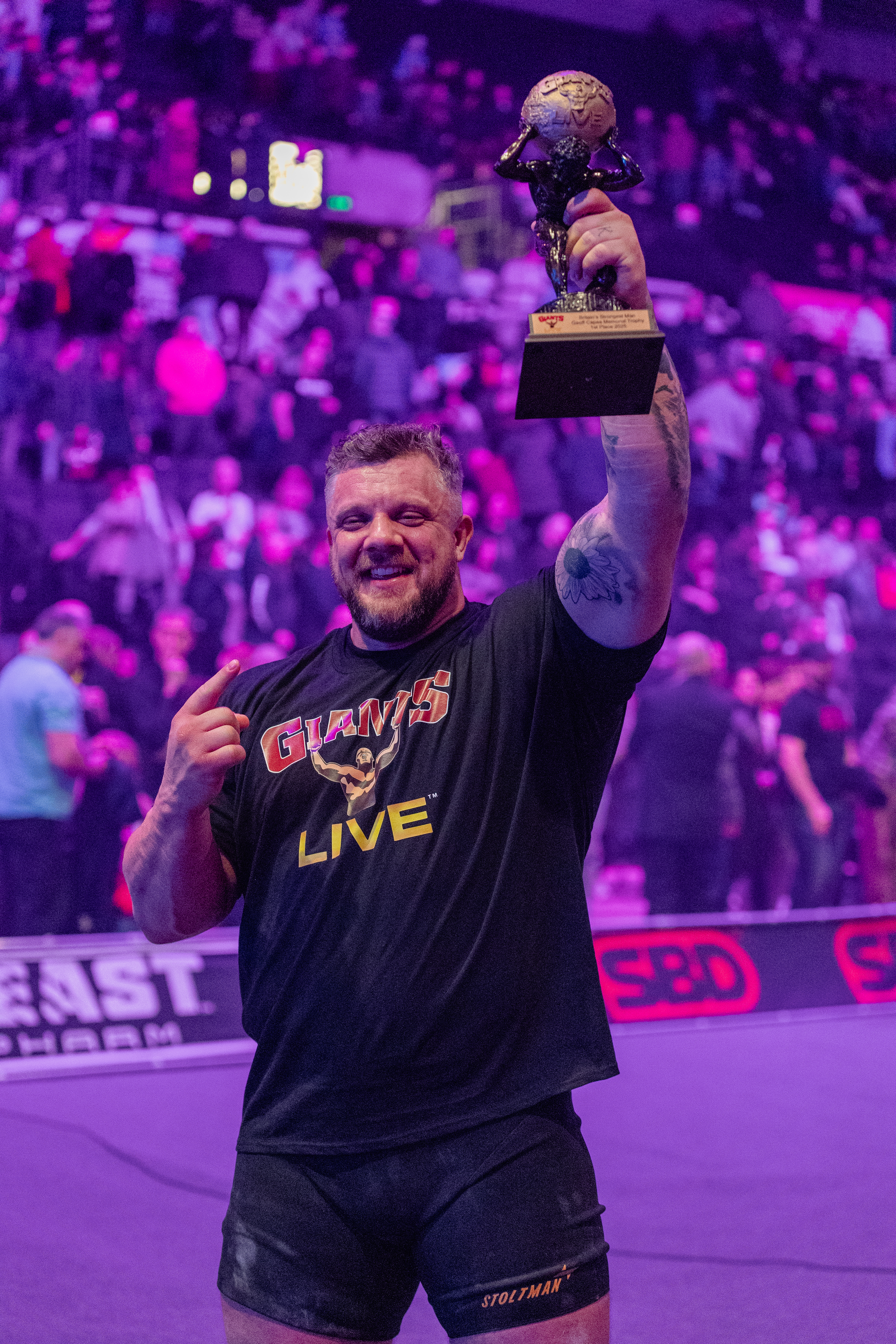
- Stoltman at Britain's Strongest Man 2025

Personal information
- Nickname: The Highland Oak
- Born: 22 November 1984 (age 41) Invergordon, Scotland
- Height: 6 ft 3.5 in (1.92 m)
- Weight: 144–162 kg (317–357 lb)
- Spouse: Kushi Stoltman (m. 2016; div. 2024)
- Website: stoltmanbrothers.com

YouTube information
- Channel: Stoltman Brothers
- Years active: 2019–present
- Genre: Strength Training/Strongman
- Subscribers: 288 thousand
- Views: 71.91 million
- Last updated: 10 July 2026

Sport
- Sport: Strongman
Medal record
Strongman
Representing United Kingdom
World's Strongest Man
Qualified	2016 World's Strongest Man
Qualified	2017 World's Strongest Man
Qualified	2018 World's Strongest Man
7th	2019 World's Strongest Man
Qualified	2020 World's Strongest Man
7th	2021 World's Strongest Man
7th	2022 World's Strongest Man
8th	2023 World's Strongest Man
9th	2024 World's Strongest Man
9th	2025 World's Strongest Man
Arnold Strongman Classic
3rd	2022 Arnold Strongman Classic
9th	2023 Arnold Strongman Classic
Shaw Classic
7th	2020 Shaw Classic
15th	2022 Shaw Classic
13th	2023 Strongest Man on Earth
Rogue Invitational
8th	2021 Rogue Invitational
8th	2023 Rogue Invitational
5th	2024 Rogue Invitational
World's Ultimate Strongman
11th	2018 World's Ultimate Strongman
2nd	2019 World's Ultimate Strongman
4th	2021 World's Ultimate Strongman
Europe's Strongest Man
7th	2015 Europe's Strongest Man
7th	2017 Europe's Strongest Man
6th	2019 Europe's Strongest Man
1st	2021 Europe's Strongest Man
2nd	2022 Europe's Strongest Man
1st	2024 Europe's Strongest Man
11th	2025 Europe's Strongest Man
Giants Live
9th	2014 Poland
4th	2019 Wembley
10th	2019 World Tour Finals
6th	2021 Strongman Classic
1st	2021 World Tour Finals
9th	2021 Arnold Strongman UK
6th	2023 Strongman Classic
5th	2023 World Open
5th	2023 World Tour Finals
5th	2024 US Strongman Championship
4th	2024 World Tour Finals
6th	2025 World Open
11th	2026 World Tour Finals
Strongman Champions League
7th	2015 SCL Fibo
8th	2015 SCL Holland
Magnús Ver Magnússon Strongman Classic
3rd	2024 MVM Strongman Classic
Representing Scotland
Britain's Strongest Man
9th	2013 Britain's Strongest Man
7th	2014 Britain's Strongest Man
6th	2015 Britain's Strongest Man
7th	2016 Britain's Strongest Man
4th	2017 Britain's Strongest Man
6th	2018 Britain's Strongest Man
4th	2019 Britain's Strongest Man
3rd	2020 Britain's Strongest Man
4th	2021 Britain's Strongest Man
10th	2022 Britain's Strongest Man
3rd	2024 Britain's Strongest Man
1st	2025 Britain's Strongest Man
6th	2026 Britain's Strongest Man
Scotland's Strongest Man
1st	2013 Scotland's Strongest Man
1st	2014 Scotland's Strongest Man
1st	2015 Scotland's Strongest Man
1st	2016 Scotland's Strongest Man
1st	2017 Scotland's Strongest Man
2nd	2018 Scotland's Strongest Man
2nd	2019 Scotland's Strongest Man
Iceland's Strongest Man
3rd	2019 Iceland's Strongest Man

Luke Bernard Stoltman (born 22 November 1984) is a Scottish strongman. He is a two times winner of the Europe's Strongest Man competition in 2021 and 2024, and an entrant to the World's Strongest Man competition, having reached the finals six times with a best placing of seventh place. He has also won the Britain's Strongest Man competition in 2025, and Scotland's Strongest Man competition five times at the national circuit.

Renowned for his overhead lifting power, Luke held the British log lift record at 221 kg (487 lb) from 2020 to 2025. Along with his younger brother, Tom Stoltman, the two are widely regarded as the strongest brothers in history and are the only ones to both qualify for the World's Strongest Man finals; a feat they have managed six times.

== Early life ==
Born in Invergordon, Ross and Cromarty, Luke was the first of five children for parents Ben and Sheila. Luke attended Newmore Primary School and Invergordon Academy and was an avid footballer in his early years before moving his focus to weight training by the age of 15 inspired by a family photo of his grandfather, a Polish war refugee, carrying a log the same size as his body. Luke left school aged 16 and followed his father's footsteps into the oil industry training as a dimensional surveyor before taking his first offshore based job aged 18. Throughout his early twenties, Luke's training consisted of predominantly bodybuilder type programs, influenced by the likes of Jay Cutler and Ronnie Coleman; although he was often limited by the gym equipment available on the oil rigs he worked on.

== Career ==
Luke later became more interested in the strength aspect of his training, entering, and winning his first contest, a local deadlift competition in 2011 aged 27. This led to him participating in the 'Highlands Strongest Man' in 2012, held in a gym car park in Inverness, where he again placed first.

A relative late comer to the sport, Luke's performance in local competitions convinced him to pursue strongman training seriously alongside a full-time job working on oil rigs. In 2013, Luke competed in his first UK's Strongest Man, where he placed 7th. He then went on to secure 5 consecutive Scotland's Strongest Man titles from 2013 – 2017, and consistently improved his Britain's Strongest Man (BSM) placing each year, reaching 4th by 2017.

A debut at World's Strongest Man came in 2016, after a solid performance at Europe's Strongest Man the previous year, though Luke failed to reach the final after a 3rd place finish in his heat. The following year (2017) he again improved on his BSM placing (4th) and at WSM he narrowly missed a place in the final, finishing 3rd in his heat behind future WSM champions Hafthor Bjornsson and Martins Licis.

At this stage in Luke's career, although he was steadily improving his strength, it was not reflected in his contest results. In 2018, he again missed out on a World's Strongest Man Final qualification, losing out to four time WSM winner Zydrunas Savickas and Robert Oberst in the heats, and placing a disappointing 6th at BSM. Luke's job, where he would work offshore for two to three weeks at a time on oil rigs without access to the suitable strongman training equipment, was seen to be hampering his preparation for competition.

In 2019 Luke took the leap into full-time training, leaving his job in the oil and gas industry to focus solely on fulfilling his potential as a world level strongman competitor. This decision was helped by placing second at the 2019 World's Ultimate Strongman International. This led to a significant breakthrough as he qualified for the WSM final in his first year as a professional, finishing 7th overall alongside younger brother Tom, who placed 5th. The pair were the first brothers to ever reach the final at WSM, and an achievement that gained them the moniker 'The World's Strongest Brothers'.

2020 brought Luke's first podium finish at BSM. However with training and competition hampered by the COVID-19 outbreak, Luke was unable to enter Europe's Strongest Man, and failed to qualify from his heat at the WSM finals. That same year however, Luke established a British record in the log press, completing a 221 kg (487 lb) lift at World Ultimate Strongman's "Feats of Strength" showcase. Disappointment at World's was short-lived, as 2021 proved to be Luke's best year to date. At the age of 36, Luke took the title of Europe's Strongest Man. He followed this by taking first place at the Giants Live World Tour Finals. At WSM that year, he was close to a podium position, though a poor performance in the final event led to him slipping from 3rd to 7th, repeating his 2019 result, whilst brother Tom lifted the winner's trophy.

In 2022 Luke gained a podium finish at the Arnold Strongman Classic in Ohio in March, taking 3rd place behind Martin Licis and Oleksii Novikov. Luke narrowly missed out on retaining his Europe's Strongest Man crown, finishing a second to WSM 2020 winner, Oleksii Novikov. At Worlds Strongest Man 2022, held in Sacramento, California, Luke won his heat by a considerable margin allowing him to qualify for the final with an event to spare. In the finals, Luke again finished 7th in a line up that contained four previous winners. The competition was won by younger brother Tom for the second year in a row.

After some time away from competing in the later half of 2023, Stoltman returned to compete at the 2023 Arnold Strongman Classic, where he placed 9th. This was followed by an 8th place finish at WSM and the Rogue Invitational. Luke started working with a new coach late 2023, and saw improvements in his placings with a 3rd place finish at the 2024 Britain's Strongest Man final, followed by winning Europe's Strongest Man for the second time. Stoltman qualified again for the World's Strongest Man Final in May 2024, where ultimately he placed 9th. The competition was won by his younger brother Tom Stoltman for a third time.

A bicep injury sustained at the WSM final kept Luke out of competition for several months, returning strongly with a 5th place position at the US Strongman Championship, 4th place at the Giant's Live World Tour Finals, and notably a 5th place finish at the Rogue Invitational, where he was only beaten by the podium finishers of the 2024 WSM final plus 2018 WSM winner, Hafþór Júlíus Björnsson.

Luke started the 2025 strongman season by winning Britain's Strongest Man for the first time.

== Family and personal life ==
Luke is the eldest of five siblings, all of whom live in and around their hometown of Invergordon close to their father, Ben. Luke's youngest brother Harry works for the Stoltman Brothers business and is currently training to compete in strongman competition.

Luke married wife Kushi Roberts in 2016 at a ceremony in Kincraig Castle Hotel, near Invergordon. Together they have a son named Koa. The marriage came to an end in 2024 when Kushi publicly accused Luke of infidelity with fellow strongwoman athlete Melissa Peacock. Since the divorce, Luke has continued his relationship with Melissa.

Luke's mother Shiela died aged 56 in 2016. Both Luke and Tom regularly cite their mother's influence as key to inspiring them to succeed in their careers.

In 2021 a permanent tribute to Luke and brother Tom was installed by Invergordon Community Council in their hometown, where the signs at the entrances to Invergordon were updated to include their names and achievements. The sign reads 'Welcome to Invergordon Hometown of the Stoltman Brothers World, European and UK Strongest Men'.

Luke is a strong advocate for mental health and regularly speaks out on the topic and about how he benefited from speaking to a therapist after the death of his mother. Luke has worked as an ambassador for mental health charity Mikeysline.

== Other ventures ==
=== Gym ===
In 2018, Luke and Tom opened a commercial gym, The Stoltman Strength Centre, in Invergordon. This was originally a joint venture with another party though is now fully owned by the Stoltman Brothers Ltd. Luke was quoted as saying he had always wanted to open his own gym to inspire others. The brothers use the facility for the majority of their training, having originally trained in Luke's home gym in his garage. In 2023 the brothers announced a partnership with Glasgow based commercial strength equipment brand Primal. As part of the deal, the Stoltman Strength Centre received a significant upgrade and redesign to become a state of the art facility.

=== Health and fitness brand ===
As the popularity of the brothers has risen through their achievements and media presence, they began to sell Stoltman Brothers branded merchandise via an online shop www.stoltmanbrothers.com. Original offerings were primarily focused around images of the brothers; however this has now been built up to include more everyday 'lifestyle' clothing with Stoltman branding, 'motivational' apparel featuring some of the company/brothers' values and quotes, and a collaboration with other strongmen where t-shirts with the athletes images are produced. All clothing is sold via the Stoltman brothers website and via their shop which they opened in Invergordon in 2022.

=== Stoltman Strength Academy ===
The Stoltman brothers in 2022 set up their own strength training academy.

=== Media ===
Together with brother Tom, Luke has a YouTube channel, Stoltman Brothers, through which they show training and competition footage, partake in various challenges, and provide an insight to everyday life for professional strongmen athletes. The brothers regularly collaborate on the channel with other well known health and fitness personalities and YouTubers, with Eddie Hall, Matt Does Fitness, Hafþór Júlíus Björnsson and Larry Wheels all having featured.

The brothers are also the subject of a documentary which is currently in production. Footage for which has been shot by Mulligan Brothers Studio and documents the brothers rise to prominence as elite level strongmen athletes and inspirational figures.

=== Publications ===
In 2023 Luke and Tom released their own autobiography 'Lifting: Becoming the World's Strongest Brothers' which details their story from childhood through to present day, the hardback version of the book was published by Penguin Random House.

Luke and Tom both feature and narrate in Coach Mike Chadwick's The Red On Revolution book, published in 2022.

== Personal records ==
In competition:

- Deadlift (with suit and straps) – 400 kg (882 lb) (2023 and 2025 World Deadlift Championships)
- Elephant bar Deadlift (Raw with straps) – 383.5 kg (845 lb) (2021 Rogue Invitational)
- Hummer Tire Deadlift (15 inches from the floor) – 422 kg (930 lb) (2020 Shaw Classic)
- Double T Squat (with suit) – 370 kg (816 lb) (2022 Arnold Strongman Classic)
- Giant Barbell Squat (for reps) – 340 kg (750 lb) × 5 reps (single-ply suit w/ wraps) (2019 World's Strongest Man)
- Log press – 221 kg (487 lb) (2020 World's Ultimate Strongman, Feats of Strength series) (former national record)
- Axle press – 190 kg (419 lb) (2024 World's Strongest Man)
- Flintstone barbell push press (behind the neck) – 212 kg (467 lb) (2022 World's Strongest Man)
- Arm over arm vertical lift (flag hoist) – 100 kg (220 lb) 6m height x 4 times in 41.28 seconds (2021 World's Ultimate Strongman Strength Island) (World Record)

During training:

- Squat – 380 kg (838 lb)
- Bench press – 240 kg (529 lb)
- Log press – 228.5 kg (504 lb)

== Competitive record ==
Winning percentage: 6.82%
Podium percentage: 18.18%

	1st	2nd	3rd	Podium	4th	5th	6th	7th	8th	9th	10th	11th	12th	13th	14th	15th	17th	Total
International competitions	3	2	3	8	2	4	4	7	4	5	1	3	1	1	1	2	1	44

== Filmography ==
=== Television ===
Year	Title	Role	Notes
2016–2025	World's Strongest Man	Himself – Competitor	
2025	The Traitors	Masked Bodyguard	Series 3, Episode 6
2025	Blue Peter	Guest	
2026	Battle of the Beasts	Himself – Competitor	
