= Matjaz Belsak =

Slovenian strongman

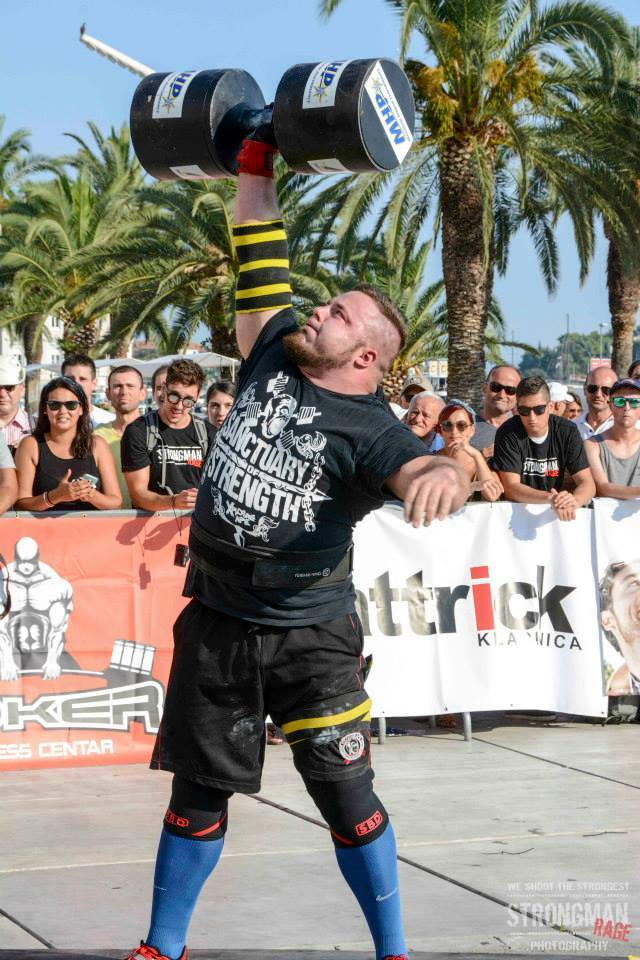

Personal information
- Native name: Matjaž Belšak
- Born: 23 September 1992 (age 33) Slovenia
- Height: 6 ft 1.5 in (187 cm)
- Weight: 330–335 lb (150–152 kg)

Sport
- Sport: Strongman
Medal record
Representing Slovenia
World's Strongest Man
| Qualified | 2015 World's Strongest Man |
| 9th | 2016 World's Strongest Man |
| Qualified | 2017 World's Strongest Man |
| 7th | 2018 World's Strongest Man |
Arnold Strongman Classic
| 6th | 2018 Arnold Strongman Classic |
| 5th | 2019 Arnold Strongman Classic |
| 10th | 2020 Arnold Strongman Classic |
World's Ultimate Strongman
| 9th | Beasts of the Middle East 2019 |
Europe's Strongest Man
| 5th | 2015 Europe's Strongest Man |
| 6th | 2017 Europe's Strongest Man |
| 7th | 2018 Europe's Strongest Man |
World's Strongest Viking
| 2nd | 2016 World's Strongest Viking |
Arnold Strongman Classic Europe
| 4th | 2016 Arnold Europe |
| 1st | 2017 Arnold Europe |
| 2nd | 2018 Arnold Europe |
| 9th | 2019 Arnold Europe |
Arnold Strongman Classic Canada
| 4th | 2017 Arnold Canada |
| Qualified | 2018 Arnold Canada |
| 5th | 2019 Arnold Canada |
Arnold Strongman Classic - Other
| 1st | 2017 Arnold Poland |
| 4th | 2018 Arnold Australia |
| 4th | 2019 Arnold Los Angeles |
| 2nd | 2019 Arnold Australia |
| 4th | 2019 Arnold Brasil |
| 8th | 2019 Arnold Africa |
Giants Live
| 4th | 2018 Giants Live |
Strongman Champions League
| 5th | 2013 SCL FIBO Germany |
| 3rd | 2014 SCL Hungary |
| 4th | 2015 SCL Bulgaria |
| 4th | 2015 SCL Croatia |
| 7th | 2015 SCL Poland |
| 3rd | 2015 SCL Austria |
| 3rd | 2015 SCL Lithuania |
| 3rd | 2015 SCL Martinique |
| 5th | 2015 SCL FINALS - Turkey |
| 2nd | 2016 SCL FIBO Germany |
| 7th | 2016 SCL Latvia |
| 3rd | 2016 SCL Serbia |
| 2nd | 2016 SCL Bulgaria |
| 4th | 2016 SCL Portugal |
| 3rd | 2016 SCL FINALS - Dubai |
| 1st | 2017 SCL FIBO Germany |
| 1st | 2017 SCL Holand |
| 1st | 2017 SCL Serbia |
| 1st | 2017 SCL Finland |
| 1st | 2017 SCL FINALS - Mexico |
| 1st | 2018 SCL Abu Dhabi |
| 1st | 2018 SCL Finland |
| 1st | 2018 SCL Serbia |
World's Strongest Team
| 1st | 2015 World's Strongest Team with Hafþór Júlíus Björnsson |
| 3rd | 2019 World's Strongest Team with Mikhail Shilyakov |
Slovenia's Strongest Man
| 1st | 2014 Slovenia's Strongest Man |
| 1st | 2015 Slovenia's Strongest Man |
| 1st | 2018 Slovenia's Strongest Man |
| 1st | 2019 Slovenia's Strongest Man |
| 1st | 2022 Slovenia's Strongest Man |
| 1st | 2023 Slovenia’s Strongest Man |
| 1st | 2024 Slovenia’s Strongest Man |
Austria's Strongest Man
| 1st | 2019 Austria's Strongest Man |

Matjaz Belsak (in Slovenian Matjaž Belšak; born 23 September 1992) is a Slovenian professional strongman and powerlifter. Having competed in 80 International strongman competitions and winning 21 of them, Belsak is the eighth most decorated strongman in history.

== Biography ==
=== Early life ===
Matjaž Belšak was born in a village Seničica, near Ljubljana, the capital of Slovenia on 23 September 1992. He grew up in a family of cooks; his parents own a restaurant "Gostilna Belšak" where he still occasionally works as an apprentice chef. He graduated in Tourist Studies.

=== Powerlifting career ===
Matjaž started working out in 2008, when he was 15, with a goal to become stronger. As his strength was increasing really fast, it soon became clear that he might be able to show some really decent results in a couple of years. He decided to compete in his first powerlifting meet in 2010, when he was 17 years old. During his early years of strength related sports he set quite a few Slovenian national records in powerlifting and he even won the overall gold in GPC Slovenian Powerlifting nationals in 2010. In 2012 he won his first and only international powerlifting meet (GPC), totaling 875 kg / 1929 lbs (360 kg / 793,5 lbs in the squat, 190 kg / 419 lbs in bench press and 325 kg / 716,5 in deadlift). After that competition he only focused on the sport of strongman.

=== Strongman career ===
==== Beginnings ====
A former Slovenian strongman and Slovenia's strongest man at that time Gregor Stegnar saw the potential in the young powerlifter and inspired him to try strongman for the first time in 2012, offering him his mentorship. Matjaž quickly fell in love with the sport. He started competing in competitions in Slovenia and surrounding countries.

==== Becoming a professional strongman ====
Matjaž became a professional strongman after winning the Savickas classic competition in 2015, which enabled him to compete in the Strongman Champions League in the next season at just 20 years old, where he was among the youngest competing athletes.

==== Slovenia's Strongest Man ====
Almost immediately after starting to compete in strongman, Matjaž won the title of Slovenia's Strongest Man in 2014 and did it again in 2015 The contest was not held during the next two years. In 2018 and 2019 he again won the title back to back. The contest was again not held during the next two years due to COVID-19.

From 2022 onwards, besides competing, Matjaž also took over the organizing and hosting of the competition. He won the title in 2022, 2023 and 2024, taking his tally to 7 titles.

==== Strongman Champions League ====
- During the 2013–2016 seasons, Matjaž did only a few competitions during his first two years of competing in the Strongman Champions League, as he was mostly focusing on becoming stronger, but he competed in a lot of SCL events in 2016 and finished the season by taking the 5th place in the finals.
- In the season of 2017, Matjaž won all of the SCL competitions he took part in and even won the final in Mexico, becoming the 2017 Strongman Champion's League world champion, achieving one of his biggest goals to that day, as he stated in a video made a year before.

==== World's Strongest Man ====
After a few successful years of competing on the international level, Matjaž was invited to compete in the World's Strongest Man.

- In the 2015 World's Strongest Man in Putrajaya, Malaysia, Matjaž successfully made his first appearance at the event. While he didn't qualify for the finals, he finished 3rd in his heat.
- In the 2016 World's Strongest Man in Kasane, Botswana, Matjaž made it to the finals, finishing 9th overall.
- In the 2017 World's Strongest Man in Gabarone, Botswana, he was unable to make it to the finals, finishing 3rd in his heat.
- In the 2018 World's Strongest Man in Manila, Philippines, Matjaž had his best performance at WSM, finishing 7th place overall in the finals.

==== World's Strongest Team ====
- Matjaž competed for the first time in this event in 2015 World's Strongest Team, taking the 1st place with Hafþór Júlíus Björnsson who competed under the name 'Vikings'. Yankees (Jerry Pritchett & Mike Burke) placed second while the Saxons (Eddie Hall & Mark Felix) placed third.
- He also competed in 2019 World's Strongest Team, finishing on 3rd place with Mikhail Shivlyakov.

==== Europe's Strongest Man ====
Matjaž competed on three different Europe's Strongest Man competitions, always finishing in the top 10:

- In 2015 Europe's Strongest Man he made his first appearance, finishing the competition on 5th place.
- In 2017 Europe's Strongest Man he placed 6th.
- In 2018 Europe's Strongest Man Matjaž finished on the 7th place.

==== Arnold Strongman Classic ====
Matjaž competed on Arnold Strongman Classic events all over the world. His most important placings were:

- 6th place at 2018 Arnold Strongman Classic USA in Columbus, OH.
- 5th place at 2019 Arnold Strongman Classic USA in Columbus, OH.
- 1st place at 2017 Arnold Strongman Classic Europe in Barcelona, Spain.
- 2nd place at 2018 Arnold Strongman Classic Europe in Barcelona, Spain.
- 1st place at 2017 Arnold Strongman Classic Poland.

=== Hip replacement and rehabilitation ===
Matjaž had a complete right hip replacement on 24 June 2021 because of an old injury. The injury made him unable to compete for some time. His first strongman competition after the hip replacement was Slovenia's Strongest man 2022, which he also won, just about a year after the surgery. During the rehabilitation he also competed at Slovenia's Arm Wrestling Championship 2022.

== Physical characteristics ==
Matjaž is 187 cm tall (6 ft 2 in) and weighs around 150 kg (330 lbs) during the competitive strongman season.

== Daily life ==
Matjaž trains most of the time in his home gym. He usually trains for 3–4 hours a day, besides his regular stretching and mobility routines. He usually has 5 meals per day and consumes between 5000 and 7000 calories daily. He tries to sleep for at least 8 hours every night.

== Personal records ==
- Deadlift – 410 kg (904 lb) (2019 Arnold Africa) (National Record)
- Elephant bar Deadlift (Raw w/straps) – 404 kg (891 lb) (2019 Arnold Strongman Classic)
- Frame Deadlift (from 15 in) – 450 kg (992 lb) (2019 Slovenia's Strongest Man)
- Car Deadlift – 340 kg (750 lb) x 16 reps (2014 SCL Hungary)
- Squat – 400 kg (882 lb) (Raw, with wraps)
- Axle press – 200 kg (441 lb) (2017 Europe's Strongest Man)
- Log press – 200 kg (441 lb) (2014 Owerhead King Austri) (National Record)
- Log press (with SCL giant log) – 195 kg (430 lb) (2017 SCL FIBO)
- Viking press – 160 kg (353 lb) x 15 reps (2016 SCL Norway)
- Block press – 140 kg (309 lb) (2014 Savickas Classic)
- Cyr Dumbbell press – 127 kg (280 lb) (2020 Arnold Strongman Classic)
- Cyr (Junior) Dumbbell press for reps (in 60 seconds) – 102 kg (225 lb) x 9 reps (has achieved this feat twice)
  (2017 SCL Canada) and (2017 Festival des Hommes Forts de Warwick) (Joint-World Record)
- Circus Dumbbell press for reps (in 60 seconds) – 100 kg (220 lb) x 10 reps (2016 WSM - Group 1) (Former Joint-World Record)
- Circus Dumbbell press for reps (in 60 seconds) – 92 kg (203 lb) x 14 reps (2017 SCL World Finals) (World Record)
- Atlas Stones – 5 stones set 140–180 kg (309–397 lb) in 19.89 seconds (2015 SCL FIBO) (World Record)
- Atlas Stone to Shoulder – 140 kg (309 lb) x 8 reps/ bouncing technique (2014 Giants Live Hungary) (Former World Record)
- Max Atlas Stone – 220 kg (485 lb) (2019 Arnold Africa)
- Húsafell Stone – 186 kg (410 lb) for 55.07 meters (180 ft 8 in) (2019 Arnold Strongman Classic)
- Odd Haugen tombstone to shoulder – 186 kg (410 lb) (2019 Arnold Strongman Classic)
- Sandbag over bar – 32 kg (71 lb) over 4.57 metres (15 ft 0 in) (2018 Arnold Strongman Classic)
- Front hold – 40 kg (88 lb) for 15.94 seconds (2015 SCL Poland)
- Power Medley – 100 kg (220 lb) log carry for 20m course and 300 kg (661 lb) sled drag for 20m course in 34.50 seconds (2017 SCL World Finals) (World Record)
- Conan's Wheel of Pain – 9,072 kg (20,000 lb) 32.16 meters (105 ft 6 in) (2019 Arnold Strongman Classic)
- Arm over arm truck pull – 10,000 kg (22,046 lb) for 25m course in 43.67 seconds (2015 SCL Martinique) (World Record)
- Arm over arm truck pull – 18,000 kg (39,683 lb) for 20m course in 37.28 seconds (2015 SCL Austria) (World Record)
- Viking Boat pull (without the sails) – 3,000 kg (6,614 lb) harness only/ no rope for 25 meters 'in ice terrain' - 16.68 seconds (2016 World's Strongest Viking / SCL Norway) (Former World Record)
- Truck pull – 31,752 kg (70,001 lb) 'uphill' for 16.12 meters (2017 Festival des Hommes Forts de Warwick)

== Media appearances ==
Despite being one of the strongest people on earth, Matjaž does not get that much media attention in Slovenia. However, he made a few appearances in Slovenian's most important media:

- In 2016 he gave an interview on a popular Slovenian radio show, hosted by Denis Avdić, where he was asked to pull a truck.
- In 2018 he gave an interview for the Slovenian national television.
- In 2019 Matjaž was a special guest on an annual event of Elektro Ljubljana, one of major energy suppliers in Slovenia, where he symbolically lifted a model of a transmission tower.
- In 2020 he gave an interview during one of the most watched Slovenian news shows on Pop TV.
