= 2016 World's Strongest Man =

Strongman competition in 2016

Competition information
- Dates: 13–20 August 2016
- Venue: Seboba Cultural Village and Park / Kasane Airport / Hot Springs
- Location: Kasane
- Country: Botswana
- Athletes participating: 30
- Nations participating: 14

Champion(s)
- (United States) Brian Shaw

The 2016 World's Strongest Man was the 39th edition of the World's Strongest Man competition. The event was held in Kasane, Botswana, from August 13 to 20. Brian Shaw won his 4th World's Strongest Man title, putting him in an elite group of only three other men; Jón Páll Sigmarsson, Magnús Ver Magnússon, and Žydrūnas Savickas. Only Mariusz Pudzianowski holds more titles, with a total of five.

Various world records were broken in the course of the qualifying heats and the grand final, including the Keg Toss at 7 meters 25 centimetres. Eddie Hall broke another deadlift world record.

== Participants ==
- Martins Licis (United States)
- Matjaz Belsak (Slovenia)
- Luke Stoltman (United Kingdom)
- Mark Felix (United Kingdom)
- Johannes Arsjo (Sweden)
- Robert Oberst (United States)
- Eddie Hall (United Kingdom)
- Grzegorz Szymański (Poland)
- Adam Bishop (United Kingdom)
- Nick Best (United States)
- Jon Olav Granli (Norway)
- Jon Lane (United States)
- Hafþór Júlíus Björnsson (Iceland)
- Konstantine Janashia (Georgia (country))
- Terry Hollands (United Kingdom)
- Johnny Hansson (Sweden)
- Derek Devaughan (United States)
- Colm Woulfe (New Zealand)
- Jean-François Caron (Canada)
- Laurence Shahlaei (United Kingdom)
- Ari Gunnarsson (Iceland)
- Bryan Benzel (United States)
- Mikkel Leicht (Denmark)
- Stan Carradine (United States)
- Brian Shaw (United States)
- Mateusz Kieliszkowski (Poland)
- Johan Els (South Africa)
- Gerhard Van Staden (South Africa)
- Charlie Gough (United Kingdom)
- Eben Le Roux (Australia)

== Heat Results ==
The heats were held in various parts of Kasane, Botswana, such as the golf course and hot springs. Each heat allowed for a maximum of 42 points to be scored by competitors. The scoring worked the same as in the prior year but not previous years; in the final event in the heats, the Atlas Stones were awarded double points. The top two from each heat qualified for the grand final. There were six events in each heat chosen out of the following: Loading Race, Hercules Hold, Truck Pull, Squat Lift, Dumbbell Press, Atlas Stones, Viking Press, and Keg Toss.

=== Heat 1 ===
#	Name	Nationality	Pts
1	Martins Licis	United States	38
2	Matjaz Belsak	Slovenia	30
3	Luke Stoltman	United Kingdom	22
4	Mark Felix	United Kingdom	22
5	Johannes Arsjo	Sweden	15 (Inj)
6	Robert Oberst	United States	7 (Inj)

Heat 1 featured three former finalists (Arsjo, Felix and Oberst) and three young hopefuls (Belsak, Licis and Stoltman), with the latter two being rookies.

The big stage didn't intimidate Martins Licis, the American running out to a lead in the Loading Race, getting three barrels in 41.01 seconds. Belsak was second, with Arsjo third, while Oberst tore a bicep. The big OB stepped up in the Hercules Hold, holding on to the pillars for 42.91 seconds. Mark Felix, last in the first event, shattered that mark and got the win by 15 seconds, to the great joy of the local crowd. Oberst had to retire because of his injury. One of the favorites in the heat, Johannes Arsjo, finally delivered in the Fingal Fingers, being the only man to get all five flipped. Licis got good points again with second place, and he led the heat after three events with 15 points. Arsjo and Belsak were tied for second place with 11.

The Squat Lift was next, and Johannes Arsjo was determined to set a good score. However, his quadriceps gave way after three reps, which forced him to pull out of the contest. Belsak then got to five, but Licis squatted his way to seven reps and the win, celebrating with the weight still on his back. Only four men took part in the Dumbbell Press, and Belsak attacked that one. The Slovenian powerhouse managed 10 repetitions, while Licis got six. Belsak's mark set a World's Strongest Man record with a 100 kg dumbbell. The Atlas Stones did not matter much, but Licis put on a show for the fans by getting all five stones up. The American rookie won the heat overall, with Belsak taking second. Both men advanced to their first career final.

=== Heat 2 ===
#	Name	Nationality	Pts
1	Eddie Hall	United Kingdom	36.5
2	Grzegorz Szymański	Poland	31.5
3	Adam Bishop	United Kingdom	30
4	Nick Best	United States	24
5	Jon Olav Granli	Norway	13.5
6	Jon Lane	United States	10.5

Heat 2 featured a favorite for the title, Eddie Hall, as well as 2010 finalist Nick Best. Grzegorz Szymanski and Adam Bishop tried to make their first final, while Jon Olav Granli and Jon Lane were rookies. Lane, originally a reserve, had stepped up to replace Frank Okalome of Nigeria.

The heat started with a disaster for Eddie Hall, who dislocated two fingers while training for the Barrel Loading Race. The organizers decided to make the men of Heat 2 load sacks instead, but it didn't help the Englishman that much. He could only get 4th place, while Szymanski edged out Bishop by 0.15 seconds for the win. The Truck Pull saw another close result, with Hall beating Szymanski by less than a second. Nick Best grabbed another third place in that event. The Keg Toss for height followed, and Hall struggled early, settling with a tie with Best. Both men got 6 meters. Bishop and Szymanski, meanwhile, matched each other throw for throw and opted to tie after both clearing 7 meters. Szymanski's consistency gave him the lead halfway in, with 16.5 points. Bishop and Hall were tied with 12.5, while Best wasn't far back with 11.5 points.

Next up was the Deadlift for reps. Nick Best, finally putting his back problems to rest, managed a solid 12 reps while Szymanski got nine. Jon Lane powered up and pulled an impressive six reps. The two Brits then went against each other, and Eddie Hall knew what he had to do. He stayed one rep ahead of his compatriot, edging out Bishop 13 reps to 12. In the Viking Press, Jon Olav Granli finally broke through by getting six reps. He beat Szymanski (five), Bishop (three), Best (two), and Lane (none). However, that was no match for Eddie Hall's shoulder power, The Beast getting the weight overhead nine times.

These results meant that after five events, Hall was ahead of Szymanski by one point. Bishop was 3.5 points back of the Pole, with Best 5.5 points behind him. Bishop thus needed to beat Szymanski by two places in the Atlas Stones (worth double points), while Best needed to beat the Pole by three spots. This plan did not materialize for the man from Nevada, as Bishop got four stones up in 29.85 seconds. Unfortunately, number five fell just short for him. Eddie Hall destroyed the first four stones, getting the event win, while Szymanski paced himself for number four. The Polish contender stopped the clock at 33.78 for four, keeping him ahead of Bishop. This was the third final for Hall and a first for Szymanski.

=== Heat 3 ===
#	Name	Nationality	Pts
1	Hafþór Júlíus Björnsson	Iceland	40
2	Konstantine Janashia	Georgia	29
3	Terry Hollands	United Kingdom	27
4	Johnny Hansson	Sweden	20
5	Derek Devaughan	United States	17.5
6	Colm Woulfe	New Zealand	12.5

Heat 3 featured four rookie competitors, along with two veterans. These two, Hafthor Bjornsson of Iceland and Terry Hollands of Great Britain, had combined for 14 final appearances and six podiums before arriving in Botswana. They were thus the favorites to make it out of the heat. An interesting fact is that all of the athletes in the group were 196 cm (6 ft 5 in) or more in height, the shortest man being Colm Woulfe.

The first event, the Loading Race, saw Bjornsson win easily, finishing 26 seconds faster than his closest rival, Derek DeVaughan. The American beat Johnny Hansson of Sweden by 5 seconds, while Terry Hollands, battling an illness, finished in 4th place. In the next event, Fingal's Fingers, Hansson scored well again, finishing all five cylinders in 50.52 seconds. This performance put pressure on Bjornsson, but the Mountain delivered, completing the course in 44.15 seconds for the win. Konstantine Janashia was fastest on four fingers for 3rd place, with Hollands 4th again. The third discipline was the Keg Toss for max height. Derek DeVaughan failed early, while Colm Woulfe's strong 6.5 meters only gave him 5th spot. Hollands just cleared 6.75 meters to tie for the second spot with rookies Janashia and Hansson, but Thor was yet again unstoppable. His throw on the 7m bar cleared by a mile, and he went for his own world record, which he broke by setting a mark of 7.15 meters. After three events, Bjornsson had a perfect score of 18 points, with Johnny Hansson second with 13. Terry Hollands, surprisingly, was down in a tie for third with Konstantine Janashia, both men having 10 points.

Event 4 was the Car Deadlift, and this is where it all unraveled for Johnny Hansson, the Swede only getting two reps. The Mountain stopped at six, knowing it would be enough for good points, but the real story was the duel between Janashia and Hollands. The Georgian Bull cranked out the early lifts fast, and stayed one rep ahead of the Englishman all the way to get the event win, 10 reps to 9. All of a sudden, Janashia was now in a position to make the final. He had 16 points, while Hollands had 15 and Hansson 14. The Dumbbell Press was the penultimate event. In this one, Colm Woulfe and Derek DeVaughan tied on four reps in the first pairing. Next up were Janashia and Hollands, with the latter needing a big result to put pressure on the rookie from Georgia. However, the opposite materialized: Hollands struggled and finished with three lifts, while Janashia was solid and managed five reps to take the lead. The last two men were the Scandinavians. Hansson, perhaps affected by the heat of Botswana, did not get a lift, but Bjornsson was solid as always and got the six repetitions he needed for the win. Therefore, heading into the final event, Bjornsson had 28 points, Janashia sat in second with 21 and Hollands had 17.

The Atlas Stones, worth double points, again determined who made it to the final. While all Hafthor Bjornsson needed to qualify was to put one stone up, Terry Hollands had to beat Konstantine Janashia and hope that someone snuck in between him and the Georgian. Derek DeVaughan and Colm Woulfe each got three stones up, which took us to Hollands and Janashia. The two of them stayed neck-and-neck through the first four stones, the Brit getting it 24.84 seconds against 25.36 for the Georgian. The latter was first to commit on number five, but dropped the ball after almost getting it up. Hollands also came close but failed on stone five, meaning he would need someone to lift four stones in between 24.84 and 25.36 seconds. The odds of that happening were very slim, and it did not happen. Bjornsson completed five in 24.15 seconds, while Hansson got four stones in just under 38 seconds. This meant that Bjornsson, of course, qualified, while Konstantine Janashia created one of the biggest upsets in World's Strongest Man history by beating Terry Hollands, a nine-time finalist, in the heats.

=== Heat 4 ===
#	Name	Nationality	Pts
1	Jean-François Caron	Canada	36.5
2	Laurence Shahlaei	United Kingdom	31.5
3	Ari Gunnarsson	Iceland	24
4	Bryan Benzel	United States	20
5	Mikkel Leicht	Denmark	20
6	Stan Carradine	United States	14

Heat 4 had two clear favorites to make the final. Laurence Shahlaei, freshly crowned Europe's Strongest Man, was one of them, and so was Jean-François Caron of Canada, a three-time finalist. Four rookies made up the rest of the heat; Mikhail Shivlyakov, a 2015 finalist, was supposed to be there but pulled out and was replaced by Stan Carradine.

In the Loading Race, Shahlaei struggled and finished all the way down in 5th, while Caron was the only man to complete the event. Ari Gunnarsson of Iceland took second place. The Hercules Hold, a classic test of grip strength, saw Carradine set the early pace by posting a time of 41.68 seconds. Shahlaei then beat the American by a second, but Caron had the advantage of going last. The French Canadian knew what he had to beat, and did just that, holding on for 44 seconds and the win. The Truck Pull was up next, and Shahlaei finally showed what he was capable of, setting a time of 41.66, while Caron could only produce a 43.60. After three events, it was JF Caron on top with 17 points, Shahlaei second with 13, with Bryan Benzel in third with 10.

It was then on to the Squat Lift, and neither of the first four men to go made an impression as Ari Gunnarsson took the lead with three reps. Caron and Shahlaei decided to settle for the tie and 5.5 points each, both of them getting four easy reps before stopping. Event 5, the Dumbbell Press, was a real struggle for the Englishman in the group, as he could only manage two reps. That gave him last place, while Mikkel Leicht battled through his quadriceps injury to win the event with 8 reps. Gunnarsson was second, with 6. This meant that the Icelander was right back in the hunt, and the battle for second place in the heat would come down to the Atlas Stones. However, Gunnarsson's inexperience cost him in that event and he could only get three stones up, while Shahlaei lifted four in a fast time to win the event ahead of Caron. The two veterans, therefore, made it into the final yet again.

=== Heat 5 ===
#	Name	Nationality	Pts
1	Brian Shaw	United States	39.5
2	Mateusz Kieliszkowski	Poland	33.5
3	Johan Els	South Africa	24.5
4	Gerhard Van Staden	South Africa	23.5
5	Charlie Gough	United Kingdom	18
6	Eben Le Roux	Australia	4 (Inj)

Heat 5 featured the defending World's Strongest Man, Brian Shaw, squaring up against five men who had never made the final. Eben Le Roux and Gerhard Van Staden were veterans of the competition, while Mateusz Kieliszkowski, Charlie Gough and Johan Els were rookies. Els appeared as a replacement for Benedikt Magnusson of Iceland, who had suffered an infection from an insect bite.

Up first was the Loading Race, where Johan Els raced out to a lead, surprising many by running with all four sacks and posting a time of 47.27 seconds. The next heat, however, saw Mateusz Kieliszkowski of Poland sprinting away and finishing at 37.02, while Shaw was 3rd in 48.06. Els performed well again in the Bus Pull, finishing just behind his compatriot Van Staden, but Shaw set a time of 41 seconds to send a message to the rest of the heat. Kieliszkowski was not too impressed by that time, as he stopped the clock at 42.16 despite a stumble. In the Keg Toss for height, Kieliszkowski tied with the South Africans on 6.75 meters, while Shaw cleared the bar easily at 7 meters. The American then went for Bjornsson's record of 7.15, set in Heat 3, and shattered it by throwing his keg over the 7.25-meter bar. After 3 events, Shaw led with 16 points, Kieliszkowski was one point back in second place, and Els was in third with 12 points, a point ahead of his compatriot Van Staden.

The Car Deadlift was a struggle for Els, who only got two reps. Kieliszkowski, suffering from back problems, managed five, while Van Staden and Gough tied with seven reps. Brian Shaw got 10 very easy lifts in less than 30 seconds, before stopping to save energy. In the Viking Press, Els struggled again while Van Staden set a solid mark of six repetitions to beat. The two leaders did not let that affect them, Kieliszkowski and Shaw blasting their way to nine reps each to tie for the win. In the Atlas Stones, the South Africans failed to get the fourth stone up, which meant that the leaders had no pressure. Shaw lifted four fast, while Kieliszkowski was a bit slower, but both men moved on to the final in strong fashion.

== Finals events results ==
The final was held at the Cultural Village in Botswana, with the following events.

The final featured five first-time finalists, including three World's Strongest Man rookies, a number not seen since the days of the IFSA split in the mid-2000s. Two Americans, two Brits, two Poles, an Icelander, a Canadian, a Slovenian and a Georgian made up the field. Poland had not had a finalist in four years, while it was a first representation of Slovenia and Georgia in the World's Strongest Man final.

=== Event 1: Frame Carry ===
- Weight: 375 kilograms (827 lb)
- Course Length: 30 metres (98 ft)

#	Athlete	Nation	Time	Event Points	Overall Points
1	Mateusz Kieliszkowski	Poland	0m 17.69	10	10
2	Konstantine Janashia	Georgia	0m 22.82	9	9
3	Brian Shaw	United States	0m 28.25	8	8
4	Martins Licis	United States	0m 41.29	7	7
5	Hafþór Júlíus Björnsson	Iceland	0m 51.29	6	6
6	Grzegorz Szymanski	Poland	0m 52.93	5	5
7	Laurence Shahlaei (Note: Shahlaei sustained an injury in this event and took no further part in the competition.)	United Kingdom	24.30 metres (79.7 ft)	4	4
8	JF Caron	Canada	21.10 metres (69.2 ft)	3	3
9	Matjaz Belsak	Slovenia	1.30 metres (4 ft 3 in)	2	2
10	Eddie Hall	United Kingdom	0.20 metres (7.9 in)	1	1

In the first event, the Frame Carry, Laurence Shahlaei sprinted out to an early lead but sustained a left calf injury during the event. He was unable to complete the course, and had to withdraw from the competition. That gave Mateusz Kieliszkowski a clear path to the win, with the young Pole setting an incredible time of 17.69 seconds and the event win. Konstantine Janashia, another rookie in the final, was five seconds slower in second, while Brian Shaw grabbed 8 points for third. Hafthor Bjornsson's grip failed him, and he finished in 5th place. Another favorite for the title, Eddie Hall, was battling two dislocated fingers and could not hold the weight. He had to settle for last place.

=== Event 2: Circus Barbell Press ===
- Weight: 163.5 kilograms (360 lb) for as many repetitions as possible.
- Time Limit: 75 seconds

#	Athlete	Nation	Repetitions	Event Points	Overall Points
1	Hafþór Júlíus Björnsson	Iceland	8	9.5	15.5
1	Eddie Hall	United Kingdom	8	9.5	10.5
3	Brian Shaw	United States	7	7.5	15.5
3	Konstantine Janashia	Georgia	7	7.5	16.5
5	Martins Licis	United States	6	6	13
6	Mateusz Kieliszkowski	Poland	5	5	15
7	JF Caron	Canada	4	3.5	6.5
7	Matjaz Belsak	Slovenia	4	3.5	5.5
9	Grzegorz Szymanski	Poland	2	2	7

The second event was a test of overhead pressing power. The nine athletes had to press a 163 kg circus barbell for reps in 75 seconds. Janashia and Licis stole the show early, with the Georgian Bull getting seven reps to Licis' six. The next pairing featured Kieliszkowski and Shaw. The Polish rookie struggled with the wobbly bar and got five reps, while Shaw was only able to tie Janashia's mark of seven. That proved crucial, as Bjornsson and Hall attacked the bar and both got eight repetitions, thus tying for the win. This meant that the man from Georgia led after two events with 16.5 points, while Shaw and Bjornsson were tied for second with 15.5. Kieliszkowski was in 4th with 15 points.

=== Event 3: Max Deadlift ===
- Starting Weight: 375 kilograms (827 lb)

#	Athlete	Nation	Weight Lifted	Event Points	Overall Points
1	Brian Shaw	United States	445 kilograms (981 lb)	9.5	25
1	Eddie Hall	United Kingdom	445 kilograms (981 lb)	9.5	20
3	JF Caron	Canada	435 kilograms (959 lb)	8	14.5
4	Hafþór Júlíus Björnsson	Iceland	420 kilograms (930 lb)	6.5	22
4	Konstantine Janashia	Georgia	420 kilograms (930 lb)	6.5	23
6	Martins Licis	United States	400 kilograms (880 lb)	4.5	17.5
6	Matjaz Belsak	Slovenia	400 kilograms (880 lb)	4.5	10
8	Mateusz Kieliszkowski	Poland	375 kilograms (827 lb)	2.5	17.5
8	Grzegorz Szymanski	Poland	375 kilograms (827 lb)	2.5	9.5

The final event on day one was the Max Deadlift. All remaining athletes cleared the opening weight of 375 kg, but both Poles failed to get 400 kg. Licis and Matjaz Belsak had to settle for 400 kg, while five men locked out successfully on 420 kg. The next weight, 435 kg, was cleared by Jean-François Caron for a new Canadian record. Shaw and Hall also cleared this weight, while Janashia and Bjornsson were not able to get the lift. 445 kg followed, and Caron failed it despite getting it to his knees. Hall and Shaw were successful again, and they settled for the tie to save energy for day two. At the halfway point, it was defending champion Brian Shaw leading with 25 points, two ahead of Janashia and three ahead of Bjornsson. Eddie Hall now found himself back in the hunt, with 20 points in 4th place.

=== Event 4: Plane Pull ===
- Weight: 40,000 kilograms (88,000 lb)
- Course Length: 25 metres (82 ft)
- Time Limit: 60 seconds
- No athlete completed the full course.

#	Athlete	Nation	Distance	Event Points	Overall Points
1	Hafþór Júlíus Björnsson	Iceland	24.90 metres (81.7 ft)	10	32
2	Brian Shaw	United States	24.53 metres (80.5 ft)	9	34
3	Eddie Hall	United Kingdom	24.45 metres (80.2 ft)	8	28
4	Konstantine Janashia	Georgia	24.06 metres (78.9 ft)	7	30
5	Matjaz Belsak	Slovenia	23.55 metres (77.3 ft)	6	16
6	Grzegorz Szymanski	Poland	23.35 metres (76.6 ft)	5	14.5
7	Martins Licis	United States	22.53 metres (73.9 ft)	4	21.5
8	Mateusz Kieliszkowski	Poland	22.14 metres (72.6 ft)	3	20.5
9	JF Caron	Canada	21.73 metres (71.3 ft)	2	16.5

Day two started with the brutal Plane Pull. This was supposed to be a timed event to see who could finish the 25-meter course fastest, but it became apparent that distance would be key after the first five athletes failed to get to the finish, Belsak leading with 23.55 meters. Eddie Hall then went, and his huge body weight helped him get to a distance of 24.45 meters. Konstantine Janashia didn't quite manage that, but he did edge out Belsak. Hafthor Bjornsson, having lost the pulling events in 2014 and 2015, drove very hard and fought for every inch, taking the lead with a distance of 24.90 meters. Brian Shaw, going last, had a good pace but stumbled with a few meters to go, and couldn't find his rhythm again. His distance of 24.53 meters gave him second place. The win gave Bjornsson a fighting chance, as he was now trailing Shaw by only two points. Janashia was two points behind the Viking, with Hall two points behind Janashia for third. The scores were 34 for Shaw, 32 for Thor, 30 for the Georgian Bull, and 28 for Hall.

=== Event 5: Kettle bell throw ===
- Weight: 7 Kettle bell series ranging from 20–30 kilograms (44–66 lb)
- Bar Height: 4.8 metres (16 ft)
- Time Limit: 60 seconds

#	Athlete	Nation	Time	Event Points	Overall Points
1	Brian Shaw	United States	6 in 0m 34.97	10	44
2	Hafþór Júlíus Björnsson	Iceland	6 in 0m 40.22	9	41
3	JF Caron	Canada	5 in 0m 31.88	8	24.5
4	Eddie Hall	United Kingdom	5 in 0m 56.92	7	35
5	Konstantine Janashia	Georgia	5 in 0m 59.5	6	36
6	Grzegorz Szymanski	Poland	4 in 0m 22.78	5	19.5
7	Mateusz Kieliszkowski	Poland	4 in 0m 34.28	4	24.5
8	Matjaz Belsak	Slovenia	3 in 0m 49.61	3	19
9	Martins Licis	United States	0	0	21.5

The penultimate event was the Kettlebell Throw, a tough explosive event where athletes were timed for each kettlebell they got over a 15'7 bar. JF Caron got things going by getting 5 over in 31.88 seconds. Martins Licis really struggled and did not get a good throw, giving him no points in that event. It was Eddie Hall next, and the Englishman took his time to make sure each throw counted. Despite making a few mistakes along the way, The Beast managed 5 in 56.92 seconds. Konstantine Janashia was quick on the first few, but just cleared the fourth and then got the crowd going for number five. The time spent doing so proved costly for the Georgian, who was a few seconds slower than Hall for five bells. Hafthor Bjornsson won the throwing event in the 2014 final, and was a favorite heading into this one. The first five cleared in just under 17 seconds for the Icelander, but his need for speed cost him dearly on the sixth. Thor didn't get the right launch angle and missed, which broke his rhythm. He had to take two more attempts to get it and then lacked the necessary energy for the seventh. His score was of 6 in 40.22. Brian Shaw then knew what he had to beat, and was much more sensible in his throws. The man from Colorado paced himself well, clearing the sixth in 34.97 seconds, before trying the seventh for the roaring crowd but not quite getting it. Still, this meant Shaw now had a three-point lead heading into the stones, while the battle for third was a one-point affair between Janashia and Hall.

=== Event 6: Atlas Stones ===
- Weight: 5 Atlas Stone series ranging from 150–210 kilograms (330–460 lb)
- Time Limit: 60 seconds

#	Athlete	Nation	Time	Event Points	Overall Points
1	Hafþór Júlíus Björnsson	Iceland	5 in 0m 26.60	10	51
2	Brian Shaw	United States	5 in 0m 28.02	9	53
3	Eddie Hall	United Kingdom	5 in 0m 29.68	8	43
4	Martins Licis	United States	5 in 0m 34.80	7	28.5
5	Grzegorz Szymanski	Poland	4 in 0m 24.19	6	25.5
6	JF Caron	Canada	4 in 0m 29.79	5	29.5
7	Konstantine Janashia	Georgia	4 in 0m 29.92	4	40
8	Mateusz Kieliszkowski	Poland	4 in 0m 32.38	3	27.5
9	Matjaz Belsak	Slovenia	4 in 0m 37.12	2	21

The Atlas Stones, as always, put an end to the contest. Another impressive performance by American rookie Martins Licis gave him the lead, as he got five stones in a time of 34.80. Konstantine Janashia and Eddie Hall were in a battle for a podium, the winner of their duel guaranteeing the third spot in the 2016 World's Strongest Man competition. Hall got the edge on the first few stones, one-motioning the first three. He never looked back and stopped the clock at 29.68, while Janashia stopped at four stones. The Georgian's performance was still the best by a rookie in the final since Misha Koklyaev's third place in 2010. The duel for the title was next, but The Mountain had a tall one to climb: He had to win the event and hope for Shaw to finish in over 34.80 seconds. Bjornsson did his job, finishing in 26.60 to get another event win, but Shaw got five in 28.02 seconds to secure a fourth title.

Brian Shaw's title tied him with Zydrunas Savickas, Magnus Ver Magnusson and Jon Pall Sigmarsson for second in all-time victories, while Hafthor Bjornsson had to make do with a fifth career podium. Eddie Hall's third spot gave him a first-ever podium finish, and the first podium finish for a British competitor since Terry Hollands in 2011.

== Final standings ==
#	Athlete	Nation	Points
1st place, gold medalist(s)	Brian Shaw	United States	53
2nd place, silver medalist(s)	Hafþór Júlíus Björnsson	Iceland	51
3rd place, bronze medalist(s)	Eddie Hall	United Kingdom	43
4	Konstantine Janashia	Georgia	40
5	Jean-François Caron	Canada	29.5
6	Martins Licis	United States	28.5
7	Mateusz Kieliszkowski	Poland	27.5
8	Grzegorz Szymański	Poland	25.5
9	Matjaz Belsak	Slovenia	21
10	Laurence Shahlaei	United Kingdom	4 (injury)

Preceded by 2015 World's Strongest Man	2016 World's Strongest Man	Succeeded by 2017 World's Strongest Man
