= Europe's Strongest Man =

Annual European strength athletics competition

Tournament information
- Location: Leeds, England
- Established: 1980
- Format: Multi-event competition

Current champion
- (Czech Republic) Ondřej Fojtů

Most recent tournament
- 2026 Europe's Strongest Man

Europe's Strongest Man is an annual strength athletics competition which began in 1980. The event is held in various locations throughout Europe, and features exclusively European strongman competitors. Mariusz Pudzianowski holds the record for most wins with six titles. Hafþór Júlíus Björnsson holds five titles, while Geoff Capes, Riku Kiri and Žydrūnas Savickas share three titles each.

As of 2010, the Europe's Strongest Man contest has become a part of the Giants Live season of annual grand prix events. The contest serves as a qualifying event for the World's Strongest Man contest, with the top 3 placings qualifying for that year's WSM contest.

== Championship breakdown ==
Year	Champion	Runner-up	3rd Place	Location
1980	(United Kingdom) Geoff Capes	(United Kingdom) Richard Slaney	(Austria) Vincenz Hortnagl	London, United Kingdom
1981	(Sweden) Lars Hedlund	(United Kingdom) Geoff Capes	(To be confirmed)	Sweden
1982	(United Kingdom) Geoff Capes	(Netherlands) Simon Wulfse	(Sweden) Roger Ekstrom	Amsterdam, Netherlands
1983	(Netherlands) Simon Wulfse	(United Kingdom) Geoff Capes	(Iceland) Jón Páll Sigmarsson	Arnhem, Netherlands
1984	(United Kingdom) Geoff Capes	(Netherlands) Ab Wolders	(Germany) Rudolf Kuster	Marken, Netherlands
1985	(Iceland) Jón Páll Sigmarsson	(To be confirmed)	(To be confirmed)	Iceland
1986	(Iceland) Jón Páll Sigmarsson	(To be confirmed)	(To be confirmed)	Portugal
1987	(Netherlands) Ab Wolders	(United Kingdom) Geoff Capes	(Iceland) Jón Páll Sigmarsson	Netherlands
1988	(United Kingdom) Jamie Reeves	(Iceland) Jón Páll Sigmarsson	(United Kingdom) Mark Higgins	Netherlands
1989	(United Kingdom) Jamie Reeves	(United Kingdom) Mark Higgins	(Iceland) Jón Páll Sigmarsson	Iceland
1990	(Denmark) Henning Thorsen	(Netherlands) Ted Van Der Parre	(United Kingdom) Mark Higgins	Denmark
1991	(United Kingdom) Gary Taylor & (United Kingdom) Forbes Cowan		(United Kingdom) Jamie Reeves	United Kingdom
1992	(Hungary) László Fekete	(Finland) Ilkka Nummisto	(Finland) Markku Suonenvirta	Budapest, Hungary
1992	(Netherlands) Ted van der Parre	(Iceland) Magnús Ver Magnússon & (United Kingdom) Jamie Reeves		Denmark
1993	(Austria) Manfred Hoeberl	(United Kingdom) Gary Taylor	(Iceland) Magnús Ver Magnússon	Norway
1994	(Austria) Manfred Hoeberl	(Iceland) Magnús Ver Magnússon	(United Kingdom) Gary Taylor	France
1994	(Iceland) Magnús Ver Magnússon	(To be confirmed)	(To be confirmed)	(To be confirmed)
1995	(Finland) Riku Kiri	(Finland) Jouko Ahola	(Iceland) Magnús Ver Magnússon	Heide, Germany
1996	(Finland) Riku Kiri	(Germany) Heinz Ollesch	(Iceland) Magnús Ver Magnússon	Helsinki, Finland
1997	(Finland) Riku Kiri	(Iceland) Magnús Ver Magnússon	(Netherlands) Berend Veneberg	Hardenburg, Netherlands
1998	(Finland) Jouko Ahola	(Iceland) Magnús Ver Magnússon	(Norway) Svend Karlsen	Finland
1999	(Finland) Jouko Ahola	(Faroe Islands) Regin Vagadal	(Sweden) Magnus Samuelsson	Faroe Islands
2000	(Netherlands) Berend Veneberg	(Sweden) Magnus Samuelsson	(Poland) Jarek Dymek	Sevenum, Netherlands
2001	(Norway) Svend Karlsen	(Finland) Janne Virtanen	(Sweden) Magnus Samuelsson	Helsinki, Finland
2002	(Poland) Mariusz Pudzianowski	(Poland) Jarek Dymek	(Norway) Svend Karlsen	Gdynia, Poland
2003	(Poland) Mariusz Pudzianowski	(Poland) Jarek Dymek	(Latvia) Raimonds Bergmanis	Sandomierz, Poland
2004	(Poland) Mariusz Pudzianowski	(Poland) Tomasz Nowotniak	(Lithuania) Žydrūnas Savickas	Jelenia Góra, Poland
2005	(Poland) Jarek Dymek	(Finland) Janne Virtanen	(Ukraine) Mykhailo Starov	Płock, Poland
2006	Event not held			
2007	(Poland) Mariusz Pudzianowski	(Bulgaria) Stoyan Todorchev	(Poland) Sebastian Wenta	Łódź, Poland
2008	(Poland) Mariusz Pudzianowski	(Poland) Grzegorz Szymański	(Poland) Sławomir Toczek	Szczecinek, Poland
2009	(Poland) Mariusz Pudzianowski	(Poland) Krzysztof Radzikowski	(Poland) Mateusz Baron	Bartoszyce, Poland
2010	(Lithuania) Žydrūnas Savickas	(United Kingdom) Terry Hollands	(United Kingdom) Mark Felix	London, United Kingdom
2011	Event not held			
2012	(Lithuania) Žydrūnas Savickas	(Lithuania) Vytautas Lalas	(United Kingdom) Laurence Shahlaei	Leeds, United Kingdom
2013	(Lithuania) Žydrūnas Savickas	(Lithuania) Vytautas Lalas	(Poland) Krzysztof Radzikowski	Leeds, United Kingdom
2014	(Iceland) Hafþór Júlíus Björnsson	(Sweden) Johannes Arsjo	(United Kingdom) Graham Hicks	Leeds, United Kingdom
2015	(Iceland) Hafþór Júlíus Björnsson	(Poland) Krzysztof Radzikowski	(United Kingdom) Mark Felix & (Latvia) Dainis Zageris	Leeds, United Kingdom
2016	(United Kingdom) Laurence Shahlaei	(Iceland) Hafþór Júlíus Björnsson & (Sweden) Johannes Arsjo		Leeds, United Kingdom
2017	(Iceland) Hafþór Júlíus Björnsson	(United Kingdom) Eddie Hall	(United Kingdom) Terry Hollands	Leeds, United Kingdom
2018	(Iceland) Hafþór Júlíus Björnsson	(Georgia (country)) Konstantine Janashia	(Poland) Mateusz Kieliszkowski	Leeds, United Kingdom
2019	(Iceland) Hafþór Júlíus Björnsson	(Poland) Mateusz Kieliszkowski	(Georgia (country)) Konstantine Janashia	Leeds, United Kingdom
2020	(United Kingdom) Luke Richardson	(United Kingdom) Adam Bishop	(Estonia) Ervin Toots	Harrogate, United Kingdom
2021	(United Kingdom) Luke Stoltman	(Ukraine) Oleksii Novikov	(United Kingdom) Graham Hicks	Leeds, United Kingdom
2022	(Ukraine) Oleksii Novikov	(United Kingdom) Luke Stoltman	(Georgia (country)) Konstantine Janashia	Leeds, United Kingdom
2023	(Ukraine) Pavlo Kordiyaka	(Ukraine) Oleksii Novikov	(Latvia) Aivars Šmaukstelis	Leeds, United Kingdom
2024	(United Kingdom) Luke Stoltman	(Latvia) Aivars Šmaukstelis	(Ukraine) Oleksii Novikov	Leeds, United Kingdom
2025	(United Kingdom) Luke Richardson	(United Kingdom) Paddy Haynes	(Poland) Mateusz Kieliszkowski	Leeds, United Kingdom
2026	(Czech Republic) Ondřej Fojtů	(Ukraine) Pavlo Kordiyaka	(United Kingdom) Adam Bishop	Leeds, United Kingdom

=== Most championships ===
No.	Name	Country	Times	Years
1	Mariusz Pudzianowski	Poland	6	2002, 2003, 2004, 2007, 2008, 2009
2	Hafþór Júlíus Björnsson	Iceland	5	2014, 2015, 2017, 2018, 2019
3	Geoff Capes	United Kingdom	3	1980, 1982, 1984
3	Riku Kiri	Finland	3	1995, 1996, 1997
3	Žydrūnas Savickas	Lithuania	3	2010, 2012, 2013
4	Jón Páll Sigmarsson	Iceland	2	1985, 1986
4	Jamie Reeves	United Kingdom	2	1988, 1989
4	Manfred Hoeberl	Austria	2	1993, 1994
4	Jouko Ahola	Finland	2	1998, 1999
4	Luke Stoltman	United Kingdom	2	2021, 2024
4	Luke Richardson	United Kingdom	2	2020, 2025

=== Most podium finishes ===
No.	Name	Times
1	(Iceland) Magnus Ver Magnusson	8
2	(United Kingdom) Geoff Capes	6
2	(Iceland) Hafþór Júlíus Björnsson	6
2	(Poland) Mariusz Pudzianowski	6
2	(Iceland) Jón Páll Sigmarsson	6
6	(United Kingdom) Jamie Reeves	4
6	(Lithuania) Zydrunas Savickas	4
6	(Ukraine) Oleksii Novikov	4
6	(Poland) Jarek Dymek	4
10	(Finland) Riku Kiri	3
10	(United Kingdom) Mark Higgins	3
10	(United Kingdom) Gary Taylor	3
10	(Finland) Jouko Ahola	3
10	(Norway) Svend Karlsen	3
10	(Sweden) Magnus Samuelsson	3
10	(United Kingdom) Luke Stoltman	3
10	(Georgia (country)) Konstantine Janashia	3
10	(Poland) Mateusz Kieliszkowski	3
10	(Poland) Krzysztof Radzikowski	3

=== Championships by country ===
Country	Gold	Silver	Bronze	Total
United Kingdom	12	12	10	34
Iceland	8	6	6	20
Poland	7	8	7	22
Finland	5	4	1	10
Netherlands	4	3	1	8
Lithuania	3	2	1	6
Ukraine	2	3	2	7
Austria	2	0	1	3
Sweden	1	2	3	6
Norway	1	0	2	3
Hungary	1	0	0	1
Denmark	1	0	0	1
Czech Republic	1	0	0	1
Georgia	0	1	2	3
Germany	0	1	1	2
