= 2017 World's Strongest Man =

Strongman competition in 2017

Competition information
- Dates: 20–28 May 2017
- Venue: Three Dikgosi Monument / Sir Seretse Khama International Airport
- Location: Gaborone
- Country: Botswana
- Athletes participating: 30
- Nations participating: 16

Champion(s)
- (United Kingdom) Eddie Hall

The 2017 World's Strongest Man was the 40th edition of the World's Strongest Man competition. It was held in Gaborone, Botswana from May 20 to 28. The tournament was won by Eddie Hall of the United Kingdom, with Hafþór Júlíus Björnsson of Iceland second and defending champion Brian Shaw of the United States third. Hall announced after the competition that he would not defend his title. Four-time champion Zydrunas Savickas of Lithuania finished in ninth place; this marked the first time in his career that he failed to finish in the top three after qualifying for the final.

== Participants ==
- Brian Shaw (United States)
- Jean-François Caron (Canada)
- Matjaz Belsak (Slovenia)
- Colm Woulfe (New Zealand)
- Tom Stoltman (United Kingdom)
- Mark Felix (United Kingdom)
- Hafþór Júlíus Björnsson (Iceland)
- Martins Licis (United States)
- Luke Stoltman (United Kingdom)
- Jimmy Paquet (Canada)
- Stefán Sölvi Pétursson (Iceland)
- Dimitar Savatinov (Bulgaria)
- Konstantine Janashia (Georgia (country))
- Laurence Shahlaei (United Kingdom)
- Mikhail Shivlyakov (Russia)
- Johan Els (South Africa)
- Rob Kearney (United States)
- Mikkel Leicht (Denmark)
- Eddie Hall (United Kingdom)
- Mateusz Kieliszkowski (Poland)
- Ari Gunnarsson (Iceland)
- Lauri Nämi (Estonia)
- Derek DeVaughn (United States)
- Gerhard Van Staden (South Africa)
- Nick Best (United States)
- Zydrunas Savickas (Lithuania)
- Peiman Maheripour (Iran)
- Terry Hollands (United Kingdom)
- Bryan Benzel (United States)
- Olu Fadesire (Nigeria)

== Heat Results ==
A change was made to the qualifying rounds for 2017. Each group participated in five normal events, with the highest scoring competitor at the end of those events being declared the group winner and automatically qualifying for the final. The lowest scoring competitor was eliminated from further competition.

In a throwback to early competitions, where a head-to-head competition determined the overall champion, the four remaining competitors faced off in an event called Last Man Standing. The event consisted of a hurdle placed in the middle of an octagon with a white square in the middle, in which was placed an Atlas Stone.

The event was conducted in a stepladder format, with the fifth place and fourth place competitors beginning the event. Each competitor took turns lifting the stone from their side of the square and dropping it over the hurdle. The lift had to be started from within the square and each competitor was given ten seconds to lift and drop the stone. Once one of them could not complete the task, he was eliminated from the event and the third place competitor stepped in. The survivor of that matchup took on the second place competitor, with the winner of the event joining the overall group winner in the final.

=== Heat 1 ===
#	Name	Nationality	Pts
1	Brian Shaw	United States	27
2	Jean-François Caron	Canada	24
3	Matjaz Belsak	Slovenia	21
4	Colm Woulfe	New Zealand	16.5
5	Tom Stoltman	United Kingdom	6
6	Mark Felix	United Kingdom	3.5

=== Heat 2 ===
#	Name	Nationality	Pts
1	Hafþór Júlíus Björnsson	Iceland	33
2	Martins Licis	United States	21
3	Luke Stoltman	United Kingdom	20
4	Stefán Sölvi Pétursson	Iceland	14
5	Jimmy Paquet	Canada	13
6	Dimitar Savatinov	Bulgaria	4

=== Heat 3 ===
#	Name	Nationality	Pts
1	Konstantine Janashia	Georgia	24.5
2	Laurence Shahlaei	United Kingdom	19
3	Mikhail Shivlyakov	Russia	18
4	Johan Els	South Africa	15
5	Rob Kearney	United States	15
6	Mikkel Leicht	Denmark	13.5

=== Heat 4 ===
#	Name	Nationality	Pts
1	Eddie Hall	United Kingdom	24.5
2	Mateusz Kieliszkowski	Poland	22.5
3	Ari Gunnarsson	Iceland	22.5
4	Derek DeVaughn	United States	13.5
5	Lauri Nämi	Estonia	10.5
6	Gerhard Van Staden	South Africa	7.5

=== Heat 5 ===
#	Name	Nationality	Pts
1	Nick Best	United States	22
2	Zydrunas Savickas	Lithuania	22
3	Peiman Maheripour	Iran	18.5
4	Terry Hollands	United Kingdom	17
5	Bryan Benzel	United States	13.5
6	Olu Fadesire	Nigeria	5

== Finals Events Results ==
=== Event 1: Tyre Flip ===
- 500 kg (1,102 lb) tyre for 6 flips
- Time Limit: 60 seconds

#	Name	Nationality	Time (sec)	Event Pts	Overall Pts
1	Brian Shaw	United States	27.28	10	10
2	Hafþór Júlíus Björnsson	Iceland	28.83	9	9
3	JF Caron	Canada	31.56	8	8
4	Mateusz Kieliszkowski	Poland	34.52	7	7
5	Eddie Hall	United Kingdom	35.12	6	6
6	Laurence Shahlaei	United Kingdom	39.87	5	5
7	Martins Licis	United States	39.93	4	4
8	Konstantine Janashia	Georgia	DNF (5 Flips)	3	3
9	Zydrunas Savickas	Lithuania	DNF (3 Flips)	1.5	1.5
9	Nick Best	United States	DNF (3 Flips)	1.5	1.5

=== Event 2: Squat Lift ===
- Weight: 317.5 kilograms (700 lb) for repetitions
- Time Limit: 60 seconds

#	Name	Nationality	Repetitions	Event Pts	Overall Pts
1	Eddie Hall	United Kingdom	15	10	16
2	Brian Shaw	United States	13	7.5	17.5
2	JF Caron	Canada	13	7.5	15.5
2	Martins Licis	United States	13	7.5	11.5
2	Zydrunas Savickas	Lithuania	13	7.5	9
6	Hafþór Júlíus Björnsson	Iceland	12	4.5	13.5
6	Laurence Shahlaei	United Kingdom	12	4.5	9.5
8	Nick Best	United States	6	3	4.5
9	Mateusz Kieliszkowski	Poland	3	2	9
10	Konstantine Janashia	Georgia	2	1	4

=== Event 3: Viking Press ===
- Weight: 160 kilograms (350 lb) for repetitions
- Time Limit: 60 seconds

#	Name	Nationality	Repetitions	Event Pts	Overall Pts
1	Eddie Hall	United Kingdom	15	10	26
2	Hafþór Júlíus Björnsson	Iceland	14	9	22.5
3	Brian Shaw	United States	12	8	25.5
4	JF Caron	Canada	8	6	21.5
4	Martins Licis	United States	8	6	17.5
4	Konstantine Janashia	Georgia	8	6	10
7	Laurence Shahlaei	United Kingdom	7	3.5	13
7	Mateusz Kieliszkowski	Poland	7	3.5	12.5
9	Nick Best	United States	3	2	6.5
10	Zydrunas Savickas	Lithuania	2	1	10

=== Event 4: Plane Pull ===
- Weight: 26,000 kilograms (57,000 lb)
- Course Length: 40 metres (130 ft)
- Time Limit: 60 seconds

#	Name	Nationality	Time (sec)	Event Pts	Overall Pts
1	Mateusz Kieliszkowski	Poland	40.07	10	22.5
2	Hafþór Júlíus Björnsson	Iceland	41.10	9	31.5
3	Eddie Hall	United Kingdom	42.92	8	34
4	Laurence Shahlaei	United Kingdom	44.14	7	20
5	Brian Shaw	United States	47.60	6	31.5
6	Zydrunas Savickas	Lithuania	47.73	5	15
7	Martins Licis	United States	49.30	4	21.5
8	Konstantine Janashia	Georgia	50.25	3	13
9	JF Caron	Canada	DNF 29.81 metres (97.8 ft)	2	23.5
10	Nick Best	United States	DNF 21.38 metres (70.1 ft)	1	7.5

=== Event 5: Max Deadlift ===
- Opening Weight: 380 kilograms (840 lb)

#	Name	Nationality	Weight Lifted	Event Pts	Overall Pts
1	Eddie Hall	United Kingdom	472.5 kilograms (1,042 lb)	10	44
2	Hafþór Júlíus Björnsson	Iceland	460 kilograms (1,010 lb)	8.5	40
2	Brian Shaw	United States	460 kilograms (1,010 lb)	8.5	40
4	JF Caron	Canada	440 kilograms (970 lb)	6	29.5
4	Martins Licis	United States	440 kilograms (970 lb)	6	27.5
4	Konstantine Janashia	Georgia	440 kilograms (970 lb)	6	19
7	Laurence Shahlaei	United Kingdom	400 kilograms (880 lb)	3.5	23.5
7	Zydrunas Savickas	Lithuania	400 kilograms (880 lb)	3.5	18.5
9	Mateusz Kieliszkowski	Poland	380 kilograms (840 lb)	1.5	24
9	Nick Best	United States	380 kilograms (840 lb)	1.5	9

=== Event 6: Atlas Stones ===
- 5 Atlas Stone series ranging from 150–210 kilograms (330–460 lb)
- Time Limit: 60 seconds

#	Name	Nationality	Time (sec)	Event Pts	Overall Pts
1	Hafþór Júlíus Björnsson	Iceland	5 in 28.99	10	50
2	Martins Licis	United States	5 in 33.24	9	36.5
3	Brian Shaw	United States	5 in 40.48	8	48
4	Eddie Hall	United Kingdom	5 in 58.74	7	51
5	JF Caron	Canada	4 in 29.41	6	35.5
6	Mateusz Kieliszkowski	Poland	4 in 33.01	5	29
7	Konstantine Janashia	Georgia	4 in 35.36	4	23
8	Zydrunas Savickas	Lithuania	3 in 19.76	3	21.5
9	Laurence Shahlaei	United Kingdom	3 in 45.66	2	25.5
10	Nick Best	United States	2 in 6.68	1	10

== Final standings ==
#	Name	Nationality	Pts
1st place, gold medalist(s)	Eddie Hall	United Kingdom	51
2nd place, silver medalist(s)	Hafþór Júlíus Björnsson	Iceland	50
3rd place, bronze medalist(s)	Brian Shaw	United States	48
4	Martins Licis	United States	36.5
5	Jean-François Caron	Canada	35.5
6	Mateusz Kieliszkowski	Poland	29
7	Laurence Shahlaei	United Kingdom	25.5
8	Konstantine Janashia	Georgia	23
9	Zydrunas Savickas	Lithuania	21.5
10	Nick Best	United States	10

Preceded by 2016 World's Strongest Man	2017 World's Strongest Man	Succeeded by 2018 World's Strongest Man
