= Robert Oberst =

American strongman and actor (born 1984)

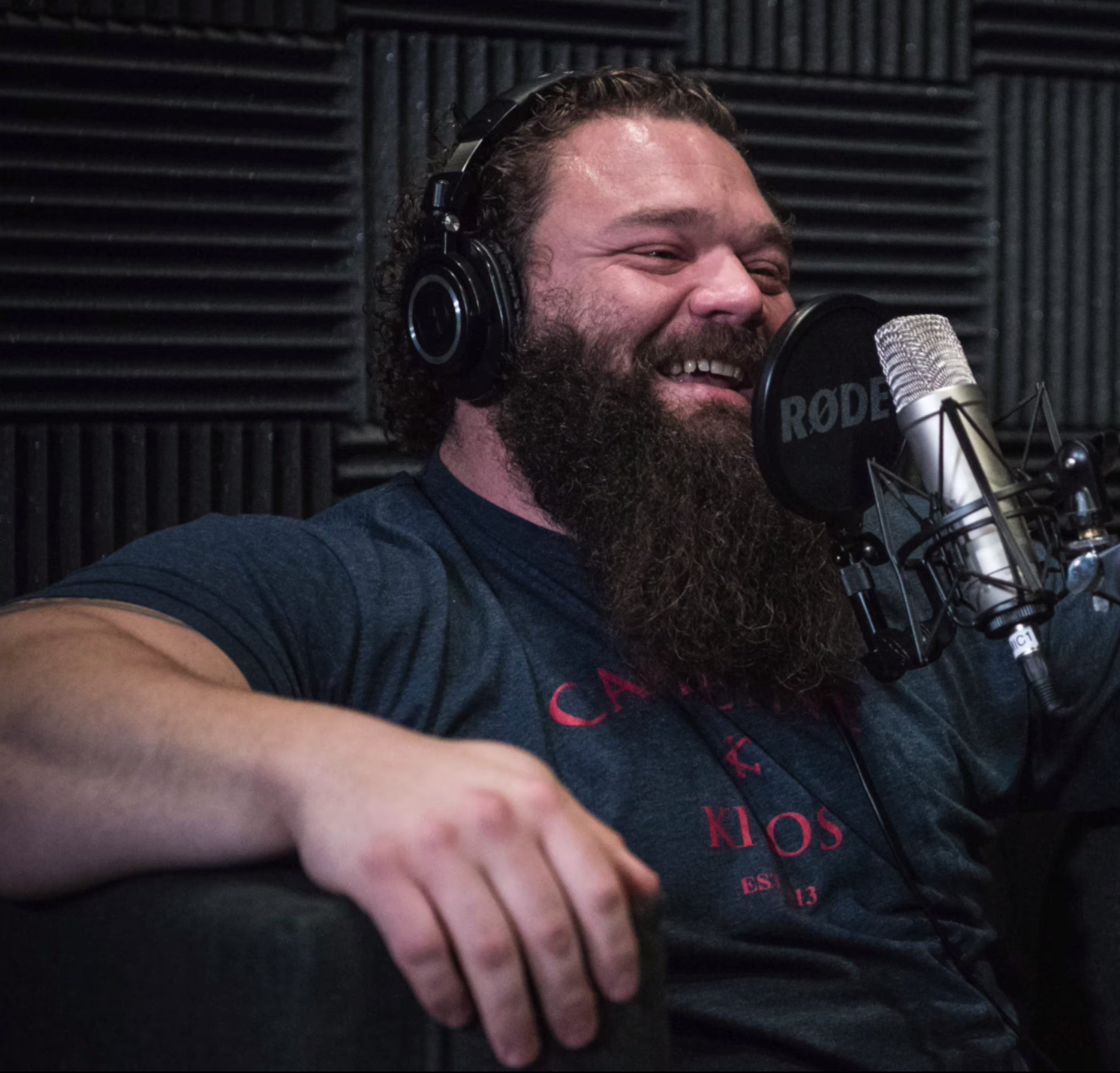

Personal information
- Other names: Obie
- Born: December 20, 1984 (age 41) Santa Cruz, California, U.S.
- Occupation: Strongman
- Height: 6 ft 7 in (201 cm)
- Weight: 375–440 lb (170–200 kg)
- Website: www.theamericanmonster.com

Competition record

Strongman

Representing United States

World's Strongest Man
9th	2013 World's Strongest Man
Qualified	2014 World's Strongest Man
Qualified	2015 World's Strongest Man
Qualified	2016 World's Strongest Man
8th	2018 World's Strongest Man
Qualified	2019 World's Strongest Man
Qualified	2020 World's Strongest Man
Qualified	2021 World's Strongest Man

Arnold Strongman Classic
8th	2014 Arnold Strongman Classic

Arnold Pro Strongman World Series
3rd	2015 Australia

Giants Live
6th	2013 British Open
6th	2016 North American Open
6th	2017 World Tour Finals

International Strongman Federation
1st	2017 New Braunfels Strongman

All-American Strongman Challenge
3rd	2013 Challenge

America's Strongest Man
3rd	2012 America's Strongest Man
2nd	2013 America's Strongest Man
2nd	2014 America's Strongest Man

China's Strongest Man
3rd	2013 China's Strongest Man

Robert Oberst (born December 20, 1984) is an American former strongman, and athlete.

He was a finalist in the 2013 and 2018 World's Strongest Man competitions ending up in 9th and 8th place, and emerged 8th in the 2014 Arnold Strongman Classic.

Oberst held the American national log lift record of 465 lb (211 kg) from 2015–2019.

== Early life and career ==
Oberst was born in Santa Cruz, California to European-American parents. From a young age, he was considerably taller than most of his family, and friends. His parents divorced when he was in high school.

Robert stood 6 ft 1 (185 cm), and weighed 220 lb (100 kg) at age 12. He was picked on as a result, and even thought about dropping out of high school because of it.

Oberst attended Aptos High School in Aptos, California, where he participated in football and track, and field. He then went on to continue playing football at the collegiate level at Western Oregon University majoring in history. Robert graduated from Western Oregon University in 2008.

After college, Robert gave the NFL a shot, but did not make the cut so got into bouncing at nightclubs Esta Noche and El Rio. It was there that one of Oberst's friends introduced him to strongman competitions. In four months of training, he received his pro-card.

He is known for advocating "People Shouldn’t Deadlift" on Joe Rogan's podcast, and recommends doing exercises such as cable lateral raises, dumbbell front raises and face pulls.

Robert competed in 15 international strongman competitions, and won New Braunfels Strongman competition organized by International Strongman Federation in 2017.

== Personal records ==
- Deadlift – 793 lb (360 kg) (2015 Arnold Australia)
- Log lift – 465 lb (211 kg) (2015 Arnold Australia)

== Strongman placements ==
- First Place, San Jose Fit Expo, 2012
- First Place, Dallas Europa, 2012
- Third Place, America's Strongest Man, 2012
- First Place, Sin City IV Strongman Challenge, 2013
- First Place, Odd Haugen's US Open MAS Wrestling Championship, 2013
- Third Place, All-American Strongman Challenge, 2013
- Sixth Place, Giants Live British Open, 2013
- Third Place, China's Strongest Man, 2013
- Ninth Place, World's Strongest Man, 2013
- Second Place, America's Strongest Man, 2013
- Fifth Place, MAS-Wrestling World Cup, 2013
- Eighth Place, Arnold Strongman Classic, 2014
- Second Place, America's Strongest Man, 2014
- Third Place, Arnold Strongman Classic Australia, 2015
- Sixth Place, Giants Live North American Open, 2016
- First Place, ISF1, 2017
- Sixth Place, Giants Live World Tour Finals, 2017
- Eighth Place, World's Strongest Man, 2018

== Retirement and other ventures ==
On December 2, 2022, Oberst announced his retirement at Shaw Strength podcast.

In 2023, Oberst made his television acting debut in the third season of HBO's The Righteous Gemstones, playing Karl Montgomery, an estranged cousin of the titular family.

== See also ==
- List of strongmen
