= List of world records and feats of strength by Hafþór Júlíus Björnsson =

In his illustrious career, Hafþór Júlíus Björnsson of Iceland broke 132 world records and showcased numerous other feats of strength across all notable strongman events, making him the most prolific record breaker of all-time, in all of strength sports.

Below list is a summary of his most notable world records and personal bests.

== Strongman ==
=== Deadlifts ===
- Deadlift – 510 kg (1,124 lb) standard bar with figure 8 straps and double-ply suit (2025 World Deadlift Championships at Giants Live Strongman Open) (former world record)

→ It is widely considered the single greatest lift and the most impressive feat of strength in human history. Hafþór also held the previous all-time world record with 505 kg (1,113 lb) during 2025 Eisenhart Black Deadlift Championships.
With these two lifts, Hafþór became the first man in history to deadlift over 500 kg (1,102 lb), twice and then thrice.

- Deadlift – 501 kg (1,105 lb) standard bar with figure 8 straps and single-ply suit (2020 World's Ultimate Strongman – Feats of Strength series) (world record)

→ The heaviest deadlift of all-time in a singly ply suit/ former all-time world record.
With this lift, Hafþór became the first man in history to deadlift over 500 kg (1,102 lb).

- Rogue elephant bar raw deadlift – 474.5 kg (1,046 lb) elephant bar, raw with standard straps (2019 Arnold Strongman Classic) (world record)

→ The heaviest strongman raw deadlift of all-time irrespective of the bar. Hafþór also held the previous world record with 472 kg (1,041 lb) during 2018 Arnold Strongman Classic.

- IronMind s-cubed bar deadlift – 460 kg (1,014 lb) stiff bar, single-ply suit with figure 8 straps (2017 World's Strongest Man) (former joint-world record)
- Standard bar raw deadlift (strongman) – 458 kg (1,010 lb) standard bar, raw with standard straps (2024 Rogue Invitational)
- Hummer tyre deadlift (from 15 inches) – 451 kg (994 lb) raw with standard straps (2014 Arnold Strongman Classic)
- Silver dollar deadlift (from 18 inches) – 520 kg (1,146 lb) single-ply suit with figure 8 straps (2018 World's Ultimate Strongman)
- Cart wheel deadlift (from 21 inches) – 526 kg (1,160 lb) raw with standard straps (2015 New Hampshire Highland Games) (former world record)
- Deadlift (for reps) – 400 kg (882 lb) x 7 reps (2026 Swaglift Day) (world record)
- Axle bar deadlift with wheels (for reps) – 380 kg (838 lb) x 6 reps (2018 Europe's Strongest Man) (world record)
- Axle bar deadlift with globes (for reps) – 350 kg (772 lb) x 10 reps (2019 Europe's Strongest Man) (former world record)
- Stiff bar deadlift (raw) (for reps) – 350 kg (772 lb) x 10 reps (2024 Arnold UK) (world record)
- Car deadlift (standard) (for reps) – 386 kg (851 lb) x 12 reps (2018 World's Strongest Man) (joint-world record)
- Car deadlift (side handles – from 15 inches) (for reps) – 390 kg (860 lb) x 13 reps (2015 SCL Bulgaria) (world record)
- Deadlift ladder – 300–400 kg (661–882 lb) x 6 reps (incremental weight loading) in 27.04 seconds (2015 Giants Live Iceland (Viking Challenge)) (world record)
- Human deadlift – 20 humans placed on the platform x 10 reps (2016 Arnold Brazil) (world record)
- Data deadlift – 282.6 Petabytes (3.18×10^{17} bytes) with Phison SSD drives in silver dollar setup (2024 SC24 VDURA, Atlanta) (world record)

=== Squats ===
- Circus barbell squat (for reps) – 340 kg (750 lb) x 7 reps (2019 World's Strongest Man)
- Circus barbell squat (for reps) – 317.5 kg (700 lb) x 12 reps (2017 World's Strongest Man)
- Keg drop squat – 270–360 kg (595–794 lb) x 7 reps in 27.50 seconds (2018 World's Strongest Man Group 1) (world record)

=== Presses ===
- Log press – 213 kg (470 lb) (2018 Europe's Strongest Man)
- Log press/ Austrian oak (for reps) – 195 kg (430 lb) x 3 reps (2017 Arnold Strongman Classic)
- Log press/ slater log (for reps) – 175 kg (386 lb) x 4 reps [has achieved this feat twice] (2015 Arnold Strongman Classic) & (2016 Arnold Strongman Classic)
- Strict log press with zero leg drive (for reps) – 155 kg (342 lb) x 9 reps (2019 World's Strongest Man Group 1)
- Axle press – 206 kg (454 lb) (2017 Europe's Strongest Man)
- Apollon's wheel press (for reps) – 181.5 kg (400 lb) x 4 reps (2018 Arnold Strongman Classic)
- Barbell push press (behind the neck) – 232.5 kg (513 lb) (2025 Arnold Strongman Classic)
- Barbell 'no contact' muscle clean and press – 188 kg (414 lb) (2017 WoW Stronger)
- Circus barbell press (for reps) – 163.5 kg (360 lb) x 8 reps (2016 World's Strongest Man) (joint-world record)
- Viking press (for reps) – 160 kg (353 lb) x 14 reps (2017 World's Strongest Man)
- Block press – 4 blocks ranging 90–120 kg (198–265 lb) – 38.11 seconds (2017 Strongest Man in Iceland)
- Cyr dumbbell press – 136 kg (300 lb) (2020 Arnold Strongman Classic)
- Cyr dumbbell press (for reps) – 124.5 kg (274 lb) x 4 reps [has achieved this feat twice] (2014 Arnold Strongman Classic) & (2016 Arnold Strongman Classic)
- Cyr (junior) dumbbell press (for reps) – 102 kg (225 lb) x 9 reps (2017 Festival des Hommes Forts de Warwick) (joint-world record)
- Circus dumbbell press (for reps) – 115 kg (254 lb) x 8 reps (2016 Arnold Brazil) (world record)
- Circus dumbbell press (for reps) – 105 kg (231 lb) x 9 reps (2017 Iceland's Strongest Man) (world record)
- Circus dumbbell press (for reps) – 100 kg (220 lb) x 10 reps (2013 Força Bruta) (former world record)
- Circus dumbbell press (for reps) – 95 kg (209 lb) x 13 reps (2014 Arnold Brazil) (world record)
- Overhead medley (2 x 105 kg (231 lb) circus dumbbell and 2 x 163 kg (359 lb) circus barbell) – 28.46 seconds (2014 World's Strongest Man)
- Overhead medley (160 kg (353 lb) log, 100 kg (220 lb) dumbbell, 160 kg (353 lb) axle and 140 kg (309 lb) shield) – 46.94 seconds (2018 World's Ultimate Strongman)

=== Yokes ===
- Viking ship mast (ormrinn langi) carry – 650 kg (1,433 lb), 10 metres (33 ft) long, 0.45 metres (1 ft 6 in) in diameter and 1.41 metres (4 ft 8 in) in circumference tree trunk for 5 steps (2015 World's Strongest Viking / SCL Norway) (world record)

→ Surpassing a 1,000+ years old legendary world record, which is considered the most historical strength record in Strongman.

- Viking ship mast super yoke – 410 kg (904 lb), 10 metres (33 ft) long log for 14 meters (2015 World's Strongest Viking / SCL Norway) (joint-world record)
- Super yoke – 453.5 kg (1,000 lb) (40 meter course) in 21.31 seconds (2014 Europe's Strongest Man)
- Super yoke – 481 kg (1,060 lb) (20 meter course) in 17.77 seconds (2013 World's Strongest Man)
- Super yoke – 500 kg (1,102 lb) (20 meter course) in 17.09 seconds (2015 World's Strongest Man)
- Super yoke – 510 kg (1,124 lb) (12 meter course) in 11.41 seconds (2013 Força Bruta)
- Super yoke – 580 kg (1,279 lb) (15 meter course) in 19.97 seconds (2018 World's Ultimate Strongman)
- Super yoke – 3 yokes [500 kg (1,102 lb), 550 kg (1,213 lb) and 600 kg (1,323 lb)] (10 meter course for each) in 54.14 seconds (2016 Arnold Africa) (world record)
- Bale tote – 680.5 kg (1,500 lb) (4 meter course) in 19.84 seconds (2016 Arnold Strongman Classic)
- Bale tote – 710 kg (1,565 lb) (4 meter course) in 28.65 seconds (2017 Arnold Strongman Classic)
- Car walk – 450 kg (992 lb) (30 meter course) in 12.84 seconds (2017 Europe's Strongest Man)
- Refrigerator carry – 450 kg (992 lb) with two XXXL refrigerators (20 meter course) in 19.60 seconds (2014 Guinness World Records, Italy) (world record)

=== Farmers ===
- Farmer's walk – 360 kg (794 lb) frame (40 meter course) in 24.16 seconds (raw grip) (2014 SCL Serbia)
- Farmer's walk – 181.5 kg (400 lb) in each hand for 28.6 meters (raw grip) (2024 Arnold UK)
- Farmer's walk – 145 kg (320 lb) in each hand and 154 kg (340 lb) in each hand (2 x 25 meter courses) in 27.76 seconds (Raw grip) (2017 Festival des Hommes Forts de Warwick) (world record)
- Farmer's walk – 150 kg (331 lb) in each hand (40 meter course) in 17.22 seconds (raw grip) (2014 SCL World Finals)
- Farmer's walk – 165 kg (364 lb) in each hand (25 meter course) in 11.05 seconds (raw grip) (2012 Jón Páll Sigmarsson Classic) (world record)
- Wheelbarrow carry – 400 kg (882 lb) (20 meter course) in 17.42 seconds (raw grip) (2015 Giants Live Iceland (Viking Challenge)) (world record)
- Timber carry – 500 kg (1,102 lb) (40-foot inclined ramp) in 10.15 seconds (with straps) (2015 Arnold Strongman Classic) (world record)
- Timber carry – 408.25 kg (900 lb) (40-foot inclined ramp) in 11.80 seconds (raw grip) (2018 Arnold Strongman Classic)
- Timber carry – 400 kg (882 lb) (40-foot inclined ramp) in 8.40 seconds (raw grip) (2024 Arnold Strongman Classic)

=== Flips & drags ===
- Flip & drag – 450 kg (992 lb) tyre x 4 flips & anchor and chain drag for 30 meters – 29.06 seconds (2017 Europe's Strongest Man) (world record)
- Tyre flip – 420 kg (926 lb) tyre x 8 flips – 26.48 seconds (2014 SCL Holland) (former world record)
- Tyre flip – 500 kg (1,102 lb) tyre x 6 flips – 28.83 seconds (2017 World's Strongest Man)
- Tyre drag – 500 kg (1,102 lb) tyre in a 25m course – 24.07 seconds (2012 Arnold Europe) (world record)

=== Stonelifting ===
- Manhood stone (Max Atlas stone) for reps – 250 kg (551 lb) x 2 reps over 4 ft (48 in) bar (2024 Strongest Man on Earth) (joint-world record)

→ Heaviest Manhood stone which has both: ever been lifted and ever been lifted for reps during a full competition.

- Atlas stones – 5 stones weighing 120–200 kg (264–441 lb) in 17.54 seconds (2017 Europe's Strongest Man) (world record)

→ Fastest Atlas stone run (with the heavy set) in strongman history, including one-motioning all five stones. It is generally considered the greatest and the most impressive stone run of all-time.

- Atlas stones – 5 stones weighing 130–186 kg (287–410 lb) in 19.46 seconds (2014 World's Strongest Man) (world record)
- Atlas stones – 5 stones weighing 130–190 kg (287–419 lb) in 15.95 seconds (2025 Iceland's Strongest Man) (world record)

→ Fastest Atlas stone run in strongman history involving one-motioning all five stones.

- Atlas stones – 5 stones weighing 140–200 kg (309–441 lb) in 18.16 seconds (2016 Europe's Strongest Man) (world record)
- Atlas stones – 5 stones weighing 150–210 kg (331–463 lb) in 26.80 seconds (2016 World's Strongest Man)
- Atlas stones – 5 stones weighing 160–200 kg (353–441 lb) in 33.96 seconds (2015 Giants Live Scandinavian Open) (world record)
- Atlas stones – 6 stones weighing 100–200 kg (220–441 lb) in 27.05 seconds (2014 Europe's Strongest Man) (world record)
- Atlas stone over bar – 200 kg (441 lb) x 8 reps over a 4 ft (48 in) bar (2026 Iceland's Strongest Man) (world record)

→ Including one-motioning the first 7 out of the 8 reps. Hafþór also held the previous world record during 2014 World's Strongest Team, where he did 7 consecutive reps and did an extra 8th after his teammate failed to add to the tally during the tag.

- Atlas stone over bar – 160 kg (353 lb) x 12 reps over a 4 ft (48 in) bar (2017 Strongest Man in Iceland) (world record)
- Atlas stone to shoulder – 142 kg (313 lb) x 8 cleans and reps (2014 Giants Live FitX Melbourne) (world record)
- Odd Haugen tombstone to shoulder – 186 kg (410 lb) [has achieved this feat twice] (2018 Arnold Strongman Classic) and (2019 Arnold Strongman Classic)
- Inver stones – 5 stones weighing 125–191 kg (275–420 lb) onto Whiskey barrels in 27.34 seconds (2024 Rogue Invitational) (world record)

→ The first and only instance in history where all five Inver stones were one-motioned.

- Inver stone press – 136 kg (300 lb) (2020 Arnold Strongman Classic) (joint-world record)
- Stone block press – 154.5 kg (341 lb) (2017 New Hampshire Highland Games) (former world record)
- Ross boulders press – 120–130 kg (265–287 lb) in 26.64 seconds (2015 World's Strongest Team) (world record)
- Natural stone lift to platform – 5 Rocks ranging from 137–170 kilograms (302–375 lb) in 25.52 seconds (2012 World's Strongest Man) (world record)
- Natural stone lift to platform – 4 Rocks ranging from 120–190 kilograms (265–419 lb) in 24.61 seconds (2016 Arnold Australia) (world record)
- Natural stone lift to platform – 5 Rocks ranging from 137–212 kilograms (302–467 lb) in 50.42 seconds (2019 Iceland's Strongest Man) (world record)

=== Stone carrying ===
- Húsafell Stone carry (around the pen) – 186 kg (410 lb) for 90.30 metres (296 ft 3 in) (around 2.7 revolutions) (2025 Iceland's Strongest Man) (former world record)
- Húsafell Stone carry (linear path) – 186 kg (410 lb) for 98.16 metres (322 ft 1 in) (2019 Iceland's Strongest Man) (world record)

→ Before establishing this, Hafþór broke the 25 year old world record of the event by carrying the stone 90 metres (295 ft 3 in) during 2017 Iceland's Strongest Man.

- Dinnie Stones carry (with Rogue replicas) – 2 stones weighing 187.3 kg (413 lb) & 145.6 kg (321 lb) for 10.72 metres (35 ft 2 in) (2024 Arnold Strongman Classic)
- Lundstrom Stones carry – 2 stones weighing 124.5 kg (274 lb) & 106 kg (234 lb) for 42.93 metres (140 ft 10 in) (2015 New Hampshire Highland Games) (world record)
- Jón Páll Sigmarsson stone carry – 221 kg (487 lb) for 79.04 metres (259 ft 4 in) (2014 New Hampshire Highland Games) (world record)
- Northumberland stone carry – 245 kg (540 lb) for 46.52 metres (152 ft 7 in) (2015 World's Strongest Team) (world record)
- Leggstein (tombstone) carry – 220 kg (485 lb) for 5 revolutions around the plinth (2010 Westfjord's Viking) (former world record)

→ Hafþór broke his own former world record of 4 revolutions around the plinth performed during 2009 Westfjord's Viking, which was his first ever strongman competition.

- Alfa-stein carry – 168 kg (370 lb) for 100 metres (328 ft 1 in) (2009 Eastfjord Strongman Championships) (world record)
- Shield carry – 190 kg (419 lb) for 80 metres (262 ft 6 in) course in 42.16 seconds (2012 Europe's Strongest Man) (world record)
- Mooring-bitt carry – 225 kg (496 lb) for 40 metres (131 ft 3 in) course in 29.94 seconds (2015 Giants Live Iceland (Viking Challenge)) (world record)

=== Throwing ===
- Keg toss – 12.5 kg (28 lb) over 8.54 metres (28 ft 0 in) (2014 New Hampshire Highland Games) (world record)

→ Hafþór has broken this world record a total of 7 times with both 'American 15.5 gallon keg' as performed during 2014 New Hampshire Highland games and 'European 50 litre keg' as performed during 2014 SCL China's Guinness World Records dual and 2014 Guinness World Records dual in Italy.

- Keg toss – 15 kg (33 lb) over 7.77 metres (25 ft 6 in) (2024 Strongest Man on Earth) (world record)

→ Hafþór also held the previous world record twice when he cleared 7.10 metres (23 ft 4 in), during 2015 Giants Live Sweden (Scandinavian Open) and 7.15 metres (23 ft 5 in), during 2016 World's Strongest Man Group 3.

- Keg toss – 25 kg (55 lb) over 6.00 metres (19 ft 8 in) (2012 Icelandic Highland Games) (world record)
- Keg toss (for speed) – 8 kegs (18–25 kg (40–55 lb)) over 4.90 metres (16 ft 1 in) in 16.35 seconds (2014 World's Strongest Man) (world record)
- Keg toss (for speed) – 7 kegs (18–25 kg (40–55 lb)) over 5.00 metres (16 ft 5 in) in 20.24 seconds (2015 Giants Live Scandinavian Open) (world record)
- Keg toss (for speed) – 6 kegs (18–28 kg (40–62 lb)) over 4.50 metres (14 ft 9 in) in 14.43 seconds (2013 SCL Latvia) (world record)
- Sandbag over bar (Max height) – 25 kg (55 lb) over 5.90 metres (19 ft 4 in) (2024 Iceland's Strongest Man) (world record)
- Sandbag over bar (Max weight) – 45.4 kg (100 lb) over 4.57 metres (15 ft 0 in) (2017 Arnold Strongman Classic) (world record)

→ Hafþór also held the previous world record when he hurled 41 kg (90 lb) sandbag the same day.

- Highland games one arm weight over bar – 25.5 kg (56 lb) over 6.20 metres (20 ft 4 in) (2026 Sherwook Park Highland Games) (world record)

→ Hafþór has broken this world record a total of 13 consecutive times ever since he did it first with 5.85 metres (19 ft 2 in) at 2014 New Hampshire Highland Games. He is also the only man who has ever cleared 5.95 metres (19 ft 6 in) or more, which he has done 10 times.

- Weight over bar (for speed) – 3 weights 25.5 kg (56 lb) over 5.48 metres (18 ft 0 in) in 8.64 seconds (2012 King of the Castle) (world record)
- David Webster memorial one arm sandbag over bar – 25.5 kg (56 lb) over 5.79 metres (19 ft 0 in) (2024 Arnold UK) (world record)
- Metal block throw – 20 kg (44 lb) for 7.42 metres (24 ft 4 in) (2009 Eastfjord Strongman Championships)

=== Loading & medleys ===
- Loading race – 100 kg (220 lb) sandbag, 110 kg (243 lb) sandbag & 120 kg (265 lb) sandbag in a 10m course into different height stairs – 16.06 seconds (2013 SCL Holland)
- Loading race – 5 x 110 kg (243 lb) sacks in a 15m course – 29.86 seconds (2015 SCL Finland)
- Loading race – 105 kg (231 lb) anchor, 125 kg (276 lb) anvil, 120 kg (265 lb) keg, 150 kg (331 lb) sandbag & 120 kg (265 lb) safe in a 10m course – 31.22 seconds (2018 World's Strongest Man) (world record)
- Loading race – 2 x 120 kg (265 lb) kegs & 2 x 125 kg (276 lb) sacks in a 12m course – 34.77 seconds (2014 World's Strongest Man Group 2)
- Loading race – 2 x 125 kg (276 lb) barrels & 2 x 125 kg (276 lb) sacks in a 12m course – 38.55 seconds (2014 Europe's Strongest Man)
- Loading race – 3 x 100 kg (220 lb) tyres in a 15m sand course – 36.07 seconds (2014 World's Strongest Man)
- Medley – 125 kg (276 lb) barrel, 125 kg (276 lb) tyre, 125 kg (276 lb) sack & 200 kg (441 lb) duck walk in a 30m course – 34.59 seconds (2015 Europe's Strongest Man) (world record)
- Medley – 140 kg (309 lb) in each hand farmer's walk & 180 kg (397 lb) Húsafell replica carry in a 40m course – 34.75 seconds (2013 SCL Brazil)
- Medley – 160 kg (353 lb) metal log carry & 320 kg (705 lb) tyre drag in a 25m course – 44.66 seconds (2013 SCL Holland) (world record)
- Medley – 350 kg (772 lb) frame carry & 3 x 100 kg (220 lb) sacks in a 20m course – 25.31 seconds (2014 SCL Finland)
- Medley – 2 x 110 kg (243 lb) sacks & 310 kg (683 lb) cart drag in a 10m course – 64.03 seconds (2017 World's Strongest Man Group 2)
- Power Medley – 140–156 kg (309–344 lb) log carry for 10m course and 771 kg (1,700 lb) sled drag for 10m course in 31.21 seconds (2025 Arnold Strongman Classic) (world record)
- Power Medley – 380 kg (838 lb) wheelbarrow (hay baler) farmers carry raw grip for 12.2m course and 4,127.5 kg (9,100 lb) tractor arm over arm pull for 10.5m in 90 seconds (2024 Strongest Man on Earth) (world record)

=== Dynamics ===
- Power stairs (3 x 200 kg (441 lb) duck walks / total of 18 steps) – 27.16 seconds (2014 Battle of the North) (world record)
- Power stairs (3 x 225 kg (496 lb) duck walks / total of 15 steps) – 35.37 seconds (2015 World's Strongest Man)
- Power stairs (204 kg (450 lb), 216 kg (476 lb) & 227 kg (500 lb) duck walks / total of 15 extra steep steps) – 47.11 seconds (2017 Festival des Hommes Forts de Warwick) (world record)
- Fingal's fingers – 5 fingers 200–320 kg (441–705 lb) in 32.99 seconds (2014 World's Strongest Man Group 2)
- Fingal's fingers into power stairs – 2 fingers 145–154 kg (320–340 lb) and 249.5–272 kg (550–600 lb) Duck walks / total of 10 steps) in 45.02 seconds (2024 Strongest Man on Earth) (world record)
- Norse hammers – 3 hammerhead fingers 300–400 kg (661–882 lb) (hammerhead weights excluding fingers are 161–172.5 kg (355–380 lb)) in 52.70 seconds (2015 World's Strongest Man Group 2) (world record)

=== Grip & other static holds ===
- Pillars of Hercules (Hercules hold) – 200 kg (441 lb) in each hand for 55.13 seconds (2019 Europe's Strongest Man)
- Crucifix hold – 13 kg (29 lb) in each hand for 1 minute 12.03 seconds (2010 Highland Viking)
- Thor's hammer hold – 30 kg (66 lb) for 50.78 seconds (2025 Giants Live Strongman Open)
- Viking sword hold – 27 kg (60 lb) for 1 minute 0.81 seconds (2014 World's Strongest Viking / Giants Live Norway)
- Battery hold – 20 kg (44 lb) for 1 minute 23.05 seconds (2014 Guinness World Records, Italy)
- Bar bending – 4 x iron rods (each with a 5/8 inch (1.6 cm) diameter) bent to U-shape in 30 seconds (around the neck position) (2013 Guinness World Records, Iceland) (world record)
- Thor's hammer one arm lift – 118 kg (260 lb) (2016 Rogue Record Breakers) (former world record)
- Deadlift static hold – 320 kg (705 lb) for 45.29 seconds (2019 World's Strongest Man)

=== Pushing & carries ===
- Basque circle – 363 kg (800 lb) 612° rotation (2018 World's Strongest Man Group 1) (world record)
- Basque circle – 340 kg (750 lb) 810° rotation (2015 SCL Croatia) (world record)
- Basque circle – 329 kg (725 lb) 900° rotation (2013 SCL Latvia) (world record)
- Basque circle – 300 kg (661 lb) 1,310° rotation (2015 SCL Bulgaria)
- Conan's wheel of pain – 9,072 kg (20,000 lb) 36.35 meters (119 1/4 feet) (2019 Arnold Strongman Classic)

=== Pulling ===
- Arm over arm cannon pull – 1,361 kg (3,000 lb) for 15 meters – 6.90 seconds (2012 King of the Castle) (world record)
- Arm over arm truck pull – 12,000 kg (26,455 lb) for 15 meters 'in slate tile terrain' – 29.02 seconds (2013 SCL World Finals) (world record)
- Arm over arm truck pull – 13,000 kg (28,660 lb) for 20 meters 'in cobblestone terrain' – 32.23 seconds (2014 SCL Serbia) (world record)
- Arm over arm truck pull – 15,500 kg (34,172 lb) for 15 meters – 30.56 seconds (2014 Battle of the North) (world record)
- Viking lumberjack tree-sledge pull – 900 kg (1,984 lb) harness only/ no rope for 24 meters 'in ice terrain' – 26.06 seconds (2014 World's Strongest Viking / Giants Live Norway) (world record)
- Viking boat pull (with the sails intact) – 3,000 kg (6,614 lb) harness only/ no rope for 25 meters 'in ice terrain' – 18.87 seconds (2015 World's Strongest Viking / SCL Norway) (world record)
- Car pull – 10 cars weighing 950 kg (2,094 lb) x each for 20 meters – 17.50 seconds (2014 Guinness World Records, Italy) (world record)
- Mini-bus pull – 2,150 kg (4,740 lb) harness only/ no rope for 30 meters 'uphill, in slate tile terrain' – 15.37 seconds (2014 SCL Finland) (world record)
- Jeep pull – 3,629 kg (8,001 lb) harness only/ no rope for 20 meters – 16.18 seconds (2024 SCL Dubai) (world record)
- Truck pull – 10,000 kg (22,046 lb) for 20 meters 'uphill' – 35.76 seconds (2011 SCL Canada) (world record)
- Truck pull – 10,000 kg (22,046 lb) for 30 meters 'uphill' – 57.94 seconds (2011 World's Strongest Man) (world record)
- Truck pull – 12,000 kg (26,455 lb) for 20 meters – 18.96 seconds (2016 Arnold Africa) (world record)
- Truck pull – 12,000 kg (26,455 lb) for 20 meters 'slight uphill' – 23.34 seconds (2013 SCL Holland) (world record)
- Truck pull – 12,000 kg (26,455 lb) for 22 meters 'extra uphill' – 34.36 seconds (2019 World's Strongest Man Group 1) (world record)
- Truck pull – 14,000 kg (30,865 lb) for 25 meters – 23.75 seconds (2015 SCL Croatia) (world record)
- Truck pull – 15,000 kg (33,069 lb) harness only/ no rope for 30 meters – 40.98 seconds (2014 SCL Holland) (world record)
- Truck pull – 16,000 kg (35,274 lb) for 25 meters 'uphill in sand terrain' – 40.19 seconds (2013 World's Strongest Man) (world record)
- Bus pull – 17,000 kg (37,479 lb) for 20 meters 'slight uphill' – 32.89 seconds (2015 SCL Finland) (world record)
- Bus pull – 18,000 kg (39,683 lb) for 25 meters 'in slate tile terrain' – 28.34 seconds (2014 SCL Malaysia) (world record)
- Firetruck pull – 20,000 kg (44,092 lb) for 25 meters – 30.21 seconds (2013 SCL World Truck Pull Championships) (world record)
- Truck pull – 21,773 kg (48,001 lb) for 30 meters – 35.67 seconds (2011 SCL Canada) (world record)
- Truck pull – 27,000 kg (59,525 lb) 'extra uphill' for 12.05 meters (2013 SCL World Finals) (world record)
- Bus pull – 28,123 kg (62,001 lb) for 25 meters – 36.05 seconds (2018 World's Strongest Man)
- Truck pull – 31,752 kg (70,001 lb) 'uphill' for 18.89 meters (2017 Festival des Hommes Forts de Warwick) (world record)
- Concrete-truck pull – 34,000 kg (74,957 lb) 'uphill' for 14.92 meters (2019 Iceland's Strongest Man) (world record)
- Aeroplane pull – 40,000 kg (88,185 lb) 'in a total 25 meter course with an extra uphill on the final meter' for 24.90 meters (2016 World's Strongest Man) (world record)

== Powerlifting ==
WRPF (World Raw Powerlifting Federation):

- Squat (raw with wraps) – 440 kg (970 lb) (2018 Thor's Powerlifting Challenge)
- Bench press (raw) – 250 kg (551 lb) (2018 Thor's Powerlifting Challenge)
- Deadlift (raw) – 410 kg (904 lb) (2018 Thor's Powerlifting Challenge)
- Total – 1,100 kg (2,425 lb) (2018 Thor's Powerlifting Challenge)

→ Hafþór's total at its time, was the fifth-highest raw superheavyweight powerlifting total of all-time, and the seventh-highest raw powerlifting total of all-time regardless of weight class.

Íslandsmót [20-23 age category]:

- Squat (raw with wraps) – 350 kg (772 lb) (2011 Íslandsmót)
- Bench press (raw) – 230 kg (507 lb) (2011 Íslandsmót)
- Deadlift (raw) – 350 kg (772 lb) (2011 Íslandsmót)
- Total – 930 kg (2,050 lb) (2011 Íslandsmót)

== Other ==
Unofficial WRs and other PRs during training:

=== Deadlifts ===
- Deadlift – 485 kg (1,069 lb) (standard bar with figure 8 straps and double-ply suit)
- Deadlift for reps – 460 kg (1,014 lb) x 2 reps (standard bar with figure 8 straps and double-ply suit)

→ Heaviest deadlift double ever with calibrated plates.

- Deadlift for reps – 440 kg (970 lb) x 3 reps (standard bar with figure 8 straps and single-ply suit) (unofficial former world record)
- Raw Deadlift – 480 kg (1,058 lb) (replica elephant bar, raw with straps) (unofficial world record)

→ Heaviest strongman raw deadlift ever irrespective of the bar.

- Raw Deadlift for reps – 455 kg (1,003 lb) x 2 reps (replica elephant bar, raw with straps) (unofficial world record)

→ First person in history to rep 1,000 lbs.

- Axle bar Deadlift (from 18 inches) – 482 kg (1,063 lb) (rogue axle, raw with standard straps)
- Snatch grip Deadlift – 320 kg (705 lb) x 3 reps (2 consecutive sets) (standard bar, raw and beltless with straps) (unofficial world record)
- One arm Deadlift (rolling thunder style) – 250 kg (551 lb) (standard thickness handle, raw grip)

=== Squats ===
- Squat – 460 kg (1,014 lb) raw with wraps (2018 Thor's Powerlifting Challenge) This lift was given 2 red lights out of 3 for inadequate depth at the competition, however in strongman standards and according to many analysts, the depth was acceptable to consider a good squat while detailed analysts have further argued the depth was exactly identical to his previous 3 white lighted lift through superimposition techniques and implies it was human error at judging.

→ Hafþór has also done 445 kg (981 lb) raw [has achieved this feat twice] and 440 kg (970 lb) raw.

- Squat for reps – 400 kg (882 lb) x 2 reps (raw with wraps)
- Squat for reps – 380 kg (838 lb) x 5 reps (raw with wraps) all reps paused at the bottom (unofficial world record)

→ Heaviest paused squat for reps ever. Hafþór has also done 325 kg (717 lb) x 8 reps under the same criteria.

- Squat for reps – 200 kg (441 lb) x 29 reps (raw with wraps) (unofficial world record)
- Axle bar Squat for reps – 332 kg (732 lb) x 8 reps (2 consecutive sets)

=== Presses ===
- Bench press – 245 kg (540 lb) raw
- Bench press for reps – 220 kg (485 lb) x 6 reps raw and 200 kg (441 lb) x 10 reps raw
- Reverse grip bench press for reps – 143 kg (315 lb) x 25 reps raw
- Incline bench press – 230 kg (507 lb) raw
- Incline dumbbell press – 100 kg (220 lb) dumbbells per hand x 7 reps performed after picking up the dumbbells from the floor one-handed, and positioning them himself (only person to perform this feat using 100 kg (220 lb) dumbbells) (unofficial world record)

→ Hafþór has also pressed them for 6 reps, 5 reps, and 4 reps (at high incline [twice] and low incline [twice]).

- Incline dumbbell press – 80 kg (176 lb) dumbbells per hand x 12 reps
- Dumbbell shoulder press – 80 kg (176 lb) dumbbells per hand x 5 reps and 66 kg (146 lb) dumbbells per hand x 13 reps
- Barbell strict press (overhead press without leg drive) – 200 kg (441 lb) and 180 kg (397 lb) x 2 reps (2 consecutive sets)
- Log strict press (overhead press without leg drive) for reps – 177 kg (390 lb) x 3 reps
- Viper press (one-motion log press without pausing at the shoulder) – 180 kg (397 lb)
- Barbell push press (behind the neck) – 227.5 kg (502 lb) x 2 reps (2025 Arnold Strongman Classic) This double occurred as a result of Hafþór dropping the weight before referee's down signal, having had to re-do the lift. On both occasions, he successfully lifted the weight.

→ Hafþór has also done 220 kg (485 lb) in training.

- Cyr dumbbell press (by one arm) – 146 kg (322 lb) (22 kg heavier than the original) (unofficial world record)
- Cyr dumbbell press (by one arm) for reps – 129 kg (284 lb) x 3 reps (5 kg heavier than the original)

=== Rows ===
- One arm dumbbell row – 150 kg (331 lb) x 5 reps

=== Stones ===
- Manhood stone (Max Atlas stone) – 260 kg (573 lb) over 4 ft (48 in) bar

→ Hafþór has also done 240 kg (529 lb) and 231 kg (509 lb) [has achieved this feat twice].
Generally, Atlas stones heavier than 227 kg (500 lb) are called Manhood stones.

- Manhood stone (Max Atlas stone) for reps – 228 kg (503 lb) x 2 reps over 4 ft (48 in) bar
- Atlas stone for reps – 205 kg (452 lb) x 5 reps over 4 ft 7 in (55 in) bar
- Atlas stone one-motion to platform – 205 kg (452 lb) to 4 ft 4 in (52 in) [has achieved this feat twice], and 200 kg (441 lb) to 4 ft 8 in (56 in) (unofficial world record)
- Atlas stone to shoulder – 160 kg (353 lb)
- Atlas stone overhead press – 115 kg (254 lb) x 4 reps (unofficial world record)
- Atlas stone one hand pick up – 10 kg (22 lb), 8 inch diameter stone
- Natural stone to shoulder – 194 kg (428 lb)
- Natural stone overhead press – 155 kg (342 lb) (unofficial world record)

→ Hafþór has also pressed a 137 kg (302 lb) stone and a 144 kg (317 lb) stone, back to back

=== Throwing & dynamics ===
- Keg toss – 15.5 kg (34 lb) over 8.00 metres (26 ft 3 in) (unofficial world record)

→ Before this throw, Hafþór also cleared 7.80 metres (25 ft 7 in) which was also above the official world record height for the 15 kg (33 lb) keg toss at that time.

- One arm weight over bar – 26.7 kg (59 lb) over 6.00 metres (19 ft 8 in) (2026 Iceland's Strongest Man) (unofficial world record) This performance was with a 1.2 kg (2.6 lb) heavier weight than the standard half hundredweight. He also held a former unofficial world record with a 6.00 metres (19 ft 8 in) clearance with a 25 kg (55 lb) weight at 2013 SCL Russia. That performance was more than 7 inches above the WR at the time, but it occurred during 56 lb versus 55 lb weight discrepancy era of 2012–2013.
- One arm sandbag over bar – 24 kg (53 lb) over 4.88 metres (16 ft 0 in) from 4.00 metres (13 ft 1 in) away from the bar (2025 Rogue Invitational, guest performance) (unofficial world record)
- Power stairs (3 x 225 kg (496 lb) duck walks / total of 15 steps) – 29.20 seconds (2014 Guinness World Records, Italy) (unofficial world record) This performance was more than 2 seconds faster than the WR, but it was disqualified due to a +0.1 second false start.

=== Grip ===
- Inch dumbbell one arm lift – 81 kg (179 lb) (3 kg heavier than the original) with a 2 3/8" (6.03 cm) diameter handle x 2 reps (one each with right and left hands)
- IronMind Rolling thunder (V1) – 109 kg (240 lb)
- Grip Genie Rolling thunder hold – 63.5 kg (140 lb) for 36.9 seconds
- Captains of crush – No.3 gripper (127 kg (280 lb)/ RGC 149 of pressure)
- Vald dynamo plus dynamometer – 106.5 kg (235 lb)
- Rogue anvil lift – 68 kg (150 lb)
- Grip Genie block lift – 42.5 kg (94 lb)
- Grip Genie hub lift – 27.5 kg (61 lb)
- Reeves double arm fingertip lift (31mm plates on EZ-bar) – 73.5 kg (162 lb)
- Barbell plate pinching – 50 kg (110 lb) Ivanko calibrated plate
- Barbell plate pinching (for reps) – 11 consecutive flipping pinches with 20 kg (44 lb) Rogue calibrated plate in 19 seconds
- Behind the back barbell static hold – 211 kg (465 lb) for 10 seconds (not to failure), 206 kg (454 lb) for 18 seconds (not to failure) and 143 kg (315 lb) for 55 seconds
- Behind the back axle static hold – 151 kg (333 lb) for 20 seconds (not to failure) and 111 kg (245 lb) for 36 seconds (not to failure) (the thickness of the Rogue Axle is 1 11/12" (49.3mm))

=== Calisthenics ===
- Push-ups – 53 reps (in 60 seconds) at a bodyweight of 160 kg (353 lb) (unofficial world record)
- Pull-ups – 10 reps at a bodyweight of 191.5 kg (422 lb) (unofficial world record)

=== Other ===
- Power twister – 110 kg (243 lb) Haoying gold dual spring power twister bent to U-shape

== Combined lifts ==
– Hafþór holds the heaviest combined brute strength supertotals of all-time across all following lift combinations:

- Deadlift, Overhead press & Manhood Stone:
  510 kg (1,124 lb) + 232.5 kg (513 lb) + 260 kg (573 lb) = 1,002.5 kg (2,210 lb).
  → More than 40 kg (88 lb) over anyone else.
- Deadlift, Squat, Log press & Manhood Stone:
  510 kg (1,124 lb) + 460 kg (1,014 lb) + 213 kg (470 lb) + 260 kg (573 lb) = 1,443 kg (3,181 lb).
  → More than 100.5 kg (222 lb) over anyone else.
- Deadlift, Squat, Bench press, Log press & Manhood Stone:
  510 kg (1,124 lb) + 460 kg (1,014 lb) + 250 kg (551 lb) + 213 kg (470 lb) + 260 kg (573 lb) = 1,693 kg (3,732 lb).
  → More than 91 kg (201 lb) over anyone else.
- Deadlift (equipped), Deadlift (raw), Squat, Bench press, Push press, Strict press & Manhood Stone:
  510 kg (1,124 lb) + 480 kg (1,058 lb) + 460 kg (1,014 lb) + 250 kg (551 lb) + 232.5 kg (513 lb) + 200 kg (441 lb) + 260 kg (573 lb) = 2,392.5 kg (5,275 lb).
  → More than 102 kg (225 lb) over anyone else.

– Hafþór is the only man to load a 500 lb+ Manhood stone, shoulder the 410 lb Odd Haugen tombstone, double lap the 410 lb Húsafell Stone around the pen and overhead press a 300 lb Inver stone. (The first feat is achieved by 27 men, the second by 13, the third by 8 and the fourth by 10, and Hafþór is the only man to achieve all four).

– Hafþór is the only man in history to both deadlift 1,000 lb+ and shoulder press 500 lb+ within the same competition.

– Hafþór is also the only man in history to have both a 1,000 lb+ squat and a 1,100 lb+ deadlift.
(He has deadlifted 500 kg+ 3 times, 1,000 lb+ 38 times (35 times 1,000–1,099 lb), and 900 lb+ 210 times (172 times 900–999 lb),
all of which are more than anyone else in history).
Details of: all 1,000 lb+ deadlifts.

== See also ==
- Competitive Strongman Record of Hafþór Júlíus Björnsson
