= Eddie Hall vs. Hafþór Björnsson =

2022 boxing match between World's Strongest Man competitors

- The Heaviest Boxing Match in History
- Date: 19 March 2022
- Venue: Dubai Duty Free Tennis Stadium
- Title(s) on the line: Titan weight belt

Tale of the tape
Boxer	(Iceland) Hafþór Björnsson	(United Kingdom) Eddie Hall
Nickname	"The Mountain"	"The Beast"
Hometown	Reykjavík, Iceland	Newcastle-under-Lyme, England
Pre-fight record	1–0–2	0–0–0
Height	6 ft 9 in (205 cm)	6 ft 2 in (188 cm)
Weight	152 kg (335 lb)	142 kg (313 lb)
Recognition	32 international titles including 2018 World's Strongest Man; World's Ultimate Strongman; 2x World's Strongest Viking; 3x Arnold Strongman Classic; 5x Europe's Strongest Man; International Sports Hall of Famer; Current 3x Deadlift World Record holder 510 kg (1,124 lb) and set over 100 world records	2017 World's Strongest Man; Former Deadlift World Record holder 500 kg (1,102 lb)

Result
- Björnsson wins via unanimous decision

Eddie Hall vs. Hafþór Björnsson, taglined 'The Heaviest Boxing Match in History' at its time, was a boxing match between Strongmen Hafþór Júlíus Björnsson and Eddie Hall who both won the World's Strongest Man, that took place on 19 March 2022.

Hall started the first round with continuous haymakers but Björnsson kept his composure and stuck to the basics, focusing on a solid jab and better footwork. Once Björnsson realized Hall's game plan, he took control of the fight by bludgeoning and knocking down Hall twice to the floor in rounds three and six. Hall sustained bleeding lacerations on top of both eyes and Björnsson won the fight via unanimous decision, having won all but the second round.

== Background ==
Both Hall and Björnsson went into the fight with numerous accolades in strength athletics. Hall holds the title of 2017 World's Strongest Man and won UK's Strongest Man and Britain's Strongest Man multiple times. Björnsson holds the title of 2018 World's Strongest Man and has placed in the top three positions of the competition every year since 2012. He is also the 2018 World's Ultimate Strongman, 2 times in a row World's Strongest Viking, 3 times in a row Arnold Strongman Classic champion, 5 times Europe's Strongest Man, 8 times Strongman Champions League champion, 9 times Giants Live champion, and 16 times Iceland's Strongest Man and Strongest Man in Iceland champion.

In 2016, Hall set a world record in deadlifting with 500 kg (1,102 lb) at the 2016 Europe's Strongest Man competition. However, Björnsson deadlifted 501 kg (1,105 lb) at the 2020 World's Ultimate Strongman - Feats of Strength series and broke the world record to the dismay of Hall. Immediately after breaking the world record, Björnsson challenged Hall to a boxing match, and the fight was officially announced in November 2020.

== Preparation ==
Despite Hall having prior experience in boxing and fighting in general, Björnsson didn't. Both underwent significant bodyweight and bodyfat reductions, where Hall dropped from 163 kg (359 lb) to 142 kg (313 lb) and Björnsson dropped from 208 kg (459 lb) to 144 kg (317 lb). Hall incorporated a lot of explosive punches, punching boxing machines and many athletes including gymnast Nile Wilson, pop star Peter Andre and his training partners as hard as he can. Björnsson learned the fundamentals of boxing first under Vilhjálmur Hernandez and then was coached by Billy Nelson and did two exhibition fights against ex-WBO European light-heavyweight champion Steven Ward in January 2021, 2010 Commonwealth Games Heavyweight Gold Medalist Simon Vallily in May 2021, and a third real fight versus Canadian professional arm-wrestler Devon Larratt in September 2021 and defeated him in the first round itself via technical knockout.

== Fight ==
=== Round 1 ===
The fight started with Hall continuously throwing haymaker punches from his right hand without landing on Björnsson due to his quick reflexes and footwork. At 1:46 remaining mark, Björnsson landed a jab which cut Hall's right eye. During the rest of the round, Hall's frequency in delivering heavy blows slowed down while Björnsson kept his composure. Björnsson won the first round.

=== Round 2 ===
Second round started with Hall connecting a right hand punch which moved Björnsson towards the ropes. Hall continued with his haymakers. At 1:45 remaining mark Björnsson landed another jab which cut Hall's left eye. At 0:42 remaining mark, Hall managed to connect and aided by losing his balance, Björnsson fell to the ground but stood up immediately. Hall won the second round.

=== Round 3 ===
Round three started with Björnsson sticking to the basics and landing frequent jabs. Hall bled from both eyes and did not bother to keep his guard up. He also continued to change the stance being too close to Björnsson who took the advantage and connected. The turning point of the fight came at 0:09 remaining mark where Björnsson connected clean and knocked down Hall, sending him to the floor at the corner of the ring. Björnsson convincingly won the third round.

=== Round 4 ===
Round four started with Björnsson attacking with swift jabs. Hall started to gas out and changed to a stance having kept distinctly leaning over to the right side mimicking the natural movement of a Fiddler Crab. Björnsson won the fourth round.

=== Round 5 ===
By fifth round Hall's fatigue was evident and the power and frequency of his initial haymakers had depleted. Björnsson kept his composure and continued with his constant jabs, connecting several times. Björnsson won the fifth round.

=== Round 6 ===
In the sixth and final round, things started slow but at 2:26 remaining mark, Björnsson who took advantage of Hall not keeping his hands up and elbows tucked, connected clean and knocked him down again, sending him to the floor for the second time. After managing to fend off exhausted Hall from delivering an anticipated haymaker during the rest of the round, Björnsson convincingly won the sixth round and the fight.

== Aftermath ==
On 20 April 2022, Hall got a tattoo on his foot stating "World’s Strongest Man - Hafthor Julius Bjornsson" to commemorate the fight and his loss.
