= Hafþór Júlíus Björnsson =

Icelandic strongman and actor (born 1988)

- Hafþór in 2017

Personal information
- Nicknames: The Mountain; Thor; Ljónið
- Born: Hafþór Júlíus Björnsson; 26 November 1988 (age 37) Reykjavík, Iceland
- Occupations: Strongman; Powerlifter; Actor
- Years active: 2009–present
- Height: 2.05 m (6 ft 9 in)
- Weight: 205 kg (452 lb) (Note: This is Hafþór's heaviest bodyweight for 2025, officially measured during 2025 World Deadlift Championships, in September.)
- Spouse: Kelsey Henson (m. 2018)
- Children: 2
- Website: hafthorbjornsson.com

Hafþór Júlíus Björnsson (Icelandic: [ˈhafθour ˈjuːlijʏs ˈpjœr̥sɔn]; transliterated as Hafthor Julius Bjornsson in English; born 26 November 1988) is an Icelandic professional strongman and actor. With 33 international titles, 61 total wins, 89 podiums and 132 world records which makes him the most prolific record breaker in the history of strength sports, he is widely regarded as one of the greatest and most decorated strength athletes of all-time.

The winner of the World's Strongest Man, the World's Ultimate Strongman, two times the World's Strongest Viking, three times the Arnold Strongman Classic, five times the Europe's Strongest Man, nine Strongman Champions League wins, eleven Giants Live wins and twelve times the Iceland's Strongest Man, he is the only person to have won the World's Strongest Man, the Europe's Strongest Man and the Arnold Strongman Classic in the same calendar year, which he achieved in 2018. Known by his epithets 'king of the deadlift' and 'king of the stones', he is also Eisenhart deadlift champion and the former all-time deadlift world record holder at 510 kg (1,124.36 lb). Revered for his brute strength, Hafþór is regarded by many strength analysts and experts as "the strongest man to have ever lived".

Hafþór has also appeared on television as an actor, portraying Ser Gregor "the Mountain" Clegane in the HBO series Game of Thrones for five seasons. He is often simply referred to as "Thor" or "the Mountain", the latter for his Game of Thrones character and his own massive size.

In March 2023, Hafþór was inducted into the International Sports Hall of Fame.

== Early life ==
Hafþór was born on 26 November 1988 in Reykjavík, Iceland. When he was eleven years old, his family moved to Kópavogur. He received his primary education at Grundaskóli and then Hjallaskóli hill school, but due to high levels of energy as a child, he had difficulty sitting in a classroom or concentrating on his studies. As a student at the polytechnic school in Breiðholt, he was enthusiastic about sports and played soccer and did gymnastics, before discovering his passion for basketball in eighth grade. He was also a chess player, with a Blitz rating of 800. He also loved playing video games.

A lanky teenager, Hafþór gained size and strength through daily exercise, combining basic movements (push-ups, chin-ups, and sit-ups) with working at his grandfather's farm during summers and lifting natural stones in the wilderness. His imposing height of 205 cm (6 ft 9 in) is shared with his parents; his father, Björn Þor Reynisson, is 203 cm (6 ft 8 in) and his mother, Ragnheiður Juliusdottir, is also tall. Hafþór's grandfather Reynir Ásgeirsson is also very tall and broad across the chest. Hafþór has two sisters: Bryndís Björg Björnsdóttir and Hafdís Lind Björnsdóttir.

== Basketball career ==
Hafþór Júlíus Björnsson
Personal information
- Height: 205 cm (6 ft 9 in)
- Weight: 105 kg (231 lb) (Note: This is Hafþór's body weight as a basketball player in his teens. For Strongman and boxing body weights, please refer to the respective sections.)

Sport
- Sport: Basketball
- Position: Center
- Club: 2004–2005 Breiðablik; 2005–2006 FSu; 2006–2007 KR; 2007–2008 FSu

Hafþór began his athletic career as a basketball player, playing as a center with a bodyweight of around 105 kg (231 lb). He started his senior team career for the Icelandic 1. deild karla club Breiðablik in 2004. The following season, he transferred to FSu Selfoss, but after about ten games, it was discovered that he had been playing with a broken bone in his ankle and required surgery. After recovering, in 2006, Hafþór moved to KR in the Icelandic top-tier Úrvalsdeild. After a screw in his ankle shattered, he had to undergo a second surgery in November, forcing him to miss the rest of the season.

To commence the 2007–2008 season, Hafþór moved back to play for FSu Selfoss and averaged 6.7 points per game, helping the team to achieve a promotion to the Úrvalsdeild. His ankle injury persisted and ultimately forced him to retire from basketball at the age of nineteen, ending his dream of making it to the NBA one day.

Between 2004 and 2006, Hafþór played 32 games for the Iceland junior national basketball teams and 8 with Iceland's U-18 national team in Division A of the U18 European Championship. In May 2004, he won the Nordic championship with the U-16 team. During the 2004 FIBA Europe Under-16 Championship Division B, he helped Iceland achieve promotion to Division A. In 2006, he won the Nordic championship again, this time with the U-18 team. During the 2006 FIBA Europe Under-18 Championship, he was a member of the Iceland team that handed eventual champions France its only defeat in the tournament.

== Strongman career ==
Hafþór Júlíus Björnsson
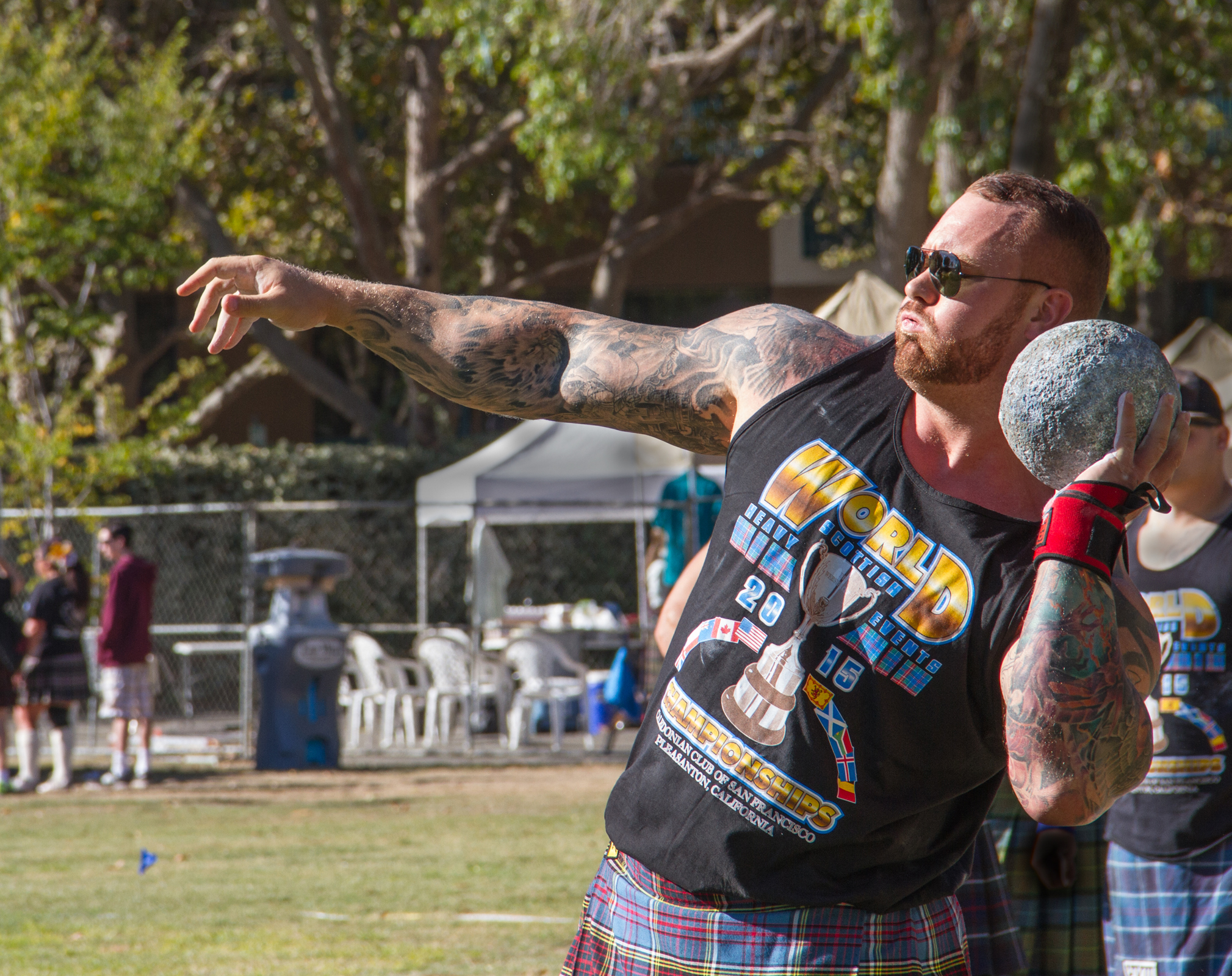
- Hafþór at the 2015 Caledonian Club Highland Games, trying the 12 kg Scottish Stone Put

Personal information
- Height: 205 cm (6 ft 9 in)
- Weight: 180–210 kg (397–463 lb)

YouTube information
- Channel: Hafthor Bjornsson
- Years active: 2013–present
- Genre: Strength training/Strongman
- Subscribers: 1.06 million
- Views: 575.55 million
- Last updated: 21 November 2026

Sport
- Sport: Strongman
Medal record
Representing Iceland
World's Strongest Man
6th	2011 World's Strongest Man
3rd	2012 World's Strongest Man
3rd	2013 World's Strongest Man
2nd	2014 World's Strongest Man
3rd	2015 World's Strongest Man
2nd	2016 World's Strongest Man
2nd	2017 World's Strongest Man
1st	2018 World's Strongest Man
3rd	2019 World's Strongest Man
Arnold Strongman Classic
10th	2012 Arnold Strongman Classic
8th	2013 Arnold Strongman Classic
5th	2014 Arnold Strongman Classic
7th	2015 Arnold Strongman Classic
5th	2016 Arnold Strongman Classic
2nd	2017 Arnold Strongman Classic
1st	2018 Arnold Strongman Classic
1st	2019 Arnold Strongman Classic
1st	2020 Arnold Strongman Classic
4th	2024 Arnold Strongman Classic
3rd	2025 Arnold Strongman Classic
World's Ultimate Strongman
1st	2018 World's Ultimate Strongman
Rogue Invitational
2nd	2024 Rogue Invitational
Shaw Classic
2nd	2024 Strongest Man on Earth
World's Strongest Viking
1st	2014 World's Strongest Viking
1st	2015 World's Strongest Viking
Europe's Strongest Man
1st	2014 Europe's Strongest Man
1st	2015 Europe's Strongest Man
2nd	2016 Europe's Strongest Man
1st	2017 Europe's Strongest Man
1st	2018 Europe's Strongest Man
1st	2019 Europe's Strongest Man
Giants Live
1st	2014 FitX Australia
1st	2015 Giants Live Iceland (Viking Challenge)
1st	2015 Sweden
1st	2025 World Open
1st	2026 World Open
Strongman Champions League
1st	2013 Latvia
2nd	2013 FIBO Germany
2nd	2013 Netherlands
2nd	2013 China
3rd	2013 Russia
3rd	2013 Brazil
1st	2014 Serbia
1st	2014 Finland
1st	2014 Netherlands
1st	2014 Malaysia
1st	2015 Bulgaria
1st	2015 Croatia
1st	2024 Dubai
Arnold Pro Strongman World Series
1st	2016 Arnold Brazil
1st	2016 Arnold Australia
1st	2016 Arnold South Africa
1st	2017 Forts de Warwick
2nd	2024 Arnold UK
Jón Páll Sigmarsson Classic
2nd	2010 Jón Páll Sigmarsson Classic
1st	2012 Jón Páll Sigmarsson Classic
Siberian Power Show
2nd	2025 Siberian Power Show
Força Bruta
2nd	2013 Força Bruta
3rd	2014 Força Bruta
Battle of the North
1st	2014 Battle of the North
King of the Castle
1st	2012 King of the Castle
WoW Stronger
1st	2017 WoW Stronger
World's Strongest Team
1st	2012 World's Strongest Team (with Jarno Jokinen)
1st	2015 World's Strongest Team (with Matjaz Belsak)
Iceland's Strongest Man
3rd	2010 Iceland's Strongest Man
1st	2011 Iceland's Strongest Man
1st	2012 Iceland's Strongest Man
1st	2013 Iceland's Strongest Man
1st	2014 Iceland's Strongest Man
1st	2015 Iceland's Strongest Man
1st	2016 Iceland's Strongest Man
1st	2017 Iceland's Strongest Man
1st	2018 Iceland's Strongest Man
1st	2019 Iceland's Strongest Man
1st	2020 Iceland's Strongest Man
1st	2024 Iceland's Strongest Man
1st	2025 Iceland's Strongest Man
2nd	2026 Iceland's Strongest Man
Strongest Man in Iceland
1st	2010 Strongest Man in Iceland
1st	2011 Strongest Man in Iceland
1st	2012 Strongest Man in Iceland
1st	2016 Strongest Man in Iceland
1st	2017 Strongest Man in Iceland
Iceland's Strongest Viking
1st	2010 Iceland's Strongest Viking
1st	2011 Iceland's Strongest Viking
1st	2012 Iceland's Strongest Viking
Westfjord's Viking
1st	2010 Westfjord's Viking
1st	2011 Westfjord's Viking
1st	2012 Westfjord's Viking
Eastfjord Strongman Championships
2nd	2009 East Coast Giant
1st	2010 East Coast Giant
1st	2012 East Coast Giant
Highland Viking
3rd	2009 Highland Viking
1st	2010 Highland Viking
Grundarfjord Viking
3rd	2009 Grundarfjord Viking
Akranes Strength Challenge
1st	2011 Akranes Strength Challenge
OK Budar Strongman Championships
1st	2010 OK Budar
	Outside of World's Strongest Man and Arnold Strongman Classic this list contains only the podium finishes. A full list is given under Competitive record

After recovering from the ankle injury, and inspired by both Ronnie Coleman and Dorian Yates, Hafþór trained like a bodybuilder for two years. He was later drawn towards the sport of Strongman after being inspired by Jón Páll Sigmarsson and his Icelandic heritage. One day, when Benedikt Magnússon spotted the twenty-year-old, 6 ft 9 in, 140 kg (309 lb) Hafþór training, he brought to his attention that a strongman competition was taking place the next day and encouraged him to participate. Hafþór then contacted Magnús Ver Magnússon and reserved his spot.

=== 2009 ===
In his very first competition 2009 Westfjord's Viking, Hafþór secured a fourth place finish. The champion Stefán Sölvi Pétursson won all but the second event which was the Leggstein (tombstone) carry. Despite having no formal strongman training, young Hafþór surprised the field by carrying the 220 kg (485 lb) stone four revolutions around the plinth, breaking the world record. Stefán Sölvi volunteered to coach the youngster and shared his own equipment and gear with him. With the new found friendship, Hafþór kept on improving and won third place in both Grundarfjord Viking and Highland Viking competitions. In 2009 East Coast Giant/ Eastfjord strongman championships, Hafþór won second place behind Páll Logason and broke another world record in the Alfastein carry, with a distance of 100 metres (328 ft 1 in).

=== 2010 ===
The following year, while training at the 'Strongman Base gym', Hafþór was nicknamed Ljónið (the Lion) by Stefán Sölvi, because he continuously grew bigger and got stronger, eventually exceeding 200 kg (441 lb) bodyweight by now. In addition to winning a few other local competitions, Hafþór won Iceland's Strongest Viking and Strongest Man in Iceland, the third and second highest ranking competitions in Iceland, and placed third behind reigning two-times champion Stefán Sölvi Pétursson and Benedikt Magnússon in the 2010 Iceland's Strongest Man, the main national competition. At the Westfjord's Viking competition, Hafþór also managed to break his own Leggstein carry world record. Taking part in his very first international strongman competition, Hafþór emerged runner-up to reigning World's Strongest Man runner-up Brian Shaw by 1 point at the inaugural Jón Páll Sigmarsson Classic.

=== 2011 ===
Hafþór entered the Arnold Sports Festival's limelight after winning second place in the 2011 Arnold Amateur competition in USA behind Mateusz Baron, which was also his first-ever competition abroad. He also got selected to Giants Live and Strongman Champions League, finishing fourth at 2011 Giants Live Poland and fifth at 2011 SCL Canada. The two federations gaveHafþór the opportunity for international exposure, competing against the best strongmen in the world. After earning a wild card invitation, Hafþór got selected to 2011 World's Strongest Man where he and Stefán Sölvi Pétursson both managed to qualify to the finals. At 22 years and 300 days, he became the fourth-youngest WSM finalist in history and secured sixth place in his first WSM appearance, including a world record in the Truck pull event.

In the local circuit, Hafþór won Iceland's Strongest Viking, Strongest Man in Iceland and Iceland's Strongest Man, becoming the first man to win all three Icelandic majors and became the ninth Icelander to win Iceland's Strongest Man (Iceland's most prestigious title) since its inception in 1985. Hafþór also won his first Icelandic Highland Games competition in Akranes.

=== 2012 ===
Hafþór won his first international strongman competition after dominating 2012 King of the Castle competition held in Hämeenlinna, Finland. At 2012 Europe's Strongest Man competition he turned up at a career heaviest bodyweight of 210 kg (463 lb) and placed fifth, including a world record in the shield carry event. at 2012 World's Strongest Man he won his first WSM podium finish by placing third behind Žydrūnas Savickas and Vytautas Lalas with two event wins which included a world record in the natural stone loading event. He also won his second international title, the 2012 Jón Páll Sigmarsson Classic with another world record performance in the Farmer's walk event.

Being widely recognized the heaviest and most difficult strongman contest in the world, Hafþór first participated in the Arnold Strongman Classic finals, held annually in Columbus, Ohio, in 2012, placing tenth (last place). Tournament director Terry Todd encouraged Hafþór to keep improving his static strength and predicted that he can win this competition one day. Furthermore, Hafþór broke the tyre drag world record at 2012 Arnold Europe competition and together with Jarno Jokinen, won Ultimate Strongman World's Strongest Team competition held in Mullingar, Ireland. In the local context, Hafþór repeated his Icelandic majors threepeat, and tossed a 25 kg (55 lb) keg, over 6 metres (19 ft 8 in) at the 2012 Icelandic Highland Games, thus breaking both Riku Kiri's 20 kg (44 lb) and Gary Taylor's 25 kg (55 lb) keg-toss world records.

=== 2013 ===
Hafþór started to compete prolifically and completed 14 international competitions in 2013. Among them, he won 2013 Strongman Champions League Latvia, his third international win along with a world record in Basque circle, and another world record in the arm over arm truck pull at the 2013 SCL World Finals in Malaysia. He also broke the 100 kg (220 lb) circus dumbbell for reps world record in 2013 Força Bruta competition (Arnold Pro Strongman World Series South America) held in Rio de Janeiro on his way to winning second place. He also won silver medals in 2013 SCL FIBO in Cologne, 2013 SCL Holland, 2013 SCL China and bronze medals in 2013 SCL Russia in Vladivostok and 2013 SCL Brazil.

At the 2013 World's Strongest Man, Hafþór won his second consecutive podium finish, placing third behind Shaw and Savickas. At the Arnold Strongman Classic, he improved his tenth place finish from last year to eighth place and improved his fifth place to fourth at the 2013 Europe's Strongest Man in Leeds, England. Hafþór also broke multiple vehicle pull world records most notably at 2013 SCL World Truck Pull Championships in Alahärmä, Finland and 2013 SCL World Finals in Kuala Lumpur, Malaysia. He only did one national competition in 2013 and secured his third consecutive Iceland's Strongest Man title.

Hafþór also broke a Guinness world record in the bar bending discipline when he bent 4 x iron rods (each with a 5/8 inch (1.6 cm) diameter) into U-shape in 30 seconds.

=== 2014 ===
Hafþór started his 2014 by winning the inaugural World's Strongest Viking competition held in Vinstra, Norway, with a world record in Viking lumberjack tree-sledge pull event. He also won his first Europe's Strongest Man title. After breaking the world record in the six-piece Atlas stones run, loading all six stones weighing 100–200 kg (220–441 lb) onto whiskey barrels within 27.05 seconds, Hafþór said "I'm the future of strength, and I'm king of the stones!"

At the 2014 World's Strongest Man in a stacked lineup of 12 athletes in the finals, Hafþór came very close to winning the title, when he finished only half a point behind Savickas, and two and a half points ahead of Shaw. He also broke world records in the Atlas stones and keg-toss for speed events after an duel with Shaw. Shaw tossed all eight kegs weighing 18–25 kg (40–55 lb) over the 4.90 metres (16 ft 1 in) bar in 16.59 seconds and proclaimed "I don't think that's beatable", only for Hafþór, competing next, to finish it in 16.35 seconds. Hafþór also improved his Arnold Strongman Classic placement to fifth.

Hafþór continued to compete prolifically and completed 13 international competitions in 2014. He won his first Giants Live title by winning 2014 Giants Live FitX Australia held in Melbourne with a world record in the Atlas stone to shoulder for reps event, and also won the 2014 Battle of the North competition held in Tórshavn, Faroe Islands, 2014 SCL Serbia, 2014 SCL Finland, 2014 SCL Holland and 2014 SCL world final taking his international title tally to 11.

From 2014 onwards, Hafþór took part in various Highland games competitions in the USA and broke the all-time world records in 12.5 kg (28 lb) keg-toss for height and weight over bar events. He also broke the world record in the 221 kg (487 lb) Jón Páll Sigmarsson stone carry and loaded a 200 kg (441 lb) Atlas stone for eight reps all by himself at the World's Strongest Team competition held in Stoke-on-Trent, England.

Hafþór also performed in a Guinness World Records duel with Žydrūnas Savickas in Milan, Italy where they collectively broke seven world records.

=== 2015 ===
Hafþór won his second consecutive World's Strongest Viking title. In this competition, he carried a 10 metres (33 ft) long, 0.45 metres (1 ft 6 in) in diameter, 650 kg (1,433 lb) tree trunk, for five steps, thus breaking a legendary 1,000-year-old world record, set by the Viking Orm Storolfsson, who was said to have carried it for three steps. He also broke the Viking boat pull world record in the same competition.

He also won his second consecutive Europe's Strongest Man title, two more Giants Live titles: 2015 Giants Live Iceland (Viking Challenge) and 2015 Giants Live Sweden (Scandinavian Open), and two more Strongman Champions League titles: 2015 Strongman Champions League Bulgaria and 2015 Strongman Champions League Croatia, taking his international title tally to 17. During these competitions, he established world records in car deadlift, deadlift ladder, wheelbarrow carry, mooring-bitt carry, 15 kg (33 lb) keg toss, 160–200 kg (353–441 lb) Atlas stones run, Basque circle, and several bus and truck pull events.

At the 2015 World's Strongest Man he secured his fourth consecutive podium finish, placing third behind Shaw and Savickas. He was the only man to topple all 3 Norse hammers for a new world record with the final hammer weighing 400 kg (882 lb). Despite breaking the Timber carry world record with 500 kg (1,102 lb) worth of barn timber carried on a 40 feet inclined ramp in 10.15 seconds, Hafþór dropped to seventh place at the Arnold Strongman Classic due to a costly mistake in weight selections for the hummer tyre deadlift. At the 2015 World's Strongest Team competition, Hafþór and Matjaz Belsak who competed as team 'Vikings' emerged champions over team Saxons (Mark Felix and Eddie Hall), team Yankees (Mike Burke and Jerry Pritchett) and five more teams. During this competition Hafþór pressed the Ross boulder overhead and carried David P. Webster's 245 kg (540 lb) Northumberland stone for 46.52 metres (152 ft 7 in) for two more world records.

At 2015 New Hampshire Highland Games, Hafþór broke Jón Páll Sigmarsson's iconic elevated cart wheel deadlift world record with a pull of 526 kg (1,160 lb) in addition to breaking the Lundstrom Stones carry world record and the Weight over bar world record for the third time.

=== 2016 ===
Hafþór climbed back to fifth spot at the Arnold Strongman Classic in Columbus, Ohio and managed to win 2016 Arnold Pro Strongman World Series Australia, 2016 Arnold Pro Strongman World Series South America and 2016 Arnold Pro Strongman World Series Africa with world records in human platform deadlift, 115 kg (254 lb) circus dumbbell press for reps, triple super yoke, natural stones loading and Thor's hammer one arm lift eventually taking his international title tally to 20.

In 2016 Europe's Strongest Man, despite doing well in other events including a world record in loading the five 140–200 kg (309–441 lb) Atlas stones in 18.16 seconds, he made a blunder at the car walk by gripping the apparatus from the center instead of the sides which compromised his balance, a mistake which cost his title to Laurence Shahlaei.

In 2016 World's Strongest Man, Hafþór came close to winning the title and emerged runner-up to Shaw by two points to secure his fifth consecutive podium finish. During this competition, he broke another Atlas stones world record by loading five 150–210 kg (331–463 lb) stones in 26.80 seconds, shared the circus barbell shoulder press for reps world record and also established another world record in the Aeroplane pull by pulling a 40,000 kg (88,185 lb) plane in a total 25 meter course with an extra uphill on the final meter for 24.90 meters.

Hafþór broke the Weight over bar world record for the fifth time at Caledonian Club Highland Games, and in the national circuit, won his sixth consecutive Iceland's Strongest Man title (surpassing Jón Páll Sigmarsson) and fourth Strongest Man in Iceland title. He also initiated his own training facility 'Thor's Power Gym'.

=== 2017 ===
At the Arnold Strongman Classic, Hafþór emerged runner-up to Shaw with his best performance in the competition up to this point. He broke the world record in the Rogue bag over bar for max weight by throwing a 45.4 kg (100 lb) sandbag over a 4.57 metres (15 ft 0 in) bar and pressed the 195 kg (430 lb) Austrian Oak log for 3 repetitions.

In 2017 Europe's Strongest Man after an iconic battle with Eddie Hall Hafþór won his third title, and famously answered Bill Kazmaier, "This is not a beauty contest, this is Strongman!" amidst a Bell's palsy affected face. He Axle pressed 206 kg (454 lb) and broke the world record in loading the five 120–200 kg (264–441 lb) Atlas stones (Giants Live heavy set) in 17.54 seconds, one-motioning all the stones.

In 2017 World's Strongest Man Hafþór again came close to winning the title but ended runner-up to Hall by one point and secured his sixth consecutive podium finish. He deadlifted 1,000 lbs+ for the first time in his career and squatted 317.5 kg (700 lb) for 12 repetitions despite returning from a recent quad tear.

Hafþór proceeded to win 2017 Festival des Hommes Forts de Warwick and 2017 WoW Stronger, taking his international title tally to 23 and during the latter, surpassed Paul Anderson's 185 kg (408 lb) power clean and press from 1955 World Championships, Munich with a 188 kg (414 lb) muscle clean and press. He also broke the block press world record with 154.5 kg (341 lb) and squatted 200 kg (441 lb) raw for 29 repetitions.

In the national circuit, he won his seventh consecutive Iceland's Strongest Man and fifth Strongest Man in Iceland titles. During 2017 Iceland's Strongest Man, he surpassed both Andrés Guðmundsson's near two full revolutions around the pen and Gregg Ernst's linear 70 metres (229 ft 8 in) which eluded everyone for more than 25 years, by carrying the legendary Húsafell Stone 90 metres (295 ft 4 in) for a new all-time world record.

=== 2018 ===
2018 marked the most dominant calendar year in strongman history with Hafþór winning the Arnold Strongman Classic, Europe's Strongest Man, World's Strongest Man, Iceland's Strongest Man and World's Ultimate Strongman, while remaining undefeated.

Hafþór defeated the defending champion, Brian Shaw, and won the 2018 Arnold Strongman Classic, becoming only the seventh person to win the prestigious title, fulfilling Dr. Terry Todd's vision just four months prior his demise. In the fourth event, he broke the elephant bar deadlift world record with 472 kg (1,041 lb), beating Jerry Pritchett's 467.5 kg (1,031 lb) from previous year, to establish the heaviest raw deadlift in strongman history. Hafþór also shouldered the Odd Haugen tombstone and pressed the 181.5 kg (400 lb) Apollon's Axle and wheels for 4 repetitions.

With a near strict log press of 213 kg (470 lb) which made him World Log-lift Champion, and an Axle deadlift world record for reps of 380 kg (838 lb) for six repetitions, Hafþór won the 2018 Europe's Strongest Man, winning his fourth title, becoming the second highest ESM winner in history.

After six consecutive podium finishes and three times getting so close to winning the title, Hafþór finally became the World's Strongest Man in 2018, winning the competition by six-and-a-half points over the runner-up, Mateusz Kieliszkowski. Hafþór became the third Icelander to win the title, after Jón Páll Sigmarsson and Magnús Ver Magnússon. During heats and the finals, he broke world records in the keg drop squat, car deadlift and 363 kg (800 lb) Basque circle.

Hafþór won the inaugural World's Ultimate Strongman, held in Dubai, in a stacked field of twelve athletes with a 520 kg (1,146 lb) silver dollar deadlift, and dominant performances throughout the competition, taking his international title tally to 27. At the national circuit, he won his eighth straight Iceland's Strongest Man, and broke the Weight over bar world record for the ninth and tenth times.

Also from 2018 onwards, Hafþór significantly increased his static strength under the mentoring of his strength coach since 2016, Sebastian Oreb, strict pressed 200 kg (441 lb), and increased his squat to 445 kg (981 lb) during training and 460 kg (1,014 lb) during Thor's Powerlifting Challenge. The latter squat was controversially red lighted due to depth, but even with his 2nd attempt squat of 440 kg (970 lb), Hafþór equaled Bill Kazmaier's 1,100 kg (2,425 lb) classic powerlifting total, doing it raw.

=== 2019 ===
Hafþór successfully defended his title at the 2019 Arnold Strongman Classic in dominant fashion and broke his own elephant bar deadlift world record, increasing the heaviest raw deadlift in strongman history to 474.5 kg (1,046 lb) in only his second attempt out of the three allowed and broke the Weight over bar world record for the eleventh time.

He also dominated 2019 Europe's Strongest Man with only requiring to load three of the five Atlas stones in the last event, becoming a five-time Europe's Strongest Man Champion. After winning the axle deadlift for reps Hafþór famously answered Bill Kazmaier, "What is this, I didn't know I was gonna come here and do cardio!" and held the 200 kg (441 lb) each, Pillars of Hercules for 55.13 seconds.

In his attempt to defend his World's Strongest Man title, Hafþór tore his plantar fascia during the group stages and ended up being third, behind Martins Licis and Mateusz Kieliszkowski, thus achieving the longest continuous podium streak in World's Strongest Man history, with eight (2012–2019). Hafþór won more vehicle pulls, stone events, and medleys and loading races than any other competitor in the history of the competition. Among the past winners who have managed to qualify for the finals at a 100% ratio, Hafþór and Mariusz Pudzianowski top the list, with nine finals out of nine appearances.

In the national circuit, he won his ninth consecutive Iceland's Strongest Man, defending the title also against foreign athletes Tom Stoltman and Luke Stoltman, thus beating the record of Magnús Ver Magnússon's eight ISM titles. In this competition, he loaded five natural stones weighing 137–212 kg (302–467 lb) in 50.42 seconds for another world record and also extended his Húsafell Stone all-time world record. He also upscaled and relocated 'Thor's Power Gym' to its current location at Dalvegur, Kópavogur.

=== 2020 ===
During his Arnold prep in February 2020, Hafþór deadlifted 455 kg (1,003 lb) for two repetitions and became the first person in history to deadlift 1,000 lbs+ for two reps. Two weeks later, he deadlifted 480 kg (1,058 lb) for an unofficial world record on the elephant bar, also making it the heaviest raw deadlift of all-time. During this prep, Hafþór also incline pressed 100 kg (220 lb) dumbbells for 7 repetitions, one arm overhead pressed a 146 kg (322 lb) Cyr dumbbell, overhead pressed a 155 kg (342 lb) natural stone, and lifted the Thomas Inch dumbbell.

After successfully defending his crown again in 2020, Hafþór became only the second man in history to win the Arnold Strongman Classic three times in a row, after Žydrūnas Savickas. He pressed both a 136 kg (300 lb) Inver stone and Cyr dumbbell overhead and deadlifted 465.5 kg (1,026 lb) raw for a comfortable win. This win took his international title tally to 30.

Following a 7 week prep, Hafþór deadlifted 501 kg (1,105 lb) at 'Thor's Power Gym' in Kópavogur, Iceland, while being refereed by Magnús Ver Magnússon under the sanctioning of World's Ultimate Strongman, and broke the all-time deadlift world record of 500 kg (1,102 lb) held by Eddie Hall for the past 3 years and 9 months. The lift was globally televised live by ESPN, and the Guinness World Records verified it as 'the heaviest deadlift of all-time'.

After winning Iceland's Strongest Man for the tenth consecutive time, Hafþór retired from Strongman for a brief period of time to pursue his boxing journey.

=== 2021–2023 ===
In 2022, a significantly downsized Hafþór made a guest appearance at the Rogue Invitational in Austin, Texas, and broke the weight over bar world record for the twelfth time, with a clearance of 6.17 metres (20 ft 3 in). The following year, and still downsized, he casually lifted 109 kg (240 lb) in the IronMind Rolling thunder while visiting Glenolden, Pennsylvania for a promotional event.

=== 2024 ===
Following a three-year hiatus due to boxing and powerlifting, Hafþór returned to the 2024 Arnold Strongman Classic and effortlessly deadlifted 456.5 kg (1,006 lb) to win the inaugural event. Since he was still recovering from a major pectoral tear from the previous year, his pressing power was only adequate for the overall fourth place. Two weeks later, Hafþór secured second place at the Arnold UK, after breaking the world record for the raw deadlift for reps event, performing ten repetitions with 350 kg (772 lb) on a stiff bar within sixty seconds.

Hafþór debuted at the 2024 Strongest Man on Earth competition at Shaw Classic expo and finished runner-up with five event wins from eight to Mitchell Hooper. He broke world records in 15 kg (33 lb) keg toss with 7.77 metres (25 ft 6 in), and Manhood stone (Max Atlas stone), hoisting a 250 kg (551 lb) stone over a 4 ft (48 in) bar for 2 repetitions. During the prep for the competition, he squatted 380 kg (838 lb) raw for 5 paused repetitions and loaded a 260 kg (573 lb) Manhood stone.

He also returned to the Strongman Champions League, winning 2024 SCL Dubai and emerged joint-second at 2024 Rogue Invitational with a world record in Inver stones, one-motioning the 5 stones weighing 125–191 kg (275–420 lb) onto Whiskey barrels in 27.34 seconds. Hafþór also won his eleventh Iceland's Strongest Man title.

At SC24 conference in Atlanta, Georgia organized by VDURA, Hafþór deadlifted 282.6 petabytes of data, for the world record of highest amount of data lifted by a human.

=== 2025 ===
At the 2025 Arnold Strongman Classic, Hafþór finished third, securing his fifth podium finish at the competition. He deadlifted 465.5 kg (1,026 lb) raw on the elephant bar and behind the neck push pressed 232.5 kg (513 lb) becoming the only man in history to deadlift 1,000 lb+ and shoulder press 500 lb+ within the same competition.

He also came second place at 2025 Siberian Power Show in Russia behind Kieliszkowski and won Iceland's Strongest Man for the twelfth time, including the fastest one-motioned 5 set Atlas stone run in history in 15.95 seconds for another world record.

At 2025 Eisenhart Black Deadlift Championships held in Bavaria, Germany, Hafþór deadlifted 505 kg (1,113 lb) and broke his own all-time world record deadlift. The lift, which was followed by Hafþór screaming "I'm the fucking strongest!", was performed in suboptimal conditions, amidst rainy outdoors on a faulty carpet platform at 1:00 am, requiring a mid-comp technique change. Due to these adversities, numerous critiques recognized it as the greatest lift ever and it made Hafþór the first and only man in history to deadlift more than 500 kg, twice.

Six weeks later at 2025 World Deadlift Championships held in Birmingham, England, he broke the all-time world record deadlift yet again, this time by speed repping 510 kg (1,124 lb). Hafþór then went on to win the entire Giants Live World Open competition on the same day, dominating over a stacked lineup, eventually making him the greatest Giants Live champion of all time with ten wins. Many experts, fellow athletes and fans widely consider it to be the single greatest lift and performance of all-time and it also made Hafþór the first and only man in history to deadlift more than 500 kg, thrice.

=== 2026 ===
At the 2026 Swaglift Day held in Czech Republic, in a fatigued state just six days after attempting the heaviest deadlift ever at the Enhanced Games, deadlifted 400 kg (882 lb) for seven reps under one minute, breaking the deadlift for reps world record in Strongman.

While enjoying a family holiday, he made a guest appearance at 2026 Sherwood Park Highland gathering festival in Edmonton, Canada and broke the weight over bar world record for the thirteenth time, with a clearance of 6.20 metres (20 ft 4 in).

== Competitive record ==
=== Strongman ===
Placements: 61 x 1st places, 17 x 2nd places and 11 x 3rd places = 89 x podium finishes from 106 total competitions.

- Winning percentage: 45.2% at International circuit & 82.4% at National circuit
- Podium percentage: 76.7% at International circuit & 97.1% at National circuit
- Top 5 percentage: 93.1% at International circuit & 100% at National circuit

	1st	2nd	3rd	Podium	4th	5th	Top 5	6th	7th	8th	9th	10th	Total
International	33	15	8	56	5	7	68	1	2	1		1	73
National	28	2	3	33	1		34						34
Combined	61	17	11	89	6	7	102	1	2	1		1	107

=== Powerlifting ===
Despite the fact that Hafþór never trained specifically for powerlifting, he did two full competitions during his strongman career and another post-retirement. In the 2011 Íslandsmót tournament, at the age of 22, he totaled 930 kg (2,050 lb) raw, winning second place overall, behind Páll Logason. During the 2018 Thor's Powerlifting Challenge (sanctioned by the 'World Raw Powerlifting Federation'), with only five weeks of casual preparation, Hafþór totaled 1,100 kg (2,425 lb) raw, which was at the time the fifth-highest raw superheavyweight powerlifting total of all time. He won second place for highest bench press, behind Kirill Sarychev, and won first place for the highest squat, highest deadlift, highest total, and highest Wilks score, winning the overall competition.

After a two-and-a-half-year hiatus from strength training, Hafþór competed in 2022 Thor's Powerlifting Meet in December and totaled 970 kg (2,138 lb) raw. Then on 13 February 2023, Hafþór proceeded to officially announce his return to strength sports, stating he will attempt to break the all-time powerlifting total world record at the end of the year. On 15 April 2023, he competed in his first out of three scheduled powerlifting meets, on his journey towards breaking the world record, and squatted 420 kg (926 lb), but tore his left pectoral muscle on his last bench press attempt of 252.5 kg (557 lb), forcing him to withdraw from performing the deadlifts. A week later, he underwent a five-hour surgery in Los Angeles, where the muscle was successfully re-attached to the bone, promising a full recovery.

=== Highland Games ===
Hafþór participated in the 2011, 2012 and 2017 Icelandic Highland Games; the 150th anniversary of the Caledonian Club of San Francisco's 2015 Highland Games also followed by 2016 edition; and was a guest participant at the New Hampshire Highland Games (also known as Loon Mountain Highland Games) in 2014, 2015, and 2017. During these competitions, he broke multiple world records in deadlift, stone carry, stone press, keg toss, and weight over bar events.

== Personal records ==
- Deadlift on standard bar (equipped with straps) – 510 kg (1,124 lb), 460 kg (1,014 lb) x 2 reps, 440 kg (970 lb) x 3 reps
- Deadlift on elephant bar (raw with straps) – 480 kg (1,058 lb), 455 kg (1,003 lb) x 2 reps
- Deadlift for reps (equipped with straps) – 400 kg (882 lb) x 7 reps
- Deadlift on stiff bar for reps (raw with straps) – 350 kg (772 lb) x 10 reps
- Squat (raw with wraps) – 460 kg (1,014 lb), 400 kg (882 lb) x 2 reps
- Squat for reps (raw with wraps) – 380 kg (838 lb) x 5 reps (paused), 325 kg (717 lb) x 8 reps (paused), 200 kg (441 lb) x 29 reps
- Bench press (raw) – 250 kg (551 lb), 220 kg (485 lb) x 6 reps, 200 kg (441 lb) x 10 reps
- Incline dumbbell press – 100 kg (220 lb) dumbbells per hand x 7 reps, 80 kg (176 lb) dumbbells per hand x 12 reps
- Log press – 213 kg (470 lb), 195 kg (430 lb) x 3 reps
- Axle press – 206 kg (454 lb), 181.5 kg (400 lb) x 4 reps
- Barbell push press (behind the neck) – 232.5 kg (513 lb)
- Cyr dumbbell press – 146 kg (322 lb), 129 kg (284 lb) x 3 reps
- Manhood Stone (Max Atlas Stone) over 4 ft bar – 260 kg (573 lb), 250 kg (551 lb) x 2 reps
- Atlas Stones (5 stones) – 120–200 kg (265–441 lb) in 17.54 seconds, 130–190 kg (287–419 lb) in 15.95 seconds
- Inver Stones (5 stones) – 125–191 kg (276–421 lb) in 27.34 seconds
- Húsafell Stone – 186 kg (410 lb) for 98.16 metres (322 ft 1 in)
- Bale tote (super yoke) – 710 kg (1,565 lb) for 4 metres in 28.65 seconds
- Timber carry (on 35' inclined ramp) – 500 kg (1,102 lb) in 10.15 seconds (with straps), 400 kg (882 lb) in 8.40 seconds (Raw grip)
- Keg toss – 12.5 kg (28 lb) over 8.54 metres (28 ft 0 in), 15 kg (33 lb) over 7.77 metres (25 ft 6 in)
- Keg toss run – 8 kegs (18–25 kg (40–55 lb)) over 4.90 metres (16 ft 1 in) in 16.35 seconds
- Weight over bar – 25.5 kg (56 lb) over 6.20 metres (20 ft 4 in)
- Sandbag over bar – 45.4 kg (100 lb) over 4.57 metres (15 ft 0 in)
- Viking ship mast (Ormrinn langi) carry – 650 kg (1,433 lb), 10 metres (33 ft) long log for 5 steps
- Plane pull – 40,000 kg (88,185 lb) for 24.90 meters 'uphill, with an extra uphill on the final meter'

=== Legacy ===
During his international strongman career, Hafþór won all the major strongman competitions and titles that were available at that time, including World's Strongest Man, Arnold Strongman Classic, Europe's Strongest Man, Strongman Champions League, Giants Live, and World's Ultimate Strongman, and his thirty two international wins rank him as the third most decorated strongman of all time. Even though he was noted primarily for his strength in the moving events during the initial years of his career (for example, medleys and loading races, keg-tossing, power stairs, vehicle pulls, and natural stones, which require good stamina and athleticism), Hafþór kept on improving and upscaled his brute strength, which helped him excel in static events, such as deadlifts, squats, log presses, axle presses, circus dumbbells, etc. This made him a well-rounded strongman by the year 2018. Experts consider the three years from that point onwards as the "highest peak performance" of any strongman in history, due to Hafþór's dominance and having no weaknesses at any event. During these three years, the only time Hafþór failed to win a competition was due to an injury, and apart from it, he remained unbeaten. Hafþór's international accolades and winning everything there is in the sport cemented his legacy as one of the greatest strongmen of all time, and due to breaking 129 world records in various static lifts and feats displaying brute strength, many analysts and strongman experts regard him as "the strongest man to have ever walked the earth".

== Boxing career ==
Hafþór Júlíus Björnsson
Personal information
- Height: 205 cm (6 ft 9 in)
- Weight: 144–152 kg (317–335 lb) (Note: This is Hafþór's body weight during his boxing career. For Strongman and Basketball body weights, please refer to the respective sections.)

Sport
- Sport: Boxing
- Weight class: Titanweight

On 2 May 2020, after breaking the Deadlift World Record, Hafþór challenged its previous record holder, Eddie Hall, to a boxing match. Despite having no boxing experience whatsoever, Hafþór learned the fundamentals of the sport and made commendable progress under the guidance of his coaches, Billy Nelson and Vilhjálmur Hernandez, and support from his two main sparring partners, Skúli Ármansson and Bill Hodgson. With a stricter diet that differed from his strongman days, Hafþór also transformed himself to suit the new sport, losing 64 kg (141 lb) in the process. He started training twice a day (up to five hours per day), with a weekly routine that was segmented into fourteen sessions. They consisted of six boxing training sessions, four strength training sessions (two each for upper and lower body), and four endurance training sessions.

Hafþór's first exhibition match was against ex-WBO European light-heavyweight champion Steven Ward, in January 2021. For his second exhibition match, he faced the 2010 Commonwealth Games Heavyweight Gold Medalist, Simon Vallily, in May 2021. The two fights provided him his first real ring experience. On 18 September 2021, Hafþór faced Canadian professional arm-wrestler Devon Larratt, who volunteered for the fight when Eddie Hall withdrew, after sustaining a biceps tear during training. Within the first round, the referee was forced to stop the fight, awarding Hafþór the win via TKO (technical knockout).

=== The Mountain vs. The Beast ===
On 19 March 2022, after almost two years since its announcement, Hafþór and Hall finally faced each other in Dubai in a fight taglined The Heaviest Boxing Match in History. Hall started the first round with continuous haymakers, but Hafþór kept his composure and stuck to the basics, focusing on a solid jab and better footwork. Once he realized Hall's game plan, Hafþór took control of the fight by bludgeoning and knocking Hall down twice, in rounds three and six. Hall sustained bleeding lacerations on top of both eyes, and Hafþór won the fight via unanimous decision.

=== Boxing record ===
4 fights	2 wins	0 losses
By knockout	1	0
By decision	1	0
Draws	2	

No.	Result	Record	Opponent	Type	Round, time	Date	Location	Notes
4	Win	2–0–2	Eddie Hall	UD	6	19 Mar 2022	Aviation Club Tennis Centre, Dubai, U.A.E.	
3	Win	1–0–2	Devon Larratt	TKO	1 (6), 2:00	18 Sep 2021	Sports Society, Dubai, U.A.E.	
2	Draw	0–0–2	Simon Vallily	D	4	28 May 2021	Conrad Hotel, Dubai, U.A.E.	
1	Draw	0–0–1	Steven Ward	D	3	16 Jan 2021	Conrad Hotel, Dubai, U.A.E.	

== Acting career ==
Hafþór was cast as Ser Gregor "The Mountain" Clegane for the fourth season of the HBO series Game of Thrones in August 2013. This was his first main acting role, and he is the third person to depict the character after Conan Stevens played the role in season 1 and Ian Whyte in season 2, but the first actor to portray Clegane in more than one continuous season, with his appearances in seasons four through eight. He was also cast for the lead role in the Philadelphia Renaissance Faire during their debut season, in 2015. He appeared as 'King Thor', the leader of a Viking raiding party intent on capturing the city of Amman.

In 2018, Hafþór played Mongkut, the main villain in Kickboxer: Retaliation, opposite Alain Moussi and Jean-Claude Van Damme, in a story about a kickboxer (Moussi) who is sedated and taken to a prison in Bangkok, where he is forced to fight a giant for freedom and a large sum of money. In the same year, he also played Big John in the film Operation Ragnarok, about a town in the south of Sweden isolated after a viral outbreak and the trapped Swedes and immigrants uniting to survive an onslaught.

The next year, he starred with Mike Tyson and Amr Saad in the action film Pharaoh's War, about a former soldier (Tyson) with a mysterious past leading a group of Egyptian refugees through the desert to protect them from a group of evil mercenaries.

In 2022, Hafþór had a minor role as Thorfinnr the Tooth-Gnasher in the historical epic fantasy The Northman, which starred Alexander Skarsgård, Nicole Kidman, Ethan Hawke, Claes Bang, Anya Taylor-Joy, and Willem Dafoe.

=== Film ===
List of film appearances, with year, title, and role shown
Year	Title	Role	Notes
2015	Eddie: Strongman	Himself	
2017	Devilish Deeds	Psycho Phil Bell	
2018	Kickboxer: Retaliation	Mongkut	
2018	Operation Ragnarok	Big John	
2019	Hamlet Pheroun	Frank	Egyptian film; supporting role
2022	The Northman	Thorfinnr	
2026	Masters of the Universe	Goat Man	

=== Television ===
List of television appearances, with year, title, and role shown
Duration	Title	Role	Notes
2014–2019	Game of Thrones	Gregor "The Mountain" Clegane	Recurring role
2015	A League of Their Own	Himself	Series 9, Episode 7
2017	Born Strong	Himself	Documentary film
2018	Keith Lemon: Coming to America	Himself	Series 1, Episode 6

== Other ventures ==
=== Martial arts ===
Since beginning with boxing, Hafþór has stayed involved in a range of martial arts. In 2020, he appeared on episode ten of Karate Combat, with Bas Rutten and Brazilian jiu-jitsu black belt Josh Palmer, prior to having a training session with Palmer that was released to the public. He then visited Mjolnir MMA to train with UFC veteran Gunnar Nelson in May 2021 and was filmed grappling with the professional fighter. In December 2022, Hafþór met Gordon Ryan prior to his match with Nicky Rodriguez at UFC FightPass Invitational 3 and was filmed having a sparring match with him.

== Personal life ==
=== Family and relationships ===
Hafþór has been accused by several ex-girlfriends of domestic violence, including Thelma Björk Steimann (the mother of one of his children). Björk stated in an interview that Hafþór beat and raped her over the course of their two-year relationship, which began when she was 17 and Hafþór was 18. She pressed charges, but the police investigation found no grounds for action, and Hafþór threatened to sue Björk for slander.

In late 2017, Hafþór began dating Canadian fitness model Kelsey Morgan Henson, whom he met in Alberta during a promotional event for Icelandic Mountain Vodka and touring for the Warwick Strongman Festival. The couple garnered media attention because of their height difference. They married in August 2018, and on 26 September 2020, welcomed a son.

On 10 November 2023, the couple announced on Instagram that they had lost a baby girl at 21 weeks of gestation.

=== Nutrition ===
During his Strongman days, Hafþór had to constantly force-feed himself to maintain his size and strength. He used to consume up to 8,000 calories a day during 2012–2017 to maintain a 180–190 kg (400–420 lb) physique and increased it up to 10,000 calories a day in his prime (2018–2020) to maintain a 200–202 kg (441–445 lb) body. As a general rule, his macro balance was 2:2:1 carbs-to-protein-to-fat ratio. A typical breakfast could consist of eggs, bacon, and French toast while a typical lunch may consist of rice, steak (or ground bison or salmon), potatoes, spinach, carrots, and chicken stock. He had six to eight healthy meals a day, with the occasional exception: "one cheat meal once in a while is fine as long as you stay on track the rest of the time".

From mid-2020, Hafþór reduced his caloric intake to around 5,000 calories a day, with a much stricter diet that helped him with his body transformation, to suit boxing.

=== Health concerns ===
Hafþór has had occasional sleep troubles in the past after heavy meals, due to his large body weight.

In March 2017, he was diagnosed with Bell's palsy, which paralysed half of his face. He recovered later that year, though he still has a slight facial droop on the right side.

In an interview, when asked if he had ever used steroids, Hafþór answered: "Yes, I have. When you want to be the best, you do whatever it takes". He did not provide further information related to the cycles or whether his use of the substances was ongoing. He has never failed a drug test during his entire career.

In April 2023, during the bench press event at a summer powerlifting meet at his gym, Hafþór sustained a major injury, tearing his left pectoralis major muscle off the humerus bone.

=== Endorsements ===
In 2016, Hafþór co-founded the spirits brand Icelandic Mountain Vodka, which is a seven-time distilled Icelandic vodka. The company also produces gin.

Together with Unnar Helgi Danielsson, Dylan Sprouse, and Terry Crews, Hafþór is also a co-founder and brand ambassador of Thor's Skyr, a traditional Icelandic high-protein cultured dairy product high in probiotics and low in sugar.

Hafþór also owns 'Thor's Power Apparel', a family business retailing branded merchandise via an online shop, and is also a brand ambassador for SodaStream.
