= Billy Nelson (boxer) =

Scottish Boxer

Personal information
- Nationality: Scottish (Scotland)
- Born: Glasgow, Scotland
- Occupation: Boxing Coach

Billy Nelson is a Scottish Boxing coach and a former boxer.

He was the trainer and coach of strongman Hafþór Júlíus Björnsson for his Titan-weight match in March, 2022 which Björnsson defeated Eddie Hall.

Nelson has also coached WBA super-featherweight, lightweight and light-welterweight champion Ricky Burns; Commonwealth super-middleweight champion David Brophy, lightweight and super-lightweight champion Willie Limond and featherweight champion John Simpson; British featherweight champion Paul Appleby and lightweight Lewis Ritson, IBF European cruiserweight champion Stephen Simmons and Congolese heavyweight Martin Bakole.
