= Grundaskóli =

School in Akranes, Iceland

Grundaskoli
- Grundaskóli

Location
- Espigrund 1, 300 Akranes; Akranes; Iceland; 64.318677°N 22.05465°W

Information
- Type: Public compulsory school
- Established: 1982
- Grades: 1–10
- Enrollment: ~ 700 as of 2026
- Classes: 31
- Language: Icelandic
- Website: grundaskoli.is

Grundaskóli is one of two schools in the port town of Akranes, on the west coast of Iceland, established in 1981. The other school is Brekkubæjarskóli.
