= Orm Storolfsson =

Icelandic strongman

Orm Stórolfsson, also known as Orm Stórolfsson the Strong (fl. 920–1005 CE), was an Icelandic viking who gained considerable attention during his lifetime for extraordinary feats of strength.

Vormsi island (Swedish: Ormsö – "Orm's Island") in Estonia is possibly named after him.

== Ormrinn langi ship mast carry ==
Orm is documented in one of the Icelandic saga's to have walked three steps with the mast of Ormrinn langi on his shoulders before breaking his back and injuring himself.

According to the legend, Orm and Earl of Eiríkur were feasting in Víkin, Norway. On their way, they arrived at a place where a large tree was cut down to craft the mast of a viking longship called the 'Ormrinn langi'. (Note: Ormrinn langi in Old Norse literally translates to 'the long serpent' in English. Weight or dimensions of Ormrinn langi's mast is not mentioned in the saga or any historical document. Strongman Champions League directors Marcel Mostert and Ilkka Kinnunen researched on what would have been the size of it based on medieval longships and deduced a length of 10 metres (33 ft) and a weight of 650 kg (1,433 lb) as its upper-bound limit.) The Earl who wanted to see how many men it would require to carry the mast, ordered 60 men including Orm to go under and hold it on their shoulders. While Orm remained in the centre, all other men were withdrawn until Orm held it all by himself as he walked three steps with it. It is said that he was never the same again after this feat, and spent a few winters with the Earl in Norway before returning back to Stórólfshvól in Iceland.

=== 1,000 year old record ===
In 2015, the feat which remained unmatched for over 1,000 years, was beaten by fellow Icelander Hafthór Júlíus Björnsson at the World's Strongest Viking competition in Vinstra, Norway. Hafthór carried a 10 metres (33 ft) long, 1.42 metres (4 ft 8 in) in circumference (or 0.45 metres (1 ft 6 in) in diameter) ship mast which weighed 650 kg (1,433 lb) for five steps in freezing cold weather and famously yelled "History!" after being elated with his record breaking performance.
In 2019, as a part of the History Channel television series The Strongest Man in History, Brian Shaw, Eddie Hall, Robert Oberst and Nick Best attempted to lift a 657.5 kg (1,450 lb) ship mast. Neither Shaw, Hall nor Oberst managed to budge it while Nick Best managed to momentarily hold it for half a second but failed to move it even for a single step.
