= Loading race =

Strongman event

A loading race or medley is an event in World's Strongest Man and other similar strongman competitions which requires competitors to carry, drag and load several heavy and irregular objects onto a platform over a course usually ranging from 10 to 30 meters. The competitor to move and load all objects in the fastest time is the winner.

== Implements ==
Some of the frequently used objects for the events are anchors and chains, anvils, sandbags, sacks, safes, beer kegs, wine barrels and natural stones. They usually weigh between 100 kg (220 lb) to 150 kg (331 lb) but occasionally can be heavier than that.

== Physical demands ==
Contrary to popular belief, the weight of the objects is not the defining factor in these events. The overall shape of the objects, their dimensions, and the terrain (which can range from rubble to sand to snow) makes these events challenging and requires physical strength, athleticism and speed equally and also different skills are required for different irregular objects.

== Notable Strongmen ==
- Below table summarizes the most successful loading medley winners in international Strongman competitions.
- No. of total career loading medley's against the no. of wins (entry criteria: a minimum of 5 wins and a >10% winning ratio, open category).
- With 15 total wins at over 2 wins per every 3 loading medleys he undertook, Iceland's Hafþór Júlíus Björnsson is the greatest loading medley winner in strongman history.

#	Name	Nationality	Events	Wins	Win %
1	Hafþór Júlíus Björnsson	Iceland	22	15	68.18%
2	Tom Stoltman	Scotland	11	8	72.72%
3	JF Caron	Canada	22	8	36.36%
4	Vytautas Lalas	Lithuania	8	6	75.00%
5	Pavlo Kordiyaka	Ukraine	10	6	60.00%
6	Aivars Šmaukstelis	Latvia	26	6	23.08%
7	Žydrūnas Savickas	Lithuania	27	6	22.22%
8	Dainis Zageris	Latvia	32	6	18.75%
9	Mike Burke	United States	8	5	62.50%
10	Matjaz Belsak	Slovenia	13	5	38.5%

- As at 1 July 2025
