= Competitive strongman record of Hafþór Júlíus Björnsson =

As a competitive strongman, Iceland's Hafþór Júlíus Björnsson won 63 national and international competitions out of a total of 109. 61 of them were as an individual competitor while the remaining two as a team competitor in World's Strongest Team competition. He also reached the podium 90 times (88 times individually), and secured a top 5 finish 104 times (101 times individually).

Following his debut at 2009 Westfjord's Viking competition where he secured 4th place, he made the podium in every national-level competition for the rest of his career, winning 28 out of 33 national competitions. At the international circuit, he competed in 73 competitions across multiple strength federations, earning 56 podium finishes and 33 wins, making him the 3rd most decorated strongman of all-time.

This list is a chronological compilation of Hafþór's competition results from 2009 to present.

== Individual ==
| # | Competition | Circuit | Result | Win tally | International title tally | Venue |
|---|---|---|---|---|---|---|
| 1 | 2009 Westfjord's Viking | National | 4th | | | Iceland |
| 2 | 2009 Grundarfjord Viking | National | 3rd | | | Iceland |
| 3 | 2009 Highland Viking | National | 3rd | | | Iceland |
| 4 | 2009 Eastfjord Strongman Championships | National | 2nd | | | Iceland |
| 5 | 2010 Westfjord's Viking | National | 1st | 1 | | Iceland |
| 6 | 2010 Eastfjord Strongman Championships | National | 1st | 2 | | Iceland |
| 7 | 2010 Highland Viking | National | 1st | 3 | | Iceland |
| 8 | 2010 Iceland's Strongest Man | National | 3rd | | | Mosfellsbær, Iceland |
| 9 | 2010 Iceland's Strongest Viking | National | 1st | 4 | | Iceland |
| 10 | 2010 OK Budar Strongman Championships | National | 1st | 5 | | Iceland |
| 11 | 2010 Strongest Man in Iceland | National | 1st | 6 | | Iceland |
| 12 | 2010 Jón Páll Sigmarsson Classic | International | 2nd | | | Reykjavík, Iceland |
| 13 | 2011 Akranes Strength Challenge | National | 1st | 7 | | Iceland |
| 14 | 2011 Iceland's Strongest Man | National | 1st | 8 | | Mosfellsbær, Iceland |
| 15 | 2011 Arnold Amateur Strongman World Championships | International | 2nd | | | (United States) Columbus, Ohio |
| 16 | 2011 Giants Live Poland | International | 4th | | | Stróże, Poland |
| 17 | 2011 Iceland's Strongest Viking | National | 1st | 9 | | Iceland |
| 18 | 2011 World's Strongest Man | International | 6th | | | (United States) Wingate, North Carolina |
| 19 | 2011 Strongman Champions League Canada | International | 5th | | | New Brunswick, Canada |
| 20 | 2011 Jón Páll Sigmarsson Classic | International | 4th | | | Reykjavík, Iceland |
| 21 | 2011 Strongest Man in Iceland | National | 1st | 10 | | Iceland |
| 22 | 2011 Westfjord's Viking | National | 1st | 11 | | Iceland |
| 23 | 2012 Arnold Strongman Classic | International | 10th | | | (United States) Columbus, Ohio |
| 24 | 2012 King of the Castle | International | 1st | 12 | 1 | Hämeenlinna, Finland |
| 25 | 2012 Iceland's Strongest Man | National | 1st | 13 | | Mosfellsbær, Iceland |
| 26 | 2012 Iceland's Strongest Viking | National | 1st | 14 | | Iceland |
| 27 | 2012 Jón Páll Sigmarsson Classic | International | 1st | 15 | 2 | Reykjavík, Iceland |
| 28 | 2012 Europe's Strongest Man | International | 5th | | | Leeds, England |
| 29 | 2012 Eastfjord Strongman Championships | National | 1st | 16 | | Iceland |
| 30 | 2012 Strongest Man in Iceland | National | 1st | 17 | | Iceland |
| 31 | 2012 World's Strongest Man | International | 3rd | | | (United States) Los Angeles, California |
| 32 | 2012 Westfjord's Viking | National | 1st | 18 | | Iceland |
| 33 | 2012 Arnold Pro Strongman World Series Europe | International | 7th | | | Madrid, Spain |
| 34 | 2013 Arnold Strongman Classic | International | 8th | | | (United States) Columbus, Ohio |
| 35 | 2013 Strongman Champions League FIBO | International | 2nd | | | Cologne, Germany |
| 36 | 2013 Força Bruta (Arnold Pro Strongman World Series South America) | International | 2nd | | | Rio de Janeiro, Brazil |
| 37 | 2013 Strongman Champions League Latvia | International | 1st | 19 | 3 | Olaine, Latvia |
| 38 | 2013 Iceland's Strongest Man | National | 1st | 20 | | Mosfellsbær, Iceland |
| 39 | 2013 Strongman Champions League Holland | International | 2nd | | | Kalkar, Germany |
| 40 | 2013 Europe's Strongest Man | International | 4th | | | Leeds, England |
| 41 | 2013 Strongman Champions League China | International | 2nd | | | Zhengzhou, China |
| 42 | 2013 Strongman Champions League World Truck Pull Championships | International | 5th | | | Alahärmä, Finland |
| 43 | 2013 World's Strongest Man | International | 3rd | | | Sanya, China |
| 44 | 2013 Strongman Champions League Russia | International | 3rd | | | Vladivostok, Russia |
| 45 | 2013 Strongman Champions League Savickas Classic | International | 5th | | | Vilnius, Lithuania |
| 46 | 2013 Strongman Champions League Brazil | International | 3rd | | | São Paulo, Brazil |
| 47 | 2013 Strongman Champions League World Finals | International | 5th | | | Kuala Lumpur, Malaysia |
| 48 | 2014 Arnold Strongman Classic | International | 5th | | | (United States) Columbus, Ohio |
| 49 | 2014 Giants Live FitX Australia | International | 1st | 21 | 4 | Melbourne, Australia |
| 50 | 2014 World's Strongest Man | International | 2nd | | | (United States) Los Angeles, California |
| 51 | 2014 World's Strongest Viking (Giants Live Norway) | International | 1st | 22 | 5 | Vinstra, Norway |
| 52 | 2014 Força Bruta (Arnold Pro Strongman World Series South America) | International | 3rd | | | Rio de Janeiro, Brazil |
| 53 | 2014 Battle of the North | International | 1st | 23 | 6 | Tórshavn, Faroe Islands |
| 54 | 2014 Strongman Champions League Serbia | International | 1st | 24 | 7 | Novi Sad, Serbia |
| 55 | 2014 Strongman Champions League Finland | International | 1st | 25 | 8 | Vaasa, Finland |
| 56 | 2014 Iceland's Strongest Man | National | 1st | 26 | | Mosfellsbær, Iceland |
| 57 | 2014 Strongman Champions League Holland | International | 1st | 27 | 9 | Doetinchem, Netherlands |
| 58 | 2014 Europe's Strongest Man | International | 1st | 28 | 10 | Leeds, England |
| 59 | 2014 Strongman Champions League World Finals | International | 1st | 29 | 11 | Kuala Lumpur, Malaysia |
| 60 | 2015 World's Strongest Viking (Strongman Champions League Norway) | International | 1st | 30 | 12 | Vinstra, Norway |
| 61 | 2015 Arnold Strongman Classic | International | 7th | | | (United States) Columbus, Ohio |
| 62 | 2015 World's Strongest Man | International | 3rd | | | Putrajaya, Malaysia |
| 63 | 2015 Giants Live Iceland (Viking Challenge) | International | 1st | 31 | 13 | Grindavík, Iceland |
| 64 | 2015 Strongman Champions League Finland | International | 4th | | | Merikarvia, Finland |
| 65 | 2015 Iceland's Strongest Man | National | 1st | 32 | | Mosfellsbær, Iceland |
| 66 | 2015 Strongman Champions League Bulgaria | International | 1st | 33 | 14 | Plovdiv, Bulgaria |
| 67 | 2015 Europe's Strongest Man | International | 1st | 34 | 15 | Leeds, England |
| 68 | 2015 Strongman Champions League Croatia | International | 1st | 35 | 16 | Split, Croatia |
| 69 | 2015 Giants Live Sweden (Scandinavian Open) | International | 1st | 36 | 17 | Norrköping, Sweden |
| 70 | 2016 Arnold Strongman Classic | International | 5th | | | (United States) Columbus, Ohio |
| 71 | 2016 Arnold Pro Strongman World Series Australia | International | 1st | 37 | 18 | Melbourne, Australia |
| 72 | 2016 Arnold Pro Strongman World Series South America | International | 1st | 38 | 19 | São Paulo, Brazil |
| 73 | 2016 Arnold Pro Strongman World Series Africa | International | 1st | 39 | 20 | Sandton, South Africa |
| 74 | 2016 Iceland's Strongest Man | National | 1st | 40 | | Mosfellsbær, Iceland |
| 75 | 2016 Strongest Man in Iceland | National | 1st | 41 | | Iceland |
| 76 | 2016 Europe's Strongest Man | International | 2nd | | | Leeds, England |
| 77 | 2016 World's Strongest Man | International | 2nd | | | Kasane, Botswana |
| 78 | 2017 Arnold Strongman Classic | International | 2nd | | | (United States) Columbus, Ohio |
| 79 | 2017 Europe's Strongest Man | International | 1st | 42 | 21 | Leeds, England |
| 80 | 2017 World's Strongest Man | International | 2nd | | | Gaborone, Botswana |
| 81 | 2017 Iceland's Strongest Man | National | 1st | 43 | | Mosfellsbær, Iceland |
| 82 | 2017 Strongest Man in Iceland | National | 1st | 44 | | Iceland |
| 83 | 2017 Festival des Hommes Forts de Warwick | International | 1st | 45 | 22 | Warwick, Canada |
| 84 | 2017 WoW Stronger | International | 1st | 46 | 23 | Russia |
| 85 | 2018 Arnold Strongman Classic | International | 1st | 47 | 24 | (United States) Columbus, Ohio |
| 86 | 2018 Europe's Strongest Man | International | 1st | 48 | 25 | Leeds, England |
| 87 | 2018 World's Strongest Man | International | 1st | 49 | 26 | Manila, Philippines |
| 88 | 2018 Iceland's Strongest Man | National | 1st | 50 | | Mosfellsbær, Iceland |
| 89 | 2018 World's Ultimate Strongman | International | 1st | 51 | 27 | (United Arab Emirates) Dubai, UAE |
| 90 | 2019 Arnold Strongman Classic | International | 1st | 52 | 28 | (United States) Columbus, Ohio |
| 91 | 2019 Europe's Strongest Man | International | 1st | 53 | 29 | Leeds, England |
| 92 | 2019 World's Strongest Man | International | 3rd | | | (United States) Bradenton, Florida |
| 93 | 2019 Iceland's Strongest Man | National | 1st | 54 | | Mosfellsbær, Iceland |
| 94 | 2020 Arnold Strongman Classic | International | 1st | 55 | 30 | (United States) Columbus, Ohio |
| 95 | 2020 Iceland's Strongest Man | National | 1st | 56 | | Reykjavík, Iceland |
| 96 | 2024 Arnold Strongman Classic | International | 4th | | | (United States) Columbus, Ohio |
| 97 | 2024 Arnold UK | International | 2nd | | | Birmingham, England |
| 98 | 2024 Iceland's Strongest Man | National | 1st | 57 | | Reykjavík, Iceland |
| 99 | 2024 Strongest Man on Earth | International | 2nd | | | (United States) Loveland, Colorado |
| 100 | 2024 Strongman Champions League Dubai | International | 1st | 58 | 31 | (United Arab Emirates) Dubai, UAE |
| 101 | 2024 Rogue Invitational | International | 2nd | | | Aberdeen, Scotland |
| 102 | 2025 Arnold Strongman Classic | International | 3rd | | | (United States) Columbus, Ohio |
| 103 | 2025 Siberian Power Show | International | 2nd | | | Krasnoyarsk, Russia |
| 104 | 2025 Iceland's Strongest Man | National | 1st | 59 | | Reykjavík, Iceland |
| 105 | 2025 Giants Live Strongman Open (World Open) | International | 1st | 60 | 32 | Birmingham, England |
| 106 | 2026 Iceland's Strongest Man | National | 2nd | | | Reykjavík, Iceland |
| 107 | 2026 Giants Live Strongman Open (World Open) | International | 1st | 61 | 33 | Birmingham, England |

== Team ==
| # | Competition | Circuit | Result | Win tally | International title tally | Venue |
|---|---|---|---|---|---|---|
| 1 | 2012 World's Strongest Team - with (Finland) Jarno Jokinen (The Vikings) | International | 1st | 62 | 34 | (Republic of Ireland) Mullingar, Ireland |
| 2 | 2014 World's Strongest Team - with (Iceland) Ari Gunnarsson (The Vikings) | International | 4th | | | Stoke-on-Trent, England |
| 3 | 2015 World's Strongest Team - with (Slovenia) Matjaz Belsak (The Vikings) | International | 1st | 63 | 35 | Stoke-on-Trent, England |

== See also ==
- List of World Records and feats of strength by Hafþór Júlíus Björnsson
