= 2014 World's Strongest Man =

Strongman competition in 2014

Competition information
- Dates: 22–29 March 2014
- Venue: Los Angeles
- Location: Commerce, California
- Country: United States
- Athletes participating: 30
- Nations participating: 18

Champion(s)
- (Lithuania) Zydrunas Savickas

The 2014 World's Strongest Man was the 37th edition of World's Strongest Man. The event was held in multiple venues in the Los Angeles County area, the same host area as the 2012 World's Strongest Man contest. The qualifying heats were held from March 22–25 and the finals on March 28 & 29. The event was sponsored by the Commerce Casino and began broadcasting in the United States on the CBS Sports Network from July 4-August 13, 2014.

Zydrunas Savickas from Lithuania finished in first place, winning his fourth WSM title. Hafþór Júlíus Björnsson from Iceland finished in second place, and Brian Shaw from the United States came in third.

== Participants ==
- Mike Burke (United States)
- Terry Hollands (United Kingdom)
- Warrick Brant (Australia)
- Tomas Rodriguez (Cuba)
- Øyvind Rein (Norway)
- Frankie Scheun (South Africa)
- Hafþór Júlíus Björnsson (Iceland)
- Jean-François Caron (Canada)
- Dave Ostlund (United States)
- Rafal Kobylarz (Poland)
- Ben Kelsey (United Kingdom)
- Robert Oberst (United States)
- Jerry Pritchett (United States)
- Eddie Hall (United Kingdom)
- Mike Caruso (United States)
- Grzegorz Szymanski (Poland)
- Dimitar Savatinov (Bulgaria)
- Lauri Nami (Estonia)
- Zydrunas Savickas (Lithuania)
- Laurence Shahlaei (United Kingdom)
- Mark Felix (United Kingdom)
- Nick Best (United States)
- Bjørn Andre Solvang (Norway)
- Eben Le Roux (Australia)
- Brian Shaw (United States)
- Martin Wildauer (Austria)
- Graham Hicks (United Kingdom)
- Mikhail Shivlyakov (Russia)
- Gerhard Van Staden (South Africa)
- Scott Cummine (Canada)

== Heat Results ==
Unlike previous years when 10 athletes qualified for the finals, this year there were 12 qualifying spots. The top 2 from each heat qualified, as well as the 2 highest scoring 3rd place athletes from all 5 heats.

=== Heat 1 ===
#	Name	Nationality	Pts
1	Mike Burke	United States	29
2	Terry Hollands	England	27.5
3	Warrick Brant	Australia	26
4	Tomas Rodriguez	Cuba	17.5
5	Øyvind Rein	Norway	12
6	Frankie Scheun	South Africa	9 (Inj)

=== Heat 2 ===
#	Name	Nationality	Pts
1	Hafþór Júlíus Björnsson	Iceland	33.5
2	Jean-François Caron	Canada	26
3	Dave Ostlund	United States	25.5
4	Rafal Kobylarz	Poland	16
5	Ben Kelsey	England	11
6	Robert Oberst	United States	10 (Inj)

=== Heat 3 ===
#	Name	Nationality	Pts
1	Jerry Pritchett	United States	25.5
2	Eddie Hall	England	24.5
3	Mike Caruso	United States	20.5
4	Grzegorz Szymanski	Poland	20
5	Dimitar Savatinov	Bulgaria	19.5
6	Lauri Nami	Estonia	16

=== Heat 4 ===
#	Name	Nationality	Pts
1	Zydrunas Savickas	Lithuania	28.5
2	Laurence Shahlaei	England	25.5
3	Mark Felix	England	23.5
4	Nick Best	United States	22
5	Bjørn Andre Solvang	Norway	16.5
6	Eben Le Roux	Australia	9

=== Heat 5 ===
#	Name	Nationality	Pts
1	Brian Shaw	United States	27
2	Martin Wildauer	Austria	26
3	Graham Hicks	England	22
4	Mikhail Shivlyakov	Russia	18
5	Gerhard Van Staden	South Africa	17.5
6	Scott Cummine	Canada	14.5

== Finals Events Results ==
=== Event 1: Loading Race ===
- Weight: 3 x 100 kilograms (220 lb) tyres
- Time limit: 60 seconds

#	Name	Nationality	Time (sec)	Event Pts	Overall Pts
1	Hafþór Júlíus Björnsson	Iceland	36.07	12	12
2	Zydrunas Savickas	Lithuania	38.49	11	11
3	Mike Burke	United States	41.85	10	10
4	Brian Shaw	United States	44.18	9	9
5	Dave Ostlund	United States	49.66	8	8
6	Martin Wildauer	Austria	51.38	7	7
7	Terry Hollands	England	52.34	6	6
8	Jerry Pritchett	United States	53.23	5	5
9	Warrick Brant	Australia	54.20	4	4
10	Jean-François Caron	Canada	55.60	3	3
11	Laurence Shahlaei	England	55.92	2	2
12	Eddie Hall	England	57.07	1	1

=== Event 2: Overhead Medley ===
- Weight: 1 x 105 kilograms (231 lb) dumbbell, 1 x 163 kilograms (359 lb) for 2 repetitions each
- Time limit: 60 seconds

#	Name	Nationality	Time (sec)	Event Pts	Overall Pts
1	Zydrunas Savickas	Lithuania	4 in 26.42	12	23
2	Hafþór Júlíus Björnsson	Iceland	4 in 28.46	11	23
3	Brian Shaw	United States	4 in 29.02	10	19
4	Mike Burke	United States	4 in 30.58	9	19
5	Laurence Shahlaei	England	4 in 57.44	8	10
6	Eddie Hall	England	3 in 40.17	7	8
7	Jean-François Caron	Canada	3 in 46.30	6	9
8	Warrick Brant	Australia	1 in 26.50	5	9
9	Terry Hollands	England	1 in 52.15	4	10
10	Dave Ostlund	United States	0	0	8
10	Martin Wildauer	Austria	0	0	7
10	Jerry Pritchett	United States	0	0	5

=== Event 3: Keg Toss ===
- Weight: 8 Keg series ranging from 18–25 kilograms (40–55 lb)
- Bar Height: 4.9 metres (16 ft)
- Time limit: 60 seconds

#	Name	Nationality	Time (sec)	Event Pts	Overall Pts
1	Hafþór Júlíus Björnsson	Iceland	8 in 16.35	12	35
2	Brian Shaw	United States	8 in 16.59	11	30
3	Mike Burke	United States	8 in 28.94	10	29
4	Zydrunas Savickas	Lithuania	8 in 30.42	9	32
5	Terry Hollands	England	6 in 60	6	16
5	Eddie Hall	England	6 in 60	6	14
5	Dave Ostlund	United States	6 in 60	6	14
5	Warrick Brant	Australia	6 in 60	6	15
5	Martin Wildauer	Austria	6 in 60	6	13
10	Jerry Pritchett	United States	4 in 60	2	7
10	Laurence Shahlaei	England	4 in 60	2	12
10	Jean-François Caron	Canada	4 in 60	2	11

=== Event 4: Truck Pull ===
- Weight: 24,000 kilograms (53,000 lb)
- Course length: 25 metres (82 ft)
- Time limit: 60 seconds

#	Name	Nationality	Time (sec)	Event Pts	Overall Pts
1	Brian Shaw	United States	40.56	12	42
2	Hafþór Júlíus Björnsson	Iceland	42.12	11	46
3	Terry Hollands	England	43.35	10	26
4	Zydrunas Savickas	Lithuania	44.15	9	41
5	Dave Ostlund	United States	50.10	8	22
6	Mike Burke	United States	53.51	7	36
7	Martin Wildauer	Austria	24.2 metres (79 ft)	6	19
8	Laurence Shahlaei	England	23.1 metres (76 ft)	5	17
9	Jean-François Caron	Canada	22.7 metres (74 ft)	4	15
10	Eddie Hall	England	21.4 metres (70 ft)	3	17
11	Jerry Pritchett	United States	19.1 metres (63 ft)	2	9
12	Warrick Brant	Australia	17.3 metres (57 ft)	1	16

=== Event 5: Squat Lift ===
- Weight: 329 kilograms (725 lb)
- Time limit: 60 seconds

#	Name	Nationality	Repetitions	Event Pts	Overall Pts
1	Zydrunas Savickas	Lithuania	15	12	53
2	Eddie Hall	England	14	11	28
3	Jerry Pritchett	United States	11	10	19
4	Brian Shaw	United States	10	9	51
5	Laurence Shahlaei	England	8	7.5	24.5
5	Warrick Brant	Australia	8	7.5	23.5
7	Hafþór Júlíus Björnsson	Iceland	7	5.5	51.5
7	Jean-François Caron	Canada	7	5.5	20.5
9	Mike Burke	United States	3	4	40
10	Terry Hollands	England	2	3	29
11	Dave Ostlund	United States	1	2	24
12	Martin Wildauer	Austria	0	0	19

=== Event 6: Atlas Stones ===
- Weight: 5 Stone series ranging from 130–186 kilograms (287–410 lb)
- Time limit: 60 seconds

#	Name	Nationality	Time (sec)	Event Pts	Overall Pts
1	Hafþór Júlíus Björnsson	Iceland	5 in 19.46	12	63.5
2	Zydrunas Savickas	Lithuania	5 in 23.53	11	64
3	Brian Shaw	United States	5 in 23.94	10	61
4	Terry Hollands	England	5 in 28.47	9	38
5	Dave Ostlund	United States	5 in 32.57	8	32
6	Jerry Pritchett	United States	5 in 34.68	7	26
7	Mike Burke	United States	5 in 36.92	6	46
8	Warrick Brant	Australia	5 in 37.02	5	28.5
9	Eddie Hall	England	5 in 38.32	4	32
10	Martin Wildauer	Austria	5 in 38.85	3	22
11	Jean-François Caron	Canada	5 in 47.04	2	22.5
12	Laurence Shahlaei	England	3 in 23.44	1	25.5

== Final standings ==
#	Name	Nationality	Pts
1st place, gold medalist(s)	Zydrunas Savickas	Lithuania	64
2nd place, silver medalist(s)	Hafþór Júlíus Björnsson	Iceland	63.5
3rd place, bronze medalist(s)	Brian Shaw	United States	61
4	Mike Burke	United States	46
5	Terry Hollands	United Kingdom	38
6	Eddie Hall	United Kingdom	32
6	Dave Ostlund	United States	32
8	Warrick Brant	Australia	28.5
9	Jerry Pritchett	United States	26
10	Laurence Shahlaei	United Kingdom	25.5
11	Jean-François Caron	Canada	22.5
12	Martin Wildauer	Austria	22

Preceded by 2013 World's Strongest Man	2014 World's Strongest Man	Succeeded by 2015 World's Strongest Man
