= Lundstrom Stones =

Pair of lifting stones

The Lundstrom Stones or Lundstrom Walking Stones (Note: Not to be confused with the 191.5 kg (422 lb) Lundstrom Lifting Stone which is a different single stone located in Stoneham, Massachusetts.) (previously known as the Loon Stones) are a pair of American natural lifting stones located in Charlestown, New Hampshire. They are used as a test of physical strength and endurance.

== History ==
The pair of stones were found by blacksmith and stone-lifter John Lundstrom from North Reading, Massachusetts who often competed at farmer's walk type events during the late 70s and early 80s as a member of Clan Anderson. At the time, the heaviest stones used in Highland games in both United States and Canada were up to a combined 186 kg (410 lb), and they were not challenging enough. Lundstrom searched through local quarries to find something suitable in the range of 227 kg (500 lb).

== Specifications ==
In 1983, after searching along the rock-strewn channel of the East Branch of the Pemigewasset River, Lundstrom found two near elliptical stones which he thought would suffice the new challenge. One of them had a smooth surface and the other was rough, giving them a unique appearance. After drilling and forging the two stones with steel rods, they were connected to a couple of iron gripping rings by a couple of chains. Originally it was said that the rough stone weighed 124.5 kg (274 lb) and the smooth stone weighed 106 kg (234 lb) for a combined weight of 230.5 kg (508 lb). However upon a recent 2026 weighing of the stones for challenge competition in Maine, the rough stone weighed in at 236 lb (107 kg) and the smooth stone weighed in at 232 lb (105 kg) for a combined weight of 468 lb (212 kg).

The objective is to pick up the two stones from their rings, stand upright, and then walk them as far as possible in farmer's walk style before the grip gives out. Walking them has been a staple event at the Loon Mountain Highland Games of New Hampshire, the Quechee games, the No Fame Games, the former Festival at Fort 4, the Maine Highland Games, and as one of the stones available to lift on tour with New England Stone Lifting.

Since the death of Lundstrom in 2013, the stones stayed at Loon Mountain resort under the supervision of NHHG / NHScot and long time NHHG Athletic Directors Bill and Holly Crawford. Once the Crawfords resigned as Athletic Directors, Robert Troupe went on a successful extraction mission from Loon Mountain. He now acts as the custodian of the stones.

== World records ==
- All-time world record – 42.93 metres (140 ft 10 in) by Hafþór Júlíus Björnsson (Iceland) (2015)

→ Former record holders include Gerard Benderoth, Marshall White, Benedikt Magnússon, Stefán Sölvi Pétursson and Wade Gillingham.

- Master's (40y+) record – 14.28 metres (46 ft 10 in) by John Lundstrom (United States) (2011)
- Women's record – 4.72 metres (15 ft 6 in) by Hannah Linzay (United States) (2025)
