= Vehicle pull =

Vehicle pulls done in Strongman competitions

Vehicle pull is a Strongman event featured in World’s Strongest Man and other similar competitions which requires competitors to pull extremely heavy trucks, buses, tanks, trains or aeroplanes while being attached to a harness that is connected to the vehicle. The heavier the vehicle is, a rope is provided for them to pull on. The person who completes the course in the fastest time or covers the most distance is declared the winner.

== History ==
In 1920s, farmers in Bowling Green, Missouri and Vaughnsville, Ohio began hitching their field tractors to weighted sleds and roared down a track to see who could pull it the farthest, which gathered a lot of spectators. After the tractor pull was a successful spectators event for many years, there was also an event started called the truck pull which became even more famous and continued until strongman Vehicle pull came into play with the inaugural World’s Strongest Man in 1977.

== In Strongman competitions ==
Since 1977, Vehicle pulls involving numerous trucks, buses, trains and planes have been used in more than 460 events organized by World’s Strongest Man, Europe’s Strongest Man, Pure Strength, Arnold Strongman Classic-Europe, World's Ultimate Strongman, Giants Live, International Federation of Strength Athletes, World Strongman Cup Federation, Strongman Champions League and in several National competitions of Australia, Canada, Finland, Germany, Great Britain, Iceland, Lithuania, Netherlands, Norway, Poland, Slovenia, Sweden, Ukraine and the United States.

In the World’s Strongest Man competition, the vehicle is often chosen to reference a previous winner or the current host city of the current competition; and the terrains change yearly as well, with vehicles being pulled on snow, ice, sand, concrete etc.

== Physical demands ==
Vehicle pulls are a true test of brute strength and endurance which literally causes the heart rate to hit its maximum within just a few seconds. The start is the hardest as it persuades an extremely heavy vehicle (most often between 10 - 25 tonnes, and up to 40 tonnes) to start moving from a standstill upon overcoming its inertia. Once the vehicle is moving, it is essential that the strongman continues its momentum because it is a rare sight to see someone restart pulling the vehicle for a second time once it has stopped. The biggest and heaviest strongmen are usually the people who excel in this event because the heavier the strongman is, the easier is it for them to lean against the weight of the vehicle and get it moving.

== Notable Strongmen ==
Below depicts the 10 greatest Vehicle pullers in competitive Strongman (international circuit only/ open category only). All of them have won more than 10, and 4 of them have won more than 15 Vehicle pull events in their careers. With 25 wins at more than 2 wins per every 3 Vehicle pulls he undertook, and with 19 current world records Iceland's Hafþór Júlíus Björnsson is the Greatest Vehicle puller in Strongman history.

#	Name	Nationality	Peak stats	Events	Wins	Win %
1	Hafþór Júlíus Björnsson	Iceland	2.05 m (6 ft 9 in), 205 kg (452 lb)	37	25	67.57%
2	Žydrūnas Savickas	Lithuania	1.91 m (6 ft 3 in), 182 kg (401 lb)	63	23	36.51%
3	Kelvin de Ruiter	Netherlands	2.03 m (6 ft 8 in), 174 kg (384 lb)	38	19	50.00%
4	Ervin Katona	Serbia	1.87 m (6 ft 2 in), 150 kg (330 lb)	56	15	26.79%
5	Matjaž Belšak	Slovenia	1.85 m (6 ft 1 in), 152 kg (335 lb)	52	14	26.92%
6	Mariusz Pudzianowski	Poland	1.85 m (6 ft 1 in), 145 kg (320 lb)	30	13	43.33%
7	Magnus Samuelsson	Sweden	2.01 m (6 ft 7 in), 154 kg (340 lb)	38	13	34.21%
8	Terry Hollands	England	1.99 m (6 ft 6 in), 195 kg (430 lb)	38	12	31.58%
9	Mateusz Kieliszkowski	Poland	1.95 m (6 ft 5 in), 150 kg (330 lb)	22	11	50.00%
10	Krzysztof Radzikowski	Poland	1.88 m (6 ft 2 in), 148 kg (326 lb)	60	11	18.33%

- As at 17 August 2025
