= World's Strongest Viking =

International strongman competition

Tournament information
- Location: Norway (2014–2023); Finland (2023–)
- Established: 2014
- Format: Multi-event competition

Current champion
- (Poland) Adam Roszkowski

World's Strongest Viking is a leading international Strongman competition organized by Strongman Champions League. It was held as a winter edition from 2014 to 2023, and as a summer edition from 2023 onwards, both with participation of top strongman athletes in the world. At the end of each edition, the winner is conferred with the title 'World's Strongest Viking'.

== History ==
The roots of the competition goes back to the Nordic Strongman Championships which was continued until 2013 with participation of athletes from Iceland, Norway, Sweden, Finland and Denmark. In 2014, Giants Live upscaled it to global level, officially renaming the competition and the title to 'World's Strongest Viking'. In 2015, Strongman Champions League took over.

During the initial nine editions, it was held under freezing and perilous weather conditions in winter at Vinstra, Norway, testing the athletes to their limits. The first nine editions also extensively featured vintage Viking events. Upon the introduction of summer format in 2023, the competition was shifted to the months of June to August and was held in Hämeenlinna and Joensuu in Finland.

== Events ==
Among the most iconic events were Viking deadlift, Viking boat pull, Viking press, Viking ship mast super yoke, Hercules hold, power stairs and Atlas stones. The competitions were noted for their heavily wood crafted implements and replicating historical feats of strength. One of the most legendary moments of the competitions came in 2015 when Iceland's Hafþór Júlíus Björnsson surpassed the historical 1,000 years old Viking ship mast (Ormrinn langi) feat of strength by carrying a 650 kg (1,433 lb), 10 metres (33 ft) long, 1.41 metres (4 ft 8 in) circumference Viking ship mast on his back for 5 steps in −20 °C weather.

== Championship results ==
Winter format (the competitions were also known by the names Giants Live Norway in 2014 and SCL Norway from 2015 to 2021).

Year	Champion	Runner-up	3rd place	Location
2014	(Iceland) Hafþór Júlíus Björnsson	(Sweden) David Nyström	(United Kingdom) Terry Hollands	Vinstra, Norway
2015	(Iceland) Hafþór Júlíus Björnsson	(Poland) Krzysztof Radzikowski	(Canada) Jean-François Caron	Vinstra, Norway
2016	(Canada) Jean-François Caron	(Slovenia) Matjaz Belsak	(Poland) Krzysztof Radzikowski	Vinstra, Norway
2017	(Canada) Jean-François Caron	(Poland) Krzysztof Radzikowski	(United States) Luke Herrick	Vinstra, Norway
2018	(Poland) Krzysztof Radzikowski	(Germany) Dennis Kohlruss	(United States) Luke Herrick	Vinstra, Norway
2019	(Poland) Krzysztof Radzikowski	(Norway) Ole Martin Kristiansen	(Finland) Mika Törrö	Vinstra, Norway
2020	(Republic of Ireland) Sean O'Hagan	(Latvia) Aivars Šmaukstelis	(Finland) Mika Törrö	Vinstra, Norway
2021	(Latvia) Dainis Zageris	(Netherlands) Kelvin de Ruiter	(Norway) Henrik Hildeskor	Vinstra, Norway
2023	(Sweden) Johan Espenkrona	(United States) Eric Dawson	(Norway) Øyvind Gustavsen	Vinstra, Norway

Summer format

Year	Champion	Runner-up	3rd place	Location
2023	(United Kingdom) Kane Francis	(Estonia) Ervin Toots	(Iceland) Sigfús Fossdal	Hämeenlinna, Finland
2025	(Poland) Adam Roszkowski	(Netherlands) Kevin Hazeleger	(Sweden) Jesper Hansson	Joensuu, Finland
2026	(Poland) Adam Roszkowski	(Hungary) Péter Juhász	(Sweden) Jesper Hansson	Turenki, Finland

== Signature world records ==
- Viking ship mast (Ormrinn langi) carry – 650 kg (1,433 lb), 10 m (33 ft) long, 1.41 m (4 ft 8 in) circumference log for 5 steps
  (Iceland) Hafþór Júlíus Björnsson (2015)
- Viking boat pull (with the sails intact) – 3,000 kg (6,614 lb) harness only/ no rope for 25 meters 'in ice terrain' - 18.87 seconds
  (Iceland) Hafþór Júlíus Björnsson (2015)
- Viking boat pull (with the sails intact) – 3,000 kg (6,614 lb) harness only/ no rope for 20 meters 'in ice terrain' - 16.12 seconds
  (Finland) Mika Törrö (2019)
- Viking boat pull (without the sails) – 3,000 kg (6,614 lb) harness only/ no rope for 25 meters 'in ice terrain' - 16.67 seconds
  (Poland) Krzysztof Radzikowski (2017)
- Viking press (for reps) – 160 kg (353 lb) x 19 reps
  (Norway) Bjørn Andre Solvang (2017)
- Viking sword front hold (27 kg (60 lb)) – 1 minute 33.01 seconds
  (Sweden) David Nyström (2014)
- Viking lumberjack tree-sledge pull – 900 kg (1,984 lb) harness only/ no rope for 24 meters 'in ice terrain' - 26.06 seconds
  (Iceland) Hafþór Júlíus Björnsson (2014)
- Viking wheel of pain – 3,000 kg (6,614 lb) for 78.82 metres (258 ft 7 in) within a 60 seconds time limit 'in ice terrain'
  (Norway) Øyvind Gustavsen (2023)
