= Mike Jenkins (strongman) =

American strongman (1982–2013)

- Jenkins at the 2011 World's Strongest Man

Personal information
- Nationality: American
- Born: November 3, 1982 Westminster, Maryland, U.S.
- Died: November 28, 2013 (aged 31) Dauphin County, Pennsylvania, U.S.
- Years active: 2007–2013
- Height: 198 cm (6 ft 6 in)
- Weight: 182 kg (401 lb)
- Spouse: Keri Jenkins (m. 2012)

Sport
- Sport: Strongman competitions
Medal record
Representing the United States
World's Strongest Man
8th	2011 World's Strongest Man
5th	2012 World's Strongest Man
4th	2013 World's Strongest Man
Arnold Strongman Classic
2nd	2011 Arnold Strongman Classic
1st	2012 Arnold Strongman Classic
Giants Live
2nd	2011 Poland
1st	2012 Australia
America's Strongest Man
2nd	2010 America's Strongest Man
Arnold Pro Strongman World Series
1st	2010 Amateur
Maryland's Strongest Man
1st	2007 MSM

Mike Jenkins (November 3, 1982 – November 28, 2013) was an American professional strongman competitor from Westminster, Maryland. During his short pro career, Jenkins competed at the highest level of the sport. In 2012, Jenkins won the Arnold Strongman Classic, regarded as one of the most prestigious competitions in strongman.

Jenkins died at age 31 after only three years of pro-level competition.

== Early life ==
Jenkins was a precocious athlete, reportedly weighing 225 pounds, squatting 400 pounds, and benching 315 pounds in sixth grade. He played college football, first at Kent State and later at James Madison University, where he was a starting offensive lineman for their 2004 FCS national championship.

After college, Jenkins briefly played for the arena football team the Georgia Force. After leaving football and throughout his strongman career, Jenkin worked as a high school athletics director at Milton Hershey School in Hershey, Pennsylvania.

Jenkins began pursuing strongman as he felt "aimless" without participating in sports. His first competition was Maryland's Strongest Man contest in 2007. He won, qualifying him for the North American amateur national strongman championships later that year. There, he placed sixth against a field of approximately 100 competitors. He placed second in the North American nationals in 2009.

== Strongman career ==
Jenkins competed in the inaugural Arnold Amateur Strongman World Championships in 2010 and won that contest. This victory earned him his pro strongman card, as well as an invitation to the 2011 Arnold Strongman Classic. He competed in the 2010 America's Strongest Man later in the year and placed second behind 3-time champion Derek Poundstone.

He entered the 2011 Arnold Strongman Classic placing second overall ahead of the reigning World's Strongest Man, Zydrunas Savickas. Later that year, he qualified for the finals of the 2011 World's Strongest Man contest, where he won the first two events but ultimately finished in eighth place overall after withdrawing after suffering a back injury.

Jenkins won the 2012 Arnold Strongman Classic, finishing ahead of former champions Derek Poundstone, Zydrunas Savickas and Brian Shaw, and won the Giants Live event in Melbourne, Victoria, Australia on March 17, 2012, which qualified him for the 2012 World's Strongest Man contest later in the year. He set a joint world record in the hip lift event with Nick Best with a lift of 1,150 kilograms (2,540 lb). In the 2012 World's Strongest Man contest, Jenkins again reached the finals and finished in fifth place.

His final professional strongman competition was the 2013 World's Strongest Man contest, where he finished in fourth overall in the finals.

Mike Jenkins died on November 28, 2013, aged 31, in Dauphin County, Pennsylvania from an enlarged heart, suspected to be caused by long-term steroid use.

== Personal records ==
- Deadlift (on Stiff bar at a 1-inch deficit) – 400 kg (882 lb) (2013 World's Strongest Man)
- Hummer Tire Deadlift – 423 kg (933 lb) (2011 Arnold Strongman Classic)
- Hip lift – 1,150 kg (2,535 lb) (2012 Giants Live FitX Melbourne) (joint-world record)
- Log press – 210 kg (463 lb) (2012 World's Strongest Man) (Former American Record)
- Log press/ Austrian Oak (for reps) – 200 kg (441 lb) x 2 reps (2012 Arnold Strongman Classic)
- Circus Dumbbell press (for reps) – 116 kg (256 lb) x 7 reps (2012 Arnold Strongman Classic) (former world record)
- Manhood Stone (Max Atlas Stone) for reps – 243 kg (536 lb) x 2 reps over 4 ft bar (2011 Arnold Strongman Classic)
