= 2021 Europe's Strongest Man =

Competition information
- Dates: 4 September 2021
- Venue: First Direct Arena
- Location: Leeds
- Country: United Kingdom
- Athletes participating: 10
- Nations participating: 6

Champion(s)
- (United Kingdom) Luke Stoltman

The 2021 Europe's Strongest Man was a strongman competition that took place in Leeds, England on 4 September 2021 at the First Direct Arena. This event was part of the 2021 Giants live tour.

Defending champion Luke Richardson did not take part in the competition as he was recovering from an injury with Luke Stoltman winning the competition.

== Participants ==
- Luke Stoltman (UK)
- Graham Hicks (UK)
- Oleksii Novikov (UKR)
- Marius Lalas (LTU)
- Rauno Heinla (EST)
- Pa O'Dwyer (IRL)
- Adam Bishop (UK)
- Ervin Toots (EST)
- Johnny Hansson (SWE)
- Gavin Bilton (UK)

== Results of events ==
=== Event 1: Max Log Lift ===
- Notes: Starting weight was 180 kilograms (400 lb).

#	Athlete	Nation	Weight	Event Points	Overall Points
1	Luke Stoltman	United Kingdom	195 kilograms (430 lb)	9.5	9.5
1	Graham Hicks	United Kingdom	195 kilograms (430 lb)	9.5	9.5
3	Oleksii Novikov	Ukraine	180 kilograms (400 lb)	8	8
—	Marius Lalas	Lithuania	N/A	0	0
—	Rauno Heinla	Estonia	N/A	0	0
—	Pa O'Dwyder	Ireland	N/A	0	0
—	Adam Bishop	United Kingdom	N/A	0	0
—	Ervin Toots	Estonia	N/A	0	0
—	Johnny Hansson	Sweden	N/A	0	0
—	Gavin Bilton	United Kingdom	N/A	0	0

=== Event 2: Shield Carry ===
- Weight: 200 kilograms (440 lb) for longest distance possible.

#	Athlete	Nation	Distance	Event Points	Overall Points
1	Marius Lalas	Lithuania	54.20	10	10
2	Luke Stoltman	United Kingdom	42.20	9	18.5
3	Ervin Toots	Estonia	37.70	8	8
4	Rauno Heinla	Estonia	37.05	7	7
5	Pa O'Dwyder	Ireland	34.65	6	6
6	Gavin Bilton	United Kingdom	32.10	5	5
7	Oleksii Novikov	Ukraine	27.65	4	12
8	Graham Hicks	United Kingdom	27.40	3	12.5
9	Johnny Hansson	Sweden	22.30	2	2
10	Adam Bishop (Note: Adam Bishop sustained an injury in this event and took no further part in the competition.)	United Kingdom	7.45	1	1

=== Event 3: Deadlift ===
- Weight: 360 kilograms (790 lb) for as many repetitions as possible.
- Time Limit: 60 seconds
- Notes: This event was completed on an axle bar.

#	Athlete	Nation	Repetitions	Event Points	Overall Points
1	Rauno Heinla	Estonia	9	10	17
2	Graham Hicks	United Kingdom	8	9	21.5
3	Oleksii Novikov	Ukraine	6	7	19
3	Marius Lalas	Lithuania	6	7	17
3	Pa O'Dwyder	Ireland	6	7	13
6	Gavin Bilton	United Kingdom	5	5	10
7	Luke Stoltman	United Kingdom	3	4	22.5
8	Ervin Toots	Estonia	2	3	11
9	Johnny Hansson	Sweden	0	0	2

=== Event 4: Car Walk ===
- Weight: 450 kilograms (990 lb)
- Course Length: 20 metres (66 ft)

#	Athlete	Nation	Time	Event Points	Overall Points
1	Oleksii Novikov	Ukraine	11.19	10	29
2	Luke Stoltman	United Kingdom	13.59	9	31.5
3	Pa O'Dwyder	Ireland	16.07	8	21
4	Marius Lalas	Lithuania	16.79	7	24
5	Johnny Hansson	Sweden	20.60	6	8
6	Rauno Heinla	Estonia	22.84	5	22
7	Ervin Toots	Estonia	24.91	4	15
8	Graham Hicks	United Kingdom	25.76	3	24.5
9	Gavin Bilton (Note: Gavin Bilton sustained an injury in this event and took no further part in the competition.)	United Kingdom	7.73 metres (25.4 ft)	2	12

=== Event 5: Atlas Stones ===
- Weight: 5 stone series ranging from 100–180 kilograms (220–400 lb).

#	Athlete	Nation	Time	Event Points	Overall Points
1	Oleksii Novikov	Ukraine	5 in 18.74	10	39
2	Luke Stoltman	United Kingdom	5 in 20.58	9	40.5
3	Rauno Heinla	Estonia	5 in 21.20	8	30
4	Pa O'Dwyder	Ireland	5 in 22.23	7	28
5	Graham Hicks	United Kingdom	5 in 22.42	6	30.5
6	Ervin Toots	Estonia	5 in 23.50	5	20
7	Marius Lalas	Lithuania	5 in 24.76	4	28
8	Johnny Hansson	Sweden	5 in 48.01	3	11

== Final results ==
#	Athlete	Nation	Points
1st place, gold medalist(s)	Luke Stoltman	United Kingdom	40.5
2nd place, silver medalist(s)	Oleksii Novikov	Ukraine	39
3rd place, bronze medalist(s)	Graham Hicks	United Kingdom	30.5
4	Rauno Heinla	Estonia	30
5	Pa O'Dwyder	Ireland	28
6	Marius Lalas	Lithuania	28
7	Ervin Toots	Estonia	20
8	Gavin Bilton	United Kingdom	12
9	Johnny Hansson	Sweden	11
10	Adam Bishop	United Kingdom	1

Preceded by 2020 Europe's Strongest Man	Europe's Strongest Man	Succeeded by 2022 Europe's Strongest Man
