= Powerlifting at the 1997 World Games – Men's heavyweight =

Powerlifting men's heavyweight at the 1997 World Games
- Venue: Lahti, Finland
- Date: 8 August 1997
- Competitors: 6 from 5 nations

Medalists
| gold medal | (Norway) Sturla Davidsen |
| silver medal | (Norway) Carl Christoffersen |
| bronze medal | (Finland) Janne Toivanen |

The men's heavyweight competition in powerlifting at the 1997 World Games took place on 8 August 1997 in Lahti, Finland.

== Competition format ==
A total of 6 athletes entered the competition. Each athlete had 3 attempts in each of 3 events: squat, bench press and deadlift. Athlete, who came with the biggest score in Wilks points is the winner.

== Results ==
| Rank | Athlete | Nation | Weight | Squat | Bench press | Deadlift | Total weight | Total points |
|---|---|---|---|---|---|---|---|---|
| 1st place, gold medalist(s) | Sturla Davidsen | Norway | 128.5 | 395.0 | 235.0 | 362.5 | 992.5 | 562.54 |
| 2nd place, silver medalist(s) | Carl Christoffersen | Norway | 102.0 | 355.0 | 225.0 | 315.0 | 895.0 | 540.49 |
| 3rd place, bronze medalist(s) | Janne Toivanen | Finland | 98.0 | 315.0 | 207.5 | 350.0 | 872.5 | 535.36 |
| 4 | Jörgen Ljungberg | Sweden | 103.4 | 335.0 | 210.0 | 340.0 | 885.0 | 531.79 |
| 5 | Daisuke Midote | Japan | 126.0 | 380.0 | 260.0 | 285.0 | 925.0 | 526.23 |
| 6 | Arkadiy Nikitin | Kazakhstan | 108.0 | 330.0 | 200.0 | 300.0 | 830.0 | 491.27 |
