= Årsjö =

Årsjö is a Swedish surname. Notable people with the surname include:

- Johannes Årsjö (born 1985), Swedish strongman
- Ebba Årsjö (born 2001), Swedish para alpine skier
