= Powerlifting at the 2001 World Games – Men's heavyweight =

Powerlifting men's heavyweight at the 2001 World Games
- Venue: Akita City Culture Hall, Akita, Japan
- Date: 21 August 2001
- Competitors: 11 from 6 nations

Medalists
gold medal	(Japan) Daisuke Midote
silver medal	(United States) Brad Gillingham
bronze medal	(Sweden) Jörgen Ljungberg

The men's heavyweight competition in powerlifting at the 2001 World Games took place on 21 August 2001 at the Akita City Culture Hall in Akita, Japan.

== Competition format ==
A total of 11 athletes entered the competition. Each athlete had 3 attempts in each of 3 events: squat, bench press and deadlift. The athlete with the biggest score in Wilks points is the winner.

== Results ==
Rank	Athlete	Nation	Weight	Squat	Bench press	Deadlift	Total weight	Total points
1st place, gold medalist(s)	Daisuke Midote	Japan	131.8	415.0	302.5	310.0	1027.5	579.716
2nd place, silver medalist(s)	Brad Gillingham	United States	145.2	380.0	265.0	382.5	1027.5	571.085
3rd place, bronze medalist(s)	Jörgen Ljungberg	Sweden	114.9	390.0	237.5	355.0	982.5	571.029
4	Nikolay Suslov	Russia	104.4	375.0	235.0	342.5	952.5	570.357
5	Viktor Naleykin	Ukraine	134.5	395.0	225.0	370.0	990.0	556.677
6	Maxim Guryanov	Russia	128.3	380.0	255.0	330.0	965.0	547.155
7	Erik Stiklestad	Norway	98.5	340.0	205.0	332.5	877.5	537.293
8	Kazunori Sato	Japan	90.3	270.0	227.5	280.0	777.5	495.501
	Volodymyr Ivanenko	Ukraine	113.4	380.0	NM	-	DNF	DNF
	Raymond Benemerito	United States	98.3	340.0	230.0	NM	DNF	DNF
	Anthony Cardella	United States	124.6	347.5	222.5	NM	DNF	DNF
