= 2011 World's Strongest Man =

Strongman competition in 2011

Competition information
- Dates: 15–22 September 2011
- Venue: Wingate University
- Location: Wingate, North Carolina
- Country: United States
- Athletes participating: 30
- Nations participating: 16

Champion(s)
- (United States) Brian Shaw

The 2011 World's Strongest Man was the 34th edition of World's Strongest Man and was held on the campus grounds of Wingate University in Wingate, North Carolina, US. The event was sponsored by MET-Rx. The qualifying heats were scheduled for September 15–18, and the finals on September 21 and 22, 2011.

Brian Shaw placed first, 2009 and 2010 champion Zydrunas Savickas placed second, and Terry Hollands placed third.

== Participants ==
- Brian Shaw (United States)
- Hafþór Júlíus Björnsson (Iceland)
- Mark Felix (England)
- Jean-François Caron (Canada)
- Rauno Heinla (Estonia)
- Nick Best (United States)
- Laurence Shahlaei (England)
- Ervin Katona (Serbia)
- Espen Aune (Norway)
- Serhiy Romanchuk (Ukraine)
- Paul Pîrjol (Romania)
- Travis Ortmayer (United States)
- Vytautas Lalas (Lithuania)
- Terry Hollands (England)
- Martin Wildauer (Austria)
- Mateusz Baron (Poland)
- Jason Bergmann (United States)
- Juha Matti Järvi (Finland)
- Žydrūnas Savickas (Lithuania)
- Mike Jenkins (United States)
- Louis-Philippe Jean (Canada)
- Josh Thigpen (United States)
- Alexander Klyushev (Russia)
- Rob Frampton (England)
- Derek Poundstone (United States)
- Stefán Sölvi Pétursson (Iceland)
- Jack McIntosh (England)
- Krzysztof Radzikowski (Poland)
- Vidas Blekaitis (Lithuania)
- Derek Boyer (Fiji)

== Heat results ==
=== Heat 1 ===
- Loading Race: 4 kegs, 2 weighing 115 kilograms (254 lb), 2 weighing 120 kilograms (260 lb). 1 minute 15 second time limit.
- Car Walk: 450 kilograms (990 lb) down a 25 metres (82 ft) course. 1 minute 15 second time limit.
- Truck Pull: 12,000 kilograms (26,000 lb) down a 20 metres (66 ft) course. 1 minute 15 second time limit.
- Deadlift: Car deadlift weighing 360 kilograms (790 lb). 1 minute 15 second time limit.
- Dumbbell Press: 4 dumbbells weighing between 100–115 kilograms (220–254 lb). 1 minute 30 second time limit.
- Atlas Stones: 5 stones weighing between 120–180 kilograms (260–400 lb). 1 minute 15 second time limit.

#	Name	Event 1 Loading Race	Event 2 Car Walk	Event 3 Truck Pull	Event 4 Deadlift	Event 5 Dumbbell Press	Event 6 Atlas Stones	Pts
1	(United States) Brian Shaw	1st - 4 in 39.64s	1st - 16.88s	2nd - 48.03s	3rd - 6 reps	1st - 4 in 36.49s	1st - 5 in 22.36s	33
2	(Iceland) Hafþór Júlíus Björnsson	3rd - 4 in 43.51s	4th - 25.72s	1st - 38.94s	4th - 5 reps	2nd - 3 in 38.69s	2nd - 5 in 28.58s	25.5
3	(England) Mark Felix	4th - 4 in 44.60s	3rd - 24.72s	3rd - 18.56 metres (60.9 ft)	1st - 11 reps	4th - 1 in 5.77s	6th - 4 in 27.26s	21
4	(Canada) Jean-François Caron	6th - 4 in 49.53s	5th - 1m 5.53s	4th - 18.34 metres (60.2 ft)	2nd - 9 reps	5th - 1 in 6.03s	3rd - 5 in 47.42s	17
5	(Estonia) Rauno Heinla	2nd - 4 in 41.26s	6th - 17.1 metres (56 ft)	6th - 10.82 metres (35.5 ft)	4th - 5 reps	3rd - 2 in 81.03s	5th - 5 in 58.01s	15.5
6	(United States) Nick Best	5th - 4 in 47.11s	2nd - 23.22s	5th - 17.88 metres (58.7 ft)	6th - 4 reps	6th - 0 in 1m 30s	4th - 5 in 53.05s	13

=== Heat 2 ===
- Loading Race: 4 sacks weighing 125 kilograms (276 lb). 1 minute 15 second time limit.
- Keg Toss: 8 kegs weighing between 18–25 kilograms (40–55 lb) over a 4 metres (13 ft) bar. 1 minute 15 second time limit.
- Squat Lift: 325 kilograms (717 lb) 1 minute 15 second time limit.
- Truck Pull: 12,000 kilograms (26,000 lb) down a 20 metres (66 ft) course. 1 minute 15 second time limit.
- Dumbbell Press: 4 dumbbells weighing between 100–115 kilograms (220–254 lb). 1 minute 30 second time limit.
- Atlas Stones: 5 stones weighing between 120–180 kilograms (260–400 lb). 1 minute 15 second time limit.

#	Name	Event 1 Loading Race	Event 2 Keg Toss	Event 3 Squat Lift	Event 4 Truck Pull	Event 5 Dumbbell Press	Event 6 Atlas Stones	Pts
1	(England) Laurence Shahlaei	2nd - 4 in 51.64s	2nd - 7 in 75.00s	1st - 8 reps	3rd - 16.5 metres (54 ft)	1st - 3 in 61.21s	3rd - 4 in 32.26s	30
2	(Serbia) Ervin Katona	1st - 4 in 50.04s	1st - 8 in 21.88s	5th - 0 reps	1st - 19.4 metres (64 ft)	3rd - 0 in 1m 30s	2nd - 4 in 27.64s	23
3	(Norway) Espen Aune	4th - 3 in 39.35s	5th - 3 in 1m 15s	2nd - 5 reps	2nd - 18.35 metres (60.2 ft)	3rd - 0 in 1m 30s	1st - 4 in 25.48s	21
4	(Ukraine) Serhiy Romanchuk	3rd - 3 in 37.72s	4th - 5 in 1m 15s	3rd - 4 reps	4th - 14.5 metres (48 ft)	3rd - 0 in 1m 30s	4th - 4 in 42.83s	17
5	(Romania) Paul Pîrjol	6th - 3 in 46.57s	6th - 2 in 1m 15s	4th - 2 reps	5th - 4.5 metres (15 ft)	2nd - 2 in 18.30s	5th - 4 in 51.42s	14
6	(United States) Travis Ortmayer	5th - 3 in 39.66s	3rd - 6 in 1m 15s	6th - 0 reps	Withdrew	Withdrew	Withdrew	6

=== Heat 3 ===
- Loading Race: 4 sacks weighing 125 kilograms (276 lb). 1 minute 15 second time limit.
- Keg Toss: 8 kegs weighing between 18–25 kilograms (40–55 lb) over a 4 metres (13 ft) bar. 1 minute 15 second time limit.
- Car Walk: 450 kilograms (990 lb) down a 25 metres (82 ft) course. 1 minute 15 second time limit.
- Deadlift: Car deadlift weighing 360 kilograms (790 lb). 1 minute 15 second time limit.
- Block Press: 4 blocks weighing between 110–150 kilograms (240–330 lb). 1 minute 30 second time limit.
- Atlas Stones: 5 stones weighing between 120–180 kilograms (260–400 lb). 1 minute 15 second time limit.

#	Name	Event 1 Loading Race	Event 2 Keg Toss	Event 3 Car Walk	Event 4 Deadlift	Event 5 Block Press	Event 6 Atlas Stones	Pts
1	(Lithuania) Vytautas Lalas	1st - 4 in 44.08s	1st - 8 in 35.48s	2nd - 22.13s	1st - 10 reps	1st - 3 in 29.67s	2nd - in 39.93s	34.0
2	(England) Terry Hollands	3rd - 4 in 58.64s	2nd - 7 in 1m 15s	1st - 14.19s	2nd - 9 reps	5th - 2 in 25.46s	1st - 5 in 36.82	27.0
3	(Austria) Martin Wildauer	2nd - 4 in 48.93s	2nd - 7 in 1m 15s	3rd - 28.22s	2nd - 9 reps	6th - 2 in 61.14s	6th - 2 in 29.47s	20.0
4	(Poland) Mateusz Baron	4th - 4 in 73.17s	4th - 4 in 1m 15s	6th - 20.4 metres (67 ft)	4th - 8 reps	3rd - 3 in 40.57s	3rd - 5 in 53.79s	17.5
5	(United States) Jason Bergmann	6th - 3 in 45.83s	4th - 4 in 1m 15s	4th - 28.25s	5th - 5 reps	2nd - 3 in 36.07s	4th - 4 in 23.57s	16.5
6	(Finland) Juha Matti Järvi	5th - 4 in 73.37s	6th - 2 in 1m 15s	5th - 29.35s	6th - 0 reps	4th - 2 in 22.60s	5th - 3 in 33.29s	10.0

=== Heat 4 ===
- Loading Race: 4 sacks weighing 125 kilograms (276 lb). 1 minute 15 second time limit.
- Keg Toss: 8 kegs weighing between 18–25 kilograms (40–55 lb) over a 4 metres (13 ft) bar. 1 minute 15 second time limit.
- Squat Lift: 325 kilograms (717 lb). 1 minute 15 second time limit.
- Truck Pull: 12,000 kilograms (26,000 lb) down a 20 metres (66 ft) course. 1 minute 15 second time limit.
- Block Press: 4 blocks weighing between 110–150 kilograms (240–330 lb). 1 minute 30 second time limit.
- Atlas Stones: 5 stones weighing between 120–180 kilograms (260–400 lb). 1 minute 15 second time limit.

#	Name	Event 1 Loading Race	Event 2 Keg Toss	Event 3 Squat Lift	Event 4 Truck Pull	Event 5 Block Press	Event 6 Atlas Stones	Pts
1	(Lithuania) Žydrūnas Savickas	2nd - 4 in 44.57s	1st - 8 in 19.42s	1st - 7 reps	2nd - 1m 6s	1st - 4 in 1m 11.54s	1st - 5 in 26.85s	34
2	(United States) Mike Jenkins	1st - 4 in 40.98s	4th - 6 in 1m 15s	2nd - 6 reps	1st - 1m 0.13s	3rd - 3 in 27.77s	2nd - 5 in 29.39s	28
3	(Canada) Louis-Philippe Jean	4th - 4 in 63.48s	4th - 6 in 1m 15s	2nd - 6 reps	3rd - 17.9 metres (59 ft)	2nd - 3 in 25.46s	3rd - 5 in 29.48s	23
4	(United States) Josh Thigpen	3rd - 4 in 54.13s	2nd - 8 in 27.70s	5th - 2 reps	4th - 17.3 metres (57 ft)	4th - 3 in 33.43s	4th - 5 in 30.70s	20
5	(Russia) Alexander Klyushev	5th - 3 in 55.19s	3rd - 7 in 1m 15s	4th - 4 reps	6th - 3.25 metres (10.7 ft)	5th - 3 in 38.27s	6th - 3 in 30.25s	13
6	(England) Rob Frampton	6th - 2 in 32.16s	6th - 2 in 1m 15s	6th - 1 rep	5th - 14.89 metres (48.9 ft)	6th - 3 in 39.51s	5th - 3 in 26.04s	8

=== Heat 5 ===
- Loading Race: 4 sacks weighing 125 kilograms (276 lb). 1 minute 15 second time limit.
- Keg Toss: 8 kegs weighing between 18–25 kilograms (40–55 lb) over a 4 metres (13 ft) bar. 1 minute 15 second time limit.
- Car Walk: 450 kilograms (990 lb) down a 25 metres (82 ft) course. 1 minute 15 second time limit.
- Deadlift Hold: 370 kilograms (820 lb)
- Block Press: 4 blocks weighing between 110–150 kilograms (240–330 lb). 1 minute 30 second time limit.
- Atlas Stones: 5 stones weighing between 120–180 kilograms (260–400 lb). 1 minute 15 second time limit.

#	Name	Event 1 Loading Race	Event 2 Keg Toss	Event 3 Car Walk	Event 4 Deadlift Hold	Event 5 Block Press	Event 6 Atlas Stones	Pts
1	(United States) Derek Poundstone	1st - 4 in 38.57s	2nd - 8 in 28.41s	1st - 19.28s	5th - 50.21s	1st - 4 in 51.93s	2nd - 5 in 31.26s	30
2	(Iceland) Stefán Sölvi Pétursson	3rd - 4 in 44.98s	3rd - 8 in 33.13s	3rd - 22.79s	6th - 39.75s	3rd - 3 in 36.02s	1st - 5 in 29.72s	23
3	(England) Jack McIntosh	2nd - 4 in 43.73s	4th - 8 in 41.09s	6th - 14.4 metres (47 ft)	1st - 1m 19.49s	5th - 3 in 56.04s	3rd - 4 in 24.19s	21
4	(Poland) Krzysztof Radzikowski	5th - 4 in 1m 0.80s	1st - 8 in 27.49s	4th - 28.53s	3rd - 1m 3.41s	4th - 3 in 40.44s	4th - 4 in 27.38s	20.5
5	(Lithuania) Vidas Blekaitis	4th - 4 in 56.43s	5th - 4 in 1m 15s	2nd - 22.59s	4th - 52.43s	2nd - 3 in 20.02s	5th - 4 in 27.80s	19.5
6	(Fiji) Derek Boyer	5th - 4 in 1m 0.80s	5th - 4 in 1m 15s	5th - 38.94s	2nd - 1m 12.21s	6th - 0 in 1m 30s	Withdrew	10

== Finals events results ==
=== Event 1: Frame Carry ===
- Weight: 375 kilograms (827 lb)
- Course Length: 30 metres (98 ft)
- Time Limit: 1 Minute 15 seconds

#	Name	Nationality	Time (sec)	Event pts	Overall pts
1	Mike Jenkins	United States	18.10	10	10
2	Laurence Shahlaei	England	18.72	9	9
3	Stefán Sölvi Pétursson	Iceland	23.25	8	8
4	Brian Shaw	United States	27.13	7	7
5	Žydrūnas Savickas	Lithuania	41.28	6	6
6	Terry Hollands	England	28.5 metres (94 ft)	5	5
7	Vytautas Lalas	Lithuania	26.37 metres (86.5 ft)	4	4
8	Derek Poundstone	United States	16.6 metres (54 ft)	3	3
9	Ervin Katona	Serbia	13.15 metres (43.1 ft)	2	2
10	Hafþór Júlíus Björnsson	Iceland	3.5 metres (11 ft)	1	1

=== Event 2: Super Yoke ===
- Weight: 450 kilograms (990 lb)
- Course Length: 25 metres (82 ft)
- Time Limit: 1 Minute 15 seconds

#	Name	Nationality	Time (sec)	Event pts	Overall pts
1	Mike Jenkins	United States	14.26	10	20
2	Brian Shaw	United States	14.28	9	16
3	Terry Hollands	England	16.13	8	13
4	Laurence Shahlaei	England	16.29	7	16
5	Žydrūnas Savickas	Lithuania	16.33	6	12
6	Derek Poundstone	United States	19.16	5	8
7	Vytautas Lalas	Lithuania	20.37	4	8
8	Hafþór Júlíus Björnsson	Iceland	23.50	3	4
9	Stefán Sölvi Pétursson	Iceland	27.06	2	10
10	Ervin Katona	Serbia	0.26 metres (0.85 ft)	1	3

=== Event 3: Truck Pull ===
- Weight: 10,000 kilograms (22,000 lb)
- Course Length: 30 metres (98 ft)
- Time Limit: 1 Minute 15 seconds

#	Name	Nationality	Time	Event pts	Overall pts
1	Hafþór Júlíus Björnsson	Iceland	57.94	10	14
2	Brian Shaw	United States	1m 2.81s	9	25
3	Žydrūnas Savickas	Lithuania	1m 11.63s	8	20
4	Terry Hollands	England	28.52 metres (93.6 ft)	7	20
5	Laurence Shahlaei	England	27.8 metres (91 ft)	6	22
6	Derek Poundstone	United States	27.67 metres (90.8 ft)	5	13
7	Mike Jenkins	United States	22 metres (72 ft)	4	24
8	Vytautas Lalas	Lithuania	17.13 metres (56.2 ft)	3	11
9	Ervin Katona	Serbia	13 metres (43 ft)	2	5
10	Stefán Sölvi Pétursson	Iceland	12.22 metres (40.1 ft)	1	11

=== Event 4: Max Deadlift ===
#	Name	Nationality	Weight	Event pts	Overall pts
1	Žydrūnas Savickas	Lithuania	440 kilograms (970 lb)	10	30
2	Brian Shaw	United States	435 kilograms (959 lb)	8.5	33.5
2	Terry Hollands	England	435 kilograms (959 lb)	8.5	28.5
4	Laurence Shahlaei	England	415 kilograms (915 lb)	6.5	28.5
4	Derek Poundstone	United States	415 kilograms (915 lb)	6.5	19.5
6	Vytautas Lalas	Lithuania	400 kilograms (880 lb)	5	16
7	Hafþór Júlíus Björnsson	Iceland	370 kilograms (820 lb)	2.5	16.5
7	Mike Jenkins (Note: After this event Mike Jenkins withdrew from the competition and took no further part.)	United States	370 kilograms (820 lb)	2.5	26.5
7	Ervin Katona (Note: After this event Ervin Katona withdrew from the competition and took no further part.)	Serbia	370 kilograms (820 lb)	2.5	7.5
7	Stefán Sölvi Pétursson	Iceland	370 kilograms (820 lb)	2.5	13.5

=== Event 5: Log Lift ===
- Weight: 155 kilograms (342 lb)
- Time Limit: 1 Minute 15 seconds

#	Name	Nationality	Repetitions	Event pts	Overall pts
1	Žydrūnas Savickas	Lithuania	10	10	40
2	Derek Poundstone	United States	7	8.5	28
2	Vytautas Lalas	Lithuania	7	8.5	24.5
4	Brian Shaw	United States	5	6.5	40
4	Terry Hollands	England	5	6.5	35
6	Laurence Shahlaei	England	4	5	33.5
7	Hafþór Júlíus Björnsson	Iceland	3	4	20.5
8	Stefán Sölvi Pétursson	Iceland	2	3	16.5

=== Event 6: Atlas Stones ===
- Weight: 5 Stone series weighing 120–180 kilograms (260–400 lb)
- Time Limit: 1 Minute 15 seconds

#	Name	Nationality	Time (sec)	Event pts	Overall pts
1	Brian Shaw	United States	5 in 19.67	10	50
2	Hafþór Júlíus Björnsson	Iceland	5 in 24.35	9	29.5
3	Žydrūnas Savickas	Lithuania	5 in 26.20	8	48
4	Terry Hollands	England	5 in 26.77	7	42
5	Stefán Sölvi Pétursson	Iceland	5 in 27.46	6	22.5
6	Vytautas Lalas	Lithuania	5 in 38.99	5	29.5
7	Derek Poundstone	United States	4 in 17.32	4	32
8	Laurence Shahlaei	England	4 in 49.19	3	36.5

== Final standings ==
#	Name	Nationality	Pts
1st place, gold medalist(s)	Brian Shaw	United States	50
2nd place, silver medalist(s)	Žydrūnas Savickas	Lithuania	48
3rd place, bronze medalist(s)	Terry Hollands	England	42
4	Laurence Shahlaei	England	36.5
5	Derek Poundstone	United States	32
6	Hafþór Júlíus Björnsson	Iceland	29.5
7	Vytautas Lalas	Lithuania	29.5
8	Mike Jenkins	United States	26.5
9	Stefán Sölvi Pétursson	Iceland	22.5
10	Ervin Katona	Serbia	7.5

== Television broadcast ==
=== United States ===
In the US the event was broadcast on ESPN and ESPN2 on Sunday 1 January, with some repeat screenings from 14 January to 5 February.

=== United Kingdom ===
In the UK, the show returned on Channel 5 to screen both The Giants Live Tour (the official qualifying tour for The World's Strongest Man) as well as the finals after Bravo screened the show for two years. Giants Live was shown on four consecutive days from 20 December 2011 to 23 December 2011. The finals were broadcast on six consecutive days from 27 December 2011 to 1 January 2012, with each episode dedicated to a qualifying group, and the sixth episode being the final.

Preceded by 2010 World's Strongest Man	2011 World's Strongest Man	Succeeded by 2012 World's Strongest Man
