= Johnny Hansson =

Swedish strongman

Personal information
- Nationality: Swedish
- Born: 27 April 1989 (age 37)
- Occupation: Strongman
- Height: 6 ft 7 in (2.01 m)
- Weight: 165–170 kg (364–375 lb)
Medal record
Strongman
Representing Sweden
World's Strongest Man
Qualified	2018 World's Strongest Man
Qualified	2021 World's Strongest Man
Strongman Champions League
3rd	2016 SCL Latvia
Força Bruta
2nd	2017
2nd	2019
Sweden's Strongest Man
3rd	2015
4th	2016
3rd	2017
1st	2020
2nd	2022

Johnny Hansson (born 27 April 1989) is a Swedish Strongman from Värmland.

Hansson participated in his first Sweden's Strongest Man competition in 2015 where he won third place, and became the champion by 2020.

In his first appearance at World's Strongest Man competition in 2018 held in Manila, Philippines, he participated in the second qualifier group where Brian Shaw and Johan Els made it to the finals. In his second appearance in 2021 also he participated in the second qualifier group where Trey Mitchell and Tom Stoltman made it to the finals.

Hansson's career best performances came in 2017 Giants Live Scandinavian Open where he won second place behind Johannes Årsjö, while defeating Žydrūnas Savickas. He also won second twice at the Força Bruta competition in 2017 and 2019, and third in 2016 Strongman Champions League Latvia.

== Personal records ==
- Raw Deadlift (with straps) – 360 kg (794 lb) (2017 Sweden's Strongest Man)
- Log press – 190 kg (419 lb) ( 2020 Sweden's Strongest Man)
- Axle press – 175 kg (386 lb) (2021 Sweden's Strongest Man)
- Train push – 24,948 kg (55,001 lb) in a 20m course in 35.86 seconds (2021 World's Strongest Man, group 2) (World Record)
