= Strength athletics in Sweden =

Strength athletics in Sweden refers to the participation of Swedish competitors and holding national strongman competitions.

== History ==
Sweden has a long and rich history of strength athletics dating back to the mid 1900s in the sport of Olympic weightlifting with Bo Johansson in the 1960s and 1970s, and several top ranked IPF Powerlifters such as Lars Hedlund and Lars Norén during the 1980s. Sweden has been at the top international level in World's Strongest Man since the very beginning in the late 1970s with Lars Hedlund achieving numerous podium finishes. Sweden struggled through the 1980s and early 1990s until the arrival of Magnus Samuelsson in 1995. Samuelsson would go on to win the 1998 World's Strongest Man, Sweden's only WSM title. Magnus continued to win major international contests and be a top podium finisher at WSM until his retirement in 2008. In recent years, Johannes Årsjö has continued to maintain Sweden's top position on the international scene with numerous podium finishes at major international contests.

== National competitions ==
=== Sweden's Strongest Man ===
Sweden's Strongest Man
Tournament information
- Location: Sweden
- Established: 1995
- Format: Multi-event competition

Current champion
- (Sweden) Cim Johansson (2025)

Sweden's Strongest Man (Swedish: Sveriges Starkaste Man) is an annual Strongman competition held in Sweden and featuring exclusively Swedish athletes, to determine who the strongest Swede of the year is.

Magnus Samuelsson and Johannes Årsjö have both won the competition 9 times, thus sharing the record for most wins.

==== Champions breakdown ====
The competition has been held every year since 1995 and has produced ten champions over the years.

Year	Champion	Runner-up	3rd place
1995	(Sweden) Magnus Samuelsson	(Sweden) Jörgen Ljungberg	(To be confirmed)
1996	(Sweden) Magnus Samuelsson	(Sweden) Jorma Paananen	(Sweden) Torbjörn Samuelsson
1997	(Sweden) Magnus Samuelsson	(Sweden) Jörgen Ljungberg	(Sweden) Torbjörn Samuelsson
1998	(Sweden) Torbjörn Samuelsson	(Sweden) Jorma Paananen	(To be confirmed)
1999	(Sweden) Magnus Samuelsson	(Sweden) Jorma Paananen	(Sweden) Torbjörn Samuelsson
2000	(Sweden) Magnus Samuelsson	(Sweden) Torbjörn Samuelsson	(Sweden) Anders Johansson
2001	(Sweden) Magnus Samuelsson	(Sweden) Torbjörn Samuelsson	(Sweden) Anders Johansson
2002	(Sweden) Torbjörn Samuelsson	(Sweden) Anders Johansson	(Sweden) Jorma Paananen
2003	(Sweden) Magnus Samuelsson	(Sweden) Jörgen Ljungberg	(Sweden) Kalle Lane
2004	(Sweden) Magnus Samuelsson	(Sweden) Jörgen Ljungberg	(Sweden) Benny Wennberg
2005	(Sweden) Magnus Samuelsson	(Sweden) Anders Johansson	(Sweden) Robert Brolin
2006	(Sweden) Anders Johansson	(Sweden) Björn Andersson	(Sweden) Tomas Karlsson
2007	(Sweden) Anders Johansson	(Sweden) Stefan Bergqvist	(Sweden) Daniel Wiklund
2008	(Sweden) Anders Johansson	(Sweden) Peter Rundberg	(Sweden) Stefan Bergqvist
2009	(Sweden) Johannes Årsjö	(Sweden) Anders Johansson	(Sweden) Mikael Hoffner
2010	(Sweden) Johannes Årsjö	(Sweden) Stefan Bergqvist	(Sweden) Peter Rundberg
2011	(Sweden) Johannes Årsjö	(Sweden) Martin Forsmark	(Sweden) Stefan Bergqvist
2012	(Sweden) Johannes Årsjö	(Sweden) Sebastian Davidsson	(Sweden) Martin Forsmark
2013	(Sweden) Johannes Årsjö	(Sweden) Sebastian Davidsson	(Sweden) David Nyström
2014	(Sweden) Johannes Årsjö	(Sweden) Martin Forsmark	(Sweden) David Nyström
2015	(Sweden) Johannes Årsjö	(Sweden) Martin Forsmark	(Sweden) Johnny Hansson
2016	(Sweden) Johannes Årsjö	(Sweden) Martin Forsmark	(Sweden) Joachim Gustavsson
2017	(Sweden) Johannes Årsjö	(Sweden) Martin Forsmark	(Sweden) Johnny Hansson
2018	(Sweden) Martin Forsmark	(Sweden) Torbjörn Persson	(Sweden) Johan Espenkrona
2019	(Sweden) Martin Forsmark	(Sweden) Andreas Ståhlberg	(Sweden) Johan Espenkrona
2020	(Sweden) Johnny Hansson	(Sweden) Martin Forsmark	(Sweden) Fredrik Svensson
2021	(Sweden) Marcus Yngvesson	(Sweden) Johan Espenkrona	(Sweden) Fredrik Svensson
2022	(Sweden) Andreas Ståhlberg	(Sweden) Johnny Hansson	(Sweden) Joachim Kvick
2023	(Sweden) Fredrik Johansson	(Sweden) Marcus Yngvesson	(Sweden) Cim Johansson
2024	(Sweden) Fredrik Johansson	(Sweden) Cim Johansson	(Sweden) Marcus Yngvesson
2025	(Sweden) Cim Johansson	(Sweden) Jacob Larsson	(Sweden) Harley Andersson

==== Repeat champions ====
Champion	Times & years
(Sweden) Magnus Samuelsson	9 (1995, 1996, 1997, 1999, 2000, 2001, 2003, 2004, 2005)
(Sweden) Johannes Årsjö	9 (2009, 2010, 2011, 2012, 2013, 2014, 2015, 2016, 2017)
(Sweden) Anders Johansson	3 (2006, 2007, 2008)
(Sweden) Torbjörn Samuelsson	2 (1998, 2002)
(Sweden) Martin Forsmark	2 (2018, 2019)
(Sweden) Fredrik Johansson	2 (2023, 2024)

== Regional Competitions ==
=== Nordic Strongman Championships ===
Nordic Strongman Championships consists of athletes from Iceland, Norway, Sweden, Finland and Denmark.

Year	Champion	Runner-Up	3rd Place
2005	(Norway) Svend Karlsen	(Sweden) Magnus Samuelsson	(Finland) Juha-Matti Räsänen
2012	(Sweden) Johannes Årsjö	(Norway) Lars Rorbakken	(Denmark) Mikkel Leicht
2013	(Sweden) Johannes Årsjö	(Norway) Ole Martin Hansen	(Finland) Juha-Matti Järvi

- In 2005, the competition was held under IFSA in Kristiansand, and in 2012 and 2013 in Harstad, Norway under Giants Live.
- From 2014 onwards, the competition was promoted to global level, re-titled as the World's Strongest Viking and was held consecutively for 8 years under Strongman Champions League.

== International Competitions ==
=== Giants Live ===
Sweden was also the venue for several Giants Live grand prix competitions with the participation of top athletes of the world. The competitions were named Giants Live Sweden/ Scandinavian Open.

Year	Champion	Runner-Up	3rd Place
2014	(United States) Brian Shaw	(Sweden) Johannes Årsjö	(Sweden) Martin Forsmark
2015	(Iceland) Hafþór Júlíus Björnsson	(Sweden) Johannes Årsjö	(United Kingdom) Mark Felix
2016	(Sweden) Johannes Årsjö	(Sweden) Martin Forsmark	(United Kingdom) Mark Felix
2017	(Sweden) Johannes Årsjö	(Sweden) Johnny Hansson	(Lithuania) Žydrūnas Savickas
