= Manfred Hoeberl =

Austrian strength athlete

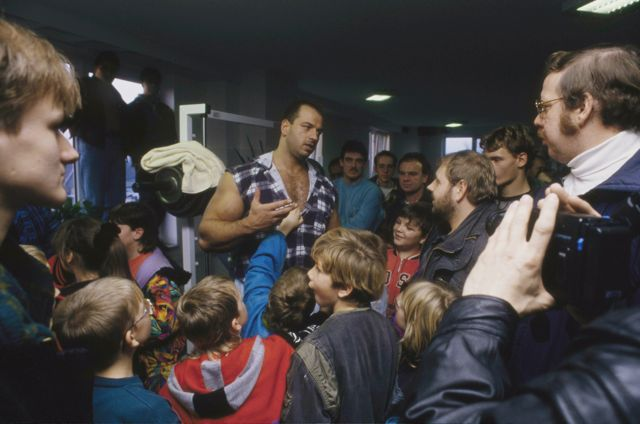
- Born: Manfred Hoeberl; 12 May 1964 (age 61); Graz, Austria
- Occupation: Strongman Powerlifter
- Height: 6 ft 4 in (1.93 m)
- Title: 7× Austria's Strongest Man; 2× Europe's Strongest Man

Competition record

Strongman

Representing Austria

World's Strongest Man
8th	1991 World's Strongest Man	
4th	1993 World's Strongest Man	
2nd	1994 World's Strongest Man	

Europe's Strongest Man
1st	1993	
1st	1994	

European Hercules
3rd	1993	
2nd	1994	
10th	1997	

World Strongman Challenge
2nd	1994	
3rd	1996	

Austria's Strongest Man
1st	1989	
1st	1990	
1st	1991	
1st	1992	
1st	1993	
1st	1994	
1st	1996	

World's Strongest Team
6th	1997	

European Muscle Power Championships
1st	1993	
1st	1994	

World Muscle Power Championships
1st	1993	
1st	1994	

Strongest Man on Earth
1st	1994	

World Mighty Man
5th	1992	
4th	1993	

Manfred Hoeberl (German: [ˈmanfrɛt ˈhøːbɐl]; born 12 May 1964) is an Austrian former strongman, powerlifter and bodybuilder. He was famous for having the largest muscular arms in the world during early to mid 1990s.

Having competed in 18 International strongman competitions and winning 6 of them, Hoeberl is among the 50 most decorated strongmen of all time. He also participated in numerous Highland games. He was born in the same town as bodybuilding legend and former Governor of California, Arnold Schwarzenegger.

== Life and career ==
Hoeberl won the Europe's Strongest Man twice (1993, 1994), the World Muscle Power Classic twice (1993, 1994) and was runner up at the 1994 World's Strongest Man competition, narrowly missing the title to Magnús Ver Magnússon by 0.87 seconds in the final Atlas Stones event. Hoeberl competed in the World's Strongest Man finals in 1991 and 1993, finishing 8th and 4th respectively.

Hoeberl won Austria's Strongest Man 7 times, from 1989-1994 & 1996.

In the early 1990s Hoeberl claimed to have the largest arms in the world. At the 1994 Arnold Schwarzenegger Classic, bodybuilding journalist Joe Roark measured Hoeberl's upper arm to be 25.75 inches (65.4 cm) cold. Right after Hoeberl curled a 150 lb. dumbbell for several reps and was re-measured at 26 inches (66 cm) pumped. After the measurement Roark claimed Hoeberl was the first man in history to have an upper arm girth three times the size of his wrist circumference.

Shortly after this, Hoeberl co-wrote his first book 10 Minutes to Massive Arms.

Hoeberl was officially certified on the No. 3 Captains of Crush gripper in 1997 and was famous for his world class grip strength.

== Personal records ==
In competitions:

- Silver Dollar Deadlift – 390 kg (860 lb) raw (1994 World's Strongest Man)
- Log press (with vintage irregular V.2 log) – 175 kg (386 lb) (1992 World Mighty Man) (Former World Record)
- Leviathan Press (incline log press) – 110 kg (243 lb) x 19 reps (1993 World's Strongest Man)
- Leviathan Press (incline log press) – 100 kg (220 lb) x 25 reps (1993 World Muscle Power Classic) (World Record)
- Rock press – 120 kg (265 lb) (1994 Strongest Man on Earth)
- Weight over bar – 25.5 kg (56 lb) over 5.60 metres (18 ft 4 in) (1994 World Strongman Challenge) (Former World Record)
- Stone block throw (Trojan wall) – 20 kg (44 lb) over 5.60 metres (18 ft 4 in) (1993 World's Strongest Man) (World Record)
- Truck pull – 7,000 kg (15,432 lb) + (4 x 55 drum barrels) for 20 metres in 24.60 seconds (1993 World's Strongest Man)

During training:

- Barbell curl – Close to 200 kg (441 lb) for a max according to Manfred himself.

→ During training he often performed 68 kg (150 lb) for sets of 12 reps at the end of biceps training, after 8 rep sets with 75 kg (165 lb) seated cable curls and 50 kg (110 lb) seated dumbbell curls

- Captains of Crush – No. 3 gripper (127 kg (280 lb)/ RGC 149 of pressure))

→ Hoeberl is the 9th man and the first non-American to get certified on this gripper

- Bench press – 285 kg (628 lb) raw
- Squat – 360 kg (794 lb) raw

== Physical stats ==
- Height – 1.93 metres (6 ft 4 in)
- Weight – 135–145 kg (298–320 lb)
- Upper Arm – 25.75 in (65.4 cm) cold, 26 in (66.0 cm) pumped
- Forearm – 17.5 in (44.5 cm) goose-necked at right angle to upper arm
- Wrist – 8.37 in (21.3 cm)

== Car crashes and retirement ==
Shortly after the 1994 World's Strongest Man contest, Hoeberl was involved in a near fatal car crash in which he broke several limbs, and fractured his hip in 8 places. After months of rehabilitation, Hoeberl returned to strongman competition, although he never again competed in the World's Strongest Man. A severe biceps injury sustained during the 1997 European Hercules contest forced him into retirement.

Hoeberl was involved in a second near fatal crash in 2002. Hoeberl was involved in a head-on collision with a truck while riding a motorcycle at 80 miles per hour (130 km/h). Due to his injuries Hoeberl is no longer weight training, he is quoted as saying, “I am kinda lucky to be alive.”
