= 2020 Europe's Strongest Man =

Strongman competition in Harrogate, England

Competition information
- Dates: 5-6 September 2020
- Venue: Allerton Castle
- Location: Harrogate
- Country: United Kingdom
- Athletes participating: 12 (Day 1); 9 (Day 2)
- Nations participating: 5 (Day 1); 4 (Day 2)

Champion(s)
- (United Kingdom) Luke Richardson

The 2020 Europe's Strongest Man was a strongman competition that took place in Harrogate, England from 5–6 September 2020 at the Allerton Castle. This event was held behind closed door due to the COVID-19 pandemic.

Defending champion Hafþór Júlíus Björnsson did not defend his title as in August 2020 he announced his retirement from the sport of strongman. Europe's Strongest Man debutant Luke Richardson won the event, with this being his first major strongman competition victory.

== Participants ==
- Graham Hicks (UK)
- Aaron Page (UK)
- Jack Forgasc (HUN)
- Pa O'Dwyer (IRL)
- Alex Lungu (ROU)
- Luke Richardson (UK)
- Adam Bishop (UK)
- Ervin Toots (EST)
- Gavin Bilton (UK)
- Paul Benton (UK)
- Mark Felix (UK)
- Terry Hollands (UK)

== Results of events ==
=== Event 1: Max Log Lift ===
#	Athlete	Nation	Weight	Event Points	Overall Points
1	Graham Hicks (Note: Graham Hicks's lift of 220 kilograms (490 lb) was a British record.)	United Kingdom	220 kilograms (490 lb)	12	12
2	Aaron Page	United Kingdom	180 kilograms (400 lb)	9.5	9.5
2	Jack Forgasc	Hungary	180 kilograms (400 lb)	9.5	9.5
2	Pa O'Dwyer	Ireland	180 kilograms (400 lb)	9.5	9.5
2	Alex Lungu	Romania	180 kilograms (400 lb)	9.5	9.5
6	Luke Richardson	United Kingdom	170 kilograms (370 lb)	5.5	5.5
6	Adam Bishop	United Kingdom	170 kilograms (370 lb)	5.5	5.5
6	Ervin Toots	Estonia	170 kilograms (370 lb)	5.5	5.5
6	Gavin Bilton	United Kingdom	170 kilograms (370 lb)	5.5	5.5
10	Paul Benton	United Kingdom	150 kilograms (330 lb)	3	3
—	Mark Felix	United Kingdom	N/A	0	0
—	Terry Hollands	United Kingdom	N/A	0	0

=== Event 2: Hercules Hold ===
- Athlete must stand between and hold on to 160 kilograms (350 lb) pillars for as long as possible.

#	Athlete	Nation	Time	Event Points	Overall Points
1	Mark Felix (Note: Mark Felix's time of 1:32.37 is a new World Record.)	United Kingdom	1:32.37	12	12
2	Terry Hollands	United Kingdom	1:19.88	11	11
3	Luke Richardson	United Kingdom	1:14.48	10	15.5
4	Gavin Bilton	United Kingdom	59.53	9	14.5
5	Paul Benton	United Kingdom	53.71	8	11
6	Aaron Page	United Kingdom	50.74	7	16.5
7	Adam Bishop	United Kingdom	50.55	6	11.5
8	Jack Forgasc	Hungary	40.27	5	14.5
9	Pa O'Dwyer	Ireland	40.11	4	13.5
10	Ervin Toots	Estonia	38.91	3	8.5
11	Alex Lungu	Romania	37.61	2	11.5
12	Graham Hicks	United Kingdom	35.60	1	13

=== Event 3: Hammer Hold ===
- Athlete must stand straight and front hold a 35 kilograms (77 lb) hammer for as long as possible.

#	Athlete	Nation	Time	Event Points	Overall Points
1	Luke Richardson	United Kingdom	48.41	12	27.5
2	Graham Hicks	United Kingdom	48.12	11	24
3	Jack Forgasc	Hungary	46.61	10	24.5
4	Mark Felix	United Kingdom	43.53	9	21
5	Adam Bishop	United Kingdom	40.87	8	19.5
6	Ervin Toots	Estonia	40.53	7	15.5
7	Gavin Bilton	United Kingdom	39.72	6	20.5
8	Aaron Page	United Kingdom	38.63	5	21.5
9	Pa O'Dwyer	Ireland	35.63	4	17.5
10	Paul Benton	United Kingdom	34.63	3	14
11	Terry Hollands	United Kingdom	34.05	2	13
12	Alex Lungu	Romania	27.07	1	12.5

=== Event 4: Loading Race ===
- 1 x 120 kilograms (265 lb) anchor, 1 x 150 kilograms (331 lb) barrel, 1 x 150 kilograms (331 lb) sack and 1 x 120 kilograms (265 lb) tire.

#	Athlete	Nation	Time	Event Points	Overall Points
1	Adam Bishop	United Kingdom	4 in 36.90	12	31.5
2	Ervin Toots	Estonia	4 in 38.00	11	26.5
3	Luke Richardson	United Kingdom	4 in 38.35	10	37.5
4	Paul Benton	United Kingdom	4 in 39.81	9	23
5	Pa O'Dwyer	Ireland	4 in 40.76	8	25.5
6	Mark Felix	United Kingdom	4 in 46.14	7	28
7	Aaron Page	United Kingdom	4 in 46.72	6	27.5
8	Gavin Bilton	United Kingdom	4 in 49.27	5	25.5
9	Graham Hicks	United Kingdom	4 in 53.51	4	28
10	Jack Forgasc	Hungary	4 in 1:10.56	3	27.5
11	Terry Hollands	United Kingdom	2 in 21.28	2	15
12	Alex Lungu	Romania	2 in 50.43	1	13.5

=== Event 5: Deadlift ===
- Weight: 350 kilograms (770 lb) for as many repetitions as possible.
- Time Limit: 60 seconds
- Notes: This event was completed on an axle bar.
- The athletes that finished at the last 3 places at the end of day 1 (Paul Benton, Terry Hollands and Alex Lungu) were elimated from the rest of the competition.

#	Athlete	Nation	Repetitions	Event Points	Overall Points
1	Luke Richardson	United Kingdom	5	8	45.5
1	Adam Bishop	United Kingdom	5	8	39.5
1	Graham Hicks	United Kingdom	5	8	36
4	Mark Felix	United Kingdom	3	6	34
5	Aaron Page	United Kingdom	2	5	32.5
6	Ervin Toots	Estonia	1	3	29.5
6	Pa O'Dwyer	Ireland	1	3	28.5
6	Gavin Bilton	United Kingdom	1	3	28.5
9	Jack Forgasc	Hungary	0	0	27.5

=== Event 6: Stone Press ===
- Weight: 100 kilograms (220 lb) atlas stone for as many repetitions as possible.
- Time Limit 75 seconds.

#	Athlete	Nation	Repetitions	Event Points	Overall Points
1	Aaron Page	United Kingdom	7	8.5	41
1	Ervin Toots	Estonia	7	8.5	38
3	Pa O'Dwyer	Ireland	6	6.5	35
3	Jack Forgasc	Hungary	6	6.5	34
5	Adam Bishop	United Kingdom	4	4.5	44
5	Gavin Bilton	United Kingdom	4	4.5	33
7	Luke Richardson	United Kingdom	3	2.5	48
7	Graham Hicks	United Kingdom	3	2.5	38.5
9	Mark Felix	United Kingdom	0	0	34

=== Event 7: Nicol Stones Carry ===
- Weight: 138 kilograms (304 lb) stone on the right hand and 114 kilograms (251 lb) stone on the left hand for longest distance.
- Athletes get 10 seconds for a second pick-up after dropping the stones for the first time.

#	Athlete	Nation	Distance	Event Points	Overall Points
1	Adam Bishop	United Kingdom	17.32	9	53
2	Mark Felix	United Kingdom	17.10	8	42
3	Pa O'Dwyer	Ireland	10.93	7	42
4	Ervin Toots	Estonia	9.85	6	44
5	Luke Richardson	United Kingdom	9.71	5	53
6	Gavin Bilton	United Kingdom	7.88	4	37
7	Graham Hicks	United Kingdom	7.82	3	41.5
8	Aaron Page	United Kingdom	6.76	2	43
9	Jack Forgasc	Hungary	2.33	1	35

=== Event 8: Keg Toss ===
#	Athlete	Nation	Time	Event Points	Overall Points
1	Adam Bishop	United Kingdom	8 in 36.04	9	62
2	Ervin Toots	Estonia	8 in 41.29	8	52
3	Luke Richardson	United Kingdom	8 in 47.62	7	60
4	Gavin Bilton	United Kingdom	8 in 55.80	6	43
5	Graham Hicks	United Kingdom	6 in 25.21	5	46.5
6	Aaron Page	United Kingdom	6 in 40.44	4	47
7	Pa O'Dwyer	Ireland	6 in 59.10	3	45
8	Jack Forgasc	Hungary	2 in 14.00	2	37
9	Mark Felix	United Kingdom	2 in 18.49	1	43

=== Event 9: Atlas Stones ===
- Weight: 5 stone series ranging from 100–180 kilograms (220–400 lb).

#	Athlete	Nation	Time	Event Points	Overall Points
1	Luke Richardson	United Kingdom	5 in 19.44	9	69
2	Graham Hicks	United Kingdom	5 in 20.08	8	54.5
3	Aaron Page	United Kingdom	5 in 20.73	7	54
4	Mark Felix	United Kingdom	5 in 23.28	6	49
5	Ervin Toots	Estonia	5 in 23.69	5	57
6	Pa O'Dwyer	Ireland	5 in 23.87	4	49
7	Gavin Bilton	United Kingdom	5 in 24.89	3	46
8	Adam Bishop	United Kingdom	5 in 25.08	2	64
9	Jack Forgasc	Hungary	5 in 55.41	1	38

== Final results ==
#	Athlete	Nation	Points
1st place, gold medalist(s)	Luke Richardson	United Kingdom	69
2nd place, silver medalist(s)	Adam Bishop	United Kingdom	64
3rd place, bronze medalist(s)	Ervin Toots	Estonia	57
4	Graham Hicks	United Kingdom	54.5
5	Aaron Page	United Kingdom	54
6	Mark Felix	United Kingdom	49
6	Pa O'Dwyer	Ireland	49
8	Gavin Bilton	United Kingdom	46
9	Jack Forgasc	Hungary	38
10	Paul Benton	United Kingdom	23
11	Terry Hollands	United Kingdom	15
12	Alex Lungu	Romania	13.5

Preceded by 2019 Europe's Strongest Man	Europe's Strongest Man	Succeeded by 2021 Europe's Strongest Man
