= Jack McIntosh (strongman) =

British strongman competitor (born 1988)

Personal information
- Born: 23 August 1988 (age 37) Kirkby Stephen, England
- Occupation: Strongman
- Height: 6 ft 4 in (1.93 m)
Medal record
Strongman
Representing United Kingdom
World's Strongest Man
Qualified	2011 World's Strongest Man
Qualified	2012 World's Strongest Man
Giants Live
2nd	2012 Hungary
Strongman Champions League
Clash of the Giants (UK)
2nd	Clash of the Giants (UK) 2011
Chiltern's Strongest Man
1st	2010

Jack McIntosh (born 23 August 1988) is a British strongman competitor, who was the youngest competitor at the 2011 World's Strongest Man.

== Early life ==
Jack McIntosh was born 23 August 1988 in the north of England. In 2007, after moving with his family from Kirkby Stephen to Sedgwick, he started cycling and going to the gym more regularly and in the process lost around 5 stone in weight.

== Strongman career ==
Jack McIntosh began focusing his training on strength athletics in 2007 after seeing a strongest man show in Lancaster. At 19, he entered his first show in Manchester, where he finished second. He began to make his name in 2009 after the Winter Giants competition where, despite finishing last, he won the award for the "One to Watch".

In 2010, he journeyed to Sun City, South Africa to be a stagehand at the 2010 World's Strongest Man. A year later, he gained his invitation to the World's Strongest Man competition, having come second in the Clash of the Giants contest held in July 2011 in Boroughbridge, England. McIntosh won two of the events in his heat but, hampered by a knee injury, he did not place in the top two of his group and therefore did not progress to the final.

=== Personal records ===
- Deadlift hold – 410 kg (904 lb) for 89.49 seconds (2011 World's Strongest Man, group 5) (World Record)
