= Austria's Strongest Man =

Tournament information
- Location: Austria, various locations
- Established: 1989
- Format: Multi-event competition

Current champion
- (Austria) Martin Hinteregger

Austria's Strongest Man is an annual strongman contest consisting of exclusively Austrian strength athletes. The event was established in 1989, the inaugural winner was Manfred Hoeberl who would go on to win the title a total of 7 times. His record was equaled by Martin Wildauer who also won the title 7 times.

The title and winners often creates confusion as different sources provide different results, specially between 1992 and 2005, and the titles also coinciding with that of other competitions: Austrian Summer Giants and Austrian Winter Giants in addition to be governed by two different federations: Austrian Strongman Federation and Catch Wrestling Association.

== Champions breakdown ==
Year	Champion	Runner-up	3rd place	Remarks
1989	(Austria) Manfred Hoeberl			
1990	(Austria) Manfred Hoeberl			
1991	(Austria) Manfred Hoeberl			
1992	(Austria) Manfred Hoeberl			(As per David Horne)
1992	(Austria) Karl Saliger	(Austria) Leopold Krendl	(Austria) August Smisl	(As per Strength Results)
1993	(Austria) Manfred Hoeberl			(As per David Horne)
1993	(Austria) Karl Saliger	(Austria) August Smisl	(Austria) Leopold Krendl	(As per Strength Results)
1994	(Austria) Manfred Hoeberl			(As per David Horne)
1994	(Austria) Karl Saliger	(Austria) Franz Siller	(Austria) Anton Tucek	(As per Strength Results)
1995	(Austria) Karl Saliger	(Austria) August Smisl	(Austria) Franz Siller	
1996	(Austria) Manfred Hoeberl			(As per David Horne)
1996	(Austria) August Smisl	(Austria) Manfred Gruber	(Austria) Christian Gärtner	(As per Strength Results)
1997	(Austria) Franz Siller	(Austria) Manfred Gruber	(Austria) Karl Bauer	
1998	(Austria) Ralf Ber			(As per David Horne)
1998	(Austria) Franz Siller	(Austria) Karl Bauer	(Austria) Oliver Gratzer	(As per Strength Results)
1999	(Austria) Karl Bauer	(Austria) Manfred Gruber	(Austria) Ralf Ber	
2000	(Austria) Bernd Kerschbaumer	(Austria) Manfred Gruber	(Austria) Hubert Dorer	
2001	(Austria) Ralf Ber	(Austria) Bernd Kerschbaumer	(Austria) Franz Mullner	
2002	(Austria) Hubert Dorer			(As per David Horne)
2002	(Austria) Bernd Kerschbaumer	(Austria) Markus Stark	(Austria) Karl Bauer	(As per Strength Results)
2003	(Austria) Ralf Ber			(As per David Horne)
2003	(Austria) Franz Mullner	(Austria) Bernd Kerschbaumer	(Austria) Markus Stark	(As per Strength Results)
2004	(Austria) Ralf Ber			(As per David Horne)
2004	(Austria) Franz Mullner	(Austria) Bernd Kerschbaumer	(Austria) Oliver Gratzer	(As per Strength Results)
2005	(Austria) Franz Mullner			(As per David Horne)
2005	(Austria) Bernd Kerschbaumer	(Austria) Oliver Gratzer	(Austria) Stefan Weiermann	(As per Strength Results)
2006	(Austria) Bernd Kerschbaumer	(Austria) Stefan Weiermann	(Austria) Wolfgang Kriechbaum	
2007	(Austria) Bernd Kerschbaumer	(Austria) Oliver Gratzer	(Austria) Wolfgang Kriechbaum	
2008	(Slovenia) Gregor Stegnar	(Austria) Bernd Kerschbaumer	(Austria) Martin Wildauer	
2009	(Austria) Martin Wildauer	(Austria) Gerhard Trawöger	(Austria) Michael Votter	
2010	(Austria) Martin Wildauer	(Austria) Alexander Meyer	(Austria) Michael Votter	
2011	(Austria) Martin Wildauer	(Austria) Gerhard Trawöger	(Austria) Erwin Geisler	
2012	(Austria) Martin Wildauer	(Austria) Michael Votter	(Austria) Alexander Meyer	
2013	(Austria) Martin Wildauer	(Austria) Alexander Meyer	(Austria) Thomas Wanek	
2014	(Austria) Michael Votter	(Austria) Manuel Comper	(Austria) Erwin Geisler	
2015 ASF	(Austria) Nemanja Tasic	(Austria) Manuel Comper	(Austria) Michael Votter	
2015 CWA	(Austria) Michael Votter	(Austria) Manuel Comper	(Austria) Nemanja Tasic	
2016 ASF	(Austria) Martin Wildauer	(Austria) Michael Votter	(Austria) Nemanja Tasic	
2016 CWA	(Austria) Michael Votter	(Austria) Manuel Comper	(Austria) Oliver Hanschek-Wagner	
2017	(Austria) Martin Wildauer	(Austria) Ronald Knoll	(Austria) Emanuel Pescari	
2018	(Austria) Michael Votter	(Austria) Oliver Hanschek-Wagner	(Austria) Emanuel Pescari	
2019	(Slovenia) Matjaz Belsak	(Austria) Nemanja Tasic	(Austria) Peter Reinthaler	
2020–2021	Event not held			
2022	(Austria) Emanuel Pescari	(Austria) Samuel Hausberger	(Austria) Peter Reinthaler	
2023	(Austria) Emanuel Pescari	(Austria) Samuel Hausberger	(Austria) Peter Reinthaler	
2024	(Austria) Jan Trettenbrein	(Austria) Maximilian Fleck	(Austria) Stefan Larch	
2025	(Austria) Thomas Glatzl	(Austria) Maximilian Fleck	(Austria) Florian Fuchsluger	
2026	(Austria) Martin Hinteregger	(Austria) Davor Pushov	(Austria) Martin Riss	
