= David Nyström (strongman) =

Swedish strongman

Personal information
- Nationality: Swedish
- Born: 20 September 1983 (age 42)
- Occupation: Strongman
- Height: 5 ft 11 in (1.80 m)
- Weight: 120–130 kg (265–287 lb)
Medal record
Strongman
Representing Sweden
World's Strongest Man
Qualified	2015 World's Strongest Man
World's Strongest Viking
2nd	2014 World's Strongest Viking
7th	2015 World's Strongest Viking
Sweden's Strongest Man
5th	2012
3rd	2013
3rd	2014

David Nyström (born 20 September 1983) is a Swedish Strongman and Powerlifter from Kiruna.

Nyström started his athletic career as a Powerlifter in 2011 and by 2012, was totaling 800 kg (1,764 lb) raw in the 120 kg (265 lb) weight class. In the same year, he participated in his first Sweden's Strongest Man competition where he emerged fifth. Ensuing years, he won third place twice and got qualified to 2014 World's Strongest Viking competition held in Vinstra, Norway where he won second place only behind Hafþór Júlíus Björnsson, while defeating the likes of Terry Hollands, Rauno Heinla and Bjørn Andre Solvang.

In his first and only appearance at World's Strongest Man competition in 2015 held in Putrajaya, Malaysia, he battled out at the third qualifier group alongwith Žydrūnas Savickas, Mikhail Shivlyakov, Nick Best, Benedikt Magnússon and Laurence Shahlaei.

== Personal records ==
- Raw Deadlift (with straps) – 370 kg (816 lb) (2014 Sweden's Strongest Man)
- Raw Squat (with sleeves) – 302.5 kg (667 lb) (2012 IPF World Classic Powerlifting Cup)
- Log press – 207.5 kg (457 lb) (2015 Swedish Log Lift Championships) (Swedish Record)
- Log press (for reps) – 130 kg (287 lb) x 10 reps (2014 World's Strongest Viking)
- Viking sword front hold – 27 kg (60 lb) for 93.01 seconds (2014 World's Strongest Viking) (World Record)
