= Torbjörn Samuelsson =

Swedish strongman

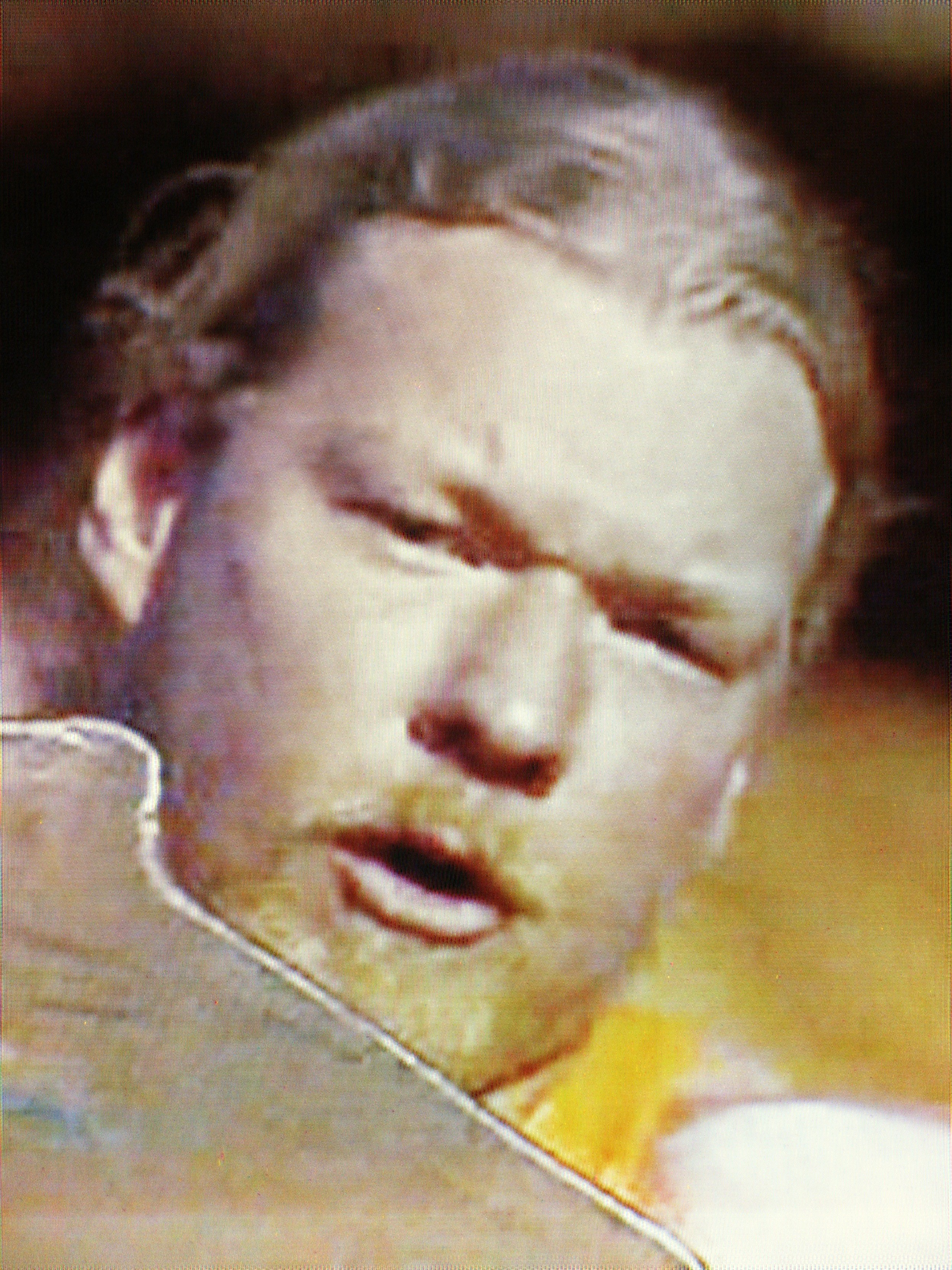

Personal information
- Born: Torbjörn Samuelsson; 6 June 1974 (age 52) Sweden
- Occupation: Strongman
- Height: 193 cm (6 ft 4 in)
Medal record
Strongman
Representing Sweden
World's Strongest Man
Qualified	2000 World's Strongest Man
Qualified	2001 World's Strongest Man
Qualified	2002 World's Strongest Man
Sweden's Strongest Man
3rd	1996
3rd	1997
1st	1998
3rd	1999
2nd	2000
2nd	2001
1st	2002

Torbjörn Samuelsson (born 1973) is a strongman competitor from Sweden, and is the younger brother of 1998 World's Strongest Man winner Magnus Samuelsson. Torbjörn is a two-time winner of Sweden's Strongest Man in 1998 & 2002. Torbjörn competed in the 2000, 2001 and 2002 World's Strongest Man competitions, but never qualified for the finals.
