= Paul Pîrjol =

Romanian weightlifter (born 1990)

Personal information
- Born: Paul Pîrjol; October 29, 1990 (age 35) Bucharest, Romania
- Occupation: Strongman
- Height: 1.80 m (5 ft 11 in)
Medal record
Representing Romania
Strongman Super Series
7th	Bucharest, Romania	2009
9th	Gol, Norway	2010
Giants Live
5th	Istanbul, Turkey	2010
4th	Poltava, Ukraine	2011
Romania's Strongest Man
1st	2009
1st	2010
1st	2011

Paul Pîrjol (born 29 October 1990) is a Romanian former weightlifter, amateur boxer and armwrestler, and currently professional strongman competitor and entrant to the World's Strongest Man competition. He is the son of Mircea (another strongman and former national bodybuilding champion) and Mirela Pîrjol, a two-time World Champion armwrestler.

== Biography ==
Pîrjol was three time Romania's Strongest Man in 2009, 2010 and 2011.

He then went on to compete internationally at the age of seventeen and a couple of years later his progression has culminated in a 2011 World's Strongest Man invitation.

== Personal Records ==
- Deadlift – 330 kilograms (730 lb)
