= 2012 World's Strongest Man =

Strongman competition in 2012

Competition information
- Dates: 24 September - 1 October 2012
- Venue: Commerce Casino
- Location: Los Angeles, California
- Country: United States
- Athletes participating: 30
- Nations participating: 17

Champion(s)
- (Lithuania) Žydrūnas Savickas

The 2012 World's Strongest Man was the 35th edition of World's Strongest Man. The event was held on the grounds of the Commerce Casino in Los Angeles, California, US. The event was sponsored by MET-Rx. The qualifying heats were held from September 24–27, and the finals took place Sept. 30 & Oct. 1, 2012. The winner was Žydrūnas Savickas, it was his third WSM title. Vytautas Lalas of Lithuania was second, and Iceland's Hafþór Júlíus Björnsson was third.

In the qualifying heats, Derek Poundstone set a new world record in the Giant Dumbbell press event by pressing a 210 lb (95 kg) dumbbell overhead for 11 repetitions, and Vytautas Lalas set a new strongman squat world record by squatting 700 lb (320 kg) for 11 repetitions. In the finals, Žydrūnas Savickas set a new Log Lift for Max Weight world record with a lift of 220 kg (490 lb).

== Participants ==
- Žydrūnas Savickas (Lithuania)
- Jean-François Caron (Canada)
- Derek Poundstone (United States)
- Mateusz Baron (Poland)
- Jack McIntosh (England)
- Frankie Scheun (South Africa)
- Hafþór Júlíus Björnsson (Iceland)
- Mike Jenkins (United States)
- Nick Best (United States)
- Eddie Hall (England)
- Sebastian Kurek (Poland)
- Akos Nagy (Hungary)
- Brian Shaw (United States)
- Johannes Årsjö (Sweden)
- Martin Wildauer (Austria)
- Mikhail Koklyaev (Russia)
- Lauri Nami (Estonia)
- Chris Gearing (England)
- Vytautas Lalas (Lithuania)
- Ervin Katona (Serbia)
- Louis Philippe Jean (Canada)
- Jerry Pritchett (United States)
- Graham Hicks (England)
- Ole Martin Hansen (Norway)
- Terry Hollands (England)
- Krzysztof Radzikowski (Poland)
- Mike Burke (United States)
- Alex Moonen (Netherlands)
- James Fennelly (Republic of Ireland)
- Eben Le Roux (Australia)

== Heat results ==
=== Heat 1 ===
- Events: loading, truck pull, giant dumbbell for reps, car deadlift for reps, keg toss, atlas stones

#	Name	Nationality	Pts
1	Žydrūnas Savickas	Lithuania	31.5
2	Jean-François Caron	Canada	29
3	Derek Poundstone	United States	27.5
4	Mateusz Baron	Poland	15
5	Jack McIntosh	England	13
6	Frankie Scheun	South Africa	10

=== Heat 2 ===
- Events: loading, truck pull, viking press for reps, super yoke, squat, atlas stones

#	Name	Nationality	Pts
1	Hafþór Júlíus Björnsson	Iceland	29.5
2	Mike Jenkins	United States	26
3	Nick Best	United States	21
4	Eddie Hall	England	19
5	Sebastian Kurek	Poland	15
6	Akos Nagy	Hungary	13.5

=== Heat 3 ===
- Events: loading, limo pull, giant dumbbell for reps, car deadlift for reps, keg toss, atlas stones

#	Name	Nationality	Pts
1	Brian Shaw	United States	27.5
2	Johannes Årsjö	Sweden	27
3	Martin Wildauer	Austria	23.5
4	Mikhail Koklyaev	Russia	22
5	Lauri Nami	Estonia	16
6	Chris Gearing	England	10

=== Heat 4 ===
- Events: loading, limo pull, viking press for reps, squat, keg toss, atlas stones

#	Name	Nationality	Pts
1	Vytautas Lalas	Lithuania	29
2	Ervin Katona	Serbia	23
3	Louis Philippe Jean	Canada	21
4	Jerry Pritchett	United States	18
5	Graham Hicks	England	17.5
6	Ole Martin Hansen	Norway	16.5

=== Heat 5 ===
- Events: loading, truck pull, viking press for reps, super yoke, car deadlift for reps, atlas stones

#	Name	Nationality	Pts
1	Terry Hollands	England	30
2	Krzysztof Radzikowski	Poland	27.5
3	Mike Burke	United States	24
4	Alex Moonen	Netherlands	19
5	James Fennelly	Ireland	18.5
6	Eben Le Roux	Australia	5

== Finals events results ==
=== Event 1: Super Yoke ===
- Weight: 440 kilograms (970 lb)
- Course length: 40 metres (130 ft)
- Time limit: 75 seconds

#	Name	Nationality	Time (sec)	Event Pts	Overall Pts
1	Brian Shaw	United States	28.40	10	10
2	Vytautas Lalas	Lithuania	30.05	9	9
3	Mike Jenkins	United States	31.49	8	8
4	Krzysztof Radzikowski	Poland	31.85	7	7
5	Terry Hollands	England	32.27	6	6
6	Hafþór Júlíus Björnsson	Iceland	33.55	5	5
7	Žydrūnas Savickas	Lithuania	37.89	4	4
8	Johannes Årsjö	Sweden	33.9 metres (111 ft)	3	3
9	Jean-François Caron	Canada	27.3 metres (90 ft)	2	2
10	Ervin Katona	Serbia	25.75 metres (84.5 ft)	1	1

=== Event 2: Max Log Lift ===
#	Name	Nationality	Weight	Event Pts	Overall Pts
1	Žydrūnas Savickas	Lithuania	220 kilograms (490 lb)	10	14
2	Mike Jenkins	United States	210 kilograms (460 lb)	8.5	16.5
2	Krzysztof Radzikowski	Poland	210 kilograms (460 lb)	8.5	15.5
4	Vytautas Lalas	Lithuania	200 kilograms (440 lb)	7	16
5	Brian Shaw	United States	185 kilograms (408 lb)	4.5	14.5
5	Hafþór Júlíus Björnsson	Iceland	185 kilograms (408 lb)	4.5	9.5
5	Johannes Årsjö	Sweden	185 kilograms (408 lb)	4.5	7.5
5	Ervin Katona	Serbia	185 kilograms (408 lb)	4.5	5.5
9	Terry Hollands	England	170 kilograms (370 lb)	2	8
10	Jean-François Caron	Canada	No lift	0	2

=== Event 3: Bus Pull ===
- Weight: 24,500 kilograms (54,000 lb)
- Course length: 25 metres (82 ft)
- Time limit: 75 seconds

#	Name	Nationality	Time (sec)	Event Pts	Overall Pts
1	Terry Hollands	England	42.97	10	18
2	Hafþór Júlíus Björnsson	Iceland	44.71	9	18.5
3	Vytautas Lalas	Lithuania	52.56	8	24
4	Žydrūnas Savickas	Lithuania	55.35	7	21
5	Brian Shaw	United States	65.12	6	20.5
6	Mike Jenkins	United States	70.41	5	21.5
7	Johannes Årsjö	Sweden	19.9 metres (65 ft)	4	11.5
8	Jean-François Caron	Canada	9.9 metres (32 ft)	3	5
9	Krzysztof Radzikowski	Poland	4.55 metres (14.9 ft)	2	17.5
10	Ervin Katona	Serbia	1.6 metres (5.2 ft)	1	6.5

=== Event 4: Deadlift ===
- Weight: 360 kilograms (790 lb)
- Time limit: 60 seconds

#	Name	Nationality	Repetitions	Event Pts	Overall Pts
1	Žydrūnas Savickas	Lithuania	8	10	31
2	Terry Hollands	England	7	8.5	26.5
2	Vytautas Lalas	Lithuania	7	8.5	32.5
4	Brian Shaw	United States	6	6.5	27
4	Jean-François Caron	Canada	6	6.5	11.5
5	Krzysztof Radzikowski	Poland	5	5	22.5
6	Hafþór Júlíus Björnsson	Iceland	4	4	22.5
7	Mike Jenkins	United States	3	2	23.5
7	Johannes Årsjö	Sweden	3	2	13.5
7	Ervin Katona	Serbia	3	2	8.5

=== Event 5: Natural Stones ===
- Weight: 5 Stone series ranging from 137–170 kilograms (302–375 lb)
- Time limit: 75 seconds

#	Name	Nationality	Time (sec)	Event Pts	Overall Pts
1	Hafþór Júlíus Björnsson	Iceland	5 in 25.52	10	32.5
2	Žydrūnas Savickas	Lithuania	5 in 32.13	9	40
3	Vytautas Lalas	Lithuania	5 in 33.29	8	40.5
4	Mike Jenkins	United States	5 in 37.40	7	30.5
5	Brian Shaw	United States	5 in 38.56	6	33
6	Krzysztof Radzikowski	Poland	5 in 49.27	5	27.5
7	Jean-François Caron	Canada	5 in 53.44	4	15.5
8	Johannes Årsjö	Sweden	5 in 59.19	3	16.5
9	Terry Hollands (Note: After this event Terry Hollands withdrew from the competition due to injury and took no further part.)	England	4 in 41.77	2	28.5
10	Ervin Katona (Note: After this event Ervin Katona withdrew from the competition due to injury and took no further part.)	Serbia	1 in 7.58	1	9.5

=== Event 6: Power Stairs ===
- Weight: 3 x 225 kilograms (496 lb) implements up 5 stairs each
- Time limit: 75 seconds

#	Name	Nationality	Time (sec)	Event Pts	Overall Pts
1	Hafþór Júlíus Björnsson	Iceland	36.82	10	42.5
2	Žydrūnas Savickas	Lithuania	42.83	9	49
3	Mike Jenkins	United States	43.77	8	38.5
4	Brian Shaw	United States	45.61	7	40
5	Jean-François Caron	Canada	1m 14.84	6	21.5
6	Krzysztof Radzikowski	Poland	13 stairs	5	32.5
7	Vytautas Lalas	Lithuania	11 stairs	4	44.5
8	Johannes Årsjö	Sweden	10 stairs	3	19.5

== Final standings ==
#	Name	Nationality	Pts
1st place, gold medalist(s)	Žydrūnas Savickas	Lithuania	49.0
2nd place, silver medalist(s)	Vytautas Lalas	Lithuania	44.5
3rd place, bronze medalist(s)	Hafþór Júlíus Björnsson	Iceland	42.5
4	Brian Shaw	United States	40.0
5	Mike Jenkins	United States	38.5
6	Krzysztof Radzikowski	Poland	32.5
7	Terry Hollands	England	28.5 (Injured)
8	Jean-François Caron	Canada	21.5
9	Johannes Årsjö	Sweden	19.5
10	Ervin Katona	Serbia	9.5 (Injured)

Preceded by 2011 World's Strongest Man	2012 World's Strongest Man	Succeeded by 2013 World's Strongest Man
