= Martin Wildauer =

Austrian strongman

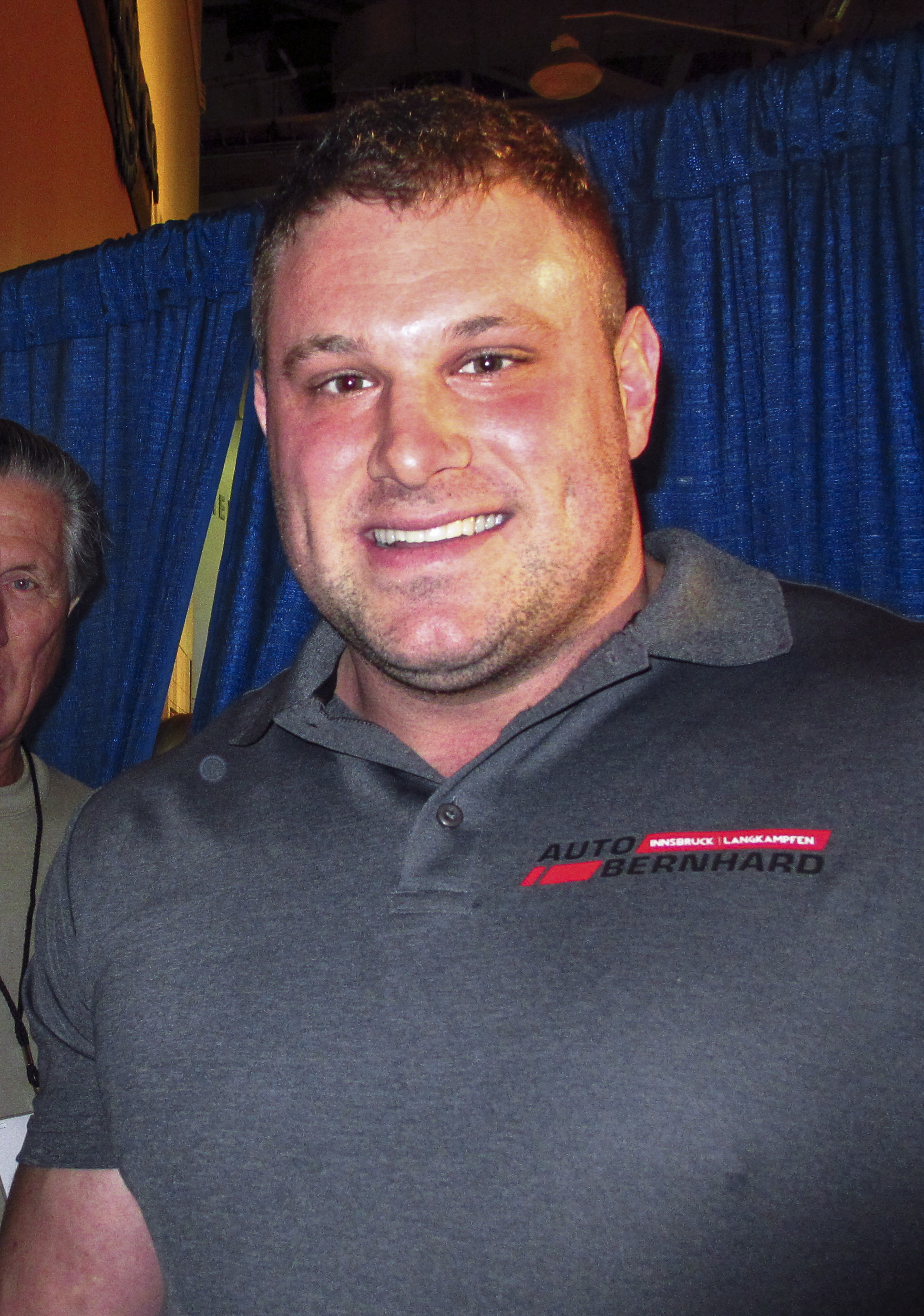
- Martin Wildauer in 2015

Personal information
- Nickname: The Deadlift Kid
- Born: Martin Marco Peter Wildauer; 27 November 1987 (age 38) Kufstein, Austria
- Height: 6 ft 3 in (1.91 m)
- Weight: 145 kg (320 lb)

Sport
- Sport: Strongman competitor
Medal record
Strongman
Representing Austria
World's Strongest Man
Qualified	2009 World's Strongest Man
Qualified	2011 World's Strongest Man
Qualified	2012 World's Strongest Man
Qualified	2013 World's Strongest Man
12th	2014 World's Strongest Man
Strongman Champions League
2nd	2009 SCL Qualification FIBO
3rd	2009 Finland
3rd	2011 Germany FIBO
2nd	2013 Serbia
3rd	2013 Slowakia
2nd	2014 FIBO Germany
3rd	2014 Serbia
3rd	2014 Latvia
1st	2014 Portugal
2nd	2014 Croatia
2nd	2014 Poland
3rd	2014 Romania
2nd	2014 Estonia
1st	2014 Overall
Giants Live
1st	2011 Finland
3rd	2014 UK
Austrian Summer Giants
5th	2007
3rd	2008
1st	2009
1st	2011
1st	2012
1st	2013
Austrian Winter Giants
1st	2008
1st	2010
1st	2011

Martin Wildauer (born 27 November 1987) is an Austrian strongman. He is an entrant to the World's Strongest Man as well as a well-known figure in Strongman Champions League and the Giants Live franchises.

Wildauer held the world record in the Bavarian stonelift and was known for his deadlifting.

== Early life ==
Wildauer was born in Kufstein, Tirol in Austria on 27 November 1987. He was a sports enthusiast even as a child and at the age of 10 started kickboxing. After winning some national competitions in Austria after two years he began boxing but due to school commitments he found he did not have the time to commit to boxing. With the time he did have he began weight training and although his parents tried to encourage this further by buying him weights at home he found that the best environment for his progress was the gym.

== Career ==
A meeting with a powerlifter introduced Wildauer to deadlifting and squatting, and by the age of 15 he was deadlifting 200 kg (441 lb). He began to compete at the age of 16 years and soon began to set records, thus far having set over 40 national records. He moved into strength athletics at nineteen, winning his first competition, a qualifier for the Austrian nationals. He then placed 5th at the Austrian nationals, improving to third the following year. In the same year he won the Austrian Winter Giants competition.

In 2009 a second place at the Strongman Fibo classic, behind Travis Ortmayer, qualified him for the Strongman Champions League. At his inaugural outing in the league in Serbia, he won the car deadlift and came 5th overall. He went on to compete at the next Strongman Champions League competition in Finland, where he set a new world record in the car deadlift and came 3rd overall. This in turn got him an invite to the World's Strongest Man. In what was deemed the "group of death" which also contained Žydrūnas Savickas and Brian Shaw, he did not manage to qualify for the final. In 2009 he won the Austria's Strongest Man title.

Wildauer won the 2010 Austrian Giants competition and 2014 MHP Strongman Champions League. In 2014 he reached his static strength peak and deadlifted 400 kg (882 lb) raw (in powerlifting standards) at the Eisenhart Black Deadlift Championships in Bavaria and broke Hans Strobl's championship record, on his way to become the Eisenhart deadlift champion. At the inaugural 2014 World Deadlift Championships he deadlifted 435 kg (959 lb), winning third place, and his lift still remains the Austrian national deadlift record.

In 2015, returning from an Achilles tendon injury, he won the Löwenbraukeller Starkbierfest traditional stone lifting competition in Munich, Germany and broke the twenty-five year old Bavarian stonelifting world record.

He was trained by the German strongman Heinz Ollesch.

== Personal records ==
During competitions

- Equipped Deadlift (with suit and straps) – 435 kg (959 lb) (2014 Europe's Strongest Man) (National Record)
- Raw Deadlift (no suit or straps) – 400 kg (882 lb) (2014 Eisenhart Black Deadlift Championships)
- Deadlift for reps (with suit and straps) – 350 kg (772 lb) x 10 reps (2014 SCL Romania)
- Log press – 180 kg (397 lb) (TBC) (National Record)
- Axle press (for reps) – 150 kg (331 lb) x 7 reps (2014 SCL Poland)
- Bavarian Stonelift – 350 kg (772 lb) for 100 cm (2010 FIBO Strongman ClassX) (Former world record)
- Frame carry (with straps) – 300 kg (661 lb) 40m course in 14.91 seconds (2014 SCL Hungary) (World Record)
- Power stairs (3 x 225–275 kg (496–606 lb) duck walks / total of 15 steps) – 39.44 seconds (2014 SCL Estonia) (World Record)
- Weight over bar – 25 kg (55 lb) over 5.60 metres (18 ft 4 in) (2013 SCL Serbia)
- Arm Over Arm Truck pull – 16,000 kg (35,274 lb) for 20 meters - 49.13 seconds (World Record)

During training

- Squat – 380 kg (838 lb)
- Bench press – 210 kg (463 lb) (Raw)
- Max Atlas stone – 200 kg (441 lb) x 4 times over a 4 ft bar

== Competition record ==
- 2004
  - 1. – Austrian Nationals Powerlifting
  - 3. – Tyrol Competition Powerlifting Open
  - 3. – Bavaria Cup – Deadlift
- 2005
  - 1. – Austrian Nationals Powerlifting Juniors
  - 2. – Bavaria Cup – Deadlift
  - 2. – Austrian Nationals Powerlifting Open
  - 3. – Tyrol Competition Powerlifting Open
  - 2. – Tyrol Competition Powerlifting – Bench Press Open
- 2006
  - 3. – Tyrol Competition Powerlifting Open
  - 1. – Golden Barbell Classic in Austria
  - 2. – Bavarian Stonelift in Bonbruck, Germany
  - 2. – International Bavarian Stonelift in Feldkirchen, Germany
  - 2. – Bavarian Stonelift in Bonbruck, Germany
- 2007
  - 1. – MoosBummerl-Cup Bavarian Stonelift, Germany
  - 1. – Bavaria Cup – Deadlift
  - 1. – CWA 4-Country Competition in Graz, Austria
  - 8. – IFSA Team WM, Ukraine
  - 1. – Austria's Strongest Man (Austrian Summer Giants – Qualification)
  - 5. – Austria's Strongest Man (Austrian Summer Giants)
  - 1. – International Bavarian Stonelift in Feldkirchen, Germany
- 2008
  - 1. – Austrian Winter Giants
  - 1. – Austrian Records Day in Obertrum
  - 4. – IFSA Team WM, Ukraine
  - 2. – International Competition in Serbia
  - 2. – CWA 4-Country Competition in Graz, Austria
  - 1. – International Bavarian Stonelift in Feldkirchen, Germany
  - 1. – Austria's Strongest Man (Austrian Summer Giants – Qualification)
  - 3. – Austria's Strongest Man (Austrian Summer Giants)
  - 2. – Day of Power in Fohnsdorf in Austria
  - 2. – Tyrol Competition Powerlifting Open
  - 2. – Team Competition Austria vs. Poland
- 2009
  - 2. – Strongman Fibo classic
  - 5. – Strongman Champions League 2009: Subotica
  - 3. – Strongman Champions League 2009: Ideapark
  - 1. – Bavarian Stonelift HebAuf, Germany
  - 1. – Bavarian Stonelift Klosterlechfeld, Germany
  - 8. – Strongman Champions League 2009: Slovakia
  - 1. – Austria's Strongest Man (Austrian Summer Giants)
  - 1. – International Competition in Salzburg, Austria
  - 1. – Eisenstrassen Giants, Austria
  - Q. – 2009 World's Strongest Man
  - 4. – Strongman Champions League 2009: Spain
  - 9. – Strongman Champions League 2009: London
- 2010
  - 1. – Bavarian Stonelift – Löwenbräukeller in Munich
  - 5. – Strongman Champions League 2010: FIBO Strongman Classic – Germany
  - 6. – Strongman Champions League 2010: Slovakia
  - 1. – Austrian Winter Giants
- 2011
  - 10. – Strongman Champions League 2011: Lapland-Iceman
  - 2. – Austria's King of Overhead
  - 3. – Strongman Champions League 2011: FIBO Strongman Classic – Germany
  - 4. – Strongman Champions League 2011: Serbia
  - 10. – Strongman Champions League 2011: Holland
  - 1. – Bavarian Stonelift in Grafing, Germany
  - 1. – Austria's Strongest Man (Austrian Summer Giants)
  - 1. – Giants Live 2011: Giants Live Finland
  - Q. – 2011 World's Strongest Man
  - 1. – Austrian Winter Giants
- 2012
  - 6. – Strongman Champions League 2011: Sarajevo-Final of 2011
  - 7. – Strongman Champions League 2012: ICEMAN in Finland
  - 1. – Bavarian Stonelift – Löwenbräukeller in Munich
  - 4. – Strongman Champions League 2012: Fibo Germany
  - 6. – Strongman Champions League 2012: Serbia
  - 1. – Austria's Strongest Man (Austrian Summer Giants)
  - injured – Strongman Champions League 2012: Holland
  - injured – Strongman Champions League 2012: Finland
  - 7. – Strongman Champions League 2012: Poland
  - 1. – International Competition in Salzburg, Austria
  - Q. – 2012 World's Strongest Man
- 2013
  - 1. – Bavarian Stonelift – Löwenbräukeller in Munich
  - 7. – Strongman Champions League 2013: FIBO Germany
  - 2. – Strongman Champions League 2013: Serbia
  - 9. – Strongman Champions League 2013: Latvia
  - 8. – Strongman Champions League 2013: Czech Republic
  - 1. – Austria's Strongest Man (Austrian Summer Giants)
  - 1. – International Germany-Cup – Weko-Cup in Germany
  - 1. – Bavarian Stonelift – Garmisch-Partenkirchen
  - 6. – Giants Live Poland
  - Q. – 2013 World's Strongest Man
  - 1. – Eisenstrassen Giants Team Competition, Austria
  - 3. – Strongman Champions League 2013: Slowakia
  - 5. – Strongman Champions League 2013: Poland
- 2014
  - 12. – 2014 World's Strongest Man
  - 2. – Strongman Champions League 2014: FIBO Germany
  - 1. – Bavarian Stonelift – Löwenbräukeller in Munich
  - 2. – International King of Overhead
  - 1. – Eisenhart 2014 – Best Deadlifter 400 kg raw
  - 3. – Strongman Champions League 2014: Serbia
  - 4. – Strongman Champions League 2014: Finland
  - 9. – Strongman Champions League 2014: Holland
  - 3. – Strongman Champions League 2014: Latvia
  - 1. – Strongman Champions League 2014: Portugal
  - 2. – Strongman Champions League 2014: Croatia
  - 2. – Strongman Champions League 2014: Poland
  - 3. – World Deadlift Championship in Leeds – 435kg
  - 6. – Europe's Strongest Man in Leeds
  - 1. – Austria's Strongest Man in Obertrum, Austria
  - 4. – Strongman Champions League 2014: Hungary
  - 1. – Eisenstrassen Giants Team Competition, Austria
  - 6. – Strongman Champions League 2014: Sambia
  - 3 – Strongman Champions League 2014: Romania
  - 4 – Strongman Champions League 2014: Savickas Classic Lithuania
  - 2 – Strongman Champions League 2014: Estonia
  - 1. – WORLDCHAMPION SCL 2014
