= Graham Hicks =

English strongman

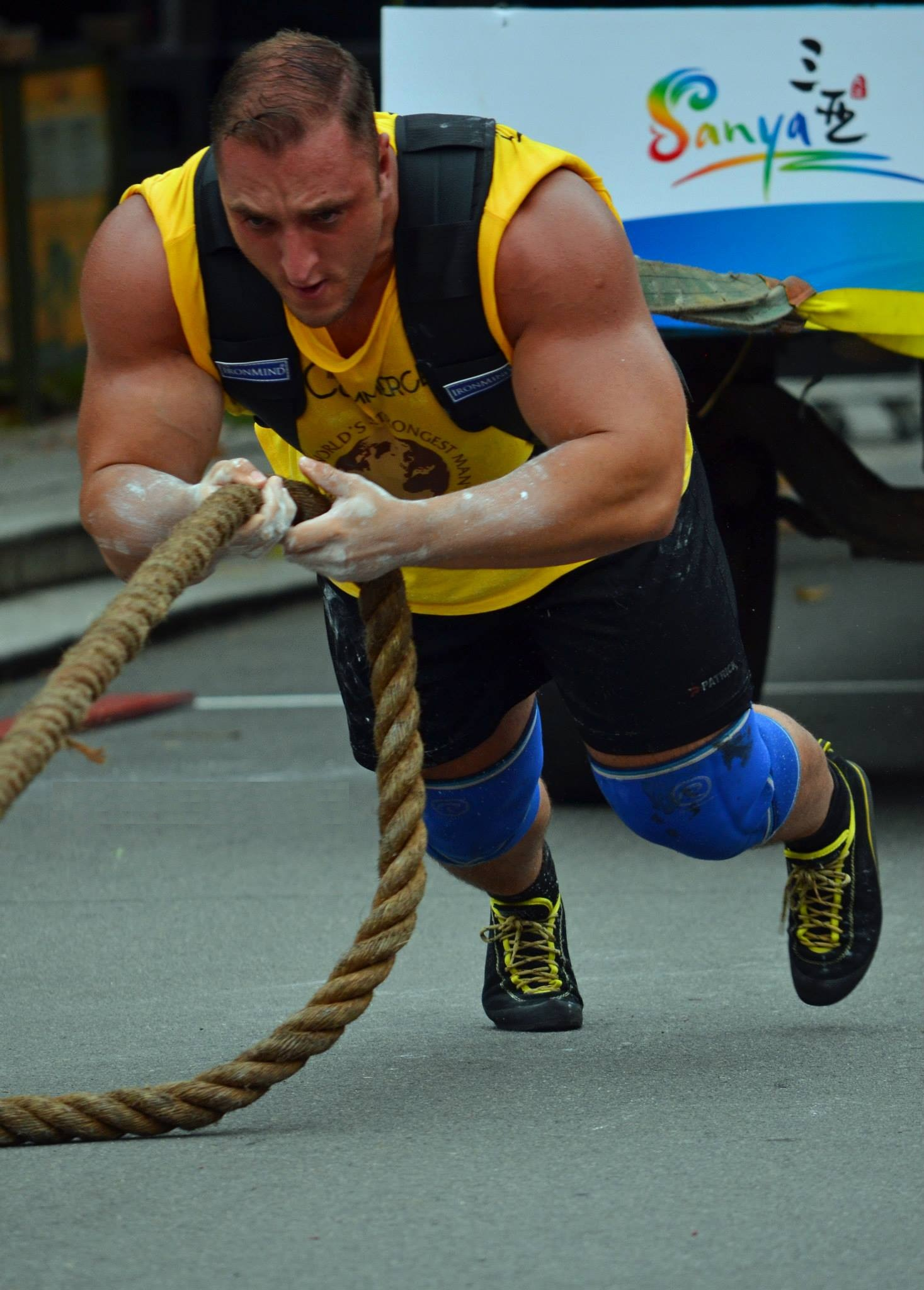
- Hicks at the 2013 World's Strongest Man

Personal information
- Nickname: Hicksy
- Born: 15 November 1985 (age 40) Morecambe, Lancashire, England
- Height: 5 ft 10 in (1.78 m)
- Weight: 150 kg (331 lb)

Sport
- Sport: Strongman
Medal record
Strongman
Representing United Kingdom
World's Strongest Man
Qualified	2012 World's Strongest Man
Qualified	2013 World's Strongest Man
Qualified	2014 World's Strongest Man
Qualified	2015 World's Strongest Man
Qualified	2018 World's Strongest Man
10th	2020 World's Strongest Man
Qualified	2023 World's Strongest Man
Europe's Strongest Man
3rd	2014 Europe's Strongest Man
5th	2018 Europe's Strongest Man
4th	2020 Europe's Strongest Man
3rd	2021 Europe's Strongest Man
13th	2023 Europe's Strongest Man
Shaw Classic
11th	2021 Shaw Classic
Giants Live
6th	2014 Hungary
4th	2022 World Open
Strongman Champions League
11th	2017 SCL FIBO
3rd	2017 SCL Overhead
5th	2017 SCL Holland
1st	2025 SCL Poland
Representing England
Britain's Strongest Man
4th	Britain's Strongest Man 2012
5th	Britain's Strongest Man 2013
2nd	Britain's Strongest Man 2014
8th	Britain's Strongest Man 2015
3rd	Britain's Strongest Man 2017
2nd	Britain's Strongest Man 2018
1st	Britain's Strongest Man 2019
3rd	Britain's Strongest Man 2021
3rd	Britain's Strongest Man 2023
5th	Britain's Strongest Man 2026
UK's Strongest Man
2nd	2019 UK's Strongest Man
Other local competitions
7th	2010 North England's u105kg
3rd	2010 England's strongest u105kg
6th	UK's strongest u105kg
1st	2011 Qualifier for Britain's u105kg
5th	2011 Qualifier for UK's
1st	2011 North England's u105kg
2nd	2011 Bodypower Open
1st	2011 England's strongest u105kg
1st	2011 Britain's Strongest u105kg
1st	2011 Team Competition
1st	2012 Champion of u105kg
4th	2012 Opens Euro Qualifier
1st	2012 Northern Qualifier
6th	2012 Competition in Marajampoli
4th	2013 Opens Euro Qualifier
1st	2013 Yorkshire's Strongest Man
Powerlifting
Representing United Kingdom
2nd	Big Dogs 4

Graham Hicks (born 15 November 1985 in Morecambe, Lancashire) is an English strongman and powerlifter.

A Britain's Strongest Man champion and a two time Europe's Strongest Man bronze medalist, he is one of the deadlifters in strongman.

== Personal life ==
Graham Hicks was born in 1985 in Morecambe, Lancashire. He was a keen sportsman in his childhood and teens although his main interest was football. He started training in the gym as a bodybuilder and at the age of 25, a friend asked him to try strongman training with him. He caught the strength bug, altered his training to accommodate this, and has since been exceedingly successful.

In 2013, Hicks had a full-time job working as a design support engineer for BAE Systems, starting as an apprentice.

== Strongman career ==
Hicks' career as a strongman began in 2010 as an under 105 kg competitor. He came seventh at the 2010 Northern England u105kg Qualifier and third at the 2010 England's Strongest Man u105 contests.

In 2011, he dominated the u105kg scene and made his first foray into the Open weight class beating people who were considerably heavier than himself.

In 2012, he came in fourth at the qualifier for Europe's Strongest Man. Whilst this didn't earn him a spot at Europe's, he did get an invitation to Britain's Strongest Man where placed fourth. This placing gave him an invitation to the World's Strongest Man competition, held in LA. He managed fourth place in his group and even won his first event, the loading race.

One of Hicks' key strength has been his pressing power. He was the first person in the UK to lift a 200 kg (441 lb) log and has since gone on to press a 211 kg (465 lb) log in World Log Lifting Championships in 2015, sharing the British log record with Eddie Hall.

In 2017 Strongman Champions League Fibo, Hicks broke Krzysztof Radzikowski's Log press (with SCL giant log) world record with 207 kg (456 lb).

In September 2020, Hicks competed at the 2020 Europe's Strongest Man competition and achieved a new British record in the Log Lift, lifting 220 kg (485 lb) and placed fourth in the overall competition. In November 2020, Hicks competed at the 2020 World's Strongest Man competition and qualified for his first final. However, he had to withdraw from the competition due to a bicep tear.

In September 2021, Hicks placed 3rd at the 2021 Europe's Strongest Man competition. This also earned him an invite to the 2022 World's Strongest Man. However, he declined his invitation, as he was not permitted to travel to the United States from the United Kingdom due to his COVID-19 vaccination status. Hicks returned to the WSM competition in 2023, but did not make the final.

In 2023, Hicks won the World Deadlift Championships by lifting 470 kg (1,036 lb) in Cardiff, becoming the seventh highest deadlifter in strongman at that point.

In 2024, Hicks spent much of the year training to beat Hafþór Júlíus Björnsson's 501 kg (1,105 lb) all-time world record deadlift from 2020 during 2024 World Deadlift Championships, however he came in joint-seventh place at the event, only being able to lift 425 kg (937 lb).

Hicks returned to competition in 2025 by placing 6th at the Giants Live organized England's Strongest Man. In August, he continued his comeback by winning his first international competition in six years at the Strongman Champions League Poland. He shared victory in the first event and ultimately finished three points clear of Oskar Ziolkowski.

== Personal Records ==
Strongman

- Deadlift (Equipped & with figure 8 straps) – 470 kg (1,036 lb) (2023 World Deadlift Championships)
- Log press – 220 kg (485 lb) (2020 Europe's Strongest Man)
- Log press (with SCL giant log) – 207 kg (456 lb) (2017 SCL Fibo) (World Record)
- Max Atlas stone – 193 kg (425 lb) as a part of a 4 stone run (2021 Shaw Classic)
- Super Yoke – 450 kg (992 lb) for 20 m (66 ft) in 8.61 secs (2018 Britain's Strongest Man) (World Record)

Powerlifting

- Squat (Raw with wraps) – 440 kg (970 lb) (2019 Big Dogs 4)
- Bench press (Raw) – 270 kg (595 lb) (2019 Big Dogs 4)
- Deadlift (Raw) – 405 kg (893 lb) (2018 Andy Bolton Deadlift Challenge)
- Total – 1,100 kg (2,425 lb) (440 + 270 + 390 kg (970 + 595 + 860 lb)) (2019 Big Dogs 4)
