= Derek Poundstone =

American strength athlete and police officer

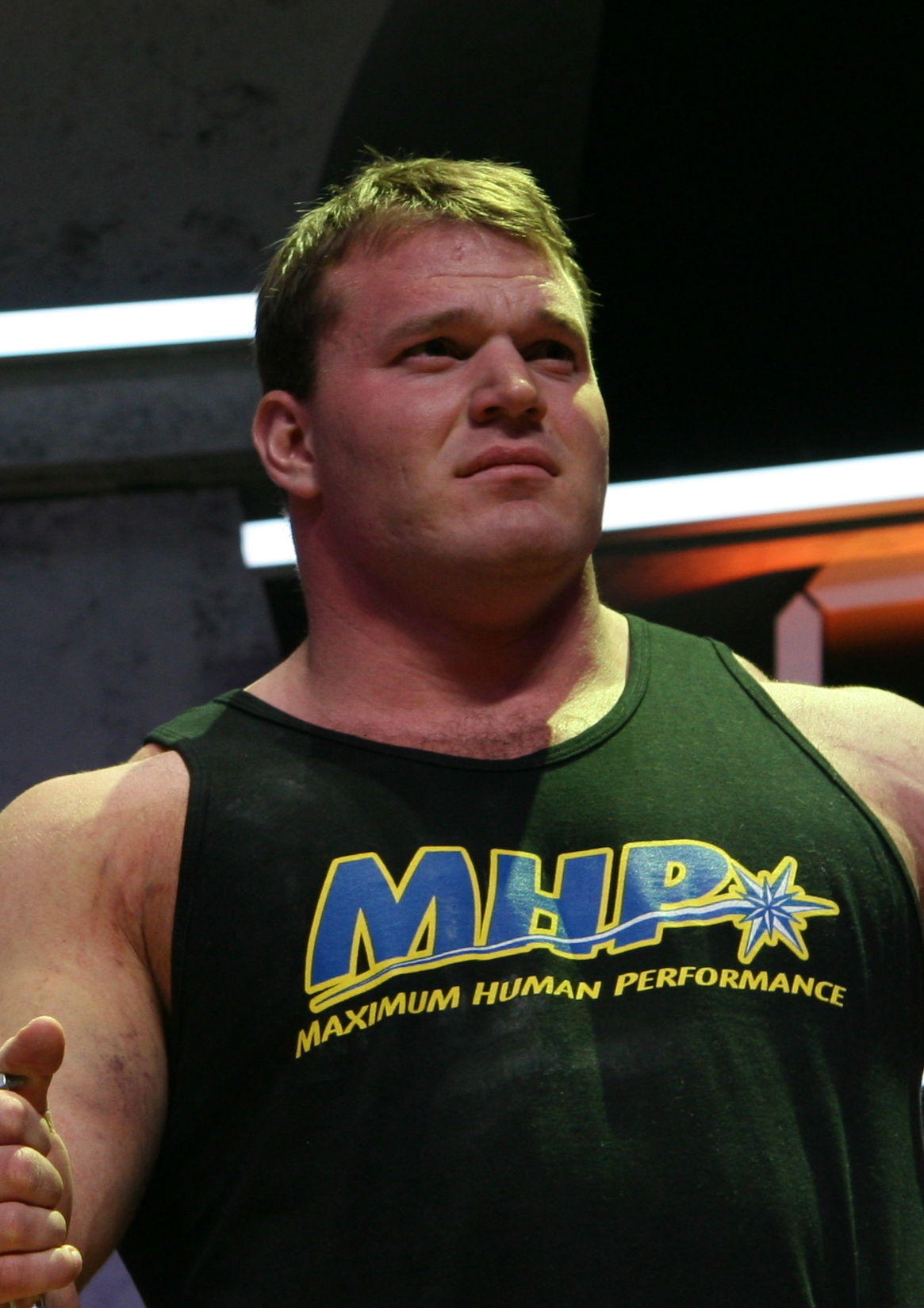
- Born: September 28, 1981 (age 45); Mountain Home Air Force Base; Elmore County, Idaho, U.S.
- Occupations: Police officer (since 2004); Strongman (until 2017)
- Height: 6 ft 1 in (1.85 m)
- Title: 3 times "America's Strongest Man"
- Children: Jordyn and Callen

Competition record

Strongman

Representing United States

World's Strongest Man
2nd	2008 World's Strongest Man
4th	2009 World's Strongest Man
9th	2010 World's Strongest Man
5th	2011 World's Strongest Man
Qualified	2012 World's Strongest Man

IFSA 2-Man Team World Championships
3rd	2007 Team USAw/Tom McClure

World Strongman Challenge
2nd	2006

Fortissimus
1st	2008
2nd	2009

Arnold Strongman Classic
2nd	2008 Arnold Strongman Classic
1st	2009 Arnold Strongman Classic
1st	2010 Arnold Strongman Classic
2nd	2012 Arnold Strongman Classic
9th	2013 Arnold Strongman Classic

IFSA Strongman World Championships
4th	2007

Strongman Super Series
1st	2008 Mohegan Sun Grand Prix
2nd	2008 Madison Square Garden
4th	2008 Sweden Grand Prix
1st	2008 Overall Champion
1st	2010 Mohegan Sun Grand Prix

America's Strongest Man
5th	2006
1st	2007
1st	2009
1st	2010

Giants Live
1st	2009 Mohegan Sun Grand Prix
1st	2010 Ukraine
1st	2013 Australia

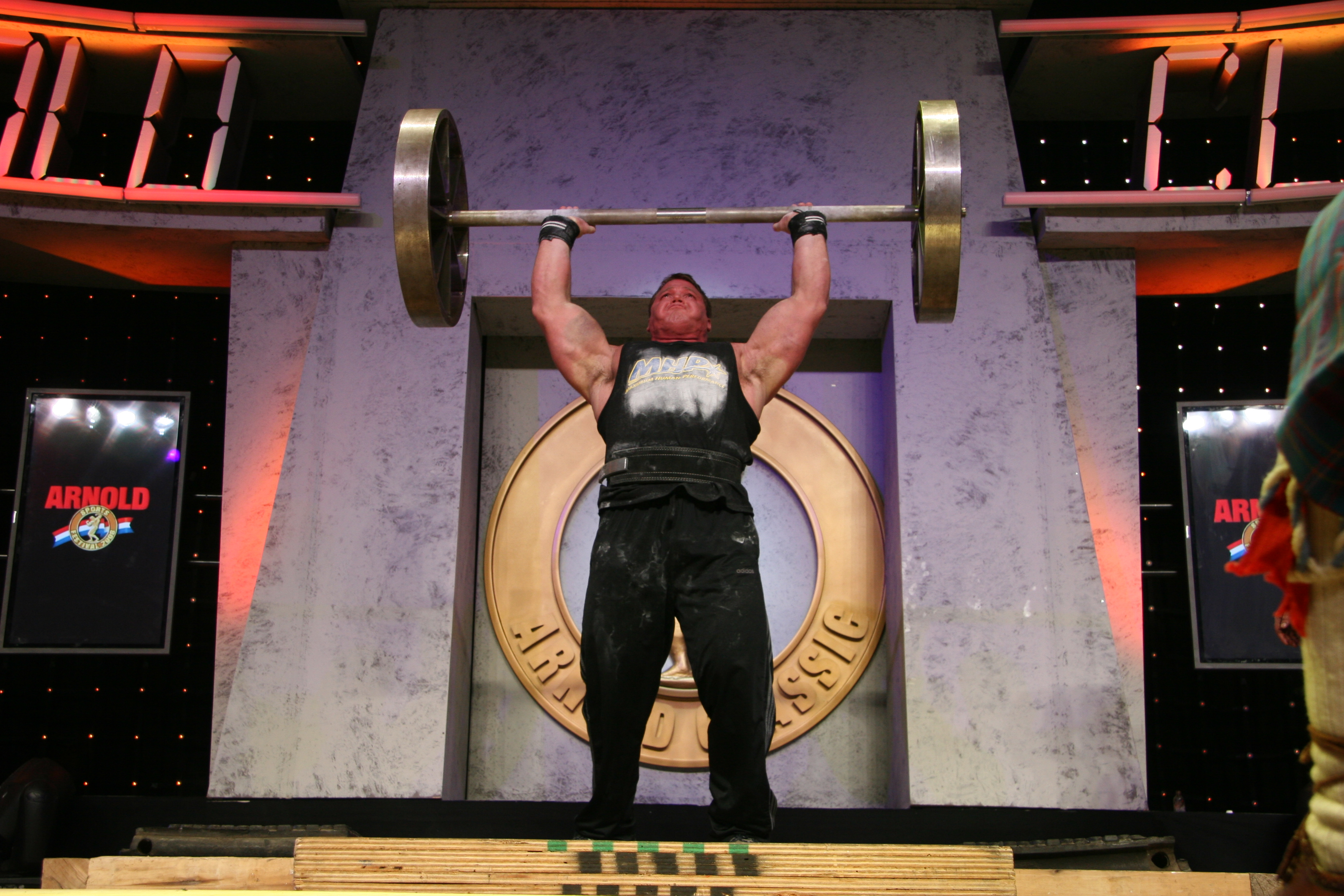
DEREK POUNDSTONE Pressing the Apollon's Axle overhead at the 2008 Arnold Strongman Classic

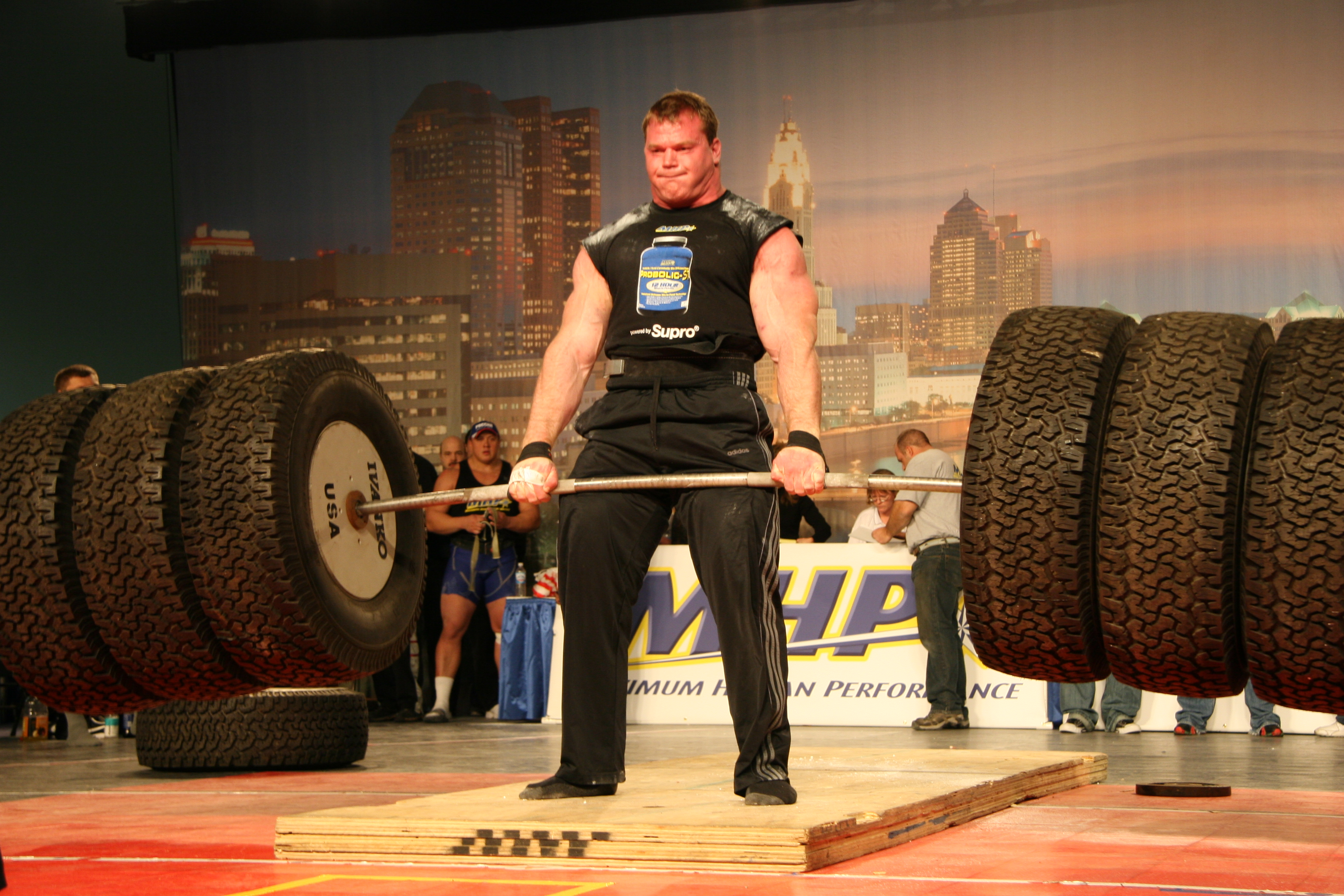
Derek pulled 911.5 lbs during the Hummer Tire Deadlift at the 2008 Arnold Strongman Classic

Derek Anthony Poundstone (born September 28, 1981) is an American police officer, former professional strongman and strength coach from Woodbridge, Connecticut. He was the runner-up at the 2008 World's Strongest Man, a two-time Arnold Strongman Classic champion (2009 and 2010), and a three-time winner of America's Strongest Man (2007, 2009, 2010). Several strength analysts and historians regard Poundstone as the best athlete to have never won World's Strongest Man title.

He is also a high-ranking officer for the Naugatuck, Connecticut Police Department and is the former owner and landlord of an apartment complex and gym.

== Background ==
Poundstone was born into a military family at Mountain Home Air Force Base in Elmore County, Idaho. He lived in Spain and Italy until he was 10, after which the family settled in Rapid City, South Dakota, where Poundstone began lifting weights at the local YMCA branch. Poundstone moved to Waterbury, Connecticut in 1999.

== Strength sports ==
=== Early career ===
Poundstone began his sporting career by competing in powerlifting, encouraged by a local champion, and progressed to become the Connecticut State Champion. He started competing in strongman after finding an advertisement for a contest on the back of a powerlifting flyer. After earning his Professional Strongman card from the ASC (American Strongman Corporation), Poundstone took two years off competing to enter the Police Academy and become a police officer in Naugatuck, Connecticut.

=== 2006 ===
He returned to compete in strongman, and placed fifth in the 2006 St. Patrick's Strongman National Qualifier. Poundstone then went on to place 2nd to the current IFSA World Champion Žydrūnas Savickas in the 2006 World Strongman Challenge contest in Tulsa, Oklahoma. Next, Poundstone placed 5th in the 2006 America's Strongest Man contest. This earned him an invitation to the 2006 IFSA World Championships. On October 26, 2006, two weeks before the IFSA World Championships, Poundstone severely injured his lumbar spine during training while attempting a maximum effort deadlift of 366 kg (805 lb). Poundstone had a lumbar disc herniation (L4/5) and a massive spinal cord hemorrhage. Doctors told him that he would never lift again due to the severity of the injury.

=== 2007 ===
Poundstone's return to the strongman competition circuit was the 2007 St. Patrick's Strongman contest in Columbia, South Carolina. Poundstone won by 13.5 points and overcame his deadlifting injury fear by completing a 364 kg (800 lb) deadlift during the competition. This victory qualified Poundstone to compete in the 2007 America's Strongest Man contest, which Poundstone won by a record 30 points. Poundstone also qualified to compete in the 2007 IFSA World Championships in Geumsan, South Korea. Additionally, Poundstone received an invitation from Dr. Terry Todd to compete at the 2008 Arnold Strongman Classic, in Columbus, Ohio.

Poundstone also competed in two Team Strongman contests and a Highland Games/Strongman hybrid contest. First was the USA vs. World team contest put on by Al Thompson in Philadelphia. Poundstone and his team (Travis Ortmayer, Van Hatfield, Nick Best, Walt Gogola) pulled out an unprecedented victory against three of the top five European strongmen in the World, (Žydrūnas Savickas, Vasyl Virastyuk, and Andrus Murumets). Team USA won the first three events and Team World won the next three events. Team USA won with a victory in the final event, the Atlas Stones.

Poundstone's next contest was in Callander, Scotland at the World Highland Games contest. This contest was a Highland Games / Strongman hybrid. Poundstone won the event and set two world records. Poundstone broke Igor Pedan's 9 rep 125 kg (275 lb) Log Clean and Press World Record by powering through 13 reps, with 130 kg (286 lb). Poundstone also broke Žydrūnas Savickas, 140 kg (308 lb) Block Press World Record by pressing out a 145 kg (319 lb) block.

Poundstone's next contest was a team contest, the World's Strongest Nation held in Ukraine. This time Team USA consisted of Poundstone along with Travis Ortmayer, Tom McClure, and Brian Shaw. Team USA placed 2nd overall behind Team Ukraine led by Vasyl Virastyuk.

Poundstone competed in the 2007 IFSA World Championship held in Geumsan, South Korea. Poundstone was in 2nd position throughout the entire competition until the last event. During the final event, Poundstone ripped open his hands during the Farmer's Walk event, which caused him to drop the implements. Poundstone placed 4th overall in his first appearance at the World Championship, 2 points behind Mikhail Koklyaev and 1 point behind the 2006 World Champ Žydrūnas Savickas. Vasyl Virastyuk won the competition, becoming the first athlete to win both the World's Strongest Man Title and the IFSA World Championships. Poundstone's performance was the best ever recorded by an American at the IFSA World Championships.

Poundstone decided to compete on the WSM/SS circuit after sufficient political differences with IFSA. Poundstone was called up by Odd Haugen and asked to enter as a replacement athlete into the Mohegan Sun Super Series due to Kevin Nee pulling out with a torn biceps. Poundstone accepted and competed for the first time against Mariusz Pudzianowski. Poundstone defeated the four-time WSM champion and secured a qualification spot for the 2008 World's Strongest Man contest.

=== 2008 ===
Poundstone competed in the 2008 Arnold Strongman Classic contest, his first appearance at the Arnold. Poundstone would take second place behind Žydrūnas Savickas.

On June 29, 2008, during the 2 day Fortissimus contest, Poundstone became the first American to defeat Žydrūnas Savickas. Poundstone and Savickas were approximately 40 points ahead of all the other competitors. Poundstone was the only athlete who managed to lift the 517 lb Louis Cyr Stone and secured his victory and title at the "Mightiest Man on the Planet."

Poundstone became the 2008 Strongman Super Series champion after accumulating the most points throughout the Grand Prix. 1st at the Mohegan Sun, 2nd at Madison Square Garden, and 4th at Sweden earned Poundstone enough to take the overall title.

Poundstone competed in the 2008 World's Strongest Man competition where he and Mariusz Pudzianowski, Poland's then four-time champion would go head-to-head in the final event, the atlas stones, with Poundstone leading in points. In the atlas stones, Poundstone gained the lead, but as he lifted the final stone, the stone slipped, falling to the ground and giving Pudzianowski his record 5th World's Strongest Man title.

=== 2009 ===
Poundstone's next challenge was the 2009 Arnold Strongman Classic. With Žydrūnas Savickas opting to take a year off, the crown was vacant. Poundstone set a new world record with 15 reps in the circus dumb bell event. Poundstone took first place overall, and became only the third man behind Mark Henry and Žydrūnas Savickas to win the Arnold Strongman Classic title since its inception in 2002.

In May 2009, Poundstone was scheduled to defend his title at the Mohegan Sun Strongman Championship hosted by Giants Live. Poundstone won five of six events, taking second on one event, and took the overall title. Poundstone also set a new world record on the max Apollon's axle clean and press with 415 lbs.

Poundstone competed in the 2009 World's Strongest Man competition, which took place in Malta, coming in fourth place after Brian Shaw, Mariusz Pudzianowski and Žydrūnas Savickas.

=== 2010 ===
Poundstone successfully defended his title at the 2010 Arnold Strongman Classic. Leading up to the last event, the timber carry, Poundstone had a 3-point lead over 6-time champion Žydrūnas Savickas. Poundstone won the last event and the overall title for a second consecutive time, only the second man to accomplish this feat at the Arnold Strongman Classic. Žydrūnas Savickas came in second and Travis Ortmayer came in third place. During the awards ceremony, Poundstone proposed to his girlfriend on stage and she happily accepted.

Poundstone defended his title at the 2010 Mohegan Sun Strongman Championships hosted by Giants Live, winning 3 out of 6 events including the shield carry. This was Poundstone's third consecutive victory at this contest. Brian Shaw came in second and Stojan Todorchev came in third place.

Shortly before the 2010 World's Strongest Man contest, Poundstone severely tore his quad muscle and was unsure if he would be able to compete, but he decided to heal and focus on upper body training. Poundstone was able to qualify for the finals and finished in 9th place overall. Less than 24 hours after the 2010 WSM contest, Poundstone won his 3rd America's Strongest Man title and broke Nick Best's Jón Páll Sigmarsson Stone carry world record.

=== Present day ===
Poundstone is currently coaching professional strongman Rob Kearney.

== Personal life ==
Poundstone married fiancée Kristin Nelson on Saturday June 25, 2011, in Branford, Connecticut's Trinity Episcopal Church. Poundstone's training partner Louis-Philippe Jean was a groomsman at the wedding, and fellow strongman competitors Travis Ortmayer and Nick Best attended the wedding. In 2017 Derek and Kristin separated then later divorced. Both have since remarried.

== Personal records ==
Strongman
Done at Strongman competitions or during training

- IronMind S-Cubed bar Deadlift (at 1-inch deficit with straps) – 415 kg (915 lb) (2011 World's Strongest Man)
- Hummer Tire Deadlift (15 in off the floor) – 481 kg (1,060 lb) (2012 Arnold Strongman Classic)
- Car Squat – 360 kg (794 lb) x 12 reps (2007 World's Strongest Nation)
- Bench press (Raw) – 265 kg (584 lb), 227 kg (500 lb) x 3 reps (during training)
- Axle press – 188 kg (414 lb) (2009 Giants Live Mohegan Sun) (Former World Record)
- Log press for reps – 130 kg (287 lb) x 13 reps (clean and press each rep in 75 sec time limit) (2007 Callander Highland Games) (World Record)
- Metal Block press medley – 110–150 kg (243–331 lb) (4 blocks) in 51.93 secs (2011 World's Strongest Man - group 5) (World Record)
- Circus Dumbbell – 103 kg (227 lb) x 11 reps (clean and press each rep in 90 sec time limit) (2010 Arnold Strongman Classic) (World Record)
- Circus Dumbbell – 90 kg (198 lb) x 15 reps (clean and press each rep in 90 sec time limit) (2009 Arnold Strongman Classic) (World Record)
- Machine Bench press – 200 kg (441 lb) x 15 reps (2008 Strongman Super Series Sweden Grand Prix) (Joint-World Record)
- Manhood Stone (Max Atlas Stone) – 252 kg (556 lb) over 3 ft 6 in (42 in) bar (during training) (Former World Record)
- Manhood Stone (Max Atlas Stone) for reps – 242 kg (534 lb) x 3 reps over 4 ft (48 in) bar (2010 Arnold Strongman Classic)
- Louis Cyr Stone loading – 240.5 kg (530 lb) to 30 in platform (2008 Fortissimus) (World Record)

→ The stone Louis Cyr lifted in 1883 was 234.5 kg (517 lb)

- Jón Páll Sigmarsson Stone carry – 221 kg (487 lb) for 28.43 metres (93 ft 3 in) (2010 America's Strongest Man) (Former World Record)
- Farmer's walk (no straps) – 165 kg (364 lb) per each hand for 30m course in 16.09 seconds (2013 Giants Live FitX Melbourne) (World Record)
- Timber carry – 454 kg (1,001 lb) on a 35 ft inclined ramp in 9.28 secs (2010 Arnold Strongman Classic)
- Bale tote – 507 kg (1,118 lb) for 35 ft in 8.84 secs (2009 Arnold Strongman Classic)
- Super Yoke – 422 kg (930 lb) for 30 m (98 ft) in 12.78 secs (2010 Strongman Super Series Mohegan Sun Grand Prix) (World Record)

Powerlifting
Done at ADAU (Anti Drug Athletes United) Powerlifting Nationals as a Junior (21y, 125 class)

- Squat (Raw w/sleeves) – 243 kg (536 lb) (June, 2003)
- Bench press (Raw) – 170 kg (375 lb) (June, 2003)
- Deadlift (Raw) – 288 kg (635 lb) (June, 2003)
- Total (Raw w/sleeves) – 696.5 kg (1,536 lb) (June, 2003)

Done at ADAU (Anti Drug Athletes United) Powerlifting Nationals as a Junior (21y, 125 class)

- Bench press (Raw) – 196 kg (432 lb) (November, 2003)
- Deadlift (Raw) – 311 kg (686 lb) (November, 2003)

Done at RPS New England Revolution

- Squat (Raw w/wraps) – 301.5 kg (665 lb) (Mar, 2015)

== Achievements ==
Professional Competitive Record – [1st (6), 2nd (6), 3rd (3) – Out of Total(19)]
Performance Metric – .923 [American – .931 International – .915]

Professional	1st	2nd	3rd	4th	5th	6th	7th	8th	9th	10th	INJ	DNQ	Total
American	4	3	1		2								10
International	2	3	2	2									9
Combined	6	6	3	2	2								19

- (United States) Arnold Strongman Classic – Columbus, Ohio – 1st Place (March 6–8, 2010
- (United States) America's Strongest Man (USA National Championship) Morgantown, W. Virginia – Winner – (7/24-7/26/09)
- Fortissimus – Louis Cyr Strength Challenge Montmagny, Quebec, Canada – 2nd place (6/24-6/25/09)
- (United States) Giants Live (World's Strongest Man Qualifier) – Uncasville, Connecticut, US – 1st Place(5/17/2009)
- (United States) Arnold Strongman Classic – Columbus, Ohio – 1st Place (March 6–8, 2009)
- (United States) World's Strongest Man – Charleston, West Virginia, US – 2nd Place (September 2008)
- Sweden Super Series (World's Strongest Man Qualifier) – Sweden – 4th place (8/16/2008)
- Fortissimus – Louis Cyr World Strength Challenge – Notre-Dame-Du-Rosaire, Quebec, Canada – winner (6/28-29/2008)
- (United States) Madison Square Garden Super Series (World's Strongest Man Qualifier) – New York, US – 2nd place (6/21/2008)
- (United States) Arnold's Strongest Man – Columbus, Ohio, US – 2nd
- (United States) Mohegan Sun Super Series (World's Strongest Man Qualifier) – Uncasville, Connecticut, US – winner (1/19/2008)
- World vs. Lithuania Team Competition – Vilnius, Lithuania – 2nd (10/27/2007)
- IFSA 2-Man Team World Championship – Vilnius, Lithuania – 3rd (10/7/2007)
- IFSA World Championship – Geumsan, South Korea – 4th (2007)
- World's Strongest Nation Team Competition – Ukraine – 2nd (2007)
- World Highland Games – Callander, Scotland – winner (7/29/2007)
- (United States) USA vs. World Team Competition – Philadelphia, Pennsylvania, US – winner (2007)
- (United States) America's Strongest Man (USA National Championship) – Charlotte, North Carolina, US – winner (2007)
- (United States) St. Patrick's Strongman (USA National Championship Qualifier) – Columbia, South Carolina – winner (2007)
- USA vs. Lithuania Team Competition – Lithuania – 2nd (2006)
- World's Strongest Nation Team Competition – Kyiv, Ukraine – 3rd (2006)
- (United States) America's Strongest Man (USA National Championship) – Charlotte, North Carolina, US – 5th (2006)
- (United States) World Strongman Challenge (USA Grand Prix) – Tulsa, Oklahoma, US – 2nd (5/19/2006)
- (United States) St. Patrick's Strongman (USA National Championship Qualifier) – Columbia, South Carolina, US – 5th (3/17/2006)
- (United States) Florida Pro–Am – Florida, US – 3rd (2005)
- (United States) Northeast Regional Strongman Showdown – Wilmington, Massachusetts, US – winner (2004) earned ASC Professional Strongman card
- (United States) Connecticut State Powerlifting Champion
