= Alexander Klyushev =

Russian strongman

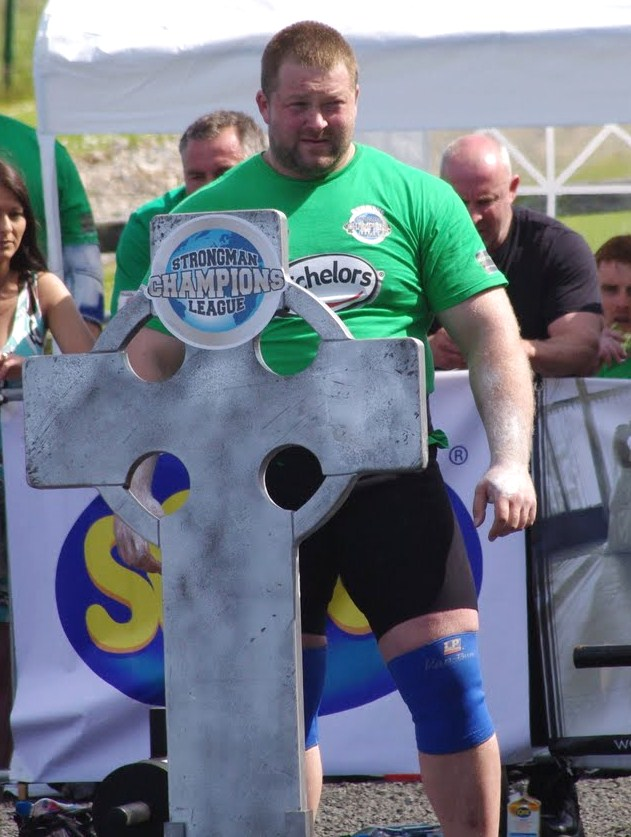
- Alexander Klyushev in 2010

Personal information
- Born: 23 December 1983 (age 42) Russia
- Occupation: Strongman
- Height: 6 ft 2 in (188 cm)
- Weight: 140 kg (309 lb)
Medal record
Powerlifting
Representing Russia
European Powerlifting Championships
1st	2008
Strongman
Representing Russia
World's Strongest Man
Qualified	2009 World's Strongest Man
Russia's Strongest Man
1st	2009
Strongman Champions League
3rd	Slovakia Grand Prix 2009
World's Strongest Nation
2nd	2008

Alexander Klyushev (born 23 December 1983) is a Russian strongman competitor and entrant to the World's Strongest Man competition.

== Early life and career ==
Klyushev was born and grew up in the north of Russia in the town of Nyandoma in the Arkhangelsk region. He was a sportsman in childhood and when 12 years old started doing judo. At 14 he discovered powerlifting. In 2002, he entered Vladimir State University to study history and received his degree in 2007. Due to his study he moved to Vladimir and this turned out to be instrumental in his sporting life. He began training with Serguey Ivanov, a coach of a number of world champion powerlifters. Under his tutelage, Klyushev became the junior World and European Champion and later became the senior European Champion. In 2006, he began to focus on strength athletics, termed power extreme, and in 2007 he took part in the all-Russian power extreme federation tournaments. He was included in the Russian national team which achieved second place in the World's Strongest Nation 2008. In 2009, he became Russia's Strongest Man and was invited to compete at The World's Strongest Man 2009.

He cites Ivan Poddubny as his hero, because he was a legendary Russian wrestler, circus performer and one of the first Russian strongmen. He has also cited Žydrūnas Savickas as someone for whom he has deep admiration, believing him to be the "strongest man in the world".

== Outside of sport ==
Alexander is a policeman, something he intends to continue to do when he has finished his strongman career.

== General statistics ==
- Leg press max weight: 600 kg
- Bench press max weight: 280 kg
- Squat max: Dead lift max: 420 kg
