= Johannes Årsjö =

Swedish strength athlete

- Born: Johannes Årsjö; 21 June 1985 (age 41); Sweden
- Occupation: Strongman
- Height: 6 ft 3 in (1.91 m)
- Title: Sweden's Strongest Man

Competition record

Strongman

Representing Sweden

World's Strongest Man
Qualified	2008 World's Strongest Man
Qualified	2009 World's Strongest Man
9th	2012 World's Strongest Man
8th	2013 World's Strongest Man
Qualified	2016 World's Strongest Man

Europe's Strongest Man
2nd	2014 Europe's Strongest Man
2nd	2016 Europe's Strongest Man

Strongman Champions League
2nd	2010 Bulgaria
2nd	2011 SCL Iceman Challenge
2nd	2011 Serbia
4th	2011 Holland
2nd	2012 Russia

Strongman Super Series
4th	2008 Viking Power Challenge
3rd	2009 Bucharest Grand Prix
8th	2009 Los Angeles Grand Prix
7th	2009 Gothenburg Grand Prix
2nd	2010 Viking Power Challenge
1st	2011 Viking Power Challenge

Giants Live
5th	2009 Mohegan Sun Grand Prix
7th	2009 Viking Power Challenge
3rd	2010 Ukraine
1st	2012 Norway
1st	2013 Norway
2nd	2015 Swedish Open
1st	2016 Scandinavian Open
1st	2017 Scandinavian Open

Sweden's Strongest Man
5th	2007
1st	2009
1st	2010
1st	2011
1st	2012
1st	2013
1st	2014
1st	2015
1st	2016
1st	2017

Johannes Årsjö (born 21 June 1985) is a Swedish professional strongman competitor notable for coming in 2nd in the 2014 and 2016 Europe's Strongest Man, and winning Sweden's Strongest Man nine times.

Having competed in 39 International strongman competitions and winning 5 of them, Årsjö is among the 50 most decorated strongmen of all time.

== Career ==
Born in Västervik, Sweden, Årsjö came to international prominence after winning Sweden's Strongest Man in 2009 A series of top 10 finishes in international grands prix within both the Giants Live and Strongman Super Series circuits led to an invite to the 2008 and 2009 World's Strongest Man contests, but he failed to qualify for the finals on both occasions. Årsjö was once again invited to the 2010 World's Strongest Man, but he was injured shortly before the qualifying heats began.

Årsjö held the Swedish national deadlift record with a lift of 420 kg (926 lb) performed at 2014 World Deadlift Championships for 11 years until 2024.

== Personal life ==
Årsjö's niece, Ebba Årsjö, is a para-alpine skier.

== Strongman competition record ==
- 2005
  - 3. - Norrköping's Strongest Man
- 2007
  - 5. - Sweden's Strongest Man
- 2008
  - 4. - Strongman Super Series 2008: Viking Power Challenge
  - Q. - 2008 World's Strongest Man
- 2009
  - 5. - Giants Live 2009: Mohegan Sun Grand Prix
  - 7. - Giants Live 2009: Stavanger (Viking Power Challenge)
  - 3. - Strongman Super Series 2009: Bucharest Grand Prix
  - 1. - Sweden's Strongest Man
  - 8. - Strongman Super Series 2009: Los Angeles Grand Prix
  - 7. - Strongman Super Series 2009: Gothenburg Grand Prix
  - Q. - 2009 World's Strongest Man
- 2010
  - 1. - Sweden's Strongest Man
  - 2. - Strongman Super Series 2010: Stavanger (Viking Power Challenge)
  - 3. - Giants Live 2010: Kyiv
  - Q. - 2010 World's Strongest Man
- 2012
  - 1. - Sweden's Strongest Man
  - 1. - Giants Live 2012: Norway
  - 9. - 2012 World's Strongest Man
- 2013
  - 1. - Sweden's Strongest Man
  - 1. - Giants Live 2013: Norway
  - 8. - 2013 World's Strongest Man
- 2014
  - 1. - Sweden's Strongest Man
  - 2. - Giants Live 2014: Sweden
  - 2. - Europe's Strongest Man
- 2015
  - 1. - Sweden's Strongest Man
  - 2. - Giants Live 2015: Sweden
- 2016
  - 1. - Sweden's Strongest Man
  - 2. - Europe's Strongest Man
  - Q. - 2016 World's Strongest Man
  - 1. - Giants Live 2016: Scandinavian Open
- 2017
  - 1. - Sweden's Strongest Man
  - 1. - Giants Live 2017: Scandinavian Open

== Personal records ==
- Deadlift – 420 kg (926 lb) (2014 World Deadlift Championships) (Swedish Record)
- Super Yoke – 453.5 kg (1,000 lb) for 40 m (130 ft) in 21.25 secs (2014 Europe's Strongest Man) (World Record)
- Atlas Stone over bar – 225 kg (496 lb) over a 4' bar (2014 Sweden's Strongest Man)
- Atlas Stone over bar (for reps) – 180 kg (397 lb) over a 4' bar x 8 reps (2009 Sweden's Strongest Man)
- Weight over bar – 25.5 kg (56 lb) over 5.20 metres (17 ft 1 in) (2012 SCL Russia)
- Arm over arm truck pull – 22,000 kg (48,502 lb) for 9.45 metres (31 ft 0 in) (2012 Giants Live Finland) (World Record)
