= Jörgen Ljungberg =

Swedish powerlifter and strongman (born 1967)

Personal information
- Born: Jörgen Ljungberg; 6 June 1967 (age 59) Jämtland, Sweden
- Occupation(s): Strongman, Powerlifting
- Height: 185 cm (6 ft 1 in)
Medal record
Powerlifting
Representing Sweden
World Games
4th	1997 Lahti	+90kg
Bronze medal – third place	2001 Akita	+90kg
4th	2005 Duisburg	+90kg
IPF World Powerlifting Championships
4th	1998 Cherkasy	110 kg
4th	1999 Trento	125 kg
2nd	2000 Akita	110 kg
5th	2001 Sotkamo	110 kg
4th	2002 Trencin	125 kg
6th	2003 Vejle	125 kg
3rd	2004 Cape Town	125 kg
Disqualified	2005 Miami	125 kg
EPF European Powerlifting Championships
2nd	1998	110 kg
1st	2000	110 kg
2nd	2002	110 kg
2nd	2004	125 kg
2nd	2005	+125kg
NPF Nordic Powerlifting Championships
1st	2000	125 kg
Battle of the Giants
1st	2005	+125kg
Strongman
Representing Sweden
World's Strongest Man
Qualified	2003 Victoria Falls
Sweden's Strongest Man
2nd	1997
2nd	2003
2nd	2004
IFSA Nordic Strongman Championships
5th	2005
Strongman Super Series
6th	2002 Sweden Grand Prix
10th	2004 Sweden Grand Prix

Jörgen Ljungberg (born 6 June 1967) is a powerlifter and strongman competitor from Sweden. Jörgen has competed in the World's Strongest Man contest as well as the IPF World Powerlifting Championships on numerous occasions. He has held several European powerlifting records during his career, and has achieved a podium finish at several IPF World Championships.

== Early life and career ==
Ljungberg was born in Kälarne locality in Jämtland, Sweden.

Jörgen won the 2005 Battle of the Giants, beating several top powerlifters including 2 time IPF World Champion Brad Gillingham. A year later, however, he was caught for doping. Following a brief suspension of two years, Ljungberg participated in Swedish Championship winning silver in 2010 for bench press and gold in classic powerlifting in 2014. He was caught doping again in 2017, and was suspended for four years.
