= Brady (given name) =

Brady is an Irish given name meaning "descendant of Bradach". Brady was the 69th most popular baby name in 2020, and the 273rd for U.S. baby names.

== Given name ==
- Brady Ackerman (born 1969), American sports commentator
- Brady L. Adams (1945–2015), American politician
- Brady Aiken (born 1996), American baseball player
- Brady Anderson (born 1964), American baseball executive
- Brady Anderson (footballer) (born 1975), Australian rules footballer
- Brady Austin (born 1993), Canadian ice hockey player
- Brady Ballew (born 1992), American soccer player
- Brady Barends (born 1989), South African cricketer
- Brady Barnett (born 1989), New Zealand cricketer
- Brady Barr (born 1963), American herpetologist
- Brady Basso (born 1997), American baseball player
- Brady Beeson (born 1987), American football player
- Brady Blade (born 1965), American musician
- Brady Bluhm (born 1983), American actor
- Brady Boswell (born 1997), American stock car driver
- Brady Bowman (born 1970), American philosopher
- Brady Boyd (born 1967), American pastor
- Brady Boyd (American football) (born 2002), American football player
- Brady Brammer, American politician
- Brady Breeze (born 1997), American football player
- Brady Brim-DeForest (born 1984), American entrepreneur
- Brady Browne (born 1983), Canadian football player
- Brady Bryant (born 1982), American soccer player
- Brady Canfield (born 1963), American skeleton racer
- Brady Choban (born 2000), American baseball player
- Brady Christensen (born 1996), American football player
- Brady Clark (born 1973), American baseball player
- Brady Clark (curler) (born 1977), American curler
- Brady Cook (born 2001), American football player
- Brady Corbet (born 1988), American actor
- Brady J. Deaton (born 1942), American educator
- Brady Dougan (born 1959), American banker
- Brady Ellison (born 1988), American archer
- Brady Feigl (born 1990), American baseball player
- Brady P. Gentry (1896–1966), American politician
- Brady Gilmore (born 2001), Australian cyclist
- Brady Golan (born 2007), American racing driver
- Brady Gollan (born 1965), Canadian snooker player
- Brady Grey (born 1995), Australian rules footballer
- Brady Haran (born 1976), Australian filmmaker
- Brady Hepner (born 2005), American actor
- Brady Heslip (born 1990), Canadian basketball player
- Brady Hicks (born 1978), American journalist
- Brady Hjelle (born 1990), American ice hockey player
- Brady Hoke (born 1958), American football coach
- Brady Hough (born 2003), Australian rules footballer
- Brady Jones (born 1988), Australian cricketer
- Brady Keeper (born 1996), American ice hockey player
- Brady Kennett (born 1974), New Zealand race car driver
- Brady Keys (1936–2017), American football player
- Brady Kiernan (born 1988), American filmmaker
- Brady Kurtz (born 1996), Australian speedway rider
- Brady Lail (born 1993), American baseball player
- Brady Leisenring (born 1982), American ice hockey
- Brady Leman (born 1986), Canadian skier
- Brady Malam (born 1973), New Zealand rugby league footballer
- Brady Manek (born 1998), American basketball player
- Brady Marchese, American football player
- Brady Martin (born 2007), Canadian ice hockey player
- Brady McDonnell (born 1977), American football player
- Brady E. Mendheim Jr. (born 1968), American judge
- Brady Nelson (born 1978), American businessman
- Brady Noon (born 2005), American actor
- Brady North (born 1991), American baseball coach
- Brady Paxton (1947–2024), American politician
- Brady Peeti (born 1988), New Zealand actor
- Brady Poppinga (born 1979), American football player
- Brady Quinn (born 1984), American football player
- Brady Raggio (born 1972), American baseball player
- Brady Rawlings (born 1981), Australian rules footballer
- Brady Reardon (born 1986), Canadian skier
- Brady Rodgers (born 1990), American baseball player
- Brady Rush (born 1999), New Zealand rugby union footballer
- Brady Russell (born 1998), American football player
- Brady Sallee, American basketball coach
- Brady Scott (born 1999), American soccer player
- Brady Seals (born 1969), American
- Brady Sheldon (born 1993), American football player
- Brady Sih (born 1970), Taiwanese sailor
- Brady Singer (born 1996), American baseball player
- Brady Skjei (born 1994), American ice hockey player
- Brady Smigiel (born 2006), American football player
- Brady Smith (disambiguation), multiple people
- Brady Stewart (born 1982), American powerlifter
- Brady Tkachuk (born 1999), American ice hockey player
- Brady Toops (born 1981), American singer-songwriter
- Brady Udall (born 1971), American writer
- Brady Wagoner (born 1980), American-Danish psychologist
- Brady Walker (1921–2007), American basketball player
- Brady Walkinshaw (born 1984), American politician
- Brady Watt (born 1990), Australian golfer
- Brady West, American statistician
- Brady Wilks (born 1980), American photographer
- Brady Williams (born 1979), American baseball manager
- Brady Wiseman (born 1957), American politician

== See also ==
- Brady (disambiguation), a disambiguation page
- Brady (surname), people with the surname of Brady

== See also ==
- Bradie (disambiguation)
