= Brady =

Brady may refer to:

== People ==
- Brady (surname)
- Brady (given name)
- Brady (nickname)

== Places in the United States ==
- Brady, Montana, a census-designated place and unincorporated community
- Brady, Nebraska, a village
- Brady, Texas, a city
- Brady, Washington, a census-designated place
- Brady Township (disambiguation)
- Brady Lake (Ohio)
- Brady Creek Reservoir, also known as Brady Lake and Brady Reservoir, McCulloch County, Texas

== Arts and entertainment ==
- "Duncan and Brady", also known as "Brady", a traditional murder ballad
- The fictional Brady family, in the American television show The Brady Bunch and various sequels and spinoffs
- Brady Black, a character in the American soap opera Days of Our Lives

== Companies ==
- Brady Corporation, a manufacturer of products for identifying components used in workplaces
- Brady Drum Company, a manufacturer of drums in Western Australia

== Law ==
- Brady v. Maryland, a landmark 1963 US Supreme Court case
- Brady v. United States, a 1970 US Supreme Court case
- Brady v Brady, a 1989 UK company law case
- Brady Handgun Violence Prevention Act, a US law which mandates background checks on firearm purchases.
- Brady material, American legal principle regarding exculpatory or impeaching information that is material to the guilt or punishment of the defendant

== See also ==
- Brady Bonds, dollar-denominated bonds issued mostly by Latin American countries in the late 1980s
- Brady–Belichick era, a period between 2001 and 2019 where the New England Patriots dominated the National Football League with quarterback Tom Brady and head coach Bill Belichick
- Brädi (born 1979), Finnish hip hop artist
- Bradie (disambiguation), a given name and surname
- Braidy Industries, an American aluminum alloy manufacturer
