= Northeastern University Club Powerlifting Team =

Competitive men's and women's club sport team

Northeastern Club Powerlifting
Status	Club sport
University	Northeastern University
Mascot	Huskies
Association	USA Powerlifting (USAPL)
Division(s)	Raw, Equipped (Primary Focus)
Testing	Drug-tested (USAPL Compliant)
Founded	2007 (men's team), 2009 (women's team)
Head Coach	Kate Driscoll
Location	Boston, Massachusetts
Nickname	Huskies
Colors	Red and Black

The Northeastern University Powerlifting Club (NUPL) comprises the competitive men's and women's club sport teams representing Northeastern University in Boston, Massachusetts. The club currently competes in USA Powerlifting (USAPL) collegiate events, which follow drug-testing standards. Athletes compete in three lifts: the squat, bench press, and deadlift, with their competition total determined by the highest successful attempt in each lift. While the club trains and competes in both raw and equipped styles, it competes primarily in equipped lifting divisions.

The program established its men's team in 2007, followed by the addition of the women's team in 2009. The club conducts its primary team training at the Cabot Center on Northeastern's campus, and the team is currently led by head coach Kate Driscoll.

== Competition and affiliations ==
Northeastern competes in both raw and equipped powerlifting. In raw powerlifting, competitors may use supportive accessories such as lifting belts, wrist wraps, and knee sleeves, but not specialized supportive suits or shirts. Equipped powerlifting allows additional equipment, including knee wraps, squat suits, bench press shirts, and deadlift suits, which provide mechanical support and are designed to increase the amount of weight an athlete can lift. According to the women's team's 2025-2026 bylaws, members participate in raw competitions during the fall and equipped competitions during the spring, including USA Powerlifting Collegiate Nationals.

USA Powerlifting was previously the United States member federation of the International Powerlifting Federation (IPF). The organizations separated in November 2021, after the IPF expelled USAPL following a dispute concerning the regulation of performance-enhancing drugs. Since the separation, USAPL has operated independently, and Powerlifting America has taken over as the IPF's United States member federation.. During their affiliation, Northeastern's women's team competed in the inaugural IPF University Powerlifting World Cup in 2016. Northeastern continues to participate in USAPL collegiate competitions.

== Teams and membership ==
The Northeastern University Powerlifting Club consists of separate men's and women's teams. For the 2026-2027 academic year, the club has a combined roster of 52 athletes, comprising 23 members of the women's team and 29 members of the men's team, according to Northeastern University's official club sports roster listings as of October 2026.

The team holds tryouts at the beginning of the fall semester. According to the women's team's 2025-2026 bylaws, tryouts take place over a two-week period. The initial stage focuses on movement preparation, conditioning, and evaluating teamwork and coachability. Following an initial round of selections, remaining candidates are tested for three-rep maxes for the squat, bench press, and deadlift. Final roster selections are determined by the team's executive board, with input from the coaching staff. Selection criteria include strength, coachability, teamwork, and determination. Returning members must also partake in the team's annual tryout process.

== Competitive achievements ==
=== Northeastern University Women's Powerlifting Team ===
In April 2016, the Northeastern University women's powerlifting team won the raw division of the USA Powerlifting Collegiate National Championships. The victory automatically qualified the team for the inaugural International Powerlifting Federation (IPF) University Powerlifting World Cup, help in Minsk, Belarus, in July 2016.

At the World Cup, Northeastern won the women's team competition, competing against athletes from 22 colleges and universities representing 11 countries. Five of Northeastern's seven competitors finished first in their respective weight classes. The team's performances included the three highest individual lifting totals of the competition, achieved by Monet Bland, Binglei Zhou, and Kelsey McCarthy.

At the 2026 USA Powerlifting Collegiate National Championships, held in April in New Orleans, Louisiana, the Northeastern women's team placed second nationally among 16 teams in the equipped division, earning 57 team points. The team finished behind Midland University, which won the division with 84 points. Northeastern athlete Joy Li placed first in her weight class.

=== Northeastern University Men's Powerlifting Team ===
At the 2026 USA Powerlifting Collegiate National Championships, held in April in New Orleans, Louisiana, the Northeastern men's team placed fifth among 31 teams listed in the equipped division, earning 44 team points.
