= Big E (wrestler) =

American professional wrestler (born 1986)

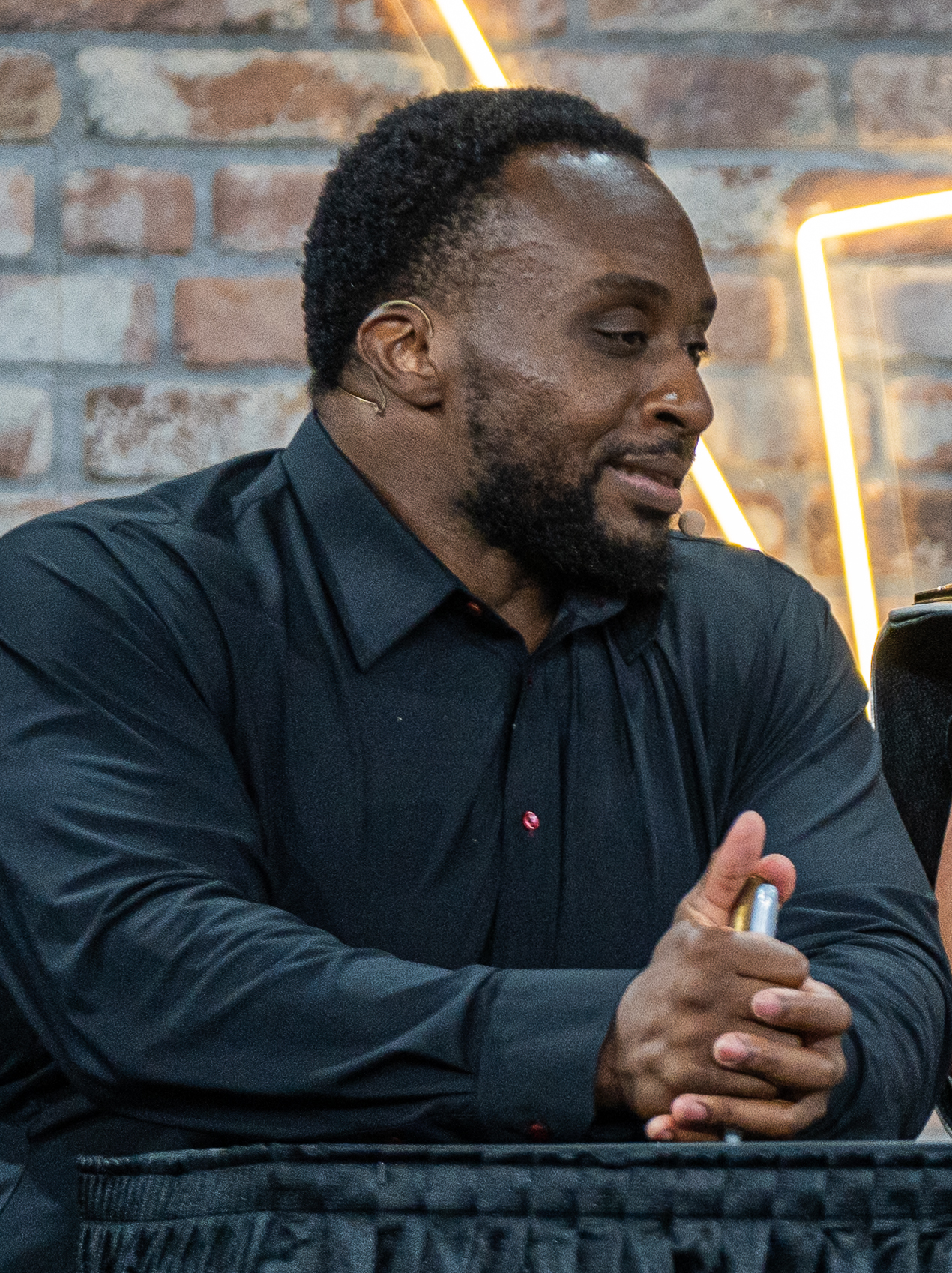
- Big E in 2024

Personal information
- Born: Ettore Ewen; March 1, 1986 (age 40) Tampa, Florida, U.S.
- Education: University of Iowa
- Spouse: Kris Yim (m. 2026)
- Relative: Mia Yim (sister-in-law)

Professional wrestling career
- Ring name(s): Big E Big E Langston
- Billed height: 5 ft 11 in (180 cm)
- Billed weight: 285 lb (129 kg)
- Billed from: Tampa, Florida
- Trained by: Florida Championship Wrestling; NXT
- Debut: December 17, 2009
- Retired: October 9, 2025

Ettore Ewen (born March 1, 1986), known professionally under the ring name Big E, is an American broadcaster, retired professional wrestler and former powerlifter. He is signed to WWE, where he primarily appears as a panelist and analyst as well as a media spokesperson for the company. He is best known for performing in the company as an in-ring competitor from 2009 to 2022, as well as being a member of the New Day stable alongside Kofi Kingston and Xavier Woods, with whom he became a six-time Smackdown Tag Team Champion and two-time Raw Tag Team Champion. After suffering a cervical fracture during a match in March 2022, Ewen moved away from in-ring competition and ultimately announced his retirement in 2025.

Ewen was a collegiate football player at the University of Iowa and later became a powerlifter and a USA Powerlifting champion. He also won a state championship in high-school wrestling. Upon signing with WWE in 2009, Ewen was assigned to its developmental brand Florida Championship Wrestling (FCW) under the ring name Big E Langston. After FCW was rebranded to NXT, he became the second-ever NXT Champion. He was promoted to WWE's main roster in December 2012, had his name shortened to simply Big E, and joined the New Day in 2014. As a part of The New Day, he holds the tandem record for the longest Raw Tag Team Championship reign at 483 days.

In 2020, Ewen resumed his singles career and was eventually separated from his New Day teammates in the 2020 WWE Draft. He won the men's Money in the Bank ladder match in 2021, before successfully cashing it in later that year to win the WWE Championship, becoming the 33rd Triple Crown Champion in the company's history. Additionally, he is a two-time Intercontinental Champion.

== Early life ==
Ettore Ewen was born in Tampa, Florida, on March 1, 1986, the son of Margaret and Ettore Ewen. He is of Jamaican and Montserratian descent. Ewen attended middle school starting in 7th grade and High School at Tampa Preparatory School in Tampa, where he won a number of athletic honors, including a state championship in wrestling. After his junior year of high school he transferred to Wharton High School in order to play football and was named Hillsborough County's "Ironman of the Year". Upon graduating, Ewen attended the University of Iowa, where he played American football as a defensive lineman for the Iowa Hawkeyes. He redshirted in 2004 and missed the 2005 season due to an injury sustained in preseason camp, playing a single season as a sophomore in 2006. He graduated with a Bachelor of Arts degree. After college, Ewen turned his attention to the sport of powerlifting.

== Powerlifting career ==
Competition record

Powerlifting

Representing United States

USAPL U.S. Open Powerlifting Championships
1st	2010	125kg

USAPL RAW National Powerlifting Championships
1st	2011	+125kg

Ewen competed in his first USA Powerlifting (USAPL) meet on July 11 at the 2010 United States Open Championships at Nova Southeastern University in Davie, Florida. He became the top heavyweight lifter, breaking all four Florida state raw powerlifting records in the 275-pound class and besting raw national records in the deadlift and total. His lifts included a 611-pound squat, a 490-pound bench press, and a 749-pound deadlift for a 1,850 pound raw total. Ewen also won the 2011 USAPL Raw Nationals in Scranton, Pennsylvania. This time, he competed in the super heavyweight division (275+lbs) and broke the raw American and national records in the deadlift (799 lbs) and total (2,039 lbs). All of his national and American raw records have since been broken.

=== Personal records ===
Set in official competition

- Squat – 711 lbs (322.5 kg) raw without knee wraps
- Bench press – 529 lbs (240 kg) raw
- Deadlift – 799 lbs (362.5 kg) raw
- Powerlifting total – 2,039 lbs 925 kg (322.5-240-362.5) raw without knee wraps

== Professional wrestling career ==
=== World Wrestling Entertainment/WWE (2009–present) ===
==== Florida Championship Wrestling and NXT (2009–2012) ====
After injuries ended Ewen's dreams of being a professional footballer, he was introduced to professional wrestling by someone who knew Jim Ross. At the suggestion of said person, Ewen was given a tryout in Florida Championship Wrestling (FCW), a developmental territory of World Wrestling Entertainment (WWE). He signed a developmental contract with WWE in 2009. According to Ewen, although he had been a wrestling fan as a child, he had "never thought this [was] something you could do for a living, and I would never have. ... Thankfully I was in the right place and the right time, and it's something that I have developed a passion for."

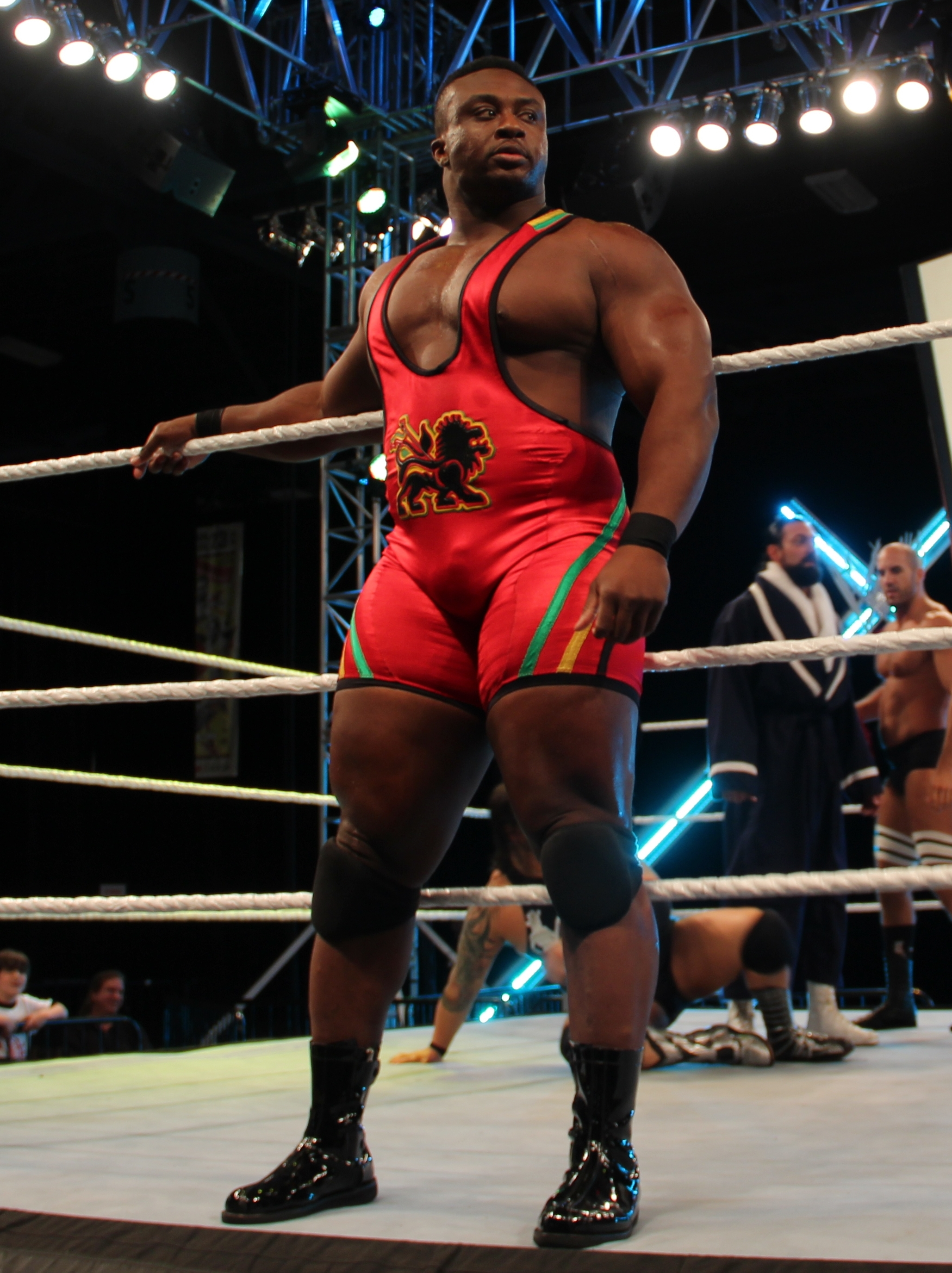
Langston at WrestleMania Axxess in April 2012

Ewen worked for FCW from 2009 to 2012 under the ring name Big E Langston, where he won FCW Florida Tag Team Championship with Calvin Raines. When WWE rebranded FCW into NXT, Langston appeared on NXT. During his first month in NXT, he had a winning streak and also demanded that referees count to five (rather than the usual three) before awarding him pinfalls. He also had a storyline with Vickie Guerrero, who promised a $5,000 bounty on Langston after he rejected her serviced as manager. Langston then began to feud with The Shield, and on the January 9, 2013 episode of NXT, Langston defeated The Shield member Seth Rollins in a No Disqualification match to win the NXT Championship. After successful title defenses against Conor O'Brian, Corey Graves, Brad Maddox, and Damien Sandow, Langston eventually lost the NXT Championship to Bo Dallas on the June 12 episode of NXT, ending his title reign at 168 days, although WWE recognizes his reign at 153 days due to the episode airing on tape delay.

==== Main roster, Intercontinental champion (2012-2014) ====
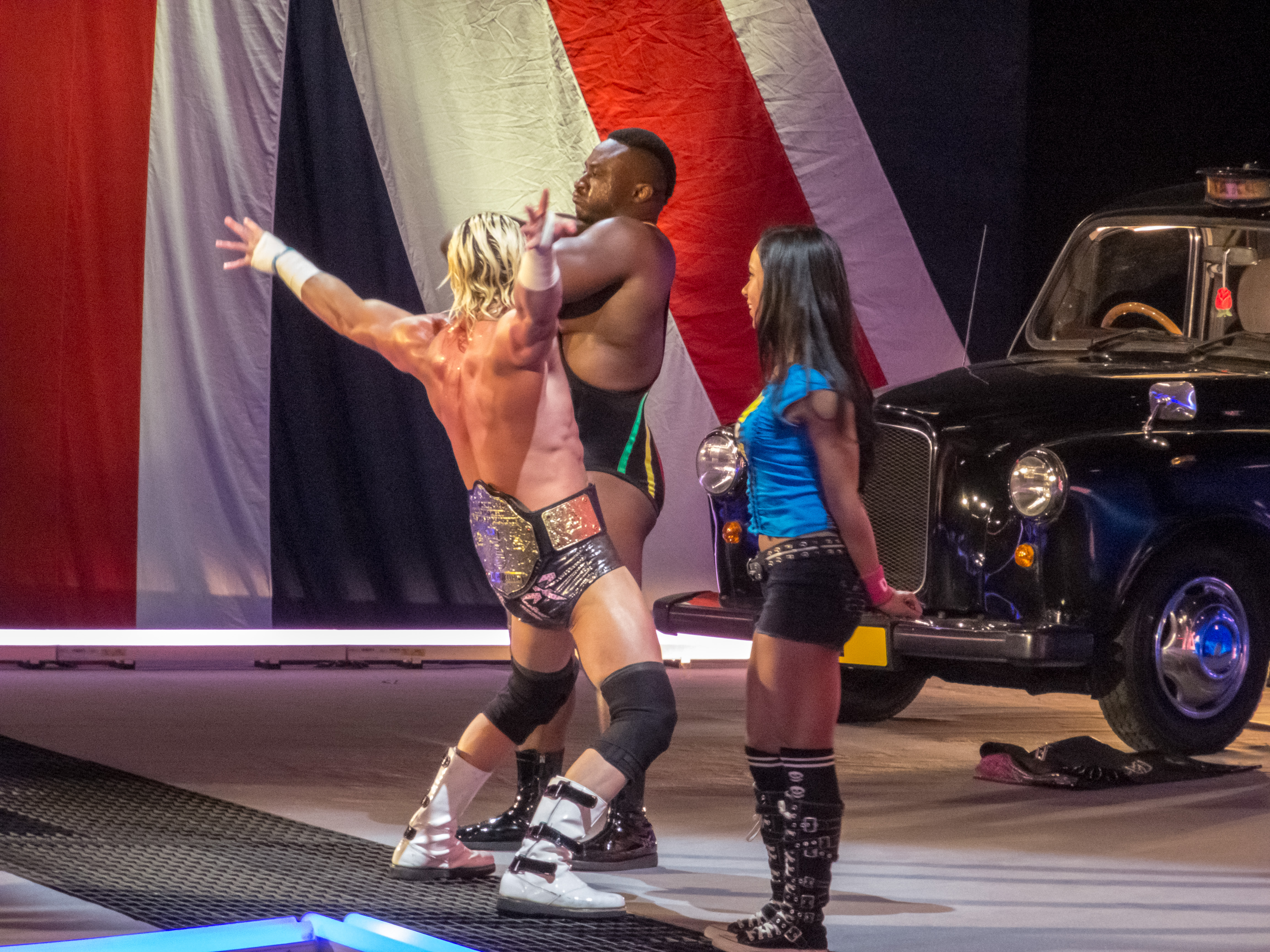
Langston (back) with World Heavyweight Champion Dolph Ziggler (center) and their manager AJ Lee (foreground) in April 2013

On the December 17, 2012 episode of Raw, Langston made his main roster debut by attacking John Cena and aligning with AJ Lee, thus establishing himself as a heel. Langston went on to act as an enforcer for AJ's boyfriend, Dolph Ziggler. On April 7, 2013, at WrestleMania 29, Langston and Ziggler unsuccessfully challenged Team Hell No (Daniel Bryan and Kane) for the WWE Tag Team Championship. Langston wrestled his first singles match on Raw the following night, defeating Daniel Bryan. After Ziggler suffered a concussion in May, Langston competed in a best-of-five series against Ziggler's opponent for the World Heavyweight Championship, Alberto Del Rio, which Del Rio won 3–2. On the June 10 episode of Raw, Langston was revealed as the secret admirer of Divas Champion Kaitlyn; this in turn was revealed to be a ploy by AJ Lee, the number one contender to Kaitlyn's title, to humiliate Kaitlyn. Langston and AJ continued to mock Kaitlyn over the following weeks, with AJ ultimately winning the title at Payback on June 16.

On the July 15 episode of Raw, Ziggler ended his relationship with AJ, which led to Langston attacking him later in the evening. On the July 29 episode of Raw, Langston lost to Ziggler by disqualification after AJ interfered and attacked Ziggler. In a rematch on the following week's Raw, Langston defeated Ziggler following a distraction by AJ. On August 18 at SummerSlam, Langston and AJ were defeated by Ziggler and Kaitlyn in a mixed tag team match, effectively ending their feud.

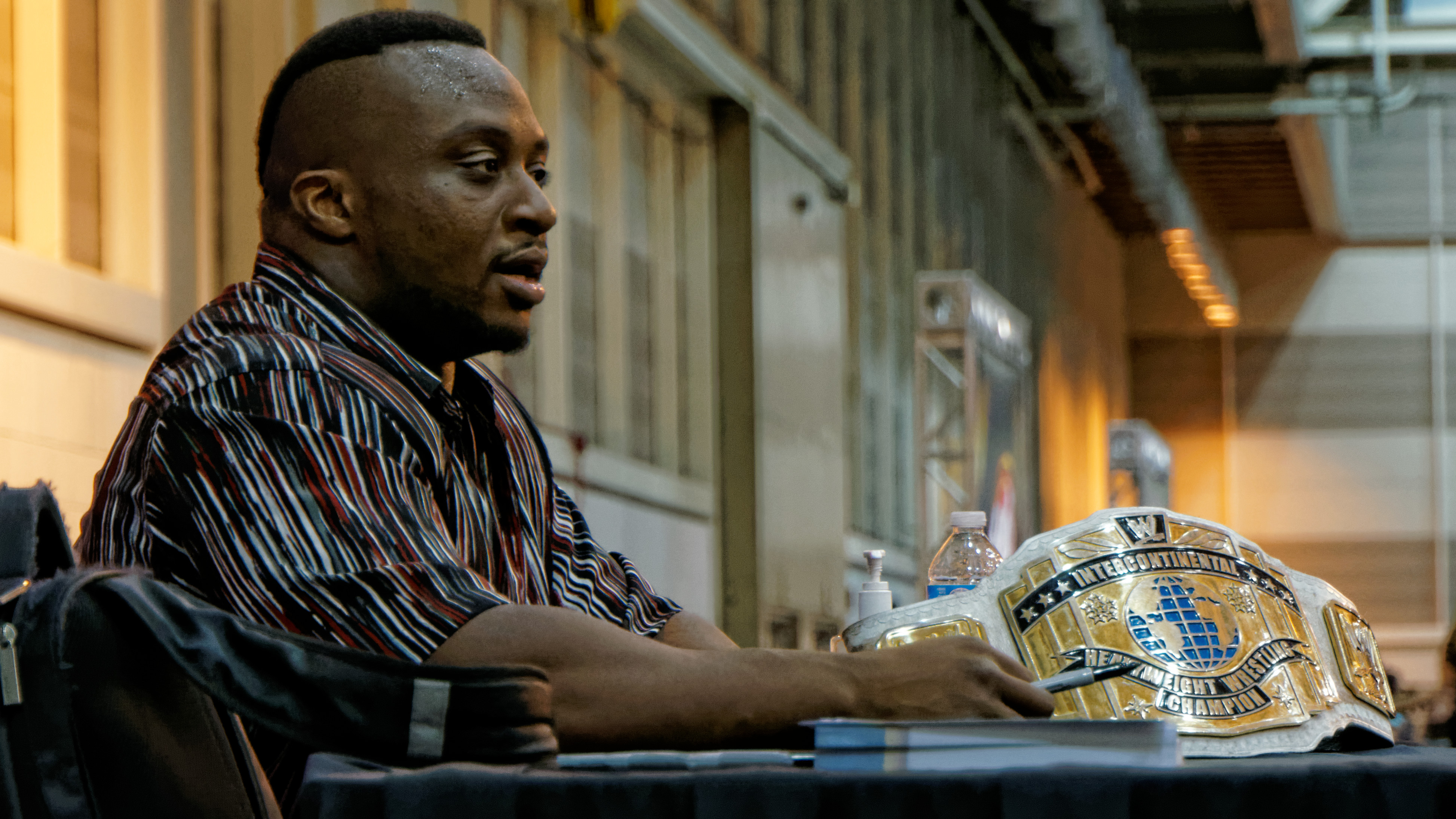
Big E as Intercontinental Champion in 2014

On the October 18 episode of SmackDown, Langston faced off against CM Punk in a match, where he lost. Afterwards, Paul Heyman came down to the ring and began downplaying Punk's victory over Langston by calling Langston a "marginal at best rookie", and then sent Curtis Axel and Ryback to the ring to attack Punk. Langston, having taken offense towards Heyman's words then aided Punk in fending off Axel and Ryback, turning face in the process. Three days later, on the October 21 episode of Raw, Langston teamed up with Punk to defeat Axel and Ryback, with Langston pinning Axel. He was set to receive an Intercontinental Championship match against Axel at Hell in a Cell on October 27, but Axel was pulled from the match shortly before the pay-per-view due to a legitimate hip injury. Langston instead challenged for the United States Championship against Dean Ambrose, winning by countout. The following night on Raw, he was granted a rematch for the title, winning the match by disqualification after Roman Reigns and Seth Rollins interfered.

On the November 18 episode of Raw, Langston received his postponed championship match with Axel and won the Intercontinental Championship, his first singles championship on the main roster. At Survivor Series on November 24, Langston successfully retained his title against Axel. Langston then successfully retained his championship against Damien Sandow on December 15 at TLC: Tables, Ladders & Chairs. On January 26, 2014, at the Royal Rumble, Langston participated in the Royal Rumble match, but was eliminated by Sheamus. At Elimination Chamber on February 23, with his ring name now shortened to Big E, he successfully defended the title against Jack Swagger. At WrestleMania XXX on April 6, Big E competed in the Andre the Giant Memorial Battle Royal, which was won by Cesaro. On May 4, at Extreme Rules, Big E lost the title to Bad News Barrett, and failed to regain it the following night on Raw, ending his reign at 167 days. Big E later became involved in a feud with Rusev, which led to consecutive bouts at Payback on June 1 and Money in the Bank on June 29, both of which Big E lost. At Battleground on July 20, Big E competed in a battle royal for the Intercontinental Championship, which was won by The Miz.

==== The New Day (2014–2020) ====
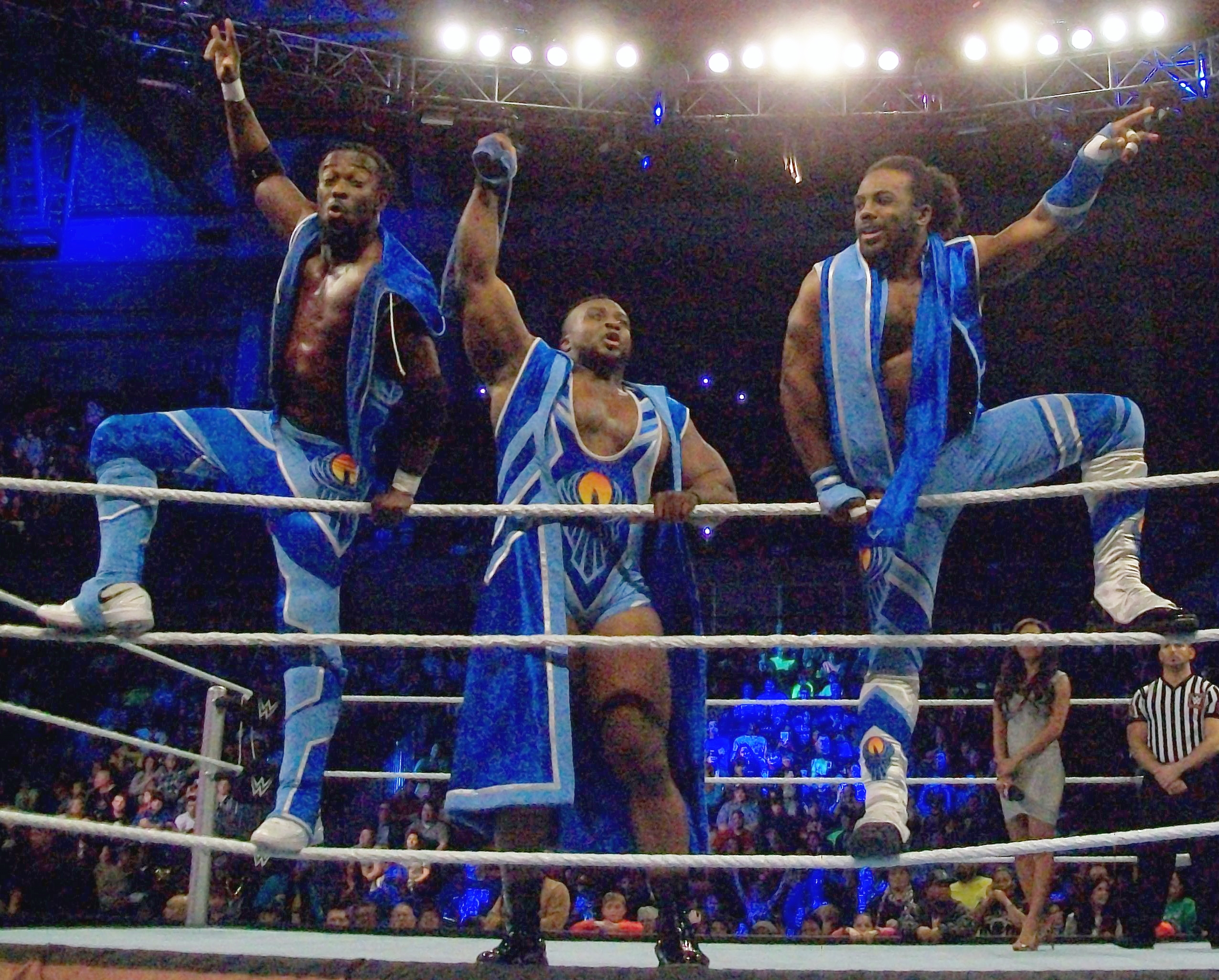
Big E (center) with Kofi Kingston and Xavier Woods as The New Day in January 2015

During the summer of 2014, Big E was put in a team with Kofi Kingston, and on the July 21 episode of Raw, they lost a tag team match against Ryback and Curtis Axel (known as RybAxel) in what had been a recent losing streak. Xavier Woods then came down to the ring to address them by stating that they could not "move ahead by kissing babies, shaking hands, and singing and dancing like a puppet", and that now is "their time to shine", and that they "do not ask any longer", but "take", and offered to form a stable. The duo accepted Woods' offer, and on the next day's Main Event, Woods managed Big E and Kingston to a decisive victory over Heath Slater and Titus O'Neil (Slater-Gator). The trio then temporarily separated as on the August 8 episode of SmackDown, both Big E and Kingston reverted to wrestling singles matches with no sign or mention of the other two members of the group. Despite being separated on WWE television, Big E, Kingston and Woods continued their alliance at house shows.

In November, WWE began airing vignettes for Big E, Kingston and Woods, with the stable now being billed as The New Day, and presented as overly-positive-minded babyface characters. The New Day made their in-ring debut on the November 28 episode of SmackDown in a winning effort against Curtis Axel, Heath Slater and Titus O'Neil. They started a brief feud with Gold and Stardust, which Big E and Kingston defeated Gold and Stardust at the TLC: Tables, Ladders & Chairs on December 14. On January 25, 2015, at the Royal Rumble, The New Day lost to Tyson Kidd and Cesaro, ending their winning streak. Later that night, Big E participated in the Royal Rumble match, but was eliminated by Rusev. At WrestleMania 31 on March 29, they failed to win the WWE Tag Team Championship in a fatal four-way match, as well as being eliminated by Big Show in the Andre the Giant Memorial Battle Royal.

On the April 6 episode of Raw, The New Day turned heel, after fans responded negatively to the group. At Extreme Rules on April 26, Big E and Kingston defeated Tyson Kidd and Cesaro to win the WWE Tag Team Championships. On May 17, at Payback, The New Day defeated Kidd and Cesaro to retain their titles. At Elimination Chamber on May 31, The New Day retained the titles in the first ever tag team Elimination Chamber match, and all three members were allowed to compete in a pre-match stipulation. On June 14, they lost the titles at Money in the Bank against The Prime Time Players (Darren Young and Titus O'Neil), but they would regain the titles at SummerSlam on August 23. The following night on Raw, they started a feud with The Dudley Boyz (Bubba Ray Dudley and D-Von Dudley), setting up a title match at Night of Champions on September 20, where they lost by disqualification. At Hell in a Cell on October 25, they defeated The Dudley Boyz to retain their titles, ending their feud. At TLC: Tables, Ladders & Chairs on December 13, The New Day retained the title against The Usos (Jey Uso and Jimmy Uso) and The Lucha Dragons (Kalisto and Sin Cara) in a triple threat tag team ladder match. On January 24, 2016, at the Royal Rumble, they retained the title against The Usos.

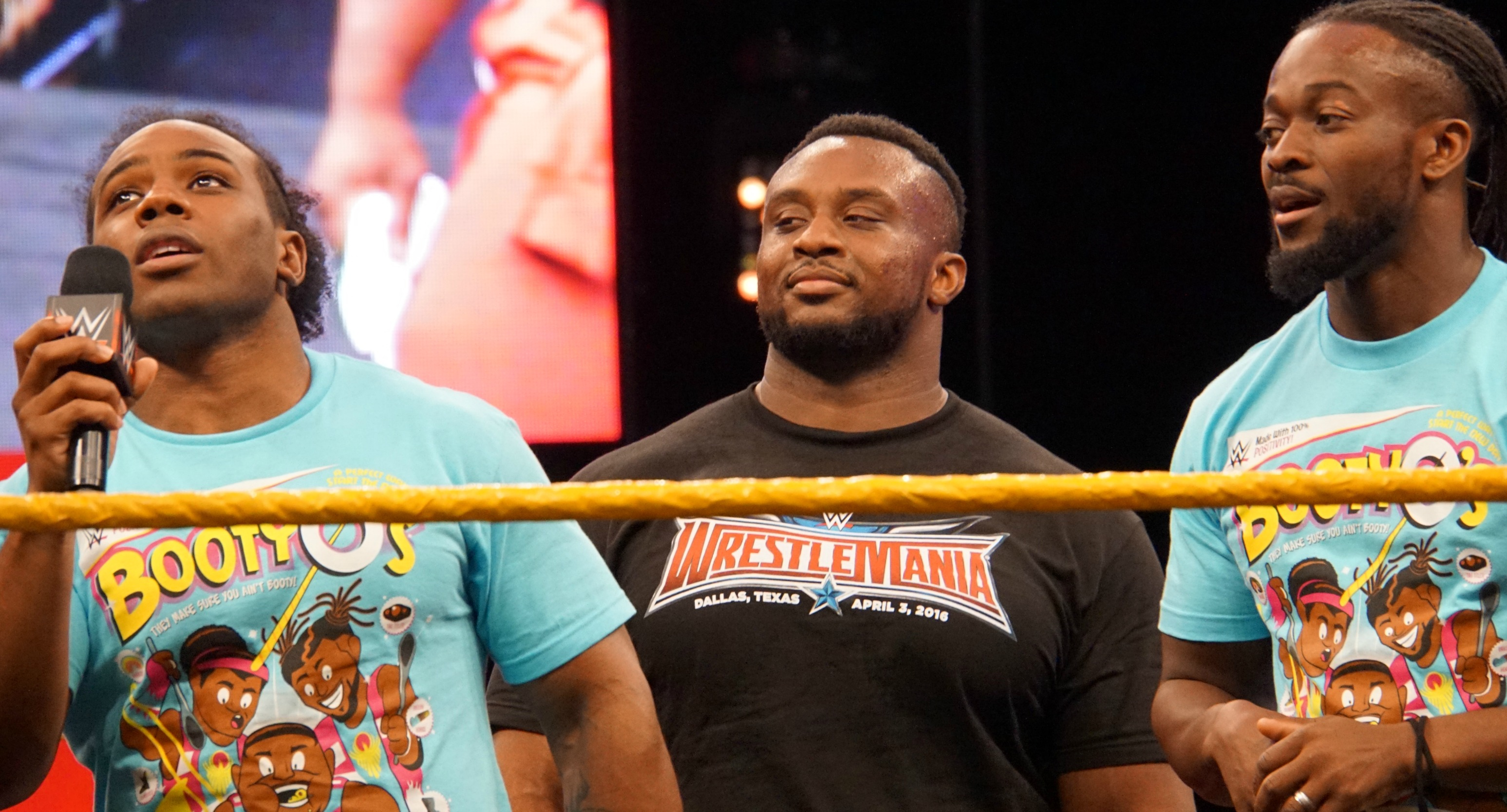
The New Day during the WrestleMania Axxess in April 2016

At Fastlane on February 21, The New Day turned face by mocking The League of Nations (Sheamus, Alberto Del Rio, Rusev, and King Barrett), starting a feud. They retained their titles at Roadblock on March 12 against The League of Nations. On April 3, at WrestleMania 32, The New Day were defeated by The League of Nations in a six-man tag team match. The following night on Raw, they successfully retained their title against The League of Nations, ending their feud. After WrestleMania, they retained their title at Extreme Rules on May 22 against The Vaudevillains (Aiden English and Simon Gotch), and at Money in the Bank on June 19 against The Vaudevillains, Enzo Amore and Big Cass, and Luke Gallows and Karl Anderson in a fatal-four-way match.

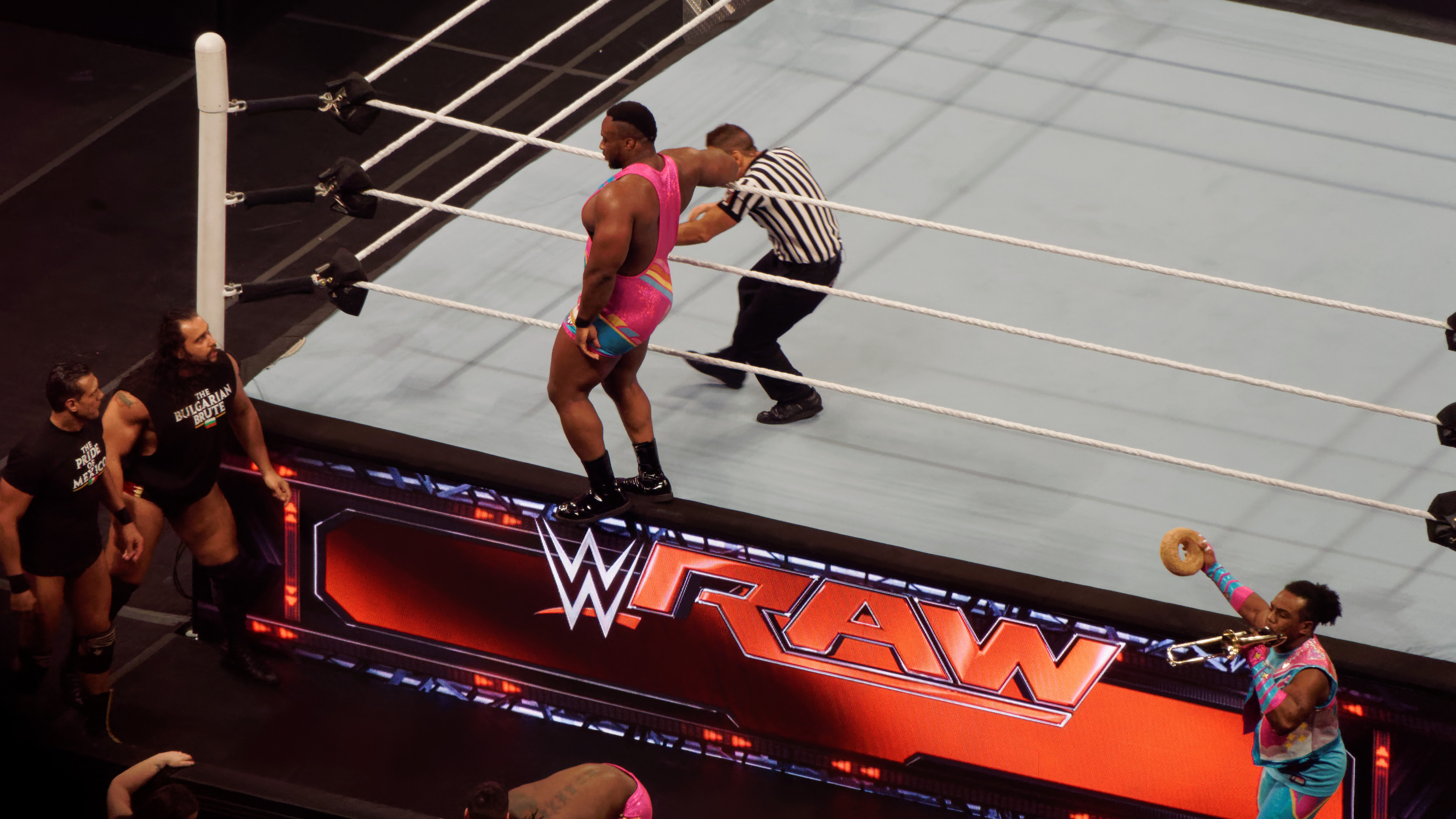
The New Day during a match against The League of Nations's Sheamus and King Barrett in April 2016

On July 19 at the 2016 WWE draft, Big E, along with his fellow New Day teammates, was drafted to the Raw brand. Three days later, on July 22, The New Day became the longest-reigning WWE Tag Team Champions, breaking the record of 331 days previously set by Paul London and Brian Kendrick. After SmackDown established the WWE SmackDown Tag Team Championships due to the brand split, the titles held by the New Day were renamed the WWE Raw Tag Team Championships. On the August 1 episode of Raw, Big E suffered a storyline contusion to the groin area after an attack by Luke Gallows and Karl Anderson. At SummerSlam on August 21, Big E returned from injury by attacking Gallows and Anderson during their match against Kingston and Woods, resulting in Gallows and Anderson winning by disqualification. At Clash of Champions on September 25, The New Day retained the titles against Gallows and Anderson. On October 30, at Hell in a Cell, The New Day lost to the team of Cesaro and Sheamus by disqualification but retained the titles. The next night on Raw, The New Day revealed that they were made captain of Team Raw for the 10–on–10 Survivor Series Tag Team Elimination match at Survivor Series on November 20, 2016, which Team Raw won after defeating Team SmackDown. The New Day had two successful title defenses on the November 21 and 28 editions of Raw against Cesaro and Sheamus and Gallows and Anderson, respectively. On the December 12 episode of Raw, The New Day retained the titles in two triple threat tag team matches, first involving Gallows and Anderson and Cesaro and Sheamus and the second involving Chris Jericho and Kevin Owens and the team of Roman Reigns and Seth Rollins. At Roadblock: End of the Line on December 18, The New Day lost the Raw Tag Team Championship to Cesaro and Sheamus, ending their record-breaking championship reign at 483 days. On January 29, all members were in the Royal Rumble match but were eliminated by Sheamus and Cesaro. On February 20, 2017, they were announced as the hosts of WrestleMania 33.

On April 11, 2017, Big E and The New Day were moved to the SmackDown brand as part of the Superstar Shake-up. At Battleground on July 23, Kingston and Woods, representing The New Day, defeated The Usos to win the SmackDown Tag Team Championships for the first time. Though Big E did not wrestle himself, due to The New Day defending the titles under the Freebird Rule, Big E is also recognized as a champion. The New Day lost the tag titles back to The Usos at SummerSlam on August 20. The Usos held the titles for about a month before The New Day won them back on SmackDown Live that September. At Hell in a Cell on October 8, Big E and Woods took on The Usos in the namesake match but lost the championships. On the October 23 edition of Raw, The New Day along with other talents of SmackDown ambushed the Raw wrestlers. They again appeared on the November 6 episode of Raw in the crowd, which led to the distraction of Seth Rollins and Dean Ambrose and costing them the tag titles. On the November 14 edition of SmackDown, The Shield led an attack with Raw Superstars and invaded SmackDown similar to the one led by SmackDown and attacked everyone including New Day. At Survivor Series on November 19, The New Day lost to The Shield. The New Day failed to regain the titles from The Usos at Clash of Champions on December 17 in a fatal four-way tag team match also involving the team of Rusev and Aiden English, and Chad Gable and Shelton Benjamin. On January 28, Big E entered the 2018 Royal Rumble match as the ninth entrant but failed to win the match after being eliminated by Jinder Mahal.

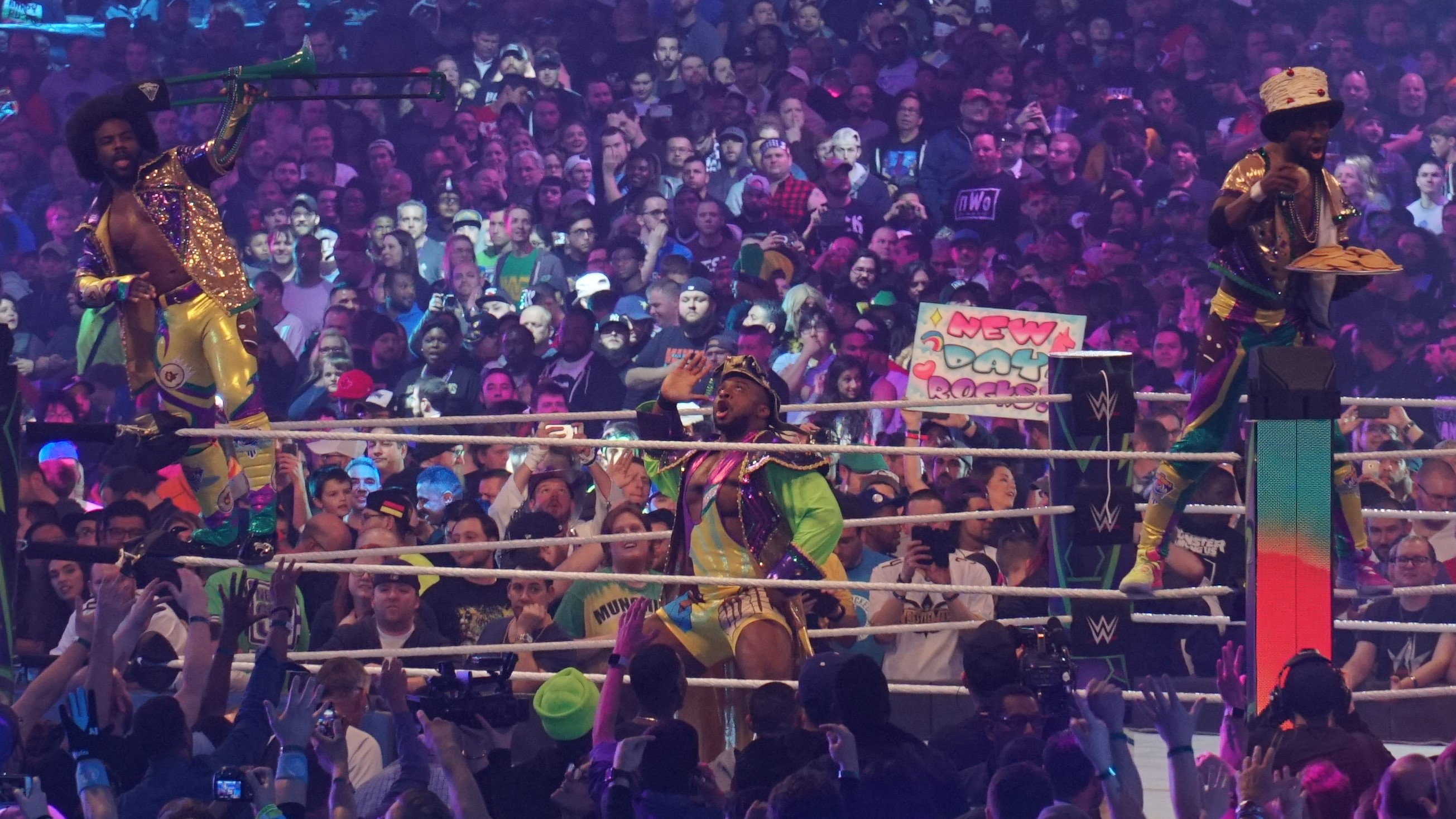
The New Day at WrestleMania 34 in April 2018

At Fastlane on March 11, The New Day faced The Usos for the SmackDown Tag Team Championship, but the match went to a no-contest after interference from The Bludgeon Brothers. On April 8, at WrestleMania 34, The New Day faced the Usos and the Bludgeon Brothers in a triple threat tag team match for the titles, which were won by The Bludgeon Brothers. On July 15, The New Day were defeated by SAnitY in a six-man tables match at the Extreme Rules pre-show. The New Day then competed in a tag team title tournament, defeating SAnitY in the first round, while Cesaro and Sheamus defeated the Usos. The New Day then defeated Cesaro and Sheamus the following week on SmackDown to earn the right to face The Bludgeon Brothers at SummerSlam on August 19, where they won the match by disqualification, meaning the Bludgeon Brothers retained their titles. Two days later on SmackDown, however, The New Day defeated The Bludgeon Brothers in a No Disqualification match to capture the titles for the third time. Big E and Woods then represented the New Day when they unsuccessfully defended their tag titles against The Bar on SmackDown 1000.

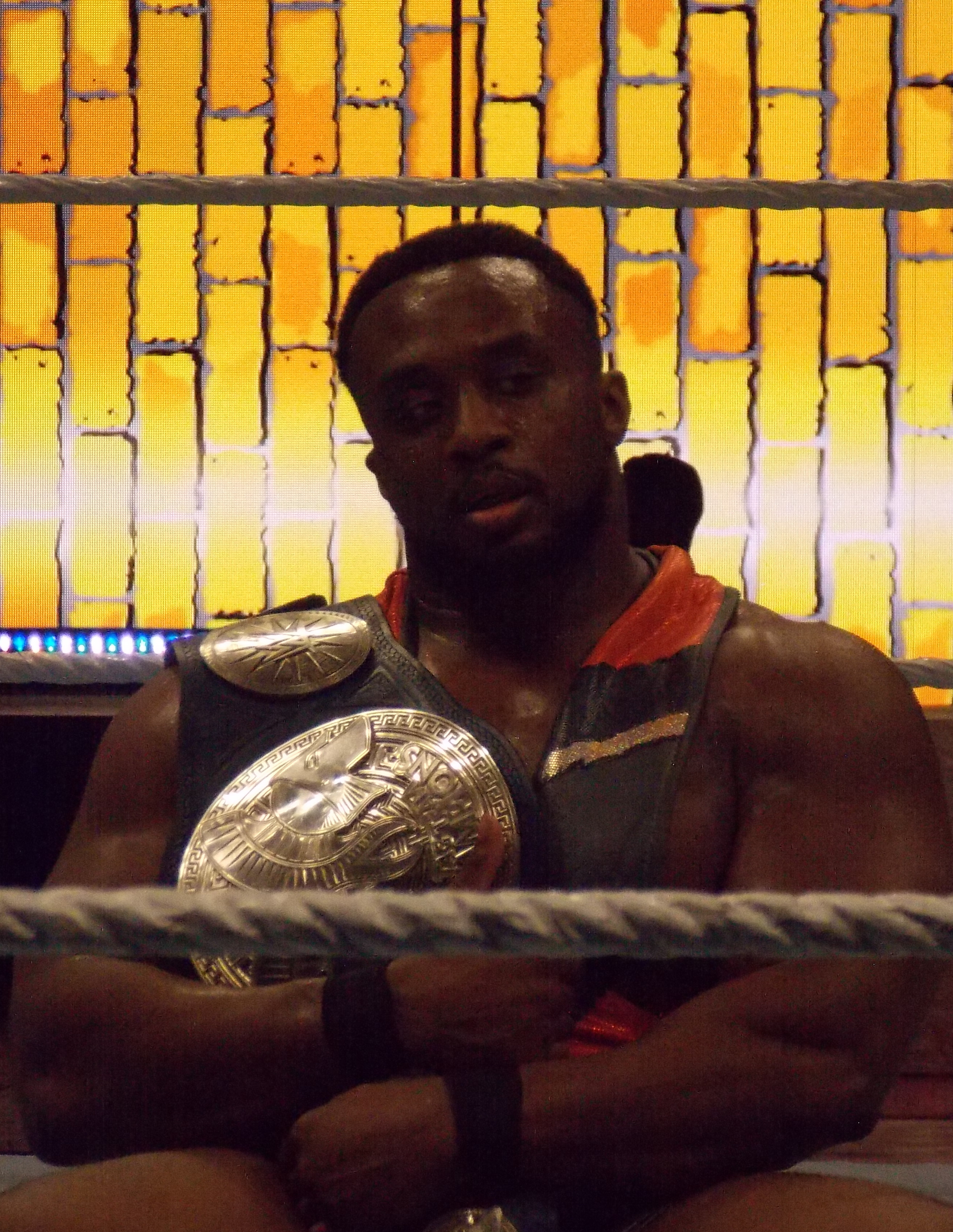
Big E at a house show in August 2019

On January 27, Big E entered the 2019 Royal Rumble, but was eliminated by Samoa Joe. In the lead-up to WrestleMania 35, Big E's New Day teammate Kofi Kingston was attempting to earn a shot at the WWE Championship and after many attempts, WWE Chairman Vince McMahon granted him the title shot after Big E and Xavier Woods defeated Luke Gallows and Karl Anderson, Shinsuke Nakamura and Rusev, The Bar, The Usos, and Daniel Bryan and Erick Rowan in a tag team gauntlet match. Shortly after WrestleMania, Big E suffered a legitimate knee injury which sidelined him for weeks. He later returned and earned another SmackDown tag team title opportunity at Extreme Rules on July 14, where Big E and Xavier Woods defeated Daniel Bryan and Erick Rowan, and Heavy Machinery to win the titles (during this reign, Kingston was not recognized as champion as he was the reigning WWE Champion). On September 15, they lost the titles to The Revival at Clash of Champions, but regained it on the November 8 episode of SmackDown, becoming record five-time champions as a team, and a record fifth reign for Big E individually (Woods is not recognized for this reign due to an injury). At TLC: Tables, Ladders & Chairs on December 15, Big E and Kingston successfully defended the titles against The Revival in a ladder match. On January 26, 2020, at the Royal Rumble, Big E participated in the Royal Rumble match but was eliminated by Brock Lesnar.

At Super ShowDown on February 27, Big E and Kingston lost the championships against John Morrison and the Miz and failed to regain the titles at Elimination Chamber on March 8. On the April 17 episode of SmackDown, Big E, who represented The New Day, won the titles back from Miz, who represented himself and Morrison, in a triple threat match, also involving Jey Uso, who represented The Usos, making The New Day six-time SmackDown Tag Team Champions. At The Horror Show at Extreme Rules on July 19, The New Day would lose the championships to Cesaro and Shinsuke Nakamura in a Tables match after Cesaro and Nakamura put Kingston through two tables.

==== Return to singles competition (2020–2021) ====
Since July 2020, Big E began to work as a singles wrestler, remaining on the SmackDown brand while Woods and Kingston were drafted to Raw due to the 2020 Draft in October. On the December 25 episode of SmackDown (taped on December 22), Big E defeated Sami Zayn in a lumberjack match to win the Intercontinental Championship for the second time. He started a feud with Apollo Crews, retaining the title at Fastlane, but losing the title at WrestleMania 37 in a Nigerian Drum Fight.

==== WWE Champion (2021–2022) ====
At Money in the Bank on July 18, he won the men's Money in the Bank ladder match and defeated Bobby Lashley on September 13, edition of Raw, to win the WWE Championship. On the September 27 episode of Raw, Big E defended the WWE Championship against Lashley, which ended in a disqualification after a brawl between the New Day and Cedric Alexander and Shelton Benjamin. The match was rescheduled as a cage match later that night, where Big E defeated Lashley to retain the title. As part of the 2021 WWE Draft, Big E was officially drafted to Raw, while Kingston and Woods were drafted to SmackDown. On October 21, Big E successfully defended the WWE Championship against Drew McIntyre at Crown Jewel. At Survivor Series on November 21, Big E suffered a clean loss to WWE Universal Champion Roman Reigns in a non-title match.

Big E lost the title to Brock Lesnar at the WWE Day 1 event in a Fatal Five-Way match, ending Big E's reign at 110 days. In an interview published in March 2022, Ewen gave his views on his WWE Championship reign, stating that if it were up to him, he would choose a "longer" reign so that he could "do some more dynamic things". Ewen further stated that it was "difficult [for people] to really latch onto a new champion" when "within their first month, [the champion has] multiple losses on TV". Ewen then compared his world title reign and how it ended to Kofi Kingston's, suggesting that both of them had a "falling off of a cliff feeling at the hands of one Brock Lesnar and then suddenly, it feels like you woke up a year prior and you're back to doing what you were doing before."

==== Final matches, cervical spine injury and non-wrestling roles (2022–present) ====
In late January 2022, Big E was officially moved back to SmackDown, reuniting with Kofi Kingston as part of The New Day. On the March 11 episode of SmackDown, during a match against Ridge Holland and Sheamus, Holland delivered an overhead belly-to-belly suplex to Big E at ringside, resulting in Big E accidentally landing on the top of his head; suffering a broken neck, with fractures to his C1 and C6 vertebrae, but no ligament or spinal cord injury, so he did not require surgery. He had an onscreen reunion with Kingston and Woods on May 20, but stated in an interview one month later that it was unclear if he would ever be able to wrestle again. Following his recovery, Big E appeared as a host, guest, or panelist on various WWE shows.

In August 2023, Ewen revealed that he had been advised by doctors never to wrestle again despite having no nerve damage or strength issues. Two years after the incident, he stated on X that his neck had healed fibrously but failed to build new bone structure, concluding that he was not medically cleared and unlikely to ever be cleared.

On the December 2, 2024 episode of Raw during the 10-year anniversary celebration of The New Day's formation, Big E made an in-ring reunion with Kingston and Woods for the first time since his injury. Due to the dissension between the two throughout the year, Big E announced that he will return to manage them. However, the duo lashed out at Big E for supposedly "abandoning" them after his injury and kicked him out of the stable, turning Kingston and Woods heel for the first time since 2016. On October 9, 2025, Big E formally announced his retirement from in-ring competition.

== Professional wrestling style ==
Ewen's finisher move is the Big Ending, which he described as an RKO to the body. The move was suggested by Curt Hawkins in 2009.

== Personal life ==
In a December 2024 essay for The Players' Tribune, Ewen wrote that he "grew up fearing [his] dad," a conservative preacher who was physically and emotionally abusive. He also discussed his long-term struggle with severe depression, which began in early childhood. During an October 9, 2025 interview on What’s Your Story? with Stephanie McMahon, Ewen further recalled experiencing depressive thoughts by age nine, stating that he "was not comfortable in [his] skin." His condition worsened during his college football career following a series of injuries, and he was later diagnosed with major depression with psychotic features. Ewen underwent therapy and was prescribed antidepressant and antipsychotic medications, and at one point was hospitalized in a psychiatric ward at the University of Iowa. Despite achieving professional success with The New Day, he continued to experience suicidal thoughts. Ewen credited therapy, meditation, and mindfulness with helping him manage his mental health, citing daily meditation beginning in the COVID-19 pandemic as a significant turning point in his recovery. In a 2026 TEDx talk, Ewen said his practice had also helped him let go of his "burning resentment" towards his father and, later, to accept his career-ending neck injury.

On May 5, 2025, Ewen announced his engagement to Kris Yim, the sister of fellow professional wrestler Mia Yim. The couple were married on October 21, 2026.

== Filmography ==
=== Television ===
Year	Title	Role	Notes
2015	Total Divas	Himself	Guest star
2016	Swerved	Himself	
2016	Ride Along	Himself	
2016	Let's Make a Deal	Himself	Guest star (with the New Day)
2019–2021	Lazor Wulf	Canon Wulf (voice)	Main role
2023	Weakest Link	Himself	
2023	Hot Wheels: Ultimate Challenge	Himself	Episode: "Mardi Gras Mania vs. The Reaper"
2024	Laid	Stu Jackward	Episode: “FB to the T”
2025	Your Friendly Neighborhood Spider-Man	Bulldozer	
2026	Hell's Kitchen	Himself	2 episodes

=== Film ===
Year	Title	Role	Notes
2016	Countdown	Himself	
2021	Escape the Undertaker	Himself	Main star

=== Video games ===
Year	Title	As	Notes
2013	WWE 2K14	Big E Langston	Downloadable content
2014	WWE 2K15	Big E	
2015	WWE 2K16	Big E	
2016	WWE 2K17	Big E	
2017	WWE 2K18	Big E	
2018	WWE 2K19	Big E	
2019	WWE 2K20	Big E	
2020	WWE 2K Battlegrounds	Big E	
2020	Gears 5	Big E	Downloadable content
2022	WWE 2K22	Big E	
2023	WWE 2K23	Big E	
2024	WWE 2K24	Big E	
2025	WWE 2K25	Big E	
2026	WWE 2K26	Big E	

== Championships and accomplishments ==
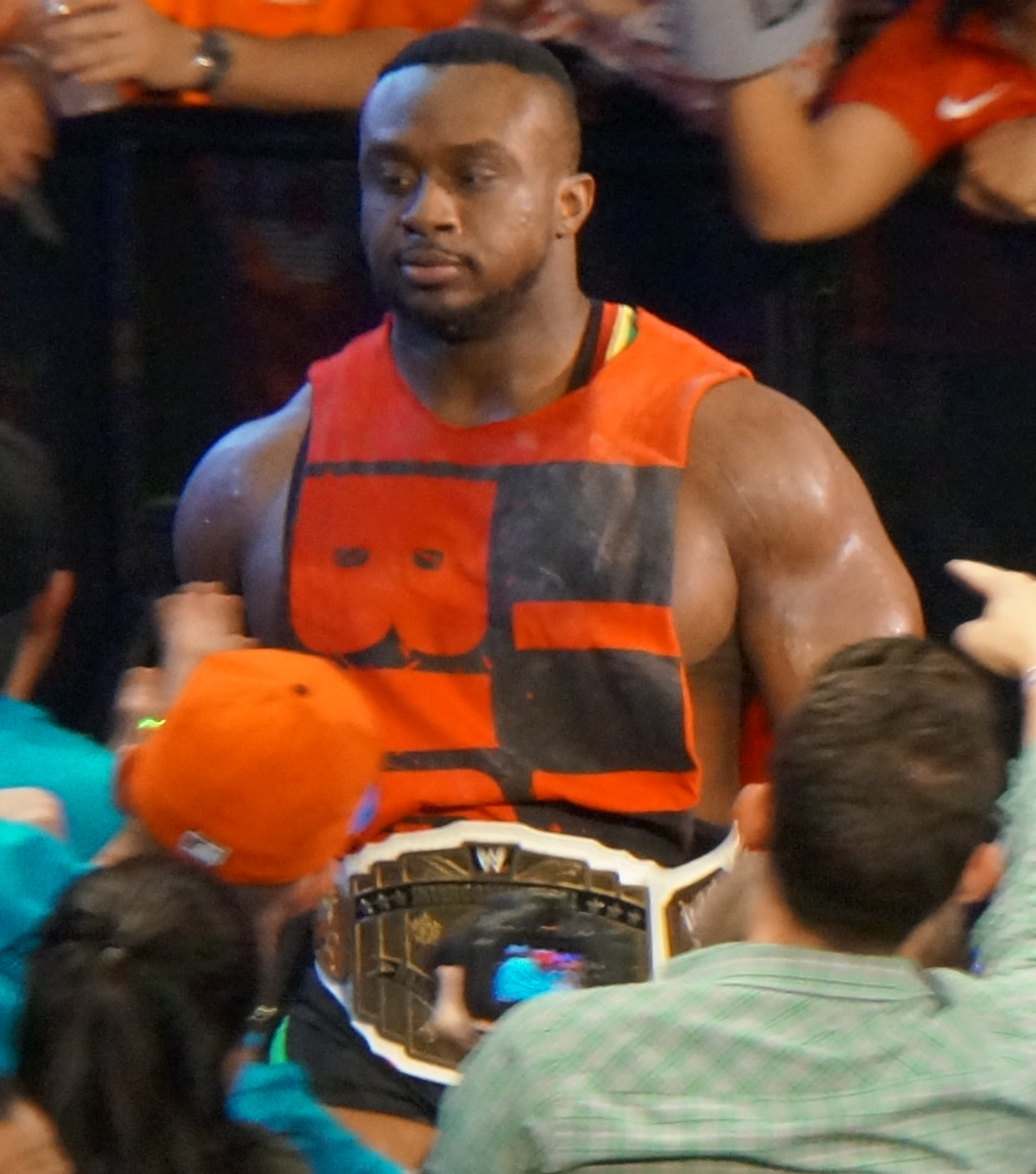
Big E is a two-time Intercontinental Champion...

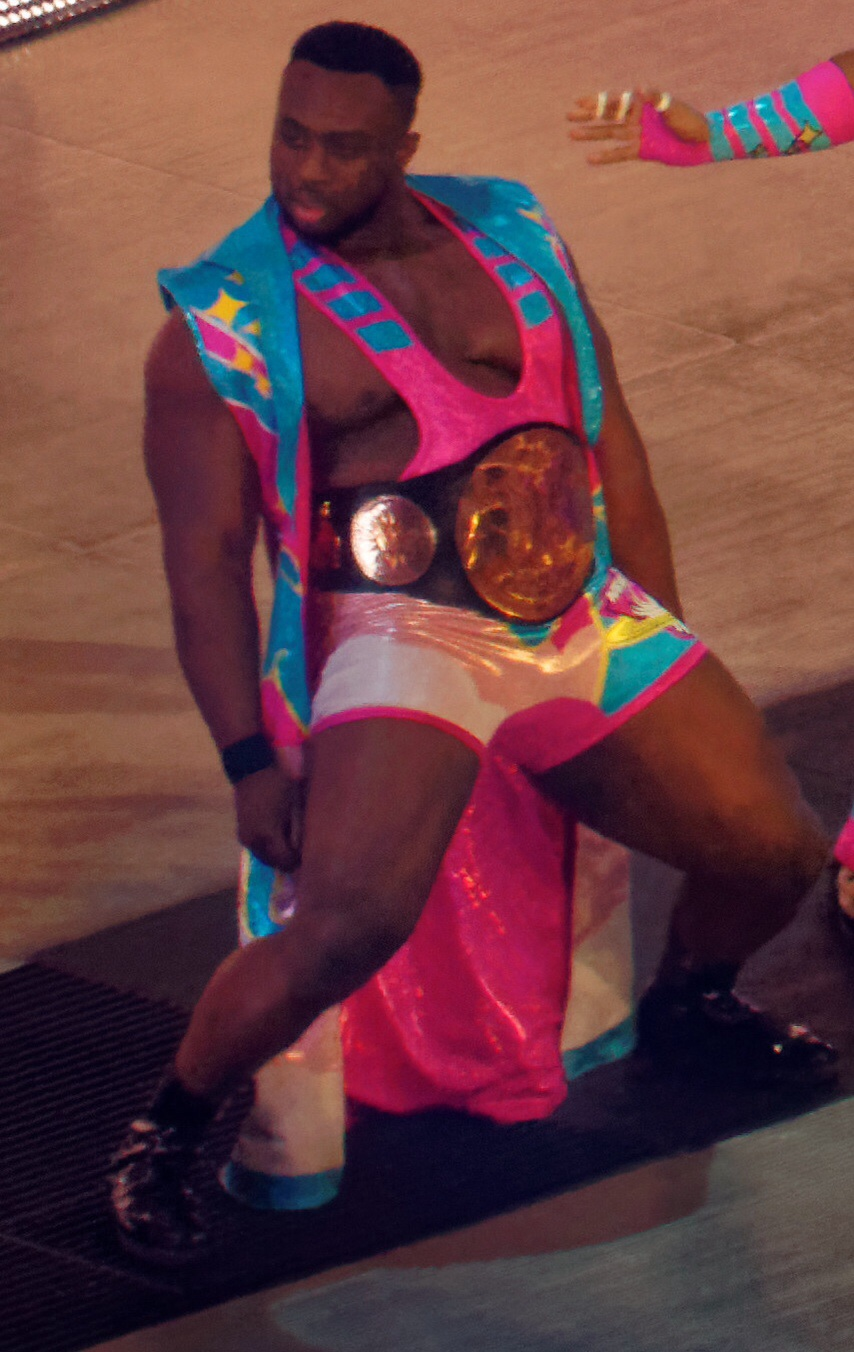
...and an overall eight-time Tag Team Champion in WWE.

- Florida Championship Wrestling
  - FCW Florida Tag Team Championship (1 time) – with Calvin Raines
- Pro Wrestling Illustrated
  - Tag Team of the Year (2015, 2016) with Kofi Kingston and Xavier Woods
  - Ranked No. 9 of the top 500 singles wrestlers in the PWI 500 in 2022
  - Ranked No. 8 of the top 50 tag teams in the PWI Tag Team 50 in 2020 with Kofi Kingston and Xavier Woods
- Sports Illustrated
  - Ranked No. 6 of the top 10 wrestlers in 2021
- Wrestling Observer Newsletter
  - Best Gimmick (2015) – The New Day
  - Shad Gaspard/Jon Huber Memorial Award (2020)
- WWE
  - WWE Championship (1 time)
  - NXT Championship (1 time)
  - WWE Intercontinental Championship (2 times)
  - WWE (Raw) Tag Team Championship (2 times) (Note: Big E, Kingston, and Woods defended the title under the Freebird Rule. On September 5, 2016, during the New Day's second reign, the titles were renamed the Raw Tag Team Championship after SmackDown established the SmackDown Tag Team Championship.) – with Kofi Kingston and Xavier Woods
  - WWE SmackDown Tag Team Championship (6 times) – with Kofi Kingston and Xavier Woods (Note: Big E defended the title with Kingston and Woods under the Freebird Rule during his first three reigns. He defended the title with Woods in the fourth reign and with Kingston in the fifth.)
  - WWE SmackDown Tag Team Championship Tournament (2018)
  - Men's Money in the Bank (2021)
  - 33rd Triple Crown Champion
  - WWE Year-End Award (1 time)
    - WWE Year-End Award for Men's Tag Team of the Year (2019) – with Kofi Kingston and Xavier Woods
  - Slammy Award (1 time)
    - Ring Gear of the Year (2020) – with Kofi Kingston and Xavier Woods
