= Brad Gillingham =

American strength athlete

- Born: Brad Gillingham; April 26, 1966 (age 60); St. Paul, Minnesota United States
- Occupations: Powerlifting, Strongman
- Height: 6 ft 5 in (1.96 m)
- Spouse: Diane Gillingham
- Children: Emily; Elizabeth
- Relatives: Gale Gillingham - father Karl Gillingham - brother Wade Gillingham - brother

Competition record

Powerlifting

Representing United States

World Games
Silver medal – second place	2001 Akita	+90kg
5th	2005 Duisburg	+90kg
4th	2009 Kaohsiung	+100kg

USAPL National Championships
4th	1992	125kg
3rd	1993	125kg
2nd	1994	145kg
5th	1995	145kg
2nd	1996	145kg
1st	1997	+125kg
1st	1998	+125kg
1st	1999	+125kg
1st	2000	+125kg
1st	2001	+125kg
2nd	2002	+125kg
2nd	2003	+125kg
2nd	2004	+125kg
1st	2006 Masters	+125kg
1st	2007	+125kg
1st	2008 Masters	+125kg
1st	2009	+125kg
1st	2010 Masters	+125kg
1st	2010	+125kg
1st	2011	+125kg
2nd	2012 RAW	+125kg
1st	2015 RAW Masters	+120kg
2nd	2017 RAW Masters 2	+120kg
1st	2018 RAW Masters 2	+120kg

IPF World Championships
2nd	1997	+125kg
4th	1998	+125kg
2nd	1999	+125kg
1st	2000	+125kg
1st	2001	+125kg
2nd	2002	+125kg
4th	2004	+125kg
1st	2006 Masters	+125kg
2nd	2007	+125kg
1st	2008 Masters	+125kg
1st	2009 Masters	+125kg
3rd	2010	+125kg
8th	2011	+120kg
1st	2013 Classic (RAW)	+120kg

IPF Pan-American Championships
1st	1996	+125kg
1st	2000	+125kg

IPF North American Championships
1st	2004	+125kg
1st	2006	+125kg
1st	2008	+125kg

IPF Arnold Classic GNC Pro Deadlift
1st	2008	+125kg
1st	2009	+125kg
1st	2010	+125kg
1st	2011	+125kg
1st	2012	+120kg
1st	2013	+120kg
2nd	2014	+120kg
2nd	2019	+120kg
4th	2020	+120kg

Strongman

Representing United States

Arnold Strongman Classic
7th	2002 Arnold Strongman Classic
8th	2003 Arnold Strongman Classic

Brad Gillingham (born April 26, 1966) is an American world champion powerlifter and strongman competitor from Minnesota, United States.

== Powerlifting ==
Brad is a 6 time IPF World Powerlifting Champion and a 14 time USAPL National Powerlifting Champion. Brad has won 34 Major Events. Brad has set IPF Open World Records in the 120+ kg Class with a 395 kg (870) deadlift at the 2011 IPF Pacific Invitational in Melbourne, Australia, and a 397.5 kg (876) deadlift at the 2011 IPF World Championships in Plzeň, Czech Republic. Brad set the IPF Open Classic (RAW) World Record deadlift at the 2013 IPF Classic World Championships in Suzdal, Russia with a 375 kg (826) deadlift. Brad has set 16 IPF Masters World Records with highlights being a 400 kg (881) deadlift at the 2010 IPF World Championships in Potchefstroom, South Africa and a 1057.5 kg (2331) Total at the 2008 IPF Masters World Championships in Palm Springs, California. Brad was inducted into the International Powerlifting Federation (IPF) Hall of Fame in November 2006, and into the IPF North American Powerlifting Federation (NAPF) Hall of Fame earlier that same year. Brad was a U.S.A. Powerlifting (USAPL) Brother Bennett (Hall of Fame) Award recipient in 2003. Brad was inducted into the Minnesota Chapter of the National Strength Coaches Association (NSCA) Hall of Fame in 2010.

== Personal life ==
Brad graduated from Little Falls, Minnesota Community High School in 1984 and St. Cloud State University in 1989. He lives in Minneota, Minnesota and is employed by the State of Minnesota. Brad is married to wife Diane and has two daughters Emily (21) and Elizabeth (18).

Brad is part of the First Family of Strength along with his late father Gale Gillingham, a former guard for the Green Bay Packers, and brothers Wade and Karl Gillingham.

Brad is the co-owner of Jackal's Gym in Marshall, Minnesota along with brothers Karl and Wade. Jackal's Gym also has a website with an online store that sells strongman and powerlifting training equipment.

Brad is a Certified Strength and Conditioning Specialist (CSCS) and coaches several elite powerlifters and athletes.

== Personal Records ==
Powerlifting Competition Records:

equipped

- Squat - 870 pounds (390 kg) (at the USAPL Nationals 2004)
- Bench press - 633 pounds (287 kg) (at the USAPL Nationals 2004)
- Deadlift - 881 pounds (400 kg) (at the AC IPF GNC Deadlift 2008 and IPF World Championship 2010)
- Total - 2,342 pounds (1,062 kg) (870/633/837) @330 pounds bodyweight (at the USAPL Nationals 2004)

raw (unequipped)

- Squat - 716 pounds (325 kg)
- Bench press - 518 pounds (235 kg)
- Deadlift - 843 pounds (382 kg)
- Total - 2,066 pounds (937 kg) (716/512/837) (at the USAPL Nationals 2012 RAW)

=== Record lifts in competition ===
- Squat - 859 pounds (390 kg) - USAPL Open American Record 145 kg
- Deadlift - 848 pounds (385 kg) - USAPL Open American Record 145 kg
- Total - 2,271 pounds (1,030 kg) - USAPL Open American Record 145 kg
- Deadlift - 843 pounds (382 kg) - USAPL RAW Open American Record +125 kg
- Total - 2,066 pounds (937 kg) - USAPL RAW Open American Record +125 kg
- Deadlift - 881 pounds (400 kg) - USAPL Masters American Record +125 kg
- Total - 2,331 pounds (1,057 kg) - USAPL Masters American Record +125 kg
- Squat - 716 pounds (325 kg) - USAPL RAW Masters American Record +125 kg
- Deadlift - 843 pounds (382 kg) - USAPL RAW Masters American Record +125 kg
- Total - 2,066 pounds (937 kg) - USAPL RAW Masters American Record +125 kg
- Deadlift - 865 pounds (392 kg) - USAPL Masters National Meet Record +125 kg
- Total - 2,237 pounds (1,015 kg) - USAPL Masters National Meet Record +125 kg
- Deadlift - 750 pounds (340 kg) - USAPL RAW Masters II American Record +125 kg
- Deadlift - 766 pounds (347 kg) - USAPL RAW Masters II American Record +125 kg
- Deadlift - 876 pounds (397 kg) - IPF World Open Record +120 kg
- Deadlift - 881 pounds (400 kg) - IPF World Masters Record +125 kg
- Deadlift - 876 pounds (397 kg) - IPF World Masters Record +120 kg
- Deadlift - 826 pounds (375 kg) - IPF World Classic Record +120 kg
- Total - 2,331 pounds (1,057 kg) - IPF World Masters Record +125 kg
- Total - 2,281 pounds (1,035 kg) - IPF World Masters Record +120 kg

Strongman Records:

- Hummer Tire Deadlift (15 inches from the floor) – 443 kg (977 lb) (former world record) (2003 Arnold's Strength Summit)
