= Brady Township, Michigan =

Brady Township is the name of some places in the U.S. state of Michigan:

- Brady Township, Kalamazoo County, Michigan
- Brady Township, Saginaw County, Michigan

== See also ==
- Brady Township (disambiguation)
