= Keyaa Banerji =

Indian powerlifter (born 2005)

Personal information
- Nationality: Indian
- Born: Keyaa Kunal Banerji; 16 February 2005 (age 21)

Sport
- Sport: Powerlifting
- Event: Junior Women's 47 kg
Medal record
Women's powerlifting
Representing India
IPF World Junior Championships
Silver medal – second place	2026 Sun City	Deadlift (47 kg)

Keyaa Kunal Banerji (born 16 February 2005) is an Indian powerlifter who competes internationally in the Junior Women's 47 kg weight category. She won a silver medal in the deadlift discipline at the 2026 International Powerlifting Federation (IPF) World Sub-Junior and Junior Classic Powerlifting Championships in Sun City, South Africa, deadlifting 140 kg—more than three times her body weight.

== Career ==
=== Domestic competitions (2025–2026) ===
Banerji made rapid progress in the domestic Indian powerlifting circuit across 2025 and 2026. At the 2025 National Sub-Junior & Junior Classic Powerlifting Championships, competing in the Junior 47 kg class, she logged an 82.5 kg squat, a 47.5 kg bench press, and a 127.5 kg deadlift, finishing with a total of 257.5 kg.

At the 2026 National Championship, Banerji substantially increased her performance marks, recording a 95 kg squat, a 52.5 kg bench press, and a 140 kg deadlift to finish with a combined total of 287.5 kg. That same year, she also earned a silver medal in the women's 47 kg division at the National Classic Bench Press Championship with a 47.5 kg press.

=== 2026 IPF World Junior Championships ===
In August 2026, Banerji represented India at the IPF World Sub-Junior and Junior Classic Powerlifting Championships in Sun City, South Africa, entered in the Junior Women's 47 kg division.

Weighing in at 45.70 kg, Banerji posted a 90 kg squat and a 50 kg bench press. In the deadlift, she completed an opening lift followed by a successful 140 kg second attempt, representing approximately 3.06 times her body weight. A subsequent third attempt at 142.5 kg was unsuccessful.

Banerji finished second in the deadlift event behind Inès Herbaux of France (165 kg) and ahead of Ireland's Bláthnaid O'Dwyer (who also registered 140 kg, but was placed behind Banerji on body weight/attempt order criteria), securing the individual deadlift silver medal. She placed fifth overall in the 47 kg classification with a 280 kg three-lift total.

== Media attention ==
Video footage of Banerji's 140 kg deadlift spread widely across social media platforms following the event, bringing unusual mainstream visibility in India to competitive powerlifting. In post-competition interviews, Banerji stated that while she had targeted the junior Asian record of 147.5 kg, she was proud of securing a world-championship podium finish. The viral attention also spurred broader discussions regarding the online reception and treatment of Indian female strength athletes.

== Competition record ==
Year	Competition	Venue	Weight class	Body weight	Squat	Bench press	Deadlift	Total	Overall rank	Event medals
2025	National Sub-Junior & Junior Classic Championships	India	47 kg	—	82.5 kg	47.5 kg	127.5 kg	257.5 kg	—	—
2026	National Classic Championships	India	47 kg	—	95.0 kg	52.5 kg	140.0 kg	287.5 kg	—	—
2026	IPF World Sub-Junior & Junior Classic Championships	Sun City, South Africa	47 kg	45.70 kg	90.0 kg	50.0 kg	140.0 kg	280.0 kg	5th	(silver) Deadlift
