= Brian Siders =

American powerlifter (born 1978)

Personal information
- Born: September 11, 1978 (age 47) West Virginia
- Occupation(s): Strongman, Powerlifter
- Height: 6 ft 2 in (1.88 m)
Medal record
Powerlifting
Representing United States
IPF World Games
Silver medal – second place	2005	+90kg
USAPL Junior National Powerlifting Championships
1st	2001	+125kg
USAPL National Powerlifting Championships
1st	2002	+125kg
1st	2003	+125kg
1st	2004	+125kg
1st	2005	+125kg
1st	2006	+125kg
IPF World Powerlifting Championships
6th	2002	+125kg
1st	2003	+125kg
1st	2004	+125kg
IPF World Games
Silver medal – second place	2005	+125kg
Mountaineer Cup
2nd	2002	+125kg
1st	2003	+125kg
1st	2004	+125kg
Strongman
Representing United States
World's Strongest Man
Qualified	2008 World's Strongest Man
Arnold Strongman Classic
5th	2005 Arnold Strongman Classic
7th	2006 Arnold Strongman Classic
7th	2007 Arnold Strongman Classic
5th	2008 Arnold Strongman Classic
6th	2009 Arnold Strongman Classic
10th	2010 Arnold Strongman Classic

Brian Cameron Siders (born September 11, 1978) is an American world champion powerlifter and regular participant in the Arnold Strongman Classic. Brian is regarded as one of the strongest men to ever walk the planet, especially in press-movements.

== Career ==
Brian started lifting in high school, mainly just training the bench press and upper body. Brian started focusing on squatting and deadlifting in the winter of 1997, and started doing full powerlifting meets in 1998. Brian trains 6–7 days per week and up to 4 hours at a time at his gym he built at his home. Brian has set several powerlifting world records, including a world record total of 2,452 lb at the 2004 USAPL Senior National Championships, and another world record total of 2,529 lb at the 2004 IPF World Championships. Brian held the IPF world record in the bench press of 775.5 lb (352.5 kg), and total (squat, bench press and deadlift) of 2,596 lb (1,180 kg) in the +125 kg (super heavyweight) weight class.

== Personal records ==
Powerlifting Competition Records: equipped

- Squat- 1,019 lb/462,5 kilo
- Bench Press - 799 lb/362,5 kilo
- Deadlift - 865 lb/392,5 kilo
- Total - 2,651 lb/1202,5 kilo
- The squat, bench and total are not official records because they were completed at a local powerlifting competition, and not at a national or international competition as one have to do to be counted as official records according to IPF rules.

raw (unequipped)

- Squat- 785 lb/356 kg.
- Bench Press - 650 lb/295 kg.
- Deadlift - 840 lb/381 kg.
- Total - 2,240 lb (785/635/820)

Strongman Records:

- Apollon's Wheels – 166 kg (366 lb) × 8 continental cleans and presses (joint-world record) (2009 Arnold Strongman Classic)
- Hummer Tire Deadlift (15 inches from the floor) – 448 kg (988 lb) (former world record) (2006 Arnold Strongman Classic)
