= USAPL =

USAPL may refer to:

- USA Pool League
- USA Powerlifting
