= Brady Stewart =

American weightlifter (born 1982)

- Born: July 21, 1982 (age 42); St. Louis, Missouri, United States
- Occupation(s): Athlete, Bench Presser, Coach
- Height: 5 ft 11 in (1.80 m)
- Spouse: Beth Stewart
- Children: 2
- Website: http://bradystewart.com

Notes
- Devoted Christian, attends Church at FBC Carterville

Competition record

Powerlifting

Representing United States

IPF OPEN Bench Press World Championships
| Bronze medal – third place | 2019 (Japan) | 120kg |
| 4th | 2018 (South Africa) | 120kg |
| Bronze medal – third place | 2017 (Lithuania) | 120kg |
| Silver medal – second place | 2016 (Denmark) | 120kg |
| 4th | 2015 (Sweden) | 120kg |
| 6th | 2009 (Luxembourg) | 120kg |

IPF OPEN Bench Press World Championships Team Placings
| 5th | 2019 (Japan) | TEAM (United States) |
| 6th | 2018 (South Africa) | TEAM (United States) |
| 5th | 2017 (Lithuania) | TEAM (United States) |
| Bronze medal – third place | 2016 (Denmark) | TEAM (United States) |
| Bronze medal – third place | 2015 (Sweden) | TEAM (United States) |
| 8th | 2013 (Lithuania) | TEAM (United States) |
| Gold medal – first place | 2009 (Luxembourg) | TEAM (United States) |

NAPF OPEN Bench Press Championships
| Gold medal – first place | 2017 (Canada) | 120kg |
| Gold medal – first place | 2012 (United States) | 120kg |
| Gold medal – first place | 2011 (United States) | 120kg |

USAPL National OPEN BP Championships
| Gold medal – first place | 2019 | 120kg |
| Gold medal – first place | 2018 | 120kg |
| Gold medal – first place | 2017 | 120kg |
| Gold medal – first place | 2016 | 120kg |
| Gold medal – first place | 2015 | 120kg |
| Silver medal – second place | 2014 | 120kg |
| Gold medal – first place | 2013 | 120kg |
| Bronze medal – third place | 2012 | 120kg |
| Silver medal – second place | 2010 | 110kg |
| Bronze medal – third place | 2009 | 110kg |
| Bronze medal – third place | 2008 | 110kg |
| Gold medal – first place | 2005 JUNIOR | 110kg |
| Gold medal – first place | 2004 JUNIOR | 110kg |

Arnold Classic Titan Pro Bench
| Bronze medal – third place | 2020 | OVERALL 1st at 120kg |
| Gold medal – first place | 2019 | SHW & OVERALL CHAMPION |
| Gold medal – first place | 2017 | 120kg |
| Gold medal – first place | 2015 | 120kg |
| Bronze medal – third place | 2012 | 120kg |
| Silver medal – second place | 2011 | 120kg |
| Gold medal – first place | 2010 | 125kg |

Arnold Classic Raw PL Championships
| Gold medal – first place | 2008 | 110kg |

Brady Anthony Stewart is an American weightlifter. He was born on July 21, 1982, in St. Louis Missouri. Stewart is an 8-time US National Bench Press Team member for USA Powerlifting (Luxembourg 2009, Lithuania 2013, Sweden 2015, Denmark 2016, Lithuania 2017, South Africa 2018, Japan 2019, Czech Republic 2020[canceled due to Covid-19]). Stewart is the current American Record holder in the 120 kg / 264 lbs weight class with a press of 356.5 kg or 785.9 lbs. Stewart is the only lifter in US history to have medaled in IPF OPEN World Equipped Bench Press Championship competition in the 264 lbs weight class. He is also a member of the historic 2009 World Champion US National Bench Press Team.

== Career ==
Stewart has competed in powerlifting and bench pressing since 2000. He has won eight US National Bench Press Championship Gold Medals. He is the most decorated and dominant 120 kg / 264 lbs bench presser in the history of this sport in the United States. He has earned 3 bronze medals, 1 silver medal, and 8 gold medals in national championship competition. Brady is the only US athlete in his weight class to have medaled in OPEN World Championship Competition with a team Gold (TEAM USA) (Hamm, Luxembourg 2009), individual Silver placing (Rødby, Denmark 2016), and two individual Bronze placings (Kaunas, Lithuania 2017 and Tokyo, Japan 2019). Stewart won the 2019 Arnold Sports Festival Pro Bench Championships with an historic lift of 372.5 kg / 821.2 lbs at a bodyweight of 124.89 kg / 275 lbs making it the All-Time Drug Tested Bench Press Record at 125 kg / 275 lbs weight class across federations (2 hour weigh in). This lift narrowly edged out Blaine Sumner's historic 455 kg / 1003 lbs bench press by less than 1/2 of an IPF formula point. Stewart is also a 3 time gold medalist in the North American Powerlifting Federation. Earlier in Stewart's career, he was the American Record holder in the squat, bench press, and total in the 242 lbs weight class in the inaugural Arnold Classic Raw Powerlifting Championships.

== McKendree University Sports Hall of Fame ==
Stewart, 2004 graduate of McKendree University, was inducted into the Sports Hall of Fame on October 27, 2018, for his outstanding lifting career and dedication to coaching a new generation of strength athletes.

== Coaching ==
Stewart owns, operates, and coaches athletes at Zion Barbell in Carterville, Illinois. In 2017 and 2018, his team won the Illinois State Powerlifting Championships. Stewart has produced seven (drug free and drug tested) 600 lbs plus bench pressers and several others to over 500 lbs in USA Powerlifting utilizing his own methods. Brady is also the first coach of the Southern Illinois University at Carbondale Powerlifting Team. He has popularized concepts of training tolerance and readiness on his iTunes Podcast, Berserker Strength Radio, with co-host Joshua Hunt.

== All-Time World Bench Press Record ==
Stewart's press of 372.5 kg / 821.2 lbs at a bodyweight of 124.89 kg / 275 lbs at the 2019 Arnold Sports Festival Pro Bench Championships is the "All-Time" World Bench Press Record Drug Tested with a 2 Hour weigh in.

| Lift(kg/lbs) | Wilks Score | Bodyweight | Date | Competition | Location |
|---|---|---|---|---|---|
| 372.5 kg/821.2.9 lbs | 212.30 | 124.89.kg(125 kg) | 3/3/2019 | Arnold Sports Festival Titan Pro Bench Press Championships | Columbus, OH |

== American record history ==
| Lift(kg/lbs) | Wilks Score | Bodyweight | Date | Competition | Location |
|---|---|---|---|---|---|
| 356.5 kg/785.9 lbs | 205.02 | 119.86 kg(120 kg) | 10/28/2017 | NAPF(IPF) BP Championships | Hamilton, Canada |
| 343 kg/756.2 lbs | 197.43 | 119.4 kg(120 kg) | 9/9/2017 | 2017 USAPL BP Nationals | Killeen, TX |
| 342.5 kg/755.1 lbs | 197.07 | 119.6 kg(120 kg) | 5/6/2017 | USAPL IL State Championships | Lebanon, IL |
| 340.5 kg/750.7 lbs | 196.16 | 119.1 kg(120 kg) | 8/29/2015 | 2015 USAPL BP Nationals | Scranton, PA |
| 333 kg/734.1 lbs | 191.79 | 119.1 kg(120 kg) | 8/29/2015 | 2015 USAPL BP Nationals | Scranton, PA |
| 332.5 kg/733 lbs | 191.85 | 118.24 kg(120 kg) | 5/23/2015 | 2015 IPF BP World Championships | Sundsvall, Sweden |
| 320 kg/705.5 lbs | 184.01 | 119.9 kg(120 kg) | 3/8/2015 | 2015 Arnold Class Pro BP | Columbus, OH |

"FROZEN" 110 kg / 242 lbs USA American Bench Press Record History

280 kg (617.2 lbs) - 5/21/2011 - Illinois State Powerlifting Championships (Harrisburg, Illinois)

262.5 kg (578.7 lbs) - 3/1/2008 - Championships (Columbus, OH)

== IPF World Bench Press Championship placings ==
| Year | Placing | Bench Press | Location |
|---|---|---|---|
| 2019 | BRONZE | 350 kg / 771 lbs | Tokyo, Japan |
| 2018 | 4th | 340 kg / 749.5 lbs | Potchefstroom, South Africa |
| 2017 | BRONZE | 340 kg / 749.5 lbs | Kaunas, Lithuania |
| 2016 | SILVER | 335 kg / 738.5 lbs | Rødby, Denmark |
| 2015 | 4th | 332.5 kg / 733 lbs | Sundsvall, Sweden |
| 2013 | BOMB | NO LIFT DQ | Kaunas, Lithuania |
| 2009 | 6th | 277.5 kg / 611.7 lbs | Hamm, Luxembourg |

IPF World Championship Results

== Competition history ==
=== Bench Press Only Raw and Equipped ===
Representing the United States
| Year | Competition | Venue | Position | Notes | |
|---|---|---|---|---|---|
| 2002 | Illinois Prairie State Games | SWIC Belleville, Illinois | 1st | 161.03 kg / 355 lbs | 100 kg/220 lbs RAW |
| 2002 | SLP RAW NATIONALS | Rolla, Missouri | 1st | 170.1 kg / 375 lbs | 100 kg/220 lbs RAW |
| 2003 | USAPL Michigan State | Bangor, Michigan | 1st | 171.1 kg / 375 lbs | 100 kg/220 lbs |
| 2003 | USAPL Collegiate Nationals | St. Louis, Missouri | 3rd | 160 kg / 352.7 lbs | 100 kg/220 lbs |
| 2003 | Illinois Prairie State Games | SWIC Belleville, Illinois | 1st | 171.1 kg / 375 lbs | 100 kg/220 lbs RAW |
| 2003 | USAPL Ozark Open | St. Louis, Missouri | 2nd | 170 kg / 374.7 lbs | 90 kg/198 lbs |
| 2003 | USAPL IL Bench Press Championships | Chicago, Illinois | 1st JR | 165 kg / 363.7 lbs | 90 kg/198 lbs |
| 2004 | USAPL St Louis Fitness Festival | St. Louis, Missouri | 3rd | 170 kg / 374.7 lbs | 90 kg/198 lbs |
| 2004 | Wally World Bench Press | St. Louis, Missouri | 1st | 165.5 kg / 365 lbs | 100 kg/220 lbs RAW |
| 2004 | USAPL Ozark Championships | St. Louis, Missouri | 1st | 202.5 kg / 446.4 lbs | 100 kg/220 lbs |
| 2004 | USAPL Bench Press Nationals | Killeen, Texas | 1st JR | 197.5 kg / 435.4 lbs | 100 kg/220 lbs |
| 2004 | USAPL River's Edge Championships | Granite City, Illinois | 1st | 207.5 kg / 457.5 lbs | 100 kg/220 lbs |
| 2005 | USAPL Ozark Championships | St. Louis, Missouri | 1st | 215 kg / 474 lbs | 110 kg/242 lbs |
| 2005 | USAPL Illinois State Championships | Harrisburg, Illinois | 1st | 222.5 kg / 490.5 lbs | 110 kg/242 lbs |
| 2005 | USAPL Bench Press Nationals | St. Louis, Missouri | 1st | 220 kg / 485 lbs | 110 kg/242 lbs |
| 2006 | USAPL Illinois State Championships | Granite City, Illinois | 1st | 183.7 kg / 405 lbs | 110 kg/242 lbs RAW |
| 2006 | USAPL River's Edge Championships | Granite City, Illinois | 1st | 190 kg / 418.9 lbs | 110 kg/242 lbs RAW |
| 2006 | USAPL Kentucky State | Kentucky | 1st | 235 kg / 518 lbs | 110 kg/242 lbs |
| 2007 | USAPL Ozark Championships | St. Louis, Missouri | 1st | 235 kg / 518 lbs | 110 kg/242 lbs |
| 2007 | USAPL Men's Nationals (BP) | St. Louis, Missouri | 1st | 250 kg / 551 lbs | 110 kg/242 lbs |
| 2008 | Arnold Classic Raw Championships | Columbus, OH | 1st | 205 kg / 451.9 lbs | 110 kg/242 lbs RAW |
| 2008 | USAPL Ozark Championships | St. Louis, Missouri | 1st | 262.5 kg / 578.7 lbs | 110 kg/242 lbs |
| 2008 | USAPL Ozark Championships | St. Louis, Missouri | 1st | 262.5 kg / 578.7 lbs | 110 kg/242 lbs |
| 2008 | USAPL Bench Press Nationals | Charlotte, NC | 3rd | 277.5 kg / 611 lbs | 110 kg/242 lbs |
| 2009 | IPF Bench Press World Championships | Hamm, Luxembourg | 6th | 277.5 kg / 611 lbs | 110 kg/242 lbs |
| 2009 | USAPL Bench Press Nationals | Cleveland, OH | 3rd | 265 kg / 584 lbs | 110 kg/242 lbs |
| 2009 | USAPL Kentucky State Championships | Kentucky | 1st | 263 kg / 580 lbs | 110 kg/242 lbs |
| 2010 | IPF Titan Pro Bench Bash | Columbus, OH | 3rd | 282.5 kg / 622.8 lbs | 125 kg/275 lbs |
| 2010 | USAPL Illinois State Championships | Harrisburg, Illinois | 1st | 205.5 kg / 453 lbs | 110 kg/242 lbs RAW |
| 2010 | USAPL Bench Press Nationals | Charlottesville, VA | 2nd | 287.5 kg / 633.8 lbs | 110 kg/242 lbs |
| 2010 | USAPL Belleville Benchfest | Belleville, Illinois | 1st | 295 kg / 650 lbs | 125 kg/275 lbs |
| 2011 | IPF Titan Pro Bench Bash | Columbus, OH | 6th | 290 kg / 639.3 lbs | 125 kg/275 lbs |
| 2011 | USAPL Ozark Championships | St. Louis, Missouri | 1st | 305 kg / 672.4 lbs | 125 kg/275 lbs |
| 2011 | USAPL Illinois State Championships | Harrisburg, Illinois | 1st | 280 kg / 617.3 lbs | 110 kg/242 lbs |
| 2011 | USAPL Bench Press Nationals | Orlando, FL | BOMB | *** | 120 kg/264 lbs |
| 2011 | North American Bench Press Championships | Miami, FL | 1st | 300 kg / 661.4 lbs | 120 kg/264 lbs |
| 2012 | IPF Titan Pro Bench Bash | Columbus, OH | 2nd | 310 kg / 683 lbs | 120 kg/264 lbs |
| 2012 | USAPL Illinois State Championships | Harrisburg, Illinois | 1st | 310 kg / 683 lbs | 120 kg/264 lbs |
| 2012 | USAPL Bench Press Nationals | Palm Springs, CA | 3rd | 305 kg / 672.4 lbs | 120 kg/264 lbs |
| 2012 | North American Bench Press Championships | Aurora, CO | 1st | 310 kg / 683 lbs | 120 kg/264 lbs |
| 2013 | USAPL Ozark Championships | St. Louis, Missouri | 1st | 322.5 kg / 711 lbs | 120 kg/264 lbs |
| 2013 | IPF Bench Press World Championships | Kaunas, Lithuania | BOMB | *** | 120 kg/264 lbs |
| 2013 | USAPL Bench Press Nationals | Atlanta, GA | 1st | 307.5 kg / 677.9 lbs | 120 kg/264 lbs |
| 2014 | USAPL Bench Press Nationals | San Antonio, TX | 2nd | 310 kg / 683.4 lbs | 120 kg/264 lbs |
| 2015 | IPF Titan Pro Bench Bash | Columbus, OH | 1st | 320 kg / 705.5 lbs | 120 kg/264 lbs |
| 2015 | USAPL Illinois State Championships | Belleville, Illinois | 1st | 330 kg / 727.5 lbs | 120 kg/264 lbs |
| 2015 | IPF Bench Press World Championships | Sundsvall, Sweden | 4th | 332.5 kg / 733 lbs | 120 kg/264 lbs |
| 2015 | USAPL Bench Press Nationals | Scranton, PA | 1st | 340.5 kg / 750.7 lbs | 120 kg/264 lbs |
| 2016 | IPF Titan Pro Bench Bash | Columbus, OH | BOMB | *** | 120 kg/264 lbs |
| 2016 | IPF Bench Press World Championships | Rødby, Denmark | 2nd | 335 kg / 738.5 lbs | 120 kg/264 lbs |
| 2016 | USAPL Bench Press Nationals | Aurora, CO | 1st | 327.5 kg / 722 lbs | 120 kg/264 lbs |
| 2017 | IPF Titan Pro Bench Bash | Columbus, OH | 1st | 337.5 kg / 744 lbs | 120 kg/264 lbs |
| 2017 | USAPL Illinois State Championships | Lebanon, Illinois | 1st | 342.5 kg / 755.1 lbs | 120 kg/264 lbs |
| 2016 | IPF Bench Press World Championships | Kaunas, Lithuania | 3rd | 340 kg / 749.6 lbs | 120 kg/264 lbs |
| 2017 | USAPL Bench Press Nationals | Killeen, TX | 1st | 343 kg / 756.2 lbs | 120 kg/264 lbs |
| 2017 | North American Bench Press Championships | Hamilton, Canada | 1st | 356.5 kg / 785.9 lbs | 120 kg/264 lbs |
| 2018 | IPF Titan Pro Bench Bash | Columbus, OH | BOMB | *** | 120 kg/264 lbs |
| 2018 | IPF Bench Press World Championships | Potchefstroom, South Africa | 4th | 340 kg / 749.6 lbs | 120 kg/264 lbs |
| 2018 | USAPL Bench Press Nationals | Scranton, PA | 1st | 335 kg / 738.5 lbs | 120 kg/264 lbs |
| 2018 | USAPL Beast of the Metro East | Lebanon, IL | BOMB | *** | 120 kg/264 lbs |
| 2019 | Arnold Titan Pro Bench Bash | Columbus, OH | 1st | 372.5 kg / 821 lbs | SHW / 275 lbs |
| 2019 | IPF Bench Press World Championships | Tokyo, Japan | 3rd | 350 kg / 771 lbs | 120 kg / 264 lbs |
| 2019 | USAPL Bench Press Nationals | Sioux Falls, SD | 1st | 350 kg / 771 lbs | 120 kg/264 lbs |
| 2020 | Arnold Titan Pro Bench Bash | Columbus, OH | 3rd | 350 kg / 771 lbs | 120 kg/264 lbs |

== Drug testing ==
Stewart is a drug-tested athlete in the Athlete Location (ALF) Pool utilizing drug test protocols of the USADA and WADA. Stewart has never failed a drug test nor has ever been suspended as an athlete for any misconduct.
