= Austin Perkins =

American powerlifter

Personal information
- Born: April 25, 1999 (age 27)
- Education: Midland University
- Height: 162.5 cm (5 ft 4.0 in)
- Weight: 73.3 kg (162 lb)
- Children: 1

Sport
- Country: United States (2016–present)
- Sport: Powerlifting
- Event: 74 kg
- Coached by: Joe Stanek

Achievements and titles
- Personal bests: Squat: 341 kg (2026); Bench Press: 208 kg (2026); Deadlift: 344 kg (2026); Total: 891.5 kg (2026)
Medal record
Men's powerlifting
Representing United States
IPF World Classic Powerlifting Championships
Gold medal – first place	2024 Druskininkai	– 74 kg
Gold medal – first place	2025 Chemnitz	– 74 kg
Gold medal – first place	2026 Druskininkai	– 74 kg
SBD Sheffield Powerlifting Championships
5th	2025 Sheffield	Absolute
Gold medal – first place	2026 Sheffield	Absolute
IPF University Powerlifting Cup
Gold medal – first place	2019 Tartu	– 74 kg
IPF World Sub-Juniors Equipped Powerlifting Championships
Silver medal – second place	2017 Orlando	– 74 kg
Powerlifing America Classic Open Nationals
Gold medal – first place	2024 Reno	– 74 kg
Powerlifting America Avancus Houston
Gold medal – first place	2025 Avancus	Absolute
USA Powerlifting Raw Nationals
Silver medal – second place	2019 Lombard	– 74 kg
Silver medal – second place	2021 Daytona Beach	– 74 kg
Gold medal – first place	2023 Memphis	– 74 kg
USA Powerlifting Equipped Nationals
Silver medal – second place	2021 Daytona Beach	– 74 kg

Austin Perkins (born April 25, 1999) is an American powerlifter who competes in the classic 74 kg class for the International Powerlifting Federation (IPF). He is a three-time IPF World Classic Open champion, winning since 2024, and holds the IPF world records in the squat, deadlift, and total in his weight class. His total of 891.5 kg (1,965.4 lb), set at the 2026 Sheffield Powerlifting Championships, exceeds the world record total of the 83 kg class. As of June 2026, Perkins holds the highest IPF GL score of any lifter in the OpenIPF rankings, a formula used to compare performances across bodyweights; on this basis he has been described in strength-sports media as among the greatest pound-for-pound powerlifters competing.

== Early life and career ==
Perkins is from Clinton, Mississippi, where he attended Clinton High School. As a high school senior, he competed at the 2017 USA Powerlifting High School National Championship, held on April 1, 2017, in Scranton, Pennsylvania, with a 551 lb (250 kg) squat, a 325 lb (147 kg) bench press, and a 584 lb (265 kg) deadlift, winning the competition in the 75 kg weight class. He was the lightest competitor in his class at the time.

Perkins went on to compete for the powerlifting program at Midland University in Fremont, Nebraska, under coach Tim Anderson. At the 2019 University World Cup in Tartu, Estonia, he won the tournament's overall Best Lifter award and set junior world records in the squat (275 kg) and deadlift (307.5 kg) in the 75 kg class, as Midland's men's team won the team title.

In 2024, Perkins won the IPF World Classic Open Championships in the 74 kg class and was awarded overall Best Lifter award with winning total from 836 kg, a feat he would maintain at the 2025 and 2026 world championships. In January 2026, Perkins won the invitational SBD Sheffield Championships, setting IPF world records in the squat with 341 kg and a total of 891.5 kg, which would surpass the total world record in the 83 kg class.

=== World Championship results ===
IPF World Classic Open Championships — 74 kg
Year	Location	Bodyweight (kg)	Squat (kg)	Bench (kg)	Deadlift (kg)	Total (kg)	IPF GL	Place
2024	Druskininkai, Lithuania	72.75	311.0	200.0	325.0	836.0	123.83	(gold) 1st
2025	Chemnitz, Germany	73.81	323.5	205.0	335.0	842.5	123.85	(gold) 1st
2026	Druskininkai, Lithuania	73.30	340.0	207.5	344.0	891.5	131.53	(gold) 1st

== Records ==
Perkins holds the current IPF classic 74 kg world records in the squat (341 kg, set at the 2026 SBD Sheffield Championships) and the deadlift (344 kg, set at the 2026 World Championships), as well as the total. His 891.5 kg total at the 2026 SBD Sheffield Championships and the 2026 IPF World Classic Championships exceeded the standing world-record total in the 83 kg class.

== Personal life ==
Perkins is married to female powerlifter Sindy Aguielera. Perkins and Aguilera met at Midland University in June 2021. The couple became engaged in July 2023 and privately eloped in July 2024. They welcomed their first child, a daughter named Amara Aguilera Perkins, in July 2025.
