= Brady Toops (album) =

Studio album by Brady Toops
- Released: August 27, 2013
- Genres: CCM, worship, folk
- Length: 46:10
- Label: Underspoken

Brady Toops is the first studio album by Brady Toops. Underspoken Records released the album on August 27, 2013.

== Critical reception ==
Professional ratings
Review scores
Source	Rating
Cross Rhythms	9/10 squares
Indie Vision Music	4/5 stars
New Release Today	4/5 stars

Awarding the album four stars from New Release Today, Kevin Davis states, "This is a very emotional album and if you're not familiar with Brady’s passionate vocal style, this album is hook-filled with catchy melodies wrapped around very introspective, worshipful and emotional lyrics." James Yelland, rating the album a nine out of ten for Cross Rhythms, writes, "With a vintage yet contemporary sound, this album feels awash with the sound of his Nashville base ... A fine album." Giving the album four stars at Indie Vision Music, Sara Walz describes, "Brady Toops is a collection of songs that will calm the heart and pierce the soul."

== Track listing ==
No.	Title	Length
1.	"By the River"	3:17
2.	"Golden Bell"	4:23
3.	"Reckless Love"	5:11
4.	"Lord Have Mercy"	4:53
5.	"Glorious Name"	4:33
6.	"Come on Home"	3:29
7.	"Swing Low Sweet Chariot"	4:23
8.	"Soon and Very Soon"	3:18
9.	"Blessed Savior"	3:01
10.	"Make Your Home"	4:26
11.	"O for Grace"	5:16
Total length:		46:10
