= Brady Toops =

American musician (born 1981)

- Born: Brady Allen Toops; July 31, 1981 (age 44); Minneapolis, Minnesota, United States
- Origin: New London
- Genres: folk, soul, gospel
- Occupations: Singer, songwriter, entrepreneur
- Instruments: Vocals, guitar, piano
- Years active: 2007–present
- Website: bradytoops.com

Brady Allen Toops (born July 31, 1981) is an American musician, songwriter and a former baseball player. His debut album, Brady Toops, was released in 2013. His second album, Tried & True, was released in 2017. He appeared on the eleventh season of ABC’s The Bachelorette.

== Early life ==
Toops was born in Minneapolis, Minnesota, on 31 July 1981, to educators George Toops Jr. and Kim Toops. He grew up in New London. He attended the New London-Spicer High School, and graduated in 2000. In 2000, Toops was among the twenty-five senior High School students who were awarded the Scholar Athlete Milk Mustache of the Year (SAMMY) award. He received a $7,500 college scholarship and was featured in USA Today.

He studied Marketing at the University of Arkansas and graduated in 2007.

== Career ==
=== Baseball ===
Toops was recruited by Harvard, Minnesota, and Arkansas. He chose to play for the University of Arkansas. He played four years as a catcher with the Razorbacks, and had been named a captain of the team in 2003, until he was selected in the Major League Baseball draft of 2004 in the 10th round by the St. Louis Cardinals. His stint in the minor leagues would only last three years, when he stopped playing after the 2006 season.

=== Music ===
Toops' music career began in 2008. His first studio album, Brady Toops, was released on August 27, 2013. His sophomore album, Tried & True, was released on March 11, 2017.

=== Podcast ===
He hosts Soul Games podcast. He also curates Soul Games a 12-week personal development program.

== Personal life ==
In 2015, he competed in Season 11 of The Bachelorette, with Britt Nilsson and Kaitlyn Bristowe Toops lives in Nashville, Tennessee.

== Discography ==
Studio albums

- Tried & True (2017)
- Brady Toops (2013)
