= Brady v Brady =

- Court: House of Lords
- Decided: 19 May 1988
- Citations: [1989] AC 755 [1988] 2 WLR 1308 [1988] BCLC 20 (1988) 3 BCC 535 [1988] 2 All ER 617

Court membership
- Judges sitting: Lord Keith of Kinkel; Lord Havers; Lord Templeman; Lord Griffiths; Lord Oliver of Aylmerton

Case opinions
- Lord Oliver of Aylmerton

Keywords
- Shares, financial assistance

Brady v Brady [1989] AC 755 is a UK company law case decided by the House of Lords relating to the prohibition on financial assistance.

== Facts ==
T. Brady & Sons Ltd and its subsidiaries went through restructuring after the two brothers that owned the majority of shares fell out and wished to divide the company's assets. One part of the process involved paying financial assistance to reduce liability on the company buying some of the shares. The fact that it was financial assistance was accepted, but it was argued that this was not the main purpose, relying on the exception in section 153(2) of the Companies Act 1985 (now the Companies Act 2006 section 678(4) exception).

That section provided that: "Section 151(2) [of the Companies Act 1985] does not prohibit a company from giving financial assistance if (a) the company’s principal purpose in giving the assistance is not to reduce or discharge any liability incurred by a person for the purpose of the acquisition of shares in the company or its holding company, or the reduction or discharge of any such liability is but an incidental part of some larger purpose of the company, and (b) the assistance is given in good faith in the interests of the company."

== Judgment ==
Lord Oliver held the requirement is the assistance is given in good faith and in the best interests of the company, a subjective standard. He rejected that a 'larger' purpose of freeing deadlock would suffice for almost anything, and so on this ground the exemption was not fulfilled.

The acquisition was not a mere incident of the scheme devised to break the deadlock. It was the essence of the scheme itself and the object which the scheme set out to achieve.

== See also ==
- UK company law
