= Brady Wilks =

American photographer (born 1980)

- Born: June 3, 1980 (age 46); California
- Movement: Photography
- Years active: 1990s–present
- Website: www.bradywilks.com

Brady Wilks (born June 3, 1980) is an American photographer, known for his alternative process landscapes. He works in historical and alternative photographic processes including acrylic gel lift / transfers and wet plate collodion process negatives, ambrotypes, and ferrotype.

== Education ==
Wilks attended Art Institute of Pittsburgh earning a bachelor's, and the Academy of Art University in San Francisco earning a Master's of Fine Arts in Photography.

== Career ==
His work has been shown in galleries in the United States with a current focus on the mid-atlantic coast including Maryland, Washington D.C. and Virginia. He was juried into the Torpedo Factory Art Center of Alexandria Virginia as an associate artist.

Wilks moved from southern California to the Mid Atlantic coast living outside of Washington D.C. in Maryland. He currently works as an artist and educator focusing on alternative and historical photographic processes.

Wilks started teaching alternative process workshops at art centers including Pyramid Atlantic Art Center in Silver Spring, Maryland, and Black Rock Center for the Arts in Germantown, Maryland. He has devised methods of alternative processes and turned them into a series of how-to articles first published with alternativephotography.com. Although he uses and teaches many alternative processes, his focus is on Acrylic Gel Lifts and the Wet Plate Collodion Process.

Wilks was a sponsored speaker at the Society for Photographic Education national conference in New Orleans 2015. He addressed the topic of concept and process with emphasis on getting over the novelty of alternative processes.

== Bibliography ==
- Alternative Photographic Processes: Crafting Handmade Images (2015)

== Recent select exhibits, awards and publications ==
- 2011 – Artomatic of Frederick - Frederick MD
- 2011 - Artists' Gallery Small Works Show - Frederick MD
- 2011 - Delaplaine Visual Arts Education Center - Frederick MD
- 2011 - Photographer's Forum - Finalist Best of Photography 2011
- 2011 - Photographer's Forum - Published in the Best of Photography 2011 year end book
- 2011 - FCCTV Broadcast - The Visual Arts with David Moreland
- 2012 - Torpedo Factory Target Gallery New Artists Show - Alexandria VA
- 2012 - BlackRock Center for the Arts Terrace Gallery - Germantown MD
- 2012 - Artists' Gallery Solo Exhibit, Small Windows - Frederick MD
- 2012 - The Deplane Visual Arts Center - Solo Exhibit - Frederick MD
- 2013 - Kiernan Gallery - Methods - Juried Exhibit by Christopher James - Lexington VA
- 2013 - Artique Underground - Volt Restaurant - Frederick MD
- 2014 - YourDailyPhotograph.com - Selected as Emerging / Contemporary Artist
- 2014 - Kieran Gallery - Fact or Fiction - Juried by Melanie Craven - Lexington VA
- 2014 - Gormley Gallery - Solo Exhibit - Soul of the Land - Baltimore MD
- 2015 - Potter Gallery - The Hand Magazine Juried Show - Missouri Western State University, St. Joe MO
- 2015 - UPA Gallery - Guest Artist - St. Petersburgh FL
- 2015 - Book: Alternative Photographic Processes: Crafting Handmade Images by Brady Wilks published by Focal Press
