= Brady (nickname) =

Brady is a nickname, usually a short form of Brayden (or spelling variations thereof). It may refer to:

- Brady Boone (1958–1998), American professional wrestler
- Brady Cowell (1899–1989), American college football, basketball and baseball head coach and athletic director
- Brady Murray (born 1984), Canadian ice hockey player
- Brady Quinn (born 1984), American football player
- Brady Tkachuk (born 1999), American ice hockey player
