= Bradie =

Bradie is a given name and surname. People with the name include:

- Bradie Ewing (born 1989), American former National Football League player
- Bradie James (born 1981), American National Football League player
- Bradie Tennell (born 1998), American figure skater
- Stuart Bradie (born 1966), Scottish businessman

== See also ==
- Brady (disambiguation)
