= Brady Township =

Brady Township may refer to:

- Brady Township, Kalamazoo County, Michigan
- Brady Township, Saginaw County, Michigan
- Brady Township, Ohio
- Brady Township, Butler County, Pennsylvania
- Brady Township, Clarion County, Pennsylvania
- Brady Township, Clearfield County, Pennsylvania
- Brady Township, Huntingdon County, Pennsylvania
- Brady Township, Lycoming County, Pennsylvania
