= USA Powerlifting =

American powerlifting organization

- Sport: Powerlifting
- Jurisdiction: National, International
- Chairman: Larry Maile

Official website
- www.usapowerlifting.com
- (United States)

USA Powerlifting (USAPL) is a national and international powerlifting organization based in the United States. The USAPL sanctions local, regional, national, and international meets in the United States and several other member countries. The president of the USAPL is Larry Maile.

The USAPL is a drug-tested organization and restricts the usage of equipment to single-ply suits and shirts in the equipped division. The raw division of the USAPL allows wrist wraps and knee sleeves as well as a lifting belt.

In 2018, USA Powerlifting denied female transgender weightlifter JayCee Cooper's application to compete in the women's category and revoked her competitive status, rendering her ineligible to compete in any future USA Powerlifting events. In 2019, USAPL announced that transgender women would not be allowed to compete as women. On January 14, 2021, Cooper launched a discrimination lawsuit against USA Powerlifting in the District Court of Minnesota. In late February 2023, a Minnesota District Court ruled that USA Powerlifting must permit transgender athletes to compete. The ruling was affirmed by the Minnesota Court of Appeals in March 2024.

In November 2021, USA Powerlifting was controversially expelled from the International Powerlifting Federation (IPF) after it failed to comply with changes to some of the IPF's WADA (World Anti-Doping Agency) drug testing policies. USAPL had expressed that the new policies would make the competitions more expensive and that therapeutic use exemptions may be processed counter to USAPL guidelines. Since then, USA Powerlifting has expanded to become an international organization, including countries such as Australia, Ireland, and South Korea. In place of IPF World Championships, USA Powerlifting has started the USA Powerlifting Pro Series Circuit and the USA Powerlifting Open World Cup.

== Age divisions ==
=== Women and men ===
- OPEN: From the day she/he reaches 14 years and upwards (no category restrictions need apply).
- YOUTH:
  - 1. From the day she/he reaches 8 years to the day before he reaches 10 years.
  - 2. From the day she/he reaches 10 years to the day before he reaches 12 years.
  - 3. From the day she/he reaches 12 years to the day before he reaches 14 years.
- TEEN:
  - 1. From the day she/he reaches 14 years to the day before he reaches 16 years.
  - 2. From the day she/he reaches 16 years to the day before he reaches 18 years.
  - 3. From the day she/he reaches 18 years to the day before he reaches 20 years.
- JUNIOR: From the day she/he reaches 20 years to the day before he reaches 24 years.
- MASTERS:
  - 1A. From 1 January in the calendar year she/he reaches 40 years and throughout the full calendar year in which she/he reaches 44 years.
  - 1B. From 1 January in the calendar year she/he reaches 45 years and throughout the full calendar year in which she/he reaches 49 years.
  - 2A. From 1 January in the calendar year she/he reaches 50 years and throughout the full calendar year in which she/he reaches 54 years.
  - 2B. From 1 January in the calendar year she/he reaches 55 years and throughout the full calendar year in which she/he reaches 59 years.
  - 3A. From 1 January in the calendar year she/he reaches 60 years and throughout the full calendar year in which she/he reaches 64 years.
  - 3B. From 1 January in the calendar year she/he reaches 65 years and throughout the full calendar year in which she/he reaches 69 years.
  - 4A. From 1 January in the calendar year she/he reaches 70 years and throughout the full calendar year in which she/he reaches 74 years.
  - 4B. From 1 January in the calendar year she/he reaches 75 years and throughout the full calendar year in which she/he reaches 79 years.

== USAPL Open National Championships ==
=== Men's Open ===
Year	52 kilograms	56 kilograms	60 kilograms	67.5 kilograms	75 kilograms	82.5 kilograms	90 kilograms	100 kilograms	110 kilograms	125 kilograms	145 kilograms	Open
1995	W. Jackson	D. Weiss	B. Olson	J. Benemerito	B. Bridges	Ray Benemerito	J. MacAuliffe	J. Morton	C. Siapanides	T. Leiato	B. Moore	Mark Henry
1996	S. Snyder	D. Weiss	B. Olson	T. Conyers	M. Beavers	Ray Benemerito	J. MacAuliffe	J. Morton	B. Stewart	Nick Best	Mark Philippi	B. Moore
1997	Ervin Gainer	M. Wynn	D. Weiss	G. Page	J. Benemerito	M. Beavers	Ray Benemerito	J. Morton	W. Croner	Nick Best	B. Moore	Mark Henry

Year	52 kilograms	56 kilograms	60 kilograms	67.5 kilograms	75 kilograms	82.5 kilograms	90 kilograms	100 kilograms	110 kilograms	125 kilograms	Open
1998	Ervin Gainer	Wil Taylor	Timothy Taylor	Wade Hooper	Dan Austin	David Ricks	Ray Benemerito	Tony Harris	Jeff Douglas	Tony Leiato	Brad Gillingham
1999	Ervin Gainer	Wil Taylor	Timothy Taylor	Wade Hooper	Dan Austin	David Ricks	Ray Benemerito	Tony Harris	Kevin Stewart	Tony Leiato	Brad Gillingham
2000	Ervin Gainer	Allen Whigham	Timothy Taylor	Jeremy Arias	Wade Hooper	David Ricks	Ray Benemerito	Tony Harris	Jeff Douglas	Pat MgGettigan	Brad Gillingham
2001	Ervin Gainer	Domarrio Holloway	Timothy Taylor	Jeremy Arias	Wade Hooper	Daniel Austin	Robert Wagner	Ray Benemerito	Tony Harris	Anthony Cardella	Brad Gillingham
2002	Ervin Gainer	Alan Whigham	Timothy Taylor	Gregory Page	Wade Hooper	Robert Wagner	Ray Benemerito	Anthony Succarotte	Tony Harris	Willy Croner	Brian Siders
2003	Ervin Gainer	Domarrio Holloway	Hennis Washington	Scott Layman	Wade Hooper	Richard Salvagni	Ray Benemerito	Charr Gahagan	Tony Harris	Anthony Cardella	Brian Siders
2004	Ervin Gainer	Michael Kuhns	Caleb Williams	Gregory Simmons	Wade Hooper	Steven McLawchlin	Jason Beck	Charr Gahagan	Tony Harris	Anthony Cardella	Brian Siders
2005	Ervin Gainer	Doc Holloway	Hennis Washington	Keith Scisney	Wade Hooper	Steven McLawchlin	Ray Benemerito	Jason Beck	Tony Harris	Anthony Cardella	Brian Siders
2006	Ervin Gainer	Doc Holloway	Hennis Washington	Caleb Williams	Wade Hooper	David Ricks	Gregory Jones	Jason Beck	Nicholas Tylutki	Anthony Cardella	Brian Siders
2007		Ervin Gainer	Doc Holloway	Hennis Washington	Wade Hooper	David Ricks	Michael Bridges	Jason Beck	Tony Harris	Anthony Cardella	Brad Gillingham
2008		Billy Naquin jr.	Hennis Washington	Marcus Williams	Ereick Nickson	Wade Hooper	Dan Williams	Jeremy Hartman	Michael Mastrean	Michael Tuscherer	Brian Siders
2009		Christopher Tran	Michael Kuhns		Ereick Nickson	Eleuterio Acosta	Justin Walker	Brian Radulovich	Jeff Douglas	Michael Tuscherer	Randall Harris
2010		Christopher Tran	Michael Kuhns	Domario Holloway	Maliek Derstine	Dan Williams	Justin Walker	Nichlas Tylutki	Jonathon Krogman	Nicholas Weite	Brad Gillingham
2011		Eric Kupperstein	Nelson Boutte jr.	Curtis Spencer	Maliek Derstine	Dan Williams	Eric Kasabuske	Nichlas Tylutki	Jeff Douglas	Nicholas Weite	Brad Gillingham

Year	59 kilograms	66 kilograms	74 kilograms	83 kilograms	93 kilograms	105 kilograms	120 kilograms	120+ kilograms
2012	Hennis Washington	Jonathan Bareng	Maliek Derstine	Knute Douglas	David Ricks	Luis Jaimes	Steve Man	Blaine Sumner
2013	Chris Tran	Damario Halloway	Nathan Walton	Knute Douglas	Charlie Conner	Luis Jaimes	Steve Mann	Joe Cappellino
2014	Chris Tran	Damario Halloway	Nathan Walton	Maliek Derstine	Ian Bell	Mike Mastrean	Nick Weite	Joe Cappellino
2015	Chris Tran	Damario Halloway	Aaron Phillips	Knute Doulgas	Ian Bell	Charlie Conner	Steve Mann	Blaine Sumner
2016	Chris Tran	Charles Okpoko	Nathan Walton	Knute Douglas	Ian Bell	Charlie Conner	Preston Turner	Blaine Sumner
2017	Eric Kupperstein	James Vang	Stephen Lehew	Knute Douglas	Shane Brady	Garrett Bailey	Quintin Meyer	Michael Rodriquez
2018	Chris Tran	James Vang	Stephen Lehew	Knute Douglas	Shane Brady	Garrett Bailey	Quintin Meyer	Blaine Sumner
2019	Chris Tran	James Vang	Austin Perkins	Knute Douglas	Shane Brady	Gregory Johnson	Quintin Meyer	Blaine Sumner

=== Women's Open ===
Year	44 kilograms	47 kilograms	50 kilograms	52.5 kilograms	55 kilograms	58.5 kilograms	63 kilograms	70 kilograms	80 kilograms	90 kilograms	90+ kilograms
1997	Judith Gedney	Paula Kovalchik	Donna McKinney	Yeah-Chun Chang	D. Johnson-Cane	Ellen Stein	Angie Overdeer	Paula Houston	Betsy Ojanen	Erin Eisenberg	Deborah Ferrell

Year	44 kilograms	48 kilograms	52 kilograms	56 kilograms	60 kilograms	67.5 kilograms	75 kilograms	82.5 kilograms	90 kilograms	90+ kilograms
1998	Beth Grater	Paula Kovalchik	Yueh-Chun Chang	Sandra Mobley	Jennifer Rey-Fisher	Paula Houston	Leslie Look	Betsy Ojanen	Kadell Moore	Nellie Sale
1999	Zindy Coss	Sioux-z Hartwig	Jaqueline Davis	Sandra Mobley	Jennifer Rey	Paula Houston	Linda Jo Belsito	Leslie Look	Kadell Moore	Liz Willett
2000	Stephanie McMillian	Sioux-z Hartwig	Jackie Davis	Sandra Mobley	Ellen Stein	Donna Covington	Linda Jo Belsito	Leslie Look	Harriet Hall	Liz Willett
2001	Stephanie McMillian	Jennifer Maile	Sioux-z Hartwig	Michelle Amsden	Angie Overdeer	Kara Bohigian	Linda Jo Belsito	Leslie Look	Linda Schaefer	Liz Willett
2002	Erin Dickey	Jennifer Maile	Sioux-z Hartwig	Michelle Amsden	Bettina Altizer	Kara Bohigian	Priscilla Ribic	Leslie Look	Jessica Watkins	Liz Willett
2003	Ann Leverett	Jennifer Maile	Sioux-z Hartwig	Michelle Amsden	Bettina Altizer	Priscilla Ribic	Kimmie Everrett	Jessica Watkins	Linda Schaefer	Liz Willett
2004	Ashley Robbins	Jennifer Maile	Ashley Awalt	Carly Nogle	Bettina Altizer	Priscilla Ribic	Rebecca Phelps	Katie Ford	Bonica Brown	Liz Willett
2005	Cheryl Anderson	Caitlin Miller	Jennifer Maile	Ashley Awalt	Carly Nogle	Priscilla Ribic	Lynne Nelson	Disa Hatfield	Jessica Watkins	Harriet Hall
2006	Erin Dickey	Jonna Ocampo	Sioux-z Hartwig	Caitlin Miller	Carly Nogle	Priscilla Ribic	Liane Blyn	Disa Hatfield	Bonica Brown	Jessica O'Donnell
2007		Cheryl Anderson	Sioux-z Hartwig-Gary	Ashley Matherne	Jennifer Perry	Priscilla Ribic	Disa Hatfield	Liane Blyn	Bonica Brown	Jessica O'Donnell
2008		Michelle Van Dusen	Sioux-z Hartwig-Gary	Ashley Matherne	Jennifer Thompson	Priscilla Ribic	Daliann James	Liane Blyn	Bonica Brown	Jessica O'Donnell
2009		Cheryl Anderson	Sioux-z Hartwig-Gary	Rowena Lopez	Ellen Stein	Donna Marts	Priscilla Ribic	Daliann James	Jill Arnow	Harriet Hall
2010		Michelle Van Dusen	Sioux-z Hartwig-Gary	Katherine Clark	Kendra Miller	Alyssa Hitchcock	Sandra Sebastian	Liane Blyn	Jill Arnow	Jessica O'Donnell
2011		Alesha Summers	Sioux-z Hartwig-Gary	Rowena Lopez	Jennifer Thompson	Alyssa Hitchcock	Priscilla Ribic	Liane Blyn	Jill Arnow	Leigh West

Year	47 kilograms	52 kilograms	57 kilograms	63 kilograms	72 kilograms	84 kilograms	84+ kilograms
2012	Savannah May	Sioux-z Hartwig-Gary	Teale Adelmann	Alyssa Hitchcock	Priscilla Ribic	Liane Blyn	Leigh West
2013	Molly Zunker	Ren Yamashita	Rowena Lopez	Alyssa Hitchcock	Katie Van Dusen	Liane Blyn	Tiffany McKinney
2014	Taylor LaChappelle	Sioux-z Hartwig-Gary	Rowena Lopez	Katie Van Dusen	Priscilla Ribic	Liane Blyn	Bonica Brown
2015	Molly Zunker	Juanita Najera	Rowena Lopez	Lara Strum	Priscilla Ribic	Liane Blyn	Lakshmi Meadows
2016	Allegra Hudson	Juanita Najera	Rowena Lopez	Katie Van Dusen	Priscilla Ribic	Liane Blyn	Bonica Brown
2017	Janet Becerill	Juanita Najera	Kimberly Johnson	Shaina Vickery	Priscilla Ribic	Natalie Hanson	Rebecca Holcomb
2018	Susan Elwyn	Juanita Najera	Kimberly Johnson	Erin Waterman	Kelsey McCarthy	Natalie Hanson	Bonica Brown
2019	Callie Spohn	Allegra Hudson	Taylor LaChapelle	Giovanna Ortega	Kelsey McCarthy	Natalie Hanson	Bonica Brown

== Raw Powerlifting National Championships ==
The USAPL Raw Powerlifting National Championships have been contested since 2005. The Championships are broken up into the standard weight classes and age divisions (Teens, Juniors, Open, Masters). The Championships started out with around 150 lifters, but have now grown to over 1,000.

Teen National Champions

Junior National Champions

Open National Champions

Masters National Champions

== See also ==
- International Powerlifting Federation
- International World Games Association
- SportAccord
