= International Powerlifting Federation =

International sport governing body

- Sport: Powerlifting
- Jurisdiction: Worldwide
- Abbreviation: IPF
- Founded: 1972 (54 years ago)
- Headquarters: Luxembourg
- President: Sigurjon Petursson

Official website
- www.powerlifting.sport

The International Powerlifting Federation is an international governing body for the sport of powerlifting as recognized by the General Association of International Sports Federations (GAISF).

The IPF was founded in 1972, and comprises member federations from more than one hundred countries with new ones being added yearly. The first president of the federation was Robert Christ, from the United States of America.

The current IPF president is Sigurjon Petursson, from Iceland, elected at the IPF Congress in June 2025, after Gaston Parage resigned on 11th of March 2025. Parage was the longest serving IPF president, heading up the organization for 13 years.

The IPF is the largest powerlifting federation in the world.

IPF is a drug-tested powerlifting federation that restricts supportive equipment in both equipped and raw competitions to an approved list, which is updated from time to time. Typically in equipped competition, the usage is limited to single-ply polyester shirts and suits with knee wraps, while soft suits (also known as a singlet), wrist wraps, lifting belt, and neoprene knee sleeves are permitted in the classic powerlifting division (referred to as unequipped or raw competition).

== History ==
The first world powerlifting championship was held in 1971, with barely anyone from outside the U.S. participating. In 1972, the second world weightlifting championship event was held by the Amateur Athletic Union. A meeting took place in 1972 with delegates from competing countries with the mission of founding an organization which would be responsible for the new sport worldwide. This meeting took place in the Zembo Mosque in Harrisburg, Pennsylvania, during which the delegates unanimously approved the "International Powerlifting Federation", which became known as the IPF. The president elected at this meeting was George Foster.

IPF's founding IPF followed its first official championship in 1973. This championship took place at the Zembo Mosque in Harrisburg, Pennsylvania, USA. This championship consisted of 43 athletes, 23 of whom were American. In early 1973, American powerlifting meets were starting to include a 100kg weight class. Britain and other countries didn't have this weight class. They had a 52 kg weight class instead. The IPF did not have well-trained referees and a rulebook yet. The 1976 IPF World Championships changed that. This competition marked the advent of an IPF Rulebook with highly competent referees to even out the playing field. America had won 8 out of 10 weight classes contested. This allowed other countries to contest America's dominance.

The first women's world competition was in 1980 and took place in Lowell, Massachusetts. As well, the Junior (18 and under) and Master (40 and older) lifters appealed for major championships, so they were added on top of the men's open competition. The first IPF Masters competition was in September of 1983 in London, Canada. The first Junior Competition was held in Florida, USA. 1984 saw the first change in the IPF president, as Heinz Vierthaler was elected IPF president.

The World Championships came back to Great Britain in 1992, and this competition is when the congress approved the bench shirt. The popularity of this change led the IPF to introduce the bench press-only competition. As powerlifting got more popular worldwide, countries on the east coast started taking an interest. By 1996, Russian lifters were constantly winning competitions. During this time, there was a change in presidency. In 1995, Graham Fong of New Zealand was elected president. Another change came in 2000 when Norbert Wallauch of Austria became president before stepping down in 2007. Today, Detlev Albrings of Germany is the current IPF President.

The Sub-Junior competition was created in 2001 to encourage teenage lifters to participate in powerlifting. In 2001, the IPF started participating in the World Games.This was a huge success for the IPF and powerlifting. The same success was repeated in the 2005 World Games. The IPF was able to send even more lifters to the World Games in 2009.

2013 saw the addition of the Classic (or Equipped) and Raw categories to the competitions. The equipment allowed in both competitions was strictly limited to certain brands. Different rules were added and removed throughout the 2010s.

The IPF split from its long-time affiliation with USAPL in 2021, and Powerlifting America became the new American affiliate. This was due to a disagreement in the way lifters should be drug-tested. The IPF and its member nations implemented the World Anti-Doping Agency (WADA), which requires lifters to be free of any banned substance, and if they are caught, they would receive a ban from the IPF.

Effective on January 1, 202,7 the International Powerlifting Federation and its member nations will ban the use of stiff knee sleeves.[4] Due to this change, athletes competing in these sanctioned events, including regionals, nationals, and world championships, will not be able to use these knee sleeves. This is due to the International Powerlifting Federation's rulebook defining that knee sleeves athletes can use need to be made entirely or predominantly of a single ply of neoprene and with a non-supportive layer of fabric over the neoprene. The International Powerlifting Federation had a third-party analysis on these types of knee sleeves that explained how these knee sleeves do not fit the rulebook's characterization.

== World championships ==
- IPF Powerlifting World Championships
  - IPF Classic Powerlifting World Championships
  - IPF World Open Equipped Powerlifting Championships
- IPF World Bench Press Championship
  - IPF Classic Bench Press World Championship

== List of national affiliates by region ==
=== Africa ===
- Federation Algerienne Et De Powerlifting
- Cameroon Powerlifting Federation
- Ghana Powerlifting Federation
- Libyan Powerlifting Federation
- Libyan Weightlifting, Powerlifting and Bodybuilding Federation
- Moroccan Powerlifting/Armwrestling Association
- South African Powerlifting Federation
- Sierra Leone Powerlifting Association

=== Asia ===
- Asian Powerlifting Federation (link)
- Afghanistan Powerlifting Federation
- Hong Kong Weightlifting and Powerlifting Association
- Powerlifting India
- Indonesia Powerlifting Federation
- I.R. Iran Powerlifting Union
- Iraqi Powerlifting Federation
- Japan Powerlifting Association (JPA)
- Kazakhstan Powerlifting Federation
- Powerlifting Of South Korea (POSK) https://www.instagram.com/posk_korea/ (link)]
- Kyrgyzstan Powerlifting Federation
- Lebanon Powerlifting Federation - Provisional Member
- Malaysian Association for Powerlifting
- Mongolian United Powerlifting Federation
- Oman Committee for Weightlifting & Body-Building
- Pakistan Powerlifting Federation - Provisional Member
- Powerlifting Association of the Philippines (P.A.P.)
- Powerlifting Singapore
- Sri Lanka Powerlifting Federation - Provisional Member
- Chinese Taipei Powerlifting Association
- Sports Athletics Federation of Turkmenistan
- Thai Powerlifting Federation (link)
- UAE Powerlifting Association
- Uzbekistan Powerlifting Federation
- Vietnam Powerlifting Federation

=== Europe ===
- European Powerlifting Federation (link)
- Armenian Powerlifting Federation
- Österreichischer Verband für Kraftdreikampf (OEVK)
- Belarus Powerlifting Federation
- Royal Belgian Weightlifting Federation (FRBPH)
- Bulgarian Powerlifting Federation
- Croatia Powerlifting Federation
- Czech Powerlifting Federation
- Danish Powerlifting Federation
- Estonian Powerlifting Federation
- Finnish Powerlifting Federation
- Fédération française de force
- Georgian Federation of Athleticism
- Bundesverband Deutscher Kraftdreikämpfer e.V. (BVDK)
- British Powerlifting
- Hellenic Powerlifting Federation
- Hungarian Powerlifting Federation
- Icelandic Powerlifting Federation
- Irish Powerlifting Federation
- Israel Powerlifting Federation
- Federazione Italiana Powerlifting (F.I.P/L)
- Latvian Powerlifting Federation
- Lithuanian Powerlifting Federation
- Powerlifting & Weightlifting Federation Luxembourg (PWFL)
- Koninklijke Nederlandse Krachtsport- en Fitnessbond (KNKF), section Powerlifting
- Norwegian Powerlifting Federation
- Polski Związek Kulturystyki I Trójboju Siłowego
- Federatia Romana de Powerlifting
- Russian Powerlifting Federation
- Serbia Powerlifting Federation
- Slovak Bodybuilding, Fitness and Powerlifting Association
- Slovenian Powerlifting Federation
- Asociación Española de Powerlifting (AEP)
- Svenska Styrkelyftförbundet
- Swiss Powerlifting Congress
- NPB - Dutch Powerlifting Federation
- Ukraine Powerlifting Federation

=== North America ===
- Bahamas Powerlifting Federation
- British Virgin Islands Powerlifting Federation
- Canadian Powerlifting Union (link)
- Cayman Islands Powerlifting Organization
- Asociacion Deportiva de Levantamiento de Potencia (ADELEPO)
- Dominican Republic Powerlifting Federation - Provisional Member
- Federación Nacional de Levantamiento de Potencia de Guatemala
- Federación Mexicana de Powerlifting (FEMEPO)
- Powerlifting America
- Puerto Rico Powerlifting Federation
- Trinidad & Tobago Powerlifting Federation
- Virgin Islands Powerlifting Federation

=== Oceania ===
- Australian Powerlifting Alliance
- Fiji Powerlifting Federation
- Kiribati Powerlifting Federation - Provisional Member
- Marshall Islands Powerlifting Federation
- Comite Regional Halterophilie Force Athletique, Musculation et Culturisme de Nou
- New Zealand Powerlifting Federation
- Niue Island Powerlifting Association
- Papua New Guinea Amateur Weightlifting Association
- Nauru Powerlifting Federation
- Samoa Powerlifting Federation
- Tonga Powerlifting Federation
- Tuvalu Powerlifting Federation (TPF)

=== South America ===
- Federacion Argentina de Levantamientos de Potencia
- Confederacao Brasileira de Levantamentos Básicos (CBLB)
- Federación Colombiana de Levantamiento de Potencia (FECOP)
- Federación Ecuatoriana de Fisico Culturismo y Levantamiento de Potencia (FEFICULP)
- Guyana Amateur Powerlifting Federation
- Federacion Deportiva Nacional de Levantamiento de Potencia (FDNLP)
- Federacion Uruguaya de Potencia
- Suriname Powerlifting Federatie (SPF)

== See also ==
- International Powerlifting Federation - 1975 World Congress and Championships
- International World Games Association
- SportAccord
