= The World Log Lift Championships =

Annual strength competition

The World Log Lift Championships (sometimes referred to as World Log Lift Challenge) is an annual competition featuring strength athletes from all over the world, competing exclusively in the log clean and press. Created initially as part of the Strongman Champions League, it has since been part of Giants Live and the championship has been present in both series, Giants Live running one version of the championship and the World Log Lift Federation taking over the Strongman Champions League's variant of the championship.

== History ==
In its inaugural year 2008, the Strongman Champions League introduced the World Log Lift Championships. The event however had been a staple of strongman competitions since the early 1980s. Beginning with the 1980 World's Strongest Man contest, where Bill Kazmaier hoisted 157 kg (346 lb) to win the event and set a world record. Kazmaier then increased the record to 163 kg (359 lb) in 1981 World's Strongest Man. During 1987 Pure Strength, Jón Páll Sigmarsson lifted 163.5 kg (360 lb) and Kazmaier regained the record with 170 kg (375 lb) in 1988 World's Strongest Man. During 1989 Kraftur championships Jamie Reeves took the record up to 172.5 kg (380 lb). During 1992 World Mighty Man in Johannesburg, Manfred Hoeberl surpassed it with 175 kg (386 lb) until Reeves regained it with 180 kg (397 lb) on the same competition.

At 2002 Strongman Super Series in Sweden Svend Karlsen increased the record to 185 kg (408 lb) and at 2003 Strongman Super Series in Canada Hugo Girard took it to 186 kg (410 lb). At 2004 IFSA Ukraine Grand Prix, Žydrūnas Savickas set a new record with 188 kg (414 lb), and Raimunds Bergmanis brought it up to 190 kg (419 lb) at 2004 Strongman Super Series in Moscow.

Savickas began his long reign over the log lift world record starting in 2005, bringing it up to 200 kg (441 lb) at 2005 IFSA Hungary Grand Prix, and then to 202.5 kg (446 lb) at 2005 IFSA European Championships in Riga. At 2006 IFSA Russia Grand Prix, Savickas raised it to 205 kg (452 lb). In 2008 Savickas broke the record with 207.5 kg (457 lb) at 2008 SCL Holland and in 2009 with 212.5 kg (468 lb) at World Log Lift Championships. At 2012 Europe's Strongest Man Savickas renewed the record to 216 kg (476 lb) and then up to 217.5 kg (480 lb) at 2012 SCL Holland.

At 2012 World's Strongest Man Savickas brought the world record to 220 kg (485 lb) making it his tenth consecutive log lift world record. At 2013 Europe's Strongest Man, Savickas lifted 221 kg (487 lb) for another world record, followed by 222.5 kg (491 lb) at 2013 SCL World Log Lift Championships. At 2014 Arnold Brazil Savickas took the record to 223 kg (492 lb). 8 days later, at 2014 Giants Live Poland, Savickas took the world record to 227 kg (500 lb) and his final world record was 228 kg (503 lb), set at 2015 Arnold Brazil, marking it his sixteenth time breaking the world record.

At 2021 Giants Live world tour finals Cheick "Iron Biby" Sanou broke Savickas's final world record with 229 kg (505 lb), then at 2023 World Log Lift Championships in Glasgow with 230 kg (507 lb) and again at 2024 World Log Lift Championships in Birmingham, taking the log lift world record to 231 kg (509 lb) where it stands today.

=== Variations ===
==== WSM giant log ====
At 2010 World's Strongest Man, the organizers came up with a more challenging longer log where Savickas established a new world record with 210 kg (463 lb).

==== SCL giant log ====
At 2014 SCL FIBO, Strongman Champions League introduced a log which was thicker than any log which has been used before. Savickas took the record to 205 kg (452 lb) with this new giant log until it was broken by Krzysztof Radzikowski with 206 kg (454 lb) at 2015 SCL FIBO, and then by Graham Hicks with 207 kg (456 lb) at 2017 SCL FIBO.

Note: During Savickas's log lift world record reign of 16 occasions, the first six were with the standard log, seventh was with WSM giant log, eighth to twelfth were with the standard log, thirteenth was with SCL giant log and fourteenth to sixteenth were with the standard log.

== Champions ==
Year	Champion	Runner-up	Third place	Host location
2008	(Lithuania) Žydrūnas Savickas	(Russia) Mikhail Koklyaev (Ukraine) Oleksandr Lashyn (Poland) Sebastian Wenta		Vilnius, Lithuania
2009	(Lithuania) Žydrūnas Savickas	(Poland) Krzysztof Radzikowski	(Lithuania) Vidas Blekaitis	Kaunas, Lithuania
2011	(Lithuania) Žydrūnas Savickas	(Lithuania) Vidas Blekaitis	(Lithuania) Vytautas Lalas (Germany) Patrick Baboumian (Serbia) Ervin Katona	Vilnius, Lithuania
2012	(Lithuania) Žydrūnas Savickas	(Poland) Krzysztof Radzikowski	(Lithuania) Vytautas Lalas (Lithuania) Vidas Blekaitis (Russia) Mikhail Koklyaev	Vilnius, Lithuania
2013	(Lithuania) Žydrūnas Savickas	(Lithuania) Vidas Blekaitis	(Poland) Krzysztof Radzikowski	Vilnius, Lithuania
2015 GL	(England) Graham Hicks (England) Eddie Hall (Lithuania) Žydrūnas Savickas			Doncaster, England
2015 WLLF	(Lithuania) Vidas Blekaitis	(Poland) Krzysztof Radzikowski	(Latvia) Dainis Zageris	Vilnius, Lithuania
2016	(United States) Rob Kearney (Lithuania) Vidas Blekaitis		(Lithuania) Vytautas Lalas	Vilnius, Lithuania
2017	(England) Graham Hicks	(Lithuania) Vidas Blekaitis (Lithuania) Vytautas Lalas		Vilnius, Lithuania
2018 GL	(Burkina Faso) Cheick "Iron Biby" Sanou (England) Eddie Hall (Iceland) Hafþór Júlíus Björnsson			Leeds, England
2018 WLLF	(Lithuania) Žydrūnas Savickas	(Lithuania) Vidas Blekaitis	(Latvia) Dainis Zageris	Alytus, Lithuania
2019 GL	(Burkina Faso) Cheick "Iron Biby" Sanou	(United States) Rob Kearney (England) Graham Hicks (Poland) Mateusz Kieliszkowski		Leeds, England
2019 WLLF	(Australia) Rongo Keene	(Lithuania) Vidas Blekaitis (Slovakia) František Piros (South Africa) Jared Leask		Panevežys, Lithuania
2021	(Scotland) Luke Stoltman (England) Graham Hicks		(Ukraine) Oleksii Novikov	Leeds, England
2022 GL	(Burkina Faso) Cheick "Iron Biby" Sanou (Scotland) Luke Stoltman		(United States) Bobby Thompson	Leeds, England
2022 WLLF	(Latvia) Didzis Zariņš	(England) Jack Osborn (Germany) Dennis Kohlruss (United States) Jacob Finerty		Ipswich, England
2023	(Burkina Faso) Cheick "Iron Biby" Sanou	(Scotland) Tom Stoltman	(United States) Tyler Cotton (Canada) Mitchell Hooper (Ukraine) Pavlo Kordiyaka (Scotland) Luke Stoltman	Glasgow, Scotland
2023 WLLF	(Republic of Ireland) Sean Gillen	(Germany) Dennis Biesenbach	(Czech Republic) Tomáš Sikora	Southampton, England
2024	(Burkina Faso) Cheick "Iron Biby" Sanou	(Czech Republic) Ondřej Fojtů (Canada) Mitchell Hooper		Birmingham, England
2025	(England) Jack Osborn	(Czech Republic) Ondřej Fojtů	(Scotland) Tom Stoltman	Glasgow, Scotland

=== Multiple time champions ===
Champion	Country	Times	Years
Žydrūnas Savickas	Lithuania	7	2008, 2009, 2011, 2012, 2013, 2015 GL, 2018 WLLF
Cheick "Iron Biby" Sanou	Burkina Faso	5	2018 GL, 2019 GL, 2022 GL, 2023, 2024
Graham Hicks	England	3	2015 GL, 2017, 2021
Vidas Blekaitis	Lithuania	2	2015 WLLF, 2016
Eddie Hall	England	2	2015 GL, 2018 GL
Luke Stoltman	Scotland	2	2021, 2022 GL

== Heaviest Lifts ==
=== In History (Men) ===
#	Weight	Competitor	Event	World record?
1	231 kg (509 lb)	(Burkina Faso) Cheick "Iron Biby" Sanou	2024 World Log Lift Championships (England)	Yes
2	230 kg (507 lb)	(Burkina Faso) Cheick "Iron Biby" Sanou	2023 World Log Lift Championships (Scotland)	Yes
3	229 kg (505 lb)	(Burkina Faso) Cheick "Iron Biby" Sanou	2021 Giants Live World Tour Finals (Scotland)	Yes
4	228 kg (503 lb)	(Lithuania) Žydrūnas Savickas	2015 Força Bruta (Brazil)	Yes
5	227 kg (500 lb)	(Lithuania) Žydrūnas Savickas	2014 Giants Live Poland (Poland)	Yes
6	223 kg (492 lb)	(Lithuania) Žydrūnas Savickas	2014 Força Bruta (Brazil)	Yes
7	222.5 kg (491 lb)	(Lithuania) Žydrūnas Savickas	2013 World Log Lift Championships (Lithuania)	Yes
8	222.3 kg (490 lb)	(United States) Lucas Hatton	2025 Strongest Man on Earth (United States)	No
9	222 kg (489 lb)	(England) Jack Osborn	2025 World Log Lift Championships (Scotland)	No
10	221 kg (487 lb)	(Lithuania) Žydrūnas Savickas	2013 Europe's Strongest Man (England)	Yes
10	221 kg (487 lb)	(Scotland) Luke Stoltman	2020 World's Ultimate Strongman FOS (Scotland)	No

=== In History (Women) ===
#	Weight	Competitor	Event	World record?
1	145.8 kg (321.4 lb)	(Puerto Rico) Inez Carrasquillo	2023 Rainier Classic Pro/Am (United States)	Yes
2	140.8 kg (310.4 lb)	(Puerto Rico) Inez Carrasquillo	2023 Rainier Classic Pro/Am (United States)	Yes
3	140.6 kg (310 lb)	(Puerto Rico) Inez Carrasquillo	2024 North America's Strongest Woman (Canada)	No
4	140 kg (309 lb)	(England) Andrea Thompson	2022 SBD World Log Lift Championships (England)	Yes
5	136.5 kg (301 lb)	(United States) Nadia Stowers	2024 The Animal Cage ( United States)	No
6	136.1 kg (300.0 lb)	(United States) Victoria Long	2022 America's Strongest Woman (United States)	No
7	135 kg (298 lb)	(England) Andrea Thompson	2020 WUS Feats of Strength Event 10 (England)	Yes
8	131.5 kg (289.9 lb)	(Puerto Rico) Inez Carrasquillo	2023 Rainier Classic Pro/Am (United States)	No
8	131.5 kg (289.9 lb)	(Puerto Rico) Inez Carrasquillo	2022 America's Strongest Woman (United States)	No
10	130.6 kg (287.9 lb)	(United States) Nadia Stowers	2021 Static Monsters California (United States)	Yes (U82 class)

=== At the Championships ===
#	Weight	Competitor	Year	Record Set
1	231 kg (509 lb)	(Burkina Faso) Cheick "Iron Biby" Sanou	2024	World Record
2	230 kg (507 lb)	(Burkina Faso) Cheick "Iron Biby" Sanou	2023	World Record
3	222.5 kg (491 lb)	(Lithuania) Žydrūnas Savickas	2013	World Record
4	222 kg (489 lb)	(England) Jack Osborn	2025	British Record
5	220 kg (485 lb)	(Burkina Faso) Cheick "Iron Biby" Sanou	2019	Burkinabé Record
5	220 kg (485 lb)	(Czech Republic) Ondřej Fojtů	2025	World Junior Record
7	218 kg (481 lb)	(Scotland) Luke Stoltman	2022	-
7	218 kg (481 lb)	(Burkina Faso) Cheick "Iron Biby" Sanou	2022	-
9	215 kg (474 lb)	(Lithuania) Žydrūnas Savickas	2018 (WLLF)	-
10	214 kg (472 lb)	(United States) Rob Kearney	2019	American Record
10	214 kg (472 lb)	(England) Graham Hicks	2019	English Record
10	214 kg (472 lb)	(Poland) Mateusz Kieliszkowski	2019	-

=== Continental records (Men) ===
Region	Weight	Athlete	Nation	Year set
Africa	231 kg (509 lb)	Cheick "Iron Biby" Sanou ^{1}	Burkina Faso	2024
Europe	228 kg (503 lb)	Žydrūnas Savickas	Lithuania	2015
North, Central America and Caribbean	222.3 kg (490 lb)	Lucas Hatton	United States	2025
Asia	209 kg (461 lb)	Matin Alimohammadi	Iran	2021
Oceania	207.5 kg (457 lb)	Rongo Keene	Australia	2019
South America	185 kg (408 lb)	Emanuel Mendoza	Colombia	2022

^{1} Cheick Sanou, who is a Canadian citizen, has the heaviest lift for this region at 231 kg (509 lb), but is not listed as he has declared for Burkina Faso.

=== Continental records (Women) ===
Region	Weight	Athlete	Nation	Year set
North, Central America and Caribbean	145.8 kg (321.4 lb)	Inez Carrasquillo	Puerto Rico	2023
Europe	140 kg (309 lb)	Andrea Thompson	England	2022
Oceania	122.5 kg (270 lb)	Nicole Genrich	Australia	2024
Africa	109 kg (240 lb)	Cherry Muchindu	Zambia	2024
South America	100 kg (220 lb)	Fatima Cipriano	Brazil	2023
Asia	87 kg (192 lb)	Joyce Gail Reboton	Philippines	2018

== Event results ==
=== 2008 ===
Zydrunas Savickas entered the 2008 Log Lift World Championships as the clear favorite, and intended to set a new record with 212.5 kg (468 lb). Savickas' competitors included Mikhail Koklyaev, Ervin Katona, Sebastian Wenta, Oleksandr Lashyn, Tobias Ide, Agris Kazelniks, Oleksandr Pekanov, Krzysztof Radzikowski and Saulius Brusokas.

The competition, held in Lithuania, saw each lift judged by three officials similar to Powerlifting and Olympic Weightlifting. The referees were Strongman Champions League founders Ilkka Kinnunen, Marcel Mostert and Latvian weightlifter Viktors Ščerbatihs, who had won the bronze medal in the +105 kg (231 lb) superheavyweight class at the recent Beijing Olympics. One of the strongest contenders, Oleksandr Pekanov, who had a personal best of 190 kg (420 lb) missed his opener of 180 kg (400 lb) three times. However, a number of other athletes came away with personal records, and two National Records were set. Zydrunas Savickas missed his world record attempt of 212.5 kg (468 lb), but won the championships with his lift of 200 kg (440 lb).

==== Results ====
#	Name	Log Weight
1	(Lithuania) Žydrūnas Savickas	200 kg (440 lb)
2	(Russia) Mikhail Koklyaev	195 kg (430 lb)
2	(Ukraine) Oleksandr Lashyn	195 kg (430 lb)
2	(Poland) Sebastian Wenta	195 kg (430 lb)
5	(Poland) Krzysztof Radzikowski	180 kg (400 lb)
5	(Serbia) Ervin Katona	180 kg (400 lb)
7	(Latvia) Agris Kazeļņiks	170 kg (370 lb)
8	(Lithuania) Saulius Brusokas	160 kg (350 lb)
8	(Germany) Tobias Ide	160 kg (350 lb)

==== Records ====
Nation	Name	Log Weight
(Russia) Russian	Mikhail Koklyaev	195 kg (430 lb)
(Poland) Polish	Sebastian Wenta	195 kg (430 lb)
(Serbia) Serbian	Ervin Katona	180 kg (400 lb)

- Source of results:

=== 2009 ===
The championships took place in Kaunas, Lithuania on 21 November 2009.

==== Results ====
#	Name	Log Weight
1	(Lithuania) Žydrūnas Savickas	212.5 kg (468 lb)
2	(Poland) Krzysztof Radzikowski	195 kg (430 lb)
3	(Lithuania) Vidas Blekaitis	190 kg (420 lb)
4	(Serbia) Ervin Katona	180 kg (400 lb)
5	(Lithuania) Saulius Brusokas	170 kg (370 lb)
6	(Latvia) Agris Kazeļņiks	165 kg (364 lb)
6	(Latvia) Marys Leitis	165 kg (364 lb)
8	(Russia) Aleksandr Mantserov	160 kg (350 lb)
9	(Latvia) Dainis Zageris	150 kg (330 lb)

==== Records ====
Nation	Name	Log Weight
World	Žydrūnas Savickas	212.5 kg (468 lb)
(Lithuania) Lithuanian	Žydrūnas Savickas	212.5 kg (468 lb)
(Poland) Polish (Equalled)	Krzysztof Radzikowski	195 kg (430 lb)

- Source of results:

=== 2010 ===
The Log Lift Championships were not held in 2010, and was moved up to February 2011 to kick off the 2011 season of SCL.

=== 2011 ===
The 2011 World Log Lift Championships were held in Siemens Arena in Vilnius, Lithuania on 12 February 2011 to kick off the 2011 SCL season. Key competitors were reigning champion Zydrunas Savickas, Vidas Blekaitis and Vytautas Lalas who finished in the top 3 places respectively, with Zavickas winning his 3rd straight log lift title. There were 12 athletes in total, 3 athletes failed their opening weight on all 3 attempts. The event was broadcast live on Eurosport.

==== Results ====
#	Name	Log Weight
1	(Lithuania) Žydrūnas Savickas	192.5 kg (424 lb)
2	(Lithuania) Vidas Blekaitis	190 kg (420 lb)
3	(Lithuania) Vytautas Lalas	185 kg (408 lb)
3	(Germany) Patrik Baboumian	185 kg (408 lb)
3	(Serbia) Ervin Katona	185 kg (408 lb)
6	(Australia) Warrick Brant	182.5 kg (402 lb)
7	(Norway) Bjørn Andre Solvang	175 kg (386 lb)
7	(Latvia) Agris Kazeļņiks	175 kg (386 lb)
9	(United States) Marshall White	170 kg (370 lb)

==== Records ====
Nation	Name	Log Weight
(Germany) German	Patrik Baboumian	185 kg (408 lb)
(Serbia) Serbian	Ervin Katona	185 kg (408 lb)
(Australia) Australian	Warrick Brant	182.5 kg (402 lb)

=== 2012 ===
The 2012 World Log Lift Championships were held in Siemens Arena in Vilnius, Lithuania on Sunday 7 October 2012.

==== Results ====
#	Name	Log Weight
1	(Lithuania) Žydrūnas Savickas	210 kg (460 lb)
2	(Poland) Krzysztof Radzikowski	207.5 kg (457 lb)
3	(Lithuania) Vytautas Lalas	200 kg (440 lb)
3	(Lithuania) Vidas Blekaitis	200 kg (440 lb)
3	(Russia) Mikhail Koklyaev	200 kg (440 lb) (NR)
6	(Sweden) Johannes Årsjö	185 kg (408 lb)
7	(Canada) Jean-François "JF" Caron	170 kg (370 lb)
7	(Serbia) Ervin Katona	170 kg (370 lb)
7	(Netherlands) Alex Moonen	170 kg (370 lb)
7	(Finland) Juha-Matti Jarvi	170 kg (370 lb)
X	(South Africa) Ettiene Smit	No lift

==== Records ====
Nation	Name	Log Weight
(Russia) Russian	Mikhail Koklyaev	200 kg (440 lb)

=== 2013 ===
The 2013 World Log Lift Championships were held in Siemens Arena in Vilnius, Lithuania on Saturday 19 October 2013. Savickas set a new world record with a lift of 222.5 kg (491 lb).

==== Results ====
#	Name	Log Weight
1	(Lithuania) Žydrūnas Savickas	222.5 kg (491 lb)
2	(Lithuania) Vidas Blekaitis	205 kg (452 lb)
3	(Poland) Krzysztof Radzikowski	200 kg (440 lb)
4	(Latvia) Dainis Zageris	185 kg (408 lb)
5	(United States) Matt Wanat	180 kg (400 lb)

==== Records ====
Nation	Name	Log Weight
World	Žydrūnas Savickas	222.5 kg (491 lb)
(Lithuania) Lithuanian	Žydrūnas Savickas	222.5 kg (491 lb)

=== 2015 ===
The 2015 World Log Lift Championships were held at the Keepmoat Stadium in Doncaster, England on 14 February 2015. Savickas attempted to set a new world record with a lift of 228 kg (503 lb) but narrowly failed.

==== Results ====
#	Name	Log Weight
1	(England) Graham Hicks	211 kg (465 lb)
1	(England) Eddie Hall	211 kg (465 lb)
1	(Lithuania) Žydrūnas Savickas	211 kg (465 lb)
4	(Bulgaria) Dimitar Savatinov	200 kg (440 lb)
5	(Poland) Krzysztof Radzikowski	180 kg (400 lb)
5	(England) Rob Frampton	180 kg (400 lb)
5	(Iceland) Benedikt Magnússon	180 kg (400 lb)
5	(United States) Robert Oberst	180 kg (400 lb)
9	(Germany) Michael Blumstein	160 kg (350 lb)
9	(Northern Ireland) Brian Irwin	160 kg (350 lb)
9	(United States) Nick Best	160 kg (350 lb)
9	(Scotland) Luke Stoltman	160 kg (350 lb)
X	(England) Adam Bishop	No lift

==== Records ====
Nation	Name	Log Weight
(England) English	Graham Hicks	211 kg (465 lb)
(England) English	Eddie Hall	211 kg (465 lb)

=== 2016 ===
The 2016 World Log Lift Championships were held at the SCL Lithuania event in Vilnius.

==== Results ====
#	Name	Log Weight
1	(United States) Rob Kearney	202.5 kg (446 lb)
1	(Lithuania) Vidas Blekaitis	202.5 kg (446 lb)
3	(Lithuania) Vytautas Lalas	200 kg (440 lb)
4	(Bulgaria) Dimitar Savatinov	195 kg (430 lb)
5	(England) Graham Hicks	190 kg (420 lb)
5	(Latvia) Dainis Zageris	190 kg (420 lb)
5	(Poland) Gregorz Szymanski	190 kg (420 lb)
8	(Norway) Bjørn Andre Solvang	185 kg (408 lb)
9	(Brazil) Marcos Ferrari	182.5 kg (402 lb)
10	(Slovenia) Matjaz Belsak	180 kg (400 lb)
11	(Lithuania) Saulius Brusokas	175 kg (386 lb)
12	(Germany) Patrick Baboumian	170 kg (370 lb)

==== Records ====
Nation	Name	Log Weight
(Brazil) Brazilian	Marcos Ferrari	182.5 kg (402 lb)

=== 2017 ===
The 2017 World Log Lift Championships were held at the SCL Lithuania event in Vilnius.

==== Results ====
#	Name	Log Weight
1	(England) Graham Hicks	192.5 kg (424 lb)
2	(Lithuania) Vidas Blekaitis	180 kg (400 lb)
2	(Lithuania) Vytautas Lalas	180 kg (400 lb)
4	(Netherlands) Alex Moonen	170 kg (370 lb)
4	(Germany) Dennis Kohlruss	170 kg (370 lb)
4	(Czech Republic) Jiří Vytiska	170 kg (370 lb)
4	(Poland) Marcin Sendwicki	170 kg (370 lb)
8	(Lithuania) Martynas Brusokas	167 kg (368 lb)
9	(South Africa) Jared Leask	165 kg (364 lb)
10	(Georgia (country)) Ivan Makarov	160 kg (350 lb)
10	(Latvia) Oskars Martuzāns	160 kg (350 lb)
10	(England) Will Baggott	160 kg (350 lb)

=== 2018 ===
The 2018 World Log Lift Championships were held at the First Direct Arena in Leeds, England, as the opening event for Europe's Strongest Man. Cheick "Iron Biby" Sanou, Eddie Hall and Hafþór Júlíus Björnsson shared the first place. Sanou and Hall attempted a new world record but both failed.

#	Name	Log Weight
1	(Burkina Faso) Cheick "Iron Biby" Sanou	213 kg (470 lb)
1	(England) Eddie Hall	213 kg (470 lb)
1	(Iceland) Hafþór Júlíus Björnsson	213 kg (470 lb)
4	(Lithuania) Žydrūnas Savickas	200 kg (440 lb)
4	(Poland) Krzysztof Radzikowski	200 kg (440 lb)
4	(United States) Rob Kearney	200 kg (440 lb)
4	(England) Graham Hicks	200 kg (440 lb)
4	(Georgia (country)) Konstantine Janashia	200 kg (440 lb)
9	(Slovenia) Matjaz Belsak	190 kg (420 lb)
9	(United States) Robert Oberst	190 kg (420 lb)
11	(Poland) Mateusz Kieliszkowski	175 kg (386 lb)
11	(Lithuania) Vytautas Lalas	175 kg (386 lb)
X	(England) Terry Hollands	No lift
X	(England) Mark Felix	No lift

==== Records ====
Nation	Name	Log Weight
(Burkina Faso) Burkinabé	Cheick "Iron Biby" Sanou	213 kg (470 lb)
(England) English	Eddie Hall	213 kg (470 lb)
(Iceland) Icelandic	Hafþór Júlíus Björnsson	213 kg (470 lb)
(Georgia (country)) Georgian	Konstantine Janashia	200 kg (440 lb)

=== 2019 ===
In 2019, there were two World Log Lift Championships, the first of which was held at the First Direct Arena in Leeds, England, again, as the opening event for Europe's Strongest Man. Cheick "Iron Biby" Sanou attempted to set a new world record with a lift of 229 kg (505 lb) but narrowly failed. The second championship was run by the World Log Lift Federation in Lithuania.

==== Results (Giants Live) ====
#	Name	Log Weight
1	(Burkina Faso) Cheick "Iron Biby" Sanou	220 kg (485 lb)
2	(United States) Rob Kearney	214 kg (472 lb)
2	(England) Graham Hicks	214 kg (472 lb)
2	(Poland) Mateusz Kieliszkowski	214 kg (472 lb)
5	(Iceland) Hafþór Júlíus Björnsson	203 kg (448 lb)
5	(United States) Larry "Wheels" Williams	203 kg (448 lb)
5	(Georgia (country)) Konstantine Janashia	203 kg (448 lb)
8	(Russia) Mikhail Shivlyakov	190 kg (420 lb)
8	(Scotland) Tom Stoltman	190 kg (420 lb)
8	(Scotland) Luke Stoltman	190 kg (420 lb)
11	(England) Laurence Shahlaei	175 kg (386 lb)
X	(England) Adam Bishop	No lift
X	(England) Mark Felix	No lift

==== Records (Giants Live) ====
Nation	Name	Log Weight
(Burkina Faso) Burkinabé	Cheick "Iron Biby" Sanou	220 kg (490 lb)
(England) English	Graham Hicks	214 kg (472 lb)
(United States) American	Rob Kearney	214 kg (472 lb)
(Georgia (country)) Georgian	Konstantine Janashia	203 kg (448 lb)

==== Results (World Log Lift Federation) ====
#	Name	Log Weight
1	(Australia) Rongo Keene	207.5 kg (457 lb)
2	(Lithuania) Vidas Blekaitis	200 kg (440 lb)
2	(Slovakia) František Piros	200 kg (440 lb)
2	(South Africa) Jared Leask	200 kg (440 lb)
5	(Sweden) Joachim Gustafsson	192.5 kg (424 lb)
6	(Poland) Robert Cyrwus	190 kg (420 lb)
6	(Latvia) Didzis Zariņš	190 kg (420 lb)
8	(Ukraine) Oleg Pylypiak	185 kg (408 lb)
9	(Czech Republic) Jiří Vytiska	180 kg (400 lb)

==== Records (World Log Lift Federation) ====
Nation	Name	Log Weight
(Australia) Australian	Rongo Keene	207.5 kg (457 lb)
(Slovakia) Slovak	František Piros	200 kg (440 lb)
(South Africa) South African	Jared Leask	200 kg (440 lb)
World Junior	Oleg Pylypiak	185 kg (408 lb)

=== 2021 ===
The 2021 World Log Lift Championships were held at the First Direct Arena in Leeds, England, as the opening event for Europe's Strongest Man.

==== Results ====
#	Name	Log Weight
1	(Scotland) Luke Stoltman	195 kg (430 lb)
1	(England) Graham Hicks	195 kg (430 lb)
3	(Ukraine) Oleksii Novikov	180 kg (400 lb)
X	(Estonia) Rauno Heinla	No lift
X	(Lithuania) Marius Lalas	No lift
X	(England) Adam Bishop	No lift
X	(Estonia) Ervin Toots	No lift
X	(Sweden) Johnny Hansson	No lift
X	(Wales) Gavin Bilton	No lift
X	(Republic of Ireland) Pa O'Dwyder	No lift

=== 2022 ===
The 2022 World Log Lift Championships were held at the First Direct Arena in Leeds, England, as the opening event for Europe's Strongest Man.

==== Results ====
#	Name	Log Weight
1	(Burkina Faso) Cheick "Iron Biby" Sanou	218 kg (481 lb)
1	(Scotland) Luke Stoltman	218 kg (481 lb)
3	(United States) Bobby Thompson	200 kg (440 lb)
4	(Ukraine) Pavlo Kordiyaka	185 kg (408 lb)
4	(Ukraine) Oleksii Novikov	185 kg (408 lb)
4	(Iceland) Eyþór Ingólfsson Melsteð	185 kg (408 lb)
7	(Lithuania) Marius Lalas	170 kg (370 lb)
7	(England) Shane Flowers	170 kg (370 lb)
7	(Georgia (country)) Konstantine Janashia	170 kg (370 lb)
7	(Wales) Gavin Bilton	170 kg (370 lb)
X	(Estonia) Rauno Heinla	No lift
X	(Latvia) Aivars Šmaukstelis	No lift
X	(Netherlands) Kelvin de Ruiter	No lift
X	(Republic of Ireland) Pa O'Dwyer	No lift

=== 2023 ===
The 2023 World Log Lift Championships were held at the OVO Hydro in Glasgow, Scotland, as the opening event for the Giants Live World Tour Finals. Cheick "Iron Biby" Sanou broke the world record with a lift of 230 kg (510 lb).

==== Results (Giants Live) ====
#	Name	Log Weight
1	(Burkina Faso) Cheick "Iron Biby" Sanou	230 kg (507 lb)
2	(Scotland) Tom Stoltman	210 kg (460 lb)
3	(Ukraine) Pavlo Kordiyaka	200 kg (440 lb)
3	(United States) Tyler Cotton	200 kg (440 lb)
3	(Canada) Mitchell Hooper	200 kg (440 lb)
3	(Scotland) Luke Stoltman	200 kg (440 lb)
7	(Czech Republic) Ondřej Fojtů	186 kg (410 lb)
7	(New Zealand) Mathew Ragg	186 kg (410 lb)
9	(Ghana) Evans Aryee	170 kg (370 lb)
9	(Wales) Gavin Bilton	170 kg (370 lb)
9	(Australia) Eddie Williams	170 kg (370 lb)
X	(Scotland) Conor Curran	No lift
X	(Republic of Ireland) Pa O'Dwyer	No lift

==== Records (Giants Live) ====
Nation	Name	Log Weight
World	Cheick "Iron Biby" Sanou	230 kg (507 lb)
(Burkina Faso) Burkinabé	Cheick "Iron Biby" Sanou	230 kg (507 lb)

==== Results (World Log Lift Federation) ====
#	Name	Log Weight
1	(Republic of Ireland) Sean Gillen	200.4 kg (442 lb)
2	(Germany) Dennis Biesenbach	195 kg (430 lb)
3	(Czech Republic) Tomáš Sikora	187.5 kg (413 lb)
4	(Poland) Dawid Elgert	182.5 kg (402 lb)
5	(Australia) Macauley Tinker	180 kg (400 lb)
6	(United Kingdom) Nathan Gunvin	160 kg (350 lb)
7	(United Kingdom) Sam Morgan	155 kg (342 lb)
X	(United Kingdom) Charlie Stickley	No lift
X	(Lithuania) Paulius Luksa	No lift

==== Records (World Log Lift Federation) ====
Nation	Name	Log Weight
(Republic of Ireland) Irish	Sean Gillen	200.4 kg (442 lb)

=== 2024 ===
The 2024 World Log Lift Championships were held at the Utilita Arena Birmingham, as the opening event for the Giants Live World Open. Cheick "Iron Biby" Sanou broke the world record with a lift of 231 kg (509 lb).

==== Results ====
#	Name	Log Weight
1	(Burkina Faso) Cheick "Iron Biby" Sanou	231 kg (509 lb)
2	(Czech Republic) Ondřej Fojtů	210 kg (460 lb)
2	(Canada) Mitchell Hooper	210 kg (460 lb)
4	(Canada) Maxime Boudreault	185 kg (408 lb)
4	(United States) Thomas Evans	185 kg (408 lb)
4	(United States) Nathan Goltry	185 kg (408 lb)
4	(Ukraine) Oleksii Novikov	185 kg (408 lb)
4	(England) Luke Richardson	185 kg (408 lb)
9	(Wales) Gavin Bilton	170 kg (370 lb)
9	(United States) Kevin Faires	170 kg (370 lb)
9	(United States) Evan Singleton	170 kg (370 lb)
X	(Latvia) Aivars Šmaukstelis	No lift
X	(England) Paddy Haynes	No lift

==== Records ====
Nation	Name	Log Weight
World	Cheick "Iron Biby" Sanou	231 kg (509 lb)
(Burkina Faso) Burkinabé	Cheick "Iron Biby" Sanou	231 kg (509 lb)
(Canada) Canadian	Mitchell Hooper	210 kg (460 lb)
World Junior	Ondřej Fojtů	210 kg (460 lb)
(Czech Republic) Czech	Ondřej Fojtů	210 kg (460 lb)

=== 2025 ===
The 2025 World Log Lift Championships were held in Glasgow, Scotland, as the opening event for the Giants World Tour Finals.

==== Results ====
#	Name	Log Weight
1	(England) Jack Osborn	222 kg (489 lb)
2	(Czech Republic) Ondřej Fojtů	220 kg (485 lb)
3	(Scotland) Tom Stoltman	200 kg (441 lb)
4	(Ukraine) Oleg Pylypiak	190 kg (419 lb)
4	(England) Ryan Bennett	190 kg (419 lb)
4	(England) Luke Richardson	190 kg (419 lb)
7	(Ghana) Evans Aryee	180 kg (397 lb)
7	(Poland) Mateusz Kieliszkowski	180 kg (397 lb)
7	(England) Andrew Flynn	180 kg (397 lb)
7	(United States) Tim Buck	180 kg (397 lb)
7	(Canada) Maxime Boudreault	180 kg (397 lb)
7	(Wales) Gavin Bilton	180 kg (397 lb)
13	(Canada) James Jeffers	170 kg (375 lb)
X	(Scotland) Callum Crozier	No lift

==== Records ====
Nation	Name	Log Weight
(United Kingdom) British	Jack Osborn	222 kg (489 lb)
World Junior	Ondřej Fojtů	220 kg (485 lb)
(Czech Republic) Czech	Ondřej Fojtů	220 kg (485 lb)

== See also ==
- Europe's Strongest Man
- Giants Live
- Strongman Champions League
- Žydrūnas Savickas
- The World Deadlift Championships
