= Bjørn Andre Solvang =

Norwegian strongman

Personal information
- Nationality: Norwegian
- Born: 10 July 1987 (age 38)
- Occupation: Strongman
- Height: 6 ft 0.5 in (1.84 m)
- Weight: 115–120 kg (254–265 lb)
Medal record
Strongman
Representing Norway
World's Strongest Man
Qualified	2013 World's Strongest Man
Qualified	2014 World's Strongest Man
World's Strongest Viking
5th	2015 World's Strongest Viking
8th	2016 World's Strongest Viking
8th	2016 World's Strongest Viking
Strongman Champions League
2nd	2013 SCL Portugal
4th	2013 SCL Hungary
4th	2013 SCL Poland
3rd	2015 SCL Portugal
4th	2016 SCL Bulgaria
4th	2016 SCL Romania
Norway's Strongest Man
3rd	2010
3rd	2011
2nd	2013
3rd	2014
2nd	2015
1st	2017
2nd	2019

Bjørn Andre Solvang (born 10 July 1987) is a Norwegian Strongman from Hedmark.

Solvang participated in his first Norway's Strongest Man competition in 2008 where he emerged seventh place, and became the champion by 2017.

In his first appearance at World's Strongest Man competition in 2013 held in Sanya, China, he participated in the fourth qualifier group where Žydrūnas Savickas and Mike Burke made it to the finals. In his second appearance in 2014 also he participated in the fourth qualifier group where Savickas and Laurence Shahlaei made it to the finals.

Solvang's career best performances came in 2013 Strongman Champions League Portugal where he won second place behind Krzysztof Radzikowski, while defeating Vytautas Lalas and Terry Hollands. He also won third at 2013 Giants Live Hungary and 2015 SCL Portugal.

== Personal records ==
- Raw Deadlift (with straps) – 340 kg (750 lb)
- Log press – 200 kg (441 lb)
- Viking press (for reps) – 160 kg (353 lb) × 19 reps (facing the pivot/ pronated grip) (2016 World's Strongest Viking) (World Record)
- Arm over arm car pull (incline) – 9,000 kg (19,842 lb) for 20m course in 57.54 seconds (2014 Norway's Strongest Man) (World Record)
