= Cheick Sanou =

Burkina Faso weightlifter (born 1992)

Personal information
- Nickname: Iron Biby
- Nationality: Burkinabé
- Born: 20 April 1992 (age 34) Burkina Faso
- Height: 1.88 m (6 ft 2 in)
- Weight: 170–185 kg (375–408 lb)

Sport
- Sport: Strongman

Competition record

Strongman

Representing Burkina Faso

Giants Live
4th	2017 World Tour Finals
8th	2018 World Tour Finals
6th	2019 Giants Live World Tour Finals
3rd	2021 Strongman Classic

World's Ultimate Strongman
12th	2018 World's Ultimate Strongman
11th	2019 World's Ultimate Strongman

Ultimate Strongman
8th	2016 World Championships

Representing Canada

Giants Live
7th	2017 North American Open

Powerlifting

Representing Burkina Faso

WPC Junior Championships
1st	2014

Cheick Ahmed al-Hassan Sanou, also known as Iron Biby, is a Burkinabe strongman. He is five-time World Log Lift Champion and holds the Guinness World record for most overhead presses (of a person) in one minute.

As the current world record holder in the log clean and press, axle clean and press (using a strict press), and numerous unofficial records for other forms of overhead presses, Sanou is regarded as one of the strongest overhead pressers of all time.

== Early life ==
Sanou was born in Burkina Faso. He was a large child who was frequently bullied at school for his size; he earned the nickname "Biby" at an early age. He had early interests in sprinting, gymnastics, and basketball.

At age 17 he attended the University of Moncton in Canada, where he earned a business administration degree. During that period, he began his journey in weightlifting, showcasing exceptional talent early on.

In 2013, at age 21, Sanou entered and won his first powerlifting competition. Following his achievements in strongman, he acquired the moniker "Iron Biby".

== Strongman career ==
Sanou entered his first strongman competition in 2016, the Ultimate Strongman Junior World Championships in Canada. There, he placed 3rd. He progressed quickly in the sport, entering his first two Giants Live shows the following year.

Although Sanou has not had any major wins in multi-event competitions, he has gained a reputation as one of the greatest pressers in the world. He has won the Giants Live World Log Lift Championship a record five times. He has set several world records in the log press and axle press—he has held the log press record three separate times, most recently improving it by lifting 231 kg (509 lbs) at the Giants Live World Log Lift Championship in 2024.

Sanou has often struggled to train conventionally in his home country of Burkina Faso. He claimed to eat as many as eight chickens a day to maintain his weight throughout training. He has claimed that he does not use anabolic steroids.

While in Burkina Faso, Sanou often trains past midnight as it is too hot to train during the day.

== Personal records ==
- Log press – 231 kg (509 lb) (2024 Giants Live World tour finals) (World Record)

→ Sanou has broken this world record a total of three times, and has also done 233.5 kg (515 lb) during training

- Axle press (using strict press) – 217 kg (478 lb) (2021 Giants Live Strongman Classic) (World Record)

→ Even though it was surpassed in 2024 by Mitchell Hooper with 218 kg (481 lb), he utilized a split jerk technique hence Sanou's lift remains the heaviest using a strict press.

- Barbell push press – 260 kg (573 lb) (Unofficial World Record)
- Barbell strict press – 240 kg (529 lb) (Unofficial World Record)
- Barbell seated shoulder press – 273 kg (602 lb) (Unofficial heaviest overhead press of all time)
- Log press (for reps) – 180 kg (397 lb) x 5 reps (2019 World's Ultimate Strongman) (Joint World Record)
- Deadlift (Equipped with straps) – 425 kg (937 lb) (2024 Giants Live USA Strongman Championships) (National Record)

== Career achievements ==
- 1st Place at the 2018 World Log Lift Championships - 213 kg (470 lb) (tied with Hafþór Júlíus Björnsson and Eddie Hall) (African record)
- 1st Place at the 2019 World Log Lift Championships - 220 kg (485 lb)
- 1st Place at the 2022 World Log Lift Championships - 218 kg (481 lb) (tied with Luke Stoltman)
- 1st Place at the 2023 World Log Lift Championships - 230 kg (507 lb) (former world record)
- 1st Place at the 2024 World Log Lift Championships - 231 kg (509 lb) (world record)
- 3rd Place at the 2021 Giants Live Strongman Classic
- 3rd Place at the 2016 Ultimate Strongman Junior World Championships
- 4th Place at the 2017 Giants Live World Tour Finals
- 5th Place at the 2019 Giants Live World Tour Finals
- 1st Place in World Powerlifting Championship (junior class) (2014), both in bench press (217.5 kg) and deadlift (307.5 kg) at age 22
