= Saulius Brusokas =

Lithuanian weightlifter and strongman competitor

Saulius Brusokas (born 4 December 1968) is a Lithuanian male weightlifter and strongman competitor from Marijampolė. He competed as a weightlifter in the +105 kg category and represented Lithuania at international competitions. He competed at world championships, most recently at the 1999 World Weightlifting Championships.

Between 2002 and 2013 he won seven medals at the Lithuania's Strongest Man, but never the gold one. On 24 October 2005, Brusokas represented Lithuania in a team competition with Vidas Blekaitis, Žydrūnas Savickas and Vilius Petrauskas at the IFSA World's Strongest Nation contest in Ukraine. Team Lithuania team placed 5th overall. Brusokas participated at the 2006 IFSA Strongman World Championships and 2007 IFSA Strongman World Championships. He placed third in the Strongman Champions League contest in Lithuania on 2 August 2008 and he placed second on 22 September 2012 during the contest in Bansko, Bulgaria.
