= 2013 World's Strongest Man =

Strongman competition in 2013

Competition information
- Dates: 17-24 August 2013
- Venue: Haitang Bay
- Location: Sanya
- Country: China
- Athletes participating: 30
- Nations participating: 18

Champion(s)
- (United States) Brian Shaw

The 2013 World's Strongest Man was the 36th edition of World's Strongest Man. The event was held in Haitang Bay, Sanya, China, the same host city as the 2006 World's Strongest Man contest. The qualifying heats were held from August 17–20 and the finals on Aug. 23 & 24. The event was sponsored by the Commerce Casino and will be broadcast in the United States on the CBS Sports Network. Brian Shaw from the United States placed first, winning his second WSM title after winning in 2011. Zydrunas Savickas from Lithuania was second after finishing 1st the year before, and Hafþór Júlíus Björnsson from Iceland was third for the second year in a row.

== Participants ==
- Hafþór Júlíus Björnsson (Iceland)
- Robert Oberst (United States)
- Lauri Nami (Estonia)
- Nick Best (United States)
- Laurence Shahlaei (England)
- Long Wu (China)
- Vytautas Lalas (Lithuania)
- Johannes Årsjö (Sweden)
- Jerry Pritchett (United States)
- Gerhard Van Staden (South Africa)
- Graham Hicks (England)
- Scott Cummine (Canada)
- Brian Shaw (United States)
- Terry Hollands (England)
- Martin Wildauer (Austria)
- Dainis Zageris (Latvia)
- Juha Matt Jarvi (Finland)
- Frankie Scheun (South Africa)
- Zydrunas Savickas (Lithuania)
- Mike Burke (United States)
- Krzysztof Radzikowski (Poland)
- Mark Felix (England)
- Bjørn Andre Solvang (Norway)
- Alex Moonen (Netherlands)
- Mikhail Koklyaev (Russia)
- Mike Jenkins (United States)
- Eddie Hall (England)
- Warrick Brant (Australia)
- Akos Nagy (Hungary)
- Lloyd Renals (England)

== Qualifying Heats ==
=== Heat 1 ===
#	Name	Nationality	Pts
1	Hafþór Júlíus Björnsson	Iceland	31.5
2	Robert Oberst	United States	29
3	Lauri Nami	Estonia	24
4	Nick Best	United States	14.5
5	Laurence Shahlaei	England	12
6	Long Wu	China	6

=== Heat 2 ===
#	Name	Nationality	Pts
1	Vytautas Lalas	Lithuania	29
2	Johannes Arsjo	Sweden	29
3	Jerry Pritchett	United States	20
4	Gerhard Van Staden	South Africa	18
5	Graham Hicks	England	16
6	Scott Cummine	Canada	14

=== Heat 3 ===
#	Name	Nationality	Pts
1	Brian Shaw	United States	34
2	Terry Hollands	England	28
3	Martin Wildauer	Austria	23.5
4	Dainis Zageris	Latvia	19
5	Juha Matt Jarvi	Finland	11
6	Frankie Scheun	South Africa	10.5

=== Heat 4 ===
#	Name	Nationality	Pts
1	Zydrunas Savickas	Lithuania	29.5
2	Mike Burke	United States	27.5
3	Krzysztof Radzikowski	Poland	22.5
4	Mark Felix	England	21
5	Bjørn Andre Solvang	Norway	14
6	Alex Moonen	Netherlands	11.5

=== Heat 5 ===
#	Name	Nationality	Pts
1	Mikhail Koklyaev	Russia	25.5
2	Mike Jenkins	United States	25
3	Eddie Hall	England	24
4	Warrick Brant	Australia	21.5
5	Akos Nagy	Hungary	15
6	Lloyd Renals	England	14

== Finals events results ==
=== Event 1: Frame Carry ===
- Weight: 375 kilograms (827 lb)
- Course length: 30 metres (98 ft)
- Time limit: 60 seconds

#	Name	Nationality	Time (sec)	Event Pts	Overall Pts
1	Mike Jenkins	United States	20.14	10	10
2	Mike Burke	United States	21.30	9	9
3	Terry Hollands	England	36.71	8	8
4	Hafþór Júlíus Björnsson	Iceland	43.47	7	7
5	Brian Shaw	United States	25.7 metres (84 ft)	6	6
6	Zydrunas Savickas	Lithuania	19.7 metres (65 ft)	5	5
7	Vytautas Lalas	Lithuania	15.9 metres (52 ft)	4	4
8	Robert Oberst	United States	15 metres (49 ft)	3	3
9	Mikhail Koklyaev	Russia	12.7 metres (42 ft)	2	2
10	Johannes Årsjö	Sweden	0.4 metres (1.3 ft)	1	1

=== Event 2: Truck Pull ===
- Weight: 16,000 kilograms (35,000 lb)
- Course length: 25 metres (82 ft)
- Time limit: 75 seconds

#	Name	Nationality	Time (sec)	Event Pts	Overall Pts
1	Hafþór Júlíus Björnsson	Iceland	40.19	10	17
2	Brian Shaw	United States	41.23	9	15
3	Terry Hollands	England	42.47	8	16
4	Zydrunas Savickas	Lithuania	45.81	7	12
5	Vytautas Lalas	Lithuania	45.92	6	10
6	Mike Burke	United States	46.95	5	14
7	Mike Jenkins	United States	49.77	4	14
8	Johannes Årsjö	Sweden	50.21	3	4
9	Robert Oberst	United States	54.98	2	5

=== Event 3: Super Yoke ===
- Weight: 480 kilograms (1,060 lb)
- Course length: 20 metres (66 ft)
- Time limit: 60 seconds

#	Name	Nationality	Time (sec)	Event Pts	Overall Pts
1	Brian Shaw	United States	13.64	10	25
2	Zydrunas Savickas	Lithuania	14.16	9	21
3	Terry Hollands	England	16.51	8	24
4	Vytautas Lalas	Lithuania	16.57	7	17
5	Mike Jenkins	United States	16.94	6	20
6	Hafþór Júlíus Björnsson	Iceland	17.77	5	22
7	Mike Burke	United States	19.03	4	18
8	Robert Oberst	United States	22.16	3	8
9	Johannes Årsjö	Sweden	29.35	2	6

=== Event 4: Max Deadlift ===
#	Name	Nationality	Weight	Event Pts	Overall Pts
1	Brian Shaw	United States	442.5 kilograms (976 lb)	10	35
2	Zydrunas Savickas	Lithuania	420 kilograms (930 lb)	9	30
3	Vytautas Lalas	Lithuania	400 kilograms (880 lb)	7	24
3	Mike Jenkins	United States	400 kilograms (880 lb)	7	27
3	Hafþór Júlíus Björnsson	Iceland	400 kilograms (880 lb)	7	29
6	Terry Hollands	England	370 kilograms (820 lb)	4.5	28.5
6	Mike Burke	United States	370 kilograms (820 lb)	4.5	22.5
8	Robert Oberst	United States	No lift	0	8
8	Johannes Årsjö	Sweden	No lift	0	6

=== Event 5: Overhead Medley ===
- Weight: 1 x 110 kilograms (240 lb) dumbbell, 1 x 170 kilograms (370 lb) barbell, 1 x 120 kilograms (260 lb) dumbbell, 1 x 180 kilograms (400 lb) barbell
- Time limit: 75 seconds

#	Name	Nationality	Time (sec)	Event Pts	Overall Pts
1	Zydrunas Savickas	Lithuania	4 in 43.53	10	40
2	Mike Burke	United States	4 in 1m 8.17	9	31.5
3	Mike Jenkins	United States	3 in 43.56	8	35
4	Brian Shaw	United States	2 in 19.56	7	42
5	Vytautas Lalas	Lithuania	2 in 28.00	6	30
6	Johannes Årsjö	Sweden	2 in 34.36	5	11
7	Robert Oberst	United States	2 in 47.83	4	12
8	Hafþór Júlíus Björnsson	Iceland	1 in 23.51	3	32
9	Terry Hollands	England	-	0	28.5

=== Event 6: Atlas Stones ===
- Weight: 5 Stone series ranging from 130–186 kilograms (287–410 lb)
- Time limit: 60 seconds

#	Name	Nationality	Time (sec)	Event Pts	Overall Pts
1	Hafþór Júlíus Björnsson	Iceland	5 in 23.31	10	42
2	Brian Shaw	United States	5 in 24.82	9	51
3	Zydrunas Savickas	Lithuania	5 in 25.63	8	48
4	Mike Burke	United States	5 in 27.16	7	38.5
5	Mike Jenkins	United States	5 in 31.10	6	41
6	Johannes Årsjö	Sweden	5 in 35.27	5	16
7	Vytautas Lalas	Lithuania	5 in 48.80	4	34
8	Terry Hollands	England	4 in 35.66	3	31.5
9	Robert Oberst	United States	4 in 38.76	2	14

== Final standings ==
#	Name	Nationality	Pts
1st place, gold medalist(s)	Brian Shaw	United States	51
2nd place, silver medalist(s)	Zydrunas Savickas	Lithuania	48
3rd place, bronze medalist(s)	Hafþór Júlíus Björnsson	Iceland	42
4	Mike Jenkins	United States	41
5	Mike Burke	United States	38.5
6	Vytautas Lalas	Lithuania	34
7	Terry Hollands	England	28 (injured)
8	Johannes Arsjo	Sweden	16
9	Robert Oberst	United States	14
10	Mikhail Koklyaev	Russia	2 (injured)

Preceded by 2012 World's Strongest Man	2013 World's Strongest Man	Succeeded by 2014 World's Strongest Man
