= 2018 World's Ultimate Strongman =

Competition information
- Dates: 26 October 2018
- Venue: Bab Al Shams Arena
- Location: Dubai
- Country: United Arab Emirates
- Athletes participating: 12
- Nations participating: 9

Champion(s)
- (Iceland) Hafþór Júlíus Björnsson

The 2018 World's Ultimate Strongman was the inaugural strongman competition organized by the strength federation 'World's Ultimate Strongman' with the participation of the 12 top strongmen of the world, determining who is the strongest. The competition took place at the Bab Al Shams arena in Dubai, United Arab Emirates on October 26 and held six brutal events within a single day.

The reigning and defending Iceland's Strongest Man, Europe's Strongest Man, World's Strongest Man and the Arnold Strongman Classic champion, Iceland's Hafþór Júlíus Björnsson won the competition while Brian Shaw of USA took second and Mateusz Kieliszkowski of Poland secured third place.

== Participants ==
- Hafþór Júlíus Björnsson (ISL)
- Jean-François Caron (CAN)
- Terry Hollands (UK)
- Konstantine Janashia (GEO)
- Mateusz Kieliszkowski (POL)
- Martins Licis (USA)
- Cheick Sanou (BUR)
- Žydrūnas Savickas (LTU)
- Laurence Shahlaei (UK)
- Brian Shaw (USA)
- Luke Stoltman (UK)
- Tom Stoltman (UK)

== Event results ==
=== Event 1: Truck pull ===
- Weight: 20,000 kilograms (44,000 lb) rocket launcher truck, uphill
- Course Length: 30 metres (98 ft)

#	Athlete	Nation	Time	Event Points	Overall Points
1	Terry Hollands	United Kingdom	TBC	12	12
2	Laurence Shahlaei	United Kingdom	TBC	11	11
3	Hafþór Júlíus Björnsson	Iceland	TBC	10	10
4	Brian Shaw	United States	TBC	9	9
5	Mateusz Kieliszkowski	Poland	TBC	8	8
6	JF Caron	Canada	TBC	7	7
7	Žydrūnas Savickas	Lithuania	TBC	6	6
8	Martins Licis	United States	TBC	5	5
9	Cheick Sanou	Burkina Faso	TBC	4	4
10	Luke Stoltman	United Kingdom	TBC	3	3
11	Konstantine Janashia	Georgia	TBC	2	2
12	Tom Stoltman	United Kingdom	TBC	1	1

=== Event 2: Arm over arm truck pull ===
- Weight: 12,000 kilograms (26,000 lb) truck
- Course Length: 20 metres (66 ft)

#	Athlete	Nation	Time	Event Points	Overall Points
1	Mateusz Kieliszkowski	Poland	TBC	11.5	19.5
1	JF Caron	Canada	TBC	11.5	18.5
3	Martins Licis	United States	TBC	10	15
4	Terry Hollands	United Kingdom	TBC	9	21
5	Brian Shaw	United States	TBC	8	17
6	Hafþór Júlíus Björnsson	Iceland	TBC	7	17
7	Konstantine Janashia	Georgia	TBC	6	8
8	Žydrūnas Savickas	Lithuania	TBC	5	11
9	Tom Stoltman	United Kingdom	TBC	4	5
10	Luke Stoltman	United Kingdom	TBC	3	6
11	Laurence Shahlaei	United Kingdom	TBC	2	13
12	Cheick Sanou	Burkina Faso	TBC	1	5

=== Event 3: Silver Dollar Deadlift ===
- Starting Weight: 400 kilograms (880 lb)
- Notes: The bar height is 18 inches from the floor.

#	Athlete	Nation	Weight	Event Points	Overall Points
1	Hafþór Júlíus Björnsson	Iceland	520 kg (1,146 lb)	11.5	28.5
1	JF Caron	Canada	520 kg (1,146 lb)	11.5	30
3	Konstantine Janashia	Georgia	510 kg (1,124 lb)	10	18
4	Brian Shaw	United States	490 kg (1,080 lb)	9	26
5	Martins Licis	United States	460 kg (1,014 lb)	6.5	21.5
5	Žydrūnas Savickas	Lithuania	460 kg (1,014 lb)	6.5	17.5
5	Tom Stoltman	United Kingdom	460 kg (1,014 lb)	6.5	11.5
5	Laurence Shahlaei	United Kingdom	460 kg (1,014 lb)	6.5	19.5
9	Mateusz Kieliszkowski	Poland	430 kg (948 lb)	3	22.5
9	Terry Hollands	United Kingdom	430 kg (948 lb)	3	24
9	Luke Stoltman	United Kingdom	430 kg (948 lb)	3	9
12	Cheick Sanou	Burkina Faso	400 kg (882 lb)	1	6

=== Event 4: Overhead Medley ===
- Implements & Weights: 160 kg (353 lb) log, 100 kg (220 lb) circus dumbbell (with one hand), 160 kg (353 lb) axle, and 140 kg (309 lb) shield.

#	Athlete	Nation	Time	Event Points	Overall Points
1	Mateusz Kieliszkowski	Poland	All 4 implements	12	34.5
2	Hafþór Júlíus Björnsson	Iceland	All 4 implements	11	39.5
3	Brian Shaw	United States	All 4 implements	10	36
4	Cheick Sanou	Burkina Faso	3 implements	9	15
5	JF Caron	Canada	2 implements	8	38
6	Luke Stoltman	United Kingdom	2 implements	7	16
7	Žydrūnas Savickas	Lithuania	2 implements	6	23.5
8	Konstantine Janashia	Georgia	2 implements	5	23
9	Laurence Shahlaei	United Kingdom	2 implements	4	23.5
10	Martins Licis	United States	2 implements	3	24.5
11	Tom Stoltman	United Kingdom	1 implement	2	13.5
12	Terry Hollands	United Kingdom	No lift	0	24

=== Event 5: Super Yoke ===
- Weight: 580 kg (1,279 lb)
- Course Length: 15 metres (49 ft)

#	Athlete	Nation	Time	Event Points	Overall Points
1	Laurence Shahlaei	United Kingdom	TBC	12	35.5
2	Hafþór Júlíus Björnsson	Iceland	TBC	11	50.5
3	Mateusz Kieliszkowski	Poland	TBC	10	44.5
4	Brian Shaw	United States	TBC	9	45
5	Martins Licis	United States	TBC	8	32.5
6	Tom Stoltman	United Kingdom	TBC	7	20.5
7	Konstantine Janashia	Georgia	TBC	6	29
8	Luke Stoltman	United Kingdom	TBC	5	21
9	JF Caron	Canada	TBC	4	42
10	Cheick Sanou	Burkina Faso	TBC	3	18
11	Terry Hollands	United Kingdom	TBC	2	26
12	Žydrūnas Savickas	Lithuania	TBC	1	24.5

=== Event 6: Atlas Stones ===
- Weight: 5 stones weighing 170–225 kg (375–496 lb).

#	Athlete	Nation	Time	Event Points	Overall Points
1	Brian Shaw	United States	TBC	12	57
2	Tom Stoltman	United Kingdom	TBC	11	31.5
3	Hafþór Júlíus Björnsson	Iceland	TBC	10	60.5
4	Konstantine Janashia	Georgia	TBC	9	38
5	Mateusz Kieliszkowski	Poland	TBC	8	52.5
6	Laurence Shahlaei	United Kingdom	TBC	7	42.5
7	JF Caron	Canada	TBC	6	48
8	Terry Hollands	United Kingdom	TBC	5	31
9	Luke Stoltman	United Kingdom	TBC	4	25
10	Žydrūnas Savickas	Lithuania	TBC	3	27.5
11	Martins Licis	United States	TBC	2	34.5
12	Cheick Sanou	Burkina Faso	TBC	0	18

== Final results ==
#	Athlete	Nation	Points
1st place, gold medalist(s)	Hafþór Júlíus Björnsson	Iceland	60.5
2nd place, silver medalist(s)	Brian Shaw	United States	57
3rd place, bronze medalist(s)	Mateusz Kieliszkowski	Poland	52.5
4	JF Caron	Canada	48
5	Laurence Shahlaei	United Kingdom	42.5
6	Konstantine Janashia	Georgia	38
7	Martins Licis	United States	34.5
8	Tom Stoltman	United Kingdom	31.5
9	Terry Hollands	United Kingdom	31
10	Žydrūnas Savickas	Lithuania	27.5
11	Luke Stoltman	United Kingdom	25
12	Cheick Sanou	Burkina Faso	18
