= Lithuania's Strongest Man =

Tournament information
- Location: Lithuania, various locations
- Established: 1989
- Format: Multi-event competition

Current champion
- (Lithuania) Tomas Šliupas (2026)

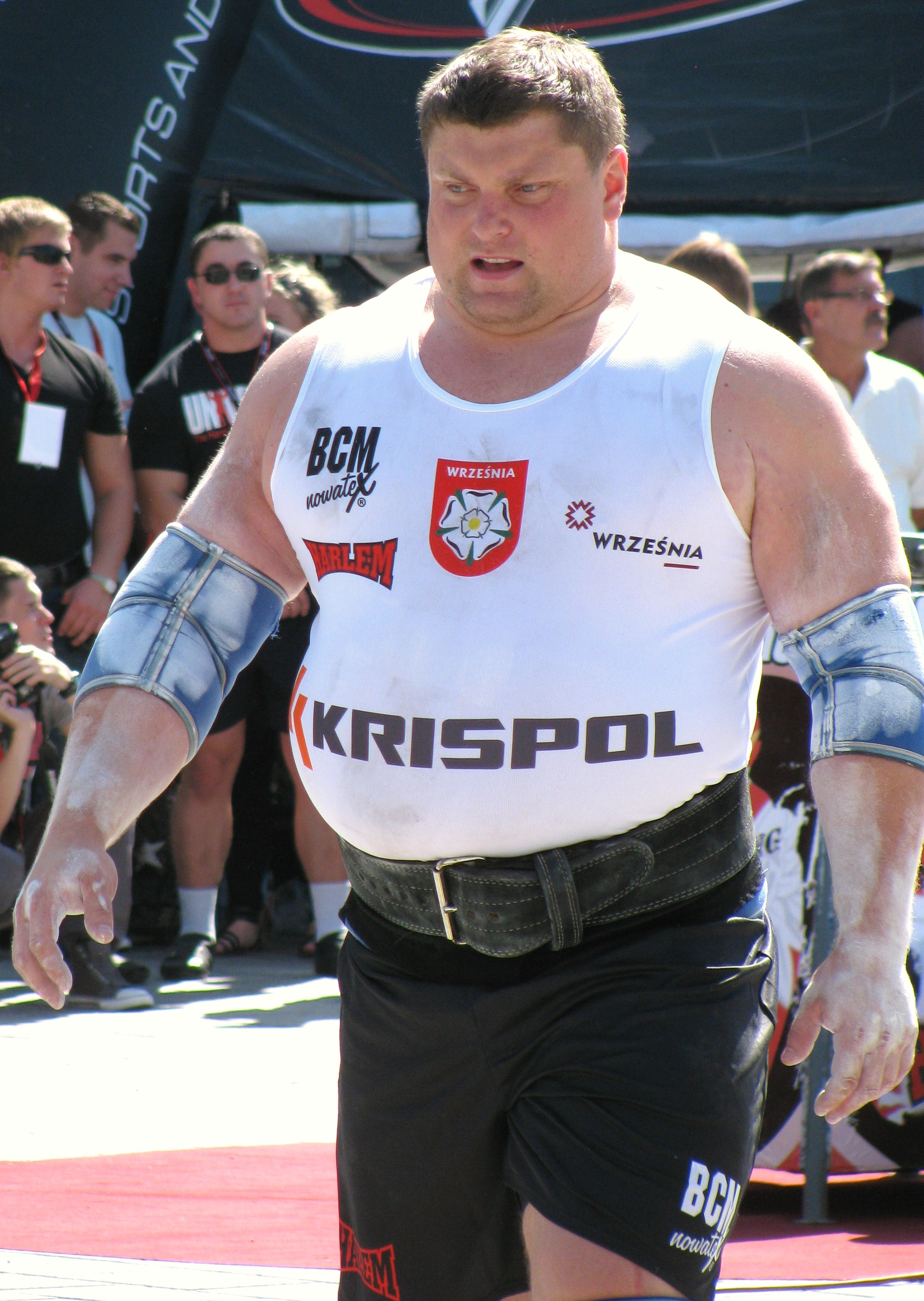
Zydrunas Savickas, the 17 times champion.

Lithuania's Strongest Man is an annual strongman contest held in Lithuania and features exclusively Lithuanian strength athletes. It is a multi event competition that tests competitors in a number of different events and the cumulative total of all the events determine who the winner is.

The competition has been held for 38 consecutive years and has produced 13 champions. Zydrunas Savickas has won the title a record 17 times including 10 consecutive years from 2004 to 2013. Raimundas Zelenkevicius has won the title 4 times.

== Results ==
Year	Champion	Runner-up	3rd place
1989	(Soviet Union) Raimundas Zenkevicius	(Soviet Union) Kestutis Cenkus	(Soviet Union) Arunas Vitkevicius
1990	(Soviet Union) Egidijus Karskis	(Soviet Union) Raimundas Zenkevicius	(Soviet Union) Edmundas Kvietinskas
1991	(Soviet Union) Raimundas Zenkevicius	(Soviet Union) Aleksandras Zukauskas	(Soviet Union) Egidijus Zaldokas
1992	(Lithuania) Alvydas Kirkliauskas	(Lithuania) Audrius Vosylius	(Lithuania) Arvydas Svegzda
1993	(Lithuania) Raimundas Zenkevicius	(Lithuania) Audrius Vosylius	(Lithuania) Alvydas Kirkliauskas
1994	(Lithuania) Raimundas Zenkevicius	(Lithuania) Stasys Mecius	(Lithuania) Alvydas Kirkliauskas
1995	(Lithuania) Stasys Mecius	(Lithuania) Karolis Rauba	(Lithuania) Alvydas Kirkliauskas
1996	(Lithuania) Stasys Mecius	(Lithuania) Arvydas Pintinas	(Lithuania) Žydrūnas Savickas
1997	(Lithuania) Arvydas Pintinas	(Lithuania) Žydrūnas Savickas	(Lithuania) Stasys Mecius
1998	(Lithuania) Žydrūnas Savickas	(Lithuania) Arvydas Pintinas	(Lithuania) Remigijus Kacinskis
1999	(Lithuania) Žydrūnas Savickas	(Lithuania) Remigijus Kacinskis	(Lithuania) Antanas Abrutis
2000	(Lithuania) Žydrūnas Savickas	(Lithuania) Vidas Blekaitis	(Lithuania) Antanas Abrutis
2001	(Lithuania) Antanas Abrutis	(Lithuania) Žydrūnas Savickas	(Lithuania) Vidas Blekaitis
2002	(Lithuania) Žydrūnas Savickas	(Lithuania) Vidas Blekaitis	(Lithuania) Saulius Brusokas
2003	(Lithuania) Vilius Petrauskas	(Lithuania) Saulius Brusokas	(Lithuania) Vidas Blekaitis
2004	(Lithuania) Žydrūnas Savickas	(Lithuania) Vilius Petrauskas	(Lithuania) Vidas Blekaitis
2005	(Lithuania) Žydrūnas Savickas	(Lithuania) Vidas Blekaitis	(Lithuania) Vilius Petrauskas
2006	(Lithuania) Žydrūnas Savickas	(Lithuania) Vidas Blekaitis	(Lithuania) Saulius Brusokas
2007	(Lithuania) Žydrūnas Savickas	(Lithuania) Vidas Blekaitis	(Lithuania) Saulius Brusokas
2008	(Lithuania) Žydrūnas Savickas	(Lithuania) Vidas Blekaitis	(Lithuania) Alvidas Brazdzius
2009	(Lithuania) Žydrūnas Savickas	(Lithuania) Vidas Blekaitis	(Lithuania) Vytautas Lalas
2010	(Lithuania) Žydrūnas Savickas	(Lithuania) Vytautas Lalas	(Lithuania) Vidas Blekaitis
2011	(Lithuania) Žydrūnas Savickas	(Lithuania) Vytautas Lalas	(Lithuania) Vidas Blekaitis
2012	(Lithuania) Žydrūnas Savickas	(Lithuania) Vytautas Lalas	(Lithuania) Saulius Brusokas
2013	(Lithuania) Žydrūnas Savickas	(Lithuania) Vidas Blekaitis	(Lithuania) Saulius Brusokas
2014	(Lithuania) Vidas Blekaitis	(Lithuania) Marius Lalas	(Lithuania) Marius Beniušis
2015	(Lithuania) Vidas Blekaitis	(Lithuania) Dalius Ziminskas	(Lithuania) Donaldas Andriulis
2016	(Lithuania) Vytautas Lalas	(Lithuania) Vidas Blekaitis	(Lithuania) Saulius Brusokas
2017	(Lithuania) Žydrūnas Savickas	(Lithuania) Vidas Blekaitis	(Lithuania) Karolis Aleksandravičius
2018	(Lithuania) Vytautas Lalas	(Lithuania) Dainius Repšys	(Lithuania) Martynas Brusokas
2019	(Lithuania) Marius Lalas	(Lithuania) Martynas Brusokas	(Lithuania) Mantas Lalas
2020	(Lithuania) Žydrūnas Savickas	(Lithuania) Dainius Repšys	(Lithuania) Karolis Aleksandravičius
2021	(Lithuania) Karolis Aleksandravičius	(Lithuania) Dainius Repšys	(Lithuania) Audrius Jokūbaitis
2022	(Lithuania) Žydrūnas Savickas	(Lithuania) Modestas Struckus	(Lithuania) Dainius Repšys
2023	(Lithuania) Karolis Aleksandravičius	(Lithuania) Tomas Šliupas	(Lithuania) Mantas Lalas
2024	(Lithuania) Audrius Jokūbaitis	(Lithuania) Tomas Šliupas	(Lithuania) Modestas Struckus
2025	(Lithuania) Tomas Šliupas	(Lithuania) Modestas Struckus	(Lithuania) Audrius Jokūbaitis
2026	(Lithuania) Tomas Šliupas	(Lithuania) Robertas Bartkevičius	(Lithuania) Saulius Skikas

=== Repeat champions ===
Six athletes won the competition multiple times.

Champion	Wins	Athlete still active
(Lithuania) Žydrūnas Savickas	17	No
(Soviet Union) (Lithuania) Raimundas Zenkevicius	4	No
(Lithuania) Stasys Mecius	2	No
(Lithuania) Vidas Blekaitis	2	No
(Lithuania) Vytautas Lalas	2	No
(Lithuania) Karolis Aleksandravičius	2	Yes
(Lithuania) Tomas Šliupas	2	Yes
