= 2019 Giants Live World Tour Finals =

Strongman competition in Manchester, England

Competition information
- Dates: 7 September 2019
- Venue: Manchester Arena
- Location: Manchester
- Country: United Kingdom
- Athletes participating: 13
- Nations participating: 9

Champion(s)
- (Poland) Mateusz Kieliszkowski

The 2019 Giants Live World Tour Finals was a strongman competition that took place in Manchester, England on 7 September 2019 at the Manchester Arena. This event was the finale of the 2019 Giants live tour.

== Participants ==
- Oleksii Novikov (Ukraine)
- Mark Felix (United Kingdom)
- Adam Bishop (United Kingdom)
- Tom Stoltman (United Kingdom)
- Ben Brunning (United Kingdom)
- Mikhail Shivlyakov (Russia)
- Kevin Faires (United States)
- Mateusz Kieliszkowski (Poland)
- Evan Singleton (United States)
- Cheick Sanou (Burkina Faso)
- Luke Stoltman (United Kingdom)
- Terry Hollands (United Kingdom)
- Robert Oberst (United States)

== Results of events ==
=== Event 1: Axle deadlift for repetitions ===
- Weight was 350 kilograms (770 lb).
- An axle deadlift bar is larger in diameter to a conventional bar.

#	Name	Nationality	Repetitions	Event Pts	Overall Pts
1	Oleksii Novikov	Ukraine	7	12	12
1	Mark Felix	United Kingdom	7	12	12
1	Adam Bishop	United Kingdom	7	12	12
4	Tom Stoltman	United Kingdom	6	10	10
5	Ben Brunning	United Kingdom	5	8.5	8.5
5	Mikhail Shivlyakov	Russia	5	8.5	8.5
7	Kevin Faires	United States	4	7	7
8	Mateusz Kieliszkowski	Poland	3	4.5	4.5
8	Evan Singleton	United States	3	4.5	4.5
8	Cheick Sanou	Burkina Faso	3	4.5	4.5
8	Luke Stoltman	United Kingdom	3	4.5	4.5
12	Terry Hollands	United Kingdom	1	2	2
13	Robert Oberst	United States	0	0	0

=== Event 2: Circus dumbbell for repetitions ===
- Weight of the dumbbell was 103 kilograms (227 lb).

#	Name	Nationality	Repetitions	Event Pts	Overall Pts
1	Mateusz Kieliszkowski	Poland	9	13	17.5
2	Oleksii Novikov	Ukraine	8	12	24
3	Evan Singleton	United States	7	10.5	15
3	Cheick Sanou	Burkina Faso	7	10.5	15
5	Luke Stoltman	United Kingdom	5	9	13.5
6	Ben Brunning	United Kingdom	4	7.5	16
6	Mikhail Shivlyakov	Russia	4	7.5	16
8	Adam Bishop	United Kingdom	3	5	17
8	Tom Stoltman	United Kingdom	3	5	15
8	Robert Oberst	United States	3	5	5
11	Mark Felix	United Kingdom	1	2	14
11	Kevin Faires	United States	1	2	9
11	Terry Hollands	United Kingdom	1	2	4

=== Event 3: Car Walk ===
- 450 kilograms (990 lb) car UKk over a 20 metres (66 ft) course.

#	Name	Nationality	Time	Event Pts	Overall Pts
1	Mateusz Kieliszkowski	Poland	0m 10.00 (Note: This time was a new world record breaking the previous held by Laurence Shahlaei.)	13	30.5
2	Cheick Sanou	Burkina Faso	0m 11.12	12	27
3	Evan Singleton	United States	0m 11.25	11	26
4	Robert Oberst	United States	0m 14.46	10	15
5	Adam Bishop	United Kingdom	0m 15.49	9	26
6	Ben Brunning	United Kingdom	0m 15.76	8	24
7	Oleksii Novikov	Ukraine	0m 16.49	7	31
8	Luke Stoltman	United Kingdom	0m 16.75	6	19.5
9	Mark Felix	United Kingdom	0m 16.88	5	19
10	Terry Hollands	United Kingdom	0m 16.95	4	8
11	Tom Stoltman	United Kingdom	0m 19.14	3	18
12	Kevin Faires	United States	0m 20.45	2	11
N/A	Mikhail Shivlyakov	Russia	DNS	1	17

=== Event 4: Hercules Hold ===
- Athlete must stand between and hold on to 160 kilograms (350 lb) pillars for as long as possible.

#	Name	Nationality	Time	Event Pts	Overall Pts
1	Mark Felix	United Kingdom	1m 27.52 (Note: This time was a new world record breaking the previous record held by Mark Felix himself.)	13	32
2	Robert Oberst	United States	1m 19.63	12	27
3	Ben Brunning	United Kingdom	1m 15.14	11	35
4	Cheick Sanou	Burkina Faso	1m 10.59	10	37
5	Evan Singleton	United States	1m 08.72	9	35
6	Kevin Faires	United States	1m 01.63	8	19
7	Terry Hollands	United Kingdom	0m 58.52	7	15
8	Oleksii Novikov	Ukraine	0m 55.56	6	37
9	Mateusz Kieliszkowski	Poland	0m 49.59	5	35.5
10	Adam Bishop	United Kingdom	0m 47.39	4	30
11	Mikhail Shivlyakov	Russia	0m 44.02	3	20
12	Luke Stoltman	United Kingdom	0m 43.69	2	21.5
13	Tom Stoltman	United Kingdom	0m 34.03	1	19

=== Event 5: Atlas Stones ===
- 5 Atlas stone series ranging from 120–200 kilograms (260–440 lb).

#	Name	Nationality	Time	Event Pts	Overall Pts
1	Tom Stoltman	United Kingdom	5 in 0m 20.88	13	32
2	Mateusz Kieliszkowski	Poland	5 in 0m 21.15	12	47.5
3	Mark Felix	United Kingdom	5 in 0m 26.53	11	43
4	Ben Brunning	United Kingdom	5 in 0m 26.79	10	45
5	Adam Bishop	United Kingdom	5 in 0m 29.14	9	39
6	Oleksii Novikov	Ukraine	5 in 0m 29.38	8	45
7	Kevin Faires	United States	5 in 0m 31.29	7	26
8	Luke Stoltman	United Kingdom	5 in 0m 32.72	6	27.5
9	Evan Singleton	United States	5 in 0m 34.50	5	40
10	Robert Oberst	United States	5 in 0m 48.15	4	31
11	Cheick Sanou	Burkina Faso	4 in 0m 32.16	3	40
12	Terry Hollands	United Kingdom	4 in 0m 43.46	2	17
N/A	Mikhail Shivlyakov	Russia	0	0	20

== Final results ==
#	Name	Nationality	Pts
1	Mateusz Kieliszkowski	Poland	47.5
2	Ben Brunning	United Kingdom	45
3	Oleksii Novikov	Ukraine	45
4	Mark Felix	United Kingdom	43
5	Evan Singleton	United States	40
5	Cheick Sanou	Burkina Faso	40
7	Adam Bishop	United Kingdom	39
8	Tom Stoltman	United Kingdom	32
9	Robert Oberst	United States	31
10	Luke Stoltman	United Kingdom	27.5
11	Kevin Faires	United States	26
12	Mikhail Shivlyakov	Russia	20
13	Terry Hollands	United Kingdom	17
