= Matt Wanat =

American strongman

- Born: September 16, 1975 (age 50); Wauwatosa, Wisconsin, United States
- Occupation: Strongman
- Height: 6 ft 4 in (1.93 m)
- Partner: Juli Peterson
- Children: Torrie, Callie, Chelsie
- Website: tosabarbell.com

Competition record

Strongman

Representing United States

IFSA Strongman World Championships
Qualified	2007	

America's Strongest Man
7th	2007	
10th	2009	

Strongman Champions League
8th	Strongman Champions League 2009: Finland	
4th	Strongman Champions League 2009: Holland	
6th	Strongman Champions League 2010: SCL Iceman Challenge	
5th	Strongman Champions League 2010: Slovakia	
9th	Strongman Champions League 2011: SCL Iceman Challenge	
8th	Strongman Champions League 2011: Serbia	
7th	Strongman Champions League 2011: South Africa	
10th	Strongman Champions League 2011: Holland	

World Strongman Challenge
6th	2006	

Utah's Strongest Man
Qualified	2006	

NE Wisconsin Strongman Challenge
3rd	2006	

WFS Team USA vs. Team Union
7th	2008	

Monster's of the Midwest III
2nd	2005	

Matt Wanat (born September 16, 1975) is a professional Strongman competitor from Wauwatosa, Wisconsin.

== Strongman ==
After playing football as a walk on at University of Iowa his freshman year, Matt concentrated on his Chemical Engineering degree. He began competing in Strongman in 2003 in New London Wisconsin taking second place to Sam McMahon at his first contest. He also competed at Amateur Nationals that year against other (now Pro's) Sam McMahon; Dave Ostlund; Travis Ortmeyer; and Van Hatfield. After competing twice, taking a 2nd and 1st in 2005 contests, Matt earned his Pro card in June 2005 at the Strongest Man on Grand contest in St. Paul, Minnesota. He took first in the Amateur class and third overall to Dave Ostlund and Jason Bergmann. He also competed that year at Utah's Strongest Man taking third to Travis Ortmeyer (1st) and Kevin Nee (2nd.)

In 2006, Matt competed in the World's Strongman Challenge taking 6th behind such Strongman as Zydrunas Savickas and Derek Poundstone.

In 2007, Matt competed at the Fresno Pro Qualifier to qualify for Nationals. He competed at America's Strongest Man in Charlotte, NC and placed 7th. Matt also competed at IFSA Worlds in Geumsan, South Korea. While in South Korea, Matt met the Strongman Champions League promoters Ilkka Kinnunen and Marcel Mostert.

Matt competed in the Ukraine and Team USA v. Team Union in Belarus in 2008.

Matt's Strongman career took off in 2009 at an American Strongman Live show in Anderson, S.C. He also competed in American Strongman Live in Tulsa, O.K. and competed in his first Strongman Champions League competition in Finland in May. He has gone on to compete with Champions League in such locations as Holland; Slovakia; Serbia; South Africa; and Gibraltar.

Matt currently trains at his home gym and sometimes trains events with others at Winner's Edge Sports Performance.

Matt's biggest influence in Strongman has come from Bill Kazmaier, Zydrunas Savickas and Karl Gillingham.

Matt's recent accomplishment is his 5th-place finish at the World Loglift Championships in Vilnius, Lithuania.

== Personal ==
Matt grew up in Wauwatosa, Wisconsin, a suburb of Milwaukee. The eldest of six children, he received support of his sisters Kari (Wanat-Sperry), Becky (Oiler), brother T.J., sisters Kitty (Berkovitz), and Alli. His parents, Tom (Iowa alumn and former offensive tackle for the Hawkeyes) and Jean (also Iowa alumn) have also been a constant influence in Matt's life. Matt has three step-daughters Tori, Callie, and Chelsie. He now resides in 'Tosa with his wife (Juli Peterson) and her son, Oscar along with their two Kuvasz, Preacher and Dazzle.
