= Larry Wheels =

American powerlifter (born 1994)

- Professional bodybuilder
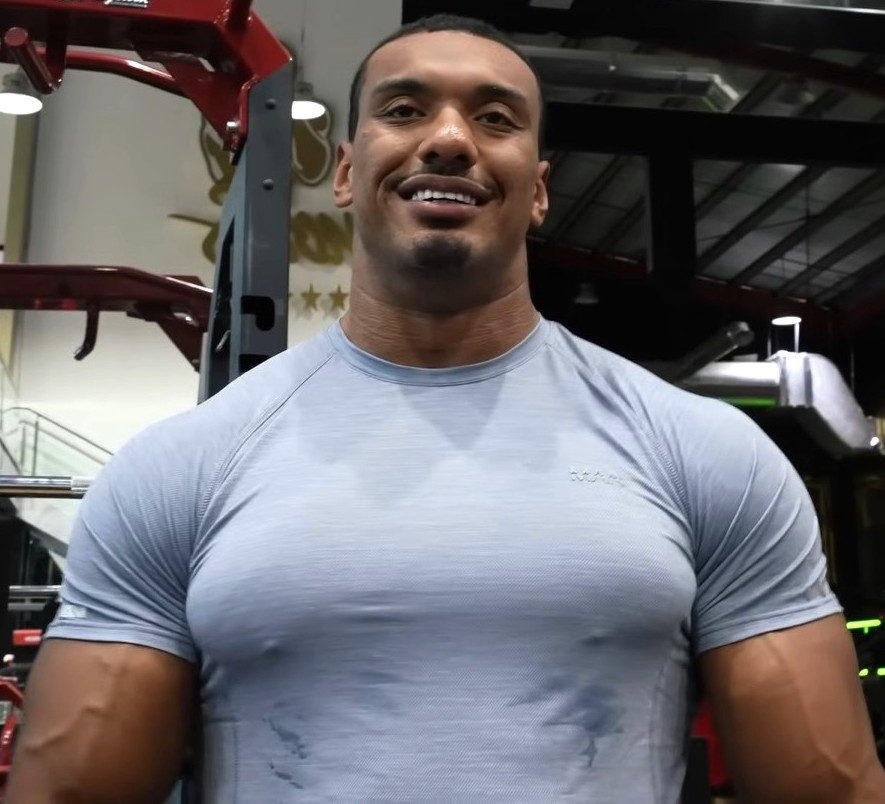
- Wheels in 2022

Personal info
- Born: Larry Williams; December 3, 1994 (age 31); The Bronx, New York City, U.S.

Best statistics
- Biceps: 20 in (51 cm)
- Forearm: 16 in (40 cm)
- Height: 6 ft 1 in (1.85 m)
- Weight: 280 lb (130 kg)

Instagram information
- Page: larrywheels
- Followers: 5.4 million

TikTok information
- Page: larrywheels
- Followers: 2.9 million

YouTube information
- Channel: LarryWheels
- Years active: 2013–present
- Subscribers: 3.3 million (May 20, 2025)
- Views: 1.1 billion (May 20, 2025)

Larry Williams (born December 3, 1994), better known as Larry Wheels, is a French Antillean-American powerlifter, fitness influencer and a professional bodybuilder competing in the IFBB Pro League. Born in Manhattan, New York City, Williams later moved to Saint Martin in 2008 as a teenager before returning to New York City and later moving to Los Angeles.

As a powerlifter, Williams achieved world records for the total (i.e., combined squat, bench, and deadlift) in three weight classes. A prolific competitor, Williams has also competed in other strength sports including bodybuilding, strongman, and arm wrestling, appearing at major professional and amateur competitions.

Williams has been open about his struggles with addiction to anabolic steroids throughout his career, attracting both respect and controversy. Early in his career, he was simply open about his use, including detailing his cycles and suppliers; later, he spoke out about his regrets and the difficulties he experienced as a result of excessive steroid use beginning as a teenager.

== Early life ==
Larry Williams was born in Manhattan and spent his early childhood in Bedford–Stuyvesant before moving with his mother to Yonkers. In 2000, the family relocated to The Bronx. Following family circumstances, Williams began living with his grandmother at age six.

At age twelve, Williams moved to Saint Martin to live with his mother again. Williams holds French nationality from his mother who’s from the French part of the island of Saint Martin. According to Muscle & Fitness, he did not receive a formal education while living on the island due to limited schooling options. He began strength training during this period, initially working out at home because local gyms had age restrictions.

Williams later returned to New York City, where he started training in a gym. He has said that he realized by age 17 that he was already the strongest person in his gym. He began competing in powerlifting at age eighteen.

== Powerlifting career ==
Williams entered his first powerlifting show at the age of 18, posting an 1,810 pound (821 kg) total. Williams set his first world record in the 242-pound weight class in 2017, posting a 2,171-pound total. Williams competed in the 275-pound weight class the following year and set another world record with a 2,275-pound total. Throughout his career, Williams has consistently competed in raw (i.e., without the use of a supportive suit for squat, bench, or deadlift) powerlifting divisions, initially in raw-with-wraps divisions but mainly in raw-with-sleeves divisions.

In Williams's final career competition in 2020, he posted a 2,370-pound total at a bodyweight of 283 pounds; this was the third-heaviest raw (in sleeves) total ever at the time, regardless of weight class, and broke the previous 308-pound-weight-class record by a tenth of a pound. Williams's 645-pound bench remains a record in the 308-pound weight class for a full competition.

Williams last competed in 2020 and has since made no plans to compete. He has, however, continued to discuss goals in strength training such as a 1,000-pound deadlift. In 2022, he announced his decision to quit using anabolic steroids, which would mean losing a significant amount of strength.

== Bodybuilding career ==
=== Amateur bodybuilding ===
Williams competed in his first bodybuilding show, the National Physique Committee Gold Coast Muscle Classic, in 2018. He took first place overall. At that year's NPC National Championships, Williams would place 11th.

In 2023, Williams competed in the Classic Physique division of the NPC Ultimate Warriors competition, placing first overall. After winning the competition Williams announced his plans to pursue an IFBB pro card by competing in that year's amateur Mr. Olympia competition. In the Amateur Olympia Williams also competed in the classic physique division. He would ultimately place second in his class, leaving him ineligible to compete for the overall title and the pro card.

In 2024, Williams announced that he was retiring from competitive bodybuilding due to relapsing on anabolic steroids. Citing concerns for his mental and physical health, he announced that he would no longer pursue a pro card and pulled out of a planned competition.

In 2025, shortly after initially announcing his retirement, Williams announced that he was returning to competitive bodybuilding. He won his pro card at the 2025 Musclecontest Ireland amateur competition.

=== Professional bodybuilding ===
After winning his pro card at the 2025 Musclecontest Ireland, he immediately entered the professional portion of the same competition, the IFBB Musclecontest Bullman Pro. Here he finished 10th out of 12 competitors.

=== Contest history ===
- 1st – NPC Gold Coast Muscle Classic, 2018, Bodybuilding, Heavyweight
- 11th – NPC National Championships, 2018, Bodybuilding, Super Heavyweight
- 1st – NPC Ultimate Warriors, 2023, Classic Physique, Overall Winner
- 2nd – NPC Amateur Olympia, 2023, Classic Physique
- 4th – NPC Musclecontest Ireland, 2025, Bodybuilding, Super Heavyweight
- 1st – NPC Musclecontest Ireland, 2025, Classic Physique, Overall Winner (earned the IFBB Pro Card)
- 10th – IFBB Musclecontest Bullman Pro, 2025, Classic Physique

== Strongman ==
Williams competed in strongman events at several points throughout his career. Williams began his strongman career in 2019, appearing at the Odd Haugen Classic, in a performance labeled "ferocious" despite missing the podium. Giants Live would invite him as a guest lifter to several shows that year: first, to The World Log Lift Championships, where he attempted to tie the American record of 214 kg set by Rob Kearney, ultimately falling short. He would record a 202.5 kg log lift at the event, leaving him tied for fifth. Notably, Williams competed at a much lighter weight than other competitors: while some strongmen weigh 400 or more pounds, Williams has consistently remained well under 300 for his career. Williams was also scheduled to appear at the 2019 World Deadlift Championships, but was forced to withdraw due to an injured bicep.

Williams later planned to appear at the 2022 Middle East's Strongest Man, intending to complete a 1,000-pound deadlift at the show. He was forced to withdraw due to injury. Williams has since made no statements on a return to competitive strongman.

== Steroid abuse ==
Williams began taking steroids as a teenager. Initially, he intended to use it to "replace" drugs and alcohol, "replac[ing] one vice with another." He experienced several severe side-effects, including "severe muscle cramps, depression, lethargy, loss of appetite, and low libido," saying that "[his] body decided to fight back" due to his overuse. He spoke openly about his fear of others imitating him in using steroids in his video "Steroids: The Raw Truth!"

Williams has tried to quit or cut down on his steroid use at several times in his career, seeking to use "the bare minimum" at several points while powerlifting. Williams later quit steroids and began testosterone replacement therapy as his body could no longer naturally produce testosterone. He first attempted to quit in 2022. Williams has dealt with several relapses since then, particularly during his preparation for bodybuilding shows, leading him to quit competitive bodybuilding as he sought to quit his steroid abuse altogether. Williams received criticism from some voices in the bodybuilding community, with competitor Víctor Martínez arguing that he was looking for sympathy while continuing to abuse steroids to gain a competitive edge.
