= Vytautas Lalas =

Lithuanian strongman

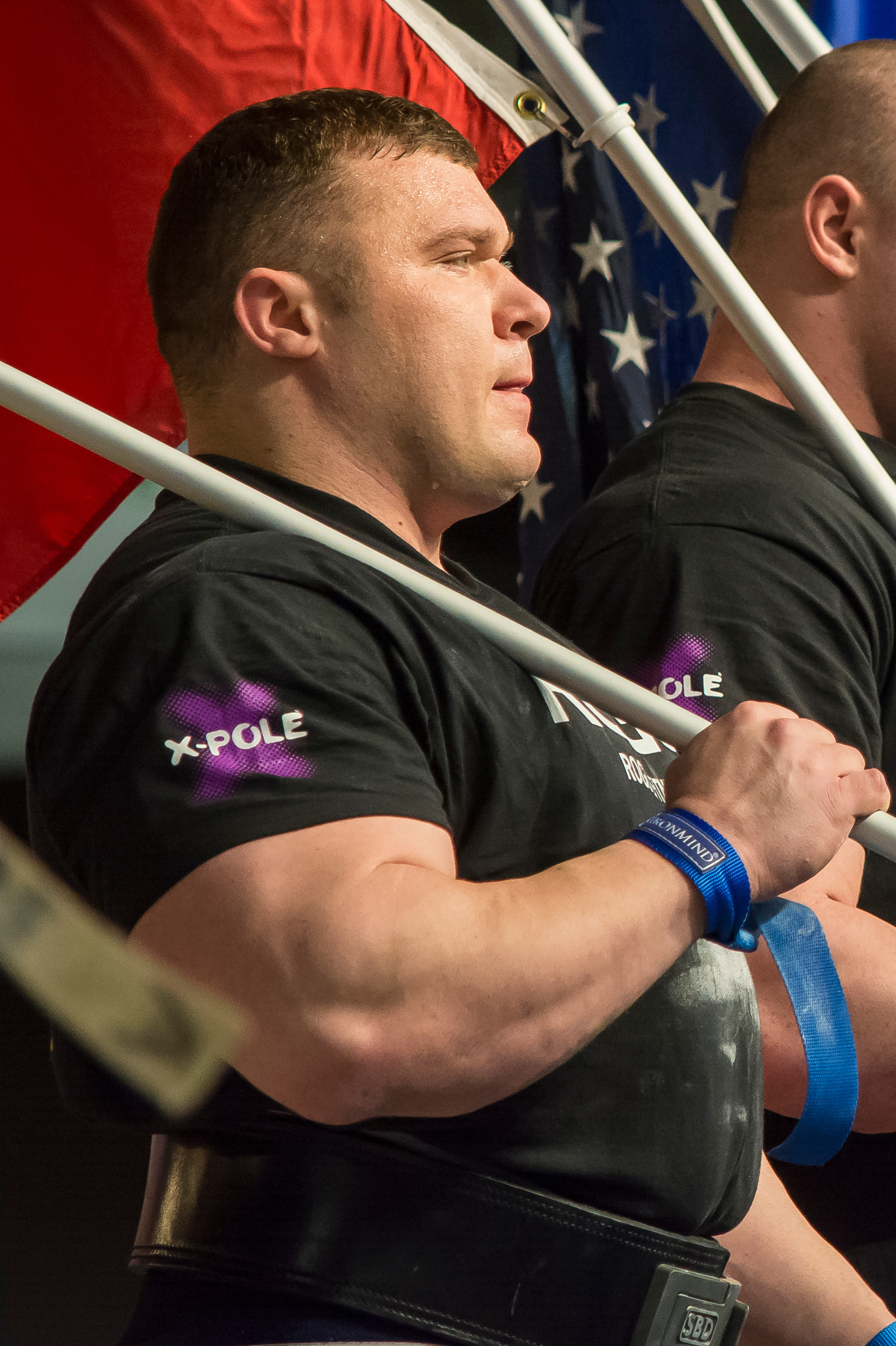
- Lalas at the 2017 Arnold Classic

Personal information
- Born: Mažeikiai, Lithuania
- Occupations: Strongman, arm wrestler
- Height: 1.78 m (5 ft 10 in)
- Weight: 145–148 kg (320–326 lb)

Sport
- Sport: Strongman
Medal record
Representing Lithuania
World's Strongest Man
Qualified	2010 World's Strongest Man
7th	2011 World's Strongest Man
2nd	2012 World's Strongest Man
6th	2013 World's Strongest Man
Arnold Strongman Classic
1st	2013 Arnold Strongman Classic
4th	2014 Arnold Strongman Classic
3rd	2016 Arnold Strongman Classic
6th	2017 Arnold Strongman Classic
Europe's Strongest Man
2nd	2012 Europe's Strongest Man
2nd	2013 Europe's Strongest Man
10th	2018 Europe's Strongest Man
Arnold Pro Strongman World Series
3rd	2013 Europe
1st	2016 Asia
3rd	2017 Forts de Warwick
Giants Live
1st	2010 Poland
3rd	2011 London
1st	2013 Poland
5th	2018 World Tour Finals
Strongman Champions League
1st	2011 SCL Finland
2nd	2011 SCL Bulgaria
3rd	2012 SCL Savickas Classic
1st	2013 SCL FIBO
2nd	2013 SCL Czech Republic
3rd	2013 SCL Portugal
1st	2017 SCL Overhead
7th	2107 SCL Truck Pull
Ultimate Strongman
1st	2017 Viking Apocalypse
4th	2018 Summermania
World Log Lift Championships
3rd	2011 WLLC
3rd	2012 WLLC
Lithuania's Strongest Man
5th	2007 Lithuania's Strongest Man
3rd	2009 Lithuania's Strongest Man
2nd	2010 Lithuania's Strongest Man
2nd	2011 Lithuania's Strongest Man
2nd	2012 Lithuania's Strongest Man
1st	2016 Lithuania's Strongest Man
1st	2018 Lithuania's Strongest Man
Lithuanian Junior Championships
1st	2005 LJC
Highland Games
Representing Lithuania
Highlander Challenge
8th	2011 Highlander Challenge

Vytautas Lalas (born 21 July 1982) is a Lithuanian professional strongman. He is most notable for being the winner of the 2013 Arnold Strongman Classic and the runner-up at the 2012 World's Strongest Man.

Several strength analysts and historians regard Lalas as the best athlete to have never won World's Strongest Man title.

== Strongman ==
=== 2007–2011 ===
Lalas started his career with Lithuania's Strongest Man competition in 2007 and emerged third by 2009. In his first international strongman competition, he won 2010 Giants Live Poland competition. This victory qualified Lalas for the 2010 World's Strongest Man competition in Sun City, South Africa, but he was unable to qualify for the finals, emerging third in his group.

Lalas placed third in the 2011 Giants Live London, qualifying for the 2011 World's Strongest Man competition later that year in Wingate, North Carolina. He made the finals for the first time and finished in 6th place. He alspo won 2011 Strongman Champions League Finland, and placed second at the 2011 SCL Bulgaria.

=== 2012 ===
Lalas won second place at the 2012 Europe's Strongest Man competition which qualified him for the 2012 World's Strongest Man later in the year where he eventually emerged runner-up to fellow Lithuanian Žydrūnas Savickas. He was leading the competition coming in to the final event power stairs, where his relatively short stature cost him the title. However, he set a new world record in the giant barbell squat event in the qualifying heats by squatting 317.5 kg (700 lb) for 11 repetitions. He also placed second in 2012 Lithuania's Strongest Man and third at the inaugural 2012 SCL Savickas Classic and third at the 2012 World Log Lift Championships in Vilnius.

=== 2013 ===
In 2013, Lalas accomplished the pinnacle victory of his career by winning the 2013 Arnold Strongman Classic in Columbus, Ohio which is widely considered the heaviest and most difficult strongman competition in the world. He pressed the 202 kg (445 lb) Austrian Oak, loaded a 244 kg (538 lb) Manhood Stone, pulled 507 kg (1,118 lb) on the elevated Hummer tyre deadlift, pressed a 120 kg (265 lb) giant circus dumbbell for 5 repetitions and became the sixth man to win the prestigious title. Lalas also won the 2013 SCL FIBO in Cologne, Germany, 2013 Giants Live Poland, and emerged runner-up in 2013 SCL Czech Republic and 2013 Europe's Strongest Man competitions. He also was third place in 2013 SCL Portugal. At 2013 World's Strongest Man, he placed sixth.

=== 2014–2016 ===
Owing to the 640 kg (1,411 lb) bale tote (yoke) event of the 2014 Arnold Strongman Classic, Lalas suffered a back injury and dropped to fourth place and owing to the same injury dropped to ninth place at 2014 Europe's Strongest Man. In his return after a hiatus due to recovery in 2015, he emerged third in the 2016 Arnold Strongman Classic and won 2016 Arnold Asia and 2016 Lithuania's Strongest Man competitions, but his back injuries started to resurface.

=== 2017–2018 ===
Starting his 2017, he won 2017 SCL World Overhead Lift Championships, 2017 Ultimate Strongman - Viking Apocalypse, and emerged third at 2017 Festival des Hommes Forts de Warwick while sharing the world record in the Cyr junior dumbell press with Hafþór Júlíus Björnsson and Matjaž Belšak. The back injuries unfortunately persisted but he managed to win 2018 Lithuania's Strongest Man becoming a two time champion and placed fifth at 2018 Giants Live World Tour Finals. 2018 Burn Showdown (Battle of the North) was his final competition.

== Personal records ==
- Elephant bar Deadlift (Raw with straps) – 420 kg (926 lb) (2017 Arnold Strongman Classic)
- Deadlift (for reps) – 370 kg (816 lb) for 3 reps
- Hummer tyre deadlift (15 in off the floor) – 507 kg (1,118 lb) (2013 Arnold Strongman Classic)
- Squat – 380 kg (838 lb) for 2 reps (Raw)
- Squat – 320 kg (705 lb) for 11 reps (former world record)
- Log press – 205 kg (452 lb) (2012 Europe's Strongest Man)
- Log press/ Austrian Oak (for reps) – 200 kg (441 lb) for 2 reps (2014 Arnold Strongman Classic)
- Axle press – 195 kg (430 lb)
- Cyr dumbbell – 124 kg (273 lb) for 5 reps (2016 Arnold Strongman Classic)
- Cyr (Junior) dumbbell – 102 kg (225 lb) for 9 reps (2017 Festival des Hommes Forts de Warwick) (joint world record)
- Manhood Stone (Max Atlas Stone) – 244 kg (538 lb) over 4 ft bar (2013 Arnold Strongman Classic)
- Bale tote/ Super yoke – 700 kg (1,543 lb) for 4m in 24.22 seconds (2016 Arnold Strongman Classic)
- Farmer's walk (no straps) – 160 kg (353 lb) per each hand for 30m course in 10.67 seconds (2012 Arnold Europe) (World Record)
- Medley – 150 kg (331 lb) per hand farmers walk for 15m course into 250 kg (551 lb) sled drag for 15m course in 29.41 seconds (2013 Giants Live Poland) (World Record)

== Personal life ==
Lalas has two brothers who also compete in strongman. Marius, who won Lithuania's Strongest Man in 2019, and Mantas, who placed 3rd in the same contest.

Vytautas has a wife named Simone, and is based in Dublin, Ireland, where he runs a gym.

== Competitive record ==
Winning percentage: 26.66%
Podium percentage: 60.00%

	1st	2nd	3rd	Podium	4th	5th	6th	7th	8th	9th	10th	Total
International competitions	8	5	5	18	2	1	2	3	1	0	1	30

== Filmography ==
=== Television ===
Year	Title	Role	Notes
2010–2013	World's Strongest Man	Himself – Competitor	
