= Vidas Blekaitis =

Lithuanian strongman (born 1972)

Personal information
- Born: 14 April 1972 (age 54) Birštonas, Lithuanian SSR, Soviet Union
- Occupation: Strongman
- Height: 5 ft 11 in (1.80 m)
Medal record
Strongman
Representing Lithuania
World's Strongest Man
| Qualified | 2003 World's Strongest Man |
| Qualified | 2011 World's Strongest Man |
Arnold Strongman Classic
| 4th | 2009 Arnold Strongman Classic |
Giants Live
| 2nd | 2011 Finland |
IFSA Strongman World Championship
| 7th | 2005 |
| 4th | 2006 |
| 6th | 2007 |
Lithuania's Strongest Man
| 2nd | 2000 |
| 2nd | 2002 |
| 3rd | 2003 |
| 3rd | 2004 |
| 2nd | 2005 |
| 2nd | 2006 |
| 2nd | 2007 |
| 2nd | 2008 |
| 2nd | 2009 |
| 3rd | 2010 |
| 3rd | 2011 |
| 4th | 2012 |
| 2nd | 2013 |
| 1st | 2014 |
| 1st | 2015 |
| 2nd | 2016 |
| 2nd | 2017 |
| 5th | 2019 |
Europe's Strongest Man(IFSA)
| 3rd | 2007 |
IFSA
| 2nd | 2006 Lithuania Grand Prix |
| 3rd | 2007 Latvia Grand Prix |
Strongman Champions League
| 2nd | 2008 Lithuania |
| 2nd | 2009 Finland |
| 4th | 2010 Finland |
World Log Lift Championships
| 3rd | 2009 |
| 2nd | 2011 |
Ultimate Strongman MastersWorld Championship
| 3rd | 2017 |
| 4th | 2018 |

Vidas Blekaitis (born 14 April 1972) is a Lithunanian strongman. As of 2007, Blekaitis was ranked World No. 4 by the International Federation of Strength Athletes. He placed 4th in the 2009 Arnold Strongman Classic. Blekaitis competed in the IFSA Strongman World Championships 3 times, finishing 7th in 2005, 4th in the 2006, and 6th in 2007.

Vidas Blekaitis placed second at the Giants Live Finland event on 13 August 2011. This placing qualified him for the 2011 World's Strongest Man contest, but he failed to make it to the finals.

== Personal records ==
- Super Yoke – 410 kg (904 lb) for 30 m (98 ft) in 11.34 secs (2007 IFSA Strongman World Championships) (joint-world record)
- Kettlebell press for reps (one arm) – 80 kg (176 lb) x 9 reps (2008 Globe's Strongest Man) (joint-world record)

== Reality shows ==
In 2009 Blekaitis was one of the contestants in Lithuanian television show „Šok su manimi“ ("Dance with me") and was eliminated without reaching the final

In 2014 Blekaitis was one of the contestants in Lithuanian version of reality show Celebrity Splash! called Šuolis!.
