= Žydrūnas Savickas =

Lithuanian strongman (born 1975)

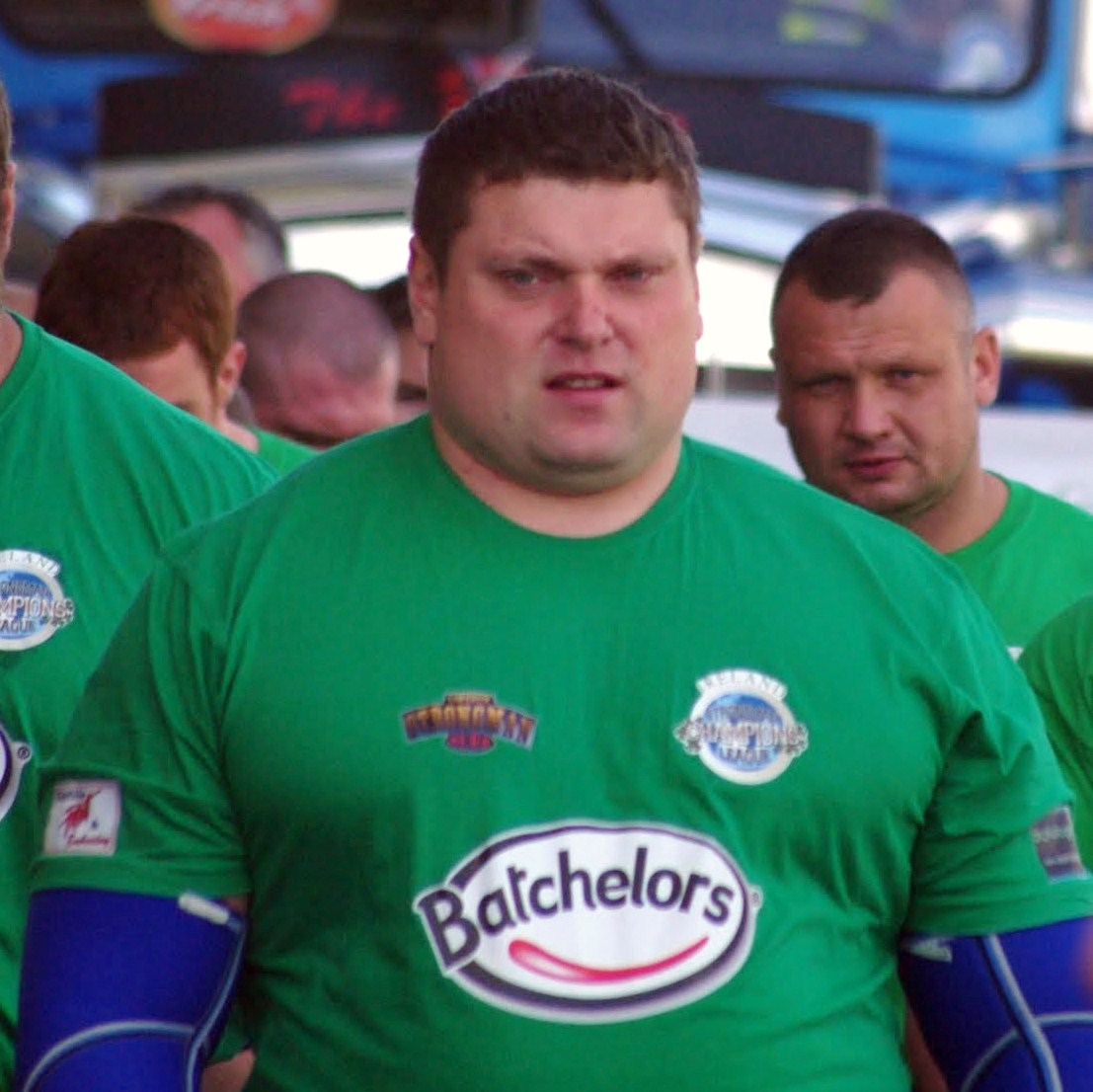
- Savickas in June 2010

Personal information
- Nickname: Big Z
- Born: July 15, 1975 (age 50) Biržai, Lithuanian SSR, Soviet Union
- Occupation(s): Strongman, powerlifter
- Height: 191 cm (6 ft 3 in)
- Weight: 140 kg (309 lb) – 187 kg (412 lb)
- Spouses: Jurgita Savickienė (m. 2010; div. 2021) Brigita Lacytė (m. 2022)
- Website: Official website
Medal record
Strongman
Representing Lithuania
World's Strongest Man
Qualified	1998 World's Strongest Man
Qualified	2000 World's Strongest Man
2nd	2002 World's Strongest Man
2nd	2003 World's Strongest Man
2nd	2004 World's Strongest Man
1st	2009 World's Strongest Man
1st	2010 World's Strongest Man
2nd	2011 World's Strongest Man
1st	2012 World's Strongest Man
2nd	2013 World's Strongest Man
1st	2014 World's Strongest Man
2nd	2015 World's Strongest Man
9th	2017 World's Strongest Man
10th	2018 World's Strongest Man
Arnold Strongman Classic
1st	2003 Arnold Strongman Classic
1st	2004 Arnold Strongman Classic
1st	2005 Arnold Strongman Classic
1st	2006 Arnold Strongman Classic
1st	2007 Arnold Strongman Classic
1st	2008 Arnold Strongman Classic
2nd	2010 Arnold Strongman Classic
3rd	2011 Arnold Strongman Classic
3rd	2012 Arnold Strongman Classic
1st	2014 Arnold Strongman Classic
2nd	2015 Arnold Strongman Classic
1st	2016 Arnold Strongman Classic
IFSA Strongman World Championships
1st	2005 IFSA SWC
1st	2006 IFSA SWC
3rd	2007 IFSA SWC
Arnold Pro Strongman World Series
1st	2012 Europe
3rd	2015 Europe
2nd	2016 Europe
2nd	2016 Asia
3rd	2016 Australia
IFSA Grand Prix
5th	1996 Lithuania Grand Prix
5th	2001 Atlantic Giant
1st	2005 Hungary Grand Prix
1st	2006 Dubai Grand Prix
1st	2006 Holland Grand Prix
1st	2006 Latvia Grand Prix
1st	2006 Lithuania Grand Prix
1st	2007 Lithuania Grand Prix
Europe's Strongest Man
3rd	2001 Europe's Strongest Man
7th	2002 Europe's Strongest Man
4th	2003 Europe's Strongest Man
3rd	2004 Europe's Strongest Man
1st	2010 Europe's Strongest Man
1st	2012 Europe's Strongest Man
1st	2013 Europe's Strongest Man
4th	2018 Europe's Strongest Man
World's Ultimate Strongman
10th	2018 World's Ultimate Strongman
Shaw Classic
12th	2021 Shaw Classic
10th	2022 Shaw Classic
World Muscle Power Championships
5th	2003 WMPC
3rd	2004 WMPC
Fortissimus
2nd	2008 Fortissimus
1st	2009 Fortissimus
Strongman Champions League
1st	2008 Latvia
1st	2008 Serbia
1st	2008 Holland
2nd	2008 Bulgaria
1st	2008 Lithuania
1st	2008 Romania
2nd	2008 Finland
1st	2008 Overall
1st	2009 England
1st	2009 Hungary
1st	2009 Ukraine SCL Finals
3rd	2009 Overall
1st	2010 SCL Iceman Challenge
1st	2010 Ireland
7th	2010 Overall
1st	2011 SCL Iceman Challenge II
1st	2011 Germany FIBO
1st	2011 Canada
1st	2011 Latvia
1st	2012 Sarajevo SCL Finals
2nd	2011 Overall
1st	2012 SCL Iceman Challenge III
1st	2012 Germany FIBO
1st	2012 Holland
1st	2012 China
1st	2012 Portugal
1st	2012 Finland
1st	2012 Poland
1st	2012 Gibraltar
1st	2012 Spain
1st	2012 Lithuania SCL Savickas Classic
1st	2012 Martinique SCL Finals
1st	2012 Overall
1st	2013 Holland
1st	2013 China
1st	2013 Russia
2nd	2013 Poland
1st	2013 Gibraltar
1st	2013 Lithuania SCL Savickas Classic
1st	2013 Brazil SCL Semi-finals
1st	2013 Malaysia SCL Finals
2nd	2013 Overall
1st	2014 Germany FIBO
16th	2014 Overall
2nd	2015 Netherlands
2nd	2015 Finland
12th	2015 Overall
Giants Live
1st	2010 Turkey
1st	2014 Poland
1st	2017 World Tour Finals
3rd	2017 Scandinavian Open
11th	2018 World Tour Finals
Strongman Super Series
3rd	2002 Sweden
2nd	2002 Hawaii
3rd	2002 Overall
3rd	2003 Hawaii
2nd	2003 Holland
2nd	2003 Overall
2nd	2004 Moscow
2nd	2004 Sweden
1st	2004 Overall
World Strongman Challenge
2nd	2002 World Strongman Challenge
3rd	2003 World Strongman Challenge
1st	2007 World Strongman Challenge
Força Bruta
1st	2014
3rd	2015
Globe's Strongest Man
1st	2010
4th	2011
Ultimate Strongman World Championship
7th	2016 Summermania
3rd	2017 Summermania
Battle of the North
4th	2015
4th	2016
1st	2017 Burn Showdown
World Strongman Cup
1st	2020
IFSA Strongman European Championships
1st	2005 IFSA Europe's
IFSA World Team Championships
1st	2005 Team Europe
1st	2007 Team Lithuania
Lithuania's Strongest Man
3rd	1996 Lithuania's Strongest Man
2nd	1997 Lithuania's Strongest Man
1st	1998 Lithuania's Strongest Man
1st	1999 Lithuania's Strongest Man
1st	2000 Lithuania's Strongest Man
2nd	2001 Lithuania's Strongest Man
1st	2002 Lithuania's Strongest Man
1st	2004 Lithuania's Strongest Man
1st	2005 Lithuania's Strongest Man
1st	2006 Lithuania's Strongest Man
1st	2007 Lithuania's Strongest Man
1st	2008 Lithuania's Strongest Man
1st	2009 Lithuania's Strongest Man
1st	2012 Lithuania's Strongest Man
1st	2013 Lithuania's Strongest Man
1st	2014 Lithuania's Strongest Man
1st	2015 Lithuania's Strongest Man
1st	2017 Lithuania's Strongest Man
1st	2020 Lithuania's Strongest Man
1st	2022 Lithuania's Strongest Man
Ultimate Strongman Masters
1st	2017 Masters
1st	2018 Masters
Official Strongman Games
1st	2017 Masters WSM
1st	2021 Masters WSM
1st	2022 Masters WSM
Static Monsters
1st	2020 Senior Male Static Monsters

Žydrūnas Savickas
Medal record
Representing Lithuania
Powerlifting
IPF World Powerlifting Championships
6th	1998 IPF World's	+125kg
5th	1999 IPF World's	+125kg
2nd	2000 IPF World's	+125kg
EPF European Powerlifting Championships
2nd	1998 EPF Europe's	+125kg
2nd	1999 EPF Europe's	+125kg
2nd	2000 EPF Europe's	+125kg
2nd	2001 EPF Europe's	+125kg
Lithuanian National Powerlifting Championships
1st	1995 National's	+125kg
1st	1996 National's	+125kg
1st	1997 National's	+125kg
1st	1999 National's	+125kg
1st	2000 National's	+125kg
1st	2001 National's	+125kg
1st	2002 National's	+125kg
1st	2003 National's	+125kg
1st	2004 National's	+125kg
1st	2005 National's	+125kg
IPF Junior World Championships
3rd	1997 IPF Junior's	+125kg

Žydrūnas Savickas (Lithuanian pronunciation: [ʑiːˈdrûːnɐs sɐˈvʲɪtskɐs]; born July 15, 1975) is a Lithuanian former professional strongman and powerlifter. Throughout a career which spanned nearly three decades, he competed in and won 79 international competitions, 5 international masters competitions and 36 national competitions. This included four World's Strongest Man titles, two IFSA Strongman World Championship's, six IFSA Grand Prix wins, three Europe's Strongest Man titles, a Fortissimus title, six Giants Live wins, seventeen Lithuania's Strongest Man titles, a record thirty four Strongman Champions League wins and a record eight Arnold Strongman Classic titles.

Savickas is the most decorated strongman in history. With 75 world records across multiple strongman events, particularly in overhead pressing including a sixteen-year reign as log lift world record holder and seven World Log Lift Championship titles, Savickas is widely regarded as the greatest strongman of all time.

== Career ==
Savickas became interested in strength sports after watching a Lithuanian regional strongman contest on TV in 1989. Three years later, aged 17, he took part in that same contest in 1992 and defeated several older and more experienced competitors, which prompted him to train powerlifting.

=== 1995–1997 ===
After 3 years of training equipped powerlifting, Savickas participated in 1995 Lithuanian national powerlifting championships in the +125 kg weight class and won. In 1996 Lithuanian national powerlifting championships he broke Lithuanian junior national records in squat, bench press, deadlift and total.

At 1997 IPF World Juniors Powerlifting Championships, Savickas totaled 865 kg (1,907 lb) in single ply equipment with a 320 kg (705 lb) squat, 215 kg (474 lb) bench press and a 330 kg (728 lb) deadlift.

=== 1998–2000 ===
In 1998, Savickas won his first Lithuania's Strongest Man contest. He would later go on to win this contest a total of 17 times, with the latest coming in 2022. Savickas then competed at the 1998 and 2000 World's Strongest Man contests but failed to qualify for the finals on both occasions.

Savickas won the silver medal in the 2000 IPF World powerlifting championships in Japan under the super heavyweight category with a total of 1,020 kg (2,250 lb) in single ply equipment, just 2.5 kg (5.5 lb) behind Brad Gillingham. Savickas squatted 410 kg (904 lb), bench pressed 250 kg (551 lb) and deadlifted 360 kg (794 lb) at a bodyweight of 154 kg (340 lb).

=== 2001–2002 ===
In 2001, a contest in the Faroe Islands dealt Savickas a major setback, as he tore both patellar tendons during the Conan's Wheel event. Many believed that the extent of the injury meant that his career was over. However, nine months later, Savickas won the Lithuanian powerlifting championships and a short time later, he also won the 2002 Lithuania's Strongest Man contest. Savickas would go on to finish in 2nd place at the 2002 World's Strongest Man in Kuala Lumpur, Malaysia. He would finish in 2nd place five more times in 2003, 2004, 2011, 2013 and 2015 and 1st place at the 2009, 2010, 2012 and 2014 World's Strongest Man contests.

=== 2003–2004 ===
Savickas won the Arnold Strongman Classic six consecutive times starting from 2003 until 2008. In 2003 he also placed second at 2003 Strongman Super Series Holland Grand Prix.

In 2004 he came third to Hugo Girard and Vasyl Virastyuk at the 2004 World Muscle Power Classic and won 2004 CEKOL Cup presented by IFSA.

In 2004 Lithuanian national powerlifting championships, Savickas totaled 1,090.5 kg (2,404 lb) in single ply equipment with a squat of 425 kg (937 lb), a bench press of 265.5 kg (585 lb) and a deadlift of 400 kg (882 lb).

=== 2005–2006 ===
Savickas won the IFSA European Championships in 2005 which qualified him for the IFSA World Championships. In September 2005, he broke three world records and won the IFSA Strongman World Championships in Quebec, Canada. In December 2005, Savickas won the IFSA World Team Championships with Team Europe.

On October 24, 2005, Savickas represented Lithuania in a team competition with Vidas Blekaitis, Saulius Brusokas, and Vilius Petrauskas. Team Lithuania placed 5th overall at the IFSA World's Strongest Nation contest in Ukraine.

In 2005 Lithuanian national powerlifting championships, Savickas squatted a career best 425.5 kg (938 lb) in single ply equipment.

In 2006 he won IFSA Dubai Grand Prix, IFSA World St.rongman Challenge, IFSA Holland Grand Prix, IFSA Latvia World Cup, United Strongman Series Lithuania and the IFSA World Championships for the 2nd time in 2006 in Reykjavík, Iceland.

=== 2007–2008 ===
In September 2007, Savickas finished in 3rd place at the last ever IFSA World Championships behind runner-up Mikhail Koklyaev and champion Vasyl Virastyuk in Geumsan, South Korea.

Savickas won 5 out of the 7 total contests during the inaugural 2008 Strongman Champions League season and won the 2008 overall title 58 points ahead of second-place finisher Ervin Katona.

=== 2009–2010 ===
In June 2009, Savickas won Fortissimus after finishing runner-up in 2008 behind Derek Poundstone. On October 3, 2009, Savickas won the 2009 World's Strongest Man competition ahead of defending champion and five-time winner Mariusz Pudzianowski. He had not competed at WSM since 2004.

On the set of Lo Show dei Record in Rome, Italy on April 1, 2010, Savickas set a record of 70 meters (229 ft 7 in) for the longest distance carrying a 300 kg yoke. The record was part of the Italian TV series Lo Show dei Record. In June 2010, Savickas won the Europe's Strongest Man competition.

In September 2010, Savickas and Brian Shaw tied for points at the 2010 World's Strongest Man competition, but Savickas won the championship on countback. He also set a new world record for the Giant Wooden Log Lift by lifting 210 kg (460 lb).

Savickas also won the World Log Lift Championships in 2008, 2009, and 2011 (no contest was held in 2010).

=== 2011 ===
In April 2011, Savickas set a new Guinness World Record by performing a 20-meter Farmer's Walk in 7.55 seconds with 150 kg (330 lb) implements in each hand. The event was broadcast on the Guinness TV show in Europe.

Savickas won five Strongman Champions League events during the 2011/2012 season, in Finland in March 2011, Germany on April 16, 2011, the SCL Semi-finals in Canada in October 2011, Latvia in November 2011 and the SCL Finals in Sarajevo, Bosnia on February 7, 2012. Ervin Katona won the overall championships, with Savickas as the runner-up. During the SCL Finals in Sarajevo, Savickas set a new world record in the Log Lift with 215 kg (474 lb). This was his 7th consecutive world record in the Log Lift, not including his world record in the Giant Wooden Log Lift set at the 2010 World's Strongest Man contest.

In September 2011, Savickas lost his WSM crown to Brian Shaw at the 2011 World's Strongest Man contest at Wingate University, North Carolina, coming in second place for the fourth time.

=== 2012 ===
Savickas won the 2012 Europe's Strongest Man contest on June 23, 2012, his second ESM title after winning in 2010. Savickas also set a new world record in the Log Lift with a lift of 216 kg (476 lb). This was his 8th consecutive Log Lift world record.

Savickas won 11 of the 14 Strongman Champions League contests in the 2012 season and won the overall championships title. During the SCL Holland event, Savickas set another world record in the Log Lift with a lift of 217.5 kg (480 lb). This was Savickas' third Log Lift world record in 2012 and 9th consecutive Log Lift world record.

On October 1, 2012, Savickas regained the WSM crown by winning the 2012 World's Strongest Man contest in Los Angeles, California. This was Savickas' third WSM title, and became the fifth competitor in WSM history to win three or more WSM titles. Savickas also set a new Log Lift world record in the finals with a lift of 220 kg (484 lb).

On October 7, 2012, Savickas won the 2012 World Log Lift Championships which was held at the same venue as the SCL Savickas Classic event. This was his fourth consecutive World Log Lift Championships title.

=== 2013 ===
Savickas won his inaugural 2013 contest, the Strongman Champions League Holland event held in Kalkar, Germany on June 22, 2013. Savickas also attempted a new Log Lift world record of 221 kg (487 lb), but failed to lockout the weight overhead. Savickas won seven SCL contests in the 2013 season and came second in the overall championships behind Krzysztof Radzikowski.

On June 29, 2013, Savickas won his third Europe's Strongest Man title. He also set a new Log Lift world record with a lift of 221 kg (487 lb).

In August 2013, Savickas finished second in the 2013 World's Strongest Man contest behind Brian Shaw.

=== 2014 ===
At the 2014 Força Bruta contest, held in Rio de Janeiro, Brazil, Savickas set a new world record in the Log Lift with 223 kg (492 lb), along with a record in the deadlift event, with 360 kg (790 lb) for 10 repetitions.

The following month, at the Giants Live Poland contest held in Dolina Charlotty, Savickas again set a new world record in the Log Lift, becoming the first human to lift 227 kg (500 lb).

At the 2014 World's Strongest Man, he managed to win his fourth title with just half a point difference over the second-placed Hafthór Júlíus Björnsson and in so doing became the oldest WSM winner in history, at 38 years and 258 days. Zydrunas also set a world record in the giant barbell squat event by squatting 329 kg (725 lb) for 15 repetitions.

Savickas also won the 2014 Arnold Strongman Classic, for the 7th time, defeating his long-time rival Brian Shaw. In addition to his victory, Savickas set new records in both the Austrian Oak, pressing 200 kg (440 lb) for four repetitions and in the Hummer Tire Deadlift event with a lift of 1,155 lb (524 kg).

=== 2015 ===
Savickas secured second place behind Brian Shaw at the 2015 Arnold Strongman Classic, despite being hindered by back and hamstring injuries. He again set a world record in the Austrian Oak event, lifting 205 kg (452 lb) for four repetitions. However, during the Bale Tote event, he sustained nerve damage to his neck; an injury that would trouble him for years following.

Later that year, at the 2015 World's Strongest Man competition, Savickas again finished as the runner-up to Shaw, once more competing through back and hamstring injuries. He claimed victory at the 2015 World Log Lift Championship.

At 2015 Força Bruta competition held in Rio de Janeiro, Savickas broke the log press world record with 228 kg (503 lb).

=== 2016 ===
Savickas again won the 2016 Arnold Strongman Classic, a record 8th time. He then emerged runner-up to Hafþór Júlíus Björnsson at the 2016 Arnold Australia and 2016 Arnold South America.

Savickas dropped from 2016 World's Strongest Man competition because of lingering back, neck, and hamstring injuries.

=== 2017 ===
In 2017, Savickas returned to the World's Strongest Man. While he made the finals, he was hampered by past injuries and finished in 9th place. This was the first time he placed lower than 2nd at WSM since the year 2000.

He also won 2017 Giants Live World Tour Finals and 2017 Burn Showdown.

=== 2018 ===
Savickas placed 4th in the 2018 Europe's Strongest Man, and 10th in the 2018, and his last World's Strongest Man finals. Savickas had to withdraw after the overhead press due to injuries to his biceps and Achilles.

In October, Savickas competed in the inaugural World's Ultimate Strongman which contained one of the most stacked lineups of all-time and ended up in tenth place out of twelve.

=== 2019–2022 ===
After winning 2020 Lithuania's Strongest Man and Pasaulio Taurė, he emerged twelfth at the 2021 Shaw Classic. After placing tenth at 2022 Shaw Classic and eleventh at 2022 Arnold UK, Savickas retired from open competitions and switched to masters divisions.

== Personal records ==
=== Powerlifting ===
Done in official powerlifting competitions under IPF rules (single-ply equipment).

- Squat – 425.5 kg (938 lb) (2005 Lithuanian National Championships) (Lithuanian record)
- Bench press – 265.5 kg (585 lb) (2004 Lithuanian National Championships) (Lithuanian record)
- Deadlift – 400 kg (882 lb) (2004 Lithuanian National Championships) (Lithuanian record)
- Total – 1,090.5 kg (2,404 lb) (425|265.5|400) (2004 Lithuanian National Championships) (Lithuanian record)

=== Strongman ===
- Log press – 228 kg (503 lb) (2015 Arnold Classic Brazil) (former world record)

→ Savickas has broken this world record a total of 16 times ever since he did it first with 188 kg (414 lb) in 2004.
This includes 14 times with the standard log and once each with the WSM giant log at 210 kg (460 lb) and SCL giant log at 205 kg (452 lb).

- Log press/ Austrian Oak (for reps) – 205 kg (452 lb) for 4 reps (2015 & 2016 Arnold Strongman Classic's) (World Record)
- Apollon's Axle press – 215 kg (474 lb) (2010 Giants Live Istanbul) (former world record)

→ Savickas has set this world record 6 times; achieving it 4 times individually and sharing the record twice.

- Apollon's Axle press (for reps) – 208 kg (459 lb) × 2 reps (2010 Arnold Strongman Classic) (World Record)
- Apollon's Axle press (for reps) – 188 kg (414 lb) × 5 reps (2011 Arnold Strongman Classic) (World Record)
- Apollon's Wheels press (for reps) – 166 kg (366 lb) × 8 continental cleans and presses (2006 Arnold Strongman Classic) (joint-world record)

→ Savickas has broken this world record a total of 4 times ever since he did it first with 4 reps in 2003

- Metal Block press – 150 kg (330 lb) (2011 World's Strongest Man – group 4) (former joint-world record)
- Cyr Dumbbell press – 136 kg (300 lb) (2016 Arnold Strongman Classic)
- Cyr Dumbbell press (for reps) – 124 kg (273 lb) x 4 reps [has achieved this feat twice] (2014 and 2015 Arnold Strongman Classics)
- Giant Barbell Squat (for reps) – 329 kg (725 lb) × 15 reps (single-ply suit w/ wraps) (2014 World's Strongest Man) (World Record)
- Deadlift (stiff bar, raw with straps) – 433 kg (955 lb) (2012 Europe's Strongest Man)
- Deadlift for reps (deadlift bar, with briefs and straps) – 400 kg (880 lb) x 2 reps (2017 World Deadlift Championships)
- IronMind s-cubed bar Deadlift (at 1-inch deficit, raw with straps) – 440 kg (970 lb) (2011 World's Strongest Man) (former strongman record)
- Rogue Elephant bar Deadlift (raw with straps) – 404 kg (891 lb) (2016 Arnold Strongman Classic)
- Giant Barbell Deadlift (for reps) – 320 kg (705 lb) × 10 (2006 IFSA World Championships) (former joint-world record)
- Hummer Tire Deadlift (15 inches from the floor) – 524 kg (1,155 lb) (2014 Arnold Strongman Classic) (former world record)
- Cart wheel Deadlift (for reps) (18 inches from the floor) – 363 kg (800 lb) for 14 reps (2008 Fortissimus)
- Bavarian Stonelift – 275 kg (606 lb) for 85 cm (2012 SCL FIBO)
- Manhood Stone (Max Atlas Stone) – 243 kg (536 lb) over 4 ft bar (2011 Arnold Strongman Classic)
- Manhood Stone (Max Atlas Stone) for reps – 238 kg (525 lb) x 3 reps over 4 ft bar (2008 Arnold Strongman Classic)
- Atlas Stones (110–180 kg set) – 22.31 seconds (2007 IFSA Lithuania Grand Prix) (former world record)
- Atlas Stones (140–180 kg set) in IFSA circle setup – 25.65 seconds (2006 IFSA World Championships) (World Record)
- Natural stone lift to platform – 5 Rocks ranging from 102 to 159 kilograms (225–350 lb) in 19.44 seconds (2010 Lithuania's Strongest Man) (World Record)
- Keg Toss – 25 kg (55 lb) over 5.00 metres (16 ft 5 in) (2004 IFSA Grand Prix Cekol Cup), and 20 kg (44 lb) over 5.18 metres (17 ft 0 in) (2001 Beauty and the Beast)
- Keg Toss – 8 kegs (18–25 kg (40–55 lb)) over 4.80 m bar in 15.71 seconds (2013 Europe's Strongest Man) (World Record)
- Weight over bar – 25 kg (55 lb) over 5.60 metres (18 ft 4 in) (2013 SCL Russia)
- Medicine ball toss – 22 kg (49 lb) for 17 ft (5.18 m) (2004 Arnold Strongman Classic) (joint-world record)
- Front hold – 25 kg (55 lb) for 82.11 seconds (2012 SCL Martinique) (World Record)
- Fingal's Fingers – 210–350 kg (463–772 lb) 5 fingers in 37.56 seconds (2004 World Muscle Power Classic) (World Record)
- Fingal's Fingers – 200–320 kg (441–705 lb) 5 fingers in 28.69 seconds (2009 World's Strongest Man) (World Record)
- Power Stairs (3 x 225 kg (496 lb) Duck walks / total of 15 steps) – 31.60 seconds (2014 Guinness World Records, Italy) (former world record), and 33.97 seconds (2015 World's Strongest Man)
- Power Stairs (204 kg (450 lb), 227 kg (500 lb) & 238 kg (525 lb) Duck walks / total of 15 steps) – 42.07 seconds (2009 Fortissimus) (World Record)
- Tyre flip – 420 kg (926 lb) x 8 flips in 24.24 seconds (2015 Strongman Champions League Holland) (World Record)
- Flip & drag – 360 kg (794 lb) tyre x 4 flips and 400 kg (882 lb) sled drag for 20 meters – 32.06 seconds (2012 SCL Savickas Classic) (World Record)
- Super Yoke – 640 kg (1,410 lb) for 4 meters in 3.87 seconds (2014 Arnold Strongman Classic) (World Record)
- Timber carry – 500 kg (1,100 lb) with straps for 35 ft in 13.01 seconds (2016 Arnold Strongman Classic)
- Sled pull – 550 kg (1,213 lb) for 20-meter course in 21.66 seconds (2005 IFSA Hungary Grand Prix) (World Record)
- Truck pull – 11,000 kg (24,251 lb) for 30-meter course 'uphill' in 43.97 seconds (2002 World's Strongest Man) (World Record)
- Truck pull – 13,000 kg (28,660 lb) for 20-meter course 'extra uphill' in 38.58 seconds (2009 SCL Ukraine) (World Record)
- Truck pull – 20,000 kg (44,092 lb) for 20-meter course 'uphill' in 42.67 seconds (2008 SCL Holland) (World Record)

During training (Self-claims):

- Squat – 440 kg (970 lb) for 2 reps; 425 kg (937 lb) for 3 reps; 400 kg (880 lb) for 5 reps Raw with knee wraps
- Bench press Raw – 285 kg (628 lb)
- Bench press Raw (for reps) – 250 kg (550 lb) for 3 reps
- Deadlift – 435 kg (959 lb) raw with straps on stiff Power bar
- Deadlift (for reps) – 400 kg (880 lb) for 5 reps in preparation for Arnold Strongman Classic 2014 raw with straps on stiff Power bar
- Standing Overhead Press – 200 kg (440 lb) for 5 reps without leg drive
- Log Lift – 205 kg (452 lb) for 5 reps in preparation for Arnold Strongman Classic 2015 on steel IFSA log
- Front Squat – 340 kg (750 lb) for 3 reps, and 320 kg (705 lb) for 5 reps Raw with knee wraps
- 18-inch deadlift – 525 kg (1,157 lb) for 1 rep in preparation for Arnold Strongman Classic 2014 Raw with straps on stiff Power bar

== Competitive record ==
Placements: 115 x 1st places, 31 x 2nd places and 20 x 3rd places = 166 x podium finishes from 202 total competitions.

- Winning percentage: 53.7% at International circuit & 65.5% at National circuit
- Podium percentage: 79.6% at International circuit & 89.1% at National circuit
- Top 5 percentage: 88.4% at International circuit & 94.5% at National circuit

	1st	2nd	3rd	Podium	4th	5th	Top 5	6th	7th	8th	9th	10th	11th	12th	24th	Total
International	79	22	16	117	9	4	130	2	4	1	2	3	2	2	1	147
National	36	9	4	49	1	2	52	1				2				55
Combined	115	31	20	166	10	6	182	3	4	1	2	5	2	2	1	202

Note: Includes only open category competition results, excluding Masters competitions.

== Legacy ==
In his career which spanned 25 years facing 3 generations of strongmen, Žydrūnas has competed in more competitions than anyone else (154) and has won more international competitions than anyone else (84) as well. (Note: Among the 84 wins, 79 are under open category while the other 5 are masters category.) His winning percentage of 54.5% is fourth only to Rayno Nel, Mariusz Pudzianowski and Mitchell Hooper. However, the winning streak and number of victories of Žydrūnas Savickas, as evidenced by nearly 250 trophies and 200 medals, may never be matched. During an interview with strongman analyst Laurence Shahlaei in 2020, Žydrūnas said that Mariusz Pudzianowski, Svend Karlsen, Derek Poundstone, Brian Shaw and Hafþór Júlíus Björnsson are the 5 greatest strongmen he has competed against.

In brief, Žydrūnas has dominated the following competitions:

- World's Strongest Man – 1st place four times: 2009, 2010, 2012, 2014
- World's Strongest Man – 2nd place six times: 2002–2004, 2011, 2013, 2015
- IFSA Strongman World Championships – 1st place two times: 2005, 2006
- Arnold Strongman Classic – 1st place eight times: 2003–2008, 2014, 2016
- Arnold Strongman Classic-Europe – 1st place: 2012
- Europe's Strongest Man – 1st place three times: 2010, 2012, 2013
- Strongman Super Series – 1st place 2004
- Strongman Super Series – 2nd place 2003
- Strongman Champions League – 1st place two times: 2012, 2008
- Lithuania's Strongest Man – 1st place seventeen times between 1998 and 2022.

== Gallery ==
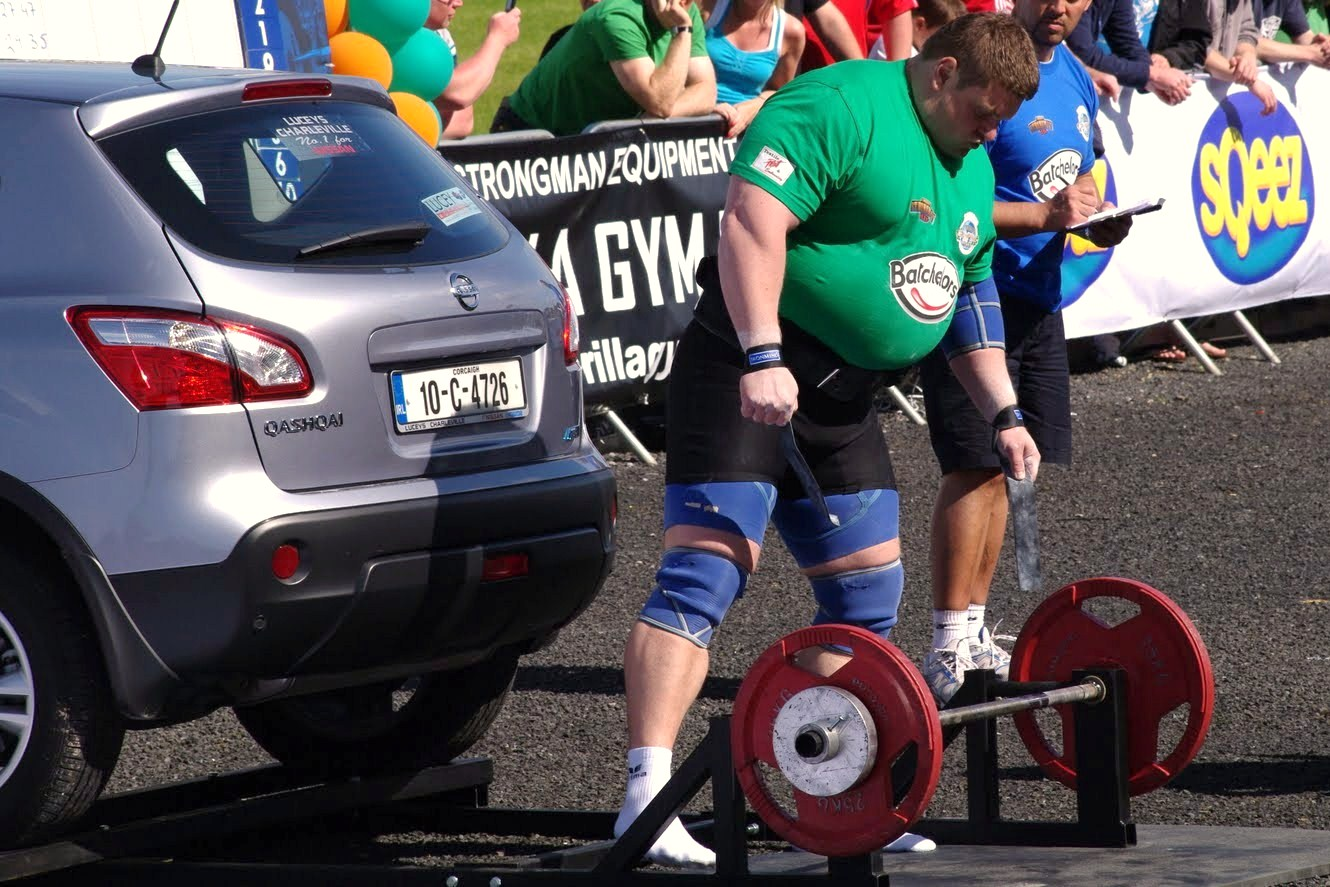
During the Strongman Champions League Ireland contest in Limerick, Ireland, 2010.

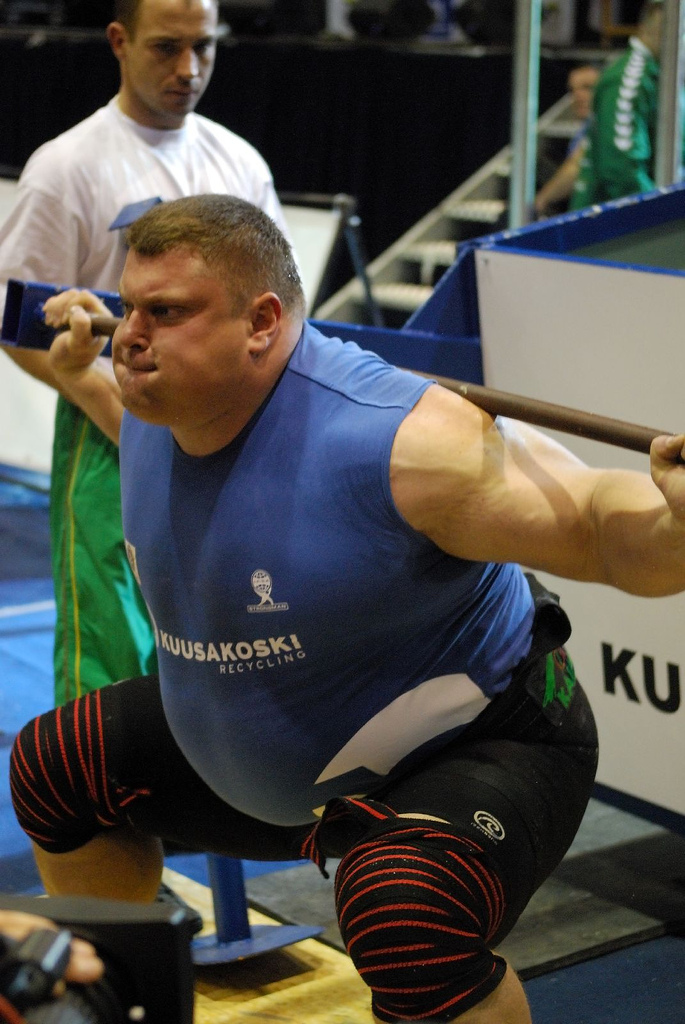
Savickas during the IFSA Strongman World 2-Man Championship in 2007

== Political career ==
Savickas entered politics as a member of the Liberal and Centre Union and expressed interest to run for office since 2008. In 2012, he explained that participating in politics was a "pastime", as he saw his sporting career as his free time and didn't understand what sportsmen are "supposed to do all day".

In 2011, he joined the nonpartisan team of former Mayor of Vilnius, Artūras Zuokas, and won a seat in the Vilnius municipal council in the 2011 local elections. He stated that he does not have large political ambitions and will be an "observer". During his time in office, he led a councillor group on promoting culture and combating alcoholism.

He ran with Zuokas's political party YES in the Biržai-Kupiškis constituency in the 2012 parliamentary election, however, he did not get to the second round. After it merged with the Liberal and Centre Union to form the Lithuanian Freedom Union, he joined the Liberal Movement instead. He ran as their candidate in the Naujoji Vilnia constituency in the 2016 parliamentary election. Describing his political views as a candidate to the Seimas, he identified as a businessman as well as a sportsman, and expressed his desire to lower taxes and reduce the bureaucratic apparatus.

From 2020 onwards, he has been accused of spreading misinformation about George Soros, Antifa, and the COVID-19 vaccine. In 2020, it was reported that he was a moderator of a Lithuanian QAnon conspiracy theory group on Facebook. He was one of the leaders of an anti-restriction protest during the commemoration of the January Events in 2022 and described the pandemic controls of the Šimonytė Cabinet as a "dictatorship" and "anti-constitutional", which got members of the municipal council in his home town Biržai to propose revoking his honorary citizenship.

He switched to the Lithuanian Regions Party and was elected to the council of Molėtai District Municipality on their list in 2023.

== Personal life ==
Savickas married his longtime girlfriend Jurgita Savickienė on July 24, 2010, in Lithuania.

At the end of September 2010, a biography entitled Žydrūnas Savickas – žmogus iš geležies (Žydrūnas Savickas – A Man From Iron) was published in Lithuania.

Zydrunas Savickas has a YouTube channel where he talks on strongman related topics such as recovery, diet, and training habits. In June 2021, Žydrūnas and his wife Jurgita got divorced.

He got married for a second time on October 12, 2022, in Molėtai taking Brigita Lacytė to be his spouse.

== See also ==
- List of strongmen
- List of powerlifters
