= Jimmy Laureys =

Belgian powerlifter

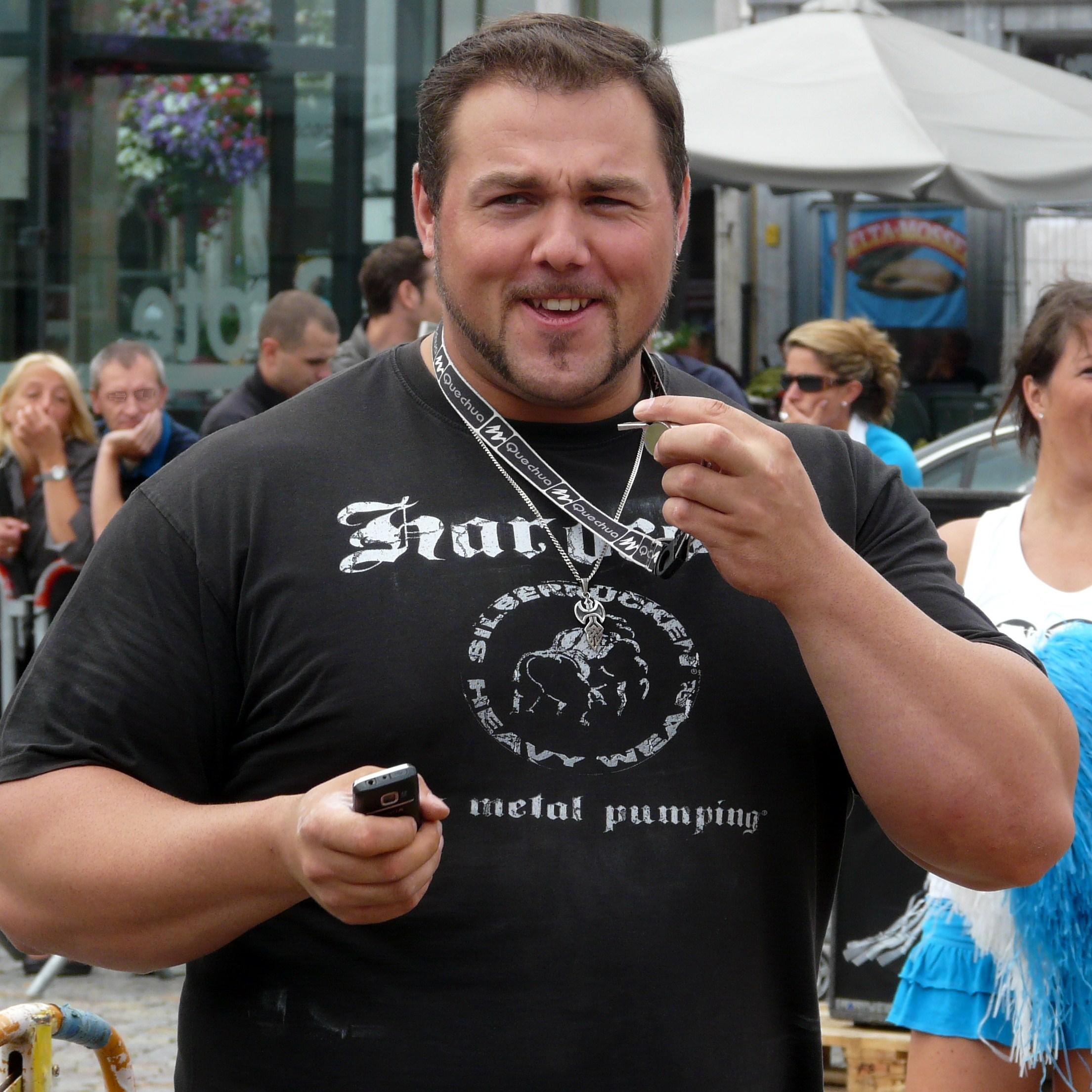
- Laureys in 2011

Personal information
- Born: 7 July 1981 (age 44) Belgium
- Occupation: Strongman
- Height: 193 cm (6 ft 4 in)
Medal record
Strongman
Representing Belgium
World's Strongest Man
Qualified	2009 World's Strongest Man
Strongman Champions League
3rd	Spain 2009
6th	Overall 2009
3rd	Serbia 2011
3rd	Holland 2011
Flanders' Strongest Man
2nd	2001
2nd	2002
Belgium's Strongest Man
1st	2008
1st	2009
1st	2010
1st	2011
1st	2012
1st	2013

Jimmy Laureys (born 7 July 1981) is a Belgian powerlifter and strongman competitor.

== Biography ==
Jimmy was known as ‘King Kong’ at school due to his size. He started training at the age of 15 and by the age of 17, he took up powerlifting. When he was 23 he turned his attention to strength athletics.

Although podium showings in 2001 and 2002 in the Strongest Man in Flanders contests showed Jimmy's potential as a strongman, he concentrated on powerlifting until 2005. From that point forward he began to compete in the Benelux strongman circuit consistently being in the top four in almost every contest he entered, winning 3 of the 8 contests he entered in 2005, predominantly in the Netherlands, with similar success in 2006. His competitive nature led to his nickname in Belgium and Holland becoming 'the Belgian Beast'.

By 2008 he had become Belgian's Strongest Man and he repeated this feat in 2009. 2008 also saw his career graduate to the full international status, with an invitation to compete in the Strongman Champions League. He impressed enough to be invited back in 2009 where he was more consistent, and his improvement was such that he achieved a third-place finish in the Spanish leg of the League in October behind Ervin Katona and eventual League Champion Andrus Murumets.

In 2009, in what was described as the strongest field for many years, Laureys was invited to the World's Strongest Man, being the first Belgian to have the honour. He was drawn in the same group as two previous title holders, Phil Pfister and five times winner Mariusz Pudzianowski. They finished in the top two spots and Laureys failed to qualify for the final. In 2010 he once again was the strongest man of Belgium.

Jimmy has been dominating Belgium's Strongest Man since its inauguration in 2008, and holds the record for most wins with six.

== General stats ==
- Deadlift – 400 kg
- Squat – 345 kg
- Bench press – 230 kg
- Log press – 180 kg
- Leg press – 800 kg

== Competition Record ==
- 2001
  - 2. - Flander's Strongest Man
- 2002
  - 2. - Flander's Strongest Man
- 2008
  - 11. Strongman Champions League Varsseveld
  - 9. Strongman Champions League Wilno
  - 1. - Belgium's Strongest Man
- 2009
  - 1. - Belgium's Strongest Man
  - Q. - 2009 World's Strongest Man
  - 3. Strongman Champions League Spain
  - 6. Strongman Champions League Overall
- 2010
  - 1. - Belgium's Strongest Man
- 2011
  - 1. - Belgium's Strongest Man
- 2012
  - 1. - Belgium's Strongest Man
