= 2010 World's Strongest Man =

Strongman competition in 2010

Competition information
- Dates: 15-22 September 2010
- Venue: Sun City
- Country: South Africa
- Athletes participating: 30
- Nations participating: 15

Champion(s)
- (Lithuania) Zydrunas Savickas

The 2010 World's Strongest Man was the 33rd edition of World's Strongest Man held at Sun City, South Africa from September 15–22, 2010. Zydrunas Savickas won his second title, Brian Shaw placed second, moving up 1 spot from 3rd place the previous year, and Mikhail Koklyaev placed third.

In the finals, Zydrunas Savickas set a new world record in the Giant Wooden Log Lift for Max Weight event by lifting 210 kg (460 lb).

== Line-up ==
=== Competitors – Original listing ===
Name	Nationality	WSM record	Other Strongman Achievements
Hennie Jordan	South Africa		
Jason Bergmann	United States	9th place 2008 World's Strongest Man	2nd place America's Strongest Man 2008
Mark Westaby	United Kingdom		
Richard Skog	Norway		2 time Norway's strongest man 2009 & 2010. 2nd in Giants Live Viking Power Challenge.
Mark Felix	United Kingdom	4th place 2006 World's Strongest Man, 7th place 2007	Rolling Thunder World Champion and World Record Holder; IFSA Britain's Strongest Man 2005
Mikhail Koklyaev	Russia		3rd in 2005, 2nd in 2006 & 2007 IFSA World Championship multiple wins in the Strongman Champions League, 2nd in the 2009 Arnold Strongman Classic
Travis Ortmayer	United States	5th place 2008 & 2009 World's Strongest Man	3rd place 2009 & 2010 Arnold Strongman Classic
Derek Poundstone	United States	2nd place World's Strongest Man 2008, 4th place 2009	2007 & 2008 America's strongest man champion 2 time Arnold Strongman Classic champion in 2009 & 2010; Fortissimus champion 2008, 2nd place 2009; Strongman Super Series World Champion 2008; 3 time Mohegan Sun Super Series champion 2008–2010; Giants Live Ukraine 2010 champion
Brian Shaw	United States	3rd place 2009 World's Strongest Man	3rd at Fortissimus 2009; Winner of 2009 FIT Expo; Strongman Super Series 2009 overall champion
Nick Best	United States		2009 All American Strongman Challenge winner 9th place 2006 IFSA Strongman World Championships; 2nd place Strongman Super Series Romania 2009
Robert Szczepanski	Poland		2nd place Giants Live Poland 2010; IFSA Strongman World Championships 9th place 2005, 6th place 2006, 7th place 2007
Zydrunas Savickas	Lithuania	2009 World's Strongest Man, 2nd place 2002–2004	Six time winner of Arnold Strongman Classic from 2003–2008, 2nd place 2010; 2 time winner IFSA Strongman World Championships, 3rd place 2007; 2008 Strongman Champions League winner 2009 winner Strongest Man on the Planet, 2nd place 2008; 2004 overall winner Strongman Super Series, 3rd in 2002, 2nd in 2003; World Log Lift Champion
Serhiy Romanchuk	Ukraine		
Terry Hollands	United Kingdom	3rd place World's Strongest Man 2007, 7th place 2006, 10th place 2008, 6th place 2009	Britain's Strongest Man 2007; UK's Strongest Man 2005; England's Strongest Man (WSM) 2009
Janusz Kulaga	Poland		
Stefán Sölvi Pétursson	Iceland		Iceland's Strongest Man 2009 & 2010; 2008 IFSA Iceland's Strongest Man; 3rd place Giants Live Poland 2009
Laurence Shahlaei	United Kingdom	9th place 2009 World's Strongest Man	England's Strongest Man 2009
Darren Sadler	United Kingdom		2007 Champion IFSA World Strongman Challenge u105k 2nd 2005 World Championships u105k(IFSA)
Stoyan Todorchev	Bulgaria		
Johannes Årsjö withdrew before competition	Sweden		4th Place Viking Power Challenge 2009
Vytautas Lalas	Lithuania		winner Giants Live 2010 Poland winner Lithuania's Strongest Man 2010, 3rd place 2009
Dave Ostlund	United States	3rd place World's Strongest Man 2008, 9th place 2005, 6th place 2007, 8th place 2009	1st Venice Beach Super Series 2007; 3rd Madison Square Garden Super Series 2008
Warrick Brant	Australia		
Agris Kazelniks	Latvia		2nd place Strongman Champions League Holland Grand Prix 2009; 2nd place overall 2009 Strongman Champions League
Ettiene Smit	South Africa		6 times South Africa's Strongest Man
Ervin Katona	Serbia		2nd place overall 2008 Strongman Champions League; 3 times Serbia's Strongest Man winner 2010 Strongman Champions League Bulgaria winner 2010 Strongman Champions League Serbia
Christian Savoie	Canada		2009 Canada's Strongest Man
Louis Philippe Jean	Canada	10th place 2009 World's Strongest Man	2008 Canada's Strongest Man
Alex Curletto	Italy		
Kostyantyn Ilin	Ukraine		2009 Ukraine's Strongest Man
Reserve: Rob Frampton competed in place of Johannes Årsjö	United Kingdom		
Reserve: Frankie Scheun	South Africa		

== Heat results ==
Qualifying heats in World's Strongest Man involve a series of six events. The field is divided into groups of six competitors with the top two in each of the groups reaching the ten man final. A win in an event gives a competitor 6 points, second place gets 5, and so on (4,3,2,1). If there is a tie at the end of the qualifier, the competitor with the most individual event wins gets the advantage.

=== Heat 1 ===
Position	Name	Nationality	Event 1 Medley	Event 2 Truck Pull	Event 3 Power Stairs	Event 4 Deadlift	Event 5 Overhead Lift	Event 6 Loading Race
1 (30pts)	Brian Shaw	United States	1 (7 in 0:46.53)	1 (0:44.82)	1 (12 in 0:41.58)	2 (7 reps)	1 (4 reps)	6 (2 in 0:36.32)
2 (27pts)	Stefan Solvi Petursson	Iceland	2 (7 in 1:09.18)	3 (1:01.44)	3 (12 in 0:51.13)	4 (4 reps)	2 (3 reps)	1 (4 0:58.11)
3 (20pts)	Mark Felix	England	6 (3 in 1:15.00)	2 (0:49.44)	6 (8 in 1:15.00)	1 (8 reps)	4 (1 rep)	3 (4 1:07.48)
4 (17pts)	Stoyan Todorchev	Bulgaria	3 (6 in 1:15.00)	4 (1:04.35)	2 (12 in 0:50.13)	5 (3 reps)	5 (0 reps)	4 (4 in 1:12.29)
5 (16.5pts)	Serhiy Romanchuk	Ukraine	4 (5 in 1:15.00)	5 (1.00 m)	4 (12 in 0:55.92)	6 (0 reps)	3 (2 reps)	2 (4 in 0:59.76)
6 (11.5pts)	Ettiene Smit	South Africa	4 (5 in 1:15.00)	6 (0.85 m)	5 (11 in 1:15.00)	3 (6 reps)	5 (0 reps)	5 (3 in 0:49.07)

(Shaw and Petursson advance to final)

=== Heat 2 ===
Position	Name	Nationality	Event 1 Giant Farmer's Walk	Event 2 Power Stairs	Event 3 Deadlift	Event 4 Africa Stone	Event 5 Metal Block Press	Event 6 Loading Race
1 (30pts)	Derek Poundstone	United States	3 (36.2m)	3 (9 in 1:15.00s)	1 (6 reps)	2 (63.4m)	1 (3 in 22.23s)	2 (4 in 1:10.63s)
2 (29pts)	Terry Hollands	England	1 (23.28s)	1 (12 in 48.52s)	2 (5 reps)	4 (36.3m)	2 (3 in 44.80s)	3 (4 in 1:11.16s)
3 (20pts)	Richard Skog	Norway	4 (32.9m)	6 (4 in 1:15.00s)	4= (0 reps)	1 (67.4m)	3 (3 in 45.29s)	1 (4 in 48.26s)
4 (17pts)	Alex Curletto	Italy	5 (27.2m)	4 (6 in 1:15.00s)	3 (4 reps)	5 (29.9m)	4 (2 in 25.84s)	4 (3 in 42.48s)
5 (11pts)	Hennie Jordan	South Africa	6 (1.7m)	5 (5 in 1:15.00s)	4= (0 reps)	3 (44.3m)	5 (2 in 52.60s)	5 (2 in 37.25s)
WD (after Rd 4)	Robert Szczepanski†	Poland	2 (27.90s)	2 (11 in 1:15.00s)	4= (0 reps)	WD	WD	WD

(Poundstone and Hollands advance to final)

† Szczepanski left the competition with a biceps injury during the Africa Stone (4th Event). He had 10 points after three events.

=== Heat 3 ===
Position	Name	Nationality	Event 1 Medley	Event 2 Truck Pull	Event 3 Power Stairs	Event 4 Deadlift	Event 5 Dumbbell Press	Event 6 Loading Race
1 (29pts)	Ervin Katona	Serbia	2 (7 flips in 1:05.18s)	1 (52.16s)	1 (12 in 1:01.01s)	2 (8 reps)	4 (5 reps)	3 (4 in 58.28s)
2 (28.5pts)	Travis Ortmayer	United States	1 (7 flips in 1:05.18s)	2 (1:06.19s)	3 (11 in 1:15.00s)	4= (4 reps)	1 (9 reps)	2 (4 in 54.94s)
3 (27.5pts)	Vytautas Lalas	Lithuania	3 (6 flips in 1:15.00s)	3 (1:10.03s)	4 (10 in 1:15.00s)	1 (9 reps)	2= (8 reps)	1 (4 in 46.71s)
4 (17.5pts)	Kostyantyn Ilin	Ukraine	5 (3 flips in 1:15.00s)	5 (0.77m)	5 (8 in 1:15.00s)	3 (5 reps)	2= (8 reps)	4 (4 in 1:14.14s)
5 (15.5pts)	Janusz Kulaga	Poland	4 (5 flips in 1:15.00s)	4 (0.80m)	2 (12 in 1:11.77s)	4= (4 reps)	5 (0 reps)	5 (3 in 37.73s)
WD (after Rd 1)	Darren Sadler†	England	6 (0 flips in 1:15.00s)	WD	WD	WD	WD	WD

(Katona and Ortmayer advance to final)

† Sadler left the competition with a torn biceps injury in the Medley (1st event) almost as soon as it began.

=== Heat 4 ===
Position	Name	Nationality	Event 1 Giant Farmer's Walk	Event 2 Squat Lift	Event 3 Africa Stone	Event 4 Overhead Lift	Event 5 Deadlift Hold	Event 6 Loading Race
1 (27.5pts)	Zydrunas Savickas	Lithuania	1 (21.31s)	1= (11 reps)	2 (62.1m)	1 (8 reps)	3 (1:08.12s)	6 (1 in 22.01s)
2= (25pts)†	Nick Best	United States	3 (29.72s)	3= (10 reps)	1 (79.4m)	6 (0 reps)	1 (1:18.68s)	1 (3 in 36.95s)
2= (25pts)†	Laurence Shahlaei	England	2 (23.75s)	1= (11 reps)	4 (54.2m)	3= (5 reps)	4 (1:02.33s)	2 (3 in 42.05s)
4 (22pts)	Louis-Philippe Jean	Canada	4 (31.16s)	6 (7 reps)	3 (60.8m)	2 (7 reps)	2 (1:10.07s)	3 (3 in 49.95s)
5 (13.5pts)	Warrick Brant	Australia	6 (12.6m)	3= (10 reps)	5 (51.6m)	3= (5 reps)	6 (45.03s)	4 (3 in 1:04.45s)
6 (12pts)	Agris Kazelniks	Latvia	5 (34.6m)	3= (10 reps)	6 (15.3m)	5 (1 rep)	5 (54.35s)	5 (2 in 42.06s)

(Savickas and Best advance to final)

† Although Best and Shahlaei tied in points, the tiebreaker is with individual event wins. Best won three events and Shahlaei only won one, so Best advanced to the final.

=== Heat 5 ===
Position	Name	Nationality	Event 1 Medley	Event 2 Squat Lift	Event 3 Africa Stone	Event 4 Metal Block Press	Event 5 Deadlift Hold	Event 6 Loading Race
1 (28pts)	Jason Bergmann	United States	2 (7 flips in 1:09.91s)	1 (12 reps)	2 (65.6m)	3 (2 in 12.79s)	1 (1:27.00s)	5 (3 in 37.67s)
2 (26pts)	Mikhail Koklyaev	Russia	4 (6 flips in 1:15.00s)	2 (9 reps)	5 (3.9m)	1 (3 in 19.48s)	2 (1:17.23s)	2 (4 in 51.51s)
3 (24pts)	Dave Ostlund	United States	1 (7 flips in 1:04.75s)	6 (2 reps)	4 (57.1m)	2 (3 in 23.20s)	4 (1:12.37s)	1 (4 in 50.01s)
4 (18.5pts)	Mark Westaby	England	3 (7 flips in 1:10.62s)	3= (8 reps)	3 (65.5m)	4 (2 in 26.21s)	6 (50.41s)	4 (4 in 1:06.95s)
5 (16.5pts)	Christian Savoie	Canada	5= (5 flips in 1:15.00s)	5 (6 reps)	1 (67.0m)	6 (1 in 54.47s)	5 (1:09.23s)	3 (4 in 54.20s)
6 (12pts)	Rob Frampton§	England	5= (5 flips in 1:15.00s)	3= (8 reps)	6 (0.0m)	5 (2 in 36.25s)	3 (1:14.85s)	6 (2 in 42.64s)

(Bergmann and Koklyaev advance to final)

§ Frampton, initially a reserve, replaced Johannes Årsjö, who withdrew prior to the competition.

== Final results ==
#	Name	Nationality	Pts	Event 1 Loading Race	Event 2 Keg Toss	Event 3 Giant Log Press	Event 4 Whiskey Barrel Carry	Event 5 Deadlift	Event 6 Atlas Stones
1	Zydrunas Savickas	Lithuania	51.5 (countback 2 wins & one 2nd place)	6 (2 in 0:45.58)	2 (8 in 0:21.19)	1 (210 kg)	1 (0:26.54)	1= (11 reps)	3 (5 in 0:29.64)
2	Brian Shaw	United States	51.5 (countback 2 wins & one 3rd place)	3 (3 in 1:08.89)	1 (8 in 0:20.75)	4 (177.5 kg)	4 (0:40.05)	1= (11 reps)	1 (5 in 0:27.11)
3	Mikhail Koklyaev	Russia	46	2 (3 in 1:08.34)	4 (8 in 0:27.61)	2 (202.5 kg)	5 (0:40.84)	3 (10 reps)	4 (5 in 0:39.83)
4	Stefan Solvi Petursson	Iceland	33	10 (2 in 0:50.13)	5 (8 in 0:36.53)	5 (170 kg)	3 (0:33.67)	8 (5 reps)	2 (5 in 0:28.23)
5	Travis Ortmayer	United States	30.5	1 (3 in 0:58.72)	3 (8 in 0:22.16)	6= (155 kg)	9 (6.4 m)	5= (8 reps)	9 (3 in 0:20.29)
6	Nick Best	United States	27	8 (2 in 0:47.51)	9 (4 in 0:23.14)	6= (155 kg)	2 (0:33.32)	4 (9 reps)	8 (4 in 0:36.01)
7	Ervin Katona	Serbia	25	4 (3 in 1:12.57)	6 (8 in 0:41.69)	6= (155 kg)	6 (35.8 m)	7 (7 reps)	10 (3 in 0:27.12)
8	Terry Hollands	England	24.5	7 (2 in 45.73)	8 (6 in 0:30.63)	6= (155 kg)	7 (26.1 m)	5= (8 reps)	6 (5 in 0:53.23)
9	Derek Poundstone	United States	22	9 ( 2 in 0:48.82)	7 (7 in 0:33.73)	3 (185 kg)	8 (8.1 m)	10 (1 reps)	7 (4 in 0:30.95)
10	Jason Bergmann	United States	19	5 (2 in 0:35.09)	10 (4 in 0:44.28)	6= (155 kg)	10 (2.2 m)	9 (4 reps)	5 (5 in 0:41.30

== Television broadcast ==
=== United States ===
Information needed

=== United Kingdom ===
Bravo again screened both The Giants Live Tour (the official qualifying tour for The World's Strongest Man) as well as the finals. They were both aired before Bravo closed on Saturday 1 January 2011. Giants Live was shown on three consecutive days from Tuesday 21 December 2010 to Thursday 23 December 2010. The finals were broadcast on six consecutive days from Sunday 26 December 2010 to Friday 31 December 2010, with each episode dedicated to a qualifying group, and the sixth episode being the final. The UK broadcast was once again produced by IMG Media for Bravo and featured presenters Martin Bayfield and Alex Reid. The commentators were Paul Dickenson and Colin J L Bryce and the outside broadcast was performed by 021 Television Ltd.

Preceded by 2009 World's Strongest Man	2010 World's Strongest Man	Succeeded by 2011 World's Strongest Man
