= Strongman Champions League =

Strongman competition

- The official logo of the Strongman Champions League

Tournament information
- Location: Various international locations
- Month played: multiple grand prix events held throughout the year
- Established: 2008 by Ilkka Kinnunen and Marcel Mostert
- Format: Multi-event competition
- Purse: varies
- Website: Official website

Current champion
- (South Africa) Rayno Nel

The Strongman Champions League is a Strongman competition circuit, with several Grand Prix events throughout the year and the Strongman Champions League overall champion title going to the overall winner at the end of the season. Competitors include icons in the sport, including Žydrūnas Savickas, Hafþór Júlíus Björnsson, Aivars Šmaukstelis, Krzysztof Radzikowski, Ervin Katona, Matjaz Belsak, Mateusz Kieliszkowski, Dainis Zageris, Oleksii Novikov, Mikhail Koklyaev, J.F. Caron, Rayno Nel, Vytautas Lalas, Kelvin de Ruiter, Laurence Shahlaei, Travis Ortmayer, Andrus Murumets, Pavlo Kordiyaka, Rauno Heinla, Martin Wildauer, Tom Stoltman, Terry Hollands, Eddie Hall, Nick Best, Dennis Kohlruss and Rayno Nel.

Initially in close partnership with IFSA, it quickly asserted its independence and has acted as a unifying force in the world of strength athletics, bringing together athletes from IFSA with those affiliated to the World's Strongest Man circuit, and having close cooperation with other major events such as Fortissimus. In 2012, SCL began co-promoting the new Arnold Strongman Classic-Europe contest which will become part of the annual SCL season of events.

== History ==
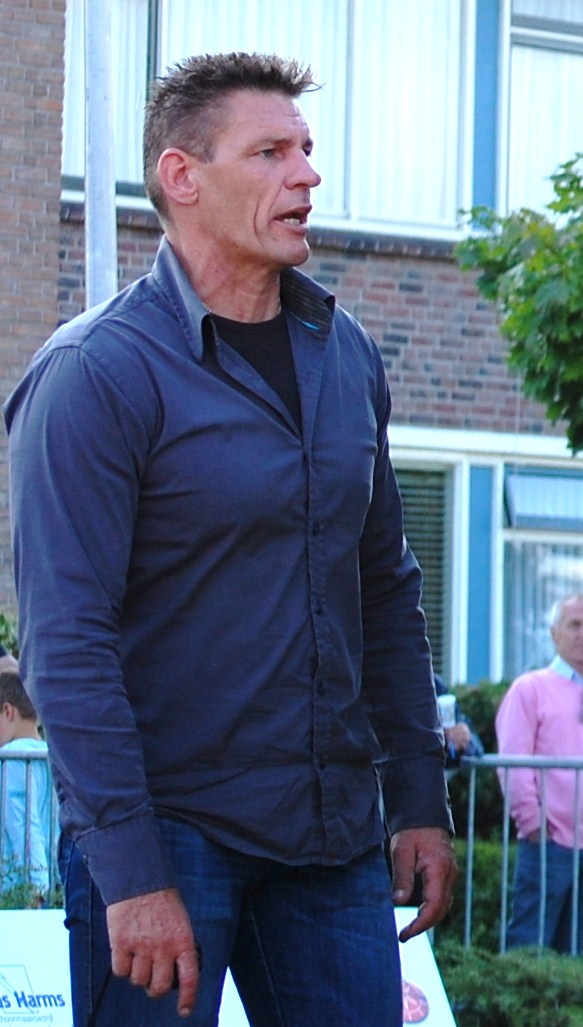
Marcel Mostert.

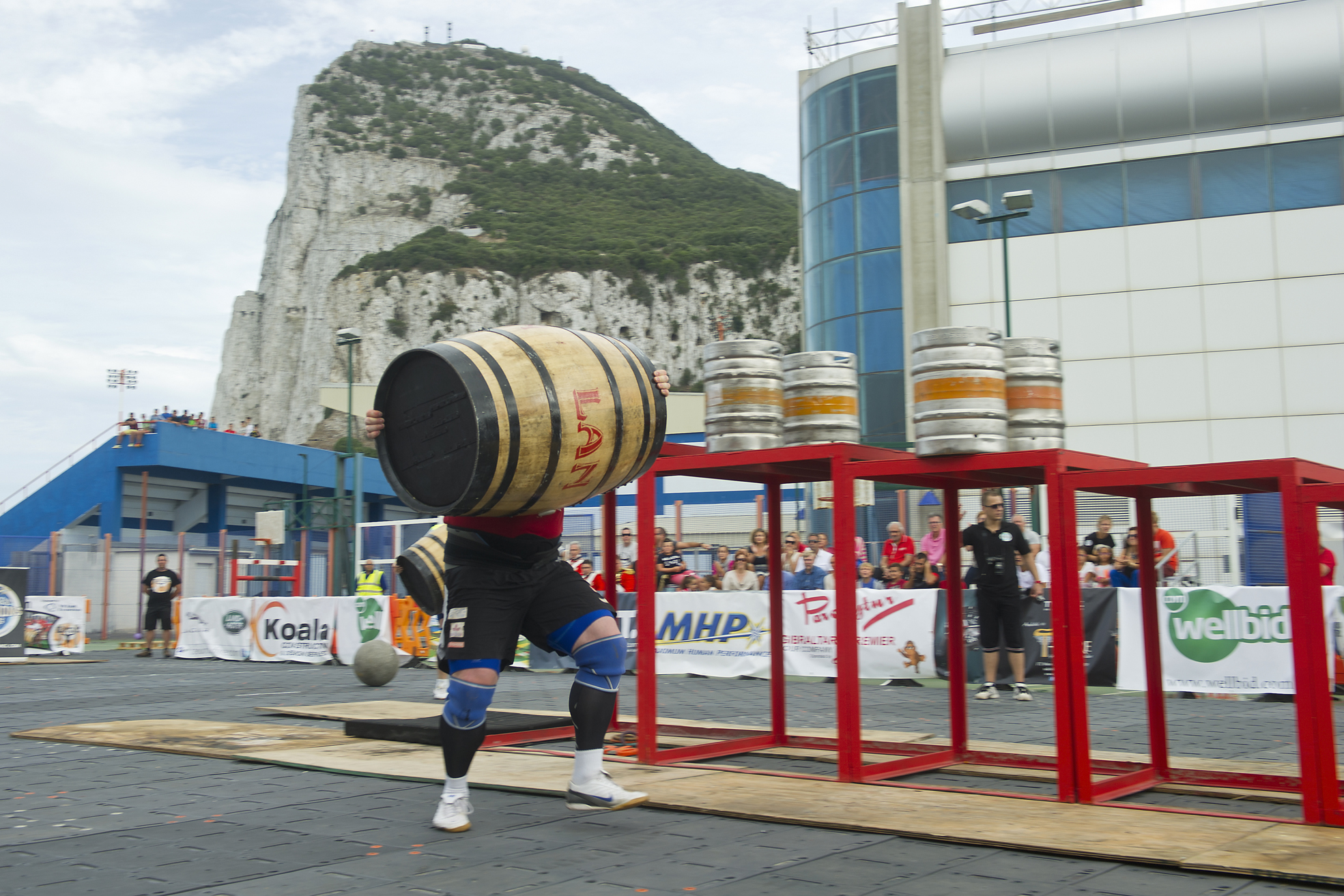
Loading race.

The Strongman Champions League was developed by Ilkka Kinnunen and Marcel Mostert, longtime strongman promoters, with major contests to their credit worldwide, and was launched in 2008. Kinnunen & Mostert described SCL as "a new episode in strongman".

"A complete series of 10–12 competitions, that will take place all over the world, but most of the competitions will be held in Europe. The very best champions, referees and their organizers will be the guarantee of a great new, fresh excitement in Strongman sport. The competition venues are the best which each country can offer and it will include the country's own traditional elements." As well as citing that all points will be accumulated for a Champions League Winner at the end of the year, it was stated in the main structure of the Champions League that rules will be done officially as usual in all IFSA competitions and that the top 3 will be directly placed in the IFSA World Championships. Mostert also said "All together we think that this is a perfect platform of competitions that will lead to another great World Championship."

Thus, IFSA were inextricably linked at the inception of the league. IFSA, however, were in reportedly dire financial straits towards the end of that year. By December, Mostert distanced the league from the ailing governing body and explicitly said that the "Strongman Champions League had nothing to do with IFSA". He told IronMind "We have our own logo, we have our own brand, we do our own competitions." Its own website was launched shortly afterwards.

The league organizers had originally reported that the Champions League competitions will be televised and spread all over the world. In the harsh economic climate of 2008, the league was not immune to the effects, and the league did have to cancel some venues, but unlike with the IFSA, the vast majority of the competitions still took place. In 2008, the SCL had 45 top strength athletes competing, representing more than 20 countries.

=== Fortissimus Cooperation ===
In 2008, Paul Ohl stated that the Strongman Champions League was one of three organizations that had made an agreement with Fortissimus in order to unite the world strength community, the others being the American Strongman Corporation and the Aussiepower organization. Within the agreement, Fortissimus, the competition that confers the title of "Strongest Man on the Planet", guaranteed that the winner of the America's Strongest Man title would be granted a slot in Fortissimus from 2009, as would the winner of the Australia's Strongest Man title. The agreement with the Strongman Champions League went further, stating that the top three athletes would have guaranteed places and in return, the top Canadian athletes would have guaranteed selected participation in the Champions League. This later went further, guaranteeing the SCL its top five athletes would have places. The agreement was reemphasised in a joint statement from Marcel Mostert and Paul Ohl in early 2009.

=== 2009 and links with World's Strongest Man ===
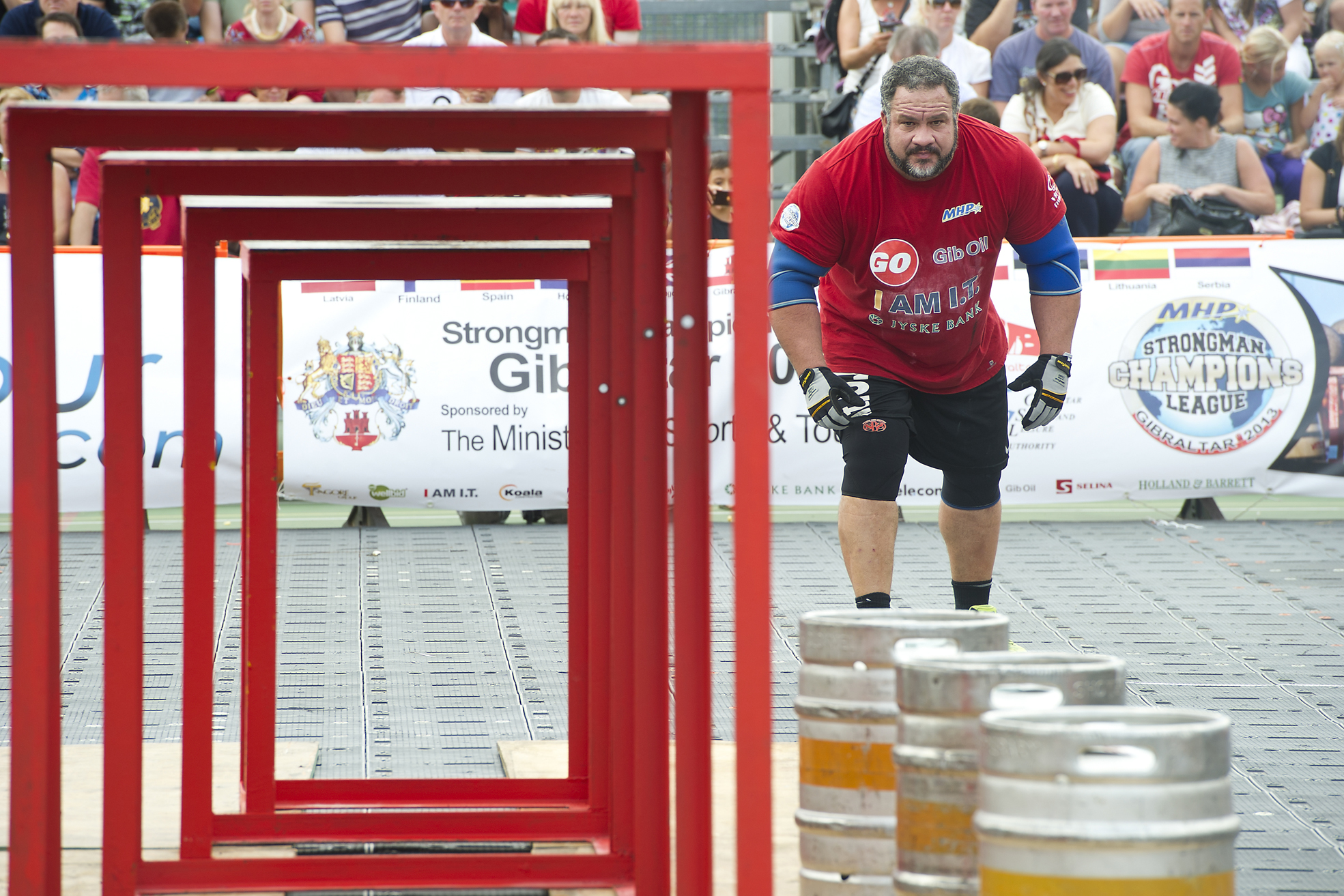
Strongman Champions League in Gibraltar.

The 2009 programme was planned with ten major contests on schedule. In addition, feeder contests were introduced, one happening in Spain in December 2008 and a further event in Germany called the FIBO Strongman Classic in April 2009. The best two athletes from this FIBO Classic 2009 edition were guaranteed into the Champions League, and it was postulated that this German event would be promoted to full SCL status in 2010.

The Strongman Champions League importantly made further progress in acting as a fundamental part of a unifying movement for world strength athletics by making plans to help get its athletes to the 2009 World's Strongest Man contest. Mostert stated that "The top 5 SCL athletes will have places in the Giants Live tour for qualifying at World's Strongest Man (WSM) 2009". In addition, he also stated that wild cards for the WSM will include SCL athletes. He went on to say that "Finally we made it all possible again that all the athletes have chances to qualify for the WSM, which means in my opinion the WSM will have the strongest field ever in her history!". He went on to thank TWI/IMG and Giants Live for their part in making these possibilities. This was groundbreaking because for a number of years prior to this, the athletes under the IFSA had been banned by the federation from entering WSM (since the IFSA fell out of favour with TWI). Likewise, the athletes invited to participate in WSM were not invited to participate in IFSA events. Some competitions bridged the divide, such as the Arnold Strongman Classic and more recently Fortissimus, but neither had the history, gravitas, or popular appeal of the World's Strongest Man. The IFSA athletes, with the demise of the IFSA finances, almost all competed in SCL from 2008. This deal, along with the Fortissimus deal before it, united strongman in a way it had not been since 2004.

The 2009 season began properly on 9 May, with the Strongman Champions League Serbia. Finland followed on 16 May, with Slovakia and the Netherlands in June.

== Results ==
List of SCL Season Champions
Year	Athlete	Nationality
2008	Žydrūnas Savickas	Lithuania
2009	Andrus Murumets	Estonia
2010	Terry Hollands	United Kingdom
2011	Ervin Katona	Serbia
2012	Žydrūnas Savickas	Lithuania
2013	Krzysztof Radzikowski	Poland
2014	Martin Wildauer	Austria
2015	Krzysztof Radzikowski	Poland
2016	Dainis Zageris	Latvia
2017	Matjaz Belsak	Slovenia
2018	Dainis Zageris	Latvia
2019	Aivars Šmaukstelis	Latvia
2021	Kelvin de Ruiter	Netherlands
2022	Aivars Šmaukstelis	Latvia
2023	Oskar Ziółkowski	Poland
2024	Rayno Nel	South Africa
2025	Rayno Nel	South Africa
2026	Rayno Nel	South Africa

Top 10 List of Most Individual Event Wins
Athlete	Nationality	Wins
Žydrūnas Savickas	Lithuania	34
Aivars Šmaukstelis	Latvia	17
Krzysztof Radzikowski	Poland	16
Dainis Zageris	Latvia	15
Ervin Katona	Serbia	13
Hafþór Júlíus Björnsson	Iceland	9
Matjaz Belsak	Slovenia	8
Kelvin de Ruiter	Netherlands	7
Mikhail Koklyaev	Russia	7
Rayno Nel	South Africa	7
Adam Roszkowski	Poland	6

=== 2008 ===
Name and Location	Champion	Runner-Up	Runner-Up	Date
Riga, Latvia SCL Latvia	(Lithuania) Žydrūnas Savickas	(United States) Travis Ortmayer	(Latvia) Agris Kazelniks	22 March 2008
Subotica, Serbia SCL Serbia	(Lithuania) Žydrūnas Savickas (2)	(Serbia) Ervin Katona	(Estonia) Andrus Murumets	10 May 2008
Varsseveld, Netherlands SCL Holland	(Lithuania) Žydrūnas Savickas (3)	(Estonia) Andrus Murumets	(United States) Travis Ortmayer	1 June 2008
Sofia, Bulgaria SCL Bulgaria	(Estonia) Andrus Murumets	(Lithuania) Žydrūnas Savickas	(Serbia) Ervin Katona	21 June 2008
Vilnius, Lithuania SCL Lithuania	(Lithuania) Žydrūnas Savickas (4)	(Lithuania) Vidas Blekaitis	(Lithuania) Saulius Brusokas	2 August 2008
Constanța, Romania SCL Romania	(Lithuania) Žydrūnas Savickas (5)	(Serbia) Ervin Katona	(Ukraine) Oleksandr Lashyn	16 August 2008
Kokkola, Finland SCL Finland	(Russia) Mikhail Koklyaev	(Lithuania) Žydrūnas Savickas	(Serbia) Ervin Katona	29 August 2008
Overall placings	(Lithuania) Žydrūnas Savickas; 130 points	(Serbia) Ervin Katona; 72 points	(Latvia) Agris Kazelniks; 60 points	

=== 2009 ===
Name and Location	Champion	Runner-Up	Runner-Up	Date
Subotica, Serbia SCL Serbia	(Russia) Mikhail Koklyaev (2)	(Estonia) Andrus Murumets	(United States) Travis Ortmayer	9 May 2009
Ideapark, Finland SCL Finland	(Estonia) Andrus Murumets (2)	(Lithuania) Vidas Blekaitis	(Austria) Martin Wildauer	16–17 May 2009
Bratislava, Slovakia SCL Slovakia	(Estonia) Andrus Murumets (3)	(United Kingdom) Terry Hollands	(Russia) Alexander Klyushev	7 June 2009
Terborg, Netherlands SCL Holland	(Russia) Mikhail Koklyaev (3)	(Latvia) Agris Kazelniks	(Netherlands) Richard van der Linden	14 June 2009
Los Barrios, Spain SCL Spain	(Serbia) Ervin Katona	(Estonia) Andrus Murumets	(Belgium) Jimmy Laureys	10 October 2009
London, England SCL England	(Lithuania) Žydrūnas Savickas (6)	(United Kingdom) Mark Felix	(Estonia) Andrus Murumets	18 October 2009
Pécs, Hungary SCL Hungary	(Lithuania) Žydrūnas Savickas (7)	(Estonia) Andrus Murumets	(Serbia) Ervin Katona	29 October 2009
Kyiv, Ukraine SCL 2009 Finals	(Lithuania) Žydrūnas Savickas (8)	(United States) Travis Ortmayer	(Latvia) Agris Kazelniks	14 November 2009
Overall placings	(Estonia) Andrus Murumets; 105 points	(Latvia) Agris Kazelniks; 68 points	(Lithuania) Žydrūnas Savickas; 60 points	

==== 2009 Qualifiers ====
The Strongman Champions League introduced qualifying competitions for 2009. From these competitions, the top two were guaranteed places in the SCL. The first qualifier was held in Los Barrios, Spain. The second was the FIBO Classic in Germany.

Name and Location	Champion	Runner-Up	Runner-Up	Date
Los Barrios, Spain Spanish International Challenge	(Netherlands) Jarno Hams	(Serbia) Ervin Katona	(United States) Steve MacDonald	December 2008
Germany SCL FIBO	(United States) Travis Ortmayer	(Austria) Martin Wildauer	(Germany) Igor Werner	April 2009

=== 2010 ===
Name and Location	Champion	Runner-Up	Runner-Up	Date
Kuusamo, Lapland SCL Iceman Challenge	(Lithuania) Žydrūnas Savickas (9)	(United Kingdom) Terry Hollands	(Ukraine) Konstiantyn Ilin	21 March 2010
Essen, Germany SCL FIBO	(Russia) Mikhail Koklyaev (4)	(United Kingdom) Terry Hollands	(United States) Travis Ortmayer	24 April 2010
Ideapark, Finland SCL Finland	(Russia) Mikhail Koklyaev (5)	(United Kingdom) Terry Hollands	(United States) Travis Ortmayer	16 May 2010
Limerick, Ireland SCL Ireland	(Lithuania) Žydrūnas Savickas (10)/ (United Kingdom) Terry Hollands tie		(Latvia) Agris Kazelniks	6 June 2010
Sofia, Bulgaria SCL Bulgaria	(Serbia) Ervin Katona (2)	(Sweden) Johannes Arsjo	(United Kingdom) Terry Hollands	13 June 2010
Ulft, Netherlands SCL Holland	(United States) Travis Ortmayer	(Russia) Mikhail Koklyaev	(Serbia) Ervin Katona	20 June 2010
Belgrade, Serbia SCL Serbia	(Serbia) Ervin Katona (3)	(Latvia) Agris Kazelniks	(Hungary) Gabor Fargacs	29 August 2010
Bratislava, Slovakia SCL Slovakia	(Serbia) Ervin Katona (4)	(United Kingdom) Terry Hollands	(Ukraine) Konstiantyn Ilin	9 October 2010
Kyiv, Ukraine SCL 2010 Finals	(Ukraine) Serhiy Romanchuk	(Latvia) Agris Kazelniks	(Russia) Mikhail Koklyaev	18 December 2010
Overall placings	(United Kingdom) Terry Hollands; 132 points	(Serbia) Ervin Katona; 106 points	(Russia) Mikhail Koklyaev; 98 points	

=== 2011 ===
Name and Location	Champion	Runner-Up	Runner-Up	Date
Kuusamo, Lapland SCL Iceman Challenge II	(Lithuania) Žydrūnas Savickas (11)	(Sweden) Johannes Arsjo	(Serbia) Ervin Katona	19 March 2011
Essen, Germany SCL FIBO	(Lithuania) Žydrūnas Savickas (12)	(United Kingdom) Terry Hollands	(Austria) Martin Wildauer	16 April 2011
Novi Sad, Serbia SCL Serbia	(Serbia) Ervin Katona (5)	(Sweden) Johannes Arsjo	(Belgium) Jimmy Laureys	21 May 2011
Pretoria, South Africa SCL South Africa	(Iran) Laurence Shahlaei	(South Africa) Etienne Smit	(Australia) Warrick Brant	8 June 2011
Tampere, Finland SCL Finland	(Lithuania) Vytautas Lalas	(Iran) Laurence Shahlaei	(Serbia) Ervin Katona	12 June 2011
Tolkamer, Netherlands SCL Holland	(Iran) Laurence Shahlaei (2)	(Serbia) Ervin Katona	(Belgium) Jimmy Laureys	18 June 2011
Bulgaria SCL Bulgaria	(Serbia) Ervin Katona (6)	(Lithuania) Vytautas Lalas	(United Kingdom) Rob Frampton	25 June 2011
Gran Canaria, Spain SCL Canary Islands	(Serbia) Ervin Katona (7)	(Finland) Tomi Lotta	(Netherlands) Jarno Hams	3 September 2011
Košice, Slovakia SCL Slovakia	(Ukraine) Konstiantyn Ilin	(Slovakia) Branislav Golier	(Finland) Tomi Lotta	10 September 2011
New Brunswick, Canada SCL Canada	(Lithuania) Žydrūnas Savickas (13)	(Canada) Jean-François Caron	(Iran) Laurence Shahlaei	30 September – 2 October 2011
Riga, Latvia SCL Latvia	(Lithuania) Žydrūnas Savickas (14)	(Canada) Jean-François Caron	(Latvia) Agris Kazelniks	18–19 November 2011
Sarajevo, Bosnia and Herzegovina SCL 2011 Finals	(Lithuania) Žydrūnas Savickas (15)	(Canada) Jean-François Caron	(Serbia) Ervin Katona	7 February 2012
Overall placings	(Serbia) Ervin Katona; 201 points	(Lithuania) Žydrūnas Savickas; 176 points	(Iran) Laurence Shahlaei; 106 points	

=== 2012 ===
Name and Location	Champion	Runner-Up	Runner-Up	Date
Kuusamo, Lapland SCL Iceman Challenge III	(Lithuania) Žydrūnas Savickas (16)	(Iran) Laurence Shahlaei	(Poland) Janusz Kulaga	9–10 March 2012
Germany SCL FIBO	(Lithuania) Žydrūnas Savickas (17)	(Iran) Laurence Shahlaei	(Serbia) Ervin Katona	22 April 2012
Novi Sad, Serbia SCL Serbia	(Serbia) Ervin Katona (8)	(United Kingdom) Terry Hollands	(Estonia) Lauri Nami	5 May 2012
Zevenaar, Netherlands SCL Holland	(Lithuania) Žydrūnas Savickas (18)	(Iran) Laurence Shahlaei	(Netherlands) Jarno Hams	30 June 2012
Jiangsu, China SCL World Shanghai Cup	(Lithuania) Žydrūnas Savickas (19)	(Iran) Laurence Shahlaei	(Serbia) Ervin Katona	4–8 July 2012
Porto, Portugal SCL Portugal	(Lithuania) Žydrūnas Savickas (20)	(Serbia) Ervin Katona	(United Kingdom) Terry Hollands	21 July 2012
Alaharma, Finland SCL Finland	(Lithuania) Žydrūnas Savickas (21)	(Russia) Mikhail Koklyaev	(United Kingdom) Terry Hollands	11 August 2012
Trzebnica, Poland SCL Poland	(Lithuania) Žydrūnas Savickas (22)/ (Russia) Mikhail Koklyaev (6) tie		(Poland) Krzysztof Radzikowski	18 August 2012
Vladivostok, Russia SCL Russia	(Russia) Mikhail Koklyaev (7)	(Sweden) Johannes Arsjo	(Lithuania) Marius Lalas	25 August 2012
Gibraltar SCL Gibraltar	(Lithuania) Žydrūnas Savickas (23)	(Estonia) Lauri Nami	(United Kingdom) Terry Hollands	2 September 2012
Bansko, Bulgaria SCL Bulgaria	(Poland) Rafal Kobylarz	(Lithuania) Saulius Brusokas	(Romania) Paul Pirjol	22 September 2012
Vilnius, Lithuania SCL Savickas Classic	(Lithuania) Žydrūnas Savickas (24)	(Lithuania) Vidas Blekaitis	(Lithuania) Vytautas Lalas	6 October 2012
Madrid, Spain Arnold Strongman Classic-Europe	(Lithuania) Žydrūnas Savickas (25)	(Poland) Krzysztof Radzikowski	(Lithuania) Vytautas Lalas	13–14 October 2012
Fort-de-France, Martinique SCL 2012 World Finals	(Lithuania) Žydrūnas Savickas (26)	(Russia) Mikhail Koklyaev	(Poland) Krzysztof Radzikowski	16–18 November 2012
Overall placings	(Lithuania) Žydrūnas Savickas; 275 points	(Serbia) Ervin Katona; 130 points	(Russia) Mikhail Koklyaev; 114 points	

=== 2013 ===
Name and Location	Champion	Runner-Up	Runner-Up	Date
Kuusamo, Lapland SCL Iceman Challenge IV	(Poland) Krzysztof Radzikowski	(Finland) Tomi Lotta	(Iran) Laurence Shahlaei	16 March 2013
Germany SCL FIBO	(Lithuania) Vytautas Lalas	(Iceland) Hafþór Júlíus Björnsson	(Poland) Krzysztof Radzikowski	13 April 2013
Novi Sad, Serbia SCL Serbia	(Serbia) Ervin Katona (9)	(Austria) Martin Wildauer	(Latvia) Dainis Zageris	18 May 2013
Olaine, Latvia SCL Latvia	(Iceland) Hafþór Júlíus Björnsson	(Latvia) Dainis Zageris	(Estonia) Meelis Peil	26 May 2013
Plzeň, Czech Republic SCL Czech	(Poland) Krzysztof Radzikowski (2)	(Lithuania) Vytautas Lalas	(Estonia) Lauri Nami	9 June 2013
Kalkar, Germany SCL Holland	(Lithuania) Žydrūnas Savickas (27)	(Iceland) Hafþór Júlíus Björnsson	(Poland) Krzysztof Radzikowski	22 June 2013
Jiangsu, China SCL World Shanghai Cup	(Lithuania) Žydrūnas Savickas (28)	(Iceland) Hafþór Júlíus Björnsson	(Canada) Jean-François Caron	9–13 July 2013
Tavira, Portugal SCL Portugal	(Poland) Krzysztof Radzikowski (3)	(Norway) Bjorn Andre Solvang	(Lithuania) Vytautas Lalas	27 July 2013
Finland SCL World Truck Pull Championships	(Serbia) Ervin Katona (10)	(Finland) Antti Mourujärvi	(Estonia) Meelis Peil	10 August 2013
Budapest, Hungary SCL Hungary	(Serbia) Ervin Katona (11)	(Poland) Krzysztof Radzikowski	(Estonia) Meelis Peil	31 August 2013
Košice, Slovakia SCL Slovakia	(Estonia) Lauri Nami	(Poland) Krzysztof Radzikowski	(Austria) Martin Wildauer	7 September 2013
Vladivostok, Russia SCL Russia	(Lithuania) Žydrūnas Savickas (29)	(United States) Mike Burke	(Iceland) Hafþór Júlíus Björnsson	14 September 2013
Kartuzy, Poland SCL Poland	(Poland) Krzysztof Radzikowski (4)	(Lithuania) Žydrūnas Savickas	(Latvia) Dainis Zageris	21 September 2013
Gibraltar SCL Gibraltar	(Lithuania) Žydrūnas Savickas (30)	(Poland) Krzysztof Radzikowski	(Latvia) Dainis Zageris	28 September 2013
Tallinn, Estonia SCL Estonia	(Estonia) Meelis Peil	(Poland) Krzysztof Radzikowski	(Estonia) Lauri Nami	5 October 2013
Vilnius, Lithuania SCL Savickas Classic	(Lithuania) Žydrūnas Savickas (31)	(Lithuania) Vidas Blekaitis	(Poland) Krzysztof Radzikowski	20 October 2013
São Paulo, Brazil SCL 2013 Brazil	(Lithuania) Žydrūnas Savickas (32)	(Poland) Krzysztof Radzikowski	(Iceland) Hafþór Júlíus Björnsson	8 November 2013
Kuala Lumpur, Malaysia SCL World Finals	(Lithuania) Žydrūnas Savickas (33)	(United States) Mike Burke	(Poland) Krzysztof Radzikowski	23 November 2013
Overall placings	(Poland) Krzysztof Radzikowski; 257 points	(Lithuania) Žydrūnas Savickas; 193 points	(Serbia) Ervin Katona; 175 points	

=== 2014 ===
Name and Location	Champion	Runner-Up	Runner-Up	Date
Fort-de-France, Martinique SCL Martinique	(Serbia) Ervin Katona (12)	(Austria) Gerald Gschiel	(Estonia) Lauri Nami	15–16 March 2014
Cologne, Germany SCL FIBO	(Lithuania) Žydrūnas Savickas (34)	(Austria) Martin Wildauer	(Serbia) Ervin Katona	5 April 2014
Novi Sad, Serbia SCL Serbia	(Iceland) Hafþór Júlíus Björnsson (2)	(Serbia) Ervin Katona	(Austria) Martin Wildauer	10 May 2014
Vaasa, Finland SCL Finland	(Iceland) Hafþór Júlíus Björnsson (3)	(Lithuania) Marius Lalas	(Estonia) Rauno Heinla	13 June 2014
Doetinchem, Netherlands SCL Holland	(Iceland) Hafþór Júlíus Björnsson (4)	(Poland) Grzegorz Szymanski	(Netherlands) Alex Moonen	21 June 2014
Olaine, Latvia SCL Latvia	(Poland) Rafal Kobylarz (2)	(Lithuania) Vidas Blekaitis	(Austria) Martin Wildauer	29 June 2014
Tavira, Portugal SCL Portugal	(Austria) Martin Wildauer	(Latvia) Dainis Zageris	(Estonia) Lauri Nami	4 July 2014
Split, Croatia SCL Croatia	(Serbia) Ervin Katona (13)	(Austria) Martin Wildauer	(Poland) Krzysztof Radzikowski	19 July 2014
Kartuzy, Poland SCL Poland	(Poland) Krzysztof Radzikowski (5)	(Austria) Martin Wildauer	(Lithuania) Vidas Blekaitis	3 August 2014
Győr, Hungary SCL Hungary	(Poland) Krzysztof Radzikowski (6)	(Serbia) Ervin Katona	(Slovenia) Matjaz Belsak	30 August 2014
Lusaka, Zambia SCL Zambia	(Poland) Krzysztof Radzikowski (7)	(Serbia) Ervin Katona	(Latvia) Dainis Zageris	13 September 2014
Sibiu, Romania SCL Romania	(Poland) Krzysztof Radzikowski (8)	(Serbia) Ervin Katona	(Austria) Martin Wildauer	21 September 2014
Vilnius, Lithuania SCL Savickas Classic	(Estonia) Rauno Heinla	(Lithuania) Vidas Blekaitis	(Slovenia) Matjaz Belsak	5 October 2014
Tallinn, Estonia SCL Estonia	(Estonia) Rauno Heinla (2)	(Austria) Martin Wildauer	(Poland) Krzysztof Radzikowski	18 October 2014
Malaysia SCL 2014 Finals	(Iceland) Hafþór Júlíus Björnsson (5)	(United Kingdom) Eddie Hall	(Poland) Krzysztof Radzikowski	14–15 November 2014
Overall placings	(Austria) Martin Wildauer; 198 points	(Poland) Krzysztof Radzikowski; 195 points	(Serbia) Ervin Katona; 175 points	

=== 2015 ===
Name and Location	Champion	Runner-Up	Runner-Up	Date
Vinstra, Norway SCL World's Strongest Viking	(Iceland) Hafþór Júlíus Björnsson (6)	(Poland) Krzysztof Radzikowski	(Canada) Jean-François Caron	31 January 2015
Cologne, Germany SCL FIBO	(Poland) Krzysztof Radzikowski (9)	(Slovenia) Matjaz Belsak	(Canada) Jean-François Caron	11 April 2015
Ulft, Netherlands SCL Holland	(Poland) Grzegorz Szymanski	(Lithuania) Žydrūnas Savickas	(Latvia) Dainis Zageris	6 June 2015
Merikarvia, Finland SCL Finland	(Poland) Krzysztof Radzikowski (10)	(Lithuania) Žydrūnas Savickas	(Estonia) Rauno Heinla	13 June 2015
Plovdiv, Bulgaria SCL Bulgaria	(Iceland) Hafþór Júlíus Björnsson (7)	(Poland) Krzysztof Radzikowski	(Bulgaria) Stojan Todorchev	20 June 2015
Olaine, Latvia SCL Latvia	(Latvia) Dainis Zageris	(Latvia) Oskars Martuzans	(Poland) Krzysztof Radzikowski	27 June 2015
Split, Croatia SCL Croatia	(Iceland) Hafþór Júlíus Björnsson (8)	(Poland) Krzysztof Radzikowski	(Bulgaria) Stojan Todorchev	29 August 2015
Lubaczów, Poland SCL Poland	(Poland) Grzegorz Szymanski (2)	(Latvia) Dainis Zageris	(Poland) Krzysztof Radzikowski	6 September 2015
Kufstein, Austria SCL Austria	(Lithuania) Marius Lalas	(Poland) Krzysztof Radzikowski	(Slovenia) Matjaz Belsak	12 September 2015
Sibiu, Romania SCL Romania	(Latvia) Dainis Zageris (2)	(Poland) Krzysztof Radzikowski	(Netherlands) Alex Moonen	21 September 2015
Vilnius, Lithuania SCL Savickas Classic	(Lithuania) Marius Lalas (2)	(Poland) Grzegorz Szymanski	(Canada) Jean-François Caron	4 October 2015
Porto, Portugal SCL Portugal	(Canada) Jean-François Caron	(Poland) Krzysztof Radzikowski	(Norway) Bjorn Solvang	10 October 2015
Fort-de-France, Martinique SCL Martinique	(Latvia) Dainis Zageris (3)	(Canada) Jean-François Caron	(Slovenia) Matjaz Belsak	25 October 2015
Turkey SCL 2015 World Finals	(Poland) Krzysztof Radzikowski (11)	(Latvia) Dainis Zageris	(Netherlands) Alex Moonen	5 December 2015
Overall placing	(Poland) Krzysztof Radzikowski; 256 points	(Latvia) Dainis Zageris; 213 points	(Canada) Jean-François Caron; 130 points	

=== 2016 ===
Name and Location	Champion	Runner-Up	Runner-Up	Date
Vinstra, Norway SCL World's Strongest Viking	(Canada) Jean-François Caron (2)	(Slovenia) Matjaz Belsak	(Poland) Krzysztof Radzikowski	30 January 2016
Cologne, Germany SCL FIBO	(Poland) Krzysztof Radzikowski (12)	(Slovenia) Matjaz Belsak	(Bulgaria) Stojan Todorchev	9 April 2016
Zelhem, Netherlands SCL Holland	(United States) Eric Dawson	(Netherlands) Alex Moonen	(Lithuania) Marius Lalas	11 June 2016
Olaine, Latvia SCL Latvia	(Latvia) Aivars Šmaukstelis	(Latvia) Dainis Zageris	(Sweden) Johnny Hansson	19 June 2016
Zlatibor, Serbia SCL Serbia	(Latvia) Aivars Šmaukstelis (2)	(Austria) Martin Wildauer	(Slovenia) Matjaz Belsak	2 July 2016
Plovdiv, Bulgaria SCL Bulgaria	(Bulgaria) Stoyan Todorchev	(Slovenia) Matjaz Belsak	(Latvia) Dainis Zageris	24 July 2016
Guildford, England SCL England	(United States) Eric Dawson	(Austria) Martin Wildauer	(Poland) Mateusz Baron	13 August 2016
Vaasa, Finland SCL Finland	(Canada) Simon Boudreau	(Latvia) Aivars Šmaukstelis	(Estonia) Lauri Nämi	21 August 2016
Sibiu, Romania SCL Romania	(Poland) Mateusz Baron	(Netherlands) Alex Moonen	(Austria) Martin Wildauer	17 September 2016
Willemstad, Curaçao SCL Curaçao	(Canada) Jimmy Paquet	(Latvia) Dainis Zageris	(Netherlands) Alex Moonen	1 October 2016
Porto, Portugal SCL Portugal	(Latvia) Dainis Zageris (4)	(Poland) Krzysztof Radzikowski	(Spain) Roberto Rodriguez	9 October 2016
Dubai, United Arab Emirates SCL 2016 World Finals	(Latvia) Dainis Zageris (5)	(Poland) Krzysztof Radzikowski	(Slovenia) Matjaz Belsak	5 November 2016

=== 2017 ===
Name and Location	Champion	Runner-Up	Runner-Up	Date
Vinstra, Norway SCL World's Strongest Viking	(Canada) Jean-François Caron (3)	(Poland) Krzysztof Radzikowski	(United States) Luke Herrick	29 January 2017
Cologne, Germany SCL FIBO	(Slovenia) Matjaz Belsak	(United Kingdom) Tom Stoltman	(Germany) Dennis Kohlruss	8 April 2017
Lichtenvoorde, Netherlands SCL Holland	(Slovenia) Matjaz Belsak (2)	(Poland) Grzegorz Szymański	(Netherlands) Alex Moonen	17 June 2017
Zlatibor, Serbia SCL Serbia	(Slovenia) Matjaz Belsak (3)	(United States) Kevin Faires	(Latvia) Aivars Šmaukstelis	22 July 2017
Saint-Hyacinthe, Canada SCL Canada	(Canada) Jean-François Caron (4)	(Slovenia) Matjaz Belsak	(Canada) Jimmy Paquet	28 July 2017
Vaasa, Finland SCL Finland	(Slovenia) Matjaz Belsak (4)	(Latvia) Dainis Zageris	(Poland) Krzysztof Radzikowski	20 August 2017
Sibiu, Romania SCL Romania	(Latvia) Aivars Šmaukstelis (3)	(United Kingdom) Phil Roberts	(Moldova) Sucman Radion	16 September 2017
Willemstad, Curaçao SCL Curaçao	(Latvia) Dainis Zageris (6)	(United States) Kevin Faires	(United States) Luke Herrick	8 October 2017
Corinth, Greece SCL Greece	(Latvia) Dainis Zageris (7)	(Poland) Krzysztof Radzikowski	(Germany) Dennis Kohlruss	11 November 2017
Chetumal, Mexico SCL 2017 World Finals	(Slovenia) Matjaz Belsak (5)	(Canada) Jean-François Caron	(Latvia) Dainis Zageris	25 November 2017

=== 2018 ===
Name and Location	Champion	Runner-Up	Runner-Up	Date
Vinstra, Norway SCL World's Strongest Viking	(Poland) Krzysztof Radzikowski (13)	(Germany) Dennis Kohlruss	(United States) Luke Herrick	28 January 2018
Cologne, Germany SCL FIBO	(Poland) Krzysztof Radzikowski (14)	(Latvia) Dainis Zageris	(Germany) Sebastian Kraus	14 April 2018
Abu Dhabi, United Arab Emirates SCL Abu Dhabi	(Slovenia) Matjaz Belsak (6)	(Latvia) Dainis Zageris	(Iran) Mohammed Azatpouri	12 May 2018
Doetinchem, Netherlands SCL Holland	(Latvia) Dainis Zageris (8)	(United States) Alex Moonen	(Germany) Dennis Kohlruss	2 June 2018
Merikarvia, Finland SCL Finland	(Slovenia) Matjaz Belsak (7)	(Latvia) Aivars Šmaukstelis	(Finland) Jarno Kirselä	16 June 2018
Zlatibor, Serbia SCL Serbia	(Slovenia) Matjaz Belsak (8)	(United States) Travis Ortmayer	(Latvia) Aivars Šmaukstelis	14 July 2018
Brașov, Romania SCL Romania	(Latvia) Aivars Šmaukstelis (4)	(Poland) Krzysztof Radzikowski	(United States) Travis Ortmayer	7 September 2018
Willemstad, Curaçao SCL Curaçao	(Latvia) Dainis Zageris (9)	(Estonia) Marko Remlik	(Netherlands) Alex Moonen	13 October 2018
Cancún, Mexico SCL 2018 World Finals	(Latvia) Dainis Zageris (10)	(Poland) Krzysztof Radzikowski	(Latvia) Aivars Šmaukstelis	11 November 2018

=== 2019 ===
Name and Location	Champion	Runner-Up	Runner-Up	Date
Vinstra, Norway SCL World's Strongest Viking	(Poland) Krzysztof Radzikowski (15)	(Norway) Ole Martin Kristiansen	(Finland) Mika Törrö	26 January 2019
Cologne, Germany SCL FIBO	(Poland) Krzysztof Radzikowski (16)	(Latvia) Aivars Šmaukstelis	(Germany) Sebastian Kraus	6 April 2019
Alanya, Turkey SCL Turkey	(United States) Travis Ortmayer	(Germany) Dennis Kohlruss	(Netherlands) Alex Moonen	20 April 2019
Ulft, Netherlands SCL Holland	(Netherlands) Alex Moonen	(Netherlands) Kelvin de Ruiter	(Finland) Mika Törrö	5 June 2019
Petrozavodsk, Russia SCL Russia	(Latvia) Aivars Šmaukstelis (5)	(Russia) Dmitrii Skosyrskii	(Netherlands) Kelvin de Ruiter	20 July 2019
Inđija, Serbia SCL Serbia	(Estonia) Marko Remlik	(Poland) Sebastian Kurek	(Netherlands) Kelvin de Ruiter	28 July 2019
Joensuu, Finland SCL Finland	(Poland) Mateusz Kieliszkowski	(Latvia) Aivars Šmaukstelis	(Estonia) Marko Remlik	4 August 2019
Esposende, Portugal SCL Portugal	(Ukraine) Oleg Sylka	(Poland) Sebastian Kurek	(United Kingdom) Will Baggott	10 August 2019
Pyhäjärvi, Finland SCL World Record Breakers	(Latvia) Dainis Zageris (11)	(Latvia) Aivars Šmaukstelis	(Finland) Antti Mourujärvi	7 September 2019
Willemstad, Curaçao SCL Curaçao	(Netherlands) Kelvin de Ruiter	(Latvia) Dainis Zageris	(Estonia) Ervin Toots	5 October 2019
Dubai, United Arab Emirates World's Ultimate Strongman	(Poland) Mateusz Kieliszkowski (2)	(United Kingdom) Tom Stoltman	(United Kingdom) Luke Stoltman	25 October 2019
Matosinhos, Portugal SCL 2019 World Finals	(Latvia) Aivars Šmaukstelis (6)	(Estonia) Marko Remlik	(Latvia) Dainis Zageris	17 November 2019

=== 2020 ===
Name and Location	Champion	Runner-Up	Runner-Up	Date
Vinstra, Norway SCL World's Strongest Viking	(Republic of Ireland) Sean O'Hagan	(Latvia) Aivars Šmaukstelis	(Finland) Mika Törrö	25 January 2020
Joensuu, Finland SCL Finland	(Latvia) Dainis Zageris (12)	(Latvia) Aivars Šmaukstelis	(Estonia) Ervin Toots	1 August 2020
Kenzingen, Germany SCL World Record Breakers	(Germany) Dennis Kohlruss	(Netherlands) Kelvin de Ruiter	(Estonia) Ervin Toots	26 September 2020

=== 2021 ===
Name and Location	Champion	Runner-Up	Runner-Up	Date
Vinstra, Norway SCL Norway	(Latvia) Dainis Zageris (13)	(Netherlands) Kelvin de Ruiter	(Norway) Henrik Hildeskor	24 July 2021
Esposende, Portugal SCL Portugal	(United States) Travis Ortmayer	(Estonia) Ervin Toots	(Netherlands) Kelvin de Ruiter	8 August 2021
Kenzingen, Germany SCL World Record Breakers	(Latvia) Dainis Zageris (14)	(Netherlands) Kelvin de Ruiter	(Sweden) Johan Espenkrona	28 August 2021
Sibiu, Romania SCL Romania	(Latvia) Aivars Šmaukstelis (7)	(Republic of Ireland) Sean O'Hagan	(Denmark) Anders Aslak	2 October 2021
Alanya, Turkey SCL 2021 World Finals	(Netherlands) Kelvin de Ruiter (2)	(Latvia) Aivars Šmaukstelis	(Finland) Mika Törrö	14 November 2021

=== 2022 ===
Name and Location	Champion	Runner-Up	Runner-Up	Date
Vaasa, Finland SCL World Record Breakers	(Latvia) Aivars Šmaukstelis (8)	(Estonia) Ervin Toots	(Netherlands) Kelvin de Ruiter	23 April 2022
Doetinchem, Netherlands SCL Holland	(Netherlands) Kelvin de Ruiter (3)	(Spain) Roberto Rodriguez	(Wales) Gavin Bilton	18 June 2022
Kikinda, Serbia SCL Serbia	(Finland) Sami Ahola	(Hungary) Péter Juhász	(Netherlands) Kelvin de Ruiter	23 July 2022
Esposende, Portugal SCL Portugal	(Netherlands) George Sulaiman	(Estonia) Ervin Toots	(Poland) Sebastian Kurek	6 August 2022
Gloucester, England SCL England	(Latvia) Aivars Šmaukstelis (9)	(England) Paul Smith	(Wales) Gavin Bilton	20 August 2022
Sopot, Poland SCL Poland	(Poland) Oskar Ziółkowski	(Latvia) Aivars Šmaukstelis	(Poland) Maciej Hirsz	27 August 2022
Sarajevo, Bosnia and Herzegovina SCL Bosnia	(Latvia) Dainis Zageris (15)	(Australia) Rongo Keene	(Spain) Roberto Rodríguez	3 September 2022
Sibiu, Romania SCL Romania	(Netherlands) Kelvin de Ruiter (4)	(Finland) Mika Törrö	(United Kingdom) Kane Francis	17 September 2022
Gibraltar SCL Gibraltar	(Latvia) Aivars Šmaukstelis (10)	(United Kingdom) Kane Francis	(Spain) Roberto Rodríguez	30 September 2022
Alanya, Turkey SCL 2022 World Finals	(Latvia) Aivars Šmaukstelis (11)	(Estonia) Ervin Toots	(United Kingdom) Kane Francis	6 November 2022

=== 2023 ===
Name and Location	Champion	Runner-Up	Runner-Up	Date
Vaasa, Finland SCL Finland	(United States) Nathan Goltry	(Italy) Andrea Invernizzi	(Latvia) Aivars Šmaukstelis	6 May 2023
Zrenjanin, Serbia SCL Serbia	(Wales) Gavin Bilton	(Turkey) Fatih Karaca	(Netherlands) Kelvin de Ruiter	20 May 2023
Netherlands Ulft, Netherlands SCL Holland	Aivars Šmaukstelis (12)	(Netherlands) Kelvin de Ruiter	(Netherlands) Kevin Hazeleger	17 June 2023
Joensuu, Finland SCL World Record Breakers	(Latvia) Aivars Šmaukstelis (13)	(Finland) Mika Törrö	(United Kingdom) Kane Francis	30 July 2023
Esposende, Portugal SCL Portugal	(Ghana) Evans Aryee	(United Kingdom) Kane Francis	(Wales) Gavin Bilton	5 August 2023
Gloucester, England SCL England	(United Kingdom) Shane Flowers	(Scotland) Louis Jack	(United Kingdom) Kane Francis	12 August 2023
Hämeenlinna, Finland SCL World's Strongest Viking	(United Kingdom) Kane Francis	(Estonia) Ervin Toots	(Iceland) Sigfús Fossdal	18 August 2023
Sopot, Poland SCL Poland	(Netherlands) Kevin Hazeleger	(Poland) Oskar Ziółkowski	(Poland) Adam Roszkowski	26 August 2023
Limassol, Cyprus SCL Cyprus	(Ukraine) Pavlo Kordiyaka	(United Kingdom) Kane Francis	(Ghana) Evans Aryee	7 October 2023
Sarajevo, Bosnia and Herzegovina SCL 2023 World Finals	(Poland) Oskar Ziółkowski (2)	(Latvia) Aivars Šmaukstelis	(Netherlands) Kevin Hazeleger	18 November 2023

=== 2024 ===
Name and Location	Champion	Runner-Up	Runner-Up	Date
Joensuu, Finland SCL Iceman	(Latvia) Aivars Šmaukstelis (14)	(United States) Nick Wortham	(United Kingdom) Kane Francis	24–25 February 2024
Fort-de-France, Martinique SCL Martinique	(Canada) Tristain Hoath	(Netherlands) Kelvin de Ruiter	(Germany) Dennis Kohlruss	6–7 April 2024
Budapest, Hungary SCL Hungary	(Poland) Adam Roszkowski	(Canada) Frederick Rheaume	(Hungary) Peter Juhasz	27 April 2024
Zrenjanin, Serbia SCL Serbia	(United Kingdom) Kane Francis (2)	(Turkey) Fatih Karaca	(Ghana) Evans Aryee	25 May 2024
's-Heerenberg, Netherlands SCL Holland	Rayno Nel	Aivars Šmaukstelis	(Netherlands) George Sulaiman	22 June 2024
Joensuu, Finland SCL World Record Breakers	Aivars Šmaukstelis (15)	(Finland) Mika Törrö	(Ghana) Evans Aryee	29 June 2024
Tartu, Estonia SCL Estonia	(Poland) Adam Roszkowski (2)	(United Kingdom) Kane Francis	(Hungary) Peter Juhasz	20 July 2024
Esposende, Portugal SCL Portugal	(Ghana) Evans Aryee (2)	(Italy) Andrea Invernizzi	(France) Alexandre Hulin	3 August 2024
Gdansk, Poland SCL Poland	(Italy) Andrea Invernizzi	(Hungary) Peter Juhasz	(Poland) Oskar Ziółkowski	24 August 2024
Dubai, United Arab Emirates SCL Dubai	(Iceland) Hafþór Júlíus Björnsson (9)	(Ghana) Evans Aryee	(Netherlands) George Sulaiman	7–8 September 2024
Limassol, Cyprus SCL Cyprus	(Poland) Adam Roszkowski (3)	(Hungary) Peter Juhasz	(United Kingdom) Kane Francis	12 October 2024
Cape Town, South Africa SCL Africa	(South Africa) Rayno Nel (2)	(Ghana) Evans Aryee	(Poland) Adam Roszkowski	2–3 November 2024
Antalya, Turkey SCL World Finals	(South Africa) Rayno Nel (3)	(Ghana) Evans Aryee	(Latvia) Aivars Šmaukstelis	8–9 November 2024

=== 2025 ===
Name and Location	Champion	Runner-Up	Runner-Up	Date
Joensuu, Finland SCL Iceman	(United States) Brian Kichton	(Netherlands) Kevin Hazeleger	(Germany) Patrick Eibel	21-22 February 2025
Riga, Latvia SCL Latvia	(Latvia) Aivars Šmaukstelis (16)	(Lithuania) Audrius Jokubaitis	(Germany) Patrick Eibel	3 May 2025
Zrenjanin, Serbia SCL Serbia	(Ghana) Evans Aryee (3)	(Latvia) Aivars Šmaukstelis	(Hungary) Peter Juhasz	24 May 2025
Crema, Italy SCL Italy	(South Africa) Rayno Nel (4)	(Poland) Adam Roszkowski	(United States) Brian Kichton	7 June 2025
Doetinchem, Netherlands SCL Netherlands	(South Africa) Rayno Nel (5)	(Netherlands) Kevin Hazeleger	(Poland) Adam Roszkowski	14 June 2025
Joensuu, Finland SCL Finland - World's Strongest Viking	(Poland) Adam Roszkowski (4)	(Netherlands) Kevin Hazeleger	(Sweden) Jesper Hansson	28 June 2025
Esposende, Portugal SCL Portugal - World's Strongest Latino	(Italy) Andrea Invernizzi (2)	(Argentina) Gianluca Ardenghi	(France) Alexandre Hulin	2 August 2025
Farnborough, England SCL England - World Truck Pull Championship	(Germany) Patrick Eibel	(Netherlands) Kevin Hazeleger	(Ghana) Evans Aryee	16-17 August 2025
Gdańsk, Poland SCL Poland	(United Kingdom) Graham Hicks	(Poland) Oskar Ziółkowski	(Ghana) Evans Aryee	23 August 2025
Siófok, Hungary SCL Hungary	(Hungary) Peter Juhasz	(Ghana) Evans Aryee	(Latvia) Aivars Šmaukstelis	6 September 2025
(United States) Sandusky, Ohio, USA SCL USA	(Canada) Tristain Hoath (2)	(United States) Nick Wortham	(Canada) Wesley Derwinsky	20 September 2025
Dubai, United Arab Emirates SCL Dubai	(Latvia) Aivars Šmaukstelis (17)	(Poland) Adam Roszkowski	(Iran) Ramin Farajnejad	18 October 2025
Upington, South Africa SCL World Finals	(South Africa) Rayno Nel (6)	(Netherlands) Kevin Hazeleger	(Poland) Adam Roszkowski	15-16 November 2025

=== 2026 ===
Name and Location	Champion	Runner-Up	Runner-Up	Date
Joensuu, Finland SCL Iceman	Jaco Schoonwinkel	Brian Kichton	Kevin Hazeleger	20-21 February 2026
Zrenjanin, Serbia SCL Serbia	(Germany) Patrick Eibel (2)	(Ghana) Evans Aryee	(Hungary) Peter Juhasz	23 May 2026
Liberec, Czech Republic SCL Czech Republic - Swaglift	(Ukraine) Oleh Pylypiak	(Ghana) Evans Aryee	(Poland) Adam Roszkowski	30 May 2026
Winterswijk, Netherlands SCL Holland	(United Kingdom) Luke Richardson	(Poland) Adam Roszkowski	(Ghana) Evans Aryee	21 June 2026
Melegnano, Italy SCL Italy	(Ghana) Evans Aryee (4)	(Czech Republic) Jan Lacina	(Poland) Adam Roszkowski	25 July 2026
Irvinestown, Northern Ireland SCL Ireland	(Germany) Patrick Eibel (3)	(Ghana) Evans Aryee	(Republic of Ireland) Sean Gillen	1 August 2026
Niechorze, Poland SCL Poland	(Ukraine) Pavlo Kordiyaka (2)	(Poland) Oskar Ziółkowski	(Hungary) Peter Juhasz	15 August 2026
Finland SCL Finland - World's Strongest Viking	(Poland) Adam Roszkowski (5)	(Hungary) Peter Juhasz	(Sweden) Jesper Hansson	22 August 2026
(United States) USA SCL Ohio	(Canada) Andrew Langelaar	Austin Hamm	(Germany) Patrick Eibel	5-6 September 2026
Portugal SCL Portugal - Maia PowerExpo	(Poland) Adam Roszkowski (6)	Kevin Hazeleger	(Argentina) Gianluca Ardenghi	3-4 October 2026
(United States) USA SCL Florida	(Canada) Andrew Langelaar (2)	(Canada) Tristain Hoath	Austin Hamm	10 October 2026
Turkey SCL Turkiye	(Canada) Tristain Hoath (3)	Austin Hamm	(United Kingdom) Luke Richardson	31 October 2026
South Africa SCL World Finals	(South Africa) Rayno Nel (7)	(Ghana) Evans Aryee	Kevin Hazeleger	14-15 November 2026

== SCL North American Championships ==
In 2012, SCL announced the first ever SCL North American Championships to be held in Warwick, Quebec from 5–8 July 2012. The contest took place over 4 days and consisted of 10 events, with athletes from USA and Canada, with 5 athletes from each country. The event was organized by SCL in association with the Festival Hommes Forts-Warwick along with co-organizer Jean Fréchette. The event also featured an amateur, semi-pro and a strongwoman competition.

=== 2012 ===
Dates: 5–8 July 2012 Warwick, Quebec

Position	Name	Nationality	Points
1	Louis-Philippe Jean	Canada	81
2	Christian Savoie	Canada	76
3	Nick Best	United States	73
4	Dave Ostlund	United States	57.5
5	Adam Scherr	United States	57.5
6	Jacki Ouellet	Canada	54
7	Paul Vaillancourt	Canada	42.5
8	Steve Schmidt	United States	42
9	Simon Boudreau	Canada	37.5
10	Joel Dircks	United States	27

=== 2013 ===
Dates: 5–7 July 2013 Warwick, Quebec

Position	Name	Nationality	Points
1	Mike Burke	United States	89
2	Louis-Phillipe Jean	Canada	87
3	Christian Savoie	Canada	73
4	Jason Bergmann	United States	67
5	Karl Gillingham	United States	54
6	Luke Skaarup	Canada	53
7	Paul Vaillancourt	Canada	44
8	Steve Schmidt	United States	41
9	Maxime Boudreault	Canada	35
10	Joel Dircks	United States	31
11	Scott Cummine	Canada	28
12	Dale Schumaker	United States	17

=== 2014 ===
Dates: 4–6 July 2014 Warwick, Quebec

Position	Name	Nationality	Points
1	Brian Shaw	United States	85.5
2	Jean-François Caron	Canada	74
3	Jason Bergmann	United States	61
4	Luke Skaarup	Canada	54.5
5	Josh Thigpen	United States	54
6	Ben Ruckstuhl	Canada	52
7	Nick Best	United States	51
8	Paul Vaillancourt	Canada	45.5
9	Dimitar Savatinov	United States	44.5
10	Maxime Boudreault	Canada	43
11	Dale Schumaker	United States	20
12	Christian Savoie	Canada	18 (injured)

== FIBO ==
FIBO (abbreviation for fitness and bodybuilding) is the world’s leading trade fair for fitness, wellness and health in Cologne, with more than 1,105 exhibitors and over 145,000 visitors, held in annually. FIBO was founded in 1985 by Kurt Thelen and Volker Ebener. On 10. May 1990 it was sold to Blenheim International Deutschland GmbH, a predecessor of today’s Reed Exhibitions Deutschland GmbH.
