= Agris Kazeļņiks =

Latvian strongman

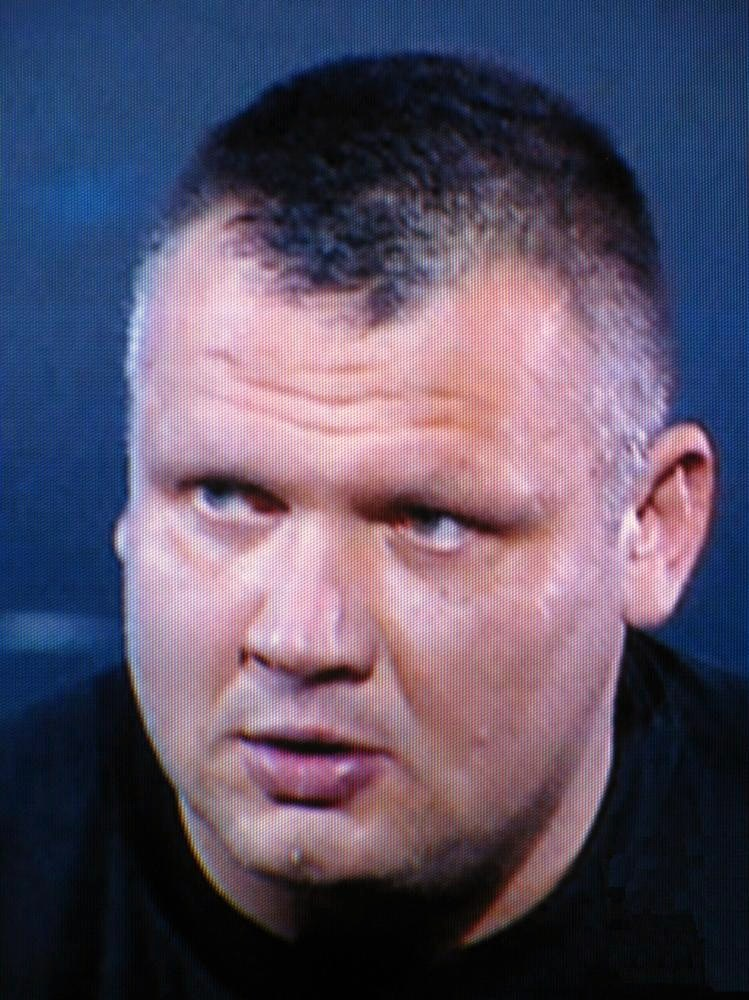

Personal information
- Born: 24 July 1973 (age 52) Ogre, Latvia
- Occupation: Strongman
- Height: 189 cm (6 ft 2 1/2 in)
Medal record
Strongman
Representing Latvia
World's Strongest Man
Qualified	2009 World's Strongest Man
Qualified	2010 World's Strongest Man
Latvia's Strongest Man
1st	2006
1st	2007
1st	2008
IFSA European Championships
9th	2006
Strongman Champions League
3rd	2008 Latvia
4th	2008 Serbia
7th	2008 Netherlands
5th	2008 Bulgaria
6th	2008 Lithuania
4th	2008 Romania
6th	2008 Finland
3rd	2008 Overall
6th	2009 Serbia
4th	2009 Slovakia
2nd	2009 Netherlands
5th	2009 England
5th	2009 Hungary
3rd	2009 Ukraine
2nd	2009 Overall
3rd	2010 Ireland
2nd	2010 Serbia
2nd	2010 Ukraine

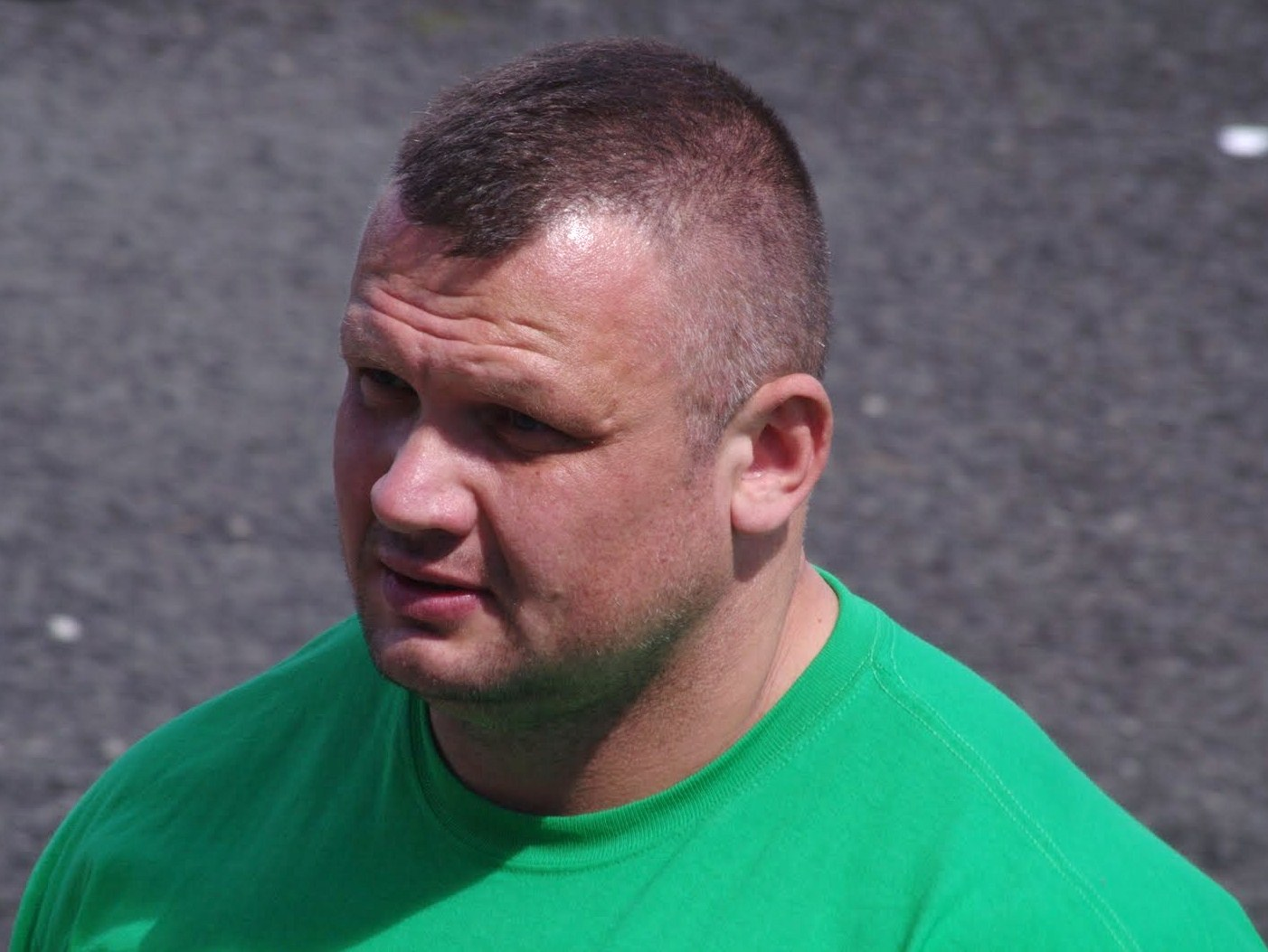
During the Strongman Champions League event in Limerick, Ireland in 2010.

Agris Kazeļņiks (born 24 July 1973) is a strongman competitor from Ogre, Latvia. Agris is a 3 time Latvia's Strongest Man and frequent competitor in the Strongman Champions League. Agris finished 3rd overall in the 2008 season of Strongman Champions League, and 2nd place overall in the 2009 season.

== Personal records ==
- Viking press – 220 kg (485 lb) (2007 IFSA Holland Grand Prix) (Joint-World Record)
