= Mikhail Koklyaev =

Russian weightlifter (born 1978)

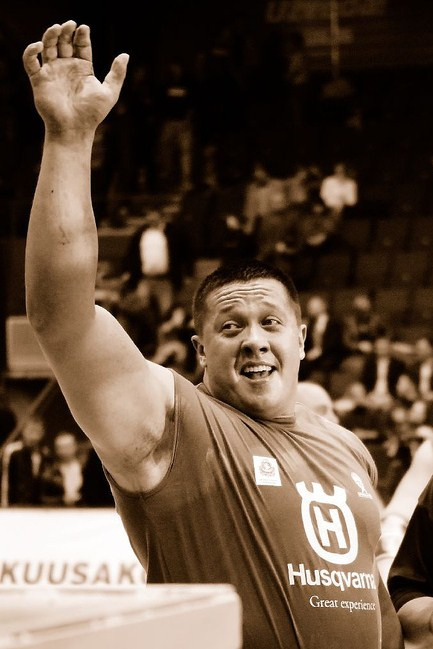
- Koklyaev in 2007

Personal information
- Nickname: "Misha"
- Born: 17 December 1978 (age 47) Chelyabinsk, Russian SFSR, Soviet Union
- Occupation(s): Strongman, Powerlifting, Olympic weightlifting
- Height: 6 ft 4 in (193 cm)
- Weight: 160 kg (353 lb)
- Spouse: Oxana Koklyaeva
Medal record
Strongman
Representing Russia
World's Strongest Man
3rd	2010 World's Strongest Man
Qualified	2012 World's Strongest Man
10th	2013 World's Strongest Man
Arnold Strongman Classic
3rd	2006 Arnold Strongman Classic
5th	2007 Arnold Strongman Classic
3rd	2008 Arnold Strongman Classic
2nd	2009 Arnold Strongman Classic
4th	2010 Arnold Strongman Classic
5th	2011 Arnold Strongman Classic
6th	2012 Arnold Strongman Classic
3rd	2013 Arnold Strongman Classic
Giants Live
5th	2009 Mohegan Sun
3rd	2009 Norway
2nd	2010 South Africa
5th	2012 Poland
Strongman Champions League
1st	2008 Finland
1st	2009 Serbia
1st	2009 Netherlands
1st	2010 Germany FIBO
1st	2010 Finland
2nd	2010 Netherlands
3rd	2010 Ukraine SCL Finals
3rd	2010 Overall
2nd	2012 Finland
1st	2012 Poland
1st	2012 Russia
2nd	2012 Martinique SCL Finals
3rd	2012 Overall
Fortissimus
6th	2008 Fortissimus
5th	2009 Fortissimus
Arnold Strongman Classic-Europe
4th	2012 Arnold Strongman Classic-Europe
IFSA Strongman World Championships
3rd	2005 IFSA Strongman World Championships
2nd	2006 IFSA Strongman World Championships
2nd	2007 IFSA Strongman World Championships
IFSA World Open
1st	2005 IFSA World Open
World's Strongest Team
3rd	2005 Team World (IFSA)
2nd	2007 Team Russia (IFSA)
World Log Lift Championships
2nd	2008 World Log Lift Championships

Mikhail Koklyaev
Medal record
Representing Russia
Powerlifting
WPC Raw European Championships
1st	2012 WPC Raw European Championships	+125 kg
Champions Battle Raw Deadlift Challenge
2nd	2010 Champions Battle Raw Deadlift Challenge	160 kg

Mikhail Viktorovich Koklyaev (Russian: Михаил Викторович Кокляев, born 17 December 1978) is a Russian weightlifter, powerlifter, strongman and boxer. He is widely regarded as one of the most versatile strength athletes of all time.

== Strongman ==
Koklyaev has placed third place at the Arnold Strongman Classic in 2006, 2008 and 2013, as well as second in 2009. He was a medalist of all three IFSA World Championships, finishing third in 2005, second in 2006 and second in 2007.

Koklyaev came in second place (with Igor Pedan) at the IFSA Strongman World 2-Man Championship, in Vilnius, Lithuania in 2007. He finished third at the 2010 World's Strongest Man contest, but failed to make the finals for the 2012 World's Strongest Man. Koklyaev qualified for the 2013 World's Strongest Man finals, but had to withdraw due to an earlier injury after the first event. He is a 7-time Strongman Champions League grand prix winner, and finished third overall for both the 2010 and 2012 SCL seasons.

Having competed in 50 International strongman competitions and winning 11 of them, Koklyaev is among the 20 most decorated strongmen of all time.

== Powerlifting and weightlifting ==
On 20 December 2008, Mikhail totalled 2,149 lbs at a raw powerlifting meet in Chelyabinsk, Russia with a 360 kg (790 lb) squat, 210 kg (460 lb) bench press, and a 405 kg (893 lb) deadlift.

Mikhail won the +125 kg class in the 2012 WPC Raw European Championships on 26 April 2012 with a 340 kg (750 lb) squat, 225 kg (496 lb) bench press, and a 400 kg (880 lb) deadlift.

On 16 December 2012, at the Chelyabinsk region championship, Mikhail had a raw squat of 360 kg (793 lbs), raw bench of 230 kg (507 lbs), and raw deadlift of 417.5 kg (920 lbs), making his raw total 1007.5 kg (2,221 lbs). His deadlift during this championship remains the heaviest raw deadlift ever performed using a stiff bar.

On Sunday 8 March at the 2009 Arnold Strongman Classic, Mikhail became only the second man in history to clean and jerk the famous 501 lb barbell used by Vasily Alekseyev in 1970.

== Personal records ==
=== Weightlifting ===
- Snatch: 210 kg (463 lb) (2003 Russian Championships)

→ Mikhail has also snatched 110 kg (243 lb) with one hand in 2008.

- Clean and Jerk: 250 kg (551 lb) (2005 Russian Cup)
- Total: 450 kg (992 lb) (210 + 240 kg (463 + 529 lb)) (2003 Russian Championships

=== Powerlifting ===
- Squat: 360 kg (794 lb) raw without knee wraps (2012 Chelyabinsk Oblast Powerlifting Championships)

→ Mikhail has also squatted 312.5 kg (689 lb) for 9 reps in 2013, front squatted it in 2010, and has also squatted 310 kg (683 lb) with no hands on the bar in 2014.

- Bench Press: 230 kg (507 lb) raw (2012 Chelyabinsk Oblast Powerlifting Championships)

→ Mikhail has also benched 220 kg (485 lb) for 3 reps in 2012.

- Deadlift: 417.5 kg (920 lb) raw (2012 Chelyabinsk Oblast Powerlifting Championships)
- Total: 1,007.5 kg (2,221 lb) (360 + 230 + 417.5 kg (794 + 507 + 920 lb)) (2012 Chelyabinsk Oblast Powerlifting Championships)

→ Mikhail has also totaled 900 kg (1,984 lb) raw (330 + 200 + 370 kg (728 + 441 + 816 lb)) by performing the three lifts back to back within 37 seconds.

=== Combined lifting ===
- Combined official Supertotal (official weightlifting total + official powerlifting total):
  450 kg (992 lb) + 1,007.5 kg (2,221 lb) = 1,457.5 kg (3,213 lb)
- Career aggregate Supertotal (Individual 5 lift PR weightlifting & powerlifting total):
  210 kg (463 lb) + 250 kg (551 lb) + 360 kg (794 lb) + 230 kg (507 lb) + 417.5 kg (920 lb) = 1,467.5 kg (3,235 lb)

=== Strongman ===
- Deadlift – 422.5 kg (931 lb) (2012 Arnold Europe)
- Deadlift (for reps) – 400 kg (882 lb) x 3 reps (during training, 2010), and 342.5 kg (755 lb) x 10 reps (during training, 2012) (former unofficial world record)
- Hummer tyre Deadlift – 461 kg (1,016 lb) (2009 Arnold Strongman Classic)
- Log press – 202.5 kg (446 lb) (2010 World's Strongest Man)
- Axle press – 195 kg (430 lb) (2007 IFSA Strongman World Championships)
- Apollon's Wheels – 166 kg (366 lb) x 7 power cleans and reps (2009 Arnold Strongman Classic) (World Record)

→ Unlike Žydrūnas Savickas and Brian Siders who did 'continental cleans' for their 8 reps, Mikhail performed power cleans, without resting the axle at the stomach.

- Shoulder press – 240 kg (529 lb) (2006 IFSA Russia Grand Prix) (former joint-world record)
- Behind the back barbell overhead jerk – 270 kg (595 lb) (during training, 2012) (unofficial world record)

→ Mikhail has also done a squat + overhead jerk with a barbell with two men on it.

- Rigoulot one hand snatch – 110 kg (243 lb) (during training, 2015)

→ Mikhail has also done 100 kg (220 lb) at 2015 Rogue Record Breakers event.

- Manhood Stone (Max Atlas Stone) – 244 kg (538 lb) over 4 ft bar (2013 Arnold Strongman Classic)
- Atlas Stone (for reps) – 211 kg (465 lb) x 2 reps over 4 ft bar (2009 Arnold Strongman Classic) and 205 kg (452 lb) x 4 reps over 4 ft bar (2011 Arnold Strongman Classic)
- Atlas stones – 130–180 kg (287–397 lb) 5 stones set in 18.81 seconds (2010 Giants Live South Africa)
- Atlas stone to shoulder – 160 kg (353 lb) (during training, 2013)
- Weight over bar – 25 kg (55 lb) over 5.82 metres (19 ft 1 in) (2012) (former unofficial world record)

→ Because this occurred during the 56 versus 55 pound weight discrepancy during 2012–2013, it is not regarded as an official world record. Mikhail's best performance with 25.5 kg (56 lb) is 5.48 metres (18 ft 0 in) during 2010 London Scottish Highland Games.

- Power stairs (3 x 175–275 kg (386–606 lb) duck walks / total of 15 steps) – 35.69 seconds (2006 IFSA Russia Grand Prix) (World Record)
- Arm over arm human ski pull – 8 humans for 13.45 metres (44 ft 2 in) on ice (2010 SCL Finland) (World Record)

== Boxing ==
Upon retiring from professional strength sports, on 29 November 2019 Koklyaev made his debut as a professional boxer. In his first match he lost to Alexander Emelianenko by technical knockout in the first round. In his second match on February 20, 2021, at the Kings of the Ring tournament, Mikhail defeated blogger Artem Tarasov, known by the nickname "Cyclop", by a majority decision in a 4-round match.

== Personal life ==
Koklyaev is married and has two children. He also plays guitar and accordion, and enjoys singing.
