= Robert Szczepański =

Polish strength athlete

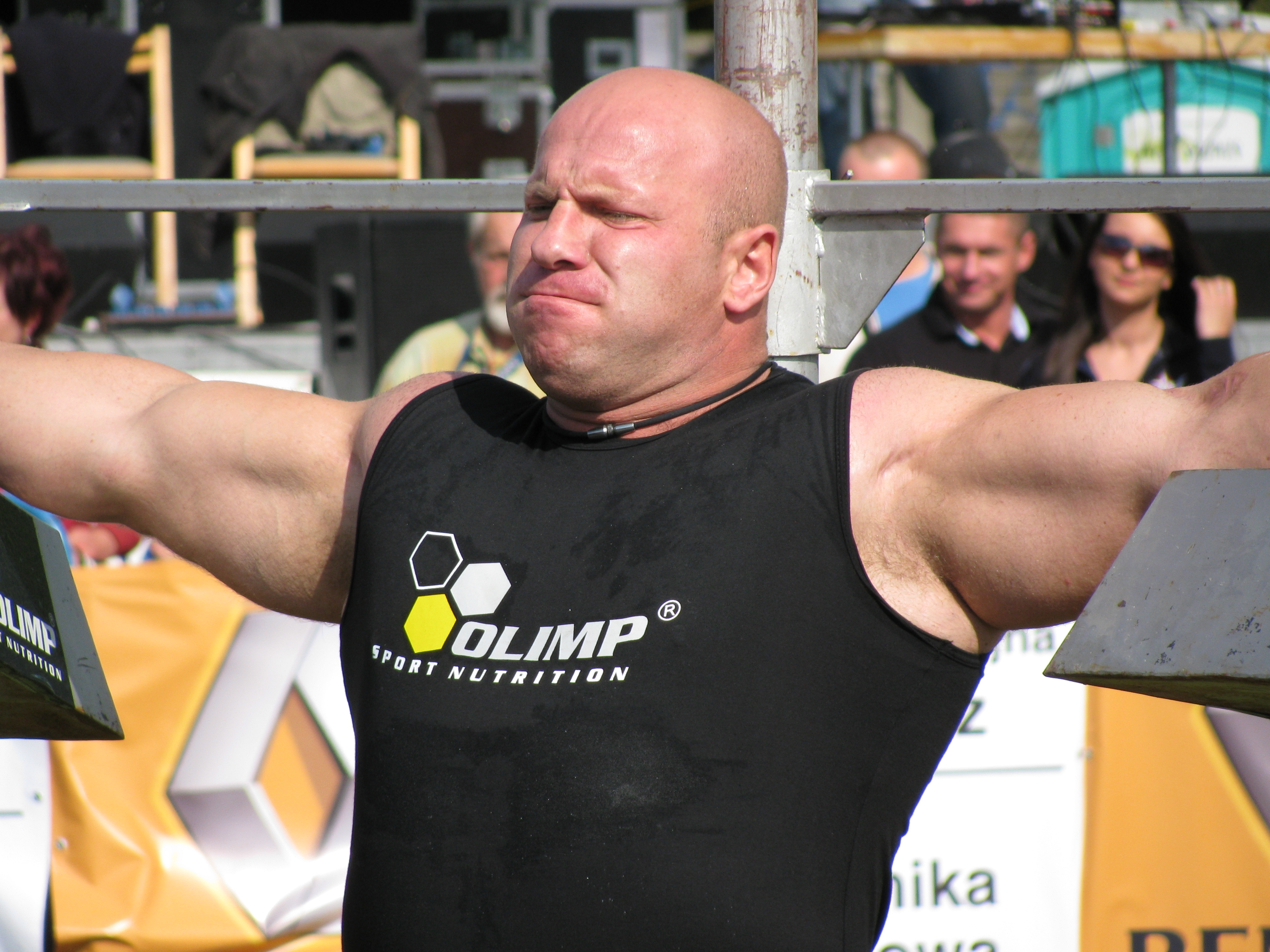

Personal information
- Born: June 1, 1975 (age 51) (Poland)
- Occupation: Strongman
- Height: 1.83 m (6 ft 0 in)
- Spouse: Magda
- Children: Dorian
Medal record
Strongman
Representing Poland
World's Strongest Man
Qualified	2010 World's Strongest Man
IFSA Strongman World Championships
9th	2005
6th	2006
7th	2007
IFSA Strongman European Championships
5th	2005
4th	2007
Giants Live
2nd	Poland 2010
Poland's Strongest Man
1st	2009
All-American Strongman Challenge
6th	2010

Robert Szczepański (born 1 June 1975) is a Polish boxer, powerlifter and strongman competitor. Prior to competing in strongman, Szczepański coached boxing and Powerlifting, and in 1993 he won a bronze medal in boxing at the Polish Junior Championships. Robert began competing in strongman in 2002. He has a wife, Magda, and a son Dorian (named after 6 time Mr. Olympia winner Dorian Yates).

== Personal Records ==
- Squat 360 kg
- Bench Press 280 kg
- Deadlift 390 kg

== Strongman ==
Robert Szczepański competed at the IFSA Strongman World Championships in 2005, 2006 and 2007. Robert finished ninth in 2005, sixth in 2006, and seventh in 2007. He finished fifth in the IFSA Strongman European Championships in 2005, and fourth in 2007. Recently, Robert finished second at the Giants Live Poland event on Aug. 8th, 2010. This second-place finish qualified him for the 2010 World's Strongest Man competition, this will be his first appearance at WSM.

== Achievements ==
- 2002
  - 5th place - Final Polish Strongman Cup 2002
  - 2nd place - Poland vs. Rest of World
- 2003
  - 2nd place - Strongest Man World Cup 2003
  - 2nd place - Final Polish Strongman Cup 2003
  - 1st place - Poland vs. Rest of World
- 2004
  - 1st place - Speedway Polish Strongman ECSS 2004
- 2005
  - 5th place - IFSA Strongman European Championships 2005, Latvia
  - 9th place - IFSA Strongman World Championships 2005, Canada (injured)
- 2006
  - 6th place - IFSA Strongman World Championships 2006 Iceland
- 2007
  - 4th place - IFSA Strongman European Championships 2007, Ukraine
  - 7th place - IFSA Strongman World Championships 2007, South Korea
  - 7th place - World Team Cup 2007 (with Arthur stick), Lithuania
- 2008
  - 1st place - European Cup Harlem's Strongest Man 2008
- 2009
  - 1st place - Harlem Strongman Polish Cup 2009
  - 1st place - Polish Championship Strongman AS 2009
  - 1st place - Polish Strongman Cup Harlem 2009
- 2010
  - 6th place - All-American Strongman Challenge 2010
  - 2nd place - Giants Live Poland
