= Serhiy Romanchuk =

Personal information
- Born: 2 June 1982 (age 44) Makiivka, Donetsk Oblast, Ukrainian SSR
- Height: 6 ft 2 in (188 cm)

Sport
- Sport: Strongman, powerlifting
Medal record
Strongman
Representing Ukraine and Russia
World's Strongest Man
Qualified	2010 World's Strongest Man
Qualified	2011 World's Strongest Man
Arnold Strongman Classic
9th	2011 Arnold Strongman Classic
Giants Live
9th	2010 Ukraine
1st	2011 Ukraine
8th	2013 Hungary
Europe's Strongest Man
6th	2010 Europe's Strongest Man
Strongman Champions League
9th	2009 Ukraine
1st	2010 Ukraine
6th	2011 Serbia
10th	2011 Finland
Globe's Strongest Man
8th	2010 Globe's Strongest Man
4th	2011 Globe's Strongest Man
Russia's Strongest Man
4th	2019 Russia's Strongest Man
Ukraine's Strongest Man
8th	2009 Ukraine's Strongest Man
2nd	2014 Ukraine's Strongest Man
Powerlifting
Representing Ukraine
UPO Ukrainian National Powerlifting Championships
1st	2007	+140kg
1st	2012	140kg
UPF Ukrainian Powerlifting Championships
2nd	2005	125kg
EPF Junior European Championships
3rd	2005	125kg
UPF Junior Ukrainian Championships
3rd	2003	125kg
2nd	2005	125kg

Serhiy Romanchuk (Ukrainian: Сергій Романчук; Russian: Сергей Романчук; born 6 June 1982) is a Ukrainian-born professional strongman competitor and national champion powerlifter. He has competed in the 2010 World's Strongest Man and 2010 Europe's Strongest Man contests. On Dec. 18, 2010 he won the Strongman Champions League event in Kyiv, Ukraine.

Romanchuk won the Giants Live Ukraine event in Poltava, Ukraine on Aug. 25, 2011. This victory qualified him for the 2011 World's Strongest Man contest. During 2011 Arnold Strongman Classic competition he loaded a 243 kg (536 lb) Manhood Stone (Max Atlas Stone) over a 4 ft bar.

He is a 2 time UPO Ukrainian National Powerlifting Champion in 2007 & 2012.

Following the 2014 Russian aggression against Ukraine, Romanchuk stayed in Makiivka where he heads a local sports club "Medvedi" (Bears).

== See also ==
- Strongman Champions League
- IFSA
- Alexey Vishnitsky
- Vasyl Virastyuk
