= Belgium's Strongest Man =

Sports Competition

Tournament information
- Location: Belgium
- Established: 2008
- Format: Multi-event competition

Current champion
- (Belgium) Mike De Clerck (2026)

Belgium's Strongest Man (Dutch: Sterkste Man van België) is an annual strongman competition held in Belgium and featuring exclusively Belgian athletes. The contest was established in 2008. Jimmy Laureys holds the record for most wins with 6 wins.

It is a multi event competition that tests competitors in a number of different fields.

== Champions breakdown ==
Year	Champion	Runner-up	3rd place
2008	(Belgium) Jimmy Laureys	(Belgium) Simon De Vogelaere	(Belgium) Jeffrey Phlips
2009	(Belgium) Jimmy Laureys	(Belgium) Simon De Vogelaere	(Belgium) Karel Van Hulsel
2010	(Belgium) Jimmy Laureys	(Belgium) Karel Van Hulsel	(Belgium) Didier Van Hamme
2011	(Belgium) Jimmy Laureys	(Belgium) David De vos	(Belgium) Michael Dubois
2012	(Belgium) Jimmy Laureys	(Belgium) Karel Van Hulsel	(Belgium) Raf Bensch
2013	(Belgium) Jimmy Laureys	(To be confirmed)	(To be confirmed)
2014-2022	(To be confirmed)	(To be confirmed)	(To be confirmed)
2023	(Belgium) Dominic Mattijs	(To be confirmed)	(To be confirmed)
2025	(Belgium) Sascha Nijs	(Belgium) Stijn Van Bogaert	(Belgium) Michael Simons
2026	(Belgium) Mike De Clerck	(Belgium) Stijn Van Bogaert	(Belgium) Kevin Tancré
