= Kostyantyn Ilin =

Ukrainian strongman

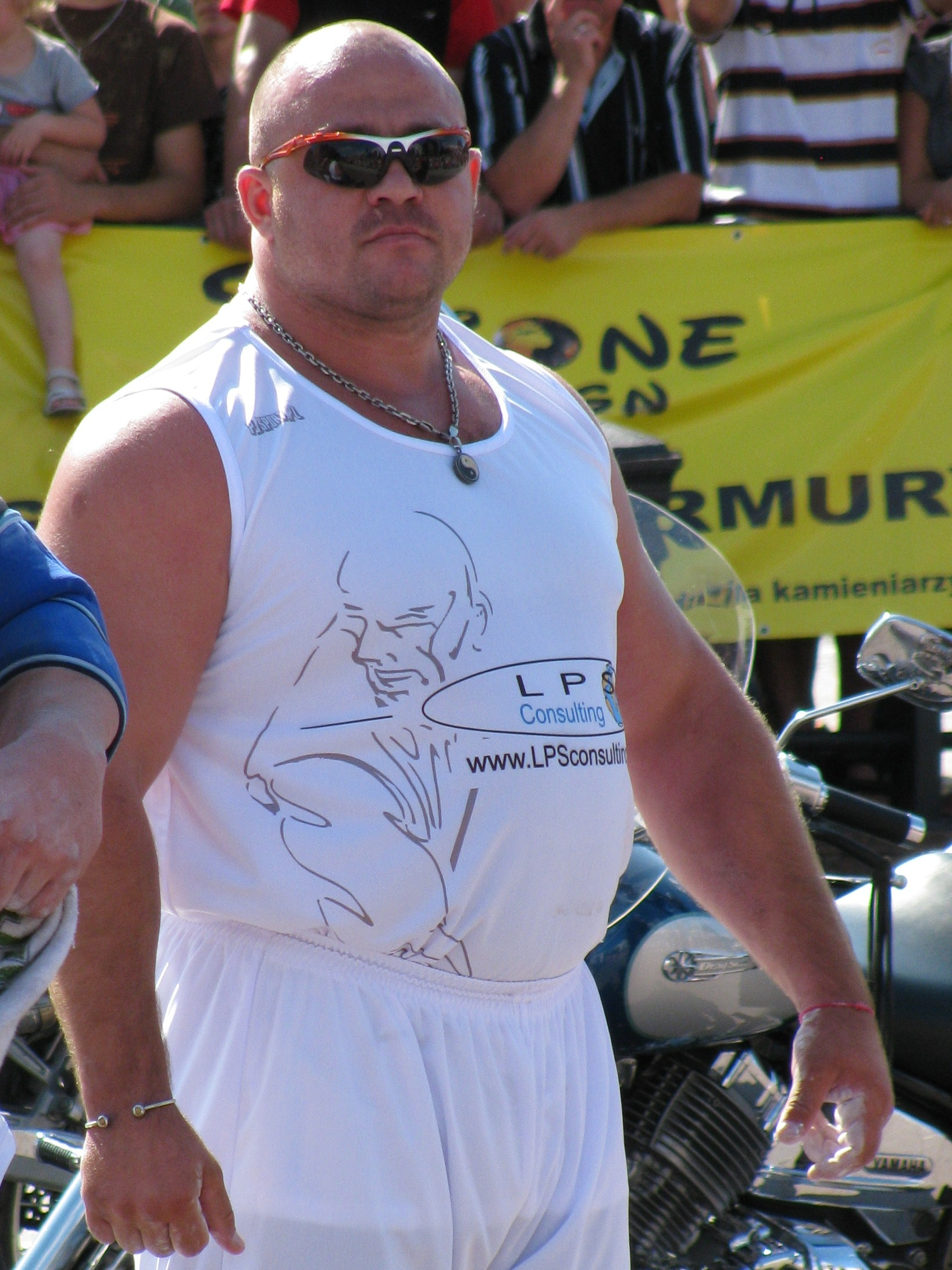

Personal information
- Native name: Костянтин Ільїн
- Born: 26 March 1975 (age 51) Chernivtsi, Ukraine
- Occupation(s): Strongman, powerlifting
- Height: 6 ft 3.5 in (1.92 m)
Medal record
Strongman
Representing Ukraine
World's Strongest Man
Qualified	2009 World's Strongest Man
Qualified	2010 World's Strongest Man
Arnold Strongman Classic
8th	2010
Strongman Champions League
5th	Strongman Champions League 2009: Slovakia
6th	Strongman Champions League 2009: England
9th	Strongman Champions League 2009: Hungary
4th	Strongman Champions League 2009: Ukraine
8th	Strongman Champions League 2009 Overall
3rd	Strongman Champions League 2010: Lapland
8th	Strongman Champions League 2010: Finland
9th	Strongman Champions League 2010: Holland
3rd	Strongman Champions League 2010: Slovakia
4th	Strongman Champions League 2010: Ukraine
Ukraine's Strongest Man
8th	2007
2nd	2008
1st	2009
1st	2014
Powerlifting
Representing Ukraine
UPF Ukrainian Powerlifting Cup
7th	2003	125kg

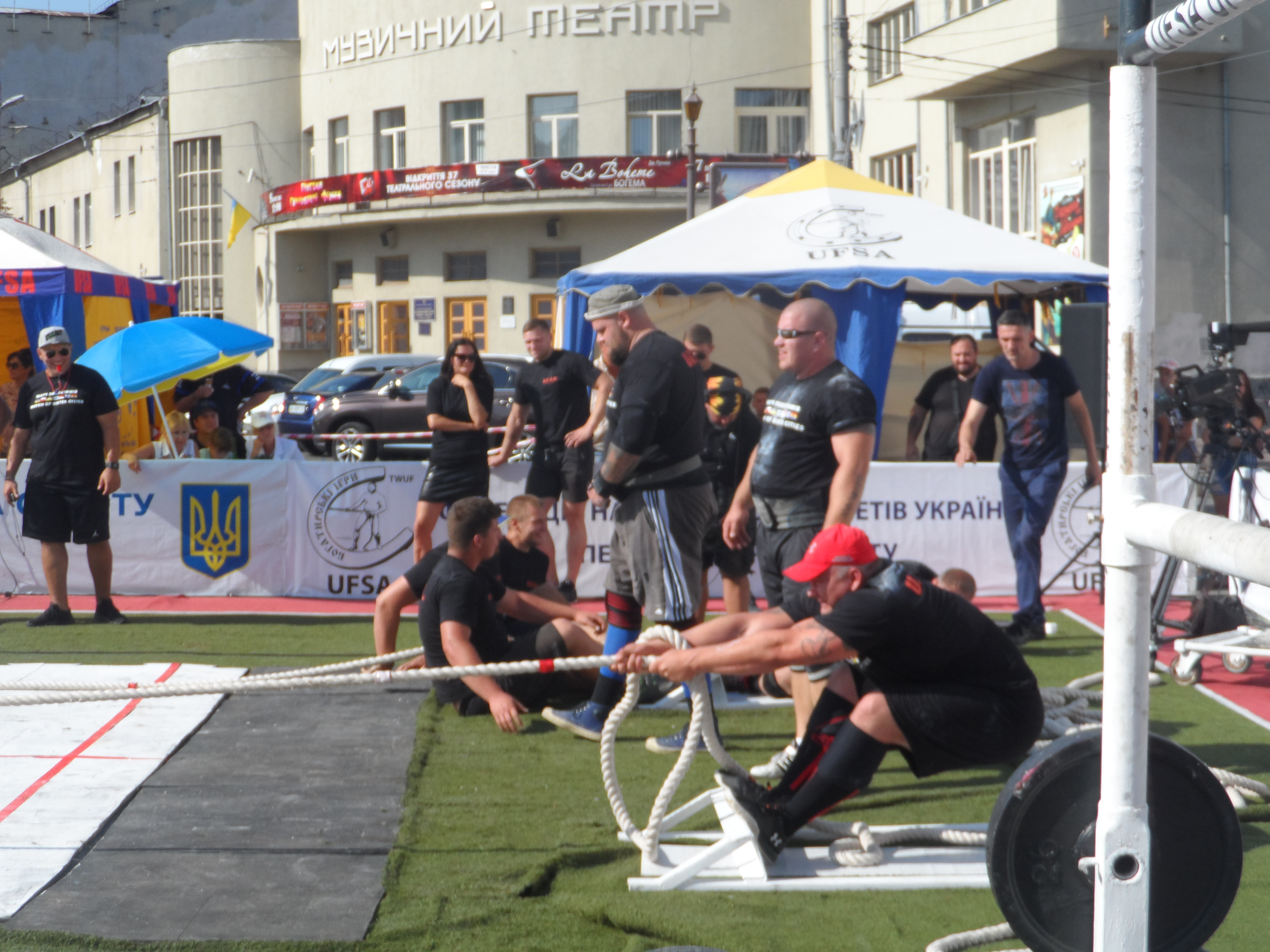

Kostyantyn Ilin (Ukrainian: Костянтин Ільїн; born 26 March 1975) is a leading Ukrainian strongman competitor and entrant to the World's Strongest Man. Having competed in 54 International strongman competitions, he has won 8 of them, making him one of the 50 most decorated strongman in history.

== Biography ==
Born in Chernivtsi, Ukraine, Ilin took to strongman competition relatively late at the age of 30. Within four years, he was his country's national champion, winning the 2009 Ukraine's Strongest Man contest.

In 2009, he continued to impress and was invited to the 2009 World's Strongest Man in a field described as the best ever. He did not make the final in a group whose top two were Derek Poundstone and Louis-Philippe Jean.

Ilin qualified for the 2010 World's Strongest Man but was again unable to qualify for the finals.

Ilin broke Derek Poundstone's world record in the 95 kg (209 lb) circus dumbbell with 10 repetitions during the Strongman Champions League event in Kyiv, Ukraine on 18 December 2010.

== Personal records ==
- Bench press: 220 kg
- Squat: 380 kg
- Deadlift: 385 kg
