= Jason Bergmann (strongman) =

American strength athlete

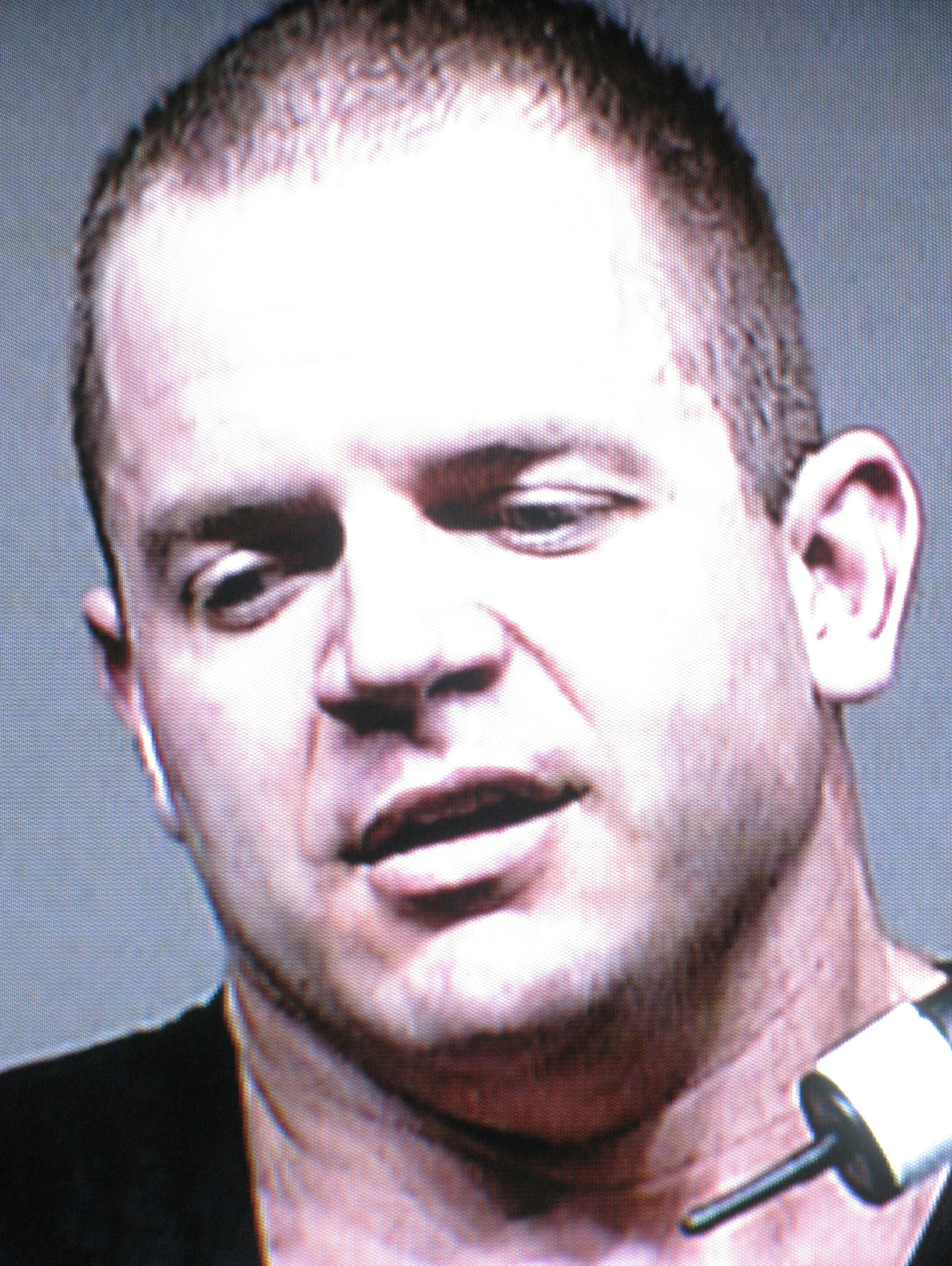

Personal information
- Born: Jason Bergmann; March 13, 1978 (age 48) Appleton, Wisconsin, United States
- Occupation: Strongman
- Height: 5 ft 11 in (1.80 m)
Medal record
Strongman
Representing United States
World's Strongest Man
9th	2008 World's Strongest Man
10th	2010 World's Strongest Man
Strongman Super Series
3rd	2009 Los Angeles Grand Prix
3rd	2009 Gothenburg Grand Prix
All-American Strongman Challenge
3rd	2008
America's Strongest Man
2nd	2008

Jason Bergmann (born March 13, 1978) is an American strongman competitor and entrant to the World's Strongest Man competition on multiple occasions.

== Career ==
Jason Bergmann came to international attention with a third-place finish in the All-American Strongman Challenge 2007. He then became a leading competitor on the Strongman Super Series circuit and in 2008 came second in the America's Strongest Man competition. Having then been invited to the 2008 World's Strongest Man he made the final ten (coming ninth overall). Strong finishes in the Strongman Super Series grands prix in Venice Beach and Gothenburg were followed by a period of injury. In 2010 he began competing again and once again made the final ten of the prestigious 2010 World's Strongest Man, having made the final on both occasions he had competed at the premier strongman competition.

=== Competition record ===
- 2006
  - 9. - All-American Strongman Challenge 2006
- 2007
  - 3. - All-American Strongman Challenge 2007
  - 4. - Super Series 2007: Mohegan Sun
- 2008
  - 5. - Super Series 2008: Mohegan Sun
  - 4. - All-American Strongman Challenge 2008
  - 2. - America's Strongest Man 2008
  - 9. - World's Strongest Man 2008
  - 2. - Poland vs USA team event
- 2009
  - 3. - Super Series 2009: Venice Beach
  - 3. - Super Series 2009: Göteborg
- 2010
  - 10. - World's Strongest Man 2010

== Personal Records ==
- Atlas Stone to shoulder – 140 kg (309 lb) x 9 reps/ bouncing technique (2014 Giants Live Hungary) (World Record)
- Rock machine Squat – 345 kg (761 lb) x 12 reps (within 75 seconds) (2010 World's Strongest Man, group 5)
