= Ervin Katona =

Hungarian strongman (born 1977)

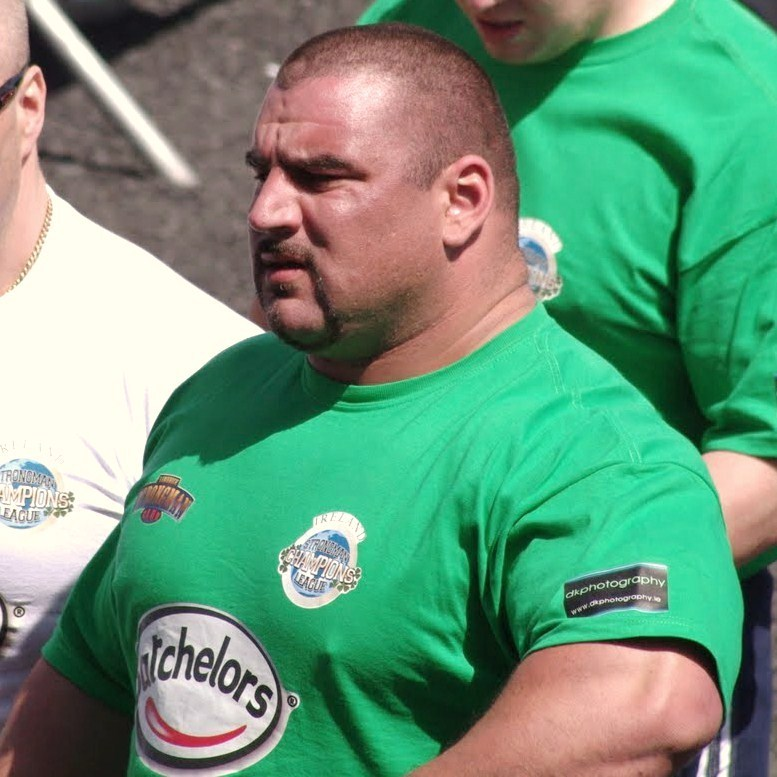
- Katona in 2010

Personal information
- Nationality: Hungarian, Serbian
- Born: Ervin Katona; 5 January 1977 (age 49) Subotica, SFR Yugoslavia
- Occupation: Strongman
- Height: 1.85 m (6 ft 1 in)
- Weight: 145–150 kg (320–331 lb)
Medal record
Strongman
Representing Serbia
World's Strongest Man
Qualified	2009 World's Strongest Man
7th	2010 World's Strongest Man
10th	2011 World's Strongest Man
10th	2012 World's Strongest Man
IFSA Strongman World Championships
10th	2006
10th	2007
Arnold Strongman Classic
8th	2009
Strongman Champions League
2nd	SCL 2008: Serbia
4th	SCL 2008: Holland
3rd	SCL 2008: Bulgaria
5th	SCL 2008: Lithuania
2nd	SCL 2008: Romania
3rd	SCL 2008: Finland
2nd	2008 Overall
4th	SCL 2009: Serbia
1st	SCL 2009: Spain
1st	SCL 2010: Bulgaria
3rd	SCL 2010: Holland
1st	SCL 2010: Serbia
1st	SCL 2010: Slovakia
2nd	2010 Overall
3rd	SCL 2011: SCL Iceman Challenge II
1st	SCL 2011: Serbia
3rd	SCL 2011: Finland
2nd	SCL 2011: Holland
1st	SCL 2011: Bulgaria
1st	SCL 2011: Canary Islands
4th	SCL 2011: Canada SCL Semi-finals
3rd	SCL 2012: Sarajevo SCL Finals
1st	2011/2012 Overall
5th	SCL 2012: SCL Iceman Challenge III
3rd	SCL 2012: Germany FIBO
1st	SCL 2012: Serbia
3rd	SCL 2013/2013 Overall
World Log Lift Championships
5th	2008
4th	2009
5th	2011
Serbia's Strongest Man
1st	2006
1st	2007
1st	2008

Ervin Katona (Serbian Cyrillic: Ервин Катона; born 5 January 1977) is a Serbian-born Hungarian strongman competitor and regular entrant to the World's Strongest Man competition. He has competed in 117 International strongman competitions (second highest in history) and have won 23 of them, making him the seventh most decorated strongman in history.

== Biography ==
Ervin Katona was a junior national kickboxing Glory champion in his youth. He later moved into the field of Strength athletics, and started weight training at the age of 25. He had soon won a number of Balkan titles and became the winner of the Serbia's Strongest Man title.

Katona became a member of the International Federation of Strength Athletes and following the latter's schism with World's Strongest Man could not compete in that event. He did compete, however, in the IFSA version in both 2006 and 2007. In 2008 he was a major figure on the Strongman Champions League circuit and consistent podium finishes earned him the overall runner-up spot behind his great friend Žydrūnas Savickas. In early 2009 in the Strongman Champions League event in his hometown Katona suffered a torn biceps. Despite this, Katona was able to recover in time to compete in the prestigious 2009 World's Strongest Man event in Malta, he was unable to qualify for the finals. In 2010, Katona was able to qualify for the World's Strongest Man finals and finished in 7th place. Katona also won 3 Strongman Champions League events in Bulgaria, Serbia and Slovakia in 2010. Katona finished second overall for the 2010 SCL season behind Terry Hollands.

Katona owns a gym in his home town of Subotica, which he cites as his greatest personal achievement. He entered in Big Brother VIP 2010 house and finished in fifth place after 28 days. Katona set a Guinness World Record on 25 April 2009 for longest time to restrain a vehicle weighing 980 kg (2,156 lbs) in Milan, Italy. His time was 1 minute 2 seconds.

Katona won the Strongman Champions League overall title for the 2011–2012 season, he had previously finished in 2nd overall in 2008 and 2010.

== Personal records ==
- Squat – 400 kg (882 lb)
- Bench press – 300 kg (661 lb) (equipped)
- Deadlift – 400 kg (882 lb)
- Log press – 195 kg (430 lb)
- Weight over bar – 25 kg (55 lb) over 5.40 metres (17 ft 9 in) (2009 SCL Serbia)
- Frame carry (with straps) – 360 kg (794 lb) 40m course in 23.26 seconds (2012 SCL Serbia) (World Record)
- Atlas Stone – 211 kg (465 lb) over 4 ft bar (2009 Arnold Strongman Classic)
- Front hold – 30 kg (66 lb) for 75.82 seconds (2013 SCL Slovakia) (World Record)
- Arm Over Arm Truck pull – 18,000 kg (39,683 lb) for 20 meters - 41.96 seconds (2013 SCL Serbia) (former world Record)
- Firetruck pull – 20,000 kg (44,092 lb) for 25 meters - 41.38 seconds (2013 SCL World Truck Pull Championships)
- Truck pull – 21,000 kg (46,297 lb) for 20 meter course 'uphill' in 43.65 seconds (2014 SCL Martinique) (World Record)

== Competition record ==
- 2004
  - 7. – Europe's Strongest Man 2004
- 2006
  - 3. – World Strongman Cup Federation 2006: Vienna
  - 12. – IFSA Strongman World Championships 2006, Reykjavík, Iceland
- 2007
  - 3. – Europe's Strongest Team 2007
  - 6. – Europe's Strongest Man (IFSA) 2007
  - 3. – European Strongman Team Cup 2007
  - 11. – IFSA Strongman World Championships 2007, Geumsan, South Korea
- 2008
  - 2. – Strongman Champions League 2008: Serbia
  - 1. – Europe's Strongest Team 2008
  - 4. – Strongman Champions League 2008: Holland
  - 3. – Strongman Champions League 2008: Bulgaria
  - 12. – Fortissimus, Canada
  - 5. – Strongman Champions League 2008: Lithuania
  - 2. – European Strongman Cup KBI 2008
  - 2. – Strongman Champions League 2008: Romania
  - 3. – Strongman Champions League 2008: Finland
  - 5. – World Log Lift Championships 2008, Vilnius, Lithuania
- 2009
  - 8. – Arnold Strongman Classic, Columbus, Ohio USA
  - 4. – Strongman Champions League 2009: Serbia (injured)
  - 1. – Strongman Champions League 2009: Spain
  - 4. – World Log Lift Championships 2009, Vilnius, Lithuania
- 2010
  - 1. – Strongman Champions League 2010: Bulgaria
  - 3. – Strongman Champions League 2010: Holland
  - 1. – Strongman Champions League 2010: Serbia
  - 7. – 2010 World's Strongest Man, Sun City, South Africa
  - 1. – Strongman Champions League 2010: Slovakia
- 2011
  - 5. – World Log Lift Championships 2011, Vilnius, Lithuania
  - 3. – Strongman Champions League 2011: SCL Iceman Challenge
  - 1. – Strongman Champions League 2011: Serbia
