= Grzegorz Szymański =

Polish volleyball player (born 1978)

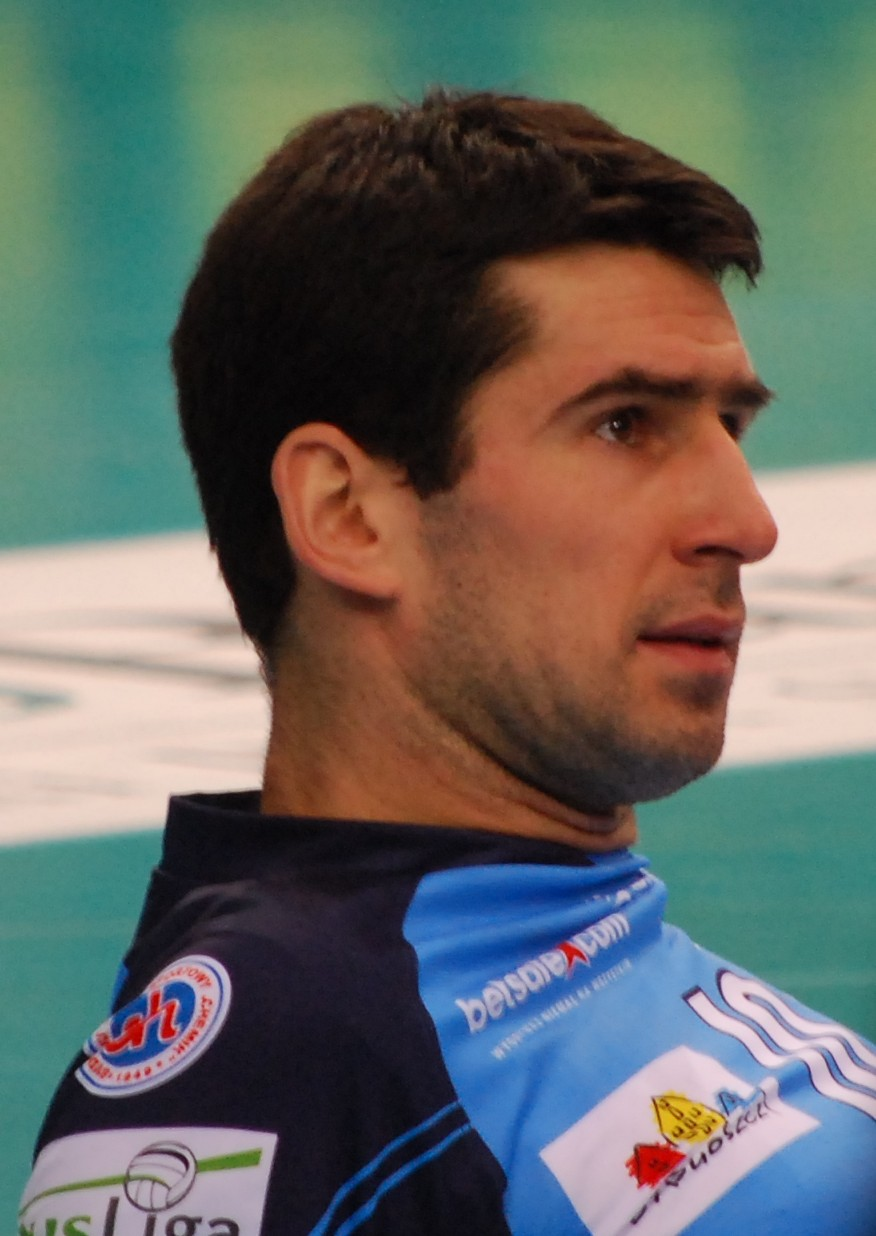

Personal information
- Full name: Grzegorz Szymański
- Nickname: Gelu
- Nationality: Polish
- Born: July 12, 1978 (age 48); Ostrowiec Świętokrzyski, Poland
- Height: 2.02 m (6 ft 8 in)
- Weight: 94 kg (207 lb)
- Spike: 345 cm (136 in)
- Block: 315 cm (124 in)

Volleyball information
- Position: Opposite hitter
- Number: 10

Career
Years	Teams
1994–1997; 1997–2000; 2000–2005; 2005–2007; 2007–2009; 2009–2011; 2011–2013; 2013–2015	Ostrovia Ostrowiec Świętokrzyski; Płomień Sosnowiec; AZS Częstochowa; Jastrzębski Węgiel; Indykpol AZS Olsztyn; Delecta Bydgoszcz; AZS Politechnika Warszawska; Indykpol AZS Olsztyn

National team
1998–2007	Poland
Honours
Representing Poland
Men's volleyball
World Championship
Silver medal – second place	2006 Japan
- Last updated: 6 February 2017

Grzegorz Szymański (born 12 July 1978) is a Polish volleyball player, a member of Poland men's national volleyball team from 1998 to 2007, and a silver medalist of the World Championship 2006.

== Personal life ==
Szymański was born in Ostrowiec Świętokrzyski, Poland. He is married to Magdalena. They have a daughter Oliwia and a son Arkadiusz.

== Career ==
=== Clubs ===
He began to play with Ostrovia Ostrowiec Swiętokrzyski, when he was 16. After that, he started playing in Sosnowiec. In 2000 he went to AZS Częstochowa, where he spent 5 years. With AZS he won second and third place in Polska Liga Siatkówki. His next club was Jastrzębski Węgiel, where he won second place in PlusLiga. He has been playing for Indykpol AZS Olsztyn since 2013.

== Sporting achievements ==
=== National team ===
- 1995 CEV U19 European Championship
- 1997 FIVB U21 World Championship
- 2006 FIVB World Championship

=== State awards ===
- 2006 Gold Cross of Merit
