= Sean O'Hagan (strongman) =

Irish strongman

Personal information
- Nationality: Irish
- Born: 1990 (age 34–35); Banbridge, County Down
- Height: 6 ft 11.5 in (212 cm)
- Weight: 194 kg (428 lb)

Sean Eamon O'Hagan (born 1990) is an Irish professional strongman. At 6 ft 11.5 in (2.12 m), he is the tallest active professional strongman and among the tallest in history. His weight of around 190–200 kg (420–440 lb) also makes him one of the heaviest strongmen alive.

== Early life ==
O'Hagan comes from the small village of Loughbrickland in County Down. He played Gaelic football until age 16, mainly as a full forward as his height made him an aerial target. He began weightlifting when he was 20.

== Strongman career ==
O'Hagan's first major success was becoming Ulster's Strongman Man in 2014, aged 24, the competition's youngest winner to date. He won Ireland's Strongest Man in 2015.

In 2016, O'Hagan began competing in an international strongman competition, finishing 31st in the Strongman world rankings. In 2017, he qualified for the Strongman Champions League World Finals in Mexico. After 18 matches in various locations across the globe, with his best finish being 4th, he finished 9th in the world final and jumped to 20th strongest man in the world rankings with 71 points.

O'Hagan won the 2020 World's Strongest Viking competition in Fefor, Norway.

=== Personal records ===
- Mini-bus pull (Harness only/ no rope) – 2,550 kg (5,622 lb) for 30 meter course 'uphill' in 22.49 seconds (2016 SCL Finland) (World Record)
