= 2008–09 snooker season =

Details
- Duration: 4 June 2008 – 10 May 2009
- Tournaments: 34 (8 ranking events)

Triple Crown winners
- UK Championship: (England) Shaun Murphy
- Masters: (England) Ronnie O'Sullivan
- World Championship: (Scotland) John Higgins

The 2008–09 snooker season was a series of snooker tournaments played between 4 June 2008 and 10 May 2009. Four players missed the fourth ranking event of the season, the Bahrain Championship, and therefore lost ranking points; this was due to a clash with some Premier League matches whose date had already been approved by the game's governing body.

== New professional players ==
Countries

- China
- England
- India
- Ireland
- Netherlands
- New Zealand
- Northern Ireland
- Scotland
- Thailand
- Wales

Note: new means in these case, that these players were not on the 2007/2008 professional Main Tour.

International champions:

1. IBSF World Snooker Championship winner: (Thailand) Atthasit Mahitthi
2. IBSF World Under-21 Snooker Championship winner: (England) Michael Georgiou
3. EBSA European Snooker Championships winner: (England) David Grace
4. EBSA International Play Off winner: (Netherlands) Stefan Mazrocis
5. EBSA European Under-19 Snooker Championships winner: (England) Stephen Craigie
6. ACBS Asian Snooker Championship winner: (China) Jin Long
7. ACBS Asian Under-21 Snooker Championship winner: (China) Li Hang
8. Oceania Championship runner-up: (New Zealand) Chris McBreen

NGB nominations

9. English nomination 1: (Note: Wayne Cooper qualified by topping the Pro Ticket Tour rankings.) (England) Wayne Cooper
10. English nomination 2: (Note: Andy Lee qualified by winning the Pro Ticket Tour Play Offs.) (England) Andy Lee
11. Welsh nomination: (Note: Andrew Pagett qualified by topping the Welsh rankings.) (Wales) Andrew Pagett
12. Scottish nomination: (Note: Robert Stephen qualified by topping the Scottish rankings.) (Scotland) Robert Stephen
13. Irish nomination: (Note: Vincent Muldoon qualified by topping the Irish rankings.) (Republic of Ireland) Vincent Muldoon
14. Northern Irish nomination: (Note: Declan Hughes qualified by topping the Northern Irish rankings.) (Northern Ireland) Declan Hughes
15. ACBS Asian Nomination: (India) Aditya Mehta

From PIOS Tour

16. (England) Kuldesh Johal
17. (England) Peter Lines
18. (Wales) Jamie Jones
19. (England) Simon Bedford
20. (Wales) Daniel Wells
21. (England) Lewis Roberts
22. (England) Matthew Couch
23. (England) Paul Davison

== Calendar ==
The following table outlines the results and dates for all the ranking and major invitational events.

=== World Snooker Tour ===
Start	Finish	Country	Tournament name	Venue	City	Winner	Runner-up	Score	Ref.
4 Jun	8 Jun	CHN	Jiangsu Classic	Nanjing Olympic Sports Center Gymnasium	Nanjing Wuxi	(China) Ding Junhui	(England) Mark Selby	6–5	
8 Jul	13 Jul	THA	Six-red Snooker International	Montien Riverside Hotel	Bangkok	(England) Ricky Walden	(England) Stuart Bingham	8–3	
24 Aug	31 Aug	NIR	Northern Ireland Trophy	Waterfront Hall	Belfast	(England) Ronnie O'Sullivan	(England) Dave Harold	9–3	
29 Sep	5 Oct	CHN	Shanghai Masters	Shanghai Grand Stage	Shanghai	(England) Ricky Walden	(England) Ronnie O'Sullivan	10–8	
11 Oct	18 Oct	SCO	Grand Prix	S.E.C.C.	Glasgow	(Scotland) John Higgins	(Wales) Ryan Day	9–7	
8 Nov	15 Nov	BHR	Bahrain Championship	Bahrain International Exhibition Centre	Manama	(Australia) Neil Robertson	(Wales) Matthew Stevens	9–7	
21 Nov	26 Nov	ENG	Masters Qualifying Event	English Institute of Sport	Sheffield	(England) Judd Trump	(England) Mark Joyce	6–1	
11 Sep	7 Dec	ENG	Premier League	Potters Leisure Resort	Hopton-on-Sea	(England) Ronnie O'Sullivan	(England) Mark Selby	7–2	
13 Dec	21 Dec	ENG	UK Championship	Telford International Centre	Telford	(England) Shaun Murphy	(Hong Kong) Marco Fu	10–9	
11 Jan	18 Jan	ENG	Masters	Wembley Arena	London	(England) Ronnie O'Sullivan	(England) Mark Selby	10–8	
16 Feb	22 Feb	WAL	Welsh Open	Newport Centre	Newport	(England) Ali Carter	(Northern Ireland) Joe Swail	9–5	
5 Jan	26 Mar	ENG	Championship League	Crondon Park Golf Club	Stock	(England) Judd Trump	(England) Mark Selby	3–2	
30 Mar	5 Apr	CHN	China Open	Beijing University Students' Gymnasium	Beijing	(England) Peter Ebdon	(Scotland) John Higgins	10–8	
18 Apr	4 May	ENG	World Snooker Championship	Crucible Theatre	Sheffield	(Scotland) John Higgins	(England) Shaun Murphy	18–9	

Ranking event
Non-ranking event

=== World Ladies Billiards and Snooker Association ===
Start	Finish	Country	Tournament name	Venue	City	Winner	Runner-up	Score	Ref.
13 Sep	13 Sep	ENG	Wytech Masters	North East Derbyshire Snooker Centre	Chesterfield	(England) Reanne Evans	(England) Katie Henrick	3–2	
14 Sep	14 Sep	ENG	UK Ladies Championship	North East Derbyshire Snooker Centre	Chesterfield	(England) Reanne Evans	(England) Maria Catalano	3–1	
11 Oct	11 Oct	ENG	East Anglian Championship	Cambridge Snooker Centre	Cambridge	(England) Reanne Evans	(England) Maria Catalano	3–0	
15 Nov	15 Nov	ENG	British Open	Newmarket Snooker & Bowl	Newmarket	(England) Emma Bonney	(England) June Banks	3–1	
7 Feb	7 Feb	ENG	South Coast Classic	Q Ball Snooker Club	Eastbourne	(England) Reanne Evans	(England) Maria Catalano	3–0	
7 Mar	7 Mar	ENG	Connie Gough Memorial	Rileys Snooker Club	Luton	(England) Reanne Evans	(England) Katie Henrick	3–1	
4 Apr	8 Apr	ENG	World Ladies Championship	Cambridge Snooker Centre	Cambridge	(England) Reanne Evans	(England) Maria Catalano	5–2	

=== Pontin's International Open Series ===
Start	Finish	Country	Tournament name	Venue	City	Winner	Runner-up	Score	Ref.
23 Jun	27 Jun	WAL	PIOS I	Pontin's	Prestatyn	(Belgium) Bjorn Haneveer	(England) Andrew Atkinson	6–2	
3 Aug	8 Aug	WAL	PIOS II	Pontin's	Prestatyn	(China) Xiao Guodong	(Thailand) Noppadol Sangnil	6–5	
25 Aug	29 Aug	WAL	PIOS III	Pontin's	Prestatyn	(Pakistan) Shokat Ali	(Wales) Michael White	6–3	
19 Oct	24 Oct	WAL	PIOS IV	Pontin's	Prestatyn	(England) Craig Steadman	(England) Mike Hallett	6–1	
9 Nov	14 Nov	WAL	PIOS V	Pontin's	Prestatyn	(England) Chris Norbury	(England) Alfie Burden	6–2	
27 Feb	4 Mar	WAL	PIOS VI	Pontin's	Prestatyn	(China) Xiao Guodong	(England) Jack Lisowski	6–0	
25 Mar	29 Mar	WAL	PIOS VII	Pontin's	Prestatyn	(Thailand) Thepchaiya Un-Nooh	(England) Lee Page	6–3	
5 May	9 May	WAL	PIOS VIII	Pontin's	Prestatyn	(England) Joe Jogia	(England) Ben Woollaston	6–5	

=== Other events ===
Start	Finish	Country	Tournament name	Venue	City	Winner	Runner-up	Score	Ref.
21 Jun	22 Jun	JEY	World Series of Snooker Jersey	Fort Regent	Saint Helier	(Scotland) John Higgins	(England) Mark Selby	6–3	
12 Jul	13 Jul	GER	World Series of Snooker Berlin	Tempodrom	Berlin	(Scotland) Graeme Dott	(England) Shaun Murphy	6–1	
27 Jul	3 Aug	ENG	Paul Hunter English Open	Northern Snooker Centre	Leeds	(China) Xiao Guodong	(England) Ben Woollaston	6–2	
2 Aug	3 Aug	IRL	Irish Classic	Celbridge Snooker Club	Kildare	(Republic of Ireland) Ken Doherty	(Republic of Ireland) Fergal O'Brien	5–2	
28 Aug	31 Aug	GER	Paul Hunter Classic	Stadthall	Fürth	(England) Shaun Murphy	(England) Mark Selby	4–0	
19 Sep	21 Sep	BEL	Belgian Open	Sportcentrum De Pollepel	Duffel	(England) Ricky Walden	(Scotland) Graeme Dott	4–0	
23 Oct	26 Oct	AUT	Austrian Open	BRP-Rotax-Halle	Wels	(Wales) Ryan Day	(England) Jamie Cope	6–3	
25 Oct	26 Oct	POL	World Series of Snooker Warsaw	EXPO XXI	Warsaw	(China) Ding Junhui	(Republic of Ireland) Ken Doherty	6–4	
22 Nov	23 Nov	RUS	World Series of Snooker Moscow	Krilya Sovetov Sports Arena	Moscow	(Scotland) John Higgins	(China) Ding Junhui	5–0	
20 Dec	21 Dec	NED	Dutch Open	De Dieze	's-Hertogenbosch	(England) Stuart Bingham	(Northern Ireland) Joe Swail	6–3	
9 Jan	10 Jan	WAL	Pontin's Pro Am Series	Pontin's	Prestatyn	(England) Jamie Cope	(England) Craig Steadman	4–1	
8 May	10 May	POR	World Series of Snooker Grand Final	Pavilhão Arena	Portimão	(England) Shaun Murphy	(Scotland) John Higgins	6–2	

== Official rankings ==
The top 16 of the world rankings, these players automatically played in the final rounds of the world ranking events and were invited for the Masters.

No.	Ch.	Player	Points 2006/07	Points 2007/08	Total
1	▲	(England) Ronnie O'Sullivan	20750	29700	50450
2	▲	(Scotland) Stephen Maguire	19550	25975	45525
3	Steady	(England) Shaun Murphy	21350	23700	45050
4	▲	(England) Mark Selby	18275	20050	38325
5	▼	(Scotland) John Higgins	23100	14825	37925
6	▲	(Scotland) Stephen Hendry	17375	16900	34275
7	▲	(England) Ali Carter	15750	18425	34175
8	▲	(Wales) Ryan Day	14450	19425	33875
9	▼	(England) Peter Ebdon	18000	14975	32975
10	▼	(Australia) Neil Robertson	20550	12400	32950
11	▼	(China) Ding Junhui	16325	15869	32194
12	▲	(England) Joe Perry	12175	18250	30425
13	▼	(Scotland) Graeme Dott	18675	8469	27144
14	▲	(Hong Kong) Marco Fu	8925	18075	27000
15	▲	(England) Mark King	12325	13675	26000
16	▲	(Northern Ireland) Mark Allen	10650	15075	25725

== World ranking points ==
No.	Ch	Player	Points 07/08	NIT	SM	GP	BC	UK	WO	CO	WSC	Points 08/09	Total
1		(England) Ronnie O'Sullivan	29700	5000	4000	3125	700	2850	1900	2500	3800	23875	53575
2		(Scotland) Stephen Maguire	25975	2500	3200	875	2500	4800	2500	700	5000	22075	48050
3		(England) Shaun Murphy	23700	700	700	875	700	7500	2500	2500	8000	23475	47175
4	▲1	(Scotland) John Higgins	14825	3200	1900	6250	0	3750	1900	4000	10000	31000	45825
5	▲2	(England) Ali Carter	18425	3200	700	4000	700	4800	5000	1900	3800	24100	42525
6	▲2	(Wales) Ryan Day	19425	1900	2500	5000	1900	1050	700	3200	5000	21250	40675
7	▼3	(England) Mark Selby	20050	1900	3200	2375	0	1050	2500	1900	5000	17925	37975
8	▲6	(Hong Kong) Marco Fu	18075	700	2500	2375	700	6000	2500	700	3800	19275	37350
9	▲1	(Australia) Neil Robertson	12400	700	1900	875	5000	2850	3200	1900	6400	22825	35225
10	▼4	(Scotland) Stephen Hendry	16900	700	700	2375	3200	1050	700	2500	5000	16225	33125
11	▲5	(Northern Ireland) Mark Allen	15075	2500	575	875	3200	2850	700	700	6400	17800	32875
12		(England) Joe Perry	18250	1900	1900	2375	1900	3750	700	700	1400	14625	32875
13	▼2	(China) Ding Junhui	15869	700	700	3125	0	2850	1900	700	3800	13775	29644
14	▼5	(England) Peter Ebdon	14975	700	700	2375	700	2850	700	5000	1400	14425	29400
15	▲7	(Wales) Mark Williams	15100	1900	2500	719	575	3750	575	1400	2800	14219	29319
16	▼1	(England) Mark King	13675	700	1900	875	700	2850	1900	1900	3800	14625	28300

== Points distribution ==
2008/2009 Points distribution for world ranking events:

Tournament	Round →	L96	L80	L64	L48	L32	L16	QF	SF	F	W
Northern Ireland Trophy	Unseeded loser	400	650	900	1150	1400	1900	2500	3200	4000	5000
Northern Ireland Trophy	Seeded loser	200	325	450	575	700	–	–	–	–	–
Shanghai Masters	Unseeded loser	400	650	900	1150	1400	1900	2500	3200	4000	5000
Shanghai Masters	Seeded loser	200	325	450	575	700	–	–	–	–	–
Grand Prix	Unseeded loser	500	813	1125	1438	1750	2375	3125	4000	5000	6250
Grand Prix	Seeded loser	250	407	563	719	875	–	–	–	–	–
Bahrain Championship	Unseeded loser	400	650	900	1150	1400	1900	2500	3200	4000	5000
Bahrain Championship	Seeded loser	200	325	450	575	700	–	–	–	–	–
UK Championship	Unseeded loser	600	975	1350	1725	2100	2850	3750	4800	6000	7500
UK Championship	Seeded loser	300	488	675	863	1050	–	–	–	–	–
Welsh Open	Unseeded loser	400	650	900	1150	1400	1900	2500	3200	4000	5000
Welsh Open	Seeded loser	200	325	450	575	700	–	–	–	–	–
China Open	Unseeded loser	400	650	900	1150	1400	1900	2500	3200	4000	5000
China Open	Seeded loser	200	325	450	575	700	–	–	–	–	–
World Championship	Unseeded loser	800	1300	1800	2300	2800	3800	5000	6400	8000	10000
World Championship	Seeded loser	400	650	900	1150	1400	–	–	–	–	–
