= Pro am =

Pro am, Pro Am, ProAm, proam, etc. may refer to:

- Pro–am, a level of play between amateur and professional in sports
- Amateur professionalism, a socio-economic concept of amateur output of professional quality
