= Charles Leadbeater =

British writer and political adviser

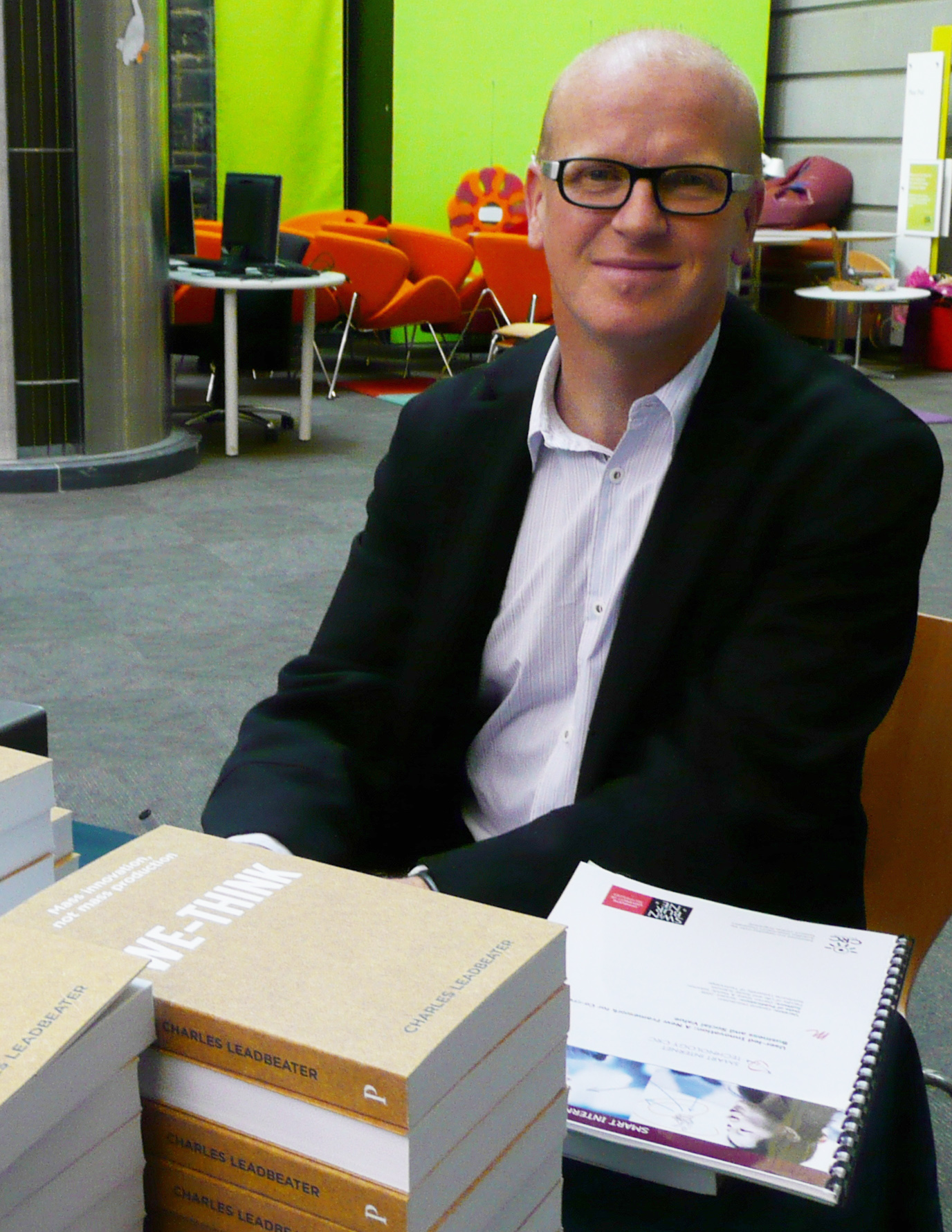
Leadbeater signing copies of We-think in 2008

Charles Leadbeater, also known as Charlie Leadbeater, is a British author and former advisor to Tony Blair.

== Biography ==
A graduate of Balliol College, Oxford, he first came to widespread notice in the 1980s as a regular contributor to the magazine Marxism Today. Later he was Industrial Editor and Tokyo Bureau Chief at the Financial Times. While working at The Independent in the 1990s, he devised Bridget Jones's Diary (originally a column) with Helen Fielding. He worked on social entrepreneurship, publishing The Rise of the Social Entrepreneur in 1997. He advised the British government on matters of the Internet and the knowledge-driven economy.

His book, We-think, explores the new phenomenon of mass creativity exemplified by web sites such as YouTube, Wikipedia and MySpace. The book, which in a preliminary version is open to public criticism and revision, argues that participation and sharing, rather than consumption or production, will be the key organizing idea of future society.

In September 2010 Leadbeater opened the Incubate (festival), in Tilburg, The Netherlands. In a 2014 report for the think tank Centre for London, Leadbeater coined the term 'Endies' (short for 'Employed but with No Disposable Income or Savings'), to refer to the growing number of households in London struggling on modest incomes in the aftermath of the 2008 financial crisis.

In 2015, Leadbeater was working as an innovation consultant and was described as "leading authority on innovation and creativity" in 2020

== Works ==
- A Piece of the Action: Employee Ownership, Equity Pay and the Rise of the Knowledge Economy (Demos Papers) (1997)
- Living on Thin Air: The New Economy (1999)
- The Independents: Britain's New Cultural Entrepreneurs (co-authored with Kate Oakley) (1999)
- Living on Thin Air: The New Economy (2000)
- Personalisation Through Participation: A New Script for Public Services (2004)
- Up the Down Escalator: Why the Global Pessimists Are Wrong (2004)
- The Pro-Am Revolution (co-authored with Paul Miller) (2004)
- We-think: The Power of Mass Creativity (2008)
- Innovation in Education: Lessons from Pioneers Around the World Paperback (photography by Romain Staropoli) (2012)
- The Frugal Innovator: Creating Change on a Shoestring Budget (2014)

== See also ==
- Professional amateurs
