= 2009 Paul Hunter Classic =

Tournament information
- Dates: 13–16 August 2009
- Venue: Stadthalle
- City: Fürth
- Country: Germany
- Format: Pro–am event
- Total prize fund: €20,000
- Winner's share: €5,000
- Highest break: Shaun Murphy (ENG) (139)

Final
- Champion: (England) Shaun Murphy
- Runner-up: (England) Jimmy White
- Score: 4–0

The 2009 Paul Hunter Classic was a pro–am snooker tournament that took place between 13 and 16 August 2009. Shaun Murphy was the reigning champion, and defended his title in the final against Jimmy White with a 4–0 win.

== Main draw ==
Last 64; Best of 5 frames
(England) Shaun Murphy	3
(Germany) Michael Betzinger	0
(England) Rod Lawler	3
(Germany) Roman Dietzel	0
(Republic of Ireland) Fergal O'Brien	3
(Germany) Volker Lawetski	0
(Scotland) Alan McManus	3
(Germany) Sebastian Kan	0
(England) Barry Hawkins	3
(Netherlands) Frans van Eekelen	1
(England) Jack Lisowski	2
(Republic of Ireland) Ken Doherty	3
(Wales) Daniel Wells	3
(Netherlands) Misja van Vonderen	1
(England) Mark King	3
(Poland) Krzysztof Wrobel	1
(England) Mark Selby	3
(Germany) Christian Schrick	0
(England) Tom Ford	2
(Brazil) Igor Figueiredo	3
(England) Rory McLeod	3
(Netherlands) Jurgen van Roy	0
(England) Ricky Walden	3
(Belgium) Eddy Kindermans	1
(England) Stuart Bingham	3
(Germany) Kevin Lämmermann	0
(England) Mohammed Naeem	0
(Republic of Ireland) Michael Judge	3
(England) Barry Pinches	3
(Scotland) John Higgins	1
(Wales) Ryan Day	3
(Germany) Lasse Münstermann	1
(Germany) Warren Smith	1
(Netherlands) Maurice Le Duc	3
(England) Matthew Selt	0
(Brazil) Itaro Santos	3
(Wales) Dominic Dale	3
(Germany) Sascha Lippe	0
(Northern Ireland) Joe Swail	3
(Netherlands) Rene van Rijsbergen	0
(England) Dave Harold	3
(Netherlands) Joris Maas	0
(Scotland) Marcus Campbell	1
(England) Kuldesh Johal	3
(England) Jimmy Michie	3
(Netherlands) Alain Vandersteen	0
(England) Joe Perry	0
(Belgium) Luca Brecel	3
(England) Judd Trump	3
(New Zealand) Chris McBreen	2
(England) Mark Davis	3
(Germany) Robert Drahn	0
(England) Andrew Higginson	3
(Malta) Tony Drago	2
(England) Jamie Cope	3
(Belgium) Jurian Huesdens	0
(England) Michael Holt	3
(Germany) Patrick Dauscher	0
(Northern Ireland) Gerard Greene	3
(England) Lee Richardson	1
(England) Jimmy White	3
(Germany) Jörn Hannes-Hühn	0
(Scotland) Stephen Maguire	3
(Germany) Mike Henson	0

Last 32; Best of 5 frames
(England) Shaun Murphy	3
(England) Rod Lawler	1
(Republic of Ireland) Fergal O'Brien	2
(Scotland) Alan McManus	3
(England) Barry Hawkins	1
(Republic of Ireland) Ken Doherty	3
(Wales) Daniel Wells	3
(England) Mark King	0
(England) Mark Selby	3
(Brazil) Igor Figueiredo	0
(England) Rory McLeod	3
(England) Ricky Walden	2
(England) Stuart Bingham	3
(Republic of Ireland) Michael Judge	2
(England) Barry Pinches	1
(Wales) Ryan Day	3
(Netherlands) Maurice Le Duc	2
(Brazil) Itaro Santos	3
(Wales) Dominic Dale	0
(Northern Ireland) Joe Swail	3
(England) Dave Harold	1
(Scotland) Marcus Campbell	3
(England) Jimmy Michie	3
(Belgium) Luca Brecel	0
(England) Judd Trump	1
(England) Mark Davis	3
(England) Andrew Higginson	3
(England) Jamie Cope	1
(England) Michael Holt	3
(Northern Ireland) Gerard Greene	2
(England) Jimmy White	3
(Scotland) Stephen Maguire	0

Last 16; Best of 5 frames
(England) Shaun Murphy	3
(Scotland) Alan McManus	1
(Republic of Ireland) Ken Doherty	3
(Wales) Daniel Wells	1
(England) Mark Selby	0
(England) Rory McLeod	3
(England) Stuart Bingham	1
(Wales) Ryan Day	3
(Brazil) Itaro Santos	1
(Northern Ireland) Joe Swail	3
(Scotland) Marcus Campbell	0
(England) Jimmy Michie	3
(England) Mark Davis	3
(England) Andrew Higginson	1
(England) Michael Holt	1
(England) Jimmy White	3

Quarter-finals; Best of 5 frames
(England) Shaun Murphy	3
(Republic of Ireland) Ken Doherty	1
(England) Rory McLeod	3
(Wales) Ryan Day	0
(Northern Ireland) Joe Swail	3
(England) Jimmy Michie	1
(England) Mark Davis	1
(England) Jimmy White	3

Semi-finals; Best of 5 frames
(England) Shaun Murphy	3
(England) Rory McLeod	2
(Northern Ireland) Joe Swail	1
(England) Jimmy White	3

Final; Best of 7 frames
(England) Shaun Murphy	4
(England) Jimmy White	0

== Century breaks ==
- 139 – Shaun Murphy
- 133 – Rod Lawler
- 132 – Ryan Day
- 126, 107 – Alan McManus
- 126 – Marcus Campbell
- 125 – Mark King
- 124 – Stuart Bingham
- 122 – Ken Doherty
- 121 – Mark Selby
- 115, 102 – Jimmy White
- 112 – Joe Swail
- 107, 105 – Jimmy Michie
- 107 – Barry Pinches
- 107 – Judd Trump
- 106 – Fergal O'Brien
- 103 – Michael Holt
- 101, 100 – Dave Harold
- 100 – Joe Perry
