= Endies =

Term for low income workers

Endies (short for 'Employed, but No Disposable Income or Savings') are workers struggling to get by on modest incomes. The term was coined in 2014 by Charles Leadbeater in a report for the think tank Centre for London. The report identified the huge number of households in London struggling to balance rising living costs with falling incomes in the aftermath of the 2008 economic crisis.

Endies find life increasingly hard. Their wages have stalled, while living costs – especially housing, transport, energy and childcare – keep going up. They are trapped in particular between a highly flexible competitive labour market and a deeply dysfunctional housing market – for most, owning a home is an ever more distant dream. Endies can be seen as a sub-group of the Squeezed Middle – they work hard and earn too much to claim benefits. But they have no money to put down roots, get a stable home of their own, or enjoy life. The report which coined the term suggests that about one in five London household falls into this category.

Leadbeater characterises Endies in terms of both income and values. In the introduction to Hollow Promise Leadbeater writes that "in contrast to the Yuppies who were proudly ostentatious, the Endies live quiet and modest lives largely hidden from view for a simple reason: most of the time they cannot afford to go out. Life is an endless treadmill of work, commuting and recovering at home, often with the Internet for company and little other respite... A quiet sense of crisis is the Endies’ persistent companion yet they are largely hidden from view, uncomplaining and overlooked by both public services and the market." Endies believe in a social contract according to which, if you work hard and contribute, you should be able to live a decent life and your children a better one still. Yet they find that London is no longer honouring its side of the contract: they work hard in vital jobs but struggle to survive.
