= Shaun Murphy =

English snooker player (born 1982)

Shaun Murphy OBE
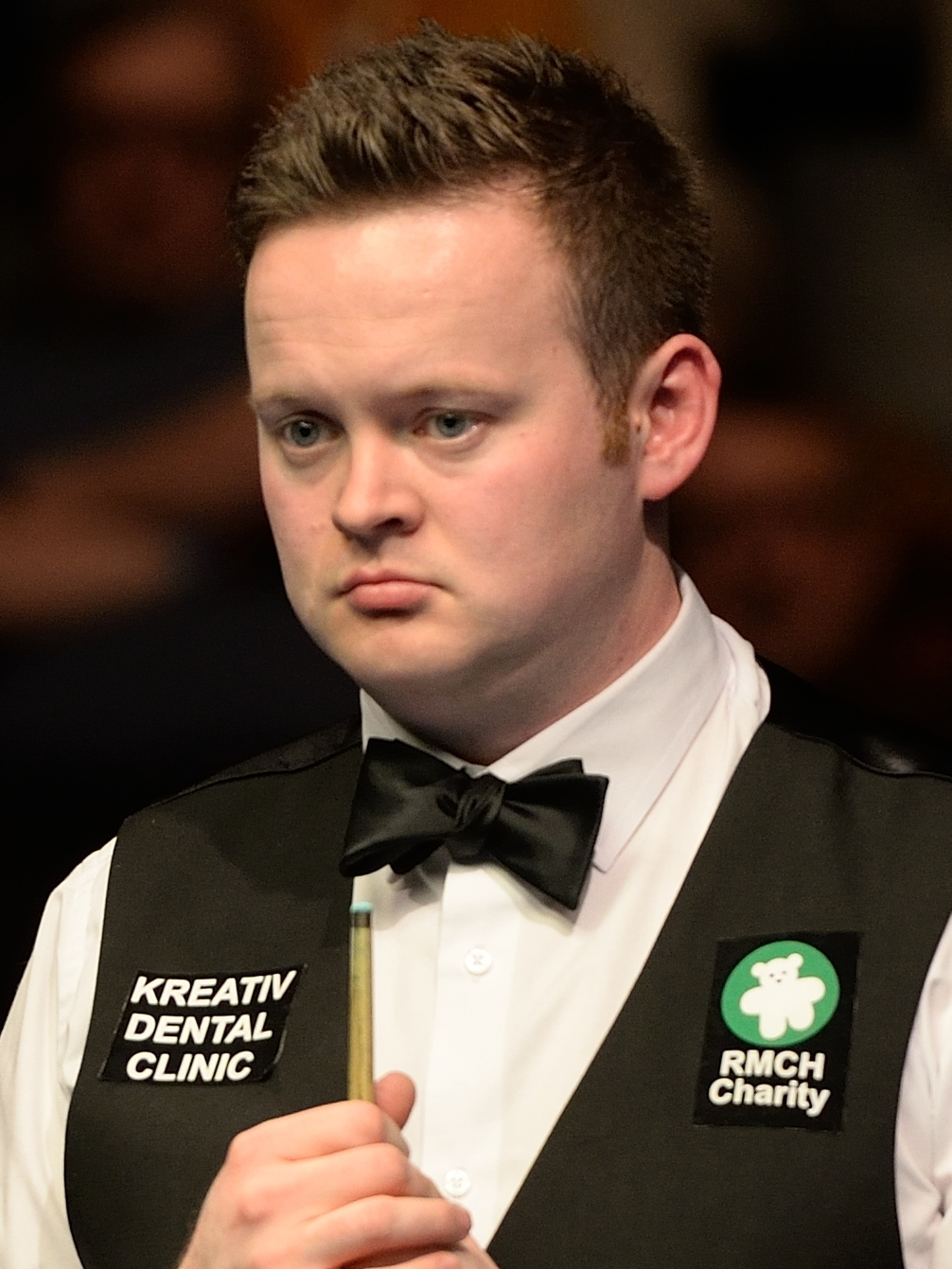
- Murphy in 2015

Personal information
- Nickname: The Magician
- Born: 10 August 1982 (age 44) Harlow, England

Sport
- Country: England
- Sport: Snooker
- Professional: 1998/1999, 2001–present
- Highest ranking: 3 (May 2007 – May 2010)
- Current ranking: 7 (as of 7 November 2026)
- Maximum breaks: 10
- Century breaks: 797 (as of 21 November 2026)

Tournament wins
- Ranking: 13
- Minor-ranking: 4
- World Championship: 2005

Shaun Peter Murphy OBE (born 10 August 1982) is an English professional snooker player who won the 2005 World Championship and has completed the Triple Crown. Nicknamed "The Magician", Murphy is noted for his straight cue action and his long potting.

Born in Harlow, Essex, and raised in Irthlingborough, Northamptonshire, Murphy turned professional in 1998. His 2005 victory at the World Championship was considered a major surprise as he was only the third qualifier to win the title after Alex Higgins and Terry Griffiths. Since then, he has been runner-up at the World Championship four times, in 2009, 2015, 2021 and 2026. He has earned thirteen ranking titles, including the UK Championship in 2008, which places him tenth on the all-time list of ranking tournament victories. He has also won twelve non-ranking tournaments, including the 2015 Masters (which completed his career Triple Crown) and the 2025 Masters.

Murphy has earned over £4 million in prize money and has compiled more than 700 century breaks, including ten maximum breaks. His highest world ranking was number three, which he maintained for three seasons following the 2007–08 season.

== Early life ==
Murphy was born on 10 August 1982 in Harlow, England. Murphy began playing snooker at the age of eight after his parents bought him a snooker table for Christmas. He made his first century break at the age of 10 and practised at the Rushden Snooker Centre, where players such as Stephen Hendry, Mark Williams and Ken Doherty have also played. At the age of 13, he secured a five-year £5,000-a-year sponsorship deal with the Doc Martens shoe company and stated his ambitions of winning the World Championship and becoming world number one. He turned professional in 1998 at the age of 15.

Murphy was coached by Steve Prest until the 2006–07 season. He also received guidance from Willie Thorne and Ray Reardon, and when he was 15 he was given Reardon's old cue by his father.

== Snooker career ==
=== 1998–2001 ===
Murphy began his career on the UK Tour in 1998 (renamed the Challenge Tour in 2000), at the time the second-level professional tour. He was runner-up in the fourth event on the UK tour for the 1997–98 season and, for the 2000–01 season, won the third and fourth events on the Challenge Tour, topping the Order of Merit rankings.

In 2000, he received the World Snooker Newcomer of the Year award and one of six Young Player of Distinction of the Year awards from the World Professional Billiards and Snooker Association. In 2000, he won the English Open Championship.

Murphy won his first professional tournament at the 2000 Benson & Hedges Championship, defeating Mark Davis 6–1 in the semi-final, and Stuart Bingham 9–7 in the final, recovering from 2–5 down. Although he was not yet on the first-level main tour, this victory brought qualification for the Masters—a prestigious non-ranking invitation tournament with places for members of the top 16, the winner of the qualifying tournament and a limited number of wildcards. In the 2001 tournament, he showed promise in his first televised match, defeating world number 15, Marco Fu, and building a 4–1 lead over seven-time world champion Stephen Hendry, before losing the match. He made his first maximum break in the 2001 Benson & Hedges Championship.

=== 2002–2004 ===
Murphy first reached the final stages of a ranking event at the 2002 World Championship, hosted at the Crucible Theatre, where he lost 4–10 to Stephen Hendry in the first round. In the 2002–03 season, he reached the final stages of the Scottish Open, where he was defeated 3–5 by Drew Henry in the first round, and the World Championship, where he lost 9–10 against Ken Doherty on the final black in the first round.

For the 2003–04 season, Murphy was ranked number 64 and qualified for the final stages of three ranking tournaments. In the LG Cup, he defeated Steve Davis 5–4 in the second round, before losing 2–5 to John Higgins in the third. After the victory over Davis, Murphy said "This is one of the greatest days in my snooker career." In the British Open, he defeated Dave Harold 5–1 in the first round, before losing to Paul Hunter 2–5 in the second round.

In the Players Championship—the new name of the Scottish Open—he lost 3–5 to eventual champion Jimmy White in the second round. He failed to reach the World Championship, losing a qualifying match 7–10 against Stuart Pettman, in which Pettman was docked a frame for arriving late.

=== 2004–05 season: World Champion ===
Murphy was ranked number 48 for the 2004–05 season and reached the final stages of four ranking events. In the Grand Prix—the new name of the LG Cup—he lost 2–5 to Stephen Maguire in the first round. This was followed by his first ranking semi-final, at the British Open, where he was whitewashed 0–6 by John Higgins. In the Malta Cup, he lost 2–5 to Matthew Stevens in the first round.

Murphy won two qualifying matches to reach the main stage of the 2005 World Championship and then defeated former world champions Higgins 13–8, Steve Davis 13–4 and Peter Ebdon 17–12 to reach the final where he faced Stevens, the world number six. After trailing 6–10 at the end of the first day (the World Championship final is played over two days), he made a comeback to level the score at 16–16. He then made two frame-winning breaks to lift the title. His 11 century breaks were the most in that year's tournament.

Murphy's victory was considered a major surprise. His pre-tournament odds were 150–1 and before his win he was considered an underachiever. He became only the third qualifier to win the World Championship (or to reach the final) after Alex Higgins in 1972 and Terry Griffiths in 1979. Aged 22, Murphy was the second-youngest player to win the World Championship, following Stephen Hendry who first lifted the title when he was 21. No previous world champion had played as many matches (seven) to lift the title, and he was the lowest-ranked player, at number 48, to win the tournament. No player had won the World Championship as his first ranking event win since Joe Johnson in 1986. Murphy's run in the tournament earned him the nickname "The Magician" and the tournament doubled his previous career prize money, with which he purchased a house and a Mercedes-Benz. After his win, in July 2005, he married his fiancée Clare.

=== 2005–06 season ===
For the new season, Murphy improved his ranking to number 21, which would not usually guarantee qualification for ranking events. However, as world champion he qualified automatically for every tournament in the season as the number two seed (and number one seed for the 2006 World Championship). He was invited to play in the Premier League Snooker, a non-ranking tournament with a 25 second shot clock, but he went out in the round-robin stage.

He reached the quarter-finals of the inaugural, non-ranking Northern Ireland Trophy before being defeated 4–5 by Neil Robertson. In the first three ranking events of the season—the Grand Prix, the UK Championship and the Malta Cup—Murphy reached the last 16, losing final-frame matches to Stuart Bingham, Robertson, and Graeme Dott, respectively. After his loss to Bingham, he complained about having to play his match on an outside table, given his world champion status. In the revival of Pot Black, a single-frame knockout tournament not staged since 1991, he was defeated in the final by Matthew Stevens. Murphy was awarded Sportsman of the Year at the BBC East Midlands Sports Awards in December 2005.

At the Masters, Murphy lost 4–6 to John Higgins in the quarter-finals, but reached his second ranking final in the Welsh Open, losing 4–9 to Stephen Lee. In the World Championship, he reached the quarter-finals, but fell victim to the so-called "Crucible curse", where no first-time champion has successfully defended the title at the Crucible Theatre, when he was defeated 7–13 by Peter Ebdon.

=== 2006–07 season ===
For the next season, Murphy moved to number five in the world rankings, entering the elite top 16 for the first time and thereby automatically qualifying for the final stages of ranking tournaments and receiving an automatic invitation to the Masters.

In the Northern Ireland Trophy (a ranking event in this season), he lost 4–5 to Stephen Lee in the quarter-finals, and in the UK Championship, he lost 3–9 to Alan McManus in the second round. A 3–6 defeat by Stephen Hendry in the quarter-finals of the Masters was followed by his second ranking title, when he defeated Ryan Day 9–4 in the final of the Malta Cup. After the victory, he said it was a relief to get rid of the one-hit wonder label. In his next match, a victory over Jamie Cope in the Welsh Open, he scored centuries in four consecutive frames, becoming only the second player to do so (after John Higgins in the 2005 Grand Prix final) and the only person to achieve this in a best-of-nine-frames match. He went on to lose 3–5 to Stephen Maguire in the quarter-finals. In the World Championship, Murphy defeated Matthew Stevens 13–12 in the quarter-finals—recovering from 5–11 down and knocking Stevens out of the top 16—before losing 16–17 against Mark Selby in the semi-finals.

=== 2007–08 season ===
For the 2007–08 season, Murphy was ranked number three, his highest-ever ranking, and reached at least the semi-finals of five ranking events but without winning any.

In the inaugural Shanghai Masters, he was defeated 2–5 by Ian McCulloch in the first round. He reached the final of the 2007 Pot Black tournament, where he was defeated by Ken Doherty. In the Grand Prix, he reached the semi-finals, where he lost 5–6 against Ronnie O'Sullivan, despite an earlier 5–2 lead. Further semi-finals followed at the Northern Ireland Trophy and the UK Championship, where he was defeated on both occasions by Stephen Maguire, 5–6 and 5–9, respectively, making it three consecutive semi-final losses. Before the UK Championship, Murphy was provisionally ranked world number one. He successfully defended his Malta Cup title (that year the tournament was not a ranking event) with a 9–3 victory over Doherty in the final. In the China Open, he defeated Mark Selby 6–3 in the semi-finals—his sixth semi-final appearance in the past seven ranking events—but lost 9–10 to Maguire in the final.

Before the World Championship, Murphy was again provisional world number one. As one of the favourites for the championship, he reached the second round where he lost 4–13 to Ali Carter. After his loss, Murphy criticised the state of the tables.

=== 2008–09 season: UK Champion ===
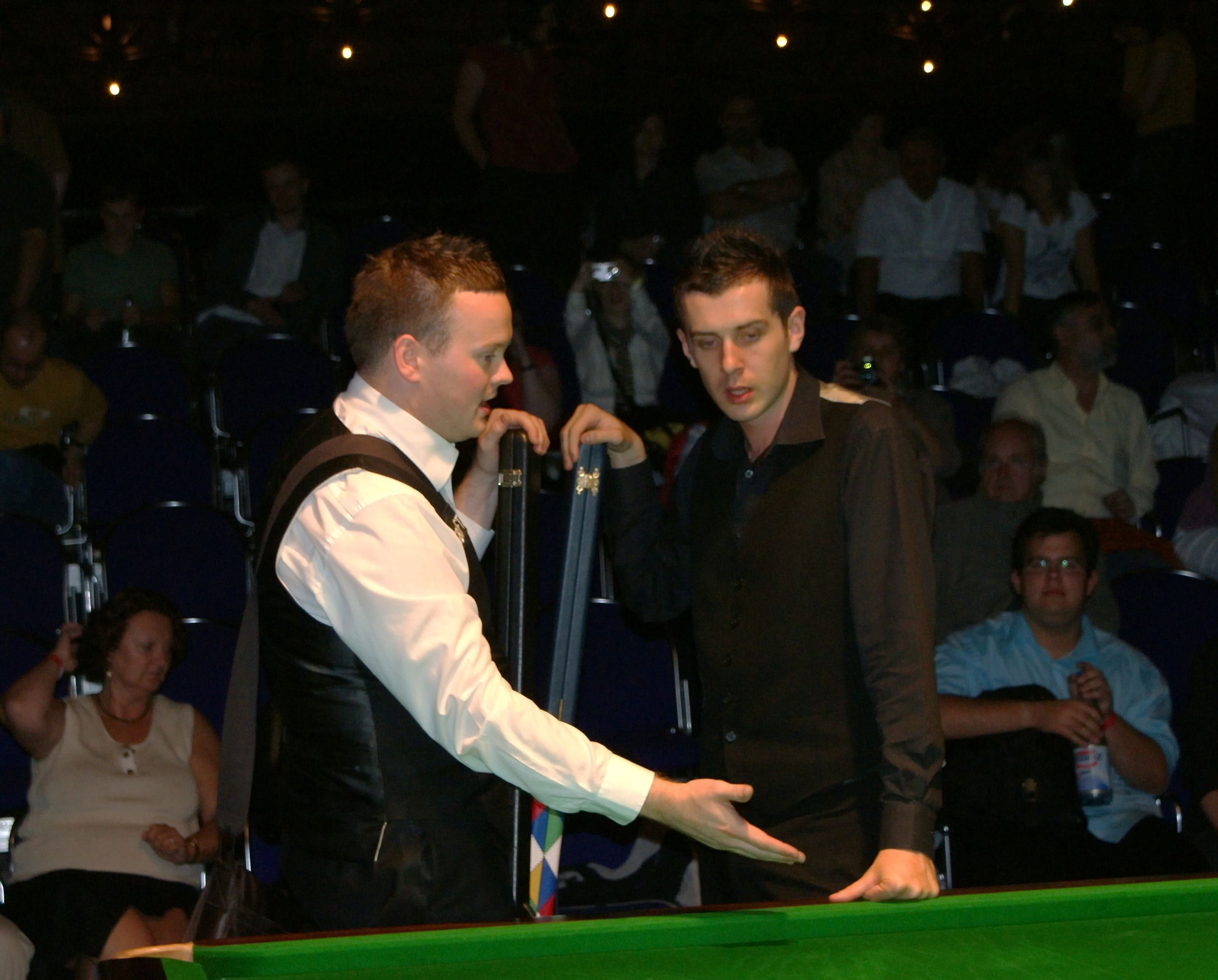
Murphy speaking with Mark Selby before the final of the 2008 Paul Hunter Classic

Murphy maintained his number three ranking for the 2008–09 season. He won the non-ranking Paul Hunter Classic, defeating Mark Selby 4–0 in the final, but lost in the first round of the first four ranking tournaments, including a 4–5 defeat by world number 47 Mike Dunn in the Bahrain Championship. Murphy and his wife separated in October, after three years of marriage.

Despite the four consecutive first-round losses—which had been attributed to the split from his wife—he claimed his third ranking title at the UK Championship, defeating Marco Fu 10–9 in a low-quality final, in which he fluked a pink in the deciding frame that was effectively match ball. The victory meant that Murphy joined Steve Davis, Alex Higgins, Terry Griffiths, John Parrott, Stephen Hendry, Ronnie O'Sullivan, Mark Williams, John Higgins and Peter Ebdon as one of only ten players to have won both the World title and the UK title.

In the World Championship, there were concerns that Murphy's estranged wife would serve him divorce papers during play of his first-round match against Andrew Higginson. He defeated Higginson 10–8 without incident, although his wife's parents were present in the arena and were asked to leave. He went on to defeat Fu 13–3, Hendry 13–11 and Neil Robertson 17–14, to earn a place in his second world final with two-time world champion Higgins as his opponent. In the final, he trailed 5–11 after the first day and was beaten 9–18 by Higgins. On the first day of the final, a newspaper published a "kiss and tell" story involving Murphy.

=== 2009–10 season ===
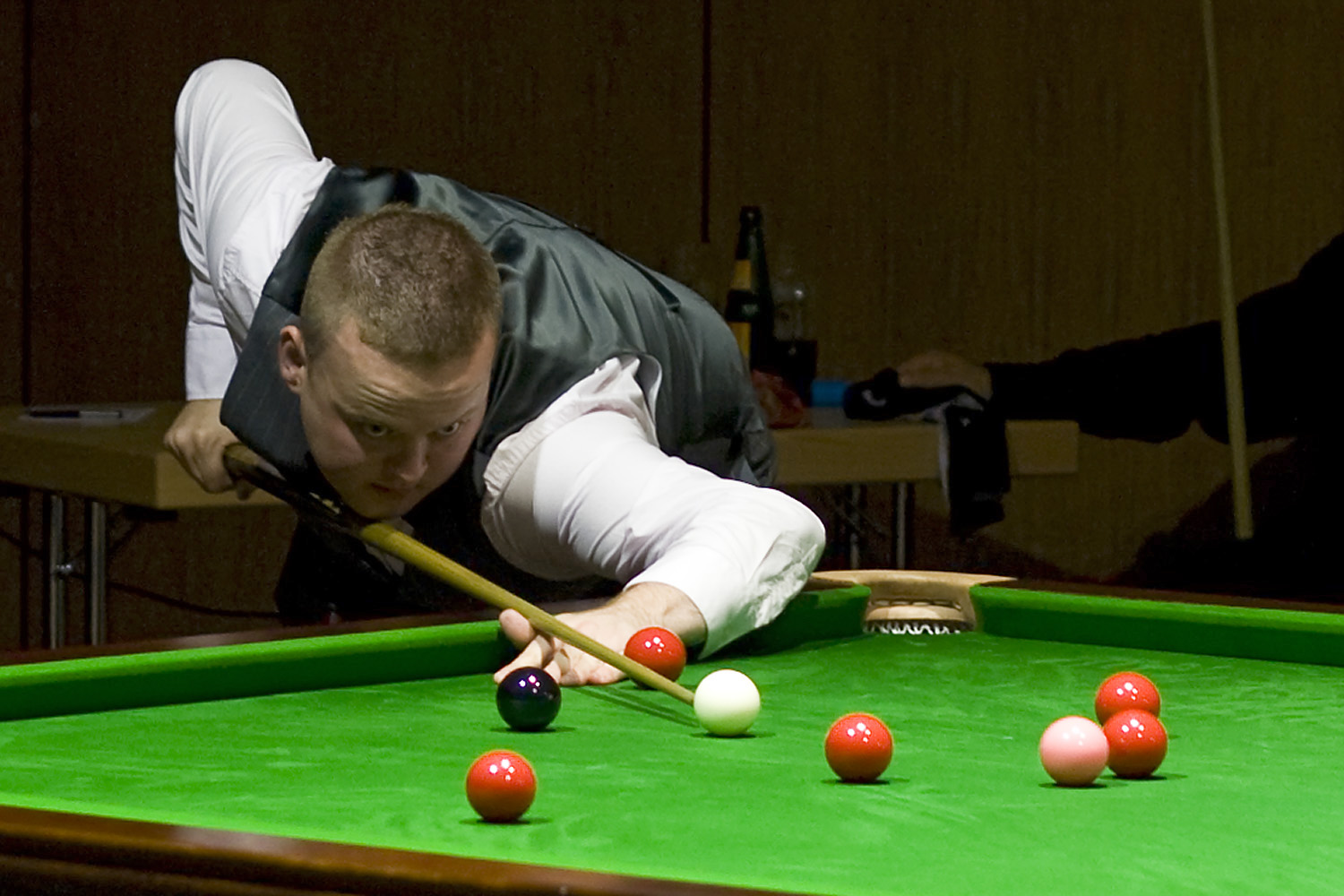
Murphy at the 2009 Paul Hunter Classic

Murphy maintained his number three ranking for a third year in the 2009–10 season. He successfully defended his Paul Hunter Classic title, defeating White 4–0 in the final. He won the Premier League Snooker with a 7–3 win against O'Sullivan in the final, ending the latter's run of five consecutive wins in the tournament.

He reached the semi-finals of the first ranking tournament, the Shanghai Masters, before losing 5–6 against Liang Wenbo. This would be his only run to the semi-finals or better in a ranking tournament that season. In the UK Championship, as the defending champion, he lost 5–9 to eventual winner Ding Junhui in the second round. After the match, Murphy complained about Ding leaving the arena too often after frames, saying "I can't believe anyone needs to go to the toilet after every single frame." He reached the quarter-finals of the Masters, where he lost 4–6 against Mark Williams. In the Welsh Open and the China Open, he lost his first-round matches to Matthew Stevens and Nigel Bond, respectively. In the World Championship, he defeated Gerard Greene and Ding, but lost 12–13 against Ali Carter in the quarter-finals, despite leading 8–4. This was the first season in which he did not reach a final or better of a ranking tournament since the 2003–04 season.

=== 2010–11 season ===
After three seasons ranked world number three, Murphy dropped to number seven for the 2010–11 season. He won the Wuxi Classic, a non-ranking tournament held in China, defeating Ding Junhui 9–8 after recovering from 2–8 down. He progressed to the semi-finals of the Paul Hunter Classic, the first European event of the season's Players Tour Championship minor-ranking series, but lost 2–4 to eventual winner Judd Trump. Murphy won the Brugge Open, the second European event of the series, defeating Matthew Couch 4–2 in the final. He then reached the final of the Ruhr Championship, but lost 2–4 against John Higgins. Murphy finished first on the Players Tour Championship Order of Merit, but could not defend his Premier League Snooker title, as he lost 1–7 to Ronnie O'Sullivan in the final. He reached the semi-finals of the UK Championship, where he lost to eventual runner-up Mark Williams 8–9.

Murphy lost in the first round of the Masters 3–6 against Jamie Cope, in the second round of the German Masters 2–5 against Joe Swail, and in the first round of the Welsh Open 0–4 against Matthew Stevens. He won his fourth ranking title in March 2011, with a 4–0 victory over Martin Gould in the finals of the Players Tour Championship. The following week, he also reached the final of the Championship League, but lost 1–3 against Stevens. He progressed to the semi-final of the China Open, where he lost 1–6 against Trump. Murphy's last tournament of the season was the World Championship, where he lost in the second round 10–13 against O'Sullivan.

=== 2011–12 season ===
Murphy began the 2011–12 season ranked number seven. He could not defend his Wuxi Classic title, as he lost 3–6 against Ali Carter. Murphy reached the semi-finals of the Australian Goldfields Open, but lost 2–6 against eventual champion Stuart Bingham. At the Shanghai Masters Murphy reached the quarter-finals, but lost 4–5 against Mark Selby. Murphy's next tournament was the Brazil Masters, where he defeated Graeme Dott 5–0 in the final. Murphy also participated at the Premier League and ended the league stage with two wins and four losses. As a result, he did not advance to the play-off. Murphy then reached the quarter-finals of the UK Championship, but lost 3–6 against Ricky Walden. He also participated at the Players Tour Championship, where his best results came at the Warsaw Classic and the Kay Suzanne Memorial Trophy, where he reached the quarter-finals, but lost 3–4 against Neil Robertson and 2–4 against Matthew Stevens respectively. He finished number 37 on the Order of Merit, and could not qualify to the Finals to defend his title.

Murphy reached his first Masters final, but lost 6–10 against Robertson. Murphy then reached the semi-finals of the next two ranking tournaments, but lost 0–6 against Stephen Maguire at the German Masters, 2–6 against Ding Junhui at the Welsh Open. He then lost in the quarter-finals of the World Open 0–5 against Mark Selby. Murphy ended the season with two first round losses. He lost 2–5 against wild-card Lu Ning at the China Open and 8–10 against Jamie Jones at the World Snooker Championship.

=== 2012–13 season ===
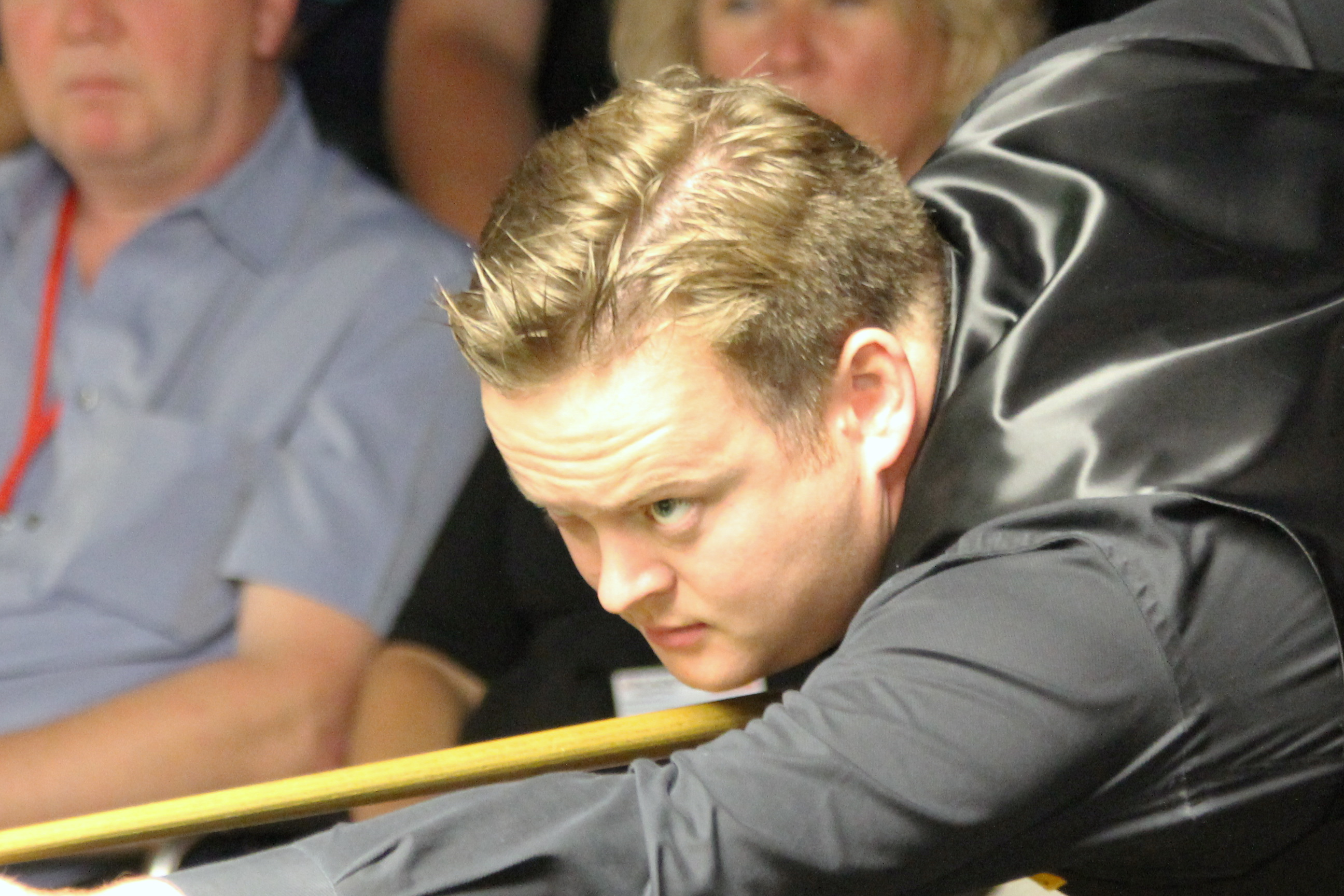
Murphy at the 2012 Paul Hunter Classic

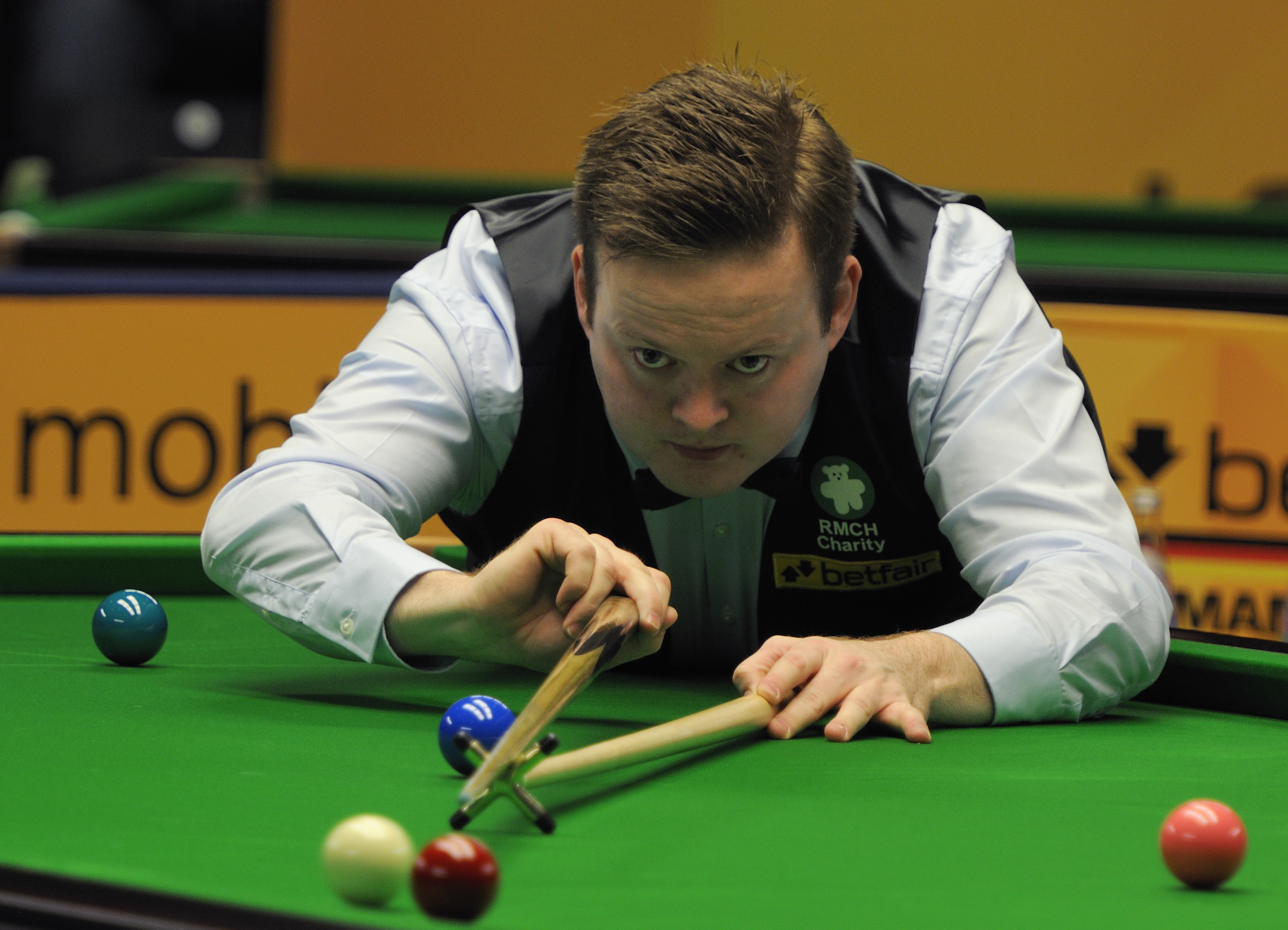
Murphy at the 2013 German Masters

Murphy began the 2012–13 season ranked number six. The first tournament for Murphy was the Wuxi Classic, where he lost in the first round 1–5 against Ken Doherty. Murphy's next tournament was the Six-red World Championship, where he finished first in Group E with four wins out of five matches and advanced to the knock-out stage. There he defeated James Wattana, Barry Hawkins, Dominic Dale and Judd Trump to reach the final, but lost 4–8 against Mark Davis. He then reached the quarter-finals of the Australian Goldfields Open, but lost 4–5 against Peter Ebdon. Murphy went one better in the next two ranking tournaments, as he reached the semi-finals of the Shanghai Masters and the International Championship, but lost 3–6 against John Higgins and 5–9 against Neil Robertson respectively. Murphy than reached the final of the 2012 UK Championship courtesy of two tight victories. The first against teenager Luca Brecel in the quarter-finals, after Brecel twice had the chance to pot the final pink and black to win the match, then against Ali Carter in which Murphy recovered from 4–8 down and 0–32 in points behind in the deciding frame to win 9–8. He was ultimately defeated by good friend Mark Selby 6–10 in the final. He also participated at the Players Tour Championship, with his best result coming at the third English event, where he reached the semi-finals, but lost 0–4 against Marco Fu. He finished number 29 on the Order of Merit, and couldn't qualify to the Finals.

Murphy began the year by reaching the semi-finals at the Masters, but lost 2–6 against Robertson. He then reached the quarter-final of the German Masters, but lost 4–5 against Robertson. In the first round of the 2013 World Snooker Championship, Murphy defeated Martin Gould 10–5 to advance to the second round, where he faced Graeme Dott, winning 13–11. In the quarter-final, he faced Trump in a tense match that went to a deciding frame, after Trump won five consecutive frames from 7–12 down to level at 12–12. Trump ultimately prevailed in a nervy last frame to go through to the semi-final.

=== 2013–14 season ===
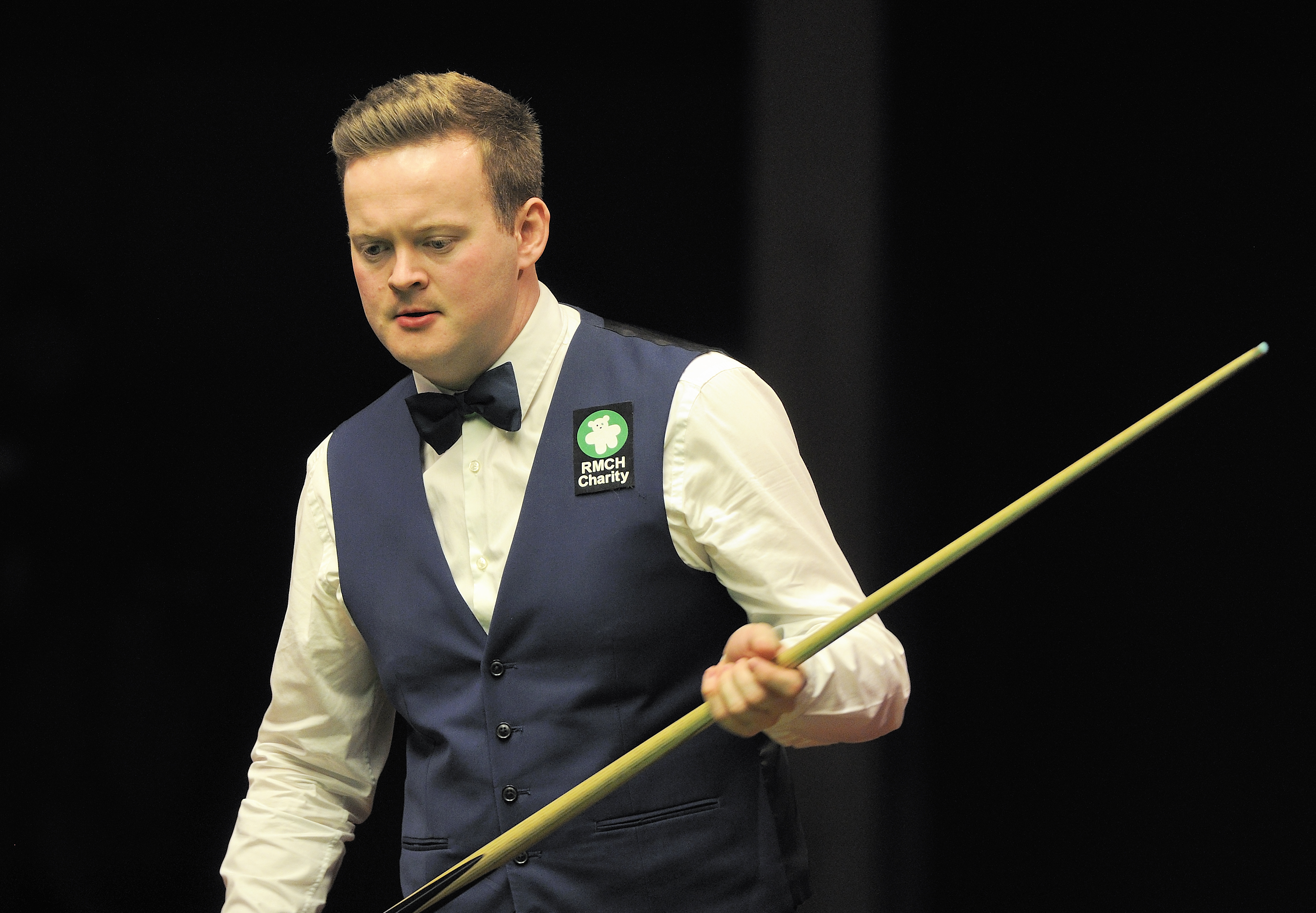
Murphy at the 2014 German Masters

Murphy's 2013–14 season began with a shock 1–5 defeat by Alex Davies in the qualifying round of the 2013 Wuxi Classic. The tournament was the first to use a new format that required top-16 players to compete in qualifiers.

Between August 2013 and January 2014, Murphy lost 3 stones (42 pounds or 19 kg) in weight, due to a new diet and fitness regime. He stated that one of his health and fitness goals was to improve his stamina and concentration at the table.

In group two of the 2014 Championship League, he made his second official maximum break in his round-robin match against Mark Davis.

In the first round of the Masters, Murphy came back from 2–4 behind to defeat Ding Junhui 6–4. He produced another comeback in the quarter-finals, where he trailed Marco Fu 1–4 before winning five frames in a row to clinch a 6–4 victory. He faced defending champion Mark Selby in the semi-finals, but lost 1–6.

In February 2014, while playing Jamie Jones in the last 16 of the minor-ranking Gdynia Open, Murphy made his second 147 break of the season and the third of his professional career. He went on to win the tournament, defeating Fergal O'Brien 4–1 in the final to capture his first title in 29 months. The following month, he defeated Selby 10–6 in the final of the World Open, winning the fifth ranking title of his career and his first ranking title in three years.

At the World Championship, Murphy defeated Jamie Cope 10–9 and Marco Fu 13–8 to reach the quarter-finals, where he faced defending champion Ronnie O'Sullivan. Murphy was defeated 3–13 with a session to spare.

=== 2014–15 season: Masters Champion ===
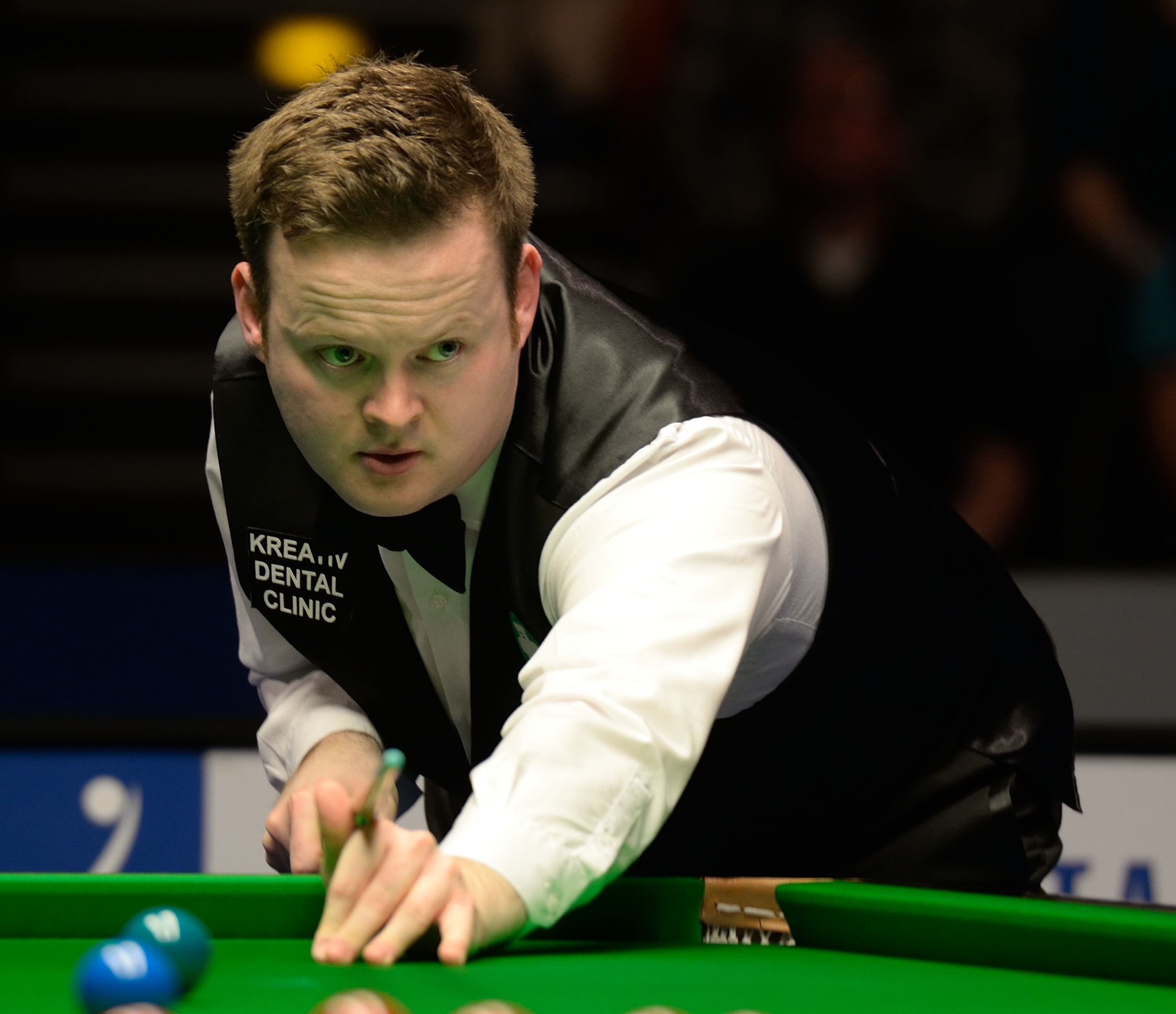
Murphy at the 2015 German Masters

Murphy won the Bulgarian Open in October, with a 4–2 victory over Martin Gould in the final. Two weeks later, he reached the final of the General Cup but lost 6–7 against Ali Carter. In November, he won the Ruhr Open by defeating Robert Milkins 4–0 in the final. In the second frame of this match, he achieved the fourth maximum break of his career after missing out on the maximum on two previous occasions earlier that day—in a match against Joe Swail where Murphy made a break of 129 before missing the blue ball, and in a match against Mark Williams where the maximum attempt ended on a break of 122 as he missed the green ball. In 2014, Murphy became the first player to make three maximums in a calendar year.

At the Masters in January, he defeated Mark Selby, Stephen Maguire and Mark Allen en route to the final against Neil Robertson. Murphy won the match 10–2, completing his career Triple Crown.

In the World Championship, seeded eighth, Murphy beat Robin Hull 10–3, Joe Perry 13–5, Anthony McGill 13–8 and Barry Hawkins 17–9, to reach his third final, where he met tenth seed Stuart Bingham. Despite leading 3–0 and 8–5, Murphy fell behind 11–14 in the third session; after fighting back to level the score at 15–15, he lost the next three frames and the final 15–18.

=== 2015–16 season ===
At the UK Championship, Murphy defeated Ashley Hugill, Zhou Yuelong and Ben Woollaston to reach the last 16, but then lost 4–6 to Marco Fu. In defence of his title at the Masters, he was knocked out in the first round by Mark Allen, losing 4–6. Murphy's only ranking title this season came at the World Grand Prix in March. With wins over Michael White, Martin Gould, Liang Wenbo and Ding Junhui, he met Stuart Bingham in the final—a repeat of the previous year's World Championship final—and claimed the victory this time by winning 10–9. At the World Snooker Championship, Murphy suffered a shocking first-round exit, losing 8–10 to Anthony McGill.

=== 2016–17 season ===
Murphy reached the semi-finals of the UK Championship but lost 2–6 to the eventual champion Mark Selby. He faced another first-round exit at the Masters, this time losing heavily to Barry Hawkins 1–6. In March 2017, Murphy won his seventh ranking title, and his first of the season, by beating Judd Trump 4–2 in the Gibraltar Open final. At the World Snooker Championship, his 10–8 victory over Yan Bingtao earned him a place in the second round, where he was defeated by Ronnie O'Sullivan 13–7.

=== 2017–18 season ===
Murphy reached the final of the China Championship in August, with victories over Zhang Anda, Ken Doherty, Anthony Hamilton, Stephen Maguire, Zhou Yuelong and Ali Carter, but he was defeated 5–10 by Luca Brecel in the final. Later that month, he reached the second ranking tournament final of the season, the Paul Hunter Classic, this time losing 2–4 to Michael White. In November, he won the invitational Champion of Champions tournament for the first time, beating Mark King, White and Brecel on the way to the final, before claiming a 10–8 victory over Ronnie O'Sullivan. The pair faced each other again in the final of the UK Championship in December, but this time Murphy lost 5–10.

At the Masters, he avoided another first-round exit by beating Carter 6–4, though it was a hard-fought victory as Carter recovered from a 0–4 deficit to pull up to 4–5 behind. However, Murphy was knocked out of the tournament in the next round by Judd Trump, losing 4–6. He reached his third ranking final of the season at the Players Championship in March. After defeating Kyren Wilson, Anthony McGill and Mark Williams, he met Ronnie O'Sullivan in the final for the third time this season; trailing 3–6 at the end of the afternoon session, he eventually lost the match 4–10. At the end of the season, Murphy suffered another shocking first-round exit at the World Snooker Championship, losing 9–10 to Jamie Jones.

=== 2018–19 season ===
In December 2018, Murphy was defeated by world number 124 Chen Feilong in the first round of the UK Championship. Despite taking an early lead of 3–1, Murphy lost the next five frames and lost the match 3–6. He bounced back later that month and reached the final of the Scottish Open after winning against the likes of Michael Holt, Kyren Wilson and Judd Trump to face Mark Allen in the final. After trailing 3–6, Murphy won four frames out of the next five to level the match at 7–7, but Allen eventually claimed the title by winning 9–7. In January 2019, Murphy lost 2–6 to Barry Hawkins in the first round of the Masters. At the World Snooker Championship, Murphy whitewashed debutant Luo Honghao in the first round, winning 10–0, the joint biggest defeat in Crucible history. But he was knocked out of the tournament by Neil Robertson in the next round, losing 6–13.

=== 2019–20 season ===
In August 2019, Murphy won against the likes of Yuan Sijun, Yan Bingtao, Neil Robertson, Graeme Dott and Mark Allen to face Judd Trump in the final of the International Championship. After trailing 0–5 at the beginning, Murphy eventually lost the match 3–10. In September, Murphy also reached the final of the Shanghai Masters, an invitational tournament, after beating Lyu Haotian, Mark Williams, Jack Lisowski and Mark Allen. He suffered another defeat in the final against Ronnie O'Sullivan, this time losing 9–11. He defeated Williams in the final of the China Championship later that month and captured his first ranking title since winning the Gibraltar Open in March 2017. At the UK Championship, Murphy lost 4–6 to Eden Sharav in the first round, despite taking an early lead of 3–1. In January 2020, Murphy progressed to the semi-finals of the Masters for the first time since winning the title in 2015 after defeating Trump and Joe Perry, but he eventually lost 3–6 to Ali Carter. In February 2020, Murphy claimed his ninth ranking title after thrashing Kyren Wilson in the final of the Welsh Open. He made three century breaks and three more breaks over 70 to win 9–1. At the World Snooker Championship, Murphy had another first round exit after losing to Noppon Saengkham 4–10.

=== 2020–21 season ===
Murphy reached the semi-finals of the European Masters in September, knocking out the defending champion Neil Robertson at the quarter-final stage, but was then himself defeated 3–6 by Mark Selby. He made a quarter-final appearance at the Masters in January where he was defeated by the same scoreline by Stuart Bingham.

Defending his title at the Welsh Open in February, Murphy was defeated in the quarter-finals by Stephen Maguire in a ninth-frame decider after taking an earlier 4–3 lead. Murphy met Mark Selby in the final of the World Championship in a repeat of the European Masters semi-final seven months earlier; he lost 18–15. This was the fourth time that Murphy reached the final.

=== 2021–22 season ===
On 24 November, following his first-round loss to amateur player Si Jiahui in the 2021 UK Championship, Murphy commented, "he [Si] played like a man who does not have a care in the world, because he does not have a care in the world. It is not fair, it is not right. I am not picking on him as a young man, he deserved his victory. Amateurs should not be allowed in professional tournaments, the end. This is our livelihood. This is how I put food on the table. This is how I earn money. Since turning professional at 15, I have earned the right to call myself a professional snooker player. He hasn't done that. He shouldn't be on the table." He later regretted the timing of these comments and apologised to Si, revealing in 2023 that he was "in a dark place" at the time of his "out of character" outburst. The highlight of his season was reaching the semi-final of the 2022 Turkish Masters, where he lost 6–2 to Judd Trump.

=== 2022–23 season ===
Ahead of the 2022–23 season, Murphy revealed he had undergone gastric sleeve surgery after years of weight fluctuation and associated injuries, fat shaming on social media and a resurgence in over-eating after separating from his wife Elaine (although they later reconciled). He reached the quarter-finals of the UK Championship (for the first time since 2017) where he was defeated 6–1 by Lisowski. He advanced to the final of the 2023 Welsh Open where he lost 9–7 to Robert Milkins, before winning the Players Championship with a 10–4 win in the final over Carter. He made five centuries during the final including a highest break of 145 to seal his first ranking title since the 2020 Welsh Open. Just over a month later, he was victorious at the Tour Championship, defeating Kyren Wilson 10–7 in the final after being 0–4 behind.

On the eve of the World Championship, Murphy declared: "no one's playing better snooker than me right now", and was drawn against Si, a match which created anticipation due to the backdrop of previous comments Murphy had made about Si in 2021. Si won on a deciding frame to seal a 10–9 victory. Afterwards Murphy was gracious in defeat, saying Si had been "fabulous from start to finish" and "I threw everything at him, I tried my absolute best and I still lost."

=== 2023–24 season ===
In December, during the 2023 Snooker Shoot Out, Murphy became the first player to score a 147 maximum break in the tournament's history. It came in a contest against Bulcsú Révész, and fellow player Mark Allen described it as "Honestly one of the best things I've ever seen in snooker. Simply ridiculous." He beat Zhang Anda 6–2 and Lisowski 6–3 to reach the semi-final of the 2024 Masters. In his first Masters semi-final since 2020, Murphy was defeated 2‍–‍6 by O'Sullivan. At the 2024 World Championship, Murphy beat Lyu Haotian 10–5 in the first round, before losing 9‍–‍13 to Maguire in the last 16.

=== 2024–25 season: second Masters title ===
In August 2024, Murphy reached the final of the Shanghai Masters where he was defeated 11–5 by Judd Trump. At the 2025 Masters, Murphy hit a 147 break in his semi-final win over Mark Allen. Murphy went on to win the tournament with a 10–7 victory over Kyren Wilson in the final at Alexandra Palace. Murphy exited the 2025 World Championship at the second round stage. He was defeated 10–13 by Judd Trump.

=== 2025–26 season: British Open title ===
Murphy claimed his maiden British Open title in September after overcoming Anthony McGill 10–7 in the final. The following month, he reached another final, at the Xi'an Grand Prix, where he was defeated 3–10 by Mark Williams. In December, he reached the semi-finals of the UK Championship where he was eliminated by Mark Selby. The following month, his defence of his Masters crown came to an end when he was eliminated in the first round by Wu Yize. A few weeks later, Murphy reached the final of the German Masters where he was defeated 4–10 by Trump. At the Tour Championship, he was eliminated in the quarter-finals by Trump. Murphy progressed to the final of the 2026 World Championship with victories over Fan Zhengyi, Xiao Guodong, Zhao Xintong, and Higgins. He lost the final against Wu Yize 17–18 in a final-frame decider.

=== 2026–27 season ===
In his match against Matthew Selt at the 2026 China Open, Murphy scored 607 unanswered points, an all-time record on the World Snooker Tour. He also hit a record-equalling four consecutive centuries during their encounter. He defeated Trump in a final-frame decider in the quarter-finals of the English Open, but after leading his semi-final against Mark Williams 5–1, he lost five successive frames and the match. Murphy advanced to the semi-finals of the Champion of Champions by whitewashing O'Sullivan and Chang in the group stages. He was beaten in the last four by Kyren Wilson.

== Playing style ==
Murphy is noted for his straight cue action, which Steve Davis once called "the best cue action I've ever seen", as well as his long potting and breakbuilding. Phil Yates wrote in 2008 in The Times that Murphy has improved his tactical game since his World Championship victory. He has compiled more than 700 century breaks and has completed ten maximum breaks. His total career earnings are in excess of £4 million.

== Rivalry ==
Murphy has clashed with Stephen Maguire, another of the 2000 Young Players of Distinction, on several occasions. At the start of their 2004 Grand Prix match, there was an incident that resulted in Maguire being docked the opening frame. After they had shaken hands at the outset of the first frame, Maguire asked referee Johan Oomen for permission to leave the arena and retrieve his chalk, which he had forgotten. While Maguire was away, the referee and Murphy spoke before tournament director Mike Ganley arrived on the scene and docked Maguire a frame for technically not being ready to start at the scheduled time, which angered and surprised Maguire. Murphy refutes that the docking of the frame was down to him speaking to the referee. Maguire won the match 5–2 and later commented: "Rules are rules but I've never heard of anything like that happening before".

Further incidents came in subsequent years. During the 2006 World Championship, Maguire said "I don't want to be a fat world champion", a perceived reference to Murphy. After beating Murphy in the 2007 Welsh Open, Maguire said of the chalk incident, "That put the icing on the cake, but we've always had a rivalry. I dislike him and I think he dislikes me. I try hard to beat everyone, but it would have hurt more if I'd lost to him."

Murphy has been outspoken about several other of his rivals, criticising them for having too many toilet breaks and complaining about table conditions among other issues. Murphy has also made collective criticisms of his fellow professionals for not attending events, and has branded other players' concerns over prize money as "a joke".

== Personal life ==
Born in Harlow and raised in Irthlingborough, Murphy was home-schooled from age 13 after being bullied at school. His parents split up when he was 14, after which he lived with his father, Tony, a former professional golfer, and did not see his mother again until he was 19. During the 2007 World Championship, he revealed that he not spoken to his father, then a member of the World Snooker board, in over a year. In 2023, Murphy confirmed that they were still estranged.

During the 2004–05 season, Murphy moved to Whiston, a suburb of Rotherham, to live with his fiancée Clare Llewellyn, whom he married in July 2005. They separated in 2008. She filed for divorce the following year after The People newspaper revealed that Murphy had spent the night with an escort. His then-manager Brandon Parker confirmed that Murphy had spent the night with the woman, whom he had dated as a teenager, but stated that they did not have sex. Murphy subsequently said he had reconnected with the woman through Facebook after he separated from his wife but claimed he did not know she had become an escort. He subsequently dated Claire Chorlton, who attended the final of the 2012 UK Championship.

Murphy married Irish academic Elaine O'Reilly in June 2016 and they had two children together, a son and a daughter. They divorced in May 2023, with Murphy calling the split "amicable" and saying "our whole lives now become about raising our children". In January 2025, he appeared with musician Jo Rochell after he won the 2025 Masters. In November 2025, he and Rochell announced their engagement.

Murphy embraced Christianity at 15 after meeting a religious family on holiday. In his early career, he became known for his charitable work and donations, which included donating one-tenth of his 2005 World Championship winnings to his church and doing aid work in Zimbabwe with his first wife Clare. In 2021, he stated in an interview that his faith had diminished over time, saying it had always been "50/50 at best". In 2023, he referred to himself as an atheist.

Murphy was appointed Officer of the Order of the British Empire (OBE) in the 2026 Birthday Honours for services to snooker and charity.

== Performance and rankings timeline ==
Tournament	1998/ 99	1999/ 00	2000/ 01	2001/ 02	2002/ 03	2003/ 04	2004/ 05	2005/ 06	2006/ 07	2007/ 08	2008/ 09	2009/ 10	2010/ 11	2011/ 12	2012/ 13	2013/ 14	2014/ 15	2015/ 16	2016/ 17	2017/ 18	2018/ 19	2019/ 20	2020/ 21	2021/ 22	2022/ 23	2023/ 24	2024/ 25	2025/ 26	2026/ 27
Ranking (Note: From the 2010/2011 season it shows the ranking at the beginning of the season.)	(Note: New players on the Main Tour do not have a ranking)	(Note: He was not on the Main Tour.)			72	64	48	21	5	3	3	3	7	7	6	4	7	6	4	8	8	14	8	5	9	7	7	14	6
Ranking tournaments
Championship League	Tournament Not Held									Non-Ranking Event													2R	2R	2R	W	2R	RR	A
China Open (Note: The event was called the China International (1998/1999))	LQ	A	A	LQ	Not Held		LQ	1R	QF	F	QF	1R	SF	1R	SF	3R	QF	2R	QF	1R	LQ	Tournament Not Held							QF
Wuhan Open	Tournament Not Held																									LQ	QF	2R	1R
British Open	LQ	A	A	LQ	LQ	2R	SF	Tournament Not Held																1R	LQ	1R	1R	W	1R
English Open	Tournament Not Held																		2R	4R	3R	4R	2R	2R	3R	LQ	2R	3R	SF
Shenzhen Open (Note: The event was called the Xi'an Grand Prix (2024/2025–2025/2026))	Tournament Not Held																										2R	F	QF
Northern Ireland Open	Tournament Not Held																		1R	1R	1R	QF	1R	QF	2R	3R	QF	3R	1R
International Championship	Tournament Not Held														SF	1R	2R	3R	QF	3R	LQ	F	Not Held			1R	2R	QF	WD
UK Championship	LQ	A	A	LQ	WD	LQ	LQ	3R	2R	SF	W	2R	SF	QF	F	4R	4R	4R	SF	F	1R	1R	2R	1R	QF	1R	QF	SF	
Shoot-Out	Tournament Not Held												Non-Ranking Event						SF	1R	2R	4R	2R	2R	2R	2R	2R	2R	
Scottish Open (Note: The event was called the Players Championship (2003/2004))	LQ	A	A	LQ	1R	2R	Tournament Not Held								MR	Not Held			2R	1R	F	4R	3R	1R	1R	LQ	2R	2R	
German Masters	NR	Tournament Not Held											2R	SF	QF	3R	F	1R	LQ	SF	1R	SF	1R	2R	LQ	LQ	3R	F	
Welsh Open	LQ	A	A	LQ	LQ	LQ	LQ	F	QF	SF	QF	1R	1R	SF	1R	3R	2R	3R	2R	1R	2R	W	QF	2R	F	LQ	1R	1R	
World Grand Prix	Tournament Not Held																NR	W	QF	QF	1R	1R	1R	DNQ	SF	2R	SF	1R	
Players Championship (Note: The event was called the Players Tour Championship Grand Finals (2010/2011–2012/2013) and the Players Championship Grand Final (2013/2014–2015/2016))	Tournament Not Held												W	DNQ	DNQ	2R	2R	SF	1R	F	DNQ	SF	DNQ	DNQ	W	DNQ	QF	QF	
World Open (Note: The event was called the Grand Prix (1998/1999–2000/2001 and 2004/2005–2009/2010), the LG Cup (2001/2002–2003/2004) and the Haikou World Open (2011/2012–2013/2014))	LQ	A	A	LQ	LQ	3R	1R	3R	RR	SF	1R	1R	LQ	QF	2R	W	Not Held		QF	1R	LQ	2R	Not Held			3R	QF	3R	
Tour Championship	Tournament Not Held																				DNQ	QF	DNQ	DNQ	W	DNQ	1R	QF	
World Championship	LQ	LQ	LQ	1R	1R	LQ	W	QF	SF	2R	F	QF	2R	1R	QF	QF	F	1R	2R	1R	2R	1R	F	1R	1R	2R	2R	F	
Non-ranking tournaments
Shanghai Masters	Tournament Not Held									Ranking Event											WD	F	Not Held			2R	F	2R	QF
Champion of Champions	Tournament Not Held															1R	1R	1R	1R	W	SF	QF	1R	1R	A	QF	1R	1R	SF
Riyadh Season Championship	Tournament Not Held																									QF	2R	QF	
The Masters	LQ	LQ	1R	LQ	LQ	LQ	A	QF	QF	QF	1R	QF	1R	F	SF	SF	W	1R	1R	QF	1R	SF	QF	1R	QF	SF	W	1R	
Championship League	Tournament Not Held									SF	RR	RR	F	2R	RR	SF	WD	A	RR	WD	A	A	A	A	WD	A	A	A	
Former ranking tournaments
Thailand Masters	LQ	A	A	LQ	NR	Not Held			NR	Tournament Not Held																			
Irish Masters	Non-Ranking Event				LQ	LQ	LQ	NH	NR	Tournament Not Held																			
Northern Ireland Trophy	Tournament Not Held							NR	QF	SF	2R	Tournament Not Held																	
Bahrain Championship	Tournament Not Held										1R	Tournament Not Held																	
Wuxi Classic (Note: The event was called the Jiangsu Classic (2008/2009–2009/2010))	Tournament Not Held										Non-Ranking				1R	LQ	QF	Tournament Not Held											
Australian Goldfields Open	Tournament Not Held													SF	QF	2R	2R	1R	Tournament Not Held										
Shanghai Masters	Tournament Not Held									1R	1R	SF	2R	QF	SF	2R	2R	2R	1R	LQ	NR		Not Held			Non-Ranking Event			
Paul Hunter Classic (Note: The event was called the Grand Prix Fürth (2004/2005) and the Fürth German Open (2005/2006–2006/2007))	Tournament Not Held						Pro-am Event						Minor-Ranking Event						A	F	1R	NR	Tournament Not Held						
Indian Open	Tournament Not Held															LQ	A	NH	SF	3R	2R	Tournament Not Held							
Riga Masters (Note: The event was called the Riga Open (2014/2015–2015/2016))	Tournament Not Held																MR		A	LQ	2R	LQ	Tournament Not Held						
China Championship	Tournament Not Held																		NR	F	3R	W	Tournament Not Held						
WST Pro Series	Tournament Not Held																						2R	Tournament Not Held					
Turkish Masters	Tournament Not Held																							SF	Tournament Not Held				
Gibraltar Open	Tournament Not Held																	MR	W	WD	3R	A	3R	WD	Tournament Not Held				
WST Classic	Tournament Not Held																								2R	Tournament Not Held			
European Masters (Note: The event was called the Irish Open (1998/1999) and Malta Cup (2004/2005–2007/2008))	LQ	Not Held		LQ	LQ	LQ	1R	2R	W	NR	Tournament Not Held								1R	LQ	LQ	LQ	SF	1R	3R	3R	Not Held		
Saudi Arabia Masters	Tournament Not Held																										SF	6R	NH
Former non-ranking tournaments
Masters Qualifying Event (Note: The event was also called the Benson & Hedges Championship (1990/1991–2002/2003))	3R	2R	W	SF	2R	3R	NH	A	A	A	A	A	Tournament Not Held																
Northern Ireland Trophy	Tournament Not Held							QF	Ranking Event			Tournament Not Held																	
Pot Black	Tournament Not Held							F	QF	F	Tournament Not Held																		
European Open	Not Held			Ranking Event						W	Tournament Not Held								Ranking Event										
World Series Jersey	Tournament Not Held										SF	Tournament Not Held																	
World Series Berlin	Tournament Not Held										F	Tournament Not Held																	
World Series Grand Final	Tournament Not Held										W	Tournament Not Held																	
World Series Killarney	Tournament Not Held											W	Tournament Not Held																
Hainan Classic	Tournament Not Held												RR	Tournament Not Held															
Wuxi Classic	Tournament Not Held										RR	SF	W	SF	Ranking Event			Tournament Not Held											
Brazil Masters	Tournament Not Held													W	Tournament Not Held														
Power Snooker	Tournament Not Held												SF	1R	Tournament Not Held														
Premier League	A	A	A	A	A	A	A	RR	A	A	A	W	F	RR	RR	Tournament Not Held													
World Grand Prix	Tournament Not Held																1R	Ranking Event											
General Cup	Tournament Not Held						A	Tournament Not Held				A	NH	A	A	RR	F	A	Tournament Not Held										
Shoot-Out	Tournament Not Held												1R	1R	1R	2R	QF	2R	Ranking Event										
China Championship	Tournament Not Held																		SF	Ranking Event			Tournament Not Held						
Hong Kong Masters	Tournament Not Held																			QF	Tournament Not Held				A	Tournament Not Held			
Six-red World Championship (Note: The event was called the Six-red Snooker International (2008/2009) and the Six-red World Grand Prix (2009/2010))	Tournament Not Held										A	2R	A	NH	F	QF	QF	A	A	A	A	A	Not Held		WD	Tournament Not Held			

Performance Table Legend
LQ	lost in the qualifying draw	#R	lost in the early rounds of the tournament (WR = Wildcard round, RR = Round robin)	QF	lost in the quarter-finals
SF	lost in the semi-finals	F	lost in the final	W	won the tournament
DNQ	did not qualify for the tournament	A	did not participate in the tournament	WD	withdrew from the tournament

NH / Not Held	means an event was not held.
NR / Non-Ranking Event	means an event is/was no longer a ranking event.
R / Ranking Event	means an event is/was a ranking event.
MR / Minor-Ranking Event	means an event is/was a minor-ranking event.
PA / Pro-am Event	means an event is/was a pro-am event.

== Career finals ==
=== Ranking finals: 30 (13 titles) ===
Legend
World Championship (1–4)
UK Championship (1–2)
Other (11–11)

Outcome	No.	Year	Championship	Opponent in the final	Score	Ref.
Winner	1.	2005	World Snooker Championship	(Wales) Matthew Stevens	18–16	
Runner-up	1.	2006	Welsh Open	(England) Stephen Lee	4–9	
Winner	2.	2007	Malta Cup	(Wales) Ryan Day	9–4	
Runner-up	2.	2008	China Open	(Scotland) Stephen Maguire	9–10	
Winner	3.	2008	UK Championship	(Hong Kong) Marco Fu	10–9	
Runner-up	3.	2009	World Snooker Championship	(Scotland) John Higgins	9–18	
Winner	4.	2011	Players Tour Championship Finals	(England) Martin Gould	4–0	
Runner-up	4.	2012	UK Championship	(England) Mark Selby	6–10	
Winner	5.	2014	World Open	(England) Mark Selby	10–6	
Runner-up	5.	2015	German Masters	(England) Mark Selby	7–9	
Runner-up	6.	2015	World Snooker Championship (2)	(England) Stuart Bingham	15–18	
Winner	6.	2016	World Grand Prix	(England) Stuart Bingham	10–9	
Winner	7.	2017	Gibraltar Open	(England) Judd Trump	4–2	
Runner-up	7.	2017	China Championship	(Belgium) Luca Brecel	5–10	
Runner-up	8.	2017	Paul Hunter Classic	(Wales) Michael White	2–4	
Runner-up	9.	2017	UK Championship (2)	(England) Ronnie O'Sullivan	5–10	
Runner-up	10.	2018	Players Championship	(England) Ronnie O'Sullivan	4–10	
Runner-up	11.	2018	Scottish Open	(Northern Ireland) Mark Allen	7–9	
Runner-up	12.	2019	International Championship	(England) Judd Trump	3–10	
Winner	8.	2019	China Championship	(Wales) Mark Williams	10–9	
Winner	9.	2020	Welsh Open	(England) Kyren Wilson	9–1	
Runner-up	13.	2021	World Snooker Championship (3)	(England) Mark Selby	15–18	
Runner-up	14.	2023	Welsh Open (2)	(England) Robert Milkins	7–9	
Winner	10.	2023	Players Championship (2)	(England) Ali Carter	10–4	
Winner	11.	2023	Tour Championship	(England) Kyren Wilson	10–7	
Winner	12.	2023	Championship League	(Wales) Mark Williams	3–0	
Winner	13.	2025	British Open	(Scotland) Anthony McGill	10–7	
Runner-up	15.	2025	Xi'an Grand Prix	(Wales) Mark Williams	3–10	
Runner-up	16.	2026	German Masters (2)	(England) Judd Trump	4–10	
Runner-up	17.	2026	World Snooker Championship (4)	(China) Wu Yize	17–18	

=== Minor-ranking finals: 6 (4 titles) ===
Outcome	No.	Year	Championship	Opponent in the final	Score	Ref.
Winner	1.	2010	Brugge Open	(England) Matthew Couch	4–2	
Runner-up	1.	2010	Ruhr Championship	(Scotland) John Higgins	2–4	
Winner	2.	2014	Gdynia Open	(Republic of Ireland) Fergal O'Brien	4–1	
Winner	3.	2014	Bulgarian Open	(England) Martin Gould	4–2	
Winner	4.	2014	Ruhr Open	(England) Robert Milkins	4–0	
Runner-up	2.	2015	Paul Hunter Classic	(England) Ali Carter	3–4	

=== Non-ranking finals: 25 (12 titles) ===
Legend
The Masters (2–1)
Champion of Champions (1–0)
Premier League (1–1)
Other (8–11)

Outcome	No.	Year	Championship	Opponent in the final	Score	Ref.
Runner-up	1.	1998	UK Tour – Event 4	(Northern Ireland) Patrick Wallace	4–6	
Winner	1.	2000	Benson & Hedges Championship	(England) Stuart Bingham	9–7	
Winner	2.	2001	Challenge Tour – Event 3	(England) Andrew Norman	6–3	
Winner	3.	2001	Challenge Tour – Event 4	(England) Luke Simmonds	6–2	
Runner-up	2.	2001	WPBSA Open Tour – Event 1	(England) Mark Gray	2–5	
Runner-up	3.	2005	Pot Black	(Wales) Matthew Stevens	0–1	
Runner-up	4.	2007	Pot Black (2)	(Republic of Ireland) Ken Doherty	0–1	
Winner	4.	2008	Malta Cup	(Republic of Ireland) Ken Doherty	9–3	
Runner-up	5.	2008	World Series of Snooker Berlin	(Scotland) Graeme Dott	1–6	
Winner	5.	2009	World Series of Snooker Grand Final	(Scotland) John Higgins	6–2	
Winner	6.	2009	World Series of Snooker Killarney	(England) Jimmy White	5–1	
Winner	7.	2009	Premier League	(England) Ronnie O'Sullivan	7–3	
Winner	8.	2010	Wuxi Classic	(China) Ding Junhui	9–8	
Runner-up	6.	2010	Premier League	(England) Ronnie O'Sullivan	1–7	
Runner-up	7.	2011	Championship League	(Wales) Matthew Stevens	1–3	
Winner	9.	2011	Brazil Masters	(Scotland) Graeme Dott	5–0	
Runner-up	8.	2012	The Masters	(Australia) Neil Robertson	6–10	
Runner-up	9.	2012	Six-red World Championship	(England) Mark Davis	4–8	
Runner-up	10.	2014	General Cup	(England) Ali Carter	6–7	
Winner	10.	2015	The Masters	(Australia) Neil Robertson	10–2	
Winner	11.	2017	Champion of Champions	(England) Ronnie O'Sullivan	10–8	
Runner-up	11.	2019	Shanghai Masters	(England) Ronnie O'Sullivan	9–11	
Runner-up	12.	2024	Shanghai Masters (2)	(England) Judd Trump	5–11	
Winner	12.	2025	The Masters (2)	(England) Kyren Wilson	10–7	
Runner-up	13.	2025	Helsinki Super Shootout	(Wales) Mark Williams	0–1	

=== Pro-am finals: 3 (2 titles) ===
Outcome	No.	Year	Championship	Opponent in the final	Score	Ref.
Runner-up	1.	1999	Hannover International Masters	(England) Matthew Couch	5–6	
Winner	1.	2008	Paul Hunter Classic	(England) Mark Selby	4–0	
Winner	2.	2009	Paul Hunter Classic (2)	(England) Jimmy White	4–0	

=== Amateur finals: 6 (5 titles) ===
Outcome	No.	Year	Championship	Opponent in the final	Score	Ref.
Winner	1.	1995	UK Under-15 Championship	(England) Lee Spick	3–2	
Winner	2.	1996	English Under-15 Championship	(England) Stuart Roper	4–2	
Winner	3.	1996	UK Under-15 Championship (2)	(England) Ricky Walden	3–2	
Winner	4.	1997	UK Under-15 Championship (3)	(Wales) Ian Preece	3–0	
Runner-up	1.	1998	English Under-21 Championship	(England) Robert Donkin	1–6	
Winner	5.	2000	English Open	(England) Brian Salmon	8–1	
