= 2009 Championship League =

Championship League

Tournament information
- Dates: 5 January – 26 March 2009
- Venue: Crondon Park Golf Club
- City: Stock
- Country: England
- Organisation: Matchroom Sport
- Format: Non-ranking event
- Total prize fund: £175,600
- Winner's share: £10,000 (plus bonuses)
- Highest break: Mark Selby (ENG) (145)

Final
- Champion: Judd Trump (ENG)
- Runner-up: Mark Selby (ENG)
- Score: 3–2

The 2009 Championship League was a professional non-ranking snooker tournament that was played from 5 January to 26 March 2009 at the Crondon Park Golf Club in Stock, England.

Judd Trump won in the final 3–2 against Mark Selby, and earned a place in the 2009 Premier League Snooker.

== Prize fund ==
The breakdown of prize money for this year is shown below:

- Group 1–7
  - Winner: £3,000
  - Runner-up: £2,000
  - Semi-final: £1,000
  - Frame-win in league stage: £100
  - Frame-win in play-offs: £300
- Winners group
  - Winner: £10,000
  - Runner-up: £5,000
  - Semi-final: £3,000
  - Frame-win in league stage: £200
  - Frame-win in play-offs: £300

- Tournament total: £175,600

== Group one ==
Group one matches were played on 5 and 6 January 2009. Mark Selby was the first player to qualify for the winners group.

=== Matches ===
- Joe Perry 2–2 Ryan Day
- Mark Selby 2–2 Ali Carter
- Shaun Murphy 2–2 Stephen Hendry
- Ding Junhui 3–1 Joe Perry
- Ryan Day 1–3 Mark Selby
- Ali Carter 2–2 Shaun Murphy
- Stephen Hendry 1–3 Ding Junhui
- Joe Perry 1–3 Mark Selby
- Ryan Day 2–2 Ali Carter
- Shaun Murphy 1–3 Ding Junhui
- Mark Selby 2–2 Ding Junhui
- Stephen Hendry 2–2 Ali Carter
- Joe Perry 2–2 Stephen Hendry
- Ryan Day 1–3 Shaun Murphy
- Ali Carter 1–3 Ding Junhui
- Mark Selby 1–3 Stephen Hendry
- Joe Perry 4–0 Shaun Murphy
- Ryan Day 1–3 Ding Junhui
- Ryan Day 3–1 Stephen Hendry
- Shaun Murphy 2–2 Mark Selby
- Joe Perry 2–2 Ali Carter

=== Table ===
Pos	Player	Pld	W	D	L	Pts	FF	FA	FD	
1	Ding Junhui (CHN)	6	5	1	0	11	17	7	+10	Qualification to Group 1 play-off
2	Mark Selby (ENG)	6	2	3	1	7	13	11	+2	Qualification to Group 1 play-off
3	Joe Perry (ENG)	6	1	3	2	5	12	12	0	Qualification to Group 1 play-off
4	Ali Carter (ENG)	6	0	5	1	5	11	13	−2	Qualification to Group 1 play-off
5	Stephen Hendry (SCO)	6	1	3	2	5	11	13	−2	Advances into Group 2
6	Shaun Murphy (ENG)	6	1	3	2	5	10	14	−4	Eliminated from the competition
7	Ryan Day (WAL)	6	1	2	3	4	10	14	−4	Eliminated from the competition

Source: ^{[usurped]}

=== Play-offs ===
Semi-finals; Best of 5 frames
1	Ding Junhui (CHN)	2
4	Ali Carter (ENG)	3
2	Mark Selby (ENG)	3
3	Joe Perry (ENG)	0

Final; Best of 5 frames
4	Ali Carter (ENG)	1
2	Mark Selby (ENG)	3

== Group two ==
Group two matches were played on 7 and 8 January 2009. Mark Allen was the second player to qualify for the winners group.

=== Matches ===
- Ali Carter 1–3 Ding Junhui
- Joe Perry 3–1 Stephen Hendry
- Mark Allen 3–1 Peter Ebdon
- Mark Williams 1–3 Ali Carter
- Ding Junhui 3–1 Joe Perry
- Stephen Hendry 3–1 Mark Allen
- Peter Ebdon 1–3 Mark Williams
- Ali Carter 3–1 Joe Perry
- Ding Junhui 4–0 Stephen Hendry
- Mark Allen 2–2 Mark Williams
- Joe Perry 2–2 Mark Williams
- Peter Ebdon 1–3 Stephen Hendry
- Ali Carter 3–1 Peter Ebdon
- Ding Junhui 2–2 Mark Allen
- Stephen Hendry 2–2 Mark Williams
- Joe Perry 3–1 Peter Ebdon
- Ali Carter 1–3 Mark Allen
- Ding Junhui 2–2 Mark Williams
- Joe Perry 2–2 Mark Allen
- Ding Junhui 3–1 Peter Ebdon
- Ali Carter 3–1 Stephen Hendry

=== Table ===
Pos	Player	Pld	W	D	L	Pts	FF	FA	FD	
1	Ding Junhui (CHN)	6	4	2	0	10	17	7	+10	Qualification to Group 2 play-off
2	Ali Carter (ENG)	6	4	0	2	8	14	10	+4	Qualification to Group 2 play-off
3	Mark Allen (NIR)	6	2	3	1	7	13	11	+2	Qualification to Group 2 play-off
4	Joe Perry (ENG)	6	2	2	2	6	12	12	0	Qualification to Group 2 play-off
5	Mark Williams (WAL)	6	1	4	1	6	12	12	0	Advances into Group 3
6	Stephen Hendry (SCO)	6	2	1	3	5	10	14	−4	Eliminated from the competition
7	Peter Ebdon (ENG)	6	0	0	6	0	6	18	−12	Eliminated from the competition

Source: ^{[usurped]}

=== Play-offs ===
Semi-finals; Best of 5 frames
1	Ding Junhui (CHN)	1
4	Joe Perry (ENG)	3
2	Ali Carter (ENG)	1
3	Mark Allen (NIR)	3

Final; Best of 5 frames
4	Joe Perry (ENG)	2
3	Mark Allen (NIR)	3

== Group three ==
Group three matches were played on 9 and 10 February 2009. Joe Perry was the third player to qualify for the winners group.

=== Matches ===
- Joe Perry 1–3 Ding Junhui
- Ali Carter 2–2 Mark Williams
- John Higgins 1–3 Neil Robertson
- Barry Hawkins 2–2 Joe Perry
- Ding Junhui 2–2 Ali Carter
- Mark Williams 2–2 John Higgins
- Neil Robertson 2–2 Barry Hawkins
- Joe Perry 2–2 Ali Carter
- Ding Junhui 1–3 Mark Williams
- John Higgins 1–3 Barry Hawkins
- Ali Carter 3–1 Barry Hawkins
- Neil Robertson 2–2 Mark Williams
- Joe Perry 3–1 Neil Robertson
- Ding Junhui 2–2 John Higgins
- Mark Williams 3–1 Barry Hawkins
- Ali Carter 1–3 Neil Robertson
- John Higgins 2–2 Joe Perry
- Ding Junhui 1–3 Barry Hawkins
- Ali Carter 1–3 John Higgins
- Neil Robertson 4–0 Ding Junhui
- Joe Perry 2–2 Mark Williams

=== Table ===
Pos	Player	Pld	W	D	L	Pts	FF	FA	FD	
1	Neil Robertson (AUS)	6	3	2	1	8	15	9	+6	Qualification to Group 3 play-off
2	Mark Williams (WAL)	6	2	4	0	8	14	10	+4	Qualification to Group 3 play-off
3	Barry Hawkins (ENG)	6	2	2	2	6	12	12	0	Qualification to Group 3 play-off
4	Joe Perry (ENG)	6	1	4	1	6	12	12	0	Qualification to Group 3 play-off
5	John Higgins (SCO)	6	1	3	2	5	11	13	−2	Advances into Group 4
6	Ali Carter (ENG)	6	1	3	2	5	11	13	−2	Eliminated from the competition
7	Ding Junhui (CHN)	6	1	2	3	4	9	15	−6	Eliminated from the competition

Source: ^{[usurped]}

=== Play-offs ===
Semi-finals; Best of 5 frames
1	Neil Robertson (AUS)	1
4	Joe Perry (ENG)	3
2	Mark Williams (WAL)	3
3	Barry Hawkins (ENG)	1

Final; Best of 5 frames
4	Joe Perry (ENG)	3
2	Mark Williams (WAL)	0

== Group four ==
Group four matches were played on 11 and 12 February 2009. Stuart Bingham was the fourth player to qualify for the winners group.

=== Matches ===
- Mark Williams 2–2 Neil Robertson
- Barry Hawkins 1–3 John Higgins
- Dave Harold 0–4 Stuart Bingham
- Jamie Cope 3–1 Mark Williams
- John Higgins 4–0 Dave Harold
- Neil Robertson 0–4 Barry Hawkins
- Jamie Cope 3–1 Stuart Bingham
- Barry Hawkins 3–1 Mark Williams
- Neil Robertson 0–4 John Higgins
- Dave Harold 2– 2 Jamie Cope
- Barry Hawkins 0–4 Jamie Cope
- John Higgins 2–2 Stuart Bingham
- Mark Williams 3–1 Stuart Bingham
- Neil Robertson 4–0 Dave Harold
- John Higgins 2–2 Jamie Cope
- Barry Hawkins 2–2 Stuart Bingham
- Mark Williams 3–1 Dave Harold
- Neil Robertson 2–2 Jamie Cope
- Barry Hawkins 2–2 Dave Harold
- Neil Robertson 1–3 Stuart Bingham
- Mark Williams 2–2 John Higgins

=== Table ===
Pos	Player	Pld	W	D	L	Pts	FF	FA	FD	
1	John Higgins (SCO)	6	3	3	0	9	17	7	+10	Qualification to Group 4 play-off
2	Jamie Cope (ENG)	6	3	3	0	9	16	8	+8	Qualification to Group 4 play-off
3	Stuart Bingham (ENG)	6	2	2	2	6	13	11	+2	Qualification to Group 4 play-off
4	Barry Hawkins (ENG)	6	2	2	2	6	12	12	0	Qualification to Group 4 play-off
5	Mark Williams (WAL)	6	2	2	2	6	12	12	0	Advances into Group 5
6	Neil Robertson (AUS)	6	1	2	3	4	9	15	−6	Eliminated from the competition
7	Dave Harold (ENG)	6	0	2	4	2	5	19	−14	Eliminated from the competition

Source: ^{[usurped]}

=== Play-offs ===
Semi-finals; Best of 5 frames
1	John Higgins (SCO)	3
4	Barry Hawkins (ENG)	2
2	Jamie Cope (ENG)	1
3	Stuart Bingham (ENG)	3

Final; Best of 5 frames
1	John Higgins (SCO)	1
3	Stuart Bingham (ENG)	3

== Group five ==
Group five matches were played on 2 and 3 March 2009. Mark King was the fifth player to qualify for the winners group.

=== Matches ===
- John Higgins 1–3 Jamie Cope
- Barry Hawkins 1–3 Mark Williams
- Mark King 2–2 Matthew Stevens
- Ken Doherty 1–3 John Higgins
- Jamie Cope 2–2 Barry Hawkins
- Mark Williams 1–3 Mark King
- Matthew Stevens 1–3 Ken Doherty
- John Higgins 1–3 Barry Hawkins
- Jamie Cope 3–1 Mark Williams
- Mark King 2–2 Ken Doherty
- Barry Hawkins 0–4 Ken Doherty
- Matthews Stevens 3–1 Mark Williams
- John Higgins 2–2 Matthew Stevens
- Jamie Cope 2–2 Mark King
- Mark Williams 2–2 Ken Doherty
- Barry Hawkins 3–1 Matthew Stevens
- John Higgins 3–1 Mark King
- Jamie Cope 2–2 Ken Doherty
- Barry Hawkins 1–3 Mark King
- Jamie Cope 2–2 Matthew Stevens
- John Higgins 3–1 Mark Williams

=== Table ===
Pos	Player	Pld	W	D	L	Pts	FF	FA	FD	
1	Jamie Cope (ENG)	6	2	4	0	8	14	10	+4	Qualification to Group 5 play-off
2	Ken Doherty (IRL)	6	2	3	1	7	14	10	+4	Qualification to Group 5 play-off
3	John Higgins (SCO)	6	3	1	2	7	13	11	+2	Qualification to Group 5 play-off
4	Mark King (ENG)	6	2	3	1	7	13	11	+2	Qualification to Group 5 play-off
5	Matthew Stevens (WAL)	6	1	3	2	5	11	13	−2	Advances into Group 6
6	Barry Hawkins (ENG)	6	2	1	3	5	10	14	−4	Eliminated from the competition
7	Mark Williams (WAL)	6	1	1	4	3	9	15	−6	Eliminated from the competition

Source: ^{[usurped]}

=== Play-offs ===
Semi-finals; Best of 5 frames
1	Jamie Cope (ENG)	0
4	Mark King (ENG)	3
2	Ken Doherty (IRL)	3
3	John Higgins (SCO)	2

Final; Best of 5 frames
4	Mark King (ENG)	3
2	Ken Doherty (IRL)	1

== Group six ==
Group six matches were played on 4 and 5 March 2009. John Higgins was the sixth player to qualify for the winners group.

=== Matches ===
- Ken Doherty 1–3 Jamie Cope
- John Higgins 3–1 Joe Swail
- Matthew Stevens 2–2 Graeme Dott
- Steve Davis 3–1 Ken Doherty
- Jamie Cope 1–3 John Higgins
- Joe Swail 3–1 Matthew Stevens
- Graeme Dott 1–3 Steve Davis
- Ken Doherty 2–2 John Higgins
- Jamie Cope 3–1 Joe Swail
- Matthew Stevens 2–2 Steve Davis
- John Higgins 2–2 Steve Davis
- Graeme Dott 2–2 Joe Swail
- Ken Doherty 3–1 Graeme Dott
- Jamie Cope 0–4 Matthew Stevens
- Joe Swail 1–3 Steve Davis
- John Higgins 3–1 Graeme Dott
- Ken Doherty 2–2 Matthew Stevens
- Jamie Cope 1–3 Steve Davis
- John Higgins 1–3 Matthew Stevens
- Jamie Cope 0–4 Graeme Dott
- Ken Doherty 1–3 Joe Swail

=== Table ===
Pos	Player	Pld	W	D	L	Pts	FF	FA	FD	
1	Steve Davis (ENG)	6	4	2	0	10	16	8	+8	Qualification to Group 6 play-off
2	John Higgins (SCO)	6	3	2	1	8	14	10	+4	Qualification to Group 6 play-off
3	Matthew Stevens (WAL)	6	2	3	1	7	14	10	+4	Qualification to Group 6 play-off
4	Joe Swail (NIR)	6	2	1	3	5	11	13	−2	Qualification to Group 6 play-off
5	Graeme Dott (SCO)	6	1	2	3	4	11	13	−2	Advances into Group 7
6	Ken Doherty (IRL)	6	1	2	3	4	10	14	−4	Eliminated from the competition
7	Jamie Cope (ENG)	6	2	0	4	4	8	16	−8	Eliminated from the competition

Source: ^{[usurped]}

=== Play-offs ===
Semi-finals; Best of 5 frames
1	Steve Davis (ENG)	3
4	Joe Swail (NIR)	1
2	John Higgins (SCO)	3
3	Matthew Stevens (WAL)	1

Final; Best of 5 frames
1	Steve Davis (ENG)	0
2	John Higgins (SCO)	3

== Group seven ==
Group seven matches were played on 23 and 24 March 2009. Judd Trump was the last player to qualify for the winners group.

=== Matches ===
- Matthew Stevens 1–3 Steve Davis
- Joe Swail 2–2 Graeme Dott
- Ricky Walden 3–1 Liang Wenbo
- Judd Trump 0–4 Steve Davis
- Matthew Stevens 3–1 Joe Swail
- Graeme Dott 1–3 Ricky Walden
- Liang Wenbo 1–3 Judd Trump
- Steve Davis 1–3 Joe Swail
- Matthew Stevens 0–4 Graeme Dott
- Ricky Walden 1–3 Judd Trump
- Joe Swail 1–3 Judd Trump
- Liang Wenbo 2–2 Graeme Dott
- Steve Davis 4–0 Liang Wenbo
- Matthew Stevens 0–4 Ricky Walden
- Graeme Dott 1–3 Judd Trump
- Joe Swail 2–2 Liang Wenbo
- Steve Davis 2–2 Ricky Walden
- Matthew Stevens 1–3 Judd Trump
- Joe Swail 1–3 Ricky Walden
- Matthew Stevens 2–2 Liang Wenbo
- Steve Davis 2–2 Graeme Dott

=== Table ===
Pos	Player	Pld	W	D	L	Pts	FF	FA	FD	
1	Judd Trump (ENG)	6	5	0	1	10	15	9	+6	Qualification to Group 7 play-off
2	Ricky Walden (ENG)	6	4	1	1	9	16	8	+8	Qualification to Group 7 play-off
3	Steve Davis (ENG)	6	3	2	1	8	16	8	+8	Qualification to Group 7 play-off
4	Graeme Dott (SCO)	6	1	3	2	5	12	12	0	Qualification to Group 7 play-off
5	Joe Swail (NIR)	6	1	2	3	4	10	14	−4	Eliminated from the competition
6	Liang Wenbo (CHN)	6	0	3	3	3	8	16	−8	Eliminated from the competition
7	Matthew Stevens (WAL)	6	1	1	4	3	7	17	−10	Eliminated from the competition

Source: ^{[usurped]}

=== Play-offs ===
Semi-finals; Best of 5 frames
1	Judd Trump (ENG)	3
4	Graeme Dott (SCO)	0
2	Ricky Walden (ENG)	3
3	Steve Davis (ENG)	2

Final; Best of 5 frames
1	Judd Trump (ENG)	3
2	Ricky Walden (ENG)	2

== Winners group ==
The matches of the winners group were played on 25 and 26 March 2009. Judd Trump has qualified for the 2009 Premier League.

=== Matches ===
- Mark Selby 3–1 Mark Allen
- Joe Perry 2–2 Stuart Bingham
- Mark King 1–3 John Higgins
- Judd Trump 1–3 Mark Selby
- Mark Allen 1–3 Joe Perry
- Stuart Bingham 3–1 Mark King
- John Higgins 2–2 Judd Trump
- Mark Selby 1–3 Joe Perry
- Mark Allen 2–2 Stuart Bingham
- Mark King 1–3 Judd Trump
- Joe Perry 1–3 Judd Trump
- John Higgins 1–3 Stuart Bingham
- Mark Selby 3–1 John Higgins
- Mark Allen 3–1 Mark King
- Stuart Bingham 2–2 Judd Trump
- Joe Perry 2–2 John Higgins
- Mark Allen 2–2 Judd Trump
- Mark Selby 4–0 Mark King
- Joe Perry 2–2 Mark King
- Mark Allen 0–4 John Higgins
- Mark Selby 3–1 Stuart Bingham

=== Table ===
Pos	Player	Pld	W	D	L	Pts	FF	FA	FD	
1	Mark Selby (ENG)	6	5	0	1	10	17	7	+10	Qualification to Winners' Group play-off
2	Judd Trump (ENG)	6	2	3	1	7	13	11	+2	Qualification to Winners' Group play-off
3	Stuart Bingham (ENG)	6	2	3	1	7	13	11	+2	Qualification to Winners' Group play-off
4	Joe Perry (ENG)	6	2	3	1	7	13	11	+2	Qualification to Winners' Group play-off
5	John Higgins (SCO)	6	2	2	2	6	13	11	+2	Eliminated from the competition
6	Mark Allen (NIR)	6	1	2	3	4	9	15	−6	Eliminated from the competition
7	Mark King (ENG)	6	0	1	5	1	6	18	−12	Eliminated from the competition

Source: ^{[usurped]}

=== Play-offs ===
Semi-finals; Best of 5 frames
1	Mark Selby (ENG)	3
4	Joe Perry (ENG)	2
2	Judd Trump (ENG)	3
3	Stuart Bingham (ENG)	2

Final; Best of 5 frames
1	Mark Selby (ENG)	2
2	Judd Trump (ENG)	3

== Century breaks ==
Total: 77

- 145, 133, 132, 122, 121, 113 – Mark Selby
- 144, 125, 106 – Barry Hawkins
- 137, 125, 125, 122, 108, 104 – Jamie Cope
- 136, 128, 125, 109, 108, 105, 102, 101 – Joe Perry
- 134, 127 – Stuart Bingham
- 134, 115, 101 – Ricky Walden
- 133, 131, 130, 125, 123, 123, 113,
  113, 109, 109, 106, 104, 103, 103 – John Higgins
- 133, 118, 113, 111, 104 – Judd Trump
- 133 – Liang Wenbo
- 132, 131, 125, 123, 122, 120, 117, 115, 105, 101 – Ding Junhui
- 131, 126, 114, 113 – Matthew Stevens
- 129 – Dave Harold
- 127, 115, 109 – Ken Doherty
- 127 – Mark Allen
- 121, 113, 101 – Ali Carter
- 118, 116 – Mark Williams
- 114 – Graeme Dott
- 106 – Stephen Hendry
- 106 – Steve Davis
- 105, 101 – Neil Robertson

== Winnings ==
No.	Player	1	2	3	4	5	6	7	W	TOTAL
1	Judd Trump (ENG)							6,300	14,400	20,700
2	Joe Perry (ENG)	2,200	4,700	6,000					6,200	19,100
3	John Higgins (SCO)			1,100	4,900	2,900	6,200		2,600	17,700
4	Mark Selby (ENG)	6,100							9,900	16,000
5	Stuart Bingham (ENG)				6,100				6,200	12,300
6	Ali Carter (ENG)	4,300	2,700	1,100						8,100
7	Mark Allen (NIR)		6,100						1,800	7,900
8	Steve Davis (ENG)						4,500	3,200		7,700
9	Mark Williams (WAL)		1,200	4,300	1,200	900				7,600
10	Mark King (ENG)					6,100			1,200	7,300
11	Ding Junhui (CHN)	3,300	3,000	900						7,200
12	Barry Hawkins (ENG)			2,500	2,800	1,000				6,300
13	Jamie Cope (ENG)				2,900	2,400	800			6,100
14	Ken Doherty (IRL)					4,600	1,000			5,600
15	Ricky Walden (ENG)							5,100		5,100
16	Matthew Stevens (WAL)					1,100	2,700	700		4,500
17	Neil Robertson (AUS)			2,800	900					3,700
18	Joe Swail (NIR)						2,400	1,000		3,400
19	Graeme Dott (SCO)						1,100	2,200		3,300
20	Stephen Hendry (SCO)	1,100	1,000							2,100
21	Shaun Murphy (ENG)	1,000								1,000
=	Ryan Day (WAL)	1,000								1,000
23	Liang Wenbo (CHN)							800		800
24	Peter Ebdon (ENG)		600							600
25	Dave Harold (ENG)				500					500
	Total prize money	19,000	19,300	18,700	19,300	19,000	18,700	19,300	42,300	175,600

Green: Won the group. All prize money in GBP.
Source=Championship League Snooker by Matchroom Sport
