= 2008 Paul Hunter Classic =

Tournament information
- Dates: 28–31 August 2008
- Venue: Stadthalle
- City: Fürth
- Country: Germany
- Format: Pro–am event

Final
- Champion: (England) Shaun Murphy
- Runner-up: (England) Mark Selby
- Score: 4–0

The 2008 Paul Hunter Classic was a pro–am snooker tournament held in August 2008. Barry Pinches was the reigning champion, but he was eliminated in the last 32 by Shaun Murphy. Murphy went on to win the tournament, defeating Mark Selby 4–0 in the final.

== Tournament structure ==
The initial stage began with 40 groups of 4 players. The winners of each group advanced to the last 32 stage of the tournament, and the tournament runners-up moved to the last 64. Shaun Murphy was the only professional not to top his group, and thus had to play two matches more than the other professional players.

== Main draw ==
Last 48; Best of 5 frames
(Belgium) Tim van Goubergen	1
(England) Shaun Murphy	3
(Wales) Lee Walker	3
(Germany) Phil Barnes	0
(Wales) Paul Davies	3
(England) Mark Davis	1
(England) David Roe	3
(Scotland) Marc Davis	1
(New Zealand) Chris McBreen	3
(Netherlands) Rene van Rijsbergen	1
(England) Ricky Walden	3
(Netherlands) Alain Vandersteen	0
(England) David Gray	3
(Germany) Mike Henson	0
(Malta) Alex Borg	3
(Belgium) Luca Brecel	1
(England) Michael Wild	0
(Belgium) Hans Blanckaert	3
(England) Mark Selby	3
(Germany) Sascha Lippe	1
(Netherlands) Stefan Mazrocis	3
(Netherlands) Misja van Vonderen	1
(England) Jimmy Michie	3
(Germany) Karl-Heinz Beggel	0
(England) Rod Lawler	2
(Germany) Lasse Münstermann	3
(England) Tom Ford	3
(Netherlands) Joris Maas	1
(England) Rory McLeod	3
(Belgium) Jurgen van Roy	1
(Republic of Ireland) Richard McHugh	1
(England) Munraj Pal	3

Last 32; Best of 5 frames
(England) Barry Pinches	2
(England) Shaun Murphy	3
(Northern Ireland) Gerard Greene	3
(Wales) Lee Walker	1
(England) Jamie Cope	2
(Wales) Paul Davies	3
(England) Stuart Bingham	3
(England) David Roe	0
(England) Joe Perry	3
(New Zealand) Chris McBreen	1
(England) Steve Davis	1
(England) Ricky Walden	3
(Republic of Ireland) Michael Judge	3
(England) David Gray	0
(Australia) Neil Robertson	3
(Malta) Alex Borg	0
(Wales) Ryan Day	3
(Belgium) Hans Blanckaert	0
(England) Michael Holt	1
(England) Mark Selby	3
(England) Mark King	3
(Netherlands) Stefan Mazrocis	1
(England) Nigel Bond	3
(England) Jimmy Michie	1
(Wales) Matthew Stevens	0
(Germany) Lasse Münstermann	3
(Wales) Mark Williams	3
(England) Tom Ford	1
(England) Jimmy White	3
(England) Rory McLeod	0
(Germany) Wolfgang Brandmeier	0
(England) Munraj Pal	3

Last 16; Best of 5 frames
(England) Shaun Murphy	3
(Northern Ireland) Gerard Greene	0
(Wales) Paul Davies	0
(England) Stuart Bingham	3
(England) Joe Perry	0
(England) Ricky Walden	3
(Republic of Ireland) Michael Judge	3
(Australia) Neil Robertson	1
(Wales) Ryan Day	1
(England) Mark Selby	3
(England) Mark King	1
(England) Nigel Bond	3
(Germany) Lasse Münstermann	3
(Wales) Mark Williams	0
(England) Jimmy White	3
(England) Munraj Pal	1

Quarter-finals; Best of 5 frames
(England) Shaun Murphy	3
(England) Stuart Bingham	1
(England) Ricky Walden	3
(Republic of Ireland) Michael Judge	1
(England) Mark Selby	3
(England) Nigel Bond	2
(Germany) Lasse Münstermann	0
(England) Jimmy White	3

Semi-finals; Best of 5 frames
(England) Shaun Murphy	3
(England) Ricky Walden	2
(England) Mark Selby	3
(England) Jimmy White	0

Final; Best of 7 frames
(England) Shaun Murphy	4
(England) Mark Selby	0
