= Centre for London =

UK think tank

- Predecessor: Demos
- Formation: 2011; 15 years ago
- Registration no.: Charity 1151435; Company 08414909
- Region served: Greater London
- Board of directors: Board of trustees (9 as of 2020)
- Budget: £1.2M (2019)
- Revenue: £1.2M (2019)
- Staff: 20 (2019)

Centre for London is London's think tank dedicated to public policy for London, as the capital of the United Kingdom. Based in the UK, it undertakes research and organises events aimed at developing solutions to the issues in London. The organisation considers itself politically independent.

The Centre is a registered charity. It is funded by a mixture of public, private and third sector supporters.

== About ==
=== History ===
Centre for London was founded in 2011 as a programme within Demos, a UK-based think tank. In 2013, the Centre was launched as an independent registered charity.

=== Board ===
The Centre's chair of trustees is Liz Peace, Chairman of the Old Oak and Park Royal Development Corporation. Other trustees include Ben Page, Chief Executive of Ipsos Mori and Mark Boleat, Deputy Chairman of the City of London Corporation's Policy and Resources Committee.

=== Senior leadership ===
Centre for London was founded by Ben Rogers, a writer on philosophy and history, former Cabinet Office strategist and member of the London Finance Commission. Rogers writes regularly for the Evening Standard, Financial Times and other papers. Richard Brown joined the Centre in 2014 as an Associate Director from the London Legacy Development Corporation, where he had been Strategy Director.

== Activities ==
Over the last seven years Centre for London has published over 50 policy reports, hosted over 100 public events, five major hustings and seven high-level conferences.

=== Skills and Work ===
The Centre has published several reports on good work, skills and the digital economy. In 2013, it published an influential report by Kitty Usher, arguing that the Mayor of London should be given the power to set a statutory minimum wage for the capital. A 2014 report by Charles Leadbeater coined the term "Endies" (short for Employed with No Disposable Income or Savings) in describing the large percentage of Londoners in work but struggling with the capital's high cost of living.

The Centre has also been known for its work on East London's digital economy, including A Tale of Tech City the first independent report on the East London digital cluster, —and Connecting Tech City, an initiative aimed at connecting local young people and London's digital firms. It also set up a digital platform -wearedotdotdot— that allows young people to find digital skills programmes and training opportunities in Tech City. In 2016, the Centre put forward recommendations for how the Mayor of London could support digital growth and innovation, including to introduce a chief digital officer, which Sadiq Khan committed to appointing on his election.

In 2018, the Centre published Human Capital, a report produced in association with Ernst & Young, which suggested that almost a third of London's jobs have high potential for automation. It found that London's economy and workers are well-placed to adapt but called on policymakers to think radically about their response to workforce change.

=== Housing ===
Much of Centre for London's work has focused on housing and the built environment. This includes reports looking at the role of the Thames Estuary in meeting London's housing needs.

The organisation has published a report, written by Andrew Adonis, advocating for a new town to be centred around Ebbsfleet.

Ahead of the 2016 London Mayoral Election, the Centre revealed how the housing crisis had changed the face of poverty and inequality in the capital. It also set out an ambitious reform agenda to transform south London's railway network. In recent years, its research has also focussed on estate densification, the barriers preventing councils from house building and the development opportunities at London's stations.

In May 2026, the centre advocated scrapping stamp duty in the United Kingdom and instead putting a levy on property wealth, on the basis that would free up homes, fund social housing and help renters save for deposits.

=== Transport and Pollution ===
In 2017, Centre for London convened an independent, expert commission to examine how London can best manage the conflicting pressures on its roads and streets, and tackle the problems of congestion, pollution, affordability and road safety. The Commission was chaired by Sir Malcolm Grant CBE, Chair of NHS England and was made up of senior experts, including Frank Kelly, Professor of Environmental Health, King's College London and Peter Jones OBE, Professor of Transport and Sustainable Development, University College London. Their final report, Street Smarts was published in October 2017 and was welcomed by Deputy Mayor of London for Transport, Val Shawcross.

=== Global Capital ===
In 2015 Centre for London collaborated with The Global Cities Initiative —a joint project of the Brookings Institution and JPMorgan Chase—on a number of events and publications, including Nations and the Wealth of Cities, by Greg Clark and the Rt Hon. Greg Clark MP.

Following the EU referendum result in 2016, Centre for London published Open City in July 2017, which considered the challenges that Brexit poses for London's position as a global city and set out the most urgent areas for action. The Centre coordinated an open letter to Rt Hon David Davis MP to mark the report's launch, including signatories such as Lord Andrew Adonis, Sadiq Khan, Chuka Umunna MP and Helen Hayes. It continues its work to help London maintain its international prominence while also strengthening relations with the rest of the UK.

=== Events ===
Centre for London hosts an annual Conference - The London Conference.

== See also ==
- List of think tanks in the United Kingdom
