= Amateur professionalism =

Amateur professionalism or professional amateurism (shortened to pro-am) is a blurring of the distinction between professional and amateur within any endeavour or attainable skill that could be labelled professional in fields such as writing, computer programming, music or film. The idea was used by Demos, a British think tank, in the 2004 book The Pro-Am Revolution co-authored by writer Charles Leadbeater. Leadbeater has evangelized the idea (in "amateur professional" order this time) by presenting it at TEDGlobal 2005. The idea is distinct from the sports term "pro–am" (professional–amateur), though derived from it.

An example of professional amateurism on a large scale is the international open source and free software operating system project Linux which along with its many spinoffs has been developed by paid professionals at companies such as Red Hat, HP, and IBM working generally indistinguishably together with amateur professional coders.

Amateur professionalism occurs in populations that have more leisure time and live longer, allowing the pursuit of hobbies and other non-essential interests at a professional or near-professional knowledge- and skill-level. Am-pro fields today increasingly include astronomy, activism, sports equipment (e.g. in surfing and mountain biking), software engineering, education, and music production and distribution.

== See also ==
- Amateur
- Independent scholar
- Independent scientist
- Professional
- User innovation
