= 2009 Premier League Snooker =

PartyCasino.com Premier League
Tournament information
- Dates: 3 September – 29 November 2009
- Country: United Kingdom
- Organisation: Matchroom Sport
- Format: Non-ranking event
- Total prize fund: £200,000
- Winner's share: £30,000
- Highest break: Judd Trump (ENG) (139)

Final
- Champion: (England) Shaun Murphy
- Runner-up: (England) Ronnie O'Sullivan
- Score: 7–3

The 2009 PartyCasino.com Premier League was a professional non-ranking snooker tournament that was played from 3 September to 29 November 2009.

Shaun Murphy won in the final 7–3 against defending champion Ronnie O'Sullivan.

== Prize fund ==
The breakdown of prize money for this year is shown below:

- Winner: £30,000
- Runner-up: £15,000
- Semi-final: £5,000
- Frame-win: £1000
- Century break: £1,000 (only in league phase)
- Maximum break: £25,000
- Total: £200,000

== League phase ==
Ranking		(Scotland) HIG	(England) TRU	(England) OSU	(England) MUR	(Scotland) HEN	(Australia) ROB	(Hong Kong) FU	Frame W-L	Match W-D-L	Pld-Pts
1	John Higgins	x	4	4	4	3	4	3	22–14	4–2–0	6–10
2	Judd Trump	2	x	4	4	4	2	4	20–16	4–0–2	6–8
3	Ronnie O'Sullivan	2	2	x	4	3	3	4	18–18	2–2–2	6–6
4	Shaun Murphy	2	2	2	x	3	4	5	18–18	2–1–3	6–5
5	Stephen Hendry	3	2	3	3	x	5	1	17–19	1–3–2	6–5
6	Neil Robertson	2	4	3	2	1	x	4	16–20	2–1–3	6–5
7	Marco Fu	3	2	2	1	5	2	x	15–21	1–1–4	6–3

Top four qualified for the play-offs. If points were level then most frames won determined their positions. If two players had an identical record then the result in their match determined their positions. If that ended 3–3 then the player who got to three first was higher. (Breaks above 50 shown between (parentheses); century breaks are indicated with bold.)

- 3 September – Penrith Leisure Centre, Penrith, England
  - Neil Robertson 4–2 Judd Trump → 0–(139), (80)–7, (66)–(62), (58) 72–0, (89)–8, 34–75
  - Ronnie O'Sullivan 4–2 Marco Fu → 27–71, 66–4, (133)–4, (106) 115–6, (131) 135–0, 0–(83)
- 17 September – Malvern Theatres, Great Malvern, England
  - Shaun Murphy 2–4 John Higgins → 50–72, 73–24, (53)–77 (53), 28–70 (58), (72)–0, 18–92 (61)
  - Stephen Hendry 2–4 Judd Trump → (104) 117–0, (57, 68) 125–0, (51)–70, 29–51, 0–126(103), 0–(88)
- 24 September – Southampton Guildhall, Southampton, England
  - Neil Robertson 1–5 Stephen Hendry → 32–69 (60), 1–99 (98), 78–4, 19–52, 10–58 (51), 1–133 (127)
  - John Higgins 3–3 Marco Fu → (69)–8, 24–65, 60–52, 39–65, (90)–16, 46–66
- 1 October – Sands Centre, Carlisle, England
  - Marco Fu 2–4 Judd Trump → 19–(100), (82)–0, 25–75, 61–63, 6–(120), (81)–0
  - Ronnie O'Sullivan 3–3 Neil Robertson → (52) 75–48, 6–84 (77), (112) 113–14, 86–42, 0–117 (91), 4–72
- 15 October – AECC, Aberdeen, Scotland
  - Ronnie O'Sullivan 4–2 Shaun Murphy → (104)–0, 68–1, (56) 89–5, 0–101 (81), 45–84, (75) 85–5
  - John Higgins 3–3 Stephen Hendry → 54–65, 36–(76), (92)–0, (73) 92–0, 70–1, 5–71 (64)
- 22 October – Grimsby Auditorium, Grimsby, England
  - Ronnie O'Sullivan 3–3 Stephen Hendry → 1–75 (51), 38–65, (78)–0, 0–(76), (95) 99–0, 68–7
  - Shaun Murphy 5–1 Marco Fu → 1–117 (91), 63–14, (62) 88–5, (105)–0, (134)–0, (62) 92–7
- 29 October – Guildhall, Preston, England
  - John Higgins 4–2 Neil Robertson → 69–51, 41–66, 70–28, (73)–34, (63) 80–28, 17–50
  - Shaun Murphy 3–3 Stephen Hendry → 75–50, (55) 75–26, 4–110 (68), 6–100 (96), 54–19, 23–66
- 5 November – Riverside Leisure Centre, Devon, England
  - Marco Fu 2–4 Neil Robertson → 54–14, 19–84, 41–71, (90) 95–0, 63–70, 58–60
  - Ronnie O'Sullivan 2–4 Judd Trump → 33–80 (67), 93–8, 0–(79), 20–81 (50), 65–69, (50) 87–8
- 12 November – Hutton Moor Leisure Centre, Weston-super-Mare, England
  - John Higgins 4–2 Judd Trump → 7–35, (63)–(65), 40–65, (53) 88–79, (74) 78–5, (75) 107–1
  - Shaun Murphy 4–2 Neil Robertson → 68–37, (59) 75–99, (104) 119–6, (64) 73–8, 0–(109), 94–8
- 19 November – Venue Cymru, Llandudno, Wales
  - Marco Fu 5–1 Stephen Hendry → 64–40, (70)–25, 14–72, 98–15, 71–15, (122) 128–11
  - Ronnie O'Sullivan 2–4 John Higgins → 9–(72), 16–70 (64), (129) 134–0, 0–(107), 0–128 (119), (68) 76–48
  - Shaun Murphy 2–4 Judd Trump → 78–66, 11–64 (63), 39–63, 75–22, 43–57, 50–64

== Play-offs ==
28–29 November – Potters Leisure Resort, Hopton-on-Sea, England

Semi-finals; Best of 9 frames
1	(Scotland) John Higgins	3
4	(England) Shaun Murphy*	5
2	(England) Judd Trump	1
3	(England) Ronnie O'Sullivan**	5

Final; Best of 13 frames
4	(England) Shaun Murphy***	7
3	(England) Ronnie O'Sullivan	3

* (61) 80–35, 4–80, (96)–0, 0–(110), 34–77, 61–71 (65), 67–1, 40–75
** 0–(98), 10–99 (53), 10–68 (66), 1–83 (76), (63)–30, (53)–(67)
*** (111) 119–9, 87–36, 70–0, 50–57, 0–(88), 61–67, 75–27, (75) 126–3, (63)–0, (67) 75–(67)

== Qualifiers ==
The qualification for this tournament, the Championship League was played in eight groups from 5 January to 26 March 2009.

== Century breaks ==
- 139, 120, 103, 100 – Judd Trump
- 134, 110, 105, 104 – Shaun Murphy
- 133, 131, 129, 112, 106, 104 – Ronnie O'Sullivan
- 127, 111, 104 – Stephen Hendry
- 122 – Marco Fu
- 119, 107 – John Higgins
- 109 – Neil Robertson
