= 2008 Grand Prix (snooker) =

Royal London Watches Grand Prix

Tournament information
- Dates: 11–19 October 2008
- Venue: S.E.C.C.
- City: Glasgow
- Country: Scotland
- Organisation: WPBSA
- Format: Ranking event
- Total prize fund: £523,100
- Winner's share: £75,000
- Highest break: Marco Fu (HKG) (139)

Final
- Champion: John Higgins (SCO)
- Runner-up: Ryan Day (WAL)
- Score: 9–7

The 2008 Royal London Watches Grand Prix was a professional ranking snooker tournament that took place between 11 and 19 October 2008 at the S.E.C.C. in Glasgow, Scotland.

John Higgins won his first ranking event for 18 months by defeating Ryan Day 9–7 in the final.

== Prize fund ==
The breakdown of prize money for this year is shown below:

- Winner: £75,000
- Runner-up: £35,000
- Semi-final: £20,000
- Quarter-final: £12,000
- Last 16: £9,500
- Last 32: £7,100
- Last 48: £4,650
- Last 64: £2,200
- Stage one highest break: £500
- Stage two highest break: £4,000
- Stage one maximum break: £1,000
- Stage two maximum break: £20,000
- Total: £523,100

== Main draw ==
Matches on Sunday 12 October were played on a roll on/roll off basis. Play started at the allocated time each day with a 15-minute interval between matches. The third and fourth match did not start before 3pm. The evening session did not start before the time indicated on the format.

The draw for round one was made on completion of the qualifiers on 26 September 2008. The draw from round two up to and including the semi-finals was made on a random basis. The order of play and table numbers for all matches up to the semi-finals were determined once the draw for that round was made and published by the tournament director.

All matches up to and including the quarter-finals were best of 9 frames, semi-finals were best of 11 frames and the final was best of 17 frames. (Seedings in parentheses. All times are BST.)

=== Round one ===
- Saturday, 11 October – 12:00
  - (Scotland) John Higgins (6) 5–0 (England) Anthony Hamilton
  - (England) Joe Perry (13) 5–3 (England) Barry Hawkins
- Sunday, 12 October – 13:00
  - (Scotland) Stephen Hendry (7) 5– 4 (England) David Gilbert
  - (Australia) Neil Robertson (11) 4–5 (England) Steve Davis
- Sunday, 12 October – not before 15:00
  - (Hong Kong) Marco Fu (1) 5–2 (England) Jimmy Michie
  - (Northern Ireland) Mark Allen (16) 1–5 (England) Michael Holt
- Sunday, 12 October – 19:00
  - (Scotland) Graeme Dott (14) w/d-w/o (England) Judd Trump
  - (Wales) Ryan Day (9) 5–4 (England) Ricky Walden
- Monday, 13 October – 13:30
  - (Scotland) Stephen Maguire (3) 1–5 (England) Jamie Cope
  - (China) Ding Junhui (12) 5–0 (Scotland) Jamie Burnett
- Monday, 13 October – 19:00
  - (England) Mark Selby (5) 5–0 (England) Andrew Higginson
  - (England) Peter Ebdon (10) 5–1 (England) Simon Bedford
- Tuesday, 14 October – 13:30
  - (England) Ronnie O'Sullivan (2) 5–2 (China) Liang Wenbo
  - (England) Ali Carter (8) 5–4 (England) Dave Harold
- Tuesday, 14 October – 19:00
  - (England) Shaun Murphy (4) 3–5 (England) Adrian Gunnell
  - (England) Mark King (15) 3–5 (England) John Parrott

=== Round two ===
- Wednesday, 15 October – 14:00
  - (Scotland) John Higgins (6) 5–2 (Scotland) Stephen Hendry (7)
  - (China) Ding Junhui (12) 5–2 (England) Michael Holt
- Wednesday, 15 October – 19:00
  - (England) Adrian Gunnell 4–5 (England) Steve Davis
  - (England) Judd Trump 5–2 (England) Joe Perry (13)
- Thursday, 16 October – 13:30
  - (Hong Kong) Marco Fu (1) 1–5 (England) Ronnie O'Sullivan (2)
  - (England) Jamie Cope 5–4 (England) Peter Ebdon (10)
- Thursday, 16 October – 19:00
  - (England) Mark Selby (5) 4–5 (Wales) Ryan Day (9)
  - (England) John Parrott 0–5 (England) Ali Carter (8)

=== Quarter-finals ===
- Friday, 17 October – 13:30
  - (England) Judd Trump 5–4 (England) Ronnie O'Sullivan (2)
  - (England) Steve Davis 3–5 (England) Ali Carter (8)
- Friday, 17 October – 19:00
  - (China) Ding Junhui (12) 3–5 (Scotland) John Higgins (6)
  - (Wales) Ryan Day (9) 5–1 (England) Jamie Cope

=== Semi-finals ===
- Saturday, 18 October – 13:00
  - (Scotland) John Higgins (6) 6–4 (England) Judd Trump
- Saturday, 18 October – 19:30
  - (Wales) Ryan Day (9) 6–5 (England) Ali Carter (8)

== Final ==
Final: Best of 17 frames. Referee: Eirian Williams. S.E.C.C., Glasgow, Scotland, 19 October 2008.
John Higgins (6); Scotland	9–7	Ryan Day (9); Wales
Afternoon: 77–39, 86–47 (85), 24–89 (64), 90–0 (57), 73–1 (52), 4–119 (82), 69–21 (65); Evening: 79–4 (62), 63–52 (Day 52), 8–69 (69), 65–74, 0–89 (89), 46–61, 81–11 (50), 0–83 (83), 74–36 (53)
85	Highest break	89
0	Century breaks	0
7	50+ breaks	6

== Qualifying rounds ==
These matches took place from 22 to 25 September 2008 at the Pontin's Centre, Prestatyn, Wales.

Round 1 Best of 9 frames

== Century breaks ==
=== Qualifying stage centuries ===
- 140 – Aditya Mehta
- 135 – Peter Lines
- 128 – David Grace
- 121 – Anthony Hamilton
- 116 – Alan McManus
- 114, 102 – James McBain
- 114 – Jin Long
- 114 – David Gilbert
- 113, 100 – Adrian Gunnell
- 113 – Supoj Saenla
- 113 – Rory McLeod
- 112 – Jimmy White
- 109 – Paul Davies
- 109 – Liang Wenbo
- 105, 102 – Michael Holt
- 104, 102 – Simon Bedford
- 104 – Andrew Higginson
- 103 – Andrew Pagett
- 102 – Scott MacKenzie
- 101 – Rodney Goggins
- 100 – Tom Ford

=== Televised stage centuries ===
- 139, 116 – Marco Fu
- 135, 102, 100 – Mark Selby
- 134, 127 – John Higgins
- 129, 120, 115, 112, 104 – Ryan Day
- 129 – Ding Junhui
- 126 – Shaun Murphy
- 123 – David Gilbert
- 122, 100 – Peter Ebdon
- 111, 107, 107 – Ali Carter
- 105 – Michael Holt
- 105 – Adrian Gunnell
- 104 – Dave Harold
- 104 – Stephen Hendry
- 104, 103 – Ronnie O'Sullivan
- 103 – Ricky Walden
