= Pro–am =

Level of competition between amateur and professional

Pro–am (or pro/am, pro am, ProAm; a contraction of professional–amateur) refers to a sporting event where both professional career athletes and amateurs compete. It could also refer to a collaboration between professionals and amateurs in a scientific discipline such as astronomy.

== Overview ==
In reference to individuals, the term also has another meaning: it implies someone that is intermediate, indeterminate or fluctuating between amateur and professional status, an idea more related to the similar socio-economic term "amateur professionalism". A common synonym for this version of pro–am is semi-professional (semi-pro). Thus has the term pro–am long had various meanings and significances, depending upon the sport in question. Those who play at a highly competitive and strongly skilled level, but are not paid, are often called pro–ams. The term is also applied to competitors who do get paid in some events (e.g., tournaments with a cash prize) but who do not make a full-time living at the activity. In sports with a highly regulated system of professional qualifications and limitations, it may be applied to competitors whose careers move between professional and amateur status with their performance in any given season or string of seasons.

As an adjective, the term may also refer to an open contest or series of contests (e.g., "pro–am tournament", "pro–am tour") in which professionals and amateurs compete without distinction; those limited to "professional–amateur" players and barring full-time pros; or those of a semi-professional or minor league level, short of the top competitive ranks in the sport.

Pro–am competition is especially common in golf, and in track and field. Cue sports is another field in which pro–am play is common; an example in the open, mixed-play sense is the International Pool Tour in eight-ball. And in snooker, the International Open Series was a no-pros tour and a proving ground for amateurs aspiring to official pro qualification. Minor League Baseball, and its conceptual equivalents in other sports such as the AHL in North American ice hockey and Conference National play in English football, can also be seen as a form of well-organized pro–am play in the semi-professional sense. There are also a few pro-am tennis events, such as the annual Necker Cup organized by Richard Branson, where tennis pros are invited to compete against amateur enthusiasts. In dance sport, pro–am provides an opportunity for an amateur to take part in competitions with a professional partner. In this case, the teacher is usually also the dance partner. All of the most relevant international dance sport associations, including the World Dance Council, World DanceSport Federation, and International Dance Sport Association, offer pro–am competitions as parts of their international events. The world's oldest dance competition, the Blackpool Dance Festival, featured its first pro–am event in 2014. Chains of franchised pro–am studios, like the Arthur Murray and Fred Astaire studios, are found nationwide in the United States. Pro–am dance sport has also started to break ground in Europe, with studios such as Agens Pro–am (Germany), and ProAm-Tanzen (Austria).

== See also ==
- Professional sports
- Semi-professional sports
- Amateur sports
- High performance sport
