= 2012 UK Championship =

Snooker tournament

2012 williamhill.com UK Championship

Tournament information
- Dates: 1–9 December 2012
- Venue: Barbican Centre
- City: York
- Country: England
- Organisation: World Snooker
- Format: Ranking event
- Total prize fund: £637,500
- Winner's share: £125,000
- Highest break: John Higgins (SCO) (147); Jack Lisowski (ENG) (147); Andy Hicks (ENG) (147)

Final
- Champion: Mark Selby (ENG)
- Runner-up: Shaun Murphy (ENG)
- Score: 10–6

The 2012 UK Championship (officially the 2012 williamhill.com UK Championship) was a professional ranking snooker tournament that took place between 1–9 December 2012 at the Barbican Centre in York, England. It was the fifth ranking event of the 2012/2013 season.

For the first time in the history of snooker three maximum breaks were made in a ranking tournament, albeit at different venues. Andy Hicks made the 93rd official maximum break during his round 2 qualifying match against Daniel Wells. This was Hicks' first 147 break. Just one day later Jack Lisowski compiled the 94th official maximum break during his round 3 qualifying match against Chen Zhe. This was Lisowski's first 147 break. John Higgins made the 95th official maximum break during his last 16 match against Mark Davis. This was Higgins' seventh 147 break. It also took the total number of maximum breaks for the season to seven.

Judd Trump was the defending champion, but he lost 5–6 against Mark Joyce in the last 32.

Mark Selby won his third ranking title by defeating Shaun Murphy 10–6 in the final. This was the tournament's first all-English final since 1992, when Jimmy White defeated John Parrott 16–9. By reaching the final Selby also regained number one position in the rankings from Trump.

== Prize fund ==
The breakdown of prize money for this year is shown below:

- Winner: £125,000
- Runner-up: £50,000
- Semi-final: £25,000
- Quarter-final: £17,000
- Last 16: £11,000
- Last 32: £7,500
- Last 48: £5,500
- Last 64: £2,000
- Non-televised highest break: £500
- Televised highest break: £3,500
- Non-televised maximum break: £2,500
- Televised maximum break: £10,000
- Total: £637,500

== Main draw ==
Last 32 best of 11 frames
1	Judd Trump (ENG)	5
Mark Joyce (ENG)	6
14	Ali Carter (ENG)	6
Steve Davis (ENG)	2
9	Stuart Bingham (ENG)	6
Jack Lisowski (ENG)	2
7	Stephen Maguire (SCO)	6
Fergal O'Brien (IRL)	2
6	Mark Williams (WAL)	3
Mark King (ENG)	6
11	Ricky Walden (ENG)	5
Luca Brecel (BEL)	6
12	Graeme Dott (SCO)	6
Martin Gould (ENG)	5
4	Shaun Murphy (ENG)	6
Robert Milkins (ENG)	3
3	John Higgins (SCO)	6
Michael Holt (ENG)	3
16	Mark Davis (ENG)	6
Cao Yupeng (CHN)	1
13	Matthew Stevens (WAL)	6
Dominic Dale (WAL)	1
8	Mark Allen (NIR)	3
Marco Fu (HKG)	6
5	Neil Robertson (AUS)	6
Tom Ford (ENG)	1
15	Barry Hawkins (ENG)	6
Liang Wenbo (CHN)	4
10	Ding Junhui (CHN)	4
Ryan Day (WAL)	6
2	Mark Selby (ENG)	6
Michael White (WAL)	3

Last 16 best of 11 frames
(England) Mark Joyce	2
14	(England) Ali Carter	6
9	(England) Stuart Bingham	6
7	(Scotland) Stephen Maguire	4
(England) Mark King	4
(Belgium) Luca Brecel	6
12	(Scotland) Graeme Dott	2
4	(England) Shaun Murphy	6
3	(Scotland) John Higgins	5
16	(England) Mark Davis	6
13	(Wales) Matthew Stevens	6
(Hong Kong) Marco Fu	4
5	(Australia) Neil Robertson	6
15	(England) Barry Hawkins	2
(Wales) Ryan Day	4
2	(England) Mark Selby	6

Quarter-finals best of 11 frames
14	(England) Ali Carter	6
9	(England) Stuart Bingham	4
(Belgium) Luca Brecel	5
4	(England) Shaun Murphy	6
16	(England) Mark Davis	6
13	(Wales) Matthew Stevens	4
5	(Australia) Neil Robertson	4
2	(England) Mark Selby	6

Semi-finals best of 17 frames
14	(England) Ali Carter	8
4	(England) Shaun Murphy	9
16	(England) Mark Davis	4
2	(England) Mark Selby	9

Final best of 19 frames
4	(England) Shaun Murphy	6
2	(England) Mark Selby	10

== Final ==
Final: Best of 19 frames. Referee: Leo Scullion. Barbican Centre, York, England, 9 December 2012.
Shaun Murphy (4); England	6–10	Mark Selby (2); England
Afternoon: 64–11, 49–58 (54), 0–82 (66), 83–0 (83), 98–35 (98), 67–39, 0–81 (70); Evening: 1–77, 72–67 (Murphy 65, Selby 58), 38–70, 53–63, 78–8, 34–79 (51), 0–107 (98), 31–64, 37–69
98	Highest break	98
0	Century breaks	0
3	50+ breaks	6

== Qualifying ==
These matches were held between 20 and 23 November 2012 at the World Snooker Academy in Sheffield, England.

Round 1 Best of 11 frames
David Grace (ENG)	4
Daniel Wells (WAL)	6
Pankaj Advani (IND)	6
Sam Baird (ENG)	2
Chen Zhe (CHN)	6
Sean O'Sullivan (ENG)	1
Tian Pengfei (CHN)	6
Joel Walker (ENG)	4
Li Yan (CHN)	4
Fraser Patrick (SCO)	6
Luca Brecel (BEL)	6
Scott Donaldson (SCO)	5
Robbie Williams (ENG)	2
Jamie O'Neill (ENG)	6
Michael Wasley (ENG)	w/o
Hossein Vafaei (IRI)	w/d
Thepchaiya Un-Nooh (THA)	6
Passakorn Suwannawat (THA)	5
Liam Highfield (ENG)	6
Ben Judge (AUS)	1
Ian Burns (ENG)	6
Michael Leslie (SCO)	1
Dechawat Poomjaeng (THA)	6
Simon Bedford (ENG)	3
Paul Davison (ENG)	6
Gareth Allen (WAL)	2
Zhang Anda (CHN)	w/o
Duane Jones (WAL)	w/d
Thanawat Thirapongpaiboon (THA)	6
Martin O'Donnell (ENG)	5
Tony Drago (MLT)	3
Craig Steadman (ENG)	6

Round 2 Best of 11 frames
Andy Hicks (ENG)	6
(Wales) Daniel Wells	2
Jimmy White (ENG)	5
(India) Pankaj Advani	6
Aditya Mehta (IND)	4
(China) Chen Zhe	6
Alan McManus (SCO)	2
(China) Tian Pengfei	6
Adam Duffy (ENG)	6
(Scotland) Fraser Patrick	2
Peter Lines (ENG)	4
(Belgium) Luca Brecel	6
James Wattana (THA)	6
(England) Jamie O'Neill	4
Jimmy Robertson (ENG)	6
(England) Michael Wasley	5
Barry Pinches (ENG)	1
(Thailand) Thepchaiya Un-Nooh	6
Cao Yupeng (CHN)	6
(England) Liam Highfield	3
Kurt Maflin (NOR)	3
(England) Ian Burns	6
Rod Lawler (ENG)	6
(Thailand) Dechawat Poomjaeng	5
Yu Delu (CHN)	6
(England) Paul Davison	4
Anthony McGill (SCO)	6
(China) Zhang Anda	2
Alfie Burden (ENG)	5
(Thailand) Thanawat Thirapongpaiboon	6
Mike Dunn (ENG)	4
(England) Craig Steadman	6

Round 3 Best of 11 frames
Mark Joyce (ENG)	6
(England) Andy Hicks	4
Steve Davis (ENG)	6
(India) Pankaj Advani	5
Jack Lisowski (ENG)	6
(China) Chen Zhe	2
David Gilbert (ENG)	6
(China) Tian Pengfei	3
Xiao Guodong (CHN)	6
(England) Adam Duffy	4
Liu Chuang (CHN)	3
(Belgium) Luca Brecel	6
Ben Woollaston (ENG)	6
(Thailand) James Wattana	5
Rory McLeod (ENG)	6
(England) Jimmy Robertson	3
Jamie Jones (WAL)	3
(Thailand) Thepchaiya Un-Nooh	6
Dave Harold (ENG)	4
(China) Cao Yupeng	6
Anthony Hamilton (ENG)	2
(England) Ian Burns	6
Gerard Greene (NIR)	4
(England) Rod Lawler	6
Nigel Bond (ENG)	5
(China) Yu Delu	6
Liang Wenbo (CHN)	6
(Scotland) Anthony McGill	5
Matthew Selt (ENG)	6
(Thailand) Thanawat Thirapongpaiboon	4
Michael White (WAL)	6
(England) Craig Steadman	3

Round 4 Best of 11 frames
Jamie Cope (ENG)	4
(England) Mark Joyce	6
Jamie Burnett (SCO)	2
(England) Steve Davis	6
Joe Perry (ENG)	4
(England) Jack Lisowski	6
Fergal O'Brien (IRL)	6
(England) David Gilbert	2
Mark King (ENG)	6
(China) Xiao Guodong	0
Peter Ebdon (ENG)	1
(Belgium) Luca Brecel	6
Martin Gould (ENG)	6
(England) Ben Woollaston	3
Robert Milkins (ENG)	6
(England) Rory McLeod	5
Michael Holt (ENG)	6
(Thailand) Thepchaiya Un-Nooh	1
Marcus Campbell (SCO)	4
(China) Cao Yupeng	6
Dominic Dale (WAL)	6
(England) Ian Burns	2
Marco Fu (HKG)	6
(England) Rod Lawler	2
Tom Ford (ENG)	6
(China) Yu Delu	1
Andrew Higginson (ENG)	0
(China) Liang Wenbo	6
Ryan Day (WAL)	6
(England) Matthew Selt	3
Ken Doherty (IRL)	3
(Wales) Michael White	6

== Century breaks ==
=== Televised stage centuries ===
- 147, 116 – John Higgins
- 134, 101 – Ali Carter
- 131, 121 – Marco Fu
- 131, 104, 102 – Stephen Maguire
- 130, 122, 105 – Shaun Murphy
- 129, 127, 112, 105, 100 – Neil Robertson
- 121, 106, 105, 103, 101 – Mark Selby
- 120 – Stuart Bingham
- 106, 103, 101 – Mark Davis
- 106 – Ding Junhui
- 105 – Mark Williams
- 104 – Judd Trump
- 103 – Mark King
- 102 – Liang Wenbo
- 101 – Barry Hawkins
- 100 – Ryan Day

=== Qualifying stage centuries ===
- 147, 131, 104, 100 – Jack Lisowski
- 147 – Andy Hicks
- 141, 136 – Steve Davis
- 140, 103 – Ben Woollaston
- 138 – Mark Joyce
- 136, 119, 110, 110, 103 – Luca Brecel
- 135, 102 – Rod Lawler
- 133 – Tom Ford
- 132, 123, 105 – Marco Fu
- 130 – Dave Harold
- 129 – Yu Delu
- 128 – Liam Highfield
- 127, 124, 118 – David Gilbert
- 120, 104 – Thepchaiya Un-Nooh
- 120 – Ryan Day
- 115, 111 – Sam Baird
- 113, 105 – Liang Wenbo
- 113 – Kurt Maflin
- 111 – Marcus Campbell
- 104 – Mark King
- 103, 102 – Pankaj Advani
- 102, 101 – Daniel Wells
- 102 – Xiao Guodong
- 101 – Jamie O'Neill
- 101 – Joe Perry
