= Cue sports at the 2006 Asian Games – Men's snooker team =

Men's snooker team at the 2006 Asian Games
- Venue: Al-Sadd Multi-Purpose Hall
- Dates: 5–6 December 2006
- Competitors: 59 from 21 nations

Medalists
gold medal	China; Liang Wenbo, Tian Pengfei, Ding Junhui
silver medal	Hong Kong; Fung Kwok Wai, Marco Fu, Chan Wai Ki
bronze medal	India; Aditya Mehta, Yasin Merchant, Rupesh Shah

The men's snooker team tournament at the 2006 Asian Games in Doha took place from 5 December to 6 December at Al-Sadd Multi-Purpose Hall.

== Schedule ==
All times are Arabia Standard Time (UTC+03:00)

Date	Time	Event
Tuesday, 5 December 2006	10:00	Round of 32
Tuesday, 5 December 2006	13:00	Round of 16
Tuesday, 5 December 2006	16:00	Quarterfinals
Wednesday, 6 December 2006	10:00	Semifinals
Wednesday, 6 December 2006	19:00	Finals

== Results ==
Legend

- WO — Won by walkover

=== Bracket ===
==== Finals ====
Gold medal match
1	Hong Kong	0
2	China	3

Bronze medal match
4	Malaysia	0
	India	3

==== Top half ====
Round of 32
Vietnam	3
Chinese Taipei	1
Saudi Arabia	1
Qatar	3

Round of 16
1	Hong Kong	3
United Arab Emirates	0
Bahrain	1
Kuwait	3
Vietnam	0
Qatar	3
Mongolia	0
4	Malaysia	3

Quarterfinals
1	Hong Kong	3
Kuwait	0
Qatar	1
4	Malaysia	3

Semifinals
1	Hong Kong	3
4	Malaysia	1

==== Bottom half ====
Round of 32
India	WO
Singapore
Iraq	3
Philippines	1
South Korea	3
Bangladesh	0

Round of 16
3	Pakistan	3
Sri Lanka	0
India	3
Iraq	2
South Korea	0
Thailand	3
Macau	0
2	China	3

Quarterfinals
3	Pakistan	0
India	3
Thailand	2
2	China	3

Semifinals
India	0
2	China	3

=== Round of 32 ===
Vietnam	3–1	Chinese Taipei

Đỗ Hoàng Quân	0–1	Ku Chih-wei
Lương Chí Dũng	1–0	Lee Po-hsien
Đỗ Hoàng Quân / Lương Chí Dũng	1–0	Ku Chih-wei / Lee Po-hsien
Đỗ Hoàng Quân	1–0	Lee Po-hsien

Saudi Arabia	1–3	Qatar

Ahmed Aseeri	0–1	Mohsen Bukshaisha
Nezar Aseeri	1–0	Ahmed Saif
Ahmed Aseeri / Nezar Aseeri	0–1	Mohsen Bukshaisha / Ahmed Saif
Ahmed Aseeri	0–1	Ahmed Saif

India	3–0	Singapore

Aditya Mehta	1–0	Keith E
Yasin Merchant	1–0	Peter Gilchrist
Aditya Mehta / Rupesh Shah	1–0	Keith E / Peter Gilchrist

Iraq	3–1	Philippines

Reenat Walem	0–1	Leonardo Andam
Firas Kamel	1–0	Felipe Tauro
Reenat Walem / Firas Kamel	1–0	Leonardo Andam / Alvin Punzalan
Firas Kamel	1–0	Leonardo Andam

South Korea	3–0	Bangladesh

Jung Tae-hoon	1–0	Salman Haroon
Lee Wan-soo	1–0	Tayef Quader
Jung Tae-hoon / Park Seung-chil	1–0	Salman Haroon / Tayef Quader

=== Round of 16 ===
Hong Kong	3–0	United Arab Emirates

Fung Kwok Wai	1–0	Mohammed Shehab
Marco Fu	1–0	Mohammed Al-Jokar
Marco Fu / Chan Wai Ki	1–0	Mohammed Shehab / Eissa Al-Sayed

Bahrain	1–3	Kuwait

Mohamed Isa Al-Shaikh	0–1	Yaqoub Al-Anezi
Hisham Rashid Saqr	0–1	Naser Ali
Husain Mahmood / Mohamed Isa Al-Shaikh	1–0	Naser Ali / Nawaf Al-Hamli
Mohamed Isa Al-Shaikh	0–1	Naser Ali

Vietnam	0–3	Qatar

Đỗ Hoàng Quân	0–1	Mohsen Bukshaisha
Lương Chí Dũng	0–1	Ahmed Saif
Đỗ Hoàng Quân / Lương Chí Dũng	0–1	Mohsen Bukshaisha / Ahmed Saif

Mongolia	0–3	Malaysia

Batsuuriin Buyan	0–1	Thor Chuan Leong
Altanzulyn Mönkhgerel	0–1	Moh Keen Hoo
Tseveendashiin Temüüjin / Batsuuriin Buyan	0–1	Moh Keen Hoo / Lai Chee Wei

Pakistan	3–0	Sri Lanka

Shokat Ali	1–0	Prasanna Pushpakumara
Khurram Hussain Agha	1–0	Wela Henrige Jayawardena
Shokat Ali / Muhammad Yousaf	1–0	Prasanna Pushpakumara / Wela Henrige Jayawardena

India	3–2	Iraq

Aditya Mehta	0–1	Firas Kamel
Yasin Merchant	0–1	Reenat Walem
Rupesh Shah / Yasin Merchant	1–0	Firas Kamel / Reenat Walem
Aditya Mehta	1–0	Reenat Walem
Yasin Merchant	1–0	Firas Kamel

South Korea	0–3	Thailand

Jung Tae-hoon	0–1	Phaitoon Phonbun
Lee Wan-soo	0–1	Supoj Saenla
Jung Tae-hoon / Park Seung-chil	0–1	Supoj Saenla / Kobkit Palajin

Macau	0–3	China

Wong Tin Hong	0–1	Ding Junhui
Vong Wai Si	0–1	Liang Wenbo
Si Tou Chong Wut / Vong Wai Si	0–1	Ding Junhui / Tian Pengfei

=== Quarterfinals ===
Hong Kong	3–0	Kuwait

Marco Fu	1–0	Yaqoub Al-Anezi
Fung Kwok Wai	1–0	Naser Ali
Marco Fu / Chan Wai Ki	1–0	Naser Ali / Yaqoub Al-Anezi

Qatar	1–3	Malaysia

Mohsen Bukshaisha	0–1	Thor Chuan Leong
Ahmed Saif	1–0	Moh Keen Hoo
Mohsen Bukshaisha / Ahmed Saif	0–1	Moh Keen Hoo / Thor Chuan Leong
Mohsen Bukshaisha	0–1	Moh Keen Hoo

Pakistan	0–3	India

Shokat Ali	0–1	Yasin Merchant
Khurram Hussain Agha	0–1	Rupesh Shah
Shokat Ali / Khurram Hussain Agha	0–1	Yasin Merchant / Aditya Mehta

Thailand	2–3	China

Phaitoon Phonbun	1–0	Liang Wenbo
Supoj Saenla	1–0	Ding Junhui
Phaitoon Phonbun / Supoj Saenla	0–1	Ding Junhui / Tian Pengfei
Supoj Saenla	0–1	Liang Wenbo
Phaitoon Phonbun	0–1	Ding Junhui

=== Semifinals ===
Hong Kong	3–1	Malaysia

Marco Fu	1–0	Thor Chuan Leong
Fung Kwok Wai	0–1	Moh Keen Hoo
Marco Fu / Chan Wai Ki	1–0	Moh Keen Hoo / Thor Chuan Leong
Marco Fu	1–0	Moh Keen Hoo

India	0–3	China

Rupesh Shah	0–1	Ding Junhui
Yasin Merchant	0–1	Liang Wenbo
Aditya Mehta / Yasin Merchant	0–1	Ding Junhui / Tian Pengfei

=== Bronze medal match ===
Malaysia	0–3	India

Thor Chuan Leong	0–1	Aditya Mehta
Moh Keen Hoo	0–1	Yasin Merchant
Moh Keen Hoo / Thor Chuan Leong	0–1	Aditya Mehta / Yasin Merchant

=== Gold medal match ===
Hong Kong	0–3	China

Fung Kwok Wai	0–1	Liang Wenbo
Marco Fu	0–1	Ding Junhui
Marco Fu / Chan Wai Ki	0–1	Ding Junhui / Tian Pengfei

== Non-participating athletes ==
- Zia Azad (BAN)
- Ayhab Hasan (IRQ)
- Bashar Hussein (QAT)
- Lee Tung-hsin (TPE)
