= 2013 General Cup =

General Cup

Tournament information
- Dates: 9–13 September 2013
- Venue: General Snooker Club
- Country: Hong Kong
- Format: Non-ranking event
- Winner's share: $120,000

Final
- Champion: (England) Mark Davis
- Runner-up: (Australia) Neil Robertson
- Score: 7–2

The 2013 General Cup was a professional non-ranking snooker tournament that took place between 9–13 September 2013 at the General Snooker Club in Hong Kong.

Mark Davis won his fourth professional title by defeating defending champion Neil Robertson 7–2 in the final.

== Prize fund ==
The breakdown of prize money for this year is shown below:

- Winner: $120,000
- Runner-up: $60,000
- Semi-final: $40,000
- Per century break: $2,000
- Highest break: $20,000
- Maximum break: $367,000 (Note: The maximum break prize money contained $147,000 and a diamond encrusted cue worth approximately $220,000.)

== Round robin stage ==
=== Group A ===
POS	Player	MP	MW	FW	FL	FD	PTS
1	(England) Barry Hawkins	3	2	8	5	+3	2
2	(Australia) Neil Robertson	3	2	7	4	+3	2
3	(England) Joe Perry	3	2	6	6	0	2
4	(England) Andrew Higginson	3	0	3	9	−6	0

- Barry Hawkins 2–3 Joe Perry
- Neil Robertson 3–1 Andrew Higginson
- Joe Perry 3–1 Andrew Higginson
- Neil Robertson 1–3 Barry Hawkins
- Barry Hawkins 3–1 Andrew Higginson
- Neil Robertson 3–0 Joe Perry

=== Group B ===
POS	Player	MP	MW	FW	FL	FD	PTS
1	(Hong Kong) Marco Fu	3	3	9	5	+4	3
2	(England) Mark Davis	3	2	8	6	+2	2
3	(England) Ricky Walden	3	1	5	8	−3	1
4	(England) Shaun Murphy	3	0	6	9	−3	0

- Shaun Murphy 2–3 Ricky Walden
- Ricky Walden 1–3 Mark Davis
- Shaun Murphy 2–3 Mark Davis
- Ricky Walden 1–3 Marco Fu
- Shaun Murphy 2–3 Marco Fu
- Marco Fu 3–2 Mark Davis

== Knock-out stage ==
Semi-finals; Best of 11 frames
(England) Barry Hawkins	1
(England) Mark Davis	6
(Hong Kong) Marco Fu	3
(Australia) Neil Robertson	6

Final; Best of 13 frames
(England) Mark Davis	7
(Australia) Neil Robertson	2
