= 2016 Players Tour Championship Final =

2016 Ladbrokes Players Tour Championship Grand Final
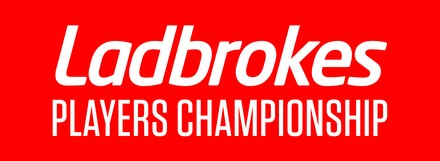

Tournament information
- Dates: 22–27 March 2016
- Venue: EventCity
- City: Manchester
- Country: England
- Organisation: World Snooker
- Format: Ranking event
- Total prize fund: £350,000
- Winner's share: £100,000
- Highest break: Ding Junhui (CHN) (143)

Final
- Champion: Mark Allen (NIR)
- Runner-up: Ricky Walden (ENG)
- Score: 10–6

The 2016 Players Tour Championship Grand Final (officially the 2016 Ladbrokes Players Tour Championship Grand Final) was a professional ranking snooker tournament that took place between 22 and 27 March 2016 at the EventCity in Manchester, England. It was the eighth ranking event of the 2015/2016 season. The tournament was broadcast in the UK on ITV4.

Defending champion Joe Perry failed to qualify for this year finals having finished 51st on the Order of Merit. The tournament was won by Mark Allen who beat Ricky Walden 10–6 in the 19-frame final, winning the £100,000 first prize. It was Allen's third ranking event win and his first in Europe after two wins in China in 2012 and 2013.

== Prize fund ==
The breakdown of prize money is shown below:

	Prize fund
Winner	£100,000
Runner-up	£38,000
Semi-finalist	£20,000
Quarter-finalist	£12,500
Last 16	£7,000
Last 32	£4,000
Highest break	£2,000
Total	£350,000

The "rolling 147 prize" for a maximum break stood at £10,000. The sponsor pledged to double the prize for a 147 break and so the prize would have been £20,000.

== Seeding list ==
The players competed in 7 minor-ranking tournaments to earn points for the European Tour and Asian Tour Orders of Merit. The top 24 from the European Tour and the top 2 from the Asian Tour qualified for the finals, plus 6 more from a combination of both lists. Mark Selby withdrew for personal reasons and was replaced in the draw by Matthew Selt.

The seeding list of the finals was based on the combined list from the earnings of both Orders of Merit.

Rank	Player	European Tour	Asian Tour	Total points
~~1~~	~~Mark Selby (ENG)~~	26,625	0	26,625
2	Barry Hawkins (ENG)	25,275	0	25,275
3	Marco Fu (HKG)	23,175	1,300	24,475
4	Mark Allen (NIR)	22,200	0	22,200
5	Rory McLeod (ENG)	22,200	0	22,200
6	Ali Carter (ENG)	20,550	0	20,550
7	Shaun Murphy (ENG)	15,975	0	15,975
8	Ding Junhui (CHN)	1,425	13,500	14,925
9	Mark King (ENG)	13,200	1,300	14,500
10	Ryan Day (WAL)	14,475	0	14,475
11	Tom Ford (ENG)	13,050	800	13,850
12	Michael White (WAL)	13,200	0	13,200
13	Tian Pengfei (CHN)	11,700	1,300	13,000
14	Mark Williams (WAL)	12,225	0	12,225
15	Ben Woollaston (ENG)	9,750	1,750	11,500
16	Martin Gould (ENG)	10,425	0	10,425
17	Andrew Higginson (ENG)	10,275	0	10,275
18	Ricky Walden (ENG)	3,525	6,500	10,025
19	Mike Dunn (ENG)	9,975	0	9,975
20	Kyren Wilson (ENG)	9,900	0	9,900
21	Liang Wenbo (CHN)	8,550	1,300	9,850
22	Dominic Dale (WAL)	8,025	1,300	9,325
23	Michael Holt (ENG)	8,700	0	8,700
24	Judd Trump (ENG)	8,250	0	8,250
25	Jimmy Robertson (ENG)	4,500	3,500	8,000
26	Alan McManus (SCO)	7,950	0	7,950
27	David Gilbert (ENG)	7,350	0	7,350
28	Sam Baird (ENG)	7,275	0	7,275
29	Luca Brecel (BEL)	6,675	0	6,675
30	Graeme Dott (SCO)	6,450	0	6,450
31	Robert Milkins (ENG)	2,700	3,500	6,200
32	Mark Davis (ENG)	6,150	0	6,150
33	Matthew Selt (ENG)	6,000	0	6,000

== Main draw ==
Last 32; Best of 7 frames
33	Matthew Selt (ENG)	4
17	Andrew Higginson (ENG)	1
15	Ben Woollaston (ENG)	4
25	Jimmy Robertson (ENG)	3
14	Mark Williams (WAL)	3
22	Dominic Dale (WAL)	4
7	Shaun Murphy (ENG)	4
21	Liang Wenbo (CHN)	1
4	Mark Allen (NIR)	4
32	Mark Davis (ENG)	3
9	Mark King (ENG)	4
28	Sam Baird (ENG)	2
10	Ryan Day (WAL)	4
20	Kyren Wilson (ENG)	1
5	Rory McLeod (ENG)	1
19	Mike Dunn (ENG)	4
3	Marco Fu (HKG)	4
26	Alan McManus (SCO)	3
11	Tom Ford (ENG)	1
18	Ricky Walden (ENG)	4
16	Martin Gould (ENG)	1
24	Judd Trump (ENG)	4
6	Ali Carter (ENG)	4
30	Graeme Dott (SCO)	1
8	Ding Junhui (CHN)	4
27	David Gilbert (ENG)	1
12	Michael White (WAL)	4
29	Luca Brecel (BEL)	2
13	Tian Pengfei (CHN)	1
31	Robert Milkins (ENG)	4
2	Barry Hawkins (ENG)	4
23	Michael Holt (ENG)	2

Last 16; Best of 7 frames
33	(England) Matthew Selt	2
15	(England) Ben Woollaston	4
22	(Wales) Dominic Dale	1
7	(England) Shaun Murphy	4
4	(Northern Ireland) Mark Allen	4
9	(England) Mark King	2
10	(Wales) Ryan Day	2
19	(England) Mike Dunn	4
3	(Hong Kong) Marco Fu	2
18	(England) Ricky Walden	4
24	(England) Judd Trump	1
6	(England) Ali Carter	4
8	(China) Ding Junhui	4
12	(Wales) Michael White	0
31	(England) Robert Milkins	3
2	(England) Barry Hawkins	4

Quarter-finals; Best of 7 frames
15	(England) Ben Woollaston	3
7	(England) Shaun Murphy	4
4	(Northern Ireland) Mark Allen	4
19	(England) Mike Dunn	1
18	(England) Ricky Walden	4
6	(England) Ali Carter	1
8	(China) Ding Junhui	2
2	(England) Barry Hawkins	4

Semi-finals; Best of 11 frames
7	(England) Shaun Murphy	4
4	(Northern Ireland) Mark Allen	6
18	(England) Ricky Walden	6
2	(England) Barry Hawkins	3

Final; Best of 19 frames
4	(Northern Ireland) Mark Allen	10
18	(England) Ricky Walden	6

== Final ==
Final: Best of 19 frames. Referee: Colin Humphries. EventCity, Manchester, England, 27 March 2016.
Mark Allen (4); Northern Ireland	10–6	Ricky Walden (18); England
Afternoon: 74–0 (59), 0–89 (85), 8–86, 0–107 (85), 73–6 (51), 96–44 (80), 71–44, 73–33 (68), 78–35 (64); Evening: 83–11 (52), 1–68 (62), 0–92 (92), 51–59, 72–38, 87–28 (61), 100–0 (67)
80	Highest break	92
0	Century breaks	0
8	50+ breaks	4

== Century breaks ==
- 143, 127, 104 – Ding Junhui
- 135 – Martin Gould
- 134, 123, 119 – Mark Allen
- 119 – Barry Hawkins
- 114, 112, 111, 104, 103 – Ricky Walden
- 112 – Ali Carter
- 107 – Ryan Day
- 106 – Ben Woollaston
- 103 – Shaun Murphy
