= Ricky Walden =

English snooker player (born 1982)

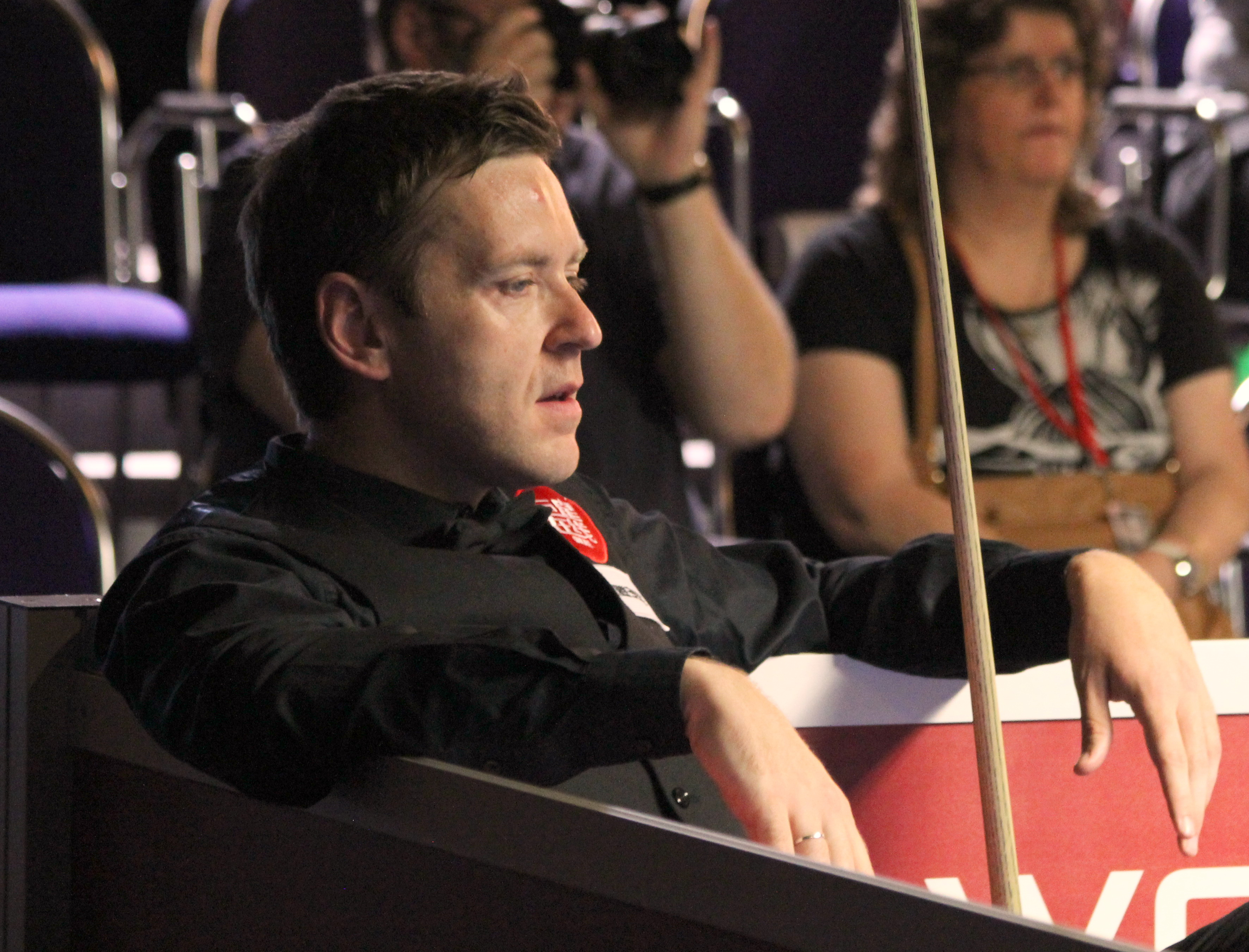
- Walden at the 2016 Paul Hunter Classic

Personal information
- Nickname: Stamina Man
- Born: 11 November 1982 (age 44) Chester, England

Sport
- Country: England
- Sport: Snooker
- Professional: 2001–present
- Highest ranking: 6 (March 2015)
- Current ranking: 50 (as of 7 November 2026)
- Maximum breaks: 1
- Century breaks: 405 (as of 19 November 2026)

Tournament wins
- Ranking: 3
- Minor-ranking: 1

Ricky Walden (born 11 November 1982) is an English professional snooker player from Chester.

Walden turned professional in 2000 and it took him eight years to win his first ranking title at the Shanghai Masters. He has since won the 2012 Wuxi Classic and the 2014 International Championship and has been inside the top 16 in the season-ending rankings on four occasions. A former world Top 6 player, Walden has reached the televised stages of the World Snooker Championship on nine occasions as of 2023, with his best result being a semi-finalist in 2013.

== Early years ==
Walden was born in Chester but raised in Bagillt, North Wales, where he now lives once more, having spent some time living elsewhere in Flintshire. He was one of the Young Players of Distinction in a scheme run in 2000, designed to help young players develop their playing and media skills, alongside Shaun Murphy, Stephen Maguire and Ali Carter. In 2001 he won the World Under-21 Championship.

== Career ==
=== 1999–2011 ===
Walden began his professional career by playing UK Tour in 1999 (renamed the Challenge Tour in 2000), at the time the second-level professional tour. Then he played Challenge Tour in 2001 and entered Main Tour. He started the 2004/2005 season ranked at number 78 in the world, but climbed 30 places that year. He beat John Higgins twice that season, at the Grand Prix and UK Championship, and reached the quarter-final of the China Open.

In 2005–06 his best run was to the last 16 in the China Open, which he achieved by beating Stephen Maguire. In 2006–07 he had 2 last-32 appearance including the UK Championship, where he lost to Ronnie O'Sullivan 8–9. He lost to eventual finalist Mark Selby in qualifying for the World Championship.

He reached #36 for the 2007–08 season and the same year he reached the last 16 of the Grand Prix, beating John Parrott in qualifying and four top-32 players in the main round-robin stage. He crashed out in the China Open to Mark Selby and in the qualifying for the World Championship, to Mark Allen.

In the 2008 Shanghai Masters he defeated Lee Spick and Ian McCulloch to qualify. At the venue he defeated wildcard Zhang Anda, Stephen Hendry, Neil Robertson (5–4, from 1–4 down), Steve Davis in the quarter-finals (5–2, from 0–2 down), and Mark Selby in the semi-final (6–4, from 1–4 down). He won his first ranking title by beating Ronnie O'Sullivan 10–8 in the final. The rest of the season was solid rather than spectacular, but a qualifying victory over Anthony Hamilton earned him a first appearance at the Crucible Theatre, where he lost 6–10 to Mark Selby.

In 2008 he also won the Six-red Snooker International, beating Stuart Bingham 8–3 in the final.

Walden made it to the World Championship for the second time in 2011 as a seeded player, but was beaten by qualifier Rory McLeod 10–6. After the match, Walden criticised McLeod for what he considered to be a slow and 'boring' style of play, although Walden was only marginally quicker than McLeod. McLeod responded to the criticism by arguing that Walden was more responsible for the pace of the match.

=== 2011/2012 season ===
Walden started the 2011–12 season by losing in qualifying for the first two ranking events of the year. However, he qualified for the UK Championship by defeating Jamie Jones 6–2. In the main draw he beat Stephen Lee, Mark Williams and Shaun Murphy all by 6–3 scorelines to set up a semi-final meeting with Mark Allen. After the first session of the best-of 17-frames match Walden held a 5–3 advantage. However, upon resumption in the evening he lost the opening four frames and would eventually lose the match 7–9. This was Walden's first semi-final in a ranking event based in Britain.

Walden played in all 12 of the minor-ranking Players Tour Championship series of events throughout the season, reaching the final in Event 6, where he lost to Neil Robertson 1–4. This result was a large factor in him finishing 15th on the PTC Order of Merit, inside the top 24 who reached the Finals. He also produced a maximum break during Event 10, the second 147 of the event. At the Finals he whitewashed Matthew Stevens 4–0, before receiving a bye to the quarter-finals due to Ronnie O'Sullivan withdrawing from the event. He played Stephen Maguire and was beaten 3–4.

Walden's performance in the UK Championship proved to be his best run in the ranking events of the season, as he could not get past the second round in any of the remaining tournaments. His season finished in disappointment as he failed to qualify for the World Championship, losing to Jamie Jones 2–10. However, Walden's form throughout the season was enough for him to end it ranked world number 15, meaning he had finished the season inside the elite top 16 for the first time.

=== 2012/2013 season ===
Walden began the season by winning his second ranking event title at the Wuxi Classic. He beat amateur Zhu Yinghui in the first round 5–0 and was leading Joe Perry 4–0 and by 64–0 in the fifth frame, before Perry incredibly went on to level the match. The deciding frame came down to the final black, with Perry missing and Walden potting it at 1am local time, to reach the quarter-finals. He defeated Robert Milkins 5–3 and comfortably beat Marcus Campbell 6–1 in the semi-finals to play in his second career ranking final, where he faced Stuart Bingham. Walden raced into a 7–1 lead in the first session, despite Bingham's solitary frame being a 147, and would return to close out a 10–4 victory. Following this he lost in the first round of the Australian Goldfields Open 4–5 to Jamie Cope and in the second round of the Shanghai Masters 2–5 to Mark Williams.

At the inaugural International Championship Walden saw off Lu Ning in the first round and then kept his concentration at 4–0 up against world number one Mark Selby in the next round to triumph 6–3. He was then whitewashed 0–6 by Peter Ebdon in the quarter-finals. At the UK Championship, Walden played 17-year-old world number 74 Luca Brecel in the first round and despite leading 2–0, 4–2, and 5–4 in the best-of-11 frame match, Walden was eventually beaten 5–6. Now a part of the elite top 16, Walden played in the Masters for the second time in his career and looked to have all the momentum in his first round match against Shaun Murphy as he recovered from 1–4 down to draw level at 4–4, but Murphy upped his game to take the last two frames and expel Walden from the tournament.

Successive first round losses at the German Masters and Welsh Open ensued, before Walden rediscovered some form at the World Open by eliminating Ebdon 5–2 and Stephen Maguire 5–4, but then lost to reigning champion Mark Allen 1–5 in the quarter-finals. Walden emphatically recorded his first ever victory at the World Championship by thrashing Michael Holt 10–1 in the opening round. He played Robert Milkins in the last 16 and saw a dominating lead of 9–3 cut to 11–10, before holding his nerve to advance to the quarter-finals with a 13–11 win. Walden played qualifier Michael White in the quarter-finals, defeating him 13–6 to progress to the semi-finals, where he faced Barry Hawkins. Walden led the match 12–8 before Hawkins won eight successive frames and went on to defeat Walden 17–14. He finished the season at a career high world number eight in the rankings.

=== 2013/2014 season ===
Walden began using a new cue at the start of the 2013–14 season and lost in the first round of the opening two ranking events, but won the minor-ranking Bluebell Wood Open, defeating Marco Fu 4–3 in the final. In the UK Championship, Walden defeated Mark Williams 6–5 in the last 32, Ding Junhui 6–4 in the last 16, and Mark Allen 6–2 in the quarter-finals to reach his second UK semi-final in three years. Playing Mark Selby in the semi-final, he was on the receiving end of snooker's 100th professional maximum break in the seventh frame and went on to lose the match 9–5. Five days later, Walden witnessed another 147 against him, this time by Gary Wilson in qualifying for the German Masters, a match that Walden lost 5–3.

In the Masters, Walden came from 5–2 behind to defeat Barry Hawkins 6–5 in the first round. He faced Ronnie O'Sullivan in the quarter-finals, but was whitewashed 6–0 in a match that lasted just 58 minutes. Walden scored 39 points in the first frame, but nothing thereafter as O'Sullivan compiled 556 points without reply, setting a new professional record. He beat Pankaj Advani, Xiao Guodong and Shaun Murphy in reaching the quarter-finals of the China Open, but then lost 5–3 to Ali Carter. At the World Championship, Walden beat Kyren Wilson 10–7 to face Hawkins in the second round, a repeat of the previous year's semi-final. At 9–5 ahead, Walden again squandered a lead against Hawkins as he was defeated 13–11.

=== 2014/2015 season ===
In September 2014, he reached the final of the Six-red World Championship but lost 8–7 against Stephen Maguire. In November, he won through to the final of the International Championship without facing a top 16 player. From 7–7 in the final against Mark Allen, Walden produced three breaks above 50 and a further century to take his third ranking title with a 10–7 victory. The winner's cheque of £125,000 is the highest of his career. He lost in the fourth round of the UK Championship 6–0 to Stuart Bingham and Ronnie O'Sullivan knocked him out of the Masters for the second year in a row, this time 6–4 in the opening round. Walden lost five frames in a row against Luca Brecel in the quarter-finals of the Welsh Open to be defeated 5–3.

Walden reached his second ranking event final of the season by coming back from 3–0 down against Thepchaiya Un-Nooh at the Indian Open to win 4–3. He met Michael White in a one-sided match where White scored 419 points to Walden's 27 as he thrashed him 5–0 in 53 minutes. He could not recover from this loss in the remaining three ranking events as he lost in the last 32 of each, ending his season with a 10–8 defeat to Graeme Dott in the first round of the World Championship.

=== 2015/2016 season ===
After losing 5–4 to Stephen Maguire in the second round of the Australian Goldfields Open, a poor run of form saw Walden fail to advance beyond the last 64 of any of the main ranking events until the PTC Grand Final in March 2016 and during that time described his play as the worst in his career. He qualified for the PTC Finals by reaching the final of the only minor ranking Asian Tour event this season, the Haining Open, where he lost 4–3 to Ding Junhui. At the PTC Finals he beat Tom Ford 4–1, Marco Fu 4–2 and Ali Carter 4–1 to make the semi-finals. Walden saw off Barry Hawkins 6–3 to play in a ranking event final in Britain for the first time in his career and won a trio of frames to only trail Mark Allen 7–6, but then lost three frames to lose 10–6.

In the following week he overcame Stuart Bingham 5–1 to play in the semi-finals of the China Open and made a 131 break in the deciding frame against John Higgins. In his second ranking event final in seven days Walden took an early 3–1 advantage over Judd Trump, but went on to lose 10–4. His poor run of form earlier in the season coincided with Walden becoming a father for the first time in September 2015. He also explained that he had been making technical changes with his game and since ditching them and reverting to how he naturally plays the game his play had dramatically improved.

Walden battled through a scrappy match in the opening round of the World Championship in defeating Robbie Williams 10–8 and then lost 13–8 to Higgins. Despite his recent good form Walden stated that he would have to improve in all departments of his game if he wanted to become a world champion in the future.

=== 2016/2017 season ===
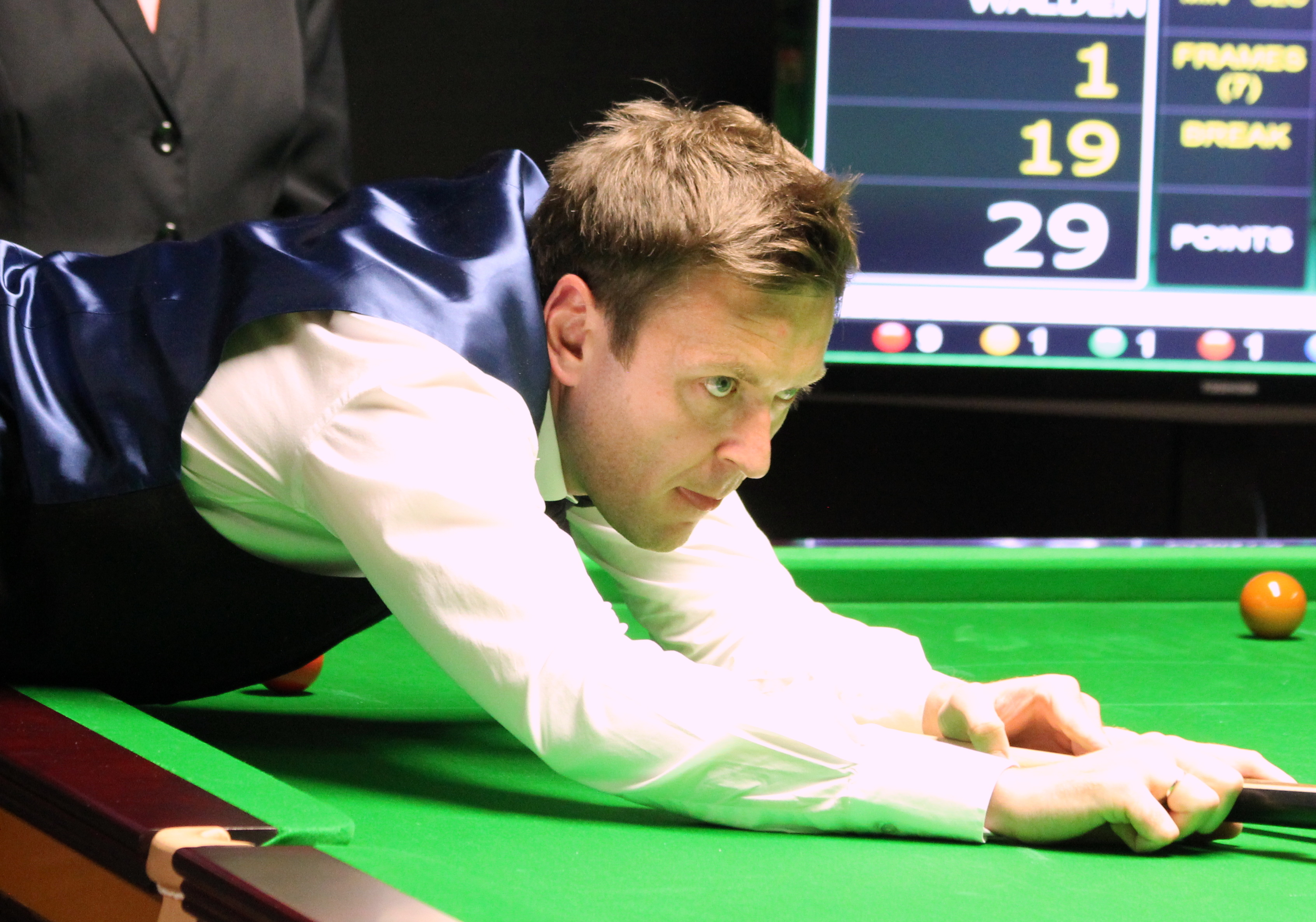
2016 Paul Hunter Classic

Walden suffered a bulging disc in his back in December 2016. He was concerned about maintaining his ranking, and began entering more tournaments than in previous seasons. The injury prevented him from putting in the practise hours to maintain form, and he stopped getting results. He soon dropped out of the top 16, where he'd been a fixture since 2013.

Walden's only quarter-final of the 2016–17 season was at the English Open and he lost it 5–2 to Barry Hawkins. He did almost get to the same stage of the International Championship, but was edged out 6–5 by Ding Junhui in the last 16. Walden also lost 6–5 in the third round of the UK Championship, having led Mark Williams 5–3. After failing to get beyond the last 16 of any event after this, Walden dropped out of the top 16 and needed to win three matches to qualify for the World Championship. He could not win one as Hammad Miah - having recovered from a 0–5 deficit - defeated him 10–7.

=== 2017/2018 season ===
In the UK Championship, Walden reached the last 16 after knocking out Duane Jones, Jamie Jones, and Kyren Wilson before dispatched by the eventual finalist Shaun Murphy. In the next tournament, he reached the quarter-final of the Scottish Open before losing to Cao Yupeng. He qualified for the World Snooker Championship after beating Joe Swail, Lee Walker, and Andrew Higginson in the qualifying rounds. He advanced to the second round of the tournament for the fourth time with a 10–6 victory over Luca Brecel, but eventually lost to Judd Trump by 13–9.

=== 2018/2019 season ===
Early in the season, with wins over the likes of Jimmy White, Li Hang and Mark Allen, Walden reached the quarter-final of the Riga Masters but lost to the eventual champion Neil Robertson 4–2. In December 2018, Walden suffered a shock first round exit in the UK Championship after losing 6–5 to Jak Jones. He failed to qualify for the World Snooker Championship after losing 10–9 to Eden Sharav in the qualifying round, despite leading 9–6.

=== 2019/2020 season ===
Walden's best result of the season came in the English Open, he reached the quarter-final after winning against players like Michael Holt and Thepchaiya Un-Nooh before dispatched by David Gilbert in the decider. At the UK Championship, he was knocked out in the second round by Martin O'Donnell, losing 6–2. In July 2020, he was unable to qualify for the World Snooker Championship for the consecutive year after losing 10–5 to Matthew Stevens in the final qualifying round.

=== 2020/2021 season ===
At the UK Championship, Walden reached the last 16 after knocking out Rod Lawler, Ashely Carty, and Mark Williams before losing to Judd Trump. His best result of the season came in the Scottish Open, in which he advanced to the quarter-final after beating the likes of Tom Ford and Mark Allen before losing to the eventual champion Mark Selby. In April 2021, Walden qualified for the World Snooker Championship for the first time in 3 years after beating Peter Lines and Ryan Day in the qualifying rounds. He drew Anthony McGill in the first round.

=== 2022/2023 season ===
Walden qualified for the Crucible, in the first round coming back from 9-6 down to lose the decider against eventual winner Luca Brecel, his first ever victory in the event after five previous visits.

== Personal life ==
Walden married Natalie Wilton in a short ceremony at New York City Hall on Thursday 22 May 2014. They have been together since 2010. Their son was born in September 2015, causing Walden to withdraw from the Shanghai Masters. They also have a second son.

== Performance and rankings timeline ==
Tournament	1999/ 00	2000/ 01	2001/ 02	2002/ 03	2003/ 04	2004/ 05	2005/ 06	2006/ 07	2007/ 08	2008/ 09	2009/ 10	2010/ 11	2011/ 12	2012/ 13	2013/ 14	2014/ 15	2015/ 16	2016/ 17	2017/ 18	2018/ 19	2019/ 20		2020/ 21	2021/ 22	2022/ 23	2023/ 24	2024/ 25	2025/ 26	2026/ 27
Ranking (Note: It shows the ranking at the beginning of the season)	(Note: He was an amateur)		(Note: New players don't have a ranking)	109	99	78	48	36	36	35	20	20	20	15	8	10	10	8	21	28	30		46	32	18	22	33	40	54
Ranking tournaments
Championship League	Tournament Not Held								Non-Ranking Event														RR	2R	3R	RR	RR	3R	RR
China Open	A	A	LQ	Not Held		QF	2R	LQ	1R	2R	LQ	2R	2R	2R	QF	2R	F	2R	2R	3R	Tournament Not Held								LQ
Wuhan Open	Tournament Not Held																									LQ	LQ	LQ	LQ
British Open	A	A	LQ	1R	2R	LQ	Tournament Not Held																	QF	LQ	LQ	2R	LQ	1R
English Open	Tournament Not Held																	QF	2R	4R	QF		2R	1R	2R	3R	1R	3R	1R
Shenzhen Open (Note: The event was called the Xi'an Grand Prix (2024/2025–2025/2026))	Tournament Not Held																										2R	1R	2R
Northern Ireland Open	Tournament Not Held																	3R	4R	1R	3R		1R	SF	LQ	QF	LQ	LQ	3R
International Championship	Tournament Not Held													QF	LQ	W	LQ	3R	2R	LQ	2R		Not Held			2R	1R	1R	2R
UK Championship	A	A	LQ	LQ	LQ	3R	1R	2R	1R	LQ	1R	1R	SF	1R	SF	4R	2R	3R	4R	1R	2R		4R	3R	LQ	LQ	LQ	LQ	
Shoot Out	Tournament Not Held											Non-Ranking Event						2R	3R	2R	1R		1R	1R	1R	1R	WD	2R	
Scottish Open (Note: The event was called the Players Championship (2003/2004))	A	A	LQ	LQ	LQ	Tournament Not Held								MR	Not Held			3R	QF	1R	3R		QF	LQ	QF	2R	1R	LQ	LQ
German Masters	Tournament Not Held											2R	2R	1R	LQ	LQ	LQ	2R	2R	1R	LQ		LQ	SF	2R	1R	WD	LQ	
Welsh Open	A	A	LQ	LQ	LQ	LQ	1R	1R	LQ	LQ	LQ	1R	LQ	1R	4R	QF	2R	1R	2R	2R	2R		3R	QF	1R	3R	1R	1R	
World Grand Prix	Tournament Not Held															NR	DNQ	1R	1R	DNQ	DNQ		1R	1R	1R	1R	DNQ	DNQ	
Players Championship (Note: The event was called the Players Tour Championship Grand Final (2010/2011–2015/2016))	Tournament Not Held											2R	QF	DNQ	1R	1R	F	DNQ	DNQ	DNQ	DNQ		DNQ	SF	DNQ	DNQ	DNQ	DNQ	
World Open (Note: The event was called the Grand Prix (1999/2000–2000/2001 and 2004/2005–2009/2010) and the LG Cup (2001/2002–2003/2004))	A	A	LQ	LQ	LQ	2R	2R	LQ	2R	1R	1R	QF	1R	QF	3R	Not Held		2R	2R	3R	1R		Not Held			2R	WD	1R	
Tour Championship	Tournament Not Held																			DNQ	DNQ		DNQ	DNQ	DNQ	DNQ	DNQ	DNQ	
World Championship	LQ	LQ	LQ	LQ	LQ	LQ	LQ	LQ	LQ	1R	LQ	1R	LQ	SF	2R	1R	2R	LQ	2R	LQ	LQ		1R	LQ	1R	1R	LQ	LQ	
Non-ranking tournaments
Champion of Champions	Tournament Not Held														1R	QF	A	A	A	A	A		A	A	A	A	A	A	
The Masters	A	A	A	LQ	LQ	A	LQ	LQ	LQ	1R	LQ	A	A	1R	QF	1R	1R	A	A	A	A		A	A	A	A	A	A	
Championship League	Tournament Not Held								A	RR	RR	RR	RR	RR	2R	WD	RR	RR	RR	RR	RR	RR	A	RR	RR	RR	RR	A	
Former ranking tournaments
Thailand Masters	A	A	LQ	NR	Not Held			NR	Tournament Not Held																				
Irish Masters	Non-Ranking Event			LQ	LQ	LQ	NH	NR	Tournament Not Held																				
Northern Ireland Trophy	Tournament Not Held						NR	LQ	LQ	1R	Tournament Not Held																		
Bahrain Championship	Tournament Not Held									1R	Tournament Not Held																		
Wuxi Classic (Note: The event was called the Jiangsu Classic (2008/2009–2009/2010))	Tournament Not Held									Non-Ranking Event				W	1R	2R	Tournament Not Held												
Australian Goldfields Open	Tournament Not Held												LQ	1R	1R	QF	2R	Tournament Not Held											
Shanghai Masters	Tournament Not Held								LQ	W	QF	1R	LQ	2R	1R	1R	WD	1R	LQ	Non-Ranking			Not Held			Non-Ranking Event			
Paul Hunter Classic (Note: The event was called the Grand Prix Fürth (2004/2005) and the Fürth German Open (2005/2006–2006/2007))	Tournament Not Held					Pro-am Event						Minor-Ranking Event						3R	2R	A	NR		Tournament Not Held						
Indian Open	Tournament Not Held														2R	F	NH	1R	3R	LQ	Tournament Not Held								
Riga Masters (Note: The event was called the Riga Open (2014/2015–2015/2016))	Tournament Not Held															Minor-Rank		A	LQ	QF	1R		Tournament Not Held						
China Championship	Tournament Not Held																	NR	LQ	LQ	1R		Tournament Not Held						
WST Pro Series	Tournament Not Held																						2R	Tournament Not Held					
Turkish Masters	Tournament Not Held																							1R	Tournament Not Held				
Gibraltar Open	Tournament Not Held																MR	4R	1R	1R	1R		4R	SF	Tournament Not Held				
WST Classic	Tournament Not Held																								1R	Tournament Not Held			
European Masters (Note: The event was called the European Open (2001/2002–2003/2004) and the Malta Cup (2004/2005–2007/2008))	Not Held		LQ	LQ	LQ	LQ	LQ	1R	NR	Tournament Not Held								2R	LQ	3R	LQ		1R	2R	2R	3R	Not Held		
Saudi Arabia Masters	Tournament Not Held																										3R	3R	NH
Former non-ranking tournaments
Masters Qualifying Event	A	A	A	LQ	LQ	NH	1R	3R	3R	3R	3R	Tournament Not held																	
Hainan Classic	Tournament Not Held											RR	Tournament Not Held																
Brazil Masters	Tournament Not Held												QF	Tournament Not Held															
World Grand Prix	Tournament Not Held															2R	Ranking Event												
General Cup (Note: The event was called the General Cup International (2004/2005, 2009/2010 and 2011/2012))	Tournament Not Held					A	Tournament Not Held				W	NH	F	F	RR	RR	A	Tournament Not Held											
Shoot Out	Tournament Not Held											1R	2R	2R	1R	2R	1R	Ranking Event											
China Championship	Tournament Not Held																	1R	Ranking Event				Tournament Not Held						
Paul Hunter Classic	Tournament Not Held					Pro-am Event						Minor-Ranking Event						Ranking Event			QF		Tournament Not Held						
Six-red World Championship (Note: The event was called the Six-red Snooker International (2008/2009) and the Six-red World Grand Prix (2009/2010))	Tournament Not Held									W	3R	F	NH	SF	3R	F	A	3R	RR	RR	A		Not Held		2R	Tournament Not Held			
Haining Open	Tournament Not Held															Minor-Rank		A	A	A	QF		NH	A	A	Tournament Not Held			

Performance Table Legend
LQ	lost in the qualifying draw	#R	lost in the early rounds of the tournament (WR = Wildcard round, RR = Round robin)	QF	lost in the quarter-finals
SF	lost in the semi-finals	F	lost in the final	W	won the tournament
DNQ	did not qualify for the tournament	A	did not participate in the tournament	WD	withdrew from the tournament

NH / Not Held	means an event was not held.
NR / Non-Ranking Event	means an event is/was no longer a ranking event.
R / Ranking Event	means an event is/was a ranking event.
MR / Minor-Ranking Event	means an event is/was a minor-ranking event.
PA / Pro-am Event	means an event is/was a pro-am event.

== Career finals ==
=== Ranking finals: 6 (3 titles) ===
Outcome	No.	Year	Championship	Opponent in the final	Score
Winner	1.	2008	Shanghai Masters	(England) Ronnie O'Sullivan	10–8
Winner	2.	2012	Wuxi Classic	(England) Stuart Bingham	10–4
Winner	3.	2014	International Championship	(Northern Ireland) Mark Allen	10–7
Runner-up	1.	2015	Indian Open	(Wales) Michael White	0–5
Runner-up	2.	2016	Players Tour Championship Finals	(Northern Ireland) Mark Allen	6–10
Runner-up	3.	2016	China Open	(England) Judd Trump	4–10

=== Minor-ranking finals: 3 (1 title) ===
Outcome	No.	Year	Championship	Opponent in the final	Score
Runner-up	1.	2011	Warsaw Classic	(Australia) Neil Robertson	1–4
Winner	1.	2013	Bluebell Wood Open	(Hong Kong) Marco Fu	4–3
Runner-up	2.	2015	Haining Open	(China) Ding Junhui	3–4

=== Non-ranking finals: 6 (2 titles) ===
Outcome	No.	Year	Championship	Opponent in the final	Score
Winner	1.	2008	Six-red Snooker International	(England) Stuart Bingham	8–3
Winner	2.	2009	General Cup	(China) Liang Wenbo	6–2
Runner-up	1.	2010	Six-red World Championship	(England) Mark Selby	6–8
Runner-up	2.	2011	General Cup	(England) Stephen Lee	6–7
Runner-up	3.	2012	General Cup (2)	(Australia) Neil Robertson	6–7
Runner-up	4.	2014	Six-red World Championship (2)	(Scotland) Stephen Maguire	7–8

=== Pro-am finals: 8 (5 titles) ===
Outcome	No.	Year	Championship	Opponent in the final	Score
Winner	1.	2003	EASB Open Tour Event 4	(England) Jamie Cope	5–1
Winner	2.	2005	Swiss Open	(Republic of Ireland) Ken Doherty	5–3
Winner	3.	2006	Pontins Pro-Am - Event 4	(Wales) Ryan Day	4–2
Runner-up	1.	2006	Pontins World Series Grand Final	(Republic of Ireland) Ken Doherty	2–4
Winner	4.	2007	Ravenace Metals Ltd Invitation Pro-Am	(England) Mark King	5–1
Runner-up	2.	2007	Pontins Pro-Am - Event 4	(England) Jamie Cope	3–4
Runner-up	3.	2007	Pontins World Series Grand Final (2)	(England) Joe Perry	2–4
Winner	5.	2008	Belgian Open	(Scotland) Graeme Dott	4–0

=== Amateur finals: 6 (3 titles) ===
Outcome	No.	Year	Championship	Opponent in the final	Score
Runner-up	1.	1996	UK Under-15 Championship	(England) Shaun Murphy	2–3
Winner	1.	1998	English Under-17 Championship	(England) Stuart Roper	5–3
Winner	2.	1998	Pontins Star of the Future	(England) Mark Selby	3–2
Runner-up	2.	1999	English Under-17 Championship	(England) Kurt Maflin	4–5
Runner-up	3.	2001	English Under-21 Championship	(England) Andrew Norman	4–8
Winner	3.	2001	IBSF World Under-21 Championship	(Northern Ireland) Sean O'Neill	11–5
