= 2013 Welsh Open (snooker) =

2013 BetVictor Welsh Open

Tournament information
- Dates: 11–17 February 2013
- Venue: Newport Centre
- City: Newport
- Country: Wales
- Organisation: World Snooker
- Format: Ranking event
- Total prize fund: £250,000
- Winner's share: £50,000
- Highest break: Mark Selby (ENG) (144)

Final
- Champion: Stephen Maguire (SCO)
- Runner-up: Stuart Bingham (ENG)
- Score: 9–8

The 2013 Welsh Open (officially the 2013 BetVictor Welsh Open) was a professional ranking snooker tournament that took place between 11 and 17 February 2013 at the Newport Centre in Newport, Wales. It was the seventh ranking event of the 2012/2013 season, and the first time that BetVictor sponsored the event.

At the tournament Pankaj Advani became the first Indian player to reach the quarter-final of a ranking event.

Ding Junhui was the defending champion, but he lost in the semi-finals 5–6 against Stuart Bingham.

Stephen Maguire won his fifth ranking title by defeating Bingham 9–8 in the final.

== Prize fund ==
Prize money for the event this year was increased from £201,500 to £250,000, with the winner to receive £50,000 instead of £30,000. The breakdown of prize money for this year is shown below:

- Winner: £50,000
- Runner-up: £30,000
- Semi-finals: £16,000
- Quarter-finals: £10,000
- Last 16: £4,000
- Last 32: £2,000
- Last 64: £1,000
- Non-televised highest break: £500
- Televised highest break: £1,500
- Total: £250,000

== Main draw ==
Last 32; Best of 7 frames
(China) Ding Junhui	4
(England) Mark King	0
(Hong Kong) Marco Fu	2
(Northern Ireland) Mark Allen	4
(Northern Ireland) Gerard Greene	0
(England) Sam Baird	4
(England) Robert Milkins	4
(Wales) Mark Williams	1
(Australia) Neil Robertson	4
(England) Ian Burns	1
(England) Craig Steadman	0
(England) Stuart Bingham	4
(England) Ricky Walden	1
(England) Tom Ford	4
(Republic of Ireland) Ken Doherty	4
(Scotland) John Higgins	1
(England) Judd Trump	4
(Wales) Dominic Dale	3
(England) Andrew Higginson	4
(England) Michael Wasley	2
(Scotland) Graeme Dott	4
(Republic of Ireland) Fergal O'Brien	2
(India) Pankaj Advani	4
(England) Shaun Murphy	3
(Scotland) Stephen Maguire	4
(England) Anthony Hamilton	2
(China) Liang Wenbo	2
(Wales) Matthew Stevens	4
(England) Barry Hawkins	2
(Scotland) Alan McManus	4
(England) Joe Perry	4
(England) Mark Selby	0

Last 16; Best of 7 frames
(China) Ding Junhui	4
(Northern Ireland) Mark Allen	2
(England) Sam Baird	2
(England) Robert Milkins	4
(Australia) Neil Robertson	3
(England) Stuart Bingham	4
(England) Tom Ford	3
(Republic of Ireland) Ken Doherty	4
(England) Judd Trump	4
(England) Andrew Higginson	1
(Scotland) Graeme Dott	1
(India) Pankaj Advani	4
(Scotland) Stephen Maguire	4
(Wales) Matthew Stevens	2
(Scotland) Alan McManus	4
(England) Joe Perry	3

Quarter-finals; Best of 9 frames
(China) Ding Junhui	5
(England) Robert Milkins	1
(England) Stuart Bingham	5
(Republic of Ireland) Ken Doherty	3
(England) Judd Trump	5
(India) Pankaj Advani	2
(Scotland) Stephen Maguire	5
(Scotland) Alan McManus	3

Semi-finals; Best of 11 frames
(China) Ding Junhui	5
(England) Stuart Bingham	6
(England) Judd Trump	4
(Scotland) Stephen Maguire	6

Final; Best of 17 frames
(England) Stuart Bingham	8
(Scotland) Stephen Maguire	9

== Final ==
Final: Best of 17 frames. Referee: Zhu Ying. Newport Centre, Newport, Wales, 17 February 2013.
Stuart Bingham; England	8–9	Stephen Maguire; Scotland
Afternoon: 1–100 (71), 22–77 (62), 63–26 (56), 12–114 (114), 86–0 (79), 0–110 (110), 133–0 (55, 78), 73–25; Evening: 89–11 (73), 16–108 (71), 119–0 (118), 71–8, 50–51, 40–67, 0–77 (77), 72–59 (Bingham 58), 5–92 (82)
118	Highest break	114
1	Century breaks	2
7	50+ breaks	7

== Qualifying ==
These matches were held between 6 and 9 February 2013 at the World Snooker Academy in Sheffield, England, and on 11 February 2013 at the Newport Centre in Newport, Wales.

=== Round 1 ===
(England) Ben Woollaston	2–4	(Thailand) Dechawat Poomjaeng
(England) Dave Harold	2–4	(India) Aditya Mehta
(Wales) Jamie Jones	1–4	(Thailand) Passakorn Suwannawat
(England) Barry Pinches	4–1	(England) Simon Bedford
(Northern Ireland) Gerard Greene	4–3	(England) David Grace
(Belgium) Luca Brecel	1–4	(England) Sam Baird
(Wales) Michael White	2–4	(England) Paul Davison
(China) Liu Chuang	4–2	(China) Chen Zhe
(England) Andy Hicks	3–4	(Wales) Duane Jones
(England) Jack Lisowski	1–4	(England) Ian Burns
(China) Yu Delu	0–4	(England) Craig Steadman
(England) Matthew Selt	4–1	(Northern Ireland) Jordan Brown
(China) Cao Yupeng	2–4	(England) Martin O'Donnell
(China) Xiao Guodong	3–4	(England) Justin Astley
(England) David Gilbert	4–0	(Thailand) Thanawat Thirapongpaiboon
(England) Rory McLeod	2–4	(Wales) Gareth Allen

(England) Mike Dunn	4–1	(England) Liam Highfield
(Thailand) James Wattana	3–4	(Wales) Daniel Wells
(England) Adam Duffy	4–2	(Egypt) Mohamed Khairy
(Scotland) Anthony McGill	1–4	(England) Michael Wasley
(England) Rod Lawler	4–3	(China) Li Yan
(England) Nigel Bond	4–1	(England) Joel Walker
(England) Peter Lines	1–4	(India) Pankaj Advani
(Thailand) Thepchaiya Un-Nooh	4–3	(Scotland) Michael Leslie
(England) Mark Joyce	4–2	(China) Tian Pengfei
(England) Anthony Hamilton	4–1	(England) Sean O'Sullivan
(China) Liang Wenbo	4–0	(Malta) Tony Drago
(England) Alfie Burden	4–3	(Scotland) Scott Donaldson
(England) Jimmy White	2–4	(China) Zhang Anda
(Scotland) Alan McManus	4–2	(England) Jamie O'Neill
(England) Jimmy Robertson	4–3	(England) Robbie Williams
(England) Steve Davis	4–2	(Norway) Kurt Maflin

=== Round 2 ===
(China) Ding Junhui (Note: Matches were held over and played in Newport.)	4–2	(Thailand) Dechawat Poomjaeng
(England) Mark King	4–0	(India) Aditya Mehta
(Hong Kong) Marco Fu	4–1	(Thailand) Passakorn Suwannawat
(Northern Ireland) Mark Allen	4–2	(England) Barry Pinches
(England) Ali Carter	2–4	(Northern Ireland) Gerard Greene
(England) Martin Gould	3–4	(England) Sam Baird
(England) Robert Milkins	4–2	(England) Paul Davison
(Wales) Mark Williams	4–1	(China) Liu Chuang
(Australia) Neil Robertson	4–3	(Wales) Duane Jones
(England) Jamie Cope	w/d–w/o	(England) Ian Burns
(Scotland) Jamie Burnett	1–4	(England) Craig Steadman
(England) Stuart Bingham	4–2	(England) Matthew Selt
(England) Ricky Walden	4–2	(England) Martin O'Donnell
(England) Tom Ford	4–0	(England) Justin Astley
(Republic of Ireland) Ken Doherty	4–0	(England) David Gilbert
(Scotland) John Higgins	4–1	(Wales) Gareth Allen

(England) Judd Trump	4–0	(England) Mike Dunn
(Wales) Dominic Dale	4–1	(Wales) Daniel Wells
(England) Andrew Higginson	4–0	(England) Adam Duffy
(England) Mark Davis	2–4	(England) Michael Wasley
(Scotland) Graeme Dott	4–1	(England) Rod Lawler
(Republic of Ireland) Fergal O'Brien	4–1	(England) Nigel Bond
(England) Peter Ebdon	3–4	(India) Pankaj Advani
(England) Shaun Murphy	4–2	(Thailand) Thepchaiya Un-Nooh
(Scotland) Stephen Maguire	4–3	(England) Mark Joyce
(Scotland) Marcus Campbell	1–4	(England) Anthony Hamilton
(Wales) Ryan Day	1–4	(China) Liang Wenbo
(Wales) Matthew Stevens	4–2	(England) Alfie Burden
(England) Barry Hawkins	4–1	(China) Zhang Anda
(England) Michael Holt	0–4	(Scotland) Alan McManus
(England) Joe Perry	4–1	(England) Jimmy Robertson
(England) Mark Selby	4–0	(England) Steve Davis

== Century breaks ==
=== Qualifying stage centuries ===
- 145 – Shaun Murphy
- 140 – Ricky Walden
- 136 – Alan McManus
- 120 – Craig Steadman
- 113 – Ken Doherty
- 110 – David Gilbert
- 107 – Jamie O'Neill
- 107 – Martin O'Donnell
- 105 – Michael White
- 105 – Steve Davis
- 104 – Sam Baird
- 101 – Gerard Greene
- 100 – Tom Ford
- 100 – Graeme Dott

=== Televised stage centuries ===
- 144 – Mark Selby
- 137, 115, 107, 107, 104 – Ding Junhui
- 127, 120, 118, 108 – Stuart Bingham
- 121, 100 – Pankaj Advani
- 114, 110, 106, 100 – Stephen Maguire
- 114 – Dominic Dale
- 111 – Joe Perry
- 108 – Robert Milkins
- 105 – Liang Wenbo
- 101 – John Higgins
- 101 – Tom Ford
- 100 – Anthony Hamilton
- 100 – Andrew Higginson
- 100 – Judd Trump
