= 2012 General Cup =

General Cup
Tournament information
- Dates: 11–14 September 2012
- Venue: General Snooker Club
- Country: Hong Kong
- Format: Non-ranking event

Final
- Champion: (Australia) Neil Robertson
- Runner-up: (England) Ricky Walden
- Score: 7–6

The 2012 General Cup was a professional non-ranking snooker tournament that took place between 11 and 14 September 2012 at the General Snooker Club in Hong Kong.

Stephen Lee was the defending champion, but did not participate this year.

Neil Robertson won the title by defeating Ricky Walden 7–6 in the final.

== Wildcard round ==
Match		Score	
WC1	Liang Wenbo (CHN)	4–2	Cheng Yin Lun (HKG)
WC2	Tian Pengfei (CHN)	4–2	Lau Ka Lam (HKG)
WC3	Barry Hawkins (ENG)	2–4	Fung Kwok Wai (HKG)
WC4	Mark Davis (ENG)	4–1	Chan Ka Kin (HKG)

== Round robin stage ==
=== Group A ===
POS	Player	MP	MW	FW	FL	FD	PTS
1	(Australia) Neil Robertson	2	1	8	7	+1	1
2	(China) Liang Wenbo	2	1	7	7	0	1
3	(Hong Kong) Fung Kwok Wai	2	1	7	8	−1	1

- Fung Kwok Wai 2–5 Liang Wenbo
- Neil Robertson 5–2 Liang Wenbo
- Neil Robertson 3–5 Fung Kwok Wai

=== Group B ===
POS	Player	MP	MW	FW	FL	FD	PTS
1	(England) Ricky Walden	2	2	10	5	+5	2
2	(England) Mark Davis	2	1	7	8	−1	1
3	(China) Tian Pengfei	2	0	6	10	−4	0

- Ricky Walden 5–3 Tian Pengfei
- Mark Davis 5–3 Tian Pengfei
- Ricky Walden 5–2 Mark Davis

== Final ==
Final: Best of 13 frames. 14 September 2012, General Snooker Club, Hong Kong.
Neil Robertson; Australia	7–6	Ricky Walden; England
