= 2011 General Cup International =

General Cup

Tournament information
- Dates: 4–7 July 2011
- Venue: General Snooker Club
- Country: Hong Kong
- Format: Non-ranking event
- Winner's share: $50,000

Final
- Champion: (England) Stephen Lee
- Runner-up: (England) Ricky Walden
- Score: 7–6

The 2011 General Cup was a professional non-ranking snooker tournament that took place between 4–7 July 2011 at the General Snooker Club in Hong Kong.

Stephen Lee won in the final 7–6 against Ricky Walden.

== Prize fund ==
The breakdown of prize money for this year is shown below:

- Winner: $50,000
- Runner-up: $25,000
- 2nd in group: $15,000
- 3rd in group: $8,000
- Century break: $2,000
- Highest break (>100): $20,000
- Highest break (<100): $10,000
- Maximum break: $147,000

== Round robin stage ==
=== Group A ===
POS	Player	MP	MW	FW	FL	FD	PTS
1	(England) Stephen Lee	2	2	10	3	+7	2
2	(England) Tom Ford	2	1	5	8	−3	1
3	(Thailand) Thepchaiya Un-Nooh	2	0	6	10	−4	0

- Tom Ford 5–3 Thepchaiya Un-Nooh
- Stephen Lee 5–3 Thepchaiya Un-Nooh
- Stephen Lee 5–0 Tom Ford

=== Group B ===
POS	Player	MP	MW	FW	FL	FD	PTS
1	(England) Ricky Walden	2	2	10	4	+6	2
2	(Hong Kong) Marco Fu	2	1	9	6	+3	1
3	(Thailand) Noppadol Sangnil	2	0	1	10	−9	0

- Marco Fu 5–1 Noppadol Sangnil
- Ricky Walden 5–0 Noppadol Sangnil
- Ricky Walden 5–4 Marco Fu

== Final ==
Final: Best of 13 frames. 7 July 2011, General Snooker Club, Hong Kong.
Stephen Lee; England	7–6	Ricky Walden; England

== Century breaks ==
- 128, 100 – Ricky Walden
- 108 – Stephen Lee
