= Liang Wenbo =

Chinese snooker player (born 1987)

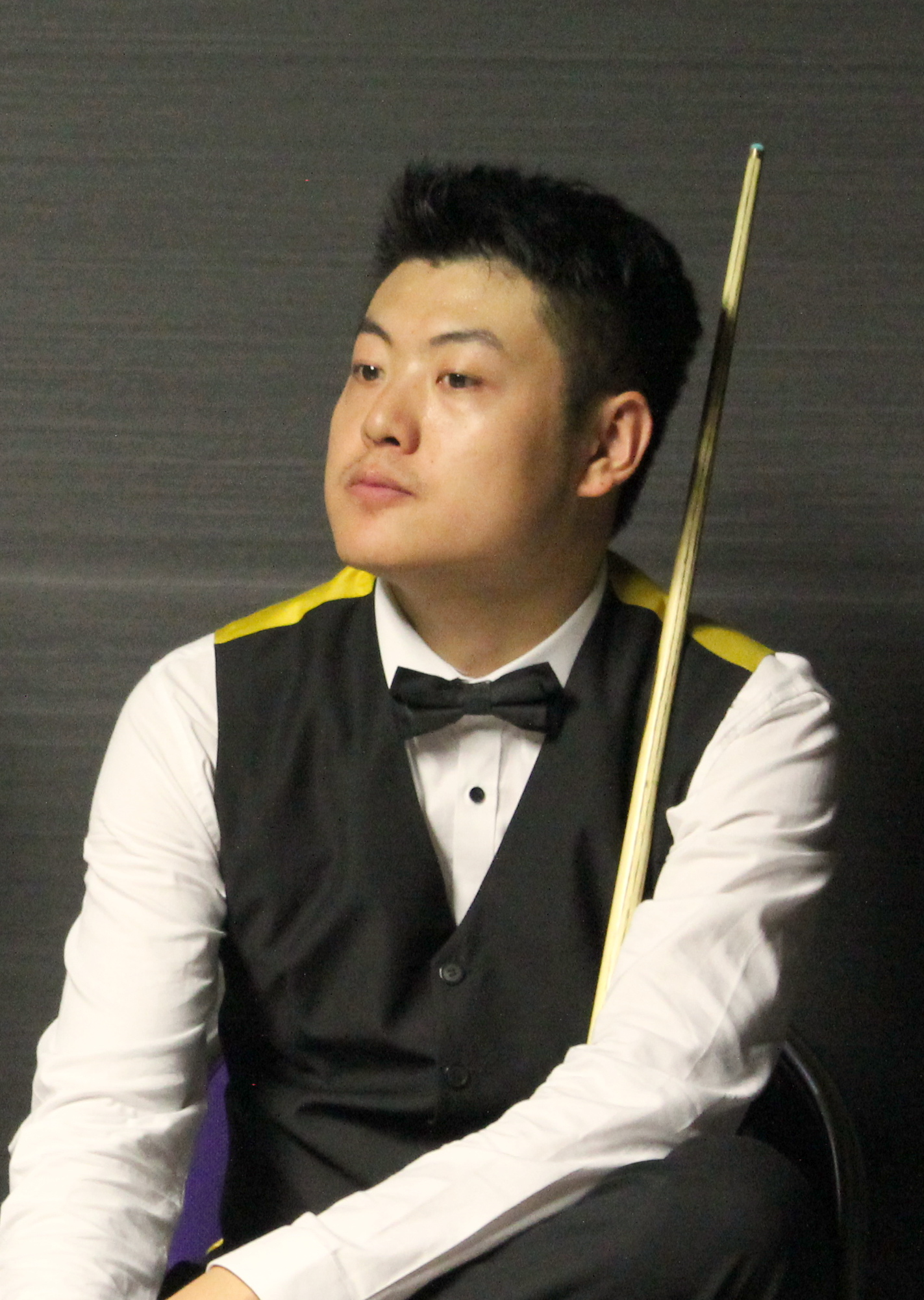
- Liang at the 2016 Paul Hunter Classic

Personal information
- Nickname: The Firecracker
- Born: 5 March 1987 (age 39) Zhaodong, Heilongjiang, China

Sport
- Country: China
- Sport: Snooker
- Professional: 2005–2023
- Highest ranking: 11 (October, December 2016, May 2017)
- Maximum breaks: 3
- Century breaks: 292

Tournament wins
- Ranking: 1
- Minor-ranking: 1
Medal record
Representing China
Men's snooker
World Games
Silver medal – second place	2013 Cali	Singles
Asian Games
Silver medal – second place	2006 Doha	Singles
Gold medal – first place	2006 Doha	Team
Gold medal – first place	2010 Guangzhou	Team
Asian Indoor Games
Silver medal – second place	2009 Ho Chi Minh City	Six-red singles
Asian Indoor and Martial Arts Games
Gold medal – first place	2013 Incheon	Team

Liang Wenbo
- Chinese: 梁文博
Transcriptions
Standard Mandarin
- Hanyu Pinyin: Liáng Wénbó
- Wade–Giles: Liang^{2} Wên^{2}po^{2}
- IPA: [ljǎŋ wə̌npwǒ]

Liang Wenbo (Chinese: 梁文博; born 5 March 1987) is a Chinese former professional snooker player. During his playing career, he won one ranking title at the 2016 English Open, twice won the World Cup for China in 2011 and 2017 with teammate Ding Junhui, and was runner-up at the 2009 Shanghai Masters and the 2015 UK Championship. He made 292 century breaks in professional competition, including three maximum breaks, and reached a career high of 11th in the snooker world rankings.

In April 2022, Liang was convicted of domestic assault, after which the World Professional Billiards and Snooker Association (WPBSA) suspended him for four months. It suspended him again in October 2022 while investigating match-fixing allegations that later widened to implicate nine other Chinese players. A disciplinary tribunal found Liang guilty of multiple match-fixing offences as well as destroying evidence and not cooperating with the investigation. In June 2023, the WPBSA permanently banned Liang and compatriot Li Hang from the sport, the only two lifetime bans ever handed down in professional snooker. The Chinese Billiards and Snooker Association (CBSA) upheld the WPBSA's decision.

== Career ==
=== Early career ===
As an amateur player, Liang reached the quarter-finals of the 2003 IBSF World Snooker Championship, and the following year, he reached the semi-finals of the under-21 division of the same event. In the fourth International Open Series event, Liang reached the final. At the 2006 Asian Games, Liang won the silver medal in the singles event, losing 2–4 in the final to Ding Junhui, and competed in the Chinese team at the event alongside Ding and Tian Pengfei and was part of the winning trio in the team event. Liang joined the Challenge Tour during the 2004–05 snooker season, which was the tier below the World Snooker Association Main Tour. He finished 104th out of 168 competitors, accumulating 2150 points.

Liang won the 2005 IBSF World Under-21 Championship, for which he received a wildcard nomination to the Main World Snooker Tour despite not qualifying directly, because not all of the players that were eligible took their places. In his first ranking tournament, the Grand Prix, he lost in the first qualifying round to Rory McLeod 2–5. At the next ranking event, the 2005 UK Championship, he defeated Alfred Burden in the first qualifying round 9–1, but subsequently lost in the second qualifying round to Marcus Campbell 8–9. At the 2006 Welsh Open, he defeated Sean Storey, Jamie Burnett, and Rory McLeod to reach the main draw of a ranking event for the first time. He completed a whitewash of Nigel Bond in the first round 5–0, but lost to Graeme Dott 3–5.

At the 2006 Malta Cup, he lost in the first qualifying round to Paul Davies 3–5. At the 2006 China Open, he beat David McDonnell and Matthew Couch before losing against Adrian Gunnell 3–5 in the third qualifying round. In qualifying for the 2005 World Snooker Championship, he lost to Joe Delaney 5–10 in the first qualifying round. Liang ended his debut season on the professional tour ranked 78th, a position that did not guarantee a place in the following season's tour; however, he had finished inside the top 8 of the one-year ranking list of those who had not qualified, which gave him a place on the main tour for the next season.

During the 2006–07 season, Liang reached at least the second round of qualifying in every ranking event. At the Northern Ireland Trophy, he beat Robert Stephen 5–0 before falling to David Gilbert 0–5 in qualifying. At the Grand Prix, Liang came out on top of his qualifying group, above more experienced players such as Gerard Greene and Barry Pinches. He finished fourth in his group at the round-robin stage, and although he did not progress to the next round, he defeated world number one Stephen Hendry 3–0. At the 2006 UK Championship, he lost in the second round of qualifying to Jamie Burnett 7–9. In the following ranking event, the 2007 Malta Cup, he lost to Joe Jogia 3–5, again in the second round of qualifying. He qualified for the 2007 Welsh Open, his third-ranking tournament, by beating Dene O'Kane, Jogia, and Mark Davis. He met Nigel Bond again in the last 48, this time losing 3–5.

At the 2007 China Open, he beat Robert Stephen before losing to Finland's Robin Hull. At the 2007 World Snooker Championship, he beat Jeff Cundy before losing to Mike Dunn. Liang finished the season in 66th place, just outside the top 64. However, this time he topped the one-year ranking list to ensure his place on the Tour for next season.

=== Becoming a top 64-player ===
At the 2007 Shanghai Masters, Liang was defeated in the last qualifying round by Nigel Bond, who beat him 5–3. At the 2007 Northern Ireland Trophy, he defeated Fraser Patrick, Joe Delaney, and Rory McLeod to qualify. He faced Gerard Greene in the last 48, but lost 2–5. Liang was defeated in the second qualifying round for the 2007 UK Championship, losing to David Roe 2–9. He also failed to qualify for the 2008 Welsh Open, when he was beaten in the last qualifying round by Andrew Norman 2–5. He didn't win a match at the 2008 China Open, losing in the first qualifying round to Steve Mifsud, who, at the end of this season, was ranked 54 places below Liang.

At the 2008 World Snooker Championship, Liang was one of three Chinese player to qualify for the main draw, defeating Ben Woollaston, Rod Lawler, David Gilbert, and Ian McCulloch in the qualifying rounds. He met former winner Ken Doherty in the first round and defeated him 10–5. Leading 12–10 in the second round against Joe Swail, Liang prematurely celebrated winning the match after potting match ball, only to lose the frame. Swail came back to level the match at 12–12, but Liang won 13–12. Liang faced Ronnie O'Sullivan in the quarter-final, losing 7–13. His run to the quarter-finals of the World Championship gained him 5,000 ranking points, as he finished 40th in the world at the end of the season.

At the 2008 Northern Ireland Trophy, he beat Steve Davis and Peter Ebdon to reach the last 16, where he lost to John Higgins 1–5. This result lifted him to a career high of 26 in the world. He reached the main draw of the 2008 Grand Prix by winning two qualifying matches, but then succumbed to O'Sullivan in the first round of the main draw. Liang made his first professional maximum break in a 5–1 victory over Martin Gould in the third qualifying round of the Bahrain Championship. However, he failed to qualify for the main draw, losing 2–5 to Michael Judge.

For the two Chinese events on this season's tour, Liang's two qualifying matches were held over until the venue stages. At the 2008 Shanghai Masters, he defeated Atthasit Mahitthi and Mark Allen to reach the main draw but lost to Ryan Day 0–5 in the first round. At the 2009 World Snooker Championship, after defeating Dave Harold 10–3 in the last qualifying round, he lost 8–10 in the first round of the main draw against Ding.

=== First ranking event final ===
In July 2009, Liang won his first professional title, the 2009 Beijing International Challenge, defeating Stephen Maguire 7–6 in the final. At the 2009 Shanghai Masters, he reached the final of his first ranking event, becoming the second Chinese player to do so (after Ding Junhui). He ultimately finished runner-up to O'Sullivan.

Liang qualified for the 2009 Grand Prix, but was defeated 2–5 by Peter Ebdon in the first round, winning the first two frames and losing the last five in succession. Prior to this meeting, he had played Ebdon twice, winning 5–1 and 5–0. He reached the quarter-finals of the 2009 UK Championship after defeating Ryan Day 9–3 and Mark King 9–2. He went on to lose 2–9 to John Higgins in the quarter-finals. He failed to qualify for the 2010 Welsh Open and the China Open, as he lost 3–5 against Michael Judge and 2–5 against Andrew Higginson, respectively. Liang qualified for the 2010 World Snooker Championship by defeating Rod Lawler 10–2. He was drawn against O'Sullivan but lost 7–10. Liang finished the season ranked 16th in the world.

At the 2010 Wuxi Classic, he lost in the first round 2–5 against Marco Fu. He participated in the 2010 Beijing International Challenge to defend his first professional title, but lost in the semi-finals 4–6 against eventual winner Tian Pengfei. Liang failed to qualify for the World Open, as he lost 1–3 against Andrew Higginson and lost his first round match at the Shanghai Masters 3–5 against Matthew Stevens. Having started the season inside the top 16, his results were not sufficient to maintain that position, and he slipped out of the top 16. After this, he lost his qualifying matches in the five ranking tournaments.

Liang also participated in the Players Tour Championship, his best performance coming at the third European event, where he reached the final but lost 0–4 against Marcus Campbell. After 12 out of 12 events, he was ranked 14th in the Players Tour Championship Order of Merit. He lost his first round match at the Players Tour Finals 1–4 against Ricky Walden.

Alongside Ding, he represented China at the 2011 World Cup, which they won with a 4–2 victory against the Northern Ireland team. During his match against Matthew Stevens in the first round of the 2011 Australian Goldfields Open, Liang had a chance to make his second maximum break in his career, but he snookered himself on the yellow ball, and the break ended at 120. He won the match 5–4 to reach the second round, where he lost 4–5 against Ken Doherty. He also qualified for the 2011 Shanghai Masters but lost in the first round 1–5 against Neil Robertson. After this, he was unable to qualify for the next two ranking events, as he lost 2–6 against Michael White at the 2011 UK Championship and 3–5 against Liu Chuang at the 2012 German Masters.

He beat David Gilbert and Rory McLeod to reach the first round of the 2012 Welsh Open, where he faced John Higgins, being defeated 1–4. He narrowly missed out on a place in the 2012 World Open as he was defeated 4–5 by Mark King in the final round of qualifying. He also lost in qualifying for the 2012 China Open to the eventual winner of the event, Peter Ebdon, 0–5.

He qualified for the 2012 World Snooker Championship by defeating Marcus Campbell 10–9. However, he lost on a deciding frame to John Higgins 9–10 in the first round, finishing the season ranked world number 37.

Liang lost in qualifying for both the 2012 Wuxi Classic and the Shanghai Masters to Rod Lawler. He reached the venue stage of the Australian Goldfields Open by beating Thanawat Thirapongpaiboon, but lost 3–5 in the first round against Matthew Stevens. Liang beat Anthony McGill and Andrew Higginson to qualify for the 2012 UK Championship, where he saw a 4–3 lead in the first round against Barry Hawkins turn into a 4–6 defeat. Liang failed to qualify for the next two events but won two matches to enter the main draw of both the 2013 Welsh Open and the China Open. In Wales, he lost 2–4 to Stevens in the first round, and in his homeland of China, he beat Lu Ning 5–1 in the wildcard round before losing 3–5 to Stuart Bingham in the first round. Liang had a very consistent season in the Players Tour Championship series as he advanced to, but not past, the last 16 in five of the ten events. This saw him placed 27th on the Order of Merit, the season ending leaderboard, one spot short of making the Players Tour Finals. Liang's season ended when he was beaten 6–10 by Mark Davis in the final round of qualification for the World Championship. His end-of-year ranking was world number 32.

=== English Masters champion and UK Championship finalist ===
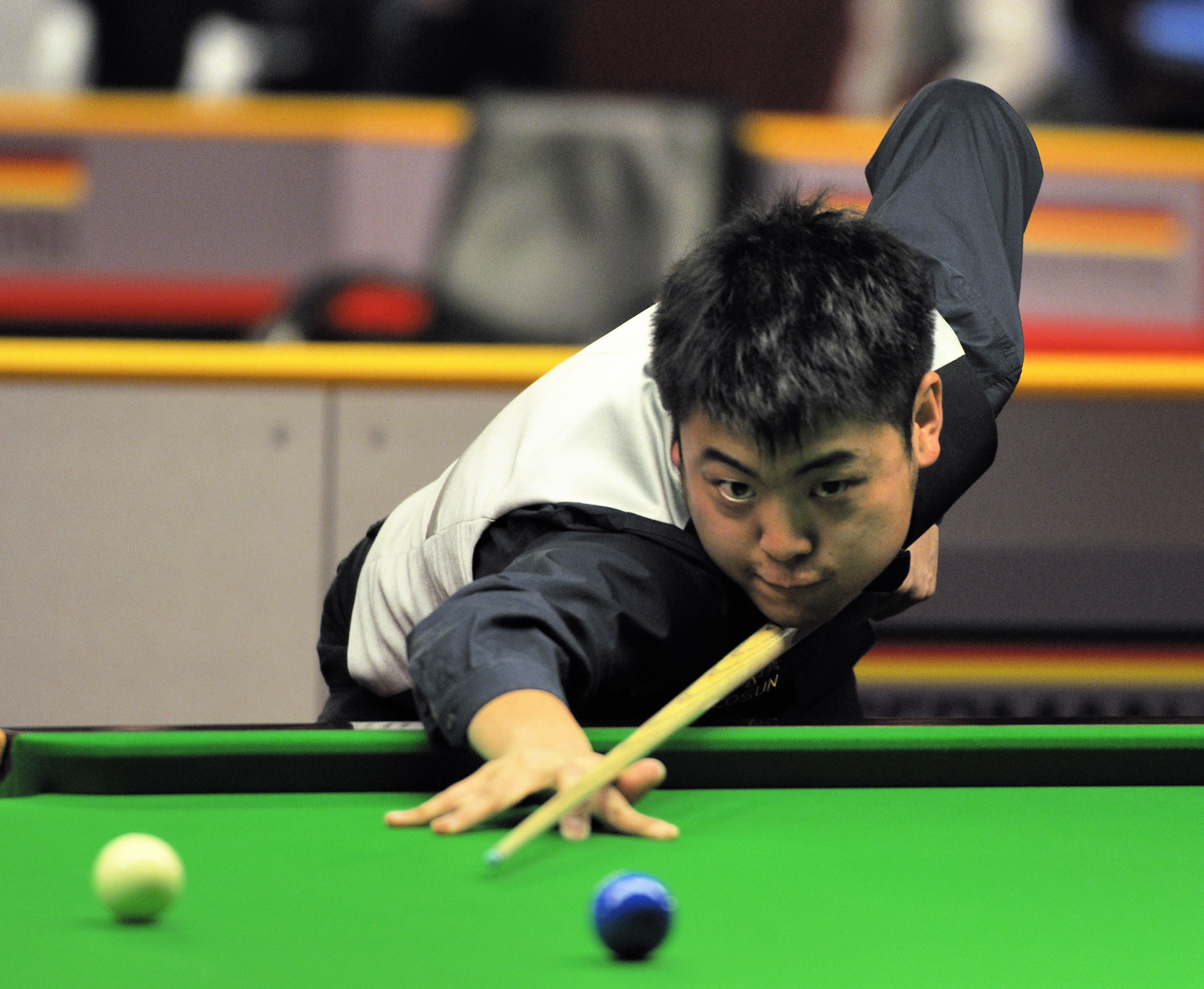
Liang at the 2014 German Masters

In July 2013, Liang reached the final of the World Games, but lost the gold medal match 0–3 to Aditya Mehta. He had an excellent season in the Asian Tour events by reaching the semi-finals of the Zhangjiagang Open, where he was defeated 1–4 by Michael Holt, and at the Zhengzhou Open, where Liang won his first individual title on the World Snooker Tour. He beat Anthony McGill 4–3 in the semi-finals before whitewashing Lü Haotian 4–0 to claim the £10,000 first prize. In the full ranking events, Liang won five successive frames against defending world champion Ronnie O'Sullivan in the second round of the International Championship to triumph 6–4, which marked his first ever success over his opponent after losing in all four previous attempts. He then defeated Mark Davis 6–1 to reach the quarter-finals of a ranking event for the first time in four years, where he lost 3–6 against Graeme Dott. Liang reached the last 16 of both the German Masters and Welsh Open, losing 2–5 to Mark Davis and 2–4 to Barry Hawkins, respectively. A second final on the Asian Tour followed at the Dongguan Open, where Stuart Bingham made four breaks above 50 to defeat him 4–1, but Liang still topped the Order of Merit to qualify for the Finals. There, he was beaten 2–4 by Yu Delu, and Liang was defeated 7–10 by Martin Gould in the final round of World Championship qualifying.

Liang overcame Jamie Burnett 5–1 in the first round of the 2014 Wuxi Classic and then inflicted the first defeat on Mark Selby since he won the World Championship, beating him 5–3. In the last 16, Liang was knocked out 2–5 by Joe Perry. He lost 3–5 against Robert Milkins in the opening round of the 2014 Australian Goldfields Open, and in the wildcard round of the Shanghai Masters, 1–5 to Yan Bingtao. He failed to get past the last 64 of the next two ranking events but won two matches to reach the 2015 German Masters, where he eliminated Li Hang 5–1 in the first round. He reached the quarter-finals by coming back from 3–4 down against Stuart Bingham to win 5–4 on the final pink. He also defeated Ryan Day 5–4 to play in his second career ranking event semi-final, where he took four frames in a row to hold a narrow 4–3 advantage over Shaun Murphy before losing three successive frames in a 4–6 defeat. Liang did not drop a single frame in defeating both Cao Xinlong and Gerard Greene at the 2015 Welsh Open, but was then the victim of a whitewash by John Higgins in the third round. At the inaugural World Grand Prix, he lost 3–4 to Graeme Dott in the second round. In the final round of 2015 World Snooker Championship qualifying, he lost the last three frames against compatriot Zhang Anda to be defeated 9–10.

Liang reached the final of the invitational tournament, the 2015 Six-red World Championship, but was heavily beaten 2–8 by Thepchaiya Un-Nooh. In the third round of the 2015 UK Championship, he trailed Judd Trump by three frames but won 6–4. He then defeated Tom Ford 6–5, after which Ford accused Liang of "boring him off the table" with slow play. Liang opened his quarter-final match against Marco Fu with three centuries and hung on to edge it 6–5, then came from 2–4 behind to reach the final by beating David Grace 6–4. It was the first final of the event to feature two players from outside the United Kingdom; Liang lost the match 5–10 to Neil Robertson. A week later, he progressed to the semi-finals of the Gibraltar Open, but was whitewashed 0–4 by Fu.

Liang's UK Championship final helped him break back into the top 16 in the world rankings to make his debut at the 2016 Masters, where he was knocked out 4–6 by John Higgins in the opening round. He was whitewashed 0–4 by Shaun Murphy in the quarter-finals of the World Grand Prix. After winning three matches to qualify for the 2016 World Snooker Championship, Liang lost 8–10 to Judd Trump after an earlier 7–3 lead.

In the first round of the 2016 Shanghai Masters, Liang was narrowly beaten 5–4 by O'Sullivan. He won five matches at the 2016 English Open, which included a 4–3 second round victory over Shaun Murphy, to reach the semi-finals. From 3–4 down, Liang defeated Stuart Bingham 6–5 to reach his third ranking event final. In the final, he ended Judd Trump's 14-match winning streak with a 9–6 victory. He became the second player from mainland China to win a ranking event and thanked O'Sullivan (with whom he practiced daily) for his help. The win also gave him entry to his first Champion of Champions, where he lost 0–4 in the opening round to Mark Selby.

=== Final playing years ===
In the 2016 Scottish Open, Liang reached the quarter-finals, where he lost to Yu Delu 4–5. In the Masters, he was one pot away from defeating O'Sullivan 6–4, instead going on to lose 5–6. A 4–0 defeat of Dominic Dale and a pair of 4–3 victories over Mark Allen and Joe Perry moved Liang into the semi-finals of the 2017 World Grand Prix, where he was defeated 1–6 by Barry Hawkins. In the second round of the 2017 World Snooker Championship, Liang trailed Ding Junhui 2–6 after the first session and 7–9 after the second. He then won a trio of frames to take the lead in the match for the first time at 12–11, but lost the match 12–13. After the event, his end-of-season ranking rose to 11, which was his career-high.

Still ranked within the top 16, Liang gained entry to the 2018 Masters, where he led 5–4, but lost the match 5–6. Having dropped to 19th in the world, Liang was forced to qualify for the 2018 World Snooker Championship. In the tenth frame of his match against Lawler, he made his third career maximum break and had an opportunity to make another one in the twelfth frame, missing the final black ball. After defeating Lawler, he was whitewashed by Jamie Jones. Liang was the highest-ranked player not to make the main tournament.

With Liang's ranking dropping, he reached only the third round of three ranking events during the 2018–19 snooker season: the 2018 European Masters, the 2019 China Open, and the 2019 China Championship, in which he advanced to the third round. Liang finished the season ranked 41st in the world.

At the 2019 UK Championship, he defeated Dominic Dale, David Grace, Eden Sharav, and Li Hang, to reach the quarter-finals. Facing eventual champion Ding, he lost 2–6. Liang also reached the quarter-finals of the Gibraltar Open, losing 4–1 to Judd Trump.

Liang reached the semi-finals of the 2022 European Masters, defeating top-16 players Murphy and McGill before being defeated 2–6 by O'Sullivan. He also reached the semi-final of the single-frame tournament, the 2022 Snooker Shoot Out, where he lost to winner Hossein Vafaei. At the invitational version of the 2022 Championship League, Liang won group one and qualified for the last four during the Winner's Group. Liang lost 2–3 to Bingham, having been docked a frame for turning up late. The final tournament for which Liang qualified was the 2022 Welsh Open, where he lost 3–4 in the opening round to Ben Woollaston.

=== Domestic assault conviction and suspension ===
In the early hours of 20 July 2021, Liang was captured on CCTV repeatedly punching and kicking a woman during an argument in Sheffield city centre. The victim made an emergency call, during which she was reported to be screaming in distress. After pleading guilty to domestic assault at Sheffield Magistrates' Court on 9 February 2022, Liang was sentenced on 1 April to a 12-month community order plus a £1,380 fine. Sheffield Heeley MP Louise Haigh called the outcome "a shockingly pathetic sentence for such a violent and appalling assault" and called for Liang to be banned from the upcoming 2022 World Snooker Championship.

The day after the sentencing, the WPBSA suspended Liang from professional competition with immediate effect, making him ineligible to compete in the World Championship qualifiers, which began on 4 April. The WPBSA held a disciplinary hearing on 26 May, at which Liang accepted that he had breached the WPBSA Members' Rules and his contract with World Snooker Limited by engaging in behaviour unbecoming of a sportsperson and by bringing the sport into disrepute. The WPBSA suspended him for a total of four months, until 1 August, and ordered him to pay £1,000 towards the costs of the hearing. Liang returned to competition at the 2022 British Open qualifiers.

=== Match-fixing investigation and permanent ban ===
The WPBSA suspended Liang again on 27 October 2022 due to misconduct allegations. It later disclosed that it was investigating Liang for match-fixing offences. It subsequently suspended nine other Chinese players as part of the same investigation, which became the biggest match-fixing inquiry in the sport's history. In January 2023, the WPBSA charged Liang with "being concerned in fixing matches and approaching players to fix matches on the World Snooker Tour, seeking to obstruct the investigation and failing to cooperate with the WPBSA investigation."

An independent disciplinary tribunal began hearing cases against the suspended Chinese players in April 2023. It found Liang guilty of fixing or conspiring to fix the results of five matches in total and of inducing players to fix the results of nine matches. It also found him guilty of betting on matches, threatening players, destroying evidence, and not cooperating with the investigation. In June 2023, the WPBSA announced that it had banned Liang from the sport for life and ordered him to pay £43,000 in costs. It also banned Li Hang for life and banned the other eight players involved for lengthy periods.

The CBSA launched its own investigation after the WPBSA investigation concluded. It also banned Liang and Li for life, preventing them from taking part in any organised snooker competition in China.

== Personal life ==
In December 2011, Liang joined Romford-based snooker academy and management team Grove Leisure. Liang is married to Chen Xuejiao and the couple have one child. In 2020, prior to the World Grand Prix, Liang had pledged to donate any money he would receive at the tournament to the Huizhou Red Cross in response to the coronavirus outbreak in China.

== Performance and rankings timeline ==
Performance table legend
LQ	Lost in the qualifying draw	#R	Lost in the early rounds of the tournament (WR = Wildcard round, RR = Round robin)	QF	Lost in the quarter-finals
SF	Lost in the semi-finals	F	Lost in the final	W	Won the tournament
DNQ	Did not qualify for the tournament	A	Did not participate in the tournament	WD	Withdrew from the tournament

NH / Not Held	An event was not held.
NR / Non-Ranking Event	An event is/was no longer a ranking event.
R / Ranking Event	An event is/was a ranking event.
MR / Minor-Ranking Event	An event is/was a minor-ranking event.
PA / Pro-am Event	An event is/was a pro-am event.

Tournament	2004/ 05	2005/ 06	2006/ 07	2007/ 08	2008/ 09	2009/ 10	2010/ 11	2011/ 12	2012/ 13	2013/ 14	2014/ 15	2015/ 16	2016/ 17	2017/ 18	2018/ 19	2019/ 20	2020/ 21	2021/ 22	2022/ 23
Ranking (Note: It shows the ranking at the beginning of the season)	(Note: He was an amateur)	(Note: New players don't have a ranking)	73	66	40	27	16	30	37	32	26	22	17	11	19	41	35	27	40
Ranking tournaments
Championship League	Not Held			Non-Ranking Event													RR	A	A
European Masters (Note: The event was called the Malta Cup (2004/2005–2007/2008))	A	LQ	LQ	NR	Tournament Not Held								2R	A	3R	1R	1R	SF	A
British Open	A	Tournament Not Held																2R	LQ
Northern Ireland Open	Tournament Not Held												2R	2R	WD	2R	3R	1R	LQ
UK Championship	A	LQ	LQ	LQ	LQ	QF	LQ	LQ	1R	3R	2R	F	2R	3R	1R	QF	3R	1R	WD
Scottish Open	Tournament Not Held								MR	Not Held			QF	2R	1R	1R	3R	2R	WD
English Open	Tournament Not Held												W	3R	2R	1R	3R	LQ	LQ
World Grand Prix	Tournament Not Held										NR	QF	SF	DNQ	DNQ	2R	1R	DNQ	DNQ
Shoot Out	Tournament Not Held						Non-Ranking Event						2R	A	A	3R	3R	SF	A
German Masters	Tournament Not Held						LQ	LQ	LQ	3R	SF	1R	WD	2R	LQ	LQ	1R	WD	A
Welsh Open	A	2R	1R	LQ	LQ	LQ	LQ	1R	1R	4R	3R	3R	2R	4R	2R	1R	1R	1R	A
Players Championship (Note: The event was called the Players Tour Championship Grand Final (2010/2011–2015/2016))	Tournament Not Held						1R	DNQ	DNQ	1R	DNQ	1R	1R	DNQ	DNQ	DNQ	DNQ	DNQ	DNQ
Tour Championship	Tournament Not Held														DNQ	DNQ	DNQ	DNQ	DNQ
World Championship	LQ	LQ	LQ	QF	1R	1R	LQ	1R	LQ	LQ	LQ	1R	2R	LQ	LQ	1R	1R	WD	A
Non-ranking tournaments
Champion of Champions	Tournament Not Held									A	A	A	1R	1R	A	A	A	A	A
The Masters	A	A	LQ	LQ	LQ	A	A	A	A	A	A	1R	1R	1R	A	A	A	A	A
Championship League	Not Held			A	RR	RR	RR	A	A	A	RR	RR	RR	WD	A	2R	RR	SF	A
Six-red World Championship (Note: The event was called the Six-red Snooker International (2008/2009) and the Six-red World Grand Prix (2009/2010))	Tournament Not Held				A	A	A	NH	A	A	2R	F	QF	QF	A	A	Not Held		A
Former ranking tournaments
Northern Ireland Trophy	NH	NR	LQ	1R	3R	Tournament Not Held													
Bahrain Championship	Tournament Not Held				LQ	Tournament Not Held													
Wuxi Classic (Note: The event was called the Jiangsu Classic (2008/2009–2009/2010))	Tournament Not Held				Non-Ranking Event				LQ	2R	3R	Tournament Not Held							
Australian Goldfields Open	Tournament Not Held							2R	1R	A	1R	A	Tournament Not Held						
Shanghai Masters	Not Held			LQ	1R	F	1R	1R	LQ	LQ	WR	1R	1R	3R	Non-Ranking		Not Held		
Paul Hunter Classic (Note: The event was called the Grand Prix Fürth (2004/2005) and the Fürth German Open (2005/2006–2006/2007))	Pro-am Event						Minor-Ranking Event						3R	A	A	NR	Not Held		
Indian Open	Tournament Not Held									3R	1R	NH	A	A	1R	Tournament Not Held			
China Open	1R	LQ	LQ	LQ	LQ	LQ	LQ	LQ	1R	LQ	1R	LQ	1R	1R	3R	Tournament Not Held			
Riga Masters (Note: The event was called the Riga Open (2014/2015–2015/2016))	Tournament Not Held										Minor-Rank		A	A	2R	A	Not Held		
International Championship	Tournament Not Held								LQ	QF	LQ	2R	3R	3R	1R	3R	Not Held		
China Championship	Tournament Not Held												NR	LQ	3R	LQ	Not Held		
World Open (Note: The event was called the Grand Prix (2004/2005–2009/2010))	A	LQ	RR	LQ	1R	1R	LQ	LQ	LQ	3R	Not Held		2R	1R	LQ	2R	Not Held		
Turkish Masters	Tournament Not Held																	2R	NH
Gibraltar Open	Tournament Not Held											MR	1R	3R	A	QF	2R	1R	NH
Former non-ranking tournaments
Huangshan Cup	Not Held			QF	Tournament Not Held														
Masters Qualifying Event	NH	A	QF	QF	2R	A	Tournament Not Held												
Beijing International Challenge	Tournament Not Held					W	SF	Tournament Not Held											
Wuxi Classic	Tournament Not Held				RR	A	1R	1R	Ranking Event			Tournament Not Held							
World Grand Prix	Tournament Not Held										2R	Ranking Event							
General Cup (Note: The event was called the General Cup International (2004/2005–2011/2012))	A	Tournament Not Held				F	NH	A	RR	A	RR	A	Tournament Not Held						
Shoot Out	Tournament Not Held						WD	3R	1R	A	A	1R	Ranking Event						
China Championship	Tournament Not Held												1R	Ranking Event			Not Held		
Romanian Masters	Tournament Not Held													QF	Tournament Not Held				
Shanghai Masters	Not Held			Ranking Event											1R	2R	Not Held		
Haining Open	Tournament Not Held										Minor-Rank		A	A	2R	A	NH	A	NH

== Career finals ==
=== Ranking finals: 3 (1 title) ===
Legend
UK Championship (0–1)
Other (1–1)

Outcome	No.	Year	Championship	Opponent in the final	Score	Ref
Runner-up	1.	2009	Shanghai Masters	(England) Ronnie O'Sullivan	5–10	
Runner-up	2.	2015	UK Championship	(Australia) Neil Robertson	5–10	
Winner	1.	2016	English Open	(England) Judd Trump	9–6	

=== Minor-ranking finals: 3 (1 title) ===
Outcome	No.	Year	Championship	Opponent in the final	Score	Ref
Runner-up	1.	2010	Rhein–Main Masters	(Scotland) Marcus Campbell	0–4	
Winner	1.	2013	Zhengzhou Open	(China) Lyu Haotian	4–0	
Runner-up	2.	2014	Dongguan Open	(England) Stuart Bingham	1–4	

=== Non-ranking finals: 5 (1 title) ===
Outcome	No.	Year	Championship	Opponent in the final	Score	Ref
Winner	1.	2009	Beijing International Challenge	(Scotland) Stephen Maguire	7–6	
Runner-up	1.	2009	General Cup	(England) Ricky Walden	2–6	
Runner-up	2.	2011	HK Spring Trophy	(China) Cao Yupeng	5–6	
Runner-up	3.	2013	World Games	(India) Aditya Mehta	0–3	
Runner-up	4.	2015	Six-red World Championship	(Thailand) Thepchaiya Un-Nooh	2–8	

=== Pro-am finals: 2 ===
Outcome	No.	Year	Championship	Opponent in the final	Score	Ref
Runner-up	1.	2006	Asian Games	(China) Ding Junhui	2–4	
Runner-up	2.	2009	Asian Indoor Games	(China) Xiao Guodong	2–5	

=== Team finals: 4 (2 titles) ===
Outcome	No.	Year	Championship	Team	Opponent in the final	Score	Ref
Winner	1.	2011	World Cup	China	Northern Ireland	4–2	
Winner	2.	2017	World Cup (2)	China A	England	4–3	
Runner-up	1.	2017	CVB Snooker Challenge	China	Great Britain	9–26	
Runner-up	2.	2019	World Cup	China B	Scotland	0–4	

=== Amateur finals: 1 (1 title) ===
Outcome	No.	Year	Championship	Opponent in the final	Score	Ref
Winner	1.	2005	IBSF World Under-21 Championship	(China) Tian Pengfei	11–9	
