= 2009 General Cup International =

General Cup
Tournament information
- Dates: 13–17 July 2009
- Venue: General Snooker Club
- Country: Hong Kong
- Format: Non-ranking event
- Winner's share: $20,000
- Highest break: 116

Final
- Champion: (England) Ricky Walden
- Runner-up: (China) Liang Wenbo
- Score: 6–2

The 2009 General Cup was an invitational professional snooker tournament that took place between 13 and 17 July 2009 at the General Snooker Club in Hong Kong.

Ricky Walden won in the final 6–2 against Liang Wenbo.

== Prize fund ==
The breakdown of prize money for this year is shown below:

- Winner: $20,000
- Runner-up: $10,000
- Semi-final: $7,500
- Players 5–7: $5,000
- Highest break: $5,000
- Maximum break: $100,000

== Group stage ==
=== Group 1 ===
POS	Player	MP	MW	FW	FL	FD	PTS
1	(China) Liang Wenbo	2	2	8	3	+5	2
2	(England) Ricky Walden	2	1	5	7	−2	1
3	(Hong Kong) Chan Wai Kei	2	0	5	8	−3	0

- Liang Wenbo 4–2 Chan Wai Kei
- Ricky Walden 4–3 Chan Wai Kei
- Ricky Walden 1–4 Liang Wenbo

=== Group 2 ===
POS	Player	MP	MW	FW	FL	FD	PTS
1	(China) Tian Pengfei	2	1	6	5	+1	1
2	(China) Li Yan	2	1	6	6	0	1
3	(Hong Kong) Marco Fu	2	1	5	6	−1	1

- Marco Fu 4–2 Li Yan
- Tian Pengfei 2–4 Li Yan
- Marco Fu 1–4 Tian Pengfei

Preliminary round

- Zhang Anda 2–4 Li Yan

== Knock-out stage ==
Semi-finals; Best of 9 frames
(China) Liang Wenbo	5
(China) Li Yan	2
(China) Tian Pengfei	1
(England) Ricky Walden	5

Final; Best of 11 frames
(China) Liang Wenbo	2
(England) Ricky Walden	6

== Final ==
Final: Best of 11 frames. General Cup International, Hong Kong, 17 July 2009.
Liang Wenbo; China	2–6	Ricky Walden; England
7–62 (56), 39–56, 70–8, 61–66 (Walden 58), 117–1 (116), 6–68, 34–67 (52), 0–68 (62)
116	Highest break	62
1	Century breaks	0
1	50+ breaks	4

== Century breaks ==
- 116, 104 – Liang Wenbo
- 111, 104 – Ricky Walden
- 105, 100 – Li Yan
