= 2014 General Cup =

General Cup

Tournament information
- Dates: 12–18 October 2014
- Venue: General Snooker Club
- Country: Hong Kong
- Format: Non-ranking event
- Winner's share: $120,000
- Highest break: (England) Shaun Murphy (144)

Final
- Champion: (England) Ali Carter
- Runner-up: (England) Shaun Murphy
- Score: 7–6

The 2014 General Cup was a professional non-ranking snooker tournament that took place between 12 and 18 October 2014 at the General Snooker Club in Hong Kong.

Barry Hawkins was to take part in the tournament, but he was replaced by Liang Wenbo due to a neck injury.

The General Cup marked the return of Ali Carter, who was playing in his first event since his chemotherapy treatment, having been diagnosed with testicular cancer that had spread to his lungs in May. Carter intended to take part in the Bulgarian Open, but he was forced to withdraw.

Mark Davis was the defending champion, but he lost 2–6 against Ali Carter in the semi-final.

Carter won his sixth professional title by defeating Shaun Murphy 7–6 in the final.

== Prize fund ==
The breakdown of prize money for this year is shown below:

- Winner: $120,000
- Runner-up: $60,000
- Semi-final: $40,000
- Third in group: $25,000
- Fourth in group: $20,000
- Wildcard round: $20,000
- Per century break: $2,000
- Highest break: $20,000
- Maximum break: $367,000 (Note: The maximum break prize money contained $147,000 and a diamond encrusted cue worth approximately $220,000.)

== Wildcard round ==
The wildcard match was played on 12 October, was the best of 11 frames and decided the fourth player in group B.

Player 1	Score	Player 2
Liang Wenbo (CHN)	6–4	Lin Yongzhi (CHN)

== Round robin stage ==
The top two players from both groups qualified for the knock-out stage. All group matches were held between 13 and 16 October and were the best of 7 frames.

=== Group A ===
POS	Player	MP	MW	FW	FL	FD	PTS
1	(England) Mark Davis	3	2	11	5	+6	2
2	(England) Joe Perry	3	2	8	7	+1	2
3	(England) Jimmy White	3	1	9	11	−2	1
4	(England) Ricky Walden	3	1	5	10	−5	1

- Joe Perry 0–4 Mark Davis
- Ricky Walden 4–2 Jimmy White
- Mark Davis 3–4 Jimmy White
- Joe Perry 4–0 Ricky Walden
- Ricky Walden 1–4 Mark Davis
- Joe Perry 4–3 Jimmy White

=== Group B ===
POS	Player	MP	MW	FW	FL	FD	PTS
1	(England) Shaun Murphy	3	3	12	4	+8	3
2	(England) Ali Carter	3	2	9	7	+2	2
3	(China) Liang Wenbo	3	1	7	11	−4	1
4	(Hong Kong) Marco Fu	3	0	6	12	−6	0

- Shaun Murphy 4–1 Liang Wenbo
- Marco Fu 1–4 Ali Carter
- Shaun Murphy 4–1 Ali Carter
- Marco Fu 3–4 Liang Wenbo
- Ali Carter 4–2 Liang Wenbo
- Shaun Murphy 4–2 Marco Fu

== Knock-out stage ==
Semi-finals (Best of 11 frames); 17 October
(England) Mark Davis	2
(England) Ali Carter	6
(England) Shaun Murphy	6
(England) Joe Perry	5

Final (Best of 13 frames); 18 October
(England) Ali Carter	7
(England) Shaun Murphy	6

Final: Best of 13 frames. Referee: Anthony Lau. General Snooker Club, Hong Kong, 18 October 2014.
Ali Carter; England	7–6	Shaun Murphy; England
70–15, 81–61 (68, 61), 42–65, 28–62 (59), 115–0 (112), 0–90 (90), 6–66, 46–68, 75–14 (69), 99–0 (99), 29–59 (54), 101–25 (101), 77–26
112	Highest break	90
2	Century breaks	0
5	50+ breaks	4

== Century breaks ==
- 144, 101 – Shaun Murphy
- 139, 112, 105, 101 – Ali Carter
- 136, 115, 104 – Joe Perry
- 120, 107 – Liang Wenbo
- 110, 104 – Mark Davis
- 108 – Jimmy White
