= 2008 Shanghai Masters =

Roewe Shanghai Masters
Tournament information
- Dates: 29 September – 5 October 2008
- Venue: Shanghai Grand Stage
- City: Shanghai
- Country: China
- Organisation: WPBSA
- Format: Ranking event
- Total prize fund: £282,000
- Winner's share: £52,000
- Highest break: Jamie Cope (ENG) (147)

Final
- Champion: Ricky Walden (ENG)
- Runner-up: Ronnie O'Sullivan (ENG)
- Score: 10–8

The 2008 Roewe Shanghai Masters was a professional ranking snooker tournament that took place between 29 September and 5 October 2008 at the Shanghai Grand Stage in Shanghai, China. The second edition of the tournament since its inaugural staging the previous year, it was the second ranking event of the 2008/2009 season.

Former World Champion Graeme Dott withdrew from the competition after breaking his left arm on 30 September, during an informal football match with other snooker players. As a result, Jamie Cope, who was due to play Dott in the first round, received a bye to the last 16, where he made the 64th official maximum break against Mark Williams.

Qualifier Ricky Walden won in the final 10–8 against World Champion Ronnie O'Sullivan to win his first ranking title.

== Prize fund ==
The breakdown of prize money for this year is shown below:

- Winner: £52,000
- Runner-up: £25,000
- Semi-final: £12,500
- Quarter-final: £6,725
- Last 16: £5,000
- Last 32: £3,450
- Last 48: £2,050
- Last 64: £1,400
- Stage one highest break: £500
- Stage two highest break: £2,000
- Stage one maximum break: £1,000
- Stage two maximum break: £20,000
- Total: £282,000

== Wildcard round ==
These matches were played in Shanghai on 29 September.

Match		Score	
WC1	Ricky Walden (ENG)	5–0	Zhang Anda (CHN)
WC2	Judd Trump (ENG)	5–4	Ah Bulajiang (CHN)
WC3	Jimmy White (ENG)	5–2	Xiao Guodong (CHN)
WC4	Anthony Hamilton (ENG)	5–1	Li Yan (CHN)
WC5	Andy Hicks (ENG)	5–1	Li Yuan (CHN)
WC6	Tom Ford (ENG)	5–4	Yu Delu (CHN)
WC7	Stuart Pettman (ENG)	5–1	Cao Xinlong (CHN)

== Main draw ==
Last 32; Best of 9 frames
1	(Wales) Dominic Dale	4
(England) Steve Davis	5
12	(China) Ding Junhui	3
(England) Dave Harold	5
11	(Australia) Neil Robertson	5
(Republic of Ireland) Fergal O'Brien	2
7	(Scotland) Stephen Hendry	4
(England) Ricky Walden	5
5	(England) Mark Selby	5
(England) Judd Trump	1
16	(England) Mark King	5
(England) Jimmy White	4
15	(Hong Kong) Marco Fu	5
(England) Anthony Hamilton	2
4	(England) Shaun Murphy	1
(England) Andy Hicks	5
3	(Scotland) Stephen Maguire	5
(England) Barry Hawkins	3
10	(England) Peter Ebdon	3
(England) Stuart Bingham	5
9	(Wales) Ryan Day	5
(China) Liang Wenbo	0
6	(Scotland) John Higgins	5
(England) Tom Ford	4
8	(England) Ali Carter	2
(Wales) Mark Williams	5
14	(Scotland) Graeme Dott	w/d
(England) Jamie Cope	w/o
13	(England) Joe Perry	5
(Wales) Matthew Stevens	1
2	(England) Ronnie O'Sullivan	5
(England) Stuart Pettman	2

Last 16; Best of 9 frames
(England) Steve Davis	5
(England) Dave Harold	4
11	(Australia) Neil Robertson	4
(England) Ricky Walden	5
5	(England) Mark Selby	5
16	(England) Mark King	0
15	(Hong Kong) Marco Fu	5
(England) Andy Hicks	2
3	(Scotland) Stephen Maguire	5
(England) Stuart Bingham	3
9	(Wales) Ryan Day	5
6	(Scotland) John Higgins	2
(Wales) Mark Williams	5
(England) Jamie Cope	2
13	(England) Joe Perry	3
2	(England) Ronnie O'Sullivan	5

Quarter-finals; Best of 9 frames
(England) Steve Davis	2
(England) Ricky Walden	5
5	(England) Mark Selby	5
15	(Hong Kong) Marco Fu	3
3	(Scotland) Stephen Maguire	5
9	(Wales) Ryan Day	4
(Wales) Mark Williams	3
2	(England) Ronnie O'Sullivan	5

Semi-finals; Best of 11 frames
(England) Ricky Walden	6
5	(England) Mark Selby	4
3	(Scotland) Stephen Maguire	5
2	(England) Ronnie O'Sullivan	6

Final; Best of 19 frames
(England) Ricky Walden	10
2	(England) Ronnie O'Sullivan	8

== Final ==
Final: Best of 19 frames. Referee: Terry Camilleri; Shanghai Grand Stage, Shanghai, China, 5 October 2008.
Ricky Walden; England	10–8	Ronnie O'Sullivan (2); England
Afternoon: 0–88, 61–47, 113–20 (74), 99–4 (94), 22–86 (58), 0–95 (64), 1–87 (87), 77–38 (56), 0–78 (78); Evening: 104–0 (95), 5–122 (108), 78–21, 65–25, 16–82 (82), 73–23 (59), 84–4, 30–66, 105–11 (105)
105	Highest break	108
1	Century breaks	1
6	50+ breaks	6

== Qualifying rounds ==
These matches took place from 2 to 5 September 2008 at Pontins in Prestatyn, Wales.

Round 1 Best of 9 frames

== Century breaks ==
=== Qualifying stage centuries ===
- 130 – Lee Spick
- 121 – James McBain
- 116 – Jin Long
- 112 – Matthew Selt
- 110 – Paul Davison
- 107 – Liu Song
- 105 – Andy Hicks
- 101 – Andrew Norman

=== Televised stage centuries ===
- 147 – Jamie Cope
- 145, 141, 108, 106, 100 – Ronnie O'Sullivan
- 139, 105, 104, 101 – Ricky Walden
- 139 – Ian Preece
- 137 – Fergal O'Brien
- 136, 134 – John Higgins
- 135 – Judd Trump
- 128 – Mark Williams
- 127, 104 – Andy Hicks
- 127 – Atthasit Mahitthi
- 125, 107, 106 – Tom Ford
- 120, 116, 115, 114 – Stuart Pettman
- 119 – Nigel Bond
- 114, 101 – Stephen Maguire
- 114 – Jamie Burnett
- 114 – Peter Ebdon
- 108 – Gerard Greene
- 106, 105 – Joe Perry
- 105 – Liang Wenbo
- 105 – Mark Selby
- 103 – Stuart Bingham
- 103 – Barry Hawkins
- 102 – Jimmy White
