= 2009 Beijing International Challenge =

Beijing International Challenge
Tournament information
- Dates: 7–12 July 2009
- Venue: Beijing University Students' Gymnasium
- City: Beijing
- Country: China
- Organisation: 110 Sports Management Group
- Format: Non-ranking event
- Winner's share: £50,000
- Highest break: 138

Final
- Champion: (China) Liang Wenbo
- Runner-up: (Scotland) Stephen Maguire
- Score: 7–6

The 2009 Beijing International Challenge (also known as the 2009 BTV Cup) was a professional non-ranking snooker tournament that took place between 7–12 July 2009 at the Beijing University Students' Gymnasium in Beijing, China.

Liang Wenbo won his first professional title by beating Stephen Maguire 7–6.

== Prize fund ==
The breakdown of prize money for this year is shown below:

- Winner: £50,000
- Runner-up: £25,000
- Semi-final: £7,500
- Highest break: £2,500

== Round-robin stage ==
=== Group 1 ===
Table

POS	Player	MP	MW	FW	FL	FD	PTS
1	(China) Liang Wenbo	3	2	7	3	+4	2
2	(Scotland) Stephen Hendry	3	2	6	6	0	2
3	(England) Ali Carter	3	1	5	6	−1	1
4	(China) Jin Long	3	1	4	7	−3	1

Results:

- Jin Long 0–3 Ali Carter
- Stephen Hendry 0–3 Liang Wenbo
- Liang Wenbo 3–0 Ali Carter
- Stephen Hendry 3–2 Ali Carter
- Jin Long 3–1 Liang Wenbo
- Jin Long 1–3 Stephen Hendry

=== Group 2 ===
Table

POS	Player	MP	MW	FW	FL	FD	PTS
1	(Scotland) Stephen Maguire	3	3	9	1	+8	3
2	(Northern Ireland) Mark Allen	3	1	6	8	−2	1
3	(Hong Kong) Marco Fu	3	1	5	7	−2	1
4	(China) Tian Pengfei	3	1	4	8	−4	1

Results:

- Marco Fu 0–3 Stephen Maguire
- Stephen Maguire 3–1 Mark Allen
- Marco Fu 3–1 Tian Pengfei
- Tian Pengfei 3–2 Mark Allen
- Tian Pengfei 0–3 Stephen Maguire
- Marco Fu 2–3 Mark Allen

== Knock-out stage ==
Semi-finals; Best of 9 frames
(China) Liang Wenbo	5
(Northern Ireland) Mark Allen	1
(Scotland) Stephen Maguire	5
(Scotland) Stephen Hendry	3

Final; Best of 13 frames
(China) Liang Wenbo	7
(Scotland) Stephen Maguire	6

== Century breaks ==
- 138, 123 – Liang Wenbo
- 103 – Stephen Maguire
