= 2011 UK Championship =

Snooker tournament

2011 williamhill.com UK Championship

Tournament information
- Dates: 3–11 December 2011
- Venue: Barbican Centre
- City: York
- Country: England
- Organisation: World Snooker
- Format: Ranking event
- Total prize fund: £625,000
- Winner's share: £100,000
- Highest break: Stephen Maguire (SCO) (144)

Final
- Champion: Judd Trump (ENG)
- Runner-up: Mark Allen (NIR)
- Score: 10–8

The 2011 UK Championship (officially the 2011 williamhill.com UK Championship) was a professional ranking snooker tournament that took place between 3–11 December 2011 at the Barbican Centre in York, England. This was the first time that William Hill sponsored the event.

John Higgins was the defending champion, but he lost in the second round 4–6 against Stephen Maguire.

Judd Trump won his second ranking title by defeating Mark Allen 10–8 in the final.

== Prize fund ==
The breakdown of prize money for this year is shown below:

- Winner: £100,000
- Runner-up: £46,000
- Semi-final: £23,250
- Quarter-final: £16,450
- Last 16: £12,050
- Last 32: £8,750
- Last 48: £5,500
- Last 64: £2,300
- Stage one highest break: £5,000
- Stage two highest break: £500
- Total: £625,000

== Controversy ==
The format of the 2011 UK Championship was changed from previous editions. All rounds up to the quarter-finals were played as best of 11 frames instead of best of 17 frames. The semi-finals and the final were played as best of 17 and best of 19 frames respectively. The changes allowed for every match in the early rounds to be played in front of television cameras and avoided the need to use two extra tables. However, the changes angered some players including John Higgins, and Mark Williams, while Mark Allen called for Barry Hearn to resign as head of World Snooker, after Hearn had promised not to alter the championship when he had become the chairman in 2010. During the same interview Allen aimed a four lettered expletive at Hearn. Allen was later charged by World Snooker for bringing the game into disrepute. Hearn, following the original comments by Allen, called him a "silly little boy", to which Allen responded by gagging himself at a press conference. Allen and Hearn later sat down and had a discussion, which resolved their differences, while Allen was fined £250 for swearing in a press conference.

== Main draw ==
Last 32; Best of 11 frames
1	John Higgins (SCO)	6
Rory McLeod (ENG)	5
9	Stephen Maguire (SCO)	6
Stephen Hendry (SCO)	3
14	Ronnie O'Sullivan (ENG)	6
Steve Davis (ENG)	1
8	Judd Trump (ENG)	6
Dominic Dale (WAL)	4
5	Ding Junhui (CHN)	6
Mark Davis (ENG)	5
15	Matthew Stevens (WAL)	6
Marcus Campbell (SCO)	2
10	Graeme Dott (SCO)	6
Matthew Selt (ENG)	1
4	Neil Robertson (AUS)	6
Tom Ford (ENG)	1
3	Mark Williams (WAL)	6
Joe Jogia (ENG)	4
13	Stephen Lee (ENG)	3
Ricky Walden (ENG)	6
16	Martin Gould (ENG)	6
Peter Lines (ENG)	2
6	Shaun Murphy (ENG)	6
Li Yan (CHN)	3
7	Ali Carter (ENG)	6
Robert Milkins (ENG)	4
12	Mark Allen (NIR)	6
Adrian Gunnell (ENG)	3
11	Stuart Bingham (ENG)	4
Marco Fu (HKG)	6
2	Mark Selby (ENG)	6
Ryan Day (WAL)	0

Last 16; Best of 11 frames
1	(Scotland) John Higgins	4
9	(Scotland) Stephen Maguire	6
14	(England) Ronnie O'Sullivan	5
8	(England) Judd Trump	6
5	(China) Ding Junhui	6
15	(Wales) Matthew Stevens	5
10	(Scotland) Graeme Dott	3
4	(Australia) Neil Robertson	6
3	(Wales) Mark Williams	3
(England) Ricky Walden	6
16	(England) Martin Gould	4
6	(England) Shaun Murphy	6
7	(England) Ali Carter	2
12	(Northern Ireland) Mark Allen	6
(Hong Kong) Marco Fu	6
2	(England) Mark Selby	3

Quarter-finals; Best of 11 frames
9	(Scotland) Stephen Maguire	3
8	(England) Judd Trump	6
5	(China) Ding Junhui	2
4	(Australia) Neil Robertson	6
(England) Ricky Walden	6
6	(England) Shaun Murphy	3
12	(Northern Ireland) Mark Allen	6
(Hong Kong) Marco Fu	5

Semi-finals; Best of 17 frames
8	(England) Judd Trump	9
4	(Australia) Neil Robertson	7
(England) Ricky Walden	7
12	(Northern Ireland) Mark Allen	9

Final; Best of 19 frames
8	(England) Judd Trump	10
12	(Northern Ireland) Mark Allen	8

== Final ==
Final: Best of 19 frames. Referee: Eirian Williams. Barbican Centre, York, England, 11 December 2011.
Judd Trump (8); England	10–8	Mark Allen (12); Northern Ireland
Afternoon: 92–4 (70), 23–58 (56), 0–149 (141), 48–69, 86–49 (52), 62–30, 75–33 (75), 73–31 (61); Evening: 109–7 (109), 78–46 (78), 82–14 (74), 0–139 (139), 0–133 (129), 76–1 (76), 8–125 (125), 35–75, 32–95 (95), 91–0 (91)
109	Highest break	141
1	Century breaks	4
9	50+ breaks	6

== Qualifying ==
These matches were held between 5 and 9 November 2011 at the South West Snooker Academy, Gloucester, England.

Preliminary round

Best of 11 frames

Daniel Wells (WAL)	6–0	Kacper Filipiak (POL)
Lucky Vatnani (IND)	4–6	Robin Hull (FIN)

Round 1–4

Round 1 Best of 11 frames
Adam Duffy (ENG)	6
Dechawat Poomjaeng (THA)	3
Kurt Maflin (NOR)	6
David Hogan (IRL)	4
Ian McCulloch (ENG)	6
Luca Brecel (BEL)	5
Bjorn Haneveer (BEL)	4
Tian Pengfei (CHN)	6
Michael White (WAL)	6
Daniel Wells (WAL)	4
Andrew Pagett (WAL)	5
Sam Craigie (ENG)	6
Matthew Couch (ENG)	2
Cao Yupeng (CHN)	6
Paul Davison (ENG)	2
Adam Wicheard (ENG)	6
Liam Highfield (ENG)	3
Sam Baird (ENG)	6
Passakorn Suwannawat (THA)	6
Joe Meara (NIR)	0
Yu Delu (CHN)	1
Robin Hull (FIN)	6
Li Yan (CHN)	6
Stuart Carrington (ENG)	4
David Gilbert (ENG)	6
Aditya Mehta (IND)	5
David Morris (IRL)	3
David Grace (ENG)	6
Rod Lawler (ENG)	6
Simon Bedford (ENG)	2
Andrew Norman (ENG)	6
Scott MacKenzie (SCO)	5

Round 2 Best of 11 frames
Alfie Burden (ENG)	3
(England) Adam Duffy	6
Jimmy Robertson (ENG)	6
(Norway) Kurt Maflin	5
James Wattana (THA)	5
(England) Ian McCulloch	6
Liu Chuang (CHN)	0
(China) Tian Pengfei	6
Barry Pinches (ENG)	4
(Wales) Michael White	6
Ben Woollaston (ENG)	6
(England) Sam Craigie	5
Liu Song (CHN)	3
(China) Cao Yupeng	6
Xiao Guodong (CHN)	6
(England) Adam Wicheard	5
Anthony McGill (SCO)	6
(England) Sam Baird	2
Jimmy White (ENG)	6
(Thailand) Passakorn Suwannawat	2
Peter Lines (ENG)	6
(Finland) Robin Hull	4
Andy Hicks (ENG)	5
(China) Li Yan	6
Joe Swail (NIR)	1
(England) David Gilbert	6
Adrian Gunnell (ENG)	6
(England) David Grace	4
Mark Joyce (ENG)	6
(England) Rod Lawler	5
Tony Drago (MLT)	6
(England) Andrew Norman	3

Round 3 Best of 11 frames
Rory McLeod (ENG)	6
(England) Adam Duffy	4
Gerard Greene (NIR)	6
(England) Jimmy Robertson	2
Steve Davis (ENG)	6
(England) Ian McCulloch	2
Nigel Bond (ENG)	6
(China) Tian Pengfei	4
Liang Wenbo (CHN)	2
(Wales) Michael White	6
Michael Holt (ENG)	3
(England) Ben Woollaston	6
Matthew Selt (ENG)	6
(China) Cao Yupeng	3
Mike Dunn (ENG)	0
(China) Xiao Guodong	6
Joe Jogia (ENG)	6
(Scotland) Anthony McGill	5
Jamie Jones (WAL)	6
(England) Jimmy White	5
Alan McManus (SCO)	4
(England) Peter Lines	6
Jack Lisowski (ENG)	2
(China) Li Yan	6
Robert Milkins (ENG)	6
(England) David Gilbert	5
Dave Harold (ENG)	3
(England) Adrian Gunnell	6
Anthony Hamilton (ENG)	6
(England) Mark Joyce	4
Jamie Burnett (SCO)	6
(Malta) Tony Drago	3

Round 4 Best of 11 frames
Barry Hawkins (ENG)	2
(England) Rory McLeod	6
Stephen Hendry (SCO)	6
(Northern Ireland) Gerard Greene	2
Andrew Higginson (ENG)	2
(England) Steve Davis	6
Dominic Dale (WAL)	6
(England) Nigel Bond	2
Mark Davis (ENG)	6
(Wales) Michael White	2
Marcus Campbell (SCO)	6
(England) Ben Woollaston	3
Mark King (ENG)	4
(England) Matthew Selt	6
Tom Ford (ENG)	6
(China) Xiao Guodong	0
Jamie Cope (ENG)	3
(England) Joe Jogia	6
Ricky Walden (ENG)	6
(Wales) Jamie Jones	2
Ken Doherty (IRL)	5
(England) Peter Lines	6
Fergal O'Brien (IRL)	2
(China) Li Yan	6
Peter Ebdon (ENG)	3
(England) Robert Milkins	6
Joe Perry (ENG)	4
(England) Adrian Gunnell	6
Marco Fu (HKG)	6
(England) Anthony Hamilton	5
Ryan Day (WAL)	6
(Scotland) Jamie Burnett	0

== Century breaks ==
=== Televised stage centuries ===
- 144, 134, 122 – Stephen Maguire
- 141, 139, 129, 125, 101 – Mark Allen
- 140, 136 – Matthew Stevens
- 133, 123, 101 – Martin Gould
- 133, 103 – Ding Junhui
- 131 – Marco Fu
- 128 – Stuart Bingham
- 127, 124 – Ricky Walden
- 123, 114 – Ronnie O'Sullivan
- 120, 109, 106, 106 – Judd Trump
- 118 – Dominic Dale
- 117 – Graeme Dott
- 111, 102 – Mark Selby
- 105, 101 – Neil Robertson
- 103 – Stephen Lee
- 102 – Matthew Selt
- 102 – Shaun Murphy
- 101 – Marcus Campbell
- 101 – John Higgins

=== Qualifying stage centuries ===
- 139 – David Hogan
- 134, 100 – Sam Baird
- 130 – Jamie Jones
- 127 – Ian McCulloch
- 127 – Ryan Day
- 126 – Robin Hull
- 124 – Mark Joyce
- 123 – Fergal O'Brien
- 122 – Mark Davis
- 121 – Li Yan
- 118 – Ben Woollaston
- 117 – Adam Wicheard
- 117 – David Grace
- 111 – Lucky Vatnani
- 110 – Rory McLeod
- 110 – Robert Milkins
- 109 – Daniel Wells
- 109 – Jamie Cope
- 109 – Peter Lines
- 108 – Anthony McGill
- 108 – Ricky Walden
- 106 – Luca Brecel
- 106 – Jimmy Robertson
- 104 – Gerard Greene
- 103 – Aditya Mehta
- 103 – Jimmy White
- 102 – Sam Craigie
- 102 – David Gilbert
- 100 – Tian Pengfei
