= General Cup =

Defunct snooker tournament, held sporadically from 2004–2015

Tournament information
- Venue: General Snooker Club
- Country: Hong Kong
- Established: 2004
- Organisation(s): General Snooker Club
- Format: Non-ranking event
- Final year: 2015
- Final champion: (Hong Kong) Marco Fu

The General Cup was a professional non-ranking snooker tournament which was held sporadically from 2004 until 2015 at the General Snooker Club in Hong Kong.

== History ==
Established in 2004 under the "General Cup International" name, the tournament was contested only intermittently, with the last event held in 2015. The field comprised mostly professional players and several top Far Eastern amateurs, except in 2013 only professionals were invited.

In 2014, there were eight professionals and a wildcard player. In the early rounds, the field of competition is divided into groups with the players in each group playing each other in a round-robin format, followed by knock-out stages. The final champion is Marco Fu.

== Winners ==
| Year | Winner | Runner-up | Final score | Season |
|---|---|---|---|---|
| 2004 | (Thailand) Issara Kachaiwong | (Wales) Dominic Dale | 6–3 | 2004/05 |
| 2009 | (England) Ricky Walden | (China) Liang Wenbo | 6–2 | 2009/10 |
| 2011 | (England) Stephen Lee | (England) Ricky Walden | 7–6 | 2011/12 |
| 2012 | (Australia) Neil Robertson | (England) Ricky Walden | 7–6 | 2012/13 |
| 2013 | (England) Mark Davis | (Australia) Neil Robertson | 7–2 | 2013/14 |
| 2014 | (England) Ali Carter | (England) Shaun Murphy | 7–6 | 2014/15 |
| 2015 | (Hong Kong) Marco Fu | (Wales) Mark Williams | 7–3 | 2015/16 |
