= Khurram Hussain Agha =

Pakistani snooker player (born 1976)

Khurram Hussain Agha (born 18 October 1976) is an international Pakistani amateur snooker player. A former Asia number three, he was ranked number one in the Pakistan Snooker Rankings for more than half of the decade 2000–2010.

== Achievements ==
- 2001 Pakistan national champion
- 2002 Pakistan National Championship runner-up
- 2002 Pakistan Latif Masters runner-up
- 2003 Pakistan Latif Masters champion
- 2004 Pakistan national champion
- 2006 Pakistan national champion
- 2006 Pakistan Latif Masters runner-up
