= York Barbican =

Entertainment venue in York, England

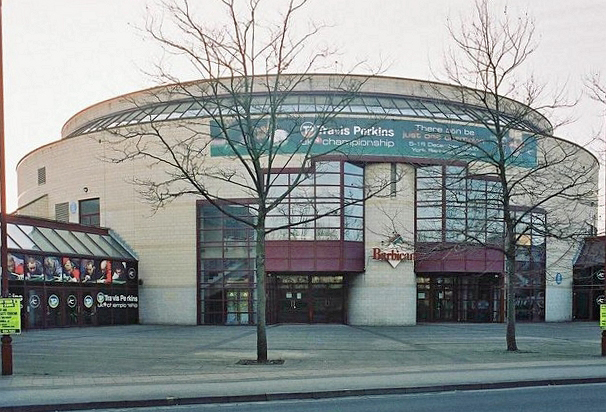
- York Barbican
- Interactive map of York Barbican
- Location: York, England
- Coordinates: 53°57′12.42″N 1°4′27.27″W
- Owner: City of York Council
- Operator: ASM Global
- Capacity: 1,900 standing; 1,500 seated

Construction
- Opened: 1991
- Renovated: 2011

Website
- http://www.yorkbarbican.co.uk

York Barbican is an indoor entertainment venue located in York, England. Named after the nearby barbican attached to Walmgate Bar, the venue hosts a busy calendar of live music, comedy and sports, as well as business events and conferences. It has a 1,500 seating capacity and a 1,900 standing capacity.

York Barbican is the host venue for the second biggest-ranking snooker tournament, the UK Championship, and has done so from 2001 to 2006, and then from 2011 onwards.

The centre is located on the southern end of York city centre, opposite the city walls.

== History ==
The current facility was built in 1989 at a price of £15 million by York Council, adding to a swimming pool, which had been previously constructed on the site in 1980. The 1989 construction added a sports hall and auditorium, with a climbing wall facility, café and bars. Despite offering the largest concert facility and a wide range of classes and local events (such as the annual York Interschool Battle of the Bands), York Barbican consistently made losses while it was operated by the council, and in 2000, both the swimming pool and new facilities were placed on the market in a bid to pass them on to private management.

By 2003, a single bidder had emerged as the preferred company to develop the site. Proposals to build new swimming facilities were part of the plans. However, a local group of residents, 'Save Our Barbican' (S.O.B.) spearheaded local opposition to the proposals circulated in the public consultation. Later planned developments suggested apartments on the site, or a casino and nightclub facility. By the end of 2004, with no plans accepted and a legal case going forward by the resident group, York Barbican was officially closed and lay empty for years to come - only the UK Championship snooker tournament continued to use the venue in both 2005 and 2006. The swimming pool building was demolished, and the 1989 building began to show signs of weathering and vandalism and closed down.

In spring 2011, it finally reopened after a £1.5 million refurbishment, owned by the council but managed by ASM Global, an international venue operator. As of 2025, York Barbican has been operated by Legends Global Services Ltd.

On 19 June 2021, a local group of squatters moved into the demolished swimming pool and reclaimed it as "Barbican Community Centre". They claim they are stopping the land - which has been empty for 15 years - from being developed into expensive student accommodation.

== Notable events ==
The Liberal Democrats regularly hold the Liberal Democrat Conference at the venue.

The venue is the current host of the UK Snooker Championship.

In 2019, the venue hosted the Conservative Party Hustings, between Jeremy Hunt and Boris Johnson.
