= 1990 in sports =

1990 in sports describes the year's events in world sport.

== Alpine skiing ==
- Alpine Skiing World Cup
  - Men's overall season champion: Pirmin Zurbriggen, Switzerland

== American football ==
- Super Bowl XXIV – the San Francisco 49ers (NFC) won 55–10 over the Denver Broncos (AFC)
  - Location: Superdome
  - Attendance: 72,919
  - MVP: Joe Montana, QB (San Francisco)
- Sugar Bowl (1989 season):
  - The Miami Hurricanes won 33–25 over the Alabama Crimson Tide to win the national championship
- November 11 – Derrick Thomas has 7 sacks for Kansas City Chiefs against Seattle Seahawks.

== Association football ==
- West Germany won the 1990 FIFA World Cup in Rome, Italy, defeating defending champion Argentina 1–0 in the final.
- Ecuador – Ecuadorian Serie A Champions: Liga Deportiva Universitaria de Quito

== Athletics ==
- 1990 Commonwealth Games held in Auckland, New Zealand
- 1990 European Athletics Championships held in Split, SR Croatia, Yugoslavia

== Australian rules football ==
- Australian Football League
  - The Victorian Football League is renamed the Australian Football League
  - Collingwood wins the 94th AFL premiership (Collingwood 13.11 (89) to Essendon 5.11 (41))
  - Brownlow Medal awarded to Tony Liberatore (Footscray)

== Baseball ==
- March 17 – Taiwan Professional Baseball League, a first official game held.
- June 11 – Nolan Ryan of the Texas Rangers pitched a no-hitter, his 6th, against the Oakland Athletics.
- The Cincinnati Reds sweep the Oakland A's in the World Series.
- Ira Smith becomes the first player in NCAA history to win consecutive batting titles after hitting .519 with the Maryland Eastern Shore Hawks.

== Basketball ==
NBA Finals

- Detroit Pistons win four games to one over the Portland Trail Blazers

National Basketball League (Australia) Finals

- Perth Wildcats defeated the Brisbane Bullets 2–1 in the best-of-three final series.

Events

- UNLV wins the NCAA Division I Men's championship
- Yugoslavia wins the FIBA World Championship.
- March 4 – American player Hank Gathers died after collapsing during the semifinals of a West Coast Conference tournament game.

== Boxing ==
- February 11 – Buster Douglas defeated Mike Tyson by a knockout in round 10 to win the world's unified Heavyweight title, in what many consider boxing's biggest upset ever.
- March 17 – Thunder Meets Lightning: Julio César Chávez defeated Meldrick Taylor to unify boxing's world junior welterweight title
- September 22 to October 7 – Asian Games held in Beijing, China
- November 24 to December 3 – Central American and Caribbean Games held in Mexico City

== Canadian football ==
- Grey Cup – Winnipeg Blue Bombers 50–11 over the Edmonton Eskimos
- Vanier Cup – Saskatchewan Huskies win 24–21 over the St. Mary's Huskies

== Cycling ==
- Giro d'Italia won by Gianni Bugno of Italy
- Tour de France – Greg LeMond of the United States
- UCI Road World Championships – Men's road race – Rudy Dhaenens of Belgium

== Dogsled racing ==
- Iditarod Trail Sled Dog Race champion –
  - Susan Butcher won with lead dogs: Sluggo & Lightning

== Darts ==
- Phil Taylor (darts player) wins his first world title

== Field hockey ==
- Men's Champions Trophy held in Melbourne won by Australia
- Women's World Cup held in Sydney won by the Netherlands

== Figure skating ==
- World Figure Skating Championships –
  - Men's champion: Kurt Browning, Canada
  - Ladies' champion: Jill Trenary, United States
  - Pair skating champions: Ekaterina Gordeeva & Sergei Grinkov, Soviet Union
  - Ice dancing champions: Marina Klimova / Sergei Ponomarenko, Soviet Union

== Gaelic Athletic Association ==
- Camogie
  - All-Ireland Camogie champion: Kilkenny
  - National Camogie League: Kilkenny
- Gaelic football
  - All-Ireland Senior Football Championship – Cork 0-11 died Meath 0-9
  - National Football League – Meath 2-7 died Down 0-11
- Ladies' Gaelic football
  - All-Ireland Senior Football Champion: Kerry
  - National Football League: Kerry
- Hurling
  - All-Ireland Senior Hurling Championship – Cork 5-15 died Galway 2-21
  - National Hurling League – Kilkenny 0–19 beat New York 0–9

== Golf ==
Men's professional

- Masters tournament – Nick Faldo
- U.S. Open – Hale Irwin
- British Open – Nick Faldo
- PGA Championship – Wayne Grady
- PGA Tour money leader – Greg Norman – $1,165,477
- Senior PGA Tour money leader – Lee Trevino – $1,190,518

Men's amateur

- British Amateur – Rolf Muntz
- U.S. Amateur – Phil Mickelson
- European Amateur – Klas Erikson

Women's professional

- Nabisco Dinah Shore – Betsy King
- U.S. Women's Open – Betsy King
- LPGA Championship – Beth Daniel
- Classique du Maurier – Cathy Johnston-Forbes
- LPGA Tour money leader – Beth Daniel – $863,578
- The inaugural Solheim Cup match was won by the United States who beat Europe 11½ – 4½

== Harness racing ==
- North America Cup – Apaches Fame
- United States Pacing Triple Crown races –
  1. Cane Pace – Jake And Elwood
  2. Little Brown Jug – Beach Towel
  3. Messenger Stakes – Jake And Elwood
- United States Trotting Triple Crown races –
  1. Hambletonian – Harmonious
  2. Yonkers Trot - Royal Troubador
  3. Kentucky Futurity – Star Mystic
- Australian Inter Dominion Harness Racing Championship –
  - Pacers: Thorate
  - Trotters: Real Force

== Horse racing ==
Steeplechases

- Cheltenham Gold Cup – Norton's Coin
- Grand National – Mr Frisk

Flat races

- Australia – Melbourne Cup won by Kingston Rule
- Canadian Triple Crown Races:
  1. Queen's Plate – Izvestia
  2. Prince of Wales Stakes – Izvestia
  3. Breeders' Stakes – Izvestia
  - For the second straight year, a horse sweeps the series.
- France – Prix de l'Arc de Triomphe won by Saumarez
- Ireland – Irish Derby Stakes won by Salsabil
- Japan – Japan Cup won by Better Loosen Up
- English Triple Crown Races:
  1. 2,000 Guineas Stakes – Tirol
  2. The Derby – Quest for Fame
  3. St. Leger Stakes – Snurge
- United States Triple Crown Races:
  1. Kentucky Derby – Unbridled
  2. Preakness Stakes – Summer Squall
  3. Belmont Stakes – Go and Go
- Breeders' Cup World Thoroughbred Championships:
  1. Breeders' Cup Classic – Unbridled
  2. Breeders' Cup Distaff – Bayakoa
  3. Breeders' Cup Juvenile – Fly So Free
  4. Breeders' Cup Juvenile Fillies – Meadow Star
  5. Breeders' Cup Mile – Royal Academy
  6. Breeders' Cup Sprint – Safely Kept
  7. Breeders' Cup Turf – In the Wings

== Ice hockey ==
- Art Ross Trophy as the NHL's leading scorer during the regular season: Wayne Gretzky, Los Angeles Kings
- Hart Memorial Trophy for the NHL's Most Valuable Player: Mark Messier, Edmonton Oilers
- Stanley Cup – Edmonton Oilers won 4 games to 1 over the Boston Bruins
- World Hockey Championships
  - Men's champion: Soviet Union defeated Sweden
  - Junior Men's champion: Canada defeated Soviet Union
  - Women's champion: in the inaugural event, Canada defeated United States

== Lacrosse ==
- The 6th World Lacrosse Championship is held in Perth, Australia. The United States win, and Canada is the runner-up.
- The Philadelphia Wings beat the New England Blazers 17–7 in the Major Indoor Lacrosse League Championship.
- The Brooklin Redmen win the Mann Cup.
- Orangeville wins the Founders Cup.
- The St. Catharines Athletics win the Minto Cup.

== Radiosport ==
- The first World Radiosport Team Championship held in Seattle, United States Gold medals won by John Dorr K1AR and Doug Grant K1DG of the United States.
- Fifth Amateur Radio Direction Finding World Championship held in Štrbské Pleso, Czechoslovakia (now Slovakia).

== Rugby league ==
- 1990–91 French Championship season
- 1990 Kangaroo tour of Great Britain and France
- 1990 New Zealand rugby league season
- 1990 NSWRL season
- 1990 Pacific Cup
- 1989–90 Rugby Football League season / 1990–91 Rugby Football League season
- 1990 State of Origin series
- 1989–1992 Rugby League World Cup

== Rugby union ==
- 96th Five Nations Championship series is won by Scotland who complete the Grand Slam

== Snooker ==
- World Snooker Championship – Stephen Hendry beats Jimmy White 18–12 to win his first world title
- World rankings – Stephen Hendry becomes world number one for 1990/91

== Swimming ==
- March 24 – Tom Jager betters his own world record (22.12) in the 50m freestyle (long course) twice at a swimming meet in Nashville, Tennessee, swimming 21.98 in the heats and 21.81 in the final.

== Tennis ==
- Grand Slam in tennis men's results:
  1. Australian Open – Ivan Lendl
  2. French Open – Andrés Gómez
  3. Wimbledon championships – Stefan Edberg
  4. US Open – Pete Sampras
- Grand Slam in tennis women's results:
  1. Australian Open – Steffi Graf
  2. French Open – Monica Seles
  3. Wimbledon championships – Martina Navratilova
  4. U.S. Open – Gabriela Sabatini
- Davis Cup – United States won 3–2 over Australia in world tennis.

== Triathlon ==
- ITU World Championships held in Orlando, United States
- ETU European Championships held in Linz, Austria

== Volleyball ==
- FIVB World League 1990 held in Osaka, Japan won by Italy
- 1990 FIVB Men's World Championship held in Rio de Janeiro won by Italy
- 1990 FIVB Women's World Championship held in Beijing won by USSR

== Multi-sport events ==
- Asian Games held in Beijing, China
- Winter Asian Games held in Sapporo, Japan
- Central American and Caribbean Games held in Mexico City, Mexico
- 1990 Commonwealth Games held in Auckland, New Zealand
- Summer Goodwill Games held in Seattle, United States

== Awards ==
- Associated Press Male Athlete of the Year – Joe Montana, National Football League
- Associated Press Female Athlete of the Year – Beth Daniel, LPGA golf
- BBC Overseas Sports Personality of the Year – Mal Meninga, Australian rugby league footballer
- Sports Illustrated Sportsman of the Year - Joe Montana, National Football League
