= 2011 Masters (snooker) =

Professional non-ranking snooker tournament, Jan 2011

2011 Ladbrokes Mobile Masters

Tournament information
- Dates: 9–16 January 2011
- Venue: Wembley Arena
- City: London
- Country: England
- Organisation: World Snooker
- Format: Non-ranking event
- Total prize fund: £500,000
- Winner's share: £150,000
- Highest break: Stephen Maguire (SCO) (142)

Final
- Champion: Ding Junhui (CHN)
- Runner-up: Marco Fu (HKG)
- Score: 10–4

The 2011 Masters (officially the 2011 Ladbrokes Mobile Masters) was a professional non-ranking snooker tournament that took place from 9 to 16 January 2011 at the Wembley Arena in London, England. The second Triple Crown event of the 2010–11 snooker season, following the 2010 UK Championship and preceding the 2011 World Championship, the tournament was the 37th edition of the Masters, which had been held annually since 1975. The winner received £150,000 from a total prize fund of £500,000.

The top 16 players in the snooker world rankings were invited to the event. Jamie Cope made his Masters debut at the event and reached the semi-finals. Mark Selby was the defending champion, having defeated Ronnie O'Sullivan in the deciding frame of the 2010 final. He lost to Mark King 4–6 in the first round.

For the first time, two Asian players contested the final of a professional snooker tournament. Ding Junhui defeated Marco Fu 10–4 to claim his first Masters title. The tournament produced 16 century breaks, of which the highest was a 142 by Stephen Maguire in his first-round match against Fu.

== Overview ==
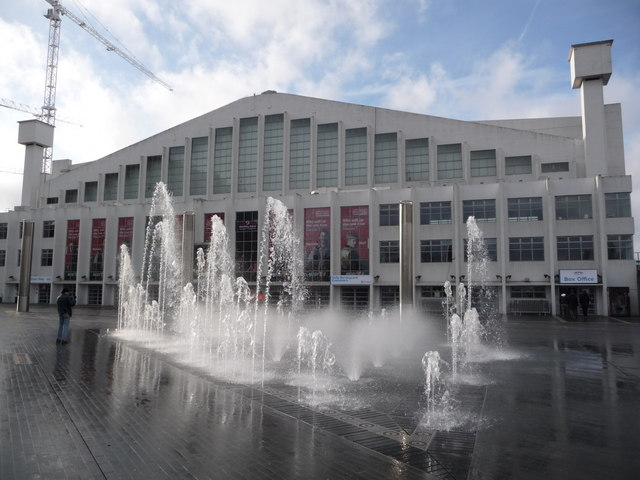
The tournament was held at the Wembley Arena, pictured from outside during the event.

The Masters was first held in 1975 for 10 invited players at the West Centre Hotel in London. John Spencer won the inaugural event, defeating Ray Reardon on a re-spotted black in the deciding frame of the final. The second-oldest professional snooker tournament, after the World Championship, the Masters had been staged at the Wembley Arena since the 2007 edition. As of 2011, Stephen Hendry was the most successful player in the tournament's history, having won the title six times, including five years in a row from 1989 to 1993.

The 2011 edition of the tournament—the 37th consecutive staging since its inaugural edition in 1975—took place from 9 to 16 January at the Wembley Arena in London, England. Organised by World Snooker and sponsored for the first time by gambling company Ladbrokes Mobile, it was the second Triple Crown event of the 2010–11 season, following the 2010 UK Championship and preceding the 2011 World Championship. Mark Selby was the defending champion, having defeated Ronnie O'Sullivan 10–9 in the 2010 final.

=== Format and participants ===
Unlike previous tournaments since the 1991 edition, (Note: With the exception of the 2005 edition, when there was no qualifying event.) there was no qualifying event and the use of wild cards was also discontinued. Sixteen players were invited to the event. Selby, as the defending champion, was seeded first, while the world number one when the seedings were set, Neil Robertson, was second. The remaining seeds were also awarded according to the world rankings, specifically as per the first revision of the 2010–11 rankings, which was also used for the UK Championship. Jamie Cope made his Masters debut.

=== Prize fund ===
The winner received £150,000 from a total prize fund of £500,000. The breakdown of prize money for the event is shown below:

- Winner: £150,000
- Runner-up: £75,000
- Semi-finals: £30,000
- Quarter-finals: £20,000
- Last 16: £15,000
- Highest break: £15,000
- Total: £500,000

== Summary ==
=== First round ===
The first-round matches were played from 9 to 12 January as the best of 11 frames. The defending champion Mark Selby made a 70 break and then doubled his lead over Mark King in the second frame. King replied with a 139 break, and he also won frames four and five to take the lead for the first time. He then extended his lead by taking the next frame, in which both players produced half-centuries. Selby made a 106 break as he took the following two frames to tie the scores. King produced breaks of 79, 50, and 77 as he won back-to-back frames for a 6–4 victory. It was Selby's second defeat in the last twelve matches he had played at the Masters. "Mark [Selby] is a fantastic player and this is like his backyard, but he won the second frame and put his cue up and it gave me the hump a bit," King said. He attributed the result to his having worked on improving his break-building.

Peter Ebdon made two half-centuries as he won the first two frames against Ali Carter. Carter took the third. Ebdon produced an 88 break in the next, but Carter replied with breaks of 83 and 56 to equalise. The next two frames were shared. Ebdon took the ninth frame to go within one of victory. In the next, leading 5–4, he held a 64-point lead, but Carter stole it. Ebdon won the deciding frame to seal victory in a match that lasted more than four hours. Ding Junhui made an 89 break to take the opening frame against Mark Williams, who replied by winning the second. Ding produced breaks of 52 and 61 as he took three frames in a row. Williams won the next to reduce the deficit to two at 2–4. Breaks of 56 and 69 gave Ding the next frame, before Williams won two in succession. Ding sealed victory in frame 10 with a 75 break which included a pot on the last green ball along the cushion using the rest. "The green was a good shot, but I fancied [Ding] to get it. I suppose I did give myself too much to do but I've played [a] lot worse than that and won," Williams said.

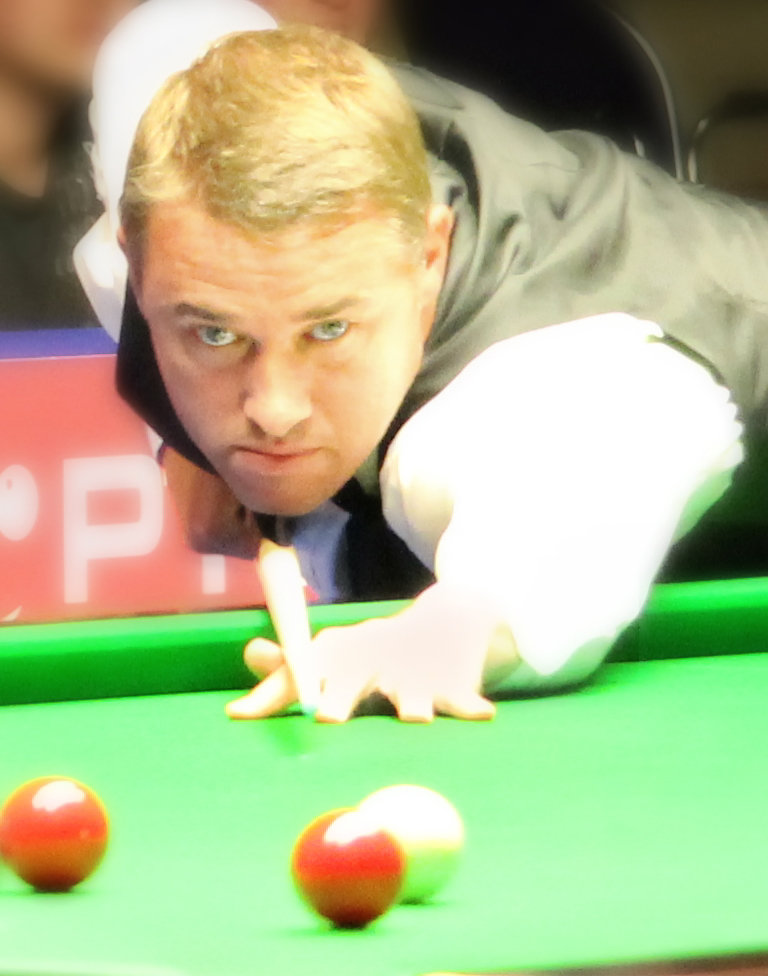
The six-time Masters champion Stephen Hendry (pictured in 2011) lost his first-round match against Neil Robertson. Afterwards, he said that he was "off to join the other has-beens in the commentary box".

John Higgins, the world number one, faced Graeme Dott, whom he had defeated at the 2010 UK Championship the previous month. Dott made a century break and won the second frame with a 65 break to build a 2–0 lead. Higgins took the third aided by a 68 break, but a visit of 79 restored Dott's two-frame advantage. Higgins won the next two frames with breaks of 55 and 73 to tie at 3–3. Dott secured the next frame by potting the frame-ball yellow when he was trying to play it safe. Higgins tied again with a 70 break, but Dott won the ninth frame after Higgins missed a brown ball and also secured the tenth for victory. "I'm just overawed with the size of the arena and it makes me edgy," Higgins said. Four-time champion Ronnie O'Sullivan had only lost twice in the first round of the tournament, having progressed to the quarter-finals on fifteen occasions. He faced Mark Allen, who won the opening frame. O'Sullivan produced an 86 break to tie in the second, but Allen won the next two frames, featuring an 88 break. The following two frames were shared. From 2–4 behind, O'Sullivan drew level again, but Allen constructed an 87 break as he took frames 9 and 10 for victory. "There wasn't any quality so much as bottle, I've shown that over the last few years," said Allen, who praised O'Sullivan's long potting. "He wasn't at his best but I'm happy to win," Allen added. The first two frames between Marco Fu and Stephen Maguire were shared. Fu took frame three, made back-to-back centuries in frames four and five, and also took the sixth for a 5–1 lead. Maguire recovered, making breaks of 53, 74, and 142 to reduce the deficit to one, but Fu secured a 6–4 victory in the next. Maguire's 142 was the highest break of the tournament, earning him a £15,000 bonus.

Neil Robertson, winner of the 2010 World Championship, faced the six-time Masters champion Stephen Hendry. Hendry took the first frame with a 74 break and also led 2–1 thanks to a 64, but Robertson compiled breaks of 85 and 86 to take the advantage. He also won the following two frames, featuring a break of 81, to go 5–2. Hendry won frame eight, but Robertson took the next to progress. "It took a bit of time to get used to the table but towards the end I made some good breaks," Robertson said. After the defeat, Hendry said that he was "off to join the other has-beens in the commentary box". Debutant Jamie Cope took the first frame against Shaun Murphy with a 77 break. The players then exchanged frames as Cope held his lead at 4–3. Cope then won two in a row for victory. Murphy's highest break was a 50. Clive Everton reporting for The Guardian, wrote that the match was "generally slow and littered with mistakes".

=== Quarter-finals ===
The quarter-finals were played on 13 and 14 January as the best of 11 frames. Facing Dott, Ding made back-to-back century breaks in the first two frames. Dott took the third frame, but Ding added another century in the next to go 3–1 ahead. Dott narrowed the deficit by taking frame five. In the next frame, he held a 38-point lead, but lost position on the reds, as he ended up touching ball. Ding came back to the table and won the frame with a 74 break. He also took the next and produced a half-century in frame eight to secure a 6–2 victory. Dott's highest break in the match was 38.

Cope took the opening frame after King failed to lay a snooker on the final blue ball. He doubled his lead with a 66-point clearance in the second frame and produced two more half-centuries as he took frames three and four. King replied with a 102 break. In the next frame, he fouled by accidentally potting the black when playing a red, and Cope went 5–1 up. Cope secured victory in the next frame, coming from a 40-point deficit.

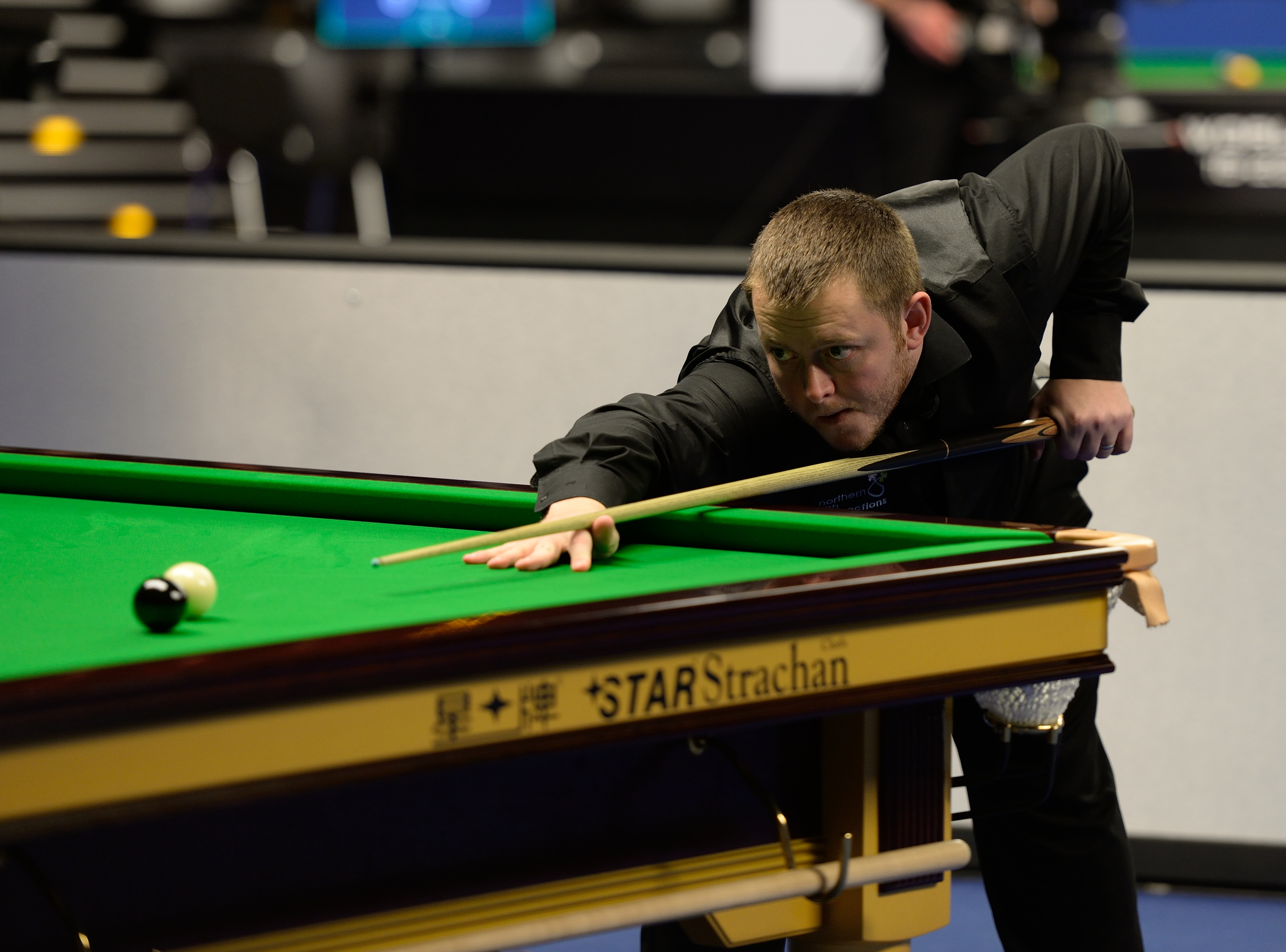
Mark Allen (pictured in 2015) defeated Ronnie O'Sullivan and Neil Robertson, but was eliminated by Marco Fu in the semi-finals.

Allen compiled breaks of 63 and 69 as he took the first two frames. Robertson replied with three half-centuries in the next three to recover and go ahead for the first time. Allen tied the scores in the next, before Robertson took the lead once again, aided by a 75 break. From 3–4 behind, Allen produced breaks of 57, 75, and 69 as he won three consecutive frames for victory. "It was really close and credit to Mark [Allen]. He stuck in there and didn't miss an awful lot of any significance." Robertson said. Allen commented that "[I'm] sure that sooner or later I'll win one. You're never sure how you're going to deal with something until you've experienced it but if I can beat Ronnie [O'Sullivan] and Neil [Robertson] there's no need to be worried. I've got no one to fear but I've still got to perform".

Facing Ebdon, Fu produced a 91 break to win the opening frame. Ebdon led in the second, but he missed a red while playing it with the rest and Fu doubled his lead by potting the final black ball. Fu made further breaks of 80, 107, and 57 as he completed a whitewash. "I expected a really long and tough match because Peter [Ebdon] usually scores well and his safety is good. I was surprised he missed so many balls, but he hasn't been well so maybe that was a factor. It was nice to win easily," Fu said.

=== Semi-finals ===
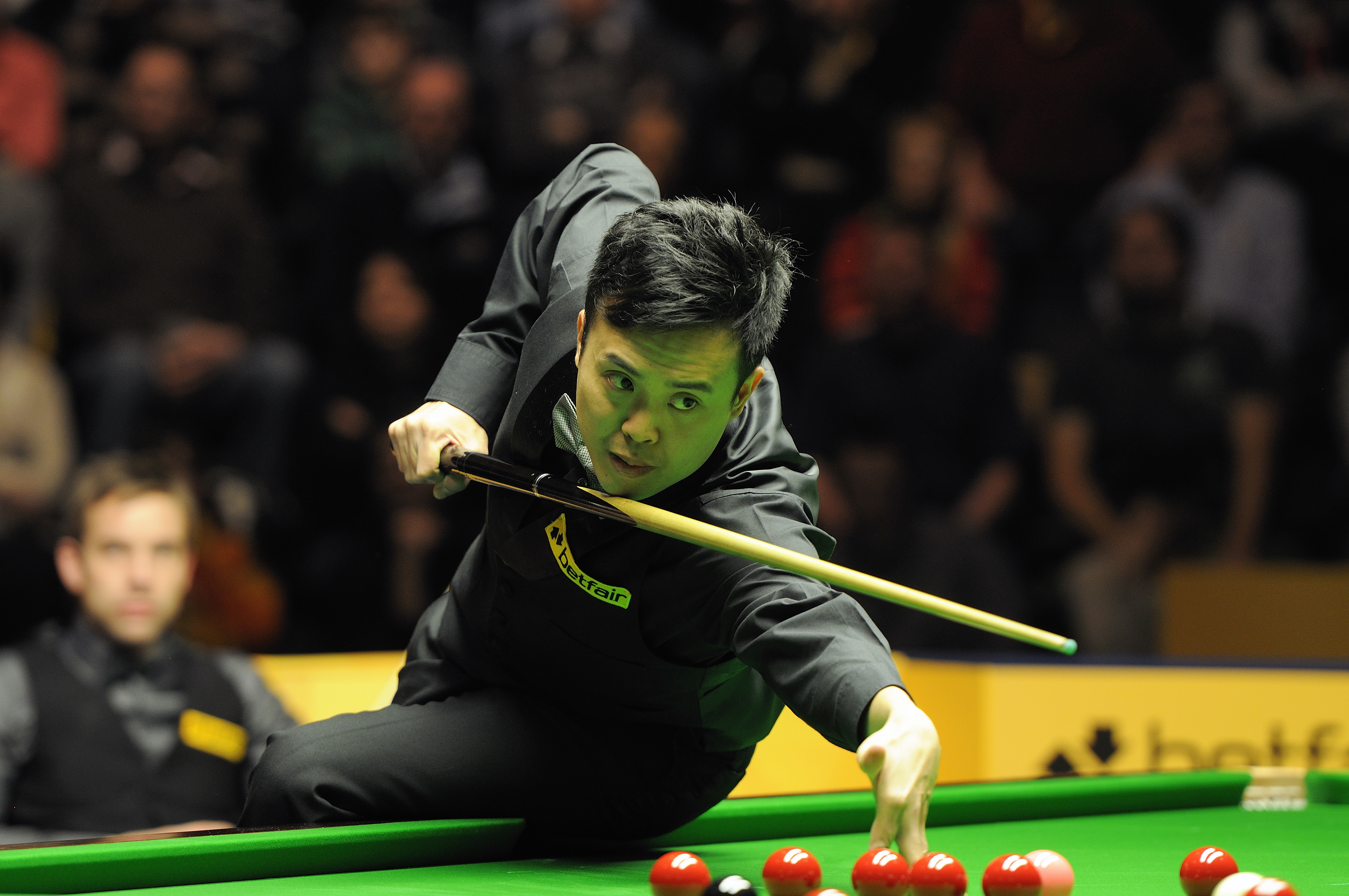
Marco Fu (pictured in 2013) eliminated Stephen Maguire, Peter Ebdon, and Mark Allen to reach the final, where he lost to Ding Junhui.

The semi-finals were played on 15 January as the best of 11 frames. In the first semi-final, Allen, facing Fu, produced a 70 break to win the first frame. Fu replied with an 82. Allen then won three in a row, featuring a 66 break, before Fu won five consecutive frames for a 6–4 victory, compiling breaks of 130, 97, and 136. Fu said that reaching the final of the Masters was "bigger" than his 2007 Grand Prix trophy. "I grew up watching the Masters on TV and it really means a lot to me. This and the World [Championship] are the two biggest tournaments. To win it would be very special," he said. "I don't want to be consistent in getting to semi-finals, I want to be a consistent winner." Allen said.

Meeting Cope in the second semi-final, Ding took the opening frame with a 68 break, but Cope replied with a century in the second. Ding then produced breaks of 54 and 102 as he took frames three and four to lead 3–1 going into the mid-session interval. In frame five, Ding compiled a 65 break to come from 59 points behind. Cope won the next to trail 2–4, but Ding extended his lead with a break of 60. Cope added another frame with a 73 break, but Ding produced contributions of 69 and 58 in frame nine to secure a 6–3 victory. "I just missed a couple of balls I should have potted early on. I couldn't afford to do that because [Ding] was amazing. He didn't look like missing and he will be hard to stop in the final. It's a decent result for me to get to the semis," Cope said.

=== Final ===
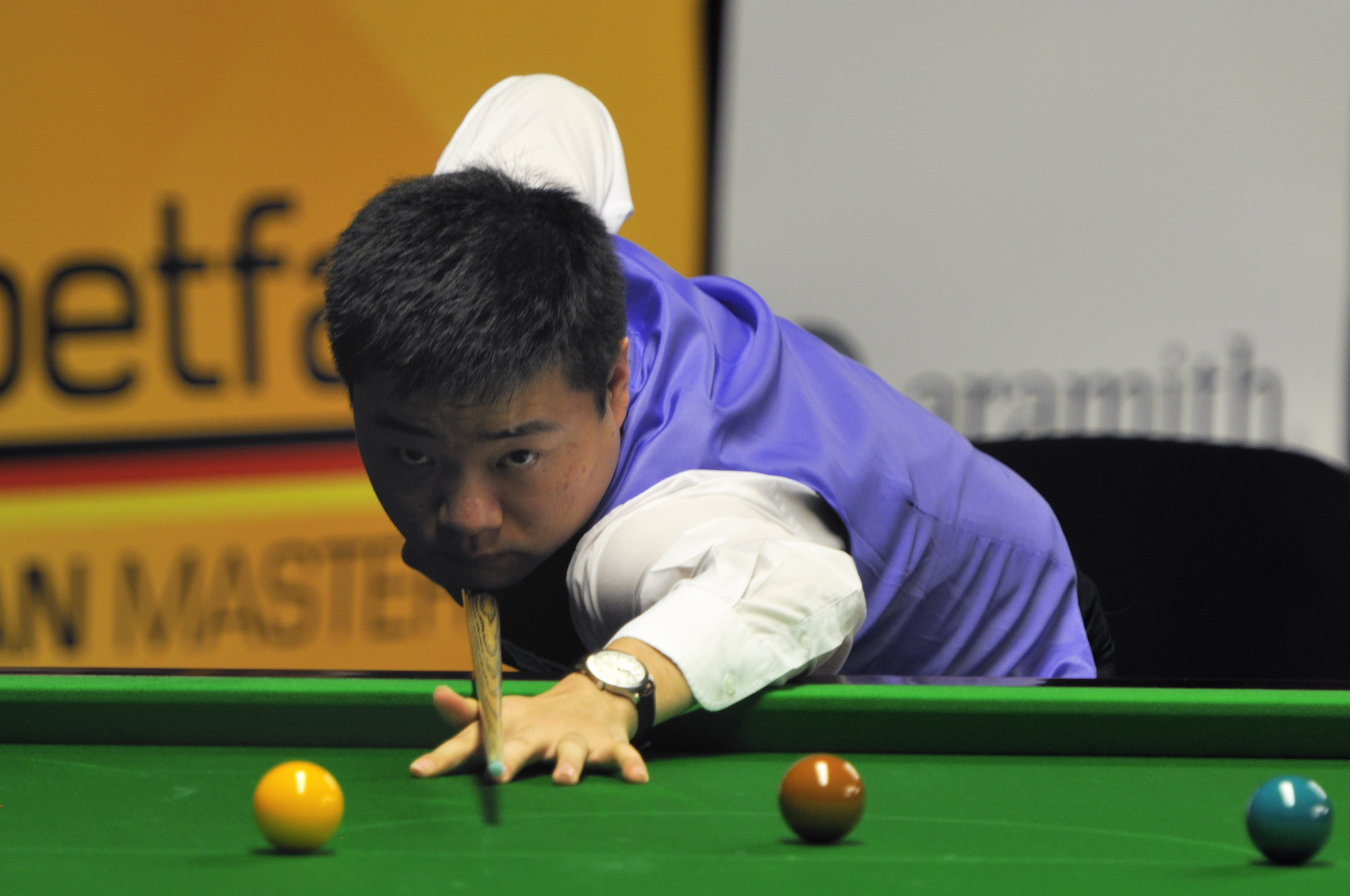
Ding Junhui (pictured in 2013) defeated Marco Fu 10–4 to claim his first Masters title. For the first time, two Asian players contested the final of a professional snooker tournament.

The best-of-19-frame final was played on 16 January, between Ding and Fu, over two sessions. For the first time, two Asian players contested the final of a professional snooker tournament. Ding was competing in the final of the Masters for the second time, having lost to O'Sullivan at the 2007 edition. Referee Eirian Williams officiated the match.

Ding made breaks of 120 and 74 as he took the first two frames. Fu replied in the third with an 80 break, but Ding restored his two-frame lead with a 61 break in the fourth and extended it by also winning the next. Fu produced an 82 break in frame six, but Ding secured the last two of the first session with breaks of 60 and 66 to lead 6–2. In the second session, Fu won two consecutive frames, featuring breaks of 69 and 56, to halve the deficit. In the next frame, Fu took the advantage and laid a snooker on the final yellow. He then cleared up to the blue and played safe on the pink. Ding, requiring a snooker, trapped the cue ball behind the black, got the penalty points he needed, and potted the two remaining balls to lead 7–4. He then produced breaks of 94, 83, and 85 to win the following three frames in succession and claim a 10–4 victory.

Ding collected £150,000 in prize money. "When he got to 6–4 [Fu] was playing well, and I had lost my cue action. I was lucky to go 7–4 ahead, that made a big difference. It was the most important frame, it changed everything. I was more confident after that," Ding said. Fu received £75,000 as runner-up. "I didn't feel good in the first session. The game was too tough for me and the damage was done," he said. "I started to play well this evening and won two frames quickly. In the 11th frame I should have tried to pot the pink. I played safe and messed it up, then he played a superb shot to snooker me." An estimated audience of 100 million viewers in China was expected to watch the final session of the match.

== Tournament draw ==
The draw of the tournament is shown below. Numbers in parentheses after the players' names denote the players' seedings, and players in bold denote match winners.

**First round** Best of 11 frames
Mark Selby (ENG) (1)	4
**Mark King (ENG) (15)**	**6**
Shaun Murphy (ENG) (8)	3
**Jamie Cope (ENG) (14)**	**6**
Mark Williams (WAL) (5)	4
**Ding Junhui (CHN) (9)**	**6**
John Higgins (SCO) (4)	4
**Graeme Dott (SCO) (11)**	**6**
Ali Carter (ENG) (3)	5
**Peter Ebdon (ENG) (13)**	**6**
Stephen Maguire (SCO) (6)	4
**Marco Fu (HKG) (16)**	**6**
Ronnie O'Sullivan (ENG) (7)	4
**Mark Allen (NIR) (12)**	**6**
**Neil Robertson (AUS) (2)**	**6**
Stephen Hendry (SCO) (10)	3

**Quarter-finals**; Best of 11 frames
Mark King (ENG) (15)	1
**Jamie Cope (ENG) (14)**	**6**
**Ding Junhui (CHN) (9)**	**6**
Graeme Dott (SCO) (11)	2
Peter Ebdon (ENG) (13)	0
**Marco Fu (HKG) (16)**	**6**
**Mark Allen (NIR) (12)**	**6**
Neil Robertson (AUS) (2)	4

**Semi-finals**; Best of 11 frames
Jamie Cope (ENG) (14)	3
**Ding Junhui (CHN) (9)**	**6**
**Marco Fu (HKG) (16)**	**6**
Mark Allen (NIR) (12)	4

**Final**; Best of 19 frames
**Ding Junhui (CHN) (9)**	**10**
Marco Fu (HKG) (16)	4

=== Final: frame scores ===
Final: Best of 19 frames. Referee: Eirian Williams; Wembley Arena, London, England, 16 January 2011
**Ding Junhui** (9); China	**10**–4	Marco Fu (16); Hong Kong
Afternoon: **136**–0 (120), **74**–0 (74), 18–**84** (80), **71**–42 (61), **57**–46, 0–**82** (82), **68**–17 (60), **82**–30 (66); Evening: 1–**73** (69), 5–**94** (56), **77**–74, **95**–5 (94), **83**–12 (83), **86**–6 (85)
**120**	Highest break	82
**1**	Century breaks	0
**8**	50+ breaks	4

== Century breaks ==
A total of 16 century breaks were made during the tournament.

- 142 – Stephen Maguire
- 139, 102 – Mark King
- 136, 130, 117, 109, 107 – Marco Fu
- 124, 124, 120, 108, 102 – Ding Junhui
- 115 – Graeme Dott
- 106 – Mark Selby
- 101 – Jamie Cope
