= 2010–11 snooker world rankings =

Preceded by 2009–10	2010–11	Succeeded by 2011–12

2010–11 snooker world rankings: The professional world rankings for all the professional snooker players who qualified for the 2010‍–‍11 season are listed below. The rankings worked as a two-year rolling list. The points for each tournament two years ago were removed, when the corresponding tournament during the current season has finished. The following table contains the rankings, which were used to determine the seedings for certain tournaments.

Name	Country	Rankings Start of 2010/11 season^{[b]}		Revision 1^{[c]}		Revision 2^{[d]}		Revision 3^{[e]}	
John Higgins^{[a]}	Scotland	1	57820	3	46470	1	54320	1	59320
Mark Williams	Wales	8	37699	4	45000	3	48755	2	55680
Neil Robertson	Australia	2	48405	1	54190	2	52940	3	52340
Mark Selby	England	9	35445	9	38775	6	45645	4	50345
Ding Junhui	China	5	40975	8	43370	4	46480	5	49580
Stephen Maguire	Scotland	6	40495	5	44160	8	43780	6	47780
Shaun Murphy	England	7	38655	7	43845	5	46085	7	46185
Ali Carter	England	4	46620	2	48600	7	45340	8	45440
Graeme Dott	Scotland	13	30890	11	34000	10	37450	9	41250
Ronnie O'Sullivan	England	3	47835	6	43910	9	41480	10	40980
Mark Allen	Northern Ireland	10	35380	12	33935	11	36525	11	38425
Peter Ebdon	England	18	27545	13	33110	12	34880	12	37980
Stephen Hendry	Scotland	11	33785	10	34570	14	33360	13	36460
Jamie Cope	England	17	27983	14	32178	13	33975	14	36000
Ricky Walden	England	20	26055	20	26855	15	31500	15	32950
Marco Fu	Hong Kong	14	29635	16	31480	18	30300	16	32400
Stuart Bingham	England	29	21659	25	25610	17	30350	17	31750
Matthew Stevens	Wales	25	23384	17	29750	22	28940	18	31440
Mark King	England	15	29085	15	31755	16	30605	19	31305
Ryan Day	Wales	12	33410	23	26355	25	28325	20	30925
Stephen Lee	England	23	23604	19	28590	20	29420	21	30820
Mark Davis	England	26	23145	18	29160	19	29980	22	30805
Andrew Higginson	England	32	19740	29	24260	23	28750	23	30275
Judd Trump	England	27	22560	26	25330	26	27750	24	29275
Barry Hawkins	England	21	25245	22	26500	27	27340	25	28740
Martin Gould	England	43	18072	24	25800	21	29240	26	28490
Liang Wenbo	China	16	28065	21	26560	24	28405	27	28405
Gerard Greene	Northern Ireland	28	22008	28	24435	29	25855	28	26680
Ken Doherty	Ireland	30	21354	30	22940	28	26100	29	26675
Joe Perry	England	19	27385	27	25220	32	22890	30	26090
Dominic Dale	Wales	45	17297	42	19838	33	22795	31	24695
Marcus Campbell	Scotland	40	18133	37	21025	31	23780	32	24605
Tom Ford	England	41	18078	35	21350	30	24505	33	24505
Nigel Bond	England	38	18307	36	21068	37	21790	34	24015
Rory McLeod	England	34	19148	40	20300	38	21570	35	22845
Robert Milkins	England	36	19117	33	21930	36	21800	36	22750
Jamie Burnett	Scotland	37	18500	34	21740	40	21390	37	22290
Mike Dunn	England	33	19478	32	22175	35	22160	38	22110
Fergal O'Brien	Ireland	47	16772	38	20728	34	22410	39	21785
Steve Davis	England	22	25205	31	22770	41	21330	40	21530
Anthony Hamilton	England	42	18073	41	19908	39	21550	41	21400
Tony Drago	Malta	54	14970	51	17327	46	19304	42	20873
Michael Holt	England	24	23460	39	20705	42	20145	43	20720
Peter Lines	England	50	15450	49	17915	43	20110	44	20235
Dave Harold	England	31	20248	46	19078	50	18255	45	19905
Matthew Selt	England	51	15295	52	17285	49	18365	46	19765
Mark Joyce	England	58	14178	65	14288	47	19300	47	19750
Alan McManus	Scotland	46	16903	47	18105	48	18450	48	19600
Joe Swail	Northern Ireland	39	18134	43	19785	45	19870	49	19520
Barry Pinches	England	57	14240	44	19658	44	20070	50	19445
Andy Hicks	England	53	15092	50	17545	52	17790	51	18690
Jamie Jones	Wales			68	13957	53	17614	52	18683
Adrian Gunnell	England	44	17370	48	18035	51	17860	53	18635
Rod Lawler	England	49	15845	53	16188	55	17220	54	18620
Anthony McGill	Scotland			61	14817	56	17034	55	18028
Jack Lisowski	England			69	13557	62	15934	56	18003
Jimmy White	England	60	13120	63	14340	57	16985	57	17635
Ian McCulloch	England	48	16159	54	16165	60	16290	58	17515
Alfie Burden	England			57	15677	59	16374	59	17443
Joe Jogia	England	71	11550	64	14307	58	16644	60	17388
Jimmy Robertson	England	63	12390	62	14362	63	15659	61	16978
Stuart Pettman	England	35	19147	45	19100	54	17570	62	16745
Bjorn Haneveer	Belgium	62	12650	56	15762	61	16259	63	16178
Matthew Couch	England	68	11820	58	15400	66	15150	64	16050
Xiao Guodong	China	74	10640	79	12097	68	14834	65	15903
Liam Highfield	England			71	13417	65	15554	66	15798
Patrick Wallace	Northern Ireland	69	11745	70	13535	64	15600	67	15600
Liu Song	China	77	9635	72	13293	71	14320	68	15595
Liu Chuang	China			86	11272	67	15049	69	15543
David Morris	Ireland	59	13647	55	15905	70	14645	70	14970
Michael White	Wales	72	11370	74	12922	69	14659	71	14903
Simon Bedford	England	66	11940	90	10780	82	12640	72	14240
Jimmy Michie	England	56	14505	59	15350	72	14315	73	14190
Igor Figueiredo	Brazil			67	13967	74	13904	74	14148
Ben Woollaston	England	73	10890	80	12067	76	13884	75	14128
James Wattana	Thailand	67	11860	73	13257	73	14194	76	13988
Kyren Wilson	England			77	12147	77	13404	77	13773
Andrew Pagett	Wales			78	12112	75	13889	78	13683
Paul Davison	England			84	11707	80	12844	79	13588
James McBain	Scotland			76	12477	81	12814	80	13058
Thanawat Thirapongpaiboon	Thailand			83	11917	85	12054	81	12923
Joe Delaney	Ireland	61	13017	66	13975	83	12390	82	12590
David Gilbert	England	55	14525	81	12010	78	13085	83	12285
Zhang Anda	China	70	11690	82	11922	84	12259	84	12053
Michael Judge	Ireland	52	15267	60	14843	79	12960	85	11710
Adam Wicheard	England			92	10352	88	11209	86	11578
Justin Astley	England			85	11517	87	11294	87	11088
Issara Kachaiwong	Thailand			96	9792	89	10849	88	10643
Kuldesh Johal	England			89	10797	92	10374	89	10618
Paul Davies	Wales	64	12253	75	12543	86	11945	90	10545
Kurt Maflin	Norway			91	10512	93	10289	91	10533
Dermot McGlinchey	Northern Ireland			88	10957	91	10534	92	10328
Noppon Saengkham	Thailand			93	10237	94	9814	93	10308
Jamie O'Neill	England			94	10152	96	9369	94	10188
Jak Jones	Wales			95	9992	95	9769	95	10013
Patrick Einsle	Germany			87	10982	90	10559	96	9828
Reanne Evans	England			97	9432	97	8289	97	8083

== Notes ==
- ^{a} John Higgins was suspended from all tournaments until 2 November 2010.
- ^{b} Rankings used from the end of the 2009–10 season were used for the seeding of the Shanghai Masters and World Open.
- ^{c} Revision 1 was used for the seeding of the UK Championship, the Masters and the Snooker Shoot-Out.
- ^{d} Revision 2 was used for the seeding of the German Masters and the Welsh Open.
- ^{e} Revision 3 was used for the seeding of the China Open and the World Championship.
