= 2011 Shanghai Masters =

Bank of Communication Shanghai Masters

Tournament information
- Dates: 5–11 September 2011
- Venue: Shanghai Grand Stage
- City: Shanghai
- Country: China
- Organisation: World Snooker
- Format: Ranking event
- Total prize fund: £350,000
- Winner's share: £65,000
- Highest break: Shaun Murphy (ENG) (143)

Final
- Champion: Mark Selby (ENG)
- Runner-up: Mark Williams (WAL)
- Score: 10–9

The 2011 Bank of Communication Shanghai Masters was a professional ranking snooker tournament that took place between 5–11 September 2011 at the Shanghai Grand Stage in Shanghai, China. It was the fifth edition of the tournament since it was first held in 2007. This was the first time that the Bank of Communications sponsored the event.

Ali Carter was the defending champion, but lost in the first round 4–5 against Mark King.

Mark Selby won his second ranking title by defeating Mark Williams 10–9 in the final. By doing so, he became world number one for the first time in his career.

== Prize fund ==
The breakdown of prize money for this year is shown below:

- Winner: £65,000
- Runner-up: £32,000
- Semi-final: £15,000
- Quarter-final: £10,000
- Last 16: £7,000
- Last 32: £4,000
- Last 48: £2,300
- Last 64: £1,500
- Stage one highest break: £200
- Stage two highest break: £2,000
- Total: £350,000

== Wildcard round ==
These matches were played in Shanghai on 5 September 2011.

Match		Score	
WC1	Fergal O'Brien (IRL)	5–1	Hossein Vafaei (IRI)
WC2	James Wattana (THA)	5–1	Jin Long (CHN)
WC3	Anthony Hamilton (ENG)	5–0	Li Hang (CHN)
WC4	Dominic Dale (WAL)	5–3	Cao Xinlong (CHN)
WC5	Jack Lisowski (ENG)	5–2	Rouzi Maimaiti (CHN)
WC6	Nigel Bond (ENG)	5–2	Thanawat Thirapongpaiboon (THA)
WC7	Robert Milkins (ENG)	5–0	Tang Jun (CHN)
WC8	Michael Holt (ENG)	5–3	Cai Jianzhong (CHN)

== Main draw ==
Last 32; Best of 9 frames
1	(England) Ali Carter	4
(England) Mark King	5
13	(England) Peter Ebdon	3
(Republic of Ireland) Fergal O'Brien	5
11	(England) Ronnie O'Sullivan	5
(Thailand) James Wattana	1
8	(Scotland) Stephen Maguire	4
(England) Anthony Hamilton	5
7	(England) Shaun Murphy	5
(Wales) Dominic Dale	4
12	(Northern Ireland) Mark Allen	5
(Wales) Ryan Day	2
15	(England) Jamie Cope	5
(England) Jack Lisowski	3
4	(England) Mark Selby	5
(England) Nigel Bond	3
3	(Wales) Mark Williams	5
(England) Andrew Higginson	0
16	(Scotland) Stephen Hendry	1
(England) Robert Milkins	5
14	(Wales) Matthew Stevens	5
(England) Stephen Lee	2
5	(China) Ding Junhui	3
(England) Martin Gould	5
6	(Australia) Neil Robertson	5
(China) Liang Wenbo	1
10	(Scotland) Graeme Dott	2
(England) Michael Holt	5
9	(England) Judd Trump	1
(England) Stuart Bingham	5
2	(Scotland) John Higgins	5
(England) Mark Davis	2

Last 16; Best of 9 frames
(England) Mark King	5
(Republic of Ireland) Fergal O'Brien	3
11	(England) Ronnie O'Sullivan	3
(England) Anthony Hamilton	5
7	(England) Shaun Murphy	5
12	(Northern Ireland) Mark Allen	4
15	(England) Jamie Cope	0
4	(England) Mark Selby	5
3	(Wales) Mark Williams	5
(England) Robert Milkins	1
14	(Wales) Matthew Stevens	5
(England) Martin Gould	1
6	(Australia) Neil Robertson	5
(England) Michael Holt	2
(England) Stuart Bingham	2
2	(Scotland) John Higgins	5

Quarter-finals; Best of 9 frames
(England) Mark King	5
(England) Anthony Hamilton	2
7	(England) Shaun Murphy	4
4	(England) Mark Selby	5
3	(Wales) Mark Williams	5
14	(Wales) Matthew Stevens	0
6	(Australia) Neil Robertson	5
2	(Scotland) John Higgins	2

Semi-finals; Best of 11 frames
(England) Mark King	0
4	(England) Mark Selby	6
3	(Wales) Mark Williams	6
6	(Australia) Neil Robertson	5

Final; Best of 19 frames
4	(England) Mark Selby	10
3	(Wales) Mark Williams	9

== Final ==
Final: Best of 19 frames. Referee: Eirian Williams. Shanghai Grand Stage, Shanghai, China, 11 September 2011.
Mark Selby (4); England	10–9	Mark Williams (3); Wales
Afternoon: 74–75 (Selby 74), 58–42, 115–0 (113), 38–76 (68), 83–1 (78), 0–132 (132), 84–55 (Williams 51), 95–0 (95), 45–68 (67); Evening: 55–25, 37–64, 63–42, 5–69, 39–70, 42–75, 6–88 (88), 83–48, 78–60, 69–0
113	Highest break	132
1	Century breaks	1
4	50+ breaks	5

== Qualifying ==
These matches took place between 31 July and 4 August 2011 at the World Snooker Academy, Sheffield, England.

Preliminary round

Best of 9 frames

(India) Lucky Vatnani	w/d–w/o	(Republic of Ireland) David Hogan
(Belgium) Luca Brecel	4–5	(England) Adam Duffy

Round 1–4

Round 1 Best of 9 frames
(Thailand) Dechawat Poomjaeng	3
(China) Tian Pengfei	5
(Wales) Michael White	5
(England) Simon Bedford	1
(England) Matthew Couch	1
(Thailand) James Wattana	5
(Belgium) Bjorn Haneveer	w/d
(Republic of Ireland) David Hogan	w/o
(England) Paul Davison	2
(China) Li Yan	5
(India) Aditya Mehta	5
(England) Stuart Carrington	0
(Wales) Daniel Wells	1
(England) David Grace	5
(Scotland) Scott MacKenzie	0
(England) Adam Wicheard	5
(Wales) Andrew Pagett	3
(Finland) Robin Hull	5
(Poland) Kacper Filipiak	0
(England) Andrew Norman	5
(Thailand) Passakorn Suwannawat	5
(England) Adam Duffy	2
(England) Sam Baird	1
(China) Yu Delu	5
(England) Sam Craigie	2
(Norway) Kurt Maflin	5
(Northern Ireland) Joe Meara	4
(China) Cao Yupeng	5
(England) Ben Woollaston	5
(England) David Gilbert	3
(England) Liam Highfield	3
(Republic of Ireland) David Morris	5

Round 2 Best of 9 frames
(China) Liu Song	5
(China) Tian Pengfei	4
(England) Alfie Burden	2
(Wales) Michael White	5
(England) Andy Hicks	2
(Thailand) James Wattana	5
(Scotland) Alan McManus	5
(Republic of Ireland) David Hogan	0
(China) Liu Chuang	5
(China) Li Yan	4
(England) Rod Lawler	4
(India) Aditya Mehta	5
(England) Jack Lisowski	5
(England) David Grace	0
(England) Jimmy White	5
(England) Adam Wicheard	3
(England) Peter Lines	5
(Finland) Robin Hull	3
(Northern Ireland) Joe Swail	4
(England) Andrew Norman	5
(England) Jimmy Robertson	2
(Thailand) Passakorn Suwannawat	5
(England) Ian McCulloch	5
(China) Yu Delu	1
(England) Joe Jogia	3
(Norway) Kurt Maflin	5
(China) Xiao Guodong	4
(China) Cao Yupeng	5
(Scotland) Anthony McGill	5
(England) Ben Woollaston	2
(England) Adrian Gunnell	5
(Republic of Ireland) David Morris	2

Round 3 Best of 9 frames
(Malta) Tony Drago	1
(China) Liu Song	5
(Republic of Ireland) Fergal O'Brien	5
(Wales) Michael White	2
(England) Dave Harold	2
(Thailand) James Wattana	5
(England) Anthony Hamilton	5
(Scotland) Alan McManus	3
(Scotland) Jamie Burnett	5
(China) Liu Chuang	1
(Wales) Jamie Jones	4
(India) Aditya Mehta	5
(England) Mike Dunn	0
(England) Jack Lisowski	5
(England) Nigel Bond	5
(England) Jimmy White	0
(England) Barry Pinches	5
(England) Peter Lines	4
(England) Robert Milkins	5
(England) Andrew Norman	4
(England) Steve Davis	1
(Thailand) Passakorn Suwannawat	5
(England) Matthew Selt	5
(England) Ian McCulloch	1
(England) Mark Joyce	0
(Norway) Kurt Maflin	5
(England) Michael Holt	5
(China) Cao Yupeng	3
(England) Tom Ford	5
(Scotland) Anthony McGill	1
(England) Rory McLeod	4
(England) Adrian Gunnell	5

Round 4 Best of 9 frames
(England) Mark King	5
(China) Liu Song	4
(England) Ricky Walden	1
(Republic of Ireland) Fergal O'Brien	5
(England) Joe Perry	1
(Thailand) James Wattana	5
(Republic of Ireland) Ken Doherty	2
(England) Anthony Hamilton	5
(Wales) Dominic Dale	5
(Scotland) Jamie Burnett	3
(Wales) Ryan Day	5
(India) Aditya Mehta	2
(Hong Kong) Marco Fu	1
(England) Jack Lisowski	5
(Scotland) Marcus Campbell	0
(England) Nigel Bond	5
(England) Andrew Higginson	5
(England) Barry Pinches	4
(Northern Ireland) Gerard Greene	4
(England) Robert Milkins	5
(England) Stephen Lee	5
(Thailand) Passakorn Suwannawat	1
(England) Martin Gould	5
(England) Matthew Selt	2
(China) Liang Wenbo	5
(Norway) Kurt Maflin	2
(England) Barry Hawkins	4
(England) Michael Holt	5
(England) Stuart Bingham	5
(England) Tom Ford	1
(England) Mark Davis	5
(England) Adrian Gunnell	4

== Century breaks ==
=== Qualifying stage centuries ===
- 145, 100 – Michael White
- 138, 107 – James Wattana
- 136, 104 – Fergal O'Brien
- 136 – Tom Ford
- 129 – Jamie Burnett
- 129 – Anthony Hamilton
- 127 – Robin Hull
- 123, 123, 100 – Kurt Maflin
- 123 – Ben Woollaston
- 120 – Nigel Bond
- 119, 110 – Passakorn Suwannawat
- 118 – Adam Duffy
- 117, 100 – Barry Pinches
- 115 – Mark Davis
- 114, 100 – Liu Chuang
- 114 – Aditya Mehta
- 111, 107, 103 – Stuart Bingham
- 111 – Anthony McGill
- 110 – Cao Yupeng
- 107 – Alfie Burden
- 104, 104 – Jack Lisowski
- 104, 100 – Adam Wicheard
- 102 – Dominic Dale
- 101 – Joe Jogia

=== Televised stage centuries ===
- 143, 102 – Shaun Murphy
- 132, 130, 129, 100 – Mark Williams
- 129, 123, 112, 107, 104 – Anthony Hamilton
- 129, 112 – Stuart Bingham
- 128, 102 – Dominic Dale
- 117, 113, 110 – Mark Selby
- 112 – John Higgins
- 111, 110 – Ronnie O'Sullivan
- 109 – Robert Milkins
- 101 – Jamie Cope
- 100 – Michael Holt
- 100 – Mark Allen
