= 2010 Championship League =

Championship League

Tournament information
- Dates: 4 January – 25 March 2010
- Venue: Crondon Park Golf Club
- City: Stock
- Country: England
- Organisation: Matchroom Sport
- Format: Non-ranking event
- Total prize fund: £173,900
- Winner's share: £10,000 (plus bonuses)
- Highest break: Peter Ebdon (ENG) (144); Marco Fu (HKG) (144)

Final
- Champion: Marco Fu (HKG)
- Runner-up: Mark Allen (NIR)
- Score: 3–2

The 2010 Championship League was a professional non-ranking snooker tournament that was played from 4 January to 25 March 2010 at the Crondon Park Golf Club in Stock, England.

Marco Fu won in the final 3–2 against Mark Allen, and earned a place in the 2010 Premier League Snooker.

== Prize fund ==
The breakdown of prize money for this year is shown below:

- Group 1–7
  - Winner: £3,000
  - Runner-up: £2,000
  - Semi-final: £1,000
  - Frame-win (league stage): £100
  - Frame-win (play-offs): £300
- Winners group
  - Winner: £10,000
  - Runner-up: £5,000
  - Semi-final: £3,000
  - Frame-win (league stage): £200
  - Frame-win (play-offs): £300
- Tournament total: £173,900

== Group one ==
Group one matches were played on 4 and 5 January 2010. Stephen Maguire was the first player to qualify for the winners group.

=== Matches ===
- Judd Trump 3–1 Ryan Day
- Mark Selby 2–3 Ali Carter
- Shaun Murphy 0–3 Stephen Maguire
- John Higgins 0–3 Judd Trump
- Ryan Day 2–3 Mark Selby
- Ali Carter 3–0 Shaun Murphy
- Stephen Maguire 3–2 John Higgins
- Judd Trump 1–3 Mark Selby
- Ryan Day 0–3 Ali Carter
- Shaun Murphy 1–3 John Higgins
- Mark Selby 3–2 John Higgins
- Stephen Maguire 3–2 Ali Carter
- Judd Trump 3–1 Stephen Maguire
- Ryan Day 1–3 Shaun Murphy
- Ali Carter 0–3 John Higgins
- Mark Selby 3–1 Stephen Maguire
- Judd Trump 3–1 Shaun Murphy
- Ryan Day 2–3 John Higgins
- Ryan Day 1–3 Stephen Maguire
- Mark Selby 0–3 Shaun Murphy
- Judd Trump 2–3 Ali Carter

=== Table ===
Pos	Player	Pld	W	L	FF	FA	FD	
1	Judd Trump (ENG)	6	4	2	15	9	+6	Qualification to Group 1 play-off
2	Ali Carter (ENG)	6	4	2	14	10	+4	Qualification to Group 1 play-off
3	Stephen Maguire (SCO)	6	4	2	14	11	+3	Qualification to Group 1 play-off
4	Mark Selby (ENG)	6	4	2	14	12	+2	Qualification to Group 1 play-off
5	John Higgins (SCO)	6	3	3	13	12	+1	Advances into Group 2
6	Shaun Murphy (ENG)	6	2	4	8	13	−5	Eliminated from the competition
7	Ryan Day (WAL)	6	0	6	7	18	−11	Eliminated from the competition

=== Play-offs ===
Semi-finals; Best of 5 frames
1	Judd Trump (ENG)	1
4	Mark Selby (ENG)	3
2	Ali Carter (ENG)	2
3	Stephen Maguire (SCO)	3

Final; Best of 5 frames
4	Mark Selby (ENG)	0
3	Stephen Maguire (SCO)	3

== Group two ==
Group two matches were played on 6 and 7 January 2010. John Higgins was the second player to qualify for the winners group.

=== Matches ===
- Ali Carter 3–1 John Higgins
- Mark Selby 1–3 Judd Trump
- Neil Robertson 0–3 Marco Fu
- Ronnie O'Sullivan 3–2 Mark Selby
- John Higgins 3–2 Neil Robertson
- Judd Trump 3–0 Ali Carter
- Marco Fu 0–3 Ronnie O'Sullivan
- Mark Selby 3–0 Ali Carter
- Judd Trump 1–3 John Higgins
- Neil Robertson 3–0 Ronnie O'Sullivan
- Ali Carter 3–1 Ronnie O'Sullivan
- Marco Fu 3–1 John Higgins
- Mark Selby 0–3 Marco Fu
- Judd Trump 2–3 Neil Robertson
- John Higgins 3–0 Ronnie O'Sullivan
- Ali Carter 1–3 Marco Fu
- Judd Trump 3–0 Ronnie O'Sullivan
- Mark Selby 3–2 Neil Robertson
- Ali Carter 3–0 Neil Robertson
- Judd Trump 1–3 Marco Fu
- Mark Selby 0–3 John Higgins

=== Table ===
Pos	Player	Pld	W	L	FF	FA	FD	
1	Marco Fu (HKG)	6	5	1	15	6	+9	Qualification to Group 2 play-off
2	John Higgins (SCO)	6	4	2	14	9	+5	Qualification to Group 2 play-off
3	Judd Trump (ENG)	6	3	3	13	10	+3	Qualification to Group 2 play-off
4	Ali Carter (ENG)	6	3	3	10	11	−1	Qualification to Group 2 play-off
5	Neil Robertson (AUS)	6	2	4	10	14	−4	Advances into Group 3
6	Mark Selby (ENG)	6	2	4	9	14	−5	Eliminated from the competition
7	Ronnie O'Sullivan (ENG)	6	2	4	7	14	−7	Eliminated from the competition

=== Play-offs ===
Semi-finals; Best of 5 frames
1	Marco Fu (HKG)	0
4	Ali Carter (ENG)	3
2	John Higgins (SCO)	3
3	Judd Trump (ENG)	2

Final; Best of 5 frames
4	Ali Carter (ENG)	1
2	John Higgins (SCO)	3

== Group three ==
Group three matches were played on 18 and 19 January 2010. Judd Trump was the third player to qualify for the winners group.

=== Matches ===
- Ali Carter 1–3 Marco Fu
- Judd Trump 3–1 Neil Robertson
- Stephen Hendry 2–3 Mark Allen
- Joe Perry 3–1 Ali Carter
- Marco Fu 1–3 Judd Trump
- Neil Robertson 3–2 Stephen Hendry
- Mark Allen 3–2 Joe Perry
- Ali Carter 0–3 Judd Trump
- Marco Fu 3–1 Neil Robertson
- Stephen Hendry 2–3 Joe Perry
- Judd Trump 3–1 Joe Perry
- Mark Allen 3–2 Neil Robertson
- Ali Carter 3–0 Mark Allen
- Marco Fu 3–1 Stephen Hendry
- Neil Robertson 3–0 Joe Perry
- Judd Trump 3–1 Mark Allen
- Marco Fu 3–1 Joe Perry
- Ali Carter 3–2 Stephen Hendry
- Judd Trump 2–3 Stephen Hendry
- Marco Fu 2–3 Mark Allen
- Ali Carter 3–2 Neil Robertson

=== Table ===
Pos	Player	Pld	W	L	FF	FA	FD	
1	Judd Trump (ENG)	6	5	1	17	7	+10	Qualification to Group 3 play-off
2	Marco Fu (HKG)	6	4	2	15	10	+5	Qualification to Group 3 play-off
3	Mark Allen (NIR)	6	4	2	13	14	−1	Qualification to Group 3 play-off
4	Ali Carter (ENG)	6	3	3	11	13	−2	Qualification to Group 3 play-off
5	Neil Robertson (AUS)	6	2	4	12	14	−2	Advances into Group 4
6	Joe Perry (ENG)	6	2	4	10	15	−5	Eliminated from the competition
7	Stephen Hendry (SCO)	6	1	5	12	17	−5	Eliminated from the competition

=== Play-offs ===
Semi-finals; Best of 5 frames
1	Judd Trump (ENG)	3
4	Ali Carter (ENG)	0
2	Marco Fu (HKG)	1
3	Mark Allen (NIR)	3

Final; Best of 5 frames
1	Judd Trump (ENG)	3
3	Mark Allen (NIR)	2

== Group four ==
Group four matches were played on 20 and 21 January 2010. Marco Fu was the fourth player to qualify for the winners group.

=== Matches ===
- Mark Allen 0–3 Marco Fu
- Ali Carter 1–3 Neil Robertson
- Peter Ebdon 1–3 Mark Williams
- Liang Wenbo 1–3 Mark Allen
- Marco Fu 3–0 Ali Carter
- Neil Robertson 0–3 Peter Ebdon
- Mark Williams 0–3 Liang Wenbo
- Mark Allen 3–2 Ali Carter
- Marco Fu 2–3 Neil Robertson
- Peter Ebdon 3–1 Liang Wenbo
- Ali Carter 2–3 Liang Wenbo
- Mark Williams 1–3 Neil Robertson
- Mark Allen 0–3 Mark Williams
- Marco Fu 3–1 Peter Ebdon
- Neil Robertson 3–1 Liang Wenbo
- Ali Carter 2–3 Mark Williams
- Marco Fu 3–2 Liang Wenbo
- Mark Allen 3–2 Peter Ebdon
- Ali Carter 0–3 Peter Ebdon
- Marco Fu 0–3 Mark Williams
- Mark Allen 1–3 Neil Robertson

=== Table ===
Pos	Player	Pld	W	L	FF	FA	FD	
1	Neil Robertson (AUS)	6	5	1	15	9	+6	Qualification to Group 4 play-off
2	Marco Fu (HKG)	6	4	2	14	9	+5	Qualification to Group 4 play-off
3	Mark Williams (WAL)	6	4	2	13	9	+4	Qualification to Group 4 play-off
4	Peter Ebdon (ENG)	6	3	3	13	10	+3	Qualification to Group 4 play-off
5	Mark Allen (NIR)	6	3	3	10	14	−4	Advances into Group 5
6	Liang Wenbo (CHN)	6	2	4	11	14	−3	Eliminated from the competition
7	Ali Carter (ENG)	6	0	6	7	18	−11	Eliminated from the competition

=== Play-offs ===
Semi-finals; Best of 5 frames
1	Neil Robertson (AUS)	3
4	Peter Ebdon (ENG)	1
2	Marco Fu (HKG)	3
3	Mark Williams (WAL)	2

Final; Best of 5 frames
1	Neil Robertson (AUS)	0
2	Marco Fu (HKG)	3

== Group five ==
Group five matches were played on 8 and 9 February 2010. Mark Allen was to play in this group, but he moved to group six and was replaced by Ricky Walden. Neil Robertson was the fifth player to qualify for the winners group.

=== Matches ===
- Neil Robertson 3–1 Mark Williams
- Peter Ebdon 3–0 Ricky Walden
- Barry Hawkins 2–3 Jamie Cope
- Dave Harold 1–3 Neil Robertson
- Mark Williams 2–3 Peter Ebdon
- Ricky Walden 3–2 Barry Hawkins
- Jamie Cope 3–1 Dave Harold
- Neil Robertson 2–3 Peter Ebdon
- Mark Williams 3–2 Ricky Walden
- Barry Hawkins 3–1 Dave Harold
- Peter Ebdon 1–3 Dave Harold
- Jamie Cope 3–0 Ricky Walden
- Neil Robertson 3–2 Jamie Cope
- Mark Williams 3–0 Barry Hawkins
- Ricky Walden 3–0 Dave Harold
- Peter Ebdon 2–3 Jamie Cope
- Mark Williams 3–1 Dave Harold
- Neil Robertson 2–3 Barry Hawkins
- Peter Ebdon 2–3 Barry Hawkins
- Mark Williams 3–2 Jamie Cope
- Neil Robertson 3–2 Ricky Walden

=== Table ===
Pos	Player	Pld	W	L	FF	FA	FD	
1	Jamie Cope (ENG)	6	4	2	16	11	+5	Qualification to Group 5 play-off
2	Neil Robertson (AUS)	6	4	2	16	12	+4	Qualification to Group 5 play-off
3	Mark Williams (WAL)	6	4	2	15	11	+4	Qualification to Group 5 play-off
4	Peter Ebdon (ENG)	6	3	3	14	13	+1	Qualification to Group 5 play-off
5	Barry Hawkins (ENG)	6	3	3	13	14	−1	Advances into Group 6
6	Ricky Walden (ENG)	6	2	4	10	14	−4	Eliminated from the competition
7	Dave Harold (ENG)	6	1	5	7	16	−9	Eliminated from the competition

=== Play-offs ===
Semi-finals; Best of 5 frames
1	Jamie Cope (ENG)	3
4	Peter Ebdon (ENG)	0
2	Neil Robertson (AUS)	3
3	Mark Williams (WAL)	0

Final; Best of 5 frames
1	Jamie Cope (ENG)	0
2	Neil Robertson (AUS)	3

== Group six ==
Group six matches are played on 10 and 11 February 2010. Mark Allen was the sixth player to qualify for the winners group.

=== Matches ===
- Jamie Cope 0–3 Mark Williams
- Peter Ebdon 3–0 Barry Hawkins
- Mark Allen 3–2 Stuart Bingham
- Joe Swail 1–3 Jamie Cope
- Mark Williams 1–3 Peter Ebdon
- Barry Hawkins 1–3 Mark Allen
- Stuart Bingham 1–3 Joe Swail
- Jamie Cope 3–2 Peter Ebdon
- Mark Williams 3–0 Barry Hawkins
- Mark Allen 2–3 Joe Swail
- Peter Ebdon 3–1 Joe Swail
- Stuart Bingham 3–2 Barry Hawkins
- Jamie Cope 0–3 Stuart Bingham
- Mark Williams 0–3 Mark Allen
- Barry Hawkins 0–3 Joe Swail
- Peter Ebdon 3–2 Stuart Bingham
- Mark Williams 1–3 Joe Swail
- Jamie Cope 3–2 Mark Allen
- Peter Ebdon 2–3 Mark Allen
- Mark Williams 3–0 Stuart Bingham
- Jamie Cope 2–3 Barry Hawkins

=== Table ===
Pos	Player	Pld	W	L	FF	FA	FD	
1	Peter Ebdon (ENG)	6	4	2	16	10	+6	Qualification to Group 6 play-off
2	Mark Allen (NIR)	6	4	2	16	11	+5	Qualification to Group 6 play-off
3	Joe Swail (NIR)	6	4	2	14	10	+4	Qualification to Group 6 play-off
4	Mark Williams (WAL)	6	3	3	11	9	+2	Qualification to Group 6 play-off
5	Jamie Cope (ENG)	6	3	3	11	14	−3	Advances into Group 7
6	Stuart Bingham (ENG)	6	2	4	11	14	−3	Eliminated from the competition
7	Barry Hawkins (ENG)	6	1	5	6	17	−11	Eliminated from the competition

=== Play-offs ===
Semi-finals; Best of 5 frames
1	Peter Ebdon (ENG)	3
4	Mark Williams (WAL)	1
2	Mark Allen (NIR)	3
3	Joe Swail (NIR)	0

Final; Best of 5 frames
1	Peter Ebdon (ENG)	0
2	Mark Allen (NIR)	3

== Group seven ==
Group seven matches were played on 22 and 23 March 2010. Jamie Cope was the seventh player to qualify for the winners group.

=== Matches ===
- Peter Ebdon 3–1 Joe Swail
- Mark Williams 3–0 Jamie Cope
- Ding Junhui 3–0 Steve Davis
- Michael Holt 1–3 Peter Ebdon
- Joe Swail 0–3 Mark Williams
- Jamie Cope 0–3 Ding Junhui
- Steve Davis 1–3 Michael Holt
- Peter Ebdon 3–2 Mark Williams
- Joe Swail 0–3 Jamie Cope
- Ding Junhui 1–3 Michael Holt
- Mark Williams 3–0 Michael Holt
- Steve Davis 0–3 Jamie Cope
- Peter Ebdon 3–2 Steve Davis
- Joe Swail 1–3 Ding Junhui
- Jamie Cope 3–2 Michael Holt
- Mark Williams 3–0 Steve Davis
- Joe Swail 3–0 Michael Holt
- Peter Ebdon 3–1 Ding Junhui
- Mark Williams 3–2 Ding Junhui
- Joe Swail 1–3 Steve Davis
- Peter Ebdon 1–3 Jamie Cope

=== Table ===
Pos	Player	Pld	W	L	FF	FA	FD	
1	Mark Williams (WAL)	6	5	1	17	5	+12	Qualification to Group 7 play-off
2	Peter Ebdon (ENG)	6	5	1	16	10	+6	Qualification to Group 7 play-off
3	Jamie Cope (ENG)	6	4	2	12	9	+3	Qualification to Group 7 play-off
4	Ding Junhui (CHN)	6	3	3	13	10	+3	Qualification to Group 7 play-off
5	Michael Holt (ENG)	6	2	4	9	14	−5	Eliminated from the competition
6	Joe Swail (NIR)	6	1	5	6	15	−9	Eliminated from the competition
7	Steve Davis (ENG)	6	1	5	6	16	−10	Eliminated from the competition

=== Play-offs ===
Semi-finals; Best of 5 frames
1	Mark Williams (WAL)	0
4	Ding Junhui (CHN)	3
2	Peter Ebdon (ENG)	2
3	Jamie Cope (ENG)	3

Final; Best of 5 frames
4	Ding Junhui (CHN)	1
3	Jamie Cope (ENG)	3

== Winners group ==
The matches of the winners group were played on 24 and 25 March 2010. Marco Fu has qualified for the 2010 Premier League.

=== Matches ===
- Stephen Maguire 2–3 John Higgins
- Judd Trump 2–3 Marco Fu
- Neil Robertson 2–3 Mark Allen
- Jamie Cope 1–3 Stephen Maguire
- John Higgins 2–3 Judd Trump
- Marco Fu 0–3 Neil Robertson
- Mark Allen 3–2 Jamie Cope
- Stephen Maguire 3–0 Judd Trump
- John Higgins 1–3 Marco Fu
- Neil Robertson 3–2 Jamie Cope
- Judd Trump 3–0 Jamie Cope
- Mark Allen 3–0 Marco Fu
- Stephen Maguire 3–2 Mark Allen
- John Higgins 1–3 Neil Robertson
- Marco Fu 3–0 Jamie Cope
- Judd Trump 0–3 Mark Allen
- John Higgins 0–3 Jamie Cope
- Stephen Maguire 3–2 Neil Robertson
- Judd Trump 2–3 Neil Robertson
- John Higgins 3–2 Mark Allen
- Stephen Maguire 3–0 Marco Fu

=== Table ===
Pos	Player	Pld	W	L	FF	FA	FD	
1	Stephen Maguire (SCO)	6	5	1	17	8	+9	Qualification to Winners' Group play-off
2	Mark Allen (NIR)	6	4	2	16	10	+6	Qualification to Winners' Group play-off
3	Neil Robertson (AUS)	6	4	2	16	11	+5	Qualification to Winners' Group play-off
4	Marco Fu (HKG)	6	3	3	9	12	−3	Qualification to Winners' Group play-off
5	Judd Trump (ENG)	6	2	4	10	14	−4	Eliminated from the competition
6	John Higgins (SCO)	6	2	4	10	16	−6	Eliminated from the competition
7	Jamie Cope (ENG)	6	1	5	8	15	−7	Eliminated from the competition

Source: ^{[usurped]}

=== Play-offs ===
Semi-finals; Best of 5 frames
1	Stephen Maguire (SCO)	0
4	Marco Fu (HKG)	3
2	Mark Allen (NIR)	3
3	Neil Robertson (AUS)	2

Final; Best of 5 frames
4	Marco Fu (HKG)	3
2	Mark Allen (NIR)	2

== Century breaks ==
Total: 94

- 144, 141, 139, 130, 122, 114, 102, 102, 101, 101 – Peter Ebdon
- 144, 134, 133, 130, 122, 120, 111, 110, 104, 104, 104, 103 – Marco Fu
- 143, 135, 117, 104, 104 – Mark Williams
- 142 – Barry Hawkins
- 140, 118, 110, 101, 101 – Stephen Maguire
- 138 – John Higgins
- 138 – Ronnie O'Sullivan
- 137, 131, 112, 109 – Ding Junhui
- 136, 136, 127, 110, 110 – Ali Carter
- 135, 131, 122, 116, 116, 115, 113, 113, 111, 110, 105, 104, 103, 101, 100, 100, 100 – Neil Robertson
- 133, 113, 105, 102, 102, 100, 100 – Jamie Cope
- 133 – Ricky Walden
- 131, 128, 122 – Mark Selby
- 124, 110 – Stuart Bingham
- 118, 110, 108, 107, 107, 106, 104, 103, 102, 101, 100 – Judd Trump
- 114, 107, 103, 100, 100 – Mark Allen
- 112, 109 – Shaun Murphy
- 106 – Stephen Hendry
- 101 – Joe Perry

== Winnings ==
No.	Player	1	2	3	4	5	6	7	W	TOTAL
1	Marco Fu (HKG)		2,500	2,800	6,200				13,600	25,100
2	Mark Allen (NIR)			4,800	1,000		6,400		9,700	21,900
3	Neil Robertson (AUS)		1,000	1,200	4,400	6,400			6,800	19,800
4	Judd Trump (ENG)	2,800	2,900	6,500					2,000	14,200
5	Jamie Cope (ENG)					4,500	1,100	6,000	1,600	13,200
6	Peter Ebdon (ENG)				2,600	2,400	4,500	3,200		12,700
7	Stephen Maguire (SCO)	6,200							6,400	12,600
8	Mark Williams (WAL)				2,900	2,500	2,400	2,700		10,500
9	Ali Carter (ENG)	3,000	4,200	2,100	700					10,000
10	John Higgins (SCO)	1,300	6,200						2,000	9,500
11	Mark Selby (ENG)	4,300	900							5,200
12	Ding Junhui (CHN)							4,500		4,500
13	Joe Swail (NIR)						2,400	600		3,000
14	Barry Hawkins (ENG)					1,300	600			1,900
15	Stephen Hendry (SCO)			1,200						1,200
16	Liang Wenbo (CHN)				1,100					1,100
=	Stuart Bingham (ENG)						1,100			1,100
18	Joe Perry (ENG)			1,000						1,000
=	Ricky Walden (ENG)					1,000				1,000
20	Michael Holt (ENG)							900		900
21	Shaun Murphy (ENG)	800								800
22	Ryan Day (WAL)	700								700
=	Ronnie O'Sullivan (ENG)		700							700
=	Dave Harold (ENG)					700				700
25	Steve Davis (ENG)							600		600
	Total prize money	19,100	18,400	19,600	18,900	18,800	18,500	18,500	42,100	173,900

Green: Won the group. All prize money in GBP.
Source=Championship League Snooker by Matchroom Sport
