= 2011 Hainan Classic =

Chinalife Xingpai Hainan Classic

Tournament information
- Dates: 10–13 March 2011
- Venue: Boao Conference Center
- City: Boao
- Country: China
- Organisation: 110 Sport Management Group
- Format: Non-ranking event
- Total prize fund: £100,000
- Winner's share: £40,000
- Highest break: 142

Final
- Champion: (Scotland) John Higgins
- Runner-up: (England) Jamie Cope
- Score: 7–2

The 2011 Chinalife Xingpai Hainan Classic was a professional non-ranking snooker tournament that took place between 10 and 13 March 2011 at the Boao Conference Center in Boao, China.

John Higgins won in the final 7–2 against Jamie Cope.

== Prize fund ==
The breakdown of prize money for this year is shown below:

- Winner: £40,000
- Runner-up: £18,000
- Semi-finalists: £7,000
- 2nd in group: £3,500
- 3rd in group: £1,500
- 4th in group: £500
- Highest break: £1,000
- Maximum break: £5,000
- Total: £100,000

== Round-robin stage ==
=== Group A ===
Table

POS	Player	MP	MW	FW	FL	FD	PTS
1	(Scotland) John Higgins	3	3	6	1	+5	3
2	(Scotland) Stephen Hendry	3	2	4	3	+1	2
3	(England) Peter Ebdon	3	1	4	4	0	1
4	(China) Li Yan	3	0	0	6	−6	0

Results:

- John Higgins 2–1 Peter Ebdon
- Stephen Hendry 2–0 Li Yan
- Peter Ebdon 1–2 Stephen Hendry
- John Higgins 2–0 Stephen Hendry
- Peter Ebdon 2–0 Li Yan
- John Higgins 2–0 Li Yan

=== Group B ===
Table

POS	Player	MP	MW	FW	FL	FD	PTS
1	(England) Jamie Cope	3	3	6	1	+5	3
2	(China) Jin Long	3	2	4	4	0	2
3	(Australia) Neil Robertson	3	1	4	5	−1	1
4	(China) Cao Yupeng	3	0	2	6	−4	0

Results:

- Neil Robertson 2–1 Cao Yupeng
- Jamie Cope 2–0 Jin Long
- Neil Robertson 1–2 Jamie Cope
- Cao Yupeng 1–2 Jin Long
- Cao Yupeng 0–2 Jamie Cope
- Neil Robertson 1–2 Jin Long

=== Group C ===
Table

POS	Player	MP	MW	FW	FL	FD	HB	PTS
1	(England) Ali Carter^{[a]}	3	2	5	3	+2	88	2
2	(England) Shaun Murphy^{[a]}	3	2	5	3	+2	67	2
3	(China) Tian Pengfei^{[a]}	3	2	5	3	+2	52	2
4	(Northern Ireland) Dennis Taylor	3	0	0	6	−6	–	0

Results:

- Ali Carter 2–0 Dennis Taylor
- Shaun Murphy 2–1 Tian Pengfei
- Shaun Murphy 1–2 Ali Carter
- Dennis Taylor 0–2 Tian Pengfei
- Shaun Murphy 2–0 Dennis Taylor
- Ali Carter 1–2 Tian Pengfei

^{*}Ali Carter went through as he made the highest break in the group. (Carter 88, Murphy 67, Tian 52)

=== Group D ===
Table

POS	Player	MP	MW	FW	FL	FD	PTS
1	(Scotland) Graeme Dott	3	3	6	1	+5	3
2	(China) Yu Delu	3	2	5	2	+3	2
3	(China) Ding Junhui	3	1	2	5	−3	1
4	(England) Ricky Walden	3	0	1	6	−5	0

Results:

- Graeme Dott 2–0 Ricky Walden
- Ding Junhui 0–2 Graeme Dott
- Ricky Walden 0–2 Yu Delu
- Ding Junhui 0–2 Yu Delu
- Ding Junhui 2–1 Ricky Walden
- Graeme Dott 2–1 Yu Delu

== Knock-out stage ==
Semi-finals; Best of 9 frames
(Scotland) John Higgins	5
(England) Ali Carter	3
(England) Jamie Cope	5
(Scotland) Graeme Dott	1

Final; Best of 13 frames
(Scotland) John Higgins	7
(England) Jamie Cope	2

== Charity exhibition match ==
Stars Challenge Team	Results	Chinese Stars Challenge Team
Ali Carter	82–0	Tian Pengfei
Graeme Dott	61–49	Cao Yupeng
John Higgins	34–73	Jin Long
Neil Robertson	73–16	Li Yan
Shaun Murphy	80–16	Yu Delu
Stephen Hendry	4–121	Ding Junhui
4	Overall	2

== Century breaks ==
- 142 – Jamie Cope
- 141 – Graeme Dott
- 117, 113 – Ding Junhui
- 111, 109 – John Higgins
- 101 – Neil Robertson
- 101 – Yu Delu

== Notes ==
- ^{a} Carter went through, because he made the highest break in the group. (Carter 88, Murphy 67 and Tian 52)
