= Jamie Cope =

English snooker player

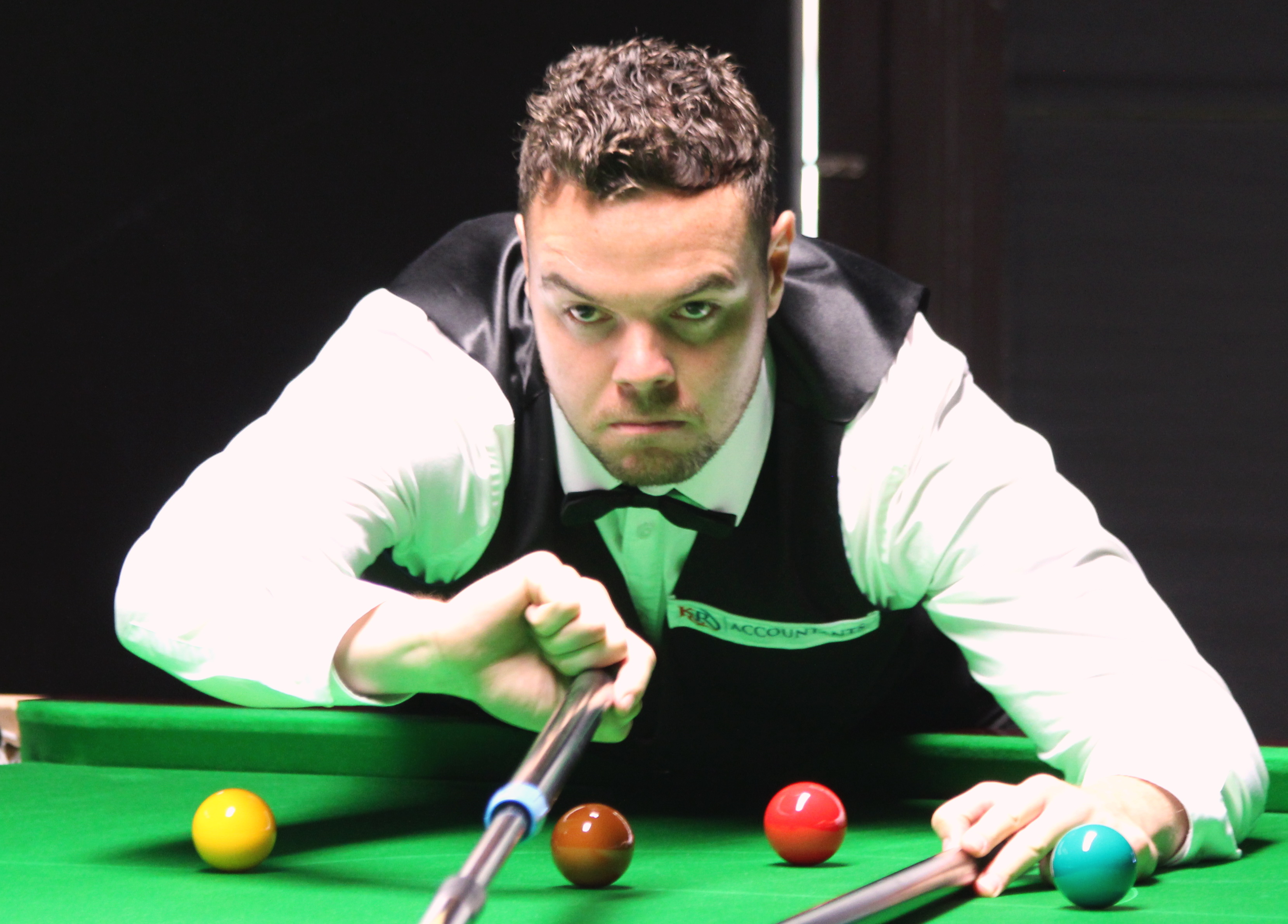
- Cope at the 2016 Paul Hunter Classic

Personal information
- Nickname: The Shotgun
- Born: 12 September 1985 (age 41) Longton, Staffordshire, England

Sport
- Country: England
- Sport: Snooker
- Professional: 2002–2004, 2005–2017
- Highest ranking: 13 (September 2010 and December 2010 – February 2011)
- Maximum breaks: 3
- Century breaks: 164
- Best ranking finish: Runner-up (x2)

Jamie Cope (born 12 September 1985) is an English former professional snooker player.

A finalist in two ranking tournaments, the 2006 Grand Prix and the 2007 China Open, Cope also reached the semi-finals of the 2011 Masters. He reached his highest ranking, 13th, in September 2010, but thereafter developed a tremor which has been attributed to being either an essential tremor or the yips, which makes his cue arm shake. This condition caused Cope to slip markedly down the rankings in the 2010s, culminating in his relegation from the main tour at the end of the 2016–17 season. He was known for his fast, entertaining style, being nicknamed "Shotgun" due to his speed around the table and aggressive playing style.

== Career ==
=== Early career ===
Cope had an impressive record as a junior, but dropped off the Main Tour after two largely unsuccessful seasons. However, he finished top in the Challenge Tour for emerging players in the 2004–05 season, winning two of its four tournaments. This enabled him to return to the Main Tour. His stated intention in pre-season was to finish the year in the Top 48, a tough target which he technically achieved by default after Paul Hunter's illness. He reached the last 16 of the season-opening Grand Prix tournament. Later in the 2005–06 season he reached the same stage of the Welsh Open and China Open. Those three last-16 defeats were all 5–4. During the season he claimed wins over Joe Perry, Steve Davis, John Parrott and Alan McManus.

Cope has the distinction of being the first player in snooker history to post a verified 155 break achieved in a practice frame in 2005.

=== 2006–2010 ===
On 23 October 2006, Cope made a 147 break in a match against Michael Holt during the Grand Prix in Aberdeen, Scotland. He was only the third player to achieve a 147 in the tournament's history, after Ronnie O'Sullivan and John Higgins. (Tom Ford has since become the fourth man to make a 147 at the Grand Prix, on 15 October 2007.) After progressing from the group stages, Cope defeated Robert Milkins in the last-16 to reach his first quarter-final in ranking events. He beat Joe Perry again in a closely fought match which required a deciding ninth frame. Eventually, Cope won after a slip-up by Perry on the yellow. In the semi-finals Cope defeated Mark King 6–3, but he lost 5–9 to Australian competitor Neil Robertson in the final. Cope had struggled early in the match and fell 2–8 behind. He briefly rallied to claim the next three frames, but Robertson won the fourteenth frame to clinch the title. On 31 March 2007, Cope progressed into the final of the China Open against Graeme Dott, after beating Barry Hawkins on the last black of the final frame in the semi-finals, after requiring a snooker. However, he lost the final, again by 5 frames to 9.

In the 2007–08 season, he reached the last 32 of the Shanghai Masters losing 2–5 to John Higgins. He failed to progress beyond the group stages in the Grand Prix 2007, finishing sixth in his group, not winning a match. In the UK Championship Cope produced a very good performance in beating the then world number one John Higgins 9–3 in the last 32. He then beat Barry Hawkins 9–8 in the last 16, before losing to eventual champion Ronnie O'Sullivan in the quarter-finals. Cope made his World Championship debut in 2008, losing 10–9 to Peter Ebdon in the first round.

At the 2008 Shanghai Masters, Cope scored the second competitive 147 of his career against Mark Williams, but lost their last-16 match 2–5. In the 2009 World Championship, Cope beat Joe Perry in the first round 10–6 and was close to upsetting twice world champion John Higgins in the second round. He was 12–10 up and was looking good to win the match, but ultimately Higgins surged back to win 13–12. This meant that he finished the season ranked at No. 18, still unable to break into the elite top 16. In the 2009–10 season he never progressed beyond the second round of a ranking tournament. Although he qualified for the World Championship, he lost 10–4 in the first round to Ali Carter. On top of this, an unexpected run to the final by Graeme Dott meant that Dott overtook Cope in the rankings and left Cope outside the world's top 16 for another season, albeit at a career high ranking of 17th.

=== 2010/2011 season ===
In the 2010/2011 season, the two-year ranking system was replaced with a rolling ranking, meaning that Cope was finally able to reach the top 16 in October 2010. Cope made his debut at the Masters, where he reached the semi-final stage with wins over Shaun Murphy and Mark King. He played Ding Junhui in the semi-final, but lost 3–6. He was knocked out of the World Championship in the last 16 following a 4–13 loss to Mark Williams, but despite this he finished the season ranked 15.

=== 2011/2012 season ===
Cope began the 2011–12 season with a first round loss in the Australian Goldfields Open and a second round defeat in the Shanghai Masters, resulting in him losing his place in the top 16 after the first rankings cut-off in October, as he was placed number 18. Therefore, Cope was now required to win a qualifying match to reach the main draw of the ranking events. He failed to do this in the next three tournaments, losing to Joe Jogia, Yu Delu and Ken Doherty, in attempting to qualify for the UK Championship, German Masters and Welsh Open respectively. Cope stopped the rot by beating Jamie Burnett to earn a place in the World Open, held in Haikou, China. He played Martin Gould in the first round and, after finding himself 2–4 down, produced a comeback to win the last three frames to set up a last-16 clash with John Higgins. Cope could not continue his run in the tournament, however, being whitewashed 0–5 by the reigning world champion. Cope also qualified for the China Open, but was this time on the wrong end of a 4–5 scoreline, as he was edged out by Neil Robertson in the first round. Cope's season came to an end soon after this, as he lost in qualifying for the World Championship to Liu Chuang. He was ranked world number 27, meaning he had dropped 12 places during the year, the most of any player who finished the season inside the top 32.

=== 2012/2013 season ===
Cope's best finishes of the 2012–13 season were last 16 defeats in the first three ranking events of the year, which did include a 5–1 victory over world number one Mark Selby in the first round of the Shanghai Masters. In the rest of the season Cope struggled for form as he lost his qualifying match in the next three ranking events, and although he qualified for the World Open and the China Open, he lost 2–5 in the first round to Graeme Dott in the former and 2–5 in the wildcard round to Zhao Xintong in the latter. Cope played in eight of the ten Players Tour Championship events, but could not advance beyond the last 16 in any of them to finish 50th on the PTC Order of Merit. His season ended when he lost 3–10 to world number 70 Dechawat Poomjaeng in the final round of World Championship Qualifying. His drop down the rankings continued as he ended the year ranked world number 38, outside of the top 32 for the first time since 2006.

=== 2013/2014 season ===
Cope lost 5–2 in the first round against Joe Perry as he started his 2013–14 season at the Wuxi Classic. He then beat Martin Gould 5–4 at the Australian Goldfields Open, before home favourite Neil Robertson eliminated him 5–3 in the second round. In the next four ranking events he lost in the first round of the UK Championship to David Morris and failed to qualify for the others. In February, after Cope whitewashed Gareth Green 5–0 to qualify for the China Open and beat Ryan Clark 4–1 in the first round of the Welsh Open, he revealed that he had been working with a sports psychologist in an attempt to help him with the yips in his cue arm which have plagued his results in recent years. His draw in the following matches was not kind as lost 5–1 to Ding Junhui in the next round, a player who had already won four ranking events this season, and 5–1 to Shaun Murphy in China, who had won the World Open two weeks earlier.

In World Championship qualifying, Cope defeated John Astley 10–2, Alex Borg 10–7 and Mark King 10–7 to reach the main draw of snooker's biggest tournament for the first time in three years. In the first round he led Murphy 7–5, but the match went into a deciding frame with Cope losing it on the colours. Cope said later that he was unable to control his arm in the second session of the match which had caused him to jab at the cue ball.

=== 2014/2015 season ===
Cope qualified for the Wuxi Classic for the third year in a row, but was beaten 5–3 by Michael White in the first round. He lost 6–4 to John Higgins in the second round of the UK Championship and was edged out 4–3 by Neil Robertson in the third round of the Welsh Open. Cope's second last 32 appearance in a ranking event this season was at the Indian Open after defeating Fraser Patrick, but he lost 4–2 to Higgins. His year finished with a 10–9 loss on the final black to Steve Davis in the first round of World Championship qualifying. This result meant that Cope fell out of the top 64 of the season-end world rankings; however, he saved his tour place thanks to his 44th position on the European Order of Merit which earned him a fresh two-year tour card.

=== 2015/2016 season ===
Cope won four matches to qualify for the 2015 Shanghai Masters and then progressed through a wildcard match once in China. In the first round of the event, Cope secured his best win in a number of years by holding on from 3–0 ahead of world number four Neil Robertson to edge it 5–4. He was 3–0 behind Mark Williams in the second round and could not recover as he was defeated 5–3. He also qualified for the International Championship, but lost 6–4 to Kyren Wilson in the opening round. Cope came from 4–1 down to Rory McLeod in the first round of the UK Championship to win 6–5, but was whitewashed 6–0 by Stephen Maguire in the second round. He also failed to win a frame in the opening round of the Welsh Open as Ben Woollaston saw him off 4–0.

=== 2016/2017 season ===
An extremely quiet season saw Cope reach the last 64 of five events, but he was unable to go any further in any of them. He ended the season at world number 76, outside the top 64 in the world rankings, and played in the 2017 Q School. Cope was eliminated in the fifth round of event one and the second round of event two, and was consequently relegated from the professional snooker tour.

=== 2017/18 ===
He entered the 2018 Q School in a bid to win back his place on the snooker professional tour. In the second event he reached the final stage, but was beaten 4–1 by Jordan Brown.

=== 2019/20 ===
He announced his retirement from snooker on 25 May.

== Performance and rankings timeline ==
Tournament	2002/ 03	2003/ 04	2004/ 05	2005/ 06	2006/ 07	2007/ 08	2008/ 09	2009/ 10	2010/ 11	2011/ 12	2012/ 13	2013/ 14	2014/ 15	2015/ 16	2016/ 17	2017/ 18	2018/ 19
Ranking (Note: From the 2010/2011 season it shows the ranking at the beginning of the season.)	(Note: New players on the Main Tour don't have a ranking.)	97	(Note: He was an amateur.)		47	22	19	18	17	15	27	38	43	(Note: Players qualified through European Tour Order of Merit started the season without prize money ranking points.)	78		
Ranking tournaments
Riga Masters (Note: The event was called the Riga Open (2014/2015–2015/2016))	Tournament Not Held												Minor-Rank.		1R	A	WD
World Open (Note: The event was called the LG Cup (2002/2003-2003/2004), the Grand Prix (2004/2005–2009/2010), the World Open (2010/2011) and the Haikou World Open (2011/2012–2013/2014))	LQ	LQ	A	3R	F	RR	QF	2R	2R	2R	1R	LQ	Not held		1R	A	A
Paul Hunter Classic (Note: The event was called the Grand Prix Fürth (2004/2005) and the Fürth German Open (2005/2006–2006/2007))	Not Held		Pro-am Event						Minor-Ranking Event						1R	3R	A
China Championship	Tournament Not Held														NR	A	A
European Masters (Note: The event was called the Malta Cup (2004/2005–2007/2008))	LQ	LQ	A	LQ	LQ	NR	Tournament Not Held								LQ	A	A
English Open	Tournament Not Held														1R	A	A
International Championship	Tournament Not Held										LQ	LQ	LQ	1R	LQ	A	A
Northern Ireland Open	Tournament Not Held														2R	A	A
UK Championship	LQ	LQ	A	1R	LQ	QF	LQ	1R	1R	LQ	LQ	1R	2R	2R	1R	A	A
Scottish Open (Note: The event was called the Players Championship (2003/2004))	LQ	LQ	Tournament Not held								MR	Not Held			1R	A	A
German Masters	Tournament Not Held								1R	LQ	LQ	LQ	LQ	LQ	LQ	A	A
World Grand Prix	Tournament Not Held												NR	DNQ	DNQ	DNQ	DNQ
Welsh Open	LQ	LQ	A	3R	2R	2R	LQ	2R	2R	LQ	WD	2R	3R	1R	2R	A	A
Shoot-Out	Tournament Not Held								Non-Ranking Event						1R	1R	A
Indian Open	Tournament Not Held											1R	2R	NH	LQ	A	A
Players Championship (Note: The event was called the Players Tour Championship Grand Finals (2010/2011–2012/2013) and the Players Championship Grand Final (2013/2014–2015/2016))	Tournament Not Held								DNQ	DNQ	DNQ	DNQ	DNQ	DNQ	DNQ	DNQ	DNQ
Gibraltar Open	Tournament Not Held													MR	1R	3R	A
Tour Championship	Tournament Not Held																DNQ
China Open	Not Held		A	2R	F	1R	1R	1R	1R	1R	WR	1R	1R	LQ	1R	A	A
World Championship	LQ	LQ	LQ	LQ	LQ	1R	2R	1R	2R	LQ	LQ	1R	LQ	LQ	LQ	LQ	A
Non-ranking tournaments
The Masters	LQ	LQ	A	LQ	WD	LQ	LQ	LQ	SF	A	A	A	A	A	A	A	A
Championship League	Tournament Not Held					RR	RR	2R	RR	RR	A	A	A	A	A	A	A
Former ranking tournaments
British Open	LQ	LQ	A	Tournament Not Held													
Irish Masters	LQ	LQ	A	NH	NR	Tournament Not Held											
Northern Ireland Trophy	Not Held			NR	LQ	2R	2R	Tournament Not Held									
Bahrain Championship	Tournament Not Held						1R	Tournament Not Held									
Wuxi Classic (Note: The event was called the Jiangsu Classic (2008/2009–2009/2010))	Tournament Not Held						Non-Ranking Event				2R	1R	1R	Not Held			
Australian Goldfields Open	Tournament Not Held									1R	2R	2R	A	LQ	Not Held		
Shanghai Masters	Tournament Not held					1R	2R	2R	SF	2R	2R	LQ	LQ	2R	LQ	A	NR
Former non-ranking tournaments
Six-red World Championship (Note: The event was called the Six-red Snooker International (2008/2009) and the Six-red World Grand Prix (2009/2010))	Tournament Not Held						A	A	SF	NH	A	A	A	A	A	A	A
Hainan Classic	Tournament Not Held								F	Tournament Not Held							
Brazil Masters	Tournament Not Held									1R	Tournament Not Held						
Shoot-Out	Tournament Not held								1R	1R	1R	2R	1R	A	Ranking		

Performance Table Legend
LQ	lost in the qualifying draw	#R	lost in the early rounds of the tournament (WR = Wildcard round, RR = Round robin)	QF	lost in the quarter-finals
SF	lost in the semi-finals	F	lost in the final	W	won the tournament
DNQ	did not qualify for the tournament	A	did not participate in the tournament	WD	withdrew from the tournament

NH / Not Held	means an event was not held.
NR / Non-Ranking Event	means an event is/was no longer a ranking event.
R / Ranking Event	means an event is/was a ranking event.
MR / Minor-Ranking Event	means an event is/was a minor-ranking event.

== Career finals ==
=== Ranking finals: 2 ===
Outcome	No.	Year	Championship	Opponent in the final	Score
Runner-up	1.	2006	Grand Prix	(Australia) Neil Robertson	5–9
Runner-up	2.	2007	China Open	(Scotland) Graeme Dott	5–9

=== Non-ranking finals: 3 (2 titles) ===
Outcome	No.	Year	Championship	Opponent in the final	Score
Winner	1.	2004	Challenge Tour - Event 1	(England) Chris Norbury	6–2
Winner	2.	2005	Challenge Tour - Event 4	(England) Matthew Couch	6–0
Runner-up	1.	2011	Hainan Classic	(Scotland) John Higgins	2–7

=== Pro-am finals: 8 (5 titles) ===
Outcome	No.	Year	Championship	Opponent in the final	Score
Runner-up	1.	2003	EASB Open Tour Event 4	(England) Ricky Walden	1–5
Winner	1.	2005	Pontins Spring Open	(England) Mike Finn	5–0
Winner	2.	2006	Pontins Pro-Am - Event 1	(Republic of Ireland) Ken Doherty	4–2
Runner-up	2.	2006	Pontins Autumn Open	(Wales) Ryan Day	2–5
Winner	3.	2007	Pontins Pro-Am - Event 4	(England) Ricky Walden	4–3
Winner	4.	2007	Pontins Autumn Open	(England) Lee Page	5–0
Runner-up	3.	2008	Austrian Open	(Wales) Ryan Day	3–6
Winner	5.	2008	Pontins World Series Grand Final	(England) Craig Steadman	4–1
