= Ira Smith (baseball) =

American baseball player

- Outfielder
- Born: August 4, 1967 (age 58); Chestertown, Maryland
- Bats: Right Throws: Right

Ira Lamonte Smith (born August 4, 1967) is an American former college and minor league baseball player from Chestertown, Maryland. While playing collegiately at University of Maryland Eastern Shore, Smith was the first player to win two NCAA batting titles as well as the first to win the award in consecutive seasons.

== College baseball ==
In 1989, Smith finished the season with a .488 batting average and was named team MVP. In 1990, Smith repeated the feat by batting .519, ranking the sixth all-time highest Division I batting average and again earning team MVP honors. Ira's career batting average of .431 ranks as the 14th highest in Division 1 history.

== Professional baseball ==
In the 1990 MLB draft the Los Angeles Dodgers selected Smith in the 37th round. In 14 years playing Minor league and Independent league baseball, Smith had a career .292 batting average. Despite several seasons in Triple-A, Smith did not appear in any games for a Major League Baseball team. In 1997, it was reported that the Detroit Tigers were grooming Smith to eventually become a coach or manager due to his relationship with Randy Smith, former General Manager of the San Diego Padres and then GM of the Tigers.

== Post career ==
In 2004, Smith was elected to the UMES Athletics Hall of Fame and in 2005 he was named to the Eastern Shore Baseball Hall of Fame. In 2010, Smith was elected to the Mid-Eastern Athletic Conference Hall of Fame. The NCAA announced in 2011 that Smith would be added to the ballot for the National College Baseball Hall of Fame.

Smith served as a bench coach for the Lincoln Saltdogs in 2004 and as the teams hitting coach in 2005. In 2006, Smith left the Saltdogs and took a position as the hitting coach of the Joliet Jackhammers.
