= 1990 du Maurier Classic =

Coordinates: 43.45242°N 80.536852°W

The 1990 du Maurier Classic was contested from June 28 to July 1 at Westmount Golf & Country Club. It was the 18th edition of the du Maurier Classic, and the 12th edition as a major championship on the LPGA Tour.

This event was won by Cathy Johnston-Forbes.

== Final leaderboard ==
Place	Player	Score	To par	Money (US$)
1	(United States) Cathy Johnston-Forbes	65-70-70-71=276	−16	90,000
2	(United States) Patty Sheehan	69-70-70-69=278	−14	55,500
3	(United States) Beth Daniel	74-66-71-70=281	−11	40,500
4	(Sweden) Liselotte Neumann	68-72-70-72=282	−10	31,500
5	(United States) Missie Berteotti	74-68-69-72=283	−9	25,500
T6	(United States) Jody Anschutz	70-72-70-72=284	−8	19,350
T6	(United States) Gina Hull	70-68-76-70=284	−8	19,350
T8	(United States) Pat Bradley	73-69-70-73=285	−7	14,850
T8	(United States) Patti Rizzo	67-69-73-76=285	−7	14,850
T10	(United States) Jane Geddes	72-67-74-73=286	−6	12,000
T10	(United States) Betsy King	70-72-70-74=286	−6	12,000
