= Cathy Johnston-Forbes =

American golfer (born 1963)

Personal information
- Full name: Cathy Johnston-Forbes
- Nationality: United States
- Born: December 16, 1963 (age 62) High Point, North Carolina, U.S.
- Height: 5 ft 6 in (1.68 m)

Career
- Sport: Golf
- College: University of North Carolina
- Status: Professional
- Former tour: LPGA Tour (1986–2006)
- Professional wins: 1

Number of wins by tour
- LPGA Tour: 1

Best results in LPGA major championships (wins: 1)
- Chevron Championship: T4: 2000
- Women's PGA C'ship: T8: 1993
- U.S. Women's Open: T19: 1996
- du Maurier Classic: Won: 1990
- Women's British Open: DNP

Cathy Johnston-Forbes (née Johnston; born December 16, 1963) is an American professional golfer.

She was born in High Point, North Carolina and attended the University of North Carolina.

== Professional career ==
Johnston's rookie season on the LPGA Tour was 1986. Her only victory on the tour came in 1990 at one of the LPGA majors, the du Maurier Classic. She had her best finish on the money list that same year, placing 21st.

In 1997, Johnston-Forbes tied for second in the Susan G. Komen International and posted her career low score of 64 during the second round of the Welch's/Circle K Championship. Along with her second-place finish in the Susan B. Komen International, she has posted two additional runner-up finishes on the LPGA tour. In 2000, she tied for fourth at the Nabisco Championship and crossed the $1 million mark in career earnings after the Giant Eagle LPGA Classic.

During her 23-year professional career, Johnston-Forbes has worked with some of the most respected golf instructors in the world. Her teachers have included Golf Magazine Top 100 Teachers Chuck Cook, Mike McGetrick, Tom Patri, and short game guru Dave Pelz. In addition, she has worked with five time Top Teachers in Pennsylvania award winner, Bob Kramer and Kirk Lucas, and longtime Carolinas PGA Section Professional, Jerry McGraw.

== Professional wins ==
=== LPGA Tour wins (1) ===
Legend
LPGA Tour major championships (1)
Other LPGA Tour (0)

No.	Date	Tournament	Winning score	Margin of victory	Runner-up
1	Jul 1, 1990	du Maurier Classic	−16 (65-70-70-71=276)	2 strokes	(United States) Patty Sheehan

== Major championships ==
=== Wins (1) ===
Year	Championship	Winning score	Margin	Runner-up
1990	du Maurier Classic	−16 (65-70-70-71=276)	2 strokes	(United States) Patty Sheehan

=== Results timeline ===
Tournament	1986	1987	1988	1989
Kraft Nabisco Championship		T69	CUT	T36
LPGA Championship	CUT	T46	T52	CUT
U.S. Women's Open				
du Maurier Classic	76	CUT	CUT	

Tournament	1990	1991	1992	1993	1994	1995	1996	1997	1998	1999	2000
Kraft Nabisco Championship		T60	CUT	CUT	CUT	T65	T41	CUT	CUT	T62	T4
LPGA Championship	T9	CUT	CUT	T8	T66	T61	T74	T75	T18	CUT	CUT
U.S. Women's Open		CUT		CUT	CUT	CUT	T19	CUT	CUT		
du Maurier Classic	1	CUT	CUT	CUT	T72	CUT	CUT	T52	T48	T59	CUT

Tournament	2001	2002	2003	2004	2005
Kraft Nabisco Championship	T48				
LPGA Championship	CUT	CUT			CUT
U.S. Women's Open				CUT	
Women's British Open ^					

^ The Women's British Open replaced the du Maurier Classic as an LPGA major in 2001.

Win
Top 10
Did not play

CUT = missed the half-way cut
"T" = tied

=== Summary ===
Tournament	Wins	2nd	3rd	Top-5	Top-10	Top-25	Events	Cuts made
Kraft Nabisco Championship	0	0	0	1	1	1	14	8
LPGA Championship	0	0	0	0	2	3	18	9
U.S. Women's Open	0	0	0	0	0	1	8	1
du Maurier Classic	1	0	0	1	1	1	14	6
Women's British Open	0	0	0	0	0	0	0	0
Totals	1	0	0	2	4	6	54	24

- Most consecutive cuts made – 3 (four times)
- Longest streak of top-10s – 2 (1990 du Maurier Classic – 1990 LPGA)
