= 1990 Prix de l'Arc de Triomphe =

Horse race at Longchamp, Paris, France

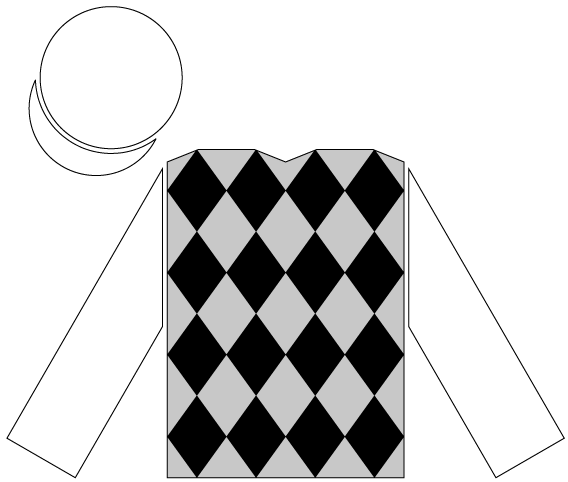
- Location: Longchamp Racecourse
- Date: October 7, 1990
- Winning horse: Saumarez

The 1990 Prix de l'Arc de Triomphe was a horse race held at Longchamp on Sunday 7 October 1990. It was the 69th running of the Prix de l'Arc de Triomphe.

The winner was Saumarez, a three-year-old colt trained in France by Nicolas Clément. The winning jockey was Gérald Mossé.

== Race details ==
- Sponsor: CIGA Hotels
- Purse: 8,500,000 F; First prize: 5,000,000 F
- Going: Good
- Distance: 2,400 metres
- Number of runners: 21
- Winner's time: 2m 29.8s

== Full result ==
Pos.	Marg.	Horse	Age	Jockey	Trainer (Country)
1		Saumarez	3	Gérald Mossé	Nicolas Clément (FR)
2	¾	Epervier Bleu	3	Dominique Boeuf	Élie Lellouche (FR)
3	½	Snurge	3	Richard Quinn	Paul Cole (GB)
4	2	In the Wings	4	Pat Eddery	André Fabre (FR)
5	1½	Belmez	3	Steve Cauthen	Henry Cecil (GB)
6	1	Legal Case	4	Frankie Dettori	Luca Cumani (GB)
7	snk	Erdelistan	3	Tony Cruz	Alain de Royer-Dupré (FR)
8	1	Hellenic	3	Walter Swinburn	Michael Stoute (GB)
9	2	In the Groove	3	Richard Fox	David Elsworth (GB)
10	shd	Salsabil	3	Willie Carson	John Dunlop (GB)
11	shd	Antisaar	3	Cash Asmussen	André Fabre (FR)
12	½	Assatis	5	Masato Shibata	Guy Harwood (GB)
13	nk	Robore	5	Alfred Gibert	Noël Pelat (FR)
14	¾	Charmer	5	Felix Coetzee	Clive Brittain (GB)
15	½	Mister Riv	5	Guy Guignard	Antonio Spanu (FR)
16	nk	Zartota	4	Thierry Jarnet	Antonio Spanu (FR)
17	¾	Guiza	3	Éric Legrix	Jacques-Charles Cunnington (FR)
18	1	Sikeston	4	Michael Roberts	Clive Brittain (GB)
19	8	Ile de Nisky	4	Gary Carter	Geoff Huffer (GB)
20	20	Albadr	5	Richard Hills	Robert Armstrong (GB)
21	dist	Abyad	3	William Mongil	Alain de Royer-Dupré (FR)

- Abbreviations: shd = short-head; snk = short-neck; nk = neck; dist = distance

== Winner's details ==
Further details of the winner, Saumarez.

- Sex: Colt
- Foaled: 28 March 1987
- Country: Great Britain
- Sire: Rainbow Quest; Dam: Fiesta Fun (Welsh Pageant)
- Owners: Bruce McNall and Wayne Gretzky
- Breeder: Elizabeth Longton
