= 2010 UK Championship =

2010 12BET.com UK Championship

Tournament information
- Dates: 4–12 December 2010
- Venue: Telford International Centre
- City: Telford
- Country: England
- Organisation: World Snooker
- Format: Ranking event
- Total prize fund: £625,000
- Winner's share: £100,000
- Highest break: Mark Joyce (ENG) (143)

Final
- Champion: John Higgins (SCO)
- Runner-up: Mark Williams (WAL)
- Score: 10–9

The 2010 UK Championship (officially the 2010 12BET.com UK Championship) was a professional ranking snooker tournament that took place between 4–12 December 2010 at the Telford International Centre in Telford, England.

Ding Junhui was the defending champion, but he lost 8–9 against Mark Allen in the last 16.

John Higgins won the title after defeating Mark Williams in the final frame of the final to clinch his third UK title. Higgins had trailed 5–9 and required a snooker in the seventeenth frame to remain in the match. With this win he regained the number one position in the rankings.

== Prize fund ==
The breakdown of prize money for this year is shown below:

- Winner: £100,000
- Runner-up: £46,000
- Semi-finals: £23,250
- Quarter-finals: £16,450
- Last 16: £12,050
- Last 32: £8,750
- Last 48: £5,500
- Last 64: £2,300
- Stage one highest break: £500
- Stage two highest break: £5,000
- Total: £625,000

== Main draw ==
Last 32; Best of 17 frames
1	Ding Junhui (CHN)	9
Matthew Stevens (WAL)	4
12	Mark Allen (NIR)	9
Tom Ford (ENG)	5
16	Marco Fu (HKG)	9
Barry Hawkins (ENG)	7
7	Ronnie O'Sullivan (ENG)	6
Stuart Bingham (ENG)	9
6	Stephen Maguire (SCO)	9
Ken Doherty (IRL)	6
9	Mark Selby (ENG)	9
Ricky Walden (ENG)	6
11	Graeme Dott (SCO)	9
Martin Gould (ENG)	5
4	John Higgins (SCO)	9
Stephen Lee (ENG)	6
3	Ali Carter (ENG)	6
Mark Joyce (ENG)	9
14	Jamie Cope (ENG)	6
Judd Trump (ENG)	9
10	Stephen Hendry (SCO)	9
Jimmy White (ENG)	8
5	Mark Williams (WAL)	9
Mark Davis (ENG)	3
8	Shaun Murphy (ENG)	9
Patrick Wallace (NIR)	5
15	Mark King (ENG)	8
Ryan Day (WAL)	9
13	Peter Ebdon (ENG)	7
Andrew Higginson (ENG)	9
2	Neil Robertson (AUS)	9
Rory McLeod (ENG)	1

Last 16; Best of 17 frames
1	(China) Ding Junhui	8
12	(Northern Ireland) Mark Allen	9
16	(Hong Kong) Marco Fu	2
(England) Stuart Bingham	9
6	(Scotland) Stephen Maguire	9
9	(England) Mark Selby	7
11	(Scotland) Graeme Dott	8
4	(Scotland) John Higgins	9
(England) Mark Joyce	9
(England) Judd Trump	7
10	(Scotland) Stephen Hendry	6
5	(Wales) Mark Williams	9
8	(England) Shaun Murphy	9
(Wales) Ryan Day	8
(England) Andrew Higginson	5
2	(Australia) Neil Robertson	9

Quarter-finals; Best of 17 frames
12	(Northern Ireland) Mark Allen	9
(England) Stuart Bingham	7
6	(Scotland) Stephen Maguire	7
4	(Scotland) John Higgins	9
(England) Mark Joyce	7
5	(Wales) Mark Williams	9
8	(England) Shaun Murphy	9
2	(Australia) Neil Robertson	7

Semi-finals; Best of 17 frames
12	(Northern Ireland) Mark Allen	5
4	(Scotland) John Higgins	9
5	(Wales) Mark Williams	9
8	(England) Shaun Murphy	8

Final; Best of 19 frames
4	(Scotland) John Higgins	10
5	(Wales) Mark Williams	9

== Final ==
Final: Best of 19 frames. Referee: Brendan Moore. Telford International Centre, Telford, England, 12 December 2010.
John Higgins (4); Scotland	10–9	Mark Williams (5); Wales
Afternoon: 0–88 (83), 78–1, 26–67, 45–65 (65), 66–60 (66, 55), 34–76, 17–66, 0–85 (85); Evening: 3–55, 90–0 (90), 94–43 (94), 45–85 (70), 135–0 (105), 16–63, 68–31, 110–0 (76), 71–69 (Williams 61), 64–28 (52), 81–46 (66)
105	Highest break	85
1	Century breaks	0
7	50+ breaks	6

== Qualifying ==
These matches were held between 23 November and 1 December 2010 at the World Snooker Academy, Sheffield, England.

Round 1 Best of 17 frames
Paul Davies (WAL)	9
Patrick Einsle (GER)	7
Liam Highfield (ENG)	9
Kuldesh Johal (ENG)	7
Jamie Jones (WAL)	9
Dermot McGlinchey (NIR)	4
Andrew Pagett (WAL)	9
Noppon Saengkham (THA)	2
Ben Woollaston (ENG)	9
Thanawat Thirapongpaiboon (THA)	2
Igor Figueiredo (BRA)	4
Liu Chuang (CHN)	9
James Wattana (THA)	9
Kurt Maflin (NOR)	4
David Gilbert (ENG)	9
Issara Kachaiwong (THA)	3
Mark Joyce (ENG)	9
Jak Jones (WAL)	7
Xiao Guodong (CHN)	9
Reanne Evans (ENG)	1
Joe Delaney (IRL)	3
Adam Wicheard (ENG)	9
James McBain (SCO)	8
Simon Bedford (ENG)	9
Patrick Wallace (NIR)	9
Jamie O'Neill (ENG)	4
Michael White (WAL)	9
Justin Astley (ENG)	6
Jack Lisowski (ENG)	9
Zhang Anda (CHN)	4
Kyren Wilson (ENG)	9
Paul Davison (ENG)	6

Round 2 Best of 17 frames
Matthew Couch (ENG)	9
(Wales) Paul Davies	8
Tony Drago (MLT)	9
(England) Liam Highfield	4
Joe Jogia (ENG)	6
(Wales) Jamie Jones	9
Peter Lines (ENG)	9
(Wales) Andrew Pagett	8
Rod Lawler (ENG)	9
(England) Ben Woollaston	3
Jimmy Michie (ENG)	5
(China) Liu Chuang	9
Jimmy Robertson (ENG)	6
(Thailand) James Wattana	9
Andy Hicks (ENG)	8
(England) David Gilbert	9
Alfie Burden (ENG)	7
(England) Mark Joyce	9
Michael Judge (IRL)	1
(China) Xiao Guodong	9
Jimmy White (ENG)	9
(England) Adam Wicheard	1
Bjorn Haneveer (BEL)	4
(England) Simon Bedford	9
Anthony McGill (SCO)	4
(Northern Ireland) Patrick Wallace	9
David Morris (IRL)	3
(Wales) Michael White	9
Matthew Selt (ENG)	9
(England) Jack Lisowski	8
Ian McCulloch (ENG)	8
(England) Kyren Wilson	9

Round 3 Best of 17 frames
Robert Milkins (ENG)	9
(England) Matthew Couch	4
Tom Ford (ENG)	9
(Malta) Tony Drago	6
Fergal O'Brien (IRL)	9
(Wales) Jamie Jones	4
Nigel Bond (ENG)	7
(England) Peter Lines	9
Anthony Hamilton (ENG)	3
(England) Rod Lawler	9
Alan McManus (SCO)	5
(China) Liu Chuang	9
Dave Harold (ENG)	4
(Thailand) James Wattana	9
Barry Pinches (ENG)	4
(England) David Gilbert	9
Marcus Campbell (SCO)	8
(England) Mark Joyce	9
Stuart Pettman (ENG)	5
(China) Xiao Guodong	9
Adrian Gunnell (ENG)	4
(England) Jimmy White	9
Joe Swail (NIR)	9
(England) Simon Bedford	2
Michael Holt (ENG)	4
(Northern Ireland) Patrick Wallace	9
Jamie Burnett (SCO)	9
(Wales) Michael White	6
Dominic Dale (WAL)	9
(England) Matthew Selt	6
Rory McLeod (ENG)	9
(England) Kyren Wilson	4

Round 4 Best of 17 frames
Matthew Stevens (WAL)	9
(England) Robert Milkins	5
Gerard Greene (NIR)	2
(England) Tom Ford	9
Barry Hawkins (ENG)	9
(Republic of Ireland) Fergal O'Brien	3
Stuart Bingham (ENG)	9
(England) Peter Lines	4
Ken Doherty (IRL)	9
(England) Rod Lawler	7
Ricky Walden (ENG)	9
(China) Liu Chuang	8
Martin Gould (ENG)	9
(Thailand) James Wattana	8
Stephen Lee (ENG)	9
(England) David Gilbert	4
Steve Davis (ENG)	2
(England) Mark Joyce	9
Judd Trump (ENG)	9
(China) Xiao Guodong	7
Joe Perry (ENG)	6
(England) Jimmy White	9
Mark Davis (ENG)	9
(Northern Ireland) Joe Swail	7
Mike Dunn (ENG)	1
(Northern Ireland) Patrick Wallace	9
Ryan Day (WAL)	9
(Scotland) Jamie Burnett	5
Andrew Higginson (ENG)	9
(Wales) Dominic Dale	6
Liang Wenbo (CHN)	6
(England) Rory McLeod	9

== Century breaks ==
=== Televised stage centuries ===
- 143, 109, 103, 100 – Mark Joyce
- 142, 106 – Stuart Bingham
- 142 – Jamie Cope
- 141, 130, 114, 113, 100 – Mark Allen
- 138, 100 – Marco Fu
- 137, 137, 135, 134, 127, 122, 106 – Stephen Maguire
- 137, 137 – Stephen Lee
- 137, 136, 126, 125, 120, 113, 105 – Neil Robertson
- 135, 131, 103, 101 – Ding Junhui
- 135 – Judd Trump
- 131, 129, 107, 101, 100 – Shaun Murphy
- 131 – Patrick Wallace
- 126 – Tom Ford
- 125 – Mark Davis
- 120, 104 – Ken Doherty
- 115 – Jimmy White
- 113 – Peter Ebdon
- 110, 107 – Andrew Higginson
- 109 – Mark Selby
- 105, 105, 100, 100 – John Higgins
- 104 – Stephen Hendry
- 103 – Matthew Stevens
- 100 – Graeme Dott
