= List of world number one snooker players =

Highest ranked snooker players

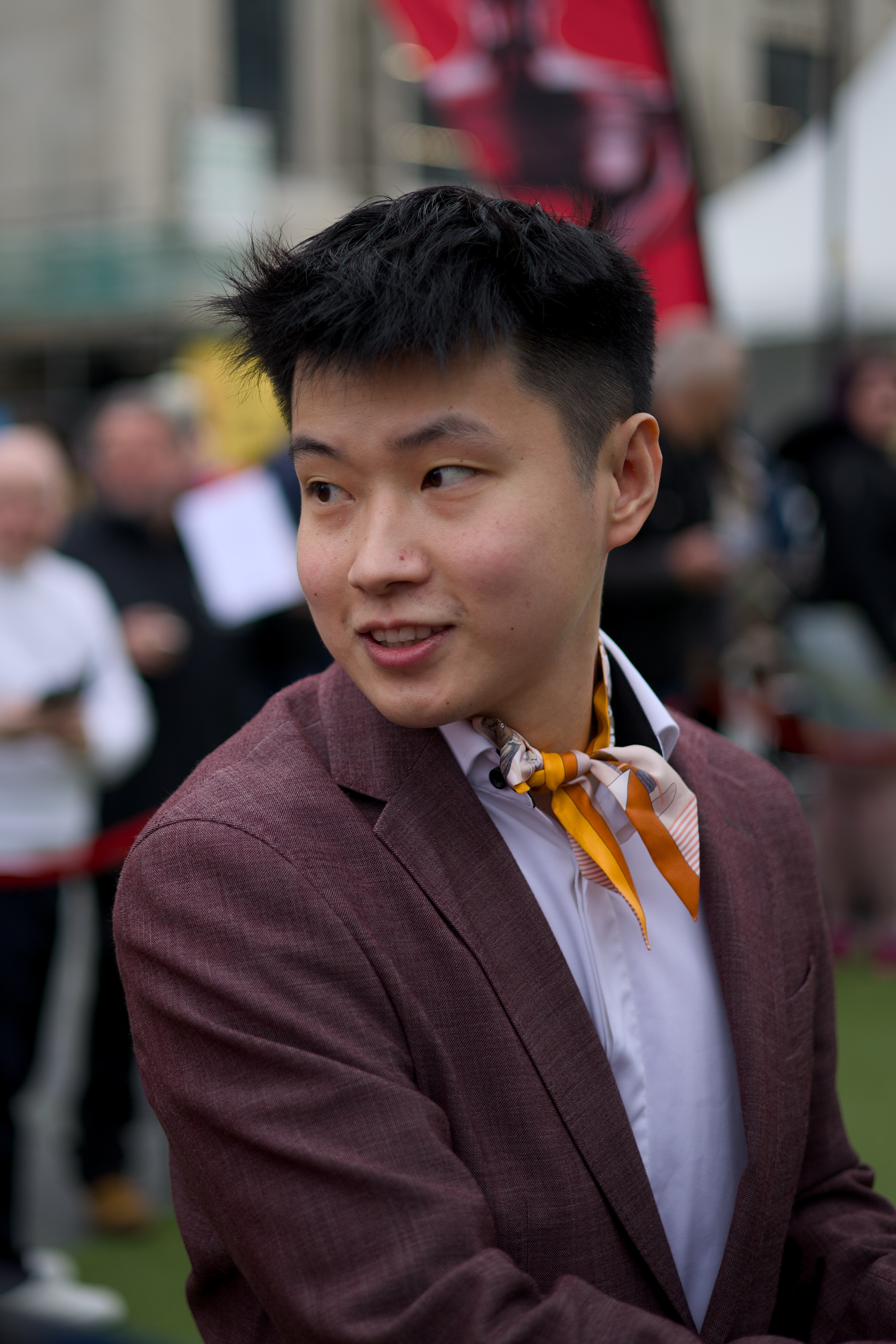
Zhao Xintong is the current world number one.

The sport of snooker has utilised a world rankings system since 1975, used to seed players on the World Snooker Tour for tournaments. Originally, rankings were published once a year at the conclusion of a season. Since 2010, however, the rankings were changed so that they would be updated after every ranking tournament.

The number one ranking has been held by thirteen players; Ray Reardon was the first to hold the position, and was followed by Cliff Thorburn, Steve Davis, Stephen Hendry, John Higgins, Mark Williams, Ronnie O'Sullivan, Neil Robertson, Mark Selby, Judd Trump, Ding Junhui and Mark Allen. The current world number one is Zhao Xintong.

Hendry held the number one position for the longest time under the annual format, holding it for nine years in total. Since it changed to a rolling format in 2010, Selby has held the rank longer than anyone else.

== History ==
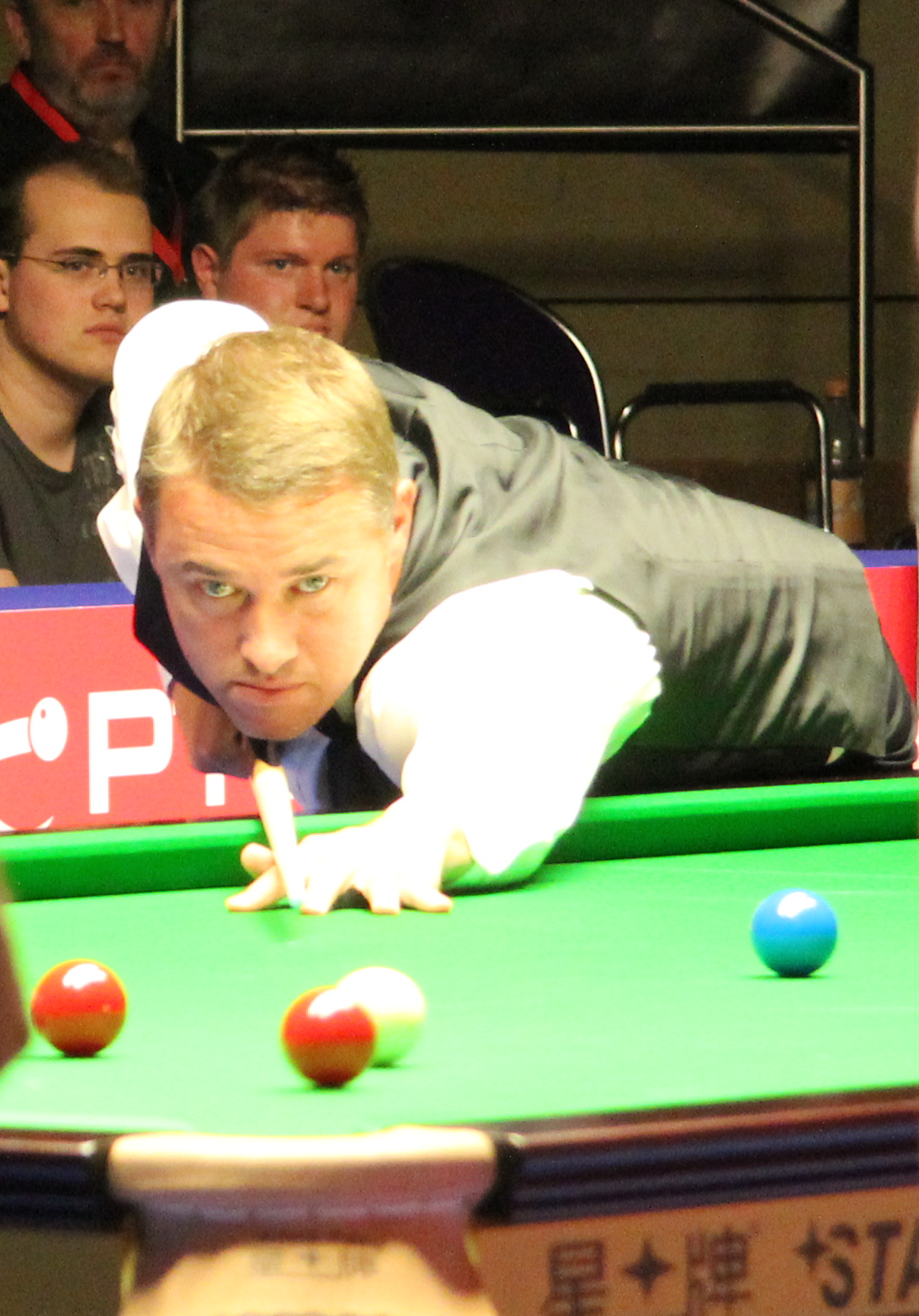
Stephen Hendry ended the season ranked at number one on nine occasions; more season finishes in the top spot than any other player.

The sport of professional snooker first adopted a ranking system for the 1975–76 season, which saw Ray Reardon ranked in the top position. An Order of Merit was published in the 1975/76 season to determine the seedings for events, and the first set of official rankings the following year used the same criteria. Certain events carried ranking points, and at the end of the season, they were tallied. The World Snooker Championship originally was the only event to offer ranking points, until the 1982 International Open. Over the next 22 seasons, five men held the first position; Reardon (1976/77 to 1980/81), Cliff Thorburn (1981/82), Reardon again for 1982/83 (Note: Alex Higgins would have been ranked number one in the 1982–83 season, but had ranking points deducted as a result of disciplinary action after assaulting a press officer.), Steve Davis (1983/84 to 1989/90) and Stephen Hendry (1990/91 to 1997/98). From 1998/99 to 2009/10, the title was shared by Ronnie O'Sullivan (five seasons), John Higgins (three seasons) and Mark Williams (three seasons), while Hendry regained the position for the 2006/07 season. In the first 34 years of the world rankings, only seven players held the number one position.

For the 2010–11 snooker season, the world rankings were changed to be updated after each tournament carrying ranking points. This was altered from the 2014–15 snooker season, where ranking points were based entirely on the prize money won from qualifying events. Since the introduction of the new system, Higgins, Neil Robertson, Williams, Mark Selby, Judd Trump, Ding Junhui, and O'Sullivan have all attained the number one rank. Selby has also seven seasons ranked in first place, putting him in joint third place overall with Reardon and Davis, O'Sullivan is in second with (eight times) and behind Hendry (nine times).

== List of players ==
Hendry holds the record for most seasons at number one under the traditional system, with nine seasons (1990/1991–1997/1998 and again in 2006–07). His first spell of eight consecutive seasons in this position is also a record. Under the rolling ranking format, Mark Selby holds both the total and consecutive records.

=== Periods ===
The snooker players ranked number one in the world are listed below for each period since the introduction of the ranking system.

Number one players
No.	Nationality	Player	From	To	Ref
1	Wales	Ray Reardon	3 May 1975	20 April 1981	
2	Canada	Cliff Thorburn	21 April 1981	16 May 1982	
	Wales	Ray Reardon (2)	17 May 1982	2 May 1983	
3	England	Steve Davis	3 May 1983	29 April 1990	
4	Scotland	Stephen Hendry	30 April 1990	4 May 1998	
5	Scotland	John Higgins	5 May 1998	1 May 2000	
6	Wales	Mark Williams	2 May 2000	6 May 2002	
7	England	Ronnie O'Sullivan	7 May 2002	5 May 2003	
	Wales	Mark Williams (2)	6 May 2003	3 May 2004	
	England	Ronnie O'Sullivan (2)	4 May 2004	1 May 2006	
	Scotland	Stephen Hendry (2)	2 May 2006	7 May 2007	
	Scotland	John Higgins (2)	8 May 2007	5 May 2008	
	England	Ronnie O'Sullivan (3)	6 May 2008	3 May 2010	
	Scotland	John Higgins (3)	4 May 2010	26 September 2010	
8	Australia	Neil Robertson	27 September 2010	12 December 2010	
	Scotland	John Higgins (4)	13 December 2010	2 May 2011	
	Wales	Mark Williams (3)	3 May 2011	11 September 2011	
9	England	Mark Selby	12 September 2011	4 November 2012	
10	England	Judd Trump	5 November 2012	9 December 2012	
	England	Mark Selby (2)	10 December 2012	17 February 2013	
	England	Judd Trump (2)	18 February 2013	31 March 2013	
	England	Mark Selby (3)	1 April 2013	9 June 2013	
	Australia	Neil Robertson (2)	10 June 2013	5 May 2014	
	England	Mark Selby (4)	6 May 2014	6 July 2014	
	Australia	Neil Robertson (3)	7 July 2014	10 August 2014	
	England	Mark Selby (5)	11 August 2014	7 December 2014	
11	China	Ding Junhui	8 December 2014	14 December 2014	
	Australia	Neil Robertson (4)	15 December 2014	25 January 2015	
	China	Ding Junhui (2)	26 January 2015	8 February 2015	
	England	Mark Selby (6)	9 February 2015	24 March 2019	
	England	Ronnie O'Sullivan (4)	25 March 2019	11 August 2019	
	England	Judd Trump (3)	12 August 2019	22 August 2021	
	England	Mark Selby (7)	23 August 2021	17 October 2021	
	England	Judd Trump (4)	18 October 2021	7 November 2021	
	England	Mark Selby (8)	8 November 2021	3 April 2022	
	England	Ronnie O'Sullivan (5)	4 April 2022	6 May 2024	
12	Northern Ireland	Mark Allen	7 May 2024	25 August 2024	
	England	Judd Trump (5)	26 August 2024	29 August 2026	
13	China	Zhao Xintong	30 August 2026	Present	

=== Total time spent at number one ===
==== Annual format (1975–2010) ====
Annual format
Years	Longest consecutive period	Nationality	Player
9	8	Scotland	Stephen Hendry
7	7	England	Steve Davis
7	6	Wales	Ray Reardon
5	2	England	Ronnie O'Sullivan
3	2	Wales	Mark Williams
3	2	Scotland	John Higgins
1	1	Canada	Cliff Thorburn

==== Rolling format (2010–present) ====
Rolling format
Days	Longest consecutive period	Nationality	Player
2449	1505	England	Mark Selby
1574	742	England	Judd Trump
904	764	England	Ronnie O'Sullivan
484	330	Australia	Neil Robertson
287	146	Scotland	John Higgins
132	132	Wales	Mark Williams
111	111	Northern Ireland	Mark Allen
52 †	52 †	China	Zhao Xintong
21	14	China	Ding Junhui

† as of 20 October 2026

=== Players ranked number one at the start of the season ===
==== Per season ====
Seasons held
Season	Nationality	Player
1975–1976	Wales	Ray Reardon (1)
1976–1977	Wales	Ray Reardon
1977–1978	Wales	Ray Reardon
1978–1979	Wales	Ray Reardon
1979–1980	Wales	Ray Reardon
1980–1981	Wales	Ray Reardon
1981–1982	Canada	Cliff Thorburn (2)
1982–1983	Wales	Ray Reardon
1983–1984	England	Steve Davis (3)
1984–1985	England	Steve Davis
1985–1986	England	Steve Davis
1986–1987	England	Steve Davis
1987–1988	England	Steve Davis
1988–1989	England	Steve Davis
1989–1990	England	Steve Davis
1990–1991	Scotland	Stephen Hendry (4)
1991–1992	Scotland	Stephen Hendry
1992–1993	Scotland	Stephen Hendry
1993–1994	Scotland	Stephen Hendry
1994–1995	Scotland	Stephen Hendry
1995–1996	Scotland	Stephen Hendry
1996–1997	Scotland	Stephen Hendry
1997–1998	Scotland	Stephen Hendry
1998–1999	Scotland	John Higgins (5)
1999–2000	Scotland	John Higgins
2000–2001	Wales	Mark Williams (6)
2001–2002	Wales	Mark Williams
2002–2003	England	Ronnie O'Sullivan (7)
2003–2004	Wales	Mark Williams
2004–2005	England	Ronnie O'Sullivan
2005–2006	England	Ronnie O'Sullivan
2006–2007	Scotland	Stephen Hendry
2007–2008	Scotland	John Higgins
2008–2009	England	Ronnie O'Sullivan
2009–2010	England	Ronnie O'Sullivan
2010–2011	Scotland	John Higgins
2011–2012	Wales	Mark Williams
2012–2013	England	Mark Selby (8)
2013–2014	England	Mark Selby
2014–2015	England	Mark Selby
2015–2016	England	Mark Selby
2016–2017	England	Mark Selby
2017–2018	England	Mark Selby
2018–2019	England	Mark Selby
2019–2020	England	Ronnie O'Sullivan
2020–2021	England	Judd Trump (9)
2021–2022	England	Judd Trump
2022–2023	England	Ronnie O'Sullivan
2023–2024	England	Ronnie O'Sullivan
2024–2025	Northern Ireland	Mark Allen (10)
2025–2026	England	Judd Trump
2026–2027	England	Judd Trump

==== Per frequency ====
Number of times held
Seasons	Longest consecutive period	Nationality	Player
9	8	Scotland	Stephen Hendry
8	2	England	Ronnie O'Sullivan
7	7	England	Steve Davis
7	7	England	Mark Selby
7	6	Wales	Ray Reardon
4	2	Scotland	John Higgins
4	2	Wales	Mark Williams
4	2	England	Judd Trump
1	1	Canada	Cliff Thorburn
1	1	Northern Ireland	Mark Allen
