= Mathew Ragg =

New Zealand strongman (born 1991)

Personal information
- Nationality: New Zealand
- Born: 21 September 1991 (age 34) New Zealand
- Occupation: Strongman
- Height: 6 ft 2 in (1.88 m)
- Weight: 155–160 kg (342–353 lb)
Medal record
Strongman
Representing New Zealand
World's Strongest Man
9th	2023 World's Strongest Man
4th	2024 World's Strongest Man
Qualified	2025 World's Strongest Man
7th	2026 World's Strongest Man
Shaw Classic
12th	2024 Strongest Man on Earth
Rogue Invitational
7th	2024 Rogue Invitational
Giants Live
2nd	2023 World Tour Finals
4th	2024 Strongman Classic
6th	2024 US Strongman Championship
3rd	2025 World Open
8th	2026 Strongman Classic
Official Strongman Games
3rd	2022 Official Strongman Games
Arnold Pro Strongman World Series
3rd	2016 Arnold Amateur
7th	2017 Arnold Australia
8th	2018 Arnold Australia
Beasts of Burden
1st	2024 Beasts of Burden
New Zealand's Strongest Man
2nd	2014 New Zealand's Strongest Man
1st	2015 New Zealand's Strongest Man
1st	2016 New Zealand's Strongest Man
1st	2017 New Zealand's Strongest Man
3rd	2019 New Zealand's Strongest Man
1st	2020 New Zealand's Strongest Man
1st	2022 New Zealand's Strongest Man
1st	2023 New Zealand's Strongest Man
1st	2025 New Zealand's Strongest Man

Mathew 'Mat' Ragg (born 21 September 1991) is a Strongman from New Zealand. He is the Oceanian deadlift record holder and a seven-times winner of New Zealand's Strongest Man competition.

== Background ==
Ragg started his sporting career as a sprinter but a recurring shin injury caused him to move towards weight training. In 2013, he started competing in local strongman competitions and broke some national records in the process. This paved him to join 2016 Arnold Amateur World Championships, where he secured third place behind Zach Hadge and Evgeny Markov, resulting in his pro debut.

Following a hiatus due to COVID-19 pandemic, Ragg competed at 2022 Official Strongman Games and won third place which qualified him for the World's Strongest Man. At 2023 World's Strongest Man, he qualified for the finals, finishing in 9th place. At the 2023 Giants Live World Tour Finals, he won second place behind Tom Stoltman and ahead of the reigning World's Strongest Man champion Mitchell Hooper.

In 2024, he won the Beasts of Burden competition by scoring 41 of a possible 45 points. Ragg found further success in the 2024 season, coming fourth place at the 2024 World's Strongest Man and Giants Live Strongman Classic. He was also invited to compete in the 2024 Strongest Man on Earth competition (coming 12th out of 16) and the 2024 Rogue Invitational (coming 7th out of 10).

== Personal life ==
Ragg is of Samoan descent. He works full time as a shift supervisor at McDonald's.

== Personal records ==
- Deadlift (Equipped with straps) – 460 kg (1,014 lb) (2024 Trans Tasman Strongman Championship at Meatstock)
- Deadlift (Raw) – 431 kg (950 lb) (2024 Rogue Invitational)
- Log press – 191 kg (421 lb) (2026 World's Strongest Man)
- Axle press – 170 kg (375 lb) (2024 Giants Live Strongman Classic and 2024 World's Strongest Man)
- Circus Dumbbell press – 125 kg (276 lb) (2023 World's Strongest Man)
- Viking press – 240 kg (529 lb) (2023 New Zealand's Strongest Man) (World Record)
- Keg toss – 15 kg (33 lb) over 7.32 metres (24 ft 0 in) (2024 Strongest Man on Earth)

Training:

- Squat (Raw with wraps) – 320 kg (705 lb) x 5 reps
- Log press – 200 kg (441 lb)
- Axle press – 180 kg (397 lb)
- Manhood Stone (Max Atlas Stone) – 220 kg (485 lb) over 4 ft bar

== Competitive record ==
Winning percentage: 6.25%
Podium percentage: 31.25%

	1st	2nd	3rd	Podium	4th	5th	6th	7th	8th	9th	10th	11th	12th	22nd	Total
International competitions	1	1	3	5	2	0	1	3	2	1	0	0	1	1	16

== Filmography ==
=== Television ===
Year	Title	Role	Notes
2023–2026	World's Strongest Man	Himself – Competitor	
