= Evans Aryee =

Ghanaian strongman

Evans Nana Ekow Aryee
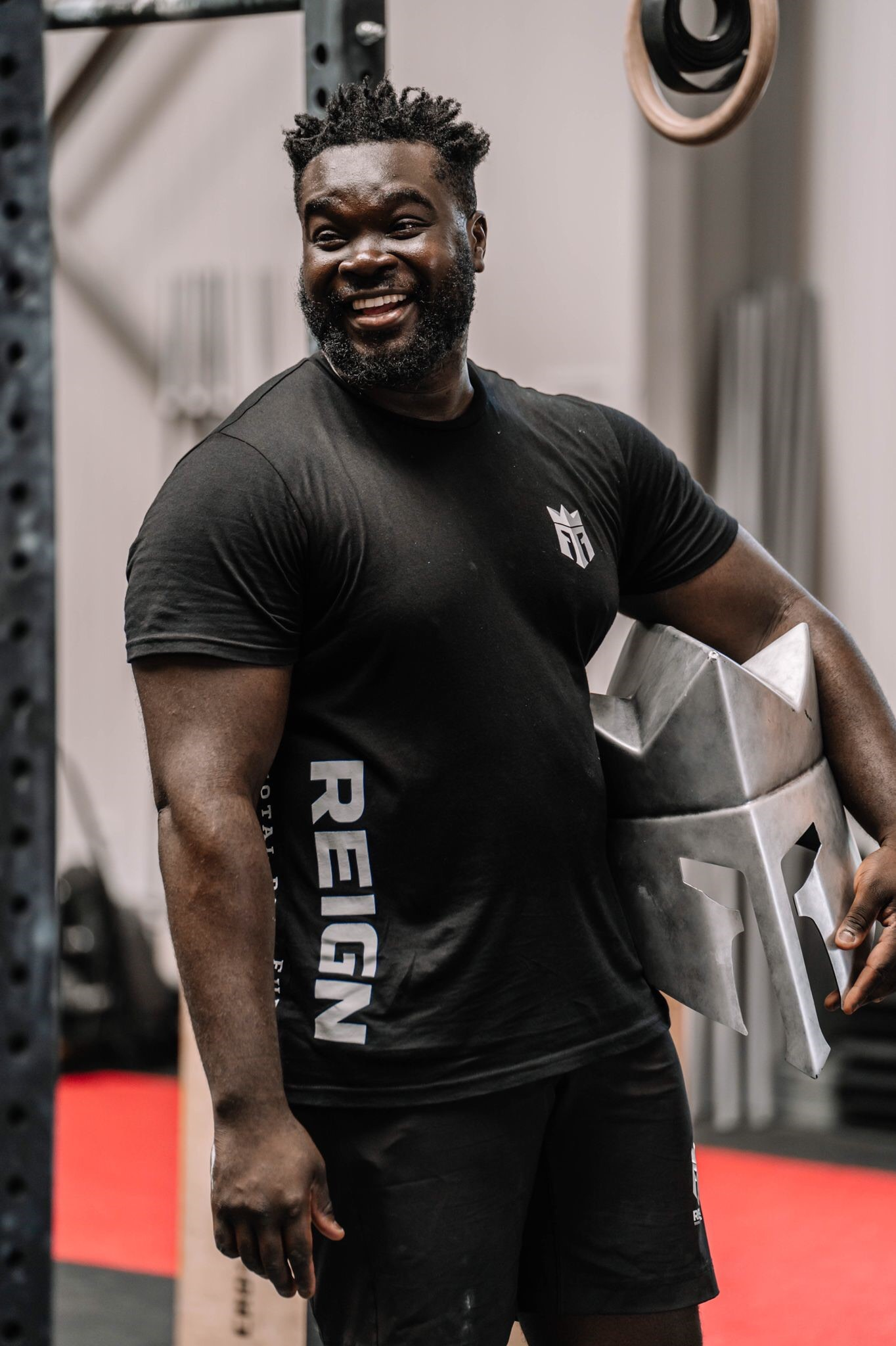

Personal information
- Full name: Evans Nana Ekow Aryee
- Nickname: Evans the Hulk
- Born: 2 April 1998 (age 28) Ghana
- Height: 6 ft 1 in (1.85 m)
- Weight: 132–137 kg (291–302 lb)

Sport
- Sport: Strongman and Powerlifting
Medal record
Strongman
Representing Ghana
World's Strongest Man
Qualified	2024 World's Strongest Man
Qualified	2025 World's Strongest Man
Qualified	2026 World's Strongest Man
Giants Live
7th	2023 World Open
12th	2023 World Tour Finals
5th	2024 World Tour Finals
4th	2025 World Tour Finals
2nd	2026 Strongman Open
8th	2026 World Tour Finals
Strongman Champions League
6th	2022 SCL Romania
6th	2022 SCL Gibraltar
11th	2022 SCL World Finals
8th	2023 SCL Finland
6th	2023 SCL Serbia
6th	2023 SCL Holland
5th	2023 SCL Record Breakers
1st	2023 SCL Portugal
5th	2023 SCL England
6th	2023 SCL Poland
3rd	2023 SCL Cyprus
6th	2023 SCL World Finals
5th	2024 SCL Martinique
3rd	2024 SCL Serbia
4th	2024 SCL Holland
3rd	2024 SCL Record Breakers
5th	2024 SCL Estonia
1st	2024 SCL Portugal
6th	2024 SCL Poland
2nd	2024 SCL Dubai
2nd	2024 SCL Africa
2nd	2024 SCL World Finals
1st	2025 SCL Serbia
4th	2025 SCL Italy
6th	2025 SCL Holland
4th	2025 SCL World's Strongest Viking
3rd	2025 SCL World Truck Pull Championship
2nd	2025 SCL Hungary
12th	2025 SCL USA
5th	2025 SCL World Finals
2nd	2026 SCL Serbia
2nd	2026 SCL Czech Republic
3rd	2026 SCL Holland
1st	2026 SCL Italy
2nd	2026 SCL Ireland
5th	2026 SCL Florida
2nd	2026 SCL World Finals
Magnús Ver Magnússon Strongman Classic
8th	2024 MVM Strongman Classic
Iceland's Strongest Man
3rd	2025 Iceland's Strongest Man

Evans Nana Ekow Aryee (born 2 April 1998) is a French-Ghanaian strongman and powerlifter based in Belgium.

== Early life ==
Aryee was enthusiastic about sports at a very young age. He loved performing bicep curls and later developed a passion towards squatting. He attended Adisadel College in Cape Coast and completed a bachelor's degree in Finance and Economics.

== Career ==
Aryee started training in 2016 and discovered strongman by 2020. He first entered 2021 Nieuwegein’s Strongest competition and then placed second in 2022 Strongest Man in East Flanders competition in Belgium. In his first international competition, he placed seventh at the 2022 FIBO Strongman ClassX in Germany. In IPF Belgisch Kampioenschap powerlifting championships, Aryee totaled 857.5 kg (1,890 lb) raw.

Aryee got selected for the Strongman Champions League in June 2022, and started competing prolifically, doing 2022 SCL Romania, 2022 SCL Gibraltar, 2023 SCL Finland, 2023 SCL Serbia, and 2023 SCL Holland. By the time of 2023 Central European Strongman Cup, he managed his first international podium and won 2023 SCL Portugal by defeating the likes of Kane Francis and Gavin Bilton to claim his first international strongman victory. He also podiumed in 2023 SCL Cyprus, 2024 SCL Serbia and 2024 SCL World Record Breakers in Finland.

In 2024, Aryee won SCL Portugal held in Esposende, Portugal for the second year and emerged runner-up to Hafþór Júlíus Björnsson at the 2024 SCL Dubai. He also secured second place in 2024 SCL Africa, 2024 SCL World Finals in Turkey and won 2025 SCL Serbia held in Zrenjanin, Serbia. He finished level on points with Aivars Šmaukstelis but took the title on countback.

Aryee made his first appearance at World's Strongest Man in 2024, finishing fifth in a group involving Pavlo Kordiyaka, Evan Singleton, Rauno Heinla, Marcus Crowder and Kane Francis. He won the car walk event during that heat. He also competed in 2025, finishing fourth in a group that was won by eventual World's Strongest Man winner Rayno Nel and also included Mateusz Kieliszkowski, Lucas Hatton and Shane Flowers.

Aryee competed at the 2024 Magnús Ver Magnússon Strongman Classic in Iceland and was invited to the 2025 Iceland's Strongest Man competition where he won third place behind the twelve-times champion Hafþór Júlíus Björnsson and Paddy Haynes. He also participated at the World Deadlift Championships in 2023 where he deadlifted 400 kg (882 lb) and the World Log Lift Championships in 2023 and 2025, pressing 170 kg (375 lb) and 180 kg (397 lb) respectively.

In September 2026, Aryee achieved his first Giants Live podium as he placed 2nd at the Strongman Open event in Birmingham. With that, he secured a spot at a fourth successive World's Strongest Man in 2027.

Having competed in 56 international strongman competitions across many locations around the world, Aryee has 4 international wins and 20 international podiums to his credit. He also holds three Guinness World Records.

== Personal records ==
Strongman

- Deadlift – 453.5 kg (1,000 lb) (2026 World Deadlift Championships) (National Record)
- Elevated 18-inch Deadlift – 440 kg (970 lb) (2024 SCL Africa)
- Log lift – 185 kg (408 lb) (2026 SCL Czech Republic) (National Record)
- Log lift (for reps) – 150 kg (331 lb) x 6 reps (2024 SCL Dubai), 140 kg (309 lb) x 7 reps (2025 World's Strongest Viking)
- Axle press – 165 kg (364 lb) (2023 European Giants)
- Atlas Stones run (heavy set) – 120–200 kg (265–441 lb) 37.72 seconds (2024 SCL Holland)
- Atlas Stones run (light set) – 100–180 kg (220–397 lb) 23.42 seconds (2023 SCL England)
- Húsafell Stone carry (around the pen) – 186 kg (410 lb) for 50.50 metres (165 ft 8 in) (around 1.5 revolutions) (2025 Iceland's Strongest Man)
- Farmer's walk (raw grip) – 160 kg (353 lb) in each hand for 39.08 metres (128 ft 3 in) (2025 Iceland's Strongest Man) (World Record)

Powerlifting

- Squat – 317.5 kg (700 lb)
- Bench press – 200 kg (441 lb)
- Deadlift – 340 kg (750 lb)
- Total – 857.5 kg (1,890 lb) (2022 KBGV Belgisch Kampioenschap/ Classic - Open)

In training:

- Squat – 350 kg (772 lb)
- Squat (for reps) – 300 kg (661 lb) x 5 reps
