= 2026 World's Strongest Man =

Strongman competition in 2026

Competition information
- Dates: 23-26 April 2026
- Location: Myrtle Beach, South Carolina
- Country: United States
- Athletes participating: 25
- Nations participating: 11

Champion(s)
- (Canada) Mitchell Hooper

The 2026 World's Strongest Man was officially the 49th World's Strongest Man competition and it took place in Myrtle Beach, South Carolina with it being held from 23 to 26 April 2026.

== Participants ==
- Ben Glasscock (GBR)
- Nick Guardione (USA)
- Rayno Nel (RSA)
- Tristain Hoath (CAN)
- Luke Richardson (GBR)
- Austin Andrade (MEX)
- Mathew Ragg (NZL)
- Jaco Schoonwinkel (RSA)
- Tom Stoltman (GBR)
- Levi Strong (USA)
- Matyáš Funiok (CZE)
- Lucas Hatton (USA)
- Paddy Haynes (GBR)
- Mitchell Hooper (CAN)
- Eddie Williams (AUS)
- Adam Bishop (GBR)
- Ondřej Fojtů (CZE)
- James Jeffers (CAN)
- Bryce Johnson (USA)
- Martins Licis (LAT)
- Andrew Flynn (GBR)
- Pavlo Kordiyaka (UKR)
- Trey Mitchell (USA)
- Evans Aryee (GHA)
- Evan Singleton (USA)

== Heats results ==
The qualifying took place on 23 and 24 April 2026.

=== Events ===
- Carry & climb: 140 kilograms (310 lb) farmers walk over 33 metres (108 ft) in to 225 kilograms (496 lb) power stairs for 9 steps. 1 minute 15 second time limit.
- Circus press medley: 80 kilograms (180 lb) dumbbell, 90 kilograms (200 lb) dumbbell, 100 kilograms (220 lb) dumbbell and then 159 kilograms (351 lb) barbell for repetitions. 1 minute 15 second time limit.
- Squat lift: 318 kilograms (701 lb). 1 minute 15 second time limit.
- Truck pull: 29,000 kilograms (64,000 lb) over 25 metres (82 ft). 1 minute time limit.
- Natural stone medley: 158 kilograms (348 lb) stone to shoulder, 177 kilograms (390 lb) stone carry for 16 metres (52 ft), 136 kilograms (300 lb) + 113 kilograms (249 lb) Webster stone walk for 8 metres (26 ft) and then a 182 kilograms (401 lb) stone load. 2 minute time limit.

=== Heat 1 ===
#	Athlete	Event 1 Carry & climb	Event 2 Circus press medley	Event 3 Squat lift	Event 4 Truck pull	Event 5 Natural stone medley	Pts
1	(Republic of Ireland) Leo Hyland	1st - 9 in 37.06	4th - 4 in 26.11	2nd - 13	1st - 35.03	1st - 4 in 43.70	21
2	(United States) Nick Guardione	2nd - 9 in 43.91	2nd - 5 in 44.50	5th - 6	2nd - 37.69	2nd - 4 in 1:14.34	17
3	(United Kingdom) Luke Richardson	4th - 9 in 1:00.34	3rd - 5 in 53.29	1st - 16	3rd - 38.91	5th - 2 + 6.10 m	14
4	(United Kingdom) Ben Glasscock	5th - 9 in 1:05.68	1st - 6 in 1:02.78	3rd - 10	4th - 42.06	4th - 4 in 1:47.82	13
5	(Canada) Tristain Hoath	3rd - 9 in 46.78	5th - 2 in 16.84	4th - 7	5th - 43.00	3rd - 4 in 1:20.25	10

=== Heat 2 ===
#	Athlete	Event 1 Carry & climb	Event 2 Circus press medley	Event 3 Squat lift	Event 4 Truck pull	Event 5 Natural stone medley	Pts
1	(Mexico) Austin Andrade	4th - 9 in 53.85	1st - 6 in 59.33	1st - 16	1st - 34.69	2nd - 4 in 1:41.41	21
2	(New Zealand) Mathew Ragg	1st - 9 in 38.29	3rd - 5 in 1:01.15	2nd - 15	5th - 38.69	3rd - 3 in 1:22.35	15
3	(South Africa) Jaco Schoonwinkel	2nd - 9 in 38.80	5th - 3 in 42.16	4th - 10	4th - 37.94	1st - 4 in 1:00.65	14
4	(United Kingdom) Tom Stoltman	5th - 9 in 1:10.21	2nd - 5 in 50.76	3rd - 12	3rd - 37.59	3rd - 3 in 50.16	14
5	(United States) Levi Strong	3rd - 9 in 51.84	4th - 4 in 1:10.35	5th - 5	2nd - 34.84	5th - 3 in 1:40.73	11

=== Heat 3 ===
#	Athlete	Event 1 Carry & climb	Event 2 Circus press medley	Event 3 Squat lift	Event 4 Truck pull	Event 5 Natural stone medley	Pts
1	(Canada) Mitchell Hooper	2nd - 9 in 39.64	2nd - 7 in 58.47	2nd - 12	1st - 33.02	1st - 4 in 52.81	22
2	(Australia) Eddie Williams	1st - 9 in 37.88	3rd - 5 in 55.47	3rd - 11	4th - 36.50	2nd - 4 in 55.03	17
3	(United States) Lucas Hatton	5th - 9 in 50.16	1st - 8 in 1:14.60	1st - 17	3rd - 35.25	5th - 1 in 27.50	15
4	(Czech Republic) Matyáš Funiok	4th - 9 in 47.58	4th - 5 in 1:01.38	4th - 7	2nd - 35.22	3rd - 4 in 58.81	13
5	(United Kingdom) Paddy Haynes	3rd - 9 in 46.21	5th - 5 in 1:10.15	5th - 6	5th - 38.34	4th - 4 in 1:07.81	8

=== Heat 4 ===
#	Athlete	Event 1 Carry & climb	Event 2 Circus press medley	Event 3 Squat lift	Event 4 Truck pull	Event 5 Natural stone medley	Pts
1	(Czech Republic) Ondřej Fojtů	1st - 9 in 38.22	1st - 8 in 1:04.87	2nd - 10	2nd - 37.94	1st - 4 in 1:20.83	23
2	(Latvia) Martins Licis	5th - 9 in 46.08	2nd - 6 in 1:03.21	1st - 14	1st - 36.09	2nd - 4 in 1:32.22	19
3	(Canada) James Jeffers	3rd - 9 in 43.91	4th - 4 in 44.52	4th - 8	3rd - 38.28	3rd - 3 in 1:24.67	13
4	(United States) Bryce Johnson	2nd - 9 in 41.53	3rd - 4 in 40.97	3rd - 9	N/A		10
5	(Netherlands) Kevin Hazeleger	4th - 9 in 45.78	5th - 3 in 29.97	5th - 2	N/A		4

=== Heat 5 ===
#	Athlete	Event 1 Carry & climb	Event 2 Circus press medley	Event 3 Squat lift	Event 4 Truck pull	Event 5 Natural stone medley	Pts
1	(Ukraine) Pavlo Kordiyaka	4th - 6 in 1:14.05	3rd - 6 in 59.85	2nd - 14	2nd - 37.66	1st - 4 in 1:07.00	18
2	(United States) Trey Mitchell	5th - 22 m	1st - 8 in 1:11.72	1st - 15	3rd - 39.03	2nd - 4 in 1:12.75	18
3	(United Kingdom) Andrew Flynn	2nd - 9 in 51.95	4th - 6 in 1:03.56	3rd - 12	1st - 35.78	3rd - 4 in 1:37.66	16.5
4	(United States) Evan Singleton	1st - 9 in 38.58	2nd - 7 in 1:13.61	5th - 8	5th - 39.97	4th - 1 + 13.40 m	13
5	(Ghana) Evans Aryee	3rd - 9 in 54.62	5th - 4 in 1:09.36	3rd - 12	4th - 39.16	N/A - 0 in 2:00.00	8.5

=== Finalist points table ===
Once the 10 finalists were confirmed, their results across all of the events were then compared to create a brand new leaderboard and it award 10 points through to 1.

#	Athlete	Nation	Points
1	Mitchell Hooper	Canada	10
2	Rayno Nel	South Africa	9
3	Austin Andrade	Mexico	8
4	Eddie Williams	Australia	7
5	Ondřej Fojtů	Czech Republic	6
6	Pavlo Kordiyaka	Ukraine	5
7	Martins Licis	Latvia	4
8	Trey Mitchell	United States	3
9	Mathew Ragg	New Zealand	2
10	Nick Guardione	United States	1

== Finals events results ==
The finals will take place on 25 and 26 April.

=== Event 1: Monster box flip & carry ===
- 520 kg (1,146 lb) box flip for 4 flips into a 454 kilograms (1,001 lb) yoke for 20 metres (66 ft).
- Time limit: 1 minute

#	Athlete	Nation	Time	Event Points	Overall Points
1	Rayno Nel	South Africa	27.30	10	19
2	Mitchell Hooper	Canada	27.44	9	19
3	Pavlo Kordiyaka	Ukraine	33.80	8	13
4	Eddie Williams	Australia	34.74	7	14
5	Ondřej Fojtů	Czech Republic	36.13	6	12
6	Mathew Ragg	New Zealand	37.24	5	7
7	Martins Licis	Latvia	39.31	4	8
8	Trey Mitchell	United States	40.43	3	6
9	Austin Andrade	Mexico	40.57	2	10
10	Nick Guardione	United States	43.86	1	2

=== Event 2: Deadlift ===
- Choice of 360 kg (794 lb) or 400 kg (882 lb) for max repetitions. 1 rep of heavier bar outscores any number of repetitions of lighter bar.
- Time limit: 1 minute 15 seconds

#	Athlete	Nation	Repetitions	Event Points	Overall Points
1	Rayno Nel	South Africa	5 × 400 kg	10	29
2	Mitchell Hooper	Canada	4 × 400 kg + 1 × 360 kg	8.5	27.5
2	Mathew Ragg	New Zealand	4 × 400 kg + 1 × 360 kg	8.5	15.5
4	Eddie Williams	Australia	3 × 400 kg + 1 × 360 kg	7	21
5	Martins Licis	Latvia	3 × 400 kg	5.5	13.5
5	Trey Mitchell	United States	3 × 400 kg	5.5	11.5
7	Ondřej Fojtů	Czech Republic	2 × 400 kg + 1 × 360 kg	4	16
8	Austin Andrade	Mexico	1 × 400 kg	2.5	12.5
8	Nick Guardione	United States	1 × 400 kg	2.5	4.5
—	Pavlo Kordiyaka	Ukraine	No lift	0	13

=== Event 3: Titan's toss ===
- 10 bags weighing 14 kilograms (31 lb) over a 3.65 metres (12.0 ft) bar with 2 from 7 metres (23 ft), 2 from 8 metres (26 ft), 2 from 9 metres (30 ft), 2 from 10 metres (33 ft) and 1 from both 11 metres (36 ft) and 12 metres (39 ft).
- Time limit: 1 minute

#	Athlete	Nation	Time	Event Points	Overall Points
1	Rayno Nel	South Africa	9 in 39.23	10	39
2	Mitchell Hooper	Canada	8 in 35.00	9	36.5
3	Nick Guardione	United States	8 in 43.09	8	12.5
4	Pavlo Kordiyaka	Ukraine	6 in 21.78	7	20
5	Mathew Ragg	New Zealand	6 in 23.10	6	21.5
6	Martins Licis	Latvia	6 in 26.78	5	18
7	Trey Mitchell	United States	6 in 28.44	4	16
8	Eddie Williams	Australia	6 in 33.94	3	24
9	Ondřej Fojtů	Czech Republic	3 in 17.84	2	18

=== Event 4: Max log lift ===
#	Athlete	Nation	Weight	Event Points	Overall Points
1	Trey Mitchell	United States	213 kg (470 lbs)	10	26
2	Mitchell Hooper	Canada	209 kg (461 lbs)	8.5	45
2	Ondřej Fojtů	Czech Republic	209 kg (461 lbs)	8.5	26.5
4	Rayno Nel	South Africa	200 kg (441 lbs)	7	46
5	Pavlo Kordiyaka	Ukraine	191 kg (421 lbs)	4.5	24.5
5	Martins Licis	Latvia	191 kg (421 lbs)	4.5	22.5
5	Mathew Ragg	New Zealand	191 kg (421 lbs)	4.5	26
5	Nick Guardione	United States	191 kg (421 lbs)	4.5	17
9	Eddie Williams	Australia	No lift	0	24

=== Event 5: Atlas stones ===
- Weight: 5 stones ranging from 140–210 kilograms (310–460 lb)
- Time Limit: 1 minute

#	Athlete	Nation	Time	Event Points	Overall Points
1	Trey Mitchell	United States	5 in 42.10	10	36
2	Mitchell Hooper	Canada	4 in 28.67	9	54
3	Martins Licis	Latvia	4 in 29.71	8	30.5
4	Pavlo Kordiyaka	Ukraine	4 in 32.70	7	31.5
5	Rayno Nel	South Africa	4 in 35.01	6	52
6	Ondřej Fojtů	Czech Republic	4 in 42.07	5	31.5
7	Nick Guardione	United States	3 in 22.15	4	21
8	Mathew Ragg	New Zealand	3 in 30.60	3	29
9	Eddie Williams	Australia	3 in 32.39	2	26

== Final results ==
#	Athlete	Nation	Points
1st place, gold medalist(s)	Mitchell Hooper	Canada	54
2nd place, silver medalist(s)	Rayno Nel	South Africa	52
3rd place, bronze medalist(s)	Trey Mitchell	United States	36
4	Pavlo Kordiyaka	Ukraine	31.5
5	Ondřej Fojtů	Czech Republic	31.5
6	Martins Licis	Latvia	30.5
7	Mathew Ragg	New Zealand	29
8	Eddie Williams	Australia	26
9	Nick Guardione	United States	21
10	Austin Andrade	Mexico	12.5

Preceded by 2025 World's Strongest Man	2026 World's Strongest Man	Succeeded by 2027 World's Strongest Man
