= South Africa's Strongest Man =

Annual strongman competition in South Africa

Tournament information
- Location: South Africa
- Established: 1989
- Format: South Africa's Strongest Man

Current champion
- (South Africa) Armand Goosen (2026)

South Africa's Strongest Man is an annual strongman competition held in South Africa and features primarily South African strength athletes. It has been held since 1989. Gerrit Badenhorst and Ettiene Smit holds the record for the most titles with 8 wins each.

South Africa has also been the venue for Africa's Strongest Man competition which is the continent's largest strongman competition. It has been held since 2015.

== National competitions ==
=== South Africa's Strongest Man ===
Year	Champion	Runner-up	3rd place
1989	(South Africa) Gerrit Badenhorst	(South Africa) Wayne Price	(To be confirmed)
1990	(South Africa) Gerrit Badenhorst	(South Africa) Wayne Price	(To be confirmed)
1991	(South Africa) Wayne Price	(South Africa) Gerrit Badenhorst	(To be confirmed)
1992	(South Africa) Gerrit Badenhorst	(South Africa) Wayne Price	(To be confirmed)
1993	(South Africa) Gerrit Badenhorst	(South Africa) Wayne Price	(To be confirmed)
1994	(South Africa) Gerrit Badenhorst	(Namibia) Anton Boucher	(South Africa) Wayne Price
1995	(South Africa) Gerrit Badenhorst	(South Africa) Wayne Price	(Namibia) Anton Boucher
1996	Event not held		
1997	(South Africa) Johan Rheeder	(South Africa) Gerrit Badenhorst	(South Africa) Pieter de Bruyn
1998	(South Africa) Gerrit Badenhorst	(South Africa) Pieter de Bruyn	(South Africa) Johan Rheeder
1999–2000	Event not held		
2001	(South Africa) Gerrit Badenhorst	(South Africa) Pieter de Bruyn	(South Africa) Ettiene Smit
2002	(South Africa) Johan Ver Heerden	(South Africa) Ettiene Smit	(South Africa) David Cooks
2003	(South Africa) David Cooks	(South Africa) Ettiene Smit	(South Africa) Gerhard Botha
2004	(South Africa) Ettiene Smit	(South Africa) David Cooks	(South Africa) Arno Lambrechts
2005	(South Africa) Ettiene Smit	(South Africa) David Cooks	(South Africa) Arno Lambrechts
2006	(South Africa) Ettiene Smit	(South Africa) Rory Scheepers	(South Africa) Hennie Jordaan
2007	(South Africa) Ettiene Smit	(South Africa) Hennie Jordaan	(South Africa) Rory Scheepers
2008	(South Africa) Ettiene Smit	(South Africa) Hennie Jordaan	(South Africa) Rory Scheepers
2009	(South Africa) Ettiene Smit	(South Africa) Hennie Jordaan	(South Africa) Rory Scheepers
2010	(South Africa) Frankie Scheun	(South Africa) Gerhard van Staden	(South Africa) Willem Moore
2011	(South Africa) Gerhard van Staden	(South Africa) Ettiene Smit	(South Africa) Hennie Jordaan
2012	(South Africa) Tristen O'Brien	(South Africa) Andre Sweeney	(South Africa) Ettiene Smit
2013	Event not held		
2014	(South Africa) Ettiene Smit	(South Africa) Sholto Luiters	(South Africa) Kelin Mills
2015	(South Africa) Frankie Scheun	(South Africa) Tristen O'Brien	(South Africa) Theron Kleinhans
2016	(South Africa) Ettiene Smit	(South Africa) Dean Shelley	(South Africa) Andre Sweeney
2017	(South Africa) Johan Rudd	(South Africa) Stefan Smit	(South Africa) Tristen O'Brien
2018	(South Africa) Kelin Mills	(South Africa) Dean Shelley	(South Africa) Chris van der Linde
2019	(South Africa) Kelin Mills	(South Africa) Ryan Preston	(South Africa) Dean Shelley
2020–2021	Event not held		
2022	(South Africa) Jaco Schoonwinkel	(South Africa) David Bezuidenhout	(South Africa) Robert Haman
2023	(South Africa) Rayno Nel	(South Africa) Chris van der Linde	(South Africa) Dean Shelley
2024	(South Africa) Rayno Nel	(South Africa) Jacque De Jager	(South Africa) Jacques Boshoff
2025	(South Africa) Kelin Mills	(South Africa) Dean Shelley	(South Africa) Armand Goosen
2026	(South Africa) Armand Goosen	(South Africa) Ben Bucarizza	(South Africa) Jacque de Jager

== Regional competitions ==
=== Africa's Strongest Man ===
Year	Champion	Runner-up	3rd place
2015	(South Africa) Gerhard van Staden	(South Africa) Andre Sweeney	(South Africa) Johan Rudd
2016	(South Africa) Johan Els	(Grenada) Mark Felix	(South Africa) Frankie Scheun
2017	(South Africa) Dean Shelley	(South Africa) Andre Sweeney	(Namibia) Sven Reimers
2018	(South Africa) Johan Els	(South Africa) Johan Rudd	(South Africa) Dean Shelley
2019	(South Africa) Chris van der Linde	(South Africa) Tristen O'Brien	(South Africa) Kelin Mills
2020	(South Africa) Dean Shelley	(South Africa) Chris van der Linde	(South Africa) Tristen O'Brien
2021	(South Africa) Thobelani Mabaso	(South Africa) Jaco Schoonwinkel	(South Africa) Ben Bucarizza
2022	(South Africa) Kelin Mills	(South Africa) Terence Bosman	(South Africa) Tewie Labuschagne
2023	(South Africa) Rayno Nel	(South Africa) Dean Shelley	(South Africa) Chris van der Linde
2024	(South Africa) Rayno Nel	(South Africa) Jacque de Jager	(South Africa) Jacques Boshoff
2025	(South Africa) Jaco Schoonwinkel	(Ghana) Evans Nana	(South Africa) Dean Shelley
