= Eddie Williams (strongman) =

Australian strongman

Personal information
- Born: Adelaide, South Australia, Australia
- Height: 6 ft 4 in (1.93 m)
- Weight: 180 kg (397 lb)

Sport
- Sport: Strongman
Medal record
Strongman
Representing Australia
World's Strongest Man
Qualified	2019 World's Strongest Man
Qualified	2023 World's Strongest Man
Qualified	2024 World's Strongest Man
10th	2025 World's Strongest Man
8th	2026 World's Strongest Man
Shaw Classic
11th	2025 Strongest Man on Earth
Arnold Pro Strongman World Series
9th	2018 Australia
5th	2019 Australia
8th	2019 South America
12th	2020 USA
Giants Live
7th	2019 North American Open
6th	2022 Strongman Classic
9th	2022 World Tour Finals
5th	2023 Strongman Classic
10th	2023 World Tour Finals
10th	2024 Strongman Classic
3rd	2024 World Tour Finals
5th	2025 World Open
10th	2026 World Tour Finals
Australia's Strongest Man
1st	2017 Australia's Strongest Man
1st	2018 Australia's Strongest Man

Eddie Jo Williams (born 30 June 1990) is an Australian strongman and singer from Adelaide, South Australia.

== Biography ==
Williams was born in 1990 in Samoa. He moved to Australia to play rugby while concurrently working as a youth support worker.

He is a two-time Australia's Strongest Man and has competed at the World's Strongest Man competition five times (2019, 2023, 2024, 2025, and 2026). He placed 10th in the finals of the World's Strongest Man for the first time in 2025 and set a championship record for the Hercules Hold, holding the two pillars of 159 kg (351 lb) for 1 minute and 22 seconds. In 2026 at World's Strongest Man, he improved his placing to 8th in the finals.

He is also known for his appearances on Australia's Got Talent in October 2019, America's Got Talent: Champions 2, and the South Korean reality show Physical: Asia.

== Personal records ==
- Deadlift (with suit and straps) – 425 kg (937 lb) (2024 World Deadlift Championships)
- Deadlift for reps – 400 kg (882 lb) x 3 reps (2026 World's Strongest Man)
- Squat for reps – 317.5 kg (700 lb) x 11 reps (2026 World's Strongest Man, group 3)
- Log lift – 172.5 kg (380 lb) (2025 Strongest Man on Earth)
