= Rayno Nel =

South African strongman

Personal information
- Nationality: South African
- Born: 9 May 1995 (age 31) Upington, South Africa
- Occupation: Strongman
- Height: 6 ft 3 in (1.91 m)
- Weight: 148 kg (326 lb)
- Spouse: Married
Medal record
Strongman
Representing South Africa
World's Strongest Man
1st	2025 World's Strongest Man
2nd	2026 World's Strongest Man
Rogue Invitational
8th	2025 Rogue Invitational
3rd	2026 Rogue Invitational
Giants Live
4th	2025 Strongman Classic
3rd	2026 Strongman Classic
Strongman Champions League
1st	2024 SCL Holland
1st	2024 SCL Africa
1st	2024 SCL World Finals
1st	2025 SCL Italy
1st	2025 SCL Holland
1st	2025 SCL World Finals
1st	2026 SCL World Finals
Siberian Power Show
4th	2024 Siberian Power Show
Africa's Strongest Man
1st	2023 Africa's Strongest Man
1st	2024 Africa's Strongest Man
South Africa's Strongest Man
1st	2023 South Africa's Strongest Man
1st	2024 South Africa's Strongest Man

Rayno Nel (born 9 May 1995) is a South African strongman competitor from Krugersdorp. He is the 2025 World's Strongest Man champion and the first winner of the title from South Africa, the continent of Africa and the southern hemisphere.

He is also a two-time Africa's Strongest Man, two-time South Africa's Strongest Man and the three-time Strongman Champions League world champion.

== Career ==
Nel started his career as a Rugby player, playing for the Central University of Technology and Free State Cheetahs. In 2023, he tried strongman by participating in South Africa's Strongest Man competition, where he emerged victorious. With back-to-back victories, he was invited to the Siberian Power Show and the Strongman Champions League to compete alongside other leading international athletes.

Despite a foot fracture which occurred in event two, he placed fourth at 2024 Siberian Power Show and then went on a dominant run, winning 2024 SCL Holland, 2024 SCL Africa and 2024 SCL World Finals.

In 2025, Nel was given a wildcard invite to the 2025 World's Strongest Man Competition. In a group filled with seasoned pros, such as 2x podium finisher Mateusz Kieliszkowski and runner up at the Arnold Strongman Classic Lucas Hatton, he won his group and proceeded to defeat both former champions Mitchell Hooper and Tom Stoltman in the final to win the World's Strongest Man.

After his victory at WSM, Nel recorded two further victories over successive weekends at the Strongman Champions League, SCL Italy and SCL Holland.

Nel made his debut on the Giants Live circuit in July 2025, finishing 4th at the Strongman Classic behind Evan Singleton, fellow South African Jaco Schoonwinkel and Paddy Haynes.

Having come 8th at the Rogue Invitational at the start of the month, Nel claimed his 9th international title in November 2025 at the SCL World Finals in his native Upington, South Africa. Nel won six of the seven events, breaking multiple SCL records in the process, to win his sixth successive SCL meet.

In April 2026, Nel came 2nd at World's Strongest Man narrowly missing out on the title to Mitchell Hooper. He followed this up with a 3rd place finish at the Giants Live Strongman Open at the Royal Albert Hall in July.

In November 2026, Nel once again triumphed at the SCL World Finals in South Africa. He won six of the nine events, including setting a new African Deadlift Record of 460kg, finishing 22.5 points clear of Evans Nana.

== Personal records ==
- Deadlift (for max) – 400 kg (882 lb) × 5 reps (2026 World's Strongest Man)
- Elevated Wheel Deadlift (from 18 inches) – 490 kg (1,080 lb) (2025 World's Strongest Man)
- Log press (for max) – 200 kg (441 lb) (2026 World's Strongest Man)
- Log press (for reps) – 150 kg (331 lb) × 7 reps (2024 SCL Africa)
- Flintstone barbell push press (behind the neck) – 188 kg (414 lb) (2025 World's Strongest Man)
- Squat (for reps) – 317.5 kg (700.0 lb) × 13 reps (2026 World's Strongest Man)
- Atlas Stones – 5 stones weighing 120 to 200 kg (265 to 441 lb) in 47.72 seconds (2024 SCL Holland)
- Natural Stone loading (low platforms) – 4 rocks weighing 160 to 210 kg (353 to 463 lb) in 17.19 seconds (2024 SCL World Finals) (World Record)
- Shield Carry – (World Record) (2025 SCL World Finals)
- Hercules Hold – (SCL Record) (2025 SCL World Finals)
- Steinstossen (SCL version) – 75 kg (165 lb) for 3.20 metres (10 ft 6 in) (2024 SCL World Finals)
- Truck pull – 16,000 kg (35,274 lb) over 25 meters in 33.34 seconds (2024 SCL Holland)

== Competitive record ==
Winning percentage: 62.50%
Podium percentage: 81.25%

=== Major Competitions ===
Year	Competition	Placing	Location	Notes
2026	SCL World Finals	1st	Upington, South Africa	Successfully defended his SCL World Champion title in front of a home crowd; set a new African Deadlift record.
2026	Rogue Invitational	3rd	Aberdeen, Scotland	
2026	Giants Live Strongman Classic	3rd	London, England	
2026	World's Strongest Man	2nd	Myrtle Beach, United States	Narrowly missed the title to Mitchell Hooper by 2 points.
2025	SCL World Finals	1st	Upington, South Africa	Successfully defended his SCL World Champion title in front of a home crowd; set a new Shield Carry world record.
2025	Rogue Invitational	8th	Aberdeen, Scotland	
2025	Giants Live Strongman Classic	4th	London, England	
2025	SCL Holland	1st	Doetinchem, Netherlands	
2025	SCL Italy	1st	Crema, Italy	
2025	World's Strongest Man	1st	Sacramento, United States	First rookie to win since 1997, and the first winner from South Africa and the African continent.
2024	Africa's Strongest Man	1st	South Africa	
2024	South Africa's Strongest Man	1st	Mossel Bay, South Africa	Successfully defended his national title.
2024	SCL World Finals	1st		Secured his first Strongman Champions League World title.
2024	SCL Africa	1st		
2024	SCL Holland	1st		Nel's international debut and first SCL victory.
2024	Siberian Power Show	4th		Placed 4th despite suffering a foot fracture during the second event.
2023	South Africa's Strongest Man	1st	Rustenburg, South Africa	Won the title in his rookie strongman season.

== Personal life ==
Nel balances his athletic training with a full-time career as an electrical engineer.

Prior to his strongman career, Nel was a competitive rugby union player. He served as the captain of the CUT Ixias university rugby team for three consecutive seasons in the Varsity Cup and later played professionally as a flanker for the Free State Cheetahs.

== Filmography ==
=== Television ===
Year	Title	Role	Notes
2025-2026	World's Strongest Man	Himself – Competitor	1x Champion
2026	Battle of the Beasts	Himself – Competitor	
