= Ettiene Smit =

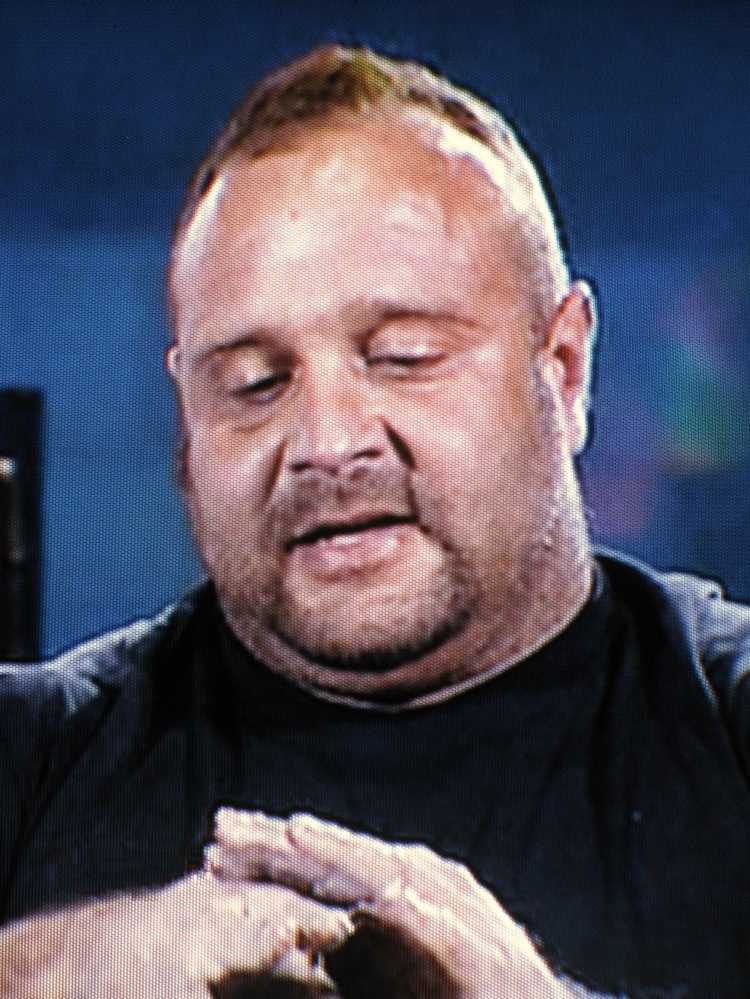
- Born: Etienne Smit; June 15, 1974 (age 51); Johannesburg, South Africa
- Occupation: Strongman
- Height: 5 ft 11 in (1.80 m)
- Title: 6 times South Africa's Strongest Man

Competition record

Strongman

Representing South Africa

World's Strongest Man
Qualified	2009 World's Strongest Man	
Qualified	2010 World's Strongest Man	

IFSA Strongman World Championships
Qualified	2006 IFSA Strongman World Championships	
Qualified	2007 IFSA Strongman World Championships	

Strongman Champions League
8th	Ukraine 2009 SCL Finals	
4th	2010 Holland	
7th	2011 SCL Iceman Challenge II	
7th	2011 Germany FIBO	
2nd	2011 South Africa	
10th	2011 Holland	
8th	2012 Serbia	
6th	2012 Holland	
10th	2012 SCL Savicas Classic; SCL Semi-finals	

Giants Live
6th	2010 South Africa	

IFSA Grand Prix's
3rd	2005 Hungary Grand Prix	
2nd	2007 Holland Grand Prix	

South Africa's Strongest Man
3rd	2001 South Africa's Strongest Man	
4th	2002 South Africa's Strongest Man	
2nd	2003 South Africa's Strongest Man	
1st	2004 South Africa's Strongest Man	
1st	2005 South Africa's Strongest Man	
1st	2006 South Africa's Strongest Man	
1st	2007 South Africa's Strongest Man	
1st	2008 South Africa's Strongest Man	
1st	2009 South Africa's Strongest Man	

Ettiene Smit (born 15 June 1974) is a South African strongman competitor and entrant to the World's Strongest Man competition.

== Biography ==
Etienne Smith was born in Johannesburg. He started his strength athletics career at the age of 26 and within five years had become crowned South Africa's strongest man. From 2004 to 2009 he did not relinquish this title winning a record six times in a row. He has stated that his international presence in strength athletics has been curtailed by financial difficulties, although he was able to take up an invitation to the prestigious World's Strongest Man in both 2009 and 2010. Aside from strength athletics, he owns a restaurant in Pretoria, South Africa.

== Strongman competition record ==
- 2001
  - 3. - South Africa's Strongest Man
- 2002
  - 4. - South Africa's Strongest Man
- 2003
  - 2. - South Africa's Strongest Man
- 2004
  - 1. - South Africa's Strongest Man
- 2005
  - 1. - South Africa's Strongest Man
  - 3. - IFSA Hungary GP
  - 6. - Champions Trophy Holland
- 2006
  - 1. - South Africa's Strongest Man
- 2007
  - 1. - South Africa's Strongest Man
- 2008
  - 1. - South Africa's Strongest Man
- 2009
  - 1. - South Africa's Strongest Man
