= 2025 Rogue Invitational =

Athletic competition

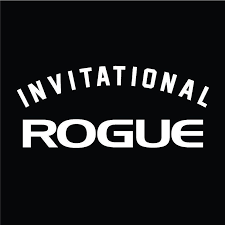
- Venue: P&J Live
- Location: Aberdeen, Scotland
- Dates: October 31 – November 2, 2025

Champions
- CrossFit men: (Canada) Jeffrey Adler; CrossFit women: (Hungary) Laura Horvath; Strongman: (Canada) Mitchell Hooper; Strongwoman: (Puerto Rico) Inez Carrasquillo

The 2025 Rogue Invitational was the seventh annual sporting event organized by Rogue Fitness held from October 31 to November 2, 2025, at P&J Live in Aberdeen, Scotland. It featured competitions in the sport of CrossFit, strongman, and strongwoman. Jeffrey Adler was the winner of the men's CrossFit competition, Laura Horvath in the women's, Mitchell Hooper in strongman, and Inez Carrasquillo in strongwoman.

This year's Rogue Invitational is the 7th competition in CrossFit, 5th in strongman, and second in strongwoman. 20 men and 20 women compete in the CrossFit divisions, and 10 men and 10 women compete in the strongman and strongwoman competitions. As with previous years, Rogue provided a prize purse of a million in cash and an investment of $275,000 of Bitcoin, with additional money from ticket and apparel sales as well as online registration fees going into the prize pot.

== Competitiors ==
Most CrossFit athletes are invited based on the Rogue point ranking system. The online "Q" qualifier was held September 5–7 from which a few athletes are also invited. 20 men and 20 women will compete in CrossFit.

Ten strongmen and ten strongwomen are also invited.

=== CrossFit men ===
- (Canada) Jeff Adler
- (Canada) Pat Vellner
- (United States) Justin Medeiros
- (Iceland) Bjorgvin Karl Gudmundsson
- (United States) Jayson Hopper
- (Australia) Ricky Garard
- (United Kingdom) Harry Lightfoot
- (Australia) Jay Crouch
- (United States) Chandler Smith
- (United States) Sam Kwant
- (Finland) Jonne Koski
- (United States) James Sprague
- (Brazil) Guilherme Malheiros
- (Finland) Henrik Haapalainen
- (United States) Austin Hatfield
- (United States) Colten Mertens
- (United States) Roman Khrennikov
- (Netherlands) Fabian Hermans
- (Latvia) Uldis Upenieks
- (United States) Saxon Panchik

=== CrossFit women ===
- (Australia) Grace Walton
- (Hungary) Laura Horvath
- (United States) Danielle Brandon
- (United States) Arielle Loewen
- (United States) Alex Gazan
- (Canada) Emily Rolfe
- (United States) Haley Adams
- (Australia) Madeline Sturt
- (Belgium) Manon Angonese
- (United States) Brooke Wells
- (United States) Dani Speegle
- (United States) Alexis Raptis
- (Canada) Emma Lawson
- (United States) Olivia Kerstetter
- (United Kingdom) Lucy Campbell
- (United States) Abigail Domit
- (United States) Paige Semenza
- (Sweden) Emma Tall
- (United States) Paige Rodgers
- (Italy) Elisa Fuliano

=== Strongman ===
- (Canada) Mitchell Hooper
- (Iceland) ~~Hafthor Björnsson~~ (Note: Hafthor Björnsson withdrew from the competition due to injury, but participated in some events.)
- (Scotland) Tom Stoltman
- (United States) Trey Mitchell
- (South Africa) Rayno Nel
- (United States) Bryce Johnson
- (United States) Thomas Evans
- (United States) Lucas Hatton
- (United States) Austin Andrade
- (United Kingdom) Paddy Haynes

=== Strongwoman ===
- (United States) Angelica Jardine
- (Ukraine) Olga Liashchuk
- (United Kingdom) Lucy Underdown
- (Puerto Rico) Inez Carrasquillo
- (United Kingdom) Rebecca Roberts
- (United Kingdom) Andrea Thompson
- (United Kingdom) Jennifer Lyle
- (Canada) Melissa Peacock
- (United States) Hannah Linzay
- (Canada) Samantha Belliveau

== CrossFit ==
=== Event 1: Nessie ===
- 160 Double Unders
- 80m Handstand Walk
- 60 GHD Sit Up
- 40 Box Jump Over
- 20/16 Log Bar Muscle Up

#	Men	Time	Pts Total	Women	Time	Pts Total
1	(United States) Justin Medeiros	8:46	100	(United States) Danielle Brandon	9:24	100
2	(Australia) Jay Crouch	9:23.75	95	(United States) Paige Rodgers	9:32.60	95
3	(Canada) Patrick Vellner	9:30.77	90	(United States) Arielle Loewen	10:08.78	90
4	(Finland) Jonne Koski	9:51.23	85	(Canada) Emma Lawson	10:21.22	85
5	(Australia) Ricky Garard	9:54.97	80	(United States) Alex Gazan	10:21.48	80
6	(United States) Saxon Panchik	10:06.58	75	(Australia) Madeline Sturt	10:29.93	75
7	(Brazil) Guilherme Malheiros	10:13.24	70	(Hungary) Laura Horvath	11:12.80	70
8	(United States) Chandler Smith	10:13.44	65	(Italy) Elisa Fuliano	11:38.86	65
9	(United Kingdom) Harry Lightfoot	10:17.01	60	(United States) Alexis Raptis	12:00.89	60
10	(United States) Colten Mertens	10:27.93	55	(United States) Abigail Domit	12:12.05	55
11	(Canada) Jeffrey Adler	10:29.69	50	(Sweden) Emma Tall	12:28.21	50
12	(United States) Austin Hatfield	10:42.13	45	(United States) Dani Speegle	12:32.63	45
13	(United States) James Sprague	10:48.50	40	(Belgium) Manon Angonese	13:00.17	40
14	(Latvia) Uldis Upenieks	10:58.52	35	(United States) Olivia Kerstetter	13:29.98	35
15	(Authorised Neutral Athletes) Roman Khrennikov	11:01.56	30	(United Kingdom) Lucy Campbell	14:59.36	30
16	(Iceland) Björgvin Karl Gudmundsson	11:27.50	25	(United States) Paige Semenza	15:28.21	25
17	(Finland) Henrik Haapalainen	11:29.12	20	(Australia) Grace Walton	CAP+2	20
18	(United States) Jayson Hopper	11:41.78	15	(United States) Brooke Wells	CAP+2	15
19	(United States) Samuel Kwant	11:59.29	10	(Canada) Emily Rolfe	CAP+4	10
20	(Netherlands) Fabian Hermans	15:40.94	0	(United States) Haley Adams	CAP+16	0

=== Event 2: William Wallace ===
3 Rounds

- 5 Log Clean and Press (215LB/150LB)
- 40ft Yoke Carry
- 1 Power Stair

#	Men	Time	Pts Total	Women	Time	Pts Total
1	(United States) Jayson Hopper	3:45.55	115	(United States) Alex Gazan	4:59.77	180
2	(Canada) Jeff Adler	3:53.71	145	(United States) Dani Speegle	5:05.23	140
3	(United States) James Sprague	4:13.83	130	(United States) Olivia Kerstetter	5:07.10	125
4	(Australia) Ricky Garard	4:42.58	165	(United States) Danielle Brandon	5:09.65	185
5	(Canada) Patrick Vellner	4:42.81	170	(Hungary) Laura Horvath	5:15	150
6	(Australia) Jay Crouch	4:49.46	170	(United States) Alexis Raptis	5:17.75	135
7	(United States) Justin Medeiros	4:55.49	170	(United States) Arielle Loewen	5:24.79	160
8	(United States) Austin Hatfield	5:09.78	110	(United States) Brooke Wells	5:34.83	80
9	(United States) Colten Mertens	5:12.82	115	(Belgium) Manon Angonese	5:35.89	100
10	(Finland) Henrik Haapalainen	5:18.82	75	(Sweden) Emma Tall	5:45.73	105
11	(United States) Chandler Smith	5:29.86	115	(United Kingdom) Lucy Campbell	6:00.48	80
12	(Netherlands) Fabian Hermans	6:14.69	45	(Australia) Grace Walton	6:07.47	65
13	(United States) Saxon Panchik	6:18.67	115	(United States) Haley Adams	7:27.41	40
14	(Authorised Neutral Athletes) Roman Khrennikov	6:20.78	65	(Canada) Emma Lawson	7:27.69	120
15	(Finland) Jonne Koski	6:22.06	115	(United States) Paige Rodgers	7:51.30	125
16	(Brazil) Guilherme Malheiros	6:35.79	95	(Canada) Emily Rolfe	CAP+1	35
17	(Iceland) Björgvin Karl Gudmundsson	6:38.20	45	(United States) Abigail Domit	CAP+1	75
18	(United States) Samuel Kwant	6:57.26	25	(Italy) Elisa Fuliano	CAP+1	80
19	(United Kingdom) Harry Lightfoot	7:32	70	(Australia) Madeline Sturt	CAP+2	85
20	(Latvia) Uldis Upenieks	CAP+7	35	(United States) Paige Semenza	CAP+7	25

=== Event 3: Tax Collector ===
4 Rounds

- 10 Back Squat (315LB/225LB)
- 10 Dumbbell Snatch (100LB/70LB)
- 10 Sandbag Clean (150LB/100LB)

#	Men	Time	Pts Total	Women	Time	Pts Total
1	(United States) Colten Mertens	10:27.66	215	(United States) Olivia Kerstetter	11:38.59	225
2	(United States) Justin Medeiros	12:26.19	265	(United States) Dani Speegle	12:05.94	235
3	(United States) James Sprague	12:43.87	220	(United Kingdom) Lucy Campbell	12:18.04	170
4	(Australia) Jay Crouch	12:48.02	255	(Hungary) Laura Horvath	12:58.90	235
5	(Authorised Neutral Athletes) Roman Khrennikov	12:55.50	145	(Canada) Emily Rolfe	13:04.26	115
6	(Netherlands) Fabian Hermans	13:17.58	120	(United States) Brooke Wells	13:31.70	155
7	(Canada) Jeff Adler	13:26.03	215	(Canada) Emma Lawson	13:43.77	190
8	(Canada) Patrick Vellner	13:41.13	235	(Australia) Madeline Sturt	13:57.96	150
9	(United States) Chandler Smith	14:08.04	175	(Australia) Grace Walton	14:00.61	125
10	(United States) Jayson Hopper	14:17.97	170	(United States) Alex Gazan	14:54.47	235
11	(Iceland) Björgvin Karl Gudmundsson	14:31.05	95	(Sweden) Emma Tall	15:25.74	155
12	(United States) Austin Hatfield	14:36.43	155	(United States) Paige Semenza	CAP+3	70
13	(Finland) Jonne Koski	15:02.20	155	(United States) Paige Rodgers	CAP+3	165
14	(United States) Saxon Panchik	15:57.86	150	(Italy) Elisa Fuliano	CAP+10	115
15	(United States) Samuel Kwant	CAP+9	55	(Belgium) Manon Angonese	CAP+12	130
16	(United Kingdom) Harry Lightfoot	CAP+9	95	(United States) Abigail Domit	CAP+20	100
17	(Finland) Henrik Haapalainen	CAP+10	95	(United States) Alexis Raptis	CAP+21	155
18	(Australia) Ricky Garard	CAP+16	180	(United States) Danielle Brandon	CAP+22	200
19	(Brazil) Guilherme Malheiros	CAP+22	105	(United States) Arielle Loewen	CAP+28	170
20	(Latvia) Uldis Upenieks	WD	35	(United States) Haley Adams	CAP+29	40

=== Event 4: The Crux ===
- 20/18 Calorie Row

15-12-9-6-3

- Bench Press (75% bodyweight)
- 1 Horizontal Peg Board

#	Men	Time	Pts Total	Women	Time	Pts Total
1	(United States) Jayson Hopper	12:10.84	270	(Hungary) Laura Horvath	14:02.21	335
2	(Finland) Henrik Haapalainen	12:36.63	190	(United States) Arielle Loewen	17:38.16	265
3	(Canada) Jeff Adler	13:00.04	305	(United Kingdom) Lucy Campbell	19:08.52	260
4	(United States) Samuel Kwant	13:01.47	140	(United States) Alex Gazan	CAP+1	320
5	(Authorised Neutral Athletes) Roman Khrennikov	13:01.71	225	(Canada) Emma Lawson	CAP+1	270
6	(Brazil) Guilherme Malheiros	13:10.54	180	(United States) Brooke Wells	CAP+2	230
7	(United States) James Sprague	13:20.65	290	(Belgium) Manon Angonese	CAP+2	200
8	(Canada) Patrick Vellner	14:05.25	300	(United States) Paige Rodgers	CAP+10	230
9	(Australia) Jay Crouch	14:32.78	315	(Australia) Madeline Sturt	CAP+19	210
10	(Finland) Jonne Koski	15:58.92	210	(United States) Alexis Raptis	CAP+24	210
11	(Iceland) Björgvin Karl Gudmundsson	16:12.71	145	(Australia) Grace Walton	CAP+24	175
12	(Australia) Ricky Garard	16:53.68	225	(United States) Danielle Brandon	CAP+24	245
13	(United States) Justin Medeiros	17:12.41	305	(Italy) Elisa Fuliano	CAP+25	155
14	(United States) Chandler Smith	18:51.44	210	(United States) Dani Speegle	CAP+50	270
15	(United States) Austin Hatfield	19:04.47	185	(United States) Paige Semenza	CAP+50	100
16	(Netherlands) Fabian Hermans	CAP+1	145	(United States) Haley Adams	CAP+50	65
17	(United Kingdom) Harry Lightfoot	CAP+2	115	(United States) Olivia Kerstetter	CAP+50	245
18	(United States) Saxon Panchik	CAP+26	165	(Canada) Emily Rolfe	CAP+51	130
19	(United States) Colten Mertens	CAP+55	225	(United States) Abigail Domit	CAP+80	110
20	(Latvia) Uldis Upenieks	WD	35	(Sweden) Emma Tall	WD	155

=== Event 5: The Duel V ===
Bracket style event

- Three Log Traverse (Over - Under - Over)
- 65' Hand Over Hand Sled Pull (225LB/175LB)
- 1 Bag to Pedestal (200LB/150LB)

#	Men	Round (Time)	Pts Total	Women	Round (Time)	Pts Total
1	(United States) Jayson Hopper	5 (29.68)	370	(Hungary) Laura Horvath	5 (36.34)	435
2	(Authorised Neutral Athletes) Roman Khrennikov	5 (30.56)	320	(United States) Dani Speegle	5 (52.39)	365
3	(United States) James Sprague	4 (30.17)	380	(United States) Olivia Kerstetter	4 (40.98)	335
4	(Australia) Ricky Garard	4 (30.42)	310	(United States) Danielle Brandon	4 (43.58)	330
5	(Canada) Patrick Vellner	4 (32.78)	380	(United States) Alex Gazan	4 (52.76)	400
6	(Finland) Henrik Haapalainen	3 (30.28)	265	(United States) Arielle Loewen	3 (39.26)	340
7	(United States) Justin Medeiros	3 (30.36)	375	(United States) Alexis Raptis	3 (39.87)	280
8	(Brazil) Guilherme Malheiros	3 (30.78)	245	(Australia) Grace Walton	3 (40.52)	240
9	(Iceland) Björgvin Karl Gudmundsson	3 (31.53)	205	(Belgium) Manon Angonese	3 (42.72)	260
10	(United States) Samuel Kwant	3 (-)	195	(United States) Paige Semenza	3 (43.38)	155
11	(Canada) Jeff Adler	2 (31.28)	355	(United States) Abigail Domit	2 (40.35)	160
12	(Australia) Jay Crouch	2 (31.44)	360	(United Kingdom) Lucy Campbell	2 (41.79)	305
13	(Finland) Jonne Koski	2 (32.24)	250	(Canada) Emma Lawson	2 (42.10)	310
14	(Netherlands) Fabian Hermans	2 (33.69)	180	(Canada) Emily Rolfe	2 (43.31)	165
15	(United Kingdom) Harry Lightfoot	2 (35.91)	145	(United States) Paige Rodgers	2 (44.44)	260
16	(United States) Chandler Smith	1 (36.16)	235	(United States) Haley Adams	1 (42.22)	90
17	(United States) Saxon Panchik	1 (37.00)	185	(Australia) Madeline Sturt	1 (43.31)	230
18	(United States) Austin Hatfield	1 (38.64)	200	(United States) Brooke Wells	1 (46.07)	245
19	(United States) Colten Mertens	1 (38.96)	235	(Italy) Elisa Fuliano	1 (48.05)	165
20	(Latvia) Uldis Upenieks	WD	35	(Sweden) Emma Tall	WD	155

=== Event 6: Pay the Piper ===
Buy in:

- 1000m SkiErg

Into:
12-9-6-3-1

- Wall Facing HSPU
- Deadlift

#	Men	Time	Pts Total	Women	Time	Pts Total
1	(Canada) Jeff Adler	6:33.74	455	(United States) Olivia Kerstetter	7:16.73	435
2	(Canada) Patrick Vellner	6:34.68	475	(United States) Brooke Wells	7:17.81	340
3	(United States) Colten Mertens	6:41.83	325	(Hungary) Laura Horvath	7:42.86	525
4	(Authorised Neutral Athletes) Roman Khrennikov	6:45.10	405	(United States) Alex Gazan	7:52.62	485
5	(United States) Jayson Hopper	6:45.65	450	(Australia) Madeline Sturt	7:57.40	310
6	(United States) Justin Medeiros	6:47.25	450	(United States) Dani Speegle	7:58.16	440
7	(Australia) Jay Crouch	6:55.64	430	(Australia) Grace Walton	8:00.68	310
8	(United States) Chandler Smith	6:56.23	300	(United States) Arielle Loewen	8:03.12	405
9	(Finland) Henrik Haapalainen	6:59.78	325	(Belgium) Manon Angonese	8:31.38	320
10	(United States) James Sprague	7:00.42	435	(United States) Paige Rodgers	8:35.96	315
11	(Australia) Ricky Garard	7:01.11	360	(Italy) Elisa Fuliano	9:08.62	215
12	(United States) Austin Hatfield	7:02.90	245	(Canada) Emma Lawson	9:20.58	355
13	(Brazil) Guilherme Malheiros	7:07.70	285	(United States) Paige Semenza	9:22.67	195
14	(Netherlands) Fabian Hermans	7:09.29	215	(United Kingdom) Lucy Campbell	9:36.39	340
15	(United States) Saxon Panchik	7:15.73	215	(United States) Abigail Domit	9:52.52	190
16	(United Kingdom) Harry Lightfoot	7:23.30	170	(United States) Danielle Brandon	CAP+1	355
17	(Finland) Jonne Koski	7:24.29	270	(United States) Haley Adams	CAP+1	110
18	(Iceland) Björgvin Karl Gudmundsson	7:31.01	220	(Canada) Emily Rolfe	CAP+1	180
19	(United States) Samuel Kwant	WD	195	(United States) Alexis Raptis	CAP+1	290
20	(Latvia) Uldis Upenieks	WD	35	(Sweden) Emma Tall	WD	155

=== Event 7: Granite City ===
- 1300 m Run
- 4/3 Rope Climb
- 50' Feed Sack Lunge (150/100)
- 1300 m Run
- 4/3 Rope Climb
- 50' Feed Sack Lunge (150/100)
- 1300 m Run
- 4/3 Rope Climb
- 50' Feed Sack Lunge (150/100)
- 1300m Run

#	Men	Time	Pts Total	Women	Time	Pts Total
1	(Australia) Ricky Garard	25:16.44	460	(Canada) Emma Lawson	27:20.98	455
2	(Canada) Jeff Adler	25:31.69	550	(United Kingdom) Lucy Campbell	27:33.06	435
3	(Authorised Neutral Athletes) Roman Khrennikov	25:50.14	495	(Canada) Emily Rolfe	28:08.07	270
4	(United States) Justin Medeiros	26:57.78	535	(Hungary) Laura Horvath	28:47.49	610
5	(United States) James Sprague	27:04.26	515	(United States) Alexis Raptis	28:50.97	370
6	(United States) Jayson Hopper	27:26.62	525	(Australia) Madeline Sturt	29:05.48	385
7	(United States) Austin Hatfield	27:33.37	315	(United States) Danielle Brandon	29:30.07	425
8	(United States) Saxon Panchik	27:38.23	280	(United States) Paige Rodgers	29:42.64	380
9	(Australia) Jay Crouch	27:42.01	490	(Australia) Grace Walton	29:46.82	370
10	(United States) Chandler Smith	27:50.63	355	(United States) Alex Gazan	30:05.72	540
11	(Finland) Henrik Haapalainen	28:31.66	375	(United States) Arielle Loewen	30:14.21	455
12	(Iceland) Björgvin Karl Gudmundsson	28:53.46	265	(United States) Brooke Wells	30:14.70	385
13	(Canada) Patrick Vellner	29:00.91	515	(United States) Haley Adams	30:18.19	150
14	(United Kingdom) Harry Lightfoot	29:24.44	205	(United States) Abigail Domit	30:48.17	225
15	(United States) Colten Mertens	29:49.68	355	(Italy) Elisa Fuliano	31:09.46	245
16	(Finland) Jonne Koski	CAP+1	295	(United States) Olivia Kerstetter	31:31.91	460
17	(Brazil) Guilherme Malheiros	CAP+2	305	(United States) Paige Semenza	31:40.22	215
18	(Netherlands) Fabian Hermans	CAP+3	230	(Belgium) Manon Angonese	31:45.09	335
19	(United States) Samuel Kwant	WD	195	(United States) Dani Speegle	CAP+1	450
20	(Latvia) Uldis Upenieks	WD	35	(Sweden) Emma Tall	WD	155

=== Event 8: Double Bogey ===
10 rounds

- 8 OHS (135LB/95LB)
- 6 Burpee Over Bar

#	Men	Time	Pts Total	Women	Time	Pts Total
1	(United States) Colten Mertens	5:49.38	455	(United Kingdom) Lucy Campbell	6:15.39	535
2	(United Kingdom) Harry Lightfoot	6:13.90	300	(Canada) Emma Lawson	6:24.90	550
3	(United States) Austin Hatfield	6:16.01	405	(United States) Danielle Brandon	6:35.22	515
4	(Canada) Jeff Adler	6:17.20	635	(Hungary) Laura Horvath	6:36.15	695
5	(United States) Justin Medeiros	6:25.15	615	(Canada) Emily Rolfe	6:36.76	350
6	(Australia) Jay Crouch	6:32.64	565	(Italy) Elisa Fuliano	6:39.92	320
7	(Authorised Neutral Athletes) Roman Khrennikov	6:34.74	565	(United States) Olivia Kerstetter	6:50.87	530
8	(United States) Chandler Smith	6:40.85	420	(United States) Brooke Wells	6:55.56	450
9	(Netherlands) Fabian Hermans	6:42.58	290	(Australia) Grace Walton	6:55.56	430
10	(Iceland) Björgvin Karl Gudmundsson	6:45.62	320	(United States) Abigail Domit	6:58.40	280
11	(United States) Saxon Panchik	6:46.02	330	(United States) Alex Gazan	7:01.09	590
12	(Australia) Ricky Garard	6:49.82	505	(Australia) Madeline Sturt	7:04.09	430
13	(United States) James Sprague	6:55.30	555	(Belgium) Manon Angonese	7:10.48	375
14	(Finland) Jonne Koski	7:12.30	330	(United States) Paige Rodgers	7:12.20	415
15	(Finland) Henrik Haapalainen	7:12.65	405	(United States) Dani Speegle	7:14.16	480
16	(Canada) Patrick Vellner	7:15.21	540	(United States) Alexis Raptis	7:14.75	395
17	(United States) Jayson Hopper	7:17.14	545	(United States) Paige Semenza	7:34.03	235
18	(Brazil) Guilherme Malheiros	7:35.28	320	(United States) Haley Adams	8:02.18	165
19	(United States) Samuel Kwant	WD	195	(United States) Arielle Loewen	8:50.17	465
20	(Latvia) Uldis Upenieks	WD	35	(Sweden) Emma Tall	WD	155

=== Event 9: Pedicab ===
For Time

- 100 meter carry (150LB/100LB)
- 50 Cal Bike
- 100 meter carry

#	Men	Time	Pts Total	Women	Time	Pts Total
1	(Authorised Neutral Athletes) Roman Khrennikov	3:11.47	665	(Australia) Grace Walton	4:27.62	530
2	(United States) James Sprague	3:23.50	650	(Canada) Emily Rolfe	4:29.85	445
3	(Australia) Ricky Garard	3:30.53	595	(United Kingdom) Lucy Campbell	4:30.57	625
4	(United States) Jayson Hopper	3:32.04	630	(United States) Alex Gazan	4:36.50	675
5	(Canada) Jeff Adler	3:43.98	715	(United States) Olivia Kerstetter	4:36.75	610
6	(Australia) Jay Crouch	3:51.13	640	(United States) Danielle Brandon	4:43.21	590
7	(United States) Justin Medeiros	3:53.43	685	(Canada) Emma Lawson	4:43.90	620
8	(Netherlands) Fabian Hermans	3:53.91	355	(Hungary) Laura Horvath	4:45.55	760
9	(United States) Austin Hatfield	3:56.30	465	(United States) Alexis Raptis	4:47.39	455
10	(Finland) Jonne Koski	4:03.58	385	(United States) Brooke Wells	4:57.02	505
11	(Finland) Henrik Haapalainen	4:07.13	455	(United States) Haley Adams	5:08.41	215
12	(Brazil) Guilherme Malheiros	4:07.20	365	(Belgium) Manon Angonese	5:11.93	420
13	(United States) Chandler Smith	4:10.54	460	(Australia) Madeline Sturt	5:14.22	470
14	(United Kingdom) Harry Lightfoot	4:14.23	335	(United States) Dani Speegle	5:15.98	515
15	(Iceland) Björgvin Karl Gudmundsson	4:14.77	350	(United States) Arielle Loewen	5:21.61	495
16	(United States) Colten Mertens	4:23.78	480	(United States) Paige Rodgers	5:27.24	440
17	(Canada) Patrick Vellner	4:32.55	560	(United States) Paige Semenza	5:34.88	255
18	(United States) Saxon Panchik	4:41.76	345	(United States) Abigail Domit	5:34.98	295
19	(United States) Samuel Kwant	WD	195	(Italy) Elisa Fuliano	6:39.92	330
20	(Latvia) Uldis Upenieks	WD	35	(Sweden) Emma Tall	WD	155

=== Final standings ===
Men
#	Name	Pts
1	(Canada) Jeffrey Adler	750
2	(United States) Justin Medeiros	715
3	(Authorised Neutral Athletes) Roman Khrennikov	670
4	(United States) James Sprague	650
5	(Australia) Jay Crouch	650
6	(United States) Jayson Hopper	600
7	(Australia) Ricky Garard	565
8	(Canada) Patrick Vellner	510
9	(United States) Colten Mertens	510
10	(United States) Austin Hatfield	475
11	(United States) Chandler Smith	455
12	(Finland) Henrik Haapalainen	410
13	(Finland) Jonne Koski	395
14	(Brazil) Guilherme Malheiros	365
15	(Netherlands) Fabian Hermans	355
16	(Iceland) Björgvin Karl Gudmundsson	335
17	(United States) Saxon Panchik	330
18	(United Kingdom) Harry Lightfoot	260
19	(United States) Samuel Kwant	250
20	(Latvia) Uldis Upenieks	155

Women
#	Name	Pts
1	(Hungary) Laura Horvath	850
2	(United States) Alex Gazan	790
3	(United Kingdom) Lucy Campbell	570
4	(Canada) Emma Lawson	565
5	(United States) Olivia Kerstetter	540
6	(United States) Danielle Brandon	505
7	(Australia) Grace Walton	500
8	(United States) Dani Speegle	480
9	(United States) Brooke Wells	480
10	(United States) Arielle Loewen	475
11	(Australia) Madeline Sturt	450
12	(United States) Alexis Raptis	450
13	(Canada) Emily Rolfe	440
14	(United States) Paige Rodgers	435
15	(Belgium) Manon Angonese	425
16	(Italy) Elisa Fuliano	380
17	(United States) Abigail Domit	315
18	(United States) Paige Semenza	295
19	(United States) Haley Adams	265
20	(Sweden) Emma Tall	210

== Strongman and strongwoman ==
=== Final standings ===
Men
Rank	Athlete	Points
1st place, gold medalist(s)	(Canada) Mitchell Hooper	52
2nd place, silver medalist(s)	(United States) Trey Mitchell	45.5
3rd place, bronze medalist(s)	(Scotland) Tom Stoltman	38.5
4	(United States) Lucas Hatton	37.5
5	(United States) Bryce Johnson	34.5
5	(United States) Thomas Evans	34.5
7	(United States) Austin Andrade	30
8	(South Africa) Rayno Nel	28.5
9	(United Kingdom) Paddy Haynes	21

Women
Rank	Athlete	Points
1st place, gold medalist(s)	(Puerto Rico) Inez Carrasquillo	50
2nd place, silver medalist(s)	(Ukraine) Olga Liashchuk	43.5
3rd place, bronze medalist(s)	(United States) Angelica Jardine	39
4	(United States) Hannah Linzay	38.5
5	(United Kingdom) Lucy Underdown	35
6	(United Kingdom) Andrea Thompson	32.5
7	(United Kingdom) Rebecca Roberts	28
8	(Canada) Melissa Peacock	23
9	(United States) Jennifer Lyle	22.5
10	(Canada) Samantha Belliveau	17
