= Luke Richardson (strength athlete) =

British strongman (born 1997)

Personal information
- Born: 20 June 1997 (age 29) Harrogate
- Height: 190 cm (6 ft 3 in)
- Weight: 155 kg (342 lb)

Sport
- Sport: Powerlifter, Strongman
Medal record
Representing United Kingdom
Strongman
World's Strongest Man
9th	2020 World's Strongest Man
Qualified	2021 World's Strongest Man
Qualified	2025 World's Strongest Man
Qualified	2026 World's Strongest Man
Europe's Strongest Man
1st	2020 Europe's Strongest Man
1st	2025 Europe's Strongest Man
7th	2026 Europe's Strongest Man
Giants Live
3rd	2024 World Open
3rd	2024 World Tour Finals
1st	2025 World Tour Finals
7th	2026 World Tour Finals
Strongman Champions League
1st	2026 SCL Holland
7th	2026 SCL Ireland
Official Strongman Games
1st	2019 Official Strongman Games
Representing England
Britain's Strongest Man
4th	2020 Britain's Strongest Man
11th	2025 Britain's Strongest Man
England's Strongest Man
1st	2023 England's Strongest Man
4th	2026 England's Strongest Man

Luke Richardson
Medal record
Powerlifting
Representing United Kingdom
European Men's Classic Championships
1st	2017 Junior Europe's	+120kg
1st	2018 Junior Europe's	+120kg
World Men's Classic Championships
2nd	2017 Junior World's	+120kg
1st	2018 Junior World's	+120kg

Luke Richardson (born 20 June 1997) is a British strongman and powerlifter.

== Career ==
Richardson started his career as a powerlifter and was the 2018 Junior 120kg+ champion. He was tied with Pavlo Nakonechnyy, both totaling 1,010.5 kg (2,228 lb) but won outright due to his lower body-weight.

He then switched to strongman and won the 2020 Europe's Strongest Man competition, becoming the youngest winner in the history of that contest. He then competed for the first time at the World's Strongest Man competition, securing 9th place in the finals in 2020. He withdrew from the 2021 competition due to a distal biceps tendon rupture that occurred during the loading medley race in his qualifying heat.

In 2023, Richardson won the 2023 Giants Live version of the England's Strongest Man competition. After a series of injury setbacks, Richardson recorded two Giants Live podium finishes in 2024 at the World Open and World Tour Finals.

In 2025, Richardson won Europe's Strongest Man for the second time. He ended the competition with 51 points from the five events, 3.5 clear of fellow Englishman Paddy Haynes in second. At the World's Strongest Man in 2025, he again failed to reach the finals due to a bicep injury in the first event of the qualifying heat.

In June 2026, Richardson won his first Strongman Champions League event in the Netherlands, recording 52 points from 5 events and heading up Adam Roszkowski and Evans Nana on the podium.

== Personal records ==
In powerlifting:

- Squat (raw with knee sleeves) – 403 kg (888 lb)
- Bench Press (raw) – 222.5 kg (491 lb)
- Deadlift (raw) – 385 kg (849 lb)
- Total – 1,010.5 kg (2,228 lb)

In strongman:

- Wagon wheel Deadlift (18 inches from the floor) – 400 kg (882 lb) (2020 World's Strongest Man)
- Log press – 190 kg (419 lb) (2025 Giants Live World Tour Finals)
- Squat – 317.5 kg (700 lb) x 16 reps (2026 World's Strongest Man)
- Hercules Hold – 160 kg (353 lb) per hand for 74.48 seconds (2020 Europe's Strongest Man)
- Atlas Stones run (heavy set) – 120–200 kg (265–441 lb) 5 stones in 25.96 seconds (2025 Europe's Strongest Man)
- Atlas Stones run (light set) – 100–180 kg (220–397 lb) 5 stones in 19.44 seconds (2020 Europe's Strongest Man)

In training:

- Deadlift (with suit and straps) – 425 kg (937 lb) for 2 reps
- Axle deadlift (with suit and straps) – 400 kg (882 lb) for 3 reps

== Competitive record ==
Winning percentage: 35.71%
Podium percentage: 50.00%

	1st	2nd	3rd	Podium	4th	5th	6th	7th	8th	9th	10th	30th	Total
International competitions	5	0	2	7	0	0	0	2	0	1	0	1	14

== Filmography ==
=== Television ===
Year	Title	Role	Notes
2020–2021, 2025-2026	World's Strongest Man	Himself – Competitor	
