= Chris van der Linde =

South African strongman

Personal information
- Nationality: South African
- Born: 29 March 1991 (age 35)
- Occupation: Strongman
- Height: 6 ft 0.5 in (1.84 m)
- Weight: 168–186 kg (370–410 lb)
Medal record
Strongman
Representing South Africa
World's Strongest Man
| Qualified | 2021 World's Strongest Man |
Africa's Strongest Man
| 1st | 2019 Africa's Strongest Man |
| 2nd | 2020 Africa's Strongest Man |
| 4th | 2021 Africa's Strongest Man |
| 3rd | 2023 Africa's Strongest Man |

Chris van der Linde (born 29 March 1991) is a South African Strongman competitor from Bloemfontein, South Africa. The winner of 2019 Africa's Strongest Man competition, van der Linde was selected to the World's Strongest Man competition in 2021 held in Sacramento, California.

He is the reigning African deadlift record holder.

== Personal records ==
- Deadlift – 455 kg (1,003 lb) (African Record)

→ van der Linde also held the previous record when he deadlifted 440 kg (970 lb), surpassing Eben le Roux's 420 kg (926 lb) which was unbeaten for five years

- Log press – 190 kg (419 lb)
- Axle press – 175 kg (386 lb) (South African Record)
