= 2025 World's Strongest Man =

Strongman competition in 2025

Competition information
- Dates: 15-18 May 2025
- Location: Sacramento, California
- Country: United States
- Athletes participating: 25
- Nations participating: 11

Champion(s)
- (South Africa) Rayno Nel

The 2025 World's Strongest Man was the 48th World's Strongest Man competition. It was won by Rayno Nel.

== Participants ==
- Tom Stoltman (UK)
- Pavlo Kordiyaka (UKR)
- Trey Mitchell (USA)
- Mitchell Hooper (CAN)
- Maxime Boudreault (CAN)
- Luke Richardson (UK)
- Eddie Williams (AUS)
- Tristain Hoath (CAN)
- Austin Andrade (MEX)
- Nick Guardione (USA)
- Evans Aryee (GHA)
- Evan Singleton (USA)
- Bryce Johnson (USA)
- Mathew Ragg (NZL)
- Lucas Hatton (USA)
- Thomas Evans (USA)
- Andrew Flynn (UK)
- Shane Flowers (UK)
- Luke Stoltman (UK)
- Wesley Derwinsky (CAN)
- Ondřej Fojtů (CZE)
- Paddy Haynes (UK)
- Rayno Nel (RSA)
- Jaco Schoonwinkel (RSA)
- Mateusz Kieliszkowski (POL)

== Format change ==
There was a reduction from 30 to 25 athletes with them divided into 5 groups of 5, with the top 2 athletes from each group progressing to the final of 10.

Unlike previous editions going back to 2016, after the fourth event, the athlete in first place will no longer automatically go through to the final, and second and third place will no longer compete against each other in the stone-off. Instead, athletes will have to complete all five events to decide the two qualifiers to go into the finals. As the athletes who made it to the final competed in the same events, their performances in the heats events will then be compared. This will then lead to the best-performing athlete going into the final with 10 points, with each step down in place earning one less point than the previous.

== Heats results ==
Qualifying took place on May 15 and 16.

=== Events ===
- Loading medley: 4 sacks weighing 130 kilograms (290 lb) from 5 metres (16 ft), 10 metres (33 ft), 15 metres (49 ft) and 20 metres (66 ft). 1 minute 15 second time limit.
- Deadlift for repetitions: 350 kilograms (770 lb). 1 minute time limit.
- Overhead medley: 2 dumbbells weighing 90 kilograms (200 lb), 2 logs weighing 145 kilograms (320 lb), 2 circus barbells weighing 154 kilograms (340 lb) and an axle weighing 168 kilograms (370 lb). 1 minute 15 second time limit.
- Titan's toss: 10 bags weighing 14 kilograms (31 lb) over a 3.65 metres (12.0 ft) bar with 2 from 7 metres (23 ft), 2 from 8 metres (26 ft), 2 from 9 metres (30 ft), 2 from 10 metres (33 ft) and 1 from both 11 metres (36 ft) and 12 metres (39 ft). 1 minute time limit.
- Stone medley: 123 kilograms (271 lb) stone press, 158 kilograms (348 lb) stone to shoulder, 176 kilograms (388 lb) husafell carry for 20 metres (66 ft) and then a 182 kilograms (401 lb) stone load. 1 minute 30 time limit.

=== Heat 1 ===
| # | Athlete | Event 1 Loading medley | Event 2 Deadlift for reps | Event 3 Overhead medley | Event 4 Titan's toss | Event 5 Stone medley | Pts |
|---|---|---|---|---|---|---|---|
| 1 | (United Kingdom) Tom Stoltman | 1st - 4 in 38.71 | 1st - 7 | 1st - 7 in 56.95 | 1st - 10 in 31.97 | 3rd - 2 in 1:05.88 | 22.5 |
| 2 | (Australia) Eddie Williams | 2nd - 4 in 44.70 | 1st - 7 | 5th - 4 in 41.11 | 2nd - 8 in 35.66 | 2nd - 2 + 8.87 m | 17.5 |
| 3 | (South Africa) Jaco Schoonwinkel | 4th - 4 in 50.34 | 3rd - 6 | 4th - 5 in 1:06.86 | 3rd - 7 in 25.03 | 4th - 1 in 12.44 | 11.5 |
| 4 | (United States) Thomas Evans | 3rd - 4 in 48.58 | 3rd - 6 | 2nd - 7 in 1:05.11 | 4th - 7 in 29.06 | N/A - 0 in 1:30.00 | 11.5 |
| 5 | (Mexico) Austin Andrade | 5th - 4 in 53.33 | 5th - 5 | 3rd - 7 in 1:13.81 | 5th - 7 in 31.28 | 1st - 4 in 1:25.69 | 11 |

=== Heat 2 ===
| # | Athlete | Event 1 Loading medley | Event 2 Deadlift for reps | Event 3 Overhead medley | Event 4 Titan's toss | Event 5 Stone medley | Pts |
|---|---|---|---|---|---|---|---|
| 1 | (Canada) Mitchell Hooper | 1st - 4 in 38.60 | 2nd - 7 | 1st - 7 in 59.74 | 3rd - 8 in 27.97 | 1st - 4 in 56.22 | 20.5 |
| 2 | (United Kingdom) Paddy Haynes | 2nd - 4 in 41.26 | 1st - 8 | 3rd - 5 in 1:04.40 | 4th - 6 in 18.72 | 2nd - 3 in 82.03 | 18 |
| 3 | (United States) Bryce Johnson | 5th - 4 in 51.83 | 2nd - 7 | 2nd - 6 in 1:05.54 | 5th - 4 in 17.75 | 3rd - 2 in 45.53 | 11.5 |
| 4 | (Canada) Wesley Derwinsky | 4th - 4 in 49.14 | 2nd - 7 | 4th - 5 in 1:05.14 | 1st - 9 in 29.88 | N/A - 0 in 1:30.00 | 11.5 |
| 5 | (New Zealand) Mathew Ragg | 3rd - 4 in 43.79 | 2nd - 7 | 5th - 4 in 31.07 | 2nd - 9 in 32.22 | N/A - 0 in 1:30.00 | 10.5 |

=== Heat 3 ===
| # | Athlete | Event 1 Loading medley | Event 2 Deadlift for reps | Event 3 Overhead medley | Event 4 Titan's toss | Event 5 Stone medley | Pts |
|---|---|---|---|---|---|---|---|
| 1 | (South Africa) Rayno Nel | 2nd - 4 in 42.36 | 1st - 8 | 2nd - 5 in 36.81 | 2nd - 8 in 29.41 | 1st - 4 in 1:02.00 | 22 |
| 2 | (United Kingdom) Shane Flowers | 1st - 4 in 40.13 | 4th - 6 | 4th - 5 in 52.74 | 1st - 8 in 23.38 | 2nd - 1 in 11.38 | 18 |
| 3 | (United States) Lucas Hatton | 5th - 4 in 48.09 | 2nd - 7 | 1st - 6 in 47.41 | 3rd - 8 in 44.06 | 4th - 1 in 16.72 | 14.5 |
| 4 | (Ghana) Evans Aryee | 3rd - 4 in 44.90 | 2nd - 7 | 3rd - 5 in 48.91 | 5th - 6 in 23.66 | 3rd - 1 in 13.47 | 13.5 |
| 5 | (Poland) Mateusz Kieliszkowski | 4th - 4 in 46.28 | N/A - 0 | 5th - 4 in 26.25 | 4th - 7 in 31.97 | N/A | 5 |

=== Heat 4 ===
| # | Athlete | Event 1 Loading medley | Event 2 Deadlift for reps | Event 3 Overhead medley | Event 4 Titan's toss | Event 5 Stone medley | Pts |
|---|---|---|---|---|---|---|---|
| 1 | (United States) Trey Mitchell | 3rd - 4 in 49.38 | 1st - 10 | 2nd - 7 in 1:0.54 | 3rd - 6 in 27.22 | 1st - 4 in 1:13.56 | 20 |
| 2 | (Czech Republic) Ondřej Fojtů | 1st - 4 in 42.55 | 3rd - 5 | 1st - 7 in 1:0.21 | 4th - 3 in 11.41 | 2nd - 3 in 1:01.34 | 19 |
| 3 | (Canada) Maxime Boudreault | 2nd - 4 in 42.81 | 4th - 1 | 3rd - 6 in 57.99 | 1st - 10 in 46.91 | 4th - 1 in 9.81 | 16 |
| 4 | (Canada) Tristain Hoath | 4th - 4 in 51.60 | 2nd - 8 | 4th - 6 in 1:13.70 | 2nd - 7 in 29.75 | 3rd - 3 in 1:04.10 | 15 |
| 5 | (United Kingdom) Luke Richardson (Note: Richardson suffered an injury during the first event and took no further part in the competition.) | 5th - 2 in 13.53 | N/A | N/A | N/A | N/A | 1 |

=== Heat 5 ===
| # | Athlete | Event 1 Loading medley | Event 2 Deadlift for reps | Event 3 Overhead medley | Event 4 Titan's toss | Event 5 Stone medley | Pts |
|---|---|---|---|---|---|---|---|
| 1 | (United Kingdom) Luke Stoltman | 2nd - 4 in 41.21 | 4th - 2 | 2nd - 6 in 49.98 | 1st - 9 in 34.81 | 1st - 3 in 1:09.34 | 20 |
| 2 | (Ukraine) Pavlo Kordiyaka | 1st - 4 in 38.61 | 2nd - 4 | 1st - 6 in 46.35 | 4th - 4 in 12.81 | 3rd - 2 in 1:09.88 | 18.5 |
| 3 | (United States) Nick Guardione | 3rd - 4 in 41.34 | 2nd - 4 | 4th - 5 in 1:07.85 | 2nd - 8 in 28.38 | 2nd - 3 in 1:11.84 | 16.5 |
| 4 | (United Kingdom) Andrew Flynn | 4th - 4 in 45.66 | 1st - 6 | 3rd - 5 in 46.99 | 3rd - 6 in 20.16 | 4th - 1 in 1:10.94 | 15 |
| 5 | (United States) Evan Singleton (Note: Singleton suffered an injury during the first event and took no further part in the competition.) | 5th - 2 in 14.25 | N/A | N/A | N/A | N/A | 1 |

=== Finalist points table ===
Once the 10 finalists were confirmed, their results across the events were then compared to create a new leaderboard and award 10 points through to 1.

| # | Athlete | Nation | Points |
|---|---|---|---|
| 1 | Mitchell Hooper | Canada | 10 |
| 2 | Tom Stoltman | United Kingdom | 9 |
| 3 | Rayno Nel | South Africa | 8 |
| 4 | Trey Mitchell | United States | 7 |
| 5 | Luke Stoltman | United Kingdom | 6 |
| 6 | Paddy Haynes | United Kingdom | 5 |
| 7 | Shane Flowers | United Kingdom | 4 |
| 8 | Ondřej Fojtů | Czech Republic | 3 |
| 9 | Pavlo Kordiyaka | Ukraine | 2 |
| 10 | Eddie Williams | Australia | 1 |

== Finals events results ==
The finals took place on May 17 and 18.

=== Event 1: Carry & Hoist ===
- 250 kilograms (550 lb) zercher carry for 20 metres (66 ft) in to a 200 kilograms (440 lb) hoist up 8 metres (26 ft).
- Time limit: 1 minute 15 seconds

| # | Athlete | Nation | Time | Event Points | Overall Points |
|---|---|---|---|---|---|
| 1 | Rayno Nel | South Africa | 30.58 | 10 | 18 |
| 2 | Tom Stoltman | United Kingdom | 34.49 | 9 | 18 |
| 3 | Mitchell Hooper | Canada | 35.47 | 8 | 18 |
| 4 | Paddy Haynes | United Kingdom | 36.97 | 7 | 12 |
| 5 | Pavlo Kordiyaka | Ukraine | 37.42 | 6 | 8 |
| 6 | Eddie Williams | Australia | 38.11 | 5 | 6 |
| 7 | Ondřej Fojtů | Czech Republic | 40.95 | 4 | 7 |
| 8 | Luke Stoltman | United Kingdom | 45.58 | 3 | 9 |
| 9 | Trey Mitchell | United States | 49.38 | 2 | 9 |
| 10 | Shane Flowers | United Kingdom | 8.60 metres (28.2 ft) | 1 | 5 |

=== Event 2: 18-inch Max deadlift ===
| # | Athlete | Nation | Weight | Event Points | Overall Points |
|---|---|---|---|---|---|
| 1 | Trey Mitchell | United States | 500 kilograms (1,110 lb) | 10 | 19 |
| 2 | Rayno Nel | South Africa | 490 kilograms (1,080 lb) | 9 | 27 |
| 3 | Mitchell Hooper | Canada | 465 kilograms (1,025 lb) | 6 | 24 |
| 3 | Tom Stoltman | United Kingdom | 465 kilograms (1,025 lb) | 6 | 24 |
| 3 | Paddy Haynes | United Kingdom | 465 kilograms (1,025 lb) | 6 | 18 |
| 3 | Ondřej Fojtů | Czech Republic | 465 kilograms (1,025 lb) | 6 | 13 |
| 3 | Shane Flowers | United Kingdom | 465 kilograms (1,025 lb) | 6 | 11 |
| 8 | Pavlo Kordiyaka | Ukraine | 435 kilograms (959 lb) | 2.5 | 10.5 |
| 8 | Eddie Williams | Australia | 435 kilograms (959 lb) | 2.5 | 8.5 |
| 10 | Luke Stoltman | United Kingdom | 402 kilograms (886 lb) | 1 | 10 |

=== Event 3: Hercules hold ===
- Weight: 159 kilograms (351 lb) per hand.

| # | Athlete | Nation | Time | Event Points | Overall Points |
|---|---|---|---|---|---|
| 1 | Eddie Williams | Australia | 1:22.14 | 10 | 18.5 |
| 2 | Rayno Nel | South Africa | 1:15.63 | 9 | 36 |
| 3 | Paddy Haynes | United Kingdom | 59.64 | 8 | 26 |
| 4 | Ondřej Fojtů | Czech Republic | 55.41 | 7 | 20 |
| 5 | Shane Flowers | United Kingdom | 40.26 | 6 | 17 |
| 6 | Mitchell Hooper | Canada | 40.09 | 5 | 29 |
| 7 | Luke Stoltman | United Kingdom | 32.30 | 4 | 14 |
| 8 | Tom Stoltman | United Kingdom | 31.82 | 3 | 27 |
| 9 | Pavlo Kordiyaka | Ukraine | 29.91 | 2 | 12.5 |
| 10 | Trey Mitchell | United States | 22.29 | 1 | 20 |

=== Event 4: Max flinstone press ===
| # | Athlete | Nation | Weight | Event Points | Overall Points |
|---|---|---|---|---|---|
| 1 | Tom Stoltman | United Kingdom | 241 kilograms (531 lb) | 9.5 | 36.5 |
| 1 | Trey Mitchell | United States | 241 kilograms (531 lb) | 9.5 | 29.5 |
| 3 | Mitchell Hooper | Canada | 230 kilograms (510 lb) | 7.5 | 36.5 |
| 3 | Pavlo Kordiyaka | Ukraine | 230 kilograms (510 lb) | 7.5 | 20 |
| 5 | Ondřej Fojtů | Czech Republic | 220 kilograms (490 lb) | 6 | 26 |
| 6 | Shane Flowers | United Kingdom | 200 kilograms (440 lb) | 4.5 | 21.5 |
| 6 | Luke Stoltman | United Kingdom | 200 kilograms (440 lb) | 4.5 | 18.5 |
| 8 | Rayno Nel | South Africa | 188 kilograms (414 lb) | 3 | 39 |
| — | Paddy Haynes | United Kingdom | No lift | 0 | 26 |
| — | Eddie Williams | Australia | No lift | 0 | 17.5 |

=== Event 5: Atlas stones ===
- Weight: 5 stones ranging from 140–210 kilograms (310–460 lb)
- Time Limit: 1 minute

| # | Athlete | Nation | Time | Event Points | Overall Points |
|---|---|---|---|---|---|
| 1 | Tom Stoltman | United Kingdom | 5 in 31.76 | 10 | 46.5 |
| 2 | Trey Mitchell | United States | 5 in 41.08 | 9 | 38.5 |
| 3 | Rayno Nel | South Africa | 4 in 30.17 | 8 | 47 |
| 4 | Mitchell Hooper | Canada | 4 in 31.02 | 7 | 43.5 |
| 5 | Paddy Haynes | United Kingdom | 4 in 34.07 | 6 | 32 |
| 6 | Pavlo Kordiyaka | Ukraine | 4 in 38.39 | 5 | 25 |
| 7 | Shane Flowers | United Kingdom | 4 in 54.09 | 4 | 25.5 |
| 8 | Luke Stoltman | United Kingdom | 3 in 25.88 | 3 | 21.5 |
| 9 | Eddie Williams | Australia | 3 in 25.88 | 2 | 20.5 |
| 10 | Ondřej Fojtů | Czech Republic | 3 in 25.05 | 1 | 27 |

== Final results ==
| # | Athlete | Nation | Points |
|---|---|---|---|
| 1st place, gold medalist(s) | Rayno Nel | South Africa | 47 |
| 2nd place, silver medalist(s) | Tom Stoltman | United Kingdom | 46.5 |
| 3rd place, bronze medalist(s) | Mitchell Hooper | Canada | 43.5 |
| 4 | Trey Mitchell | United States | 38.5 |
| 5 | Paddy Haynes | United Kingdom | 32 |
| 6 | Ondřej Fojtů | Czech Republic | 27 |
| 7 | Shane Flowers | United Kingdom | 25.5 |
| 8 | Pavlo Kordiyaka | Ukraine | 25 |
| 9 | Luke Stoltman | United Kingdom | 21.5 |
| 10 | Eddie Williams | Australia | 20.5 |

| Preceded by 2024 World's Strongest Man | 2025 World's Strongest Man | Succeeded by 2026 World's Strongest Man |
