= Paddy Haynes =

British strongman (born 1997)

Personal information
- Born: 1 July 1997 (age 29)
- Height: 191 cm (6 ft 3 in)
- Weight: 135 kg (298 lb)

Sport
- Sport: Powerlifter, Strongman
Medal record
Representing United Kingdom
Strongman
World's Strongest Man
5th	2025 World's Strongest Man
Qualified	2026 World's Strongest Man
Rogue Invitational
9th	2025 Rogue Invitational
5th	2026 Rogue Invitational
Europe's Strongest Man
2nd	2025 Europe's Strongest Man
4th	2026 Europe's Strongest Man
Giants Live
10th	2024 World Open
3rd	2025 Strongman Classic
4th	2025 World Open
2nd	2026 Strongman Classic
Iceland's Strongest Man
2nd	2025 Iceland's Strongest Man
Aaron Page Classic
1st	2024 Aaron Page Classic
Representing England
Britain's Strongest Man
10th	2024 Britain's Strongest Man
4th	2025 Britain's Strongest Man
3rd	2026 Britain's Strongest Man
England's Strongest Man
3rd	2024 England's Strongest Man
1st	2025 England's Strongest Man
12th	2026 England's Strongest Man

Patrick "Paddy" Haynes (born 1 July 1997) is a strongman competitor and personal trainer from the United Kingdom.

== Early life ==
Haynes was raised on a family farm in Adderbury, Oxfordshire, England. From 2015 to 2019 he attended the University of Portsmouth, from which he graduated with a Bachelor's in Accounting & Finance and a Master's in Forensic Accounting.

== Athletic career ==
Haynes was originally a long distance runner, competing in ultramarathons whilst at university. He then retrained to become a professional strongman, increasing his weight from 68 kg (150 lb) as a runner, to 130 kg (287 lb).

Haynes won 2023 England's Strongest Man, Ultimate Strongman version in Warrington, and 2025 England's Strongest Man Giants Live version in York Barbican. He won second place at 2025 Europe's Strongest Man competition and emerged runner up to Hafþór Júlíus Björnsson in 2025 Iceland's Strongest Man. Haynes was, in his first appearance, a finalist in the 2025 edition of the World's Strongest Man competition, finishing in fifth place. However in 2026 edition he failed to make it to the finals, ending up 24th out of 25 athletes.

== Personal records ==
- Deadlift (standard bar with figure 8 straps and multi-ply suit) – 453.5 kg (1,000 lb) (2025 World Deadlift Championships)
- Log press – 160 kg (353 lb) (2025 Iceland's Strongest Man)
- Atlas stones – 5 stones 120–200 kg (265–441 lb) in 22.88 seconds (2025 Giants Live Strongman Classic)
- Húsafell Stone carry (around the pen) – 186 kg (410 lb) for 109.95 metres (360 ft 9 in) (around 3.2 revolutions) (2025 Iceland's Strongest Man) (world record)
- Conan's Wheel – 200 kg (441 lb) for 1106° (2026 Giants Live Strongman Classic) (world record)

== Competitive record ==
Podium percentage: 30.00%

	1st	2nd	3rd	Podium	4th	5th	6th	7th	8th	9th	10th	24th	Total
International competitions	0	2	1	3	3	1	0	0	0	1	1	1	10
