= Giants Live =

Strongman competition series

- The official logo of Giants Live

Tournament information
- Location: Various
- Established: 2009
- Format: Multi-event competition
- Purse: varies

Giants Live is a professional strongman tour which was originated in the United Kingdom. It hosts several prominent competitions each year, including national competitions such as Britain's Strongest Man, international competitions such as Europe's Strongest Man and single-lift competitions such as The World Deadlift Championships and The World Log Lift Championships. Since its beginning in 2009, each Giants Live show has served as a qualifier for the next year's World's Strongest Man, with the podium finishers from each show earning a spot in the competition.

With 11 wins, Hafþór Júlíus Björnsson holds the most Giants Live wins in history. Evan Singleton and Žydrūnas Savickas share second place with 6 wins each.

== History ==
On 27 April 2009, Giants Live was named the official World's Strongest Man Qualifying Tour for 2009–2011, replacing the Strongman Super Series. Giants Live was licensed the exclusive rights by IMG Sports Media, the creator and owner of the World's Strongest Man competition. The IFSA Strongman Super Series and later the World's Strongest Man Super Series had served as the official qualifying tour from 2001 to 2008.

Significantly, Giants Live offered an opportunity for strongmen who had previously been affiliated with the IFSA to return to World's Strongest Man. IFSA athletes were banned from competing in World's Strongest Man from 2004 until its dissolution in 2007; this meant that notable athletes such as Zydrunas Savickas and Mikhail Koklyaev were unable to compete during this time. With the dissolution of the IFSA and the beginning of Strongman Champions League, many previously IFSA-affiliated athletes returned to competition at World's Strongest Man..

The first 2009 qualifying event took place on 17 May at the Mohegan Sun Casino Arena in Uncasville, Connecticut.

== Producers and key staff ==
Giants Live is a collaboration between IMG Media and Power Productions UK owned. Notable staff include:

- (Scotland) Colin Bryce – an ex-Strongman competitor and Olympic bobsleigher, Bryce is currently a long-term producer of World Strongest Man through his company Power Productions and formerly the head referee and commentator on strongman events such as World's Strongest Man, Britain's Strongest Man, Strongman Super Series and World Strongman Cup. Since 2nd July it was confirmed Colin is no longer Director of Giants Live, with Darren Sadler taking his place as Director
- (England) Darren Sadler – an ex-Strongman competitor and former world champion in the U105 category, Sadler is currently a co-producer of World Strongest Man alongside Colin Bryce and formerly the head referee on for Giants Live competitions.
- (Iceland) Magnús Ver Magnússon – an ex-Strongman competitor and four-time holder of World's Strongest Man, Magnússon is currently the head referee for Giants Live and World's Strongest Man competitions.
- (United States) Bill Kazmaier – an ex-Strongman competitor and three-time holder of World's Strongest Man, Kazmaier is currently one of three main commentators for Giants Live competitions, alongside Neil Pickup and Radzi Chinyanganya.
- (England) Dave Warner – Ex strongman competitor and multiple time UK strongest man competitor. One of the head judges. Judged Eddie's 500kg deadlift
- (England) Neil Pickup – formerly a professional arm wrestler, Pickup is currently one of three main commentators for Giants Live competitions, alongside Bill Kazmaier and Radzi Chinyanganya. Pickup is also the MC for these events.
- (England) Radzi Chinyanganya – Radzi is currently one of three main commentators for Giants Live competitions, alongside Neil Pickup and Bill Kazmaier.
- (England) Will Clough – Live Stream Director
- (England) Lindsi Baldwin – Event Co-Ordinator
- (England) Nev & Neo – Team behind the live feed

== Event results ==
Year	Event	Type	Date	Champion	Runner-up	3rd Place
2009	(United States) Mohegan Sun Grand Prix; Mohegan Sun Casino Arena, Uncasville	Indoor	Sunday, 17 May 2009	(United States) Derek Poundstone	(United States) Travis Ortmayer	(United States) Brian Shaw
2009	(Norway) Viking Power Challenge; Kongeparken, Stavanger	Indoor	Saturday, 6 June 2009	(United States) Travis Ortmayer	(Norway) Richard Skog	(Russia) Mikhail Koklyaev
2009	Giants Live Poland; Castle of the Teutonic Order in Malbork, Malbork	Outdoor	Saturday, 1 August 2009	(Poland) Jarek Dymek	(England) Mark Felix	(Iceland) Stefán Sölvi Pétursson
2010	Giants Live South Africa; Expo Centre Johannesburg, Johannesburg	Indoor	Sunday, 10 April 2010	(United States) Brian Shaw	(Russia) Mikhail Koklyaev	(England) Terry Hollands
2010	(Ukraine) Giants Live Kyiv; People's Friendship Arch, Kyiv	Outdoor	Sunday, 30 May 2010	(United States) Derek Poundstone (2)	(England) Laurence Shahlaei	(Sweden) Johannes Årsjö
2010	(England) Europe's Strongest Man; Wembley Arena, London	Indoor	Saturday, 19 June 2010	(Lithuania) Žydrūnas Savickas	(England) Terry Hollands	(England) Mark Felix
2010	Giants Live Poland; MotoArena Toruń, Toruń	Indoor	Sunday, 8 August 2010	(Lithuania) Vytautas Lalas	(Poland) Robert Szczepański	(Poland) Janusz Kułaga
2010	(Turkey) Giants Live Istanbul; KüçükÇiftlik Park, Istanbul	Outdoor	Sunday, 24 October 2010	(Lithuania) Žydrūnas Savickas (2)	(United States) Brian Shaw	(Iceland) Stefán Sölvi Pétursson
2011	(England) Giants Live London; ExCeL London, London	Indoor	Saturday, 19 March 2011	(United States) Brian Shaw (2)	(England) Laurence Shahlaei	(Lithuania) Vytautas Lalas
2011	Giants Live Finland Qualifier; Pori	Outdoor	Friday, 13 May 2011	(Finland) Juha-Matti Järvi	(Finland) Antti Mourujärvi	(Finland) Pedro Karlsen
2011	Giants Live Finland Qualifier; Masku	Outdoor	Saturday, 21 May 2011	(Finland) Juha-Matti Järvi (2)	(Finland) Kai Pasanen	(Finland) Jarno Kirselä
2011	Giants Live Finland Qualifier; Jyväskylä	Outdoor	Saturday, 28 May 2011	(Finland) Juha-Matti Järvi (3)	(Finland) Jarno Kirselä	(Finland) Kai Pasanen
2011	Giants Live Finland Qualifier; Oulu	Outdoor	Saturday, 28 May 2011	(Finland) Juha-Matti Järvi (4)	(Finland) Jarno Kirselä	(Finland) Janne Illikainen
2011	Giants Live Poland; Plac, Stróże	Outdoor	Saturday, 6 August 2011	(Poland) Krzysztof Radzikowski	(United States) Mike Jenkins	(Poland) Mateusz Baron
2011	Giants Live Finland; Power Park, Vaasa	Outdoor	Saturday, 13 August 2011	(Austria) Martin Wildauer	(Lithuania) Vidas Blekaitis	(Estonia) Rauno Heinla
2011	Giants Live Ukraine; Poltava	Outdoor	Wednesday, 24 August 2011	(Ukraine) Serhiy Romanchuk	(England) Mark Felix	(United States) Josh Thigpen
2012	(Australia) Giants Live FitX Melbourne; Melbourne Centre, Melbourne	Indoor	Sunday, 18 March 2012	(United States) Mike Jenkins	(United States) Nick Best	(United States) Mike Burke
2012	Giants Live Finland; Ideapark, Lempäälä	Indoor	Sunday, 10 June 2012	(England) Laurence Shahlaei	(Sweden) Johannes Årsjö	(Estonia) Lauri Nämi
2012	Giants Live Hungary; Aquaworld Resort Budapest, Budapest	Outdoor	Sunday, 17 June 2012	(Hungary) Ákos Nagy	(England) Jack McIntosh	(United States) Josh Thigpen
2012	(England) Europe's Strongest Man; Elland Road, Leeds	Outdoor	Saturday, 23 June 2012	(Lithuania) Žydrūnas Savickas (3)	(Lithuania) Vytautas Lalas	(England) Laurence Shahlaei
2012	Giants Live Poland; Kartuzy	Outdoor	Saturday, 21 July 2012	(Poland) Krzysztof Radzikowski (2)	(Poland) Mateusz Baron	(Poland) Sebastian Kurek
2013	(Australia) Giants Live FitX Melbourne; Melbourne Centre, Melbourne	Indoor	Sunday, 10 March 2013	(United States) Derek Poundstone (3)	(United States) Nick Best	(South Africa) Frankie Scheun
2013	Giants Live Hungary; Aquaworld Resort Budapest, Budapest	Outdoor	Saturday, 22 June 2013	(United States) Mike Burke	(England) Eddie Hall	(Norway) Bjørn Andre Solvang
2013	(England) Europe's Strongest Man; Elland Road, Leeds	Outdoor	Saturday, 29 June 2013	(Lithuania) Žydrūnas Savickas (4)	(Lithuania) Vytautas Lalas	(Poland) Krzysztof Radzikowski
2013	(Norway) Nordic Championships; Gol	Indoor	Saturday, 6 July 2013	(Sweden) Johannes Årsjö	(Norway) Ole Martin Hansen	(Finland) Juha-Matti Järvi
2013	Giants Live Poland; Pol'and'Rock Festival Grounds, Kostrzyn nad Odrą	Outdoor	Saturday, 3 August 2013	(Lithuania) Vytautas Lalas (2)	(Poland) Krzysztof Radzikowski	(Estonia) Lauri Nämi
2013	(England) Britain's Strongest Man; Gateshead International Stadium, Gateshead	Outdoor	Sunday, 4 August 2013	(England) Laurence Shahlaei (2)	(England) Terry Hollands	(England) Mark Felix
2014	(Australia) Giants Live FitX Melbourne; Melbourne Centre, Melbourne	Indoor	Saturday, 8 March 2014	(Iceland) Hafþór Júlíus Björnsson	(Australia) Warrick Brant	(South Africa) Frankie Scheun
2014	(England) Britain's Strongest Man; The Dome Leisure Centre, Doncaster	Indoor	Sunday, 16 March 2014	(England) Eddie Hall	(England) Graham Hicks	(England) Laurence Shahlaei
2014	(Norway) World's Strongest Viking; Fefor Høifjellshotell, Vinstra	Outdoor	Saturday, 5 April 2014	(Iceland) Hafþór Júlíus Björnsson (2)	(Sweden) David Nyström	(England) Terry Hollands
2014	Giants Live Poland; Dolina Charlotty	Outdoor	Friday, 2 May 2014	(Lithuania) Žydrūnas Savickas (5)	(Poland) Mateusz Baron	(Poland) Rafał Kobylarz
2014	Giants Live Hungary; Aquaworld Resort Budapest, Budapest	Outdoor	Saturday, 21 June 2014	(United States) Jason Bergmann	(Slovenia) Matjaž Belšak	(England) Eddie Hall
2014	(England) Europe's Strongest Man; Headingley Stadium, Leeds	Outdoor	Saturday, 9 August 2014	(Iceland) Hafþór Júlíus Björnsson (3)	(Sweden) Johannes Årsjö	(England) Graham Hicks
2014	Giants Live Sweden; Stadium Arena, Norrköping	Indoor	Saturday, 29 November 2014	(United States) Brian Shaw (3)	(Sweden) Johannes Årsjö	(Sweden) Martin Forsmark
2015
2015	(England) Britain's Strongest Man; The Dome Leisure Centre, Doncaster	Indoor	Saturday, 14 February 2015	(England) Eddie Hall (2)	(England) Mark Felix	(Poland) Krzysztof Radzikowski
2015	(Iceland) Giants Live Viking Challenge; Grindavík	Outdoor	Sunday, 7 June 2015	(Iceland) Hafþór Júlíus Björnsson (4)	(England) Mark Felix	(United States) Martins Licis
2015	(England) Europe's Strongest Man; Headingley Stadium, Leeds	Outdoor	Saturday, 11 July 2015	(Iceland) Hafþór Júlíus Björnsson (5)	(Poland) Krzysztof Radzikowski	(Latvia) Dainis Zageris
2015	Giants Live Sweden; Stadium Arena, Norrköping	Indoor	Saturday, 28 November 2015	(Iceland) Hafþór Júlíus Björnsson (6)	(Sweden) Johannes Årsjö	(England) Mark Felix
2016
2016	(England) Britain's Strongest Man; The Dome Leisure Centre, Doncaster	Indoor	Saturday, 30 January 2016	(England) Eddie Hall (3)	(England) Mark Felix	(England) Laurence Shahlaei
2016	(United States) North American Open; Town Square, Martinsville	Outdoor	Saturday, 26 June 2016	(United States) Nick Best	(England) Mark Felix	(United States) Derek DeVaughn
2016	(England) Europe's Strongest Man; First Direct Arena, Leeds	Indoor	Saturday, 9 July 2016	(England) Laurence Shahlaei (3)	(Iceland) Hafþór Júlíus Björnsson	(Sweden) Johannes Årsjö
2016	Giants Live Sweden; Stadium Arena, Norrköping	Indoor	Saturday, 12 November 2016	(Sweden) Johannes Årsjö	(Sweden) Martin Forsmark	(England) Mark Felix
2017
2017	(England) Britain's Strongest Man; The Dome Leisure Centre, Doncaster	Indoor	Saturday, 28 January 2017	(England) Eddie Hall (4)	(England) Laurence Shahlaei	(England) Graham Hicks
2017	(England) Europe's Strongest Man; First Direct Arena, Leeds	Indoor	Saturday, 1 April 2017	(Iceland) Hafþór Júlíus Björnsson (7)	(England) Eddie Hall	(England) Terry Hollands
2017	(United States) North American Open; Town Square, Martinsville	Outdoor	Saturday, 29 July 2017	(United States) Rob Kearney	(United States) Nick Best	(United States) Adam Derks
2017	(England) Giants Live Finals; Manchester Arena, Manchester	Indoor	Saturday, 29 September 2017	(Lithuania) Žydrūnas Savickas (6)	(Georgia (country)) Konstantine Janashia	(Canada) JF Caron
2017	(Sweden) Scandinavian Open; Stadium Arena, Norrköping	Indoor	Saturday, 11 November 2017	(Sweden) Johannes Årsjö (3)	(Sweden) Johnny Hansson	(Lithuania) Žydrūnas Savickas
2018
2018	(England) Britain's Strongest Man; FlyDSA Arena, Sheffield	Indoor	Saturday, 27 January 2018	(England) Eddie Hall (5)	(England) Graham Hicks	(England) Terry Hollands
2018	(England) Europe's Strongest Man; First Direct Arena, Leeds	Indoor	Saturday, 7 April 2018	(Iceland) Hafþór Júlíus Björnsson (8)	(Georgia (country)) Konstantine Janashia	(Poland) Mateusz Kieliszkowski
2018	(United States) North American Open; Town Square, Martinsville	Outdoor	Sunday, 10 June 2018	(England) Laurence Shahlaei (4)	(United States) Trey Mitchell	(United States) Kevin Faires
2018	(England) Giants Live Finals; Manchester Arena, Manchester	Indoor	Saturday, 15 September 2018	(Poland) Mateusz Kieliszkowski	(United States) Martins Licis	(England) Adam Bishop
2019
2019	(England) Britain's Strongest Man; FlyDSA Arena, Sheffield	Indoor	Saturday, 19 January 2019	(England) Graham Hicks	(England) Adam Bishop	(Scotland) Tom Stoltman
2019	(England) Europe's Strongest Man; First Direct Arena, Leeds	Indoor	Saturday, 6 April 2019	(Iceland) Hafþór Júlíus Björnsson (9)	(Poland) Mateusz Kieliszkowski	(Georgia (country)) Konstantine Janashia
2019	(England) Giants Live Wembley; Wembley Arena, London	Indoor	Saturday, 6 July 2019	(Poland) Mateusz Kieliszkowski (2)	(United States) Jerry Pritchett	(United States) Martins Licis
2019	(United States) North American Open; Town Square, Martinsville	Outdoor	Saturday, 10 August 2019	(United States) Evan Singleton	(United States) Kevin Faires	(England) Mark Felix
2019	(England) Giants Live Finals; Manchester Arena, Manchester	Indoor	Saturday, 7 September 2019	(Poland) Mateusz Kieliszkowski (3)	(Wales) Ben Brunning	(Ukraine) Oleksii Novikov
2019	(United States) Official Strongman Games; Ocean Center, Daytona Beach	Indoor	Sunday, 3 November 2019	(England) Luke Richardson	(Wales) Ben Brunning	(United States) Jacob Fincher
2020
2020	(England) Britain's Strongest Man; FlyDSA Arena, Sheffield	Indoor	Saturday, 18 January 2020	(England) Adam Bishop	(Scotland) Tom Stoltman	(Scotland) Luke Stoltman
2020	(England) Europe's Strongest Man; Allerton Castle, Harrogate	Outdoor	Sunday, 6 September 2020	(England) Luke Richardson (2)	(England) Adam Bishop	(Estonia) Ervin Toots
2021
2021	(England) The Strongman Classic; Royal Albert Hall, London	Indoor	Saturday, 24 July 2021	(Ukraine) Oleksii Novikov	(United States) Evan Singleton	(Burkina Faso) Cheick Sanou
2021	(England) World Open; AO Arena, Manchester	Indoor	Saturday, 14 August 2021	(United States) Evan Singleton (2)	(England) Adam Bishop	(Ukraine) Oleksii Novikov
2021	(England) Europe's Strongest Man; First Direct Arena, Leeds	Indoor	Saturday, 4 September 2021	(Scotland) Luke Stoltman	(Ukraine) Oleksii Novikov	(England) Graham Hicks
2021	(Scotland) Giants Live Finals; SSE Hydro, Glasgow	Indoor	Saturday, 18 September 2021	(Scotland) Luke Stoltman (2)	(Scotland) Tom Stoltman	(United States) Evan Singleton
2021	(England) Arnold Sports Festival UK; The NEC, Birmingham	Indoor	Sunday, 3 October 2021	(United States) Evan Singleton (3)	(Ukraine) Oleksii Novikov	(United States) Trey Mitchell
2021	(England) Britain's Strongest Man; FlyDSA Arena, Sheffield	Indoor	Saturday, 23 October 2021	(Scotland) Tom Stoltman	(England) Adam Bishop	(England) Graham Hicks
2021	(United States) Official Strongman Games; Ocean Center, Daytona Beach	Indoor	Friday, 12 November 2021	(Ukraine) Pavlo Kordiyaka	(United States) Spenser Remick	(United States) Tyler Cotton
2022
2022	(England) Britain's Strongest Man; FlyDSA Arena, Sheffield	Indoor	Saturday, 26 February 2022	(Scotland) Tom Stoltman (2)	(Republic of Ireland) Pa O'Dwyer	(England) Adam Bishop
2022	(England) Europe's Strongest Man; First Direct Arena, Leeds	Indoor	Saturday, 2 April 2022	(Ukraine) Oleksii Novikov (2)	(Scotland) Luke Stoltman	(Georgia (country)) Konstantine Janashia
2022	(England) The Strongman Classic; Royal Albert Hall, London	Indoor	Saturday, 9 July 2022	(Ukraine) Oleksii Novikov (3)	(Canada) Mitchell Hooper	(United States) Evan Singleton
2022	(Wales) The Giants Live Open; Motorpoint Arena, Cardiff	Indoor	Saturday, 6 August 2022	(Ukraine) Pavlo Nakonechnyy	(Canada) Mitchell Hooper	(Ukraine) Oleksii Novikov
2022	(Scotland) Giants Live Finals; OVO Hydro, Glasgow	Indoor	Saturday, 8 October 2022	(Canada) Mitchell Hooper	(Latvia) Aivars Šmaukstelis	(United States) Kevin Faires
2022	(England) World's Strongest Nation; M&S Bank Arena, Liverpool	Indoor	Saturday, 26 November 2022	(United Kingdom) Team UK	(United States) Team USA	
2023
2023	(England) Britain's Strongest Man; FlyDSA Arena, Sheffield	Indoor	Saturday, 28 January 2023	(England) Adam Bishop (2)	(Wales) Gavin Bilton	(England) Graham Hicks
2023	(England) Europe's Strongest Man; First Direct Arena, Leeds	Indoor	Saturday, 1 April 2023	(Ukraine) Pavlo Kordiyaka (2)	(Ukraine) Oleksii Novikov	(Latvia) Aivars Šmaukstelis
2023	(England) Giants Live Strongman Classic; Royal Albert Hall, London	Indoor	Saturday, 8 July 2023	(United States) Evan Singleton (4)	(Scotland) Tom Stoltman	(Canada) Mitchell Hooper
2023	(Wales) The Strongman Open; Cardiff International Arena, Cardiff	Indoor	Saturday, 2 September 2023	(United States) Evan Singleton (5)	(Wales) Gavin Bilton	(England) Shane Flowers
2023	(England) Britain's Strongest Woman; Doncaster Dome, Doncaster	Indoor	Saturday, 30 September 2023	(Wales) Rebecca Roberts	(England) Lucy Underdown	(England) Andrea Thompson
2023	England's Strongest Man; Doncaster Dome, Doncaster	Indoor	Sunday, 1 October 2023	(England) Luke Richardson (3)	(England) Kane Francis	(England) Paddy Haynes
2023	(Scotland) Giant's Live Finals; OVO Hydro, Glasgow	Indoor	Saturday, 21 October 2023	(Scotland) Tom Stoltman (3)	(New Zealand) Mathew Ragg	(Canada) Mitchell Hooper
2023	(England) World's Strongest Nation; M&S Bank Arena, Liverpool	Indoor	Saturday, 18 November 2023	(United States) Team USA	(United Kingdom) Team UK	
2024
2024	(England) Britain's Strongest Man; FlyDSA Arena, Sheffield	Indoor	Saturday, 27 January 2024	(Scotland) Tom Stoltman (4)	(Wales) Gavin Bilton	(Scotland) Luke Stoltman
2024	(England) Europe's Strongest Man; First Direct Arena, Leeds	Indoor	Saturday, 13 April 2024	(Scotland) Luke Stoltman (3)	(Latvia) Aivars Šmaukstelis	(Ukraine) Oleksii Novikov
2024	England's Strongest Man; York Barbican, York	Indoor	Saturday, 22 June 2024	(England) Kane Francis	(England) Andrew Flynn	(England) Paddy Haynes
2024	(England) Britain's Strongest Woman; York Barbican, York	Indoor	Saturday, 22 June 2024	(England) Lucy Underdown	(Wales) Rebecca Roberts	(England) Donna Moore
2024	(England) The Strongman Classic; Royal Albert Hall, London	Indoor	Saturday, 13 July 2024	(Canada) Mitchell Hooper (2)	(Scotland) Tom Stoltman	(Ukraine) Pavlo Kordiyaka
2024	(England) Official Strongman European Championships; Barbican Theatre, York	Indoor	Saturday/Sunday, 17/18 August 2024	(Ukraine) Roman Grekov	(England) Ben Glasscock	(Poland) Marek Czakjkowski
2024	(England) The Strongman Open; Utilita Arena, Birmingham	Indoor	Saturday, 7 September 2024	(Canada) Mitchell Hooper (3)	(Canada) Maxime Boudreault	(England) Luke Richardson
2024	(United States) US Strongman Championship; Orleans Arena, Las Vegas	Indoor	Saturday, 28 September 2024	(Canada) Mitchell Hooper (4)	(United States) Trey Mitchell	(Australia) Eddie Williams
2024	(Scotland) Giants Live Finals; OVO Hydro, Glasgow	Indoor	Saturday, 19 October 2024	(Canada) Mitchell Hooper (5)	(United States) Trey Mitchell	(England) Luke Richardson
2025
2025	(England) Britain's Strongest Man; FlyDSA Arena, Sheffield	Indoor	Saturday, 1 February 2025	(Scotland) Luke Stoltman (4)	(England) Shane Flowers	(England) Andrew Flynn
2025	(England) Europe's Strongest Man; First Direct Arena, Leeds	Indoor	Saturday, 5 April 2025	(England) Luke Richardson (4)	(England) Paddy Haynes	(Poland) Mateusz Kieliszkowski
2025	(England) The Strongman Classic; Royal Albert Hall, London	Indoor	Saturday, 5 July 2025	(United States) Evan Singleton (6)	(South Africa) Jaco Schoonwinkel	(England) Paddy Haynes
2025	(England) Britain's Strongest Woman; York Barbican, York	Indoor	Saturday, 19 July 2025	(England) Lucy Underdown (2)	(Wales) Rebecca Roberts	(England) Naomi Hadley
2025	England's Strongest Man; York Barbican, York	Indoor	Sunday, 20 July 2025	(England) Paddy Haynes	(England) Andrew Flynn	(England) Kane Francis
2025	(England) Official Strongman Games European Championship; Barbican Theatre, York	Indoor	Saturday, 2 August 2025	(Ukraine) Oleg Pylypiak	(Czech Republic) Matyas Funiok	(England) Ryan Bennett
2025	(England) The Strongman Open; Utilita Arena, Birmingham	Indoor	Saturday, 6 September 2025	(Iceland) Hafþór Júlíus Björnsson (10)	(United States) Bryce Johnson	(New Zealand) Mathew Ragg
2025	(Scotland) Giants Live Finals; OVO Hydro, Glasgow	Indoor	Saturday, 18 October 2025	(England) Luke Richardson (5)	(Czech Republic) Ondre Fojtů	(England) Andrew Flynn
2026
2026	(England) Britain's Strongest Man; FlyDSA Arena, Sheffield	Indoor	Saturday, 7 February 2026	(Scotland) Tom Stoltman (5)	(England) Adam Bishop	(England) Paddy Haynes
2026	(England) Europe's Strongest Man; First Direct Arena, Leeds	Indoor	Saturday, 11 April 2026	(Czech Republic) Ondre Fojtů	(Ukraine) Pavlo Kordiyaka	(England) Adam Bishop
2026	(England) The Strongman Classic; Royal Albert Hall, London	Indoor	Saturday, 4 July 2026	(Czech Republic) Ondre Fojtů (2)	(England) Paddy Haynes	(South Africa) Rayno Nel
2026	(England) Britain's Strongest Woman; York Barbican, York	Indoor	Saturday, 25 July 2026	(England) Lucy Underdown (3)	(Wales) Rebecca Roberts	(England) Grace Hillbourne
2026	England's Strongest Man; York Barbican, York	Indoor	Sunday, 26 July 2026	(England) Andrew Flynn	(England) Joe Oliver	(England) Ben Glasscock
2026	(England) The Strongman Open; Utilita Arena, Birmingham	Indoor	Saturday, 5 September 2026	(Iceland) Hafþór Júlíus Björnsson (11)	(Ghana) Evans Nana	(Czech Republic) Matyáš Funiok
2026	(Scotland) Giants Live Finals; OVO Hydro, Glasgow	Indoor	Saturday, 17 October 2026	(Czech Republic) Ondre Fojtů (3)	(Czech Republic) Matyáš Funiok	(England) Andrew Flynn
2027
2027	(England) Britain's Strongest Man; Utilita Arena, Sheffield	Indoor	Saturday, 6 February 2027			
2027	(England) Europe's Strongest Man; First Direct Arena, Leeds	Indoor	Saturday, 3 April 2027			
2027	(England) The Strongman Classic; Royal Albert Hall, London	Indoor	Saturday, 10 July 2027			
2027	(Scotland) The Strongman Open; OVO Hydro, Glasgow	Indoor	Saturday, 16 October 2027			
2027	(England) Giants Live Finals; OVO Arena Wembley, London	Indoor	Saturday, 12 December 2027			

== Most wins ==
Rank	Champion	Country	Wins	Win breakdown	Podiums
1	Hafþór Júlíus Björnsson	Iceland	11	11 internationals	12
2	Evan Singleton	United States	6	6 internationals	9
3	Žydrūnas Savickas	Lithuania	6	6 internationals	7
4	Mitchell Hooper	Canada	5	5 internationals	9
5	Luke Richardson	England	5	4 internationals and 1 national	7
6	Tom Stoltman	Scotland	5	1 international and 4 nationals	10
7	Eddie Hall	England	5	5 nationals	8
8	Laurence Shahlaei	England	4	3 internationals and 1 national	10
9	Luke Stoltman	Scotland	4	3 internationals and 1 national	7
10	Juha-Matti Järvi	Finland	4	4 nationals	5
11	Oleksii Novikov	Ukraine	3	3 internationals	10
12	Johannes Årsjö	Sweden	3	3 internationals	9
13	Mateusz Kieliszkowski	Poland	3	3 internationals	6
14	Brian Shaw	United States	3	3 internationals	5
15	Ondre Fojtů	Czech Republic	3	3 internationals	4
16	Derek Poundstone	United States	3	3 internationals	3
