= Mitchell Hooper =

Canadian strongman (born 1995)

Personal information
- Nickname: The Moose
- Born: 29 September 1995 (age 31) Midhurst, Ontario, Canada
- Height: 190 cm (6 ft 3 in)
- Weight: 320–340 lb (145–154 kg)
- Spouse: Ashley Hooper

YouTube information
- Channel: Mitchell Hooper
- Years active: 2022–present
- Genre: Strength Training/Strongman
- Subscribers: 460 thousand
- Views: 237.26 million
- Last updated: 13 July 2026

Sport
- Sport: Strongman
Medal record
Representing Canada
World's Strongest Man
8th	2022 World's Strongest Man
1st	2023 World's Strongest Man
2nd	2024 World's Strongest Man
3rd	2025 World's Strongest Man
1st	2026 World's Strongest Man
Arnold Strongman Classic
1st	2023 Arnold Strongman Classic
1st	2024 Arnold Strongman Classic
1st	2025 Arnold Strongman Classic
1st	2026 Arnold Strongman Classic
Rogue Invitational
3rd	2022 Rogue Invitational
1st	2023 Rogue Invitational
1st	2024 Rogue Invitational
1st	2025 Rogue Invitational
6th	2026 Rogue Invitational
Shaw Classic
3rd	2022 Shaw Classic
2nd	2023 Strongest Man on Earth
1st	2024 Strongest Man on Earth
Giants Live
2nd	2022 Strongman Classic
2nd	2022 World Open
1st	2022 World Tour Finals
3rd	2023 Strongman Classic
3rd	2023 World Tour Finals
1st	2024 Strongman Classic
1st	2024 World Open
1st	2024 US Strongman Championship
1st	2024 World Tour Finals
7th	2025 Strongman Classic
12th	2026 Strongman Classic
Arnold Pro Strongman World Series
1st	2022 UK
1st	2024 UK
Australia's Strongest International
1st	2023 ASI

Mitchell Hooper (born 29 September 1995) is a Canadian strongman and kinesiologist.

He is a two time World's Strongest Man champion winning the 2023 and 2026 competitions both held in Myrtle Beach, South Carolina, where he also became the first Canadian to win the title. He has also won the Arnold Strongman Classic events four consecutive times from 2023 to 2026. In 2023, he became the fourth person to win both the World's Strongest Man and Arnold Strongman Classic competitions in the same year. He repeated this feat in 2026. Hooper is the only athlete to have won the World's Strongest Man, Arnold Strongman Classic, Rogue Invitational, and Strongest Man on Earth competitions.

== Early life and career ==
Hooper has a degree in human kinetics from the University of Guelph and a masters in clinical exercise physiology from the University of Sydney. He worked as a coach for the KW Titans and now runs his own kinesiology clinic in Barrie.

Prior to his strongman career, Hooper competed in sports including marathon running, bodybuilding, and powerlifting. He initially planned to train for strongman simply as a way to understand his clients who intended to pursue strength training; he considered quitting the sport before receiving a reserve invite to the 2022 World's Strongest Man.

=== Strongman ===
Hooper rose to prominence in the 2022 World's Strongest Man contest, where he won his qualifying group, beating veteran strongman Brian Shaw. He finished in 8th place in his first WSM Final, in what was also his first ever full international strongman contest. Following this success, he was coached by former competitor Laurence Shahlaei and placed third in both the 2022 Shaw Classic and Rogue Invitational. He also won two shows in 2022: the Giants Live World Tour Finals and the Arnold UK.

In 2023, Hooper won the Arnold Strongman Classic and the World's Strongest Man competition, defeating former champions Brian Shaw, Oleksii Novikov and reigning 2-time World's Strongest Man Tom Stoltman. He is the fourth person to win these two premier events in the same year, following Brian Shaw, Žydrūnas Savickas and Hafþór Júlíus Björnsson. Hooper continued his podium streak throughout the summer of 2023 and finished 2nd to Brian Shaw at the Strongest Man on Earth competition. He followed that up with a 3rd place in the Giants Live World Tour Finals and a week later he won the Rogue Invitational.

In 2024, Hooper won the Arnold Strongman Classic for back to back titles. He scored 52 points from a possible 55 and won 3 events. 2 weeks later, he won the Arnold UK in Birmingham. At the World's Strongest Man in May, Hooper finished 2nd to Tom Stoltman tearing the caluses of both his hands in the first event of the final. In July, Hooper won the Giants Live Strongman Classic. At the show he broke the axle press world record with a 218 kg (481 lb) lift. He also broke the wrecking ball hold world record. He then won the Strongest Man on Earth in August, which was considered the heaviest competition of the year. Hooper then won 3 Giants Live shows in a row, the World Open in Birmingham, the US Strongman Championship in Las Vegas and the World Tour Finals in Glasgow, becoming the only strongman to win all international Giants Live shows in the same year. Hooper finished the year winning the Rogue Invitational ahead of Hafþór Björnsson and Tom Stoltman. With wins in 8 out of 9 international contests as well as world records in the axle clean and press, keg toss, and replica Dinnie stone carry, Hooper suggested that his 2024 season was among the greatest in strongman history.

In 2025, Hooper won the Arnold Strongman Classic for the third time in a row. In May, Hooper came 3rd at the World's Strongest Man continuing his podium streak. After finishing 7th at the Giants Live Strongman Classic, Hooper decided to take a break to heal from injuries. He returned in October to win the Rogue Invitational for the third time in a row.

In 2026, Hooper won the Arnold Strongman Classic for the fourth time in a row making him the second most successful athlete at this competition. In April, Hooper won the World's Strongest Man for the second time. In May, he competed at the Enhanced Games in a deadlift duel against the all-time world record holder Hafþór Júlíus Björnsson, taking second place with a lift of 440 kg (970 lb).

== Personal life ==
Hooper is married to Ashley Hooper and together they have two daughters. In May 2025, Hooper was publicly accused by Ashley of infidelity with her best friend and bridesmaid during both of her pregnancies in 2023/24 and 2025, leading to a brief separation. The revelation sparked widespread backlash, particularly because just six months earlier, Hooper had openly criticized fellow strongman Luke Stoltman for engaging in extramarital affairs. The couple have since reconciled and remain together.

=== Other pursuits ===
Hooper has been outspoken regarding mental health throughout his career, discussing his own challenges with depression. He has publicly discussed his time in therapy and encouraged fans to seek help for mental health.

== Personal records ==
Strongman:

- Deadlift (with deadlift suit and figure 8 straps) – 475 kg (1,047 lb) (2021 Excalibur Max Deadlift Competition)
- Deadlift (raw with straps) – 442.25 kg (975 lb) (2024 Rogue Invitational)
- Elephant bar Deadlift (raw with straps) – 449.5 kg (991 lb) (2025 Arnold Strongman Classic)
- Axle Bar Deadlift with wheels (for reps) (with deadlift suit and straps) – 360 kg (794 lb) x 8 reps (2024 Giants Live Strongman Classic) (Joint-World Record)
- Axle press (using split jerk technique) – 218 kg (481 lb) (2024 Giants Live Strongman Classic) (World Record)
- Apollon Wheels (for reps) – 181.4 kg (400 lb) x 5 reps (2024 Arnold Strongman Classic)
- Log press – 210 kg (463 lb) (2024 Strongman Open/ World Log Lift Challenge)
- Super Yoke – 500 kg (1,102 lb) for 10 m (33 ft) in 5.70 secs (2022 Arnold UK) (World Record)
- Timber carry (raw grip) – 400 kg (882 lb) for 10.7 m (35 ft) in 7.10 secs (2024 Arnold Strongman Classic)
- Manhood Stone (Max Atlas Stone) – 250 kg (551 lb) over 4 ft (48 in) bar
- Atlas Stones (heavy set) – 120–200 kg (265–441 lb) in 25.74 secs (2022 Arnold UK)
- Inver Stones (hitching post setup) – 125–191 kg (276–421 lb) in 27.37 secs (2022 Rogue Invitational)
- Húsafell Stone replica sandbag – 181.5 kg (400 lb) for 68.58 m (225.0 ft) (2022 Rogue Invitational)
- Dinnie Stones (with Rogue replicas) – 333 kg (734 lb) for 12.60 m (41.3 ft) (2024 Arnold Strongman Classic) (World Record)
- Keg toss – 15 kg (33 lb) over 7.76 m (25 ft 5 1/2 in) (2024 World's Strongest Man) (former joint-world record)
- Weight over bar – 25.5 kg (56 lb) over 4.88 metres (16 ft 0 in) (2022 Rogue Invitational, record breakers)
- Wrecking ball hold – 267 kg (589 lb) for 118.72 seconds (2024 Giants Live Strongman Classic) (former world record)
- Medley – 453.5 kg (1,000 lb) yoke for 15m course into 163 kg (359 lb) log x 3 reps in 32.69 seconds (2022 Rogue Invitational) (World Record)

Training:

- Deadlift (with deadlift suit and figure 8 straps) – 456 kg (1,005 lb)
- Deadlift (raw with straps) – 432 kg (952 lb)
- Squat (raw with wraps) – 392.5 kg (865 lb) and 375 kg (827 lb) x 2 reps
- Bench press (raw with elbow sleeves) – 227 kg (500 lb) x 2 reps
- Log press – 213 kg (470 lb)

== Competitive record ==
Winning percentage: 58.06%
Podium percentage: 87.10%

	1st	2nd	3rd	Podium	4th	5th	6th	7th	8th	9th	10th	11th	12th	Total
International competitions	18	4	5	27	0	0	1	1	1	0	0	0	1	31

== Filmography ==
=== Television ===
Year	Title	Role	Notes
2022–2026	World's Strongest Man	Himself – Competitor	2x Champion
2026	Battle of the Beasts	Himself – Competitor	Winner
