= Magnús Ver Magnússon Strongman Classic =

Annual strongman competition in Iceland

Tournament information
- Location: Iceland
- Established: 2021; 5 years ago
- Number of tournaments: 5
- Format: Multi-event competition

Current champion
- (Poland) Mateusz Kieliszkowski

Magnús Ver Magnússon Strongman Classic is a strongman competition run and hosted by four-times World's Strongest Man champion Magnús Ver Magnússon.

Since its inception in 2021, the competition has been held every November, outdoors with the athletes being succumbed to cold Icelandic weather.

The competition in known for the athletes to lift both vintage, traditional implements including natural stones as well as more contemporary events. Some of the frequently recurring events include Húsafell Stone carry around the original pen, natural stone press, natural stone to shoulder and natural stone loading.

== Championship breakdown ==
Year	Winner	Runner-up	Third Place
2021	(Canada) Maxime Boudreault	(Iceland) Eyþór Ingólfsson Melsteð	(Finland) Sami Ahola
2022	(Australia) Rongo Keene	(Canada) Maxime Boudreault	(Iceland) Eyþór Ingólfsson Melsteð
2023	(Canada) Tristain Hoath	(Australia) Rongo Keene	(England) Shane Flowers
2024	(Poland) Mateusz Kieliszkowski	(Canada) Tristain Hoath	(United States) Andrew Burton
2025	(United States) Levi Strong	(Australia) Jordan Osborne	(United States) Lucas Hatton
2026	(Poland) Mateusz Kieliszkowski (2)	(New Zealand) Tiana Fa'apoi	(Scotland) Luke Stoltman

== Event results ==
=== 2021 ===
#	Name	Nationality	Points
1	Maxime Boudreault	(Canada)	72
2	Eyþór Ingólfsson Melsteð	(Iceland)	69.5
3	Sami Ahola	(Finland)	60.5
4	Kristján Jón Haraldsson	(Iceland)	58.5
5	Ryan England	(England)	56
6	Ervin Toots	(Estonia)	51.5
7	Sigfus Fossdal	(Iceland)	45
8	Pierre Motal	(France)	41.5
9	Dennis Kohlruss	(Germany)	34
10	Kim Ujarak Lorentzen	(Greenland)	33
11	Theodór Már Guðmundsson	(Iceland)	24
12	Stan Carradine	(United States)	20
13	Lautaruo Jauregui Lorda	(Argentina)	13.5
14	Tómas Darri Þorsteinsson	(Iceland)	11

=== 2022 ===
#	Name	Nationality	Points
1	Rongo Keene	(Australia)	87.5
2	Maxime Boudreault	(Canada)	81.5
3	Eyþór Ingólfsson Melsteð	(Iceland)	79
4	Vilius Jokužys	(Iceland)	72.5
5	Colton Sloan	(Canada)	68.5
6	Stefán Karel Torfason	(Iceland)	65.5
7	Ervin Toots	(Estonia)	65.5
8	Mika Törrö	(Finland)	56.5
9	Jacob Finerty	(United States)	54.5
10	James Jeffers	(Canada)	51.5
11	Kristján Jón Haraldsson	(Iceland)	50
12	Kim Ujarak Lorentzen	(Greenland)	46.5
13	Pierre Motal	(France)	33.5
14	Ryan England	(England)	26.5

=== 2023 ===
#	Name	Nationality	Points
1	Tristain Hoath	(Canada)	85
2	Rongo Keene	(Australia)	80
3	Shane Flowers	(England)	79
4	Vilius Jokužys	(Iceland)	68
5	Pavlo Kordiyaka	(Ukraine)	67
6	Pa O'Dwyer	(Republic of Ireland)	60
7	Sigfus Fossdal	(Iceland)	53
8	Mika Törrö	(Finland)	53
9	Sean Gillen	(Australia)	51
10	Kristján Sindri Níelsson	(Iceland)	40
11	Theodór Már Guðmundsson	(Iceland)	35
12	Matthew Riddall	(Spain)	20

=== 2024 ===
#	Name	Nationality	Points
1	Mateusz Kieliszkowski	(Poland)	111.5
2	Tristain Hoath	(Canada)	107
3	Andrew Burton	(United States)	96.5
4	Wesley Derwinsky	(Canada)	96
5	Tiano Faapoi	(New Zealand)	84
6	Audrius Jokubaitis	(Lithuania)	82.5
7	Shane Flowers	(England)	77
8	Evans Aryee	(Ghana)	63
9	Aivars Šmaukstelis	(Latvia)	57.5
10	Nikoloz Lekaidze	(Georgia (country))	56
11	Rongo Keene	(Australia)	55
12	Didzis Zariņš	(Latvia)	54
13	Kristján Sindri Níelsson	(Iceland)	46.5
14	Tyler Sigurdson	(Canada)	43
15	Pálmi Guðfinnsson	(Iceland)	32.5

=== 2025 ===
#	Name	Nationality	Points
1	Levi Strong	(United States)	68
2	Jordan Osborne	(Australia)	67
3	Lucas Hatton	(United States)	60
4	Nick Wortham	(United States)	59
5	Vilius Jokužys	(Iceland)	57
6	Maxime Boudreault	(Canada)	54
7	Justin Legere	(United States)	50
8	Dawid Pakulski	(Poland)	48
9	Pálmi Guðfinnsson	(Iceland)	46
10	Kristján Sindri Níelsson	(Iceland)	45
11	Chris Beetham	(Scotland)	36
12	Kári Elíasson	(Iceland)	18

=== 2026 ===
#	Name	Nationality	Points
1	Mateusz Kieliszkowski	(Poland)	76.5
2	Tiano Fa'apoi	(New Zealand)	72
3	Luke Stoltman	(Scotland)	71
4	Andrew Langelaar	(Canada)	70.5
5	Audrius Jokubaitis	(Lithuania)	67.5
6	Andrew Flynn	(England)	60
7	Kristján Sindri Níelsson	(Iceland)	53.5
8	Kári Elíasson	(Iceland)	41.5
9	Thorlakur Gunnarsson	(Iceland)	26.5
10	Chris Beetham	(Scotland)	24.5
11	Pawel Piskorz	(Poland)	19
12	Ryan Bennett	(England)	7.5
