= Austin Andrade =

American strongman

Personal information
- Nationality: American
- Born: 20 January 1994 (age 32)
- Occupation: Strongman
- Height: 6 ft 2 in (1.88 m)
- Weight: 170–177 kg (375–390 lb)
Medal record
Strongman
World's Strongest Man
7th	2024 World's Strongest Man
Qualified	2025 World's Strongest Man
10th	2026 World's Strongest Man
Arnold Strongman Classic
4th	2025 Arnold Strongman Classic
2nd	2026 Arnold Strongman Classic
Shaw Classic
6th	2022 Shaw Classic Open (Men)
1st	2023 Shaw Classic Open (Men)
5th	2024 Strongest Man on Earth
4th	2025 Strongest Man on Earth
Rogue Invitational
7th	2025 Rogue Invitational
8th	2026 Rogue Invitational
Strongman Champions League
1st	2023 SCL World's Strongest Latino
Giants Live
9th	2023 World Open
4th	2024 USA Championships
9th	2025 World Open
8th	2026 World Open
America's Strongest Man
5th	2022 America's Strongest Man
Beerstone
2nd	2022 Beerstone

Austin Andrade (born 20 January 1994) is an American Strongman competitor from San Antonio, Texas.

== Early life ==
A student of Amphitheater High School, Andrade started his sporting career in 2015 as a Football player and Wrestler in Adams State University.

== Career ==
Andrade developed a passion towards heavy strength training and entered the 2022 Beerstone competition held in Mission, Texas where he emerged runner up to Bobby Thompson. He then entered America's Strongest Man in the same year where he secured fifth place.

Next year, he won 2023 Strongman Champions League World's Strongest Latino, and got selected to the World's Strongest Man competition in 2024 held in Myrtle Beach, South Carolina where he placed seventh. He also won 2023 Shaw Classic Open (Men) competition and earned himself an entry to 2024 Strongest Man on Earth competition held in Loveland, Colorado where he placed fifth.

In 2025, he deadlifted a personal best 470 kg (1,036 lb) at the World Deadlift Championships sharing second place with Adam Bishop, behind Hafþór Júlíus Björnsson's legendary 510 kg (1,124 lb) all-time world record, becoming one of only 11 men in strongman history to reach that number.

== Personal records ==
- Deadlift (Equipped with straps) – 470 kg (1,036 lb) (2025 World Deadlift Championships and Strongman Open)
- Deadlift (Raw with straps) – 436 kg (961 lb) (2024 Strongest Man on Earth)
- Elephant bar Deadlift (Raw with straps) – 442.5 kg (976 lb) (2026 Arnold Strongman Classic)
- Trap bar Deadlift (from 12 inches) – 475 kg (1,047 lb) (2025 Strongest Man on Earth)
- Log press – 202 kg (445 lb) (2025 Strongest Man on Earth)
- Axle press – 190 kg (419 lb) (2024 World's Strongest Man)
- Squat – 317.5 kg (700 lb) x16 reps (2026 World's Strongest Man)
- Manhood Stone (Max Atlas Stone) – 250 kg (551 lb) over 4 ft bar (2024 Strongest Man on Earth)
- Atlas stone to shoulder – 183.5 kg (405 lb) x 4 reps (2025 Arnold Strongman Classic) (World Record)
- Safe Yoke – 643 kg (1,418 lb) for 6 meters in 17.94 seconds (2025 Strongest Man on Earth)
- Keg toss (for height) – 15 kg (33 lb) over 6.71 metres (22 ft 0 in) (2024 Strongest Man on Earth)
- Keg toss (for weight) – 29.5 kg (65 lb) over 4.57 metres (15 ft 0 in) (2025 Strongest Man on Earth)

== Competitive record ==
Winning percentage: 12.50%
Podium percentage: 18.75%

	1st	2nd	3rd	Podium	4th	5th	6th	7th	8th	9th	10th	20th	Total
International competitions	2	1	0	3	2	0	1	1	3	2	1	1	16
