= Thomas Evans (strongman) =

American strongman

Personal information
- Nationality: American
- Born: 9 May 1994 (age 32)
- Occupation: Strongman
- Height: 6 ft 3 in (1.91 m)
- Weight: 163 kg (359 lb)
Medal record
Strongman
Representing United States
World's Strongest Man
Qualified	2023 World's Strongest Man
Qualified	2024 World's Strongest Man
Qualified	2025 World's Strongest Man
Arnold Strongman Classic
5th	2023 Arnold Strongman Classic
9th	2024 Arnold Strongman Classic
7th	2026 Arnold Strongman Classic
Shaw Classic
1st	2022 Shaw Classic Open
6th	2023 Strongest Man on Earth
10th	2024 Strongest Man on Earth
3rd	2025 Strongest Man on Earth
Rogue Invitational
7th	2023 Rogue Invitational
6th	2024 Rogue Invitational
5th	2025 Rogue Invitational
8th	2026 Rogue Invitational
Arnold Pro Strongman World Series
1st	2022 Arnold Amateur
America's Strongest Man
5th	2021 America's Strongest Man

Thomas 'Tom' Evans (born 9 May 1994) is an American Strongman from Franklin, North Carolina.

Evans worked as an athletics assistant strength and conditioning coach at the University of Delaware and was also an American football player before trying out for 2021 America's Strongest Man. The following year, within a span of 6 months, he won both the 2022 Arnold Amateur and the Shaw Classic Open which paved the way for him to attend other high level international competitions.

Evans has qualified for the World's Strongest Man competition on three occasions (2023, 2024, 2025) but has yet to reach the finals. He secured fifth place at the 2023 Arnold Strongman Classic, sixth at the 2023 Strongest Man on Earth and sixth at the 2024 Rogue Invitational. His best performance was at 2025 Strongest Man on Earth where he won third place behind Evan Singleton and Lucas Hatton.

== Personal records ==
During competitions:

- Deadlift (raw with straps) – 410.5 kg (905 lb) (2024 Rogue Invitational)
- Elephant bar Deadlift (raw with straps) – 413 kg (911 lb) (2026 Arnold Strongman Classic)
- Trap bar Deadlift (from 12 inches) – 479.5 kg (1,057 lb) (2025 Strongest Man on Earth)
- Log press – 206 kg (454 lb) (2025 Strongest Man on Earth)
- Log press for reps – 163 kg (359 lb) x 7 reps in 90 seconds (2023 Rogue Invitational)
- Standing keg drop chest press – 170–258.5 kg (375–570 lb) x 9 weights (2025 Strongest Man on Earth)
- Manhood Stone (Max Atlas Stone) – 227 kg (500 lb) over 4 ft bar (2025 Strongest Man on Earth)
- Steinstossen (Rogue replica) – 84 kg (185 lb) for 3.23 metres (10 ft 7 in) (2023 Arnold Strongman Classic)
- Keg toss (for height) – 15 kg (33 lb) over 7.32 metres (24 ft 0 in) (2024 Strongest Man on Earth)
- Keg toss (for weight) – 31.8 kg (70 lb) over 4.57 metres (15 ft 0 in) (2025 Strongest Man on Earth)

During training:

- Raw Bench press – 238 kg (525 lb)
