= 2024 Arnold Strongman Classic =

Arnold Strongman Classic event of 2024

Competition information
- Dates: 1–2 March 2024
- Venue: Greater Columbus Convention Center
- Location: Ohio, Columbus
- Country: United States
- Athletes participating: 11
- Nations participating: 6

Champion(s)
- (Canada) Mitchell Hooper

The 2024 Arnold Strongman Classic was the 22nd Arnold Strongman Classic competition which took place in Columbus, Ohio from 1–2 March 2024 at the Greater Columbus Convention Center.

This year's event was three-time champion Hafþór Björnsson's first competition since announcing his return to the sport after he retired in 2020. 2022 Champion Martins Licis also returned to the competition after not competing in last year's edition.

== Participants ==
- Mitchell Hooper (CAN)
- Tom Stoltman (UK)
- Mateusz Kieliszkowski (POL)
- Hafþór Björnsson (ISL)
- Bobby Thompson (USA)
- Martins Licis (USA)
- Maxime Boudreault (CAN)
- Oleksii Novikov (UKR)
- Thomas Evans (USA)
- Oskar Ziółkowski (POL)
- Evan Singleton (USA)

== Event results ==
=== Event 1: Elephant Bar Max Deadlift ===
- Time Limit: 60 seconds per lift
- Notes: 3 lifts per athlete, weights to be submitted before each round.

#	Athlete	Nation	Weight	Event Points	Overall Points
1	Hafþór Björnsson	Iceland	456 kilograms (1,006 lb)	11	11
2	Bobby Thompson	United States	436 kilograms (961 lb)	10	10
3	Mitchell Hooper	Canada	431 kilograms (951 lb)	9	9
4	Evan Singleton	United States	427 kilograms (941 lb)	8	8
5	Tom Stoltman	United Kingdom	415 kilograms (916 lb)	7	7
6	Oleksii Novikov	Ukraine	409 kilograms (901 lb)	6	6
7	Thomas Evans	United States	397 kilograms (876 lb)	5	5
8	Martins Licis	United States	391 kilograms (861 lb)	4	4
9	Mateusz Kieliszkowski	Poland	388 kilograms (856 lb)	3	3
10	Oskar Ziółkowski	Poland	370 kilograms (821 lb)	2	2
11	Maxime Boudreault (Note: Maxime Boudreault sustained an injury in this event and took no further part in the competition.)	Canada	N/A	0	0

=== Event 2: Timber carry ===
- Weight: 400 kilograms (880 lb) timber frame along a 11 metres (36 ft) inclined ramp for the fastest time or else greatest distance.
- Time Limit: 30 seconds
- Notes: Raw/ no straps allowed. Timber may be dropped and picked up.

#	Athlete	Nation	Time	Event Points	Overall Points
1	Mitchell Hooper	Canada	7.10	11	20
2	Hafþór Björnsson	Iceland	8.40	10	21
3	Mateusz Kieliszkowski	Poland	8.69	9	12
4	Martins Licis	United States	14.81	8	12
5	Evan Singleton	United States	8.89 metres (29.2 ft)	7	15
6	Tom Stoltman	United Kingdom	8.13 metres (26.7 ft)	6	13
7	Oleksii Novikov	Ukraine	7.49 metres (24.6 ft)	5	11
8	Oskar Ziółkowski	Poland	4.90 metres (16.1 ft)	4	6
9	Bobby Thompson	United States	4.01 metres (13.2 ft)	3	13
10	Thomas Evans	United States	3.99 metres (13.1 ft)	2	7

=== Event 3: Dinnie Stone Carry ===
- Weight: Replica Dinnie Stones one weighing 145 kilograms (320 lb) and the other 188 kilograms (414 lb)
- Time Limit: 1 minute 30 seconds
- Notes: One drop of the stones allowed

#	Athlete	Nation	Distance	Event Points	Overall Points
1	Mitchell Hooper	Canada	12.60 metres (41.3 ft)	11	31
2	Hafþór Björnsson	Iceland	10.72 metres (35.2 ft)	10	31
3	Evan Singleton	United States	10.62 metres (34.8 ft)	9	24
4	Mateusz Kieliszkowski	Poland	9.73 metres (31.9 ft)	8	20
5	Tom Stoltman	United Kingdom	9.40 metres (30.8 ft)	7	20
6	Oleksii Novikov	Ukraine	4.04 metres (13.3 ft)	6	17
7	Bobby Thompson	United States	3.53 metres (11.6 ft)	5	18
8	Martins Licis	United States	2.79 metres (9.2 ft)	4	16
9	Thomas Evans (Note: Thomas Evans sustained an injury in this event and took no further part in the competition.)	United States	2.31 metres (7.6 ft)	3	10
10	Oskar Ziółkowski	Poland	0.25 metres (0.82 ft)	2	8

=== Event 4: Apollon Wheels ===
- Weight: 182 kilograms (401 lb)
- Time Limit: 2 minutes for max repetitions

#	Athlete	Nation	Repetitions	Event Points	Overall Points
1	Mitchell Hooper	Canada	5	11	42
2	Mateusz Kieliszkowski	Poland	4	9.5	29.5
2	Tom Stoltman	United Kingdom	4	9.5	29.5
5	Hafþór Björnsson	Iceland	1	7	38
5	Bobby Thompson	United States	1	7	25
5	Martins Licis	United States	1	7	23
7	Evan Singleton (Note: Evan Singleton sustained an injury in this event and took no further part in the competition.)	United States	0	0	24
7	Oleksii Novikov	Ukraine	0	0	17
7	Oskar Ziółkowski	Poland	0	0	8

=== Event 5: Stone Medley ===
- Weight: 136 kilograms (300 lb) stone press, 166 kilograms (366 lb) stone over bar and 186 kilograms (410 lb) stone to shoulder for repetitions
- Time Limit: 2 minute 30 seconds

#	Athlete	Nation	Time	Event Points	Overall Points
1	Mateusz Kieliszkowski	Poland	5 in 2:38.36	11	40.5
2	Mitchell Hooper	Canada	2 in 19.15	10	52
3	Tom Stoltman	United Kingdom	2 in 25.53	9	38.5
4	Oleksii Novikov	Ukraine	1 in 17.65	8	25
5	Bobby Thompson	United States	1 in 1:41.12	7	32
6	Hafþór Björnsson	Iceland	0	0	38
6	Martins Licis	United States	0	0	23
6	Oskar Ziółkowski	Poland	0	0	8

== Final standings ==
#	Athlete	Nation	Points
1st place, gold medalist(s)	Mitchell Hooper	Canada	52
2nd place, silver medalist(s)	Mateusz Kieliszkowski	Poland	40.5
3rd place, bronze medalist(s)	Tom Stoltman	United Kingdom	38.5
4	Hafþór Björnsson	Iceland	38
5	Bobby Thompson	United States	32
6	Oleksii Novikov	Ukraine	25
7	Evan Singleton	United States	24
8	Martins Licis	United States	23
9	Thomas Evans	United States	10
10	Oskar Ziółkowski	Poland	8
11	Maxime Boudreault	Canada	0

== Notes ==
Preceded by 2023 Arnold Strongman Classic	Arnold Strongman Classic	Succeeded by 2025 Arnold Strongman Classic
