= 2025 Arnold Strongman Classic =

Arnold Strongman Classic event of 2025

Competition information
- Dates: 28 February – 1 March 2025
- Venue: Greater Columbus Convention Center
- Location: Ohio, Columbus
- Country: United States
- Athletes participating: 10
- Nations participating: 4

Champion(s)
- (Canada) Mitchell Hooper

The 2025 Arnold Strongman Classic was the 23rd Arnold Strongman Classic competition which took place in Columbus, Ohio from 28 February–1 March 2025 at the Greater Columbus Convention Center.

== Participants ==
- Mitchell Hooper (CAN)
- Tom Stoltman (UK)
- Hafþór Júlíus Björnsson (ISL)
- Bobby Thompson (USA)
- Maxime Boudreault (CAN)
- Evan Singleton (USA)
- Trey Mitchell (USA)
- Lucas Hatton (USA)
- Austin Andrade (USA)
- Nick Guardione (USA)

== Event results ==
=== Event 1: Elephant Bar Max Deadlift ===
- Time Limit: 60 seconds per lift
- Notes: 3 lifts per athlete, weights to be submitted before each round.

#	Athlete	Nation	Weight	Event Points	Overall Points
1	Hafþór Björnsson	Iceland	465 kilograms (1025 lbs)	10	10
2	Mitchell Hooper	Canada	450 kilograms (992 lbs)	9	9
3	Bobby Thompson	United States	447 kilograms (985 lbs)	8	8
4	Trey Mitchell	United States	445 kilograms (981 lbs)	7	7
5	Evan Singleton	United States	438 kilograms (966 lbs)	6	6
6	Austin Andrade	United States	436 kilograms (961 lbs)	5	5
7	Lucas Hatton	United States	420 kilograms (926 lbs)	4	4
8	Tom Stoltman	United Kingdom	391 kilograms (862 lbs)	3	3
9	Nick Guardione	United States	354 kilograms (780 lbs)	2	2
10	Maxime Boudreault	Canada	N/A	0	0

=== Event 2: Overhead medley ===
- Weight: 113 kilograms (249 lb) dumbbell worth 1 point, 125 kilograms (276 lb) stone press worth 1 point, 175 kilograms (386 lb) log worth 1 point per repetition, 195 kilograms (430 lb) worth 10 points per repetition.
- Time Limit: 2 minutes

#	Athlete	Nation	Points	Event Points	Overall Points
1	Lucas Hatton	United States	32 points in 1:45.02	10	14
2	Trey Mitchell	United States	32 points in 1:51.15	9	16
3	Mitchell Hooper	Canada	12 points in 1:07.94	8	17
4	Austin Andrade	United States	12 points in 1:20.64	7	12
5	Hafþór Björnsson	Iceland	4 points	6	16
6	Tom Stoltman	United Kingdom	3 points	5	8
7	Evan Singleton	United States	2 points	4	10
8	Bobby Thompson	United States	1 points in 12.01	3	11
9	Nick Guardione	United States	1 points in 28.34	2	4
10	Maxime Boudreault	Canada	1 points in 45.65	1	1

=== Event 3: Timber carry ===
- Weight: 400 kilograms (880 lb) timber frame along a 11 metres (36 ft) inclined ramp for the fastest time or else greatest distance.
- Time Limit: 30 seconds
- Notes: Raw/ no straps allowed. Timber may be dropped and picked up.

#	Athlete	Nation	Time	Event Points	Overall Points
1	Mitchell Hooper	Canada	10.77	10	27
2	Lucas Hatton	United States	12.37	9	23
3	Evan Singleton	United States	17.91	8	18
4	Austin Andrade	United States	18.94	7	19
5	Hafþór Björnsson	Iceland	22.88	6	22
6	Maxime Boudreault (Note: Maxime Boudreault sustained an injury in this event and took no further part in the competition.)	Canada	11.63 metres (38.2 ft)	5	6
7	Nick Guardione	United States	10.31 metres (33.8 ft)	4	8
8	Tom Stoltman	United Kingdom	3.81 metres (12.5 ft)	3	11
9	Bobby Thompson	United States	2.44 metres (8.0 ft)	2	13
10	Trey Mitchell	United States	0.03 metres (0.098 ft)	1	17

=== Event 4: The big jerk ===
Behind the neck olympic style jerk with the weight starting from blocks.

- Notes: 4 lifts per athlete

#	Athlete	Nation	Weight	Event Points	Overall Points
1	Lucas Hatton	United States	247 kilograms (546 lbs)	10	33
2	Mitchell Hooper	Canada	242 kilograms (535 lbs)	8.5	35.5
2	Trey Mitchell	United States	242 kilograms (535 lbs)	8.5	25.5
4	Hafþór Björnsson	Iceland	232 kilograms (511 lbs)	5.5	27.5
4	Austin Andrade	United States	232 kilograms (511 lbs)	5.5	24.5
4	Evan Singleton	United States	232 kilograms (511 lbs)	5.5	23.5
4	Tom Stoltman	United Kingdom	232 kilograms (511 lbs)	5.5	16.5
8	Bobby Thompson	United States	215 kilograms (474 lbs)	2.5	15.5
8	Nick Guardione	United States	215 kilograms (474 lbs)	2.5	10.5

=== Event 5: Timber trial ===
- Weight: Carry and load two logs one weighing 140 kilograms (308 lbs) the other weighing 156 kilograms (345 lbs) on to a 500 kilogram sled (1100 lbs) then drag it backwards down a course.
- Time Limit: 1 minute 30 seconds

#	Athlete	Nation	Time	Event Points	Overall Points
1	Hafþór Björnsson	Iceland	31.21	10	37.5
2	Mitchell Hooper	Canada	35.29	9	44.5
3	Tom Stoltman	United Kingdom	37.37	8	24.5
4	Lucas Hatton	United States	37.57	7	40
5	Evan Singleton	United States	40.31	6	29.5
6	Trey Mitchell	United States	43.10	5	30.5
7	Austin Andrade	United States	45.60	4	28.5
8	Nick Guardione	United States	51.42	3	13.5
9	Bobby Thompson	United States	56.19	2	17.5

=== Event 6: Stone to shoulder ===
- Weight: 184 kilograms (406 lb) atlas stone worth 10 points per repetition or a 159 kilograms (351 lb) atlas stone worth 1 points per repetition.
- Time Limit: 2 minutes

#	Athlete	Nation	Points	Event Points	Overall Points
1	Austin Andrade	United States	40	10	38.5
2	Lucas Hatton	United States	30	9	49
3	Mitchell Hooper	Canada	20	7	51.5
3	Tom Stoltman	United Kingdom	20	7	31.5
3	Trey Mitchell	United States	20	7	37.5
6	Hafþór Björnsson	Iceland	10	5	42.5
7	Evan Singleton	United States	2	3.5	33
7	Nick Guardione	United States	2	3.5	17
9	Bobby Thompson	United States	0	0	17.5

== Final standings ==
#	Athlete	Nation	Points
1st place, gold medalist(s)	Mitchell Hooper	Canada	51.5
2nd place, silver medalist(s)	Lucas Hatton	United States	49
3rd place, bronze medalist(s)	Hafþór Björnsson	Iceland	42.5
4	Austin Andrade	United States	38.5
5	Trey Mitchell	United States	37.5
6	Evan Singleton	United States	33
7	Tom Stoltman	United Kingdom	31.5
8	Bobby Thompson	United States	17.5
9	Nick Guardione	United States	17
10	Maxime Boudreault	Canada	6

Preceded by 2024 Arnold Strongman Classic	Arnold Strongman Classic	Succeeded by 2026 Arnold Strongman Classic
