= 2023 Arnold Strongman Classic =

Arnold Strongman Classic event of 2023

Competition information
- Dates: 3-4 March 2023
- Venue: Greater Columbus Convention Center
- Location: Ohio, Columbus
- Country: United States
- Athletes participating: 10
- Nations participating: 5

Champion(s)
- (Canada) Mitchell Hooper

The 2023 Arnold Strongman Classic was the 21st Arnold Strongman Classic competition which took place in Columbus, Ohio from 3-4 March 2023 at the Greater Columbus Convention Center

The top 2 finishers from the previous years competition Martins Licis and Oleksii Novikov did not take part in this years edition of the event and this was Mateus Kieliszkowski's first event in 17 months due to recovering from injuries. Mitchell Hooper won the event on his debut becoming only the fourth man to do so after Mark Henry, Zydrunas Savickas and Vytautas Lalas.

== Participants ==
- Mitchell Hooper (CAN)
- Tom Stoltman (UK)
- Mateusz Kieliszkowski (POL)
- Luke Stoltman (UK)
- Kevin Faires (USA)
- Bobby Thompson (USA)
- Trey Mitchell (USA)
- Rob Kearney (USA)
- Pavlo Nakonechnyy (UKR)
- Thomas Evans (USA)

== Event results ==
=== Event 1: Wheel of Pain ===
- Weight: 9,072 kilograms (20,000 lb) for max distance.
- Time Limit: 60 seconds.

| # | Athlete | Nation | Distance | Event Points | Overall Points |
|---|---|---|---|---|---|
| 1 | Mateusz Kieliszkowski | Poland | 30.68 metres (100.7 ft) | 10 | 10 |
| 2 | Trey Mitchell | United States | 29.57 metres (97.0 ft) | 9 | 9 |
| 3 | Mitchell Hooper | Canada | 28.65 metres (94.0 ft) | 8 | 8 |
| 4 | Pavlo Nakonechnyy | Ukraine | 28.02 metres (91.9 ft) | 7 | 7 |
| 5 | Tom Stoltman | United Kingdom | 27.94 metres (91.7 ft) | 6 | 6 |
| 6 | Luke Stoltman | United Kingdom | 25.07 metres (82.3 ft) | 5 | 5 |
| 7 | Thomas Evans | United States | 24.61 metres (80.7 ft) | 4 | 4 |
| 8 | Kevin Faires | United States | 23.44 metres (76.9 ft) | 3 | 3 |
| 9 | Rob Kearney | United States | 21.31 metres (69.9 ft) | 2 | 2 |
| 10 | Bobby Thompson | United States | 18.11 metres (59.4 ft) | 1 | 1 |

=== Event 2: Austrian Oak ===
- Weight: 195 kilograms (430 lb) Heavy log. 175 kilograms (386 lb) Light log. For max repetitions.
- Time Limit: 90 Seconds
- Notes: Repetitions on the heavy log gained more points than repetitions on the light log.

| # | Athlete | Nation | Repetitions | Event Points | Overall Points |
|---|---|---|---|---|---|
| 1 | Trey Mitchell | United States | 4 | 10 | 19 |
| 2 | Mitchell Hooper | Canada | 3 | 8.5 | 16.5 |
| 2 | Bobby Thompson | United States | 3 | 8.5 | 9.5 |
| 4 | Rob Kearney | United States | 2 | 7 | 9 |
| 5 | Mateusz Kieliszkowski | Poland | 1 | 4.5 | 14.5 |
| 5 | Pavlo Nakonechnyy | Ukraine | 1 | 4.5 | 11.5 |
| 5 | Tom Stoltman | United Kingdom | 1 | 4.5 | 10.5 |
| 5 | Thomas Evans | United States | 1 | 4.5 | 8.5 |
| 9 | Luke Stoltman | United Kingdom | 6 (light log) | 2 | 7 |
| 10 | Kevin Faires | United States | 1 (light log) | 1 | 4 |

=== Event 3: Elephant Bar Deadlift ===
- Time Limit: 60 seconds per lift
- Notes: 3 lifts per athlete, weights to be submitted before each round.

| # | Athlete | Nation | Weight | Event Points | Overall Points |
|---|---|---|---|---|---|
| 1 | Bobby Thompson | United States | 447 kilograms (985 lb) | 10 | 19.5 |
| 2 | Mitchell Hooper | Canada | 445 kilograms (981 lb) | 9 | 25.5 |
| 3 | Rob Kearney | United States | 436 kilograms (961 lb) | 8 | 17 |
| 4 | Trey Mitchell | United States | 427 kilograms (941 lb) | 7 | 26 |
| 5 | Kevin Faires | United States | 409 kilograms (902 lb) | 6 | 10 |
| 6 | Thomas Evans | United States | 388 kilograms (855 lb) | 5 | 13.5 |
| 7 | Luke Stoltman | United Kingdom | 386 kilograms (851 lb) | 4 | 11 |
| 8 | Mateusz Kieliszkowski | Poland | 368 kilograms (811 lb) | 3 | 17.5 |
| 9 | Tom Stoltman | United Kingdom | 363 kilograms (800 lb) | 2 | 12.5 |
| 10 | Pavlo Nakonechnyy | Ukraine | no lift | 0 | 11.5 |

=== Event 4: Steinstossen Stone Throw ===
- Weight: 84 kilograms (185 lb).
- Notes: 3 attempts per athlete, furthest distance taken.

| # | Athlete | Nation | Distance | Event Points | Overall Points |
|---|---|---|---|---|---|
| 1 | Mateusz Kieliszkowski | Poland | 3.47 metres (11.4 ft) | 10 | 27.5 |
| 2 | Thomas Evans | United States | 3.23 metres (10.6 ft) | 9 | 22.5 |
| 3 | Mitchell Hooper | Canada | 3.19 metres (10.5 ft) | 8 | 33.5 |
| 4 | Pavlo Nakonechnyy | Ukraine | 3.15 metres (10.3 ft) | 7 | 18.5 |
| 5 | Bobby Thompson | United States | 3.04 metres (10.0 ft) | 6 | 25.5 |
| 6 | Tom Stoltman | United Kingdom | 2.96 metres (9 ft 9 in) | 5 | 17.5 |
| 7 | Luke Stoltman | United Kingdom | 2.81 metres (9 ft 3 in) | 4 | 15 |
| 8 | Trey Mitchell (Note: After this event Trey Mitchell withdrew due to injury and took no further part in the competition.) | United States | 2.71 metres (8 ft 11 in) | 3 | 29 |
| 9 | Rob Kearney | United States | 2.46 metres (8 ft 1 in) | 2 | 19 |
| 10 | Kevin Faires | United States | 2.07 metres (6 ft 9 in) | 1 | 11 |

=== Event 5: Timber Carry ===
- Weight: 400 kilograms (880 lb) along a 11 metres (36 ft) inclined ramp for the fastest time to finish or else greatest distance.
- Time Limit: 30 seconds.
- Notes: Raw/ no straps allowed. Timber may be dropped and picked up.

| # | Athlete | Nation | Time | Event Points | Overall Points |
|---|---|---|---|---|---|
| 1 | Mateusz Kieliszkowski | Poland | 8.35 | 10 | 37.5 |
| 2 | Kevin Faires | United States | 13.31 | 9 | 20 |
| 3 | Mitchell Hooper | Canada | 14.61 | 8 | 41.5 |
| 4 | Tom Stoltman | United Kingdom | 5.97 metres (19.6 ft) | 7 | 24.5 |
| 5 | Pavlo Nakonechnyy | Ukraine | 5.33 metres (17.5 ft) | 6 | 24.5 |
| 6 | Luke Stoltman | United Kingdom | 4.98 metres (16.3 ft) | 5 | 20 |
| 7 | Bobby Thompson | United States | 4.55 metres (14.9 ft) | 4 | 29.5 |
| 8 | Thomas Evans | United States | 4.14 metres (13.6 ft) | 3 | 25.5 |
| 9 | Rob Kearney | United States | 1.56 metres (5 ft 1 in) | 2 | 21 |

== Final standings ==
| # | Athlete | Nation | Points |
|---|---|---|---|
| 1st place, gold medalist(s) | Mitchell Hooper | Canada | 41.5 |
| 2nd place, silver medalist(s) | Mateusz Kieliszkowski | Poland | 37.5 |
| 3rd place, bronze medalist(s) | Bobby Thompson | United States | 29.5 |
| 4 | Trey Mitchell | United States | 29 |
| 5 | Thomas Evans | United States | 25.5 |
| 6 | Tom Stoltman | United Kingdom | 24.5 |
| 6 | Pavlo Nakonechnyy | Ukraine | 24.5 |
| 8 | Rob Kearney | United States | 21 |
| 9 | Kevin Faires | United States | 20 |
| 9 | Luke Stoltman | United Kingdom | 20 |

| Preceded by 2022 Arnold Strongman Classic | Arnold Strongman Classic | Succeeded by 2024 Arnold Strongman Classic |
