= Maxime Boudreault =

Canadian strongman (born 1991)

Personal information
- Born: 21 September 1991 (age 35) Kapuskasing, Canada
- Occupation: Strongman
- Height: 6 ft 3.5 in (1.92 m)
- Weight: 140–150 kg (309–331 lb)
Medal record
Representing Canada
World's Strongest Man
| Qualified | 2020 World's Strongest Man |
| 3rd | 2021 World's Strongest Man |
| 5th | 2022 World's Strongest Man |
| Qualified | 2025 World's Strongest Man |
Arnold Strongman Classic
| 6th | 2022 Arnold Strongman Classic |
| 11th | 2024 Arnold Strongman Classic |
| 10th | 2025 Arnold Strongman Classic |
Rogue Invitational
| 7th | 2022 Rogue Invitational |
| 6th | 2023 Rogue Invitational |
Shaw Classic
| 8th | 2020 Shaw Classic |
| 8th | 2021 Shaw Classic |
| 5th | 2022 Shaw Classic |
| 8th | 2023 Strongest Man on Earth |
| 11th | 2024 Strongest Man on Earth |
| 14th | 2025 Strongest Man on Earth |
Arnold Pro Strongman World Series
| 5th | 2017 Forts de Warwick |
| 7th | 2018 Forts de Warwick |
| 11th | 2019 Europe |
| 2nd | 2019 Forts de Warwick |
| 3rd | 2020 USA |
| 5th | 2024 UK |
Magnús Ver Magnússon Strongman Classic
| 1st | 2021 MVM Strongman Classic |
| 2nd | 2022 MVM Strongman Classic |
| 6th | 2025 MVM Strongman Classic |
Giants Live
| 8th | 2015 Scandinavian Open |
| 8th | 2017 North American Open |
| 8th | 2019 North American Open |
| 7th | 2021 World Tour Finals |
| 4th | 2022 Strongman Classic |
| 2nd | 2024 World Open |
| 7th | 2025 World Tour Finals |
North America's Strongest Man
| 4th | 2023 North America's Strongest Man |
| 1st | 2024 North America's Strongest Man |
| 13th | 2025 North America's Strongest Man |
Canada's Strongest Man
| 2nd | 2015 CSM |
| 4th | 2017 CSM |
| 3rd | 2018 CSM |
| 4th | 2019 CSM |
| 4th | 2021 CSM |
| 1st | 2022 CSM |

Maxime Boudreault (born 21 September 1991) is a Canadian strongman competitor from Kapuskasing, Ontario.

He secured 3rd place in the 2021 World's Strongest Man competition, won the inaugural Magnús Ver Magnússon Strongman Classic competition in 2021, and won 2022 Canada's Strongest Man at the national circuit.

== Career ==
Boudreault's competitive career began in 2013. He competed in his first major contest, the Strongman Champions League North American Championships, coming in 9th. In 2015, he came in second in Canada's Strongest Man and received his first Giants Live invite to the 2015 Scandinavian Open. There, he placed eighth.

Boudreault had a major breakthrough in 2020, when he placed third at the Arnold Santa Monica against a field including several World's Strongest Man winners and other top-level international competitors. In 2021, he placed third at World's Strongest Man and later won the inaugural Magnús Ver Magnússon Strongman Classic.

Boudreault has continued to receive invites to top-level international shows since his 2021 campaign but has often struggled due to injury. He was forced to withdraw from the 2023 Arnold Strongman Classic and World's Strongest Man due to a broken shin. In the 2024 Arnold Strongman Classic, he was injured on the Elephant Bar deadlift and was forced to withdraw after one event.

Boudreault experienced a returned to form in late 2024, winning North America's Strongest Man and placing second at the Giants Live World Open in Birmingham, England.

His results dipped in 2025 though, with Boudreault placing last at both the Arnold Strongman Classic and North America's Strongest Man. He finished 3rd in his group at World's Strongest Man and placed 14th at the Strongest Man on Earth despite winning two events outright in that competition.

== Personal records ==
- Double T Squat (with suit) – 391 kg (862 lb) (2022 Arnold Strongman Classic)
- Squat (Raw with wraps) – 354 kg (780 lb)
- Deadlift – 351.5 kg (775 lb) x 2 reps (2020 Arnold Pro Strongman USA Qualifier)
- Log press – 206 kg (454 lb) (2024 North America's Strongest Man)
- Axle press – 167.5 kg (369 lb) (2019 Giants Live North American Open)
- Húsafell Stone carry (around the pen) – 186 kg (410 lb) for 80.00 metres (262 ft 6 in) (around 2.3 revolutions) (2022 Magnús Ver Magnússon Classic)
- Power Medley – 340 kg (750 lb) loading barrow carry for 20m course into 317.5 kg (700 lb) arm over arm vertical lift for 5m course in 60.55 seconds (2023 Strongest Man on Earth) (World Record)
- Weight over bar – 25.5 kg (56 lb) over 4.88 metres (16 ft 0 in) (2022 Rogue Invitational, record breakers)
- Keg toss (for weight) – 36.5 kg (80 lb) over 4.57 metres (15 ft 0 in) (2025 Strongest Man on Earth)

== Competitive record ==
Winning percentage: 5.00%
Podium percentage: 20.00%

| | 1st | 2nd | 3rd | Podium | 4th | 5th | 6th | 7th | 8th | 9th | 10th | 11th | 12th | 13th | 14th | 20th | Total |
|---|---|---|---|---|---|---|---|---|---|---|---|---|---|---|---|---|---|
| International competitions | 2 | 3 | 3 | 8 | 2 | 5 | 2 | 4 | 6 | 2 | 3 | 4 | 1 | 1 | 1 | 1 | 40 |

== Filmography ==
=== Television ===
| Year | Title | Role | Notes |
|---|---|---|---|
| 2020–2022, 2025 | World's Strongest Man | Himself – Competitor | |
