= Trey Mitchell (strongman) =

America's strongest man in 2018

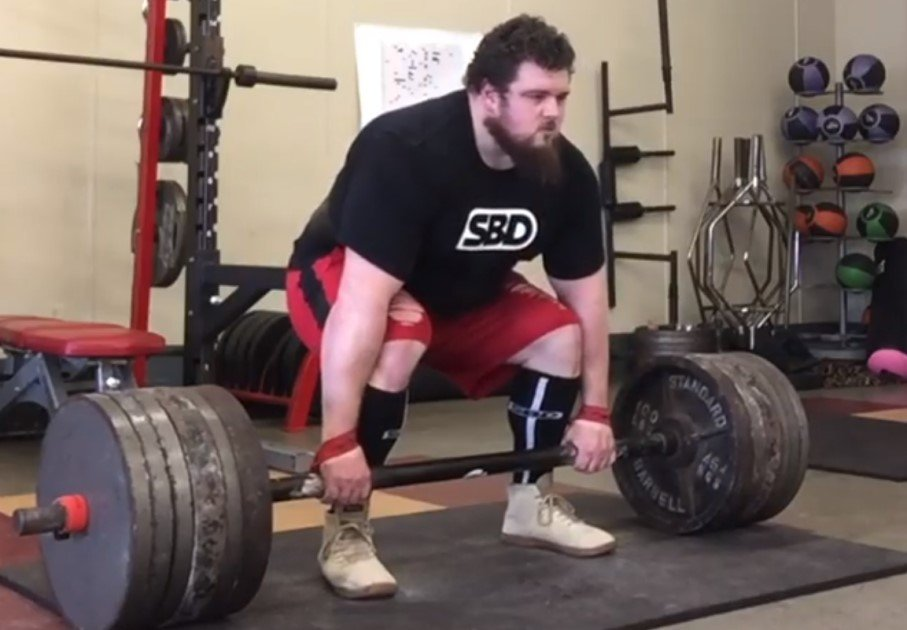

Personal information
- Nickname: "The Big Thicket"
- Born: July 16, 1993 (age 33) Lumberton, Texas
- Height: 6 ft 4 in (193 cm)
- Weight: 350–364 lb (159–165 kg)

Sport
- Sport: Strongman
Medal record
World's Strongest Man
8th	2019 World's Strongest Man
Qualified	2020 World's Strongest Man
4th	2021 World's Strongest Man
6th	2022 World's Strongest Man
4th	2023 World's Strongest Man
Qualified	2024 World's Strongest Man
4th	2025 World's Strongest Man
3rd	2026 World's Strongest Man
Arnold Strongman Classic
7th	2022 Arnold Strongman Classic
4th	2023 Arnold Strongman Classic
5th	2025 Arnold Strongman Classic
4th	2026 Arnold Strongman Classic
Rogue Invitational
2nd	2022 Rogue Invitational
10th	2023 Rogue Invitational
2nd	2025 Rogue Invitational
1st	2026 Rogue Invitational
Shaw Classic
4th	2020 Shaw Classic
1st	2021 Shaw Classic
1st	2022 Shaw Classic
5th	2023 Strongest Man on Earth
4th	2024 Strongest Man on Earth
6th	2025 Strongest Man on Earth
Giants Live
2nd	2018 North American Open
9th	2019 North American Open
3rd	2021 Arnold UK
4th	2023 Strongman Classic
2nd	2024 US Strongman Championship
2nd	2024 World Tour Finals
5th	2025 Strongman Classic
5th	2026 Strongman Open
Arnold Pro Strongman World Series
5th	2018 Australia
6th	2019 Forts de Warwick
Official Strongman Games
1st	2017 Official Strongman Games
6th	2018 Official Strongman Games
Mammoth Strength Challenge
2nd	2021 MSC
North America's Strongest Man
1st	2023 NASM
2nd	2026 NASM
America's Strongest Man
1st	2018 America's Strongest Man
3rd	2022 America's Strongest Man

Charles "Trey" Mitchell III (born July 16, 1993), is a professional strongman from Lumberton, Texas. He is most notable for winning the Rogue Invitational in 2026 and the Shaw Classic strongman championship two consecutive times in 2021 and 2022.

== Early life ==
Mitchell was born on July 16, 1993, and started strength training for football at high school. He then entered his first strength contest in Houston in 2012 and gradually excelled in the sport, winning America's Strongest Man in Long Beach, California in 2018.

== Strongman career ==
Mitchell's first major strongman competition victories were in the second and third editions of the Shaw Classic (before it was rebranded as the Strongest Man on Earth) in 2021 and 2022, beating fields including several former World's Strongest Man winners and other top-level international competitors. In 2022, he placed 2nd at the 2022 Rogue Invitational.

He placed fourth in the 2023 events in both the Arnold Strongman Classic and World's Strongest Man. He also won the 2023 North America's Strongest Man competition. Mitchell was forced to withdraw from the 2023 Rogue Invitational due to a right Achilles tendon tear suffered on the "Iron Bull" event. Mitchell was able to return from the injury less than seven months later at the 2024 World's Strongest Man, where he came in 4th in his group.

At the 2024 Giants Live World Deadlift Championships, Mitchell completed a 470 kg (1,036 lb) deadlift. Although the competition allowed for the use of a suit, he competed raw with only straps and a belt. It broke the world record for the heaviest raw deadlift on a deadlift bar in strongman history held by Jerry Pritchett and also earned Mitchell the new American deadlift record irrespective of the use of a suit. On the same day, Mitchell came in 2nd overall at the 2024 Giants Live USA Strongman Championships. Later that year, Mitchell also came in 2nd overall at the 2024 Giants Live World Tour Finals held in Glasgow, Scotland.

In 2025, Mitchell was again able to place 2nd at the 2025 Rogue Invitational.

At the 2026 World's Strongest Man, Mitchell made his first podium, placing 3rd in the finals.

== Personal records ==
- Deadlift (Raw with straps) – 470 kg (1,036 lb) (2024 Giants Live USA Strongman Championships) (Standard bar Strongman Raw world record)
- Elephant bar Deadlift (Raw with straps) – 445 kg (981 lb) (2025 Arnold Strongman Classic)
- Trap bar Deadlift (from 12 inches) – 475 kg (1,047 lb) (2025 Strongest Man on Earth)
- Deadlift (for reps) – 400 kg (882 lb) x 3 reps (2026 World's Strongest Man)
- Axle bar Deadlift with globes (for reps) (raw with straps) – 350 kg (772 lb) x 10 reps (2025 Giants Live Strongman Classic) (World Record)
- Double T Squat – 388 kg (855 lb) (equipped) (2022 Arnold Strongman Classic)
- Giant Barbell Squat (for reps) – 340 kg (750 lb) × 6 reps (single-ply suit w/ wraps) (2019 World's Strongest Man)
- Log press – 220 kg (485 lb) (2025 Strongest Man on Earth)
- Log press (Austrian Oak) for reps – 195 kg (430 lb) x 5 reps (2026 Arnold Strongman Classic)
- Axle press – 167.5 kg (369 lb) (2019 Giants Live North American Open)
- Barbell push press (behind the neck) – 242.5 kg (535 lb) (2025 Arnold Strongman Classic) (World Record)
- Viking press (for reps) – 150 kg (330 lb) × 18 reps (facing away from the pivot/ neutral grip) (2023 Giants Live Strongman Classic) (World Record)
- Standing keg drop chest press – 170–258.5 kg (375–570 lb) x 9 weights (2025 Strongest Man on Earth)
- Manhood Stone (Max Atlas Stone) – 250 kg (550 lb) over 4 ft bar (2024 Strongest Man on Earth)
- Atlas Stone over bar (no tacky) – 208.5 kg (460 lb) x 5 times over 4 ft bar (2023 Rogue Record Breakers) (World Record)
- Atlas Stones (5 stone set) – 159–204 kg (351–450 lb) in 25.02 secs (2022 Shaw Classic) (World Record)
- Inver Stones (hitching post setup) – 5 Stones weighing 125–191 kg (276–421 lb) in 23.78 seconds (2022 Rogue Invitational)
- Keg toss (for height) – 15 kg (33 lb) over 6.71 metres (22 ft 0 in) (2024 Strongest Man on Earth)
- Keg toss (for weight) – 34 kg (75 lb) over 4.57 metres (15 ft 0 in) (2025 Strongest Man on Earth)
- Rogue hammer hold – 29.5 kg (65 lb) for 63.01 seconds (2023 Rogue Record Breakers) (World Record)

In training:

- Squat (Raw with wraps) – 304 kg (670 lb) x 5 reps
- Log press (from the rack) – 217.5 kg (480 lb) x 2 reps
- Manhood Stone (Max Atlas Stone) – 229.5 kg (506 lb) x 3 reps (over 4 ft bar)

→ He performed this feat for 3 sets.

== Competitive record ==
Winning percentage: 10.81%
Podium percentage: 35.14%

	1st	2nd	3rd	Podium	4th	5th	6th	7th	8th	9th	10th	17th	20th	Total
International competitions	5	7	2	14	8	4	5	1	2	0	2	1	1	38

== Filmography ==
=== Television ===
Year	Title	Role	Notes
2019–2026	World's Strongest Man	Himself – Competitor	
2026	Battle of the Beasts	Himself – Competitor	
