= 2023 Rogue Invitational =

Athletic competition

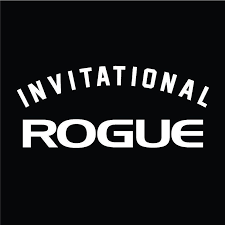
- Venue: Dell Diamond
- Location: Austin, Texas
- Dates: 26 - 29 October 2023

Champions
- CrossFit men: (Canada) Patrick Vellner; CrossFit women: (Hungary) Laura Horvath; Strongman: (Canada) Mitchell Hooper

The 2023 Rogue Invitational is the fifth annual competition in CrossFit organized by Rogue Fitness and the 3rd to feature a strongman competition. It was held at the Dell Diamond in Austin, Texas from 26 to 29 October 2023. The Rogue Invitational also featured a Rogue Record Breaker event and a Legends competition for CrossFit veterans. The winners are Patrick Vellner for the CrossFit men's competition, Laura Horvath for the women's, and Mitchell Hooper for the strongman.

The prize purse was at a minimum of $1,275,000, and reached over $1.6 million. With the winners of the crossfit competitions receiving $280,304.30 and the winner of the strongman competition receiving $146,159.14. 20 men and 20 women competed in the CrossFit individual divisions, 10 men were invited for the Strongman competition.

== Competitors ==
Athletes may qualify for the Rogue invitational through the online qualifier, the Q, and 6 men and 6 women were selected from the qualifier. All the other invitees were top athletes from the 2023 CrossFit Games, apart from Tia-Clair Toomey. The 2022 Rogue Invitational champion Justin Medeiros chose not to take part.

For the strongman competition, three of the most recent World's Strongest Man champions were invited, as well as additional three finalists from the 2023 World's Strongest Man. The defending champion Oleksii Novikov returned, but the 2021 champion Martins Licis chose not to take part.

=== CrossFit men's division ===
- (Canada) Jeffrey Adler
- (Canada) Patrick Vellner
- (Authorised Neutral Athletes) Roman Khrennikov ^{A}
- (Canada) Brent Fikowski
- (United States) Dallin Pepper
- (Finland) Jonne Koski
- (United States) Chandler Smith
- (Australia) Jay Crouch
- (Serbia) Lazar Đukić
- (Belgium) Jelle Hoste
- (Iceland) Björgvin Karl Gudmundsson
- (New Zealand) Bayley Martin
- (United States) Will Moorad
- (United States) Noah Ohlsen
- (Australia) Ricky Garard ^{(Q)}
- (France) Victor Hoffer ^{(Q)}
- (United States) Travis Mayer ^{(Q)}
- (United States) Tudor Magda ^{(Q)}
- (United States) Garrett Clark ^{(Q)}
- (United States) Jayson Hopper ^{(Q)}
- ^{^A}On March 1, 2022, CrossFit announced they will not recognise athletes from Russia or Belarus as a result of Russian violations of the Olympic truce through invasion of Ukraine during the binding truce. Athletes thereby will compete as neutral athletes. This rule continues to be in effect during the 2023 Rogue Invitational.

=== CrossFit women's division ===
- (Hungary) Laura Horvath
- (Canada) Emma Lawson
- (United States) Arielle Loewen
- (Poland) Gabriela Migała
- (Australia) Tia-Clair Toomey
- (United States) Alex Gazan
- (United States) Paige Semenza
- (United States) Bethany Flores
- (United States) Emma Cary
- (United States) Danielle Brandon
- (United States) Paige Powers
- (Canada) Emily Rolfe
- (Slovakia) Karin Freyova
- (United States) Dani Speegle ^{(Q)}
- (Belgium) Manon Angonese ^{(Q)}
- (Spain) Elena Carratala Sanahuja ^{(Q)}
- (United States) Lauren Fisher ^{(Q)}
- (United States) Kyra Milligan ^{(Q)}
- (United States) Christine Kolenbrander ^{(Q)}
- (United States) Shelby Neal

^{^(Q) Qualified through the Q qualifier.}

^{Annie Thorisdottir withdrew due to pregnancy, and Alexis Raptis due to injury.}

=== Strongman ===
- (Ukraine) Oleksii Novikov
- (Canada) Mitchell Hooper
- (United States) Trey Mitchell
- (Scotland) Luke Stoltman
- (Poland) Mateusz Kieliszkowski
- (United States) Thomas Evans
- (United States) Bobby Thompson
- (Scotland) Tom Stoltman
- (United States) Evan Singleton
- (Canada) Maxime Boudreault

== CrossFit ==
The CrossFit competitions were held over four days, from October 26 to 29, with 9 events scheduled. Bad weather conditions, however, led to a number of changes to some of the events for safety reason, for example, the front-rack lunges of Event 7 were changed to stationary lunges.

=== Event 1: Texas Heavy ===
- 1 mile Ruck (100 lb [45 kg] / 80 lb [36 kg])
- 800m Ruck (45 lb [20 kg] / 30 lb [14 kg])
- 1 Mile Run
- Sled Bag Pull to finish (125 lb [57 kg] / 100 lb [45 kg])

#	Men	Time	Pts Total	Women	Time	Pts Total
1	(Canada) Jeffrey Adler	19:08	100	(Australia) Tia-Clair Toomey-Orr	20:24	100
2	(Belgium) Jelle Hoste	19:15	95	(Poland) Gabriela Migała	20:36	95
3	(Authorised Neutral Athletes) Roman Khrennikov	19:31	90	(Canada) Emily Rolfe	21:13	90
4	(Canada) Brent Fikowski	19:36	85	(Hungary) Laura Horvath	21:22	85
5	(United States) Chandler Smith	19:41	80	(United States) Emma Lawson	21:30	80
6	(United States) Jayson Hopper	19:43	75	(United States) Bethany Flores	21:37	75
7	(Australia) Jay Crouch	19:44	70	(United States) Danielle Brandon	21:54	70
8	(Australia) Ricky Garard	19:47	65	(United States) Lauren Fisher	21:59	65
9	(United States) Travis Mayer	20:01	60	(Belgium) Manon Angonese	22:51	60
10	(Serbia) Lazar Đukić	20:07	55	(United States) Paige Semenza	23:23	55
11	(United States) Will Moorad	20:07	50	(Spain) Elena Carratala Sanahuja	23:28	50
12	(Iceland) Björgvin Karl Gudmundsson	20:16	45	(United States) Alex Gazan	23:34	45
13	(Canada) Patrick Vellner	20:49	40	(United States) Emma Cary	24:25	40
14	(United States) Noah Ohlsen	21:02	35	(Slovakia) Karin Freyova	24:54	35
15	(United States) Garrett Clark	21:59	30	(United States) Arielle Loewen	25:47	30
16	(United States) Dallin Pepper	22:20	25	(United States) Paige Powers	26:06	25
17	(United States) Tudor Magda	23:06	20	(United States) Christine Kolenbrander	26:57	20
18	(New Zealand) Bayley Martin	23:24	15	(United States) Dani Speegle	27:16	15
19	(Finland) Jonne Koski	23:35	10	(United States) Kyra Milligan	29:37	10
20	(France) Victor Hoffer	23:39	0	(United States) Shelby Neal	31:35	0

=== Event 2: Seat at the Bar ===
- 20-15-10 (men's)
- 15-10-5 (women's)
- Log Muscle Up
- 5 Back Squats (375 lb [170 kg] / 260 lb [120 kg]) after each

Time cap: 9 minutes

#	Men	Time	Pts Total	Women	Time	Pts Total
1	(Australia) Ricky Garard	6:20.31	165	(United States) Alex Gazan	5:19.75	145
2	(Canada) Patrick Vellner	6:47.90	135	(Hungary) Laura Horvath	5:33.80	180
3	(New Zealand) Bayley Martin	6:58.49	105	(United States) Christine Kolenbrander	5:50.11	110
4	(United States) Chandler Smith	6:59.51	165	(Canada) Emma Lawson	5:56.61	165
5	(France) Victor Hoffer	7:04.43	85	(Australia) Tia-Clair Toomey-Orr	6:17.74	180
6	(United States) Noah Ohlsen	7:07.15	110	(United States) Kyra Milligan	6:29.42	85
7	(Iceland) Björgvin Karl Gudmundsson	7:08.24	115	(United States) Emma Cary	7:06.98	110
8	(Canada) Jeffrey Adler	7:23.34	165	(Poland) Gabriela Migała	7:08.78	160
9	(United States) Travis Mayer	7:42.17	120	(United States) Paige Semenza	7:31.23	115
10	(Authorised Neutral Athletes) Roman Khrennikov	7:50.49	145	(United States) Shelby Neal	7:34.33	55
11	(Australia) Jay Crouch	7:59.03	120	(United States) Lauren Fisher	7:34.65	115
12	(United States) Will Moorad	8:38.67	95	(Belgium) Manon Angonese	8:05.72	105
13	(Serbia) Lazar Đukić	8:52.51	95	(Spain) Elena Carratala Sanahuja	8:38.32	40
14	(Belgium) Jelle Hoste	8:57.36	130	(United States) Dani Speegle	8:43.19	50
15	(Canada) Brent Fikowski	CAP+2	115	(United States) Paige Powers	CAP+1	55
16	(United States) Dallin Pepper	CAP+2	50	(United States) Arielle Loewen	CAP+3	55
17	(United States) Garrett Clark	CAP+20	50	(United States) Danielle Brandon	CAP+3	90
18	(United States) Tudor Magda	CAP+24	35	(Slovakia) Karin Freyova	CAP+12	50
19	(United States) Jayson Hopper	CAP+25	85	(Canada) Emily Rolfe	CAP+23	100
20	(Finland) Jonne Koski	WD	10	(United States) Bethany Flores	CAP+30	75

=== Event 3: The Circus ===
- SkiErg — (40/32 calories)
- Five Single-Arm Strongman Dumbbell Shoulder-to-Overhead (100 lb [45 kg] / 70 lb [32 kg])
- Killer Cage — down and back

Time cap: 15 min.

#	Men	Time	Pts Total	Women	Time	Pts Total
1	(Authorised Neutral Athletes) Roman Khrennikov	9:18.80	245	(Hungary) Laura Horvath	10:48.15	280
2	(Canada) Brent Fikowski	9:38.48	210	(Australia) Tia-Clair Toomey-Orr	11:22.71	275
3	(Canada) Patrick Vellner	9:55.95	225	(United States) Dani Speegle	11:33.55	140
4	(United States) Jayson Hopper	10:03.10	170	(United States) Emma Cary	11:51.01	195
5	(United States) Noah Ohlsen	10:14.20	190	(United States) Arielle Loewen	12:15.14	135
6	(Iceland) Björgvin Karl Gudmundsson	10:31.89	190	(Poland) Gabriela Migała	12:17.00	235
7	(Belgium) Jelle Hoste	10:35.57	200	(United States) Bethany Flores	12:43.49	145
8	(United States) Tudor Magda	10:44.98	100	(United States) Paige Powers	13:05.20	120
9	(Canada) Jeffrey Adler	10:51.12	225	(Canada) Emma Lawson	13:37.18	225
10	(United States) Dallin Pepper	10:51.17	105	(United States) Danielle Brandon	CAP+1	145
11	(United States) Chandler Smith	10:51.54	215	(Slovakia) Karin Freyova	CAP+1	100
12	(New Zealand) Bayley Martin	10:56.81	150	(United States) Lauren Fisher	CAP+1	160
13	(United States) Will Moorad	10:56.84	135	(United States) Paige Semenza	CAP+1	155
14	(United States) Travis Mayer	11:13.11	155	(United States) Christine Kolenbrander	CAP+1	145
15	(Australia) Jay Crouch	11:13.14	150	(United States) Kyra Milligan	CAP+1	115
16	(France) Victor Hoffer	11:20.25	105	(United States) Alex Gazan	CAP+2	170
17	(Serbia) Lazar Đukić	11:24.99	115	(Belgium) Manon Angonese	CAP+2	125
18	(Australia) Ricky Garard	11:38.92	180	(United States) Shelby Neal	CAP+2	70
19	(United States) Garrett Clark	CAP+48	60	(Spain) Elena Carratala Sanahuja	CAP+2	100
20	(Finland) Jonne Koski	WD	10	(Canada) Emily Rolfe	CAP+2	100

=== Event 4: 10th Inning ===
10 rounds for time:

- 4 Ring Muscle-ups
- 8 Handstand Push-ups
- 12 Power Snatch (95 lb [43 kg] / 65 lb [29 kg])

Time cap: 19 min.

#	Men	Time	Pts Total	Women	Time	Pts Total
1	(United States) Noah Ohlsen	16:10.60	290	(Australia) Tia-Clair Toomey-Orr	15:55.66	375
2	(Iceland) Björgvin Karl Gudmundsson	16:22.50	285	(United States) Emma Cary	16:37.36	290
3	(France) Victor Hoffer	16:36.35	195	(United States) Arielle Loewen	16:47.10	225
4	(Canada) Patrick Vellner	16:37.45	310	(Belgium) Manon Angonese	17:10.91	210
5	(Australia) Jay Crouch	16:49.47	230	(Canada) Emma Lawson	17:47.05	305
6	(Serbia) Lazar Đukić	17:10.65	190	(United States) Christine Kolenbrander	18:33.50	220
7	(United States) Will Moorad	17:38.37	205	(United States) Lauren Fisher	18:42.73	270
8	(Canada) Jeffrey Adler	17:42.41	290	(Canada) Emily Rolfe	18:43.35	165
9	(United States) Travis Mayer	17:52.82	215	(United States) Bethany Flores	18:51.03	205
10	(Canada) Brent Fikowski	17:57.53	265	(Spain) Elena Carratala Sanahuja	CAP+2	155
11	(United States) Chandler Smith	18:00.53	265	(Poland) Gabriela Migała	CAP+5	285
12	(Australia) Ricky Garard	18:12.00	225	(United States) Shelby Neal	CAP+7	115
13	(United States) Dallin Pepper	18:24.02	145	(United States) Danielle Brandon	CAP+8	185
14	(United States) Tudor Magda	CAP+0	135	(Hungary) Laura Horvath	CAP+13	315
15	(Authorised Neutral Athletes) Roman Khrennikov	CAP+23	275	(United States) Paige Powers	CAP+13	150
16	(United States) Garrett Clark	CAP+23	85	(United States) Paige Semenza	CAP+23	180
17	(United States) Jayson Hopper	CAP+24	190	(United States) Alex Gazan	CAP+33	190
18	(New Zealand) Bayley Martin	CAP+31	165	(United States) Kyra Milligan	CAP+33	130
19	(Belgium) Jelle Hoste	CAP+44	220	(Slovakia) Karin Freyova	CAP+40	110
20	(Finland) Jonne Koski	WD	10	(United States) Dani Speegle	CAP+45	140

=== Event 5: The Duel III ===
Bracket Style –

- Over Under Over Log
- 3 Sandbags to Teeter (200 lb [91 kg] / 150 lb [68 kg])

#	Men	Round (Time)	Pts Total	Women	Round (Time)	Pts Total
1	(United States) Jayson Hopper	5 (19.94)	290	(United States) Dani Speegle	5 (21.75)	240
2	(Canada) Brent Fikowski	5 (20.43)	360	(Hungary) Laura Horvath	5 (21.83)	410
3	(Canada) Patrick Vellner	4 (21)	400	(United States) Paige Semenza	4 (23.04)	270
4	(United States) Travis Mayer	4 (21.39)	300	(United States) Alex Gazan	4 (24.58)	275
5	(Belgium) Jelle Hoste	4 (21.44)	290	(United States) Danielle Brandon	4 (24.61)	265
6	(United States) Dallin Pepper	3 (22.02)	220	(United States) Arielle Loewen	3 (24.89)	300
7	(Australia) Ricky Garard	3 (22.10)	295	(United States) Christine Kolenbrander	3 (24.99)	290
8	(United States) Tudor Magda	3 (22.12)	200	(Belgium) Manon Angonese	3 (25.20)	275
9	(Iceland) Björgvin Karl Gudmundsson	3 (23.11)	345	(Canada) Emma Lawson	3 (26.87)	365
10	(New Zealand) Bayley Martin	3 (25.29)	220	(United States) Lauren Fisher	3 (27.01)	285
11	(Canada) Jeffrey Adler	2 (24.99)	340	(Poland) Gabriela Migała	2 (27.03)	335
12	(Australia) Jay Crouch	2 (25.21)	275	(Australia) Tia-Clair Toomey-Orr	2 (27.43)	420
13	(Authorised Neutral Athletes) Roman Khrennikov	2 (26.84)	315	(Canada) Emily Rolfe	2 (27.93)	205
14	(United States) Will Moorad	2 (28.20)	240	(United States) Paige Powers	2 (28.53)	185
15	(United States) Noah Ohlsen	2 (28.21)	320	(United States) Emma Cary	2 (29.78)	320
16	(United States) Garrett Clark	1 (26.43)	110	(United States) Shelby Neal	1 (30.55)	140
17	(France) Victor Hoffer	1 (26.61)	215	(United States) Kyra Milligan	1 (30.78)	150
18	(Serbia) Lazar Đukić	1 (26.62)	205	(United States) Bethany Flores	1 (32.38)	220
19	(United States) Chandler Smith	1 (26.74)	275	(Slovakia) Karin Freyova	1 (34.45)	120
20	(Finland) Jonne Koski	WD	10	(Spain) Elena Carratala Sanahuja	1 (1:15)	155

=== Event 6: Max Deadlift ===
- 1 RM Deadlift

Tie Break: Time determined prior to lifts of a run carrying jerrycans (100 lb [45 kg] in each hand).

#	Men	Weight	Pts Total	Women	Weight	Pts Total
1	(United States) Chandler Smith	610 lb (280 kg)	375	(United States) Alex Gazan	425 lb (193 kg)	375
2	(United States) Tudor Magda	595 lb (270 kg)	295	(United States) Dani Speegle	420 lb (190 kg)	335
3	(Canada) Patrick Vellner	595 lb (270 kg)	490	(Hungary) Laura Horvath	415 lb (188 kg)	500
4	(United States) Jayson Hopper	575 lb (261 kg)	375	(Australia) Tia-Clair Toomey-Orr	400 lb (180 kg)	505
5	(Australia) Jay Crouch	575 lb (261 kg)	355	(United States) Kyra Milligan	395 lb (179 kg)	230
6	(United States) Travis Mayer	575 lb (261 kg)	375	(Belgium) Manon Angonese	380 lb (170 kg)	350
7	(Authorised Neutral Athletes) Roman Khrennikov	565 lb (256 kg)	385	(United States) Christine Kolenbrander	380 lb (170 kg)	360
8	(United States) Garrett Clark	565 lb (256 kg)	175	(United States) Lauren Fisher	380 lb (170 kg)	350
9	(Canada) Jeffrey Adler	545 lb (247 kg)	400	(Poland) Gabriela Migała	375 lb (170 kg)	395
10	(Belgium) Jelle Hoste	545 lb (247 kg)	345	(United States) Paige Semenza	375 lb (170 kg)	325
11	(United States) Dallin Pepper	545 lb (247 kg)	270	(Canada) Emma Lawson	365 lb (166 kg)	415
12	(New Zealand) Bayley Martin	545 lb (247 kg)	265	(Slovakia) Karin Freyova	365 lb (166 kg)	165
13	(Australia) Ricky Garard	535 lb (243 kg)	335	(United States) Paige Powers	355 lb (161 kg)	225
14	(Serbia) Lazar Đukić	535 lb (243 kg)	240	(United States) Shelby Neal	355 lb (161 kg)	175
15	(United States) Noah Ohlsen	525 lb (238 kg)	350	(United States) Arielle Loewen	345 lb (156 kg)	330
16	(Canada) Brent Fikowski	515 lb (234 kg)	385	(United States) Danielle Brandon	335 lb (152 kg)	290
17	(United States) Will Moorad	515 lb (234 kg)	260	(United States) Emma Cary	335 lb (152 kg)	340
18	(Iceland) Björgvin Karl Gudmundsson	495 lb (225 kg)	360	(Canada) Emily Rolfe	315 lb (143 kg)	220
19	(France) Victor Hoffer	(No lift)	215	(Spain) Elena Carratala Sanahuja	315 lb (143 kg)	165
20	(Finland) Jonne Koski	WD	10	(United States) Bethany Flores	(No lift)	220

=== Event 7: Hulk Hands ===
- 30 Echo Bike Cals
- 20 Double FatBell Ground to Overhead (70 lb [32 kg] / 50 lb [23 kg])
- Reverse Stationary Lunges with FatBell (70 lb [32 kg] / 50 lb [23 kg])
- Run
- Bag Drag Up Hill
- Run
- Reverse Stationary Lunges with FatBell (70 lb [32 kg] / 50 lb [23 kg])
- 20 Double FatBell Ground to Overhead (70 lb [32 kg] / 50 lb [23 kg])
- 30 Echo Bike Cals

#	Men	Time	Pts Total	Women	Time	Pts Total
1	(United States) Dallin Pepper	9:04.75	370	(Hungary) Laura Horvath	10:44.47	600
2	(Authorised Neutral Athletes) Roman Khrennikov	9:08.72	480	(Poland) Gabriela Migała	10:54.27	490
3	(United States) Jayson Hopper	9:27.24	465	(United States) Alex Gazan	11:45.71	465
4	(Belgium) Jelle Hoste	9:34.58	430	(United States) Emma Cary	11:51.71	425
5	(Australia) Ricky Garard	9:37.23	415	(Australia) Tia-Clair Toomey-Orr	12:03.81	585
6	(Canada) Jeffrey Adler	9:50.31	475	(Canada) Emily Rolfe	12:16.27	295
7	(Serbia) Lazar Đukić	9:53.03	310	(Canada) Emma Lawson	12:29.85	485
8	(Canada) Brent Fikowski	9:54.98	450	(United States) Danielle Brandon	12:32.80	355
9	(Canada) Patrick Vellner	9:55.61	550	(Belgium) Manon Angonese	12:43.16	410
10	(United States) Travis Mayer	10:21.27	430	(United States) Arielle Loewen	13:23.97	385
11	(Iceland) Björgvin Karl Gudmundsson	10:31.03	410	(United States) Bethany Flores	13:24.31	270
12	(United States) Noah Ohlsen	10:31.44	395	(Slovakia) Karin Freyova	13:28.49	210
13	(United States) Chandler Smith	10:40.18	415	(United States) Dani Speegle	13:39.37	375
14	(Australia) Jay Crouch	10:40.99	390	(United States) Christine Kolenbrander	13:52.44	395
15	(New Zealand) Bayley Martin	11:07.46	295	(United States) Paige Powers	14:17.42	255
16	(France) Victor Hoffer	11:15.86	240	(United States) Shelby Neal	14:35.82	200
17	(United States) Will Moorad	11:20.05	280	(United States) Paige Semenza	14:58.03	345
18	(United States) Garrett Clark	11:40.81	190	(Spain) Elena Carratala Sanahuja	15:01.88	180
19	(United States) Tudor Magda	13:17.44	305	(United States) Lauren Fisher	15:04.11	360
20	(Finland) Jonne Koski	WD	10	(United States) Kyra Milligan	16:12.81	230

=== Event 8: Big Cat ===
5 Rounds for Time

- 6 Box Jumps (42 in [110 cm] / 36 in [91 cm])
- 50 ft Handstand Walk
- Run

Time cap: 9 min.

#	Men	Time	Pts Total	Women	Time	Pts Total
1	(France) Victor Hoffer	7:00	340	(United States) Danielle Brandon	6:52.39	455
2	(United States) Tudor Magda	7:17	400	(Australia) Tia-Clair Toomey-Orr	7:19.61	680
3	(Australia) Jay Crouch	7:20	480	(United States) Paige Powers	7:28.65	345
4	(United States) Dallin Pepper	7:28	455	(United States) Arielle Loewen	7:40.46	470
5	(Australia) Ricky Garard	7:34	495	(Hungary) Laura Horvath	7:41.78	680
6	(Canada) Brent Fikowski	7:35	525	(United States) Emma Cary	7:41.94	500
7	(Serbia) Lazar Đukić	7:44	380	(Canada) Emma Lawson	7:52.76	555
8	(Canada) Jeffrey Adler	7:46	540	(Poland) Gabriela Migała	8:08.58	555
9	(United States) Noah Ohlsen	7:47	455	(United States) Dani Speegle	8:32.87	435
10	(Canada) Patrick Vellner	7:48	605	(United States) Shelby Neal	8:34.51	255
11	(New Zealand) Bayley Martin	7:51	345	(United States) Bethany Flores	8:47.86	320
12	(United States) Travis Mayer	7:53	475	(United States) Alex Gazan	8:48.00	510
13	(United States) Jayson Hopper	8:08	505	(Slovakia) Karin Freyova	CAP+0	250
14	(Authorised Neutral Athletes) Roman Khrennikov	8:12	515	(Spain) Elena Carratala Sanahuja	CAP+0	215
15	(Belgium) Jelle Hoste	8:20	460	(United States) Christine Kolenbrander	CAP+1	425
16	(United States) Chandler Smith	8:22	440	(Belgium) Manon Angonese	CAP+1	435
17	(Iceland) Björgvin Karl Gudmundsson	8:29	430	(Canada) Emily Rolfe	CAP+1	315
18	(United States) Garrett Clark	8:46	205	(United States) Lauren Fisher	CAP+1	375
19	(United States) Will Moorad	8:58	290	(United States) Paige Semenza	CAP+4	355
20	(Finland) Jonne Koski	WD	10	(United States) Kyra Milligan	CAP+5	230

=== Event 9: The Cleanup ===
- 3 rounds: 25 Double unders / 5 Power Cleans (225 lb [102 kg] / 155 lb [70 kg])
- 2 rounds: 25 Double unders / 5 Squat Cleans (225 lb [102 kg] / 155 lb [70 kg])
- 1 round: 25 Double unders / 5 Clean and jerks (225 lb [102 kg] / 155 lb [70 kg])

#	Men	Time	Pts Total	Women	Time	Pts Total
1	(Canada) Jeffrey Adler	3:58	640	(Hungary) Laura Horvath	3:47	780
2	(Authorised Neutral Athletes) Roman Khrennikov	4:09	610	(Canada) Emma Lawson	4:11	650
3	(United States) Dallin Pepper	4:15	545	(Australia) Tia-Clair Toomey-Orr	4:17	770
4	(Canada) Brent Fikowski	4:17	610	(United States) Danielle Brandon	4:26	540
5	(United States) Travis Mayer	4:21	555	(United States) Alex Gazan	4:26	590
6	(United States) Noah Ohlsen	4:30	530	(Poland) Gabriela Migała	4:28	630
7	(Australia) Ricky Garard	4:33	565	(United States) Dani Speegle	4:31	505
8	(Serbia) Lazar Đukić	4:36	445	(United States) Kyra Milligan	4:32	295
9	(Australia) Jay Crouch	4:40	540	(United States) Paige Powers	4:33	405
10	(Canada) Patrick Vellner	4:41	660	(Slovakia) Karin Freyova	4:39	305
11	(United States) Garrett Clark	4:41	255	(United States) Emma Cary	4:42	550
12	(Iceland) Björgvin Karl Gudmundsson	4:45	475	(United States) Lauren Fisher	4:54	420
13	(United States) Jayson Hopper	4:47	545	(United States) Arielle Loewen	4:59	510
14	(United States) Tudor Magda	4:50	435	(United States) Paige Semenza	5:00	390
15	(New Zealand) Bayley Martin	4:58	375	(United States) Christine Kolenbrander	5:04	455
16	(Belgium) Jelle Hoste	5:28	485	(Belgium) Manon Angonese	5:09	460
17	(France) Victor Hoffer	5:35	360	(Spain) Elena Carratala Sanahuja	5:32	235
18	(United States) Chandler Smith	5:38	455	(Canada) Emily Rolfe	5:38	330
19	(United States) Will Moorad	5:47	300	(United States) Shelby Neal	5:57	265
20	(Finland) Jonne Koski	WD	10	(United States) Bethany Flores	6:30	320

=== Final standings ===
Men
#	Name	Pts
1	(Canada) Patrick Vellner	660
2	(Canada) Jeffrey Adler	640
3	(Authorised Neutral Athletes) Roman Khrennikov	610
4	(Canada) Brent Fikowski	610
5	(Australia) Ricky Garard	565
6	(United States) Travis Mayer	555
7	(United States) Jayson Hopper	545
8	(United States) Dallin Pepper	545
9	(Australia) Jay Crouch	540
10	(United States) Noah Ohlsen	530
11	(Belgium) Jelle Hoste	485
12	(Iceland) Björgvin Karl Gudmundsson	475
13	(United States) Chandler Smith	455
14	(Serbia) Lazar Đukić	445
15	(United States) Tudor Magda	435
16	(New Zealand) Bayley Martin	375
17	(France) Victor Hoffer	360
18	(United States) Will Moorad	300
19	(United States) Garrett Clark	255
20	(Finland) Jonne Koski (WD)	10

Women
#	Name	Pts
1	(Hungary) Laura Horvath	780
2	(Australia) Tia-Clair Toomey-Orr	770
3	(Canada) Emma Lawson	650
4	(Poland) Gabriela Migała	630
5	(United States) Alex Gazan	590
6	(United States) Emma Cary	550
7	(United States) Danielle Brandon	540
8	(United States) Arielle Loewen	510
9	(United States) Dani Speegle	505
10	(Belgium) Manon Angonese	460
11	(United States) Christine Kolenbrander	455
12	(United States) Lauren Fisher	420
13	(United States) Paige Powers	405
14	(United States) Paige Semenza	390
15	(Canada) Emily Rolfe	330
16	(United States) Bethany Flores	320
17	(Slovakia) Karin Freyova	305
18	(United States) Kyra Milligan	295
19	(United States) Shelby Neal	265
20	(Spain) Elena Carratala Sanahuja	235

== Strongman ==
Six events were planned to be contested over two days (October 27 and 28). However, due to bad weather conditions, the event Apollon's Wheels was canceled, and the Ultimate Log Medley event was delayed and changed to Log Lift for repetitions which was held indoors.

=== Event 1: Tower of Power ===
- Weight: 900 pounds (410 kg) deadlift for repetitions
- Time Limit: 60 seconds

#	Name	Repetitions	Event Pts	Overall Pts
1	(United States) Trey Mitchell	8	10	9.5
2	(United States) Bobby Thompson	8	10	9.5
3	(Canada) Mitchell Hooper	7	8	8
4	(Ukraine) Oleksii Novikov	6	7	7
5	(Scotland) Tom Stoltman	4	6	6
6	(United States) Thomas Evans	3	5	5
7	(United States) Evan Singleton	2	4	4
8	(Scotland) Luke Stoltman	1	3	3
9	(Canada) Maxime Boudreault	0	0	0
9	(Poland) Mateusz Kieliszkowski	0	0	0

=== Event 2: Iron Bull Sled Pull ===
- Weight: 1,000 pounds (450 kg)
- Course Length: 50 feet (15 m)
- Time Limit: 60 seconds

#	Name	Time	Event Pts	Overall Pts
1	(Poland) Mateusz Kieliszkowski	42.54 s	10	10
2	(Canada) Mitchell Hooper	36' 7" (11.15 m)	9	17
3	(United States) Evan Singleton	35' 10" (10.92 m)	8	12
4	(Scotland) Luke Stoltman	33' 10" (10.31 m)	7	10
5	(Canada) Maxime Boudreault	31' 3" (9.53 m)	6	6
6	(Scotland) Tom Stoltman	23' 2" (7.06 m)	5	11
7	(Ukraine) Oleksii Novikov	22' 1" (6.73 m)	4	11
8	(United States) Thomas Evans	21' (6.40 m)	3	8
9	(United States) Trey Mitchell (Note: After this event Trey Mitchell withdrew from the competition due to suffering a right achilles tendon tear.)	16' 7" (5.05 m)	2	11.5
10	(United States) Bobby Thompson	10' (4.29 m)	1	10.5

=== Event 3: Rogue-a-Coaster ===
- Weight: 600 pounds (270 kg)
- Time Limit: 1 minute 30 seconds
- Notes: 54 inch incline

#	Name	Time	Event Pts	Overall Pts
1	(Poland) Mateusz Kieliszkowski	27.95 s	10	20
2	(Scotland) Tom Stoltman	33.08 s	9	20
3	(United States) Evan Singleton	35.40 s	8	20
4	(Canada) Mitchell Hooper	38.18 s	7	24
5	(Ukraine) Oleksii Novikov	40.37 s	6	17
6	(Canada) Maxime Boudreault	42.39 s	5	11
7	(United States) Thomas Evans	44.98 s	4	12
8	(United States) Bobby Thompson	47.28 s	3	13.5
9	(Scotland) Luke Stoltman	49.86 feet (15.20 m)	2	12

=== Event 4: Log Lift ===
- Weight: 360 pounds (160 kg) log lift for repetitions
- Time Limit: 1 minute 30 seconds
- Notes: If athletes got the log to their lap and the time expired they were allowed to attempt to lift the log

#	Name	Repetitions	Event Pts	Overall Pts
1	(Scotland) Tom Stoltman	10	10	30
2	(Canada) Mitchell Hooper	9	9	33
3	(United States) Thomas Evans	8	7	19
3	(United States) Bobby Thompson	8	7	20.5
3	(Scotland) Luke Stoltman	8	7	19
6	(Poland) Mateusz Kieliszkowski	7	4.5	24.5
6	(Canada) Maxime Boudreault	7	4.5	15.5
8	(United States) Evan Singleton	5	2.5	22.5
8	(Ukraine) Oleksii Novikov	5	2.5	19.5

=== Event 5: The Duel ===
- Weight: 3 sandbags weighing 325 pounds (147 kg), 350 pounds (160 kg) and 375 pounds (170 kg) to be picked up and loaded in to a teeter
- Time Limit: 60 seconds

#	Name	Time	Event Pts	Overall Pts
1	(Scotland) Tom Stoltman	17.57 s	10	40
2	(Canada) Mitchell Hooper	17.84 s	9	42
3	(Canada) Maxime Boudreault	18.83 s	8	23.5
4	(Poland) Mateusz Kieliszkowski	19.63 s	7	31.5
5	(United States) Evan Singleton	20.55 s	6	28.5
6	(United States) Bobby Thompson	20.81 s	5	25.5
7	(United States) Thomas Evans	20.94 s	4	23
8	(Scotland) Luke Stoltman	22.35 s	3	22
9	(Ukraine) Oleksii Novikov	23.38 s	2	21.5

=== Final standings ===
#	Name	Pts
1st place, gold medalist(s)	(Canada) Mitchell Hooper	42
2nd place, silver medalist(s)	(Scotland) Tom Stoltman	40
3rd place, bronze medalist(s)	(Poland) Mateusz Kieliszkowski	31.5
4	(United States) Evan Singleton	28.5
5	(United States) Bobby Thompson	25.5
6	(Canada) Maxime Boudreault	23.5
7	(United States) Thomas Evans	23
8	(Scotland) Luke Stoltman	22
9	(Ukraine) Oleksii Novikov	21.5
10	(United States) Trey Mitchell	11.5
