= Tristain Hoath =

Canadian strongman

Personal information
- Nationality: Canadian
- Born: 29 October 1991 (age 35)
- Occupation: Strongman
- Height: 6 ft 2 in (1.88 m)
- Weight: 150 kg (331 lb)
Medal record
Strongman
Representing Canada
World's Strongest Man
5th	2024 World's Strongest Man
Qualified	2025 World's Strongest Man
Qualified	2026 World's Strongest Man
Shaw Classic
13th	2024 Strongest Man on Earth
7th	2025 Strongest Man on Earth
Rogue Invitational
10th	2024 Rogue Invitational
Strongman Champions League
1st	2024 SCL Martinique
1st	2025 SCL USA
2nd	2026 SCL Florida
1st	2026 SCL Turkiye
10th	2026 SCL World Finals
Magnús Ver Magnússon Strongman Classic
1st	2023 MVMSC
2nd	2024 MVMSC
North America's Strongest Man
3rd	2024 NASM
Canada's Strongest Man
5th	2021 Canada's Strongest Man
6th	2023 Canada's Strongest Man
1st	2025 Canada's Strongest Man
Western Canada's Strongest Man
5th	2022 WSCM
2nd	2023 WCSM

Tristain Hoath (born 29 October 1991) is a Canadian Strongman from Saskatoon. He's the reigning Canada's Strongest Man.

== Career ==
Hoath started his career in 2021 with Canada's Strongest Man. Then he was selected for Western Canada's Strongest Man and North America's Strongest Man where he placed second and third respectively. He then managed to win 2023 Magnús Ver Magnússon Strongman Classic and 2024 Strongman Champions League Martinique.

In his first appearance at World's Strongest Man competition in 2024 held in Myrtle Beach, South Carolina, he emerged fifth. In his second appearance in 2025, he finished fourth in his heat and did not advance to the final.

Hoath debuted at the Strongest Man on Earth in 2024, finishing 13th. He made a second appearance in 2025, ultimately finishing 7th after winning the Super Yoke event.

Hoath claimed his third senior Strongman title in August 2025, taking 74.5 points from a maximum of 78 to win Canada's Strongest Man from James Jeffers in second and Gabriel Rheaume in third. A fourth followed in September 2025, with Hoath taking the SCL USA on countback from America's Nick Wortham.

Hoath works as a police officer in Edmonton.

== Personal records ==
During competitions:

- Deadlift (with multi-ply suit and straps) – 420 kg (926 lb) (2025 World Deadlift Championships and Strongman Open)
- Raw Deadlift (with straps) – 393 kg (866 lb) (2024 Strongest Man on Earth)
- Log press – 184 kg (406 lb) (2024 North America's Strongest Man)
- Axle press – 180 kg (397 lb) (2024 World's Strongest Man)
- Squat – 317.5 kg (700 lb) x 7 reps (2026 World's Strongest Man)
- Manhood Stone (Max Atlas Stone) – 227 kg (500 lb) x 2 reps over 4 ft bar (2025 Strongest Man on Earth)
- Húsafell Stone carry (around the pen) – 186 kg (410 lb) for 56.86 metres (186 ft 7 in) (around 1.7 revolutions) (2023 Magnús Ver Magnússon Classic)
- Rock press – 134 kg (295 lb) (2024 Magnús Ver Magnússon Strongman Classic)
- Safe Yoke – 643 kg (1,418 lb) for 6 meters in 11.85 seconds (2025 Strongest Man on Earth) (World Record)
- Keg toss (for height) – 15 kg (33 lb) over 6.10 metres (20 ft 0 in) (2024 Strongest Man on Earth)
- Keg toss (for weight) – 31.8 kg (70 lb) over 4.57 metres (15 ft 0 in) (2025 Strongest Man on Earth)

During training:

- Deadlift (with multi-ply suit and straps) – 432.5 kg (953 lb)
- Raw Deadlift (with straps) – 420 kg (926 lb)
- Raw Bench press – 227 kg (500 lb)
