= Evan Singleton =

American strongman and professional wrestler

Personal information
- Born: October 9, 1992 (age 34)
- Height: 198 cm (6 ft 6 in)
- Weight: 159 kg (351 lb)

Sport
- Sport: Strongman, Wrestling
Medal record
Strongman
Representing United States
World's Strongest Man
Qualified	2020 World's Strongest Man
Qualified	2021 World's Strongest Man
Qualified	2022 World's Strongest Man
5th	2023 World's Strongest Man
3rd	2024 World's Strongest Man
Qualified	2025 World's Strongest Man
Qualified	2026 World's Strongest Man
Arnold Strongman Classic
7th	2024 Arnold Strongman Classic
6th	2025 Arnold Strongman Classic
Shaw Classic
5th	2021 Shaw Classic
8th	2022 Shaw Classic
4th	2023 Strongest Man on Earth
6th	2024 Strongest Man on Earth
1st	2025 Strongest Man on Earth
Rogue Invitational
4th	2023 Rogue Invitational
4th	2024 Rogue Invitational
Giants Live
8th	2018 North American Open
1st	2019 North American Open
5th	2019 World Tour Finals
2nd	2021 Strongman Classic
1st	2021 World Open
3rd	2021 World Tour Finals
1st	2021 Arnold UK
3rd	2022 Strongman Classic
9th	2022 World Open
1st	2023 Strongman Classic
1st	2023 World Open
12th	2024 Strongman Classic
4th	2024 World Open
9th	2024 US Strongman Championship
1st	2025 Strongman Classic
11th	2025 World Open
11th	2026 Strongman Classic
4th	2026 World Tour Finals
Arnold Pro Strongman World Series
5th	2019 Africa
3rd	2019 Forts de Warwick
North America's Strongest Man
7th	2026 NASM
America's Strongest Man
2nd	2026 ASM
Official Strongman Games
8th	2018 Official Strongman Games

Evan Singleton is an American strongman and former professional wrestler. In the WWE, he wrestled under the name Adam Mercer. As a strongman, he is the reigning Strongest Man on Earth.

Known by his nickname T-Rex, Singleton has also won 6 more international strongman competitions under the Giants Live franchise: 2019 North American Open, 2021 World Open, 2021 Arnold UK, 2023 Strongman Classic, 2023 World Open, and 2025 Strongman Classic.

== Professional wrestling career ==
Adam Mercer
Personal information
- Born: Lancaster, Pennsylvania

Professional wrestling career
- Billed height: 6 ft 6 in (198 cm)
- Billed weight: 255 lb (116 kg)
- Trained by: CZW Wrestling School
- Debut: March 24, 2012

When he was 18, Singleton signed for World Wrestling Entertainment and competed under the name 'Adam Mercer'.

=== Florida Championship Wrestling/NXT ===
Singleton joined WWE's developmental promotion Florida Championship Wrestling, before it became solely known as WWE NXT as Adam Mercer during March 2012. At 19 years of age, Mercer was the youngest NXT member in the program's history. Despite his impressive physical credentials, Mercer wrestled a sparse series of matches, most of which were losses to notable up-and-coming wrestlers including Big E. Langston, Brad Maddox and Erick Rowan. Mercer participated on August 1 in a losing fatal four-way tag match, teaming with Chad Baxter, against The Ascension (Conor O'Brian and Kenneth Cameron), Jason Jordan and Mike Dalton and Brad Maddox and Rick Victor.

Mercer's last match in WWE/NXT was on September 27 in a squash match against Erick Rowan. During the match, Mercer sustained what he described as a "serious head injury", causing him to retire. He later joined Vito LaGrasso's lawsuit against the company in 2015, though the lawsuit was thrown out by a judge in 2018.

== Strongman career ==
After his wrestling career ended, he had a brief spell in bodybuilding before coming across a man log-lifting at his local gym in Lancaster, struck up a conversation and within two weeks had decided strongman was his sport.

Evan's professional debut was North Carolina's Strongest Man and in 2018 he made his first Giants Live appearance at the North American Open. A year later, he returned to record his first large contest victory.

In 2020 he made his competitive debut at World’s Strongest Man after attending the previous year as an alternate and equipment tester. A biceps injury prevented him from progressing from his heat. More bad luck followed in 2021 when, once again, his WSM aspirations were thwarted by food poisoning.

In 2021, Evan won the Giants Live World Open and Arnold UK shows, as well as deadlifted 1,000 lb (453.5 kg) in competition. At that point, Singleton began claiming himself to be a World's Strongest Man contender.

In September 2022, Singleton suffered another biceps injury during a training session which put him out of the Giants Live World Tour Finals and Rogue Invitational that were held during October of that year. He underwent surgery to reattach his biceps tendon hoping to recover in time to prepare for the 2023 World's Strongest Man.

In 2023, Singleton made the World's Strongest Man final for the first time, finishing 5th. Singleton would win two Giants Live shows that year: the Strongman Classic at Royal Albert Hall and World Open in Cardiff. He would also place 4th at both the Strongest Man on Earth Competition at the Shaw Classic and the Rogue Invitational.

In 2024, Singleton would compete at the Arnold Strongman Classic for the first time, placing 7th. He had to withdraw late into the competition with an injury. At the World's Strongest Man in May, Singleton made the podium, coming in 3rd. This was despite injuring his foot on the first event, the frame carry. Singleton would then finish 6th at the Strongest Man on Earth in August and 4th at the Rogue Invitational in October.

In 2025, Singleton would start his season placing 6th at the Arnold Strongman Classic in Ohio. In May, Singleton was forced to withdraw from the World's Strongest Man in the heats after picking up an injury during the first event. Two months later, he picked up his 6th international title by winning the Giants Live Strongman Classic at the Royal Albert Hall in London, England. Singleton won two of the five events, ultimately finishing 1.5 points clear of second-placed Jaco Schoonwinkel. In August he won his biggest title of his career Strongest Man on Earth at the Shaw Classic, defeating the likes of Lucas Hatton, Thomas Evans and 13 others.

== Personal records ==
Strongman:

- Equipped Deadlift – 455 kg (1,003 lb) (with suit and straps) (2023 Giants Live World Open)
- Standard bar Raw Deadlift – 420 kg (926 lb) (without suit and with straps) (2024 Strongest Man on Earth)
- Elephant bar Raw Deadlift – 438 kg (966 lb) (without suit and with straps) (2025 Arnold Strongman Classic)
- Trap bar Deadlift (from 12 inches) – 514.5 kg (1,134 lb) (2025 Strongest Man on Earth) (Joint-World Record)
- Log Press – 200 kg (441 lb) (2025 Strongest Man on Earth)
- Axle Press – 190 kg (419 lb) (2024 World's Strongest Man)
- Cyr Dumbbell Press – 140 kg (309 lb)(2023 World's Strongest Man)
- Standing keg drop chest press – 170–258.5 kg (375–570 lb) x 9 weights (2025 Strongest Man on Earth)
- Keg toss (for weight) – 31.8 kg (70 lb) over 4.57 metres (15 ft 0 in) (2025 Strongest Man on Earth)
- Keg toss (for height) – 7.5 m (25 ft) (2024 World's Strongest Man)
- Medley – 453.5 kg (1,000 lb) yoke for 20m course into 330 kg (728 lb) frame carry for 20m course in 30.21 seconds (2024 World's Strongest Man) (World Record)
- Medley – 160 kg (353 lb) per hand farmers walk for 15m course into 200 kg (441 lb) anchor & chain drag for 15m course in 27.38 seconds (2021 Giants Live World Open) (World Record)
- Hercules Hold - 200 KG (441 Lbs.) each hand for 89.84 Seconds (American Record)

Done in Training:

- Log Press – 204 kg (450 lb)
- Cyr Dumbbell Press – 140.5 kg (310 lb)
- Behind The Neck Push Press – 250 kg (551 lb)
- Squat – 403.5 kg (890 lb)
- Bench Press – 276.5 kg (610 lb)
- Deadlift – 456.5 kg (1,006 lb)
- 18-Inch Deadlift – 499 kg (1,100 lb)

== Competitive record ==
Winning percentage: 18.42%
Podium percentage: 31.58%

	1st	2nd	3rd	Podium	4th	5th	6th	7th	8th	9th	10th	11th	12th	13th	18th	21st	29th	Total
International competitions	7	1	4	12	3	2	2	2	2	2	0	2	1	1	1	1	1	38

== Bodybuilding ==
Year	Body	Competition	Division	Placing
2015	NPC	Atlantic State Championships	Junior	7th

== Filmography ==
=== Television ===
Year	Title	Role	Notes
2020–2026	World's Strongest Man	Himself – Competitor	
2026	Battle of the Beasts	Himself – Competitor	
