= 2026 Arnold Strongman Classic =

Arnold Strongman Classic event of 2025

Competition information
- Dates: 6 – 7 March 2026
- Venue: Greater Columbus Convention Center
- Location: Ohio, Columbus
- Country: United States
- Athletes participating: 9
- Nations participating: 2

Champion(s)
- (Canada) Mitchell Hooper

The 2026 Arnold Strongman Classic was the 24th Arnold Strongman Classic competition which took place in Columbus, Ohio from 6–7 March 2026 at the Greater Columbus Convention Center.

== Participants ==
- Austin Andrade (USA)
- Andrew Burton (USA)
- Bryce Johnson (USA)
- Lucas Hatton (USA)
- Mitchell Hooper (CAN)
- Martins Licis (USA)
- Nick Guardione (USA)
- Thomas Evans (USA)
- Trey Mitchell (USA)

== Event results ==
=== Event 1: Elephant bar max deadlift ===
- Time Limit: 60 seconds per lift
- Notes: 3 lifts per athlete, weights to be submitted before each round.

#	Athlete	Nation	Weight	Event Points	Overall Points
1	Mitchell Hooper	Canada	445 kilograms (981 lb)	9	9
2	Austin Andrade	United States	443 kilograms (977 lb)	8	8
3	Bryce Johnson	United States	431 kilograms (950 lb)	7	7
4	Lucas Hatton	United States	425 kilograms (937 lb)	6	6
5	Trey Mitchell	United States	420 kilograms (930 lb)	5	5
6	Thomas Evans	United States	413 kilograms (911 lb)	4	4
7	Martins Licis	United States	411 kilograms (906 lb)	3	3
8	Andrew Burton	United States	388 kilograms (855 lb)	2	2
9	Nick Guardione	United States	384 kilograms (847 lb)	1	1

=== Event 2: Dumbbell press ===
- Weight: 10 dumbbells to choose from ranging from 114 to 147 kilograms (250–325 lb)
- Time Limit: 1 minute 30 seconds
- Notes: Any higher weight repetition beats multiple lower weight repetitions

#	Athlete	Nation	Repetitions	Event Points	Overall Points
1	Mitchell Hooper	Canada	1 (136 kilograms / 300 lbs)	8.5	17.5
1	Lucas Hatton	United States	1 (136 kilograms / 300 lbs)	8.5	14.5
3	Austin Andrade	United States	1 (127 kilograms / 280 lbs)	6.5	14.5
3	Trey Mitchell	United States	1 (127 kilograms / 280 lbs)	6.5	11.5
5	Thomas Evans	United States	1 (124 kilograms / 274 lbs)	4.5	9.5
5	Nick Guardione	United States	1 (124 kilograms / 274 lbs)	4.5	5.5
7	Martins Licis	United States	1 (113 kilograms / 250 lbs)	3	6
8	Bryce Johnson	United States	0	0	7
8	Andrew Burton	United States	0	0	2

=== Event 3: Stone to shoulder ===
- Weight: 186 kilograms (410 lb) Odd Haugen's tombstone
- Time Limit: 2 minutes
- Notes: If 2 athletes were tied for repetitions the athlete who got the stone to their lap on the next rep would place higher.

#	Athlete	Nation	Repetitions	Event Points	Overall Points
1	Austin Andrade	United States	3	9	23.5
2	Martins Licis	United States	3	8	14
3	Bryce Johnson	United States	2	7	14
4	Mitchell Hooper	Canada	2	6	23.5
5	Trey Mitchell	United States	2	5	16.5
6	Thomas Evans	United States	1	4	12.5
7	Nick Guardione	United States	0	3	8.5
8	Lucas Hatton	United States	0	0	14.5
8	Andrew Burton	United States	0	0	2

=== Event 4: Carry & drag ===
- Weight: Athletes carry the Dinnie stones weighing 188 kilograms (414 lb) and 144.5 kilograms (319 lb) each down the course and put them on to a sled. Athletes then pull the sled which weighs 885.5 kilograms (1,952 lb) back down the course.
- Time limit: 2 minutes
- Course length: 10.67 metres (35.0 ft)

#	Athlete	Nation	Time	Event Points	Overall Points
1	Martins Licis	United States	1:31.23	9	23
2	Bryce Johnson	United States	1:31.97	8	22
3	Nick Guardione	United States	7.92 metres (26.0 ft)	7	15.5
4	Mitchell Hooper	Canada	7.54 metres (24.7 ft)	6	29.5
5	Thomas Evans	United States	6.98 metres (22.9 ft)	5	17.5
6	Andrew Burton	United States	6.88 metres (22.6 ft)	4	6
7	Lucas Hatton	United States	5.77 metres (18.9 ft)	3	17.5
8	Austin Andrade	United States	4.29 metres (14.1 ft)	2	25.5
9	Trey Mitchell	United States	3.86 metres (12.7 ft)	1	17.5

=== Event 5: Austrian oak ===
- Weight: 195 kilograms (430 lb) Heavy log. 175 kilograms (386 lb) Light log. For max repetitions.
- Time Limit: 90 Seconds
- Notes: Repetitions on the heavy log gained more points than repetitions on the light log.

#	Athlete	Nation	Repetitions	Event Points	Overall Points
1	Trey Mitchell	United States	5 (195 kilograms / 430 lbs)	9	26.5
2	Thomas Evans	United States	4 (195 kilograms / 430 lbs)	7.5	25
2	Lucas Hatton	United States	4 (195 kilograms / 430 lbs)	7.5	25
4	Mitchell Hooper	Canada	3 (195 kilograms / 430 lbs)	5.5	35
4	Austin Andrade	United States	3 (195 kilograms / 430 lbs)	5.5	31
6	Martins Licis	United States	2 (195 kilograms / 430 lbs)	4	27
7	Bryce Johnson	United States	1 (195 kilograms / 430 lbs)	2.5	24.5
7	Nick Guardione	United States	1 (195 kilograms / 430 lbs)	2.5	18
9	Andrew Burton	United States	0 (175 kilograms / 385 lbs)	0	6

=== Event 6: Ramp rage ===
- Weight: 3 bags weighing 136 kilograms (300 lb), 158.8 kilograms (350 lb) and 170 kilograms (370 lb) up a ramp.
- Time Limit: 1 minute 30 seconds

#	Athlete	Nation	Time	Event Points	Overall Points
1	Nick Guardione	United States	3 in 38.79	9	27
2	Andrew Burton	United States	3 in 44.18	8	14
3	Martins Licis	United States	3 in 49.41	7	34
4	Lucas Hatton	United States	3 in 49.65	6	31
5	Trey Mitchell	United States	3 in 1:17.37	5	31.5
6	Austin Andrade	United States	3 in 1:21.08	4	35
7	Bryce Johnson	United States	2 bags	3	27.5
8	Thomas Evans	United States	2 bags	2	27
9	Mitchell Hooper	Canada	2 bags	1	36

== Final standings ==
#	Athlete	Nation	Points
1st place, gold medalist(s)	Mitchell Hooper	Canada	36
2nd place, silver medalist(s)	Austin Andrade	United States	35
3rd place, bronze medalist(s)	Martins Licis	United States	34
4	Trey Mitchell	United States	31.5
5	Lucas Hatton	United States	31
6	Bryce Johnson	United States	27.5
7	Nick Guardione	United States	27
8	Thomas Evans	United States	27
9	Andrew Burton	United States	14

Preceded by 2025 Arnold Strongman Classic	Arnold Strongman Classic	Succeeded by 2027 Arnold Strongman Classic
