= Shaw Classic =

Strongman competition run and hosted by Brian Shaw

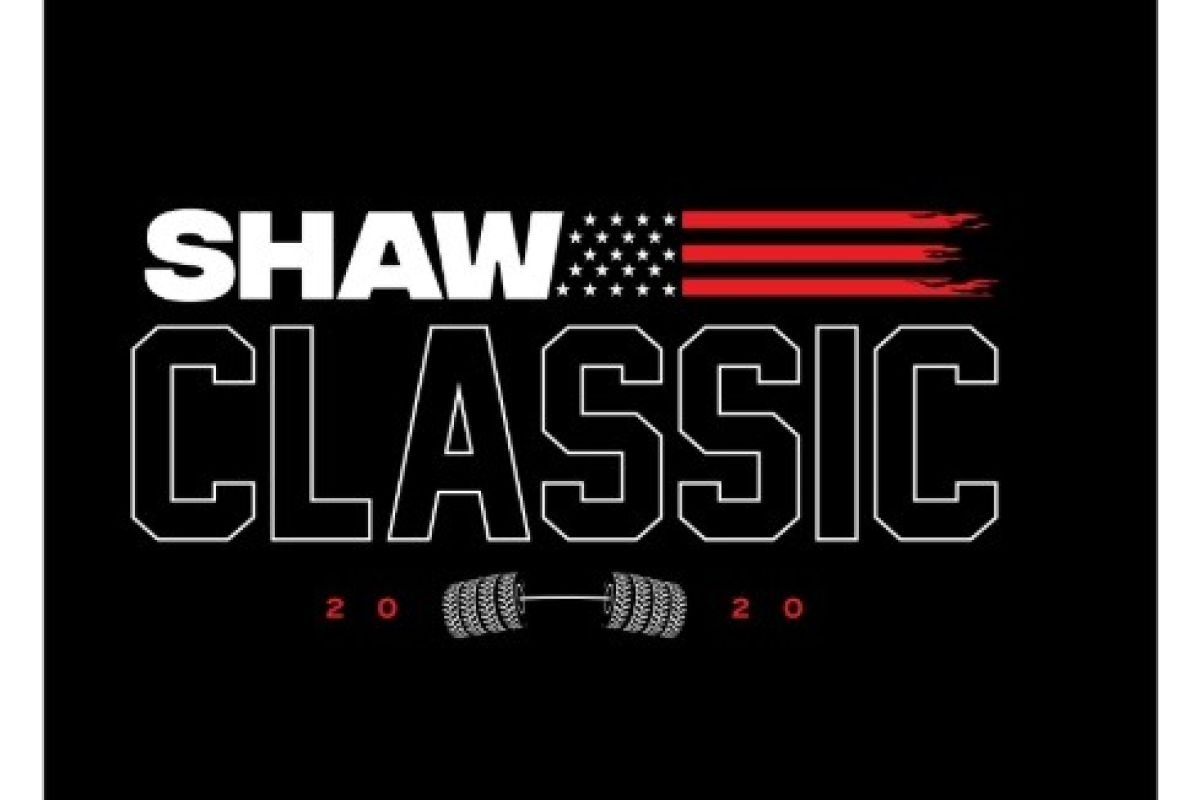
- The Shaw Classic logo

Tournament information
- Location: Colorado
- Established: 2020; 6 years ago
- Number of tournaments: 6
- Format: Multi-event competition
- Venue: Blue FCU Arena
- Website: theshawclassic.com

Current champion
- (United States) Evan Singleton

Most recent tournament
- 2025 Shaw Classic

The Shaw Classic was a strongman competition run and hosted by four-time World's Strongest Man Brian Shaw, who won the inaugural competition in 2020. The second edition of the contest had 16 athletes with backgrounds from Europe and North America. The total prize pool in 2020 was $53,900. In 2021 the prize pool increased to $100,000 and in 2022 the prize pool increased to $150,000. In 2023 the prize pool was $251,932 followed by $263,200 in 2024 but dropped to $178,750 in 2025.

From 2023 to 2025, the Shaw Classic's invitational event was branded as Strongest Man on Earth, formerly used by the Fortissimus strongman competition held in 2008 and 2009.

== History ==
The first Shaw Classic was held in 2020 in the midst of the COVID-19 pandemic. With many major events for the year canceled or modified, Brian Shaw invited nine other athletes to compete in a closed competition in his private gym in Colorado. This was filmed and released shortly after. Shaw won the inaugural contest.

The 2021 contest allowed live spectators. Trey Mitchell won this edition, with Shaw and Jean-Francois Caron coming in 2nd and 3rd, respectively.

2022 added an open men's and women's competition in addition to the invitational, which remained men's only. Trey Mitchell repeated as champion, winning by one point over Shaw, who again came in 2nd. Mitchell Hooper came in 3rd in his first appearance at the competition.

In 2023, the show's invitational was branded the "Strongest Man On Earth," a title used earlier by the Fortissimus contests. Shaw won the title for a second time in his last career competition. In 2024, Mitchell Hooper came in first place, after placing second to Shaw the prior year.

Shaw announced a new formal qualification system for 2025: The previous year's top-5 finishers at Strongest Man on Earth and the podium finishers from World's Strongest Man, Arnold Strongman Classic, and Rogue Invitational. Next, the winner of North America's Strongest Man and winner of the Shaw Classic Men's Open would all receive automatic invites, with at-large invitations for athletes that performed well at other elite competitions like the Magnus ver Magnusson Strongman Classic to bring the field to a complete sixteen competitors.

On 27th December 2025, on the Shaw Strength Podcast, Brian and Keri Shaw stated that the Strongest Man on Earth would not be taking place in 2026. Subsequently, on 18th May 2026, Brian announced on the Shaw Strength podcast that the Shaw Classic would not be coming back in the foreseeable future, and that they had decided to liquidate all of the equipment from the shows.

== Podium breakdown ==
=== Pro Men ===
(From 2023 onwards, the competition is known as 'Strongest Man on Earth')

Year	Winner	Runner-up	Third place
2020	(United States) Brian Shaw	(Canada) Jean-François Caron	(Ukraine) Oleksii Novikov
2021	(United States) Trey Mitchell	(United States) Brian Shaw	(Canada) Jean-François Caron
2022	(United States) Trey Mitchell	(United States) Brian Shaw	(Canada) Mitchell Hooper
2023	(United States) Brian Shaw	(Canada) Mitchell Hooper	(United Kingdom) Tom Stoltman
2024	(Canada) Mitchell Hooper	(Iceland) Hafþór Júlíus Björnsson	(United States) Lucas Hatton
2025	(United States) Evan Singleton	(United States) Lucas Hatton	(United States) Thomas Evans

=== Open Men ===
Year	Winner	Runner-up	Third place
2022	(United States) Thomas Evans	(Canada) Joey Lavallée	(Canada) Wesley Derwinsky
2023	(United States) Austin Andrade	(Canada) Wesley Derwinsky	(Canada) Joey Lavallée
2024	(United States) Joshua Spurgeon	(United States) Nicholas Guardione	(United States) Tim Buck
2025	(England) Ben Glasscock	(United States) Zachary Price	(Sweden) Fredrik Johansson

=== Open Women ===
Year	Winner	Runner-up	Third place
2022	(United States) Victoria Long	(Ukraine) Olga Liashchuk	(United States) Cori Butler
2023	(Ukraine) Olga Liashchuk	(Canada) Samantha Belliveau	(Canada) Melissa Peacock
2024	(Canada) Melissa Peacock	(Australia) Nicole Genrich	(United States) Nadia Stowers
2025	(United States) Jennifer Lyle	(Canada) Jackie Osczevski	(United States) Jackie Rhodes

=== Lightweight Men ===
Year	Winner	Runner-up	Third place
2024	(United States) Alec Soukup	(United States) Matthew McQuiston	(United States) John Alimo
2025	(United States) Tyler Pruitt	(United States) Jordan Wychulis	(United States) Sean Mullican

=== Lightweight Women ===
Year	Winner	Runner-up	Third place
2024	(United States) Kira Wrixon	(Canada) Taylor Woods	(Canada) Holly McRae
2025	(United States) Megan Davis	(Australia) Camilla Fogagnolo	(Canada) Taylor Woods

== Classic results ==
=== 2020 Shaw Classic ===
#	Athlete	Nation	Points
1st place, gold medalist(s)	Brian Shaw	United States	47.5
2nd place, silver medalist(s)	Jean-François Caron	Canada	44.5
3rd place, bronze medalist(s)	Oleksii Novikov	Ukraine	40
4	Trey Mitchell	United States	35.5
5	Jerry Pritchett	United States	33.5
6	Adam Bishop	United Kingdom	31
7	Luke Stoltman	United Kingdom	30.5
8	Maxime Boudreault	Canada	29.5
9	Kevin Faires	United States	27
10	Terry Hollands	United Kingdom	5

=== 2021 Shaw Classic ===
#	Athlete	Nation	Points
1st place, gold medalist(s)	Trey Mitchell	United States	104.5
2nd place, silver medalist(s)	Brian Shaw	United States	101.5
3rd place, bronze medalist(s)	Jean-François Caron	Canada	99
4	Kevin Faires	United States	83
5	Evan Singleton	United States	80
6	Bobby Thompson	United States	75.5
7	Adam Bishop	United Kingdom	74
8	Maxime Boudreault	Canada	70
9	Aivars Šmaukstelis	Latvia	69
10	Konstantine Janashia	Georgia	60
11	Graham Hicks	United Kingdom	56.5
12	Zydrunas Savickas	Lithuania	36
13	Gabriel Rheaume	Canada	32
14	Gabriel Pena	Mexico	29.5
15	Jerry Pritchett	United States	23
16	Mikhail Shivlyakov	Russia	22.5

=== 2022 Shaw Classic ===
#	Athlete	Nation	Points
1st place, gold medalist(s)	Trey Mitchell	United States	100.5
2nd place, silver medalist(s)	Brian Shaw	United States	99.5
3rd place, bronze medalist(s)	Mitchell Hooper	Canada	95
4	Oleksii Novikov	Ukraine	79
5	Maxime Boudreault	Canada	70
6	Kevin Faires	United States	68
7	Aivars Šmaukstelis	Latvia	67.5
8	Evan Singleton	United States	59.5
9	Konstantine Janashia	Georgia	52
10	Zydrunas Savickas	Lithuania	49.5
11	Bobby Thompson	United States	42
12	Gabriel Pena	Mexico	39
13	Gabriel Rheaume	Canada	36.5
14	Jerry Pritchett	United States	27
15	Luke Stoltman	United Kingdom	1

=== 2023 Shaw Classic - Strongest Man on Earth ===
#	Athlete	Nation	Points
1st place, gold medalist(s)	Brian Shaw	United States	96
2nd place, silver medalist(s)	Mitchell Hooper	Canada	89
3rd place, bronze medalist(s)	Tom Stoltman	United Kingdom	83
4	Evan Singleton	United States	77.5
5	Trey Mitchell	United States	73
6	Thomas Evans	United States	64
7	Bobby Thompson	United States	62
8	Maxime Boudreault	Canada	57
9	Kevin Faires	United States	49
10	Oleksii Novikov	Ukraine	44
11	Gavin Bilton	Wales	43
12	Aivars Šmaukstelis	Latvia	41
13	Luke Stoltman	United Kingdom	32.5
14	Adam Bishop	United Kingdom	8

=== 2024 Shaw Classic - Strongest Man on Earth ===
#	Athlete	Nation	Points
1st place, gold medalist(s)	Mitchell Hooper	Canada	117
2nd place, silver medalist(s)	Hafþór Júlíus Björnsson	Iceland	108
3rd place, bronze medalist(s)	Lucas Hatton	United States	83
4	Trey Mitchell	United States	79.5
5	Austin Andrade	United States	75.5
6	Evan Singleton	United States	70
7	Tom Stoltman	United Kingdom	68.5
8	Bobby Thompson	United States	63.5
9	Wesley Derwinsky	Canada	61.5
10	Thomas Evans	United States	57
11	Maxime Boudreault	Canada	41
12	Mathew Ragg	New Zealand	40
13	Tristain Hoath	Canada	38
14	Aivars Šmaukstelis	Latvia	38
15	Pavlo Kordiyaka	Ukraine	35
16	Oleksii Novikov	Ukraine	29.5

=== 2025 Shaw Classic - Strongest Man on Earth ===
#	Athlete	Nation	Points
1st place, gold medalist(s)	Evan Singleton	United States	93.5
2nd place, silver medalist(s)	Lucas Hatton	United States	92.5
3rd place, bronze medalist(s)	Thomas Evans	United States	88
4	Austin Andrade	United States	83.5
5	Bryce Johnson	United States	82.5
6	Trey Mitchell	United States	82.5
7	Tristain Hoath	Canada	72.5
8	Tom Stoltman	United Kingdom	72.5
9	Wesley Derwinsky	Canada	64.5
10	Ondrej Fojtu	Czech Republic	63.5
11	Eddie Williams	Australia	62
12	Nick Guardione	United States	60.5
13	Joshua Spurgeon	United States	58.5
14	Maxime Boudreault	Canada	58
15	Shane Flowers	United Kingdom	21
16	Bobby Thompson	United States	14.5

== Open results ==
=== 2022 ===
2022 Shaw Classic Open (Men)
#	Athlete	Nation	Points
1st place, gold medalist(s)	Thomas Evans	United States	62.5
2nd place, silver medalist(s)	Joey Lavallee	Canada	61.5
3rd place, bronze medalist(s)	Wesley Derwinsky	Canada	58.5
4	Sean Hayes	Canada	53
4	Jack Plankers	United States	53
6	Austin Andrade	United States	50.5
7	Lucas Nail	United States	47.5
8	Bryce Johnson	United States	44
9	Andrew Montoya	United States	41
10	Andy Black	United Kingdom	38.5
11	Tim Buck	United States	37
12	Trevor Siemonsma	United States	33
13	Brian Clark	United States	31.5
14	Alex Kelley	United States	26
15	Ayyub Mohammad	Germany	23.5
16	Joe Stella	United States	18

2022 Shaw Classic Open (Women)
#	Athlete	Nation	Points
1st place, gold medalist(s)	Victoria Long	United States	49.5
2nd place, silver medalist(s)	Olga Liashchuk	Ukraine	38.5
3rd place, bronze medalist(s)	Cori Butler	United States	34.5
4	Nancy Johnson	United States	31.5
5	Samantha Belliveau	Canada	31
6	Jackie Osczevski	Canada	28.5
7	Bailey Deschene	Canada	22.5
8	Rebecca Houston	United States	13.5
9	Monica Johnson	United States	11.5
10	Taylor Woods	Canada	8

=== 2023 ===
2023 Shaw Classic Open (Men)
#	Athlete	Nation	Points
1st place, gold medalist(s)	Austin Andrade	United States	65
2nd place, silver medalist(s)	Wesley Derwinsky	Canada	59
3rd place, bronze medalist(s)	Joey Lavallee	Canada	58.5
4	Brett Thompson	United States	57.5
5	Tim Buck	United States	54.5
6	Nathan Goltry	United States	51.5
7	Tristain Hoath	Canada	48
8	James Jeffers	Canada	44
9	Bryce Johnson	United States	42
10	Nicholas Guardione	United States	41.5
11	Josh Gregory	United States	32.5
12	Zach Price	United States	31.5
13	Alexander Kopp	United States	28
13	Josh Spurgeon	United States	28
15	Andrew Montoya	United States	27
16	Donald Treglia	United States	10.5

2023 Shaw Classic Open (Women)
#	Athlete	Nation	Points
1st place, gold medalist(s)	Olga Liashchuk	Ukraine	67
2nd place, silver medalist(s)	Samantha Belliveau	Canada	63
3rd place, bronze medalist(s)	Melissa Peacock	Canada	60
4	Jackie Osczevki	Canada	52
5	Cori Butler	United States	47
6	Jackie Rhodes	United States	41
7	Rebecca Houston	United States	30
7	Morgan Irons	United States	30
9	Stephanie Bisignano	Canada	28
10	Austyn Grubb	United States	27
11	Jessica Trumbull	United States	18
12	Joscelyne O'Brien	Canada	11.5
13	Laura De Berdt Romilly	Canada	8
13	Angela Highfield	United States	8

=== 2024 ===
2024 Shaw Classic Open (Men)
#	Athlete	Nation	Points
1st place, gold medalist(s)	Joshua Spurgeon	United States	52.5
2nd place, silver medalist(s)	Nicholas Guardione	United States	50
3rd place, bronze medalist(s)	Timothy Buck	United States	47
4	Joey Lavelle	Canada	45
5	Andrew Burton	United States	43.5
6	James Jeffers	Canada	37.5
7	Alexander Koop	United States	36
8	Nicholas Smith	United States	25
9	Jon Furrh	United States	23
10	Josh Gregory	United States	12.5

2024 Shaw Classic Open (Women)
#	Athlete	Nation	Points
1st place, gold medalist(s)	Melissa Peacock	Canada	57.5
2nd place, silver medalist(s)	Nicole Genrich	Australia	47.5
3rd place, bronze medalist(s)	Nadia Stowers	United States	45.5
4	Erin Murray	United States	45.5
5	Nancy Johnson	United States	38.5
6	Jackie Osczevski	Canada	37
7	Ashley Crawford	United States	37
8	Jennifer Lyle	United States	34.5
9	Jackie Rhodes	United States	26.5
10	Laura De Berdt Romilly	Canada	15.5

2024 Shaw Classic Lightweight (Men)
#	Athlete	Nation	Points
1st place, gold medalist(s)	Alec Soukup	United States	62.5
2nd place, silver medalist(s)	Matthew McQuiston	United States	55.5
3rd place, bronze medalist(s)	John Alimo	United States	50
4	Richard Mocygemba	United States	49
5	Jack Turner	United States	40.5
6	Philup Brinkman	United States	36
7	Josh Harrelson	United States	34
8	Nick Strauss	United States	24.5
9	Harry Walker	United States	18
10	Blake Hoffman	United States	15

2024 Shaw Classic Lightweight (Women)
#	Athlete	Nation	Points
1st place, gold medalist(s)	Kira Wrixon	United States	56
2nd place, silver medalist(s)	Taylor Woods	Canada	49
3rd place, bronze medalist(s)	Holly McRae	Canada	46.5
4	Krystal Stanczyk	United States	38
5	Stacey Burr	United States	37
6	Kristin Ellis	United States	35.5
7	Diana Ferrer	Mexico	35
8	Nadia Morrison	United States	33.5
9	Heidi Ellen Humar	Australia	29
10	Jamie Strong	United States	21.5

=== 2025 ===
2025 Shaw Classic Open (Men)
#	Athlete	Nation	Points
1st place, gold medalist(s)	Ben Glasscock	England	55
2nd place, silver medalist(s)	Zachary Price	United States	53.5
3rd place, bronze medalist(s)	Fredrik Johansson	Sweden	46.5
4	Seth Soukup	United States	45
5	Josh Gregory	United States	40
6	Beau Bathery	United States	33.5
7	Quinten Holley	United States	33
8	Alex Kelley	United States	29.5
9	Connor Aaron Hunt	United States	27.5
10	Jon Furrh	United States	15.5

2025 Shaw Classic Open (Women)
#	Athlete	Nation	Points
1st place, gold medalist(s)	Jennifer Lyle	Canada	54.5
2nd place, silver medalist(s)	Jackie Osczevski	United States	50.5
3rd place, bronze medalist(s)	Jackie Rhodes	United States	50
4	Nancy Johnson	United States	46
5	Erin Murray	United States	45.5
6	Kira Wrixon	United States	40.5
7	Rebecca Houston	United States	35.5
8	Nicole Wight	Australia	21
9	Cheyenne Ruiz	United States	21
10	Trisha Mank	United States	19.5

2025 Shaw Classic Lightweight (Men)
#	Athlete	Nation	Points
1st place, gold medalist(s)	Tyler Pruitt	United States	52
2nd place, silver medalist(s)	Jordan Wychulis	United States	49.5
3rd place, bronze medalist(s)	Sean Mullican	United States	46.5
4	Kevin Candito	United States	44.5
5	Christopher Otero	United States	40
6	Derek Brooks	United States	35
7	Joe Korasick	United States	34
8	Gabe Deal	United States	31.5
9	Bodie Giron	United States	25.5
10	Skye Olsen	United States	25.5

2025 Shaw Classic Lightweight (Women)
#	Athlete	Nation	Points
1st place, gold medalist(s)	Megan Davis	United States	59.5
2nd place, silver medalist(s)	Camilla Fogagnolo	Australia	57.5
3rd place, bronze medalist(s)	Taylor Woods	Canada	46
4	Diana Ferrer	Mexico	46
5	Kristin Ellis	United States	43
6	Holly McRae	Canada	31.5
7	Hanna Coldiron	United States	28.5
8	Jamie Strong	United States	26.5
9	Savannah Schepp	United States	26.5
10	Alex Martin	United States	19
