= 2024 World's Strongest Man =

Strongman competition in 2024

Competition information
- Dates: 1-5 May 2024
- Location: Myrtle Beach, South Carolina
- Country: United States
- Athletes participating: 30
- Nations participating: 15

Champion(s)
- (United Kingdom) Tom Stoltman

The 2024 World's Strongest Man was the 47th World's Strongest Man competition that took place in Myrtle Beach, South Carolina from May 1 to 5, 2024.

== Participants ==
This year's competition welcomed 11 new faces to the competition, and included 5 notable withdraws from previous champions Martins Licis (sciatica) and Oleksii Novikov (bicep issues), former two-time runner up Mateusz Kieliszkowski (Achilles injury), Shane Flowers (bicep tear), and Kristján Jón Haraldsson (ACL tear).

- Oskar Ziółkowski (POL)
- Luke Stoltman (GBR)
- Eddie Williams (AUS)
- Trey Mitchell (USA)
- Tristain Hoath (CAN)
- Kevin Faires (USA)
- Spenser Remick (USA)
- Mitchell Hooper (CAN)
- Ondřej Fojtů (CZE)
- Nicolas Cambi (ITA)
- Gavin Bilton (GBR)
- Austin Andrade (MEX)
- Aivars Šmaukstelis (LAT)
- Mathew Ragg (NZL)
- Pa O'Dwyer (IRE)
- Rob Kearney (USA)
- Thomas Evans (USA)
- Adam Bishop (GBR)
- Evan Singleton (USA)
- Evans Nana Aryee (GHA)
- Pavlo Kordiyaka (UKR)
- Rauno Heinla (EST)
- Kane Francis (GBR)
- Marcus Crowder (USA)
- Jaco Schoonwinkel (RSA)
- Adam Roszkowski (POL)
- Nathan Goltry (USA)
- Wesley Derwinsky (CAN)
- Bobby Thompson (USA)
- Tom Stoltman (GBR)

== Heat results ==
=== Format ===
The 30 athletes were divided into 5 groups of 6 athletes, with 2 athletes from each group progressing to the final of 10. The winner of each group progressed to the final, and 2nd and 3rd in each group would then advance to a 'Stone Off', from which the winner would also progress.

=== Events ===
- Webster Stones: 2 stones weighing 136 kilograms (300 lb) and 113 kilograms (249 lb) for distance, one drop is allowed.
- Deadlift Ladder: 5 bars weighing 300–380 kilograms (660–840 lb). 60 second time limit.
- Sandbag Steeplechase: 3 bags weighing 120 kilograms (260 lb) each. To be taken down a 20 metres (66 ft) course with a lift over a bar at the half way point and then on to a platform. 1 minute 15 second time limit.
- Viking Press: 150 kilograms (330 lb). 60 second time limit
- Car Walk: 454 kilograms (1,001 lb). 20 metres (66 ft) course. 60 second time limit.

=== Heat 1 ===
#	Athlete	Event 1 Webster Stones	Event 2 Deadlift Ladder	Event 3 Sandbag Steepelchase	Event 4 Globe Viking Press	Event 5 Car Walk	Pts
1	(Canada) Tristain Hoath	4th - 31.38 metres (103.0 ft)	1st - 5 in 49.68s	1st - 6 in 1m 3.36s	2nd - 15 reps	2nd - 23.20s	25
2	(Australia) Eddie Williams	1st - 46.45 metres (152.4 ft)	2nd - 5 in 58.07s	3rd - 5 in 57.95s	5th - 10 reps	1st - 14.06s	21.5
3	(United Kingdom) Luke Stoltman	2nd - 33.12 metres (108.7 ft)	3rd - 4 in 30.86s	2nd - 6 in 1m 4.16s	3rd - 11 reps	3rd - 24.14s	21.5
4	(United States) Trey Mitchell	5th - 12.78 metres (41.9 ft)	5th - 4 in 49.72s	5th - 6 in 1m 13.92s	1st - 16 reps	4th - 16.77 metres (55.0 ft)	17
5	(United States) Kevin Faires	3rd - 32.59 metres (106.9 ft)	4th - 4 in 42.35s	4th - 5 in 58.33s	3rd - 11 reps	5th - 12.91 metres (42.4 ft)	14.5
6	(Poland) Oskar Ziółkowski	6th - 10.66 metres (35.0 ft)	6th - 3 in 46.35s	6th - 4 in 54.85s	5th - 10 reps	6th - 0.52 metres (1.7 ft)	5.5

Stone Off

Athlete	Nation	Stones
Luke Stoltman	United Kingdom	9
Eddie Williams	Australia	8

=== Heat 2 ===
#	Athlete	Event 1 Webster Stones	Event 2 Deadlift Ladder	Event 3 Sandbag Steepelchase	Event 4 Globe Viking Press	Event 5 Car Walk	Pts
1	(Canada) Mitchell Hooper	1st - 40.00 metres (131.23 ft)	1st - 5 in 36.54s	1st - 6 in 53.84s	2nd - 14 reps	4th - 3.3 metres (11 ft)	25.5
2	(Czech Republic) Ondřej Fojtů	1st - 40.00 metres (131.23 ft)	3rd - 4 in 32.51s	2nd - 6 in 1m 2.91s	1st - 15 reps	5th - 2.01 metres (6.6 ft)	22.5
3	(Mexico) Austin Andrade	3rd - 29.59 metres (97.1 ft)	2nd - 5 in 51.14s	3rd - 5 in 1m 5.69s	5th - 12 reps	2nd - 24.13s	20
4	(United States) Spenser Remick	4th - 27.79 metres (91.2 ft)	6th - 4 in 53.52s	4th - 5 in 1m 6.41s	3rd - 13 reps	1st - 20.87s	16.5
5	(Italy) Nicolas Cambi	6th - 14.69 metres (48.2 ft)	5th - 4 in 46.48s	6th - 0 in 1m 15.00s	3rd - 13 reps	3rd - 35.69s	10.5
6	(United Kingdom) Gavin Bilton (Note: Gavin Bilton withdrew on the start of day two of the competition due to the recommendation of the medical staff.)	5th - 25.27 metres (82.9 ft)	4th - 4 in 38.23s	5th - 3 in 34.32s	N/A	N/A	7

Stone Off

Athlete	Nation	Stones
Austin Andrade	Mexico	8
Ondřej Fojtů	Czech Republic	7

=== Heat 3 ===
#	Athlete	Event 1 Webster Stones	Event 2 Deadlift Ladder	Event 3 Sandbag Steepelchase	Event 4 Globe Viking Press	Event 5 Car Walk	Pts
1	(New Zealand) Mathew Ragg	3rd - 21.93 metres (71.9 ft)	2nd - 5 in 30.72s	1st - 6 in 1m 0.10s	3rd - 12 reps	3rd - 19.17s	23
2	(United Kingdom) Adam Bishop (Note: Adam Bishop finished in second place in the group and progressed through to the stone off however during the car walk he sustained a ruptured achilles and withdrew from the competition. The stone off was therefore between third and fourth place instead of second and third.)	1st - 35.29 metres (115.8 ft)	1st - 5 in 27.17s	2nd - 5 in 58.70s	5th - 7 reps	5th - 15.2 metres (50 ft)	20.5
3	(Latvia) Aivars Šmaukstelis	2nd - 32.56 metres (106.8 ft)	4th - 4 in 35.88s	5th - 4 in 43.85s	2nd - 14 reps	2nd - 17.07s	20
4	(United States) Thomas Evans	4th - 21.66 metres (71.1 ft)	3rd - 5 in 52.53s	6th - 3 in 35.46s	1st - 17 reps	4th - 55.58s	17
5	(United States) Rob Kearney	5th - 20.35 metres (66.8 ft)	6th - 3 in 29.20s	4th - 5 in 1m 12.10s	4th - 11 reps	1st - 12.07s	15
6	(Republic of Ireland) Pa O'Dwyer	6th - 16.65 metres (54.6 ft)	5th - 4 in 40.11s	3rd - 5 in 1m 6.62s	5th - 7 reps	N/A	8.5

Stone Off

Athlete	Nation	Stones
Aivars Šmaukstelis	Latvia	1
Thomas Evans	United States	1

=== Heat 4 ===
#	Athlete	Event 1 Webster Stones	Event 2 Deadlift Ladder	Event 3 Sandbag Steepelchase	Event 4 Globe Viking Press	Event 5 Car Walk	Pts
1	(United States) Evan Singleton	1st - 40.00 metres (131.23 ft)	2nd - 5 in 44.50s	2nd - 6 in 1m 11.10s	1st - 16 reps	N/A	22
2	(Ukraine) Pavlo Kordiyaka	4th - 25.78 metres (84.6 ft)	6th - 3 in 26.64s	1st - 6 in 57.58s	2nd - 14 reps	4th - 29.89s	18
3	(United States) Marcus Crowder	2nd - 35.92 metres (117.8 ft)	5th - 4 in 43.70s	5th - 4 in 36.65s	3rd - 12 reps	2nd - 22.23s	17.5
4	(United Kingdom) Kane Francis	5th - 21.38 metres (70.1 ft)	3rd - 4 in 26.98s	4th - 4 in 36.23s	3rd - 12 reps	3rd - 23.56s	16.5
5	(Ghana) Evans Nana Aryee	6th - 20.16 metres (66.1 ft)	4th - 4 in 31.59s	3rd - 5 in 1m 1.82s	6th - 8 reps	1st - 18.36s	15
6	(Estonia) Rauno Heinla	3rd - 27.55 metres (90.4 ft)	1st - 5 in 40.27s	6th - 4 in 59.13s	5th - 9 reps	5th - 8.75 metres (28.7 ft)	15

Stone Off

Athlete	Nation	Stones
Pavlo Kordiyaka	Ukraine	5
Marcus Crowder	United States	5

=== Heat 5 ===
#	Athlete	Event 1 Webster Stones	Event 2 Deadlift Ladder	Event 3 Sandbag Steepelchase	Event 4 Globe Viking Press	Event 5 Car Walk	Pts
1	(United Kingdom) Tom Stoltman	2nd - 29.74 metres (97.6 ft)	2nd - 5 in 46.48s	1st - 6 in 53.69s	1st - 14 reps	5th - 2.7 metres (8.9 ft)	23.5
2	(Canada) Wesley Derwinsky	3rd - 29.36 metres (96.3 ft)	1st - 5 in 45.90s	4th - 5 in 57.23s	2nd - 13 reps	2nd - 22.59s	21.5
3	(South Africa) Jaco Schoonwinkel	1st - 31.75 metres (104.2 ft)	3rd - 4 in 29.87s	2nd - 6 in 1m 8.39s	5th - 12 reps	3rd - 28.41s	21
4	(Poland) Adam Roszkowski	5th - 22.62 metres (74.2 ft)	5th - 3 in 37.35s	5th - 5 in 1m 5.76s	1st - 14 reps	1st - 22.43s	17.5
5	(United States) Nathan Goltry	4th - 24.56 metres (80.6 ft)	4th - 4 in 48.12s	3rd - 6 in 1m 14.95s	2nd - 13 reps	4th - 36.98s	16.5
6	(United States) Bobby Thompson (Note: Bobby Thompson sustained an injury in the Webster Stones and took no further part in the competition.)	6th - 20.00 metres (65.62 ft)	N/A	N/A	N/A	N/A	1

Stone Off

Athlete	Nation	Stones
Wesley Derwinsky	Canada	8
Jaco Schoonwinkel	South Africa	8

== Finals events results ==
=== Event 1: Giant's Medley ===
- Weight: 454 kilograms (1,001 lb) yoke and 330 kilograms (730 lb) frame
- Course length: 40 metres (130 ft) total. 20 metres (66 ft) each implement.
- Time limit: 60 seconds

#	Athlete	Nation	Time	Event Points	Overall Points
1	Evan Singleton	United States	30.21	10	10
2	Austin Andrade	Mexico	40.61	9	9
3	Tom Stoltman	United Kingdom	41.26	8	8
4	Wesley Derwinsky	Canada	59.20	7	7
5	Tristain Hoath	Canada	35.54 metres (116.6 ft)	6	6
6	Mitchell Hooper	Canada	34.59 metres (113.5 ft)	5	5
7	Mathew Ragg	New Zealand	28.90 metres (94.8 ft)	4	4
8	Luke Stoltman	United Kingdom	27.43 metres (90.0 ft)	3	3
9	Aivars Šmaukstelis	Latvia	21.96 metres (72.0 ft)	2	2
10	Pavlo Kordiyaka	Ukraine	20.99 metres (68.9 ft)	1	1

=== Event 2: Max Axle Press ===
- Opening weight: 170 kilograms (370 lb)

#	Athlete	Nation	Weight	Event Points	Overall Points
1	Tom Stoltman	United Kingdom	210 kilograms (460 lb)	9.5	17.5
1	Mitchell Hooper	Canada	210 kilograms (460 lb)	9.5	14.5
3	Pavlo Kordiyaka	Ukraine	200 kilograms (440 lb)	8	9
4	Evan Singleton	United States	190 kilograms (420 lb)	6	16
4	Austin Andrade	Mexico	190 kilograms (420 lb)	6	15
4	Luke Stoltman	United Kingdom	190 kilograms (420 lb)	6	9
7	Tristain Hoath	Canada	180 kilograms (400 lb)	4	10
8	Mathew Ragg	New Zealand	170 kilograms (370 lb)	3	7
9	Wesley Derwinsky	Canada	N/A	0	7
9	Aivars Šmaukstelis	Latvia	N/A	0	2

=== Event 3: Keg Toss ===
- Weight: 15 kilograms (33 lb)
- Time limit: 60 seconds per height attempt
- Notes: 3 attempts at each height

#	Athlete	Nation	Height	Event Points	Overall Points
1	Tom Stoltman (Note: Tom Stoltman, Mitchell Hooper and Wesley Derwinsky set a new world record in the 15 kilograms (33 lb) keg toss for height, breaking the previous record of 7.75 metres (25.4 ft) set by Brian Shaw at the 2021 World's Strongest Man.)	United Kingdom	7.76 metres (25.5 ft)	9	26.5
1	Mitchell Hooper	Canada	7.76 metres (25.5 ft)	9	23.5
1	Wesley Derwinsky	Canada	7.76 metres (25.5 ft)	9	16
4	Evan Singleton	United States	7.50 metres (24.6 ft)	7	23
5	Mathew Ragg	New Zealand	7.00 metres (22.97 ft)	5.5	12.5
5	Aivars Šmaukstelis	Latvia	7.00 metres (22.97 ft)	5.5	7.5
7	Austin Andrade	Mexico	6.50 metres (21.3 ft)	3.5	18.5
7	Luke Stoltman	United Kingdom	6.50 metres (21.3 ft)	3.5	12.5
9	Tristain Hoath	Canada	6.00 metres (19.69 ft)	2	12
10	Pavlo Kordiyaka	Ukraine	N/A	0	9

=== Event 4: Conan's Wheel ===
- Weight: 250 kilograms (550 lb)

#	Athlete	Nation	Degrees/ Rotations	Event Points	Overall Points
1	Pavlo Kordiyaka	Ukraine	922 °	10	19
2	Mitchell Hooper	Canada	821 °	9	32.5
3	Tom Stoltman	United Kingdom	777 °	8	34.5
4	Mathew Ragg	New Zealand	748 °	7	19.5
5	Wesley Derwinsky	Canada	681 °	6	22
6	Tristain Hoath	Canada	643 °	5	17
7	Evan Singleton	United States	598 °	4	27
8	Luke Stoltman	United Kingdom	527 °	3	15.5
9	Austin Andrade	Mexico	526 °	2	20.5
10	Aivars Šmaukstelis	Latvia	486 °	1	8.5

=== Event 5: Tire Deadlift ===
- Weight: 374 kilograms (825 lb)
- Time limit: 60 seconds

#	Athlete	Nation	Repetitions	Event Points	Overall Points
1	Mathew Ragg	New Zealand	8	10	29.5
2	Tom Stoltman	United Kingdom	7	8.5	43
2	Tristain Hoath	Canada	7	8.5	25.5
4	Mitchell Hooper	Canada	6	6	38.5
4	Wesley Derwinsky	Canada	6	6	28
4	Austin Andrade	Mexico	6	6	26.5
7	Evan Singleton	United States	5	4	31
8	Luke Stoltman	United Kingdom	4	3	18.5
9	Aivars Šmaukstelis	Latvia	3	2	10.5
10	Pavlo Kordiyaka	Ukraine	1	1	20

=== Event 6: Atlas Stones ===
- Weight: 5 stones ranging from 140–210 kilograms (310–460 lb)
- Time Limit: 60 seconds

#	Athlete	Nation	Time	Event Points	Overall Points
1	Tom Stoltman	United Kingdom	5 in 38.14	10	53
2	Mitchell Hooper	Canada	4 in 37.35	9	47.5
3	Tristain Hoath	Canada	4 in 43.79	8	33.5
4	Pavlo Kordiyaka	Ukraine	4 in 44.58	7	27
5	Mathew Ragg	New Zealand	4 in 49.93	6	35.5
6	Evan Singleton	United States	3 in 24.09	5	36
7	Austin Andrade	Mexico	3 in 24.42	4	30.5
8	Wesley Derwinsky	Canada	3 in 30.80	3	31
9	Aivars Šmaukstelis	Latvia	3 in 32.88	2	12.5
10	Luke Stoltman	United Kingdom	3 in 36.09	1	19.5

== Final standings ==
#	Athlete	Nation	Points
1st place, gold medalist(s)	Tom Stoltman	United Kingdom	53
2nd place, silver medalist(s)	Mitchell Hooper	Canada	47.5
3rd place, bronze medalist(s)	Evan Singleton	United States	36
4	Mathew Ragg	New Zealand	35.5
5	Tristain Hoath	Canada	33.5
6	Wesley Derwinsky	Canada	31
7	Austin Andrade	Mexico	30.5
8	Pavlo Kordiyaka	Ukraine	27
9	Luke Stoltman	United Kingdom	19.5
10	Aivars Šmaukstelis	Latvia	12.5

Preceded by 2023 World's Strongest Man	2024 World's Strongest Man	Succeeded by 2025 World's Strongest Man
