= Pa O'Dwyer =

Irish strongman (1985–2026)

Patrick "Pa" O'Dwyer (25 July 1985 – 3 January 2026) was an Irish strongman competitor and social media personality.

A regular entrant at the national strongman circuit, he won 2018 UK's Strongest Man competition as well as Ireland's Strongest Man competition in 2017, 2018, 2019 and 2021.

== Early life and career ==
Patrick O'Dwyer was born on 25 July 1985 in Rooskagh in County Limerick and was nicknamed 'Limerick Lion'. A construction worker early in his career, he was also a firefighter at 'Newcastle West Fire Brigade' from 2010.

In 2014, he was selected by Colin Bryce of Giants Live to represent their competitions. After his performance at Giants Live Poland and Strongman Champions League Finland, where he placed eleventh and twelfth respectively, he didn't get an opportunity again until 2017 when he was invited to Ireland's Strongest Man. His career best performance came in 2018 when he won UK's Strongest Man competition, beating Laurence Shahlaei and Phil Roberts by one point.

At international circuit, O'Dwyer was picked by Ultimate Strongman for their 2018 Summermania competition. Placing seventh, the following year he placed thirteenth at 2019 Arnold Africa. He was invited to the World's Strongest Man competition in 2020, but failed to qualify beyond group stages. In 2022, he placed second in the national circuit at Britain's Strongest Man competition. In 2023 and 2024 he was again invited to the World's Strongest Man but failed to qualify beyond group stages on both occasions. In his final competition 2025 Europe's Strongest Man, he placed eighth.

=== International strongman record ===
Winning percentage: 0%
Podium percentage: 0%

1st	2nd	3rd	Podium	4th	5th	6th	7th	8th	9th	10th	11th	12th	13th	14th	16th	23rd	26th	30th	57th	Total
0	0	0	0	1	1	2	2	5	3	4	3	3	2	2	1	1	1	1	1	33

=== Personal records ===
- Equipped Deadlift (with multi-ply suit and figure 8 straps) – 400 kg (882 lb) (2022 Giants Live World Open)
- Raw Deadlift (no suit or straps) – 315 kg (694 lb) (2013 UK's Strongest Man)
- Log press – 180 kg (397 lb) (2020 Europe's Strongest Man)
- Axle press – 170 kg (375 lb) (2021 Giants Live Strongman Classic)

== Personal life and death ==
O'Dwyer was a social media influencer focusing on areas such as satire and gym positivism. He had three children: a daughter and two sons. He died on 3 January 2026, at the age of 40.
