= Lucas Hatton =

America's strongest man in 2023

Personal information
- Born: 28 April 1995 (age 31) Eatonville, Washington
- Years active: 2022–present
- Height: 6 ft 0 in (1.83 m)
- Weight: 159–168 kg (351–370 lb)

Sport
- Sport: Strongman
Medal record
World's Strongest Man
Qualified	2025 World's Strongest Man
Qualified	2026 World's Strongest Man
Arnold Strongman Classic
2nd	2025 Arnold Strongman Classic
5th	2026 Arnold Strongman Classic
Shaw Classic
3rd	2024 Strongest Man on Earth
2nd	2025 Strongest Man on Earth
Rogue Invitational
4th	2025 Rogue Invitational
Giants Live
5th	2025 Strongman Classic
Magnús Ver Magnússon Strongman Classic
3rd	2025 MVM Strongman Classic
Arnold Pro Strongman World Series
2nd	2023 Arnold Amateur
3rd	2024 Arnold UK
Official Strongman Games
5th	2022 Official Strongman Games
North America's Strongest Man
2nd	2023 NASM
2nd	2024 NASM
America's Strongest Man
1st	2023 America's Strongest Man
1st	2024 America's Strongest Man
1st	2025 America's Strongest Man
Beerstone
5th	2022 Beerstone

Lucas Hatton (born 28 April 1995) is a professional strongman from Eatonville, Washington. He is the reigning three-times America's Strongest Man.

As a collegiate athlete for Pacific Lutheran University, Hatton played football, track and field (notably shot put, discus and hammer), weightlifting and powerlifting. In 2018 he started competing in local strongman competitions and gradually excelled into the international circuit, emerging fifth at 2022 Official Strongman Games.

== Career ==
In 2023 he emerged second at North America's Strongest Man and won America's Strongest Man. He also finished second at the Arnold Amateur.

In 2024, he was qualified for the Arnold UK where he emerged third behind Mitchell Hooper and Hafþór Júlíus Björnsson. He also won America's Strongest Man for the second time. In August, he finished third at the Strongest Man on Earth in Colarado.

In 2025, Hatton started his season finishing second at the Arnold Strongman Classic in Ohio. Hatton then competed at World's Strongest Man for the first time in May. He went out in the group stage. He improved his placing from third to second at Strongest Man on Earth, finishing just 1 point behind the winner Evan Singleton.

== Personal records ==
Strongman:

- Deadlift (Raw with straps) – 388.5 kg (856 lb) (2024 Strongest Man on Earth)
- Elephant bar Deadlift (Raw with straps) – 424.5 kg (936 lb) (2026 Arnold Strongman Classic)
- Stiff bar Deadlift (Raw with straps) – 350 kg (772 lb) x 7 reps (2024 Arnold UK)
- Trap bar Deadlift (from 12 inches) – 514.5 kg (1,134 lb) (2025 Strongest Man on Earth) (Joint-World Record)
- Log press – 222.3 kg (490 lb) (2025 Strongest Man on Earth) (American Record)
- Log press for reps – 195 kg (430 lb) x 3 reps (2024 Arnold UK)
- Log press ladder – 120–180 kg (265–397 lb) 5 logs in 37.71 secs (2025 Giants Live Strongman Classic) (World Record)
- Axle press – 200 kg (441 lb) (2023 America's Strongest Man)
- Flintstone barbell split jerk (behind the neck) – 252 kg (556 lb) (2025 World's Strongest Man, Record Breakers) (World Record)
- Circus dumbbell press – 130 kg (287 lb) (2024 Arnold UK)
- Circus dumbbell press ladder – 102–129.5 kg (225–285 lb) 5 dumbbells in 78.78 secs (2024 Strongest Man on Earth) (World Record)
- Standing keg drop chest press – 170–258.5 kg (375–570 lb) x 10 weights (2025 Strongest Man on Earth) (World Record)
- Medley – 453.5 kg (1,000 lb) yoke for 15m course into 3 circus dumbbells 110–130 kg (243–287 lb) in 131.81 seconds (2024 Arnold UK) (World Record)
- Manhood Stone (Max Atlas Stone) – 227 kg (500 lb) x 3 reps over 4 ft bar (2025 Strongest Man on Earth)
- Keg toss (for height) – 15 kg (33 lb) over 6.10 metres (20 ft 0 in) (2024 Strongest Man on Earth)
- Keg toss (for weight) – 27 kg (60 lb) over 4.57 metres (15 ft 0 in) (2025 Strongest Man on Earth)

Training:

- Deadlift (Raw with straps) – 399 kg (880 lb) x 2 reps, and 369.5 kg (815 lb) x 3 reps
- Squat (Raw with sleeves) – 363 kg (800 lb) x 3 reps, 340 kg (750 lb) x 8 reps, and 272 kg (600 lb) x 20 reps
- Barbell split jerk (behind the neck) – 272 kg (600 lb)
- Axle push press (from the rack) – 190.5 kg (420 lb) x 8 reps
- Metal Block press – 145 kg (320 lb)
- Manhood Stone (Max Atlas Stone) – 238 kg (525 lb) over 4 ft bar

== Competitive record ==
Podium percentage: 53.33%

	1st	2nd	3rd	Podium	4th	5th	6th	7th	8th	9th	10th	14th	Total
International competitions	0	5	3	8	1	4	0	0	0	0	0	1	15

== Filmography ==
=== Television ===
Year	Title	Role	Notes
2025	World's Strongest Man	Himself – Competitor	
