= Bobby Thompson (strongman) =

American strongman (born 1994)

Personal information
- Nationality: (United States) American
- Born: March 22, 1994 (age 31) Germany
- Height: 6 ft 0 1/2 in (1.84 m)
- Weight: 150 kg (331 lb)

Sport
- Sport: Strongman
- Retired: 2025

Bobby Thompson (born March 22, 1994) is a retired American strongman competitor. He held the American log lift record of 217 kg (478 lb) for four years from 2021 to 2025.

== Early life ==
Thompson was born in Germany to a military family, which led to frequent moves during his childhood. His family eventually settled in Stafford County, Virginia, where he attended Mountain View High School. As a youth, he played team sports but was plagued by chronic foot injuries that required surgical interventions, including bone fusions and screws in both feet. These injuries shifted his focus to powerlifting, which eventually led him to strongman.

== Strongman career ==
Thompson's strongman journey began in 2015 under the mentorship of Zane Angle. He competed at a local novice contest, which he won with minimal equipment-specific training.

Thompson made his professional debut at the 2019 Giants Live North American Open, finishing fourth. That same year, he won the Arnold Amateur Strongman World Championships in Columbus, Ohio, edging out Marcus Crowder by half a point. Thompson debuted at the 2020 World's Strongest Man but failed to excel to the finals.

The next year, after qualifying for the finals he placed ninth, highlighted by the joint-second-heaviest log lift of 205 kg (452 lb) and nine reps with 350 kg (772 lb) in the deadlift. In 2023 he failed to reach finals and in 2024 withdrew due to a foot injury. Thompson's notable achievements include back to back bronze medals at the 2022 and 2023 Arnold Strongman Classics, a win at the 2022 Beerstone contest, and an eighth-place finish at the 2024 Strongest Man on Earth.

Thompson's final competition was the 2025 Strongest Man on Earth, where he completed three events before withdrawing and soon announced his retirement.

== Personal records ==
During competitions:

- Elephant bar Deadlift (raw with straps) – 447.5 kg (987 lb) (2025 Arnold Strongman Classic)
- Axle bar Deadlift for incremental reps (from 15 inches) – 300–440 kg (661–970 lb) x 5 reps in 27.10 seconds (2021 World's Ultimate Strongman) (world record)
- Double T Squat (with multi-ply suit) – 429 kg (946 lb) (2022 Arnold Strongman Classic)
- Log press – 217 kg (478 lb) (2021 American Log Press Record Breakers) (former American record)
- Log press for reps – 180 kg (397 lb) x 4 reps (2021 World's Ultimate Strongman)

During training:

- Equipped Deadlift (with deadlift suit and straps) – 465 kg (1,025 lb)

== Personal life ==
Thompson resides in Stafford, Virginia, and works in logistics. He studied at Germanna Community College. He has leaned down in recent years, reducing bodyweight while maintaining strength.
