= Tom Stoltman =

World's Strongest Man 2021, 2022, 2024

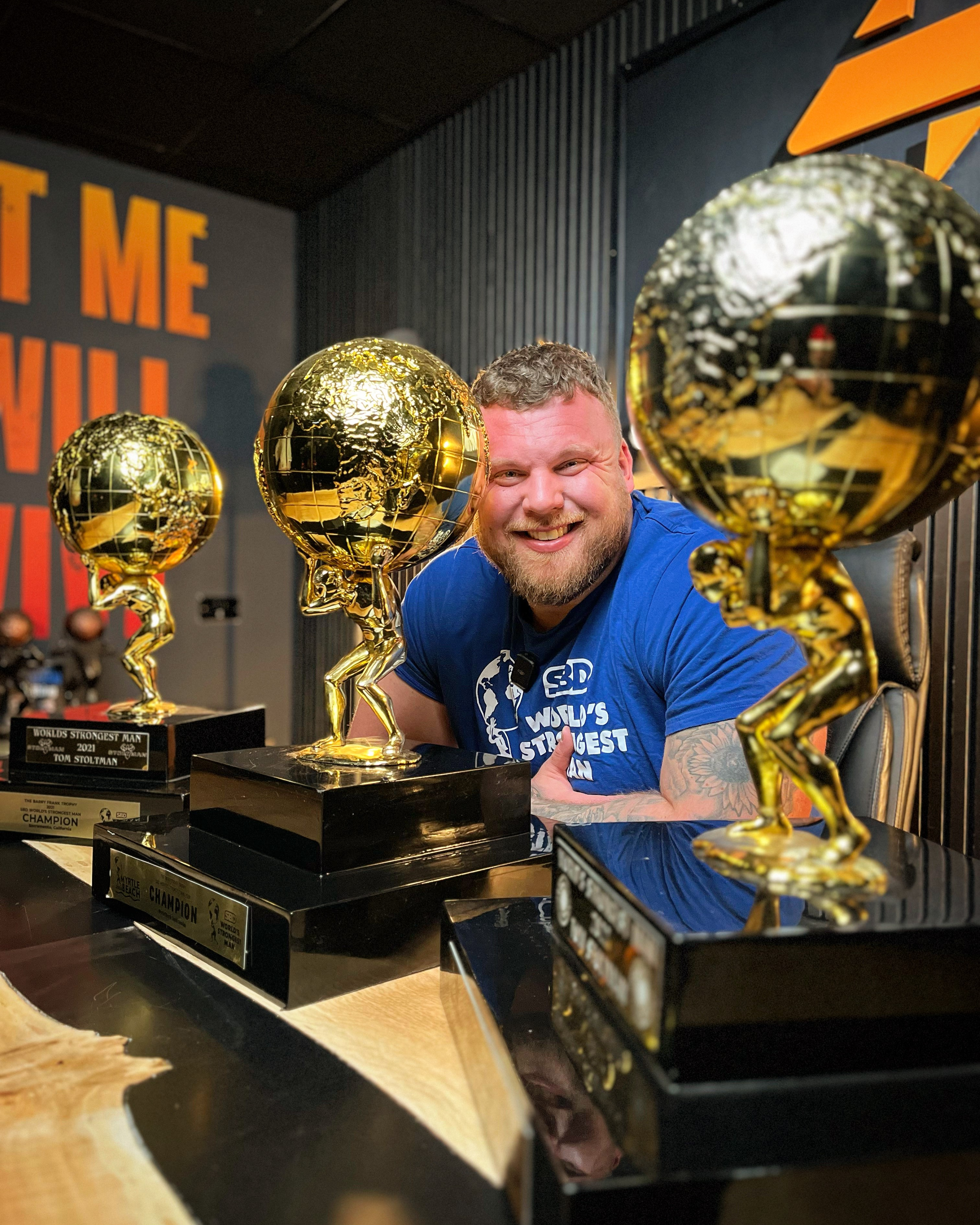
- Stoltman in 2024 with his 3 x WSM trophies

Personal information
- Nickname: The Albatross
- Born: 30 May 1994 (age 32) Invergordon, Scotland
- Education: Invergordon Academy
- Height: 6 ft 8 in (2.03 m)
- Weight: 155–183 kg (342–403 lb)
- Spouse: Sinead Tulloch (m. 2015)
- Relative: Luke Stoltman (brother)
- Website: stoltmanbrothers.com

YouTube information
- Channel: Stoltman Brothers
- Years active: 2019–present
- Genre: Strength Training/Strongman
- Subscribers: 288 thousand
- Views: 71.92 million
- Last updated: 10 July 2026

Sport
- Sport: Strongman
Medal record
Strongman
Representing United Kingdom
World's Strongest Man
Qualified	2017 World's Strongest Man
5th	2019 World's Strongest Man
2nd	2020 World's Strongest Man
1st	2021 World's Strongest Man
1st	2022 World's Strongest Man
2nd	2023 World's Strongest Man
1st	2024 World's Strongest Man
2nd	2025 World's Strongest Man
Qualified	2026 World's Strongest Man
Arnold Strongman Classic
7th	2022 Arnold Strongman Classic
6th	2023 Arnold Strongman Classic
3rd	2024 Arnold Strongman Classic
7th	2025 Arnold Strongman Classic
Rogue Invitational
2nd	2021 Rogue Invitational
2nd	2023 Rogue Invitational
2nd	2024 Rogue Invitational
3rd	2025 Rogue Invitational
Shaw Classic
3rd	2023 Strongest Man on Earth
7th	2024 Strongest Man on Earth
8th	2025 Strongest Man on Earth
World's Ultimate Strongman
8th	2018 World's Ultimate Strongman
3rd	2019 World's Ultimate Strongman
5th	2021 World's Ultimate Strongman
Europe's Strongest Man
4th	2019 Europe's Strongest Man
Giants Live
7th	2018 World Tour Finals
9th	2019 Wembley
8th	2019 World Tour Finals
5th	2021 Strongman Classic
2nd	2021 World Tour Finals
10th	2021 Arnold UK
2nd	2023 Strongman Classic
1st	2023 World Tour Finals
2nd	2024 Strongman Classic
10th	2024 US Strongman Championship
5th	2025 World Tour Finals
12th	2026 World Tour Finals
Strongman Champions League
2nd	2017 SCL Fibo Germany
Ultimate Strongman
4th	2016 Junior World Champs
4th	2016 World Championships
Representing Scotland
Britain's Strongest Man
6th	2017 Britain's Strongest Man
13th	2018 Britain's Strongest Man
3rd	2019 Britain's Strongest Man
2nd	2020 Britain's Strongest Man
1st	2021 Britain's Strongest Man
1st	2022 Britain's Strongest Man
1st	2024 Britain's Strongest Man
1st	2026 Britain's Strongest Man
UK's Strongest Man
5th	2016 UK's Strongest Man
2nd	2017 UK's Strongest Man
Scotland's Strongest Man
2nd	2015 Scotland's Strongest Man
2nd	2016 Scotland's Strongest Man
2nd	2017 Scotland's Strongest Man
1st	2018 Scotland's Strongest Man
1st	2019 Scotland's Strongest Man
Iceland's Strongest Man
2nd	2019 Iceland's Strongest Man

Tom Ryan Stoltman (born 30 May 1994) is a British strongman, from Invergordon, Scotland. He is a three time winner of the World's Strongest Man in 2021, 2022, and 2024. He also won the national title of Britain's Strongest Man in the same years, as well as in 2026. Nicknamed "The Albatross" due to his sizeable arm span, Stoltman is known for his prowess with the Atlas Stones. He holds the world records for the 5 Atlas stones (light set) 100–180 kg (220–397 lb), completing them in 16.01 seconds, and the heaviest Manhood stone at 286 kg (631 lb).

Stoltman won 2021 World's Strongest Man competition, becoming the first Scotsman and fifth Briton to win the title. He then won 2022 World's Strongest Man, becoming only the second Briton to win two titles (37 years after Geoff Capes) and the first to win back-to-back. In the 2024 World's Strongest Man he reclaimed his title, becoming the only Briton to have won three titles.

Tom Stoltman is the younger brother of the two-time Europe's Strongest Man winner Luke Stoltman, with whom he runs their YouTube channel "The Stoltman Brothers".

== Early life ==
Tom Stoltman was born in Invergordon, Ross and Cromarty to parents Ben and Sheila, ten years after his older brother and fellow strongman competitor Luke. He was diagnosed with autism at the age of 5. Tom attended Newmore Primary School and Invergordon Academy in the Scottish Highlands where he developed his passion for playing football. As a result of his performances in the school football team, Stoltman was invited to Ross County and Rangers youth set up for trials. Inspired by Luke's success as Scotland's Strongest Man, Stoltman switched his attention to weight training in the local gym at the age of 16. Within a year, he was showing such potential that Luke decided to take him under his wing and guide him through training for strongman.

== Strongman career ==
Aged 18, Stoltman entered and won his first competition, Highlands Strongest Man. This was followed by success at the Scotland's Strongest Man (SSM) qualifier where he subsequently placed 5th in the main event. In 2015 Stoltman reached the podium of SSM, finishing second only to his elder brother Luke the next three years in a row.

2017 was seen as Stoltman's breakout year: he finished second in the UK's Strongest Man competition behind reigning Europe's Strongest Man, Laurence Shahlaei, and placed 6th at Britain's Strongest Man (BSM). These performances gained him an invitation to his first World's Strongest Man, but he withdrew from the competition after the first two events in the heats. This was followed up by taking his first SSM win ahead of Luke in 2018, and an 8th-place finish at the World's Ultimate Strongman (WUS) in Dubai the same year.

Stoltman ranked 5th at the 2019 WSM and 3rd at WUS. He also won his second SSM trophy and a podium finish at BSM. In 2020 Stoltman returned to the World's Strongest Man finals in Florida, finishing in second place after a low scoring finish in the Hercules Hold. At BSM in the same year, Stoltman took 2nd place and broke the world record for the Giants Live light set of 100–180 kilograms (220–400 lb) Castle Stones in 16.01 seconds.

In 2021, Stoltman won the World's Strongest Man title in Sacramento, California. He won two of the first five events, placing him in first ahead of four-time winner Brian Shaw going into the final event. The win was sealed with Stoltman completing the Atlas Stone (140–210 kilograms (310–460 lb)) run in 20.21 seconds, taking the event win and overall title to Scotland for the first time in the competition's history. Stoltman also won Britain's Strongest Man in 2021, the same year in which his brother Luke won Europe's Strongest Man. Stoltman ended his season coming 2nd place at the Rogue Invitational.

In 2022, Stoltman successfully defended his BSM title at the Utilita Arena in Sheffield, England. He then competed at the Arnold Strongman Classic for the first time and placed 7th. At World's Strongest Man, Stoltman took first in his heat, winning the first 4 events. In the final, Stoltman faced three former winners: four-time winner Shaw, 2019 winner Martins Licis, and 2020 winner Oleksiy Novikov. Stoltman won by a margin of 10.5 points, becoming only the second Briton to win two titles, 37 years after Geoff Capes and the first ever to win back-to-back titles.

After a brief period away from competing, in 2023, Stoltman came 6th at the Arnold Strongman Classic. He then came in 2nd place at the World's Strongest Man, behind champion Mitchell Hooper. He followed this up by beating Hooper at their next competition, Giants Live Strongman Classic at the Royal Albert Hall though was pipped to first place by 0.5 points. At the Shaw Classic, Stoltman had a slow start, picking up 0 points on the first event, but went on to win 3 of the 4 events on day 2, more event wins than any other competitor, and reach the podium. During the show, Tom won the Hummer Deadlift event where he pulled 499 kilograms (1,100 lb). Stoltman rounded off his 2023 season winning the World Tour Finals in his native country at Glasgow and finishing 2nd at the Rogue Invitational.

In 2024, Stoltman started his season by winning Britain's Strongest Man for the 3rd time. He then finished 3rd at the Arnold Strongman Classic continuing his podium streak. He also regained the title of Worlds Strongest Man from Mitchell Hooper, making it his 3rd Worlds Strongest Man title and 5th podium appearance. Stoltman finished 2nd at the Strongman Classic at the Royal Albert Hall in July. He then finished 7th at the Strongest Man on Earth in Colorado. Due to injuries Stoltman had to pull out of the US Strongman Championships in Las Vegas mid competition. He finished the year placing 2nd at the Rogue Invitational in Aberdeen.

In 2025, Stoltman began his season finishing 7th at the Arnold Strongman Classic in Ohio. In May, Stoltman finished 2nd at the World's Strongest Man in Sacramento, missing out on the title by half a point. He then finished 5th at the World Tour Finals and 3rd at the Rogue Invitational both in Scotland.

In February 2026, Stoltman won his fourth Britain's Strongest Man title. After injuring his hand on the first event, Stoltman went out in the qualifying heats of the 2026 World's Strongest Man competition in Carolina.

== Personal life ==
Stoltman is one of five siblings, all of whom live in and around their hometown of Invergordon close to their father, Ben. Stoltman's youngest brother Harry works for the Stoltman Brothers' business and is currently training to compete in strongman competition. Stoltman married wife Sinead in 2015 and is a supporter of Rangers.

Stoltman's mother Sheila died aged 56 in 2016. Stoltman and his brother Luke regularly cite their mother's influence as key to inspiring them to succeed in their careers.

In 2021, a permanent tribute to Stoltman and brother Luke was installed by Invergordon Community Council in their hometown, where the signs at the entrances to Invergordon were updated to include their names and achievements. The sign reads "Welcome to Invergordon. Hometown of the Stoltman Brothers. World, European and UK Strongest Men".

== Other ventures ==
=== Gym ===
In 2018, alongside brother Luke, Stoltman opened a commercial gym, The Stoltman Strength Centre, in Invergordon. This was originally a joint venture with another party though is now fully owned by the Stoltman Brothers Ltd. The brothers use the facility for the majority of their training, having originally trained in Luke's home gym in his garage. In 2023 the brothers announced a partnership with Glasgow based commercial strength equipment brand Primal. As part of the deal, the Stoltman Strength Centre received an upgrade and redesign.

=== Health and fitness brand ===
The brothers sell Stoltman Brothers branded merchandise via an online shop. Original offerings were primarily focused around images of the brothers; however this has now been built up to include more everyday lifestyle clothing with Stoltman branding, 'motivational' apparel featuring some of the company/brothers' values and quotes. All clothing is sold via the Stoltman brothers website and their shop which they opened in Invergordon in 2022.

=== Stoltman Strength Academy ===
The Stoltman brothers in 2022 set up their own strength training academy.

=== Media ===
Together with brother Luke, Stoltman has a YouTube channel through which they show training and competition footage, partake in various challenges, and provide an insight to everyday life for professional strongmen athletes.

=== Publications and other media ===
The brothers released an autobiographical book, Lifting: Becoming the World's Strongest Brothers, in 2023.

Luke and Tom both feature and narrate in Coach Mike Chadwick's The Red On Revolution book, published in 2022.

Stoltman will join the cast of the BBC show, Gladiators. The fourth series will film in Sheffield in August 2026, and will be on BBC One in 2027. His Gladiator name is Highlander.

== Personal records ==
In competitions
Strongman:

- Equipped Deadlift – 430 kg (948 lb) (with suit and straps) (2019 World's Ultimate Strongman)
- Standard bar Raw Deadlift – 408.5 kg (901 lb) (without suit and with straps) (2024 Strongest Man on Earth)
- Elephant bar Raw Deadlift – 415.5 kg (916 lb) (without suit and with straps) (2024 Arnold Strongman Classic)
- Equipped Deadlift for reps – 400 kg (882 lb) x 5 reps (with suit and straps) (2024 Britain's Strongest man)
- Hummer tyre Deadlift (15 in off the floor) – 499 kg (1,100 lb) (2023 Shaw Classic)
- Double T Squat (with multi-ply suit) – 391 kg (862 lb) (2022 Arnold Strongman Classic)
- Giant barbell Squat (for reps) – 340 kg (750 lb) × 5 reps (single-ply suit w/ wraps) (2019 World's Strongest Man)
- Log press – 210 kg (463 lb) (2023 World Tour Finals)
- Log press for reps – 163 kg (359 lb) x 10 reps in 90 seconds (2023 Rogue Invitational) (World Record)
- Axle press – 210 kg (463 lb) (2024 World's Strongest Man)
- Flintstone barbell push press (behind the neck) – 240 kg (529 lb) (2022 World's Strongest Man) (former-joint world record)
- Monster Dumbbell Press - 132 kg (291 lb) (2023 World's Strongest Man) (British Record)
- Keg toss – 15 kg (33 lb) over 7.76 m (25 ft 5 1/2 in) (2024 World's Strongest Man) (former joint-world record)
- Manhood Stone (Max Atlas Stone) – 286 kg (631 lb) (2020 World's Ultimate Strongman, Feats of Strength series) (World Record) Tom has also broken this world record 2 times before, with 256.5 kg (565 lb) and 273 kg (602 lb) at 2020 Rogue record breakers event held during the Arnold Strongman Classic
- 5 Atlas Stones run (heavy set) – 120–200 kg (265–441 lb) 20.69 seconds (2019 Giants Live Wembley)
- 5 Atlas Stones run (light set) – 100–180 kg (220–397 lb) 16.01 seconds (2020 Britain's Strongest man) (World Record)
- 10 Atlas Stones run – 100–200 kg (220–441 lb) 40.70 seconds (2019 World's Ultimate Strongman) (World Record)
- Ardblair Stones – 9 stones ranging from 18–152 kg (40–335 lb) loaded onto 4 ft 4 in (52 in) whiskey barrels in 21.81 seconds (2019 Blairgowrie & Rattray Highland Games) (World Record)
- Inver Stones (hitching post setup) – 5 Stones weighing 125–191 kg (276–421 lb) in 29.16 seconds (2021 Rogue Invitational)
- Inver Stone press – 136 kg (300 lb) (2024 Arnold Strongman Classic) (Joint-World Record)
- Shield carry – 200 kg (441 lb) 65.3 m (214 ft) (2022 Britain's Strongest Man) (former world record)
- Titan's turntable – 29,937 kg (66,000 lb) in a 30m course in 46.89 seconds (2021 World's Strongest Man) (World Record)
- Medley – 440 kg (970 lb) yoke for 10m course into 350 kg (772 lb) frame carry for 15m course in 18.36 seconds (2021 World's Strongest Man) (World Record)

Powerlifting:

- Squat (Raw with wraps) – 325 kg (717 lb) (2017 GPC Savage Pro, England)
- Bench Press (Raw) – 220 kg (485 lb) (2017 GPC Savage Pro, England)
- Deadlift (Raw) – 360 kg (794 lb) (2017 GPC Savage Pro, England)
- Total – 905 kg (1,995 lb) (2017 GPC Savage Pro, England)

In training

- Deadlift – 420 kg (926 lb) × 2
- Axle Deadlift – 400 kg (882 lb)
- Log Press – 215 kg (474 lb)
- Squat – 345 kg (761 lb)

== Competitive record ==
Winning percentage: 10.26%
Podium percentage: 46.15%

	1st	2nd	3rd	Podium	4th	5th	6th	7th	8th	9th	10th	12th	22nd	Total
International competitions	4	10	4	18	3	3	1	4	3	1	2	1	1	39

== Filmography ==
=== Television ===
Year	Title	Role	Notes
2017, 2019–2026	World's Strongest Man	Himself – Competitor	3x Champion
2025	The Traitors	Masked Bodyguard	Series 3, Episode 6
2025	Blue Peter	Guest	
2026	Battle of the Beasts	Himself – Competitor	
2026	Gladiators	Himself – Competitor	Series 4
