= 2022 Arnold Strongman Classic =

Arnold Strongman Classic event of 2022

Competition information
- Dates: 4–5 March 2022
- Venue: Greater Columbus Convention Center
- Location: Ohio, Columbus
- Country: United States
- Athletes participating: 10
- Nations participating: 5

Champion(s)
- (United States) Martins Licis

The 2022 Arnold Strongman Classic was a strongman contest that took place in Columbus, Ohio from 4–5 March 2022 at the Greater Columbus Convention Center. The Arnold Strongman Classic is seen as one of the biggest and most prestigious strongmen events on the circuit. This year marked the return of the competition after the 2021 edition was canceled due to the COVID-19 pandemic.

Martins Licis won the competition for the first time, becoming only the fourth man to win the Arnold Strongman Classic and the World's Strongest Man competitions after Zydrunas Savickas, Brian Shaw and Hafþór Júlíus Björnsson, with Oleksii Novikov finishing in second place, and Bobby Thompson and Luke Stoltman finishing joint third place.

== Qualifying ==
Due to the COVID-19 pandemic preventing any qualifying event from the Arnold Strongman Tour in 2020 and 2021, this edition had an invitational system where athletes were invited based on past achievements in the sport. Athletes that qualified and their method for qualification are as follows:

Name	Nationality	Method of Qualification
Maxime Boudreault	Canada	2021 Magnús Ver Magnússon Strongman Classic Champion
JF Caron	Canada	3rd Place, 2021 Shaw Classic; 3rd Place, 2020 World's Strongest Man; 2018 & 2019 Canada's Strongest Man
Rob Kearney	United States	6th Place, 2021 Rogue Invitational; 2019 Arnold Strongman Australia Champion
Mateusz Kieliszkowski (withdrew)	Poland	4th Place, 2021 Rogue Invitational; 2nd Place, 2018 & 2019 World's Strongest Man
Martins Licis	United States	2021 Rogue Invitational Champion; 2019 World's Strongest Man; 3rd Place, 2020 Arnold Strongman Classic; 2nd Place, 2019 Arnold Strongman Classic
Evgeny Markov	Russia	2020 Arnold Amateur Strongman World Champion
Trey Mitchell	United States	2021 Shaw Classic Champion; 4th Place, 2021 World's Strongest Man
Oleksii Novikov	Ukraine	2020 World's Strongest Man; 3rd Place, 2021 Rogue Invitational
Luke Stoltman	United Kingdom	2021 Europe's Strongest Man
Tom Stoltman	United Kingdom	2021 World's Strongest Man; 2nd Place, 2021 Rogue Invitational
Bobby Thompson (Reserve)	United States	2019 Arnold Amateur Strongman World Champion

== Event results ==
=== Event 1: Double T Squat ===
- Notes: 3 lifts per athlete, weights to be submitted before each round.
- Special Note: Double T stands for Terry Todd, whom the event is named in honour of.

#	Athlete	Nation	Weight	Event Points	Overall Points
1	JF Caron	Canada	438 kilograms (966 lb)	10	10
2	Rob Kearney	United States	436 kilograms (961 lb)	9	9
3	Martins Licis	United States	433.5 kilograms (956 lb)	8	8
4	Bobby Thompson	United States	429 kilograms (946 lb)	7	7
5	Oleksii Novikov	Ukraine	411 kilograms (906 lb)	6	6
6	Maxime Boudreault	Canada	390.5 kilograms (861 lb)	4.5	4.5
6	Tom Stoltman	United Kingdom	390.5 kilograms (861 lb)	4.5	4.5
8	Trey Mitchell	United States	388.5 kilograms (856 lb)	3	3
9	Evgeny Markov	Russia	372.5 kilograms (821 lb)	2	2
10	Luke Stoltman	United Kingdom	370 kilograms (816 lb)	1	1

=== Event 2: Monster Dumbell Press ===
- Weight: 125 kilograms (276 lb) for max repetitions.
- Time Limit: 90 seconds

#	Athlete	Nation	Repetitions	Event Points	Overall Points
1	Oleksii Novikov	Ukraine	7	10	16
2	Rob Kearney	United States	4	9	18
3	Martins Licis	United States	3	7	15
3	Evgeny Markov	Russia	3	7	9
3	Luke Stoltman	United Kingdom	3	7	8
6	Maxime Boudreault	Canada	1	5	9.5
7	JF Caron	Canada	0	2.5	12.5
7	Bobby Thompson	United States	0	2.5	9.5
7	Tom Stoltman	United Kingdom	0	2.5	7
7	Trey Mitchell	United States	0	2.5	5.5

=== Event 3: Austrian Oak ===
- Notes: 3 lifts per athlete, weights to be submitted before each round.

#	Athlete	Nation	Weight	Event Points	Overall Points
1	Luke Stoltman	United Kingdom	213 kilograms (470 lb)	10	18
2	Trey Mitchell	United States	208.5 kilograms (460 lb)	9	14.5
3	Bobby Thompson	United States	204 kilograms (450 lb)	8	17.5
4	Martins Licis	United States	199.5 kilograms (440 lb)	7	22
5	Oleksii Novikov	Ukraine	190.5 kilograms (420 lb)	4.5	20.5
5	Rob Kearney	United States	190.5 kilograms (420 lb)	4.5	22.5
5	Maxime Boudreault	Canada	190.5 kilograms (420 lb)	4.5	14
5	Tom Stoltman	United Kingdom	190.5 kilograms (420 lb)	4.5	11.5
9	Evgeny Markov	Russia	181.5 kilograms (400 lb)	1.5	10.5
9	JF Caron (Note: JF Caron sustained an injury in this event and took no further part in the competition.)	Canada	181.5 kilograms (400 lb)	1.5	14

=== Event 4: Timber Carry ===
- Weight: 400 kilograms (880 lb)
- Course Length: 10.7 metres (35 ft) ramp
- Time Limit: 30 seconds
- Notes: No straps are allowed. Fastest time wins, then distance.

#	Athlete	Nation	Time	Event Points	Overall Points
1	Maxime Boudreault	Canada	8.41	10	24
2	Martins Licis	United States	10.03	9	31
3	Oleksii Novikov	Ukraine	9.40 metres (30.8 ft)	8	28.5
4	Tom Stoltman	United Kingdom	7.98 metres (26.2 ft)	7	18.5
5	Luke Stoltman	United Kingdom	6.53 metres (21.4 ft)	6	24
6	Bobby Thompson	United States	5.77 metres (18.9 ft)	5	22.5
7	Evgeny Markov	Russia	4.29 metres (14.1 ft)	4	14.5
8	Rob Kearney	United States	2.62 metres (8 ft 7 in)	3	25.5
9	Trey Mitchell	United States	0.03 metres (1.2 in)	2	16.5

=== Event 5: Stone to Shoulder ===
- Weight: 186 kilograms (410 lb) for max repetitions.
- Time Limit: 2 minutes 30 seconds.
- Notes: Athletes were awarded points for getting the stone to their lap or torso but not completing the full repetition.

#	Athlete	Nation	Repetitions	Event Points	Overall Points
1	Martins Licis	United States	2	10	41
2	Oleksii Novikov	Ukraine	1 (1 torso)	9	37.5
3	Bobby Thompson	United States	1	8	30.5
4	Luke Stoltman	United Kingdom	0 (2 torso)	6.5	30.5
4	Evgeny Markov	Russia	0 (2 torso)	6.5	21
6	Trey Mitchell	United States	0 (1 torso)	5	21.5
7	Maxime Boudreault	Canada	0	3	27
7	Tom Stoltman	United Kingdom	0	3	21.5
7	Rob Kearney	United States	0	3	28.5

== Final standings ==
#	Athlete	Nation	Points
1st place, gold medalist(s)	Martins Licis	United States	41
2nd place, silver medalist(s)	Oleksii Novikov	Ukraine	37.5
3rd place, bronze medalist(s)	Bobby Thompson	United States	30.5
3rd place, bronze medalist(s)	Luke Stoltman	United Kingdom	30.5
5	Rob Kearney	United States	28.5
6	Maxime Boudreault	Canada	27
7	Trey Mitchell	United States	21.5
7	Tom Stoltman	United Kingdom	21.5
9	Evgeny Markov	Russia	21
10	JF Caron	Canada	14

Preceded by 2020 Arnold Strongman Classic (2021 Arnold Strongman Classic not held)	Arnold Strongman Classic	Succeeded by 2023 Arnold Strongman Classic
