= 2019 Giants Live Wembley =

British strongman competition

Competition information
- Dates: 6 July 2019
- Venue: Wembley Arena
- Location: London
- Country: United Kingdom
- Athletes participating: 10
- Nations participating: 7

Champion(s)
- (Poland) Mateusz Kieliszkowski

The 2019 Giants Live Wembley was a strongman competition that took place in London, England on July 6, 2019 at the Wembley Arena. This event was part of the 2019 Giants Live tour.

== Participants ==
- Jerry Pritchett (United States)
- Rauno Heinla (Estonia)
- Rob Kearney (United States)
- Adam Bishop (United Kingdom)
- Martins Licis (United States)
- Mikhail Shivlyakov (Russia)
- Mark Felix (United Kingdom)
- Mateusz Kieliszkowski (Poland)
- Tom Stoltman (United Kingdom)
- Luke Stoltman (United Kingdom)

== Results of events ==
=== Event 1: Max deadlift ===
- Starting weight was 400 kilograms (880 lb).

#	Name	Nationality	Weight Lifted	Event Pts	Overall Pts
1	Jerry Pritchett	United States	455	9.5	9.5
1	Rauno Heinla	Estonia	455	9.5	9.5
3	Rob Kearney	United States	440	7.5	12
3	Adam Bishop	United Kingdom	440	7.5	7.5
5	Martins Licis	United States	420	5	5
5	Mikhail Shivlyakov	Russia	420	5	5
5	Mark Felix	Great Britain	420	5	5
8	Mateusz Kieliszkowski	Poland	400	2.5	2.5
8	Tom Stoltman	United Kingdom	400	2.5	2.5
10	Luke Stoltman	United Kingdom	N/A	0	0

=== Event 2: Farmer's Walk ===
- 160 kilograms (350 lb) over a 40 metres (130 ft) course.

#	Name	Nationality	Time	Event Pts	Overall Pts
1	Mateusz Kieliszkowski	Poland	0m 18.78	10	12.5
2	Mikhail Shivlyakov	Russia	0m 24.75	9	14
3	Jerry Pritchett	United States	0m 25.33	8	17.5
4	Luke Stoltman	United Kingdom	0m 26.20	7	7
5	Mark Felix	Great Britain	0m 29.12	6	11
6	Tom Stoltman	United Kingdom	0m 29.71	5	9
7	Martins Licis	United States	0m 32.38	4	7.5
8	Adam Bishop	United Kingdom	0m 51.96	3	10.5
9	Rob Kearney	United States	0m 51.98	2	9.5
10	Rauno Heinla	Estonia	DNF 1 metre (3 ft 3 in)	1	10.5

=== Event 3: Overhead safe press ===
- 150 kilograms (330 lb) safe press for as many repetitions as possible.

#	Name	Nationality	Repetitions	Event Pts	Overall Pts
1	Mateusz Kieliszkowski	Poland	13	10	22.5
2	Luke Stoltman	United Kingdom	12	9	16
3	Rauno Heinla	Estonia	9	8	18.5
4	Rob Kearney	United States	8	7	16.5
5	Mikhail Shivlyakov	Russia	6	5.5	19.5
5	Adam Bishop	United Kingdom	6	5.5	16
7	Tom Stoltman	United Kingdom	5	4	11.5
8	Jerry Pritchett	United States	4	3	20.5
9	Martins Licis	United States	3	2	11
10	Mark Felix	Great Britain	0	0	11

=== Event 4: Hercules Hold ===
- Athlete must stand between and hold on to 160 kilograms (350 lb) pillars for as long as possible.

#	Name	Nationality	Time	Event Pts	Overall Pts
1	Mark Felix	Great Britain	1m 23.80	10	21
2	Martins Licis	United States	0m 50.94	9	20
3	Mateusz Kieliszkowski	Poland	0m 49.64	8	30.5
4	Jerry Pritchett	United States	0m 49.08	7	27.5
5	Luke Stoltman	United Kingdom	0m 46.49	6	22
6	Rob Kearney	United States	0m 39.75	5	21.5
7	Mikhail Shivlyakov	Russia	0m 39.18	4	23.5
8	Adam Bishop	United Kingdom	0m 38.20	3	19
9	Tom Stoltman	United Kingdom	0m 34.87	2	13.5
10	Rauno Heinla	Estonia	0m 33.94	1	19.5

=== Event 5: Atlas Stones ===
- 5 Atlas Stone series ranging from 120–200 kilograms (260–440 lb).

#	Name	Nationality	Time	Event Pts	Overall Pts
1	Martins Licis	United States	5 in 0m 20.37	10	30
2	Tom Stoltman	United Kingdom	5 in 0m 20.69	9	22.5
3	Mateusz Kieliszkowski	Poland	5 in 0m 27.43	8	38.5
4	Luke Stoltman	United Kingdom	5 in 0m 27.54	7	29
5	Adam Bishop	United Kingdom	5 in 0m 30.51	6	25
6	Rob Kearney	United States	5 in 0m 34.48	5	26.5
7	Jerry Pritchett	United States	5 in 0m 46.38	4	31.5
8	Mikhail Shivlyakov	Russia	5 in 0m 47.18	3	26.5
9	Mark Felix	Great Britain	4 in 0m 24.86	2	23
10	Rauno Heinla	Estonia	4 in 0m 26.68	1	20.5

== Final results ==
#	Name	Nationality	Pts
1	Mateusz Kieliszkowski	Poland	38.5
2	Jerry Pritchett	United States	31.5
3	Martins Licis	United States	30
4	Luke Stoltman	United Kingdom	29
5	Rob Kearney	United States	26.5
5	Mikhail Shivlyakov	Russia	26.5
7	Adam Bishop	United Kingdom	25
8	Mark Felix	Great Britain	23
9	Tom Stoltman	United Kingdom	22.5
10	Rauno Heinla	Estonia	20.5
