= Jean-François Caron (strongman) =

Canadian strength athlete (born 1982)

Personal information
- Nickname: JF
- Born: June 29, 1982 (age 44) Les Hauteurs, Quebec, Canada
- Height: 6 ft 2 in (1.88 m)
- Weight: 155 kg (342 lb)

Sport
- Sport: Strongman
Medal record
Strongman
Representing Canada
World's Strongest Man
Qualified	2008 World's Strongest Man
Qualified	2011 World's Strongest Man
8th	2012 World's Strongest Man
11th	2014 World's Strongest Man
6th	2015 World's Strongest Man
5th	2016 World's Strongest Man
5th	2017 World's Strongest Man
5th	2018 World's Strongest Man
4th	2019 World's Strongest Man
3rd	2020 World's Strongest Man
5th	2021 World's Strongest Man
Arnold Strongman Classic
5th	2018 Arnold Strongman Classic
10th	2019 Arnold Strongman Classic
4th	2020 Arnold Strongman Classic
10th	2022 Arnold Strongman Classic
World's Ultimate Strongman
4th	2018 World's Ultimate Strongman
7th	2019 World's Ultimate Strongman
2nd	2020 World's Ultimate Strongman
4th	2021 World's Ultimate Strongman
Shaw Classic
2nd	2020 Shaw Classic
3rd	2021 Shaw Classic
Rogue Invitational
5th	2021 Rogue Invitational
World's Strongest Viking
3rd	2015 World's Strongest Viking
1st	2016 World's Strongest Viking
1st	2017 World's Strongest Viking
Arnold Pro Strongman World Series
2nd	2015 Forts de Warwick
1st	2016 Forts de Warwick
3rd	2017 Australia
4th	2017 Africa
2nd	2017 Forts de Warwick
2nd	2018 Australia
1st	2018 Africa
3rd	2018 Forts de Warwick
5th	2018 Europe
8th	2019 USA
1st	2019 Forts de Warwick
3rd	2019 Europe
5th	2020 USA
Giants Live
3rd	2017 World Tour Finals
3rd	2021 Arnold UK
Strongman Champions League
2nd	2011 Canada SCL Semi-finals
2nd	2011 Latvia
2nd	2012: Sarajevo SCL Finals
4th	2011/2012 Overall
4th	2012 SCL China
6th	2012 Savickas Classic
4th	2013 SCL Lapland
3rd	2013 China SCL China World Cup
6th	2014 SCL Finland
8th	2014 SCL Estonia
4th	2014 SCL World Finals
3rd	2015 SCL Norway
3rd	2015 SCL Fibo
4th	2015 SCL Holland
1st	2015 SCL Portugal
2nd	2015 SCL Martinique
4th	2015 SCL World Finals
1st	2016 SCL Norway
4th	2016 SCL Fibo
5th	2016 SCL Holland
4th	2016 SCL World Finals
1st	2017 SCL Norway
1st	2017 SCL Canada
6th	2017 SCL Truck Pull
2nd	2017 SCL World Finals
Forca Brute
1st	2022 Forca Brute
North America's Strongest Man
5th	2007 NASM
2nd	2009 NASM
2nd	2010 NASM
2nd	2011 NASM
1st	2012 NASM
1st	2013 NASM
2nd	2014 NASM
Canada's Strongest Man
2nd	2008 CSM
3rd	2009 CSM
2nd	2010 CSM
1st	2011 CSM
1st	2012 CSM
1st	2013 CSM
1st	2014 CSM
1st	2015 CSM
1st	2016 CSM
1st	2017 CSM
1st	2018 CSM
1st	2019 CSM

Jean-François 'JF' Caron (born June 29, 1982) is a French-Canadian strongman and powerlifter from Les Hauteurs, Quebec, Canada.

Having competed in 73 International strongman competitions and winning 10 of them including the World's Strongest Viking twice, Caron is among the most decorated strongmen of all-time.

== Strength Sports ==
=== Powerlifting ===
Caron held the world record in the deadlift for WPA Powerlifting organization. He pulled 385.5 kg (850 lb) raw on March 14, 2010, at the CPA Provincial Championships in Sherbrooke, Quebec in the 140 kg (309 lb) weight class, weighing in at only 127 kg (280 lb).

=== World's Strongest Man ===
Caron has competed eleven times in the World's Strongest Man contest: in 2008, 2011, 2012, 2014, 2015, 2016, 2017, 2018, 2019, 2020 and 2021. Out of them, he reached the final nine times: in 2012 and then each year between 2014 and 2021. Caron's record in the finals has progressively improved over time: he placed 8th in 2012, 6th in 2015, 5th each year between 2016 and 2018, 4th in 2019 and 3rd in 2020 - his best finish. In the 2021 competition, Caron returned to 5th place, having torn his hamstring during the first event.

=== Canada's Strongest Man ===
Caron won Canada's Strongest Man a record nine consecutive times, from 2011 to 2019. In 2016, he won all eight events in the contest, the only time a competitor has managed a clean sweep at the Canada's Strongest Man competition.

=== Other major strongman competitions ===
In 2011, Caron finished in 2nd place at the Strongman Champions League events in Canada and Latvia. Caron finished 2nd again at the 2011 SCL Finals in Sarajevo, Bosnia on Feb. 7, 2012, and 4th overall for the 2011/2012 SCL season.

In 2012 and 2013, Caron won North America's Strongest Man after coming in 2nd place the two previous years.

In 2020, Caron placed 2nd in the inaugural Shaw Classic. At that event, Caron set a new world record at the time in the Hummer Tire Deadlift, lifting 1,202 lb (545.2 kg). He also came in 4th at the 2020 Arnold Strongman Classic.

In 2021, Caron placed in 2nd in the 2020 World's Ultimate Strongman (also known as the 2021 WUS Strength Island) held in Riffa, Bahrain. Later that year, Caron placed 3rd in the 2021 Shaw Classic and 5th at the 2021 Rogue Invitational.

In 2022, while competing at the 2022 Arnold Classic, Caron suffered two torn patellar tendons and an injured ankle during the Austrian Oak Log Press. After the injury, Caron announced in an interview with Laurence Shahlaei that he is likely fully retired from professional strongman, given the severity of the injuries he suffered.

=== Refereeing ===
Upon his retirement, Caron became a strongman referee and has been refereeing international competitions such as Siberian Power Show and Shaw Classic in addition to organizing and refereeing Canadian national competitions.

== Personal records ==
- Elephant bar Deadlift (Raw with straps) – 463 kg (1,021 lb) (2018 Arnold Strongman Classic)
- Silver Dollar Deadlift (at 18 inches) (with suit and straps) – 520 kg (1,146 lb) (2018 World's Ultimate Strongman)
- Hummer tyre Deadlift (at 15 inches) (with straps) – 545 kg (1,202 lb) (2020 Shaw Classic) (former world record)
- Double T Squat (with suit) – 438 kg (966 lb) (2022 Arnold Strongman Classic) (World Record)
- Giant Barbell Squat (for reps) – 340 kg (750 lb) × 7 reps (single-ply suit w/ wraps) (2019 World's Strongest Man)
- Giant Barbell Squat (for reps) – 317.5 kg (700 lb) x 13 reps (single-ply suit w/ wraps) (2017 World's Strongest Man)
- Log press – 195 kg (430 lb) (2021 World's Strongest Man)
- Log press (for reps) – 145 kg (320 lb) x 8 reps (2017 Canada's Strongest Man)
- Max Atlas stone – 220 kg (485 lb) as a part of a 5 stone run (2017 Arnold Australia)
- Inver Stones – 5 Stones weighing 125–191 kg (276–421 lb) in 42.45 seconds (2021 Rogue Invitational)
- Inver Stone press – 136 kg (300 lb) (2020 Arnold Strongman Classic) (Joint-World Record)
- Hercules hold – 317.5 kg (700 lb) – 52.67 seconds (2020 World's Strongest Man)
- Hercules hold – 150 kg (331 lb) in each hand – 60.08 seconds (2015 World's Strongest Viking)
- Keg toss – 10 kegs 17–26 kg (37–57 lb) over 5.00 metres (16 ft 5 in) in 80.01 seconds (2022 Força Bruta)
- Sandbag over bar – 34 kg (75 lb) over 4.57 metres (15 ft 0 in) [has achieved this feat twice] (2018 and 2020 Arnold Strongman Classic)
- Loading race – 2 x 120kg Kegs & 2 x 125kg Sacks in a 12m course - 36.87 seconds (2012 World's Strongest Man Group 1) (former world record)
- Tyre flip – 650 kg (1,433 lb) x 4 flips (2016 Arnold Strongman Classic, Rogue Record Breakers) (World Record)
- Car flip – 500 kg (1,102 lb) Volkswagen x 13 flips (2018 Guinness world records, China) (World Record)
- Truck pull – 18,144 kg (40,001 lb) for 24 meter course 'uphill' in 42.44 seconds (2019 Canada's Strongest Man) (World Record)
- Truck pull – 31,752 kg (70,001 lb) 'uphill' for 15.96 meters (2017 Festival des Hommes Forts de Warwick)

== Competitive record ==
Winning percentage: 13.70%
Podium percentage: 47.94%

	1st	2nd	3rd	Podium	4th	5th	6th	7th	8th	9th	10th	11th	20th	27th	Total
International competitions	10	14	11	35	9	10	3	1	3	0	3	1	1	1	73

== Filmography ==
=== Television ===
Year	Title	Role	Notes
2008, 2011-2012, 2014-2021	World's Strongest Man	Himself – Competitor	
