= Rob Kearney (strongman) =

American professional strongman

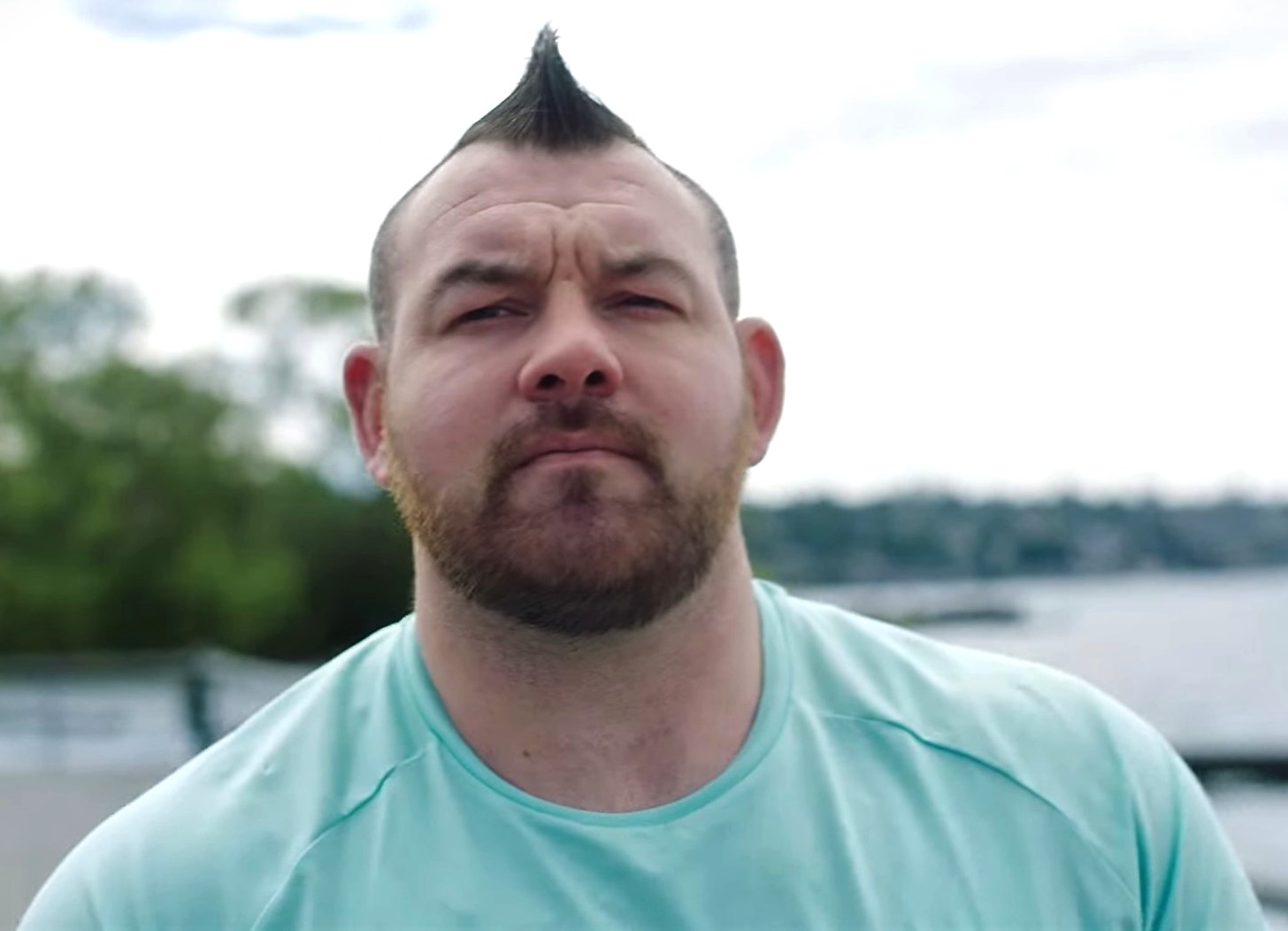
- Kearney in 2022

Personal information
- Nickname: World's Strongest Gay
- Born: November 16, 1991 (age 34)
- Height: 5 ft 10 in (1.78 m)
- Spouse: Joey Aleixo (2019-present)
- Website: https://www.robkearneystrongman.com/

Sport
- Sport: Strongman
Medal record
Strongman
Representing United States
World's Strongest Man
Qualified	2017 World's Strongest Man
Qualified	2018 World's Strongest Man
Qualified	2019 World's Strongest Man
Qualified	2022 World's Strongest Man
Qualified	2024 World's Strongest Man
Arnold Strongman Classic
6th	2020 Arnold Strongman Classic
5th	2022 Arnold Strongman Classic
8th	2023 Arnold Strongman Classic
Giants Live
1st	2017 North American Open
7th	2017 Scandinavian Open
7th	2018 North American Open
5th	2019 Giants Live Wembley
5th	2019 North American Open
4th	2023 World Open
Arnold Pro Strongman World Series
11th	2016 Forts de Warwick
6th	2017 Africa
7th	2017 Forts de Warwick
1st	2019 Australia
8th	2020 USA
World's Ultimate Strongman
13th	2021 World's Ultimate Strongman
Rogue Invitational
6th	2021 Rogue Invitational
America's Strongest Man
3rd	2023 America's Strongest Man

Rob Kearney is a retired American professional strongman competitor.

Winner of 2017 Giants Live North American Open and 2019 Arnold Australia, he also qualified to the World's Strongest Man competition four times, and was invited to the Arnold Strongman Classic three times.

Kearney is a two-time American log lift record holder, with a best lift of 476 lb (216 kg) in 2020.

== Career ==
Kearney was part of the Cheerleading team in high school and started training in CrossFit. Having found that he was better at heavy lifting, he joined the powerlifting team at college.

When he was 21, Kearney won the 2013 North American Strongman National Championship, and turned professional. He was placed 2nd at 105 kg in America's Strongest Man in 2014 and 2015. He shared first place with Vidas Blekaitis at the 2016 Log Lift World Championships with a lift of 446 lb (202 kg). In the 2019 Log Lift World Championships, he broke Robert Oberst's American national log lift record with a lift of 472 lb (214 kg) and extended it to 476 lb (216 kg) during World's Ultimate Strongman feats of strength series.

Kearney first qualified for the World's Strongest Man competition in 2017, was eliminated in the heats but won 2017 Giants Live North American Open held in Martinsville, Indiana. He qualified for the 2018, 2019, 2022 and 2024 World's Strongest Man competitions.

In 2019, Kearney won the Arnold Australia held in Melbourne, Australia. He also qualified for the Arnold Strongman Classic in 2020, finishing in joint-6th place. Competing 2022 and 2023 he achieved his best result with a 5th place finish in 2022. Kearney took part in the 2021 and 2022 Rogue Invitational, finishing in 6th and 8th place respectively.

Standing at 5 feet 10 inches and weighing under 300 lb (136 kg), Kearney was award the title “Pound for Pound Strongest Man in the World” by Official Strongman Games in 2020.

== Personal records ==
- Deadlift (with suit and straps) – 970 lb (440 kg) (2019 World Deadlift Championships)
- Elephant bar Deadlift (Raw with straps) – 921 lb (418 kg) (2020 Arnold Strongman Classic)
- Double T Squat (with suit) – 961 lb (436 kg) (2022 Arnold Strongman Classic)
- Log press – 476 lb (216 kg) (2020 World's Ultimate Strongman - Feats of Strength series) (Former American Record)

→ Kearney has also done 480 lb (218 kg) during training.

- Axle press – 441 lb (200 kg) (2023 America's Strongest Man)
- Manhood Stone (Max Atlas Stone) – 525 lb (238 kg) over 4 ft bar (during training)
- Inver Stone press – 300 lb (136 kg) (2020 Arnold Strongman Classic) (Joint-World Record)

== Other works ==
In 2022, Hachette Book Group published Strong, a children's picture book about Kearney's journey and identity. The book was the result of a collaboration with author and LGBTQ+ activist Eric Rosswood.

Kearney was a coach at HWPO Training where he was responsible for its strength training program.

== Personal life ==
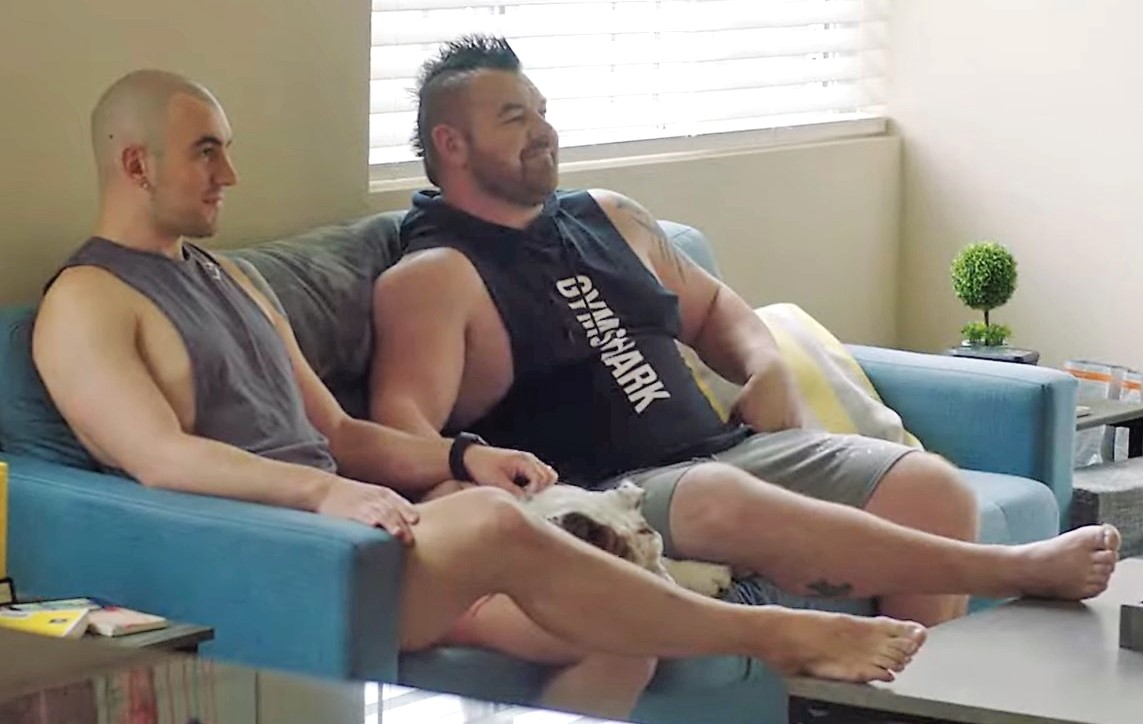
Joey and Rob Kearney in 2022

Kearney is the first openly gay professional strongman, calling himself the "world's strongest gay". He came out as gay in 2014. He lives near Springfield, Massachusetts with his husband Joey, whom he married in 2019.

Kearney was diagnosed with testicular cancer in 2021, for which he underwent surgery. He also suffered a ruptured triceps tendon in 2020 while attempting a new world record in log lift on World's Ultimate Strongman, which forced him to withdraw from the 2020 World Strongest Man.

Kearney was an ambassador for fitness clothing brand Gymshark.
