= 2020 Arnold Strongman Classic =

Arnold Strongman Classic event of 2020

Competition information
- Dates: 6–7 March 2020
- Venue: Greater Columbus Convention Center
- Location: Ohio, Columbus
- Country: United States
- Athletes participating: 10
- Nations participating: 7

Champion(s)
- (Iceland) Hafþór Björnsson

The 2020 Arnold Strongman Classic was a strongman contest that took place in Columbus, Ohio, from March 6–7, 2020 at the Greater Columbus Convention Center. The Arnold Strongman Classic is the finale of the Arnold Strongman Tour and is seen as one of the biggest and most prestigious strongmen events on the circuit.

Due to the COVID-19 pandemic, this year's competition was closed to general spectators with the crowd consisting of the athletes' family or team members.

Hafþór Björnsson won the competition for the third time, becoming only the second man to win the competition three consecutive times after Žydrūnas Savickas. Mateusz Kieliszkowski finished a close 2nd, while Martins Licis secured the 3rd place.

== Qualifying ==
To qualify for the Arnold Strongman Classic, athletes have to either win a sanctioned event on the Arnold Classic Tour or gain enough points to be invited through a wildcard system. Athletes that qualified and their method for qualification are as follows:

Name	Nationality	Method of Qualification
Hafþór Björnsson	Iceland	2019 Arnold Strongman Classic Champion
Rob Kearney	United States	2019 Arnold Classic Australia Champion
Bobby Thompson	United States	2019 Arnold Amateur World Champion
Oleksii Novikov	Ukraine	2019 Arnold Classic South America Champion
Mateusz Kieliszkowski	Poland	2019 Arnold Classic Africa Runner-up
JF Caron	Canada	2019 Arnold Pro Strongman Forts Warwick Champion
Mikhail Shivlyakov	Russia	2019 Arnold Pro Strongman Europe Fourth-Place Finisher
Martins Licis	United States	2020 Arnold Pro Strongman USA Champion
Matjaz Belsak	Slovenia	First Place, Season Qualifying Points
Jerry Pritchett	United States	Second Place, Season Qualifying Points

== Event results ==
=== Event 1: Trial by Stone ===
- Weight: 1 x 124.75 kilograms (275.0 lb) stone overhead press, 1 x 136 kilograms (300 lb) stone overhead press, 1 x 165.5 kilograms (365 lb) natural stone load, 1 x 181.5 kilograms (400 lb) natural stone load, 1 x 186 kilograms (410 lb) Husafell Stone carry.
- Time Limit: 60 seconds per stone.
- Course Length: 15.25 metres (50.0 ft)
- Notes: Stones must be attempted in ascending order. Each stone apparatus is worth a differing number of points. The order of the event will be determined by number of points, then time.

#	Athlete	Nation	Points	Event Points	Overall Points
1	Mateusz Kieliszkowski	Poland	10 in 53.72	10	10
2	Hafþór Björnsson	Iceland	10 in 55.47	9	9
3	Rob Kearney	United States	10 in 2:11.00	8	8
4	JF Caron	Canada	10 in 2:19.00	7	7
5	Oleksii Novikov	Ukraine	8	6	6
6	Jerry Pritchett	United States	7	4.5	4.5
6	Martins Licis	United States	7	4.5	4.5
8	Bobby Thompson	United States	2	3	3
9	Matjaz Belsak	Slovenia	1	1.5	1.5
9	Mikhail Shivlyakov	Russia	1	1.5	1.5

=== Event 2: Bag Over Bar ===
- Weight: 25–50 kilograms (55–110 lb) going up in 2.25 kilograms (5.0 lb) increments.
- Bar Height: 4.5 metres (15 ft)
- Time Limit: 30 seconds per throw
- Notes: All athletes start at 25 kilograms (55 lb). Athletes are allowed to skip weights.

#	Athlete	Nation	Weight	Event Points	Overall Points
1	Hafþór Björnsson	Iceland	90 lb (41 kg)	10	19
2	Mikhail Shivlyakov	Russia	85 lb (38 kg)	9	10.5
3	JF Caron	Canada	75 lb (34 kg)	7.5	14.5
3	Mateusz Kieliszkowski	Poland	75 lb (34 kg)	7.5	17.5
5	Martins Licis	United States	70 lb (32 kg)	6	10.5
6	Rob Kearney	United States	55 lb (25 kg)	3.5	11.5
6	Oleksii Novikov	Ukraine	55 lb (25 kg)	3.5	9.5
6	Bobby Thompson	United States	55 lb (25 kg)	3.5	6.5
6	Jerry Pritchett	United States	55 lb (25 kg)	3.5	8
10	Matjaz Belsak	Slovenia	N/A	1	2.5

=== Event 3: Wheel of Pain ===
- Weight: 9,072 kilograms (20,000 lb) for max distance.
- Time Limit: 60 seconds.
- Notes: Athletes are only to push using their hands and shoulders. Neck usage is not allowed.

#	Athlete	Nation	Distance	Event Points	Overall Points
1	Mateusz Kieliszkowski	Poland	34.1 m (112 ft 0 in)	10	27.5
2	Martins Licis	United States	31.1 m (102 ft 0 in)	9	19.5
3	Hafþór Björnsson	Iceland	31.0 m (101 ft 4 in)	8	27
4	Oleksii Novikov	Ukraine	27.7 m (90 ft 9 in)	7	16.5
5	Rob Kearney	United States	24.0 m (78 ft 8 in)	6	17.5
6	Matjaz Belsak	Slovenia	23.6 m (77 ft 3 in)	5	7.5
7	Jerry Pritchett	United States	22.0 m (72 ft 3 in)	4	12
8	Bobby Thompson	United States	21.4 m (70 ft 2 in)	3	9.5
9	JF Caron	Canada	19.3 m (63 ft 3 in)	2	16.5
10	Mikhail Shivlyakov	Russia	14.6 m (47 ft 10 in)	1	11.5

=== Event 4: Elephant Bar Deadlift ===
- Time Limit: 60 seconds per lift
- Notes: 3 lifts per athlete. Figure-8 straps and deadlift suit are not allowed.

#	Athlete	Nation	Weight	Event Points	Overall Points
1	Hafþór Björnsson	Iceland	465.5 kg (1,026 lb)	10	37
2	JF Caron	Canada	433.5 kg (956 lb)	9	25.5
3	Mikhail Shivlyakov	Russia	427 kg (941 lb)	8	19.5
4	Bobby Thompson	United States	420 kg (926 lb)	7	16.5
5	Rob Kearney	United States	418 kg (921 lb)	6	23.5
6	Martins Licis	United States	411 kg (906 lb)	4.5	24
6	Jerry Pritchett	United States	411 kg (906 lb)	4.5	16.5
8	Mateusz Kieliszkowski	Poland	402 kg (886 lb)	3	30.5
9	Oleksii Novikov	Ukraine	372.5 kg (821 lb)	2	18.5
10	Matjaz Belsak	Slovenia	N/A	1	8.5

=== Event 5: Frame Carry ===
- Weight: 400 kilograms (880 lb)
- Course Length: 10.7 metres (35 ft) ramp
- Time Limit: 30 seconds
- Notes: No straps are allowed. Fastest time wins, then distance.

#	Athlete	Nation	Time	Event Points	Overall Points
1	Mateusz Kieliszkowski	Poland	7.00	10	40.5
2	Jerry Pritchett	United States	10.31	9	25.5
3	Martins Licis	United States	17.37	8	32
4	Hafþór Björnsson	Iceland	9.76 m (32 ft 0 in)	7	44
5	JF Caron	Canada	8.07 m (26 ft 6 in)	6	31.5
6	Mikhail Shivlyakov	Russia	5.87 m (19 ft 3 in)	5	24.5
7	Oleksii Novikov	Ukraine	4.21 m (13 ft 10 in)	4	22.5
8	Bobby Thompson	United States	3.18 m (10 ft 5 in)	3	19.5
9	Matjaz Belsak	Slovenia	2.60 m (8 ft 6 in)	2	10.5
10	Rob Kearney	United States	0.00 m (0 ft 0 in)	1	24.5

=== Event 6: Strategic Cyr Dumbbell Challenge ===
- Weight: 124–150 kilograms (274–330 lb)
- Time Limit: 90 seconds

#	Athlete	Nation	Weight	Event Points	Overall Points
1	Mateusz Kieliszkowski (Note: Mateusz Kieliszkowski's lift of 145 kg (320 lb) is a new record for Cyr dumbbell press for max weight.)	Poland	145 kg (320 lb)	10	50.5
2	Hafþór Björnsson	Iceland	136 kg (300 lb)	8.5	52.5
2	Oleksii Novikov	Ukraine	136 kg (300 lb)	8.5	31
4	Matjaz Belsak	Slovenia	127 kg (280 lb)	7	17.5
5	Martins Licis	United States	124 kg (274 lb)	4.5	36.5
5	Mikhail Shivlyakov	Russia	124 kg (274 lb)	4.5	29
5	Bobby Thompson	United States	124 kg (274 lb)	4.5	24
5	Rob Kearney	United States	124 kg (274 lb)	4.5	29
9	Jerry Pritchett	United States	N/A	1.5	27
9	JF Caron	Canada	N/A	1.5	33

== Final standings ==
#	Athlete	Nation	Points
1st place, gold medalist(s)	Hafþór Björnsson	Iceland	52.5
2nd place, silver medalist(s)	Mateusz Kieliszkowski	Poland	50.5
3rd place, bronze medalist(s)	Martins Licis	United States	36.5
4	JF Caron	Canada	33
5	Oleksii Novikov	Ukraine	31
6	Mikhail Shivlyakov	Russia	29
7	Rob Kearney	United States	29
8	Jerry Pritchett	United States	27
9	Bobby Thompson	United States	24
10	Matjaz Belsak	Slovenia	17.5

Preceded by 2019 Arnold Strongman Classic	Arnold Strongman Classic	Succeeded by 2022 Arnold Strongman Classic
