= Martins Licis =

Latvian strongman

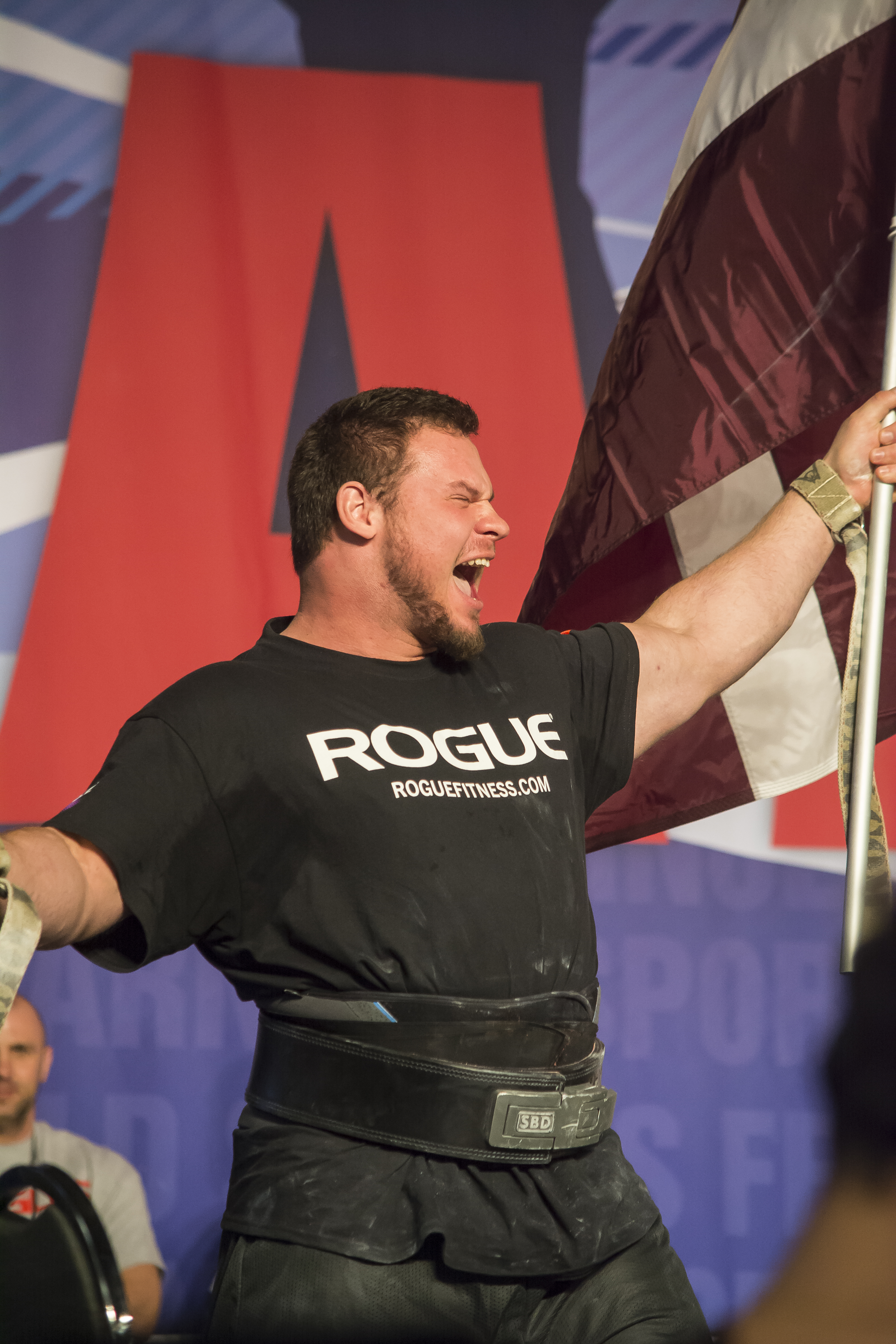
- Licis in March 2017

Personal information
- Native name: Mārtiņš Līcis
- Nicknames: The Dragon (Latvian: Pūķis)
- Born: September 28, 1990 (age 36) Riga, Latvia
- Height: 6 ft 3 in (191 cm)
- Weight: 331–367 lb (150–166 kg)

YouTube information
- Channel: Martins Licis
- Years active: 2009–present
- Genre: Strength Training/Strongman
- Subscribers: 306 thousand
- Views: 41.71 million
- Last updated: 2 April 2025

Sport
- Sport: Strongman; Mas-wrestling
Medal record
Representing United States
World's Strongest Man
6th	2016 World's Strongest Man
4th	2017 World's Strongest Man
4th	2018 World's Strongest Man
1st	2019 World's Strongest Man
2nd	2022 World's Strongest Man
6th	2026 World's Strongest Man
Arnold Strongman Classic
8th	2017 Arnold Strongman Classic
2nd	2019 Arnold Strongman Classic
3rd	2020 Arnold Strongman Classic
1st	2022 Arnold Strongman Classic
8th	2024 Arnold Strongman Classic
3rd	2026 Arnold Strongman Classic
Rogue Invitational
1st	2021 Rogue Invitational
4th	2022 Rogue Invitational
Arnold Pro Strongman World Series
2nd	2016 Forts de Warwick
3rd	2018 Australia
2nd	2018 Forts de Warwick
1st	2018 Europe
1st	2019 USA
1st	2020 USA
Giants Live
3rd	2015 Viking Challenge
2nd	2018 World Tour Finals
3rd	2019 Wembley
World's Ultimate Strongman
7th	2018 World's Ultimate Strongman
Ultimate Strongman
1st	2017 Summermania
1st	2018 Summermania
America's Strongest Man
2nd	2015 America's Strongest Man
Representing Latvia
World's Strongest Man
6th	2026 World's Strongest Man
Rogue Invitational
2nd	2026 Rogue Invitational
Giants Live
5th	2026 Strongman Classic

Martins Licis (Latvian: Mārtiņš Līcis, pronounced [ˈmaːrtiɲʃ ˈliːtsis]; born September 28, 1990) is a Latvian-American professional strongman. He is notable for winning the 2019 World's Strongest Man, the 2022 Arnold Strongman Classic, and the 2021 Rogue Invitational strongman championships.

He's the fourth strongman out of five in history to win both World's Strongest Man and Arnold Strongman Classic competitions with Žydrūnas Savickas, Brian Shaw, Hafþór Júlíus Björnsson and Mitchell Hooper also achieving this.

Licis is the current world record holder of the Steinborn squat, Thor's Hammer one arm grip lift, Inver Stones loading (hitching post setup), Rogue-a-Coaster and Conan's Wheel of Pain strongman events.

== Early life ==
Licis was born in Riga on September 28, 1990. He holds dual citizenship with Latvia and the United States, and speaks Latvian fluently. He has represented both Latvia and the United States in competition, having moved to America with his family at the age of four. He grew up in Amherst, Massachusetts. During summers, he visited his grandparents' farm in Latvia, where he was first introduced to stone lifting by his grandfather Imants Līcis, a sculptor who formerly competed in Olympic weightlifting. After being bullied at age 12, he turned to weight-training to, as he said, become “outrageously strong so that nobody can touch me.” Licis wrestled in high school and began competing in strongman contests while still a teenager.

In 2010, Licis moved to California together with his friend Mikel Monleon. Licis eventually found a job as a personal trainer in West Hollywood, and later found out about the Odd Haugen All-American Strength Classic. Through this, Haugen invited Licis to train at his gym, but only let him compete in the Strength Classic three years later in 2015.

== Career ==
In 2015, Licis placed first in the Odd Haugen All-American Strength Classic. In 2016, Licis reached the World's Strongest Man finals for the first time and placed sixth. He placed fourth in the World's Strongest Man finals in 2017 and 2018. Besides Strongman, Licis also competes in mas-wrestling, a variation of stick wrestling. He won gold in the 2016 MAS Wrestling Open World Championships in Columbus Ohio, beating out previous champion Viktor Kolibabchuk. Licis' first pro triumph came in 2017 at the Ultimate Strongman Summermania, winning the competition representing his home country Latvia.

In 2019, Licis came in second during the Arnold Strongman Classic, behind Hafþór Júlíus Björnsson. In June later that year, however, he won his first World's Strongest Man title, beating out defending champion Hafþór, who finished in third after suffering a torn plantar fascia in his left foot during the heats that significantly hampered him in the final. Licis also placed ahead of Mateusz Kieliszkowski who placed second, and 4-time World's Strongest Man winner Brian Shaw who placed sixth, still recovering from a hamstring injury sustained in the Arnold Strongman Classic earlier in March of the same year. Licis dominated the final, finishing in the top three in all five events, and winning two events outright.

On January 18, 2020, Licis won the Arnold Strongman Santa Monica Qualifier, beating out Brian Shaw by 1 point. This earned him a spot to compete at the Arnold Strongman Classic in Columbus, Ohio on March 8. At the Arnold Strongman Classic, Licis finished 3rd, behind the winner Hafþór and the second place Kieliszkowski.

Licis spent most of the 2020 and 2021 strongman season in recovery, with his ultimate comeback taking place in the inaugural Rogue Invitational Strongman competition in 2021, which boasted the biggest prize purse in the history of strongman competition with four WSM champions competing. Licis beat Tom Stoltman and Oleksii Novikov to win the competition and a top prize of $133,685. The next day he set a new record in Thor's Hammer Lift by lifting a 136-kilogram (300-pound) hammer.

In March 2022, at the 2022 Arnold Strongman Classic, Licis performed consistently well in all five events, with first, second, or third finishes in all but one event. His win in the last event Stone-to-Shoulder for Reps secured him the title of the Arnold Strongman Classic for the first time, after finishing runner-up and third place in 2019 and 2020.

In May 2022, Licis returned to World's Strongest Man for the first time since winning the 2019 contest. He finished 2nd, behind the winner Tom Stoltman and beating Oleksii Novikov on a tie breaker.

In November 2022, Licis competed at the 2022 Rogue Invitational looking to defend the title he won the year before. He picked up a bicep injury midway through the competition and finished 4th.

In March 2024, Licis competed at the 2024 Arnold Strongman Classic, but finished in 8th place. In April 2024, Licis withdrew from the 2024 World's Strongest Man competition due to sciatica in his right leg, and stated that he would take eight months off from strongman competitions to recover.

In March 2026, Licis competed at the 2026 Arnold Strongman Classic, after a two year hiatus from the sport. He was the oldest at 35 years old out of all 9 competitors competing in the male Strongman division. He finished in 3rd place, taking his place on the podium alongside 1st place winner Mitchell Hooper and 2nd place winner Austin Andrade, with no injuries.

In April 2026, Licis competed at World's Strongest Man 2026 in Myrtle Beach. He passed the qualifiers and ended the finals in 6th place. This was his first WSM competition after his two year hiatus. Notably, he represented Latvia instead of America this time, saying he wanted to "give my home country some love", after previously winning WSM in 2019 as an American.

=== Strength Unknown ===
In 2022, Licis and his friend/editor/handler Romark Weiss initiated the 'Strength Unknown' YouTube series where they explore hidden strength cultures around the world. The franchise has released 37 episodes covering Canada, Latvia, Lithuania, Norway, Basque county in Spain, Georgia, China including Tibet, Mongolia, Japan, Polynesian islands, Pakistan, Greece and Burkina Faso.

During a 2025 episode in Norway, Licis pulled the 16-ton Myklebust ship—a full-scale replica of the largest Viking ship ever discovered—single-handedly from the Sagastad Viking Center in Nordfjordeid.

== Personal records ==
- Rogue Elephant bar Deadlift – 440 kg (970 lb) (Raw with straps) (2019 Arnold Strongman Classic)
- IronMind S-Cubed bar Deadlift – 440 kg (970 lb) (with deadlift suit and straps) (2017 World's Strongest Man)
- Axle bar Deadlift with wheels (for reps) (with deadlift suit and straps) – 360 kg (794 lb) x 8 reps (2018 Giants Live World Tour Finals) (Joint-World Record)
- Barrel Deadlift – 290–380 kg (639–838 lb) x 7 reps in 47.00 seconds (2018 World's Strongest Man - Group 4)
- Deadlift Static Hold – 320 kg (705 lb) for 41.25 seconds (2019 World's Strongest Man)
- Silver Dollar Deadlift – 460 kg (1,014 lb) (2018 World's Ultimate Strongman)
- Sorinex Saxon bar Deadlift – 140 kg (309 lb) (2024 LA FIT Expo - Grip Contest) (Former World Record)
- IronMind Rolling Thunder (V2) – 123 kg (271 lb) (2016 Visegrip Viking)
- IronMind Little Big Horn – 90 kg (198 lb) (2012 Visegrip Viking, San Jose)
- Double overhand Axle Deadlift – 210.5 kg (464 lb) (2016 Visegrip Viking)
- Double T Squat (with suit) – 433.5 kg (956 lb) (2022 Arnold Strongman Classic)
- Giant Barbell Squat (for reps) – 340 kg (750 lb) x 9 reps (single-ply suit w/ wraps) (2019 World's Strongest Man)
- Giant Barbell Squat (for reps) – 317.5 kg (700 lb) × 13 reps (single-ply suit w/ wraps) (2017 World's Strongest Man)
- Steinborn Squat – 256.5 kg (565 lb) (2019 Arnold Strongman Classic) (World Record)
- Flintstone barbell split jerk (behind the neck) – 235 kg (518 lb) (2022 World's Strongest Man)
- Log press – 200 kg (441 lb) (2022 Arnold Strongman Classic)
- Axle press – 200 kg (441 lb) (2018 World's Strongest Man)
- Cyr Dumbbell press – 124 kg (273 lb) (2020 Arnold Strongman Classic)
- Giant Dumbbell press – 125 kg (276 lb) x 3 reps (2022 Arnold Strongman Classic)
- Bale Tote – 710 kg (1,565 lb) for 3.78 meters (2017 Arnold Strongman Classic)
- Timber carry – 400 kg (882 lb) (10 meter ramp) in 10.03 seconds (Raw grip) (2022 Arnold Strongman Classic)
- Hercules hold (200 kg (441 lb) in each hand) – 50.94 seconds (2019 Giants Live Wembley)
- Thor's Hammer one arm grip lift – 136 kg (300 lb) (2021 Rogue Invitational) (World Record)
- Atlas Stones – 5 Stones weighing 120–200 kg (265–441 lb) in 20.37 seconds (2019 Giants Live Wembley)
- Atlas Stones – 5 Stones weighing 100–180 kg (220–397 lb) in 18.73 seconds (2018 Giants Live World Tour Finals)
- Inver Stones over hitching post – 5 Stones weighing 125–191 kg (276–421 lb) in 23.53 seconds (2021 Rogue Invitational) (World Record)
- Inver Stone press – 136 kg (300 lb) (2020 Arnold Strongman Classic) (Joint-World Record)
- Húsafell Stone carry – 186 kg (410 lb) for 57.02 metres (187 ft 1 in) (2019 Arnold Strongman Classic)
- Odd Haugen tombstone to shoulder - 186 kg (410 lb) x 2 reps (2019 Arnold Strongman Classic)
- Sandbag over bar – 32 kg (71 lb) over 4.57 metres (15 ft 0 in) (2020 Arnold Strongman Classic)
- Bankier sack carry – 181.5 kg (400 lb) for 46.02 metres (151 ft 0 in) (2019 Arnold USA) (Joint-World Record)
- Rogue-a-Coaster (arm over arm pull) - 363 kg (800 lb) over a 54 ft inclined ramp in 33.83 seconds (2022 Rogue Invitational) (World Record)
- Conan's Wheel of Pain – 9,072 kg (20,000 lb) 36.50 meters (119 3/4 feet) (2019 Arnold Strongman Classic) (World Record)
- Truck pull – 19,000 kg (41,888 lb) 25 meters 'uphill' in 37.84 seconds (2015 Giants Live Viking Challenge) (World Record)

== Competitive record ==
Winning percentage: 29.69%
Podium percentage: 66.66%

	1st	2nd	3rd	Podium	4th	5th	6th	7th	8th	9th	10th	Total
International competitions	8	6	5	19	3	1	2	1	2	0	0	28

== Submission grappling ==
Licis made his submission grappling debut in the beginner over 100 kg division at the ADCC San Diego Open on January 18, 2025 and submitted both of his opponents to win a gold medal. He was then promoted to blue belt in jiu-jitsu by his coach Thiago Rodrigues on March 6, 2025.

== Filmography ==
=== Television ===
Year	Title	Role	Notes
2016–2019, 2022, 2026	World's Strongest Man	Himself – Competitor	1x Champion
2020	Game On	Himself - Competitor	
2020	To Tell The Truth	Guest	

== Media appearances ==
In May 2020, Licis appeared on Game On! as an obstacle, engaging contestants in a strength contest.

In August 2020, Licis appeared on an episode of To Tell The Truth with two other people all of them claiming to be the reigning World's Strongest Man.

In March 2021, Licis appeared in a Geico commercial titled "Worlds Strongest Man Takes On The Recycling".
