= 2019 World's Strongest Man =

Strongman competition in 2019

Competition information
- Dates: 13–16 June 2019
- Venue: Manatee Public Beach
- Location: Bradenton, Florida
- Country: United States
- Athletes participating: 25
- Nations participating: 14

Champion(s)
- (United States) Martins Licis

The 2019 World's Strongest Man was the 42nd edition of the World's Strongest Man competition. It took place in Bradenton, Florida between June 13 and 16. Martins Licis of the United States won the competition for the first time in his career. Mateusz Kieliszkowski of Poland finished second for the second year in a row. Defending champion Hafthor Julius Bjornsson of Iceland finished third, having suffered a torn plantar fascia during the qualifying heats that hampered him throughout the finals.

== Participants ==
- Hafþór Júlíus Björnsson (Iceland)
- Luke Stoltman (United Kingdom)
- Rob Kearney (United States)
- Raffael Gordzielik (Germany)
- Zake Muluzi (United Kingdom)
- Konstantine Janashia (Georgia (country))
- Adam Bishop (United Kingdom)
- Robert Oberst (United States)
- Andreas Ståhlberg (Sweden)
- Sigfus Fossdal (Iceland)
- Martins Licis (United States)
- Tom Stoltman (United Kingdom)
- Aivars Šmaukstelis (Latvia)
- Mikhail Shivlyakov (Russia)
- Eddie Williams (Australia)
- Mateusz Kieliszkowski (Poland)
- JF Caron (Canada)
- Ole Martin Kristiansen (Norway)
- Kevin Faires (United States)
- Laurence Shahlaei (United Kingdom)
- Brian Shaw (United States)
- Trey Mitchell (United States)
- Oleksii Novikov (Ukraine)
- Mark Felix (United Kingdom)
- Gerhard Van Staden (South Africa)

== Heat Results ==
=== Format ===
There are five competitors per group. After four events, the competitor with the highest score qualifies for the final. The competitors in second and third place take part in the Last Man Standing event, which comprises lifting an Atlas Stone over a yoke.

=== Heat 1 ===
- Events: Monster Truck Pull, Giants Medley, Car Deadlift for reps, Log Lift for reps.

#	Name	Nationality	Pts
1	Hafþór Júlíus Björnsson	Iceland	16
2	Rob Kearney	United States	15
3	Luke Stoltman	United Kingdom	13
4	Raffael Gordzielik	Germany	11
5	Zake Muluzi	United Kingdom	4

Last Man Standing

Name	Nationality	Repetitions
Luke Stoltman	United Kingdom	8
Rob Kearney	United States	7

=== Heat 2 ===
- Events: Monster Truck Pull, Giants Medley, Car Deadlift for reps, Log Lift for reps.

#	Name	Nationality	Pts
1	Konstantine Janashia	Georgia	17
2	Robert Oberst	United States	14
3	Adam Bishop	United Kingdom	14
4	Andreas Ståhlberg	Sweden	11
5	Sigfus Fossdal	Iceland	1

Last Man Standing

Name	Nationality	Repetitions
Adam Bishop	United Kingdom	2
Robert Oberst	United States	1

=== Heat 3 ===
- Events: Monster Truck Pull, Giants Medley, Car Deadlift for reps, Log Lift for reps.

#	Name	Nationality	Pts
1	Martins Licis	United States	19
2	Aivars Šmaukstelis	Latvia	12
3	Tom Stoltman	United Kingdom	11.5
4	Mikhail Shivlyakov	Russia	9.5
5	Eddie Williams	Australia	8

Last Man Standing

Name	Nationality	Repetitions
Tom Stoltman	United Kingdom	9
Aivars Smaukstelis	Latvia	8

=== Heat 4 ===
- Events: Monster Truck Pull, Giants Medley, Car Deadlift for reps, Dumbbell Press for reps.

#	Name	Nationality	Pts
1	Mateusz Kieliszkowski	Poland	18.5
2	JF Caron	Canada	17
3	Kevin Faires	United States	12.5
4	Ole Martin Kristiansen (Note: Kristiansen also took part in the Last Man Standing event against Caron, due to Faires not being able to complete a successful stone lift.)	Norway	7
5	Laurence Shahlaei	United Kingdom	3

Last Man Standing

Name	Nationality	Repetitions
JF Caron	Canada	4
Ole Martin Kristiansen	Norway	4

=== Heat 5 ===
- Events: Monster Truck Pull, Giants Medley, Car Deadlift for reps, Dumbbell Press for reps.

#	Name	Nationality	Pts
1	Brian Shaw	United States	19
2	Oleksii Novikov	Ukraine	17
3	Trey Mitchell	United States	10
4	Mark Felix	United Kingdom	6
5	Gerhard Van Staden	South Africa	5

Last Man Standing

Name	Nationality	Repetitions
Trey Mitchell	United States	14
Oleksii Novikov	Ukraine	13

== Finals Events Results ==
=== Event 1: Loading Race ===
- Weight: 1 x 120 kilograms (260 lb) barrel, 1 x 140 kilograms (310 lb) anvil and 2 x 140 kilograms (310 lb) sacks
- Course Length: 12 metres (39 ft)
- Time Limit: 75 seconds

#	Name	Nationality	Time	Event Pts	Overall Pts
1	Tom Stoltman	United Kingdom	0m 39.66	10	10
2	Mateusz Kieliszkowski	Poland	0m 42.11	9	9
3	Martins Licis	United States	0m 43.81	8	8
4	JF Caron	Canada	0m 46.92	7	7
5	Konstantine Janashia	Georgia	0m 46.97	6	6
6	Luke Stoltman	United Kingdom	0m 47.42	5	5
7	Hafþór Júlíus Björnsson	Iceland	0m 48.17	4	4
8	Brian Shaw	United States	0m 48.47	3	3
9	Trey Mitchell	United States	0m 52.96	2	2
10	Adam Bishop	United Kingdom	0m 55.39	1	1

=== Event 2: Overhead Press (Medley) ===
- Weight: 60 kilograms (130 lb) double dumbbells, 100 kilograms (220 lb) circus dumbbell, 160 kilograms (350 lb) circus barbell and 170 kilograms (370 lb) log
- Time Limit: 60 seconds
- Notes: Athletes had a choice of order for the last two implements

#	Name	Nationality	Time	Event Pts	Overall Pts
1	Mateusz Kieliszkowski	Poland	0m 23.86	10	19
2	Martins Licis	United States	0m 27.94	9	17
3	Brian Shaw	United States	0m 30.48	8	11
4	Hafþór Júlíus Björnsson	Iceland	0m 31.16	7	11
5	Tom Stoltman	United Kingdom	0m 46.20	6	16
6	JF Caron	Canada	0m 48.29	5	12
7	Trey Mitchell	United States	0m 54.55	4	6
8	Luke Stoltman	United Kingdom	0m 58.16	3	8
9	Adam Bishop	United Kingdom	3 in 0m 36.19	2	3
10	Konstantine Janashia (Note: Konstantine Janashia withdrew from the competition after tearing his right tricep while attempting to lift the circus dumbbell.)	Georgia	1 in 0m 03.91	1	7

=== Event 3: Squat Lift ===
- Weight: 340 kilograms (750 lb) for repetitions
- Time Limit: 75 seconds

#	Name	Nationality	Repetitions	Event Pts	Overall Pts
1	Martins Licis	United States	9	10	27
2	Brian Shaw	United States	8	9	20
3	Hafþór Júlíus Björnsson	Iceland	7	7	18
3	JF Caron	Canada	7	7	19
3	Mateusz Kieliszkowski	Poland	7	7	26
6	Trey Mitchell	United States	6	5	11
7	Adam Bishop	United Kingdom	5	3	6
7	Luke Stoltman	United Kingdom	5	3	11
7	Tom Stoltman	United Kingdom	5	3	19

=== Event 4: Deadlift (Hold) ===
- Weight: 320 kilograms (710 lb) for as long as possible

#	Name	Nationality	Time	Event Pts	Overall Pts
1	Hafþór Júlíus Björnsson	Iceland	0m 45.29	10	28
2	Martins Licis	United States	0m 41.25	9	36
3	JF Caron	Canada	0m 38.57	8	27
4	Adam Bishop	United Kingdom	0m 36.69	7	13
5	Luke Stoltman	United Kingdom	0m 35.74	6	17
6	Mateusz Kieliszkowski	Poland	0m 35.72	5	31
7	Brian Shaw	United States	0m 30.16	4	24
8	Tom Stoltman	United Kingdom	0m 28.76	3	22
9	Trey Mitchell	United States	0m 23.28	2	13

=== Event 5: Atlas Stones ===
- Weight: 5 stones ranging from 150–210 kilograms (330–460 lb)
- Time Limit: 60 seconds
- Total Weight: 900 kilograms (2,000 lb)

#	Name	Nationality	Time	Event Pts	Overall Pts
1	Martins Licis	United States	5 in 0m 27.41	10	46
2	Hafþór Júlíus Björnsson	Iceland	5 in 0m 28.95	9	37
3	Tom Stoltman	United Kingdom	5 in 0m 35.47	8	30
4	Mateusz Kieliszkowski	Poland	5 in 0m 38.45	7	38
5	Brian Shaw	United States	5 in 0m 39.82	6	30
6	Trey Mitchell	United States	5 in 0m 52.47	5	18
7	JF Caron	Canada	5 in 0m 55.38	4	31
8	Luke Stoltman	United Kingdom	3 in 0m 16.07	3	20
9	Adam Bishop	United Kingdom	3 in 0m 19.42	2	15

== Final standings ==
#	Name	Nationality	Pts
1st place, gold medalist(s)	Martins Licis	United States	46
2nd place, silver medalist(s)	Mateusz Kieliszkowski	Poland	38
3rd place, bronze medalist(s)	Hafþór Júlíus Björnsson	Iceland	37
4	JF Caron	Canada	31
5	Tom Stoltman	United Kingdom	30
6	Brian Shaw	United States	30
7	Luke Stoltman	United Kingdom	20
8	Trey Mitchell	United States	18
9	Adam Bishop	United Kingdom	15
10	Konstantine Janashia	(Georgia (country)) Georgia	7 (Injured)

Preceded by 2018 World's Strongest Man	2019 World's Strongest Man	Succeeded by 2020 World's Strongest Man
