= Oleksii Novikov =

Ukrainian who won 2020 World's Strongest Man title

Personal information
- Born: 11 February 1996 (age 30) Kyiv, Ukraine
- Height: 6 ft 1 in (1.85 m)
- Weight: 132–144 kg (291–317 lb)

Sport
- Sport: Strongman
Medal record
Strongman
Representing Ukraine
World's Strongest Man
| Qualified | 2019 World's Strongest Man |
| 1st | 2020 World's Strongest Man |
| Qualified | 2021 World's Strongest Man |
| 3rd | 2022 World's Strongest Man |
| 3rd | 2023 World's Strongest Man |
Arnold Strongman Classic
| 7th | 2019 Arnold Strongman Classic |
| 5th | 2020 Arnold Strongman Classic |
| 2nd | 2022 Arnold Strongman Classic |
| 6th | 2024 Arnold Strongman Classic |
Rogue Invitational
| 3rd | 2021 Rogue Invitational |
| 1st | 2022 Rogue Invitational |
| 9th | 2023 Rogue Invitational |
Shaw Classic
| 3rd | 2020 Shaw Classic |
| 4th | 2022 Shaw Classic |
| 10th | 2023 Strongest Man on Earth |
| 16th | 2024 Strongest Man on Earth |
World's Ultimate Strongman
| 6th | 2019 World's Ultimate Strongman |
| 1st | 2021 Bahrain |
| 1st | 2021 Dubai |
Europe's Strongest Man
| 2nd | 2021 Europe's Strongest Man |
| 1st | 2022 Europe's Strongest Man |
| 2nd | 2023 Europe's Strongest Man |
| 3rd | 2024 Europe's Strongest Man |
Giants Live
| 3rd | 2019 World Tour Finals |
| 1st | 2021 Strongman Classic |
| 3rd | 2021 World Open |
| 2nd | 2021 Arnold UK |
| 1st | 2022 Strongman Classic |
| 3rd | 2022 World Open |
| 11th | 2023 World Open |
| 6th | 2024 Strongman Classic |
| 6th | 2024 World Open |
| 7th | 2024 US Strongman Championship |
Arnold Pro Strongman World Series
| 2nd | 2017 Amateur |
| 1st | 2018 Amateur |
| 8th | 2018 Africa |
| 1st | 2019 South America |
| 1st | 2019 Africa |
| 2nd | 2019 Europe |
| 11th | 2020 USA |
| 2nd | 2022 UK |
Strongman Champions League
| 4th | 2017 SCL Greece |
Ukraine's Strongest Man
| 1st | 2016 Ukraine's Strongest Man |
| 1st | 2017 Ukraine's Strongest Man |
| 1st | 2018 Ukraine's Strongest Man |
| 1st | 2019 Ukraine's Strongest Man |
| 2nd | 2020 Ukraine's Strongest Man |
| 1st | 2024 Ukraine's Strongest Man |

Oleksii Novikov (Ukrainian: Олексій Новіков, born 11 February 1996) is a Ukrainian professional strongman. He won the 2020 World's Strongest Man competition, becoming the second Ukrainian to win the title since Vasyl Virastyuk in 2004, and at 24 years, 278 days, he is also the second youngest winner in history, being only seven days older than Jón Páll Sigmarsson in 1984. He is also a two time World's Ultimate Strongman (2021 in Bahrain and 2021 in Dubai), the 2022 Rogue Invitational champion, and the 2022 Europe’s Strongest Man.

Novikov is the current world record holder of the hummer tyre deadlift, the Flintstone press, the wrecking ball hold and the one arm giant dumbbell press for reps in 3 weight categories: 100 kg (220 lb), 110 kg (242 lb) and 125 kg (275 lb).

== Biography ==
He was born and raised in Kyiv. He was a student of the Kyiv National University of Trade and Economics (KNUTE) as of 2020.

Outside of strongman, Novikov works as part of the Kyiv Police Special Forces. Novikov was drafted into the Armed Forces of Ukraine in 2022 amidst the Russo-Ukrainian War. Novikov was granted leave from military duty to compete in the 2022 Europe's Strongest Man competition, which he won. He has remained outspoken about the war and its effect on him and his country.

== Strongman career ==
Novikov won Ukraine's Strongest Man every year from 2016 to 2019.

In 2018, he had his first breakthrough performance, winning the Arnold Amateur Strongman World Championships. Through this, he qualified for the 2019 Arnold Strongman Classic, where he placed 7th overall.

In April 2019, he won the Arnold Strongman Classic South America, qualifying for the 2020 Arnold Strongman Classic. He beat Mateusz Kieliszkowski by 0.5 points, making it one of the tightest finishes in a strongman competition since the 2014 World's Strongest Man, where Zydrunas Savickas beat Hafthor Bjornsson by the same amount. In May, Novikov won the Arnold Strongman Classic Africa.

In June, Novikov competed at his first World's Strongest Man contest. In the heats, 4-times World's Strongest Man Brian Shaw won his group. Novikov was in second place, ahead of Trey Mitchell by 7 points. Novikov and Mitchell faced each other in the stone-off, where Mitchell would beat Novikov for a place in the finals.

In September, Novikov competed in the Arnold Strongman Classic Europe, placing 2nd, and in October he competed at World's Ultimate Strongman, placing 6th.

In March 2020, Novikov competed at the Arnold Strongman Classic, placing 5th, an improvement on 7th the year prior.

In May, Novikov took part in the first season of the World's Ultimate Strongman Feats of Strength series to set a world record for the Giant Dumbbell for Reps (100 KG). Novikov set the world record at 11 repetitions.

In November, with the absence of perennial favorite Mateusz Kieliszkowski and defending champion Martins Licis, who did not compete due to injury, Novikov won his first World's Strongest Man title, becoming the second youngest man to win the competition at just 24 years 278 days of age, after Jón Páll Sigmarsson won at 24 years 271 days of age in 1984. In the Max 18-inch Deadlift event, Novikov set a new world record by lifting 537.5 kg (1,185 lb).

In December, Novikov participated in the first ever annual Shaw Classic, placing 3rd overall.

Novikov won both World's Ultimate Strongman shows that occurred in 2021: the first in Bahrain in March, and the second in Dubai in September. In July, Novikov won the Giants Live Strongman Classic in Royal Albert Hall, London. However, at the 2021 World's Strongest Man, he finished fourth in his heat, failing to qualify for the final. In doing so, he became the first World's Strongest Man reigning champion to compete at the following year's event and fail to qualify for the final since Magnús Ver Magnússon in 1997, nearly a quarter of a century prior. In October, Novikov placed 3rd at the first Rogue Invitational strongman competition.

In March, Novikov placed second at the 2022 Arnold Strongman Classic. He later won Europe’s Strongest Man 2022, despite having limited training accessibility due to partaking in the draft for Ukraine.

In June, he placed 3rd at World's Strongest Man, despite winning 3 of 6 events in the final. In July, Novikov defended his Giants Live Strongman Classic championship in Royal Albert Hall, London, winning 3 of 5 events. In August, Novikov would place 3rd at the Giants Live World Open, behind Mitchell Hooper and fellow Ukrainian Pavlo Nakonechnyy.

In August, he placed 4th at the 2022 Shaw Classic, breaking two world records on the first day, with a 1210 lb hummer tire max deadlift followed by 8 reps on the 110 kg circus dumbbell.

In October, at the Rogue Invitational, Novikov won the Cyr Dumbbell Ladder, and was consistent in the other 5 events to win the competition with one of the biggest prize purses in strongman history.

In April 2023, he placed 2nd at Europe's and placed 3rd at World's Strongest Man for the 2nd time in a row. This was his third podium at World's Strongest Man, the most for a Ukrainian. Novikov dealt with injuries the rest of the year, finishing 10th at the Strongest Man on Earth and 9th at Rogue Invitational.

In March 2024, Novikov returned to strongman and placed 6th at the Arnold Strongman Classic. He then placed 3rd at Europe's Strongest Man. He missed World's Strongest Man in May due to injury. During the summer, he placed 6th at two Giants Live shows and 16th at the Strongest Man on Earth.

== Personal records ==
=== In competitions ===
- Equipped Deadlift – 453.5 kg (1,000 lb) (2021 World Deadlift Championships)
- Rogue Elephant bar Deadlift (Raw) – 408.5 kg (901 lb) (2024 Arnold Strongman Classic)
- Hummer Tire Deadlift (from 15 inches) – 549 kg (1,210 lb) (2022 Shaw Classic) (World Record)
- Elevated Wheel Deadlift (from 18 inches) – 550 kg (1,213 lb) (2025 Ultimate Strongman Barcelona Grand Prix) (World Record)
- Double T Squat (equipped) – 411 kg (906 lb) (2022 Arnold Strongman Classic)
- Circus Dumbbell for Reps – 100 kg (220 lb) × 11 (World's Ultimate Strongman, Feats of Strength series, 2020) (World Record)
- Circus Dumbbell for Reps – 110 kg (243 lb) × 8 (2020 Shaw Classic) (World Record)
- Circus Dumbbell for Reps – 125 kg (276 lb) × 7 (2022 Arnold Strongman Classic) (World Record)
- Cyr Dumbbell press – 136 kg (300 lb) (2020 Arnold Strongman Classic)
- Cyr Dumbbell ladder – 5 dumbbells ranging from 115–136 kg (254–300 lb) in 59.59 seconds (2021 Rogue Invitational) (World Record)
- Log Press – 191 kg (421 lb) (2022 Arnold Strongman Classic)
- Log Press for Reps – 180 kg (397 lb) × 4 (2021 World's Ultimate Strongman)
- Axle Press – 190 kg (419 lb) (2021 Giants Live Strongman Classic)
- Flintstone barbell split jerk (behind the neck) – 246 kg (542 lb) (2022 World's Strongest Man) (former world record)
- Max Atlas Stone for reps – 220 kg (485 lb) × 5 reps (2019 Arnold Africa) (World Record)
- Húsafell Stone – 186 kg (410 lb) for 64.47 metres (211 ft 6 in) (2019 Arnold Strongman Classic)
- Inver Stones – 5 Stones weighing 125–191 kg (276–421 lb) in 29.96 seconds (2022 Rogue Invitational)
- Inver Stone press – 136 kg (300 lb) (2024 Arnold Strongman Classic) (Joint-World Record)
- Super Yoke – 455 kg (1,003 lb) for 25 m (82 ft) in 11.69 secs (2019 Arnold Europe) (World Record)
- Frame carry (with straps) – 400 kg (882 lb) 18m course in 7.35 seconds (2021 Arnold UK) (World Record)
- Keg toss – 15 kg (33 lb) over 6.10 metres (20 ft 0 in) (2024 Strongest Man on Earth)
- Wrecking ball hold (no straps) – 267 kg (589 lb) for 127.89 seconds (2024 Giants Live USA Strongman Championships) (World Record)
- Bus pull – 19,000 kg (41,888 lb) for 30 meters 'slight uphill' - 41.51 seconds (2022 World's Strongest Man)

=== In training ===
- Squat (with wraps) – 350 kg (772 lb)
- Bench press (raw) – 230 kg (507 lb), and 225 kg (496 lb) x 2 reps
- Log Press For Reps – 195 kg (430 lb) x 2

== Competitive record ==
Winning percentage: 23.91%
Podium percentage: 65.22%

| | 1st | 2nd | 3rd | Podium | 4th | 5th | 6th | 7th | 8th | 9th | 10th | 11th | 16th | Total |
|---|---|---|---|---|---|---|---|---|---|---|---|---|---|---|
| International competitions | 11 | 9 | 10 | 30 | 3 | 1 | 5 | 2 | 1 | 1 | 1 | 1 | 1 | 46 |

== Filmography ==
=== Television ===
| Year | Title | Role | Notes |
|---|---|---|---|
| 2019–2023 | World's Strongest Man | Himself – Competitor | 1x Champion |

== See also ==
- List of strongmen
