= Ardblair Stones =

Strength and endurance competition

The Ardblair Stones is a strength feat, where nine reinforced concrete lifting stones of ascending weight are used. The 9 stones weigh 18 kg (40 lb), 32 kg (71 lb), 41 kg (90 lb), 50 kg (110 lb), 75 kg (165 lb), 107 kg (236 lb), 118 kg (260 lb), 135 kg (298 lb) and 152 kg (335 lb) respectively. The goal of the competition is to lift each stone sequentially from smallest to largest and place them on top of 4 ft 4 in (52 in) whisky barrels as quickly as possible. The stones are named for Ardblair Castle located in Blairgowrie, Perthshire in Scotland, close to where they originated.

The stones were created by Charlie Blair Oliphant in 2008, based on World's Strongest Man competitions he had seen on TV as a child. Oliphant wanted to create an event that was accessible to all people, regardless of age and ability, and would be free to all. The stones made their debut in September 2012 at the Highland Games. Based on the success and interest of the event, the stones have since toured the United Kingdom.

== World records ==
- Men - 9 out of 9 stones in 21.81 seconds by Tom Stoltman (Scotland) in 2019
- Women - 7 out of 9 stones in 37.14 seconds by Donna Moore (England) in 2019
