= World's Ultimate Strongman =

Annual strongman competition

Tournament information
- Location: United Arab Emirates, Bahrain
- Established: 2018; 8 years ago
- Final year: 2021
- Number of tournaments: 4
- Format: Multi-event competition

Final champion
- (Ukraine) Oleksii Novikov

World's Ultimate Strongman was an annual strongman competition which was held from 2018 to 2021 with the participation of top strongmen from all over the world, determining who is the strongest man in the world. The event was noted for its brute-strength-centricity and expanded the sport to a wider audience outside of Europe and USA. It also introduced the 'feats of strength' series in 2020, ensuring the continuous expansion of the sport during the COVID-19 pandemic. The competition had a number of rival and parallel competitions, including the World's Strongest Man, the Arnold Strongman Classic, Rogue Invitational, Strongest Man on Earth and the Giants Live Tour.

== History ==
The inaugural edition of the competition was held in Dubai, United Arab Emirates and out of a very stacked field of 12 athletes, the Icelandic Giant Hafþór Júlíus Björnsson emerged victorious and was crowned the inaugural champion. The 2019 edition was also held in Dubai and was won by Poland's Mateusz Kieliszkowski.

On February 22, 2020, World's Ultimate Strongman announced the competition would be expanding and would hold the championship in Bahrain at the Bahrain International Circuit with a purse of $350,000 which was the largest for any strongman competition. However, on March 13, 2020, they released a statement entailing that it had to be postponed due to concerns over the COVID-19 pandemic, until a new date would be announced when it's logistically feasible. The 2020 competition was finally held in March 2021 in Muharraq under the name '2021 WUS Strength Island' and in September they hosted the 2021 competition back in Dubai. Both competitions were won by Ukraine's Oleksii Novikov.

The first three competitions out of the four are widely regarded as International strongman majors.

== Championships ==
=== 2018 World's Ultimate Strongman ===
Events: Truck pull, Arm over arm pull, Silver Dollar Deadlift, Overhead Medley, Super Yoke, Atlas stones

Place	Athlete	Nation	Points
1st place, gold medalist(s)	Hafþór Júlíus Björnsson	Iceland	60.5
2nd place, silver medalist(s)	Brian Shaw	United States	57
3rd place, bronze medalist(s)	Mateusz Kieliszkowski	Poland	52.5
4	JF Caron	Canada	48
5	Laurence Shahlaei	United Kingdom	42.5
6	Konstantine Janashia	Georgia	38
7	Martins Licis	United States	34.5
8	Tom Stoltman	United Kingdom	31.5
9	Terry Hollands	United Kingdom	31
10	Žydrūnas Savickas	Lithuania	27.5
11	Luke Stoltman	United Kingdom	25
12	Cheick Sanou	Burkina Faso	18

=== 2019 World's Ultimate Strongman ===
Events: Deadlift, Truck pull, Log lift, Medley, Atlas stones

Place	Athlete	Nation	Points
1st place, gold medalist(s)	Mateusz Kieliszkowski	Poland	55.5
2nd place, silver medalist(s)	Luke Stoltman	United Kingdom	50.5
3rd place, bronze medalist(s)	Tom Stoltman	United Kingdom	47.5
4	Brian Shaw	United States	44.5
5	Oleksii Novikov	Ukraine	42.5
5	Rauno Heinla	Estonia	42.5
7	JF Caron	Canada	39
8	Mikhail Shivlyakov	Russia	36
9	Matjaz Belsak	Slovenia	31.5
10	Ramin Farajnejad	Iran	30
11	Cheick Sanou	Burkina Faso	28
12	Krzysztof Radzikowski	Poland	24
13	Jerry Pritchett	United States	21.5
14	Terry Hollands	United Kingdom	15

=== 2020 World's Ultimate Strongman (a.k.a. 2021 WUS Strength Island) ===
Events: Axel Deadlift, Flag Hoist, Circus Dumbbell press, Loading race, Atlas stones

Place	Athlete	Nation	Points
1st place, gold medalist(s)	Oleksii Novikov	Ukraine	70
2nd place, silver medalist(s)	JF Caron	Canada	58
3rd place, bronze medalist(s)	Aivars Šmaukstelis	Latvia	55
4	Luke Stoltman	United Kingdom	47
5	Tom Stoltman	United Kingdom	43
5	Ramin Farajnejad	Iran	43
5	Mohammed Ezatpour	Iran	43
8	Bobby Thompson	United States	41.5
9	Eyþór Ingólfsson Melsteð	Iceland	33.5
10	Adam Bishop	United Kingdom	33
11	Rauno Heinla	Estonia	32
12	Ervin Toots	Estonia	30.5
13	Rob Kearney	United States	26.5
14	Konstantine Janashia	Georgia	24
15	Mikhail Shivlyakov	Russia	17

=== 2021 World's Ultimate Strongman ===
Events: Log lift, Super yoke, Farmer's walk, Chain Railway carriage, Atlas stones

Place	Athlete	Nation	Points
1st place, gold medalist(s)	Oleksii Novikov	Ukraine	45.5
2nd place, silver medalist(s)	Mateusz Kieliszkowski	Poland	44.5
3rd place, bronze medalist(s)	Aivars Šmaukstelis	Latvia	34.5
4	JF Caron	Canada	32
5	Konstantine Janashia	Georgia	27
6	Bobby Thompson	United States	26.5
7	Mohammed Ezatpour	Iran	18
8	Ervin Toots	Estonia	17
9	Rauno Heinla	Estonia	15
10	Ramin Farajnejad	Iran	12

== Championship breakdown ==
=== Podiums ===
Year	Champion	Runner-up	3rd place	Location
2018	(Iceland) Hafþór Júlíus Björnsson	(United States) Brian Shaw	(Poland) Mateusz Kieliszkowski	Dubai, United Arab Emirates
2019	(Poland) Mateusz Kieliszkowski	(United Kingdom) Luke Stoltman	(United Kingdom) Tom Stoltman	Dubai, United Arab Emirates
2020	(Ukraine) Oleksii Novikov	(Canada) Jean-François Caron	(Latvia) Aivars Šmaukstelis	Muharraq, Bahrain
2021	(Ukraine) Oleksii Novikov	(Poland) Mateusz Kieliszkowski	(Latvia) Aivars Šmaukstelis	Dubai, United Arab Emirates

=== Most championships ===
No.	Champion	Times	Years
1	(Ukraine) Oleksii Novikov	2	2020, 2021

=== Most podium finishes ===
No.	Name	Times
1	(Poland) Mateusz Kieliszkowski	3
2	(Ukraine) Oleksii Novikov	2
2	(Latvia) Aivars Šmaukstelis	2

=== Championships by country ===
Country	Gold	Silver	Bronze	Total
Ukraine	2	0	0	2
Poland	1	1	1	3
Iceland	1	0	0	1
United Kingdom	0	1	1	2
United States	0	1	0	1
Canada	0	1	0	1
Latvia	0	0	2	2

== Feats of Strength series ==
Due to the postponement of worldwide sporting events and travel restrictions being in place for many countries due to the COVID-19 pandemic, World's Ultimate Strongman announced an at home/private gym Feats of Strength series with differing strongman record attempts to be live streamed for free. Below are the record attempts (Men's World Record unless otherwise stated):

=== Season 1 ===
Date	Attempt	Athlete	Record Broken?	Existing Record and Holder	New Record if Broken
May 2, 2020	Maximum Deadlift (standard bar)	(Iceland) Hafþór Júlíus Björnsson	Yes	500 kg (1,102 lb) ( (United Kingdom) Eddie Hall)	501 kg (1,105 lb)
May 16, 2020	Maximum Log Lift	(United Kingdom) Luke Stoltman	No	228 kg (503 lb) ( (Lithuania) Žydrūnas Savickas)	–
May 23, 2020	Maximum Atlas Stone Lift	(United Kingdom) Tom Stoltman	Yes	273 kg (602 lb) ( (United Kingdom) Tom Stoltman)	286 kg (631 lb)
May 30, 2020	100 kg (220 lb) Dumbbell Press for Repetitions	(Ukraine) Oleksii Novikov	Yes	10 repetitions ( (Iceland) Hafþór Júlíus Björnsson)	11 repetitions
June 6, 2020	Maximum Atlas Stone Lift; Women's Under-64kg Record	(United Kingdom) Rhianon Lovelace	Yes	139 kg (306 lb) ( (Australia) Alana Curnow)	141 kg (311 lb)
June 13, 2020	Maximum Log Lift; American Record	(United States) Rob Kearney	Yes	214 kg (472 lb) ( (United States) Rob Kearney)	216 kg (476 lb)
June 20, 2020	400 kg (882 lb) Deadlift (standard bar) for Repetitions	(United States) Jerry Pritchett	No	5 repetitions ( (Canada) Jean-François Caron) ( (Georgia (country)) Konstantine Janashia)	–
June 20, 2020	400 kg (882 lb) Deadlift (standard bar) for Repetitions	(Estonia) Rauno Heinla	Equalled	5 repetitions ( (Canada) Jean-François Caron) ( (Georgia (country)) Konstantine Janashia)	–
June 20, 2020	Raw Bench Press (power bar)	(United States) Julius Maddox ^{1}	No	349 kg (769 lb) ( (United States) Julius Maddox)	–
June 27, 2020	Maximum Deadlift (standard bar); Masters (Over-40s) Record	(United Kingdom) Terry Hollands	No	430 kg (948 lb) ( (Republic of Ireland) James Hickey)	–
June 27, 2020	Maximum Deadlift (standard bar); Masters (Over-40s) Record	(Russia) Mikhail Shivlyakov	No	430 kg (948 lb) ( (Republic of Ireland) James Hickey)	–
July 4, 2020	Maximum Log Lift; Women's Record	(United Kingdom) Andrea Thompson	Yes	129 kg (284 lb) ( (United States) Danielle Vaji)	135 kg (298 lb)
July 11, 2020	400 kg (882 lb) Deadlift (standard bar) for Repetitions	(United Kingdom) Adam Bishop ^{2}	No	5 repetitions ( (Canada) Jean-François Caron) ( (Estonia) Rauno Heinla) ( (Georgia (country)) Konstantine Janashia)	–
July 11, 2020	400 kg (882 lb) Deadlift (standard bar) for Repetitions	(Canada) Jean-François Caron	No	5 repetitions ( (Canada) Jean-François Caron) ( (Estonia) Rauno Heinla) ( (Georgia (country)) Konstantine Janashia)	–

^{1} It was found during the event that Maddox's bar had been misloaded with one side being 25 kg heavier than the other.
^{2} It was found during the event that Bishop had 402.5 kg on the barbell, rather than 400 kg, causing an unofficial world record of 402.5 kg for 4 repetitions.

=== Season 2 ===
Date	Attempt	Athlete	Record Broken?	Existing Record and Holder	New Record if Broken
September 13, 2020	400 kg (882 lb) Deadlift (standard bar) for Repetitions	(Estonia) Rauno Heinla	Yes	5 repetitions ( (Canada) Jean-François Caron) ( (Estonia) Rauno Heinla) ( (Georgia (country)) Konstantine Janashia)	6 repetitions
September 13, 2020	400 kg (882 lb) Deadlift (standard bar) for Repetitions	(Georgia (country)) Konstantine Janashia	No	5 repetitions ( (Canada) Jean-François Caron) ( (Estonia) Rauno Heinla) ( (Georgia (country)) Konstantine Janashia)	–
September 20, 2020	400 kg (882 lb) Deadlift (standard bar) for Repetitions	(United States) Trey Mitchell	No	6 repetitions ( (Estonia) Rauno Heinla)	–
September 27, 2020	Maximum Atlas Stone Lift	(United Kingdom) Tom Stoltman	No	286 kg (631 lb) ( (United Kingdom) Tom Stoltman)	–
September 27, 2020	Maximum Atlas Stone Lift; Women's Record	(United Kingdom) Donna Moore	Yes	162 kg (357 lb) ( (United Kingdom) Donna Moore)	171 kg (377 lb)
October 4, 2020	Maximum Deadlift (strongwoman) - standard bar Women's Record	(United Kingdom) Andrea Thompson	Yes	275 kg (606 lb) ( (United States) Melissa Edwards)	290 kg (639 lb)
October 11, 2020	Maximum Log Lift	(United States) Rob Kearney	No	228 kg (503 lb) ( (Lithuania) Žydrūnas Savickas)	–
October 11, 2020	Maximum Log Lift	(United Kingdom) Luke Stoltman	No	228 kg (503 lb) ( (Lithuania) Žydrūnas Savickas)	–
October 18, 2020	Maximum Deadlift (standard bar)	(Estonia) Rauno Heinla	No	501 kg (1,105 lb) ( (Iceland) Hafþór Júlíus Björnsson)	–
October 18, 2020	Maximum Deadlift (standard bar)	(Russia) Ivan Makarov	No	501 kg (1,105 lb) ( (Iceland) Hafþór Júlíus Björnsson)	–
October 18, 2020	Maximum Deadlift (standard bar); Masters (Over-40s) Record	(Russia) Mikhail Shivlyakov	Yes	435 kg (959 lb) (Republic of Ireland) (James Hickey)	436 kg (961 lb)

== Commonly contested events ==
- Deadlift – Lifting weights or vehicles straight off the ground until knees lock in a standing position. The 2018 edition consisted of a max Silver Dollar Deadlift, a variation in which the weight is lifted from 18 inches (460 mm). Straps are allowed for this variation. The 2019 edition used the conventional strongman version of the deadlift, using a standard deadlift bar with straps and a deadlift suit.
- Super Yoke – Apparatus composed of a crossbar and two uprights. The uprights each have a heavy weight attached to them, such as a refrigerator or diesel engine, and the competitors must carry the yoke on their shoulders for a short distance.
- Shield Carry – Athletes compete in carrying a 'shield' usually weighing between 160–180 kilograms (350–400 lb) for distance or a set distance for the fastest time. The Shield Carry can be its own event or be used alongside the super yoke.
- Press Medley – Athletes must press various equipment overhead such as a log, axle, circus barbell, and giant dumbbell. The event is scored based on the number of implements completed, then the fastest time.
- Vehicle pull – Vehicles such as transport trucks, trams, boxcars, buses, or planes are pulled across a 100-foot (30 m) course as fast as possible. One variation sees the competitors pull the object with a rope toward them. Another has them attached to a rope which is attached to a vehicle, while they use another rope to pull themselves down the course.
- McGlashen Stones / Atlas Stones – Five heavy round stones increasing in weight from 170–225 kilograms (375–496 lb) are lifted and set on platforms. When the stones were first introduced to the competition, it was an individual event and the platforms were all of equal height. The modern Atlas Stones event takes place on a 16–33-foot (5–10 m) long course and the competitors participate two at a time. In the 2019 edition, a 10 stone event was introduced with stones ranging from 100–200 kilograms (220–440 lb), a first of its kind.
