= 2019 Arnold Strongman Classic =

Arnold Strongman Classic event of 2019

Competition information
- Dates: 1–2 March 2019
- Venue: Greater Columbus Convention Center
- Location: Ohio, Columbus
- Country: United States
- Athletes participating: 10
- Nations participating: 8

Champion(s)
- (Iceland) Hafþór Björnsson

The 2019 Arnold Strongman Classic was a strongman contest that took place in Ohio, Columbus from 1–2 March 2019 at the Greater Columbus Convention Center. The Arnold Strongman Classic is the finale of the Arnold Strongman Tour and is seen as one of the biggest and most prestigious strongmen events on the circuit.

Defending champion Iceland's Hafþór Björnsson won the competition for the second consecutive time. American Martins Licis finished 2nd while Poland's Mateusz Kieliszkowski came in 3rd.

== Qualifying ==
To qualify for the Arnold Strongman Classic athletes have to either win a sanctioned event on the Arnold Classic Tour or gain enough points to be invited through a wildcard system. Athletes that qualified and their method for qualification are as follows:

Name	Nationality	Method of Qualification
Hafþór Björnsson	Iceland	2018 Arnold Strongman Classic Champion
Rauno Heinla	Estonia	2018 Arnold Classic Australia Champion
Oleksii Novikov	Ukraine	2018 Arnold Amateur World Champion
Mikhail Shivlyakov	Russia	2018 Arnold Classic South America Champion
JF Caron	Canada	2018 Arnold Classic Africa Champion
Brian Shaw	United States	2018 Arnold Pro Strongman Forts Warwick Champion
Martins Licis	United States	2018 Arnold Classic Europe Champion
Mateusz Kieliszkowski	Poland	Wild Card 25 points
Jerry Pritchett	United States	Wild Card 25 points
Matjaz Belsak	Slovenia	Wild Card 25 points

== Event results ==
=== Event 1: Elephant Bar Deadlift ===
- Weight: Starting weight was 340 kilograms (750 lb).
- Time Limit: 60 seconds per lift
- Notes: 3 lifts per athlete, weights to be submitted before each round.

#	Athlete	Nation	Weight	Event Points	Overall Points
1	Hafþór Björnsson (Note: Hafþór Björnsson's lift of 474 kilograms (1,045 lb) is a new world record for the elephant deadlift bar.)	Iceland	474 kg (1,045 lb)	10	10
2	Brian Shaw	United States	463 kg (1,021 lb)	9	9
3	Jerry Pritchett	United States	442 kg (974 lb)	7.5	7.5
3	Mikhail Shivlyakov	Russia	442 kg (974 lb)	7.5	7.5
5	Martins Licis	United States	440 kg (970 lb)	6	6
6	Rauno Heinla	Estonia	431 kg (950 lb)	5	5
7	Matjaz Belsak	Slovenia	404 kg (891 lb)	4	4
8	Mateusz Kieliszkowski	Poland	395 kg (871 lb)	3	3
9	Oleksii Novikov	Ukraine	381 kg (840 lb)	2	2
10	JF Caron (Note: JF Caron sustained an injury in this event and took no further part in the competition.)	Canada	N/A	1	1

=== Event 2: Husafell Stone Carry ===
- Weight: 186 kilograms (410 lb) for max distance.
- Time Limit: 2 Minutes
- Notes: This is not the actual Husafell Stone but a replica produced by Rogue Fitness.

#	Athlete	Nation	Distance	Event Points	Overall Points
1	Hafþór Björnsson	Iceland	66.7 m (218 ft 11 in)	10	20
2	Oleksii Novikov	Ukraine	64.4 m (211 ft 6 in)	9	11
3	Rauno Heinla	Estonia	58.9 m (193 ft 3 in)	8	13
4	Martins Licis	United States	57.0 m (187 ft 1 in)	7	13
5	Mateusz Kieliszkowski	Poland	55.5 m (182 ft 3 in)	6	9
6	Matjaz Belsak	Slovenia	55.1 m (180 ft 8 in)	5	9
7	Mikhail Shivlyakov	Russia	40.4 m (132 ft 6 in)	4	11.5
8	Brian Shaw	United States	31.7 m (104 ft 1 in)	3	12
9	Jerry Pritchett	United States	29.1 m (95 ft 5 in)	2	9.5

=== Event 3: Wheel of Pain ===
- Weight: 9,072 kilograms (20,000 lb) for max distance.
- Time Limit: 60 seconds.

#	Athlete	Nation	Distance	Event Points	Overall Points
1	Martins Licis	United States	36.5 m (119 ft 9 in)	10	23
2	Hafþór Björnsson	Iceland	36.4 m (119 ft 3 in)	9	29
3	Oleksii Novikov	Ukraine	34.4 m (113 ft 0 in)	8	19
4	Matjaz Belsak	Slovenia	32.2 m (105 ft 6 in)	7	16
5	Mikhail Shivlyakov	Russia	31.4 m (103 ft 0 in)	6	17.5
6	Rauno Heinla	Estonia	31.3 m (102 ft 9 in)	5	18
7	Mateusz Kieliszkowski	Poland	30.9 m (101 ft 6 in)	4	13
8	Brian Shaw	United States	28.9 m (95 ft 0 in)	3	15
9	Jerry Pritchett	United States	23.4 m (76 ft 9 in)	2	11.5

=== Event 4: Austrian Oak ===
- Weight: 195 kilograms (430 lb) Heavy log. 175 kilograms (386 lb) Light log. For max repetitions.
- Time Limit: 90 Seconds
- Notes: Repetitions on the heavy log gain more points than repetitions on the light log. * Denote repetitions on the light log.

#	Athlete	Nation	Repetitions	Event Points	Overall Points
1	Hafþór Björnsson	Iceland	2	8.5	37.5
1	Martins Licis	United States	2	8.5	31.5
1	Mateusz Kieliszkowski	Poland	2	8.5	21.5
1	Mikhail Shivlyakov	Russia	2	8.5	26
5	Brian Shaw (Note: After this event Brian Shaw withdrew due to an injury that occurred in event 1 and took no further part in the competition.)	United States	1	6	21
6	Rauno Heinla	Estonia	2 (light log)	4.5	22.5
6	Matjaz Belsak	Slovenia	2 (light log)	4.5	20.5
8	Jerry Pritchett (Note: After this event Jerry Pritchett withdrew due to injury and took no further part in the competition.)	United States	1 (light log)	3	11.5
9	Oleksii Novikov (Note: Oleksii Novikov sustained an injury in this event however he completed the remaining event.)	Ukraine	0	0	19

=== Event 5: Stone to Shoulder ===
- Weight: 186 kilograms (410 lb) For max repetitions.
- Time Limit: 2 Minutes 30 seconds.
- Notes: Athletes were awarded for getting the stone to their lap or torso but not completing the full repetition.

#	Athlete	Nation	Repetitions	Event Points	Overall Points
1	Mateusz Kieliszkowski	Poland	5	10	31.5
2	Martins Licis	United States	2	9	40.5
3	Hafþór Björnsson	Iceland	1	7.5	45
3	Matjaz Belsak	Slovenia	1	7.5	28
5	Oleksii Novikov	Ukraine	0	6	25
6	Mikhail Shivlyakov	Russia	0	4.5	30.5
6	Rauno Heinla	Estonia	0	4.5	27

== Final standings ==
#	Athlete	Nation	Points
1st place, gold medalist(s)	Hafþór Björnsson	Iceland	45
2nd place, silver medalist(s)	Martins Licis	United States	40.5
3rd place, bronze medalist(s)	Mateusz Kieliszkowski	Poland	31.5
4	Mikhail Shivlyakov	Russia	30.5
5	Matjaz Belsak	Slovenia	28
6	Rauno Heinla	Estonia	27
7	Oleksii Novikov	Ukraine	25
8	Brian Shaw	United States	21
9	Jerry Pritchett	United States	14.5
10	JF Caron	Canada	1

Preceded by 2018 Arnold Strongman Classic	Arnold Strongman Classic	Succeeded by 2020 Arnold Strongman Classic
