= 2021 Giants Live Arnold Strongman UK =

#Worlds strongest man

Competition information
- Dates: 3 October 2021
- Venue: National Exhibition Centre
- Location: Birmingham
- Country: United Kingdom
- Athletes participating: 10
- Nations participating: 7

Champion(s)
- (United States) Evan Singleton

The 2021 Giants Live Arnold Strongman UK was a strongman competition that took place in Birmingham, England on 3 October 2021 at the National Exhibition Centre. This event was part of the 2021 Giants live tour and the first ever Arnold Sports Festival in the UK..

== Participants ==
- Oleksii Novikov (Ukraine)
- Mark Felix (United Kingdom)
- Tom Stoltman (United Kingdom)
- Andy Black (United Kingdom)
- Pa O'Dwyer (Republic of Ireland)
- Evan Singleton (United States)
- Nedžmin Ambešković (Bosnia and Herzegovina)
- Luke Stoltman (United Kingdom)
- Trey Mitchell (United States)
- JF Caron (Canada)

== Results of events ==
=== Event 1: Hercules Hold ===
- Athlete must stand between and hold on to 160 kilograms (350 lb) pillars for as long as possible.

#	Name	Nationality	Time	Event Pts	Overall Pts
1	Mark Felix	United Kingdom	1m 21.62	10	10
2	Evan Singleton	United States	1m 18.11	9	9
3	JF Caron	Canada	1m 14.27	8	8
4	Trey Mitchell	United States	1m 05.29	7	7
5	Oleksii Novikov	Ukraine	59.56	6	6
6	Andy Black	United Kingdom	54.59	5	5
7	Luke Stoltman (Note: Luke Stoltman sustained an injury in this event and took no further part in the competition.)	United Kingdom	50.46	4	4
8	Nedžmin Ambešković	Bosnia and Herzegovina	47.99	3	3
9	Pa O'Dwyer	Ireland	45.73	2	2
10	Tom Stoltman	United Kingdom	43.57	1	1

=== Event 2: Frame Carry ===
- 400 kilograms (880 lb) frame carry over a 20 metres (66 ft) course.

#	Name	Nationality	Time	Event Pts	Overall Pts
1	Oleksii Novikov	Ukraine	7.35	10	16
2	Evan Singleton	United States	8.50	9	18
3	Mark Felix	United Kingdom	9.75	8	18
4	JF Caron	Canada	9.94	7	15
5	Andy Black	United Kingdom	12.02	6	11
6	Nedžmin Ambešković	Bosnia and Herzegovina	12.48	5	8
7	Trey Mitchell	United States	13.91	4	11
8	Pa O'Dwyer	Ireland	14.95	3	5
9	Tom Stoltman (Note: Tom Stoltman sustained an injury in this event and took no further part in the competition.)	United Kingdom	DNF 7.05 metres (23.1 ft)	2	3

=== Event 3: Deadlift ===
- Weight: 360 kilograms (790 lb) for as many repetitions as possible.
- Time Limit: 60 seconds
- Notes: This event was completed on an axle bar.

#	Name	Nationality	Repetitions	Event Pts	Overall Pts
1	Oleksii Novikov	Ukraine	8	10	26
2	Trey Mitchell	United States	7	9	20
3	Evan Singleton	United States	5	7	25
3	JF Caron	Canada	5	7	22
3	Nedžmin Ambešković	Bosnia and Herzegovina	5	7	15
6	Mark Felix	United Kingdom	4	5	23
7	Andy Black	United Kingdom	3	4	15
8	Pa O'Dwyer	Ireland	2	3	8

=== Event 4: Dumbell Press ===
- Weight: 100 kilograms (220 lb) for as many repetitions as possible.
- Time Limit 75 seconds.

#	Name	Nationality	Repetitions	Event Pts	Overall Pts
1	Oleksii Novikov	Ukraine	8	10	36
2	Evan Singleton	United States	7	9	34
3	Trey Mitchell	United States	6	7.5	27.5
3	JF Caron	Canada	6	7.5	29.5
5	Pa O'Dwyer (Note: Pa O'Dwyer sustained an injury in this event and took no further part in the competition.)	Ireland	3	6	6
N/A	Mark Felix	United Kingdom	0	0	23
N/A	Nedžmin Anbešković	Bosnia and Herzegovina	0	0	15
N/A	Andy Black	United Kingdom	0	0	15

=== Event 5: Atlas Stones ===
- 5 Atlas stone series ranging from 100–180 kilograms (220–400 lb).

#	Name	Nationality	Time	Event Pts	Overall Pts
1	Andy Black	United Kingdom	5 in 18.28	10	25
2	Trey Mitchell	United States	5 in 18.41	9	36.5
3	Evan Singleton	United States	5 in 19.44	8	42
4	JF Caron	Canada	5 in 19.60	7	36.5
5	Oleksii Novikov	Ukraine	5 in 20.55	6	42
6	Mark Felix	United Kingdom	5 in 23.43	5	28
7	Nedžmin Ambešković	Bosnia and Herzegovina	5 in 40.12	4	19

== Final results ==
#	Name	Nationality	Pts
1	Evan Singleton	United States	42
2	Oleksii Novikov	Ukraine	42
3	Trey Mitchell	United States	36.5
4	JF Caron	Canada	36.5
5	Mark Felix	United Kingdom	28
6	Andy Black	United Kingdom	25
7	Nedžmin Ambešković	Bosnia and Herzegovina	19
8	Pa O'Dwyer	Ireland	14
9	Luke Stoltman	United Kingdom	4
10	Tom Stoltman	United Kingdom	3
