= Mikhail Shivlyakov =

Russian marine and strongman

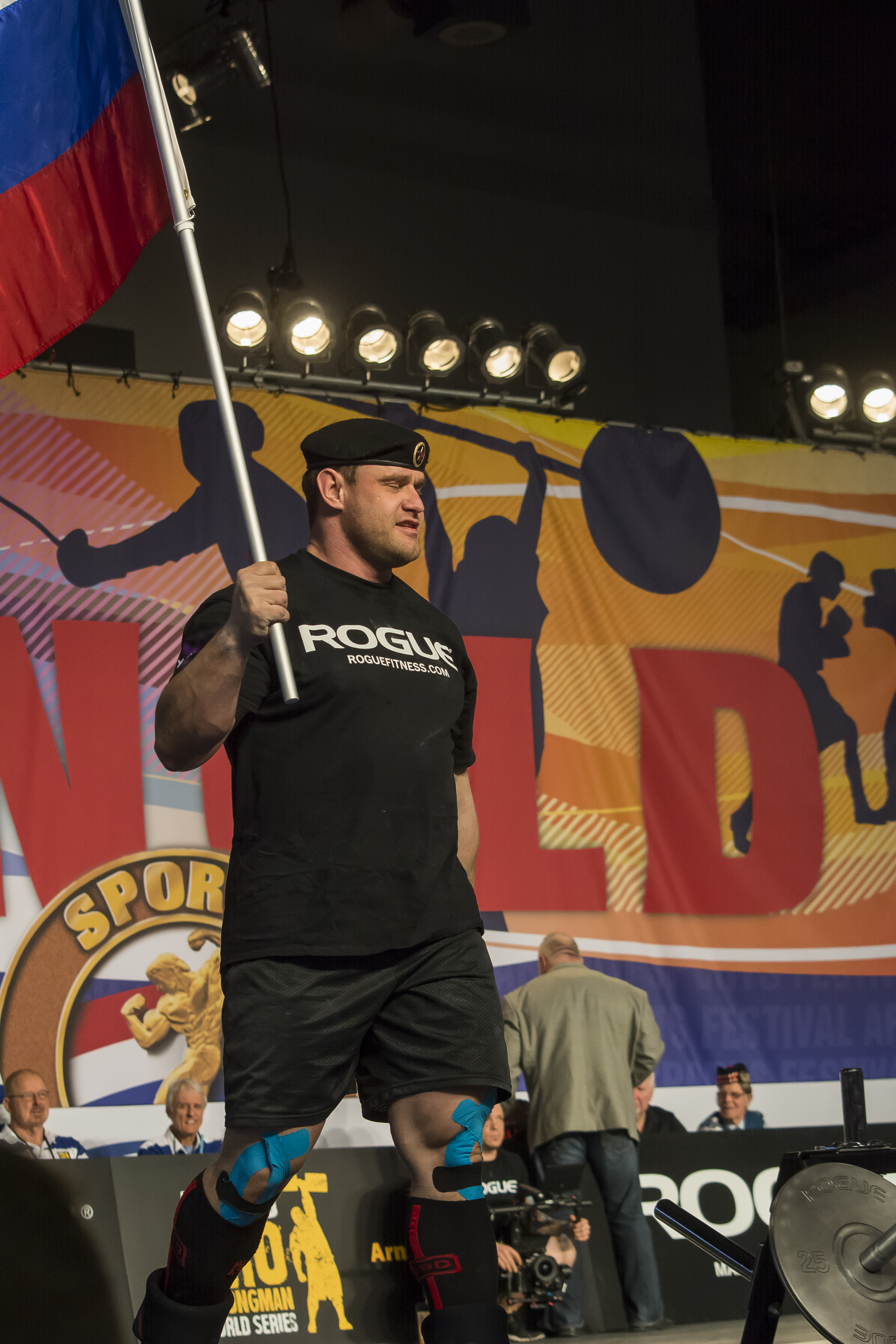

Personal information
- Nickname: Siberian Force
- Born: 30 April 1980 (age 46)
- Height: 6 ft 1 in (1.85 m)
- Weight: 140 kg (310 lb)

Sport
- Sport: Strongman
Medal record
Strongman
Representing Russia
World's Strongest Man
Qualified	2014 World's Strongest Man
9th	2015 World's Strongest Man
Qualified	2017 World's Strongest Man
Qualified	2018 World's Strongest Man
Qualified	2019 World's Strongest Man
Qualified	2020 World's Strongest Man
Qualified	2021 World's Strongest Man
Arnold Strongman Classic
7th	2014 Arnold Strongman Classic
7th	2016 Arnold Strongman Classic
5th	2017 Arnold Strongman Classic
3rd	2018 Arnold Strongman Classic
4th	2019 Arnold Strongman Classic
6th	2020 Arnold Strongman Classic
Arnold Strongman Pro Series
3rd	2018 Asia
2nd	2017 Australia
1st	2018 South America
4th	2019 Europe
4th	2019 Australia
4th	2019 Africa
Arnold Amateur
6th	2011
2nd	2012
1st	2013
Europe's Strongest Man
5th	2019 Europe's Strongest Man
Siberian Power Show
5th	2025 Siberian Power Show
World Strongman Federation
3rd	2016 WSF World Cup India
1st	2016 WSF World Cup Russia
Força Bruta
1st	2020 Força Bruta
1st	2021 Força Bruta

Mikhail Vasilyevich Shivlyakov (Russian: Михаил Васильевич Шивляков; born 30 April 1980) is a Russian professional strongman and former Russian Marine.

== Early life ==
Shivlyakov was born on April 30, 1980, in the city of Kiselyovsk, Kemerovo Region. From 1998 to 2000, he served in the Baltic Fleet, Black Sea Fleet and The Marines (Russian Naval Infantry) earning the ranks of sergeant and deputy platoon commander. Shivlyakov is a recipient of Medal of Suvorov and Medal of Zhukov.

After his service in the military, Shivlyakov began powerlifting, winning several competitions and breaking the deadlift record at Kemerovo Region.

In 2007, he debuted as a participant in the 'Bogatyr Baikal' strongman competition and continued competing in local strongman competitions across Omsk.

== Strongman career ==
Shivlyakov's first international competition was the 2011 Arnold Amateur Strongman World Championships, where he finished in sixth place. The following year, he advanced into second place and finally won the competition in 2013. This victory allowed him to compete in the 2014 Arnold Strongman Classic in Columbus, Ohio, in which he secured seventh place. He pulled 441 kg (972 lb) in the Hummer tyre deadlift event. He also qualified for the 2014 World's Strongest Man but failed to reach the final.

In 2015 Shivlyakov entered the finals of World's Strongest Man after emerging second to Žydrūnas Savickas in the group. He finished in ninth place. The same year, he took part in the World's Strongest Team competition and briefly held the world record in the Northumberland Stone carry before Hafþór Júlíus Björnsson broke it later in the same event.

2016 was a prolific year for Shivlyakov. He placed seventh in both the Arnold Strongman Classic and Arnold Africa, fifth in Arnold Europe, third in Arnold Asia, third in Ultimate Strongman World Championships, third in WSF World Cup India and won WSF World Cup Russia. During the Arnold Strongman Classic, he pressed the 175 kg (386 lb) Slater Log for 6 reps.

In 2017, Shivlyakov secured fifth place in the Arnold Strongman Classic and Giants Live World Tour Finals, fourth place in Arnold South America, second place in Arnold Australia and also got selected to World's Strongest Man.

In 2018, Shivlyakov finished in third place in the Arnold Strongman Classic, behind champion Hafþór Júlíus Björnsson and runner up Brian Shaw. During the competition, he became the fourth person to shoulder the Odd Haugen Tombstone, and to this day remains one of only eight men to ever do it. During the same competition, while deadlifting 426 kg (939 lb) on the Elephant bar, Shivlyakov bled profusely from his nose, earning him significant publicity. Three weeks later, he won the Arnold South America.

In 2019, Shivlyakov narrowly missed the Arnold Strongman Classic podium by 1 point, ending in fourth place. He also managed a fourth place finish at Arnold Australia and Arnold Africa. Shivlyakov also placed fifth in his inaugural Europe's Strongest Man competition, and qualified himself in to World's Strongest Man once again.

In 2020 Shivlyakov won the Força Bruta competition in Brazil and also broke the Masters Strongman deadlift world record with 436 kg (961 lb) at World's Ultimate Strongman feats of strength series.

2021 marked the final year of Shivlyakov's international strongman career with a win at Força Bruta and appearances at the Arnold Strongman Classic, World's Strongest Man, World's Ultimate Strongman, Rogue Invitational and Shaw Classic.

== Personal life ==
Shivlyakov is married and has two daughters. They live in Omsk.

Shivylakov is known for frequently wearing his military beret during competition.

== Personal records ==
- Deadlift (Raw on Elephant bar with straps) – 442 kg (974 lb) (2019 Arnold Strongman Classic)
- Deadlift (Masters (40+) category) – 436 kg (961 lb) (World's Ultimate Strongman) (Feats of Strength series, 2020) (former world record)
- Raw Deadlift – 418 kg (922 lb) (2018 WRPF World Championships, Moscow)

→ The second heaviest powerlifting style raw deadlift ever performed by a Strongman athlete, behind Benedikt Magnússon.
Third is 417.5 kg (920 lb) by Mikhail Koklyaev, fourth is 415 kg (915 lb) by Jerry Pritchett and fifth is 410 kg (904 lb) by Hafþór Júlíus Björnsson

- Squat (single ply equipment) – 370 kg (816 lb) (2008 FPR Siberian Powerlifting Championships, Novorossiysk)
- Bench press (single ply equipment) – 285 kg (628 lb) (2008 FPR Siberian Powerlifting Championships, Krasnoyarsk Krai)
- Log press – 200 kg (441 lb) (2016 Arnold Asia)
- Log press (for reps) – 175 kg (386 lb) x 6 reps (2016 Arnold Strongman Classic)
- Axle press – 180 kg (397 lb) (2018 Giants Live World Tour Finals)
- Cyr Dumbbell press – 124.5 kg (274 lb) (2016 Arnold Strongman Classic)
- Max Atlas Stone for reps – 220 kg (485 lb) × 2 (2019 Arnold Africa)
- Odd Haugen Tombstone to shoulder – 186 kg (410 lb) (2018 Arnold Strongman Classic)
- Northumberland Stone carry – 245 kg (540 lb) for 8.60 metres (28 ft 3 in) (2015 World's Strongest Team) (former world record)
- Keg toss – 8 kegs (20–26 kg (44–57 lb)) over 5.00 metres (16 ft 5 in) in 38.95 seconds (2021 Força Bruta)
- Sandbag over bar – 38.5 kg (85 lb) over 4.57 metres (15 ft 0 in) (2020 Arnold Strongman Classic)
- Thor's Hammer one arm grip lift – 125 kg (275 lb) (2021 Rogue Invitational) (former joint-world record)
- Tractor pull – 18,000 kg (39,683 lb) for 6.1 meters (Minsk, Belarus) (World Record)
- Bus pull – 24,000 kg (52,911 lb) for 2.75 meters (Omsk) (National Record)
- Truck pull – 14,000 kg (30,865 lb) for 15 meters in 22 seconds (Omsk) (National Record)
- Car pull (with teeth) – 2,000 kg (4,409 lb) for 25 meters (Omsk) (National Record)
- Bar bending – 14 x iron rods (each with a 9/20 inch (1.2 cm) diameter) bent within 45 seconds (using top of the head position) (2022 Guinness World Records, Russia) (World Record)

== Other media ==
Shivlyakov was invited to participate in the TV show "Army Shop". Moscow directors sought to cast Shivlyakov in the title role of the feature film "Bogatyr". Shivlyakov also starred in the comedy "Zomboyaschik". The creators of the Time of Heroes comic chose Shivlyakov as a prototype for one of the characters.
