= Mateusz Kieliszkowski =

Polish strongman competitor (born 1993)

Personal information
- Nicknames: Polish Titan; The Terminator
- Born: 12 August 1993 (age 33) Maszewo
- Height: 6 ft 5 in (1.96 m)
- Weight: 150 kg (330 lb)

Sport
- Sport: Strongman
Medal record
Strongman
Representing Poland
World's Strongest Man
7th	2016 World's Strongest Man
6th	2017 World's Strongest Man
2nd	2018 World's Strongest Man
2nd	2019 World's Strongest Man
Qualified	2023 World's Strongest Man
Qualified	2025 World's Strongest Man
Arnold Strongman Classic
3rd	2015 Arnold Strongman Classic
4th	2016 Arnold Strongman Classic
4th	2017 Arnold Strongman Classic
4th	2018 Arnold Strongman Classic
3rd	2019 Arnold Strongman Classic
2nd	2020 Arnold Strongman Classic
2nd	2023 Arnold Strongman Classic
2nd	2024 Arnold Strongman Classic
Rogue Invitational
4th	2021 Rogue Invitational
3rd	2023 Rogue Invitational
World's Ultimate Strongman
3rd	2018 World's Ultimate Strongman
1st	2019 World's Ultimate Strongman
2nd	2021 Dubai
Europe's Strongest Man
4th	2016 Europe's Strongest Man
3rd	2018 Europe's Strongest Man
2nd	2019 Europe's Strongest Man
3rd	2025 Europe's Strongest Man
Giants Live
1st	2018 World Tour Finals
1st	2019 Wembley
1st	2019 World Tour Finals
9th	2025 Strongman Classic
13th	2025 World Tour Finals
Arnold Pro Strongman World Series
1st	2014 Amateur
2nd	2016 Africa
2nd	2016 Europe
5th	2017 Australia
3rd	2017 South America
1st	2017 Africa
2nd	2018 South America
4th	2018 Forts de Warwick
2nd	2019 USA
2nd	2019 South America
2nd	2019 Africa
1st	2019 Europe
Magnús Ver Magnússon Strongman Classic
1st	2024 MVM Strongman Classic
1st	2026 MVM Strongman Classic
Strongman Champions League
1st	2019 SCL Finland
Siberian Power Show
1st	2025 Siberian Power Show
World Strongman Federation
1st	2015 Proform World Cup
Ultimate Strongman
2nd	2017 Summermania
2nd	2017 Viking Apocalypse
2nd	2018 Summermania
Força Bruta
1st	2017 Força Bruta
2nd	2020 Força Bruta
Poland's Strongest Man
1st	2015 Poland's Strongest Man
1st	2016 Poland's Strongest Man
1st	2017 Poland's Strongest Man
1st	2018 Poland's Strongest Man
1st	2019 Poland's Strongest Man

Mateusz Kieliszkowski (born 12 August 1993) is a Polish strongman. He is notable for winning the 2019 World's Ultimate Strongman. He is also a two-time World's Strongest Man runner-up, three-time Arnold Strongman Classic runner-up, one time Europe's Strongest Man runner-up, and five-times Poland's Strongest Man.

Particularly known for his pressing ability and prowess in various stone and moving events, Kieliszkowski is the current world record holder of the Cyr dumbbell press for maximum weight, the 400 kg (882 lb) timber carry farmer's walk (raw grip) for time, the 450 kg (992 lb) car walk for time, the Odd Haugen tombstone to shoulder for reps, and replica Steinstossen strongman events.

He is often described as "arguably the best athlete to have never won World's Strongest Man" by Giants Live.

== Strongman career ==
Kieliszkowski had an interest in strength sports in high school. He then became interested in strongman, specifically, at the age of 17 after taking part in a strongman competition organised by a friend. He achieved his first big success by winning the 2014 Arnold Amateur Strongman World Championships which allowed him to compete in the professional 2015 Arnold Strongman Classic, where he would place 3rd.

In 2016, he would place 4th at both Europe's Strongest Man and the Arnold Strongman Classic. He also qualified for World's Strongest Man for the first time and finished 7th in the final.

In 2017, he would win his first international competition, the Arnold Africa. He would place 4th at the Arnold Strongman Classic and 6th at the World's Strongest Man that year.

In 2018, Kieliszkowski would podium for the first time at World's Strongest Man, finishing 2nd behind Hafþór Júlíus Björnsson. He also came in 4th at the Arnold Strongman Classic that year. He would also win two Giants Live Competitions that year.

In 2019, Kieliszkowski would again finish 2nd at the World's Strongest Man, this time coming behind the champion Martins Licis. He would also finish in 3rd at the Arnold Strongman Classic and 2nd at Europe's Strongest Man.

In March 2020, despite winning four events, Kieliszkowski would finish 2nd at the Arnold Strongman Classic to defending champion Hafþór Júlíus Björnsson. He would miss World's Strongest Man for the next three years due to a triceps injury and complications with the surgery.

In 2021, Kieliszkowski competed at World's Ultimate Strongman and the Rogue Invitational, placing 2nd and 4th, respectively. He would then sit out all of 2022 to heal his injuries.

In March 2023, Kieliszkowski returned to the Arnold Strongman Classic competition after a 3-year absence and finished 2nd to Mitchell Hooper. In April 2023, Mateusz returned to World's Strongest Man for the first time since 2019. However, he struggled with injuries and went out in the group stage for the first time in his career. Mateusz competed at the Rogue Invitational and finished 3rd despite zeroing the first event. Notably, Kieliszkowski was the only athlete to complete the Iron Bull sled pull at the event.

In 2024, Kieliskowski started his strongman season coming 2nd at the Arnold Strongman Classic. However, he did not participate in either the Europe's Strongest Man, the World's Strongest Man or the Strongest Man on Earth competitions due to an Achilles tendon injury. Kieliszkowski returned in November and won the Magnús Ver Magnússon Strongman Classic in Iceland.

In 2025, Kieliszkowski returned to Giants Live for the first time since 2019 and finished 3rd at Europe's Strongest Man.

== Personal records ==
- Deadlift (with suit and straps) – 420 kg (926 lb) (2019 World's Ultimate Strongman)
- Elephant bar Deadlift (raw with straps) – 402 kg (886 lb) (2020 Arnold Strongman Classic)
- Giant Barbell Squat (for reps) – 340 kg (750 lb) × 7 reps (single-ply suit w/ wraps) (2019 World's Strongest Man)
- Log press – 214 kg (472 lb) (2019 Europe's Strongest Man)
- Apollon's Axle press – 181.5 kg (400 lb) x 4 reps (2024 Arnold Strongman Classic)
- Circus dumbbell press – 150 kg (330 lb) (2018 Ultimate Strongman Summermania) (former world record)
- Cyr dumbbell press – 145 kg (320 lb) (2020 Arnold Strongman Classic) (World Record)
- Car Walk – 450 kg (992 lb) for 20m course in 10.00 seconds (2019 Giants Live World Tour Finals) (World Record)
- Timber carry – 400 kg (882 lb) (40-foot inclined ramp) in 7.00 seconds (raw grip) (2020 Arnold Strongman Classic) (World Record)
- Sandbag over bar – 34 kg (75 lb) over 4.57 metres (15 ft 0 in) (2020 Arnold Strongman Classic)
- Max Atlas Stone – 220 kg (485 lb) (2019 Arnold Africa)
- Húsafell Stone carry (around the pen) – 186 kg (410 lb) for 68.00 metres (223 ft 1 in) (2 revolutions) (2024 Magnús Ver Magnússon Classic)
- Dinnie Stones carry (Rogue replicas) – 187.3 kg (413 lb) & 145.6 kg (321 lb) for 9.73 metres (31 ft 11 in) (2024 Arnold Strongman Classic)
- Odd Haugen tombstone to shoulder – 186 kg (410 lb) × 5 reps in 2 minutes and 30 seconds (World Record)
- Natural Stone Block press – 151 kg (333 lb) (2024 Magnus Classic) (World Record)
- Inver Stone press – 136 kg (300 lb) (2020 and 2024 Arnold Strongman Classics) (Joint-World Record)
- Steinstossen (Rogue replica) – 84 kg (185 lb) for 3.47 metres (11 ft 5 in) (2023 Arnold Strongman Classic) (World Record)
- Thor's Hammer one arm grip lift – 125 kg (275 lb) (2021 Rogue Invitational) (former joint-world record)
- Conan's Wheel of Pain – 9,072 kg (20,000 lb) 34.14 meters (112 feet)
- Sled pull (Rogue bull pull) – 453.5 kg (1,000 lb) for 15 meter course in 42.54 seconds (2023 Rogue Invitational) (World Record)
- Firetruck pull – 7,711 kg (17,000 lb) for 10 meter course 'in soil' in 17.91 seconds (2019 Arnold USA) (World Record)
- Truck pull – 23,000 kg (50,706 lb) for 30 meter course 'uphill' in 55.90 seconds (2019 World's Ultimate Strongman) (World Record)
- Plane pull – 26,000 kg (57,320 lb) for 30 meter course in 40.07 seconds (2017 World's Strongest Man) (World Record)
- Bus pull – 28,123 kg (62,001 lb) for 25 meter course in 35.95 seconds (2018 World's Strongest Man) (World Record)

== Competitive record ==
Winning percentage: 26.53%
Podium percentage: 75.51%

	1st	2nd	3rd	Podium	4th	5th	6th	7th	8th	9th	10th	13th	19th	23rd	Total
International competitions	16	17	7	40	6	0	1	1	0	1	0	1	1	1	53

== Filmography ==
=== Television ===
Year	Title	Role	Notes
2016–2019, 2023, 2025	World's Strongest Man	Himself – Competitor	
