= 2025 Europe's Strongest Man =

Strongman competition

Competition information
- Dates: 5 April 2025
- Venue: First Direct Arena
- Location: Leeds
- Country: United Kingdom
- Athletes participating: 12
- Nations participating: 8

Champion(s)
- (United Kingdom) Luke Richardson

The 2025 Europe's Strongest Man was a strongman competition that took place in Leeds, England on 5 April 2025 at the First Direct Arena.

Luke Richardson won the competition to win his second Europe's Strongest Man title.

== Participants ==
- Mateusz Kieliszkowski (POL)
- Ondřej Fojtů (CZE)
- Luke Richardson (UK)
- Luke Stoltman (UK)
- Gavin Bilton (UK)
- Nicolas Cambi (ITA)
- Aivars Šmaukstelis (LAT)
- Pavlo Kordiyaka (UKR)
- Paddy Haynes (UK)
- Pa O'Dwyer (IRL)
- Andrew Flynn (UK)
- Rauno Heinla (EST)

== Results of events ==
=== Event 1: Overhead medley ===
- Weight: 4 implements for 2 repetitions each. 90 kilograms (200 lb) dumbbell, 150 kilograms (330 lb) safe, 150 kilograms (330 lb) axle and a 150 kilograms (330 lb) log
- Time Limit: 1 minute 15 seconds

#	Athlete	Nation	Time	Event Points	Overall Points
1	Mateusz Kieliszkowski	Poland	8 in 1:02.09	12	12
2	Ondřej Fojtů	Czech Republic	8 in 1:04.96	11	11
3	Luke Richardson	United Kingdom	8 in 1:06.10	10	10
4	Luke Stoltman	United Kingdom	6 in 1:00.77	9	9
5	Gavin Bilton	United Kingdom	6 in 1:13.94	8	8
6	Nicolas Cambi	Italy	5 in 38.41	7	7
7	Aivars Šmaukstelis	Latvia	3 in 41.44	6	6
8	Pavlo Kordiyaka	Ukraine	3 in 44.53	5	5
9	Paddy Haynes	United Kingdom	2 in 18.86	4	4
10	Pa O'Dwyer	Ireland	2 in 19.78	3	3
11	Andrew Flynn	United Kingdom	2 in 38.99	2	2
—	Rauno Heinla	Estonia	0 in 1:15.00	0	0

=== Event 2: Shield carry ===
- Weight: 200 kilograms (440 lb) shield for distance

#	Athlete	Nation	Distance	Event Points	Overall Points
1	Paddy Haynes	United Kingdom	89.99 metres (295.2 ft)	12	16
2	Pavlo Kordiyaka	Ukraine	61.84 metres (202.9 ft)	11	16
3	Mateusz Kieliszkowski	Poland	56.82 metres (186.4 ft)	10	22
4	Luke Richardson	United Kingdom	56.10 metres (184.1 ft)	9	19
5	Andrew Flynn	United Kingdom	51.04 metres (167.5 ft)	8	10
6	Ondřej Fojtů	Czech Republic	49.44 metres (162.2 ft)	7	18
7	Luke Stoltman	United Kingdom	47.49 metres (155.8 ft)	6	15
8	Gavin Bilton	United Kingdom	41.12 metres (134.9 ft)	5	13
9	Pa O'Dwyer	Ireland	33.00 metres (108.27 ft)	4	9
10	Rauno Heinla	Estonia	29.49 metres (96.8 ft)	3	3
11	Nicolas Cambi	Italy	26.38 metres (86.5 ft)	2	9
12	Aivars Šmaukstelis	Latvia	23.12 metres (75.9 ft)	1	7

=== Event 3: Carry & drag ===
- Weight: 2 implements for 20 metres (66 ft) each. 125 kilograms (276 lb) anvil carry and a 350 kilograms (770 lb) chain drag
- Course length: 40 metres (130 ft)
- Time Limit: 60 seconds

#	Athlete	Nation	Time	Event Points	Overall Points
1	Luke Richardson	United Kingdom	22.58	11.5	30.5
1	Mateusz Kieliszkowski	Poland	22.58	11.5	31.5
3	Ondřej Fojtů	Czech Republic	25.08	10	28
4	Paddy Haynes	United Kingdom	26.65	9	25
5	Andrew Flynn	United Kingdom	26.89	8	18
6	Pavlo Kordiyaka	Ukraine	27.10	7	23
7	Pa O'Dwyer	Ireland	27.60	6	13
8	Luke Stoltman (Note: Following this event Luke Stoltman withthdrew from the competition due to illness.)	United Kingdom	28.19	5	20
9	Nicolas Cambi	Italy	29.10	4	13
10	Rauno Heinla	Estonia	30.96	3	6
11	Aivars Šmaukstelis	Latvia	31.15	2	9
12	Gavin Bilton	United Kingdom	39.22	1	14

=== Event 4: Deadlift ===
- Weight: 350 kilograms (770 lb)
- Time Limit: 60 seconds

#	Athlete	Nation	Repetitions	Event Points	Overall Points
1	Paddy Haynes	United Kingdom	8	11.5	36.5
1	Rauno Heinla	Estonia	8	11.5	17.5
3	Ondřej Fojtů	Czech Republic	6	10	38
4	Luke Richardson	United Kingdom	5	8.5	39
4	Pa O'Dwyer	Ireland	5	8.5	21.5
6	Pavlo Kordiyaka	Ukraine	4	6.5	29.5
6	Aivars Šmaukstelis	Latvia	4	6.5	15.5
8	Mateusz Kieliszkowski	Poland	3	4	37.5
8	Andrew Flynn	United Kingdom	3	4	22
8	Nicolas Cambi	Italy	3	4	17
11	Gavin Bilton	United Kingdom	1	2	16

=== Event 5: Atlas stones ===
- Weight: 5 stones ranging from 120–200 kilograms (260–440 lb)
- Time Limit: 60 seconds

#	Athlete	Nation	Time	Event Points	Overall Points
1	Luke Richardson	United Kingdom	5 in 25.96	12	51
2	Paddy Haynes	United Kingdom	5 in 26.34	11	47.5
3	Rauno Heinla	Estonia	5 in 28.44	10	27.5
4	Mateusz Kieliszkowski	Poland	4 in 17.03	9	46.5
5	Ondřej Fojtů	Czech Republic	4 in 18.88	8	46
6	Andrew Flynn	United Kingdom	4 in 20.82	7	29
7	Aivars Šmaukstelis	Latvia	4 in 21.73	6	21.5
8	Pavlo Kordiyaka	Ukraine	4 in 22.78	5	34.5
9	Pa O'Dwyer	Ireland	4 in 31.49	4	25.5
10	Nicolas Cambi	Italy	3 in 31.65	3	20
11	Gavin Bilton	United Kingdom	2 in 10.13	2	18

== Final results ==
#	Athlete	Nation	Points
1st place, gold medalist(s)	Luke Richardson	United Kingdom	51
2nd place, silver medalist(s)	Paddy Haynes	United Kingdom	47.5
3rd place, bronze medalist(s)	Mateusz Kieliszkowski	Poland	46.5
4	Ondřej Fojtů	Czech Republic	46
5	Pavlo Kordiyaka	Ukraine	34.5
6	Andrew Flynn	United Kingdom	29
7	Rauno Heinla	Estonia	27.5
8	Pa O'Dwyer	Ireland	25.5
9	Aivars Šmaukstelis	Latvia	21.5
10	Nicolas Cambi	Italy	20
10	Luke Stoltman	United Kingdom	20
12	Gavin Bilton	United Kingdom	18

Preceded by 2024 Europe's Strongest Man	Europe's Strongest Man	Succeeded by 2026 Europe's Strongest Man
