= 2022 World's Strongest Man =

Strongman competition in 2022

Competition information
- Dates: 24–29 May 2022
- Location: Sacramento, California
- Country: United States
- Athletes participating: 30
- Nations participating: 15

Champion(s)
- (United Kingdom) Tom Stoltman

The 2022 World's Strongest Man was the 45th edition of the World's Strongest Man competition, an event that took place in Sacramento, California from May 24 to May 29, 2022. The contest was won by Tom Stoltman with this being his second consecutive title. Joining him on the podium were the 2019 and 2020 World's Strongest Man winners, Martins Licis and Oleksii Novikov respectively, who tied on points. In the event of a draw, the higher placing athlete in the last event, in this case Licis in the Atlas Stones, wins the tie-breaker.

== Participants ==
- Tom Stoltman (United Kingdom)
- Kevin Faires (United States)
- Gabriel Rhéaume (Canada)
- Aivars Šmaukstelis (Latvia)
- Andy Black (United Kingdom)
- Manuel Angulo (Chile)
- Mitchell Hooper (Canada)
- Brian Shaw (United States)
- Gabriel Peña (Mexico)
- Konstantine Janashia (Georgia (country))
- Bobby Thompson (United States)
- Mark Felix (United Kingdom)
- Oleksii Novikov (Ukraine)
- Adam Bishop (United Kingdom)
- Mika Törrö (Finland)
- Trey Mitchell (United States)
- Rob Kearney (United States)
- Grzegorz Szymanski (Poland)
- Martins Licis (United States)
- Maxime Boudreault (Canada)
- Pavlo Kordiyaka (Ukraine)
- Gavin Bilton (United Kingdom)
- Shane Flowers (United Kingdom)
- Nedžmin Ambešković (Bosnia and Herzegovina)
- Luke Stoltman (United Kingdom)
- Kelvin De Ruiter (Netherlands)
- Eyþór Ingólfsson Melsteð (Iceland)
- Jean-Stephen Coraboeuf (France)
- Evan Singleton (United States)
- Kim Ujarak (Greenland)

Manuel Angulo, Nedžmin Ambešković and Kim Ujarak are the first representatives of Chile, Bosnia and Herzegovina, and Greenland in WSM history, respectively. Angulo is also the first South American athlete to compete at WSM.

Before the contest began, two time runner-up Mateusz Kieliszkowski, Peiman Maheripourehir, Rauno Heinla and Pa O’Dwyer were initially contestants before withdrawing.

Graham Hicks, Cheick “Iron Biby” Sanou, four time champion Žydrūnas Savickas, and regular finalist J.F. Caron declined to compete. Hicks declined his invitation as he was not permitted to travel to the United States from the United Kingdom as he was not vaccinated against COVID-19. Caron was unable to compete as he recovered from injuries he sustained at the 2022 Arnold Strongman Classic.

== Heat results ==
=== Format ===
The 30 athletes were divided into 5 groups of 6 athletes, with 2 athletes from each group progressing to the final of 10. The winner of each group progressed to the final, and 2nd and 3rd in each group would then advance to a 'Stone Off', from which the winner would also progress.

=== Events ===
- Loading Race: 5 implements. 1 Minute 15 second time limit.
- Deadlift Ladder: 5 lifts weighing between 300–380 kilograms (660–840 lb). 1 Minute 15 second time limit.
- Car Walk: 430 kilograms (950 lb) down a 20 metres (66 ft) course. 60 second time limit
- Log Lift: 145 kilograms (320 lb). 1 Minute 15 second time limit.
- Wrecking Ball Hold: 228 kilograms (503 lb)

=== Heat 1 ===
#	Name	Event 1 Loading Race	Event 2 Deadlift Ladder	Event 3 Car Walk	Event 4 Log Lift	Event 5 Wrecking Ball Hold	Pts
1	(United Kingdom) Tom Stoltman	1st - 5 in 38.39s	1st - 5 in 51.46s	1st - 14.65s	1st - 8 reps	6th - 4.63s	25
2	(United States) Kevin Faires	2nd - 5 in 43.36s	3rd - 4 in 45.89s	3rd - 19.32s	2nd - 7 reps	1st - 1m 35.18s	24
3	(Canada) Gabriel Rhéaume	5th - 5 in 53.39s	2nd - 4 in 39.40s	2nd - 16.44s	3rd - 6 reps	3rd - 1m 24.10s	20
4	(Latvia) Aivars Šmaukstelis	3rd - 5 in 44.37s	4th - 4 in 55.91s	4th - 19.91s	4th - 4 reps	5th - 57.44s	15
5	(United Kingdom) Andy Black	4th - 5 in 50.81s	5th - 4 in 1m 2.30s	5th - 32.71s	5th - 0 reps	2nd - 1m 26.92s	12
6	(Chile) Manuel Angulo	6th - 4 in 1m 10.64s	6th - 3 in 38.62s	6th - 60.00s	5th - 0 reps	4th - 1m 11.66s	6

Stone Off

Name	Nationality	Stones
Gabriel Rhéaume	Canada	7
Kevin Faires	United States	6

Originally, Ireland's Pa O'Dwyer was supposed to be in this group, but was forced to withdraw due to injury, and was replaced by Scotland's Andy Black. Defending World's Strongest Man Tom Stoltman would dominate this group, winning each of the first 4 events, before simply picking up the wrecking ball to get 1 point, and secure the group win. Canada's Strongest Man and WSM Rookie Gabriel Rhéaume would cause an upset, knocking out former finalist Faires in the stone off, despite Faires being four points clear.

=== Heat 2 ===
#	Name	Event 1 Loading Race	Event 2 Deadlift Ladder	Event 3 Car Walk	Event 4 Log Lift	Event 5 Wrecking Ball Hold	Pts
1	(Canada) Mitchell Hooper	1st - 5 in 38.31s	1st - 5 in 31.21s	1st - 11.64s	2nd - 7 reps	6th - 6.40s	23.5
2	(United States) Bobby Thompson	5th - 5 in 49.70s	2nd - 5 in 42.56s	3rd - 16.05s	1st - 8 reps	2nd - 1m 21.33s	22
3	(United States) Brian Shaw	2nd - 5 in 45.00s	5th - 4 in 32.20s	5th - 19.97s	2nd - 7 reps	3rd - 1m 6.13s	17.5
4	(United Kingdom) Mark Felix	6th - 5 in 54.96s	4th - 4 in 28.64s	2nd - 13.96s	6th - 0 reps	1st - 2m 20.49s	15
5	(Georgia (country)) Konstantine Janashia	4th - 5 in 49.47s	6th - 3 in 19.05s	4th - 18.16s	4th - 5 reps	4th - 1m 1.38s	13
6	(Mexico) Gabriel Peña	3rd - 5 in 45.88s	3rd - 5 in 52.53s	6th - 18.9 metres (62 ft)	5th - 1 rep	5th - 48.27s	13

Stone Off

Name	Nationality	Stones
Brian Shaw	United States	1
Bobby Thompson	United States	0

Considered the group of death when announced, this group featured 4-time World's Strongest Man and 2021 runner up Brian Shaw, 2 more finalists from 2021, Bobby Thompson and Konstantine Janashia, Mark Felix in his record 17th WSM contest, Gabriel Pena, and rookie Mitchell Hooper. Hooper stunned everyone, winning the first 3 events, before placing joint second on the log lift, meaning he needed just 1 point from the wrecking ball hold to secure the group win. In the stone off, Bobby Thompson had some problems with his tacky, and failed to lift the stone once, handing the win, and second qualifying spot to Shaw. It was the first time since 2009 that Shaw failed to win his group at WSM.

=== Heat 3 ===
#	Name	Event 1 Loading Race	Event 2 Deadlift Ladder	Event 3 Car Walk	Event 4 Log Lift	Event 5 Wrecking Ball Hold	Pts
1	(Ukraine) Oleksii Novikov	1st - 5 in 37.25s	1st - 5 in 35.64s	3rd - 15.23s	1st - 9 reps	4th - 1m 38.63s	24.5
2	(United States) Trey Mitchell	4th - 5 in 48.78s	3rd - 5 in 59.00s	4th - 19.24s	1st - 9 reps	1st - 2m 6.46s	21.5
3	(United Kingdom) Adam Bishop	2nd - 5 in 45.85s	2nd - 5 in 37.44s	5th - 23.38s	3rd - 7 reps	5th - 1m 31.35s	18
4	(United States) Rob Kearney	5th - 5 in 54.62s	4th - 4 in 41.28s	1st - 11.63s	4th - 6 reps	6th - 1m 1.95s	15
5	(Finland) Mika Törrö	3rd - 5 in 47.84s	5th - 2 in 26.65s	6th - 9.5 metres (31 ft)	6th - 2 reps	2nd - 1m 53.17s	13
6	(Poland) Grzegorz Szymanski	6th - 4 in 29.85s	6th - 2 in 26.91s	2nd - 14.26s	5th - 3 reps	3rd - 1m 46.49s	13

Stone Off

Name	Nationality	Stones
Trey Mitchell	United States	10
Adam Bishop	United Kingdom	10

This group featured 2020 Champion Oleksii Novikov, 2021 4th place finisher Trey Mitchell, 3-time finalist Adam Bishop, Rob Kearney, rookie Mika Törrö, and Poland's Grzegorz Szymanski, returning to the competition for the first time since 2016, where he made the final. In what was the best performing group across all events, Novikov came out on top, returning to the final after missing the 2021 final. Trey Mitchell won the stone off against Adam Bishop.

=== Heat 4 ===
#	Name	Event 1 Loading Race	Event 2 Deadlift Ladder	Event 3 Car Walk	Event 4 Log Lift	Event 5 Wrecking Ball Hold	Pts
1	(United States) Martins Licis	1st - 5 in 37.73s	1st - 5 in 43.59s	2nd - 18.93s	2nd - 9 reps	3rd - 1m 25.63s	25.5
2	(Canada) Maxime Boudreault	2nd - 5 in 40.68s	4th - 3 in 21.12s	4th - 49.28s	1st - 10 reps	1st - 1m 33.93s	23
3	(Ukraine) Pavlo Kordiyaka	3rd - 5 in 43.70s	5th - 3 in 38.50s	1st - 12.92s	2nd - 9 reps	2nd - 1m 31.33s	21.5
4	(United Kingdom) Gavin Bilton	4th - 5 in 45.76s	2nd - 5 in 52.28s	3rd - 23.67s	4th - 7 reps	5th - 1m 7.15s	17
5	(Bosnia and Herzegovina) Nedžmin Ambešković	6th - 1 in 10.20s	6th - 3 in 45.45s	5th - 13.6 metres (45 ft)	5th - 2 reps	4th - 1m 12.47s	9
6	(United Kingdom) Shane Flowers	5th - 5 in 48.70s	3rd - 4 in 36.69s	Withdrew	Withdrew	Withdrew	6

Stone Off

Name	Nationality	Stones
Maxime Boudreault	Canada	10
Pavlo Kordiyaka	Ukraine	10

This group featured 2019 champion Martins Licis, 2021 podium finisher Maxime Boudreault, 2 time UK's Strongest Man Gavin Bilton, and 3 rookies. Unfortunately, Shane Flowers was forced to withdraw after 2 events due to injury. Licis would come out on top, with Boudreault coming through on the stones for the second year running.

=== Heat 5 ===
#	Name	Event 1 Loading Race	Event 2 Deadlift Ladder	Event 3 Car Walk	Event 4 Log Lift	Event 5 Wrecking Ball Hold	Pts
1	(United Kingdom) Luke Stoltman	1st - 5 in 37.95s	1st - 4 in 42.87s	2nd - 16.65s	1st - 10 reps	6th - Did not attempt	23
2	(Iceland) Eyþór Ingólfsson Melsteð	3rd - 5 in 49.69s	4th - 3 in 40.88s	3rd - 29.07s	2nd - 8 reps	3rd - 1m 3.42s	20
3	(France) Jean-Stephen Coraboeuf	4th - 5 in 52.70s	2nd - 4 in 53.87s	4th - 41.34s	3rd - 7 reps	4th - 1m 0.70s	18
4	(Netherlands) Kelvin De Ruiter	2nd - 5 in 39.18s	5th - 3 in 56.44s	5th - 60.00s	5th - 1 rep	1st - 1m 45.65s	16.5
5	(United States) Evan Singleton	5th - 5 in 1m 8.38s	6th - Did not attempt	1st - 9.86s	5th - 1 rep	2nd - 1m 40.34s	14.5
6	(Greenland) Kim Ujarak Lorentzen	6th - 4 in 34.79s	3rd - 4 in 56.48s	6th - 11.4 metres (37 ft)	4th - 6 reps	5th - 36.24s	11

Stone Off

Name	Nationality	Stones
Eyþór Ingólfsson Melsteð	Iceland	5
Jean-Stephen Coraboeuf	France	5

The only group without a former champion, it featured Evan Singleton and Luke Stoltman, both of whom had won 2 Giants Live events in 2021, as well as 2021 finalist Eyþór Ingólfsson Melsteð, and 3 rookies. Unfortunately for Singleton, he went into anaphylactic shock during the loading race, and was forced to miss the deadlift. This put him in an almost irrecoverable position going into day 2 of the heats, and despite winning the car walk, was unable to make the stone off. Stoltman would win the group with an event to spare, and Melsteð would get through on the stones to make a second straight final.

== Finals events results ==
=== Event 1: KNAACK Giant's Medley ===
- Weight: 2 x 125 kilograms (276 lb) boxes, 455 kilograms (1,003 lb) yoke carry
- Course Length: 10 metres (33 ft) each

#	Name	Nationality	Time (sec)	Event Pts	Overall Pts
1	Mitchell Hooper	Canada	21.96	10	10
2	Tom Stoltman	United Kingdom	24.75	9	9
3	Oleksii Novikov	Ukraine	24.84	8	8
4	Luke Stoltman	United Kingdom	28.72	7	7
5	Martins Licis	United States	30.60	6	6
6	Brian Shaw	United States	30.78	5	5
7	Trey Mitchell	United States	32.54	4	4
8	Gabriel Rhéaume	Canada	33.87	3	3
9	Maxime Boudreault	Canada	34.11	2	2
10	Eyþór Ingólfsson Melsteð	Iceland	37.61	1	1

=== Event 2: Car Deadlift ===
- Weight: 360 kilograms (790 lb) for repetitions
- Time Limit: 60 seconds

#	Name	Nationality	Repetitions	Event Pts	Overall Pts
1	Oleksii Novikov	Ukraine	15	10	18
2	Tom Stoltman	United Kingdom	13	8.5	17.5
2	Trey Mitchell	United States	13	8.5	12.5
4	Martins Licis	United States	12	6	12
4	Brian Shaw	United States	12	6	11
4	Mitchell Hooper	Canada	12	6	16
7	Maxime Boudreault	Canada	10	4	6
8	Luke Stoltman	United Kingdom	9	3	10
9	Gabriel Rhéaume	Canada	8	1.5	4.5
9	Eyþór Ingólfsson Melsteð	Iceland	8	1.5	2.5

=== Event 3: Max Flintstone Lift ===
- Opening Weight: 175 kilograms (386 lb)

#	Name	Nationality	Weight Lifted	Event Pts	Overall Pts
1	Oleksii Novikov (Note: With a lift of 246 kilograms (542 lb) Oleksii Novikov set a new world record in the flinstone lift.)	Ukraine	246 kilograms (542 lb)	10	28
2	Tom Stoltman	United Kingdom	240 kilograms (530 lb)	9	26.5
3	Martins Licis	United States	235 kilograms (518 lb)	8	20
4	Brian Shaw	United States	212 kilograms (467 lb)	5.5	16.5
4	Trey Mitchell	United States	212 kilograms (467 lb)	5.5	18
4	Maxime Boudreault	Canada	212 kilograms (467 lb)	5.5	11.5
4	Luke Stoltman	United Kingdom	212 kilograms (467 lb)	5.5	15.5
8	Mitchell Hooper	Canada	200 kilograms (440 lb)	3	19
9	Eyþór Ingólfsson Melsteð	Iceland	190 kilograms (420 lb)	1.5	4
9	Gabriel Rhéaume	Canada	190 kilograms (420 lb)	1.5	6

=== Event 4: Bus Pull ===
- Weight: 18,500 kilograms (40,800 lb)
- Course Length: 30 metres (98 ft)
- Time Limit: 1 Minute 15 seconds

#	Name	Nationality	Time	Event Pts	Overall Pts
1	Oleksii Novikov	Ukraine	0m 41.51	10	38
2	Martins Licis	United States	0m 42.18	9	29
3	Tom Stoltman	United Kingdom	0m 44.50	8	34.5
4	Brian Shaw	United States	0m 44.69	7	23.5
5	Trey Mitchell	United States	0m 45.72	6	24
6	Luke Stoltman	United Kingdom	0m 47.00	5	20.5
7	Maxime Boudreault	Canada	0m 47.20	4	15.5
8	Mitchell Hooper	Canada	0m 49.24	3	22
9	Eyþór Ingólfsson Melsteð	Iceland	0m 51.32	2	6
10	Gabriel Rhéaume	Canada	0m 53.22	1	7

=== Event 5: REIGN Power Stairs ===
- Weight: 3 x 226 kilograms (498 lb)
- Course Length: 3 steps each
- Time Limit: 1 Minute 15 seconds

#	Name	Nationality	Time	Event Pts	Overall Pts
1	Maxime Boudreault	Canada	9 in 0m 39.07	10	25.5
2	Tom Stoltman	United Kingdom	9 in 0m 41.04	9	43.5
3	Martins Licis	United States	9 in 0m 44.56	8	37
4	Brian Shaw	United States	8 in 1m 09.03	7	30.5
5	Mitchell Hooper	Canada	7 in 0m 32.36	6	28
6	Luke Stoltman	United Kingdom	7 in 0m 59.47	5	25.5
7	Oleksii Novikov	Ukraine	6 in 0m 34.20	4	42
8	Eyþór Ingólfsson Melsteð	Iceland	6 in 0m 35.78	3	9
9	Trey Mitchell	United States	6 in 1m 10.22	2	26
10	Gabriel Rhéaume	Canada	5 in 0m 35.78	1	8

=== Event 6: Atlas Stones ===
- Weight: 5 stones ranging from 140–200 kilograms (310–440 lb)
- Time Limit: 60 seconds

#	Name	Nationality	Time	Event Pts	Overall Pts
1	Tom Stoltman	United Kingdom	5 in 0m 25.76	10	53.5
2	Maxime Boudreault	Canada	5 in 0m 28.04	9	34.5
3	Trey Mitchell	United States	5 in 0m 33.06	8	34
4	Brian Shaw	United States	5 in 0m 39.29	7	37.5
5	Martins Licis	United States	5 in 0m 45.74	6	43
6	Luke Stoltman	United Kingdom	4 in 0m 25.78	5	30.5
7	Eyþór Ingólfsson Melsteð	Iceland	4 in 0m 28.87	4	13
8	Gabriel Rhéaume	Canada	4 in 0m 33.55	3	11
9	Mitchell Hooper	Canada	4 in 0m 33.78	2	30
10	Oleksii Novikov	Ukraine	4 in 0m 36.70	1	43

== Final standings ==
#	Name	Nationality	Pts
1st place, gold medalist(s)	Tom Stoltman	United Kingdom	53.5
2nd place, silver medalist(s)	Martins Licis	United States	43
3rd place, bronze medalist(s)	Oleksii Novikov	Ukraine	43
4	Brian Shaw	United States	37.5
5	Maxime Boudreault	Canada	34.5
6	Trey Mitchell	United States	34
7	Luke Stoltman	United Kingdom	30.5
8	Mitchell Hooper	Canada	30
9	Eyþór Ingólfsson Melsteð	Iceland	13
10	Gabriel Rhéaume	Canada	11

== Controversy ==
A day prior to the competition, former director for World's Ultimate Strongman, Mark Boyd, leaked a secretly recorded portion of a conversation with Luke Stoltman, brother of the eventual champion of the competition Tom Stoltman, in which he stated "... and here's the sneaky bit, so Colin's (Colin Bryce, director of Giants Live who assists in the running of the World's Strongest Man) gonna, not promised, but he says we will get more favorable groups, events, etc. in Worlds if we kinda play ball and then he can help push the Stoltman brand; if that makes sense in the Giant's Live, so basically what he did for Eddie (Eddie Hall)..." The audio was released shortly after the groups for the competition were announced, with some fans speculating on the level of difficulty of the Stoltmans' groups compared to others. Boyd has since deleted this video from his Instagram account. Prior to deletion however, he claims to have given several months for athletes to expose the corruption on their own, indicating that he also had contacted IGM directors to no avail.

Stoltman released his own response video on YouTube later that day, in which he states that the clip was taken out of context, with the conversation being 90 minutes long, and explains that he simply told Boyd what he wanted to hear because he did not want to take part in Boyd's upcoming competition. Many took issue with Boyd's leaking of the conversation so closely to the World's Strongest Man competition date, leading to Boyd and Core Sports parting ways a few days later, with the company releasing a message stating they were not in support of Boyd's actions.

IGM, the World's Strongest Man, and Colin Bryce have yet to respond to the controversy.

Preceded by 2021 World's Strongest Man	2022 World's Strongest Man	Succeeded by 2023 World's Strongest Man
