= 2023 World's Strongest Man =

Strongman competition in 2023

Competition information
- Dates: 19–23 April 2023
- Venue: Burroughs and Chapin Pavilion Place
- Location: Myrtle Beach, South Carolina
- Country: United States
- Athletes participating: 30
- Nations participating: 14

Champion(s)
- (Canada) Mitchell Hooper

The 2023 World's Strongest Man was the 46th World's Strongest Man competition which took place in Myrtle Beach, South Carolina from 19 to 23 April. The contest was won by Mitchell Hooper of Barrie, Ontario making him the first Canadian champion. Defending champion Tom Stoltman placed second, and Oleksii Novikov placed third.

== Participants ==
- Pavlo Kordiyaka (UKR)
- Tom Stoltman (UK)
- Bobby Thompson (USA)
- Konstantine Janashia (GEO)
- Pa O'Dwyer (IRL)
- Eddie Williams (AUS)
- Oleksii Novikov (UKR)
- Luke Stoltman (UK)
- Gavin Bilton (UK)
- Thomas Evans (USA)
- Kristján Jón Haraldsson (ISL)
- Fadi El Masri (LBN)
- Mitchell Hooper (CAN)
- Mathew Ragg (NZL)
- Aivars Šmaukstelis (LAT)
- Mateusz Kieliszkowski (POL)
- Graham Hicks (UK)
- Spenser Remick (USA)
- Jaco Schoonwinkel (RSA)
- Brian Shaw (USA)
- Rauno Heinla (EST)
- Adam Bishop (UK)
- Kevin Faires (USA)
- Gabriel Rhéaume (CAN)
- Trey Mitchell (USA)
- Evan Singleton (USA)
- Eyþór Ingólfsson Melsteð (ISL)
- Mark Felix (UK)
- Paul Smith (UK)
- Jean-Stephen Coraboeuf (FRA)

Originally, Pavlo Nakonechnyy of Ukraine and Cheick Sanou (Iron Biby) of Burkina Faso were set to compete in this competition, but both withdrew through injuries, being replaced by reserves Thomas Evans and Kristján Jón Haraldsson, respectively. 2022 runner-up and 2019 champion Martins Licis elected not to compete this year, taking a year out of competition, and Maxime Boudreault, a finalist in the previous two WSM contests, was forced to withdraw with an injury from earlier in the year.

This year's competition featured six rookies, with Thomas Evans, Kristján Jón Haraldsson, Fadi El Masri, Mathew Ragg, Spenser Remick and Jaco Schoonwinkel all making their first appearances at the competition. Ragg and Schoonwinkel went on to make the final in their first WSM competition, with Ragg becoming the first New Zealander to qualify for the final since 1983, before the introduction of the groups. El Masri became the first man to represent Lebanon at WSM.

Prior to the competition, both Mark Felix and four-time champion Brian Shaw announced that the 2023 WSM would be their final WSM contest. Felix would be eliminated in the group stage, and Shaw went on to make the final in his last WSM.

Rauno Heinla returned to WSM for the first time since 2011, ultimately taking 3rd place in his group. Two-time runner-up Mateusz Kieliszkowski made a much anticipated return to WSM for the first time since 2019, but went out in the group stage for the first time in his career.

== Heat results ==
=== Format ===
The 30 athletes were divided into 5 groups of 6 athletes, with 2 athletes from each group progressing to the final of 10. The winner of each group progressed to the final, and 2nd and 3rd in each group would then advance to a 'Stone Off', from which the winner would also progress.

=== Events ===
- Loading Race: 5 implements. One-minute-15-second time limit.
- Deadlift Machine: 7 lifts ranging from 290.3–385.5 kilograms (640–850 lb), once the seventh lift is completed the final weight was lifted for max repetitions. One-minute-15-second time limit.
- Conan's Wheel: 200 kilograms (440 lb)
- Log Ladder: 5 logs weighing 124.8 kilograms (275 lb), 140 kilograms (310 lb), 158.8 kilograms (350 lb), 170.1 kilograms (375 lb), 181.4 kilograms (400 lb). One-minute-15-second time limit.
- Kettlebell Toss: 7 kettlebells over a 4.57-metre (15.0 ft) bar. Sixty-second time limit.

=== Heat 1 ===
#	Athlete	Event 1 Loading race	Event 2 Deadlift	Event 3 Log Ladder	Event 4 Conan's Wheel	Event 5 Kettlebell toss	Pts
1	(Ukraine) Pavlo Kordiyaka	1st – 5 in 41.38s	4th – 5 reps	2nd – 5 in 46.00s	1st – 742 °	1st – 6 in 18.09s	25
2	(United Kingdom) Tom Stoltman	2nd – 5 in 43.84s	2nd – 6 reps	1st – 5 in 41.56s	6th – 598 °	3rd – 6 in 21.99s	20.5
3	(United States) Bobby Thompson	3rd – 5 in 56.56s	1st – 7 reps	3rd – 4 in 25.83s	3rd – 649 °	5th – 6 in 35.67s	20
4	(Georgia (country)) Konstantine Janashia	4th – 5 in 1m 1.10s	2nd – 6 reps	5th – 4 in 1m 8.35s	4th – 633 °	2nd – 6 in 19.93s	17.5
5	(Republic of Ireland) Pa O'Dwyer	5th – 5 in 1m 5.89s	4th – 5 reps	6th – 3 in 25.80s	2nd – 722 °	4th – 6 in 31.71s	13
6	(Australia) Eddie Williams	6th – 5 in 1m 6.44s	4th – 5 reps	4th – 4 in 55.89s	5th – 614 °	6th – 6 in 36.40s	9

Stone Off

Athlete	Nation	Stones
Tom Stoltman	United Kingdom	3
Bobby Thompson	United States	3

=== Heat 2 ===
#	Athlete	Event 1 Loading race	Event 2 Deadlift	Event 3 Log Ladder	Event 4 Conan's Wheel	Event 5 Kettlebell toss	Pts
1	(Ukraine) Oleksii Novikov	1st – 5 in 52.15s	1st – 6 reps	3rd – 4 in 32.50 s	1st – 897 °	6th – 1 in 9.56s	23
2	(United Kingdom) Luke Stoltman	4th – 5 in 1m 2.78s	2nd – 5 reps	2nd – 5 in 52.76s	3rd – 545 °	2nd – 6 in 49.35s	21
3	(United Kingdom) Gavin Bilton	5th – 5 in 1m 3.01s	2nd – 5 reps	4th – 4 in 56.84s	2nd – 557 °	1st – 6 in 19.90s	20
4	(United States) Thomas Evans	3rd – 5 in 57.40 s	2nd – 5 reps	1st – 5 in 38.96s	6th – 69 °	4th – 5 in 28.68s	18
5	(Iceland) Kristján Jón Haraldsson	2nd – 5 in 54.18 s	3rd – 4 reps	5th – 2 in 16.28s	4th – 524 °	3rd – 5 in 15.57s	15.5
6	(Lebanon) Fadi El Masri	6th – 4 in 49.57 s	3rd – 4 reps	6th – 2 in 17.43s	5th – 70 °	5th – 4 in 20.61s	7.5

Stone Off

Athlete	Nation	Stones
Luke Stoltman	United Kingdom	7
Gavin Bilton	United Kingdom	7

=== Heat 3 ===
#	Athlete	Event 1 Loading race	Event 2 Deadlift	Event 3 Log Ladder	Event 4 Conan's Wheel	Event 5 Kettlebell toss	Pts
1	(Canada) Mitchell Hooper	1st – 5 in 42.05s	1st – 8 reps	1st – 5 in 39.51s	1st – 636 °	2nd – 6 in 17.18s	29
2	(New Zealand) Mathew Ragg	3rd – 5 in 58.72s	2nd – 7 reps	2nd – 5 in 56.84s	2nd – 628 °	3rd – 6 in 21.96s	22.5
3	(Latvia) Aivars Šmaukstelis	2nd – 5 in 52.71s	4th – 5 reps	4th – 4 in 30.44s	3rd – 575 °	4th – 6 in 25.41s	17.5
4	(Poland) Mateusz Kieliszkowski	5th – 5 in 1m 7.53s	6th – 4 reps	5th – 4 in 33.24s	4th – 538 °	1st – 7 in 32.44s	14
5	(United Kingdom) Graham Hicks	6th – 4 in 53.40s	2nd – 7 reps	3rd – 4 in 28.31s	6th – 425 °	6th – 4 in 20.51s	11.5
6	(United States) Spenser Remick	4th – 5 in 1m 7.15s	4th – 5 reps	6th – 4 in 38.79s	5th – 470 °	5th – 5 in 24.31s	10.5

Stone Off

Athlete	Nation	Stones
Mathew Ragg	New Zealand	8
Aivars Šmaukstelis	Latvia	8

=== Heat 4 ===
#	Athlete	Event 1 Loading race	Event 2 Deadlift	Event 3 Log Ladder	Event 4 Conan's Wheel	Event 5 Kettlebell toss	Pts
1	(South Africa) Jaco Schoonwinkel	1st – 5 in 47.10s	4th – 6 reps	2nd – 4 in 34.77s	1st – 713 °	3rd – 6 in 47.32s	24
2	(United States) Brian Shaw	3rd 5 in 53.70s	1st – 8 reps	1st – 4 in 33.99s	5th – 411 °	1st – 7 in 48.45s	23.5
3	(Estonia) Rauno Heinla	2nd – 5 in 51.41s	1st – 8 reps	3rd – 3 in 21.60s	3rd – 572 °	5th – 5 in 44.51s	20.5
4	(United Kingdom) Adam Bishop	4th – 4 in 43.12s	3rd – 7 reps	6th – 3 in 33.25s	6th – 292 °	2nd – 6 in 32.29s	14
5	(United States) Kevin Faires	6th – 3 in 1m 5.30s	5th – 5 reps	4th – 3 in 28.93s	2nd – 636 °	4th – 5 in 34.09s	13.5
6	(Canada) Gabriel Rhéaume	5th – 4 in 51.03s	5th – 5 reps	5th – 3 in 32.96s	4th – 476 °	6th – 3 in 14.00s	9.5

Stone Off

Athlete	Nation	Stones
Brian Shaw	United States	11
Rauno Heinla	Estonia	11

=== Heat 5 ===
#	Athlete	Event 1 Loading race	Event 2 Deadlift	Event 3 Log Ladder	Event 4 Conan's Wheel	Event 5 Kettlebell toss	Pts
1	(United States) Trey Mitchell	3rd – 5 in 1m 6.64s	1st – 8 reps	1st – 5 in 39.44s	3rd – 523 °	1st – 7 in 34.42s	26
2	(United States) Evan Singleton	1st – 5 in 46.90s	2nd – 6 reps	2nd – 4 in 35.48s	2nd – 589 °	3rd – 6 in 28.81s	24.5
3	(Iceland) Eyþór Ingólfsson Melsteð	2nd – 5 in 56.41s	4th – 5 reps	3rd – 4 in 39.93s	1st – 629 °	2nd – 6 in 27.66s	22.5
4	(United Kingdom) Mark Felix	5th – 4 in 54.32s	2nd – 6 reps	6th – 1 in 7.58s	5th – 470 °	4th – 4 in 42.66s	12.5
5	(United Kingdom) Paul Smith	4th – 4 in 44.79s	6th – 4 reps	4th – 4 in 45.84s	4th – 518 °	6th – 1 in 28.62s	11
6	(France) Jean-Stephen Coraboeuf	6th – 3 in 40.63s	4th – 5 reps	5th – 3 in 22.34s	6th – 143 °	5th – 2 in 23.65s	8.5

Stone Off

Athlete	Nation	Stones
Evan Singleton	United States	8
Eyþór Ingólfsson Melsteð	Iceland	8

== Finals events results ==
=== Event 1: Shield Carry ===
- Weight: 190 kilograms (420 lb) for distance

#	Athlete	Nation	Distance	Event points	Overall points
1	Mitchell Hooper	Canada	64.80 metres (212.6 ft)	10	10
2	Tom Stoltman	United Kingdom	63.15 metres (207.2 ft)	9	9
3	Oleksii Novikov	Ukraine	55.87 metres (183.3 ft)	8	8
4	Trey Mitchell	United States	50.83 metres (166.8 ft)	7	7
5	Evan Singleton	United States	48.30 metres (158.5 ft)	6	6
6	Pavlo Kordiyaka (Note: Pavlo Kordiyaka did not cross the line during the turn after his second length of the course and was issued a 19.8-metre penalty. Had the penalty not been issued, Kordiyaka would have been the event winner.)	Ukraine	46.59 metres (152.9 ft)	5	5
7	Luke Stoltman	United Kingdom	44.62 metres (146.4 ft)	4	4
8	Brian Shaw	United States	39.10 metres (128.3 ft)	3	3
9	Mathew Ragg	New Zealand	37.65 metres (123.5 ft)	2	2
10	Jaco Schoonwinkel	South Africa	15.92 metres (52.2 ft)	1	1

=== Event 2: Deadlift ===
- Weight: 353 kilograms (778 lb) for repetitions
- Time limit: 60 seconds

#	Athlete	Nation	Repetitions	Event points	Overall points
1	Mitchell Hooper	Canada	8	10	20
2	Oleksii Novikov	Ukraine	7	7.5	15.5
2	Trey Mitchell	United States	7	7.5	14.5
2	Brian Shaw	United States	7	7.5	10.5
2	Mathew Ragg	New Zealand	7	7.5	9.5
6	Tom Stoltman	United Kingdom	6	5	14
7	Evan Singleton	United States	5	3.5	9.5
7	Jaco Schoonwinkel	South Africa	5	3.5	4.5
9	Pavlo Kordiyaka	Ukraine	4	2	7
10	Luke Stoltman	United Kingdom	3	1	5

=== Event 3: Fingal's Fingers ===
- Weight: 5 implements ranging from 145–172 kilograms (320–379 lb)
- Time limit: 60 seconds

#	Athlete	Nation	Time (sec)	Event points	Overall points
1	Tom Stoltman	United Kingdom	5 in 39.36	10	24
2	Oleksii Novikov	Ukraine	5 in 42.26	9	24.5
3	Trey Mitchell	United States	5 in 48.46	8	22.5
4	Pavlo Kordiyaka	Ukraine	5 in 48.69	7	14
5	Evan Singleton	United States	5 in 49.85	6	15.5
6	Mitchell Hooper	Canada	5 in 49.89	5	25
7	Brian Shaw	United States	4 in 26.61	4	14.5
8	Luke Stoltman	United Kingdom	4 in 32.54	3	8
9	Mathew Ragg	New Zealand	4 in 35.03	2	11.5
10	Jaco Schoonwinkel (Note: After this event Jaco Schoonwinkel withdrew from the competition and took no further part.)	South Africa	4 in 40.76	1	5.5

=== Event 4: Max Dumbbell ===
- Opening weight: 115 kilograms (254 lb)

#	Athlete	Nation	Weight	Event points	Overall points
1	Evan Singleton	United States	140 kilograms (310 lb)	9.5	25
1	Mitchell Hooper	Canada	140 kilograms (310 lb)	9.5	34.5
3	Tom Stoltman	United Kingdom	132 kilograms (291 lb)	6.5	30.5
3	Oleksii Novikov	Ukraine	132 kilograms (291 lb)	6.5	31
3	Pavlo Kordiyaka	Ukraine	132 kilograms (291 lb)	6.5	20.5
3	Luke Stoltman	United Kingdom	132 kilograms (291 lb)	6.5	14.5
7	Trey Mitchell	United States	125 kilograms (276 lb)	3	25.5
7	Brian Shaw	United States	125 kilograms (276 lb)	3	17.5
7	Mathew Ragg	New Zealand	125 kilograms (276 lb)	3	14.5

=== Event 5: Bus Pull ===
- Weight: 23,000 kilograms (51,000 lb)
- Course length: 25 metres (82 ft)
- Time limit: 60 seconds

#	Athlete	Nation	Time (sec)	Event points	Overall points
1	Mitchell Hooper	Canada	30.24	10	44.5
2	Tom Stoltman	United Kingdom	32.27	8.5	39
2	Evan Singleton	United States	32.27	8.5	33.5
4	Pavlo Kordiyaka	Ukraine	32.46	7	27.5
5	Trey Mitchell	United States	32.49	6	31.5
6	Brian Shaw	United States	32.65	5	22.5
7	Luke Stoltman	United Kingdom	32.83	4	18.5
8	Oleksii Novikov	Ukraine	33.35	3	34
9	Mathew Ragg	New Zealand	36.29	2	16.5

=== Event 6: Atlas Stones ===
- Weight: 5 stones ranging from 150–210 kilograms (330–460 lb)
- Time limit: 60 seconds

#	Athlete	Nation	Time (sec)	Event points	Overall points
1	Tom Stoltman	United Kingdom	5 in 33.26	10	49
2	Mitchell Hooper	Canada	5 in 36.96	9	53.5
3	Trey Mitchell	United States	5 in 45.72	8	39.5
4	Oleksii Novikov	Ukraine	4 in 27.43	7	41
5	Evan Singleton	United States	4 in 28.16	6	39.5
6	Brian Shaw	United States	4 in 35.88	5	27.5
7	Pavlo Kordiyaka	Ukraine	4 in 45.86	4	31.5
8	Luke Stoltman	United Kingdom	4 in 48.49	3	21.5
9	Mathew Ragg	New Zealand	4 in 49.50	2	18.5

== Final standings ==
#	Athlete	Nation	Points
1st place, gold medalist(s)	Mitchell Hooper	Canada	53.5
2nd place, silver medalist(s)	Tom Stoltman	United Kingdom	49
3rd place, bronze medalist(s)	Oleksii Novikov	Ukraine	41
4	Trey Mitchell	United States	39.5
5	Evan Singleton	United States	39.5
6	Pavlo Kordiyaka	Ukraine	31.5
7	Brian Shaw	United States	27.5
8	Luke Stoltman	United Kingdom	21.5
9	Mathew Ragg	New Zealand	18.5
10	Jaco Schoonwinkel	South Africa	5.5 (Injured)

== Records ==
Mark Felix competed in his 18th World's Strongest Man competition, breaking his own record. He also became the oldest athlete to compete at the World's Strongest Man, being 57 years and 2 days old when the group stages concluded (and he was eliminated from the contest), breaking the record previously held by Odd Haugen.

Brian Shaw broke his own records for most WSM finals (15), most consecutive WSM finals (also 15), and most consecutive WSM contests (16). He also became the second man after Felix to compete in 16 WSMs. On top of this, by winning the kettlebell throw in his group, he won a record 62nd event at WSM (across both the group stages and the finals).

Rauno Heinla competed at WSM for the first time since 2011, breaking the previous record for longest absence from WSM held by Travis Ortmayer, setting a new record of 12 years.

Preceded by 2022 World's Strongest Man	2023 World's Strongest Man	Succeeded by 2024 World's Strongest Man
