= 2023 Shaw Classic =

Strongman competition

Competition information
- Dates: 19–20 August 2023
- Venue: Budweiser Events Center
- Location: Loveland, Colorado
- Country: United States
- Athletes participating: 14
- Nations participating: 5

Champion(s)
- (United States) Brian Shaw

The 2023 Shaw Classic was the 4th edition of the Shaw Classic strongman competition which took place in Loveland, Colorado from 19 to 20 August 2023 at the Budweiser Events Center. The competition included separate professional men's, open men's and open women's categories. This would also be the last event of four times World's Strongest Man and organiser of the competition Brian Shaw's career. The winner of the professional men's category was given the title of The Strongest Man on Earth after Brian acquired the trademark for the phrase from Paul Ohl, the organiser of the now defunct Fortissimus strongman competition.

Brian would end up winning the event with recently crowned World's Strongest Man Mitchell Hooper coming in second and two times World's Strongest Man Tom Stoltman rounding out the podium.

== Participants ==
=== Professional Men (Strongest Man on Earth) ===
- Tom Stoltman (UK)
- Evan Singleton (USA)
- Aivars Šmaukstelis (LAT)
- Maxime Boudreault (CAN)
- Brian Shaw (USA)
- Mitchell Hooper (CAN)
- Thomas Evans (USA)
- Trey Mitchell (USA)
- Bobby Thompson (USA)
- Evan Singleton (USA)
- Luke Stoltman (UK)
- Gavin Bilton (UK)
- Oleksii Novikov (UKR)
- Adam Bishop (UK)

=== Open Men ===
- Joey Lavallée (CAN)
- Wesley Derwinsky (CAN)
- Bryce Johnson (USA)
- Brett Thompson (USA)
- Nathan Goltry (USA)
- Tim Buck (USA)
- Austin Andrade (USA)
- Tristain Hoath (CAN)
- Alexander Kopp (USA)
- Zach Price (USA)
- Nicholas Guardione (USA)
- Josh Spurgeon (USA)
- Josh Gregory (USA)
- James Jeffers (CAN)
- Donald Treglia (USA)

=== Open Women ===
- Melissa Peacock (CAN)
- Olga Liashchuk (UKR)
- Samantha Belliveau (CAN)
- Jackie Osczevski (CAN)
- Austyn Grubb (USA)
- Rebecca Houston (USA)
- Jackie Rhodes (USA)
- Cori Butler (USA)
- Jess Trumbull (USA)
- Morgan Irons (USA)
- Stephanie Bisignano (CAN)
- Joscelyne O'Brien (CAN)
- Laura de Berdt Romilly (CAN)
- Angela Highfield (USA)

== Professional Men's Events Results ==
=== Event 1: Log Medley ===
Athletes had the choice of 3 logs to lift, with heavier logs being worth more points. They then had a set amount of time to attempt as many repetitions as possible. If athletes did the same amount of repetitions on the same weight log, they would then be scored on the time taken to do the repetitions.

- Weight: 172 kilograms (379 lb), 186 kilograms (410 lb), 200 kilograms (440 lb)

| # | Athlete | Nation | Repetitions | Event Points | Overall Points |
|---|---|---|---|---|---|
| 1 | Trey Mitchell | United States | 2 reps (200 kilograms (440 lb) log) | 14 | 14 |
| 2 | Bobby Thompson | United States | 2 reps (200 kilograms (440 lb) log) | 13 | 13 |
| 3 | Mitchell Hooper | Canada | 2 reps (200 kilograms (440 lb) log) | 12 | 12 |
| 4 | Brian Shaw | United States | 2 reps (186 kilograms (410 lb) log) | 11 | 11 |
| 5 | Thomas Evans | United States | 2 reps (186 kilograms (410 lb) log) | 10 | 10 |
| 6 | Evan Singleton | United States | 1 rep (186 kilograms (410 lb) log) | 9 | 9 |
| 7 | Maxime Boudreault | Canada | 1 rep (186 kilograms (410 lb) log) | 8 | 8 |
| 8 | Kevin Faires | United States | 2 reps (172 kilograms (379 lb) log) | 7 | 7 |
| 9 | Oleksii Novikov | Ukraine | 1 rep (172 kilograms (379 lb) log) | 6 | 6 |
| 10 | Tom Stoltman | United Kingdom | No lift | 0 | 0 |
| 10 | Gavin Bilton | United Kingdom | No lift | 0 | 0 |
| 10 | Aivars Šmaukstelis | Latvia | No lift | 0 | 0 |
| 10 | Adam Bishop | United Kingdom | No lift | 0 | 0 |
| 10 | Luke Stoltman | United Kingdom | No lift | 0 | 0 |

=== Event 2: Wheelbarrow Carry & Arm Over Arm ===
Athletes had to lift 3 sandbags into a wheelbarrow and then push it a marked distance. They would then perform an Arm Over Arm pull.

- Weight: Sandbags weighing 136 kilograms (300 lb), 147.3 kilograms (325 lb) and 158.7 kilograms (350 lb). 317.5 kilograms (700 lb) Arm Over Arm.

| # | Athlete | Nation | Time | Event Points | Overall Points |
|---|---|---|---|---|---|
| 1 | Maxime Boudreault | Canada | 1:00.55 | 14 | 22 |
| 2 | Mitchell Hooper | Canada | 1:02.29 | 13 | 25 |
| 3 | Evan Singleton | United States | 1:08.00 | 12 | 21 |
| 4 | Brian Shaw | United States | 1:10.99 | 11 | 22 |
| 5 | Tom Stoltman | United Kingdom | Finished | 10 | 10 |
| 6 | Thomas Evans | United States | Finished | 9 | 19 |
| 7 | Oleksii Novikov | Ukraine | Finished | 8 | 14 |
| 8 | Kevin Faires | United States | DNF Pull | 7 | 14 |
| 9 | Trey Mitchell | United States | DNF Pull | 6 | 20 |
| 10 | Gavin Bilton | United Kingdom | DNF Pull | 5 | 5 |
| 11 | Bobby Thompson | United States | DNF Pull | 4 | 17 |
| 12 | Aivars Šmaukstelis | Latvia | DNF Pull | 3 | 3 |
| 13 | Adam Bishop | United Kingdom | DNF Pull | 2 | 2 |
| 14 | Luke Stoltman | United Kingdom | DNF Barrow | 1 | 1 |

=== Event 3: Car Leg Press ===
- Weight: 840 kilograms (1,850 lb)

| # | Athlete | Nation | Repetitions | Event Points | Overall Points |
|---|---|---|---|---|---|
| 1 | Brian Shaw | United States | 14 | 14 | 36 |
| 2 | Mitchell Hooper | Canada | 13 | 12.5 | 37.5 |
| 2 | Trey Mitchell | United States | 13 | 12.5 | 32.5 |
| 4 | Evan Singleton | United States | 12 | 11 | 32 |
| 5 | Bobby Thompson | United States | 11 | 10 | 27 |
| 6 | Tom Stoltman | United Kingdom | 10 | 9 | 19 |
| 7 | Kevin Faires | United States | 9 | 8 | 22 |
| 8 | Oleksii Novikov | Ukraine | 8 | 7 | 21 |
| 9 | Gavin Bilton | United Kingdom | 7 | 6 | 11 |
| 10 | Thomas Evans | United States | 5 | 4 | 23 |
| 10 | Aivars Šmaukstelis | Latvia | 5 | 4 | 7 |
| 10 | Adam Bishop | United Kingdom | 5 | 4 | 6 |
| 13 | Luke Stoltman | United Kingdom | 4 | 2 | 3 |
| 14 | Maxime Boudreault | Canada | 1 | 1 | 23 |

=== Event 4: Atlas Stones ===
- Weight: 5 stone series ranging from 158–204 kilograms (348–450 lb)
- Notes: Some of the times were not revealed

| # | Athlete | Nation | Time | Event Points | Overall Points |
|---|---|---|---|---|---|
| 1 | Tom Stoltman | United Kingdom | 5 in 23.00 | 14 | 33 |
| 2 | Brian Shaw | United States | 5 in 26.00 | 13 | 49 |
| 3 | Mitchell Hooper | Canada | 5 in 27.30 | 12 | 49.5 |
| 4 | Trey Mitchell | United States | 5 in 29.00 | 11 | 43.5 |
| 5 | Aivars Šmaukstelis | Latvia | 5 in 31.50 | 10 | 17 |
| 6 | Gavin Bilton | United Kingdom | 5 in 53 | 9 | 20 |
| 7 | Luke Stoltman | United Kingdom | 5 in 53 | 8 | 11 |
| 8 | Maxime Boudreault | Canada | 5 in 57.00 | 7 | 30 |
| 9 | Thomas Evans | United States | 4 Stones | 6 | 29 |
| 10 | Oleksii Novikov | Ukraine | 4 Stones | 5 | 26 |
| 11 | Evan Singleton | United States | 3 Stones | 4 | 36 |
| 12 | Kevin Faires | United States | 3 Stones | 3 | 25 |
| 13 | Adam Bishop | United Kingdom | 3 Stones | 2 | 8 |
| 14 | Bobby Thompson | United States | No lift | 0 | 27 |

=== Event 5: Max Hummer Tyre Deadlift ===
| # | Athlete | Nation | Weight | Event Points | Overall Points |
|---|---|---|---|---|---|
| 1 | Tom Stoltman | United Kingdom | 499 kilograms (1,100 lb) | 14 | 47 |
| 2 | Brian Shaw | United States | 476 kilograms (1,049 lb) | 11 | 60 |
| 2 | Mitchell Hooper | Canada | 476 kilograms (1,049 lb) | 11 | 60.5 |
| 2 | Trey Mitchell | United States | 476 kilograms (1,049 lb) | 11 | 54.5 |
| 2 | Oleksii Novikov | Ukraine | 476 kilograms (1,049 lb) | 11 | 37 |
| 2 | Bobby Thompson | United States | 476 kilograms (1,049 lb) | 11 | 38 |
| 7 | Gavin Bilton | United Kingdom | 431 kilograms (950 lb) | 7 | 27 |
| 7 | Thomas Evans | United States | 431 kilograms (950 lb) | 7 | 36 |
| 7 | Evan Singleton | United States | 431 kilograms (950 lb) | 7 | 43 |
| 8 | Aivars Šmaukstelis | Latvia | 408 kilograms (899 lb) | 4 | 21 |
| 8 | Luke Stoltman | United Kingdom | 408 kilograms (899 lb) | 4 | 15 |
| 8 | Kevin Faires | United States | 408 kilograms (899 lb) | 4 | 29 |
| 13 | Maxime Boudreault | Canada | No lift | 0 | 30 |

=== Event 6: Standing Chest Press ===
Athletes stood with their backs against a pad and pushed the handles as if performing a standing bench press. With each repetition, a keg was added to the machine before the next rep. There were eight kegs in total, if an athlete finished all 8 kegs, they continued at the max weight until the time expired.

- Weight: Eight kegs weighing between 177–261 kilograms (390–575 lb)

| # | Athlete | Nation | Repetitions | Event Points | Overall Points |
|---|---|---|---|---|---|
| 1 | Brian Shaw | United States | 9 | 14 | 74 |
| 2 | Thomas Evans | United States | 8 | 13 | 49 |
| 3 | Mitchell Hooper | Canada | 7 | 10.5 | 71 |
| 3 | Bobby Thompson | United States | 7 | 10.5 | 48.5 |
| 3 | Evan Singleton | United States | 7 | 10.5 | 53.5 |
| 3 | Kevin Faires | United States | 7 | 10.5 | 39.5 |
| 7 | Tom Stoltman | United Kingdom | 6 | 7 | 54 |
| 7 | Trey Mitchell | United States | 6 | 7 | 61.5 |
| 7 | Luke Stoltman | United Kingdom | 6 | 7 | 22 |
| 10 | Aivars Šmaukstelis | Latvia | 5 | 5 | 26 |
| 11 | Oleksii Novikov | Ukraine | 4 | 3 | 40 |
| 11 | Gavin Bilton | United Kingdom | 4 | 3 | 30 |
| 11 | Maxime Boudreault | Canada | 4 | 3 | 33 |

=== Event 7: Bag over Bar ===
Athletes tossed eight sandbags over a 4.5 metres (15 ft) bar in the quickest time possible.

- Weight: 2 x 22 kilograms (49 lb), 2 x 25 kilograms (55 lb), 2 x 27 kilograms (60 lb), 2 x 29 kilograms (64 lb)
- Bar Height: 4.57 metres (15.0 ft)
- Notes: Final times were not revealed

| # | Athlete | Nation | Time | Event Points | Overall Points |
|---|---|---|---|---|---|
| 1 | Tom Stoltman | United Kingdom | 8 bags | 14 | 68 |
| 2 | Maxime Boudreault | Canada | 8 bags | 13 | 46 |
| 3 | Brian Shaw | United States | 8 bags | 12 | 86 |
| 4 | Evan Singleton | United States | 7 bags | 11 | 64.5 |
| 5 | Gavin Bilton | United Kingdom | 7 bags | 10 | 40 |
| 6 | Mitchell Hooper | Canada | 6 bags | 9 | 80 |
| 7 | Bobby Thompson | United States | 6 bags | 8 | 56.5 |
| 8 | Thomas Evans | United States | 6 bags | 7 | 56 |
| 9 | Trey Mitchell | United States | 6 bags | 6 | 67.5 |
| 10 | Luke Stoltman | United Kingdom | 6 bags | 5 | 27 |
| 11 | Kevin Faires | United States | 4 bags | 4 | 43.5 |
| 12 | Aivars Šmaukstelis | Latvia | 4 bags | 3 | 29 |
| 13 | Oleksii Novikov | Ukraine | 4 bags | 2 | 42 |

=== Event 8: Fingal's Fingers & Power Stairs Medley ===
Athletes had to lift 2 Fingal's fingers followed by lifting 2 implements up 5 stairs each.

- Weight: 2 x Fingal's fingers weighing 136 kilograms (300 lb) and 147 kilograms (324 lb). 2 x implements weighing 250 kilograms (550 lb) and 272 kilograms (600 lb)
- Notes: Final times were not revealed

| # | Athlete | Nation | Time | Event Points | Overall Points |
|---|---|---|---|---|---|
| 1 | Tom Stoltman | United Kingdom | 10 stairs | 14 | 82 |
| 2 | Evan Singleton | United States | 10 stairs | 13 | 77.5 |
| 3 | Aivars Šmaukstelis | Latvia | 10 stairs | 12 | 41 |
| 4 | Maxime Boudreault | Canada | 10 stairs | 11 | 57 |
| 5 | Brian Shaw | United States | 10 stairs | 10 | 96 |
| 6 | Mitchell Hooper | Canada | 8 stairs | 9 | 89 |
| 7 | Thomas Evans | United States | 7 stairs | 8 | 64 |
| 8 | Bobby Thompson | United States | 6 stairs | 5.5 | 62 |
| 8 | Trey Mitchell | United States | 6 stairs | 5.5 | 73 |
| 8 | Luke Stoltman | United Kingdom | 6 stairs | 5.5 | 32.5 |
| 8 | Kevin Faires | United States | 6 stairs | 5.5 | 49 |
| 12 | Gavin Bilton | United Kingdom | 5 stairs | 3 | 43 |
| 13 | Oleksii Novikov | Ukraine | 1 stair | 2 | 44 |

=== Final standings ===
| # | Athlete | Nation | Points |
|---|---|---|---|
| 1st place, gold medalist(s) | Brian Shaw | United States | 96 |
| 2nd place, silver medalist(s) | Mitchell Hooper | Canada | 89 |
| 3rd place, bronze medalist(s) | Tom Stoltman | United Kingdom | 82 |
| 4 | Evan Singleton | United States | 77.5 |
| 5 | Trey Mitchell | United States | 73 |
| 6 | Thomas Evans | United States | 64 |
| 7 | Bobby Thompson | United States | 62 |
| 8 | Maxime Boudreault | Canada | 57 |
| 9 | Kevin Faires | United States | 49 |
| 10 | Oleksii Novikov | Ukraine | 44 |
| 11 | Gavin Bilton | United Kingdom | 43 |
| 12 | Aivars Šmaukstelis | Latvia | 41 |
| 13 | Luke Stoltman | United Kingdom | 32.5 |
| 14 | Adam Bishop | United Kingdom | 8 |

== Open Men's Results ==
=== Events ===
- Overhead Medley: 2 x 150 kilograms (330 lb) log + 2 x 150 kilograms (330 lb) axle + 100 kilograms (220 lb) dumbbell for repetitions. 1 minute 15 second time limit.
- Medley: Loading 3 sacks weighing 136 kilograms (300 lb), 147 kilograms (324 lb), 159 kilograms (351 lb) into a wheelbarrow which is then pushed down a 24 metres (79 ft) course. 1 minute 15 second time limit.
- Atlas Stones: 5 stone series weighing 159–204 kilograms (351–450 lb). 60 second time limit.
- Car Deadlift: 363 kilograms (800 lb) for repetitions. 60 second time limit.
- Super Yoke: 454 kilograms (1,001 lb) yoke down a 24 metres (79 ft) course. 60 second time limit.

=== Results ===
| # | Athlete | Event 1 - Overhead Medley | Event 2 - Medley | Event 3 - Atlas Stones | Event 4 - Deadlift | Event 5 - Super Yoke | Pts |
|---|---|---|---|---|---|---|---|
| 1st place, gold medalist(s) | (United States) Austin Andrade | 3rd - 6 reps | 1st - 35.36 | 1st - 5 in 47.07 | 7th - 9 reps | 7th - 27.51 | 65 |
| 2nd place, silver medalist(s) | (Canada) Wesley Derwinsky | 9th - 3 reps | 3rd - 37.91 | 9th - 4 in 39.77 | 2nd - 13 reps | 2nd - 21.56 | 59 |
| 3rd place, bronze medalist(s) | (Canada) Joey Lavallée | 11th - 3 reps | 5th - 42.44 | 5th - 4 in 31.48 | 4th - 11 reps | 1st - 20.82 | 58.5 |
| 4 | (United States) Brett Thompson | 4th - 5 reps | 11th - 1:07.40 | 7th - 4 in 32.98 | 1st - 14 reps | 4th - 23.24 | 57.5 |
| 5 | (United States) Tim Buck | 2nd - 6 reps | 7th - 47.31 | 3rd - 5 in 56.95 | 12th - 5 reps | 6th - 26.59 | 54.5 |
| 6 | (United States) Nathan Goltry | 6th - 5 reps | 15th - DNF 3 sacks | 6th - 4 in 32.21 | 1st - 14 reps | 5th - 26.02 | 51.5 |
| 7 | (Canada) Tristain Hoath | 8th - 4 reps | 6th - 42.92 | 8th - 4 in 38.68 | 6th - 10 reps | 9th - 30.64 | 48 |
| 8 | (Canada) James Jeffers | 10th - 3 reps | 2nd - 36.23 | 4th - 4 in 25.60 | 10th - 7 reps | 15th - DNF | 44 |
| 9 | (United States) Bryce Johnson | 15th - 3 reps | 12th - 1:08.30 | 2nd - 5 in 50.18 | 11th - 6 reps | 3rd - 22.58 | 42 |
| 10 | (United States) Nicholas Guardione | 5th - 5 reps | 4th - 39.47 | 10th - 4 in 45.50 | 12th - 5 reps | 12th - 39.34 | 41.5 |
| 11 | (United States) Josh Gregory | 13th - 3 reps | 8th - 47.71 | 13th - 3 in 21.46 | 4th - 11 reps | 14th - 41.92 | 32.5 |
| 12 | (United States) Zach Price | 1st - 7 reps | 13th - 1:11.34 | 14th - 3 in 27.21 | 14th - 3 reps | 11th - 37.62 | 31.5 |
| 13 | (United States) Alexander Kopp | 14th - 3 reps | 10th - 59.10 | 11th - 2 in 48.73 | 7th - 9 reps | 10th - 40.25 | 28 |
| 13 | (United States) Josh Spurgeon | 16th - 2 reps | 9th - 52.52 | 11th - 3 in 20.62 | 7th - 9 reps | 13th - 34.15 | 28 |
| 15 | (United States) Andrew Montoya | 7th - 4 reps | 14th - 1:14.59 | 12th - 3 in 21.00 | 16th - 0 reps | 8th - 27.65 | 27 |
| 16 | (United States) Donald Treglia | 12th - 3 reps | 16th - DNF 2 sacks | 16th - 1 in 11.24 | 14th - 3 reps | 16th - DNF | 10.5 |

== Open Women's Results ==
=== Events ===
- Overhead Medley: 2 x 91 kilograms (201 lb) log + 2 x 91 kilograms (201 lb) axle + 54 kilograms (119 lb) dumbbell for repetitions. 1 minute 15 second time limit.
- Medley: Loading 3 sacks weighing 91 kilograms (201 lb), 113 kilograms (249 lb), 159 kilograms (351 lb) into a wheelbarrow which is then pushed down a 24 metres (79 ft) course. 1 minute 15 second time limit.
- Car Deadlift: 227 kilograms (500 lb) for repetitions. 60 second time limit.
- Super Yoke: 300 kilograms (660 lb) down a 24 metres (79 ft) course. 60 second time limit.
- Bag over Bar: 6 bags weighing 12–16 kilograms (26–35 lb) over a 4.57 metres (15.0 ft) bar. 1 minute 15 second time limit.

| # | Athlete | Event 1 Overhead Medley | Event 2 Medley | Event 3 Deadlift | Event 4 Super Yoke | Event 5 Bag Over Bar | Pts |
|---|---|---|---|---|---|---|---|
| 1st place, gold medalist(s) | (Ukraine) Olga Liashchuk | 3rd - 9 reps | 1st - 47.27 | 2nd - 12 reps | 1st - 18.96 | 1st - 6 in 35.70 | 67 |
| 2nd place, silver medalist(s) | (Canada) Samantha Belliveau | 2nd - 10 reps | 3rd - 51.98 | 3rd - 10 reps | 2nd - 20.75 | 2nd - 6 in 43.57 | 63 |
| 3rd place, bronze medalist(s) | (Canada) Melissa Peacock | 1st - 11 reps | 5th - DNF (3 sacks) | 1st - 20 reps | 3rd - 20.92 | 5th - 4 in 30.40 | 60 |
| 4 | (Canada) Jackie Osczevski | 9th - 1 rep | 2nd - 51.35 | 4th - 6 reps | 4th - 23.73 | 3rd - 4 in 22.81 | 52.5 |
| 5 | (United States) Cori Butler | 5th - 4 reps | 4th - 1:10.47 | 8th - 2 reps | 5th - 25.35 | 6th - 4 in 37.99 | 47 |
| 6 | (United States) Jackie Rhodes | 6th - 3 reps | 11th - DNF (1 sack) | 7th - 3 reps | 6th - 30.40 | 4th - 4 in 29.96 | 41 |
| 7 | (United States) Rebecca Houston | 8th - 2 reps | 13th - DNF (1 sack) | 6th - 5 reps | 8th - DNF | 10th - 2 in 30.45 | 30 |
| 7 | (United States) Morgan Irons | 6th - 3 reps | 7th - DNF (2 sacks) | 10th - 0 reps | 9th - DNF | 7th - 2 in 20.37 | 30 |
| 9 | (Canada) Stephanie Bisignano | 4th - 6 reps | 12th - DNF (1 sack) | 10th - 0 reps | 7th - 32.91s | 9th - 2 in 29.27 | 28 |
| 10 | (United States) Austyn Grubb | 10th - 0 reps | 6th - DNF (2 sacks) | 4th - 6 reps | 11th - DNF | 11th - 2 in 35.07 | 27 |
| 11 | (United States) Jess Trumbull | 10th - 0 reps | 8th - DNF (2 sacks) | 9th - 1 rep | 10th - DNF | 13th - 0 in 1:15.00 | 18 |
| 12 | (Canada) Joscelyne O'Brien | 10th - 0 reps | 10th - DNF (1 sack) | 10th - 0 reps | 11th - DNF | 12th - 2 in 50.80 | 11.5 |
| 13 | (Canada) Laura de Berdt Romilly | 10th - 0 reps | 9th - DNF (2 sacks) | 10th - 0 reps | 12th - DNF | 13th - 0 in 0 in 1:15.00 | 8 |
| 13 | (United States) Angela Highfield | 10th - 0 reps | 14th - (No lift) | 10th - 0 reps | 13th - DNF | 8th - 2 in 23.71 | 8 |
