= 2020 World's Strongest Man =

Strongman competition in 2020

Competition information
- Dates: 12–15 November 2020
- Venue: Premier Sports Campus – Lakewood Ranch
- Location: Bradenton, Florida
- Country: United States
- Athletes participating: 25
- Nations participating: 10

Champion(s)
- (Ukraine) Oleksii Novikov

The 2020 World's Strongest Man was the 43rd edition of the World's Strongest Man competition. It took place in Bradenton, Florida between November 11 and 15. Oleksii Novikov of Ukraine won the competition for the first time in his career, with Tom Stoltman of Great Britain taking second and Jean-François Caron of Canada taking third. At 24 years old, Novikov is the youngest man to win the event since Jón Páll Sigmarsson in 1984.

== Scheduling and participants ==
The event was originally scheduled to take place May 20 to 24 in Bradenton, Florida, but was postponed due to the COVID-19 pandemic. The actual event itself also experienced scheduling issues because of Hurricane Eta.

Defending champion Martins Licis and two-time runner up Mateusz Kieliszkowski did not take part this year due to injury. 2018 champion Hafþór Júlíus Björnsson also did not take part after announcing his retirement earlier in the year.

== Participants ==
- Oleksii Novikov (Ukraine)
- Tom Stoltman (United Kingdom)
- Jean-François Caron (Canada)
- Jerry Pritchett (United States)
- Brian Shaw (United States)
- Adam Bishop (United Kingdom)
- Kevin Faires (United States)
- Aivars Šmaukstelis (Latvia)
- Luke Richardson (United Kingdom)
- Graham Hicks (United Kingdom)
- Robert Oberst (United States)
- Pa O'Dwyer (Republic of Ireland)
- Gabriel Peña (Mexico)
- Mikhail Shivlyakov (Russia)
- Evan Singleton (United States)
- Mark Felix (United Kingdom)
- Maxime Boudreault (Canada)
- Trey Mitchell (United States)
- Gavin Bilton (United Kingdom)
- Bobby Thompson (United States)
- Eyþór Ingólfsson Melsteð (Iceland)
- Ervin Toots (Estonia)
- Terry Hollands (United Kingdom)
- Luke Stoltman (United Kingdom)
- Nick Best (United States)

== Heat Results ==
=== Format ===
There are five competitors per group. After four events, the competitor with the highest score qualifies for the final. The competitors in second and third place take part in the Stone Off, a run of loading 8 Atlas Stones, with the winner progressing.

=== Heat 1 ===
- Events: Farmer's Walk, Deadlift for repetitions, Loading Race, Log Lift for repetitions.

#	Name	Nationality	Pts
1	Jerry Pritchett	United States	17
2	Luke Richardson	United Kingdom	15
3	Robert Oberst	United States	11
4	Pa O'Dwyer	Ireland	9
5	Gabriel Peña	Mexico	6

Stone Off

Name	Nationality	Time
Luke Richardson	United Kingdom	5 in 0m 47.56
Robert Oberst	United States	4 in 1m 03.70

=== Heat 2 ===
- Events: Farmer's Walk, Deadlift for repetitions, Loading Race, Dumbbell Press Medley.

#	Name	Nationality	Pts
1	Kevin Faires	United States	14
2	Mikhail Shivlyakov	Russia	13
3	Evan Singleton (Note: Evan Singleton withdrew due to a biceps tear, Adam Bishop replaced him in the Stone Off.)	United States	13
4	Adam Bishop	United Kingdom	11
5	Mark Felix	United Kingdom	9

Stone Off

Name	Nationality	Time
Adam Bishop	United Kingdom	6 in 0m 53.04
Mikhail Shivlyakov	Russia	5 in 0m 34.19

=== Heat 3 ===
- Events: Farmer's Walk, Squat Lift for repetitions, Loading Race, Dumbbell Press Medley.

#	Name	Nationality	Pts
1	Oleksii Novikov	Ukraine	17
2	Tom Stoltman	United Kingdom	15
3	Maxime Boudreault	Canada	13
4	Trey Mitchell	United States	10
5	Gavin Bilton	United Kingdom	4

Stone Off

Name	Nationality	Time
Tom Stoltman	United Kingdom	8 in 0m 39.00
Maxime Boudreault	Canada	7 in 0m 38.30

=== Heat 4 ===
- Events: Farmer's Walk, Squat Lift for repetitions, Loading Race, Log Lift for repetitions.

#	Name	Nationality	Pts
1	Jean-François Caron	Canada	16.5
2	Bobby Thompson	United States	14.5
3	Graham Hicks	United Kingdom	12
4	Eyþór Ingólfsson Melsteð	Iceland	11
5	Ervin Toots	Estonia	3

Stone Off

Name	Nationality	Time
Graham Hicks	United Kingdom	6 in 0m 50.34
Bobby Thompson	United States	5 in 1m 15.09

=== Heat 5 ===
- Events: Farmer's Walk, Deadlift for repetitions, Loading Race, Dumbbell Press Medley.

#	Name	Nationality	Pts
1	Brian Shaw	United States	15.5
2	Terry Hollands	United Kingdom	14.5
3	Aivars Šmaukstelis	Latvia	13.5
4	Luke Stoltman	United Kingdom	11.5
5	Nick Best	United States	4

Stone Off

Name	Nationality	Time
Aivars Šmaukstelis	Latvia	7 in 0m 39.57
Terry Hollands	United Kingdom	6 in 0m 33.43

== Finals Events Results ==
=== Event 1: Giant's Medley ===
- Weight: 125 kilograms (276 lb) anvil, 454 kilograms (1,001 lb) yoke
- Course Length: 10 metres (33 ft) anvil, 15 metres (49 ft) yoke
- Time Limit: 75 seconds

#	Name	Nationality	Time	Event Pts	Overall Pts
1	Adam Bishop	United Kingdom	0m 22.55	10	10
2	Oleksii Novikov	Ukraine	0m 23.79	9	9
3	Jerry Pritchett	United States	0m 24.71	8	8
4	Kevin Faires	United States	0m 26.22	7	7
5	Tom Stoltman	United Kingdom	0m 26.61	6	6
6	Jean-François Caron	Canada	0m 26.92	5	5
7	Brian Shaw	United States	0m 27.03	4	4
8	Aivars Šmaukstelis	Latvia	0m 34.97	3	3
9	Luke Richardson	United Kingdom	0m 36.70	2	2
10	Graham Hicks (Note: Graham Hicks withdrew following this event due to a biceps tear.)	United Kingdom	DNF 16.19 metres (53.1 ft)	1	1

=== Event 2: Max Deadlift ===
- 18-Inch Deadlift For Max Weight
- Opening Weight: 400 kilograms (880 lb)

#	Name	Nationality	Weight	Event Pts	Overall Pts
1	Oleksii Novikov (Note: Oleksii Novikov's 537.5 kg (1,185 lb) lift broke a WSM record for this event that had stood since Tom Magee lifted 535 kg (1,179 lb) in the 1983 contest.)	Ukraine	537.5 kilograms (1,185 lb)	10	19
2	Adam Bishop	United Kingdom	509 kilograms (1,122 lb)	8	18
2	Jerry Pritchett	United States	509 kilograms (1,122 lb)	8	16
2	Jean-François Caron	Canada	509 kilograms (1,122 lb)	8	13
5	Tom Stoltman	United Kingdom	478 kilograms (1,054 lb)	5.5	11.5
5	Brian Shaw	United States	478 kilograms (1,054 lb)	5.5	9.5
7	Kevin Faires	United States	440 kilograms (970 lb)	4	11
8	Aivars Šmaukstelis	Latvia	400 kilograms (880 lb)	2.5	5.5
8	Luke Richardson	United Kingdom	400 kilograms (880 lb)	2.5	4.5

=== Event 3: Keg Toss ===
- Weight: 8 kegs ranging from 18–25 kilograms (40–55 lb)
- Height: 4.5 metres (15 ft)
- Time Limit: 60 seconds

#	Name	Nationality	Time	Event Pts	Overall Pts
1	Tom Stoltman	United Kingdom	8 in 0m 20.05	10	21.5
2	Jean-François Caron	Canada	8 in 0m 20.37	9	22
3	Brian Shaw	United States	8 in 0m 21.75	8	17.5
4	Aivars Šmaukstelis	Latvia	8 in 0m 24.88	7	12.5
5	Oleksii Novikov	Ukraine	8 in 0m 26.96	6	25
6	Luke Richardson	United Kingdom	8 in 0m 27.82	5	9.5
7	Adam Bishop	United Kingdom	8 in 0m 39.90	4	22
8	Jerry Pritchett	United States	7 in 0m 39.94	3	19
9	Kevin Faires	United States	6 in 0m 19.04	2	13

=== Event 4: Hercules Hold ===
- Weight: 160 kilograms (350 lb) on each hand for as long as possible

#	Name	Nationality	Time	Event Pts	Overall Pts
1	Jean-François Caron	Canada	0m 52.67	10	32
2	Kevin Faires	United States	0m 49.22	9	22
3	Jerry Pritchett	United States	0m 42.99	8	27
4	Oleksii Novikov	Ukraine	0m 41.63	7	32
5	Luke Richardson	United Kingdom	0m 35.12	6	15.5
6	Brian Shaw	United States	0m 34.79	5	22.5
7	Adam Bishop	United Kingdom	0m 28.40	4	26
8	Aivars Šmaukstelis	Latvia	0m 28.17	3	15.5
9	Tom Stoltman	United Kingdom	0m 21.23	2	23.5

=== Event 5: Log Ladder ===
- Weight: 5 logs ranging from 131–182.5 kilograms (289–402 lb)
- Time Limit: 75 seconds

#	Name	Nationality	Time	Event Pts	Overall Pts
1	Tom Stoltman	United Kingdom	5 in 0m 49.45	10	33.5
2	Jerry Pritchett	United States	5 in 0m 51.18	9	36
3	Oleksii Novikov	Ukraine	4 in 0m 32.68	8	40
4	Aivars Šmaukstelis	Latvia	4 in 0m 41.24	7	22.5
5	Kevin Faires	United States	4 in 0m 46.67	6	28
6	Luke Richardson	United Kingdom	4 in 1m 02.12	5	20.5
7	Brian Shaw	United States	3 in 0m 27.91	4	26.5
8	Adam Bishop	United Kingdom	3 in 0m 37.02	3	29
9	Jean-François Caron	Canada	3 in 0m 47.05	2	34

=== Event 6: Atlas Stones ===
- Weight: 5 stones ranging from 150–210 kilograms (330–460 lb)
- Time Limit: 60 seconds
- Total Weight: 900 kilograms (2,000 lb)

#	Name	Nationality	Time	Event Pts	Overall Pts
1	Tom Stoltman	United Kingdom	5 in 0m 19.89	10	43.5
2	Brian Shaw	United States	5 in 0m 28.55	9	35.5
3	Jean-François Caron	Canada	5 in 0m 34.03	8	42
4	Oleksii Novikov	Ukraine	4 in 0m 19.47	7	47
5	Aivars Šmaukstelis	Latvia	4 in 0m 20.63	6	28.5
6	Adam Bishop	United Kingdom	4 in 0m 24.30	5	34
7	Jerry Pritchett	United States	4 in 0m 24.53	4	40
8	Kevin Faires	United States	4 in 0m 24.73	3	31
9	Luke Richardson	United Kingdom	3 in 0m 18.02	2	22.5

== Records ==
As part of the deadlift event, Novikov successfully performed a 537.5 kilograms (1,185 lb) 18-inch deadlift, "which bested the previous world record at a sanctioned event in 1983, according to a news release."

Mark Felix, by invitation, attempted to set a World's Strongest Man record in the Hercules Hold, but did not succeed.

Brian Shaw qualified for a record equalling 12th WSM final, tying the record of Zydrunas Savickas. With all of these finals being consecutive, he also broke his own record for consecutive finals. This was also Shaw's 11th top 5 finish, another record.

Mark Felix appeared in his 15th WSM contest, breaking the record of 14 held by himself and Savickas. Terry Hollands also appeared in his 14th contest.

== Final standings ==
#	Name	Nationality	Pts
1st place, gold medalist(s)	Oleksii Novikov	Ukraine	47
2nd place, silver medalist(s)	Tom Stoltman	United Kingdom	43.5
3rd place, bronze medalist(s)	Jean-François Caron (Note: Though he had placed in the top-ten in previous years, the third-place finish for Caron was his first time on the WSM podium.)	Canada	42
4	Jerry Pritchett	United States	40
5	Brian Shaw	United States	35.5
6	Adam Bishop	United Kingdom	34
7	Kevin Faires	United States	31
8	Aivars Šmaukstelis	Latvia	28.5
9	Luke Richardson	United Kingdom	22.5
10	Graham Hicks (Note: Graham Hicks withdrew due to a biceps tear.)	United Kingdom	1 (injured)

Preceded by 2019 World's Strongest Man	2020 World's Strongest Man	Succeeded by 2021 World's Strongest Man
