= 2024 Europe's Strongest Man =

Competition information
- Dates: 13 April 2024
- Venue: First Direct Arena
- Location: Leeds
- Country: United Kingdom
- Athletes participating: 12
- Nations participating: 9

Champion(s)
- (United Kingdom) Luke Stoltman

The 2024 Europe's Strongest Man was a strongman competition that took place in Leeds, England on 13 April 2024 at the First Direct Arena.

Luke Stoltman won the competition to win his second Europe's Strongest Man title.

== Participants ==
- Ondřej Fojtů (CZE)
- Shane Flowers (UK)
- Luke Stoltman (UK)
- Aivars Šmaukstelis (LAT)
- Pavlo Kordiyaka (UKR)
- Pa O'Dwyer (IRL)
- Fredrik Johansson (SWE)
- Rauno Heinla (EST)
- Nicolas Cambi (ITA)
- Oleksii Novikov (UKR)
- Gavin Bilton (UK)
- Konstantine Janashia (GEO)

== Results of events ==
=== Event 1: Nicol stones ===
- Weight: 2 stones weighing 114 kilograms (251 lb) and 139 kilograms (306 lb)

#	Athlete	Nation	Distance	Event Points	Overall Points
1	Ondřej Fojtů	Czech Republic	24.18 metres (79.3 ft)	12	12
2	Shane Flowers	United Kingdom	22.62 metres (74.2 ft)	11	11
3	Luke Stoltman	United Kingdom	20 metres (66 ft)	9.5	9.5
3	Aivars Šmaukstelis	Latvia	20 metres (66 ft)	9.5	9.5
5	Pavlo Kordiyaka	Ukraine	17.15 metres (56.3 ft)	8	8
6	Pa O'Dwyer	Ireland	16.91 metres (55.5 ft)	7	7
7	Fredrik Johansson	Sweden	14.63 metres (48.0 ft)	6	6
8	Rauno Heinla	Estonia	14.13 metres (46.4 ft)	5	5
9	Nicola Cambi	Italy	13.93 metres (45.7 ft)	4	4
10	Oleksii Novikov	Ukraine	13 metres (43 ft)	3	3
11	Gavin Bilton	United Kingdom	12.64 metres (41.5 ft)	2	2
12	Konstantine Janashia	Georgia	10.21 metres (33.5 ft)	1	1

=== Event 2: Car walk ===
- Weight: Car weighing 450 kilograms (990 lb)
- Course length: 20 metres (66 ft)

#	Athlete	Nation	Time (s)	Event Points	Overall Points
1	Luke Stoltman	United Kingdom	16.13	12	21.5
2	Nicola Cambi	Italy	16.57	11	15
3	Oleksii Novikov	Ukraine	16.67	10	13
4	Pavlo Kordiyaka	Ukraine	16.73	9	17
5	Konstantine Janashia	Georgia	22.38	8	9
6	Aivars Šmaukstelis	Latvia	24.33	7	16.5
7	Ondřej Fojtů	Czech Republic	26.09	6	18
8	Pa O'Dwyer	Ireland	27.69	5	12
9	Rauno Heinla	Estonia	29.16	4	9
10	Gavin Bilton	United Kingdom	32.16	3	5
11	Shane Flowers	United Kingdom	41.54	2	13
12	Fredrik Johansson	Sweden	48.10	1	7

=== Event 3: Deadlift ladder ===
- Weight: 5 bars ranging from 300–380 kilograms (660–840 lb)

#	Athlete	Nation	Time (s)	Event Points	Overall Points
1	Rauno Heinla	Estonia	5 in 41.28	12	21
2	Oleksii Novikov	Ukraine	5 in 47.91	11	24
3	Fredrik Johansson	Sweden	5 in 50.60	10	17
4	Pa O'Dwyer	Ireland	5 in 1:01.35	9	21
5	Nicola Cambi	Italy	4 in 30.02	8	24
6	Aivars Šmaukstelis	Latvia	4 in 31.65	7	23.5
7	Shane Flowers	United Kingdom	4 in 31.73	6	19
8	Gavin Bilton	United Kingdom	4 in 32.77	5	10
9	Ondřej Fojtů	Czech Republic	4 in 35.23	4	22
10	Luke Stoltman	United Kingdom	4 in 52.76	3	24.5
11	Pavlo Kordiyaka	Ukraine	4 in 1:02.53	2	19
12	Konstantine Janashia	Georgia	2 in 22.90	1	10

^ During the Nicol stones Konstantine Janashia suffered a hand injury and after the deadlift took no further part in the competition.

=== Event 4: Viking press ===
- Weight: 150 kilograms (330 lb)
- Time Limit: 60 seconds

#	Athlete	Nation	Repetitions	Event Points	Overall Points
1	Ondřej Fojtů	Czech Republic	16	12	34
2	Oleksii Novikov	Ukraine	14	11	35
3	Nicola Cambi	Italy	13	9	32
3	Aivars Šmaukstelis	Latvia	13	9	32.5
3	Luke Stoltman	United Kingdom	13	9	33.5
6	Pavlo Kordiyaka	Ukraine	12	7	26
7	Shane Flowers	United Kingdom	11	5.5	24.5
7	Gavin Bilton	United Kingdom	11	5.5	15.5
9	Pa O'Dwyer	Ireland	8	4	25
10	Rauno Heinla	Estonia	6	3	24
11	Fredrik Johansson	Sweden	0	0	17

^ During this event Fredrik Johansson suffered a knee injury and took no further part in the competition.

=== Event 5: Atlas stones ===
- Weight: 5 stones ranging from 100–180 kilograms (220–400 lb)
- Time Limit: 60 seconds

#	Athlete	Nation	Time (s)	Event Points	Overall Points
1	Shane Flowers	United Kingdom	5 in 18.53	12	36.5
2	Aivars Šmaukstelis	Latvia	5 in 18.58	10.5	43
2	Luke Stoltman	United Kingdom	5 in 18.58	10.5	44
4	Rauno Heinla	Estonia	5 in 24.60	9	33
5	Pa O'Dwyer	Ireland	5 in 27.04	8	33
6	Pavlo Kordiyaka	Ukraine	5 in 27.52	7	33
7	Gavin Bilton	United Kingdom	5 in 39.53	6	21.5
8	Oleksii Novikov	Ukraine	4 in 21.07	5	40
9	Ondřej Fojtů	Czech Republic	4 in 21.32	4	38
10	Nicola Cambi	Italy	4 in 32.78	3	35

== Final results ==
#	Athlete	Nation	Points
1st place, gold medalist(s)	Luke Stoltman	United Kingdom	44
2nd place, silver medalist(s)	Aivars Šmaukstelis	Latvia	43
3rd place, bronze medalist(s)	Oleksii Novikov	Ukraine	40
4	Ondřej Fojtů	Czech Republic	38
5	Shane Flowers	United Kingdom	36.5
6	Nicola Cambi	Italy	35
7	Rauno Heinla	Estonia	33
8	Pa O'Dwyer	Ireland	33
9	Pavlo Kordiyaka	Ukraine	33
10	Gavin Bilton	United Kingdom	21.5
11	Fredrik Johansson	Sweden	17
12	Konstantine Janashia	Georgia	10

Preceded by 2023 Europe's Strongest Man	Europe's Strongest Man	Succeeded by 2025 Europe's Strongest Man
