= Eyþór Ingólfsson Melsteð =

Icelandic strongman

Personal information
- Nationality: Icelandic
- Born: 16 February 1994 (age 32)
- Occupation: Strongman
- Height: 6 ft 1 in (1.85 m)
- Weight: 140–145 kg (309–320 lb)
Medal record
Strongman
Representing Iceland
World's Strongest Man
| Qualified | 2020 World's Strongest Man |
| 10th | 2021 World's Strongest Man |
| 9th | 2022 World's Strongest Man |
| Qualified | 2023 World's Strongest Man |
World's Ultimate Strongman
| 9th | 2020 World's Ultimate Strongman |
Rogue Invitational
| 9th | 2022 Rogue Invitational |
Europe's Strongest Man
| 7th | 2022 Europe's Strongest Man |
| 4th | 2023 Europe's Strongest Man |
Magnús Ver Magnússon Strongman Classic
| 2nd | 2021 Magnús Classic |
| 3rd | 2022 Magnús Classic |
Strongman Champions League
| 11th | 2019 SCL Norway |
Pasaulio Taurė
| 3rd | 2020 Pasaulio Taurė |
Iceland's Strongest Man
| 2nd | 2018 Iceland's Strongest Man |
| 4th | 2019 Iceland's Strongest Man |
| 2nd | 2020 Iceland's Strongest Man |
| 2nd | 2021 Iceland's Strongest Man |
Strongest Man in Iceland
| 2nd | 2018 |
| 2nd | 2019 |
| 1st | 2020 |
| 1st | 2021 |
Iceland's Strongest Viking
| 1st | 2020 |

Eyþór Ingólfsson Melsteð (transliterated as Eythor Ingolfsson Melsted in English, born 16 February 1994) is an Icelandic professional strongman from Reykjavík. He is a multiple entrant to the World's Strongest Man competition.

== Career ==
Eyþór was born an raised in Breiðdalsvík in the east coast of Iceland. He began his sporting career as an amateur bodybuilder. Upon realizing his strength, and coached by World's Strongest Man athlete Stefán Sölvi Pétursson he decided to try strongman following the traditional Icelandic strength roots.

In his 2018 strongman debut, Eyþór managed to emerge runner-up behind Hafþór Júlíus Björnsson in the Iceland's Strongest Man competition, which paved the way for him to enter the international strongman circuit. In 2019 he made his international debut at the Strongman Champions League Norway, and proceeded to qualify for the World's Strongest Man finals on two consecutive occasions in 2021 and 2022. He also secured podium finishes in both the 2021 and 2022 Magnús Ver Magnússon Strongman Classic, the 2020 Pasaulio Taurė, and was a finalist at the World's Ultimate Strongman, Rogue Invitational and Europe's Strongest Man competitions.

In the National circuit, Eyþór is a two-time winner of the Strongest Man in Iceland competition, winner of the 2020 Iceland's Strongest Viking competition and a three-time runner-up of the main national title, Iceland's Strongest Man. His personal best log press of 190 kg (419 lb) is the 4th heaviest by an Icelander, only behind Hafþór Júlíus Björnsson, Sigfús Fossdal and Benedikt Magnússon.

== Personal life ==
Eyþór is married to Ásrún Ösp Vilmundardóttir, an Icelandic IFBB professional women's figure competitor. Together they have a daughter, and they reside in Reykjavík.

== Personal records ==
- Deadlift (raw) – 380 kg (838 lb) (in training)
- Squat (raw) – 350 kg (772 lb) (in training)
- Log press – 185 kg (408 lb) (2021 World's Strongest Man, and 2022 Europe's Strongest Man)

→ Eyþór has also pressed 190 kg (419 lb) in training

- Flintstone barbell push press (behind the neck) – 190 kg (419 lb) (2022 World's Strongest Man)
- Stone press – 138 kg (304 lb) (2022 Magnús Ver Magnússon Strongman Classic)
- Húsafell Stone carry (around the pen) – 186 kg (410 lb) for 48.90 metres (160 ft 5 in) (around 1.4 revolutions) (2022 Magnús Ver Magnússon Classic)

→ Eyþór has also carried the stone in the linear path for 70.26 metres (230 ft 6 in) during 2020 Iceland's Strongest Man

- Inver Stones – 5 Stones weighing 125–191 kg (276–421 lb) in 66.43 seconds (2022 Rogue Invitational)
- Keg toss – 15 kg (33 lb) over 6.75 metres (22 ft 2 in) (2021 World's Strongest Man)
