= Pavlo Kordiyaka =

Ukrainian strongman (born 1995)

Personal information
- Nationality: Ukrainian
- Born: 2 July 1995 (age 31)
- Occupation: Strongman
- Height: 6 ft 5 in (1.96 m)
- Weight: 130–140 kg (287–309 lb)
Medal record
Strongman
Representing Ukraine
World's Strongest Man
Qualified	2022 World's Strongest Man
6th	2023 World's Strongest Man
8th	2024 World's Strongest Man
8th	2025 World's Strongest Man
4th	2026 World's Strongest Man
Rogue Invitational
9th	2024 Rogue Invitational
6th	2026 Rogue Invitational
Shaw Classic
15th	2024 Strongest Man on Earth
Europe's Strongest Man
4th	2022 Europe's Strongest Man
1st	2023 Europe's Strongest Man
7th	2024 Europe's Strongest Man
5th	2025 Europe's Strongest Man
2nd	2026 Europe's Strongest Man
Giants Live
8th	2023 Strongman Classic
4th	2023 World Tour Finals
3rd	2024 Strongman Classic
10th	2024 World Tour Finals
11th	2025 Strongman Classic
4th	2026 Strongman Classic
4th	2026 World Tour Finals
Strongman Champions League
1st	2023 SCL Cyprus
1st	2026 SCL Poland
Official Strongman Games
1st	2021 Official Strongman Games
Magnus ver Magnusson Strongman Classic
5th	2023 MVM Strongman Classic
World Strongman Championships
4th	2022
Marijampolė International
3rd	2019 Marijampolė International
2nd	2021 Marijampolė International
1st	2022 Marijampolė International
Middle East's Strongest Man
2nd	2021 Middle East's Strongest Man
Pahlavon Mahmud Strongman Grand Prix
1st	2019 PMS Grand Prix
Savickas Classic
2nd	2021 Savickas Classic
Ukraine's Strongest Man
5th	2017 Ukraine's Strongest Man
2nd	2018 Ukraine's Strongest Man
2nd	2019 Ukraine's Strongest Man
1st	2020 Ukraine's Strongest Man
8th	2021 Ukraine's Strongest Man

Pavlo Kordiyaka (Ukrainian: Павло Кордіяка, born 2 July 1995) is a Ukrainian strongman competitor from Lviv, Ukraine and the 2023 Europe's Strongest Man. He has also won 'Official Strongman Games', 'Marijampolė International', 'Pahlavon Mahmud Strongman Grand Prix' and 'Ukraine's Strongest Man' strongman competitions. Having competed in 36 international strongman competitions and winning 6 of them, Kordiyaka is among the 50 most decorated strongmen of all time.

== Background ==
Kordiyaka was an avid sportsman during his younger days, having taken part in football, acrobatics, boxing, wrestling and mixed martial arts. He was introduced to strongman at the age of 18 by former World's Strongest Man winner Vasyl Virastyuk. He often trains together with fellow Ukrainian world champions Oleksiy Novikov and Olga Liashchuk.

== Personal records ==
- Equipped Deadlift – 400 kg (882 lb) (during training)
- Log press – 200 kg (441 lb) (2023 Giants Live World Tour Finals)
- Axle press – 200 kg (441 lb) (2024 World's Strongest Man)
- Flintstone barbell split jerk (behind the neck) – 229.5 kg (506 lb) (2025 World's Strongest Man)
- Circus Dumbbell press – 132 kg (291 lb) (2023 World's Strongest Man)
- Manhood Stone (Max Atlas Stone) – 220 kg (485 lb) over 4 ft 1 in bar (during training)
- Atlas Stones – 5 Stones weighing 100–180 kg (220–397 lb) in 21.76 seconds (2023 Europe's Strongest Man)
- Húsafell Stone carry (around the pen) – 186 kg (410 lb) for 47.62 metres (156 ft 3 in) (around 1.4 revolutions) (2023 Magnús Ver Magnússon Classic)
- Basque circle (Conan's wheel) – 300 kg (661 lb) for 1035° rotation (2024 Giants Live Strongman Classic)
- Keg toss – 15 kg (33 lb) over 6.71 metres (22 ft 0 in) (2024 Strongest Man on Earth)
- Kettlebell Toss – 6 items 20–31 kg (44–68 lb) over 4.57 metres (15 ft 0 in) in 18.09 seconds (2023 World's Strongest Man, Group 1)
- Sandbag Toss – 6 items 18–27 kg (40–60 lb) over 4.57 metres (15 ft 0 in) in 20.07 secs (2021 Official Strongman Games)
- Tire Toss – 4 items 35 kg (77 lb) over 3.81 metres (12 ft 6 in) in 9.89 seconds (2020 Ukraine's Strongest Man) (World Record)

== Filmography ==
=== Television ===
Year	Title	Role	Notes
2022–2026	World's Strongest Man	Himself – Competitor	
