= Adam Bishop =

English strongman

Personal information
- Nickname: Bish
- Born: 7 January 1989 (age 37)
- Height: 6 ft 3 in (1.91 m)
- Weight: 155 kg (342 lb)
Medal record
Strongman
Representing United Kingdom
World's Strongest Man
Qualified	2015 World's Strongest Man
Qualified	2016 World's Strongest Man
Qualified	2018 World's Strongest Man
9th	2019 World's Strongest Man
6th	2020 World's Strongest Man
8th	2021 World's Strongest Man
Qualified	2022 World's Strongest Man
Qualified	2023 World's Strongest Man
Qualified	2024 World's Strongest Man
Qualified	2026 World's Strongest Man
Europe's Strongest Man
8th	2016 Europe's Strongest Man
11th	2017 Europe's Strongest Man
8th	2019 Europe's Strongest Man
2nd	2020 Europe's Strongest Man
10th	2021 Europe's Strongest Man
5th	2023 Europe's Strongest Man
3rd	2026 Europe's Strongest Man
Shaw Classic
6th	2020 Shaw Classic
7th	2021 Shaw Classic
14th	2023 Strongest Man on Earth
World's Ultimate Strongman
10th	2021 Worlds Ultimate Strongman
Giants Live
4th	2014 Scandinavian Open
10th	2015 Scandinavian Open
6th	2017 Scandinavian Open
3rd	2018 World Tour Finals
7th	2019 Wembley
7th	2019 World Tour Finals
4th	2021 Strongman Classic
2nd	2021 World Open
5th	2021 World Tour Finals
10th	2025 World Open
10th	2026 Strongman Classic
9th	2026 Strongman Open
Representing England
Britain's Strongest Man
5th	2015 Britain's Strongest Man
4th	2016 Britain's Strongest Man
9th	2017 Britain's Strongest Man
4th	2018 Britain's Strongest Man
2nd	2019 Britain's Strongest Man
1st	2020 Britain's Strongest Man
2nd	2021 Britain's Strongest Man
3rd	2022 Britain's Strongest Man
1st	2023 Britain's Strongest Man
6th	2024 Britain's Strongest Man
8th	2025 Britain's Strongest Man
2nd	2026 Britain's Strongest Man
UK's Strongest Man
Qualified	2013 UK's Strongest Man
2nd	2014 UK's Strongest Man

Adam Bishop is a retired English professional strongman. He is a two-time winner of the Britain's Strongest Man competition (2020, 2023) and one of the best deadlifters in strongman.

He has also competed in rugby, as a winger and in skeleton bobsleigh.

== Strongman career ==
Bishop refers to himself in the media as "one of the little guys" in the sport, despite weighing over 300 lbs constantly. He started competing in open strongman competitions in 2012, having progressed from the under-105 kg category. He secured second place at 2014 UK's Strongest Man and entered the heats for the World's Strongest Man in 2015, establishing himself as an up-and-coming talent.

Bishop steadily improved his standings in the competition, narrowly missing a place in the finals of the 2016 World's Strongest Man when he was beaten in the Atlas Stones. In the 2018 World's Strongest Man competition, Bishop failed to get past the qualifying heats after losing against Johan Els again in the Atlas Stones event. In 2018 World Tour Finals, he emerged second runner-up. In the 2019 World's Strongest Man competition, Bishop reached the finals for the first time, coming in ninth place overall.

In January 2020, Bishop won his first Britain's Strongest Man competition, after coming in 2nd the previous year. In the 2020 World's Strongest Man competition, Bishop reached the final once again and improved on his performance from the previous year, placing sixth overall. In September, Bishop placed 2nd at Europe's Strongest Man, while in December, he competed at the 2020 Shaw Classic and placed sixth overall. In 2021 Giants Live World Open he emerged runner-up to Evan Singleton.

In 2023, Bishop won Britain's Strongest Man for the second time, after coming in second in 2021 and third in 2022. In 2024, Bishop made it 2nd in the qualifiers in 2024's world's strongest man but had to withdraw due to injury. He established a world record in the moving deadlift ladder event. In 2025, he deadlited a personal best 470 kg (1,036 lb) at the World Deadlift Championships sharing second place with Austin Andrade, behind Hafþór Júlíus Björnsson's legendary 510 kg (1,124 lb) all-time world record, becoming one of only 11 men in strongman history to reach that number.

Bishop announced his retirement from competitive Strongman on September 5th, 2026 after placing 9th at the Giants Live Strongman Open in Birmingham.

== Other work ==
Bishop worked as an RFC Strength and Conditioning Coach for Harlequin F.C. In 2021, Bishop left Harlequin F.C. to focus full-time on his strongman career.

== Personal records ==
- Deadlift (with multi-ply suit and straps) – 470 kg (1,036 lb) (2025 World Deadlift Championships and Strongman Open)
- Deadlift for reps (raw with straps) – 400 kg (882 lb) x 5 reps and 360 kg (794 lb) x 1 rep (2024 Britain's Strongest man)
- Deadlift ladder (moving) – 300–380 kg (661–838 lb) x 5 reps (2024 World's Strongest Man, group 3) (world record)
- Hummer Tire Deadlift (15 inches off the floor) – 524 kg (1,155 lb) (2021 Shaw Classic)
- Giant Barbell Squat (for reps) – 340 kg (750 lb) × 5 reps (single-ply suit w/ wraps) (2019 World's Strongest Man)
- Log press – 181 kg (399 lb) (2021 Shaw Classic)
- Axle press – 180 kg (397 lb) (2018 Giants Live World Tour Finals)
- 5 Atlas Stones run (light set) – 100–180 kg (220–397 lb) 18.81 seconds (2021 Giants Live World Open)
- Frame carry (with straps) – 400 kg (882 lb) 20m course in 8.28 seconds (2019 Britain's Strongest Man) (world record)

Training:

- Deadlift (with multi-ply suit and straps) – 460 kg (1,014 lb)
- Deadlift (raw with straps) – 425 kg (937 lb)
