= Gavin Bilton =

British strongman

Gavin Quintus Bilton
Personal information
- Nickname: The Bull
- Born: 23 October 1988 (age 37) Caerphilly, Wales
- Height: 1.98 m (6 ft 6 in)
- Weight: 174 kg (384 lb)

Sport
- Sport: Strongman
Medal record
Strongman
Representing Great Britain
World's Strongest Man
Qualified	2020 World's Strongest Man
Qualified	2021 World's Strongest Man
Qualified	2022 World's Strongest Man
Qualified	2023 World's Strongest Man
Qualified	2024 World's Strongest Man
Europe's Strongest Man
8th	2020 Europe's Strongest Man
8th	2021 Europe's Strongest Man
11th	2022 Europe's Strongest Man
11th	2023 Europe's Strongest Man
10th	2024 Europe's Strongest Man
12th	2025 Europe's Strongest Man
Shaw Classic
11th	2023 Strongest Man on Earth
Giants Live
8th	2021 Strongman Classic
6th	2021 World Open
10th	2021 World Tour Finals
8th	2022 Strongman Classic
5th	2022 World Open
2nd	2023 World Open
6th	2023 World Tour Finals
11th	2024 Strongman Classic
11th	2024 World Open
7th	2025 World Open
7th	2025 World Tour Finals
Arnold Pro Strongman World Series
5th	2022 UK
7th	2024 UK
Representing Wales
Britain's Strongest Man
2nd	2023 Britain's Strongest Man
2nd	2024 Britain's Strongest Man
6th	2025 Britain's Strongest Man
4th	2026 Britain's Strongest Man
UK's Strongest Man
1st	2020 UK's Strongest Man
1st	2021 UK's Strongest Man
3rd	2022 UK's Strongest Man
Wales' Strongest Man
2nd	2018 Wales' Strongest Man
2nd	2019 Wales' Strongest Man
1st	2021 Wales' Strongest Man

Gavin Quintus Bilton (born 23 October 1988) is a strongman competitor from Wales.

== Early life ==
Bilton grew up in Caerphilly and attended Bedwas Infants School, Bedwas Junior School and Bedwas High School.

A former rugby union player, Bilton had spells at Welsh Premiership sides Bridgend, Swansea, Newport, and Bedwas. He played for Caerphilly RFC in the WRU National Bowl final at the Principality Stadium in 2017.

Also before becoming a strongman athlete, Bilton served for 13 years in the Welsh Guards, completing two tours in Afghanistan and acting as a Queen's Guard at Buckingham Palace. Since leaving the army, he set up his own gym in Caerphilly, called 'Area 51'.

== Career ==
Bilton started his strongman career with placing second at the 2018 Wales' Strongest Man competition. He again placed second the next year and placed fourth at 2019 UK's Strongest Man competition. Then he placed eighth at the 2020 Europe's Strongest Man competition. In October 2020, Bilton won 2021 UK's Strongest Man competition at the grounds of the Crumlin Road Jail in Belfast. He would go on to retain the title in 2021. In 2021 he won Wales' Strongest Man competition.

Bilton was invited for at the 2020 World's Strongest Man competition in Bradenton, Florida, US, where he finished 5th in his heat after sustaining a rib injury during the squat lift, failing to make it to the finals. He got invited for 4 more years for the World's Strongest Man, but failed to make it to the finals in any of them.

His career best win is the first place at 2023 SCL Serbia, defeating the likes of Kelvin de Ruiter and Fatih Karaca. He has secured a total of five career international podiums in strongman competitions.

He is known as The Bull.

== Personal records ==
- Deadlift (with multi-ply suit and straps) – 440 kg (970 lb) (2025 World Deadlift Championships and Strongman Open)
- Log press – 180 kg (397 lb) (2025 Giants Live World Tour Finals)
- Axle press – 170 kg (375 lb) (2021 Giants Live Strongman Classic)
