= 2021 World's Strongest Man =

Strongman competition in 2021

Competition information
- Dates: 15–20 June 2021
- Venue: Old Sacramento Waterfront
- Location: Sacramento, California
- Country: United States
- Athletes participating: 25
- Nations participating: 11

Champion(s)
- (United Kingdom) Tom Stoltman

The 2021 World's Strongest Man was the 44th edition of the World's Strongest Man competition, an event that took place in Sacramento, California from June 15 to June 20, 2021. The defending champion was Oleksii Novikov of Ukraine, though he failed to progress to the final after coming fourth in his heat. In so doing, he became the first World's Strongest Man reigning champion to compete at the following year's event and fail to qualify for the final since Magnús Ver Magnússon in the 1997 competition. The contest was won by Tom Stoltman who improved on his second place finish the previous year. Four-time champion Brian Shaw came second, returning to the podium after a 2 year absence, and Canada's Maxime Boudreault came third.

== Participants ==
Graham Hicks of the UK withdrew the day before the competition began, and was replaced by Ervin Toots of Estonia. As a result, Gavin Bilton of the UK was moved from group 5 to group 1, and Toots took Bilton's place in group 5.

- Gavin Bilton (United Kingdom)
- Maxime Boudreault (Canada)
- Travis Ortmayer (United States)
- Brian Shaw (United States)
- Aivars Šmaukstelis (Latvia)
- Mark Felix (United Kingdom)
- Johnny Hansson (Sweden)
- Tom Stoltman (United Kingdom)
- Trey Mitchell (United States)
- Evan Singleton (United States)
- Mikhail Shivlyakov (Russia)
- JF Caron (Canada)
- Robert Oberst (United States)
- Luke Richardson (United Kingdom)
- Eyþór Ingólfsson Melsteð (Iceland)
- Chris van der Linde (South Africa)
- Terry Hollands (United Kingdom)
- Adam Bishop (United Kingdom)
- Konstantine Janashia (Georgia (country))
- Jerry Pritchett (United States)
- Oleksii Novikov (Ukraine)
- Kevin Faires (United States)
- Luke Stoltman (United Kingdom)
- Bobby Thompson (United States)
- Ervin Toots (Estonia)

Luke Richardson suffered a biceps injury during the first day of competition and withdrew.

Terry Hollands suffered an injury during day 1 of the heats, and withdrew after 2 events.

Chris van der Linde also withdrew from the competition after 2 events.

=== Finalists ===
The contest is divided in a qualifying round and finals. There are ten finals participants, and in 2021 they include:

- Brian Shaw (United States)
- Trey Mitchell (United States)
- JF Caron (Canada)
- Konstantine Janashia (Georgia)
- Bobby Thompson (United States)
- Maxime Boudreault (Canada)
- Tom Stoltman (United Kingdom)
- Eythor Ingolfsson Melsted (Iceland)
- Adam Bishop (United Kingdom)
- Luke Stoltman (United Kingdom)

== Heat Results ==
=== Format ===
The 25 athletes were divided into 5 groups of 5 athletes, with 2 athletes from each group progressing to the final of 10. The winner of each group progressed to the final, and 2nd and 3rd in each group would then advance to a 'Stone Off', from which the winner would also progress.

=== Heat 1 ===
- Events: Loading Race, Squat Lift for repetitions, Fingal's Fingers, Overhead Medley, Pickaxe Hold.

| # | Name | Nationality | Pts |
|---|---|---|---|
| 1 | Brian Shaw | United States | 19.5 |
| 2 | Maxime Boudreault | Canada | 17 |
| 3 | Aivars Šmaukstelis | Latvia | 16.5 |
| 4 | Gavin Bilton | United Kingdom | 12 |
| 5 | Travis Ortmayer | United States | 10 |

Stone Off

| Name | Nationality | Stones |
|---|---|---|
| Maxime Boudreault | Canada | 7 |
| Aivars Smaukstelis | Latvia | 7 |

=== Heat 2 ===
- Events: Loading Race, Deadlift for repetitions, Train Push, Overhead Medley, Pickaxe Hold.

| # | Name | Nationality | Pts |
|---|---|---|---|
| 1 | Trey Mitchell | United States | 19 |
| 2 | Tom Stoltman | United Kingdom | 18 |
| 3 | Mark Felix | United Kingdom | 14 |
| 4 | Evan Singleton | United States | 13 |
| 5 | Johnny Hansson | Sweden | 11 |

Stone Off

| Name | Nationality | Stones |
|---|---|---|
| Tom Stoltman | United Kingdom | 5 |
| Mark Felix | United Kingdom | 5 |

=== Heat 3 ===
- Events: Loading Race, Squat Lift for repetitions, Train Push, Overhead Medley, Pickaxe Hold.

| # | Name | Nationality | Pts |
|---|---|---|---|
| 1 | JF Caron | Canada | 20 |
| 2 | Eyþór Ingólfsson Melsteð | Iceland | 17 |
| 3 | Robert Oberst | United States | 16 |
| 4 | Mikhail Shivlyakov | Russia | 15 |
| 5 | Luke Richardson | United Kingdom | 1 (injured) |

Stone Off

| Name | Nationality | Stones |
|---|---|---|
| Eyþór Ingólfsson Melsteð | Iceland | 5 |
| Robert Oberst | United States | 5 |

=== Heat 4 ===
- Events: Loading Race, Deadlift for repetitions, Fingal's Fingers, Overhead Medley, Pickaxe Hold.

| # | Name | Nationality | Pts |
|---|---|---|---|
| 1 | Konstantine Janashia | Georgia | 21 |
| 2 | Adam Bishop | United Kingdom | 17 |
| 3 | Jerry Pritchett | United States | 15 |
| 4 | Terry Hollands | United Kingdom | 7 (injured) |
| 5 | Chris van der Linde | South Africa | 3 (withdrew) |

Stone Off

| Name | Nationality | Stones |
|---|---|---|
| Adam Bishop | United Kingdom | 2 |
| Jerry Pritchett | United States | 2 |

=== Heat 5 ===
- Events: Loading Race, Deadlift for repetitions, Fingal's Fingers, Overhead Medley, Pickaxe Hold.

| # | Name | Nationality | Pts |
|---|---|---|---|
| 1 | Bobby Thompson | United States | 18 |
| 2 | Luke Stoltman | United Kingdom | 18 |
| 3 | Kevin Faires | United States | 17 |
| 4 | Oleksii Novikov | Ukraine | 17 |
| 5 | Ervin Toots | Estonia | 5 |

Stone Off

| Name | Nationality | Stones |
|---|---|---|
| Luke Stoltman | United Kingdom | 7 |
| Kevin Faires | United States | 7 |

== Finals Events Results ==
=== Event 1: Giant's Medley ===
- Weight: 440 kilograms (970 lb) yoke, 350 kilograms (770 lb) frame
- Course Length: 10 metres (33 ft) yoke, 15 metres (49 ft) frame

| # | Name | Nationality | Time (sec) | Event Pts | Overall Pts |
|---|---|---|---|---|---|
| 1 | Tom Stoltman | United Kingdom | 18.36 | 10 | 10 |
| 2 | Konstantine Janashia | Georgia | 20.31 | 9 | 9 |
| 3 | Brian Shaw | United States | 20.53 | 8 | 8 |
| 4 | Luke Stoltman | United Kingdom | 20.72 | 7 | 7 |
| 5 | JF Caron | Canada | 21.31 | 6 | 6 |
| 6 | Adam Bishop | United Kingdom | 22.39 | 5 | 5 |
| 7 | Bobby Thompson | United States | 25.06 | 4 | 4 |
| 8 | Maxime Boudreault | Canada | 31.43 | 3 | 3 |
| 9 | Trey Mitchell | United States | 45.61 | 2 | 2 |
| 10 | Eyþór Ingólfsson Melsteð | Iceland | DNF 10 metres (33 ft) | 1 | 1 |

=== Event 2: Titan's Turntable ===
- Weight: 30,000 kilograms (66,000 lb)
- Course Length: 30 metres (98 ft)
- Time Limit: 75 seconds

| # | Name | Nationality | Time | Event Pts | Overall Pts |
|---|---|---|---|---|---|
| 1 | Tom Stoltman | United Kingdom | 0m 46.89 | 10 | 20 |
| 2 | Trey Mitchell | United States | 0m 52.34 | 9 | 11 |
| 3 | Eyþór Ingólfsson Melsteð | Iceland | 0m 52.83 | 8 | 9 |
| 4 | Maxime Boudreault | Canada | 0m 55.16 | 7 | 10 |
| 5 | Luke Stoltman | United Kingdom | 0m 55.94 | 6 | 13 |
| 6 | Brian Shaw | United States | 0m 56.73 | 5 | 13 |
| 7 | Adam Bishop | United Kingdom | 0m 57.78 | 4 | 9 |
| 8 | JF Caron | Canada | 0m 57.84 | 3 | 9 |
| 9 | Konstantine Janashia | Georgia | 1m 0.15 | 2 | 11 |
| 10 | Bobby Thompson | United States | 1m 2.31 | 1 | 5 |

=== Event 3: REIGN Keg Toss ===
- Weight: 15 kilograms (33 lb) for maximum height
- Athletes get three attempts for each height

| # | Name | Nationality | Height | Event Pts | Overall Pts |
|---|---|---|---|---|---|
| 1 | Brian Shaw | United States | 7.75 metres (25.4 ft) | 10 | 23 |
| 2 | Tom Stoltman | United Kingdom | 7.5 metres (25 ft) | 8.5 | 28.5 |
| 2 | Maxime Boudreault | Canada | 7.5 metres (25 ft) | 8.5 | 18.5 |
| 4 | Konstantine Janashia | Georgia | 7.26 metres (23.8 ft) | 7 | 18 |
| 5 | Luke Stoltman | United Kingdom | 6.75 metres (22.1 ft) | 4 | 17 |
| 5 | JF Caron | Canada | 6.75 metres (22.1 ft) | 4 | 13 |
| 5 | Adam Bishop | United Kingdom | 6.75 metres (22.1 ft) | 4 | 13 |
| 5 | Eyþór Ingólfsson Melsteð | Iceland | 6.75 metres (22.1 ft) | 4 | 13 |
| 5 | Bobby Thompson | United States | 6.75 metres (22.1 ft) | 4 | 9 |
| 10 | Trey Mitchell | United States | 6 metres (20 ft) | 1 | 12 |

=== Event 4: Max Log Lift ===
- Opening Weight: 170 kilograms (370 lb)

| # | Name | Nationality | Weight | Event Pts | Overall Pts |
|---|---|---|---|---|---|
| 1 | Luke Stoltman | United Kingdom | 215 kilograms (474 lb) | 10 | 27 |
| 2 | Maxime Boudreault | Canada | 205 kilograms (452 lb) | 8 | 26.5 |
| 2 | Trey Mitchell | United States | 205 kilograms (452 lb) | 8 | 20 |
| 2 | Bobby Thompson | United States | 205 kilograms (452 lb) | 8 | 17 |
| 5 | Brian Shaw | United States | 195 kilograms (430 lb) | 5 | 28 |
| 5 | Konstantine Janashia | Georgia | 195 kilograms (430 lb) | 5 | 23 |
| 5 | JF Caron | Canada | 195 kilograms (430 lb) | 5 | 18 |
| 8 | Tom Stoltman | United Kingdom | 185 kilograms (408 lb) | 2.5 | 31 |
| 8 | Eyþór Ingólfsson Melsteð | Iceland | 185 kilograms (408 lb) | 2.5 | 15.5 |
| 10 | Adam Bishop | United Kingdom | 170 kilograms (370 lb) | 1 | 14 |

=== Event 5: KNAACK Deadlift ===
- Weight: 350 kilograms (770 lb) for repetitions
- Time Limit: 60 seconds

| # | Name | Nationality | Repetitions | Event Pts | Overall Pts |
|---|---|---|---|---|---|
| 1 | Trey Mitchell | United States | 10 | 9 | 29 |
| 1 | JF Caron | Canada | 10 | 9 | 27 |
| 1 | Adam Bishop | United Kingdom | 10 | 9 | 23 |
| 4 | Brian Shaw | United States | 9 | 6.5 | 34.5 |
| 4 | Bobby Thompson | United States | 9 | 6.5 | 23.5 |
| 6 | Tom Stoltman | United Kingdom | 8 | 4.5 | 35.5 |
| 6 | Konstantine Janashia | Georgia | 8 | 4.5 | 27.5 |
| 8 | Eyþór Ingólfsson Melsteð | Iceland | 7 | 3 | 18.5 |
| 9 | Luke Stoltman | United Kingdom | 6 | 2 | 29 |
| 10 | Maxime Boudreault | Canada | 3 | 1 | 27.5 |

=== Event 6: Atlas Stones ===
- Weight: 5 stones ranging from 140–210 kilograms (310–460 lb)

| # | Name | Nationality | Time (sec) | Event Pts | Overall Pts |
|---|---|---|---|---|---|
| 1 | Tom Stoltman | United Kingdom | 5 in 20.21 | 10 | 45.5 |
| 2 | Maxime Boudreault | Canada | 5 in 28.63 | 9 | 36.5 |
| 3 | Brian Shaw | United States | 5 in 31.45 | 8 | 42.5 |
| 4 | JF Caron | Canada | 5 in 37.17 | 7 | 34 |
| 5 | Trey Mitchell | United States | 5 in 37.26 | 6 | 35 |
| 6 | Konstantine Janashia | Georgia | 4 in 20.81 | 5 | 32.5 |
| 7 | Adam Bishop | United Kingdom | 4 in 30.61 | 4 | 27 |
| 8 | Luke Stoltman | United Kingdom | 4 in 33.50 | 3 | 32 |
| 9 | Eyþór Ingólfsson Melsteð | Iceland | 4 in 33.65 | 2 | 20.5 |
| 10 | Bobby Thompson | United States | Withdrew | 0 | 23.5 |

== Final standings ==
| # | Name | Nationality | Pts |
|---|---|---|---|
| 1st place, gold medalist(s) | Tom Stoltman | United Kingdom | 45.5 |
| 2nd place, silver medalist(s) | Brian Shaw | United States | 42.5 |
| 3rd place, bronze medalist(s) | Maxime Boudreault | Canada | 36.5 |
| 4 | Trey Mitchell | United States | 35 |
| 5 | JF Caron | Canada | 34 |
| 6 | Konstantine Janashia | Georgia | 32.5 |
| 7 | Luke Stoltman | United Kingdom | 32 |
| 8 | Adam Bishop | United Kingdom | 27 |
| 9 | Bobby Thompson | United States | 23.5 |
| 10 | Eyþór Ingólfsson Melsteð | Iceland | 20.5 |

== Records ==
Mark Felix appeared in his record 16th WSM contest.

Brian Shaw qualified for his record 13th WSM final, breaking a tie held by him and Zydrunas Savickas. All 13 of these finals were consecutive, another record. He also extended his own record by appearing in his 14th consecutive WSM contest, and equalled the record 10 podium finishes of Savickas.

Travis Ortmayer set a record for longest absence between consecutive WSM appearances of 10 years, last competing at the 2011 contest. This broke the previous record of 8 years (2003–2011) held by Lithuania's Vidas Blekaitis.

In the third event of the final, 4 men broke the previous world record in the 15 kg Keg Toss for height, which stood at 7.25m (held by Brian Shaw). Konstantine Janashia achieved 7.26m, whereas Tom Stoltman and Maxime Boudreault reached 7.50m, but Shaw reset his record at 7.75m.

| Preceded by 2020 World's Strongest Man | 2021 World's Strongest Man | Succeeded by 2022 World's Strongest Man |
