= Kevin Faires =

American strongman (born 1990)

Personal information
- Born: Kevin Faires; February 4, 1990 (age 36) United States
- Occupation: Strongman
- Height: 6 ft 2 in (1.88 m)
- Weight: 287 lb (130 kg)

Sport
- Sport: Strongman
Medal record
Representing United States
World's Strongest Man
Qualified	2019 World's Strongest Man
7th	2020 World's Strongest Man
Qualified	2021 World's Strongest Man
Qualified	2022 World's Strongest Man
Qualified	2023 World's Strongest Man
Qualified	2024 World's Strongest Man
Arnold Strongman Classic
9th	2023 Arnold Strongman Classic
Rogue Invitational
9th	2022 Rogue Invitational
Shaw Classic
9th	2020 Shaw Classic
4th	2021 Shaw Classic
6th	2022 Shaw Classic
9th	2023 Strongest Man on Earth
Giants Live
3rd	2018 North American Open
2nd	2019 North American Open
11th	2019 World Tour Open
4th	2021 World Tour Open
3rd	2022 World Tour Open
9th	2023 Strongman Classic
Arnold Pro Strongman World Series
10th	2019 Africa
10th	2019 Forts de Warwick
America's Strongest Man
3rd	2024

Kevin Faires (born February 4, 1990) is an American professional strongman. Noted for his grip strength, he was the former world record holder of the Rogue replica Dinnie Stones walk, carrying the two stones weighing a combined weight of 333 kg (734 lb) for a distance of 9.63 metres (31 ft 7 in).

== Early life ==
Faires played as a lineman in high school football, and also participated in baseball and wrestling. He excelled in wrestling and while in high school developed his dedication to strength training after discovering it helped him overcome a relative lack of size.

== Career ==
=== Strongman ===
In his debut year Faires won the 2016 U105 Strongman World Championship held in Kokkola, Finland. He repeated his success in the U105 division winning the 2017 Arnold Amateur Strongman World Championships. Five years later, Faires won his third title at the 2022 Cerberus Strength Presents The Depth Before Dishonor Winter Wasteland Classic held in Orem, Utah where he bench-pressed 529 lbs. The following year, Faires competed in the 2023 Arnold Strongman Classic Rogue Record Breakers (RRB) contest, during which he broke the Dinnie Stones walk world record, carrying the two stones 9.63 metres (31 ft 7 in). He also twice held the Nicol Stones walk world record.

=== Personal records ===
- Elephant bar Deadlift – 408.5 kg (901 lb)
- Log press – 191 kg (421 lb)
- Axle press – 167.5 kg (369 lb)
- Dinnie Stones carry – 333 kg (734 lb) for 9.63 metres (31 ft 7 in) (former world record)
- Nicol Stones carry – 252 kg (556 lb) for 24.61 metres (80 ft 9 in) (former world record)
- Shield carry – 193 kg (425 lb) for 47.47 metres (155 ft 9 in)

== Personal life ==
Faires is married and lives with his 3 children and wife in Provo, Utah.
