= 2022 Europe's Strongest Man =

Competition information
- Dates: 2 April 2022
- Venue: First Direct Arena
- Location: Leeds
- Country: United Kingdom
- Athletes participating: 12
- Nations participating: 9

Champion(s)
- (Ukraine) Oleksii Novikov

The 2022 Europe's Strongest Man was a strongman competition that took place in Leeds, England on 2 April 2022 at the First Direct Arena. This event was part of the 2022 Giants live tour.

Oleksii Novikov won the competition to win his second Europe's Strongest Man title.

== Participants ==
- Luke Stoltman (UK)
- Pavlo Kordiyaka (UKR)
- Oleksii Novikov (UKR)
- Eyþór Ingólfsson Melsteð (ISL)
- Rauno Heinla (EST)
- Pa O'Dwyer (IRL)
- Konstantine Janashia (GEO)
- Shane Flowers (UK)
- Marius Lalas (LTU)
- Gavin Bilton (UK)
- Aivars Šmaukstelis (LAT)
- Kelvin de Ruiter (NED)

== Results of events ==
=== Event 1: Max Log Lift ===
#	Athlete	Nation	Weight	Event Points	Overall Points
1	Luke Stoltman	United Kingdom	218 kilograms (481 lb)	12	12
2	Oleksii Novikov	Ukraine	185 kilograms (408 lb)	10	10
2	Pavlo Kordiyaka	Ukraine	185 kilograms (408 lb)	10	10
2	Eyþór Ingólfsson Melsteð	Iceland	185 kilograms (408 lb)	10	10
5	Konstantine Janashia	Georgia	170 kilograms (370 lb)	6.5	6.5
5	Shane Flowers	United Kingdom	170 kilograms (370 lb)	6.5	6.5
5	Marius Lalas	Lithuania	170 kilograms (370 lb)	6.5	6.5
5	Gavin Bilton	United Kingdom	170 kilograms (370 lb)	6.5	6.5
—	Aivars Šmaukstelis	Latvia	N/A	0	0
—	Kelvin de Ruiter	Netherlands	N/A	0	0
—	Pa O'Dwyer	Ireland	N/A	0	0
—	Rauno Heinla	Estonia	N/A	0	0

=== Event 2: Deadlift ladder ===
- Weight: 5 bar ladder from 300–400 kilograms (660–880 lb)
- Time Limit: 75 seconds

#	Athlete	Nation	Time	Event Points	Overall Points
1	Konstantine Janashia	Georgia	4 in 35.04	12	18.5
2	Rauno Heinla	Estonia	4 in 39.49	11	11
3	Oleksii Novikov	Ukraine	4 in 41.92	10	20
4	Marius Lalas	Lithuania	4 in 48.2	9	15.5
5	Luke Stoltman	United Kingdom	4 in 55.21	8	20
6	Shane Flowers	United Kingdom	4 in 1:01.03	7	13.5
7	Pa O'Dwyer	Ireland	3 in 28.7	6	6
8	Aivars Šmaukstelis	Latvia	3 in 29.23	5	5
9	Eyþór Ingólfsson Melsteð	Iceland	3 in 32.2	4	14
10	Gavin Bilton	United Kingdom	3 in 38.4	3	9.5
11	Kelvin de Ruiter	Netherlands	3 in 40.5	2	2
12	Pavlo Kordiyaka	Ukraine	3 in 48.76	1	11

=== Event 3: Carry and Drag ===
- Weight: 120 kilograms (260 lb) anchor and chain drag
- Course Length: 20 metres (66 ft)
- Time Limit: 60 seconds

#	Athlete	Nation	Time	Event Points	Overall Points
1	Oleksii Novikov	Ukraine	26.26	12	32
2	Kelvin de Ruiter	Netherlands	26.50	11	13
3	Shane Flowers	United Kingdom	27.45	10	23.5
4	Pavlo Kordiyaka	Ukraine	28.13	9	20
5	Luke Stoltman	United Kingdom	28.40	8	28
6	Aivars Šmaukstelis	Latvia	29.03	7	12
7	Pa O'Dwyer	Ireland	29.54	6	12
8	Marius Lalas	Lithuania	30.11	5	20.5
9	Eyþór Ingólfsson Melsteð	Iceland	33.51	4	18
10	Konstantine Janashia	Georgia	35.28	3	21.5
11	Rauno Heinla (Note: Rauno Heinla sustained an injury in this event and took no further part in the competition.)	Estonia	35.87	2	13
12	Gavin Bilton	United Kingdom	42.22	1	10.5

=== Event 4: Power Stairs ===
- Weight: 4 implements weighing 200 kilograms (440 lb), 210 kilograms (460 lb), 225 kilograms (496 lb) and 250 kilograms (550 lb) have to be lifted up 3 stairs each
- Time Limit: 60 seconds

#	Athlete	Nation	Time	Event Points	Overall Points
1	Aivars Šmaukstelis	Latvia	27.20	12	24
2	Pavlo Kordiyaka	Ukraine	28.09	11	31
3	Shane Flowers	United Kingdom	29.27	10	33.5
4	Luke Stoltman	United Kingdom	30.10	9	37
5	Oleksii Novikov	Ukraine	30.25	8	40
6	Konstantine Janashia	Georgia	31.05	7	28.5
7	Marius Lalas	Lithuania	32.67	6	26.5
8	Kelvin de Ruiter	Netherlands	35.56	5	18
9	Pa O'Dwyer	Ireland	40.16	4	16
10	Eyþór Ingólfsson Melsteð	Iceland	48.35	3	21
11	Gavin Bilton	United Kingdom	51.81	2	12.5

=== Event 5: Atlas Stones ===
- Weight: 5 stone series ranging from 100–180 kilograms (220–400 lb).

#	Athlete	Nation	Time	Event Points	Overall Points
1	Oleksii Novikov	Ukraine	5 in 20.44	12	52
2	Luke Stoltman	United Kingdom	5 in 20.69	11	48
3	Konstantine Janashia	Georgia	5 in 24.02	10	38.5
4	Aivars Šmaukstelis	Latvia	5 in 24.34	9	33
5	Eyþór Ingólfsson Melsteð	Iceland	5 in 25.02	8	29
6	Gavin Bilton	United Kingdom	5 in 25.28	7	19.5
7	Pavlo Kordiyaka	Ukraine	5 in 25.31	6	37
8	Kelvin de Ruiter	Netherlands	5 in 30.60	5	23
9	Pa O'Dwyer	Ireland	5 in 31.23	4	20
10	Shane Flowers	United Kingdom	4 in 17.06	3	36.5
11	Marius Lalas	Lithuania	4 in 17.98	2	28.5

== Final results ==
#	Athlete	Nation	Points
1st place, gold medalist(s)	Oleksii Novikov	Ukraine	52
2nd place, silver medalist(s)	Luke Stoltman	United Kingdom	48
3rd place, bronze medalist(s)	Konstantine Janashia	Georgia	38.5
4	Pavlo Kordiyaka	Ukraine	37
5	Shane Flowers	United Kingdom	36.5
6	Aivars Šmaukstelis	Latvia	33
7	Eyþór Ingólfsson Melsteð	Iceland	29
8	Marius Lalas	Lithuania	28.5
9	Kelvin de Ruiter	Netherlands	23
10	Pa O'Dwyer	Ireland	20
11	Gavin Bilton	United Kingdom	19.5
12	Rauno Heinla	Estonia	13

Preceded by 2021 Europe's Strongest Man	Europe's Strongest Man	Succeeded by 2023 Europe's Strongest Man
