= 2023 Europe's Strongest Man =

Competition information
- Dates: 1 April 2023
- Venue: First Direct Arena
- Location: Leeds
- Country: United Kingdom
- Athletes participating: 13
- Nations participating: 7

Champion(s)
- (Ukraine) Pavlo Kordiyaka

The 2023 Europe's Strongest Man was a strongman competition that took place in Leeds, England on 1 April 2023 at the First Direct Arena. This event was part of the 2023 Giants live tour.

Pavlo Kordiyaka won the competition with his fellow countryman Oleksii Novikov finishing in second place.

== Participants ==
- Pavlo Kordiyaka (UKR)
- Oleksii Novikov (UKR)
- Eyþór Ingólfsson Melsteð (ISL)
- Aivars Šmaukstelis (LAT)
- Paul Smith (UK)
- Graham Hicks (UK)
- Dennis Kohlruss (GER)
- Konstantine Janashia (GEO)
- Gavin Bilton (UK)
- Jean-Stephen Coraboeuf (FRA)
- Shane Flowers (UK)
- Pa O'Dwyer (IRL)
- Adam Bishop (UK)

== Results of events ==
=== Event 1: Log Ladder ===
- Weight: 5 log ladder from 120–180 kilograms (260–400 lb)
- Time Limit: 60 seconds

#	Athlete	Nation	Time	Event Points	Overall Points
1	Pavlo Kordiyaka	Ukraine	5 in 52.55	13	13
2	Oleksii Novikov	Ukraine	4 in 38.35	12	12
3	Eyþór Ingólfsson Melsteð	Iceland	4 in 40.98	11	11
4	Aivars Šmaukstelis	Latvia	4 in 43.58	10	10
5	Paul Smith	United Kingdom	3 in 27.83	9	9
6	Graham Hicks (Note: After this event Graham Hicks withdrew due to illness and took no further part in the competition.)	United Kingdom	3 in 29.09	8	8
7	Dennis Kohlruss	Germany	3 in 30.66	7	7
8	Konstantine Janashia	Georgia	3 in 33.51	6	6
9	Gavin Bilton	United Kingdom	3 in 33.54	5	5
10	Jean-Stephen Coraboeuf	France	3 in 37.27	4	4
11	Shane Flowers	United Kingdom	2 in 12.20	3	3
12	Pa O'Dwyer	Ireland	2 in 14.41	2	2
13	Adam Bishop	United Kingdom	2 in 17.01	1	1

=== Event 2: Load & Push ===
- 1 x Anvil, 1 x Sandbag, 1x Tyre placed at various points along the course to be carried and placed in a wheelbarrow which is then to be pushed to the other end of the course

#	Athlete	Nation	Time	Event Points	Overall Points
1	Pavlo Kordiyaka	Ukraine	44.14	13	26
2	Oleksii Novikov	Ukraine	46.07	12	24
3	Adam Bishop	United Kingdom	49.80	11	12
4	Aivars Šmaukstelis	Latvia	50.26	10	20
5	Shane Flowers	United Kingdom	50.94	9	12
6	Gavin Bilton	United Kingdom	51.75	8	13
7	Pa O'Dwyer	Ireland	52.19	7	9
8	Paul Smith	United Kingdom	52.69	6	15
9	Konstantine Janashia	Georgia	54.36	5	11
10	Eyþór Ingólfsson Melsteð	Iceland	54.89	4	15
11	Jean-Stephen Coraboeuf	France	55.39	3	7
12	Dennis Kohlruss	Germany	1:02.54	2	9

=== Event 3: Deadlift ===
- Weight: 350 kilograms (770 lb)
- Time Limit: 60 seconds

#	Athlete	Nation	Time	Event Points	Overall Points
1	Oleksii Novikov	Ukraine	9	12.5	36.5
1	Adam Bishop	United Kingdom	9	12.5	24.5
3	Aivars Šmaukstelis	Latvia	7	10.5	30.5
3	Pa O'Dwyer	Ireland	7	10.5	19.5
5	Shane Flowers	United Kingdom	6	8.5	20.5
5	Eyþór Ingólfsson Melsteð	Iceland	6	8.5	23.5
7	Pavlo Kordiyaka	Ukraine	3	6.5	32.5
7	Konstantine Janashia	Georgia	3	6.5	17.5
9	Gavin Bilton (Note: After this event Gavin Bilton withdrew and took no further part in the competition.)	United Kingdom	2	4.5	17.5
9	Dennis Kohlruss	Germany	2	4.5	13.5
11	Paul Smith	United Kingdom	1	2.5	17.5
11	Jean-Stephen Coraboeuf	France	1	2.5	9.5

=== Event 4: Conan's Wheel ===
- Athletes walk in circles holding the handle of the wheel that is loaded with an ATV for the longest distance.
- Note: Distance is measured in degrees

#	Athlete	Nation	Time	Event Points	Overall Points
1	Pavlo Kordiyaka	Ukraine	1009°	13	45.5
2	Oleksii Novikov	Ukraine	897°	12	48.5
3	Eyþór Ingólfsson Melsteð	Iceland	760°	11	34.5
4	Pa O'Dwyer	Ireland	733°	10	29.5
5	Adam Bishop	United Kingdom	731°	9	33.5
6	Aivars Šmaukstelis	Latvia	710°	8	38.5
7	Shane Flowers	United Kingdom	640°	6.5	27
7	Dennis Kohlruss	Germany	640°	6.5	20
9	Paul Smith	United Kingdom	582°	5	22.5
10	Konstantine Janashia	Georgia	363°	4	21.5
11	Jean-Stephen Coraboeuf	France	173°	3	12.5

=== Event 5: Atlas Stones ===
- Weight: 5 stone series ranging from 100–180 kilograms (220–400 lb)
- Time Limit: 60 seconds

#	Athlete	Nation	Time	Event Points	Overall Points
1	Aivars Šmaukstelis	Latvia	5 in 20.47	13	51.5
2	Pavlo Kordiyaka	Ukraine	5 in 21.76	12	57.5
3	Eyþór Ingólfsson Melsteð	Iceland	5 in 22.10	11	45.5
4	Shane Flowers	United Kingdom	5 in 22.73	10	37
5	Konstantine Janashia	Georgia	5 in 23.69	9	30.5
6	Adam Bishop	United Kingdom	5 in 26.32	8	41.5
7	Pa O'Dwyer	Ireland	5 in 30.60	7	36.5
8	Dennis Kohlruss	Germany	5 in 40.50	6	26
9	Oleksii Novikov	Ukraine	4 in 18.00	5	53.5
10	Jean-Stephen Coraboeuf	France	4 in 31.15	4	16.5
11	Paul Smith	United Kingdom	2 in 15.70	3	25.5

== Final results ==
#	Athlete	Nation	Points
1st place, gold medalist(s)	Pavlo Kordiyaka	Ukraine	57.5
2nd place, silver medalist(s)	Oleksii Novikov	Ukraine	53.5
3rd place, bronze medalist(s)	Aivars Šmaukstelis	Latvia	51.5
4	Eyþór Ingólfsson Melsteð	Iceland	45.5
5	Adam Bishop	United Kingdom	41.5
6	Shane Flowers	United Kingdom	37
7	Pa O'Dwyer	Ireland	36.5
8	Konstantine Janashia	Georgia	30.5
9	Dennis Kohlruss	Germany	26
10	Paul Smith	United Kingdom	25.5
11	Gavin Bilton	United Kingdom	17.5
12	Jean-Stephen Coraboeuf	France	16.5
13	Graham Hicks	United Kingdom	8

Preceded by 2022 Europe's Strongest Man	Europe's Strongest Man	Succeeded by 2024 Europe's Strongest Man
