= Aivars Šmaukstelis =

Latvian strongman

Personal information
- Nationality: Latvian
- Born: 20 September 1987 (age 38)
- Occupation: Strongman
- Height: 6 ft 2 in (1.88 m)
- Weight: 145–148 kg (320–326 lb)
Medal record
Strongman
Representing Latvia
World's Strongest Man
Qualified	2018 World's Strongest Man
Qualified	2019 World's Strongest Man
8th	2020 World's Strongest Man
Qualified	2021 World's Strongest Man
Qualified	2022 World's Strongest Man
Qualified	2023 World's Strongest Man
10th	2024 World's Strongest Man
World's Ultimate Strongman
3rd	2020 World's Ultimate Strongman
3rd	2021 World's Ultimate Strongman
World Strongman Championships
1st	2022 World Championships
1st	2023 World Championships
Europe's Strongest Man
6th	2022 Europe's Strongest Man
3rd	2023 Europe's Strongest Man
2nd	2024 Europe's Strongest Man
9th	2025 Europe's Strongest Man
Shaw Classic
9th	2021 Shaw Classic
7th	2022 Shaw Classic
12th	2023 Strongest Man on Earth
13th	2024 Strongest Man on Earth
World's Strongest Viking
4th	2018 World's Strongest Viking
2nd	2020 World's Strongest Viking
Giants Live
10th	2021 Strongman Classic
2nd	2022 World Tour Finals
8th	2024 World Open
Arnold Pro Strongman World Series
4th	2019 Warwick Strongman Festival
8th	2019 Arnold Europe
Strongman Champions League
8th	2014 SCL Latvia
5th	2015 SCL Latvia
7th	2015 SCL Savickas Classic
1st	2016 SCL Latvia
1st	2016 SCL Serbia
2nd	2016 SCL Finland
6th	2017 SCL Holland
3rd	2017 SCL Serbia
1st	2017 SCL Romania
6th	2017 SCL World Finals
2nd	2018 SCL Finland
3rd	2018 SCL Serbia
1st	2018 SCL Romania
3rd	2018 SCL World Finals
2nd	2019 SCL FIBO
1st	2019 SCL Russia
2nd	2019 SCL Finland
2nd	2019 SCL World Record Breakers
1st	2019 SCL World Finals
2nd	2020 SCL Finland
1st	2021 SCL Romania
2nd	2021 SCL World Finals
1st	2022 SCL World Record Breakers
1st	2022 SCL England
2nd	2022 SCL Poland
1st	2022 SCL Gibraltar
1st	2022 SCL World Finals
3rd	2023 SCL Finland
1st	2023 SCL Holland
1st	2023 SCL World Record Breakers
4th	2023 SCL Poland
2nd	2023 SCL World Finals
1st	2024 SCL Iceman
2nd	2024 SCL Holland
1st	2024 SCL World Record Breakers
3rd	2024 SCL World Finals
1st	2025 SCL Latvia
2nd	2025 SCL Latvia
3rd	2025 SCL Hungary
1st	2025 SCL Dubai
Marijampolė International
2nd	2017 Marijampolė International
1st	2018 Marijampolė International
1st	2020 Marijampolė International
Pasaulio Taurė
1st	2019 Pasaulio Taurė
2nd	2020 Pasaulio Taurė
1st	2021 Pasaulio Taurė
Savickas Classic
3rd	2016 Savickas Classic
1st	2020 Savickas Classic
Dainis Zageris Cup
1st	2023 Dainis Zageris Cup

Aivars Šmaukstelis (born 20 September 1987) is a Latvian strongman.

Having competed in 86 International strongman competitions, he has won 28 of them, making him the fourth most decorated strongman in history.

== Career ==
Šmaukstelis began his career at the age of 16 as a powerlifter. After training for a couple of years, he achieved a personal best of 800 kg (1,764 lb) total (equipped/ multi ply category) at the age of 18. Following advice from his coach, he tried strongman and progressively excelled, winning Latvia's Strongest Man and entering the Strongman Champions League hailing from its IFSA roots. It gave Šmaukstelis the opportunity for international exposure, competing against the best strongmen in the world.

Having competed prolifically in the Strongman Champions League since 2014 throughout many Grand Prix competitions in Latvia, Germany, Netherlands, Finland, Norway, Serbia, Russia, Poland, Romania, Hungary, Gibraltar, Bosnia and Herzegovina, England and U.A.E., Šmaukstelis won 17 international titles, 11 silver and 6 bronze medals. His other international titles include World Strongman Championships, Marijampolė International, Pasaulio Taurė, Savickas Classic and Dainis Zageris Cup. He is also a World's Strongest Man 8th-place and 10th-place winner (2020 & 2024), two time World's Ultimate Strongman bronze medalist (2020 & 2021), Europe's Strongest Man silver (2024) and bronze medalist (2023) and Giants Live World Tour Finals Silver Medalist (2022).

Šmaukstelis is a strongman with several events including stonelifting. Together with a noteworthy grip strength, he is also noted for his prowess in distance and endurance based events. He also holds the Guinness World Records for the fastest 10 x kegs keg toss (18–25 kg) over a 15-foot bar in 21.02 seconds and fastest 15 steps Power Stairs with 225 kg (496 lb).

== Personal records ==
- Deadlift - 390 kg (860 lb) and 372.5 kg (821 lb) (Raw)
- Hummer tyre Deadlift (from 15" height) - 408 kg (899 lb)
- Squat - 317.5 kg (700 lb) x 10 reps
- Log press - 181 kg (399 lb)
- Log press (for reps) - 140 kg (309 lb) x 9 reps
- Viking press - 160 kg (353 lb) x 15 reps
- Circus Dumbbell press - 125 kg (276 lb)
- Circus Dumbbell press (for reps) - 95 kg (209 lb) x 10 reps
- Manhood Stone (Max Atlas Stone) – 215 kg (474 lb) over 4 ft bar
- Atlas Stones - 5 Stones weighing 110–180 kg (242–397 lb) in 17.10 secs (World Record)
- Natural stone lift to platform – 5 Rocks ranging from 160 to 210 kilograms (353–463 lb) in 28.94 seconds
- Keg toss – 15 kg (33 lb) over 6.71 metres (22 ft 0 in) (2024 Strongest Man on Earth)
- Keg toss – 10 kegs (18–25 kg (40–55 lb)) over 4.57 metres (15 ft 0 in) in 21.02 seconds (World Record)
- Power Stairs (3 x 225 kg (496 lb) Duck walks / total of 15 steps) – 31.16 seconds (2024 Guinness World Records, Italy) (World Record)
- Power Stairs (200 kg (441 lb), 225 kg (496 lb) & 250 kg (551 lb) Duck walks / total of 15 steps) - 41.67 seconds
- Super Yoke – 425 kg (937 lb) for 25 m (82 ft) in 10.75 secs (2023 Strongman Champions League Holland) (World Record)
- Frame carry (with straps) – 320 kg (705 lb) 30m course in 9.31 seconds (2019 SCL Russia) (World Record)
- Basque circle (Conan's wheel) - 300 kg (661 lb) for 860° rotation
