= 105kg Strongman World Championships =

International strongman competition

The 105 kg Strongman World Championships is a (mostly) annual competition featuring strength athletes from all over the world, competing for the title of the strongest man in the world with a body weight below 105 kg. Created initially by the International Federation of Strength Athletes, the series was eventually moved to become part of the Strongman Champions League, a series created by two former IFSA members Ilkka Kinnunen and Marcel Mostertas.

== Champions ==
Year	Champion	Runner-up	Third place	Location
2004	(Finland) Janne Hartikainen	(Finland) Jyrki Rantanen	(Finland) Aki Katajamaki	Imatra, Finland
2005	(Finland) Janne Hartikainen	(England) Darren Sadler	(Lithuania) Alvidas Brazdzius	Panyu, China
2006	(England) Darren Sadler	(Latvia) Maris Rosenthals	(United States) Kirk Nowack	(United States) Tulsa, USA
2007	(Finland) Janne Hartikainen	(Lithuania) Alvidas Brazdzius	(Latvia) Maris Rosenthals	Panyu, China
2008	Event not held			
2009	(Ukraine) Vitaliy Gerasimov	(Russia) Aleksander Mantserov	(Finland) Topi Fryfeld	Kyiv, Ukraine
2010	(Ukraine) Vitaliy Gerasimov	(Ukraine) Mikhailo Melnikov	(Lithuania) Marius Lalas	Kyiv, Ukraine
2011–2012	Event not held			
2013	(England) Ben Kelsey	(Ukraine) Oleksandre Kryvchenkov	(Poland) Marcin Sendwicki	Vyshgorod, Ukraine
2014	Event not held			
2015	(England) Ben Kelsey	(Ukraine) Volodymyr Reksha	(Norway) Jørgen Skaug Aukland	Spydeberg, Norway
2016	(United States) Kevin Faires	(Finland) Paavo Paaso	(Sweden) Ola Nilsson	Kokkola, Finland
2016 (OSG)	(Poland) Marcin Sendwicki	(United States) Sean Demarinis	(Latvia) Maris Rosenthals	Belfast, Northern Ireland
2017 (SCL)	(New Zealand) Jayden Hill	(Finland) Mikka Nikkonen	(Finland) Paavo Paaso	Kokkola, Finland
2017 (OSG)	(United States) Andrew Clayton	(United States) Nicolas Cambi	(United States) Anthony Fuhrman	Raleigh, United States
2018 (SCL)	(Finland) Mikko Annala	(Ukraine) Volodymyr Reksha	(Latvia) Maris Krievelis	Liperi, Finland
2018 (OSG)	(United States) Anthony Fuhrman	(Canada) Derrek Cox	(Australia) Tyson Morrissey	Raleigh, United States
2019 (OSG)	(United States) Anthony Fuhrman	(Canada) Isaac Maze	(Poland) Marcin Sendwicki	Daytona Beach, United States
2020	Event not held			
2021 (OSG)	(United States) Nicolas Cambi	(United States) Chad Kurian	(United States) Justin Loy	Daytona Beach, United States
2022 (OSG)	(United States) Andrew Clayton	(United States) Dan Hughes	(United States) Nicholas Hein	Daytona Beach, United States
2023 (OSG)	(United States) Dan Hughes	(Austria) Emanuel Pescari	(Taiwan) Jeffrey Lee	Charleston, United States
2024 (OSG)	(United States) Alec Soukup	(United States) Nicholas Hein	(United States) Steven Bradley	Madison, United States
2025 (OSG)	(Austria) Emanuel Pescari	(Nigeria) Devon "DJ" Doggett	(United States) Brandon Burley	Arlington, Texas, United States

== Individual Results ==
=== 2007 ===
In 2007 the World Championships were held in China, with 17 athletes from 16 different countries participated in the event. The competitions consisted of 10 events over the course of 1 week.

Position	Name	Country	Points
1	Janne Hartikainen	(Finland)	143.5
2	Alvidas Brazdzius	(Lithuania)	133.5
3	Maris Rosenthals	(Latvia)	129
4	Sergi Konyushok	(Ukraine)	124.5
5	Zdravko Zanev	(Bulgaria)	123
6	Gert Gorsanov	(Estonia)	108
7	Jason Scheepers	(South Africa)	99.5
8	Danny Andersson	(Sweden)	98.5
9	Piotr Piechowiak	(Poland)	93
10	Kevin Nowack	(United States)	93
11	Fouad Hsaini	(Netherlands)	85.5
12	Janos Kezler	(Hungary)	74.5
13	Gerhard Trawöger	(Austria)	66.5
14	Patrik Baboumian	(Germany)	64
15	Robert Scott	(England)	40.5
16	Min Hyogun	(South Korea)	26,5
17	Papp Gyula	(Hungary)	22

=== 2009 ===
In 2009 and 2010 the contest was held in Kiev, Ukraine during the same weekend as the SCL Finals, with co-organizers Vladimir & Olena Kiba from the Ukrainian Federation of Strength Athletes (UFSA).

Position	Name	Country	Points
1	Vitaliy Gerasimov	(Ukraine)	70
2	Mikhailo Melnikov	(Ukraine)	68
3	Marius Lalas	(Lithuania)	64
4	Gert Gorshanov	(Estonia)	63
5	Aleksander Mantserov	(Russia)	58
6	Justin Blake	(United States)	37
7	Alexey Vishnitsky	(Ukraine)	34.5
8	Maris Blumfelds	(Latvia)	34
9	Patrik Baboumian	(Germany)	31
10	Paul Wood	(England)	25.5
11	Josef Masaryk	(Slovakia)	17
12	Rami Koski	(Finland)	9

=== 2010 ===
Position	Name	Country	Points
1	Vitaliy Gerasimov	(Ukraine)	55
2	Aleksander Mantserov	(Russia)	54
3	Topi Fryfeld	(Finland)	35.5
4	Oleksander Krivchenkov	(Ukraine)	34.5
5	Alexey Vishnitsky	(Ukraine)	31.5
6	Rori Scheepers	(South Africa)	31
7	Tomas Haijnal	(Hungary)	25.5
8	Harri Peltomaa	(Finland)	25
9	Maris Blumfeld	(Latvia)	9
10	Ladislav Zsemlye	(Slovakia)	7

=== 2013 ===
Position	Name	Country	Points
1	Ben Kelsey	(England)	60
2	Oleksandre Kryvchenkov	(Ukraine)	56.5
3	Marcin Sendwicki	(Poland)	53.5
4	Mykhailo Hodyakov	(Ukraine)	39
5	Dalius Ziminskas	(Lithuania)	38
6	Sean Demarinis	(United States)	37
7	Vidar Daae Vikoyr	(Norway)	34.5
8	Johnny Wasisko	(United States)	33.5

=== 2015 ===
Position	Name	Country	Points
1	Ben Kelsey	(England)	53
2	Volodymyr Reksha	(Ukraine)	48
3	Jørgen Skaug Aukland	(Norway)	47.5
4	Marcin Sendwicki	(Poland)	44
	Jiří Groenman	(Czech Republic)	44
6	Antanas Ziuraskas	(Lithuania)	31
7	Adam Lane	(United States)	30
8	Tomasz Rzymkowski	(Poland)	22
9	Jiří Tkadlčík	(Czech Republic)	21
10	Johnny Wasiczko	(United States)	20.5
11	Oliver Nell	(Germany)	20
12	Paavo Paaso	(Finland)	4

=== 2016 ===
Position	Name	Country	Points
1	Kevin Faires	(United States)	55
2	Paavo Paaso	(Finland)	44
3	Ola Nilsson	(Sweden)	39
4	Patryk Przybyla	(Poland)	37.5
5	Mika Nikkonen	(Finland)	36.5
6	Jordan Donaldson	(United States)	36
7	Dhanni Moar	(Scotland)	31.5
8	Mindaugas Brazauskas	(Lithuania)	27.5
9	Frikkie Page	(South Africa)	23.5
10	Mikko Lahti	(Finland)	20.5
11	Harri Peltomaa	(Finland)	19.5
12	Henrik Henningson	(Sweden)	9.5

=== 2017 ===
Position	Name	Country	Points
1	Jayden Hill	(New Zealand)	48.5
2	Mika Nikkonen	(Finland)	47.5
3	Paavo Paaso	(Finland)	40
4	Mikko Lahti	(Finland)	36.5
5	Gary Piotrowski	(United States)	34.5
6	Tyson Morrison	(Australia)	34
7	Gaisha Pavlo	(Ukraine)	31
8	Dhanni Moar	(Scotland)	29.5
9	Jeffrey Lee	(United States)	27
10	Mikko Annala	(Finland)	26
11	Oliver Nell	(Germany)	20.5
12	John Emil Westby	(Norway)	13

== See also ==
- Strongman Champions League
- The World Log Lift Championships
