= Mykhailo Starov =

Ukrainian strongman

Personal information
- Born: 1973 (age 52–53)
- Occupation: Strongman
- Height: 5 ft 11 in (1.80 m)
- Weight: 125 kg (276 lb)
Medal record
Strongman
Representing Ukraine
Europe's Strongest Man
3rd	2005 Europe's Strongest Man
World Strongman Cup Federation
1st	2004 WSMC Russia
1st	2004 WSMC Spain
2nd	2004 WSMC Plattling-Luna Park
2nd	2004 WSMC European Masters
2nd	2005 WSMC Austria
3rd	2005 WSMC Germany
2nd	2006 WSMC Germany
United Strongman Series
1st	2005 USS Kyiv
1st	2005 USS Canada
1st	2005 USS Thailand
2nd	2005 USS Moscow
3rd	2005 USS Serbia
Ukraine's Strongest Man
2nd	2001 Ukraine's Strongest Man
2nd	2002 Ukraine's Strongest Man
2nd	2003 Ukraine's Strongest Man
2nd	2004 Ukraine's Strongest Man
1st	2005 Ukraine's Strongest Man

Mykhailo Starov is a competitive Strongman from Ukraine. Having competed in 24 International strongman competitions and winning 5 of them, Starov is among the 50 most decorated strongmen of all time.

He is a two-time World Strongman Cup Federation champion and a three-time United Strongman Series champion.

After emerging runner-up to Vasyl Virastyuk four times in a row from 2001 to 2004, Starov won 2005 Ukraine's Strongest Man and proceeded to secure third place in the 2005 Europe's Strongest Man competition behind Jarek Dymek and Janne Virtanen.

== Personal records ==
- Squat - 426 kg (939 lbs)
- Bench press - 230 kg (507 lbs)
- Deadlift - 340 kg (750 lbs)
- Log press - 150 kg (331 lbs)
