= Volodymyr Reksha =

Personal information
- Born: Володимир Рекша; 2 November 1982 (age 43) Lviv, Ukraine
- Weight: 108

Sport
- Sport: Strongman competitions
Medal record
Representing Ukraine
Ukraine's Strongest Man
2nd	2013
3rd	2015
Arnold Strongman Classic (up to 105 kg)
2nd	2015
World Strongman Championship (up to 110 kg)
3rd	2012
US World Championships (up to 105 kg)
1st	2014

Volodymyr Reksha (Ukrainian: Володимир Рекша; born 2 November 1982), is a Ukrainian strongman competitor.

Volodymyr was born in Lviv, Ukraine. He began strength training at an early age in local gym near his house. In 2003, he graduated from Lviv State University of Physical Culture. At the age of 21 he became a member of the Ukrainian weightlifting team. In 2010 began his career as a strongman. March 14, 2015 became a vice-champion (weight category up to 105 kg) at one of the most world prestigious tournaments, Arnold Strongman Classic 2015, arranged under the annual Arnold Schwarzenegger sports festival.
