= Ukraine's Strongest Man =

Annual strongman competition held in Ukraine

Tournament information
- Location: Ukraine
- Established: 1998
- Format: Multi-event competition

Current champion
- (Ukraine) Oleksandr Kochergin (2021)

Ukraine's Strongest Man (Ukrainian: Найсильніша людина України) is an annual strongman competition held in Ukraine, featuring exclusively Ukrainian athletes to determine the Strongest Ukrainian of the year.

Vasyl Virastyuk holds the record for most wins, winning the title 7 times. Oleksandr Lashyn has won the title 6 times and Oleksii Novikov 4 times.

Three of the competition winners have proceeded to become World's Strongest Man (2004, 2020) and Europe's Strongest Man (2022, 2023) champions.

== Champions Breakdown ==
Year	Champion	Runner-up	3rd place
1998	(Ukraine) Vasyl Virastyuk	(Ukraine) Roman Virastyuk	(Ukraine) Oleksandr Bahach
1999-2000	Event not held		
2001	(Ukraine) Vasyl Virastyuk	(Ukraine) Mykhailo Starov	(Ukraine) Yuriy Parkhomenko
2002	(Ukraine) Vasyl Virastyuk	(Ukraine) Mykhailo Starov	(To be confirmed)
2003	(Ukraine) Vasyl Virastyuk	(Ukraine) Mykhailo Starov	(Russia) Igor Pedan
2004	(Ukraine) Vasyl Virastyuk	(Ukraine) Mykhailo Starov	(Ukraine) Roman Novik
2005	(Ukraine) Mykhailo Starov	(Ukraine) Roman Novik	(Ukraine) Oleksandr Pekanov
2006	(Ukraine) Vasyl Virastyuk	(Ukraine) Vladimir Muraviov	(Ukraine) Sergiy Konyushok
2007	(Ukraine) Vasyl Virastyuk	(Ukraine) Viktor Yurchenko	(Ukraine) Volodymyr Muravlov
2008	(Ukraine) Oleksandr Lashyn	(Ukraine) Kostiantyn Ilin	(Ukraine) Serhiy Konyushok
2009	(Ukraine) Kostiantyn Ilin	(Ukraine) Oleksandr Lashyn	(Ukraine) Serhiy Konyushok
2010	(Ukraine) Oleksandr Lashyn	(Ukraine) Serhiy Konyushok	(Ukraine) Vitaliy Mikheyev
2011	(Ukraine) Oleksandr Lashyn	(Ukraine) Viktor Yurchenko	(Ukraine) Oleksandr Pekanov
2012	(Ukraine) Oleksandr Lashyn	(Ukraine) Vitaliy Mikheyev	(Ukraine) Boris Kurbatskiy
2013	(Ukraine) Oleksandr Lashyn	(Ukraine) Volodymyr Reksha	(Ukraine) Vitaliy Mikheyev
2014	(Ukraine) Kostiantyn Ilin	(Ukraine) Sergii Romanchuk	(Ukraine) Anton Dubrovskiy
2015	(Ukraine) Oleksandr Lashyn	(Poland) Rafal Kobylarz	(Ukraine) Volodymyr Reksha
2016	(Ukraine) Oleksii Novikov	(Ukraine) Oleksandr Lashyn	(Ukraine) Vitaly Gerasimov
2017	(Ukraine) Oleksii Novikov	(Ukraine) Oleksandr Kochergin	(Ukraine) Pavlo Gaysha
2018	(Ukraine) Oleksii Novikov	(Ukraine) Pavlo Kordiyaka	(Ukraine) Andriy Burshtyn
2019	(Ukraine) Oleksii Novikov	(Ukraine) Pavlo Kordiyaka	(Ukraine) Oleksandr Kochergin
2020	(Ukraine) Pavlo Kordiyaka	(Ukraine) Oleksii Novikov	(Ukraine) Oleksandr Kochergin
2021	(Ukraine) Oleksandr Kochergin	(Ukraine) Denis Berezhnyk	(Ukraine) Roman Grekov
2022-2025	Event not held		
