= Zach Hadge =

American strongman

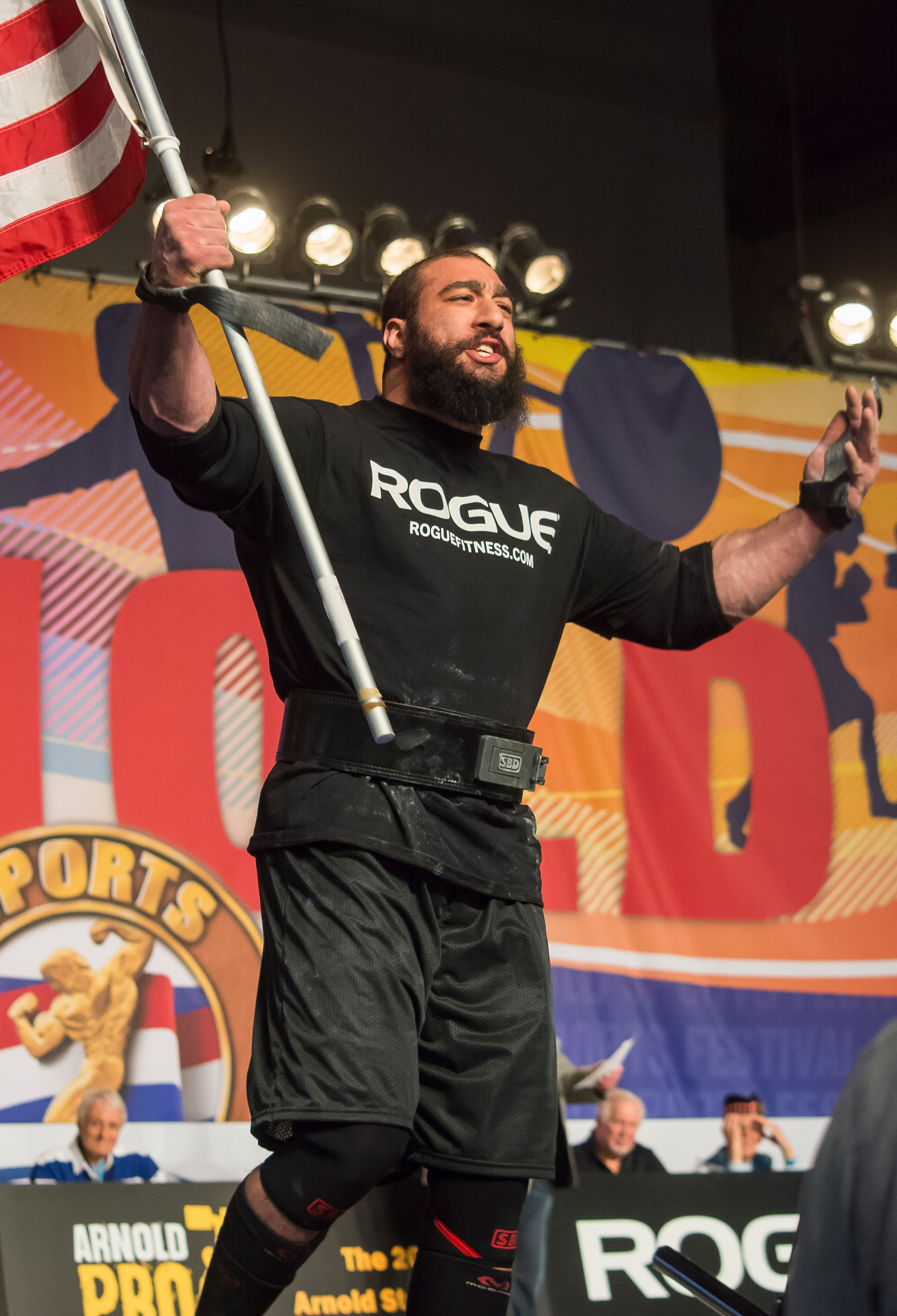
- Hadge at the 2017 Arnold Strongman Classic

Personal information
- Education: Springfield College

Sport
- Sport: Strongman
Medal record
Representing the United States
Arnold Strongman Classic
Gold medal – first place	2016 Columbus	Amateurs

Zach Hadge is an American strongman who won the 2016 Arnold Strongman Classic in the amateurs category. Next year he moved to the professional division and placed ninth.

Originally a football player, Hadge began competing as a strongman in 2010 while studying at Springfield College. In 2013 he won the national title in the 200 lb weight division. His brother Nick is also a strongman competitor.
