= Vasyl Virastyuk =

Ukrainian strongman (born 1974)

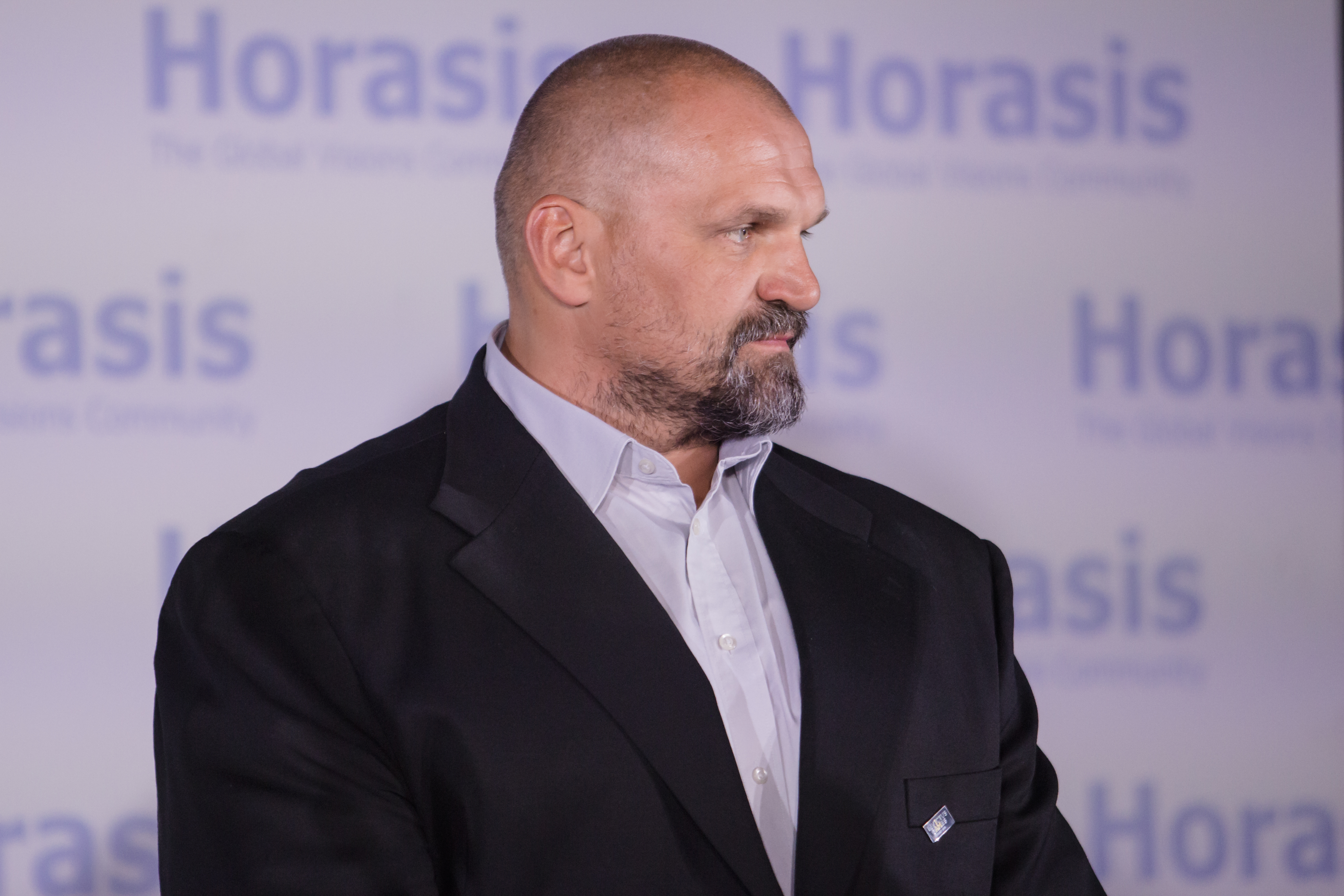
- Virastyuk in 2016

Personal information
- Born: Василь Вірастюк; 22 April 1974 (age 52) Ivano-Frankivsk, Ukraine
- Height: 1.91 m (6 ft 3 in)
- Weight: 145 kg (320 lb)

Sport
- Sport: Strongman competitions
Medal record
Representing Ukraine
World's Strongest Man
3rd	2003 World's Strongest Man
1st	2004 World's Strongest Man
World Muscle Power Championships
2nd	2004
Arnold Strongman Classic
2nd	2005 Arnold Strongman Classic
2nd	2006 Arnold Strongman Classic
2nd	2007 Arnold Strongman Classic
10th	2008 Arnold Strongman Classic
IFSA Strongman World Championships
2nd	2005
3rd	2006
1st	2007
Ukraine's Strongest Man
1st	1998 Ukraine's Strongest Man
1st	2001 Ukraine's Strongest Man
1st	2002 Ukraine's Strongest Man
1st	2003 Ukraine's Strongest Man
1st	2004 Ukraine's Strongest Man
1st	2006 Ukraine's Strongest Man
1st	2007 Ukraine's Strongest Man

Vasyl Yaroslavovych Virastyuk (Ukrainian: Василь Ярославович Вірастюк; born 22 April 1974) is a Ukrainian politician and former strongman competitor. He is a brother of Roman Virastyuk. Virastyuk was the winner of World's Strongest Man 2004. In a 28 March 2021 parliamentary by-election, Virastyuk was a candidate for Servant of the People. On 15 June 2021, he was sworn in as a member of the Ukrainian parliament.

== Sports career ==
Vasyl Virastyuk competed in the finals of the World's Strongest Man contest in 2003 and 2004. He finished third in 2003, behind then-defending champion Mariusz Pudzianowski and runner-up Žydrūnas Savickas. The following year, Virastyuk won the 2004 World's Strongest Man title, placing ahead of Savickas and Pudzianowski (Pudzianowski would later be disqualified for testing positive for a banned substance).

After this victory, there was a split in the world of Strongman competition. While some of the competitors such as Virastyuk and Žydrūnas Savickas started competing for the IFSA Strongman title (with Savickas winning the title in 2005 and 2006), others such as Pudzianowski remained and competed for the Met-Rx World's Strongest Man title (with Pudzianowski winning in 2005, 2007, and 2008).

After finishing second in 2005 and third in 2006, at the 2007 IFSA World Championship in Geumsan, South Korea, Virastyuk defeated two-time IFSA World Champion Savickas. With this victory, he became the first athlete in the history of strongman to win both a World's Strongest Man title and an IFSA World title. Savickas would be the second to accomplish this feat after winning the 2009 World's Strongest Man title in Malta.

Virastyuk has also achieved a podium finish on three occasions in three consecutive years (2005, 2006 and 2007) at the Arnold Strongman Classic coming second on each occasion to Žydrūnas Savickas. At the 2006 Arnold Strongman Classic, he and Mikhail Koklyaev power clean and pressed the 166 kg (366 lb) Apollon's Wheels for 5 reps (without involving a continental clean), and surpassed Mark Henry's 2002 performance of 3 power cleans and reps. The shared record was again equaled by Andrus Murumets in 2007 while Virastyuk performed a 6th power clean, but couldn't perform the final press to take the record outright.

At the 2008 Arnold Strongman Classic, Virastyuk was forced to withdraw due to a career ending injury which happened during the timber carry event.

=== Honours ===
- 3rd place World's Strongest Man (2003)
- 1st place World's Strongest Man (2004)
- 2nd place World Championship (IFSA) (2005)
- 3rd place World Championship (IFSA) (2006)
- 1st place World Championship (IFSA) (2007)

=== Personal records ===
- Super Yoke – 410 kg (904 lb) for 30 m (98 ft) in 11.34 secs (2007 IFSA Strongman World Championships) (joint-world record)
- Farmer's walk (no straps) – 150 kg (331 lb) per each hand for 30m course in 12.48 seconds (2004 Strongman Super Series Sweden Grand Prix) (World Record)
- Deadlift hold (with straps) – 375 kg (827 lb) for 87.83 seconds (2006 IFSA Strongman World Championships) (World Record)
- Keg Toss – 25 kg (55 lb) over 5.00 metres (16 ft 5 in) (2004 IFSA Grand Prix Cekol Cup)
- Train pull – 16,000 kg (35,274 lb) for 16 meter course in 25.44 seconds (2003 World's Strongest Man, group 4) (World Record)

== Political career ==
On 11 February 2021, Virastyuk was nominated to run in the 28 March 2021 parliamentary by-election for constituency 87, located in Ivano-Frankivsk Oblast, by Servant of the People.

On 22 April 2021, the Central Election Commission of Ukraine (CEC) officially declared Virastyuk the winner of the election with 31.25%. Runner up Oleksandr Shevchenko officially received 749 votes less (gaining 29.69% of vote). Shevchenko appealed this decision and on 2 May 2021, the Supreme Court of Ukraine revoked the April 22 CEC decision claiming the CEC had not ensured the verification of all violations committed during the election. On 19 May 2021, the CEC drew up a new protocol on the results of the election; this time, they declared the results of 6 polling stations invalid. According to this document, Virastyuk had gained 14,811 votes, Shevchenko 13,942 and Ruslan Koshulynskyi 13,463. On 23 May 2021, the Supreme Court annulled this protocol too after an appeal by Shevchenko. The Grand Chamber of the Supreme Court annulled this decision on 5 June 2021 and ten days later he took the oath of the People's Deputy of Ukraine.

== Filmography ==
- 2009 – How Cossacks... - The Blacksmith
- 2013 – Strong Ivan - Velet
- 2014 – Lonely under the Сontract - Edik
- 2016 – The Dragon Spell - Kyrylo Kozhumiaka
- 2018 – The Stolen Princess - Troyeschyna gangster
- 2018 – The Adventures of S Nicholas - Kaban
- 2019 – Edelweiss Hotel - Police captain
- 2019 – Polina and the Mystery of a Film Studio - The Viking

== See also ==
- Strongman Champions League
- IFSA
- Alexey Vishnitsky
- Ukrainian Federation of Strength Athletes

Preceded by Mariusz Pudzianowski	World's Strongest Man; 2004	Succeeded by Mariusz Pudzianowski
