= Alexey Vishnitsky =

Ukrainian weightlifter (born 1981)

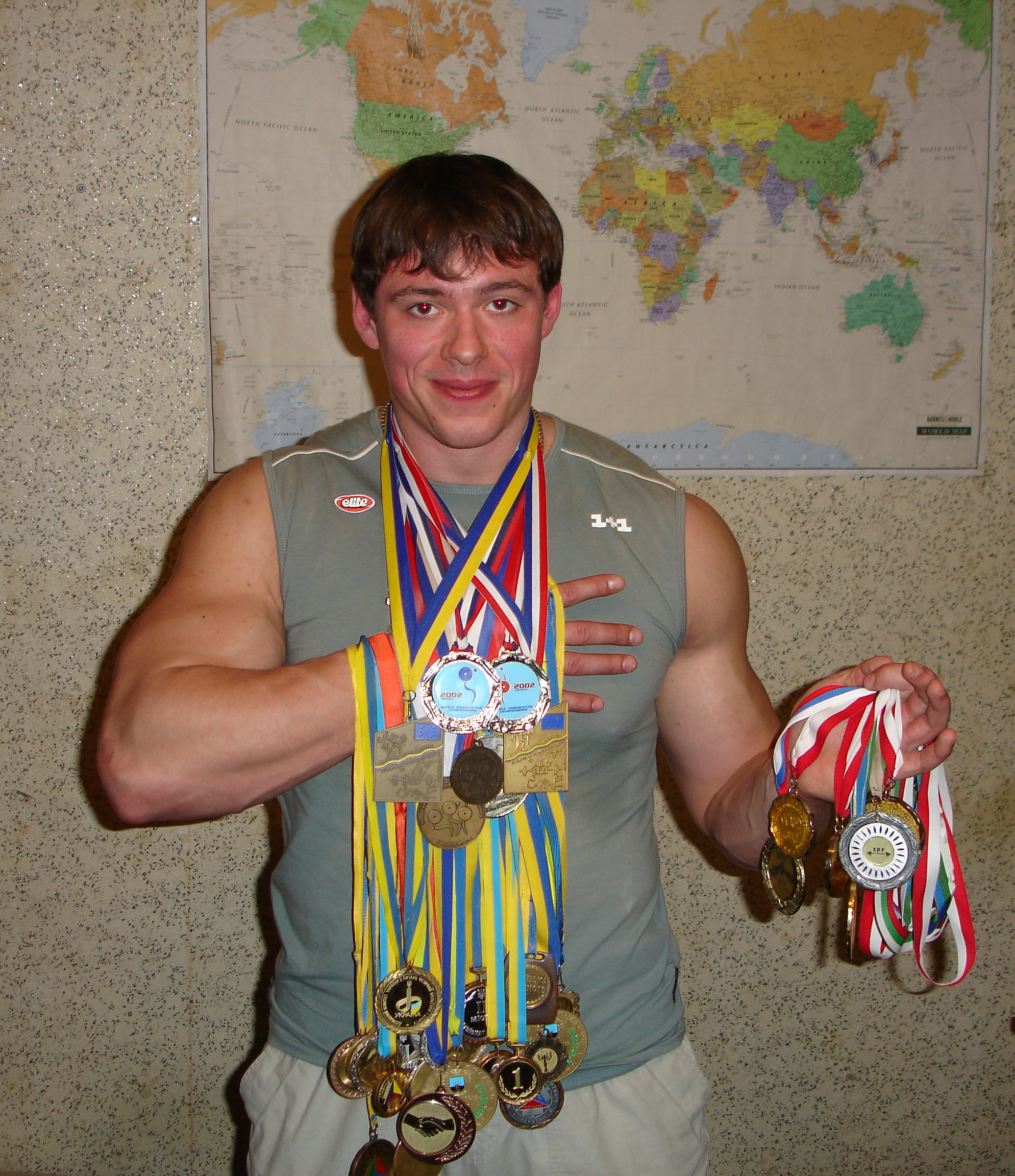
- Alexey Vishnitsky in 2005

Personal information
- Nationality: Ukraine
- Born: Alexey Vishnitsky; 1 May 1981 (age 45) Kharkiv, USSR (now Kharkiv, Ukraine)
- Occupation: Powerlifting Strongman U.F.S.A.

Competition record

Powerlifting, Strongman

Representing Ukraine

Ukrainian Powerlifting Championship
1st	2001 Ukrainian Powerlifting Championship
1st	2003 Ukrainian Powerlifting Championship

European Junior Powerlifting Championship
2nd	2000 European Junior Powerlifting Championship

European Powerlifting Championship
1st	2001 European Powerlifting Championship in Russia, Syktyvkar
3rd	2002 European Powerlifting Championship in Sweden

world powerlifting championship
1st	2001 World Powerlifting Championship in Finland
3rd	2002 World Powerlifting Championship in Slovakia
1st	2003 World Powerlifting Championship in Denmark

Alexey Vishnitsky (born 1981; Ukrainian: Олексій Іванович Вишницький, Russian: Алексей Иванович Вишницкий) is a Ukrainian powerlifter. He is a two time IPF world champion and an Honoured Master of Sports of Ukraine.

He was a member of the team of strongmen of Ukraine, and a multiple winner in the 105 kg class. He took part in the Ukrainian version of the Fort Boyard TV show in 2004 with Vasyl Virastyuk's team of strongmen.

== Biography ==
Alexey was born on 1 May 1981 in Kharkiv, Ukraine. His mother was a kindergarten teacher and his father was a welder. His older brother works in the Kharkiv Fire Lifeguard Department of the Ministry of Emergencies. He has two children, a daughter, Kseniya, and a son, Arsenij.

In 1998, Vishnitsky finished secondary school at Number 120 in Kharkiv. In 1998, he entered the Academy of Physical Culture and Sport in Kharkiv and graduated with a master's degree in 2004. He then entered Kharkiv State Veterinary Academy and graduated in 2009 with a speciality as a pharmacist of veterinary medicine.

As of 2015, he works as a gym instructor.

== Selected results ==
Full results can be found at openpowerlifting.org.

- 2001 – 1st place, 100kg class, 31st IPF World Men's Open Single Championships (Sotkamo, Finland)
- 2002 – 3rd place, 100kg class, 32nd IPF World Men's Open Single Championships (Trenčín, Slovakia)
- 2003 – 1st place, 100kg class, 33rd IPF World Men's Open Single Championships (Vejle, Denmark)

== Records ==
- 2001 – European record for deadlift: 375 kg
- 2003 – European record for squat: 387 kg, total: 982 kg.

== See also ==
- Strongman Champions League
- IFSA
- U.F.S.A.
- Serhiy Romanchuk
