= Oleksandr Pekanov =

Ukrainian strongman born in 1980

Personal information
- Born: Oleksandr Pekanov; 21 April 1980 (age 46) Chernihiv, Ukraine
- Height: 6 ft 3 in (191 cm)
- Weight: 185 kg (408 lb)

Sport
- Sport: Strongman competitions
Medal record
Representing Ukraine
Arnold Strongman Classic
5th	2007 Arnold Strongman Classic
8th	2008 Arnold Strongman Classic
9th	2009 Arnold Strongman Classic
Pojedynek Gigantów
3rd	2005 Pojedynek Gigantów
IFSA Grand Prix
11th	2005 IFSA European Championships
3rd	2006 IFSA Ukraine Championships
10th	2007 IFSA European Championships
Strongman Champions League
7th	2008 Latvia
United Strongman Series
4th	2005 USS Kyiv
1st	2005 USS Serbia
3rd	2005 USS Moscow
2nd	2005 USS Canada
Europe's Strongest Man
6th	2005 Europe's Strongest Man
Ukraine's Strongest Man
3rd	2005 Ukraine's Strongest Man
6th	2007 Ukraine's Strongest Man
11th	2009 Ukraine's Strongest Man
3rd	2011 Ukraine's Strongest Man

Oleksandr Pekanov (Ukrainian: Олександр Пеканов; born 21 April 1980), is a Ukrainian strongman. He is a former joint-strongman standard deadlift and hummer tyre deadlift world record holder.

== Early life ==
Oleksandr was born 21 April 1980 in Chernihiv, Ukraine. In 2001, he graduated from Chernihiv State Institute of Economics and Management. After graduating from the institute, became a soldier (in the railway troops). From 2002 to 2004 he worked at Ukrainian customs department.

== Career ==
Standing 6 ft 3 in (191 cm) and weighing in at a staggering 185 kg (408 lb), Oleksandr decided to do competitive strongman. In his very first competition 2005 Pojedynek Gigantów, he went head to head against Mariusz Pudzianowski in a deadlift battle and pulled 410 kg (904 lb) and equaled the long-standing strongman deadlift world record of Gerrit Badenhorst.

Then he participated at United Strongman Series world championships and won 2005 USS Serbia and emerged third at 2005 USS Moscow. Among the next competitions he did are Arnold Strongman Classic, Strongman Champions League, Europe's Strongest Man and IFSA Grand Prix.

At 2008 Arnold Strongman Classic, Oleksandr and Benedikt Magnússon broke and shared the hummer tyre deadlift world record at 471 kg (1,038 lb).

== Personal records ==
- Deadlift (Raw with straps) – 410 kg (904 lb) (2005 Pojedynek Gigantów) (former joint-world record)
- Hummer Tire Deadlift – 471 kg (1,038 lb) (2008 Arnold Strongman Classic) (former joint-world record)
- Squat – 420 kg (926 lb)
- Bench press – 260 kg (573 lb)
- Manhood Stone (Max Atlas Stone) for reps – 238 kg (525 lb) x 2 reps over 4 ft bar (2008 Arnold Strongman Classic) and 220 kg (485 lb) x 3 reps over 4 ft bar (2007 Arnold Strongman Classic)
- Atlas stones – 5 stones weighing 120–175 kg (265–386 lb) on tall platforms in 35.15 seconds (2005 United Strongman Series Serbia) (World Record)

In training:

- Deadlift (Raw with straps) – 455 kg (1,003 lb)
