= Arnold Strongman Classic =

International strongman competition

- The official logo of the Arnold Sports Festival

Tournament information
- Location: Columbus, Ohio
- Month played: March
- Established: 2002; 24 years ago
- Format: Multi-event competition
- Venue: Greater Columbus Convention Center

Current champion
- (Canada) Mitchell Hooper

Most recent tournament
- 2026 Arnold Strongman Classic

The Arnold Strongman Classic is an annual strongman competition featuring strength athletes from all over the world, determining who is the Strongest Man in the world. Jointly created by Arnold Schwarzenegger, Jim Lorimer and Terry Todd in 2002, it is a prominent offshoot of the Arnold Sports Festival which takes place annually in Columbus, Ohio, USA.

Widely regarded as the heaviest and the most difficult strongman competition in the world the Arnold Strongman Classic has been won by only 9 men in history. Among them, the Lithuanian Žydrūnas Savickas has won it 8 times, while the Canadian Mitchell Hooper has won it 4 times. The American Brian Shaw, and Icelander Hafþór Júlíus Björnsson have won it 3 times each. Three of the past champions: American Mark Henry, Hafþór Júlíus Björnsson and Brian Shaw have been inducted into the International Sports Hall of Fame.

== History ==
The competition (which has been also referred to as 'Arnold's Strength Summit' and 'Arnold's Strongest Man' in the past) is one of the many offshoots of the Arnold festival. The Arnold Sports Festival, founded in 1989 as the Arnold Classic and named after Arnold Schwarzenegger, was originally a bodybuilding contest only. However, the event expanded to include other sports and events, one of which was Strongman, introduced in 2002.

It was specifically designed by Terry Todd at the request of Schwarzenegger to select the actual strongest strongman based on straightforward tests of brute strength. The inaugural head judge was David P. Webster.

=== Championship history ===
==== 2002 ====
The inaugural competition, which was called the 'Arnold Strongman Challenge', was won by Mark Henry of the USA over Svend Karlsen of Norway and Phil Pfister of the USA. Henry won the Apollon's wheels, Andy Bolton won the deadlift, Raimonds Bergmanis won the Hummer push while Pfister won the timber carry. Competitors were also given the opportunity to attempt the Thomas Inch dumbbell outside of the competition and Henry took the win by lifting it up to chest height.

==== 2003 ====
2003 was the beginning of Lithuania's Žydrūnas Savickas's dominant reign of the competition. Karlsen emerged second, while Bergmanis secured third. Savickas won Apollon's wheels and timber carry while Karlsen won medicine ball toss. The Hummer tire deadlift was introduced and was won by Brad Gillingham. The competition was called 'Arnold's Strength Summit'.

==== 2004 ====
Savickas won his second title over Karlsen and Bergmanis. The competition was called 'Arnold's Strongest Man' and 5 events were tested. It was also the first year a 10 man lineup was selected over the initial 8 man lineup from the previous two years. Savickas secured the wins in Apollon's wheels, medicine ball toss and timber carry. Karlsen won the hammer lift while Mark Philippi won the Hummer tire deadlift.

==== 2005 ====
For the second year, the competition was called 'Arnold's Strongest Man' and Savickas secured his third title over Vasyl Virastyuk of Ukraine and Glenn Ross of Northern Ireland. 6 events were tested for the first time where Savickas won the Apollon's wheels and shared the medicine ball toss world record with Magnus Samuelsson. Ross won the Hummer tire deadlift, and shared the dumbbell press win with Brian Siders and Hugo Girard. Van Hatfield won the hammer lift while Philippi won the timber carry.

==== 2006 ====
In 2006, the competition took its default name 'Arnold Strongman Classic' and it was won by Savickas for the fourth time over Virastyuk and Mikhail Koklyaev of Russia. Savickas raised the Apollon's wheels world record to 8 reps, won the super yoke, and shared the dumbbell win with Koklyaev and Pfister. Siders won the Hummer tire deadlift while Benedikt Magnússon won the timber carry.

==== 2007 ====
Savickas won his fifth title over Virastyuk and Andrus Murumets of Estonia. He equaled his Apollon's wheels world record from last year and also won the Hummer tire deadlift and super yoke. The Manhood Stone was introduced for the first time and it was won by Steve MacDonald. Virastyuk won the dumbbell press and Murumets broke the timber carry world record.

==== 2008 ====
Savickas won his sixth consecutive title while winning Manhood Stone and sharing the dumbbell press win with American Derek Poundstone who won the overall second place. Siders won Apollon's wheels and super yoke while Murumets won the timber carry. Magnússon and Oleksandr Pekanov both broke and briefly shared the Hummer tire deadlift world record before Magnússon was given an extra attempt outside the competition to take the world record outright. Koklyaev's consistency awarded him the third place.

==== 2009 ====
In 2009, Savickas took a break and Derek Poundstone became the third man to win the title. He also broke the dumbbell press world record. Koklyaev won the Hummer tire deadlift and took the overall second place. Travis Ortmayer of USA won Manhood stone and took overall third. Ervin Katona won the timber carry, Vidas Blekaitis won the super yoke and Siders equaled Savickas' Apollon's wheels world record.

==== 2010 ====
Poundstone, having broken another dumbbell press world record and won the timber carry to win his second consecutive title over returned Savickas and Ortmayer. Savickas won the Hummer tire deadlift and established a new world record in the Axle. Brian Shaw of USA won the Manhood Stone after a close battle with Poundstone and Ortmayer. The number of events was reduced to 5.

==== 2011 ====
Just days before the 2011 contest, Poundstone was forced to withdraw due to injury and Brian Shaw became the fourth man to win the title. He broke the Manhood stones world record, shared the Hummer tire deadlift win with Savickas and won the timber carry. Mike Jenkins of USA won dumbbell press and secured second place. Savickas broke another Axle world record and secured third.

==== 2012 ====
Mike Jenkins held off Poundstone to become the fifth man to win the title. He broke dumbbell press world record and won both timber carry and the newly introduced Austrian Oak. Poundstone's consistency won him second place and Savickas secured third place after winning the Hummer tire deadlift and Axle (cleans only).

==== 2013 ====
The number of events were reduced to 4, and Lithuania's Vytautas Lalas became the sixth man to win the title. He also won the dumbbell press. Krzysztof Radzikowski won the Austrian Oak. Overall runner-up Shaw broke another Manhood stones world record and shared the Hummer tire deadlift world record with Mark Felix. Another consistent performance earned Koklyaev the overall third.

==== 2014 ====
The 5 event format was brought back and Savickas won his seventh title. He won the Austrian Oak and established world records in the Hummer tire deadlift and the newly introduced bale tote. Shaw came second with a consistent performance across the board and Mike Burke emerged third. Jerry Pritchett won the timber carry and there was a four-way tie for the win of the newly introduced Cyr dumbbell press between Savickas, Shaw, Burke and Hafþór Júlíus Björnsson.

==== 2015 ====
Shaw won his second title winning the Hummer tire deadlift and a world record in the bale tote. He also shared the world record in the Cyr dumbbell for reps with Dimitar Savatinov. Runner up Savickas broke the Austrian Oak world record. Hafþór Júlíus Björnsson broke the timber carry world record and as a part of Rogue record breakers, broke the Weight over bar world record. Mateusz Kieliszkowski of Poland secured the overall third place.

==== 2016 ====
Žydrūnas Savickas won his eighth and final title after equaling his own Austrian Oak world record. He also won the timber carry. Runner up Shaw broke world records in the Cyr dumbbell and bale tote. Eddie Hall won the newly introduced Elephant bar deadlift while Lalas secured the overall third place. As a part of Rogue record breakers, Shaw, Hafþór Júlíus Björnsson and Burke set world records in Max Manhood Stone, Weight over bar, and double Thomas Inch dumbbells farmers walk, respectively.

==== 2017 ====
Brian Shaw won his third and final title with a world record in bale tote. He also won the timber carry and as a part of Rogue record breakers, broke the Max Manhood Stone world record. The overall runner-up Hafþór Júlíus Björnsson won the Austrian Oak and broke the world record in the Sandbag over bar and as a part of Rogue record breakers, broke the Weight over bar world record. Jerry Pritchett broke the Elephant bar deadlift world record and secured overall third place.

==== 2018 ====
2018 marked the beginning of Iceland's Hafþór Júlíus Björnsson's winning reign, after becoming the seventh man to win the title. He broke the Elephant bar deadlift world record, and won both the Axle press and Sandbag over bar. As a part of Rogue record breakers, he also broke the Weight over bar world record. Shaw won second place with a consistent performance across the board. Kieliszkowski broke Odd Haugen's Tombstone world record and Mikhail Shivlyakov secured the overall third place.

==== 2019 ====
Hafþór Júlíus Björnsson won his second consecutive title and in doing so broke his own Elephant bar deadlift world record, world record replica Húsafell Stone carry and as a part of Rogue record breakers, broke Weight over bar world record as well. He also shared the win in Austrian Oak with Kieliszkowski, Shivlyakov and Martins Licis. Licis broke the world record in the Conan's wheel of pain and secured the second place while Kieliszkowski broke the Odd Haugen's Tombstone world record and secured the third place.

==== 2020 ====
Hafþór Júlíus Björnsson won his third consecutive title becoming only the second man since Savickas to do so. He won the Elephant bar deadlift and the Sandbag over bar and held off Kieliszkowski who won trial by Stone, wheel of pain and established world records in Max Cyr Dumbbell and timber carry to second place. With another consistent performance, Licis secured the third place. As a part of Rogue record breakers, Tom Stoltman broke the Max Manhood Stone world record.

==== 2021 ====
The competition was not held for the first and only time in its history due to the COVID-19 pandemic.

==== 2022 ====
America's Martins Licis became the eighth man to win the title. He won the Odd Haugen's Tombstone and stayed consistent across the board. Ukraine's Oleksii Novikov came second place and broke the dumbbell press world record. JF Caron established a new world record in the Double-T Squat while Luke Stoltman and Bobby Thompson shared the third place.

==== 2023 ====
Canada's Mitchell Hooper became the ninth man to win the title, and the first man to win without winning a single event. Runner-up Kieliszkowski won wheel of pain, timber carry and established a new world record in Steinstossen. Thompson emerged third with a win in briefed deadlift and Trey Mitchell won the Austrian Oak.

==== 2024 ====
Hooper won his second title with wins in timber carry, Axle and a world record replica Dinnie Stones carry. Hafþór Júlíus Björnsson returned after a three-year hiatus and won the Elephant bar deadlift event. Kieliszkowski won the Stones of Strength and secured second place, while Tom Stoltman emerged third.

==== 2025 ====
Hooper won his third consecutive title becoming only the third man since Björnsson to do so. He won the Timber Carry. American Lucas Hatton won the Overhead Medley and Behind the Neck Press and secured second place on his debut at the competition. Björnsson emerged third and won the Elephant bar Deadlift and Carry and Drag. Austin Andrade won the Stone to Shoulder.

==== 2026 ====
Hooper won his fourth consecutive title becoming only the second man since Savickas to do so. He won the Deadlift and Dumbell. Andrade emerged second and won the Tombstone. Martins Licis won the Carry and Drag and secured third place on his return to the competition. Mitchell won the Log Press and Nick Guardione won the Loading Race.

== Championship breakdown ==
=== Podiums ===
Year	Champion	Runner-up	3rd Place
2002	(United States) Mark Henry	(Norway) Svend Karlsen	(United States) Phil Pfister
2003	(Lithuania) Žydrūnas Savickas	(Norway) Svend Karlsen	(Latvia) Raimonds Bergmanis
2004	(Lithuania) Žydrūnas Savickas (2)	(Norway) Svend Karlsen	(Latvia) Raimonds Bergmanis
2005	(Lithuania) Žydrūnas Savickas (3)	(Ukraine) Vasyl Virastyuk	(United Kingdom) Glenn Ross
2006	(Lithuania) Žydrūnas Savickas (4)	(Ukraine) Vasyl Virastyuk	(Russia) Mikhail Koklyaev
2007	(Lithuania) Žydrūnas Savickas (5)	(Ukraine) Vasyl Virastyuk	(Estonia) Andrus Murumets
2008	(Lithuania) Žydrūnas Savickas (6)	(United States) Derek Poundstone	(Russia) Mikhail Koklyaev
2009	(United States) Derek Poundstone	(Russia) Mikhail Koklyaev	(United States) Travis Ortmayer
2010	(United States) Derek Poundstone (2)	(Lithuania) Žydrūnas Savickas	(United States) Travis Ortmayer
2011	(United States) Brian Shaw	(United States) Mike Jenkins	(Lithuania) Žydrūnas Savickas
2012	(United States) Mike Jenkins	(United States) Derek Poundstone	(Lithuania) Žydrūnas Savickas
2013	(Lithuania) Vytautas Lalas	(United States) Brian Shaw	(Russia) Mikhail Koklyaev
2014	(Lithuania) Žydrūnas Savickas (7)	(United States) Brian Shaw	(United States) Mike Burke
2015	(United States) Brian Shaw (2)	(Lithuania) Žydrūnas Savickas	(Poland) Mateusz Kieliszkowski
2016	(Lithuania) Žydrūnas Savickas (8)	(United States) Brian Shaw	(Lithuania) Vytautas Lalas
2017	(United States) Brian Shaw (3)	(Iceland) Hafþór Júlíus Björnsson	(United States) Jerry Pritchett
2018	(Iceland) Hafþór Júlíus Björnsson	(United States) Brian Shaw	(Russia) Mikhail Shivlyakov
2019	(Iceland) Hafþór Júlíus Björnsson (2)	(United States) Martins Licis	(Poland) Mateusz Kieliszkowski
2020	(Iceland) Hafþór Júlíus Björnsson (3)	(Poland) Mateusz Kieliszkowski	(United States) Martins Licis
2021	The competition was not held due to the COVID-19 pandemic.		
2022	(United States) Martins Licis	(Ukraine) Oleksii Novikov	(United Kingdom) Luke Stoltman & (United States) Bobby Thompson
2023	(Canada) Mitchell Hooper	(Poland) Mateusz Kieliszkowski	(United States) Bobby Thompson
2024	(Canada) Mitchell Hooper (2)	(Poland) Mateusz Kieliszkowski	(United Kingdom) Tom Stoltman
2025	(Canada) Mitchell Hooper (3)	(United States) Lucas Hatton	(Iceland) Hafþór Júlíus Björnsson
2026	(Canada) Mitchell Hooper (4)	(United States) Austin Andrade	(United States) Martins Licis

=== Multiple time champions ===
No.	Champion	Times	Years
1	(Lithuania) Žydrūnas Savickas	8	2003, 2004, 2005, 2006, 2007, 2008, 2014, 2016
2	(Canada) Mitchell Hooper	4	2023, 2024, 2025, 2026
3	(United States) Brian Shaw	3	2011, 2015, 2017
3	(Iceland) Hafþór Júlíus Björnsson	3	2018, 2019, 2020
5	(United States) Derek Poundstone	2	2009, 2010

=== Most podium finishes ===
No.	Name	Times
1	(Lithuania) Žydrūnas Savickas	12
2	(United States) Brian Shaw	7
3	(Iceland) Hafþór Júlíus Björnsson	5
3	(Poland) Mateusz Kieliszkowski	5
5	(Canada) Mitchell Hooper	4
5	(United States) Derek Poundstone	4
5	(United States) Martins Licis	4
8	(Norway) Svend Karlsen	3
8	(Ukraine) Vasyl Virastyuk	3
8	(Russia) Mikhail Koklyaev	3

=== Championships by country ===
Country	Gold	Silver	Bronze	Total
Lithuania	9	2	3	14
United States	8	11	8	27
Canada	4	0	0	4
Iceland	3	1	1	5
Ukraine	0	4	0	4
Poland	0	3	2	5
Norway	0	3	0	3
Russia	0	1	4	5
United Kingdom	0	0	3	3
Latvia	0	0	2	2
Estonia	0	0	1	1

== Regular events and world records ==
The events also include Rogue record breakers which were conducted in parallel to the Arnold Strongman Classic.

1. Timber carry - Contestants have to lift heavy barn timbers bolted together and travel up an inclined ramp. In 2015 Hafþór Júlíus Björnsson (Iceland) carried a 500 kg (1,102 lb) frame (with straps) up a 35 feet ramp in 10.15 seconds, and in 2020 Mateusz Kieliszkowski (Poland) carried a 400 kg (882 lb) frame (without straps) up a 35 feet ramp in 7.01 seconds. The event is also known as 'Frame Carry'.
2. Manhood Stones - Contestants have to lift heavy round concrete stones weighing in excess of 227 kg (500 lb) (hence Manhood Stones) over a bar 4 feet in height. In 2020 Tom Stoltman (Scotland) hoisted a 273 kg (602 lb) stone over the bar.
3. Apollon's wheels - A unique barbell made famous by Louis "Apollon" Uni, reproduced by Ivanko Barbell Company, the Axle is a replica of the original with the same bar thickness of 1 11/12" (1.93" or 49.3mm) and mechanically fastened to railway car wheels and fixed. Therefore the bar and the wheels are not moving, making the lift even more difficult. Contestants must lift the wheels from the floor to overhead as many times as possible within a time frame. In 2006 Žydrūnas Savickas (Lithuania) and in 2009 Brian Siders (United States) continental clean (Note: 'Power clean' involves pulling the bar all the way to the top of the upper chest at one go. In addition to grip strength, it also requires tremendous wrist strength to rotate the fixed implement as you clean it. The 'Continental clean' on the other hand allows the individual to rest the bar on the stomach which gives an opportunity to re-grip before finishing the clean.) and repped a 166 kg (366 lb) Axle for 8 reps. In 2009 Mikhail Koklyaev (Russia) did power cleans and repped it for 7 reps. In 2010, Žydrūnas Savickas (Lithuania) pressed a 208 kg (459 lb) Axle for 2 strict reps and a year later, performed 5 reps with a 188 kg (415 lb) Axle.
4. Austrian Oak - A unique log named after Arnold Schwarzenegger's nickname which weighs anywhere from 195–204 kg (430-450 lb) where the athletes have to press for the maximum number of reps. A lighter Slater log which weighs 175 kg (386 lb) was also used for athletes who couldn't lift the Austrian Oak. In 2015 and 2016 Žydrūnas Savickas (Lithuania) repped a 204 kg (450 lb) Austrian Oak 4 times, and in 2026, Trey Mitchell (United States) repped a 195 kg (430 lb) Austrian Oak 5 times.
5. Hummer tire Deadlift - Contestants are required to lift a specially designed 13 ft (3.96 m) long bar loaded with Hummer tires from 15" height. The bar was designed and manufactured by Ivanko Barbell Company and could hold up to eight Hummer tires with the rims intact. Additional calibrated barbell plates may be added if required. In 2014 Žydrūnas Savickas (Lithuania) pulled 524 kg (1,155 lb) from a 15" height.
6. Elephant bar Deadlift - Contestants are required to lift a specially designed extra whipping 10 ft (3.05 m) long bar called an Elephant bar with Arnold Schwarzenegger inscribed 2-inch thick deep dish stainless steel weight plates from a standard 9" height. It has to be done raw and use of figure 8 straps are not allowed. It was designed and manufactured by Rogue Fitness. In 2019 Hafþór Júlíus Björnsson (Iceland) pulled 474.5 kg (1,046 lb) from the standard 9" height.
7. Bale Tote - Contestants have to carry across their shoulders a heavy bar/yoke in a timed event. In 2017 Brian Shaw (United States) carried a 710 kg (1,565 lb) yoke for 4 meters in 14.87 seconds. The event is also known as 'Super Yoke'.
8. Bag over bar - Contestants have to throw heavy sandbags over a 15-foot bar. In 2017 Hafþór Júlíus Björnsson (Iceland) threw a 45 kg (100 lb) bag over the 15-foot bar.
9. Weight over bar - Contestants have to throw a 25.5 kg (56 lb) weight derived from the Highland games, using only 1 arm, for max height over a bar. In 2019 Hafþór Júlíus Björnsson (Iceland) threw the weight over a 20-foot 2-inch bar.
10. Cyr Dumbbell - Lifting the classic heavy "Circus" dumbbell, used by Louis Cyr. Richard Sorin recreated the dumbbell for this event. It usually has a big handle of over 3 inches (76 mm) in diameter and sits lower than a normal circus dumbbell once it's shouldered before the final press, increasing its range of motion. The basic rule was to use one hand and lift the dumbbell overhead either for max weight or reps. In 2020 Mateusz Kieliszkowski (Poland) lifted a 145 kg (320 lb) dumbbell, and in 2016 Brian Shaw (United States) repped a 136 kg (300 lb) dumbbell 3 times.
11. Odd Haugen's Tombstone - Contestants have to lift a natural stone that weighs 186 kg (410 lb) to their shoulder for many reps as possible. In 2019 Mateusz Kieliszkowski (Poland) lifted the stone for 5 repetitions.
12. Húsafell Stone - Contestants have to carry the legendary Húsafell Stone which weighs 186 kg (410 lb) around a structure that replicated the historical sheep and goat pen. In 2019 Hafþór Júlíus Björnsson (Iceland) carried the stone for a distance of 218 feet 11 inches.
13. Conan's Wheel of Pain - Hailing from the Basque circle tradition, the event replicated the legendary grain mill from Conan the Barbarian (1982) where the contestants have to push a contraption which weighs 20,000 lbs around in a circle for time or distance and measured in either degrees or distance. The colossal contraption was replicated and built by Rogue Fitness. In 2019 Martins Licis (United States) pushed the wheel for a distance of 119 feet 9 inches.
14. Steinborn Squat - A unique barbell with globes and a squat made famous by Henry 'Milo' Steinborn, where contestants have to erect and tip the barbell to their backs unassisted and squat it. In 2019 Martins Licis (United States) squatted 256.5 kg (565 lb) with the implement.
15. Double T Squat - Contestants have to Squat a specially designed cambered duffalo bar to a depth-adjusted platform, for max weight. In 2022 Jean-François Caron (Canada) Squatted 438 kg (966 lb). The event was named after Terry Todd.
16. Steinstossen Stone toss - Contestants have to throw an oval shaped natural stone for distance. In 2023 Mateusz Kieliszkowski (Poland) threw an 84 kg (185 lb) stone for a distance of 11 feet 5 inches.

== Full results ==
=== 2002: Arnold Classic Strongman Competition ===
Dates: 22, 23 February 2002

Columbus, Ohio:

#	Athlete	Nation	Points	Prize
1st place, gold medalist(s)	Mark Henry	United States	25	Hummer + $10,000
2nd place, silver medalist(s)	Svend Karlsen	Norway	22.5	$15,000
3rd place, bronze medalist(s)	Phil Pfister	United States	21.5	$10,000
4	Mark Philippi	United States	20	$5000
5	Andy Bolton	United Kingdom	16	$3500
5	Raimonds Bergmanis	Latvia	16	$3500
7	Brad Gillingham	United States	13	$2000
8	Brian Schoonveld	United States	10	$1000

=== 2003: Arnold's Strength Summit ===
Dates: 28 February, 1 March 2003

Columbus, Ohio:

#	Athlete	Nation	Points	Prize
1st place, gold medalist(s)	Žydrūnas Savickas	Lithuania	28.5	Hummer + $15 000
2nd place, silver medalist(s)	Svend Karlsen	Norway	26.5	$15,000
3rd place, bronze medalist(s)	Raimonds Bergmanis	Latvia	17.5	$10,000
4	Mariusz Pudzianowski	Poland	15.5	$5000
5	Steve Kirit	United States	14.5	$4000
6	Phil Pfister	United States	14	$2500
6	Zdeněk Sedmík	Czech Republic	14	$2500
8	Brad Gillingham	United States	13.5	$1000

=== 2004: Arnold's Strongest Man ===
Dates: 5, 6 March 2004

Columbus, Ohio:

#	Athlete	Nation	Points	Prize
1st place, gold medalist(s)	Žydrūnas Savickas	Lithuania	43	Hummer + $16 000
2nd place, silver medalist(s)	Svend Karlsen	Norway	39.5	$15 000
3rd place, bronze medalist(s)	Raimonds Bergmanis	Latvia	33.5	$12 000
4	Mark Philippi	United States	33	$6000
5	Mariusz Pudzianowski	Poland	30	$5000
6	Vasyl Virastyuk	Ukraine	27	$4000
7	Brian Schoonveld	United States	21	$3000
8	Anders Johansson	Sweden	20.5	$2000
9	Steve Kirit	United States	14.5	$1500
10	István Árvai	Hungary	13.5	$1000

=== 2005: Arnold's Strongest Man ===
Dates: 4, 5 March 2005

Columbus, Ohio:

#	Athlete	Nation	Points	Prize
1st place, gold medalist(s)	Žydrūnas Savickas	Lithuania	46	Hummer + $16,000
2nd place, silver medalist(s)	Vasyl Virastyuk	Ukraine	41	$15,000
3rd place, bronze medalist(s)	Glenn Ross	United Kingdom	39.5	$12,000
4	Mark Philippi	United States	35	$6000
5	Brian Siders	United States	34.5	$5000
6	Svend Karlsen	Norway	33.5	$4000
7	Van Hatfield	United States	32	$3000
8	Karl Gillingham	United States	28	$2000
9	Hugo Girard	Canada	23	$1500
10	Magnus Samuelsson	Sweden	14.5	$1000

=== 2006: Arnold Strongman Classic ===
Dates: 3, 4 March 2006

Columbus, Ohio:

#	Athlete	Nation	Points	Prize
1st place, gold medalist(s)	Žydrūnas Savickas	Lithuania	53.5	Hummer
2nd place, silver medalist(s)	Vasyl Virastyuk	Ukraine	45	?
3rd place, bronze medalist(s)	Mikhail Koklyaev	Russia	38.5	?
4	Phil Pfister	United States	37.5	?
5	Benedikt Magnússon	Iceland	35.5	?
6	Mariusz Pudzianowski	Poland	35	?
7	Brian Siders	United States	32.5	?
8	Raimonds Bergmanis	Latvia	23.5	?
9	Dominic Filiou	Canada	15.5	?
10	Glenn Ross	United Kingdom	13.5	?

=== 2007: Arnold Strongman Classic ===
Dates: 2–4 March 2007

Columbus, Ohio:

#	Athlete	Nation	Points	Prize
1st place, gold medalist(s)	Žydrūnas Savickas	Lithuania	52	Hummer
2nd place, silver medalist(s)	Vasyl Virastyuk	Ukraine	48	?
3rd place, bronze medalist(s)	Andrus Murumets	Estonia	38.5	?
4	Phil Pfister	United States	36	?
5	Mikhail Koklyaev	Russia	33	?
5	Oleksandr Pekanov	Ukraine	33	?
7	Brian Siders	United States	28.5	?
8	Steve MacDonald	United States	23	?
9	Karl Gillingham	United States	19	?
10	Travis Ortmayer	United States	17	?

=== 2008: Arnold Strongman Classic ===
Dates: 29 February, 1 March 2008

Columbus, Ohio:

#	Athlete	Nation	Points	Prize
1st place, gold medalist(s)	Žydrūnas Savickas	Lithuania	50.5	$40,000
2nd place, silver medalist(s)	Derek Poundstone	United States	41.5	$20,000
3rd place, bronze medalist(s)	Mikhail Koklyaev	Russia	37	$15,000
4	Andrus Murumets	Estonia	36.5	$10,000
5	Benedikt Magnússon	Iceland	34	$7000
5	Brian Siders	United States	34	$7000
7	Phil Pfister	United States	32	$5000
8	Oleksandr Pekanov	Ukraine	28	$3000
9	Van Hatfield	United States	24	$2000
10	Vasyl Virastyuk	Ukraine	8.5	$1000

=== 2009: Arnold Strongman Classic ===
Dates: 6, 7 March 2009

Columbus, Ohio:

#	Athlete	Nation	Points	Prize
1st place, gold medalist(s)	Derek Poundstone	United States	47	$40,000
2nd place, silver medalist(s)	Mikhail Koklyaev	Russia	46	$20,000
3rd place, bronze medalist(s)	Travis Ortmayer	United States	39.5	$15,000
4	Vidas Blekaitis	Lithuania	38	$10,000
5	Phil Pfister	United States	36.5	$8000
6	Brian Siders	United States	34	$6000
7	Andrus Murumets	Estonia	32	$5000
8	Ervin Katona	Serbia	29	$3000
9	Oleksandr Pekanov	Ukraine	17	$2000
10	Dave Ostlund	United States	10	$1000

=== 2010: Arnold Strongman Classic ===
Dates: 5, 6 March 2010

Columbus, Ohio (Greater Columbus Convention Center, Arnold EXPO Stage)

#	Athlete	Nation	Points	Prize
1st place, gold medalist(s)	Derek Poundstone	United States	45	$45,000
2nd place, silver medalist(s)	Žydrūnas Savickas	Lithuania	41	$20,000
3rd place, bronze medalist(s)	Travis Ortmayer	United States	37.5	$15,000
4	Mikhail Koklyaev	Russia	37	$10,000
5	Brian Shaw	United States	33	$8000
6	Dave Ostlund	United States	22.5	$6000
7	Phil Pfister	United States	20.5	$5000
8	Konstiantyn Ilin	Ukraine	17	$3000
9	Nick Best	United States	13	$2000
10	Brian Siders	United States	8.5	$1000

=== 2011: Arnold Strongman Classic ===
Dates: 4, 5 March 2011

Columbus, Ohio (Greater Columbus Convention Center, Arnold EXPO Stage)

#	Athlete	Nation	Points	Prize
1st place, gold medalist(s)	Brian Shaw	United States	46.5	$50,000
2nd place, silver medalist(s)	Mike Jenkins	United States	39.5	$20,000
3rd place, bronze medalist(s)	Žydrūnas Savickas	Lithuania	37.5	$15,000
4	Travis Ortmayer	United States	36	$10,000
5	Mikhail Koklyaev	Russia	30	$8000
6	Mark Felix	United Kingdom	24.5	$6000
7	Nick Best	United States	20	$5000
8	Terry Hollands	United Kingdom	18	$3000
9	Serhiy Romanchuk	Ukraine	17	$2000

=== 2012: Arnold Strongman Classic ===
Dates: 2, 3 March 2012

Columbus, Ohio (Greater Columbus Convention Center, Arnold EXPO Stage)

#	Athlete	Nation	Points	Prize
1st place, gold medalist(s)	Mike Jenkins	United States	40	$50,000
2nd place, silver medalist(s)	Derek Poundstone	United States	39	$20,000
3rd place, bronze medalist(s)	Žydrūnas Savickas	Lithuania	36.5	$15,000
4	Brian Shaw	United States	36	$10,000
5	Mike Burke	United States	27.5	$8000
6	Mikhail Koklyaev	Russia	26	$6000
7	Laurence Shahlaei	United Kingdom	22.5	$5000
8	Terry Hollands	United Kingdom	19	$3000
9	Travis Ortmayer	United States	15	$2000
10	Hafþór Júlíus Björnsson	Iceland	13.5	$1000

=== 2013: Arnold Strongman Classic ===
Dates: 1, 2 March 2013

Columbus, Ohio (Greater Columbus Convention Center, Arnold EXPO Stage)

#	Athlete	Nation	Points	Prize
1st place, gold medalist(s)	Vytautas Lalas	Lithuania	35	$60,000
2nd place, silver medalist(s)	Brian Shaw	United States	34.5	$20,000
3rd place, bronze medalist(s)	Mikhail Koklyaev	Russia	30	$15,000
4	Krzysztof Radzikowski	Poland	26	$10,000
5	Mike Burke	United States	21.5	$8,000
6	Mark Felix	United Kingdom	20.5	$6,000
7	Jerry Pritchett	United States	18.5	$5,000
8	Hafþór Júlíus Björnsson	Iceland	17	$3,000
9	Derek Poundstone	United States	11	$2,000
10	Adam Scherr	United States	1	$1,000

=== 2014: Arnold Strongman Classic ===
Dates: 1, 2 March 2014

Columbus, Ohio (Greater Columbus Convention Center, Arnold EXPO Stage)

#	Athlete	Nation	Points	Prize
1st place, gold medalist(s)	Žydrūnas Savickas	Lithuania	44.5	$65,000
2nd place, silver medalist(s)	Brian Shaw	United States	42.5	$20,000
3rd place, bronze medalist(s)	Mike Burke	United States	35	$15,000
4	Vytautas Lalas	Lithuania	32	$10,000
5	Hafþór Júlíus Björnsson	Iceland	26.5	$8,000
6	Jerry Pritchett	United States	25.5	$6,000
7	Mikhail Shivlyakov	Russia	23	$5,000
8	Robert Oberst	United States	20	$3,000
9	Dimitar Savatinov	Bulgaria	16.5	$2,000
10	Krzysztof Radzikowski	Poland	5.5	$1,000

=== 2015: Arnold Strongman Classic ===
Dates: 7, 8 March 2015

Columbus, Ohio (Greater Columbus Convention Center, Arnold EXPO Stage)

#	Athlete	Nation	Points	Prize
1st place, gold medalist(s)	Brian Shaw	United States	42.5	$70,000
2nd place, silver medalist(s)	Zydrunas Savickas	Lithuania	41.5	$20,000
3rd place, bronze medalist(s)	Mateusz Kieliszkowski	Poland	31	$15,000
4	Dimitar Savatinov	Bulgaria	30	$10,000
4	Mike Burke	United States	30	$8,000
6	Eddie Hall	United Kingdom	29	$6,000
7	Hafþór Júlíus Björnsson	Iceland	28	$5,000
8	Jerry Pritchett	United States	26	$3,000
9	Benedikt Magnusson	Iceland	5	$2,000
10	Warrick Brant	Australia	4	$1,000

=== 2016: Arnold Strongman Classic ===
Dates: 4, 5 March 2016

Columbus, Ohio (Greater Columbus Convention Center, Arnold EXPO Stage)

#	Athlete	Nation	Points	Prize
1st place, gold medalist(s)	Zydrunas Savickas	Lithuania	42	$72,000
2nd place, silver medalist(s)	Brian Shaw	United States	41	$22,000
3rd place, bronze medalist(s)	Vytautas Lalas	Lithuania	36	$17,000
4	Mateusz Kieliszkowski	Poland	33.5	$12,000
5	Hafþór Júlíus Björnsson	Iceland	32.5	$10,000
6	Jerry Pritchett	United States	24.5	$7,000
7	Mikhail Shivlyakov	Russia	22.5	$6,000
8	Dimitar Savatinov	Bulgaria	18.5	$4,000
9	Eddie Hall	United Kingdom	11	$3,000
10	Aleksandr Lysenko	Russia	10.5	$2,000

=== 2017: Arnold Strongman Classic ===
Dates: 3, 4 March 2017

Columbus, Ohio (Greater Columbus Convention Center, Arnold EXPO Stage)

#	Athlete	Nation	Points	Prize
1st place, gold medalist(s)	Brian Shaw	United States	47.5	$72,000
2nd place, silver medalist(s)	Hafþór Júlíus Björnsson	Iceland	41.5	$22,000
3rd place, bronze medalist(s)	Jerry Pritchett	United States	39.5	$17,000
4	Mateusz Kieliszkowski	Poland	31	$12,000
5	Mikhail Shivlyakov	Russia	29	$10,000
6	Vytautas Lalas	Lithuania	25	$7,000
7	Dimitar Savatinov	Bulgaria	22.5	$6,000
8	Martins Licis	United States	20.5	$4,000
9	Zach Hadge	United States	12.5	$3,000
10	Krzysztof Radzikowski	Poland	3	$2,000

=== 2018: Arnold Strongman Classic ===
Dates: 2, 3 March 2018

Columbus, Ohio (Greater Columbus Convention Center, Arnold EXPO Stage)

#	Athlete	Nation	Points	Prize
1st place, gold medalist(s)	Hafþór Júlíus Björnsson	Iceland	46	$72,000
2nd place, silver medalist(s)	Brian Shaw	United States	41.5	$22,000
3rd place, bronze medalist(s)	Mikhail Shivlyakov	Russia	30	$17,000
4	Mateusz Kieliszkowski	Poland	29	$12,000
5	Jean-François Caron	Canada	28	$10,000
6	Jerry Pritchett	United States	24	$6,500
6	Matjaz Belsak	Slovenia	24	$6,500
8	Rauno Heinla	Estonia	22.5	$4,000
9	Dimitar Savatinov	Bulgaria	18.5	$3,000
10	Mateusz Ostaszewski	Poland	11.5	$2,000

=== 2019: Arnold Strongman Classic ===
Dates: 1, 2 March 2019

Columbus, Ohio (Greater Columbus Convention Center, Arnold EXPO Stage)

#	Athlete	Nation	Points	Prize
1st place, gold medalist(s)	Hafþór Júlíus Björnsson	Iceland	45	$72,000
2nd place, silver medalist(s)	Martins Licis	United States	40.5	$22,000
3rd place, bronze medalist(s)	Mateusz Kieliszkowski	Poland	31.5	$17,000
4	Mikhail Shivlyakov	Russia	30.5	$12,000
5	Matjaz Belsak	Slovenia	28	$10,000
6	Rauno Heinla	Estonia	27	$7,000
7	Oleksii Novikov	Ukraine	25	$6,000
8	Brian Shaw	United States	21	$4,000
9	Jerry Pritchett	United States	14.5	$3,000
10	JF Caron	Canada	1	$2,000

=== 2020: Arnold Strongman Classic ===
Dates: 6, 7 March 2020

Columbus, Ohio (Greater Columbus Convention Center, Strongman Arena)

#	Athlete	Nation	Points	Prize
1st place, gold medalist(s)	Hafþór Júlíus Björnsson	Iceland	52.5	$72,000
2nd place, silver medalist(s)	Mateusz Kieliszkowski	Poland	50.5	$22,000
3rd place, bronze medalist(s)	Martins Licis	United States	36.5	$17,000
4	JF Caron	Canada	33	$12,000
5	Oleksii Novikov	Ukraine	31	$10,000
6	Mikhail Shivlyakov	Russia	29	$7,000
7	Rob Kearney	United States	29	$6,000
8	Jerry Pritchett	United States	27	$4,000
9	Bobby Thompson	United States	24	$3,000
10	Matjaz Belsak	Slovenia	17.5	$2,000

=== 2022: Arnold Strongman Classic ===
Dates: 4, 5 March 2022

Columbus, Ohio (Greater Columbus Convention Center, Strongman Arena)

#	Athlete	Nation	Points	Prize
1st place, gold medalist(s)	Martins Licis	United States	41	$80,000
2nd place, silver medalist(s)	Oleksii Novikov	Ukraine	37.5	$25,000 (+$55,000)
3rd place, bronze medalist(s)	Luke Stoltman	United Kingdom	30.5	$20,000
3rd place, bronze medalist(s)	Bobby Thompson	United States	30.5	$20,000
5	Rob Kearney	United States	28.5	$13,000
6	Maxime Boudreault	Canada	27	$8,000
7	Tom Stoltman	United Kingdom	21.5	$7,000
7	Trey Mitchell	United States	21.5	$7,000
9	Evgeny Markov	Russia	21	$5,000
10	JF Caron	Canada	14	$3,000

=== 2023: Arnold Strongman Classic ===
Dates: 3, 4 March 2023

Columbus, Ohio (Greater Columbus Convention Center, Strongman Arena)

#	Athlete	Nation	Points	Prize
1st place, gold medalist(s)	Mitchell Hooper	Canada	41.5	$80,000
2nd place, silver medalist(s)	Mateusz Kieliszkowski	Poland	37.5	$25,000
3rd place, bronze medalist(s)	Bobby Thompson	United States	29.5	$20,000
4	Trey Mitchell	United States	29	$15,000
5	Thomas Evans	United States	25.5	$13,000
6	Tom Stoltman	United Kingdom	24.5	$8,000
6	Pavlo Nakonechnyy	Ukraine	24.5	$8,000
8	Rob Kearney	United States	21	$6,000
9	Kevin Faires	United States	20	$5,000
9	Luke Stoltman	United Kingdom	20	$5,000

=== 2024: Arnold Strongman Classic ===
Dates: 1, 2 March 2024

Columbus, Ohio (Greater Columbus Convention Center, Strongman Arena)

#	Athlete	Nation	Points	Prize
1st place, gold medalist(s)	Mitchell Hooper	Canada	52	$80,000
2nd place, silver medalist(s)	Mateusz Kieliszkowski	Poland	40.5	$25,000
3rd place, bronze medalist(s)	Tom Stoltman	United Kingdom	38.5	$20,000
4	Hafþór Júlíus Björnsson	Iceland	38	$15,000
5	Bobby Thompson	United States	32	$13,000
6	Oleksii Novikov	Ukraine	25	$8,000
7	Evan Singleton	United States	24	$7,000
8	Martins Licis	United States	23	$6,000
9	Thomas Evans	United States	10	$5,000
10	Oskar Ziółkowski	Poland	8	$3,000
11	Maxime Boudreault	Canada	0	$2,000

=== 2025: Arnold Strongman Classic ===
Dates: 28 February - 1 March 2025

Columbus, Ohio (Greater Columbus Convention Center, Strongman Arena)

#	Athlete	Nation	Points	Prize
1st place, gold medalist(s)	Mitchell Hooper	Canada	52	$80,000
2nd place, silver medalist(s)	Lucas Hatton	United States	49	$25,000
3rd place, bronze medalist(s)	Hafþór Júlíus Björnsson	Iceland	42.5	$20,000
4	Austin Andrade	United States	38.5	$15,000
5	Trey Mitchell	United States	37.5	$13,000
6	Evan Singleton	United States	33	$8,000
7	Tom Stoltman	United Kingdom	31.5	$7,000
8	Bobby Thompson	United States	17.5	$6,000
9	Nick Guardione	United States	17	$5,000
10	Maxime Boudreault	Canada	6	$3,000

=== 2026: Arnold Strongman Classic ===
Dates: 6 March, 7 March 2025

Columbus, Ohio (Greater Columbus Convention Center, Strongman Arena)

#	Athlete	Nation	Points	Prize
1st place, gold medalist(s)	Mitchell Hooper	Canada	36	$80,000
2nd place, silver medalist(s)	Austin Andrade	United States	35	$25,000
3rd place, bronze medalist(s)	Martins Licis	United States	34	$20,000
4	Trey Mitchell	United States	31.5	$15,000
5	Lucas Hatton	United States	31	$13,000
6	Bryce Johnson	United States	27.5	$8,000
7	Thomas Evans	United States	27	$6,500
7	Nick Guardione	United States	27	$6,500
9	Andrew Burton	United States	14	$5,000

== Arnold Strongman Classic-Europe ==
Arnold Strongman Classic-Europe
- 2012
- The official logo of the Arnold Sports Festival

Tournament information
- Location: varies, 2012 contest held in Madrid, Spain
- Month played: October
- Established: 2012
- Format: Multi-event competition
- Purse: $10,000

Current champion
- (Poland) Mateusz Kieliszkowski

In 2012, the inaugural "Arnold Strongman Classic-Europe" contest was formed and is a joint promotion between Arnold Schwarzenegger, Jim Lorimer (Arnold Sports Festival co-promoter), Dr. Rafael Santonja (president of the International Federation of Body Building, "IFBB") as well as American Strongman Corporation and Strongman Champions League.

The "Arnold Strongman Classic-Europe" contest will differ significantly from the format of the original Arnold Strongman Classic event, with less of an emphasis on brute strength and heavy events, and will include a wider variety of events and some speed/loading events similar to Strongman Champions League and World's Strongest Man contests. The format change is due largely in part to the event being broadcast and televised in 85 countries.

=== 2012: Arnold Strongman Classic-Europe ===
The 2012 contest was held in Madrid, Spain on Oct. 13 & 14, 2012, the event was sponsored by Maximum Human Performance. The contest is included as part of the 2012 Strongman Champions League season, and competitors earned points towards the annual SCL overall title. The inaugural contest was won by 6-time Arnold Strongman champion and reigning World's Strongest Man Zydrunas Savickas of Lithuania, who was also the 2012 SCL overall champion.

Dates: October 13–14, 2012

Madrid, Spain

Position	Name	Country	Points
(gold) .	Zydrunas Savickas	LTU	47
(silver) .	Krzysztof Radzikowski	POL	44
(bronze) .	Vytautas Lalas	LTU	42.5
4.	Mike Burke	USA	37.5
5.	Mikhail Koklyaev	RUS	37
6.	Hafþór Júlíus Björnsson	ISL	36.5
7.	Mike Jenkins	USA	35
8.	Ervin Katona	SER	22
9.	Konstiantyn Ilin	UKR	16
10.	Lauri Nami	EST	14

=== 2016: Arnold Strongman Classic-Europe ===
Date: September 24, 2016

Barcelona, Spain

Position	Name	Country	Points
(gold) .	Brian Shaw	USA	43
(silver) .	Mateusz Kieliszkowski	POL	35
(bronze) .	Krzysztof Radzikowski	POL	34
4.	Matjaz Belsak	SLO	34
5.	Mikhail Shivlyakov	RUS	34
6.	Rauno Heinla	EST	28
7.	Jerry Pritchett	USA	23
8.	Justin Fisher	USA	14.5
9.	Sigfus Fossdal	ISL	13.5
10.	Terry Hollands	GBR	0

=== 2017: Arnold Strongman Classic-Europe ===
Date: September 23, 2017

Barcelona, Spain

Position	Name	Country	Points
(gold) .	Matjaz Belsak	SLO	53
(silver) .	Krzysztof Radzikowski	POL	49
(bronze) .	Jerry Pritchett	USA	48
4.	Dimitar Savatinov	BUL	41
5.	Konstantine Janashia	GEO	40
6.	Dainis Zageris	LAT	33.5
7.	Justin Fisher	USA	32.5
8.	Jitse Kramer	NED	25
9.	Sigfus Fossdal	ISL	25
10.	Chris Alitz	USA	11
11.	Jiri Vytiska	CZE	8

=== 2018: Arnold Strongman Classic-Europe ===
Dates: March 16–17, 2018

Barcelona, Spain

Position	Name	Country	Points
(gold) .	Martins Licis	USA	59.5
(silver) .	Matjaz Belsak	SLO	55
(bronze) .	Krzysztof Radzikowski	POL	50
4.	Dimitar Savatinov	BUL	49.5
5.	Jean-François Caron	CAN	45.5
6.	Jerry Pritchett	USA	41.5
7.	Jimmy Paquet	CAN	39.5
8.	Robert Cyrwus	POL	35.5
9.	Andrew Clayton	USA	25
10.	Jitse Kramer	NED	24.5
11.	Rauno Heinla	EST	24
12.	Sigfus Fossdal	ISL	22.5
13.	Karl Hjelholt	CAN	18
14.	Mateusz Ostaszewski	POL	2

=== 2019: Arnold Strongman Classic-Europe ===
Date: September 21, 2019

Barcelona, Spain

Position	Name	Country	Points
(gold) .	Mateusz Kieliszkowski	POL	80.5
(silver) .	Oleksii Novikov	UKR	78
(bronze) .	Jean-François Caron	CAN	71
4.	Mikhail Shivlyakov	RUS	64
5.	Jerry Pritchett	USA	57
6.	Jimmy Paquet	USA	55.5
7.	Brian Shaw	USA	51
8.	Aivars Smaukstelis	LAT	49
9.	Matjaz Belsak	SLO	47.5
10.	Rauno Heinla	EST	46
11.	Maxime Boudreault	CAN	43.5
12.	Aaron Page	GBR	41
13.	Jitse Kramer	NED	38.5
14.	Nedzmin Ambeskovic	BIH	35.5
15.	Kim Gerhardt	SWE	32.5
16.	Brad Neitzel	USA	20.5
17.	Luke Reynolds	AUS	14

== Arnold Strongman Classic Australia ==
Arnold Strongman Classic Australia
- 2015
- The official logo of the Arnold Sports Festival

Tournament information
- Location: varies, 2015 contest held in Melbourne Convention and Exhibition Centre
- Month played: October
- Established: 2015
- Format: Multi-event competition
- Purse: $10,000

Current champion
- Rob Kearney

In 2015, the inaugural "Arnold Strongman Classic Australia" contest was formed, and is a joint promotion between Arnold Schwarzenegger, Jim Lorimer (Arnold Sports Festival co-promoter), Dr. Rafael Santonja (president of the International Federation of BodyBuilding & Fitness, "IFBB") as well as Australian Strongman Corporation and Strongman Champions League.

=== 2015: Arnold Strongman Classic Australia ===
Dates: March 13–14, 2015

Melbourne, Australia

Position	Name	Country	Points
(gold) .	Brian Shaw	USA	54.5
(silver) .	Krzysztof Radzikowski	POL	41.5
(bronze) .	Robert Oberst	USA	43
4.	Eddie Hall	GBR	40
5.	Eben Le Roux	AUS	32
6.	Gerhard Van Staden	SA	28.5
7.	Rob Frampton	GBR	25.5
8.	Danny Macri	AUS	16.5
9.	Ben Simpson	AUS	15
10.	Tristen O’Brien	SA	10.5

=== 2016: Arnold Strongman Classic Australia ===
Dates: March 18–19, 2016

Melbourne, Australia

Position	Name	Country	Points
(gold) .	Hafþór Júlíus Björnsson	ISL	44.5
(silver) .	Krzysztof Radzikowski	POL	34
(bronze) .	Zydrunas Savickas	LTU	33
4.	Eben Le Roux	AUS	24.5
5.	Colm Woulfe	NZL	18
6.	Luke Reynolds	AUS	13
7.	Rob Frampton	UK	11
8.	Dimitar Savatinov	BUL	0

=== 2017: Arnold Strongman Classic Australia ===
Date: March 18, 2017

Melbourne, Australia

Position	Name	Country	Points
(gold) .	Brian Shaw	USA	38
(silver) .	Mikhail Shivlyakov	RUS	33
(bronze) .	Jean-François Caron	CAN	32.5
4.	Rauno Heinla	EST	29.5
5.	Mateusz Kieliszkowski	POL	24.5
6.	Colm Woulfe	NZL	22
7.	Mathew Ragg	NZL	18
8.	Adam Derks	USA	13.5

=== 2018: Arnold Strongman Classic Australia ===
Dates: March 16–17, 2018

Melbourne, Australia

Position	Name	Country	Points
(gold) .	Rauno Heinla	EST	56
(silver) .	Jean-François Caron	CAN	46
(bronze) .	Martins Licis	USA	45.5
4.	Matjaz Belsak	SLO	44
5.	Trey Mitchell	USA	43.5
6.	Dimitar Savatinov	BUL	43
7.	Rongo Keene	AUS	33.5
8.	Mathew Ragg	NZL	23
9.	Eddie Williams	AUS	19.5
10.	Jean Stephen Coraboeuf	AUS	12.5
11.	Terry Hollands	GBR	8.5

=== 2019: Arnold Strongman Classic Australia ===
Dates: March 15–16, 2019

Melbourne, Australia

Position	Name	Country	Points
(gold) .	Rob Kearney	USA	57
(silver) .	Matjaz Belsak	SLO	55
(bronze) .	Rauno Heinla	EST	52
4.	Mikhail Shivlyakov	RUS	50.5
5.	Eddie Williams	AUS	46.5
6.	Jerry Pritchett	USA	42.5
7.	Jimmy Paquet	CAN	37
8.	Dylan Lockard	USA	34.5
9.	Jitse Kramer	NED	31.5
10.	Rongo Keene	AUS	28.5
11.	Jean Stephen Coraboeuf	AUS	17.5

== Arnold Strongman Classic USA ==
Arnold Strongman Classic USA
- 2022
- The official logo of the Arnold Sports Festival

Tournament information
- Location: Santa Monica
- Month played: January
- Established: 2019
- Format: Multi-event competition
- Purse: $10,000

Current champion
- Martins Licis

In 2019, the inaugural "Arnold Strongman Classic USA" contest was established. A competition that's part of the Arnold Pro Strongman World Series ran by Arnold Schwarzenegger. It was held on the Santa Monica Pier.

=== 2019: Arnold Strongman Classic USA ===
Dates: January 19, 2019

Santa Monica, California

Position	Name	Country	Points
(gold) .	Martins Licis	USA	38.5
(silver) .	Mateusz Kieliszkowski	POL	38
(bronze) .	Rauno Heinla	EST	33
4.	Matjaz Belsak	SLO	27.5
5.	Jitse Kramer	NED	17
6.	Jerry Pritchett	USA	16.5
7.	Brian Clark	USA	8.5
8.	JF Caron	CAN	6
9.	Mateusz Ostaszewski	POL	4

=== 2020: Arnold Strongman Classic USA ===
Dates: January 18, 2020

Santa Monica, California

Position	Name	Country	Points
(gold) .	Martins Licis	USA	52
(silver) .	Brian Shaw	USA	51
(bronze) .	Maxime Boudreault	CAN	50.5
4.	Rauno Heinla	EST	48.5
5.	JF Caron	CAN	45.5
6.	Jerry Pritchett	USA	41
7.	Jitse Kramer	NED	31.5
8.	Rob Kearney	USA	31
9.	Wesley Clayborn	USA	30.5
10.	Casey Garrison	USA	22
11.	Oleksii Novikov	UKR	20
12.	Eddie Williams	AUS	12
13.	Matjaz Belsak	SLO	9

== Arnold Strongman Classic UK ==
Arnold Strongman Classic UK
- 2022
- The official logo of the Arnold Sports Festival

Tournament information
- Location: National Exhibition Centre, Birmingham
- Month played: September/March
- Established: 2022
- Format: Multi-event competition
- Purse: $30,000

Current champion
- Mitchell Hooper

In 2022, the inaugural "Arnold Strongman Classic UK" contest was established being a joint promotion between Arnold Schwarzenegger and Eddie Hall. One year earlier the 2021 Arnold Strongman UK was organised by Giants Live.

=== 2022: Arnold Strongman Classic UK ===
Dates: September 23–24, 2022

Birmingham, United Kingdom

Position	Name	Country	Points
(gold) .	Mitchell Hooper	CAN	79.5
(silver) .	Oleksii Novikov	UKR	71
(bronze) .	Rauno Heinla	EST	61.5
4.	Pá O'Dwyer	IRE	55
5.	Gavin Bilton	GBR	47
6.	Paul Smith	GBR	44.5
7.	Konstantine Janashia	GEO	43
8.	Kim Lorentzen	GRL	37
9.	Ryan Bennett	GBR	36.5
10.	Louis Jack	GBR	33.5
11.	Žydrūnas Savickas	LIT	33.5
12.	Ervin Toots	EST	31.5
13.	Ben Williams	GBR	27
14.	Zake Muluzi	GBR	23.5

=== 2024: Arnold Strongman Classic UK ===
Dates: March 16–17, 2024

Birmingham, United Kingdom

Position	Name	Country	Points
(gold) .	Mitchell Hooper	CAN	34.5
(silver) .	Hafþór Júlíus Björnsson	ISL	32.5
(bronze) .	Lucas Hatton	USA	24
4.	Bobby Thompson	USA	23.5
5.	Maxime Boudreault	CAN	19
6.	Oskar Ziółkowski	POL	16
7.	Gavin Bilton	GBR	12. 5
8.	Rauno Heinla	EST	11

== Arnold Amateur Strongman World Championships ==
In 2010, the Arnold Amateur contest was formed by Dione Wessels. The contest is open to amateur strongman competitors from all over the world. The winner of the contest receives their pro card, and an invite to the next year's Arnold Strongman Classic event. Mike Jenkins won the inaugural contest in 2010,Mateusz Baron from Poland was the 2011 winner, and Adam Scherr was the 2012 winner.

=== 2010: Arnold Amateur Strongman World Championships ===
Dates: 7, 6 March 2010

Columbus, Ohio (Greater Columbus Convention Center, Arnold EXPO Stage)

Position	Name	Country	Points
1.	Mike Jenkins	USA	58.14
2.	Mike Caruso	USA	56.10
3.	Alan Kleise	AUS	52.75
4.	Artis Plivda	LAT	50.85
5.	Ryan Bracewell	USA	49.14
6.	Johnathan Hughes	GBR	48.26
7.	Brad Ardrey	USA	47.61
8.	Dainis Zageris	LAT	47.18
9.	Scott Cummine	CAN	44.32
10.	Paul Vaillancourt	CAN	36.22

=== 2011: Arnold Amateur Strongman World Championships ===
Dates: 5, 6 March 2011

Columbus, Ohio (Greater Columbus Convention Center, Arnold EXPO Stage)

Position	Name	Country	Points
1.	Mateusz Baron	POL	66.4
2.	Hafþór Júlíus Björnsson	ISL	56.9
3.	Mike Burke	USA	52
4.	Jacob Bodi	USA	51.8
5.	Tomas Rodriguez	USA	44
6.	Mikhail Shivlyakov	RUS	43.9
7.	Brad Ardrey	USA	43.7
8.	Paul Vaillancourt	CAN	42.8
9.	Oleksandr Lashyn	UKR	38.6
10.	Derek Devaughan	USA	32.2

=== 2012: Arnold Amateur Strongman World Championships ===
Dates: 3, 4 March 2012

Columbus, Ohio (Greater Columbus Convention Center, Arnold EXPO Stage)

Position	Name	Country	Points
1.	Adam Scherr	USA	64.2
2.	Mikhail Shivlyakov	RUS	54.7
3.	Tomas Rodriguez	USA	47.5
4.	Steve Schmidt	USA	46.0
5.	Jacob Bodi	USA	41.3
6.	Bartłomiej Bąk	POL	39.8
7.	Kenneth Nowicki	GBR	38.8
8.	Luke Skaarup	CAN	38.6
9.	Chad Kurian	USA	37.9
10.	Lauri Nami	EST	36.8

=== 2013: Arnold Amateur Strongman World Championships ===
Dates: 1,2 March 2013

Columbus, Ohio (Greater Columbus Convention Center, Arnold EXPO Stage)

Position	Name	Country	Points
1.	Mikhail Shivlyakov	RUS	59.9
2.	Jacob Bodi	USA	54.11
3.	Bartlomiej Bak	POL	53.48
4.	Lou Costa	USA	51.62
5.	Mateusz Ostaszewski	POL	49.33
6.	Tommy Miller	USA	47.45
7.	John Posen	USA	44.65
8.	Tomasz Ladermann	POL	42.66
9.	Dimitar Savatinov	BUL	41.11
10.	Brett Somerville	USA	37.33

=== 2014: Arnold Amateur Strongman World Championships ===
Dates: 1,2 March 2014

Columbus, Ohio (Greater Columbus Convention Center, Arnold EXPO Stage)

Position	Name	Country	Points
1.	Mateusz Kieliszkowski	POL	62.68
2.	Andrew Clayton	USA	56.35
3.	Ben Ruckstuhl	CAN	52.12
4.	Nicholas Lepperd	USA	49.35
5.	Alan Colley	USA	48.76
6.	Casey Garrison	USA	48.18
7.	John Posen	USA	44.76
8.	Michal Kopacki	POL	37.71
9.	Matt Mills	USA	36.97
10.	Tommy Miller	USA	36.24

=== 2015: Arnold Amateur Strongman World Championships ===
Dates: 7,8 March 2015

Columbus, Ohio (Greater Columbus Convention Center, Arnold EXPO Stage)

Position	Name	Country	Points
1.	Aleksandr Lysenko	RUS	50.85
2.	Bryan Benzel	USA	50.35
3.	Konstantine Janashia	GEO	48.69
4.	Rob Kearney	USA	44.53
5.	Luke Herrick	USA	39.23
6.	Evgeny Markov	RUS	39.12
7.	Markus Mannik	EST	38.77
8.	Michal Kopacki	POL	38.58
9.	Johan Espenkrona	SWE	36.45
10.	Vladimir Kalivichenko	RUS	33.35

=== 2016: Arnold Amateur Strongman World Championships ===
Dates: 4, 5 March 2016

Columbus, Ohio (Greater Columbus Convention Center, Arnold EXPO Stage)

Position	Name	Country	Points
1.	Zach Hadge	USA	45.63
2.	Evgeny Markov	RUS	43.00
3.	Mathew Ragg	NZ	42.50
4.	Mateusz Ostaszewski	POL	39.50
5.	Gabriel Peña	USA	39.50
6.	Steve Schmidt	USA	35.38
7.	Meelis Peil	EST	33.38
8.	Brian Fletcher	USA	33.13
9.	Jakub Szczechowski	POL	32.75
10.	Charles Mitchell	USA	32.75

=== 2017: Arnold Amateur Strongman World Championships ===
Dates: 1,2 March 2017

Columbus, Ohio (Greater Columbus Convention Center, Arnold EXPO Stage)

Position	Name	Country	Points
1.	Mateusz Ostaszewski	POL	51.85
2.	Oleksii Novikov	UKR	50.02
3.	Ramin Farajnezhad	IRN	45.56
4.	Jacob Fincher	USA	45.18
5.	Kenneth McClelland	USA	44.04
6.	Evgeny Markov	RUS	40.02
7.	Brian Fletcher	USA	38.71
8.	Josh Reynolds	USA	37.17
9.	Michael Schultze	USA	35.63
10.	Chad Kurian	USA	33.39

=== 2018: Arnold Amateur Strongman World Championships ===
Dates: 2, 3 March 2018

Columbus, Ohio (Greater Columbus Convention Center, Arnold EXPO Stage)

Position	Name	Country	Points
1.	Oleksii Novikov	UKR	54.4
2.	Evgeny Markov	RUS	52.2
3.	Josh Reynolds	USA	51.6
4.	Marcus Crowder	USA	46.2
5.	Brian Fletcher	USA	42.4
6.	Casey Shoe	USA	41.6
7.	Dylan Lockard	USA	39.2
8.	Anthony Fuhrman	USA	33.9
9.	Ryan Imbach	USA	32.7
10.	Mariusz Dorawa	POL	32.6

=== 2019: Arnold Amateur Strongman World Championships ===
Dates: 2, 3 March 2019

Columbus, Ohio (Greater Columbus Convention Center, Arnold EXPO Stage)

Position	Name	Country	Points
1.	Bobby Thompson	USA	54.38
2.	Marcus Crowder	USA	52.13
3.	Nathan Goltry	USA	48.50
4.	Konrad Karwat	POL	43.75
5.	Marcin Sendwicki	POL	43.63
6.	Alexander Kopp	USA	42.00
7.	Jose Baez	USA	39.13
8.	Oleksandr Kocherin	UKR	38.38
9.	Pavlo Kordiyaka	UKR	35.38
10.	Anthony Fuhrman	USA	33.63

=== 2020: Arnold Amateur Strongman World Championships ===
Dates: 7, 8 March 2020

Columbus, Ohio (Greater Columbus Convention Center, Arnold EXPO Stage)

Position	Name	Country	Points
1.	Evgeny Markov	RUS	51.91
2.	Dmitrii Skosyrskii	RUS	48.53
3.	Gabriel Peña	USA	47.78
4.	Jose Baez	USA	47.03
5.	Konrad Karwat	POL	40.44
6.	Tyler Cotton	USA	38.44
7.	Stanley Cocker	NZL	36.59
8.	Cody Seminuk	CAN	36.38
9.	Alexander Kopp	USA	36.06
10.	Frederick Rheaume	CAN	32.56

=== 2022: Arnold Amateur Strongman World Championships ===
Dates: 4, 6 March 2022

Columbus, Ohio (Greater Columbus Convention Center, Arnold EXPO Stage)

Position	Name	Country	Points
1.	Thomas Evans	USA	52.87
2.	Jack Plankers	USA	50.72
3.	Alexander Kopp	USA	49.94
4.	Stephen Good	USA	44.39
5.	Eric Carlson	USA	41.09
6.	Alex Kelley	USA	39.18
7.	James Jeffers	CAN	36.64
8.	Dawid Pakulski	POL	33.72
9.	Thomas Sroka	USA	33.45
10.	Clayton Desilva	USA	33.00

=== 2023: Arnold Amateur Strongman World Championships ===
Dates: 3, 5 March 2023

Columbus, Ohio (Greater Columbus Convention Center, Arnold EXPO Stage)

Position	Name	Country	Points
1.	Oskar Ziółkowski	POL	56.58
2.	Lucas Hatton	USA	56.42
3.	Justin Legere	USA	52.39
4.	Joseph Payne	USA	46.08
5.	James Jeffers	CAN	44.15
6.	Joe Mass	USA	43.54
7.	Shawn Schellenger	USA	41.70
8.	Nicolas Cambi	USA	41.62
9.	Stephen Good	USA	34.66
10.	Zach Harding	USA	33.66

=== 2024 Arnold Amateur Strongman World Championship ===
Dates: 2, 3 March 2024

Columbus, Ohio (Greater Columbus Convention Center, Arnold EXPO Stage)

Position	Name	Country	Points
1.	Nick Guardione	USA	37.60
2.	Andrew Burton	USA	32.14
3.	Josh Spurgeon	USA	31.76
4.	Joe Mass	USA	31.69
5.	Brian Kichton	USA	29.94
6.	Seth Soukup	USA	29.30
7.	Nathan Warfel	USA	24.51
8.	Matyas Funiok	CZE	22.61
9.	Shawn Schellenger	USA	20.46
10.	Denis Berezhnyk	UKR	19.41

=== 2025 Arnold Strongman Pro/Am ===
Dates: 1, 2 March 2025

Columbus, Ohio (Greater Columbus Convention Center, Arnold EXPO Stage)

Position	Name	Country	Points
1.	Andrew Burton	USA	31
2.	Seth Soukup	USA	25.5
3.	Tyler Thompson	USA	23.5
4.	Jack Osborn	GBR	22.5
5.	Zack Price	USA	22.5
6.	Anthony Balzano	USA	20.5
7.	Marc Sanchez	USA	18.5
8.	Raul Flores	MEX	16

=== 2026 Arnold Strongman Pro/Am ===
Dates: 7, 8 March 2026

Columbus, Ohio (Greater Columbus Convention Center, Rogue Stage and Arnold EXPO Stage)

Position	Name	Country	Points
1.	Roy Orrantia	USA	43
2.	Adam Roszkowski	POL	37.5
3.	Austin Hamm	USA	37
4.	Dawid Pakulski	POL	33.5
5.	Beau Bathery	USA	29.5
6.	Ajuna Rwakatare	USA	26.5
7.	Zach Hardin	USA	22
8.	BJ Stone	AUS	21
