= Ukrainian Federation of Strength Athletes =

Federation of strength athletes in Ukraine

The Ukrainian Federation of Strength Athletes (UFSA) (Ukrainian: Федерація найсильніших атлетів України і перетягування канату) is a federation of strength athletes in Ukraine. It was created in 2001 and is a member of the International Federation of Strength Athletes (IFSA) which includes 54 national federations.
